= Reggie Harding =

American basketball player (1942–1972)

- Harding with the Chicago Bulls in 1967

Personal information
- Born: May 4, 1942 Detroit, Michigan, U.S.
- Died: September 2, 1972 (aged 30) Detroit, Michigan, U.S.
- Listed height: 7 ft 0 in (2.13 m)
- Listed weight: 249 lb (113 kg)

Career information
- High school: Eastern (Detroit, Michigan); Nashville Christian (Nashville, Tennessee)
- NBA draft: 1963: 6th round, 48th overall pick
- Drafted by: Detroit Pistons
- Playing career: 1962–1968
- Position: Center
- Number: 19; 17; 32

Career history
- 1962: Toledo Tartans
- 1962–1963: Holland Oilers
- 1964–1967: Detroit Pistons
- 1967: Chicago Bulls
- 1967: Trenton Colonials
- 1968: Indiana Pacers

Career highlights
- First-team Parade All-American (1961)

Career NBA and ABA statistics
- Points: 2,175 (9.5 ppg)
- Rebounds: 2,199 (9.6 rpg)
- Assists: 396 (1.7 apg)
- Stats at NBA.com
- Stats at Basketball Reference

Reginald Hezeriah Harding (May 4, 1942 – September 2, 1972) was an American professional basketball player. He starred while playing at Eastern High School in his hometown of Detroit, Michigan, and entered the 1962 NBA draft without playing college basketball due to eligibility issues. Harding was selected by the Detroit Pistons as the first player drafted into the National Basketball Association (NBA) without having played in college.

Harding played his first professional season in the Midwest Professional Basketball League (MPBL) before he joined the Pistons in 1964. He spent parts of four seasons in the NBA with the Pistons and the Chicago Bulls during which he was the subject of team misconduct, criminal activity and a season-long league suspension. After his NBA career ended, Harding played briefly in the Continental Basketball Association (CBA) for the Trenton Colonials and the American Basketball Association (ABA) for the Indiana Pacers.

Harding's career came to a premature end when he was imprisoned from 1969 to 1971 for a concealed weapons charge. He attempted to pursue a professional comeback after his release but he was murdered in Detroit in 1972.

== Early life ==
Harding was born to 17-year-old Lillie Mae Thomas on May 4, 1942. Thomas' parents forced her to put her baby up for adoption and he was adopted by local couple Hezekiah and Fannie Harding, who were friends of the Thomas family and looked after unwanted children. Thomas would maintain a connection with her son; she followed Harding during his high school career and developed a relationship with him during his adult life. Thomas told relatives that Harding's father was a married man living in Detroit but never disclosed his identity.

Harding harbored aspirations of becoming a basketball player by the time he was 10 but was too shy to play with the children at his school. He was mentored by neighbor Bill Ervin, who introduced him to the players of a local court where Harding would hone his skills.

== High school career ==
Harding attended Eastern High School in his hometown of Detroit, Michigan. He led Eastern to three straight city championships from 1959 to 1961. Standing 7 ft 0 in (2.13 m), Harding was considered to be the first player of his size in Michigan high school basketball and was highly regarded for his rebounding abilities. By his junior season, Harding was considered the "greatest high school player ever produced in Detroit's Public School League" but he was already experiencing grade issues that would have excluded him from college. When his playing eligibility finished in March 1961, Harding was not expected to graduate until January 1962. He estimated that he had received "135 college offers" but wanted to play for the Niagara Purple Eagles.

After leaving Eastern, Harding attended the Nashville Christian Institute, a college-preparatory school in Nashville, Tennessee, and played basketball there until it was found out that his high school eligibility had expired. Harding's grades were too low to enter college.

== Professional career ==
Harding was selected by his hometown Detroit Pistons in the 1962 NBA draft as the 29th overall pick and became the first NBA player to be drafted without playing in college. The legality of the selection was challenged immediately as the NBA rules stated a player could be drafted if they did not plan to enter college but needed to have been out of school for a full year. Harding's prep school stint in Tennessee brought this into question and he was ultimately unable to sign with the team due to the technicality in his eligibility. Pistons Director of Staff Fran Smith knew of the issue but stated that the team utilized the advantage of draft protection as several other teams had shown an interest in signing Harding. In July 1962, National Basketball Association Board of Governors ruled that the Pistons could retain his player rights but he could not be signed until the 1963–64 NBA season. Harding instead began his professional career in the Midwest Professional Basketball League (MPBL) with the Toledo Tartans and Cook's/Holland Oilers during the 1962–63 season. He was selected by the Detroit Pistons again in the 1963 NBA draft as the 48th overall pick. Harding was signed by the Pistons, but was kept off the roster for disciplinary reasons as he was involved in a police investigation. In 1963, Harding was assigned by the Pistons to a five-day clinic with Dr. W. M. Hardy, a chiropractor in Waynesville, North Carolina, who served as an advisor to the Pistons, and was taught how to shoot a basketball. Harding began the clinic with only the use of a right-handed hook shot but left with the ability to "shoot every shot in the book".

On January 18, 1964, the NBA authorized the Pistons to allow Harding, who had been touring with the exhibitional Harlem Road Kings, to join their roster. He became the Pistons' starting center four games into his NBA career and stayed in that position for the rest of the season. He averaged 11 points per game and played so well that Boston Celtics head coach Red Auerbach remarked about Harding before the 1964 NBA draft: "Say what they want to about all the fine, big fellows coming out of college in 1964, but the Pistons already have a guy who probably will outshine them all." Harding had high expectations entering the 1964–65 NBA season and he was considered to potentially "be a match for the NBA's top pivotmen".

During his stint with the Pistons, Harding was notorious for his casual attitude and misbehavior. He slept through practice sessions and missed a flight for a game against the Baltimore Bullets. In August 1965, Harding was charged with assault and battery against a Detroit policeman while contesting a parking ticket. Harding was suspended indefinitely by the NBA for "conduct detrimental to professional basketball" in September 1965. He was found guilty of the assault and battery charge in October 1965 and fined $2,000 by the Pistons, which was the highest fine in professional basketball history at the time. Harding ultimately missed the entirety of the 1965–66 NBA season.

Harding's suspension was lifted by the NBA in September 1966, who were aware that Harding threatened to sue if he was not allowed to return. Harding signed a one-year contract with the Pistons that totalled $15,000, where his return was heralded as being that of the "world's tallest reformed delinquent". Pistons player-coach Dave DeBusschere was elated to have Harding return and considered him "at least the fifth best center" in professional basketball when he last played – after Wilt Chamberlain, Bill Russell, Walt Bellamy and Nate Thurmond.

Harding was traded to the Chicago Bulls on October 2, 1967, for a third-round pick in the 1968 NBA draft. He was waived by the Bulls in December 1967 after he was suspended for overstaying a leave granted to him to attend his adoptive mother's funeral.

In January 1968, Harding signed with the Indiana Pacers of the American Basketball Association (ABA). He was regarded for his physical play and was once chased off the court during a game by Denver Nuggets player Byron Beck after he elbowed Beck in the mouth. Teammate Roger Brown said of Harding: "He was a clown but he had talent. He was really physical and mean ... but we couldn't keep him on the court". Pacers general manager Mike Storen asked Ollie Darden to serve as Harding's unofficial bodyguard; Darden fed Harding, lent him clothing and took him to games when he could be found. Harding was fined by the Pacers on multiple occasions for misconduct and was ultimately suspended throughout the playoffs after he stopped attending practice. Pacers player Jerry Harkness believed that the team had a "good chance" to be ABA champions if Harding was not suspended. Harding was waived by the Pacers at the end of the season.

== Personal issues and death ==
Harding's basketball career was cut short by a number of personal problems. Harding was arrested 11 times, often struggled with drug addictions, and was rumored to carry a pistol in his gym bag. As a high school student, Harding raped Florence Ballard, a member of The Supremes, at knifepoint outside a Detroit ballroom in 1960.

Harding developed a heroin addiction during his NBA suspension in 1966 that he overcame in 1969. DeBusschere remarked that Harding was often isolated from his teammates as they felt "extremely uneasy" around him. During a television interview, Harding threatened to shoot the Indiana Pacers' general manager, Mike Storen. Harding also reportedly threatened to shoot teammate Jimmy Rayl while the two were rooming together. In June 1968, Harding was a police prisoner at Detroit General Hospital for an investigation of armed robbery; he returned to the hospital the following week with gunshot wounds to both legs in a separate incident. In 1969, Harding was sentenced to 2 1/2 years in prison for a concealed weapons charge and served his sentence in Southern Michigan Prison. After his release in June 1971, he attempted to make an NBA comeback but never signed with a team.

Two weeks before Harding's death, his birth mother, Lillie Mae Thomas, was shot to death in an argument with her husband. At her funeral, Harding stood over her coffin for 15 minutes and instructed the funeral director on how he would want his own funeral.

On September 1, 1972, Harding was shot twice in the head by Carl Scott, who had been involved in an argument with Harding 20 minutes earlier. Harding was taken to Detroit General Hospital where he died at 1:30pm EST the following day. He was survived by his wife and two children. Scott had not been arrested as of October 1972.

Harding's son, Reginald Jr., was convicted of murder in 1988 and is serving life imprisonment without parole.

== Career statistics ==
Legend
GP	Games played	GS	Games started	MPG	Minutes per game
FG%	Field goal percentage	3P%	3-point field goal percentage	FT%	Free throw percentage
RPG	Rebounds per game	APG	Assists per game	SPG	Steals per game
BPG	Blocks per game	PPG	Points per game	**Bold**	Career high

=== NBA/ABA ===
==== Regular season ====
Year	Team	GP	GS	MPG	FG%	3P%	FT%	RPG	APG	SPG	BPG	PPG
1963–64	Detroit	39	–	29.7	.400	–	**.622**	10.5	1.3	–	–	11.0
1964–65	Detroit	**78**	–	**34.6**	.410	–	.612	11.6	**2.3**	–	–	12.0
1966–67	Detroit	74	–	18.5	**.449**	–	.612	6.1	1.3	–	–	5.5
1967–68	Chicago	14	–	21.8	.338	–	.515	6.7	1.3	–	–	4.6
1967–68	Indiana (ABA)	25	–	33.6	.452	.000	.578	**13.4**	2.1	–	–	**13.4**
Career		230	–	27.7	.419	.000	.602	9.6	1.7	–	–	9.5

== In popular culture ==
The character Raymond in the movie White Men Can't Jump, played by Marques Johnson, was based on Harding.

== See also ==
- List of homicides in Michigan
- NBA high school draftees
