= Grady McCollum =

American professional basketball player

Grady McCollum was a professional basketball player in the United States. He starred for Western Illinois University Leathernecks before playing professionally for the Cleveland Pipers and then for the Hawaii / Long Beach Chiefs. Pipers' manager George Steinbrenner reportedly traded him before halftime of a game to the Hawaii team. He also played for the Harlem Globetrotters and Chicago Bombers. He was inducted into the Western Illinois University Hall of Fame in 1984.
