= 1957–58 Michigan Wolverines men's basketball team =

American college basketball season

1957–58 Michigan Wolverines men's basketball
- Conference: Big Ten Conference
- Record: 11–11 (6–8 Big Ten)
- Head coach: William Perigo
- MVP: Pete Tillotson
- Captain: Pete Tillotson
- Home arena: Yost Field House

1957–58 Big Ten Conference men's basketball standings
| | Conf. | | | | Overall |
| Team | W | | L | PCT | W | | L | PCT |
|---|---|---|---|---|---|---|---|---|
| No. 12 Indiana | 10 | – | 4 | .714 | 13 | – | 11 | .542 |
| No. 17 Michigan State | 9 | – | 5 | .643 | 16 | – | 6 | .727 |
| Purdue | 9 | – | 5 | .643 | 14 | – | 8 | .636 |
| Northwestern | 8 | – | 6 | .571 | 13 | – | 9 | .591 |
| Ohio State | 8 | – | 6 | .571 | 9 | – | 13 | .409 |
| Iowa | 7 | – | 7 | .500 | 13 | – | 9 | .591 |
| Michigan | 6 | – | 8 | .429 | 11 | – | 11 | .500 |
| Illinois | 5 | – | 9 | .357 | 11 | – | 11 | .500 |
| Minnesota | 5 | – | 9 | .357 | 9 | – | 12 | .429 |
| Wisconsin | 3 | – | 11 | .214 | 8 | – | 14 | .364 |
Rankings from AP Poll

The 1957–58 Michigan Wolverines men's basketball team represented the University of Michigan in intercollegiate basketball during the 1957–58 season. The team finished the season in seventh place in the Big Ten Conference with an overall record of 11–11 and 6–8 against conference opponents.

William Perigo was in his sixth year as the team's head coach. Senior Pete Tillotson was the team's leading scorer with 415 points in 22 games for an average of 18.8 points per game. Tillotson also served as the team's captain and was selected as the Most Valuable Player.

== Statistical leaders ==
| Player | Pos. | Yr | G | FG | FT | RB | Pts | PPG |
| Pete Tillotson | | Sr. | 22 | 166-396 | 83-104 | | 415 | 18.8 |
| M. C. Burton, Jr. | | | 22 | 135-376 | 111-133 | | 381 | 17.3 |
| George Lee | | | 22 | 125-336 | 64-103 | | 314 | 14.2 |
| Jack Lewis | | | 22 | 80-234 | 51-75 | | 211 | 9.5 |
| Terry Miller | | | 22 | 64-170 | 32-52 | | 160 | 7.2 |
| Billy Wright | | | 22 | 41-163 | 24-32 | | 106 | 4.8 |
| Totals | | | 22 | 647-1776 | 390-543 | | 1684 | 76.5 |

== Team players drafted into the NBA ==
Three players from this team were selected in the NBA draft.

| Year | Round | Pick | Overall | Player | NBA Club |
| 1958 | 7 | 6 | 53 | Pete Tillotson | Syracuse Nationals |
| 1959 | 4 | 2 | 24 | George Lee | Detroit Pistons |
| 1959 | 11 | 2 | 73 | M. C. Burton | Detroit Pistons |
