= North American Basketball League (1964–1968) =

- Sport: Basketball
- Founded: 1964
- Ceased: 1968
- No. of teams: 5–8
- Country: United States
- Last champions: Grand Rapids Tackers (1967–1968); Muskegon Panthers (1966–1967); Grand Rapids Tackers (1965–1966); Grand Rapids Tackers (1964–1965)

The first North American Basketball League (NABL) was an American professional basketball league that played from 1964 to 1968. The league played four full seasons, until the league folded after the 1967–1968 season.

== History ==
The North American Basketball League began play in 1964–1965 with five charter franchises, some of whom had been members of the Midwest Professional Basketball League from 1961 to 1964. The Chicago Bombers, Grand Rapids Tackers, Muskegon Panthers, Pontiac Nationals and Twin City Sailors began play in 1964 as charter members. The Chicago and Grand Rapids franchises had been members of the MWL.

In 1965–1966, the Holland Carvers replaced the Pontiac Nationals and the North American Basketball League remained at five teams.

The 1966–1967 North American Basketball League expanded from five to eight teams, adding the Battle Creek Braves, Columbus Comets and Lansing Capitals franchises.

In 1967–1968 the North American Basketball League lost the Muskegon Panthers and the Twin City Sailors teams. Pontiac returned to play and the league played in two divisions. Columbus, Battle Creek, Lansing and Pontiac were the Eastern Division. Chicago, Grand Rapids and Holland comprised the Western Division.

Chicago finished last in each of the four seasons, with Grand Rapids taking three of the four league championships. Porter Meriwether (Chicago) led the league in Scoring in the first three seasons, averaging 28.1, 28.3 and 29.9 points. Art Crump (Battle Creek) averaged 29.6 in 1967–68 to lead the league.

== American Basketball League Franchises (1964–68) ==
- Battle Creek Braves (1964–1968)
- Chicago Bombers (1964–1968)
- Columbus Comets (1964–1968)
- Grand Rapids Tackers (1964–1968)
- Holland Carvers (1965–1968)
- Lansing Capitals (1965–1968)
- Muskegon Panthers (1964–1967)
- Pontiac Nationals (1964–65, 1967–1968)
- Twin City Sailors (1964–1967)

== Notable alumni ==
- Bud Acton, Twin Cities
- M. C. Burton Jr., Grand Rapids
- Bill Chmielewski, Muskegon, Battle Creek
- Gary Bradds, Twin Cities, Columbus
- Bill Buntin, Twin Cities
- Ed Burton, Muskegon
- Larry Comley, Twin Cities
- Johnny Cox Holland, Battle Creek, Muskegon
- Jimmy Darrow, Coach, Muskegon
- Bill Dinwiddie, Columbus
- Sonny Dove, Pontiac
- Ron Dunlap, Chicago
- Boo Ellis, Chicago
- Charles Hardnett, Grand Rapids
- Jerry Harkness, Twin Cities
- Bob Hogsett, Lansing
- Les Hunter, Twin Cities
- Ollie Johnson, Grand Rapids
- Stew Johnson, Twin Cities
- Willie Jones, Grand Rapids
- Arvesta Kelly, Columbus
- Jim Ligon, Holland
- Lonnie Lynn, Columbus
- Billy McGill, Grand Rapids, Holland
- Guy Manning, Battle Creek
- Nick Mantis, Grand Rapids
- Porter Meriwether, Chicago
- Gene Michael, Columbus
- Mel Nowell, Muskegon, Columbus
- Bob Pelkington, Muskegon
- Bill Reigel Coach, Holland,
- Joe Roberts, Muskegon, Columbus
- Tom Thacker, Muskegon
- Skip Thoren, Twin Cities
- Horace Walker, Lansing
- Jim Ware, Muskegon
- Bob Wilkinson, Coach, Grand Rapids
- Bob Woollard, Twin Cities
