= John Egan (basketball) =

American basketball player

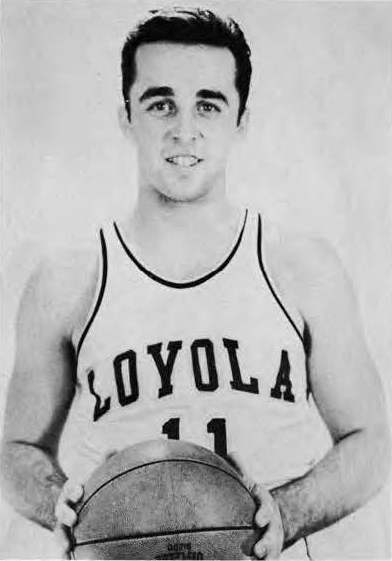
- Egan in 1963

Personal information
- Born: 1942 or 1943 (age 83–84)
- Listed height: 5 ft 10 in (1.78 m)

Career information
- High school: St. Rita (Chicago, Illinois)
- College: Loyola Chicago (1961–1964)
- Position: Point guard
- Number: 11

Career history
- 1964–1967: Twin City Sailors

Career highlights
- NCAA champion (1963); Number 11 retired by Loyola Ramblers

John "Jack" Egan is an American retired basketball player. His playing career is best remembered for his role on the 1962–63 Loyola Ramblers men's basketball team, which won the 1963 NCAA Championship. Egan was the lone white starting player on a team that broke racial barriers by starting four black players in an era when two or three was considered the maximum.

After college, Egan played three years in the short-lived North American Basketball League before retiring from basketball to work as a lawyer.

In 2002, Egan was inducted into the Chicagoland Sports Hall of Fame. The entire 1962–63 Loyola Ramblers team was inducted into the National Collegiate Basketball Hall of Fame in 2013.

== Early life ==
John Egan was born in the early 1940s and grew up in the South Side of Chicago. He was the second-oldest of nine children born to his parents, a police officer and a stay-at-home mother. Egan started playing basketball in elementary school. He played for St. Rita High School, but they never made it past the sectionals of the city tournament. In high school, Egan was scouted by the University of Iowa starting from junior year. The school ultimately offered him a one-year scholarship, but Egan felt he had outplayed others who were given full scholarships, and declined. He was later scouted by Loyola-Chicago coach George Ireland at a Catholic League All-Star game and eventually offered a full scholarship, which he accepted.

== College career ==
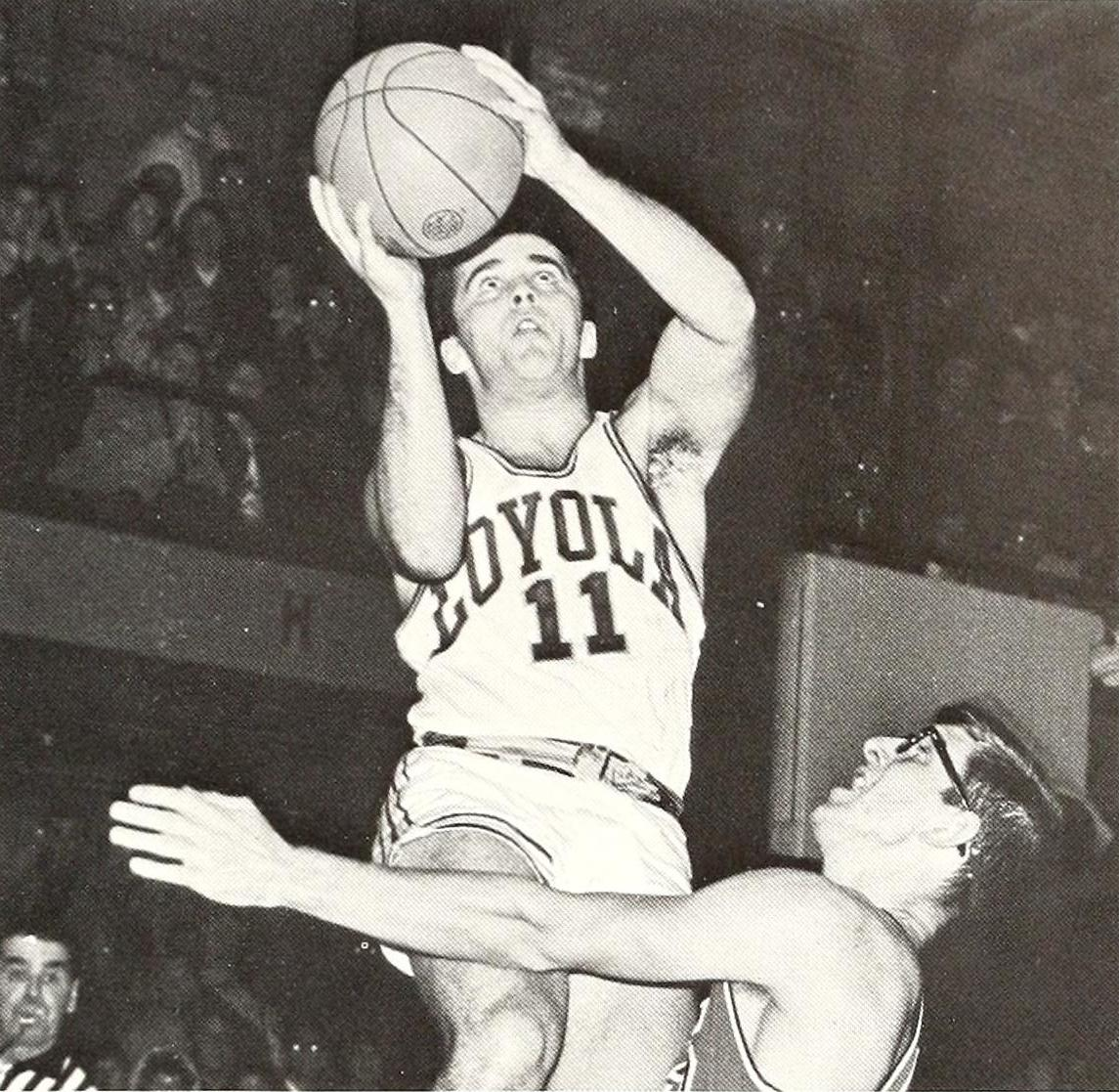
Egan with the Loyola Ramblers in the 1963–64 season

Egan played for Loyola-Chicago starting in the 1961–62 season. That season he played in 27 games and averaged 13.7 points per game.

In the 1962–63 season, Loyola went 24–2 in the regular season, then went on to win the 1963 NCAA University Division basketball tournament. Egan again averaged 13.7 points across 31 games.

In the 1963–64 season, Egan averaged 18.5 points across 28 games. Loyola finished 22–5 but lost in the second round of the NCAA Tournament to Michigan, which Egan attributed to poor team chemistry.

== After college ==
After graduating Loyola, Egan played three years in the short-lived North American Basketball League. From 1964 to 1967, he played for the Twin City Sailors along with his former Loyola teammates Jerry Harkness and Les Hunter.

He also studied at Loyola University Chicago School of Law. He worked in the Cook County State's Attorney's office in the late 1960s before starting his own criminal defense practice.

In 1980, he moved to the Chicago-area village of River Forest, Illinois, having previously lived in the village of Riverside, Illinois. He has five children, two of them from his current marriage to Mary Egan, whom he met at the law office. Egan was one of several former Loyola players who was a fixture in the stands during the Ramblers' 2018 run to the Final Four.

== Career playing statistics ==
Legend
GP	Games played	GS	Games started	MPG	Minutes per game
FG%	Field goal percentage	3P%	3-point field goal percentage	FT%	Free throw percentage
RPG	Rebounds per game	APG	Assists per game	SPG	Steals per game
BPG	Blocks per game	PPG	Points per game	**Bold**	Career high
*	Led the league

=== NBA ===
==== Regular season ====
Year	Team	GP	MPG	FG%	FT%	RPG	APG	PPG
1961–62	Detroit	58	12.0	.425	.762	1.5	1.8	5.5
1962–63	Detroit	46	16.3	.372	.768	1.3	2.5	5.9
1963–64	Detroit	24	34.9	.410	.838	2.6	4.8	11.1
1963–64	New York	42	**35.4**	.456	.777	**3.1**	**5.8**	**14.1**
1964–65	New York	74	22.5	**.488**	.814	1.9	3.4	9.2
1965–66	New York	7	8.3	.313	.700	.3	2.0	2.4
1965–66	Baltimore	69	23.0	.455	.765	2.6	3.8	9.8
1966–67	Baltimore	71	24.5	.428	.845	2.5	3.9	10.1
1967–68	Baltimore	67	13.9	.393	.776	1.7	2.0	7.0
1968–69	L.A. Lakers	**82**	22.0	.412	.850	1.8	2.6	8.5
1969–70	L.A. Lakers	72	22.6	.438	.818	1.4	3.0	7.3
1970–71	Cleveland	26	15.8	.408	**.893**	1.2	2.2	4.0
1970–71	San Diego	36	11.5	.338	.739	.9	1.5	2.0
1971–72	Houston	38	11.5	.404	.813	.7	1.3	2.9
Career		712	20.3	.429	.805	1.8	3.0	7.8

==== Playoffs ====
Year	Team	GP	MPG	FG%	FT%	RPG	APG	PPG
1962	Detroit	5	19.4	.468	**1.000**	1.8	3.2	13.6
1966	Baltimore	3	**39.0**	.404	.625	**3.0**	**7.7**	**16.0**
1969	L.A. Lakers	**18***	31.7	.433	.788	2.4	3.9	13.9
1970	L.A. Lakers	16	10.1	.535	.909	.3	1.4	3.5
Career		42	22.5	.447	.795	1.6	3.1	10.1

== Head coaching record ==
Legend
Regular season	G	Games coached	W	Games won	L	Games lost	W–L %	Win–loss %
Playoffs	PG	Playoff games	PW	Playoff wins	PL	Playoff losses	PW–L %	Playoff win–loss %

=== NBA ===
Team	Year	G	W	L	W–L%	Finish	PG	PW	PL	PW–L%	Result
Houston	1972–73	35	16	19	.457	3rd in Central	—	—	—	—	Missed playoffs
Houston	1973–74	82	32	50	.390	3rd in Central	—	—	—	—	Missed playoffs
Houston	1974–75	82	41	421	.500	2nd in Central	8	3	5	.375	Lost in Conference semifinals
Houston	1975–76	82	40	42	.488	3rd in Central	—	—	—	—	Missed playoffs
Career		281	129	152	.459		8	3	5	.375	
