= 1963 NBA draft =

Basketball player selection

General information
- Sport: Basketball
- Dates: April 30, 1963 (Rounds 1–7); May 7, 1963 (Rounds 8–15)
- Location: Plaza Hotel (New York City, New York)

Overview
- 84 total selections in 15 rounds
- League: NBA
- Territorial picks: Tom Thacker, Cincinnati Royals
- First selection: Art Heyman, New York Knicks
- Hall of Famers: 2: F Nate Thurmond; F Gus Johnson

The 1963 NBA draft was the 17th annual draft of the National Basketball Association (NBA). The draft was held on April 30 and May 7, 1963, before the 1963–64 season. In this draft, nine NBA teams took turns selecting amateur U.S. college basketball players. A player who had finished his four-year college eligibility was eligible for selection. If a player left college early, he would not be eligible for selection until his college class graduated. In each round, the teams select in reverse order of their win–loss record in the previous season. Before the draft, a team could forfeit its first-round draft pick and then select any player from within a 50-mile radius of its home arena as their territorial pick. The Chicago Zephyrs relocated to Baltimore and became the Baltimore Bullets prior to the draft. The Syracuse Nationals participated in the draft, but relocated to Philadelphia and became the Philadelphia 76ers prior to the start of the season. The draft consisted of 15 rounds comprising 84 players selected.
This draft holds the record for the fewest non-territorial picks who later debuted in the NBA, with 17 (18 if the territorial pick Tom Thacker is included).

== Draft selections and draftee career notes ==
Tom Thacker from the University of Cincinnati was selected before the draft as Cincinnati Royals' territorial pick. Art Heyman from Duke University was selected first overall by the New York Knicks. Two players from this draft, Nate Thurmond and Gus Johnson, have been inducted to the Basketball Hall of Fame. Thurmond was also named in the 50 Greatest Players in NBA History list announced at the league's 50th anniversary in 1996. Thurmond's achievements include seven All-Star Game selections and five All-Defensive Team selections. Johnson's achievement include four All-NBA Team selections and five All-Star Game selections. Two players from this draft, 4th pick Eddie Miles and 13th pick Jim King, have also been selected to an All-Star Game.

Reggie Harding, who was the first player drafted out of high school when he was drafted the previous year, was drafted again by the Detroit Pistons with the 48th pick. He finally enter the league after spending a year in the Midwest Professional Basketball League (MPBL) due to the rules that prevent a high school player to play in the league until one year after his high school class graduated. Larry Brown from the University of North Carolina was selected with the 55th pick. However, he never played in the NBA. He spent his playing career within the Amateur Athletic Union (AAU) before joining the newly formed American Basketball Association (ABA) in 1967. He played there for five seasons, earning one All-ABA Team selection and three ABA All-Star Game selections. After his playing career, he became a head coach. He coached nine NBA teams, most recently with the Charlotte Bobcats (now Charlotte Hornets). He won the NBA championship with the Detroit Pistons in 2004 and went to the NBA Finals two other times; with the Philadelphia 76ers in 2001 and with the Pistons in 2005. In between his NBA coaching career, he also coached the Kansas Jayhawks of the University of Kansas for five seasons, winning the National Collegiate Athletic Association (NCAA) championship in 1988. He is the only coach to win both an NCAA title and an NBA championship. As a player, he won the gold medal with the United States national basketball team at the 1964 Olympic Games. He then coached the U.S. national team to a bronze medal at the 2004 Olympic Games, becoming the only U.S. male basketball participant to both play and coach in the Olympics. Rod Thorn, the 2nd pick, also had a coaching career. He was the interim head coach of the Chicago Bulls in 1982.

== Key ==
Pos.	G	F	C
Position	Guard	Forward	Center

^	Denotes player who has been inducted to the Naismith Memorial Basketball Hall of Fame
^{+}	Denotes player who has been selected for at least one All-Star Game
^{#}	Denotes player who has never appeared in an NBA regular-season or playoff game

== Draft ==
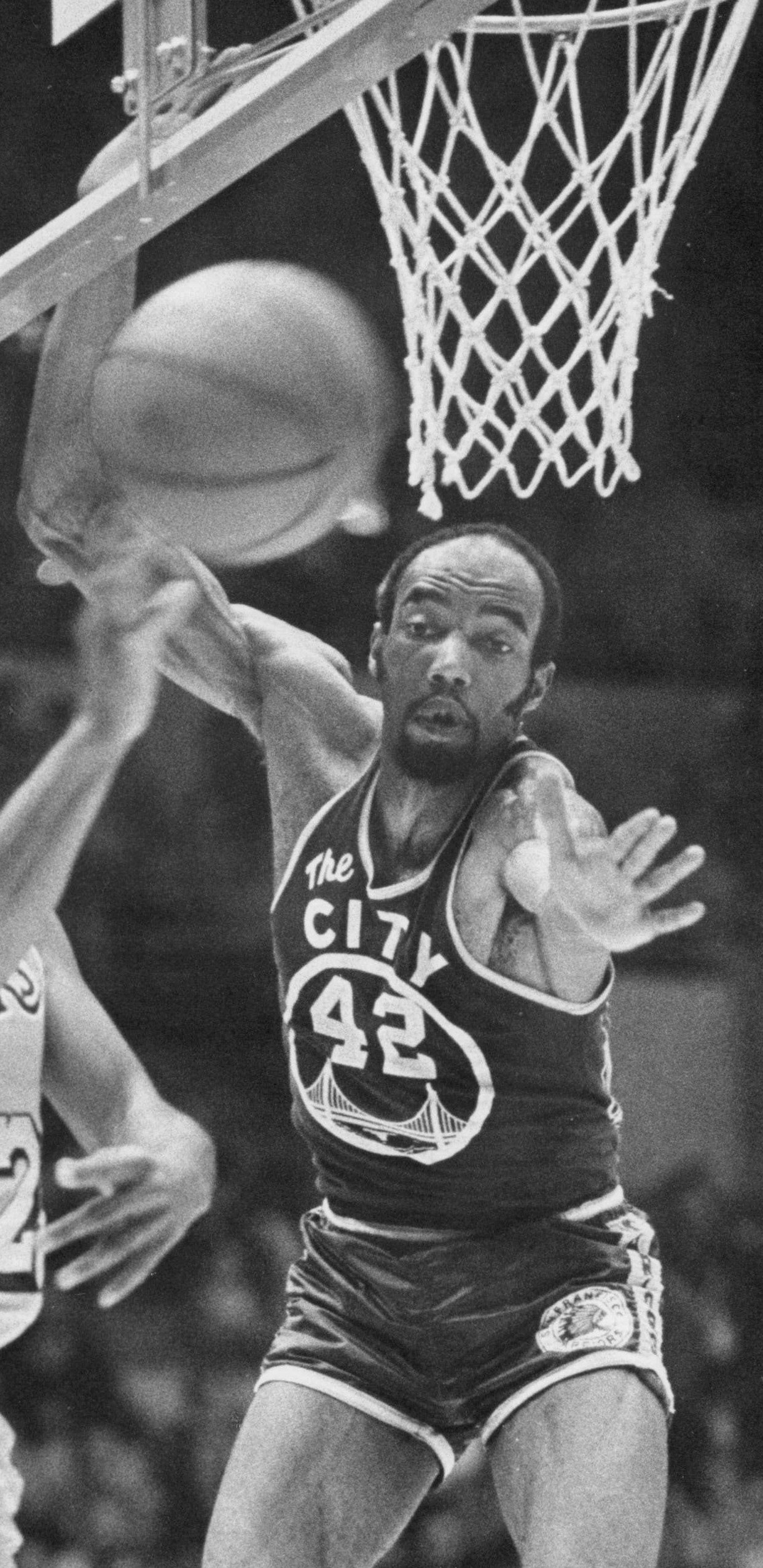
Nate Thurmond was selected third overall by the San Francisco Warriors.

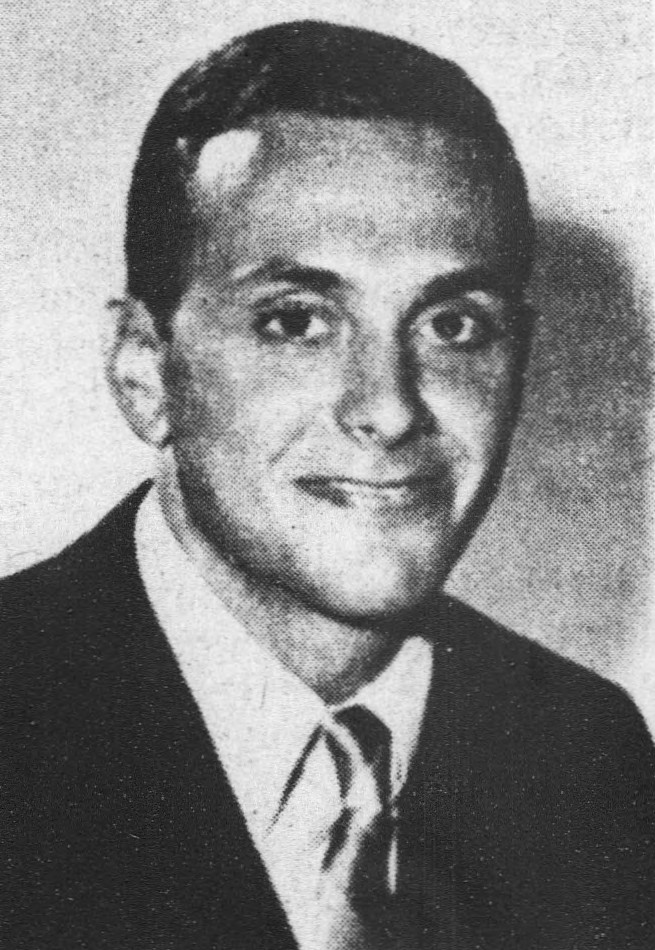
Larry Brown was selected 55th overall by the Baltimore Bullets, but did not play in the NBA.

Rnd.	Pick	Player	Pos.	Nationality (Note: Nationality indicates the player's national team or representative nationality. If a player has not competed at the international level, then the nationality indicates the national team which the player is eligible to represent according to FIBA rules.)	Team	School / club team
T	–	Tom Thacker	G/F	United States	Cincinnati Royals	Cincinnati (Sr.)
1	1	Art Heyman	G/F	United States	New York Knicks	Duke (Sr.)
1	2	Rod Thorn	G	United States	Baltimore Bullets	West Virginia (Sr.)
1	3	Nate Thurmond^	F/C	United States	San Francisco Warriors	Bowling Green (Sr.)
1	4	Eddie Miles^{+}	G/F	United States	Detroit Pistons	Seattle (Sr.)
1	5	Gerry Ward	G	United States	St. Louis Hawks	Boston College (Sr.)
1	6	Tom Hoover	C	United States	Syracuse Nationals	Camden Bullets (EPBL)
1	7	Roger Strickland	F	United States	Los Angeles Lakers	Jacksonville (Sr.)
1	8	Bill Green^{#}	F	United States	Boston Celtics	Colorado State (Sr.)
2	9	Jerry Harkness	G	United States	New York Knicks	Loyola (IL) (Sr.)
2	10	Gus Johnson^	F/C	United States	Baltimore Bullets	Idaho (Sr.)
2	11	Gary Hill	G	United States	San Francisco Warriors	Oklahoma City (Sr.)
2	12	Jerry Smith^{#}	G	United States	Detroit Pistons	Furman (Sr.)
2	13	Jim King^{+}	G	United States	Los Angeles Lakers (from Cincinnati)^{[a]}	Tulsa (Sr.)
2	14	Leland Mitchell^{#}	G	United States	St. Louis Hawks	Mississippi State (Sr.)
2	15	Hershell West^{#}	G	United States	Syracuse Nationals	Grambling (Sr.)
2	16	Mel Gibson	G	United States	Los Angeles Lakers	Western Carolina (Sr.)
2	17	Kenny Saylors^{#}	F	United States	St. Louis Hawks (from Boston)	Arkansas Tech (Sr.)
3	18	Bill O'Connor^{#}	F	United States	New York Knicks	Canisius (Sr.)
3	19	Tom Bolyard^{#}	G	United States	Baltimore Bullets	Indiana (Sr.)
3	20	Steve Gray^{#}	G	United States	San Francisco Warriors	Saint Mary's (Sr.)
3	21	Mike McCoy^{#}	C	United States	Detroit Pistons	Miami (Florida) (Sr.)
3	22	Jimmy Rayl^{#}	G	United States	Cincinnati Royals	Indiana (Sr.)
3	23	Bill Burwell^{#}	G	United States	St. Louis Hawks	Illinois (Sr.)
3	24	Jerry Greenspan	F	United States	Syracuse Nationals	Maryland (Sr.)
3	25	Lyle Harger^{#}	F	United States	Los Angeles Lakers	Houston (Sr.)
3	26	Chuck Kriston^{#}	G	United States	Boston Celtics	Valparaiso (Sr.)
4	27	Nate Cloud^{#}	F	United States	New York Knicks	Delaware (Sr.)
4	28	Nolen Ellison^{#}	G	United States	Baltimore Bullets	Kansas (Sr.)
4	29	Dave Downey^{#}	G	United States	San Francisco Warriors	Illinois (Sr.)
4	30	Dave Erickso^{#}	C	United States	Detroit Pistons	Marquette (Sr.)
4	31	Ken Charlton^{#}	F	United States	Cincinnati Royals	Colorado (Sr.)
4	32	Waite Bellamy^{#}	G	United States	St. Louis Hawks	Florida A&M (Sr.)
4	33	Ray Flynn^{#}	G	United States	Philadelphia 76ers	Providence (Sr.)
4	34	Layton Johns^{#}	C	United States	Los Angeles Lakers	Auburn (Sr.)
4	35	Connie McGuire^{#}	F	United States	Boston Celtics	Southeastern State (Sr.)
5	36	Joe McDermott^{#}	F	United States	New York Knicks	Belmont Abbey (Sr.)
5	37	Ron Glaser^{#}	G	United States	Baltimore Bullets	Marquette (Sr.)
5	38	Don Turner^{#}	F	United States	San Francisco Warriors	Southwestern (Kansas) (Sr.)
5	39	Bill Small^{#}	G	United States	Detroit Pistons	Illinois (Sr.)
5	40	Mack Herndon^{#}	C	United States	Cincinnati Royals	Bradley (Sr.)
5	41	Tony Yates^{#}	G	United States	St. Louis Hawks	Cincinnati (Sr.)
5	42	Tony Cerkvenik^{#}	G	United States	Philadelphia 76ers	Arizona State (Sr.)
5	43	Larry Jones	G/F	United States	Los Angeles Lakers	Toledo (Jr.)
5	44	Red Stroud^{#}	G	United States	Boston Celtics	Mississippi State (Sr.)
6	45	Jim Kerwin^{#}	G	United States	New York Knicks	Tulane (Sr.)
6	46	Ken Siebel^{#}	F	United States	Baltimore Bullets	Wisconsin (Sr.)
6	47	Gene Shields^{#}	F	United States	San Francisco Warriors	Santa Clara (Sr.)
6	48	Reggie Harding	C	United States	Detroit Pistons	Holland Oilers (MPBL)
6	49	Jim McCormick^{#}	G	United States	Cincinnati Royals	West Virginia (Sr.)
6	50	Al Santio^{#}	F	United States	St. Louis Hawks	Maryland Eastern Shore (Sr.)
6	51	Vince Brewer^{#}	G	United States	Philadelphia 76ers	Iowa State (Sr.)
6	52	Warren Sallade^{#}	G	United States	Los Angeles Lakers	Westminster (Pennsylvania) (Sr.)
6	53	Vinnie Ernst^{#}	G	United States	Boston Celtics	Providence (Sr.)
7	54	Bob Woollard^{#}	C	United States	New York Knicks	Wake Forest (Sr.)
7	55	Larry Brown^{#}	G	United States	Baltimore Bullets	North Carolina (Sr.)
7	56	Don Clemetson^{#}	G	United States	San Francisco Warriors	Stanford (Sr.)
7	57	Ira Harge^{#}	C	United States	Detroit Pistons	New Mexico (Jr.)
7	58	Hunter Beckman^{#}	F	United States	Cincinnati Royals	Memphis (Sr.)
7	59	Ken Rohloff	G	United States	St. Louis Hawks	NC State (Sr.)
7	60	Bill Brown^{#}	F	United States	Philadelphia 76ers	Howard Payne (Sr.)
7	61	Gordie Martin^{#}	F	United States	Los Angeles Lakers	USC (Sr.)
7	62	Herb Magee^{#}	G	United States	Boston Celtics	Philadelphia Textile (Sr.)
8	63	Freddie Crawford	G/F	United States	New York Knicks	St. Bonaventure (Jr.)
8	64	Rich Froistad^{#}	F	United States	Baltimore Bullets	Iowa State (Sr.)
8	65	Harry Dinnel^{#}	F	United States	San Francisco Warriors	Pepperdine (Sr.)
8	66	Gary Silc^{#}	F	Canada	Detroit Pistons	Northern Michigan (Sr.)
8	67	Harold Ray Strother^{#}	G	United States	St. Louis Hawks	Wilkes-Barre Barons (EPBL)
9	68	Ray Cronk^{#}	F	United States	New York Knicks	Lakeland (Sr.)
9	69	Ron Jackson^{#}	F	United States	Baltimore Bullets	Wisconsin (Sr.)
9	70	Chuck White^{#}	F	United States	San Francisco Warriors	Idaho (Sr.)
9	71	Ernie Dunston^{#}	F	United States	Detroit Pistons	Seattle (Sr.)
9	72	Frank Davis^{#}	G	United States	St. Louis Hawks	Oklahoma Christian (Sr.)
10	73	Gerald Glur^{#}	F	United States	New York Knicks	Furman (Sr.)
10	74	M. C. Thompson^{#}	F	United States	Baltimore Bullets	DePaul (Sr.)
10	75	Carl Ritter^{#}	G	United States	St. Louis Hawks	Southeast Missouri State (Sr.)
11	76	Orb Bowling^{#}	C	United States	New York Knicks	Tennessee (Sr.)
11	77	Marv Straw^{#}	G	United States	St. Louis Hawks	Iowa State (Sr.)
12	78	Bob Walters^{#}	G	United States	New York Knicks	Baldwin–Wallace (Sr.)
12	79	Hugh Evans^{#}	G	United States	St. Louis Hawks	North Carolina A&T (Sr.)
13	80	Jerry Szachara^{#}	G	United States	New York Knicks	Cornell (Sr.)
13	81	Gary McFarland^{#}	G	United States	St. Louis Hawks	Central Missouri (Sr.)
14	82	Bill Raftery^{#}	G	United States	New York Knicks	La Salle (Sr.)
15	83	Ron Pickett^{#}	F	United States	New York Knicks	Eastern Kentucky (Sr.)

== Notable undrafted players ==
These players were not selected in the 1963 draft but played at least one game in the NBA.

Player	Pos.	Nationality	School/club team
George Lehmann	G	United States	Sunbury Mercuries (EPBL)
Bob Warlick	G	United States	Pepperdine
Art Williams	G	United States	Cal Poly Pomona

== Trades ==
- ^{a} On September 14, 1962, the Los Angeles Lakers acquired the second-round pick of the Cincinnati Royals in exchange for Tom Hawkins. The Lakers used the pick to draft Jim King.

== See also ==
- List of first overall NBA draft picks
