= Fran Smith (publicist) =

Francis E. Smith (May 28, 1923 – November 24, 2002) was an American publicist and journalist who was the public relations director for the Detroit Pistons and Windsor Raceway and a sportswriter for the Detroit Times.

== Early life ==
Smith was a native of Mount Clemens, Michigan. He served in the United States Army during World War II and studied journalism at the University of Michigan following his discharge. He spent six years as the sports editor of the Mount Clemens Daily Monitor Leader and covered high school and college football and basketball for the Detroit Times from 1952 to 1957.

Smith was named publicity director of the National Basketball Association's Detroit Pistons shortly after the team relocated from Fort Wayne, Indiana. In January 1961 he was promoted to director of staff. Smith was responsible for the NBA's first high school draftee when the Pistons selected Reggie Harding, who had graduated from high school but did not enroll in a college, in the 1962 NBA draft. Smith left the Pistons on August 1, 1965, to work for Lou Van's Men's Store in Mount Clemens.

In 1966, Smith became the director of public relations of Windsor Raceway. He was let go after the 1966–67 racing season. In 1968, Smith purchased two Grand Rapids area newspapers – the Lowell Ledger and Ada Suburban Life. He was rehired at Windsor Raceway in 1970. In addition to serving as the track's public relations director, Smith also co-hosted the televised replay of the track's race card on CKLW-TV He also worked as advertising and public relations consultant for Maywood Park and Northfield Park. Smith left Windsor Raceway in 1978 and worked for the Anthony Franco public relations firm in Detroit. He later held public relations positions at Northfield Park (1979), Painesville Raceway (1979–80), and Liberty Bell Park Racetrack (1980–81).

== Personal life ==
Smith and his wife, Betty, had eleven children and resided in Mount Clemens. He died on November 24, 2002, at Port Huron Hospital following a brief illness.
