= 1967–68 Indiana Pacers season =

ABA professional basketball team season

- Head coach: Larry Staverman
- Arena: Indiana State Fair Coliseum

Results
- Record: 38–40 (.487)
- Place: Division: 3rd (Eastern)
- Playoff finish: Division Semifinals (lost to Pipers 0–3)
- Stats at Basketball Reference

Local media
- Television: WLWI 13
- Radio: WIRE

The 1967–68 Indiana Pacers season was Indiana's first season in the ABA and its first as a team.

During the first season, the Pacers played most of their games at Indiana State Fairgrounds Coliseum, but they staged a handful of games across Indiana to help build attention for the team, playing one game in Fort Wayne, Shelbyville, New Castle, Madison along with two in Kokomo.

== ABA Draft ==
Round	Pick	Player	Position(s)	College
1	1	Jimmy Walker	SG	Providence
2	22	Bob Netolicky	PF/C	Drake

== Roster ==
1967–68 Indiana Pacers roster
Players

Pos.	No.	Player	Height	Weight	DOB	From
PF	45	Matthew Aitch	6 ft 7 in (2.01 m)	230 lb (104 kg)	September 21, 1944	Michigan State
SF	30	Ron Bonham	6 ft 5 in (1.96 m)	192 lb (87 kg)	May 31, 1942	Cincinnati
SF	35	Roger Brown	6 ft 5 in (1.96 m)	205 lb (93 kg)	May 22, 1942	George W. Wingate High School
PF	33	Ollie Darden	6 ft 7 in (2.01 m)	235 lb (107 kg)	July 28, 1944	Michigan
PG	12	Jimmy Dawson	6 ft 0 in (1.83 m)	175 lb (79 kg)	April 18, 1945	Illinois
SF	44	Bobby Joe Edmonds	6 ft 6 in (1.98 m)	220 lb (100 kg)	March 8, 1941	Tennessee State
C	32	Reggie Harding	7 ft 0 in (2.13 m)	249 lb (113 kg)	May 4, 1942	Nashville Christian Institute
PG	15	Jerry Harkness	6 ft 2 in (1.88 m)	175 lb (79 kg)	May 7, 1940	Loyola University of Chicago
SF	42	Ronald Kozlicki	6 ft 7 in (2.01 m)	215 lb (98 kg)	December 12, 1944	Northwestern
PG	14	Freddie Lewis	6 ft 0 in (1.83 m)	175 lb (79 kg)	July 1, 1943	Arizona State
PF	24	Bob Netolicky	6 ft 9 in (2.06 m)	220 lb (100 kg)	August 2, 1942	Drake
C	43	George Peeples	6 ft 7 in (2.01 m)	190 lb (86 kg)	October 30, 1943	Iowa
PG	23	Jimmy Rayl	6 ft 2 in (1.88 m)	175 lb (79 kg)	June 21, 1941	Indiana

Coaches
Head coach
- Larry Staverman

Legend
- (DP) Unsigned draft pick
- (FA) Free agent
- (S) Suspended
- Injured

Roster

== Season standings ==
=== Eastern Division ===
Team	W	L	Pct.
Pittsburgh Pipers	54	24	.692
Minnesota Muskies	50	28	.641
Indiana Pacers	38	40	.487
Kentucky Colonels	36	42	.462
New Jersey Americans	36	42	.462

=== Western Division ===
Team	W	L	Pct.
New Orleans Buccaneers	48	30	.615
Dallas Chaparrals	46	32	.590
Denver Rockets	45	33	.577
Houston Mavericks	29	49	.372
Anaheim Amigos	25	53	.321
Oakland Oaks	22	56	.282

== Awards, records, and honors ==
=== ABA All-Stars ===
- Roger Brown
- Mel Daniels
- Bob Netolicky

== ABA Playoffs ==
ABA Eastern Division Semifinals

1968 playoff game log
ABA Eastern Division Semifinals: 0–3 (home: 0–1; road: 0–2)

Game	Date	Team	Score	High points	High rebounds	High assists	Location Attendance	Series
1	March 25	@ Pittsburgh	L 127–146	Roger Brown (32)	Roger Brown (12)	Jimmy Rayl (6)	Civic Arena	0–1
2	March 26	Pittsburgh	L 108–121	Freddie Lewis (21)	Ollie Darden (16)	Roger Brown (7)	Indiana State Fairgrounds Coliseum	0–2
3	March 27	@ Pittsburgh	L 114–133	Freddie Lewis (32)	George Peeples (20)	Roger Brown (10)	Civic Arena	0–3

1968 schedule

== Team leaders ==
Stat	Player	Average
Points	Freddie Lewis	20.6
Rebounds	Bob Netolicky	11.5
Assists	Roger Brown	4.3
Win shares	Freddie Lewis	7.5
