= Midwest Professional Basketball League =

American basketball league

- Sport: Basketball
- Founded: 1961
- Folded: 1964
- No. of teams: 6
- Country: United States
- Last champions: Gary Whips (1961–1962); Holland Oilers (1962–1963); Grand Rapids Tackers (1963–1964)

The Midwest Professional Basketball League was a professional American basketball league. The six–team league existed for three seasons, playing from 1961–1962 through 1963–1964 until the league folded after the 1964 season.

== History and Franchises ==
The league was composed of six teams per season. The charter members of the Midwest Professional Basketball League in 1961–1962 were the Battle Creek Warriors, Dayton Little Mickeys, East Chicago Bombers, Gary Whips, Terre Haute All–Stars and Toledo Twisters. The Gary Whips had the best league record at 9–4.

In 1962–1963, Battle Creek and Terre Haute did not return to Midwest Professional Basketball League play and were replaced by Holland and Grand Rapids franchises. The second season teams were the Chicago Bombers, Dayton Mickeys, Grand Rapids Tackers, Gary Whips, Holland Oilers and Toledo Tartans. The Holland Oilers defeated Toledo for the MPBL Championship.

In 1963–1964, the Midwest Professional Basketball League began the season with five teams and dropped to four, with the season divided into halves. Gary folded after the first half. The five teams to begin the season were the Battle Creek Warriors, Chicago Bombers, Gary Steelers, Grand Rapids Tackers and Holland Oilers. Grand Rapids won both halves and played the Allentown Jets of the Eastern Professional Basketball League in a post season championship. Allentown won the game by the score of 128–126.

== League Notes ==
The 1963–1964 Most Valuable Player was Nick Mantis of Grand Rapids.

The 1962–1963 First Team: Charlie North, Grand Rapids; Willie Merriweather, Holland; M.C. Burton, Toledo; George Knighton, Dayton; Floyd Campbell, Gary.

The 1963–1964 First Team:Nick Mantis, Grand Rapids; Ed Burton, Holland; Willie Lee Bond, Chicago; M.C. Burton, Grand Rapids; Willie Merriweather, Holland.

Reggie Harding, the first high school player ever drafted by the NBA played for Holland. Holland was owned and coached by Gene Schrotenboer and played at the Holland Civic Center.

== Notable alumni ==
- Joe Buckhalter, Dayton
- M. C. Burton Jr., Toledo
- Ed Burton, Howell
- Johnny Cox, Holland, Battle Creek
- Jimmy Darrow, Holland
- Don Goldstein. Terre Haute
- Chuck Grigsby, Dayton
- Reggie Harding, Holland
- Ron Kramer, Battle Creek, Toledo
- Nick Mantis, Grand Rapids
- Porter Meriwether, Chicago
- John Tidwell, Battle Creek
- Pete Tillotson, Holland
- Dave Zeller, Dayton

== Midwest Professional Basketball League Franchises (1961–1964) ==
Battle Creek Warriors 1961–62, 1963–64

East Chicago Bombers 1961–62,
Chicago Bombers 1962-63 to 1963-64

Dayton Little Mickeys 1961–62,
Dayton Mickeys 1962–63

Gary Steelers 1963–64,
Gary Whips 1961–62 to 1962–63

Grand Rapids Tackers 1962–63 to 1963–64

Holland Oilers 1962–63 to 1963–64

Terre Haute All-Stars 1961–62

Toledo Twisters 1961–62,
Toledo Tartans 1962–63
