= 1957–58 Indiana Hoosiers men's basketball team =

American college basketball season

1957–58 Indiana Hoosiers men's basketball

Big Ten Champions

NCAA Men's Division I Tournament, Regional Third Place
- Conference: Big Ten Conference

Ranking
- Coaches: No. 10
- AP: No. 12
- Record: 13–11 (10–4 Big Ten)
- Head coach: Branch McCracken (17th season)
- Assistant coaches: Lou Watson; Ernie Andres
- Captain: Pete Obremskey
- Home arena: The Fieldhouse

1957–58 Big Ten Conference men's basketball standings
	Conf.				Overall
Team	W		L	PCT	W		L	PCT
No. 12 Indiana	10	–	4	.714	13	–	11	.542
No. 17 Michigan State	9	–	5	.643	16	–	6	.727
Purdue	9	–	5	.643	14	–	8	.636
Northwestern	8	–	6	.571	13	–	9	.591
Ohio State	8	–	6	.571	9	–	13	.409
Iowa	7	–	7	.500	13	–	9	.591
Michigan	6	–	8	.429	11	–	11	.500
Illinois	5	–	9	.357	11	–	11	.500
Minnesota	5	–	9	.357	9	–	12	.429
Wisconsin	3	–	11	.214	8	–	14	.364
Rankings from AP Poll

The 1957–58 Indiana Hoosiers men's basketball team represented Indiana University. Their head coach was Branch McCracken, who was in his 17th year. The team played its home games in The Fieldhouse in Bloomington, Indiana, and was a member of the Big Ten Conference.

The Hoosiers finished the regular season with an overall record of 13–11 and a conference record of 10–4, finishing 1st in the Big Ten Conference. As Big Ten Conference Champions, Indiana was invited to participate in the NCAA tournament, where the Hoosiers advanced to Regional Third Place.

== Roster ==
No.	Name	Position	Ht.	Year	Hometown
13	Bob Reinhart	G	5–10	So.	Dale, Indiana
15	Sam Gee	G	6–1	Sr.	Washington, Indiana
20	Al Schlegelmilch	G	6–1	So.	Monticello, Indiana
22	Archie Dees	C	6–8	Sr.	Mount Carmel, Illinois
23	Stan Hill	G	5–10	So.	Seymour, Indiana
24	Ray Ball	F	6–3	Sr.	Elkhart, Indiana
30	Lee Aldridge	C	6–6	Jr.	Switz City, Indiana
31	Norbert Witte	C	6–7	So.	Decatur, Indiana
31	Jim Hinds	F	6–5	Jr.	Muncie, Indiana
32	Gene Flowers	F	6–2	Jr.	Muncie, Indiana
33	Frank Radovich	F	6–7	So.	Hammond, Indiana
42	Bill Balch	F	6–5	Jr.	Crawfordsville, Indiana
43	Pete Obremskey	F	6–3	Sr.	Jeffersonville, Indiana
44	Bob Wilkinson	G	6–1	So.	LaPorte, Indiana
45	Jerry Thompson	F	6–5	Sr.	South Bend, Indiana

== Schedule/results ==
Date time, TV	Rank^{#}	Opponent^{#}	Result	Record	Site city, state
Regular season
12/2/1957*		Ohio	L 68–76	0–1	The Fieldhouse; Bloomington, IN
12/7/1957*		Kansas State	L 61–66	0–2	The Fieldhouse; Bloomington, IN
12/14/1957*		at Missouri	L 73–78	0–3	Brewer Fieldhouse; Columbia, MO
12/19/1957*		Saint Mary's	W 79–66	1–3	The Fieldhouse; Bloomington, IN
12/23/1957*		Oregon State	L 51–62	1–4	The Fieldhouse; Bloomington, IN
12/27/1957*		at Butler; Hoosier Classic	L 78–84	1–5	Butler Fieldhouse; Indianapolis, IN
12/28/1957*		vs. Notre Dame; Hoosier Classic	L 74–89	1–6	Butler Fieldhouse; Indianapolis, IN
1/4/1958		Northwestern	W 68–65	2–6 (1–0)	The Fieldhouse; Bloomington, IN
1/6/1958		at Purdue; Rivalry	L 66–68	2–7 (1–1)	Lambert Fieldhouse; West Lafayette, IN
1/11/1958		Illinois; Rivalry	W 89–82	3–7 (2–1)	The Fieldhouse; Bloomington, IN
1/13/1958		Minnesota	W 85–64	4–7 (3–1)	The Fieldhouse; Bloomington, IN
1/18/1958		at Iowa	L 75–79	4–8 (3–2)	Iowa Field House; Iowa City, IA
2/1/1958*		at DePaul	W 76–66	5–8 (3–2)	Alumni Hall; Chicago, IL
2/3/1958		at Minnesota	L 66–69	5–9 (3–3)	Williams Arena; Minneapolis, MN
2/8/1958		Michigan State	W 82–79	6–9 (4–3)	The Fieldhouse; Bloomington, IN
2/10/1958		at Wisconsin	W 93–87	7–9 (5–3)	Wisconsin Field House; Madison, WI
2/17/1958		Ohio State	L 83–93	7–10 (5–4)	The Fieldhouse; Bloomington, IN
2/22/1958		at Ohio State	W 88–83	8–10 (6–4)	St. John Arena; Columbus, OH
2/24/1958		Michigan	W 95–88	9–10 (7–4)	The Fieldhouse; Bloomington, IN
3/1/1958		Purdue; Rivalry	W 109–95	10–10 (8–4)	The Fieldhouse; Bloomington, IN
3/3/1958		at Illinois; Rivalry	W 96–86	11–10 (9–4)	Huff Hall; Champaign, IL
3/8/1958		at Michigan State	W 75–72	12–10 (10–4)	Jenison Fieldhouse; East Lansing, MI
NCAA tournament
3/14/1958*	No. 12	vs. Notre Dame; Regional semifinals	L 87–94	12–11 (10–4)	Memorial Coliseum; Lexington, KY
3/15/1958*	No. 12	vs. Miami (OH); Regional Third Place	W 98–91	13–11 (10–4)	Memorial Coliseum; Lexington, KY
*Non-conference game. ^{#}Rankings from AP Poll. (#) Tournament seedings in parentheses.
