= 1957–58 Wisconsin Badgers men's basketball team =

American college basketball season

1957–58 Wisconsin Badgers men's basketball
- Conference: Big Ten Conference
- Record: 8–14 (3–11 Big Ten)
- Head coach: Harold E. Foster
- Home arena: UW Fieldhouse

1957–58 Big Ten Conference men's basketball standings
	Conf.				Overall
Team	W		L	PCT	W		L	PCT
No. 12 Indiana	10	–	4	.714	13	–	11	.542
No. 17 Michigan State	9	–	5	.643	16	–	6	.727
Purdue	9	–	5	.643	14	–	8	.636
Northwestern	8	–	6	.571	13	–	9	.591
Ohio State	8	–	6	.571	9	–	13	.409
Iowa	7	–	7	.500	13	–	9	.591
Michigan	6	–	8	.429	11	–	11	.500
Illinois	5	–	9	.357	11	–	11	.500
Minnesota	5	–	9	.357	9	–	12	.429
Wisconsin	3	–	11	.214	8	–	14	.364
Rankings from AP Poll

The 1957–58 Wisconsin Badgers men's basketball team represented University of Wisconsin–Madison. The head coach was Harold E. Foster, coaching his twenty-fourth season with the Badgers. The team played their home games at the UW Fieldhouse in Madison, Wisconsin and was a member of the Big Ten Conference.

== Schedule ==
Date time, TV	Rank^{#}	Opponent^{#}	Result	Record	Site city, state
Regular Season
12/02/1957*		South Dakota	W 63–56	1–0	UW Fieldhouse; Madison, WI
12/07/1957*		Notre Dame	L 53–75	1–1	UW Fieldhouse; Madison, WI
12/09/1957*		at Washington U. (MO)	W 43–33	2–1	Washington U Field House; St. Louis, MO
12/16/1957*		Rice	W 67–62	3–1	UW Fieldhouse; Madison, WI
12/19/1957*		Butler	W 59–58	4–1	UW Fieldhouse; Madison, WI
12/27/1957*		vs. New Mexico; New Mexico Classic	W 61–59	5–1	Johnson Gymnasium; Albuquerque, NM
12/28/1957*		vs. Wyoming; New Mexico Classic	L 65–93	5–2	Johnson Gymnasium; Albuquerque, NM
12/30/1957*		at Utah	L 70–72	5–3	Nielsen Fieldhouse; Salt Lake City, UT
1/04/1958		Illinois	L 59–64	5–4 (0–1)	UW Fieldhouse; Madison, WI
1/06/1958		at Michigan	L 49–70	5–5 (0–2)	Yost Fieldhouse; Ann Arbor, MI
1/11/1958		Ohio State	W 67–64	6–5 (1–2)	UW Fieldhouse; Madison, WI
1/13/1958		at Illinois	W 71–70	7–5 (2–2)	Huff Hall; Champaign, IL
1/18/1958		at Purdue	L 47–62	7–6 (2–3)	Lambert Fieldhouse; West Lafayette, IN
1/20/1958		Michigan State	W 66–52	8–6 (3–3)	UW Fieldhouse; Madison, WI
2/08/1958		Minnesota	L 66–71	8–7 (3–4)	UW Fieldhouse; Madison, WI
2/10/1958		Indiana	L 87–93	8–8 (3–5)	UW Fieldhouse; Madison, WI
2/15/1958		Purdue	L 76–81	8–9 (3–6)	UW Fieldhouse; Madison, WI
2/17/1958		at Iowa	L 61–74	8–10 (3–7)	Iowa Field House; Iowa City, IA
2/22/1958		at Michigan State	L 59–93	8–11 (3–8)	Jenison Fieldhouse; East Lansing, MI
2/24/1958		at Minnesota	L 63–71	8–12 (3–9)	Williams Arena; Minneapolis, MN
3/01/1958		at Northwestern	L 65–82	8–13 (3–10)	Welsh-Ryan Arena; Evanston, IL
3/03/1958		Michigan	L 65–72	8–14 (3–11)	UW Fieldhouse; Madison, WI
*Non-conference game. ^{#}Rankings from AP Poll. (#) Tournament seedings in parentheses.
