= Ronald Kozlicki =

American basketball player (born 1944)

Personal information
- Born: December 12, 1944 (age 81) Chicago, Illinois
- Listed height: 6 ft 7 in (2.01 m)
- Listed weight: 215 lb (98 kg)

Career information
- High school: Palatine (Palatine, Illinois)
- College: Northwestern (1964–1967)
- NBA draft: 1967: 4th round, 41st overall pick
- Drafted by: San Diego Rockets
- Position: Small forward
- Number: 42

Career history
- 1967–1968: Indiana Pacers
- Stats at Basketball Reference

Ronald F. Kozlicki (born December 12, 1944) is an American former professional basketball player. He played college basketball for the Northwestern Wildcats. Kozlicki was selected in both the 1967 NBA draft and ABA draft by the San Diego Rockets and Indiana Pacers, respectively. He chose to play in the ABA for the Pacers during the 1967–68 season and appeared in 37 games while averaging 2.9 points and 1.9 rebounds per game.

== Career statistics ==
Legend
GP	Games played	GS	Games started	MPG	Minutes per game
FG%	Field goal percentage	3P%	3-point field goal percentage	FT%	Free throw percentage
RPG	Rebounds per game	APG	Assists per game	SPG	Steals per game
BPG	Blocks per game	PPG	Points per game	**Bold**	Career high

=== ABA ===
==== Regular season ====
Year	Team	GP	MPG	FG%	3P%	FT%	RPG	APG	PPG
1967–68	Indiana	37	9.6	.339	.207	.618	1.9	.4	2.9

==== Playoffs ====
Year	Team	GP	MPG	FG%	3P%	FT%	RPG	APG	PPG
1968	Indiana	2	2.5	.000	.000	–	.5	.0	.0
