= 1957–58 Illinois Fighting Illini men's basketball team =

American college basketball season

1957–58 Illinois Fighting Illini men's basketball
- Conference: Big Ten Conference
- Record: 11–11 (5-9 Big Ten)
- Head coach: Harry Combes (11th season)
- Assistant coaches: Howie Braun (21st season); Jim Bredar (2nd season); Jess MacLeay (2nd season)
- MVP: Don Ohl
- Captain: John Paul
- Home arena: Huff Hall

1957–58 Big Ten Conference men's basketball standings
	Conf.				Overall
Team	W		L	PCT	W		L	PCT
No. 12 Indiana	10	–	4	.714	13	–	11	.542
No. 17 Michigan State	9	–	5	.643	16	–	6	.727
Purdue	9	–	5	.643	14	–	8	.636
Northwestern	8	–	6	.571	13	–	9	.591
Ohio State	8	–	6	.571	9	–	13	.409
Iowa	7	–	7	.500	13	–	9	.591
Michigan	6	–	8	.429	11	–	11	.500
Illinois	5	–	9	.357	11	–	11	.500
Minnesota	5	–	9	.357	9	–	12	.429
Wisconsin	3	–	11	.214	8	–	14	.364
Rankings from AP Poll

The 1957–58 Illinois Fighting Illini men’s basketball team represented the University of Illinois.

== Regular season ==
Starting his second decade as the head coach of the University of Illinois' Fighting Illini basketball team, Harry Combes and his assistant coach and top recruiter, Howie Braun, were beginning to lose some of the top recruits from the state of Illinois. Talented players, such as Tom Hawkins, Charlie Brown, McKinley "Deacon" Davis, Nolden Gentry, John Tidwell and Charles "Chico" Vaughn were lured away to play for other programs during the late 1950s, a trend that would continue for Combes during his second decade.

The 1957-58 team returned several lettermen including the leading scorer Don Ohl and team "captain" John Paul. It also saw the return of Roger Taylor and Ted Caiazza. The team also added sophomores Govoner Vaughn, Mannie Jackson, Al Gosnell, Bruce Bunkenberg and Ed Perry. The Illini finished the season with a conference record of 5 wins and 9 losses, finishing in 8th place in the Big Ten. They would finish with an overall record of 11 wins and 11 losses. The starting lineup included Govoner Vaughn at the center position, Roger Taylor and Don Ohl at guard and Mannie Jackson and John Paul at the forward slots.

=== Roster ===
1957–58 Illinois Fighting Illini men's basketball team
Players
Coaches

Pos.	#	Name	Height	Weight	Year	Previous school	Hometown
G	7	Lee Frandsen	6 ft 3 in (1.91 m)	155 lb (70 kg)	So	Davenport Central High School	Davenport, Iowa
G	9	Jerry Riva	5 ft 11 in (1.8 m)	175 lb (79 kg)	So	Clinton High School	Clinton, Illinois
G	11	Roger Taylor	6 ft 0 in (1.83 m)	170 lb (77 kg)	Jr	Rich High School	Park Forest, Illinois
G	14	Jim Dorris	6 ft 1 in (1.85 m)	180 lb (82 kg)	So	Centralia High School	Centralia, Illinois
F	15	Bob Schmidt	6 ft 5 in (1.96 m)	180 lb (82 kg)	So	Kankakee High School	Kankakee, Illinois
G	16	Phil Flanigan	5 ft 8 in (1.73 m)	150 lb (68 kg)	Jr	Tuscola High School	Tuscola, Illinois
F	20	Bruce Bunkenburg	6 ft 3 in (1.91 m)	180 lb (82 kg)	So	Roosevelt High School	Chicago, Illinois
C	22	Ed Perry	6 ft 5 in (1.96 m)	185 lb (84 kg)	So	Salem High School	Salem, Illinois
C	24	Ted Caiazza	6 ft 7 in (2.01 m)	235 lb (107 kg)	Sr	Lyons Township High School	LaGrange, Illinois
C	26	John Homeier	6 ft 3 in (1.91 m)	185 lb (84 kg)	So	Feitshans High School	Springfield, Illinois
G	30	Mannie Jackson	6 ft 3 in (1.91 m)	175 lb (79 kg)	So	Edwardsville High School	Edwardsville, Illinois
G	32	Lou Landt	6 ft 3 in (1.91 m)	190 lb (86 kg)	So	Roosevelt High School	Berwyn, Illinois
F	33	Al Gosnell	6 ft 4 in (1.93 m)	190 lb (86 kg)	Jr	Lawrenceville High School	Lawrenceville, Illinois
F	34	Larry Breyfogle	6 ft 3 in (1.91 m)	165 lb (75 kg)	Sr	Lawrenceville High School	Lawrenceville, Illinois
G	35	Govoner Vaughn	6 ft 3 in (1.91 m)	180 lb (82 kg)	So	Edwardsville High School	Edwardsville, Illinois
F	40	Tom Adams	6 ft 5 in (1.96 m)	185 lb (84 kg)	So	Washington Community High School	Washington, Illinois
G	43	John Paul (C)	6 ft 1 in (1.85 m)	175 lb (79 kg)	Sr	St. Edward High School	Elgin, Illinois
G	44	Don Ohl	6 ft 3 in (1.91 m)	190 lb (86 kg)	Sr	Edwardsville High School	Edwardsville, Illinois
C	48	Bob Brown	6 ft 7 in (2.01 m)	203 lb (92 kg)	Jr	DuPont High School	Wilmington, Delaware
F	51	Tom Haller	6 ft 3 in (1.91 m)	185 lb (84 kg)	Jr	Lockport Township High School	Lockport, Illinois

Head coach

- Harry Combes (University of Illinois) (11th year)

Assistant coach(es)

- Howie Braun (University of Illinois) (21st year)
- Jim Bredar (University of Illinois) (2nd year)
- Jess MacLeay (University of Illinois) (2nd year)

Legend

- (C) Team captain
- (S) Suspended
- (I) Ineligible
- (W) Walk-on
- Injured
- Current redshirt

Roster

== Schedule ==
Date time, TV	Rank^{#}	Opponent^{#}	Result	Record	Site (attendance) city, state
Non-Conference regular season
12/2/1957*		Marquette	W 100–90	1-0	Huff Hall (5,123); Champaign, IL
12/7/1957*		DePaul	W 75–70	2-0	Huff Hall (6,263); Champaign, IL
12/11/1957*		Butler	W 91–75	3-0	Huff Hall (5,809); Champaign, IL
12/16/1957*		Colorado	W 64–46	4-0	Huff Hall (6,789); Champaign, IL
12/18/1957*		No. 14 Rice	W 85–82	5-0	Huff Hall (6,847); Champaign, IL
12/21/1957*		at Iowa State	L 60–68	5-1	Iowa State Armory (-); Ames, IA
12/28/1957*		Miami (OH)	W 93–75	6-1	Huff Hall (3,902); Champaign, IL
Big Ten regular season
1/4/1958		at Wisconsin	W 64–59	7-1 (1-0)	Wisconsin Field House (4,000); Madison, WI
1/6/1958		Iowa; Rivalry	L 68–70	7-2 (1-1)	Huff Hall (5,964); Champaign, IL
1/11/1958	No. 17	at Indiana; Rivalry	L 82–89	7-3 (1-2)	The Fieldhouse (10,000); Bloomington, IN
1/13/1958	No. 17	Wisconsin	L 70–71	7-4 (1-3)	Huff Hall (6,107); Champaign, IL
1/26/1958*		vs. Notre Dame	L 67–81	7-5	Chicago Stadium (16,212); Chicago, IL
2/1/1958		Northwestern; Rivalry	W 102–98	8-5 (2-3)	Huff Hall (4,656); Champaign, IL
2/3/1958		at Ohio State	L 70–78	8-6 (2-4)	St. John Arena (8,867); Columbus, OH
2/8/1958		at Michigan	L 81–88	8-7 (2-5)	Yost Field House (8,200); Ann Arbor, MI
2/10/1958		Purdue	W 99–84	9-7 (3-5)	Huff Hall (6,017); Champaign, IL
2/15/1958		at No. 19 Michigan State	L 64–70	9-8 (3-6)	Jenison Fieldhouse (7,033); East Lansing, MI
2/17/1958		Minnesota	W 94–87	10-8 (4-6)	Huff Hall (5,210); Champaign, IL
2/22/1958		at Iowa; Rivalry	L 79–83	10-9 (4-7)	Iowa Field House (15,003); Iowa City, IA
3/1/1958		Michigan	W 88–75	11-9 (5-7)	Huff Hall (6,588); Champaign, IL
3/3/1958		Indiana; Rivalry	L 86–96	11-10 (5-8)	Huff Hall (6,757); Champaign, IL
3/8/1958		at Northwestern; Rivalry	L 72–88	11-11 (5-9)	McGaw Memorial Hall (8,629); Evanston, IL
*Non-conference game. ^{#}Rankings from AP Poll. (#) Tournament seedings in parentheses. All times are in Central Time.

== Player stats ==
Player	Games played	Field goals	Free throws	Points
Don Ohl	22	183	65	431
Govoner Vaughn	22	138	51	327
John Paul	21	106	85	297
Roger Taylor	20	97	68	262
Mannie Jackson	22	107	31	245
Al Gosnell	22	30	24	84
Bruce Bunkenburg	18	17	17	51
Ed Perry	19	7	8	22
Lee Frandsen	15	5	3	13
Lou Landt	12	3	2	8
Larry Breyfogle	6	2	2	6
Tom Haller	13	0	0	0

== Awards and honors ==
- Don Ohl
  - Converse 2nd Team All-American
  - Helms 3rd Team All-American
  - Team Most Valuable Player
- Govoner Vaughn
  - Converse Honorable Mention All-American

== Team players drafted into the NBA ==
Player	NBA club	Round	Pick
Don Ohl	Philadelphia Warriors	5	5
