= Pete Tillotson =

American former basketball player (1936–2018)

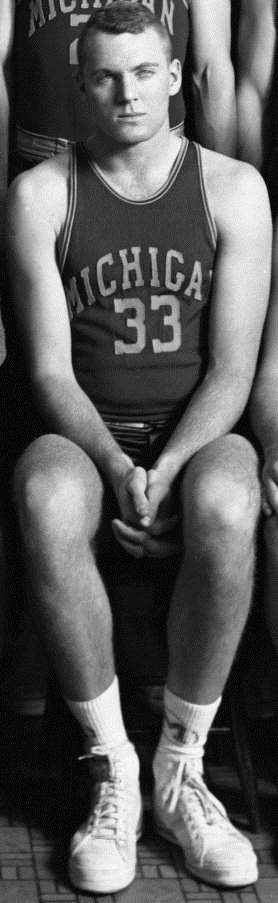

Personal information
- Born: March 23, 1936 Shelby, Michigan, U.S.
- Died: February 7, 2018 (aged 81) Hayden, Idaho, U.S.
- Listed height: 6 ft 6 in (1.98 m)

Career information
- High school: Ludington (Ludington, Michigan)
- College: Michigan (1955–1958)
- NBA draft: 1958: 7th round, 54th overall pick
- Drafted by: Syracuse Nationals
- Playing career: 1958–1962

Career highlights
- Mr. Basketball of Michigan (1954)
- Stats at Basketball Reference

Peter Sage Tillotson (March 23, 1936 – February 7, 2018) was an American basketball player. He grew up in Ludington, Michigan, and played basketball for Ludington High School from 1951 to 1954 and the University of Michigan from 1955 to 1958.

== Career ==
Tillotson was born on March 23, 1936, in Shelby, Michigan, to Ivan and Marguerite Tillotson and attended Ludington High School, playing football, basketball and tennis. In three years of Ludington High School varsity basketball, Tillotson scored 1,176 points—179 points as a sophomore, 433 points as a junior and 564 points as a senior.

During the 1953–54 season, he averaged 25.6 points per game. In 1952, Tillotson was named to the All-State team and led Ludington to a 21–2 record and a berth in the state finals. The following season, Tillotson was again named to the All-State team as he led Ludington to an 18–4 record and an appearance in the state semi-finals.

As a student at the University of Michigan, he played center for the Michigan Wolverines men's basketball team from 1955 to 1958. He was the captain, most valuable player, and leading scorer on the 1957–58 Michigan Wolverines men's basketball team. He scored 415 points during the 1957–58 season (an average of 18.8 points per game), the second highest point total in Michigan's history to that point.

Tillotson was drafted by the Syracuse Nationals in the seventh round (54th overall pick) of the 1958 NBA draft.

He was injured during the pre-season training camp for Syracuse and spent the 1958–59 season playing for the Milan Simmenthal in the Italian Amateur League. He led Milan to a second-place finish for the European championship while averaging 18 points and 11 rebounds. He played for Syracuse in 1960 and the Holland Oilers of the Midwest Professional Basketball League in 1961–1962, but his playing career ended after he sustained a knee injury.

== Honors ==
Tillotson was named 1954 Mr. Michigan in Basketball.

Tillotson received the 1958 Chicago Tribune Big Ten Michigan Most Valuable Player Award.

In 2005, Tillotson was in the inaugural class of seven athletes inducted into the Mason County Sports Hall of Fame.

== Personal ==
After retiring from basketball, Tillotson worked for nearly 40 years for Ford Motor Company, Paine Webber, Goldman Sachs and General Electric. He retired in 2001.

Tillotson married Yvette Perkins in 1965 in Beaconsfield, Buckinghamshire, England, UK. They were divorced around 1971.

Tillotson died on February 7, 2018, at the age of 81 and was survived by his second wife, Cleta; He is also survived by his first wife Yvette Perkins who is the mother of his sons, Geoffrey and Jonathan.
