= Porter Meriwether =

American basketball player (1940–2009)

Personal information
- Born: March 16, 1940 Evansville, Indiana, U.S.
- Died: November 13, 2009 (aged 69) Chicago, Illinois, U.S.
- Listed height: 6 ft 2 in (1.88 m)
- Listed weight: 180 lb (82 kg)

Career information
- High school: Lincoln (Evansville, Indiana)
- College: Tennessee State (1958–1962)
- NBA draft: 1962: 3rd round, 21st overall pick
- Drafted by: Syracuse Nationals
- Playing career: 1962–1970
- Position: Point guard
- Number: 14

Career history
- 1962–1963: Syracuse Nationals
- 1963–1969: Chicago Bombers
- 1968–1970: New Haven Elms / Hamden Bics

Career highlights
- 3x All-North American Basketball League (1965–1967); 3x NABL scoring leader (1965–1967); NAIA champion (1959)
- Stats at NBA.com
- Stats at Basketball Reference

Porter Louis Meriwether (March 16, 1940 – November 13, 2009) was an American professional basketball player. He played in the National Basketball Association (NBA) for the Syracuse Nationals after a collegiate career at Tennessee State University. Meriwether scored 119 points in his NBA career. He was drafted by the Hawaii Chiefs of the ABL, but chose to sign with the Nationals in the more established NBA.

From 1963 to 1969, Meriwether played with the Chicago Bombers. Beginning in 1964–1965, he led the North American Basketball League in scoring for three consecutive seasons, averaging 28.1, 28.3 and 29.9 points.

Following his basketball career, he was employed by the Cook County (Illinois) Public Defender Office.

== Career statistics ==
Legend
GP	Games played	GS	Games started	MPG	Minutes per game
FG%	Field goal percentage	3P%	3-point field goal percentage	FT%	Free throw percentage
RPG	Rebounds per game	APG	Assists per game	SPG	Steals per game
BPG	Blocks per game	PPG	Points per game	**Bold**	Career high

=== NBA ===
==== Regular season ====
Year	Team	GP	MPG	FG%	FT%	RPG	APG	PPG
1962–63	Syracuse	31	8.6	.393	.697	.9	1.4	3.8
