= Nick Mantis =

American-Greek basketball player (1935–2017)

Personal information
- Born: December 7, 1935 East Chicago, Indiana, U.S.
- Died: August 13, 2017 (aged 81) Schererville, Indiana, U.S.
- Listed height: 6 ft 3 in (1.91 m)
- Listed weight: 190 lb (86 kg)

Career information
- High school: Washington (East Chicago, Indiana)
- College: Northwestern (1956–1959)
- NBA draft: 1959: 5th round, 37th overall pick
- Drafted by: St. Louis Hawks
- Playing career: 1960–1964
- Position: Shooting guard
- Number: 16, 11, 23

Career history
- 1960: Minneapolis Lakers
- 1961–1962: Kansas City Steers
- 1962: St. Louis Hawks
- 1962–1963: Chicago Zephyrs
- 1962–1964: Grand Rapids Tackers

Career highlights
- MPBL MVP (1964); All-ABL Second Team (1962)

Career NBA statistics
- Points: 236
- Rebounds: 91
- Assists: 92
- Stats at NBA.com
- Stats at Basketball Reference

Nicholas Mantis (December 7, 1935 – August 13, 2017) was an American-Greek professional basketball player.

== College career ==
After having a standout career as a high school player at East Chicago Washington High, while playing for head coach Johnny Baratto; Mantis enjoyed a stellar collegiate career at Northwestern, where he led the Wildcats in field goal percentage as a senior. That season (1958–59), he served as team captain, and led them to their best finish in the Big Ten - a tie for 2nd with an 8–6 conference record, 15–7 overall. The Wildcats won nine of their first ten games, dropping a stunner to #5 ranked North Carolina in the University of Louisville-hosted 'Bluegrass Festival Tournament.' The Wildcats spent seven consecutive weeks on the AP Poll, and knocked off the Jerry West-led West Virginia Mountaineers.

== Professional career ==
Mantis was selected in the 1959 NBA draft, by the St. Louis Hawks, after a collegiate career at Northwestern University. He played for the Hawks, Minneapolis Lakers, and Chicago Zephyrs, during a two-year NBA career. Mantis also played in the American Basketball League in the 1961–62 season, and in the Midwest Professional Basketball League, earning league MVP and first-team all-league honors, in the 1963–64 season.

== Death ==
Mantis died on August 13, 2017, at the age of 81.

== Career statistics ==
Legend
| GP | Games played | GS | Games started | MPG | Minutes per game |
| FG% | Field goal percentage | 3P% | 3-point field goal percentage | FT% | Free throw percentage |
| RPG | Rebounds per game | APG | Assists per game | SPG | Steals per game |
| BPG | Blocks per game | PPG | Points per game | **Bold** | Career high |

=== NBA ===
==== Regular season ====
| Year | Team | GP | MPG | FG% | FT% | RPG | APG | PPG |
|---|---|---|---|---|---|---|---|---|
| 1959–60 | Minneapolis | 10 | 7.1 | .256 | .500 | .6 | .9 | 2.1 |
| 1962–63 | St. Louis | 9 | 6.4 | **.400** | .333 | .7 | .8 | 2.1 |
| 1962–63 | Chicago | **33** | **19.0** | .384 | **.600** | **2.4** | **2.3** | **5.9** |
| Career | | 52 | 14.5 | .367 | .549 | 1.8 | 1.8 | 4.5 |
