= Jerry Harkness =

American basketball player (1940–2021)

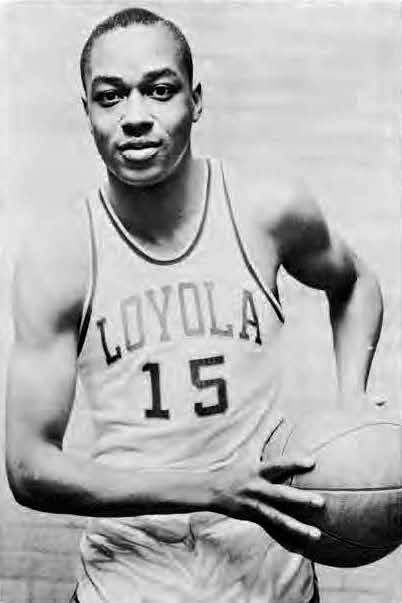
- Harkness with the Loyola Ramblers c. 1963

Personal information
- Born: May 7, 1940 Harlem, New York, U.S.
- Died: August 24, 2021 (aged 81) Indianapolis, Indiana, U.S.
- Listed height: 6 ft 2 in (1.88 m)
- Listed weight: 175 lb (79 kg)

Career information
- High school: DeWitt Clinton (Bronx, New York)
- College: Loyola Chicago (1960–1963)
- NBA draft: 1963: 2nd round, 9th overall pick
- Drafted by: New York Knicks
- Playing career: 1963–1969
- Position: Point guard
- Number: 21, 15

Career history
- 1963–1964: New York Knicks
- 1964–1967: Twin Cities Sailors
- 1967–1969: Indiana Pacers

Career highlights
- NCAA champion (1963); Consensus first-team All-American (1963); No. 15 retired by Loyola Ramblers

Career NBA and ABA statistics
- Points: 618 (7.2 ppg)
- Rebounds: 233 (2.7 rpg)
- Assists: 156 (1.8 apg)
- Stats at NBA.com
- Stats at Basketball Reference

Jerald B. Harkness (May 7, 1940 – August 24, 2021) was an American professional basketball player. He played for the New York Knicks of the National Basketball Association (NBA) and the Indiana Pacers of the American Basketball Association (ABA). Harkness played college basketball for the Loyola Ramblers, where he was captain of the 1962–63 team that won the 1963 NCAA national championship. A consensus first-team All-American, Harkness was selected by the Knicks in the second round of the 1963 NBA draft. He was also a civil rights activist.

== Early life and career ==
Harkness was born in Harlem. Before playing in the professional leagues, the 6-foot-3-inch (1.91 m) Harkness was a star at DeWitt Clinton High School and Loyola University Chicago.

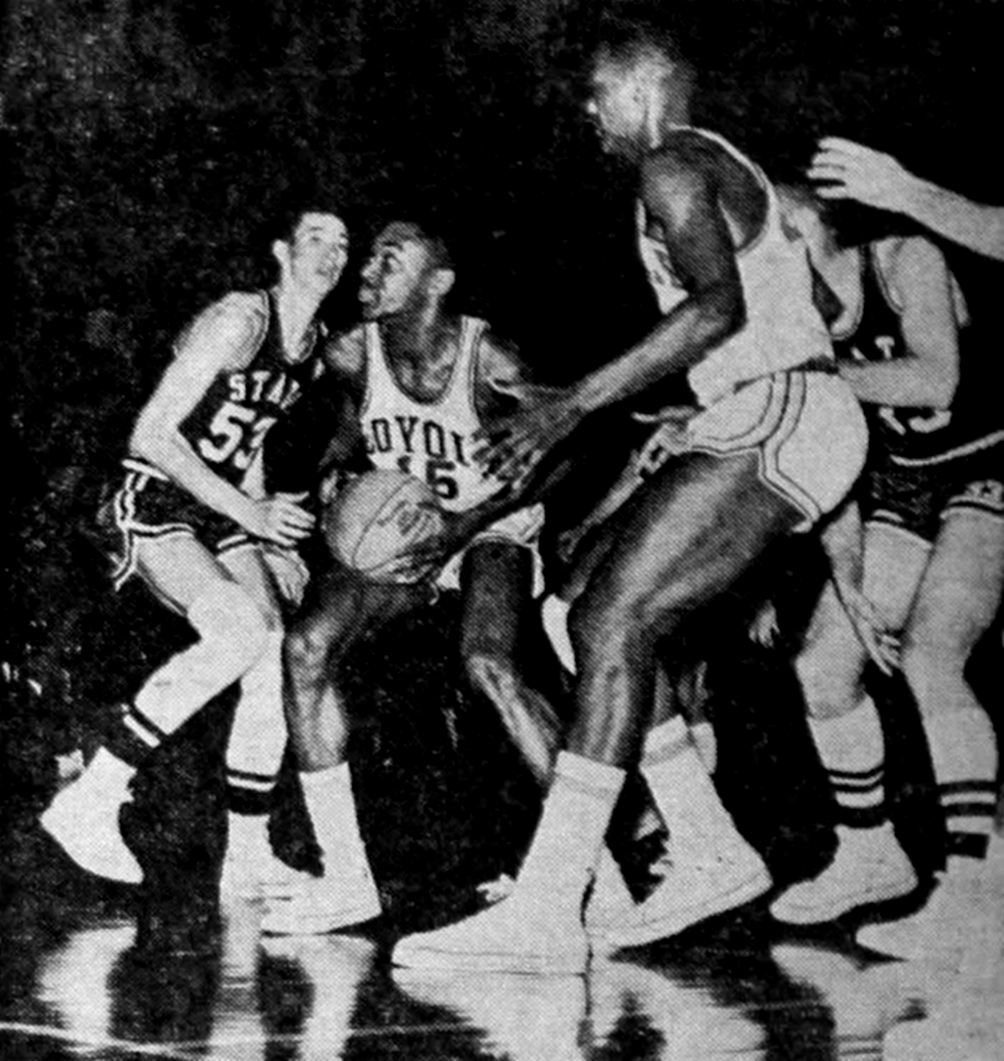
Harkness angling for a lay-up against Mississippi State in the 1963 NCAA tournament

At Loyola, he was a consensus first-team All-American and served as captain of its 1962–63 team that won the national championship. In the first round of the NCAA tournament, Loyola defeated Tennessee Tech by 111–42, which as of 2021 remains the largest margin of victory (69 points) in an NCAA tournament game. In the second round, Loyola faced Mississippi State in a historic match now known as the Game of Change. Facing Loyola's lineup with four black starters, Mississippi State defied segregationists by participating, breaking an unwritten law against Mississippi teams competing against teams with black players. Harkness was enshrined in history as he shook hands with Joe Dan Gold, the white captain of Mississippi State, prior to tip-off. In a 2013 interview, Harkness told NPR of the handshake: "The flashbulbs just went off unbelievably, and at that time, boy, I knew that this was more than just a game. This was history being made." Loyola beat Mississippi State, then sailed past Illinois and Duke to reach the tournament final. Loyola then upset the Cincinnati Bearcats in overtime to win the championship game. Harkness and the other four Loyola starters played the entire game, without substitution.

He then advanced to the pros after being drafted by the New York Knicks in the second round (10th pick overall) of the 1963 NBA draft. Harkness played one season (1963–64) with the Knicks. He spent three seasons with the Twin Cities Sailors of the NABL; in his third (and final) NABL season, he was named All-League (2nd team). The honor played a part in him securing an ABA contract with the Indiana Pacers. He then played two seasons (1967–1969) with the ABA's Indiana Pacers.

Though his professional career was relatively short, he left his mark in the record books on November 13, 1967, when he hit an 88-foot-long (27 m) game-winning buzzer beater to lead the Pacers past the Dallas Chaparrals, 119–118. (Note: The shot was taken two feet (0.61 m) in on a 94-foot (29 m) court. It was initially recorded as a 92-foot (28 m) shot, but it was later adjusted to account for the basketball rim being four feet (1.2 m) inbounds.) It was the longest shot in professional basketball until 2001, when Baron Davis hit from 89 feet (27 m) to end the third quarter. Harkness' shot remains the longest game-winning shot ever made.

== Life after basketball ==
Harkness became the first African-American salesman for Quaker Oats. In 1970, Harkness became the first African-American fundraiser in Indianapolis, working for the United Way of Greater Indianapolis. He was Indianapolis' first African-American sportscaster at WTHR (formerly WLWI) in the mid to late 1970s.

He also devoted much of his time to civil rights issues. He worked with the Southern Christian Leadership Conference in the early 1970s, and he served as executive director of the Indianapolis chapter of 100 Black Men, a national organization dedicated to supporting and training young African American males.

Harkness died in Indianapolis on August 24, 2021, at the age of 81.

== Awards and honors ==
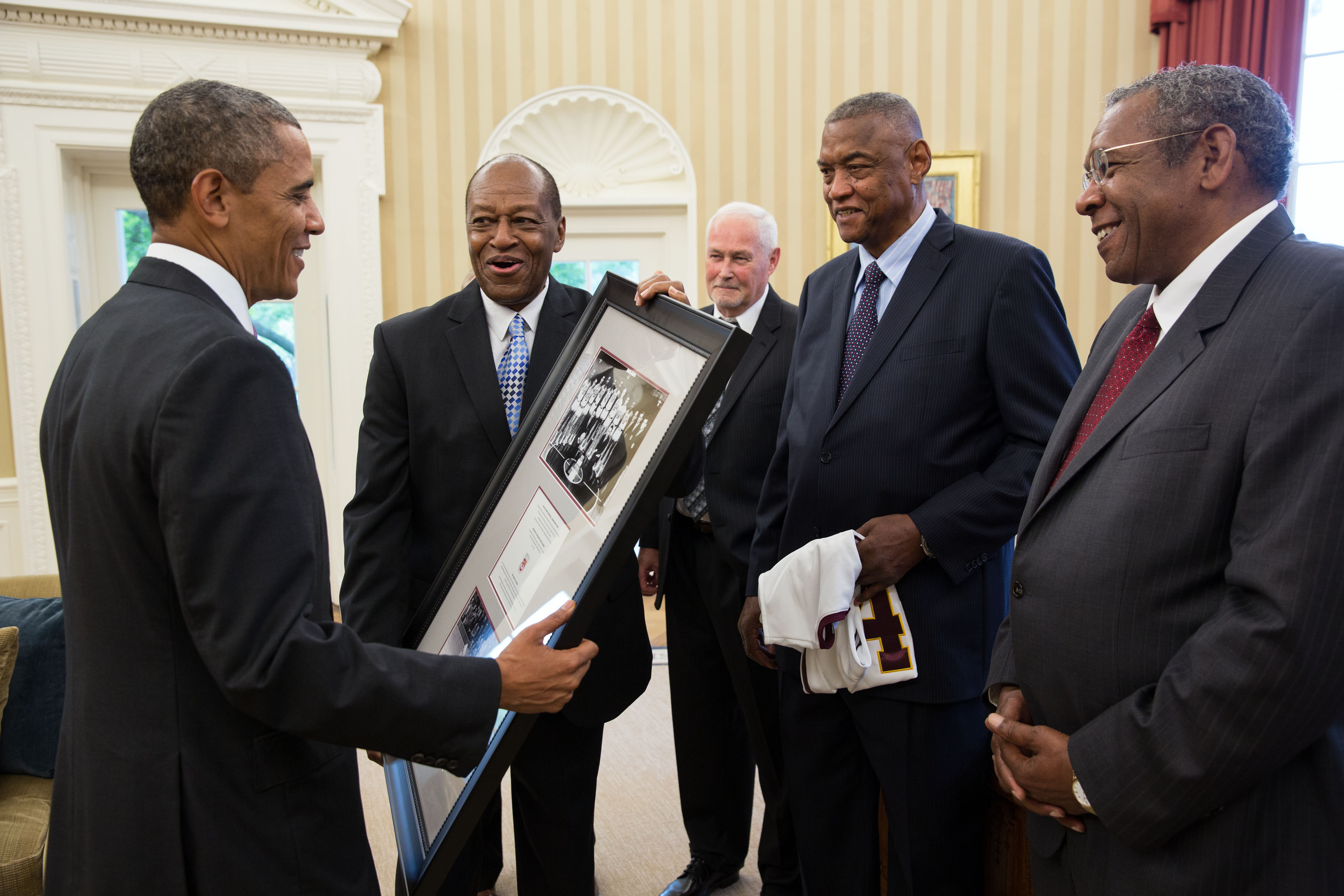
President Obama meets Harkness (second from left) and others from the 1963 Ramblers team in 2013.

On July 11, 2013, in the Oval Office of the White House, Harkness and former Loyola teammates John Egan, Les Hunter and Ron Miller met with President Barack Obama to commemorate the 50th anniversary of the school's 1963 national championship. To date it remains the only NCAA Division I basketball championship won by a university from the state of Illinois. In September 2013, Harkness and the entire 1963 Loyola Ramblers NCAA Championship basketball team was inducted into the Chicagoland Sports Hall of Fame. The 1963 Loyola Ramblers were inducted in the College Basketball Hall of Fame in November 2013.

In June 2013, Harkness was awarded the Muhammad Ali Athlete Award. He is a member of the New York City Basketball Hall of Fame and the Loyola Athletics Hall of Fame.

== Career statistics ==
Legend
GP	Games played	GS	Games started	MPG	Minutes per game
FG%	Field goal percentage	3P%	3-point field goal percentage	FT%	Free throw percentage
RPG	Rebounds per game	APG	Assists per game	SPG	Steals per game
BPG	Blocks per game	PPG	Points per game	**Bold**	Career high

=== NBA/ABA ===
==== Regular season ====
Year	Team	GP	MPG	FG%	3P%	FT%	RPG	APG	PPG
1963–64	New York	5	11.8	.433		.375	1.2	1.2	5.8
1967–68	Indiana (ABA)	**71**	17.5	.437	**.200**	**.682**	2.7	1.8	7.0
1968–69	Indiana (ABA)	10	**27.2**	**.463**	–	.638	**3.4**	**2.1**	**9.2**
Career (ABA)		81	18.7	.440	.200	.674	2.8	1.9	7.3
Career (overall)		86	18.3	.440	.200	.665	2.7	1.8	7.2

==== Playoffs ====
Year	Team	GP	MPG	FG%	3P%	FT%	RPG	APG	PPG
1968	Indiana (ABA)	3	10.7	.333	–	1.000	1.7	1.7	3.3
