= NBA high school draftees =

NBA high school draftees are players who have been drafted to the National Basketball Association (NBA) immediately out of high school. The process of moving directly from high school basketball to the professional level is also known as going prep-to-pro. Since 2006, drafting high school players has been prohibited by the NBA collective bargaining agreement, which requires that players who enter the draft be 19 years of age or older and at least one year removed from high school.

The NBA has long had a preference for players who played college basketball, and the vast majority of players who play in the NBA attended college beforehand. Out of the thousands of people who have played in the NBA, only forty-one went prep-to-pro, not including international players.

== History ==
=== Early years ===
In the early years of the NBA draft, a player had to finish his four-year college eligibility to be eligible for selection. Reggie Harding, who had graduated from high school but did not enroll in a college, became the first player drafted out of high school when the Detroit Pistons selected him in the fourth round of the 1962 draft. However, the NBA rules at that time prohibited a high school player to play in the league until one year after his high school class graduated. Thus, he spent a year playing in a minor league before he was re-drafted in the 1963 draft by the Pistons. He finally entered the league in the 1963–64 season and played four seasons in the NBA and American Basketball Association (ABA).

In 1971, the U.S. Supreme Court decision Haywood v. National Basketball Association ruled against the NBA's requirement that a player must wait four years after high school graduation (which in most cases was spent playing in college) before turning professional. This ruling allowed players to enter the NBA draft without waiting four years, provided they could give evidence of hardship to the NBA office. The NBA's rival, the ABA, had already instituted a hardship exemption in 1969.

Moses Malone was the first to play professionally directly out of high school in 1974, though with an ABA team before the merger of that association with the NBA. Two high school players, Darryl Dawkins and Bill Willoughby, applied for hardship and were declared eligible for the 1975 draft. They had applied and gave evidence of financial hardship to the league, which granted them the right to start earning a living by starting their professional careers earlier. Dawkins was selected 5th by the Philadelphia 76ers while Willoughby was selected 19th by the Atlanta Hawks. Dawkins played 14 seasons and averaged 12 points and 6 rebounds per game. Willoughby played 8 seasons with 6 different teams and averaged only 6 points per game. Neither player reached the level of success that was expected. It is argued that they could have been better players if they had college basketball experience before entering the NBA.

After Dawkins and Willoughby, no high schoolers were drafted for 14 years, though several players entered the league without playing college basketball. One player, Shawn Kemp, enrolled in college but never played any games due to personal problems. In 1989, a year after his high school graduation, he was drafted by the Seattle SuperSonics. He played 14 seasons in the NBA and was selected to 6 All-Star Games and 3 All-NBA Teams.

=== 1995–2005 ===
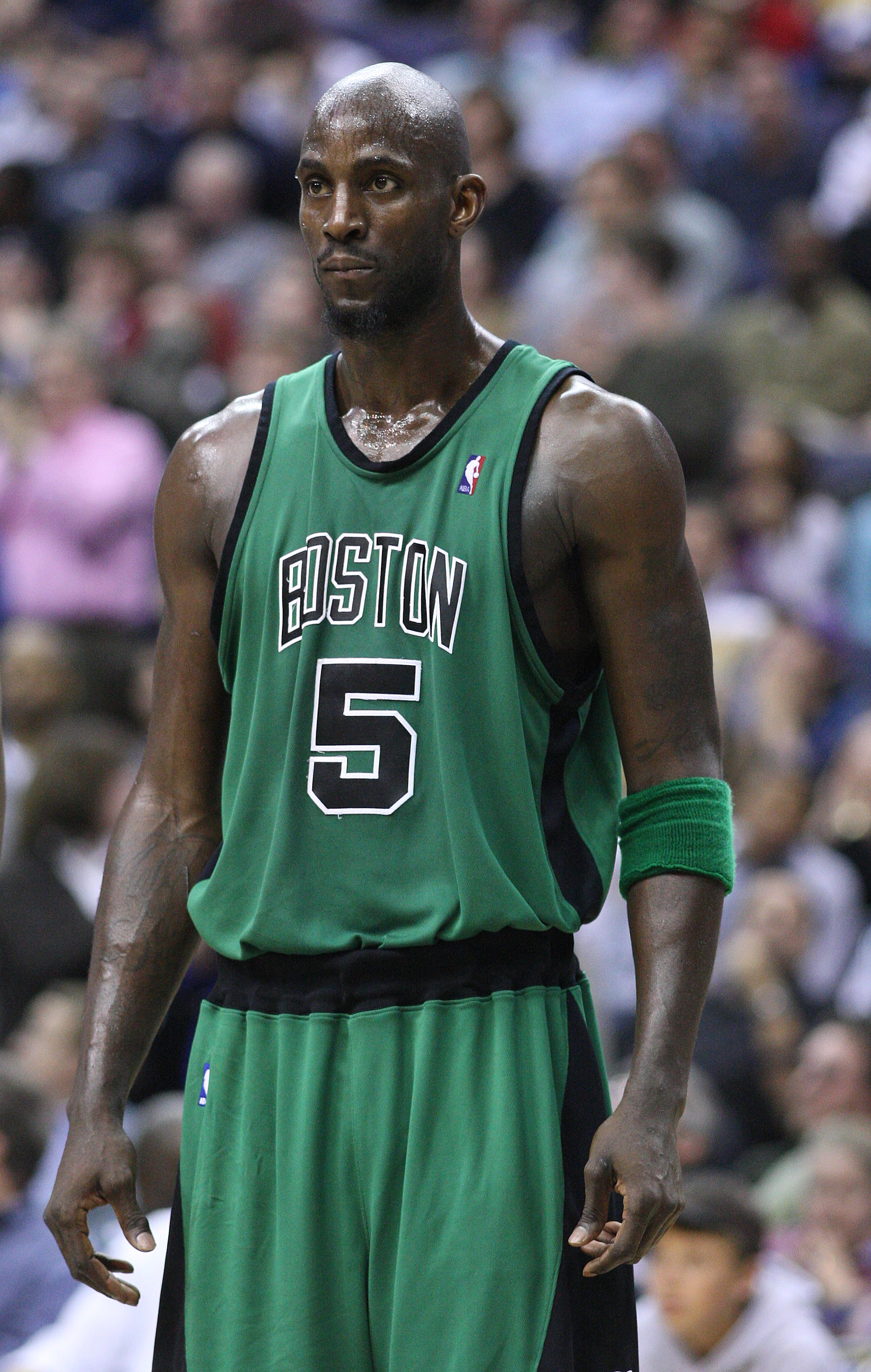
Kevin Garnett's high-profile migration from high school to the NBA in 1995 prompted many high schoolers to follow in his footsteps

In 1995, Kevin Garnett, USA Today's high school basketball player of the year, announced his intentions to forgo college, and declared himself eligible for the 1995 NBA draft. The move was highly controversial; the conventional wisdom at the time was that high-schoolers were neither emotionally nor physically mature enough for the rigors of the NBA game. On draft day, Garnett was selected with the #5 pick in the first round by the Minnesota Timberwolves. Garnett led the Timberwolves to eight consecutive playoff berths and made 10 All-Star teams in his 12 years with the team. In 2004, the Wolves advanced to the Western Conference Finals before losing to the Lakers; Garnett was named Most Valuable Player that year. After a trade in the 2007 offseason to the Boston Celtics, he was a core player in the Celtics' first NBA title in over 20 years.

In 1996, two notable players made the jump from high school to the NBA. The first was Kobe Bryant, selected by the Charlotte Hornets with the 13th pick of the NBA draft, but traded almost immediately to the Los Angeles Lakers. The second was Jermaine O'Neal, selected by the Portland Trail Blazers with the 17th pick. O'Neal was traded in 2000 to the Indiana Pacers (and later to the Miami Heat). In 1997, another All-Star caliber player, Tracy McGrady, was selected by the Toronto Raptors. In 1998, three high-schoolers were drafted with Al Harrington and Rashard Lewis experiencing the most success. Darius Miles was selected third overall in the 2000 NBA draft, the highest pick ever used on a high school player, until the following year when Kwame Brown was selected first overall. Further into the 2000s, draftees out of high school who would see success in the NBA included Tyson Chandler in 2001, Amar'e Stoudemire in 2002, LeBron James and Kendrick Perkins in 2003, Dwight Howard and Shaun Livingston in 2004, and Andrew Bynum in 2005.

=== 2005–present ===
In 2005, both the NBA and the players' union started to discuss the possibility of implementing a new age requirement. The league lobbied for an age minimum of 20 while the union was against an age requirement. Finally in July 2005, both sides compromised in the new collective bargaining agreement, requiring that the minimum age for entry into the NBA be 19 (by the end of the calendar year) and that entrants be at least one year removed from high school.

Some players support the new age limit. Gerald Green called it "a smart move", saying that "[not everybody is] LeBron James ... He came in ready and he dominated the league. There's a lot of players that have to get developed. Me, I've got to get developed. But I guess that age limit, that one year of college experience, can get you more developed and I think that's pretty good." Others, however, strongly criticize the rule. Andrew Bynum said "That's something I'll never understand. Because in no other business can the owner, or a stock trader, or a CEO of a company try to protect themselves by putting rules like that." Former Florida Gators and current Chicago Bulls head coach Billy Donovan believed that the rule made high schoolers feel like they were being punished. Spencer Haywood, the plaintiff in the Haywood v. National Basketball Association decision, supported an age limit of 20, allowing players time to mature. He left college after his sophomore season to play in the ABA.

== List ==
There have been 41 high school draftees in the NBA draft. Three draftees were selected first overall: Kwame Brown in the 2001 NBA draft, LeBron James in 2003, and Dwight Howard in the 2004 NBA draft. Two draftees went on to win the Rookie of the Year Award in their first season: LeBron James and 2002 draftee Amar'e Stoudemire. Three draftees went on to win the Most Valuable Player Award: Kevin Garnett in 2004, Kobe Bryant in 2008, and LeBron James in 2009, 2010, 2012, and 2013. Ten draftees have been selected to the All-Star Game and ten draftees have been selected to the All-NBA Team.

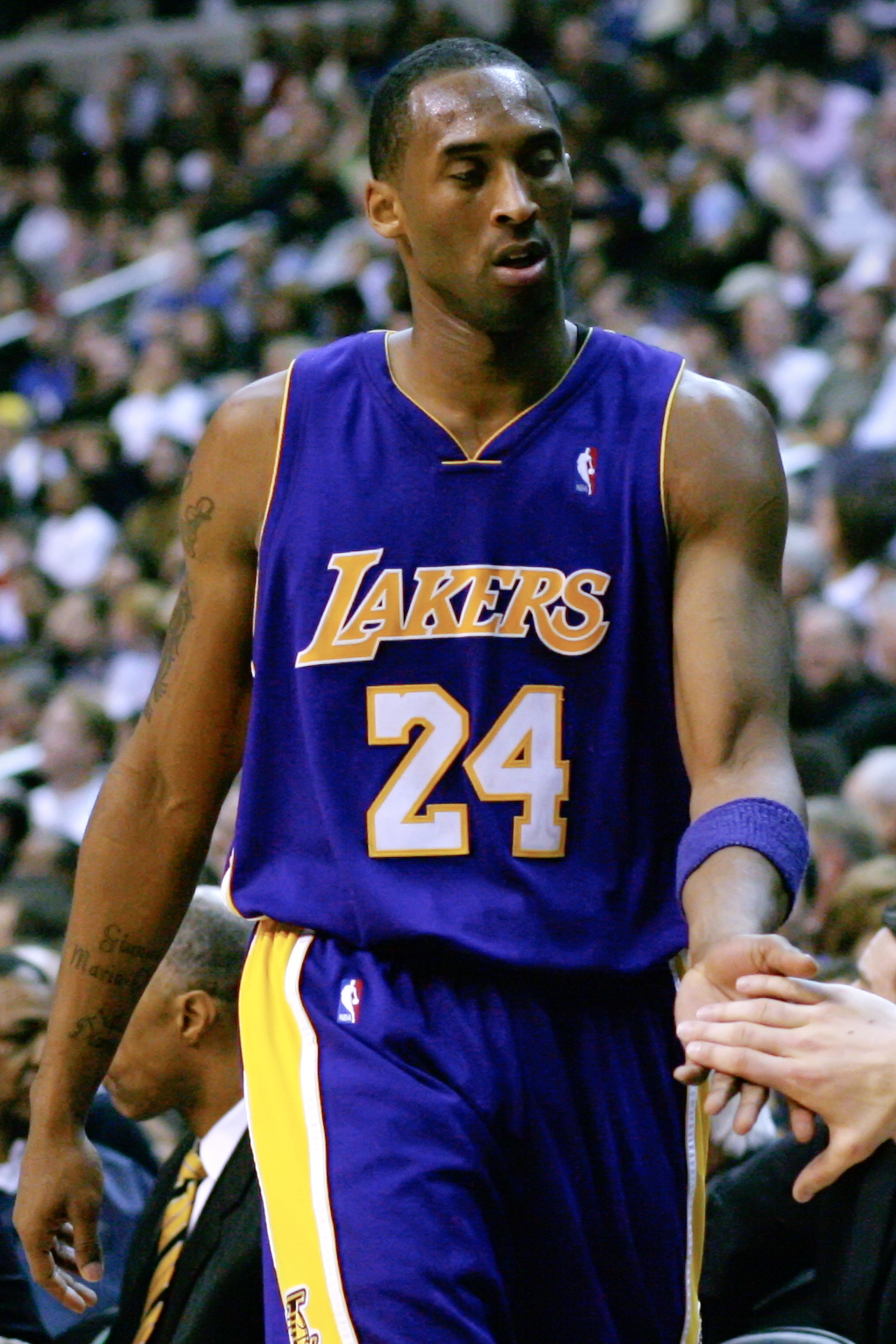
Kobe Bryant was selected by the Charlotte Hornets in 1996.

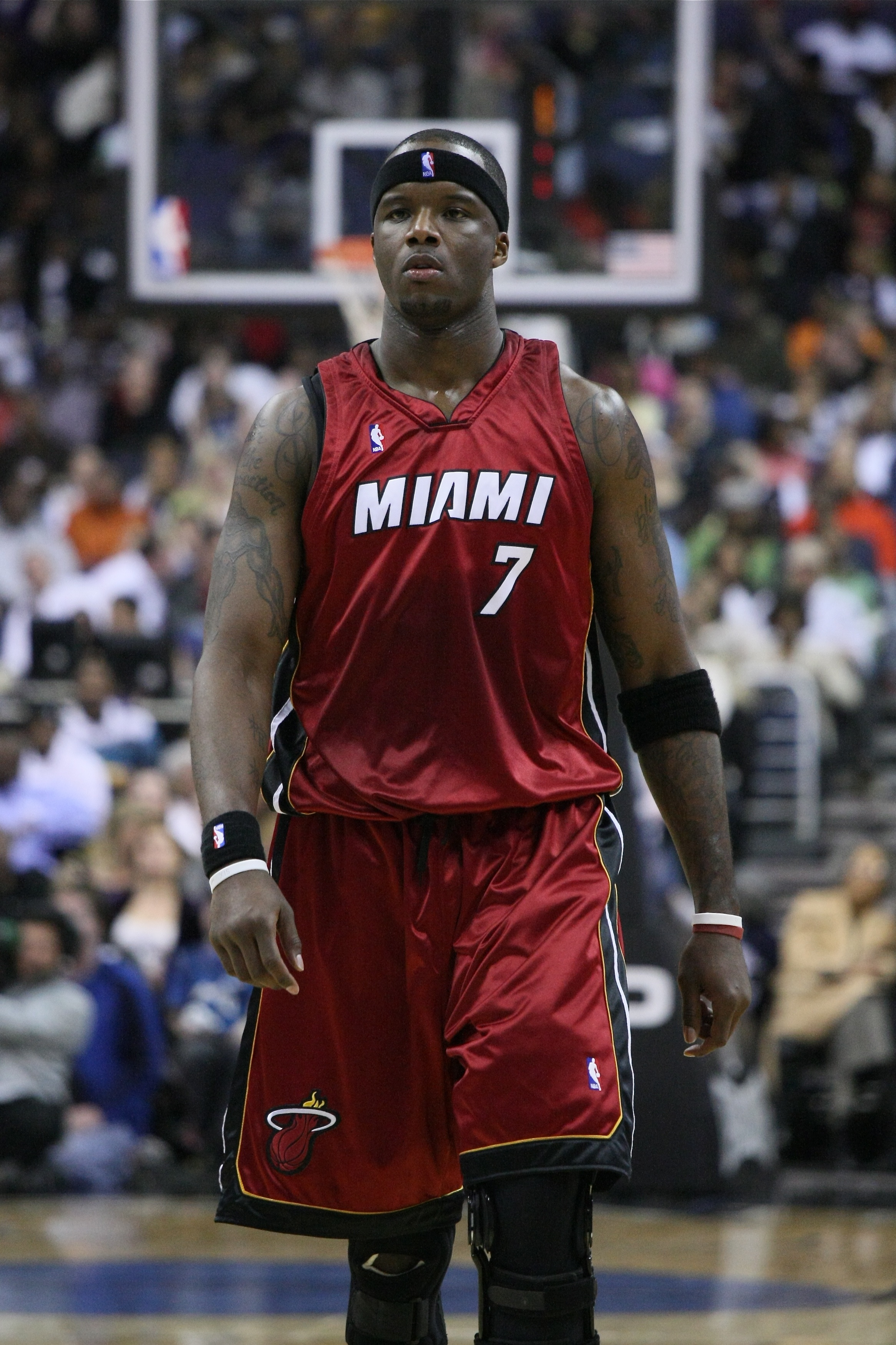
Jermaine O'Neal was selected by the Portland Trail Blazers in 1996.

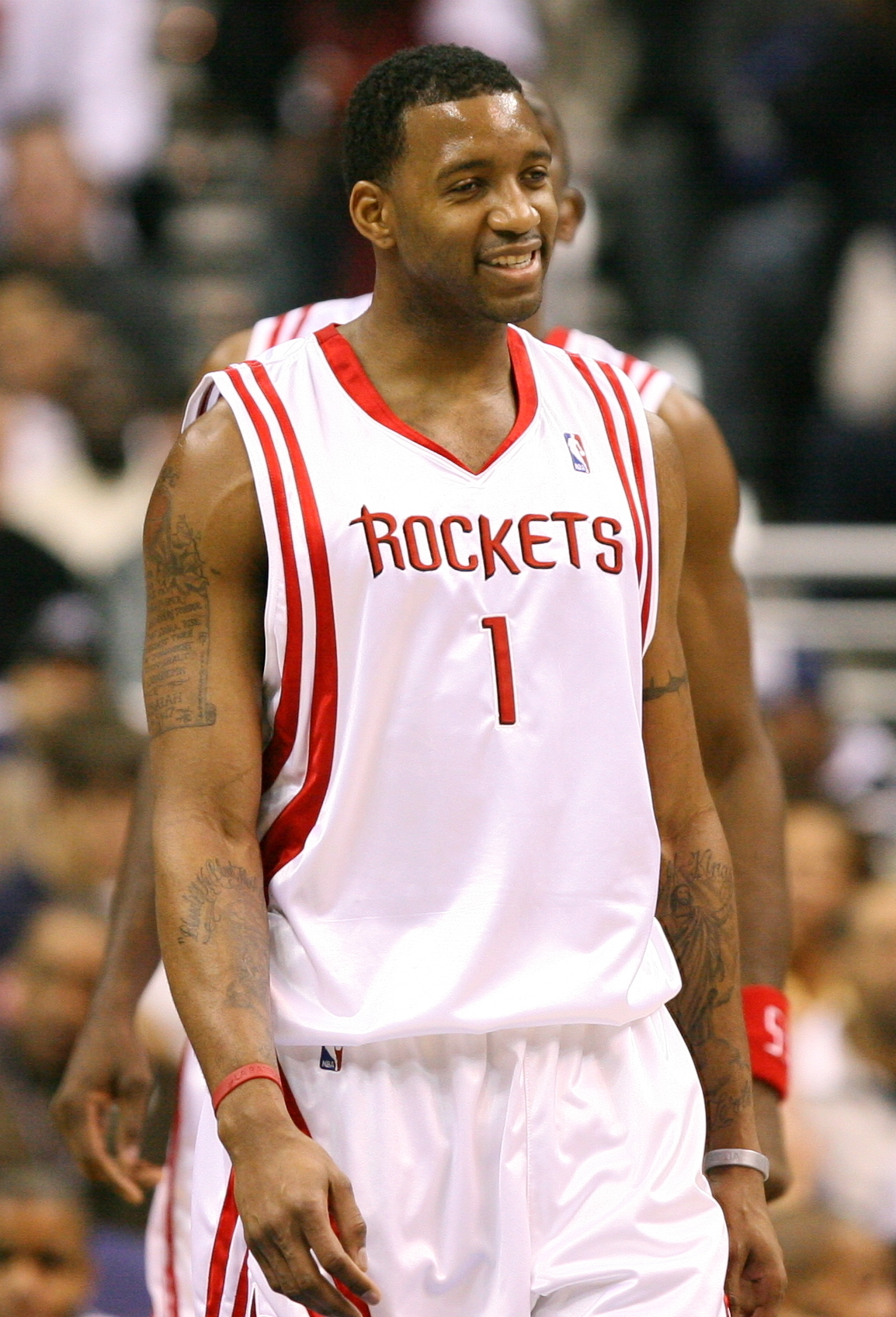
Tracy McGrady was selected by the Toronto Raptors in 1997.

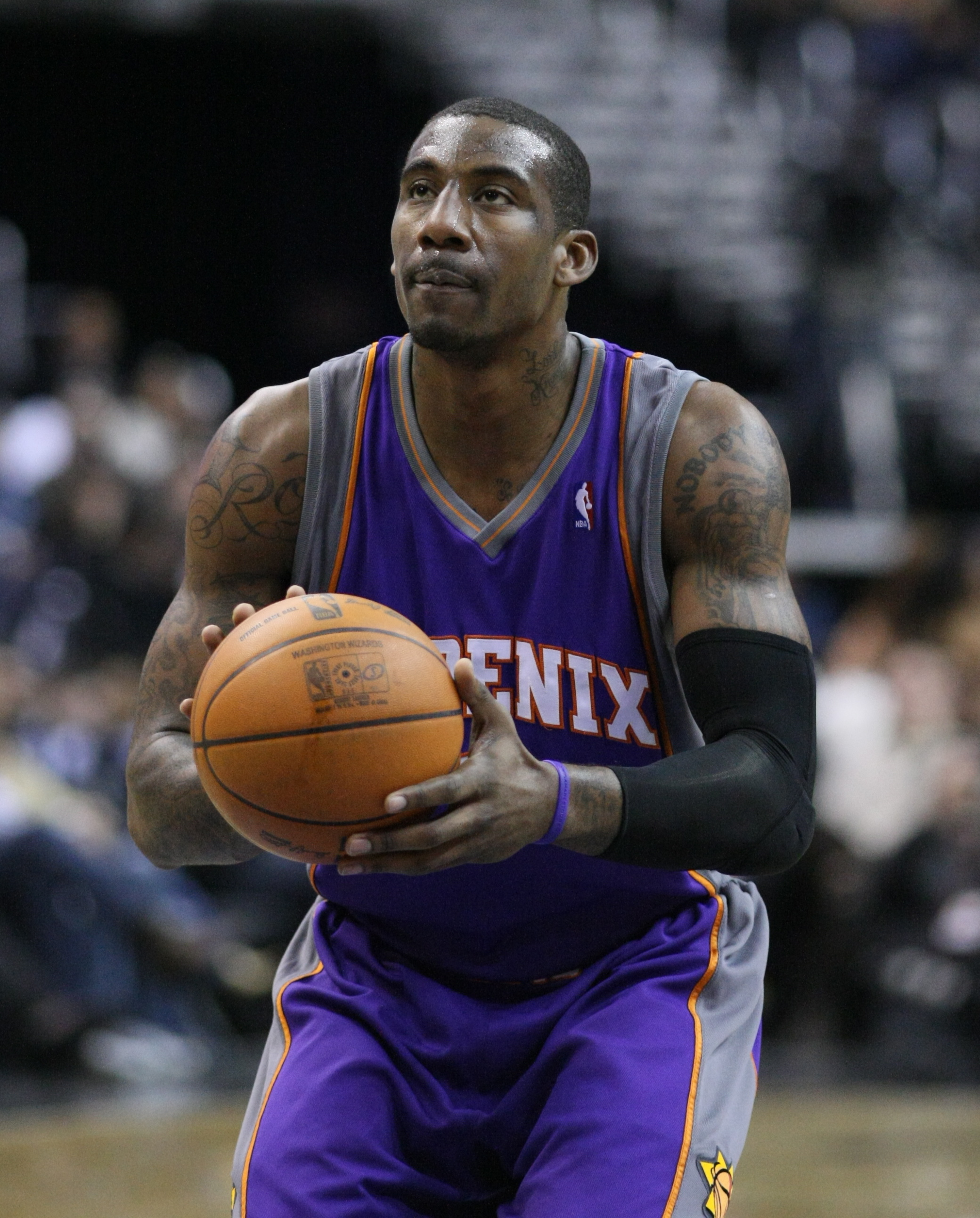
Amar'e Stoudemire was selected by the Phoenix Suns in 2002.

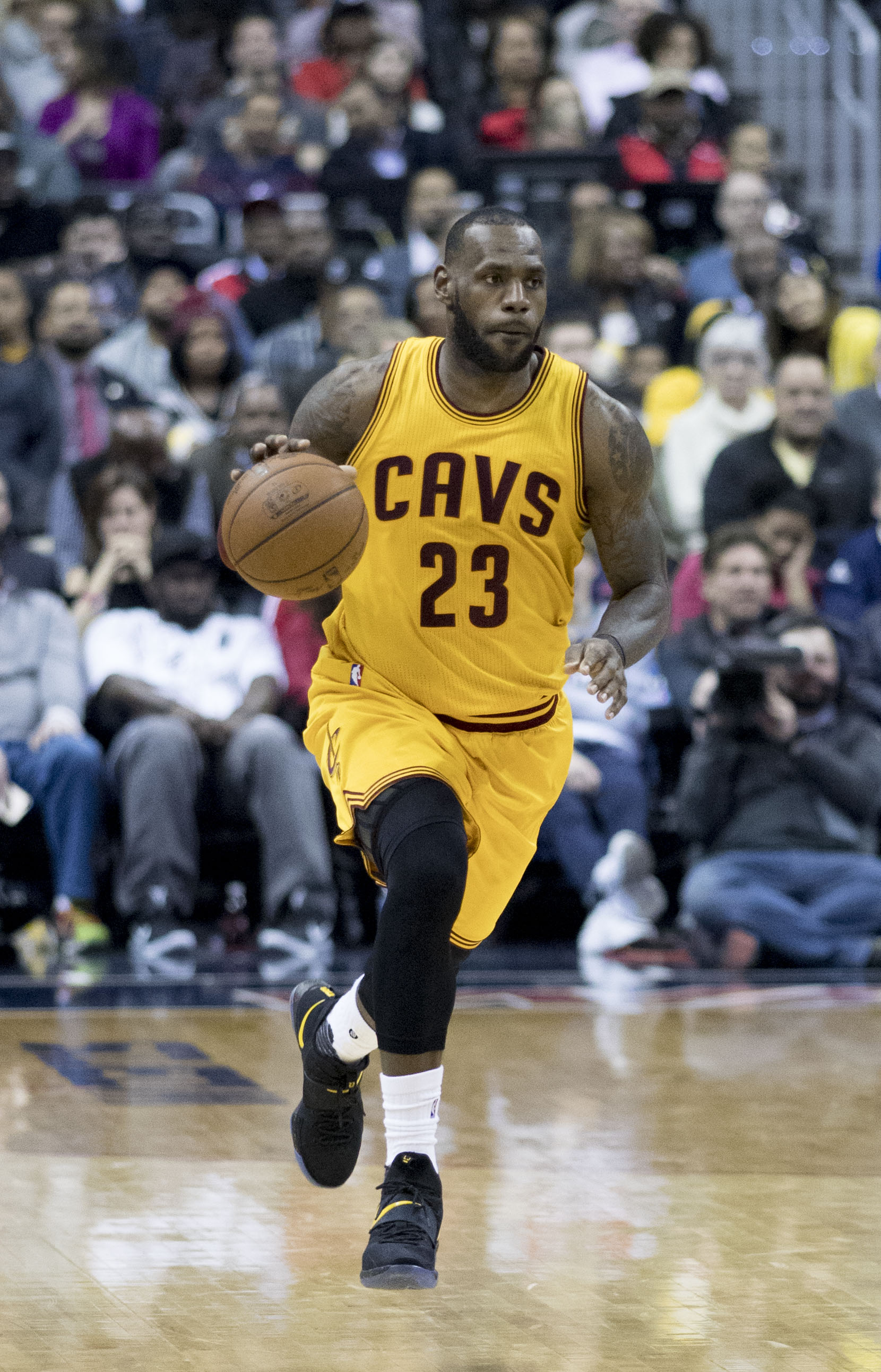
LeBron James was selected by the Cleveland Cavaliers in 2003.

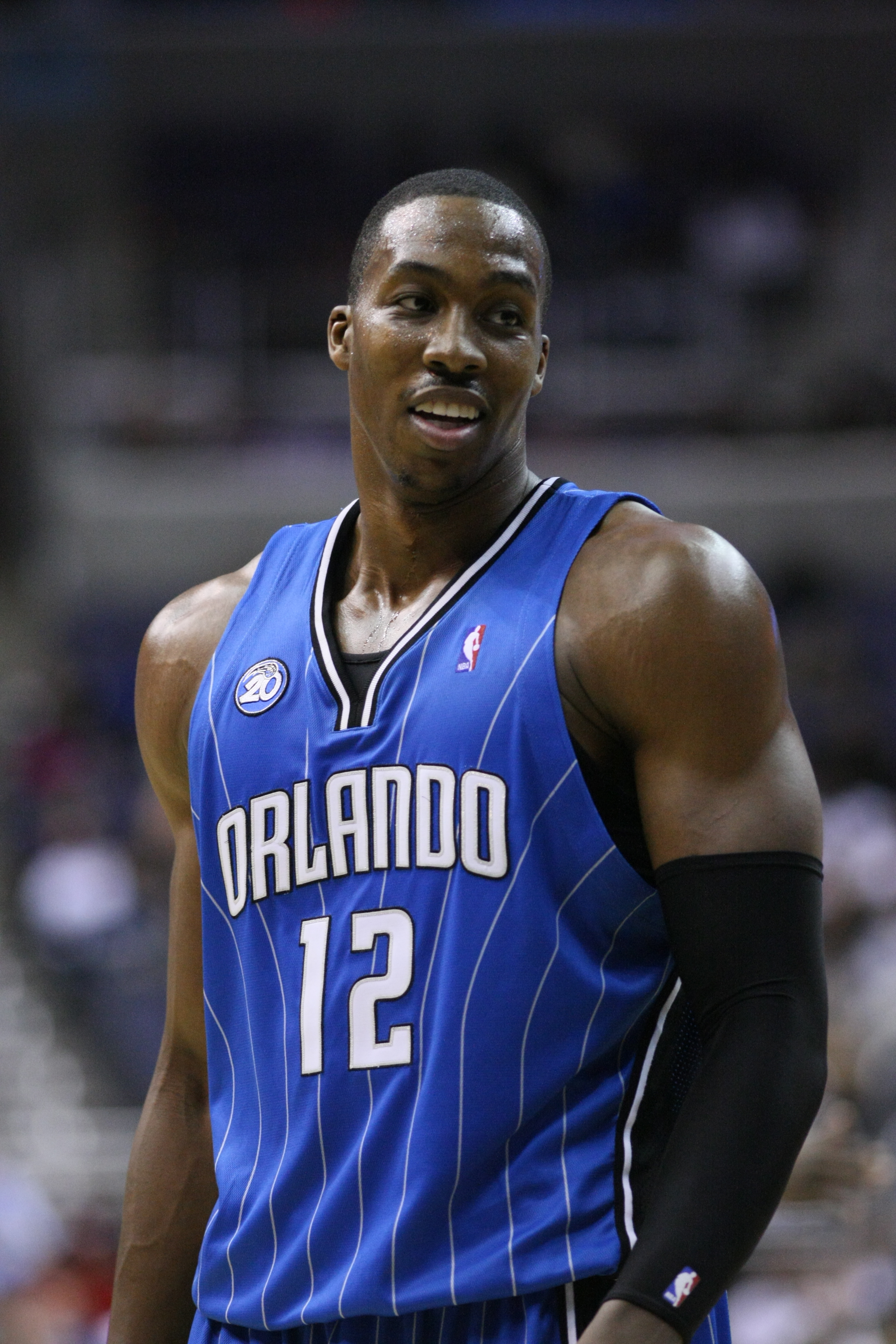
Dwight Howard was selected by the Orlando Magic in 2004.

Pos.	G	F	C
Position	Guard	Forward	Center

^	Denotes player who has been inducted to the Naismith Memorial Basketball Hall of Fame
*	Denotes player who has been selected for at least one All-Star Game and All-NBA Team
^{+}	Denotes player who has been selected for at least one All-Star Game
^{x}	Denotes player who has been selected for at least one All-NBA Team
^{#}	Denotes player who has never appeared in an NBA regular-season or playoff game

Draft^{[a]}	Round	Pick	Player	Pos.	Nationality	Draft team	High school (city)	Ref.
1975	1	5	Darryl Dawkins	C	United States	Philadelphia 76ers	Maynard Evans High School (Orlando, Florida)	
1975	2	19	Bill Willoughby	F	United States	Atlanta Hawks	Dwight Morrow High School (Englewood, New Jersey)	
1995	1	5	Kevin Garnett^	F	United States	Minnesota Timberwolves	Farragut Career Academy (Chicago, Illinois)	
1996	1	13	Kobe Bryant^	G	United States	Charlotte Hornets	Lower Merion High School (Ardmore, Pennsylvania)	
1996	1	17	Jermaine O'Neal*	F/C	United States	Portland Trail Blazers	Eau Claire High School (Columbia, South Carolina)	
1997	1	9	Tracy McGrady^	F	United States	Toronto Raptors	Mount Zion Christian Academy (Durham, North Carolina)	
1998	1	25	Al Harrington	F	United States	Indiana Pacers	St. Patrick High School (Elizabeth, New Jersey)	
1998	2	32	Rashard Lewis^{+}	F	United States	Seattle SuperSonics	Alief Elsik High School (Houston, Texas)	
1998	2	40	Korleone Young	F	United States	Detroit Pistons	Hargrave Military Academy (Chatham, Virginia)	
1999	1	5	Jonathan Bender	F	United States	Toronto Raptors	Picayune Memorial High School (Picayune, Mississippi)	
1999	1	29	Leon Smith	C	United States	San Antonio Spurs	Martin Luther King High School (Chicago, Illinois)	
2000	1	3	Darius Miles	F	United States	Los Angeles Clippers	East St. Louis High School (East St. Louis, Illinois)	
2000	1	23	DeShawn Stevenson	G	United States	Utah Jazz	Washington Union High School (Fresno, California)	
2001	1	1	Kwame Brown	F	United States	Washington Wizards	Glynn Academy (Brunswick, Georgia)	
2001	1	2	Tyson Chandler*	C	United States	Los Angeles Clippers	Dominguez High School (Compton, California)	
2001	1	4	Eddy Curry	C	United States	Chicago Bulls	Thornwood High School (South Holland, Illinois)	
2001	1	8	DeSagana Diop	C	Senegal	Cleveland Cavaliers	Oak Hill Academy (Mouth of Wilson, Virginia)	
2001	2	46	Ousmane Cisse^{#}	F	Mali	Denver Nuggets	St. Jude High School (Montgomery, Alabama)	
2002	1	9	Amar'e Stoudemire^	F/C	United States	Phoenix Suns	Cypress Creek High School (Orlando, Florida)	
2003	1	1	LeBron James*	F	United States	Cleveland Cavaliers	St. Vincent–St. Mary High School (Akron, Ohio)	
2003	1	23	Travis Outlaw	F	United States	Portland Trail Blazers	Starkville High School (Starkville, Mississippi)	
2003	1	26	Ndudi Ebi	F	United Kingdom; Nigeria	Minnesota Timberwolves	Westbury Christian School (Houston, Texas)	
2003	1	27	Kendrick Perkins	C	United States	Memphis Grizzlies	Clifton J. Ozen High School (Beaumont, Texas)	
2003	2	48	James Lang	C	United States	New Orleans Hornets	Central Park Christian High School (Birmingham, Alabama)	
2004	1	1	Dwight Howard^	F/C	United States	Orlando Magic	Southwest Atlanta Christian Academy (Atlanta, Georgia)	
2004	1	4	Shaun Livingston	G	United States	Los Angeles Clippers	Peoria High School (Peoria, Illinois)	
2004	1	12	Robert Swift	C	United States	Seattle SuperSonics	Bakersfield High School (Bakersfield, California)	
2004	1	13	Sebastian Telfair	G	United States	Portland Trail Blazers	Abraham Lincoln High School (Brooklyn, New York)	
2004	1	15	Al Jefferson×	F	United States	Boston Celtics	Prentiss High School (Prentiss, Mississippi)	
2004	1	17	Josh Smith	F	United States	Atlanta Hawks	Oak Hill Academy (Mouth of Wilson, Virginia)	
2004	1	18	J. R. Smith	G	United States	New Orleans Hornets	Saint Benedict's Preparatory School (Newark, New Jersey)	
2004	1	19	Dorell Wright	G/F	United States	Miami Heat	South Kent Preparatory School (South Kent, Connecticut)	
2005	1	6	Martell Webster	G/F	United States	Portland Trail Blazers	Seattle Preparatory School (Seattle, Washington)	
2005	1	10	Andrew Bynum^{*}	C	United States	Los Angeles Lakers	St. Joseph High School (Metuchen, New Jersey)	
2005	1	18	Gerald Green	F	United States	Boston Celtics	Gulf Shores Academy (Houston, Texas)	
2005	2	34	C. J. Miles	G	United States	Utah Jazz	Skyline High School (Dallas, Texas)	
2005	2	35	Ricky Sánchez^{#}	F	Puerto Rico	Portland Trail Blazers	IMG Academy (Bradenton, Florida)	
2005	2	40	Monta Ellis	G	United States	Golden State Warriors	Lanier High School (Jackson, Mississippi)	
2005	2	45	Louis Williams	G	United States	Philadelphia 76ers	South Gwinnett High School (Snellville, Georgia)	
2005	2	49	Andray Blatche	F	United States; Philippines	Washington Wizards	South Kent Preparatory School (South Kent, Connecticut)	
2005	2	56	Amir Johnson	F	United States	Detroit Pistons	Westchester High School (Los Angeles, California)	

1: While Ndudi Ebi was originally born and raised in London, England, he also holds Nigerian nationality due to his parents being born and raised there.
2: Andray Blatche was born and raised in Syracuse, New York and holds American nationality, but he had become a naturalized Filipino since June 2014 and has officially represented the Philippines since.

== Controversy ==
Despite the success of some high school players drafted, the entry of high school players into the NBA remains controversial. Critics say that high school players are not mentally and physically mature or prepared enough to handle the pressure of professional play; thus, they are less likely to develop properly and reach their potential. Instead, they believe that colleges are useful at filtering out players who can dominate against weak competition in high school, but cannot succeed at a higher level of play. They also think that the influx of high schoolers bypassing colleges in favor of the NBA caused collegiate play to deteriorate. Universities are wary of spending time recruiting, as many players are financially motivated to turn pro fresh out of high school.

On the other hand, proponents argue that there is no valid reason to exclude high school players. Michael McCann, writer of law article "Illegal Defense: The Irrational Economics of Banning High School Players from the NBA Draft", contends that players drafted straight out of high school can do as well as any other players in the NBA. The article finds that "on average, these [high school] players perform better in every major statistical category than does the average NBA player". Others instead believe that the problem was due to the lack of established farm system in basketball until recently. In other major sports, such as baseball and hockey, it is common for young players to develop in their minor league systems.

Discourses on the validity of high-school players entering the NBA directly, bypassing college, have also been impacted by the recent legalization of name, image and likeness deals by the NCAA, which allow collegiate athletes to profit from sponsorship deals. This has effectively reduced the financial incentives that basketball players have to move directly to the NBA from high school by allowing colleges and their boosters to compensate players. In addition, it has decreased some players' propensity to enter the NBA as soon as possible after playing one year in college, leading to them staying in school for multiple years to capitalize on NIL deals they make money from. This trend is especially noticeable in players who do not project as well to the NBA but are collegiate stars, such as Drew Timme of Gonzaga, who stated that his NIL earnings were comparable to the NBA two-way contract he was likely to sign once he turned professional (Timme eventually signed a multi-year deal with the Brooklyn Nets on March 28, 2025, following two years playing in the NBA G League for multiple teams).

== See also ==
- Eligibility for the NBA draft

== Notes ==
- ^{a} Each year is linked to an article about that particular NBA Draft.
- ^{b} Year denotes the year when the player graduated from high school.
- ^{c} Debut denotes the year when the player made his NBA debut. Each year is linked to an article about that particular NBA season.
- ^{d} Information not available
