= Jimmy Rayl =

American basketball player (1941–2019)

Personal information
- Born: June 21, 1941 Kokomo, Indiana, U.S.
- Died: January 20, 2019 (aged 77) Kokomo, Indiana, U.S.
- Listed height: 6 ft 2 in (1.88 m)
- Listed weight: 175 lb (79 kg)

Career information
- High school: Kokomo (Kokomo, Indiana)
- College: Indiana (1960–1963)
- NBA draft: 1963: 3rd round, 22nd overall pick
- Drafted by: Cincinnati Royals
- Position: Point guard
- Number: 23

Career history
- 1967–1969: Indiana Pacers

Career highlights
- 2× Third-team All-American – AP (1962, 1963); Third-team All-American – UPI (1962); 2× First-team All-Big Ten (1962, 1963); Fourth-team Parade All-American (1959); Indiana Mr. Basketball (1959)
- Stats at Basketball Reference

James R. Rayl (June 21, 1941 – January 20, 2019) was an American professional basketball player in the American Basketball Association (ABA). A 6'2" and 175 lb point guard, Rayl played on the first two teams of the Indiana Pacers from 1967 to 1969.

== High school career ==
Born in Kokomo, Indiana, Rayl went to Kokomo High School from 1956 to 1959. He was named 1959's Indiana Mr. Basketball and the recipient of the Trester Award for the state of Indiana his senior year.

== College career ==
Rayl attended Indiana University from 1959 to 1963, where he was an All-American his junior and senior seasons. Rayl averaged 20.6 ppg for his career and still holds the IU Hoosiers single-game scoring record of 56 points, which he did twice against Michigan State and Minnesota. He shot 41.6 percent from the floor and 83.5 percent from the line in 68 games as a Hoosier.

== Professional career ==
Jimmy Rayl was selected by the Cincinnati Royals in the third round and 23rd pick of the 1963 NBA draft. He later signed and played two seasons for the Indiana Pacers. He held a career average of 11.1 ppg.

== Personal life and death ==
His grandson, Jace, is a guard for the Purdue Boilermakers. Rayl died at his home in Kokomo on January 20, 2019, at age 77.

== Career statistics ==
Legend
GP	Games played	GS	Games started	MPG	Minutes per game
FG%	Field goal percentage	3P%	3-point field goal percentage	FT%	Free throw percentage
RPG	Rebounds per game	APG	Assists per game	SPG	Steals per game
BPG	Blocks per game	PPG	Points per game	**Bold**	Career high

=== ABA ===
==== Regular season ====
Year	Team	GP	MPG	FG%	3P%	FT%	RPG	APG	PPG
1967–68	Indiana	**74**	**29.6**	**.387**	.326	.802	**3.2**	**2.8**	**12.0**
1968–69	Indiana	27	21.0	.356	**.370**	**.897**	2.5	2.3	8.9
Career		101	27.3	.381	.341	.823	3.0	2.7	11.1

==== Playoffs ====
Year	Team	GP	MPG	FG%	3P%	FT%	RPG	APG	PPG
1968	Indiana	3	39.3	.357	.286	.714	3.3	4.7	13.0
