= M. C. Burton Jr. =

American basketball player (born 1937)

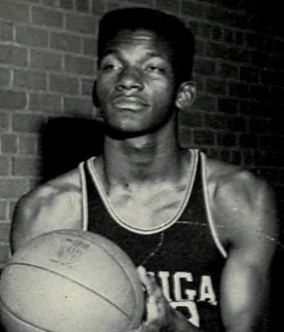
- Burton with the Michigan Wolverines, c. 1957

Personal information
- Born: September 3, 1937 (age 89) Blytheville, Arkansas, U.S.
- Listed height: 6 ft 5 in (1.96 m)
- Listed weight: 205 lb (93 kg)

Career information
- High school: Muskegon Heights (Muskegon Heights, Michigan)
- College: Michigan (1956–1959)
- NBA draft: 1959: 11th round, 75th overall pick
- Drafted by: Detroit Pistons
- Playing career: 1960–1969
- Position: Forward

Career history
- 1960–1962: Holland Oilers
- 1961–1962: Battle Creek Warriors
- 1962–1963: Toledo Tartans
- 1963–1965; 1966–1969: Grand Rapids Tackers
- Stats at Basketball Reference

Memie Clifton Burton Jr. (born September 3, 1937) is an American former basketball player and medical doctor. In 1959, he became the first player in the history of the Big Ten Conference to lead the conference in both points (469) and rebounds (379). Burton turned down offers to play in the NBA in order to attend medical school and received his medical degree in 1963. He was inducted into the University of Michigan Athletic Hall of Honor in 1988.

== Muskegon Heights High School ==
A native of Muskegon, Michigan, Burton played three years for Muskegon Heights High School from 1953 to 1955. He set the school scoring records with 1,141 points and led the team to the state basketball championship in 1954. Burton scored 22 points in the championship game, a 43–41 victory over Flint Northern before a crowd of 11,835 at Jenison field house in East Lansing, Michigan. Burton's 423 points in 1954 represented 35% of the team's season total, and he was named to the All-Tournament High School Basketball Team selected by the Associated Press. The championship was the first for Muskegon coach Oscar (Okie) Johnson who had been the school's coach for 27 years.

Burton was a straight "A" student who graduated second in his class from Muskegon Heights High School.

== University of Michigan ==
Over 50 colleges and universities offered scholarships to Burton, but Burton selected the University of Michigan, which offered him an academic scholarship and an opportunity to attend medical school.

Burton played forward for the Michigan Wolverines basketball team. In 1959, Burton was selected to the first-team All-Big Ten team and was named the Most Valuable Player on the Michigan team. He scored 460 points and collected 379 rebounds in 1959, both of which broke the Michigan school records. His 1959 totals also made him the first player to lead the Big Ten Conference in both scoring and rebounds in the same year.

== Medical school and semi-pro basketball ==
On graduating from high school, Burton announced he was not interested in playing in the NBA and would instead continue his studies at the University of Michigan Medical School. Despite Burton's stated intention, the Detroit Pistons selected him as the 73rd pick in the 1959 NBA draft. The Pistons offered Burton $15,000 a year to play in the NBA, but Burton declined. He later recalled that, in 1959, the NBA did not offer an income that could compete with a career as a medical doctor. He noted:

"The money made my decision earlier. Even the Pistons general manager at the time admitted that a degree in medicine would be worth more to me in five years than a career in basketball."

While turning down the NBA, Burton did play semi-pro basketball to help pay his way through medical school. In the summer of 1959, he toured with an All-Star team playing against the Harlem Globetrotters. During his first two years of medical school, he played on weekends for the Holland Oilers in the Midwest Professional Basketball League ("MPBL"). He also played for the Battle Creek Warriors in 1961 and the Toledo Tartans in 1962.

Burton graduated from medical school in 1963 and accepted an internship in Grand Rapids, Michigan, where he supplemented his income by playing for the Grand Rapids Tackers of the MPBL. In 1964, Burton was inducted into the U.S. Navy. He was stationed at the Great Lakes Naval Training Center, where he was permitted to play the 1964–65 season for the Grand Rapids Tackers in the newly formed North American Basketball League ("NABL").

Burton's Naval duties prevented him from playing in the 1965–66 season, but he returned to the Tackers from 1966 to 1969. During the 1967–68 season, he led the Tackers to the NABL championship, led the league in rebounds, was third in scoring, and was selected as the NABL's Most Valuable Player.

== Medical practice ==
After the 1968–69 NABL season, Burton ended his semi-pro basketball career and opened a medical practice in Grand Rapids, Michigan, specializing in obstetrics, gynecology, and infertility.

Burton is a lecturer at schools, where he encourages students not to place all their eggs in the sports basket. He notes:

"Kids need more varied role models. … [E]verybody goes out and buys a $180 pair of Reeboks and thinks that is what is going to happen to them. Instead, maybe they should buy the old $30 pair of tennis shoes and two books by Hemingway or someone else just in case things don't work out. You can have two dreams. Politics, education, the science fields, the computer age is here – there are so many dreams that these kids can have."

Burton currently works at the Phoenix Indian Medical Center in Phoenix, Arizona as director of the ambulatory surgical center. He also maintains a practice in obstetrics and gynecology in Phoenix.

== Personal life ==
Burton's brother, Ed, also played basketball.

== See also ==
- University of Michigan Athletic Hall of Honor
