= Ed Burton =

American basketball player (1939–2012)

Personal information
- Born: August 13, 1939 Blytheville, Arkansas, U.S.
- Died: May 28, 2012 (aged 72)
- Listed height: 6 ft 6 in (1.98 m)
- Listed weight: 225 lb (102 kg)

Career information
- High school: Muskegon Heights (Muskegon Heights, Michigan)
- NBA draft: 1961: undrafted
- Playing career: 1959–1965
- Position: Forward
- Number: 14, 34

Career history
- 1959–1962: Allentown Jets
- 1961: New York Knicks
- 1965: St. Louis Hawks

Career highlights
- EPBL champion (1962); All-EPBL First Team (1962)
- Stats at NBA.com
- Stats at Basketball Reference

Edward Burton (August 13, 1939 – May 28, 2012) was an American basketball player.

Burton attended Michigan State University as a freshman but dropped out in January 1958. He played for the Allentown Jets of the Eastern Professional Basketball League (EPBL) from 1959 to 1962. He won an EPBL championship with the Jets in 1962. Burton was selected to the All-EPBL First Team in 1962.

He played for the New York Knicks (1961–62) and St. Louis Hawks (1964–65) in the NBA for 15 games.

Burton's brother, M. C., also played basketball.

== Career statistics ==
Legend
GP	Games played	GS	Games started	MPG	Minutes per game
FG%	Field goal percentage	3P%	3-point field goal percentage	FT%	Free throw percentage
RPG	Rebounds per game	APG	Assists per game	SPG	Steals per game
BPG	Blocks per game	PPG	Points per game	**Bold**	Career high

=== NBA ===
==== Regular season ====
Year	Team	GP	MPG	FG%	FT%	RPG	APG	PPG
1961–62	New York	**8**	3.5	**.500**	.250	.6	.1	1.9
1964–65	St. Louis	7	**6.0**	.350	**.571**	**1.9**	**.3**	**2.6**
Career		15	4.7	.412	.455	1.2	.2	2.2
