= Chicago Majors =

American basketball team (1961–1963)

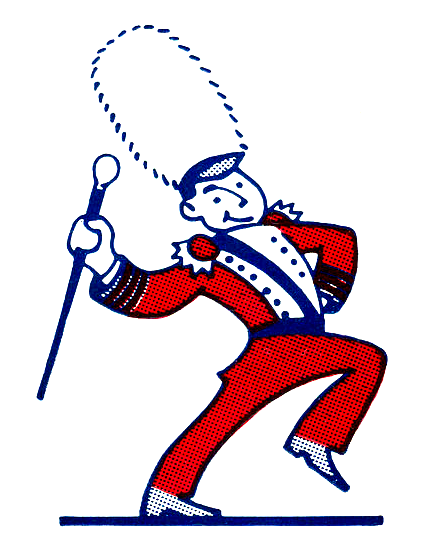
- Leagues: American Basketball League (1961–1962)
- Founded: 1961
- Folded: 1963
- Arena: Chicago Stadium
- Team colors: Red White & Blue

The Chicago Majors were a basketball team based in Chicago, Illinois, that was a member of the American Basketball League from 1961 to 1963.

== History ==
The American Basketball League played one full season, 1961–1962, and part of the next season until the league folded on December 31, 1962. The ABL was the first basketball league to have a three point shot for baskets scored far away from the goal. Other rules that set the league apart were a 30-second shooting clock and a wider free throw lane, 18 feet instead of the standard 12.

The American Basketball League was formed when Abe Saperstein did not get the Los Angeles National Basketball Association (NBA) franchise he sought. His Harlem Globetrotters had strong NBA ties. When Minneapolis Lakers owner Bob Short was permitted to move the Lakers to Los Angeles, Saperstein reacted by convincing National Alliance of Basketball Leagues (NABL) team owner Paul Cohen (Tuck Tapers) and Amateur Athletic Union (AAU) National Champion Cleveland Pipers owner George Steinbrenner to take the top NABL and AAU teams and players and form a rival league.

League franchises were: the Chicago Majors (1961–1963); Cleveland Pipers (1961–1962); Kansas City Steers (1961–63); Long Beach Chiefs (1961–1963), as Hawaii Chiefs in 1961–62; Los Angeles Jets (1961–62, disbanded during season); Oakland Oaks (1961–1963, as San Francisco Saints in 1961–1962; Philadelphia Tapers 1961–1963, as Washington Tapers in 1961–62; moved to New York during 1961–62 season; as New York Tapers in 1961–62 and the Pittsburgh Rens (1961–1963).

The Majors were owned by Abe Saperstein. Former Globetrotter Ermer Robinson was the team's business manager for their two seasons. Chicago native Ron Sobieszczyk came out of retirement to play for the Majors. In 1961 Chicago was coached by Andy Phillip.

The Majors finished 38–42 in 1960–1961 under Phillip, finishing third in the ABL Eastern Division. In 1962–1963 they finished 8–19 under Ron "Sobie" Sobieszczyk, folding along with the entire league on December 31, 1962.

== The arena ==
The Majors played in Chicago Stadium, which later became the home stadium of the Chicago Bulls.

== Media coverage ==
Although well covered by the print media, including the Chicago Tribune, unlike its NBA competition the Chicago Packers it does not seem to have had any radio or television coverage.

== Notable players ==
- Bucky Bolyard
- Jeff Cohen
- Kelly Coleman
- Nat Clifton
- Mel Davis
- Tony Jackson
- John F. Sullivan
- Roger Taylor
- Herschell Turner
- John Wessels
- Jackie Fitzpatrick

== 1962 ABL draft selections ==
Territorial selections

- Chet Walker (Bradley University)
- Dave DeBusschere (University of Detroit)

First round

- Don Nelson (University of Iowa)

Additional selections

- Bud Olsen (University of Louisville)
- Armand Reo (University of Notre Dame)
- Jim Hudock (University of North Carolina)
- Russ Marvel (North Carolina State University)
- Larry Pursiful (University of Kentucky)
- Mike Cingiser (Brown University)
- Bob Bolton (Western Michigan University)
- Alfred Kaemmerling (Princeton University)
- Lindburg Moody (South Carolina State College)
- Frank Snyder (Memphis State University)
- Ralph Wells (Northwestern University)
- Bucky Keller (Virginia Polytechnic University)
- Jackie Fitzpatrick (Knoxville College)

== Year-by-year ==
Year	League	Reg. Season	Playoffs
1961/62	ABL	3rd, Eastern	Quarterfinals
1962/63	ABL	6th	No playoff

== Game log 1961-62 ==
FIRST HALF

=== October ===
Record: 0-1 Home: 0-0; Road: 0-1; Neutral: 0-0

#	Date	H/A/N	Opponent	W/L	Score	Record	Attendance	Site
1	October 30	A	Los Angeles Jets	L	116-119	0-1	8,384	Sports Arena

=== November ===
Record: 8-8; Home: 1-1; Road: 2-6; Neutral: 5-1

#	Date	H/A/N	Opponent	W/L	Score	Record	Attendance	Site
2	November 2	A	Washington Tapers	L	64-65	0-2	5,500	Washington Coliseum
3	November 4	A	Washington Tapers	W	101-87	1-2	2,000	Washington Coliseum
4	November 7	A	Pittsburgh Rens	L	90-105	1-3	13,816	Civic Auditorium
5	November 9	N	Pittsburgh Rens	W	109-97	2-3	1,800	Washington Coliseum
6	November 10	N	Los Angeles Jets	L	106-121	2-4	2,248	Municipal Auditorium
7	November 12	N	Hawaii Chiefs	W	105-97	3-4	1,500	Municipal Auditorium
8	November 13	N	Washington Tapers	W	97-87	4-4	5,000	L.C. Walker Arena
9	November 15	N	Washington Tapers	W	96-91	5-4	6,500	Lansing Civic Center
10	November 17	H	San Francisco Saints	W	94-91 OT	6-4	12,073	Chicago Stadium
11	November 21	H	Los Angeles Jets	L	119-142	6-5	3,000	Chicago Stadium
12	November 22	N	Los Angeles Jets	W	118-90	7-5	2,895	Milwaukee Arena
13	November 24	A	Hawaii Chiefs	W	94-84	8-5	3,149	Honolulu Civic Auditorium
14	November 25	A	Hawaii Chiefs	L	110-116	8-6	1,231	Honolulu Civic Auditorium
15	November 26	A	Hawaii Chiefs	L	90-99	8-7	1,263	Honolulu Civic Auditorium
16	November 27	A	Hawaii Chiefs	L	93-105	8-8	1,195	Honolulu Civic Auditorium
17	November 28	A	Hawaii Chiefs	L	107-124	8-9	1,512	Hilo Civic Auditorium

=== December ===
Record: 7-13; Home: 1-3; Road: 4-7; Neutral: 2-3

#	Date	H/A/N	Opponent	W/L	Score	Record	Attendance	Site
18	December 1	A	San Francisco Saints	L	87-90	8-10	2,752	Civic Auditorium
19	December 2	A	San Francisco Saints	L	91-92	8-11	2,855	Civic Auditorium
20	December 5	N	Cleveland Pipers	W	110-97	9-11	2,300	Milwaukee Arena
21	December 6	H	Cleveland Pipers	W	101-93	10-11	2,127	Chicago Stadium
22	December 7	N	Cleveland Pipers	L	88-107	10-12	2,432	Civic Auditorium
23	December 8	A	Kansas City Steers	L	99-117	10-13	1,027	Municipal Auditorium
24	December 9	H	Kansas City Steers	L	88-89	10-14	1,500	Chicago Stadium
25	December 10	A	Kansas City Steers	L	89-97	10-15	1,276	Municipal Auditorium
26	December 13	A	Cleveland Pipers	L	95-117	10-16	2,500	Public Hall
27	December 14	A	Pittsburgh Rens	L	106-119	10-17	3,692	Civic Auditorium
28	December 16	H	Hawaii Chiefs	L	88-95	10-18	3,421	Chicago Stadium
29	December 17	N	Hawaii Chiefs	W	96-91	11-18	1,500	Milwaukee Arena
30	December 19	N	Cleveland Pipers	L	94-99	11-19	1,000	Boylan Catholic High School in Rockford, Illinois
31	December 20	H	Cleveland Pipers	W	98-94	12-19	1,872	Chicago Stadium
32	December 21	A	Cleveland Pipers	W	113-112	13-19	3,453	Cleveland Arena
33	December 22	A	Pittsburgh Rens	W	102-89	14-19	3,813	Civic Auditorium
34	December 24	A	Pittsburgh Rens	L	86-100	14-20	2,986	Civic Auditorium
35	December 28	A	Pittsburgh Rens	W	127-105	15-20	13,760	Civic Auditorium
36	December 29	N	Pittsburgh Rens	L	92-96	15-21	6,000	Olympia Stadium
37	December 31	H	Washington Tapers	L	92-96	15-22	5,163	Chicago Stadium

=== January ===
Record: 7-9 (first half 3-4); Home: 3-1 (first half 2-0); Road: 1-6 (first half 0-3); Neutral: 3-2 (first half 1-1)

#	Date	H/A/N	Opponent	W/L	Score	Record	Attendance	Site
38	January 1	N	Cleveland Pipers	L	99-117	15-23	1,600	Memorial Hall (University of Akron)
39	January 3	A	Cleveland Pipers	L	104-114	15-24	2,338	Public Hall
40	January 4	A	Kansas City Steers	L	93-94	15-25	9,172	Municipal Auditorium
41	January 5	N	Los Angeles Jets	W	106-103 OT	16-25	5,500	University of Wichita Field House
42	January 6	H	Los Angeles Jets	W	105-89	17-25	2,352	Chicago Stadium
43	January 10	A	Kansas City Steers	L	120-122	17-26	2,223	Municipal Auditorium
44	January 11	H	New York Tapers	W	109-99	18-26	13,012	Chicago Stadium

SECOND HALF
Record second half: 4-5; Home second half:1-1; Road second half: 1-3; Neutral second half:2-1

#	Date	H/A/N	Opponent	W/L	Score	Record	Attendance	Site
45	January 17	N	New York Tapers	W	109-99	1-0	2,143	Cleveland Arena
46	January 18	A	Kansas City Steers	L	97-114	1-1	3,840	Municipal Auditorium
47	January 19	A	Pittsburgh Rens	W	111-99	2-1	3,816	Civic Auditorium
48	January 20	H	Pittsburgh Rens	W	114-111	3-1	2,436	Chicago Stadium
49	January 21	A	Pittsburgh Rens	L	82-97	3-2	6,348	Civic Auditorium
50	January 26	H	Pittsburgh Rens	L	99-100	3-3	3,012	Chicago Stadium
51	January 27	N	Pittsburgh Rens	L	97-101	3-4	2,015	New Castle Junior/Senior High School
52	January 28	A	Pittsburgh Rens	L	87-103	3-5	4,096	Civic Auditorium
53	January 31	N	Pittsburgh Rens	W	109-99	4-5	2,430	Milwaukee Arena

=== February ===
Record: 10-6; Home: 3-0; Road: 5-4; Neutral: 2-2

#	Date	H/A/N	Opponent	W/L	Score	Record	Attendance	Site
54	February 1	H	Pittsburgh Rens	W	109-105	5-5	427	Waukegan High School
55	February 2	H	Pittsburgh Rens	L	106-108	5-6	20,482	Chicago Stadium
56	February 3	A	Cleveland Pipers	L	114-120	5-7	2,338	Public Hall
57	February 4	N	San Francisco Saints	W	109-107	6-7	1,523	Public Hall
58	February 9	H	San Francisco Saints	W	111-104	7-7	2,042	Chicago Stadium
59	February 13	A	Kansas City Steers	W	97-91	7-8	6,463	Municipal Auditorium
60	February 14	N	Kansas City Steers	L	104-109	7-9	700	University of Wichita Field House
61	February 15	A	Kansas City Steers	L	104-110	8-9	1,813	Municipal Auditorium
62	February 17	H	Cleveland Pipers	W	115-106	8-10	3,115	Chicago Stadium
63	February 18	A	San Francisco Saints	W	125-117 OT	9-10	3,176	Civic Auditorium
64	February 20	A	San Francisco Saints	L	116-119	9-11	1,156	Cow Palace
65	February 22	A	San Francisco Saints	W	118-102	10-11	1,156	Cow Palace
66	February 23	A	Hawaii Chiefs	W	125-123 OT	11-11	2,351	Honolulu Civic Auditorium
67	February 24	A	Hawaii Chiefs	W	106-99	12-11	2,307	Honolulu Civic Auditorium
68	February 25	A	Hawaii Chiefs	L	84-110	12-12	1,171	Honolulu Civic Auditorium
69	February 26	A	Hawaii Chiefs	W	97-77	13-12	1,553	Hilo Civic Auditorium
70	February 27	A	Hawaii Chiefs	L	94-95	13-13	1,447	Honolulu Civic Auditorium

=== March ===
Record: 8-4; Home: 2-0; Road: 3-2; Neutral: 3-2

#	Date	H/A/N	Opponent	W/L	Score	Record	Attendance	Site
71	March 3	H	Cleveland Pipers	W	115-111	14-13	5,228	Chicago Stadium
72	March 5	A	New York Tapers	W	102-98	15-13	1,183	Long Island Arena
73	March 7	A	New York Tapers	L	94-106	15-14	112	Long Island Arena
74	March 9	N	Hawaii Chiefs	W	104-92	16-14	7,322	Miami Beach Convention Center
75	March 10	N	Hawaii Chiefs	L	103-110	16-15	7,657	Miami Beach Convention Center
76	March 11	N	Hawaii Chiefs	W	111-95	17-15	6,013	Jacksonville Coliseum
77	March 12	N	Hawaii Chiefs	W	113-93	18-15	4,794	Jacksonville Coliseum
78	March 13	A	Cleveland Pipers	L	101-110	18-16	1,300	Ashtabula High School
79	March 14	A	Cleveland Pipers	L	122-124	18-17	2,310	Public Hall
80	March 18	A	Cleveland Pipers	L	102-111	18-18	3,215	Public Hall
81	March 19	H	Hawaii Chiefs	W	112-108	19-18	3,128	Chicago Stadium
82	March 20	A	Pittsburgh Rens	W	121-120	20-18	8,885	Civic Auditorium
83	March 22	A	Pittsburgh Rens	W	97-91	21-18	3,943	Civic Arena

ABL QUARTERFINALS

Date	H/A/N	Opponent	W/L	Score	Attendance	Site
March 30	N	New York Tapers	L	108-115	1,500	Cleveland Arena

== Game log 1962-63 ==
=== November ===
Record: 4-9; Home: 1-1; Road: 3-6; Neutral: 0-2

#	Date	H/A/N	Opponent	W/L	Score	Record	Attendance	Site
1	November 14	A	Philadelphia Tapers	L	98-116	0-1	700	Convention Hall
2	November 15	A	Philadelphia Tapers	L	46-51	0-2	see second game	Convention Hall
3	November 15	A	Philadelphia Tapers	W	65-63 OT	1-2	1,262	Convention Hall
4	November 16	A	Pittsburgh Rens	W	97-87	2-2	8,233	Civic Arena
5	November 18	A	Oakland Oaks	L	100-119	2-4	1,432	Oakland Civic Auditorium
6	November 20	A	Oakland Oaks	L	100-119	2-5	1,760	Oakland Civic Auditorium
7	November 22	A	Kansas City Steers	L	85-111	2-6	4,180	Municipal Auditorium
8	November 23	H	Kansas City Steers	W	91-90	3-6	8,721	Chicago Stadium
9	November 24	A	Kansas City Steers	L	113-128	3-7	3,867	Municipal Auditorium
10	November 25	A	Kansas City Steers	W	101-99	4-7	1,512	Municipal Auditorium
11	November 28	N	Long Beach Chiefs	L	87-96	4-8	6,829	Maple Leaf Gardens
12	November 29	N	Long Beach Chiefs	L	74-103	4-9	5,000	Rochester Community War Memorial
13	November 30	H	Long Beach Chiefs	L	99-118	4-10	3,847	Chicago Stadium

=== December ===
Record: 4-11; Home: 1-2; Road: 2-7; Neutral: 1-2

#	Date	H/A/N	Opponent	W/L	Score	Record	Attendance	Site
14	December 1	A	Kansas City Steers	L	99-116	3-11	1,811	Municipal Auditorium
15	December 2	A	Kansas City Steers	W	125-123	4-11	1,062	Municipal Auditorium
16	December 4	A	Philadelphia Tapers	L	87-113	4-12	394	Convention Hall
17	December 6	A	Pittsburgh Rens	L	103-107	4-13	942	Civic Arena
18	December 7	H	Pittsburgh Rens	L	91-94	4-14	1,872	Chicago Stadium
19	December 8	A	Kansas City Steers	L	98-114	4-15	1,496	Municipal Auditorium
20	December 10	A	Kansas City Steers	W	108-107 OT	5-15	3,166	Municipal Auditorium
21	December 11	A	Kansas City Steers	L	96-108	5-16	1,044	Municipal Auditorium
22	December 14	N	Pittsburgh Rens	W	105-94	6-16	4,395	Hershey Sports Arena
23	December 16	N	Pittsburgh Rens	L	107-109 OT	6-17	11,411	Baltimore Civic Center
24	December 20	A	Oakland Oaks	L	92-96	6-18	1,052	Oakland Civic Auditorium
25	December 21	A	Oakland Oaks	L	122-128	6-19	1,123	Oakland Civic Auditorium
26	December 22	A	Oakland Oaks	L	103-112	6-20	1,809	Oakland Civic Auditorium
27	December 28	H	Philadelphia Tapers	W	93-83	7-20	1,187	Chicago Stadium
28	December 30	N	Philadelphia Tapers	L	86-95	7-21	7,000	Cleveland Arena
