= Philadelphia Tapers =

Former American professional basketball (1962–1963 season)

- Founded: 1961
- Dissolved: December 31, 1962
- History: Washington Tapers (1961); New York Tapers (1962); Philadelphia Tapers (1962)
- Arena: Washington Coliseum; Long Island Arena; Philadelphia Civic Center; Philadelphia Arena
- Location: Washington, D.C. New York, New York; Philadelphia, Pennsylvania
- Team colors: Red, White and Blue
- Head coach: Elmer Ridley (Washington), Stan Stutz (New York), Mario Perri (Philadelphia)

The Philadelphia Tapers were an American professional basketball team that played a partial 1962–1963 season in the American Basketball League (1961–1962). It traces its history to the 1950s AAU New York Tapers.

== AAU New York Tapers ==
Originally the amateur New York Tapers, the team played in the NABL and was sponsored by Technical Tape Corporation, makers of Tuck brand adhesive and recording tapes. The Tapers were a top AAU club team in the 1950s featuring many former collegiate stars and pro players.

== Washington Tapers 1961–1962 ==
The American Basketball League played one full season, 1961–1962, and part of the next season until the league folded on December 31, 1962. The ABL was the first basketball league to have a three point shot for baskets scored far away from the goal. Other rules that set the league apart were a 30-second shooting clock and a wider free throw lane, 18 feet instead of the standard 12.

The American Basketball League was formed when Abe Saperstein did not get the Los Angeles National Basketball Association (NBA) franchise he sought. His Harlem Globetrotters had strong NBA ties. When Minneapolis Lakers owner Bob Short was permitted to move the Lakers to Los Angeles, Saperstein reacted by convincing National Alliance of Basketball Leagues (NABL) team owner Paul Cohen (Tuck Tapers) and Amateur Athletic Union (AAU) National Champion Cleveland Pipers owner George Steinbrenner to take the top NABL and AAU teams and players and form a rival league.

The league's franchises were: the Chicago Majors (1961-1963); Cleveland Pipers (1961-1962); Kansas City Steers (1961-1963); Long Beach Chiefs (1961-1963), as Hawaii Chiefs in 1961-62; Los Angeles Jets (1961-1962) — disbanded during season); Oakland Oaks (1961-1963), as San Francisco Saints in 1961-62; Philadelphia Tapers (1961-1963), as Washington Tapers in 1961-62 — moved to New York during 1961-62 season, as New York Tapers; and the Pittsburgh Rens (1961-1963).

When Saperstein's American Basketball League was born in 1961, Tuck Tape owner Paul Cohen purchased a franchise, gave it the Tapers name, and placed it in Washington, D.C. (playing at the Washington Coliseum). Cohen signed Gene Conley, who had played for the Boston Celtics and pitched for the Milwaukee Braves. While with the Tapers, Conley often accompanied Paul Cohen on sales calls for his Tuck Tape Company.

The team was a failure in Washington, and Cohen transplanted the franchise mid-season — on January 2, 1962 — to Commack, New York, renaming it the New York Tapers. They played their final game in New York at Long Island Arena on March 14, 1962.

== Philadelphia Tapers 1962–1963 ==
When the ABL began their second season in 1962, the Tapers moved to Philadelphia, where Cohen hoped to take advantage of the NBA Philadelphia Warriors' (and Wilt Chamberlain’s) departure to San Francisco. Harvey Pollack kept the Tapers' statistics as he had for the Warriors. The Tapers hired Mario Perri to coach the team in Philadelphia. Perri had been the athletic director at the Technical Tape Corp where he coached the softball team to a national title.

In a bizarre bit of scheduling, the team twice faced the Chicago Majors on November 15, winning the first game, 51-46, before dropping the nightcap, 65-63, in overtime. The Tapers played only 28 games during the abbreviated 1962–1963 season. The final game was against the Chicago Majors in a neutral site game at the Cleveland Arena on December 30, 1962.

== Players ==
During their time, the Tapers had many outstanding players.

Star of the team was Georgia Tech Yellow Jackets guard Roger Kaiser, who later became a college coach at West Georgia College and Life College.

Another star was 6'10" center Bill Chmielewski, out of the University of Dayton. In 1964, he was selected in the NBA draft by the Cincinnati Royals, but never played in the NBA.

Also starring on the team was Sylvester Blye, a strapping 6-9 player who saw his college career at Seattle University quashed after one game when officials discovered that he had been playing professionally for the touring Harlem Clowns. Blye then went to work for Tuck Tape and became the team's signature player. He was known as a legend in the New York Rucker league and was a full-fledged star in the ABL, but no NBA team ever called on him after the league's demise.

Another notable Taper was point guard Cleo Hill, who was a superstar at Winston-Salem State University several years prior to Earl Monroe. Hill was a number one draft pick of the NBA St. Louis Hawks but was cut a year later. His stay with the Tapers also did not result in a call by any NBA teams.

== ABL year-by-year ==
Year	League	Reg. season	Playoffs
1961/62	ABL	4th, Eastern	Semifinals
1962/63	ABL	5th	No playoff

== Media coverage ==
The Tapers got radio coverage in Washington on WTOP. They didn't have any radio or television in New York or Philadelphia.

== Game log Washington 1961 ==
=== First half ===
==== November ====
Record: 3-14; Home: 1-6; Road:0-1; Neutral: 2-7

#	Date	H/A/N	Opponent	W/L	Score	Record	Attendance	Site
1	November 2	H	Chicago Majors	W	65-64	1-0	5,500	Washington Coliseum
2	November 4	H	Chicago Majors	L	87-101	1-1	2,000	Washington Coliseum
3	November 7	H	Hawaii Chiefs	L	76-91	1-2	1,196	Washington Coliseum
4	November 9	H	Hawaii Chiefs	W	92-91	2-2	1,800	Washington Coliseum
5	November 10	N	Pittsburgh Rens	L	88-111	2-3	500	Norfolk Arena
6	November 11	H	Pittsburgh Rens	L	84-95	2-4	350	Washington Coliseum
7	November 13	N	Chicago Majors	L	87-97	2-5	5,000	L.C. Walker Arena
8	November 15	N	Chicago Majors	L	91-96	2-6	6,500	Lansing Civic Center
9	November 17	H	Hawaii Chiefs	W	100-89	3-6	489	Washington Coliseum
10	November 18	H	Hawaii Chiefs	W	119-110	4-6	1,775	Washington Coliseum
11	November 21	H	Kansas City Steers	L	110-124	4-7		Washington Coliseum
12	November 22	N	Kansas City Steers	L	96-106	4-8	743	Richmond Arena
13	November 24	H	San Francisco Saints	L	92-95	4-9	350	Washington Coliseum
14	November 25	H	San Francisco Saints	W	91-88 OT	5-9		Washington Coliseum
15	November 27	A	Pittsburgh Rens	L	94-111	5-10	3,596	Pittsburgh Civic Auditorium
16	November 29	N	Los Angeles Jets	W	103-100	6-10	3,872	Pittsburgh Civic Auditorium

==== December ====
Record: 7-12; Home: 3-4; Road: 3-7; Neutral: 1-1

#	Date	H/A/N	Opponent	W/L	Score	Record	Attendance	Site
17	December 1	A	Hawaii Chiefs	L	83-93	6-11	2,471	Honolulu Civic Auditorium
18	December 2	A	Hawaii Chiefs	L	83-102	6-12	2,868	Honolulu Civic Auditorium
19	December 3	A	Hawaii Chiefs	W	90-86	7-12	1,846	Honolulu Civic Auditorium
20	December 4	A	Hawaii Chiefs	W	122-117	8-12	1,611	Conroy Bowl
21	December 5	A	Hawaii Chiefs	L	93-115	8-13	1,509	Honolulu Civic Auditorium
22	December 9	A	Los Angeles Jets	L	99-115	8-14	938	Olympic Auditorium
23	December 10	A	Los Angeles Jets	W	101-100	9-14	1,773	Olympic Auditorium
24	December 12	N	Hawaii Chiefs	L	81-84	9-15	1,562	Olympic Auditorium
25	December 13	A	San Francisco Saints	L	89-94	9-16	3,384	Cow Palace
26	December 15	H	Cleveland Pipers	W	108-100	10-16		Washington Coliseum
27	December 16	H	Cleveland Pipers	L	84-99	10-17	5,745	Washington Coliseum
28	December 17	N	Cleveland Pipers	W	90-88	11-17	6,293	Pittsburgh Civic Auditorium
29	December 19	H	Los Angeles Jets	L	96-102	11-18	1,000	Washington Coliseum
30	December 20	H	Los Angeles Jets	L	89-93	11-19		Washington Coliseum
31	December 21	H	Los Angeles Jets	L	96-102	11-20		Washington Coliseum
32	December 26	H	Cleveland Pipers	W	109-108	12-20	1,110	Washington Coliseum
33	December 28	H	Cleveland Pipers	W	123-106	13-20	1,197	Washington Coliseum
34	December 29	A	Cleveland Pipers	L	98-124	13-21	3,518	Public Hall
35	December 30	A	Cleveland Pipers	L	104-108	13-22	7,218	Public Hall
36	December 31	A	Chicago Majors	W	96-92	14-22	5,163	Chicago Stadium

== Game log New York 1962 ==
=== First half ===
==== January ====
Record: 3-12 total, 0-6 first half; Home: 1-2 total, 0-0 first half; Road: 2-9 total, 0-6 first half; Neutral: 0-1 total, 0-0 first half

#	Date	H/A/N	Opponent	W/L	Score	Record	Attendance	Site
37	January 2	A	Los Angeles Jets	L	104-112	14-23	583	Olympic Auditorium
38	January 4	A	Los Angeles Jets	L	104-107	14-24	1,165	Olympic Auditorium
39	January 6	A	Kansas City Steers	L	88-118	14-25	1,168	Municipal Auditorium
40	January 7	A	Kansas City Steers	L	90-110	14-26	908	Municipal Auditorium
41	January 9	A	Cleveland Pipers	L	124-141	14-27	2,114	Admiral King High School in Lorain, Ohio
42	January 11	A	Chicago Majors	L	99-109	14-28	13,012	Chicago Stadium

=== Second half ===
Record January second half only: 3-6; home: 1-2; road: 2-3; neutral: 0-1

#	Date	H/A/N	Opponent	W/L	Score	Record	Attendance	Site
43	January 15	N	Kansas City Steers	L	96-122	0-1	3,482	Pittsburgh Civic Auditorium
44	January 16	H	Pittsburgh Rens	L	97-105	0-1	1,600	Long Island Arena
45	January 17	N	Chicago Majors	L	95-115	0-3	2,143	Cleveland Arena
46	January 19	A	San Francisco Saints	L	104-118	0-4	9,978	Cow Palace
47	January 21	A	San Francisco Saints	L	105-108	0-5	3,862	Cow Palace
48	January 23	H	Pittsburgh Rens	W	129-123	1-5	261	Long Island Arena
49	January 25	A	Pittsburgh Rens	W	110-101	2-5	3,862	Pittsburgh Civic Auditorium
50	January 29	A	Pittsburgh Rens	L	107-124	2-6	3,783	Pittsburgh Auditorium
51	January 30	H	Pittsburgh Rens	W	114-93	3-6	244	Long Island Arena
52	January 31	A	San Francisco Saints	W	112-106	4-6	1,935	Civic Auditorium

==== February ====
Record: 9-6; Home:3-3; Road:1-5; Neutral: 1-3

#	Date	H/A/N	Opponent	W/L	Score	Record	Attendance	Site
53	February 2	A	San Francisco Saints	L	98-101	4-7	3,269	Civic Auditorium
54	February 3	N	San Francisco Saints	L	109-113	4-8	2,338	Public Hall
55	February 4	A	Cleveland Pipers	W	112-109	5-8	1,523	Public Hall
56	February 7	N	Pittsburgh Rens	W	130-111	6-8	1,738	Public Hall
57	February 8	A	Pittsburgh Rens	L	115-129	6-9	3,917	Pittsburgh Civic Auditorium
58	February 10	H	San Francisco Saints	W	123-119	7-9	300	Long Island Arena
59	February 12	H	San Francisco Saints	W	109-100	8-9	1,300	Long Island Arena
60	February 13	H	San Francisco Saints	L	120-129	8-10	500	Long Island Arena
61	February 17	N	Hawaii Chiefs	W	103-85	9-10	5,700	Oklahoma City Municipal Auditorium
62	February 18	N	Hawaii Chiefs	L	103-105	9-11	5,000	Fairgrounds Pavilion
63	February 20	N	Kansas City Steers	L	106-114	9-12	10,064	Kiel Auditorium
64	February 21	A	Kansas City Steers	L	109-130	9-13	9,562	Municipal Auditorium
65	February 23	A	Cleveland Pipers	L	121-138	9-14	3,417	Cleveland Arena
66	February 24	H	Pittsburgh Rens	W	148-123	10-14		Long Island Arena
67	February 25	A	Pittsburgh Rens	L	99-117	10-15	2,083	Farrell High School
68	February 27	H	Cleveland Pipers	W	101-90	11-15	147	Long Island Arena
69	February 28	H	Cleveland Pipers	W	102-86	12-15	250	Long Island Arena

==== March ====
Record:5-7; Home:2-6; Road:0-0; Neutral: 1-0

#	Date	H/A/N	Opponent	W/L	Score	Record	Attendance	Site
70	March 3	H	Pittsburgh Rens	L	87-98	12-16	1,500	Long Island Arena
71	March 5	H	Chicago Majors	L	98-102	12-17	1,183	Long Island Arena
72	March 7	H	Chicago Majors	W	106-94	13-17	112	Long Island Arena
73	March 8	H	Kansas City Steers	W	108-107	14-17		Long Island Arena
74	March 10	H	Kansas City Steers	L	104-112	14-18	762	Long Island Arena
75	March 13	H	Hawaii Chiefs	W	102-98	15-18	200	Long Island Arena
76	March 14	H	Hawaii Chiefs	L	95-110	15-19		Long Island Arena
77	March 15	N	Pittsburgh Rens	W	103-101	16-19	1,519	Public Hall
78	March 18	N	Pittsburgh Rens	L	104-114	16-20	5,200	New Haven Arena
79	March 20	A	Kansas City Steers	L	98-120	16-21	4,245	Municipal Auditorium
80	March 21	A	Kansas City Steers	L	101-110	16-22	1,218	Municipal Auditorium
81	March 22	N	Cleveland Pipers	W	100-98	17-22	3,943	Pittsburgh Civic Auditorium

=== ABL second half preliminary round ===
Date	H/A/N	Opponent	W/L	Score	Attendance	Site
March 29	N	Hawaii Chiefs	W	125-116 OT	3,453	Pittsburgh Civic Auditorium

=== Quarterfinal ===
Date	H/A/N	Opponent	W/L	Score	Attendance	Site
March 30	N	Chicago Majors	W	115-100	1,500	Cleveland Arena

=== Semifinal ===
Date	H/A/N	Opponent	W/L	Score	Attendance	Site
March 31	N	Cleveland Pipers	L	84-105	300	Municipal Auditorium

== Game log 1962-63 Philadelphia ==
=== November ===
Record: 3-5; Home:3-2; Road:0-2; Neutral: 0-1

#	Date	H/A/N	Opponent	W/L	Score	Record	Attendance	Site
1	November 14	H	Chicago Majors	W	116-98	1-0	700	Convention Hall
2	November 15	H	Chicago Majors	W	51-46	2-0	see second game	Convention Hall
3	November 15	H	Chicago Majors	L	63-65 OT	2-1	1,262	Convention Hall
4	November 18	A	Pittsburgh Rens	L	83-113	2-2	4,324	Civic Arena
5	November 21	H	Pittsburgh Rens	L	118-124	2-3	794	Philadelphia Arena
6	November 24	H	Pittsburgh Rens	W	100-98	3-3	1,794	Philadelphia Arena
7	November 25	A	Pittsburgh Rens	L	106-118	3-4	2,564	Civic Arena
8	November 26	N	Pittsburgh Rens	L	95-98	3-5	1,913	McKeesport Vocational High School

=== December ===
Record: 7-13; Home: 4-2; Road: 1-10; Neutral: 2-1

#	Date	H/A/N	Opponent	W/L	Score	Record	Attendance	Site
9	December 1	H	Long Beach Chiefs	L	86-93	3-6	3,479	Convention Hall
10	December 2	H	Oakland Oaks	W	89-79	4-6	1,556	Convention Hall
11	December 4	H	Chicago Majors	W	113-85	5-6	394	Convention Hall
12	December 6	H	Oakland Oaks	W	82-80	6-6	874	Convention Hall
13	December 8	N	Oakland Oaks	W	101-98	7-6	2,800	New Haven Arena
14	December 11	A	Long Beach Chiefs	W	106-102	8-6	1,088	Long Beach Arena
15	December 12	A	Long Beach Chiefs	L	89-99	8-7	704	Long Beach Arena
16	December 13	A	Long Beach Chiefs	L	90-94	8-8	764	Long Beach Arena
17	December 14	A	Oakland Oaks	L	84-86	8-9	1,764	Oakland Auditorium
18	December 15	A	Oakland Oaks	L	115-117	8-10	750	McClymonds High School
19	December 16	A	Oakland Oaks	L	102-104	8-11	1,845	Oakland Auditorium
20	December 18	A	Kansas City Steers	L	106-119	8-12	1,642	Municipal Auditorium
21	December 19	A	Kansas City Steers	L	84-117	8-13	1,902	Municipal Auditorium
22	December 20	A	Kansas City Steers	L	88-99	8-14	1,411	Municipal Auditorium
23	December 21	N	Kansas City Steers	L	107-111	8-15	3,500	Kiel Auditorium
24	December 23	A	Kansas City Steers	L	97-106	8-16	10,288	Municipal Auditorium
25	December 25	H	Pittsburgh Rens	W	110-102	9-16	3,574	Convention Hall
26	December 27	H	Pittsburgh Rens	L	95-110	9-17	2,382	Convention Hall
27	December 28	A	Chicago Majors	L	83-93	9-18	1,187	Chicago Stadium
28	December 30	N	Chicago Majors	W	95-86	10-18	7,000	Cleveland Arena
