= Los Angeles Jets =

- Leagues: American Basketball League (1961–62)
- Founded: 1961
- Folded: 1962
- Arena: Los Angeles Memorial Sports Arena; Olympic Auditorium
- Team colors: Green and White

The Los Angeles Jets were an American basketball team based in Los Angeles, California, founded by Jack Blanck and Len Corbosiero, that was a member of the American Basketball League in the league's 1961–62 season.

== History ==
The American Basketball League played one full season, 1961–1962, and part of the next season until the league folded on December 31, 1962. The ABL was the first basketball league to have a three point shot for baskets scored far away from the goal. Other rules that set the league apart were a 30-second shooting clock and a wider free throw lane, 18 feet instead of the standard 12.

The American Basketball League was formed when Abe Saperstein did not get the Los Angeles National Basketball Association (NBA) franchise he sought. His Harlem Globetrotters had strong NBA ties. When Minneapolis Lakers owner Bob Short was permitted to move the Lakers to Los Angeles, Saperstein reacted by convincing National Alliance of Basketball Leagues (NABL) team owner Paul Cohen (Tuck Tapers) and Amateur Athletic Union (AAU) National Champion Cleveland Pipers owner George Steinbrenner to take the top NABL and AAU teams and players and form a rival league.

League franchises were: the Chicago Majors (1961-1963); Cleveland Pipers (1961-1962); Kansas City Steers (1961–63); Long Beach Chiefs (1961-1963), as Hawaii Chiefs in 1961-62; Los Angeles Jets (1961–62, disbanded during season); Oakland Oaks (1961-1963, as San Francisco Saints in 1961-1962; Philadelphia Tapers 1961-1963, as Washington Tapers in 1961-62; moved to New York during 1961-62 season; as New York Tapers in 1961-62 and the Pittsburgh Rens (1961-1963).

The team's only coach was Bill Sharman. The assistant coach was Edwin A. "Scotty" McDonald, a former Loyola (of Los Angeles) coach, and coach of many AAU teams, NBA scout, and advisor.

The team was competing for ticket buyers in a market that included the recently relocated Lakers, as well as the college teams of USC and UCLA. Partway through their first and only season, with a respectable record of 24–15, the Jets franchise found itself unable to draw enough spectators to continue. The team disbanded during its only season on January 18, 1962. A new team taking the representation of the Jets franchise would participate in the 1962 ABL Draft process (albeit going by a tentative Los Angeles name), but that franchise would never materialize into action following the defending champion Cleveland Pipers later folding operations also.

The Jets played at both the Los Angeles Memorial Sports Arena and Olympic Auditorium in Los Angeles.

== Roster ==
Jets players include the following players:

- Larry Beck
- Bob Blue
- George Finley
- Larry Friend
- Charlie Hadden
- Hal Lear
- Jim Palmer
- Jim Powell
- Bill Sharman (player-coach)
- Bill Spivey
- Dan Swartz
- Henry Whitney
- George Yardley

=== Basketball Hall of Famers ===
Los Angeles Jets Hall of Famers
Players
No.	Name	Position	Tenure	Inducted
21	Bill Sharman	SG	1961–1962	1976
Coaches
Name		Position	Tenure	Inducted
Bill Sharman		Head coach	1961–1962	2004

== Year-by-year ==
Year	League	Reg. season	Wins	Losses	Playoffs
1961/62	ABL	4th, Western	24	15	N/A (Folded)

== Media Coverage ==
The Jets were one of only two ABL teams (Pittsburgh was the other) with television coverage. KTTV televised four games, including the opener in San Francisco, the home opener vs the Chicago Majors at the Los Angeles Memorial Sports Arena and two others at the Grand Olympic Auditorium with Bill Welsh announcing. The home matches were on KABC (AM) with Sam Balter doing play-by-play.

== Game log ==
=== October ===
Record: 1-1; Home: 1-0; Road: 0-1

#	Date	H/A/N	Opponent	W/L	Score	Record	Attendance	Site
1	October 27	A	San Francisco Saints	L	96-99	0-1	5,137	Cow Palace
2	October 30	H	Chicago Majors	W	119-116	1-1	8,384	Los Angeles Sports Arena

=== November ===
Record: 7-7; Home: 3-3; Road: 2-3; Neutral: 2-1

#	Date	H/A/N	Opponent	W/L	Score	Record	Attendance	Site
3	November 6	H	San Francisco Saints	L	113-116	1-2	1,364	Olympic Auditorium
4	November 7	H	San Francisco Saints	W	110-98	2-2	1,788	Olympic Auditorium
5	November 10	N	Chicago Majors	W	121-106	3-2	2,016	Municipal Auditorium
6	November 12	A	Kansas City Steers	L	109-113	3-3	1,869	Municipal Auditorium
7	November 13	H	Cleveland Pipers	W	108-99	4-3	3,176	Olympic Auditorium
8	November 14	H	Cleveland Pipers	W	106-90	5-3	2,630	Olympic Auditorium
9	November 17	H	Kansas City Steers	L	109-115	5-4	2,016	Olympic Auditorium
10	November 19	H	Kansas City Steers	L	85-100	5-5	3,227	Olympic Auditorium
11	November 21	A	Chicago Majors	W	142-119	6-5	3,000 (EST)	Chicago Stadium
12	November 22	N	Chicago Majors	L	90-118	6-6	2,895	Milwaukee Arena
13	November 24	A	Kansas City Steers	L	108-121	6-7	3,347	Municipal Auditorium
14	November 26	A	Kansas City Steers	W	81-72	7-7	2,225	Municipal Auditorium
15	November 27	N	San Francisco Saints	W	97-76	8-7	3,596	Civic Arena
16	November 29	N	Washington Tapers	L	100-103	8-8	3,872	Civic Arena

=== December ===
Record: 12-5; Home: 5-1; Road: 5-4; Neutral: 2-0

#	Date	H/A/N	Opponent	W/L	Score	Record	Attendance	Site
17	December 1	N	Cleveland Pipers	L	92-113	8-9	755	Columbus Fairgrounds Coliseum
18	December 2	A	Cleveland Pipers	W	116-109	9-9	3,254	Public Hall
19	December 3	A	Pittsburgh Rens	W	88-76	10-9	2,733	Civic Arena
20	December 6	N	Pittsburgh Rens	W	104-93	11-9	2,127	Chicago Stadium
21	December 7	A	Pittsburgh Rens	L	93-107	11-10	2,342	Civic Arena
22	December 9	H	Washington Tapers	W	115-99	12-10	938	Olympic Auditorium
23	December 10	H	Washington Tapers	L	100-101	12-11	1,773	Olympic Auditorium
24	December 12	H	San Francisco Saints	W	96-89	13-11	1,562	Olympic Auditorium
25	December 13	N	Hawaii Chiefs	W	90-89	14-11	3,384	Cow Palace
26	December 16	H	San Francisco Saints	W	111-88	15-11	522	Olympic Auditorium
27	December 17	H	San Francisco Saints	W	115-103	16-11	256	Olympic Auditorium
28	December 19	A	Washington Tapers	W	108-90	17-11		Washington Coliseum
29	December 20	A	Washington Tapers	W	93-89	18-11		Washington Coliseum
30	December 21	A	Washington Tapers	W	102-96	19-11		Washington Coliseum
31	December 26	A	San Francisco Saints	L	110-114	19-12	3,045	San Francisco Civic Auditorium
32	December 28	A	San Francisco Saints	L	103-104	19-13	4,084	San Francisco Civic Auditorium
33	December 31	H	Pittsburgh Rens	W	119-108	20-13	1,798	Olympic Auditorium

=== January ===
Record: 4-2; Home: 3-0; Road: 0-1; Neutral: 1-1

#	Date	H/A/N	Opponent	W/L	Score	Record	Attendance	Site
34	January 2	H	Washington Tapers	W	112-104	21-13	583	Olympic Auditorium
35	January 4	H	Washington Tapers	W	107-104	22-13	1,165	Olympic Auditorium
36	January 5	N	Chicago Majors	L	103-106 (OT)	22-14	5,500 (EST)	Wichita, Kansas
37	January 6	A	Chicago Majors	L	89-105	22-15	2,352	Chicago Stadium
38	January 9	H	Hawaii Chiefs	W	140-103	23-15	2,791	Olympic Auditorium
39	January 10	N	Hawaii Chiefs	W	123-122	24-15	2,684	Cow Palace
