= Oakland Oaks (ABL) =

- Nickname: San Francisco Saints (1961–1962)
- Leagues: American Basketball League (1961–62)
- Founded: 1961
- Folded: 1962
- Arena: Cow Palace; San Francisco Civic Auditorium; Oakland Auditorium
- Team colors: Green and Yellow

The Oakland Oaks were an American basketball team based in Oakland, California that was a member of the American Basketball League (1961–1962). They played under this name in the 1962–1963 season, after having played as the San Francisco Saints in the 1961–1962 season.

== History ==
The American Basketball League played one full season, 1961–1962, and part of the next season until the league folded on December 31, 1962. The ABL was the first basketball league to have a three point shot for baskets scored far away from the goal. Other rules that set the league apart were a 30-second shooting clock and a wider free throw lane, 18 feet instead of the standard 12.

League franchises were the Chicago Majors (1961–1962); Cleveland Pipers (1961–1962); Kansas City Steers (1961–63); Long Beach Chiefs (1961–1962), as Hawaii Chiefs in 1961–62; Los Angeles Jets (1961–62, disbanded during season); Oakland Oaks 1962–1962, as San Francisco Saints in 1961–1962; Philadelphia Tapers 1961–1962, as Washington Tapers in 1961–62; moved to New York during 1961–62 season; as New York Tapers in 1961-62 and the Pittsburgh Rens (1961–1962).

Owned by George McKeon, the San Francisco Saints moved to Oakland to become the Oaks after the NBA San Francisco Warriors started play in 1962–1963, after moving from Philadelphia.

The Saints finished 32–32 in 1961–1962, Coached by Phil Woolpert, Kevin O'Shea and Al Brightman. In 1962–1963, the Oakland Oaks finished 11-14 under Coach Ermer Robinson.

The Oaks folded with the rest on the league on December 31, 1962.

== The arenas ==
The San Francisco Saints (1962–1962) played at the historic Cow Palace and the San Francisco Civic Auditorium, located at 99 Grove St San Francisco, CA 94102. The Cow Palace is located at 2600 Geneva Avenue, Daly City, California. The Oakland Oaks played at Oakland Auditorium, located at 10 10th Street, Oakland, CA.

== Media Coverage ==
The Saints had nearly all their games (except the road trip to Hawaii) broadcast on KFRC. The coverage ended with the team's move to Oakland.

== Basketball Hall of Fame alumni ==
- Phil Woolpert Inducted, 1992

== Notable players ==
- Whitey Bell
- Gene Brown
- Archie Dees
- Mike Farmer
- Jim Hadnot
- Ron Horn
- Ken Sears
- Govoner Vaughn
- Wayne Yates

== Year-by-year ==
Year	League	Reg. season	Playoffs
1962–63	ABL	4th	No playoff
1961–62	ABL	2nd, Western	Quarterfinals
