= Long Beach Chiefs =

- Founded: 1961
- Dissolved: 1963
- History: Long Beach Chiefs (1962–1963); Hawaii Chiefs (1961–1962)
- Arena: Long Beach Arena; Civic Auditorium, Honolulu; Conroy Bowl, Honolulu; Bloch Arena, Honolulu; Hilo Civic Auditorium
- Location: Long Beach, California (1962–1963); Honolulu, Hawaii (1961–1962)
- Team colors: Red, White and Yellow
- Head coach: Red Rocha; Al Brightman

The Long Beach Chiefs were an American basketball team based in Honolulu, Hawaii (1961–62) and Long Beach, California (1962–63) that was a member of the American Basketball League.

== History ==
The American Basketball League played one full season, 1961–1962, and part of the next season until the league folded on December 31, 1962. The ABL was the first basketball league to have a three point shot for baskets scored far away from the goal. Other rules that set the league apart were a 30-second shooting clock and a wider free throw lane, 18 feet instead of the standard 12.

The American Basketball League was formed when Abe Saperstein did not get the Los Angeles National Basketball Association (NBA) franchise he sought. His Harlem Globetrotters had strong NBA ties. When Minneapolis Lakers owner Bob Short was permitted to move the Lakers to Los Angeles, Saperstein reacted by convincing National Alliance of Basketball Leagues (NABL) team owner Paul Cohen (Tuck Tapers) and Amateur Athletic Union (AAU) National Champion Cleveland Pipers owner George Steinbrenner to take the top NABL and AAU teams and players and form a rival league.

League franchises were the Chicago Majors (1961–1963); Cleveland Pipers (1961–1962); Kansas City Steers (1961–63); Long Beach Chiefs (1961–1963), as Hawaii Chiefs in 1961–62; Los Angeles Jets (1961–62, disbanded during season); Oakland Oaks 1961–1963, as San Francisco Saints in 1961–1962; Philadelphia Tapers 1961–1963, as Washington Tapers in 1961–62; moved to New York during 1961–62 season; as New York Tapers in 1961–62 and the Pittsburgh Rens (1961–1963).

The team was known as the Hawaii Chiefs from 1961–62. Originally, Art Kim wanted to name the franchise the Hawaii Aliis, a name for Hawaiian royalty, but he was forced to change the name of the team to the Chiefs by June 1961 due to the native Hawaiians informing Kim that it was considered taboo to use the aliis name in conjunction to ordinary people since it could only be associated with Hawaiian royalty.

The Chiefs were owned by Art Kim, who was later the owner of the Anaheim Amigos of the American Basketball Association. His previous team ownership with the Chiefs in Hawaii and Long Beach would be a factor in Kim being named an inaugural owner for the Amigos franchise in the ABA.

They finished 13–28 (1961–1962) and 16–8 (1962–1963) under coaches Red Rocha and Al Brightman. They started 10–0 in 1962–1963.

== The Arenas ==
The Chiefs played at the Long Beach Arena. The arena is still in use by Long Beach State University athletics. The location is 300 E Ocean Blvd, Long Beach, CA 90802.

In Honolulu they rotated between the Civic Auditorium, the Conroy Bowl at Schofield Barracks and Bloch Arena. The Civic Auditorium in Honolulu was demolished in 1973. It was located on South King Street. It was replaced by an American Security Bank Building, now the Interstate Building.

Conroy Bowl is now a medical facility on Schofield Barracks. The address is 627–699 Trimble Road, Wahiawa, HI 96786.

Bloch Arena in Pearl Harbor is still in use today and also hosted the collegiate Pearl Harbor Basketball Invitational. The address is 224 A Avenue, Honolulu, HI 96818.

== Media Coverage ==
In Hawaii, the Chiefs got radio coverage of most home games on KGU (AM). After the move to California, the Chiefs had radio coverage on KLFM.

== Notable alumni ==
- Bob Anderegg
- Frank Burgess
- Jeff Cohen
- Rick Herrscher
- Bill Spivey
- Govoner Vaughn

== Year by year ==
Year	League	Reg. season	Playoffs
1961/62	ABL	3rd, Western	Preliminary Round
1962/63	ABL	2nd	No playoff

== Game log 1961-62 Hawaii ==
FIRST HALF

=== November ===
Record: 5-10; Home: 5-1; Road: 3-5; Neutral: 0-1

#	Date	H/A/N	Opponent	W/L	Score	Record	Attendance	Site
1	November 7	A	Washington Tapers	W	91-76	1-0	1,196	Washington Coliseum
2	November 9	A	Washington Tapers	L	91-92	1-1	1,800	Washington Coliseum
3	November 10	A	Kansas City Steers	L	101-121	1-2	2,248	Municipal Auditorium
4	November 12	N	Chicago Majors	L	97-105	1-3	1,500	Municipal Auditorium
5	November 14	A	Pittsburgh Rens	L	99-100	1-4	3,093	Pittsburgh Civic Auditorium
6	November 16	A	Pittsburgh Rens	L	99-106	1-5	2,743	Pittsburgh Civic Auditorium
7	November 17	A	Washington Tapers	L	89-100	1-6	489	Washington Coliseum
8	November 18	A	Washington Tapers	L	110-119 OT	1-7	1,775	Washington Coliseum
9	November 21	A	Cleveland Pipers	L	74-91	1-8	3,318	Public Hall
10	November 22	A	Cleveland Pipers	L	96-97	1-9	3,569	Public Hall
11	November 24	H	Chicago Majors	L	84-94	1-10	3,146	Honolulu Civic Auditorium
12	November 25	H	Chicago Majors	W	116-110	2-10	1,231	Honolulu Civic Auditorium
13	November 26	H	Chicago Majors	W	99-90	3-10	1,263	Bloch Arena
14	November 27	H	Chicago Majors	W	105-93	4-10	1,195	Honolulu Civic Auditorium
15	November 28	H	Chicago Majors	W	124-107	5-10	1,512	Hilo Civic Auditorium

=== December ===
Record: 7-12; Home: 5-5; Road: 1-4; Neutral: 1-3

#	Date	H/A/N	Opponent	W/L	Score	Record	Attendance	Site
16	December 1	H	Washington Tapers	W	93-83	6-10	2,471	Conroy Bowl
17	December 2	H	Washington Tapers	W	102-83	7-10	2,868	Honolulu Civic Auditorium
18	December 3	H	Washington Tapers	L	86-90	7-11	1,846	Honolulu Civic Auditorium
19	December 4	H	Washington Tapers	L	117-122	7-12	1,611	Honolulu Civic Auditorium
20	December 5	H	Washington Tapers	W	115-93	8-12	1,509	Honolulu Civic Auditorium
21	December 8	A	San Francisco Saints	L	88-98	8-13	1,411	Oakland Auditorium
22	December 9	A	San Francisco Saints	L	84-100	8-14	3,368	Civic Auditorium
23	December 12	N	Washington Tapers	W	84-81	9-14	1,562	Olympic Auditorium
24	December 13	N	Los Angeles Jets	L	89-90	9-15	3,284	Cow Palace
25	December 16	A	Chicago Majors	W	95-88	10-15	3,421	Chicago Stadium
26	December 17	N	Chicago Majors	L	91-96	10-16	1,500	Milwaukee Arena
27	December 19	N	San Francisco Saints	L	101-104	10-17	982	Sacramento Memorial Auditorium
28	December 20	A	San Francisco Saints	L	95-103	10-18	2,743	Civic Auditorium
29	December 22	A	San Francisco Saints	L	113-117	10-19	1,538	Civic Auditorium
30	December 25	H	Kansas City Steers	W	88-87	11-19	2,543	Honolulu Civic Auditorium
31	December 26	H	Kansas City Steers	L	97-108	11-20	2,170	Hilo Civic Auditorium
32	December 28	H	Kansas City Steers	L	93-121	11-21	1,878	Honolulu Civic Auditorium
33	December 29	H	Kansas City Steers	W	110-99	12-21	1,370	Honolulu Civic Auditorium
34	December 30	H	Kansas City Steers	L	81-91	12-22	2,036	Honolulu Civic Auditorium

=== January ===
Record: 6-8 (first half 2-5); Home: 6-4 (first half 2-3); Road: 0-3 (first half 0-1); Neutral: 0-1 (first half 0-1)

#	Date	H/A/N	Opponent	W/L	Score	Record	Attendance	Site
35	January 1	H	Pittsburgh Rens	L	87-106	12-23	1,654	Honolulu Civic Auditorium
36	January 2	H	Pittsburgh Rens	L	92-98	12-24	1,248	Honolulu Civic Auditorium
37	January 4	H	Pittsburgh Rens	L	101-104	12-25	1,445	Conroy Bowl
38	January 5	H	Pittsburgh Rens	W	107-105	13-25	2,083	Honolulu Civic Auditorium
39	January 6	H	Pittsburgh Rens	W	95-83	13-26	2,143	Honolulu Civic Auditorium
40	January 9	A	Los Angeles Jets	L	103-140	13-27	2,741	Olympic Auditorium
41	January 10	N	Los Angeles Jets	L	122-123	13-28	2,684	Cow Palace

SECOND HALF
Record second half: 4-3; Home second half: 4-1; Road second half: 0-3; Neutral second half: 0-0

#	Date	H/A/N	Opponent	W/L	Score	Record	Attendance	Site
42	January 15	A	San Francisco Saints	L	95-110	0-1	2,187	Civic Auditorium
43	January 17	A	San Francisco Saints	L	92-109	0-2	3,011	Civic Auditorium
44	January 23	H	Cleveland Pipers	W	106-100	1-2	2,819	Honolulu Civic Auditorium
45	January 25	H	Cleveland Pipers	L	113-114	1-3	1,940	Bloch Arena
46	January 26	H	Cleveland Pipers	W	121-114	2-3	3,339	Honolulu Civic Auditorium
47	January 27	H	Cleveland Pipers	W	106-94	3-3	3,531	Honolulu Civic Auditorium
48	January 30	H	Kansas City Steers	L	81-84	3-4	3,137	Honolulu Civic Auditorium

=== February ===
Record: 8-11; Home: 4-4; Road: 1-4; Neutral: 3-3

#	Date	H/A/N	Opponent	W/L	Score	Record	Attendance	Site
49	February 1	H	Kansas City Steers	L	91-92	3-5	2,200	Conroy Bowl
50	February 2	H	Kansas City Steers	W	111-87	4-5	3,656	Honolulu Civic Auditorium
51	February 3	H	Kansas City Steers	W	100-91	5-5	3,848	Honolulu Civic Auditorium
52	February 4	N	Kansas City Steers	L	92-105	5-6	7,857	Los Angeles Memorial Sports Arena
53	February 6	N	Kansas City Steers	W	88-85	5-7	4,200	California Western University Gym
54	February 9	A	Kansas City Steers	L	94-113	5-8	3,584	Municipal Auditorium
55	February 11	A	Kansas City Steers	L	88-91	5-9	2,163	Municipal Auditorium
56	February 12	A	Cleveland Pipers	W	137-136 2OT	6-9	6,090	Cleveland Arena
57	February 14	N	Cleveland Pipers	L	103-115	6-10	1,240	New Castle Junior/Senior High School
58	February 15	N	Cleveland Pipers	L	108-112	6-11	3,784	Pittsburgh Civic Auditorium
59	February 17	N	New York Tapers	L	85-101	6-12	5,700	Oklahoma City Municipal Auditorium
60	February 18	N	New York Tapers	W	105-103	7-12	5,000	Fairgrounds Pavilion
61	February 19	A	Pittsburgh Rens	L	97-109	7-13	3,989	Pittsburgh Civic Auditorium
62	February 20	A	Pittsburgh Rens	L	90-104	7-14	3,145	Pittsburgh Civic Auditorium
63	February 23	H	Chicago Majors	L	123-125 OT	7-15	1,171	Honolulu Civic Auditorium
64	February 24	H	Chicago Majors	L	99-106	7-16	2,307	Honolulu Civic Auditorium
65	February 25	H	Chicago Majors	W	110-84	8-16	1,171	Honolulu Civic Auditorium
66	February 26	H	Chicago Majors	L	77-97	8-17	1,553	Hilo Civic Auditorium
67	February 27	H	Chicago Majors	W	95-94	9-17	1,447	Honolulu Civic Auditorium

=== March ===
Record: 7-7; Home: 5-0; Road: 1-4; Neutral: 1-3

#	Date	H/A/N	Opponent	W/L	Score	Record	Attendance	Site
68	March 2	H	San Francisco Saints	W	92-87	10-17	2,835	Honolulu Civic Auditorium
69	March 3	H	San Francisco Saints	W	114-104	11-17	2,935	Honolulu Civic Auditorium
70	March 4	H	San Francisco Saints	W	110-102	12-17	1,750	Honolulu Civic Auditorium
71	March 5	H	San Francisco Saints	W	109-99	13-17	2,135	Honolulu Civic Auditorium
72	March 6	H	San Francisco Saints	W	122-97	14-17	3,966	Honolulu Civic Auditorium
73	March 9	N	Chicago Majors	L	92-104	14-17	7,592	Miami Beach Convention Center
74	March 10	N	Chicago Majors	W	110-95	15-17	7,657	Miami Beach Convention Center
75	March 11	N	Chicago Majors	L	95-111	15-18	6,013	Jacksonville Coliseum
76	March 12	N	Chicago Majors	L	93-113	15-19	4,794	Jacksonville Coliseum
77	March 13	A	New York Tapers	L	98-102	15-20	200	Long Island Arena
78	March 14	A	New York Tapers	W	110-95	16-21		Long Island Arena
79	March 17	A	Cleveland Pipers	L	100-107	16-22		Public Hall
80	March 19	A	Chicago Majors	L	108-112	16-23	3,128	Chicago Stadium
81	March 20	A	San Francisco Saints	L	111-119	16-24	3,245	Civic Auditorium
82	March 22	A	San Francisco Saints	L	102-113	16-25	3,258	Civic Auditorium

ABL SECOND HALF PRELIMINARY ROUND PLAYOFFS

Date	H/A/N	Opponent	W/L	Score	Attendance	Site
March 29	N	New York Tapers	L	116-125 OT	3,453	Civic Arena

== Game log 1962-63 Long Beach ==
=== November ===
Record: 9-0; Home: 6-0; Road: 1-0; Neutral: 2-0

#	Date	H/A/N	Opponent	W/L	Score	Record	Attendance	Site
1	November 17	H	Kansas City Steers	W	105-96	1-0	2,294	Long Beach Arena
2	November 18	H	Kansas City Steers	W	103-74	2-0	1,078	Long Beach Arena
3	November 20	H	Kansas City Steers	W	93-89	3-0	1,734	Long Beach Arena
4	November 21	H	Oakland Oaks	W	89-87	4-0	1,453	Long Beach Arena
5	November 22	H	Oakland Oaks	W	106-98	5-0	1,821	Long Beach Arena
6	November 25	H	Oakland Oaks	W	104-83	6-0	1,717	Long Beach Arena
7	November 28	N	Chicago Majors	W	96-87	7-0	6,829	Maple Leaf Gardens
8	November 29	N	Chicago Majors	W	103-74	8-0	5,000	Rochester Community War Memorial
9	November 30	A	Chicago Majors	W	118-99	9-0	3,847	Chicago Stadium

=== December ===
Record: 7-8; Home: 5-2; Road: 2-7; Neutral: 1-2

#	Date	H/A/N	Opponent	W/L	Score	Record	Attendance	Site
10	December 1	A	Philadelphia Tapers	W	93-86	10-0	3,479	Convention Hall
11	December 2	A	Pittsburgh Rens	L	108-116	10-1	4,774	Civic Arena
12	December 4	A	Pittsburgh Rens	W	120-100	11-1	1,679	Civic Arena
13	December 5	A	Kansas City Steers	L	91-112	11-2	2,587	Memorial Hall
14	December 7	A	Kansas City Steers	L	90-113	11-3	2,887	Memorial Hall
15	December 8	H	Pittsburgh Rens	L	103-111	11-4	3,512	Long Beach Arena
16	December 9	H	Pittsburgh Rens	W	109-107	12-4	682	Long Beach Arena
17	December 11	H	Philadelphia Tapers	L	102-106	12-5	1,088	Long Beach Arena
18	December 12	H	Philadelphia Tapers	W	99-89	13-5	704	Long Beach Arena
19	December 13	H	Philadelphia Tapers	W	94-90	14-5	764	Long Beach Arena
20	December 15	A	Kansas City Steers	L	89-110	14-6	2,582	Municipal Auditorium
21	December 16	A	Kansas City Steers	L	88-112	14-7	1,842	Municipal Auditorium
22	December 27	A	Oakland Oaks	L	92-97	14-8	3,448	Oakland Civic Auditorium
23	December 29	H	Oakland Oaks	W	124-111	15-8	2,141	Long Beach Arena
24	December 30	H	Oakland Oaks	W	104-100	16-8	1,003	Long Beach Arena
