= Cleveland Pipers =

American basketball team

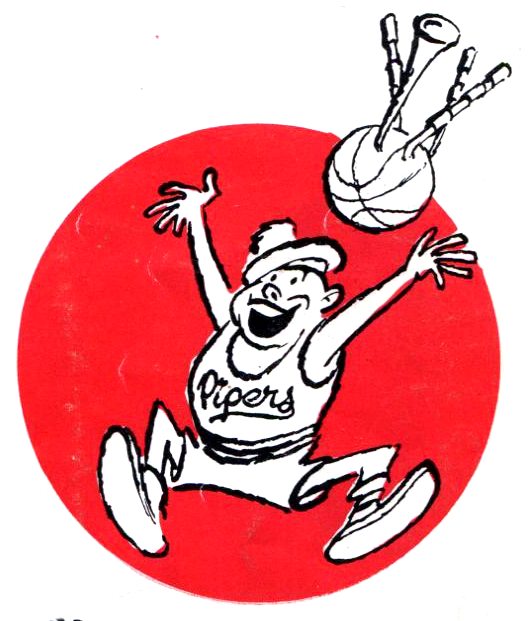
- Leagues: NIBL 1959–1961; ABL 1961–1962
- Founded: 1950s
- Folded: 1962
- Arena: Cleveland Arena
- Team colors: Red, white and blue

The Cleveland Pipers were an American industrial basketball team based in Cleveland, Ohio, in the 1950s and early 1960s. The Pipers are mostly known for having played in the short-lived American Basketball League (1961–1962). They were also a power in the day's Amateur Athletic Union (AAU) basketball and the National Industrial Basketball League (NIBL) which peaked in the late 1950s and early 1960s.

== History ==
The team was first owned and run by Ed Sweeny, a shareholder in a company which handled plumbing, heating and air conditioning services for a number of companies and buildings in Cleveland. Sweeny handled sponsorship for a number of Cleveland recreational sports teams and leagues, including what became Cleveland Pipers. The team was purchased by the ambitious young George Steinbrenner, then a 30-year-old son of a Cleveland trading company owner, as his first entry into pro sports ownership. The team's precarious financial situation was such that its home games took place in eight different arenas and gyms. These ranged from the team's primary homes at either Cleveland Public Hall or the Cleveland Arena, to local colleges such as Baldwin-Wallace College in Berea, Ohio, to high school facilities in Ohio: Ashtabula, Lorain and Sandusky, and as far south as Columbus.

General Manager Mike Cleary later hired John McLendon, the first African American head coach in professional basketball, to lead the squad. Upon his hiring, McClendon was able to convince a former college player he had coached, Dick Barnett, to relocate from the NBA's Syracuse Nationals to the Pipers. After the team's first season, Steinbrenner signed Ohio State University All-American Jerry Lucas. In the latter case, the signing enraged the rival National Basketball Association (NBA), which attempted to lure Steinbrenner and the Pipers into changing leagues. Under McLendon, and later coach Bill Sharman, the team won the league's 1961–62 championship, the only full-season title in the league's short history.

Steinbrenner was considered meddlesome and irrepressible. Basketball lore indicates that at the November 22, 1961 game against the Hawaii Chiefs, he sold player Grady McCollum to the Chiefs at halftime. Mounting debts and costs of that move proved too much for Steinbrenner, who folded the team just months later.

== Industrial league ==
The team sponsored by Ed Sweeny Co started in the Industrial A League. Opponents included Cleveland Twist Drill, East Ohio Gas and White Motors in this small eight-team division.

AAU and industrial basketball were popular in Cleveland then, as the city was not a college basketball hotbed, and professional basketball, such as the then-struggling NBA, was not yet strong in the city. The city's various sponsored industrial teams and local high school action therefore dominated then.

In 1958, the Sweeny Pipers won their league and they were then invited to join the nine-team Greater Cleveland Muny League, the top league in the city, for the 1958–59 season. Opponents included Bruscino Construction, Carney Auditors, Blepp-Coombs, and Cotton Club Beverage. The Sweeny team went 28–0 to win the league in 1959.

The team had strong local connections, with Cleary, coach Tom Nolan (a former star player at Cleveland area John Carroll University), and guard John Hollis. Their first big star was 6 ft 6 in (1.98 m) Cornelius "Corney" Freeman, a former top scorer on Xavier University's 1957 National Invitational Tournament (NIT) team.

Sweeny also hosted several national industrial powers during the 58–59 season including Wichita Vickers, Akron Goodyear and the Seattle Buchan Bakers. His Pipers lost them all, a briefly discouraging fact. That Spring, with the college basketball season concluding, a number of college players were immediately available to be signed by industrial teams, which was common then. Sweeny signed several including future New York Knick Johnny Green and Kansas State All-American Bob Boozer. He also signed Tennessee State small college champion coach McLendon to lead the Pipers and his star Dick Barnett. On April 5, 1959, this revamped Pipers team hosted the Denver-Chicago Truckers at Cleveland Arena and won the game. The Truckers, like the above mentioned industrial teams, were part of the NIBL, and the Pipers were soon asked to join that circuit as their eighth team for the 1959–60 season.

== NIBL/AAU ==
The Ed Sweeny Cleveland Pipers went 16–16 in the 1959–60 NIBL campaign, which was won again by the league's long-running power, the Phillips 66ers of Bartlesville, OK. They also hosted and played in a number of exhibitions including a visiting Soviet Union team, The U.S. Pan American Games team, and the Saint Bonaventure University college team. New stars included Kentucky's Johnny Cox, 6'9" Gene Tormohlen, and Tennessee Staters John Barnhill and Ben Warley. All later played in the NBA. They were edged 84–82 by eventual AAU champion Peoria, and their signee Boozer, and finished the season in a sea of debt. Sweeny allowed Steinbrenner to take over the team in April, 1960. Steinbrenner had been a longtime AAU backer.

For the NIBL 1960–61 campaign, Steinbrenner's first big signing was Dan Swartz, the NIBL's leading scorer from Wichita. The Pipers went 24-10 in the now six-team league to win the NIBL title, the league's last. They then also won the 1961 AAU national tournament in Denver.

== ABL ==
The American Basketball League played one full season, 1961–1962, and part of the next season until the league folded on December 31, 1962. The ABL was the first basketball league to have a three point shot for baskets scored far away from the goal. Other rules that set the league apart were a 30-second shooting clock and a wider free throw lane, 18 feet instead of the standard 12.

The American Basketball League was formed when Abe Saperstein did not get the Los Angeles National Basketball Association (NBA) franchise he sought. His Harlem Globetrotters had strong NBA ties. When Minneapolis Lakers owner Bob Short was permitted to move the Lakers to Los Angeles, Saperstein reacted by convincing National Alliance of Basketball Leagues (NABL) team owner Paul Cohen (Tuck Tapers) and Amateur Athletic Union (AAU) National Champion Cleveland Pipers owner George Steinbrenner to take the top NABL and AAU teams and players and form a rival league.

League franchises were: the Chicago Majors (1961–1963); Cleveland Pipers (1961–1962); Kansas City Steers (1961–63); Long Beach Chiefs (1961–1963), as Hawaii Chiefs in 1961–62; Los Angeles Jets (1961–62, disbanded during season); Oakland Oaks (1961–1963, as San Francisco Saints in 1961–1962; Philadelphia Tapers 1961–1963, as Washington Tapers in 1961–62; moved to New York during 1961–62 season; as New York Tapers in 1961–62 and the Pittsburgh Rens (1961–1963).

On March 27, 1961, the Pipers announced that they would be joining the American Basketball League that would begin play that fall, with former Ohio State basketball star Jimmy Hull, a friend of Steinbrenner's joining the team two days later as a major stockholder in the franchise.

The Pipers had played their previous two years at the Cleveland Arena, but sought a new home to reduce the $750 per game cost to rent the facility. They signed an agreement with the city of Cleveland to play 27 games at Public Hall at $400 per game or 15 percent of the gross receipts. However, in early August 1961, Cleveland mayor Anthony Celebrezze asked to renegotiate the deal, asking for the same $750 per game that the Pipers had paid at the Arena. Steinbrenner refused and threatened to move the team to Columbus.

On September 14, Ben Flieger of the Cleveland Press was named the team's new general manager. He replaced Cleary, who had left the position for the rival Kansas City Steers.

== The Barnett Affair ==
Prior to the start of the facility controversy continued, McClendon signed his former Tennessee State star, Dick Barnett, on August 16 to a one-year contract for $13,000. Barnett had completed his second year with the NBA's Syracuse Nationals and had been offered a new contract worth $11,500 for the season, but his signing led to another legal dispute. On September 25, the same day that the Pipers began their preseason training camp, the Nationals announced plans to file a temporary restraining order to prevent Barnett from playing for the Pipers.

Syracuse cited the fact that the contract gave the team the legal option to maintain Barnett's rights, while Cleveland's legal team focused on the case of another ABL player, Kenny Sears. He had played for the Los Angeles Lakers of the NBA, but then signed a deal to play for the ABL's San Francisco Saints. The Nationals obtained that temporary restraining order on October 23, less than two weeks before the start of the regular season.

The situation remained unresolved for the next two months, with Barnett unable to either play or practice with the Pipers. Eventually, the Nationals won a permanent injunction, but agreed to release Barnett from their deal after a handshake agreement between Steinbrenner and Syracuse general manager Dick Biasone.

== Jerry Lucas ==
After a strong recruiting pitch that lasted for more than a month, Steinbrenner officially signed Ohio State University All-American Jerry Lucas to a player-management contract on May 16, 1962. Lucas announced the signing in a bylined article in Sports Illustrated. His two-year deal was to pay him a yearly salary of $10,000 with another $40,000 part of an investment portfolio.

At the time of the signing, Lucas indicated that while the Pipers' offer amounted to less than the three-year deal worth $100,000 that was offered by the NBA's Cincinnati Royals, it addressed his interest in finishing work on his degree at Ohio State and his intent to attend graduate school. In addition, a portion of the investments had indicated that they would be willing to hire him once his basketball career had ended.

According to Bill Madden's Steinbrenner: The Last Lion of Baseball, Steinbrenner made plans in 1963 to acquire the Kansas City Steers, from the recently failed ABL, as part of an application to bring the Cleveland Pipers into the NBA, and a schedule had, supposedly, been printed for the 1963-64 NBA season with the Pipers playing the New York Knicks in the first game. Steinbrenner and partner George McKean fell behind in payments to the NBA and the deal was cancelled.

== NBA petition ==
After Steinbrenner unsuccessfully petitioned to get the National Basketball Association to accept his team the following year, the Pipers disbanded. After the ABL folded, Steinbrenner had $125,000 in debts and personal losses of $2 million.

== Notable alumni ==
Lucas did not play in any ABL games. Pipers players include the following:

- Jack Adams
- Willie Akers
- Jack Allain
- Dick Barnett - 1961-1962
- John Barnhill - 1960-1962
- Richard Brott
- Johnny Cox - 1960, 1961–62
- Jimmy Darrow
- Archie Dees
- Connie Dierking - 1961-62
- Clarence "Bevo" Francis
- James Guydon
- Ron Hamilton
- Max Jameson
- Rossie Johnson
- Bob Keller
- Lowery Kirk
- Grady McCollum
- Jim McCoy
- David Romanoff
- Lloyd Sharrar
- Larry Siegfried - 1961-62
- Dan Swartz - 1961
- Roger Taylor
- Gene Tormohlen - 1959-1960
- Ben Warley - 1960-1962

=== Basketball Hall of Famers ===
Cleveland Pipers Hall of Famers
Players
No.	Name	Position	Tenure	Inducted
5/12	Dick Barnett	SG	1961–1962	2024
Coaches
Name		Position	Tenure	Inducted
Bill Sharman		Head coach	1962	2004
John McLendon		Head coach	1959–1962	2007

== Year-by-year ==
Year	League	Reg. season	Playoffs
1961/62	ABL	1st, Eastern	Champion

== Game log ==
FIRST HALF

=== November ===
Record: 10-5; Home: 5-1; Road: 4-4; Neutral: 1-1

#	Date	H/A/N	Opponent	W/L	Score	Record	Attendance	Site
1	November 5	A	Pittsburgh Rens	L	82-87	0-1	6,236	Civic Arena
2	November 6	A	Kansas City Steers	W	110-106	1-1	3,107	Municipal Auditorium
3	November 8	A	Kansas City Steers	L	100-101	1-2	1,035	Municipal Auditorium
4	November 9	A	San Francisco Saints	W	103-100	2-2	6,744	Cow Palace
5	November 10	A	San Francisco Saints	W	97-88	3-2	7,192	Cow Palace
6	November 13	A	Los Angeles Jets	L	99-108	3-3	3,176	Olympic Auditorium
7	November 14	A	Los Angeles Jets	L	90-106	3-4	2,630	Olympic Auditorium
8	November 17	A	Pittsburgh Rens	W	111-94	4-4	3,437	Civic Arena
9	November 18	N	Pittsburgh Rens	W	88-87	5-4	1,775	Washington Coliseum
10	November 21	H	Hawaii Chiefs	W	91-74	6-4	3,318	Public Hall
11	November 22	H	Hawaii Chiefs	W	97-96	7-4	3,569	Public Hall
12	November 25	H	Pittsburgh Rens	L	91-97	7-5	2,843	Public Hall
13	November 26	H	Pittsburgh Rens	W	137-94	8-5	7,000 (EST)	Cleveland Arena
14	November 28	H	Kansas City Steers	W	99-97	9-5	2,215	Public Hall
15	November 30	H	Kansas City Steers	W	109-102	10-5	1,200 (EST)	Public Hall

=== December ===
Record: 9-12; Home: 5-4; Road: 3-5; Neutral: 1-3

#	Date	H/A/N	Opponent	W/L	Score	Record	Attendance	Site
16	December 1	H	Los Angeles Jets	W	113-92	11-5	2,201	Columbus Fairgrounds Coliseum
17	December 2	H	Los Angeles Jets	L	109-116	11-6	3,254	Public Hall
18	December 5	N	Chicago Majors	L	97-110	11-7	2,300 (EST)	Milwaukee Arena
19	December 6	A	Chicago Majors	L	93-101	11-8	2.678	Cleveland Arena
20	December 7	N	Chicago Majors	W	107-88	12-8	2,432	Civic Arena
21	December 9	H	Pittsburgh Rens	L	113-134	12-9	300 (EST)	Rudolph Ursprung Gymnasium Baldwin Wallace College
22	December 10	A	Pittsburgh Rens	W	107-102	13-9	6,213	Civic Auditorium
23	December 13	H	Chicago Majors	W	117-95	14-9	2,500 (EST)	Cleveland Arena
24	December 14	N	Kansas City Steers	L	104-112	14-10	3,692	Civic Arena
25	December 15	A	Washington Tapers	L	100-108	14-11		Washington Coliseum
26	December 16	A	Washington Tapers	W	99-84	15-11	5,745	Washington Coliseum
27	December 17	N	Washington Tapers	L	88-90	15-12	6,293	Civic Arena
28	December 19	A	Chicago Majors	W	99-94	16-12	900 (EST)	at Rockford, IL (Boylan Catholic High School)
29	December 20	A	Chicago Majors	L	94-98	16-13	1,872	Chicago Stadium
30	December 21	H	Chicago Majors	L	112-113	16-14	3,453	Cleveland Arena
31	December 23	H	Pittsburgh Rens	W	132-117	17-14	3,218	Public Hall
32	December 25	H	Pittsburgh Rens	L	106-108	17-15	2,315	Cleveland Arena
33	December 26	A	Washington Tapers	L	108-109	17-16	1,110	Washington Coliseum
34	December 28	A	Washington Tapers	L	106-123	17-17	1,197	Washington Coliseum
35	December 29	H	Washington Tapers	W	124-98	18-17	3,518	Public Hall
36	December 30	H	Washington Tapers	W	118-104	19-17	7,218	Public Hall

=== January ===
Record: 7-8; Home: 4-2; Road: 2-5; Neutral: 1-1

#	Date	H/A/N	Opponent	W/L	Score	Record	Attendance	Site
37	January 1	N	Chicago Majors	W	117-99	20-17	1,600 (EST)	Memorial Hall (University of Akron)
38	January 3	H	Chicago Majors	W	114-104	21-17	2,338	Public Hall
39	January 6	H	San Francisco Saints	L	93-103	21-18	4,220	Public Hall
40	January 7	N	San Francisco Saints	W	140-107	22-18	1,238	Columbus Fairgrounds Coliseum
41	January 9	H	New York Tapers	W	141-124	23-18	2,114	Admiral King High School
42	January 10	N	vs. Kansas City Steers	W	115-110 (OT)	24-18	2,223	Chicago Stadium

ABL FIRST HALF PLAYOFFS

Date	H/A/N	Opponent	W/L	Score	Attendance	Site
January 12	A	Kansas City Steers	L	93-106	5,286	Municipal Auditorium
January 13	H	Kansas City Steers	W	98-87	4,276	Public Hall
January 14	A	Kansas City Steers	L	120-104	2,313	Municipal Auditorium

SECOND HALF

#	Date	H/A/N	Opponent	W/L	Score	Record	Attendance	Site
43	January 15	A	Pittsburgh Rens	W	110-108	1-0	3,482	Civic Arena
44	January 16	N	vs. Kansas City Steers	L	110-118	1-1	1,600 (EST)	Long Island Arena
45	January 17	H	Pittsburgh Rens	L	97-107	1-2	2,143	Cleveland Arena
46	January 20	A	Kansas City Steers	L	114-115	1-3	3,018	Municipal Auditorium
47	January 21	A	Kansas City Steers	L	120-132	1-4	2,296	Municipal Auditorium
48	January 23	A	Hawaii Chiefs	L	100-106	1-5	2,819	Civic Auditorium
49	January 25	A	Hawaii Chiefs	W	114-113	2-5	1,940	Bloch Arena
50	January 26	A	Hawaii Chiefs	L	114-121	2-6	3,339	Civic Auditorium
51	January 27	A	Hawaii Chiefs	L	94-106	2-7	3,531	Civic Auditorium

=== February ===
Record: 9-6; Home: 5-3; Road: 1-3; Neutral: 3-0

#	Date	H/A/N	Opponent	W/L	Score	Record	Attendance	Site
52	February 3	H	Chicago Majors	W	120-114	3-7	2,338	Public Hall
53	February 4	H	New York Tapers	L	109-112	3-8	1,523	Public Hall
54	February 6	H	San Francisco Saints	L	123-126	3-9	1,750	Sandusky High School
55	February 7	H	San Francisco Saints	W	144-115	4-9	1,738	Public Hall
56	February 8	N	vs. San Francisco Saints	W	129-118	5-9	3,917	Civic Arena
57	February 10	H	Pittsburgh Rens	W	125-114	6-9	1,911	Public Hall
58	February 11	A	Pittsburgh Rens	W	105-103	7-9	3,875	Civic Arena
59	February 12	H	Hawaii Chiefs	L	136-137 (2 OT)	7-10	6,090	Cleveland Arena
60	February 14	N	Hawaii Chiefs	W	115-103	8-10	1,240	New Castle High School
61	February 15	N	Hawaii Chiefs	W	112-108	9-10	3,784	Civic Arena
62	February 17	A	Chicago Majors	L	106-115	9-11	3,115	Chicago Stadium
63	February 23	H	New York Tapers	W	138-121	10-11	3,417	Cleveland Arena
64	February 25	H	Kansas City Steers	W	111-109	11-11	2,048	Cleveland Arena
65	February 27	A	New York Tapers	L	90-101	11-12	2,369	Long Island Arena
66	February 28	A	New York Tapers	L	86-102	11-13	1,353	Long Island Arena

=== March ===
Record: 10-5; Home: 8-0; Road: 1-4; Neutral: 1-1

#	Date	H/A/N	Opponent	W/L	Score	Record	Attendance	Site
67	March 3	A	Chicago Majors	L	111-115	11-14	5,228	Chicago Stadium
68	March 5	H	Kansas City Steers	W	104-92	12-14	1,396	Canton Memorial Civic Center
69	March 7	A	San Francisco Saints	L	101-103	12-15	1,142	Civic Auditorium
70	March 8	A	San Francisco Saints	W	100-98	13-15	853	Civic Auditorium
71	March 9	A	San Francisco Saints	L	104-106 (OT)	13-16	1,140	Civic Auditorium
72	March 13	H	Chicago Majors	W	110-101	14-16	1,300 (EST)	Ashtabula High School
73	March 14	H	Chicago Majors	W	124-122	15-16	2,310	Public Hall
74	March 15	H	Kansas City Steers	W	116-101	16-16	1,519	Public Hall
75	March 17	H	Hawaii Chiefs	W	107-100	17-16		Public Hall
76	March 18	H	Chicago Majors	W	111-102	18-16	3,215	Public Hall
77	March 21	H	Pittsburgh Rens	W	124-102	19-16	2,338	Cleveland Arena
78	March 22	N	New York Tapers	L	98-100	19-17	3,943	Civic Arena
79	March 23	A	Pittsburgh Rens	L	124-135	19-18	5,153	Civic Arena
80	March 24	H	Pittsburgh Rens	W	136-126	20-18	975 (EST)	Cleveland Arena
81	March 25	N	Pittsburgh Rens	W	114-106	21-18	3,441	War Memorial

ABL QUARTERFINALS

Date	H/A/N	Opponent	W/L	Score	Attendance	Site
March 30	H	San Francisco Saints	W	124-102	1,500 (EST)	Cleveland Arena
March 31	N	vs. New York Tapers	W	98-100	300	Municipal Auditorium

ABL FINALS

Date	H/A/N	Opponent	W/L	Score	Attendance	Site
April 1	A	Kansas City Steers	L	101-126	3,246	Municipal Auditorium
April 3	A	Kansas City Steers	L	118-82	4,101	Municipal Auditorium
April 4	H	Kansas City Steers	W	130-114	7,624	Cleveland Arena
April 7	H	Kansas City Steers	W	100-98	4,115	Cleveland Arena
April 9	A	Kansas City Steers	W	106-102	3,000 (EST)	Mason-Halprin Field House, Rockhurst College
