= Kansas City Steers =

- Leagues: American Basketball League (1961–1962)
- Founded: 1961
- Folded: 1963
- Arena: Municipal Auditorium; Memorial Hall
- Team colors: Red and White

The Kansas City Steers were an American basketball team based in Kansas City, Missouri from 1961 to 1963. They were a member of the American Basketball League.

== History ==
The American Basketball League played one full season, 1961–1962, and part of the next season until the league folded on December 31, 1962. The ABL was the first basketball league to have a three point shot for baskets scored far away from the goal. Other rules that set the league apart were a 30-second shooting clock and a wider free throw lane, 18 feet instead of the standard 12.

The American Basketball League was formed when Abe Saperstein did not get the Los Angeles National Basketball Association (NBA) franchise he sought. His Harlem Globetrotters had strong NBA ties. When Minneapolis Lakers owner Bob Short was permitted to move the Lakers to Los Angeles, Saperstein reacted by convincing National Alliance of Basketball Leagues (NABL) team owner Paul Cohen (Tuck Tapers) and Amateur Athletic Union (AAU) National Champion Cleveland Pipers owner George Steinbrenner to take the top NABL and AAU teams and players and form a rival league.

League franchises were: the Chicago Majors (1961–1963); Cleveland Pipers (1961–1962); Kansas City Steers (1961–63); Long Beach Chiefs (1961–1963), as Hawaii Chiefs in 1961–62; Los Angeles Jets (1961–62, disbanded during season); Oakland Oaks (1961–1963, as San Francisco Saints in 1961–1962; Philadelphia Tapers 1961–1963, as Washington Tapers in 1961–62; moved to New York during 1961–62 season; as New York Tapers in 1961-62 and the Pittsburgh Rens (1961–1963).

In their first season, 1961–1962, the Steers were (54–25) under Coach Jack McMahon and were owned by Kenneth A. Krueger. They lost in the Finals to the Cleveland Pipers who were coached by John McLendon. After winning the first two games at Municipal, they lost the next two in Cleveland. The Steers then lost in the Final game at Rockhurst University (Municipal Auditorium was booked) 106–102.

In their final season, 1962–1963, their General Manager was Mike Cleary (for whom John Carroll University's Sports Studies Program is named), who had left George Steinbrenner's Cleveland Pipers the year before. When the ABL folded, 5 Kansas City Steers basketball players, including Bill Bridges and Larry Staverman, transitioned to the NBA.

The Steers folded along with the ABL on December 31, 1962. They were declared to be the ABL Champions based on their 22–9 record under Coach John Dee.

== The arena ==
The Steers played in Municipal Auditorium and Memorial Hall. Historic Municipal Auditorium is still in use today. The address is 301 West 13th Street, Kansas City, Missouri. Memorial Hall is also still in use and is located at 600 North 7th Street Kansas City, Kansas 66101.

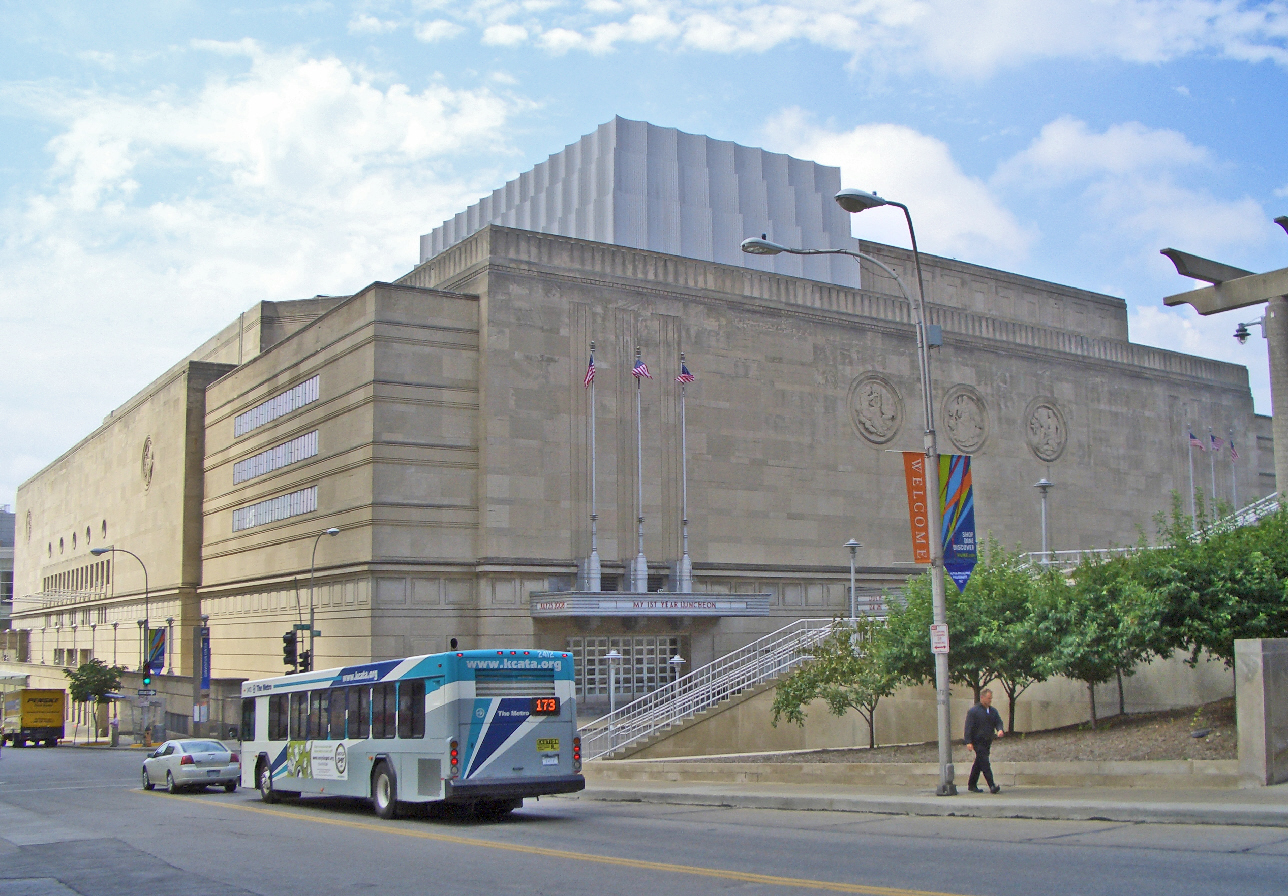
Municipal Auditorium, Kansas City, Missouri

== Media Coverage ==
The Steers were covered on radio both seasons by WDAF with Monte Moore announcing in 1961-62, and Merle Harmon in the abbreviated 1962-63 season. All home games and weekend away games saw coverage the first season, with all games the second.

== Notable alumni ==
- Bill Bridges
- Larry Comley
- Maurice King
- Nick Mantis
- George Patterson
- Larry Staverman
- Bumper Tormohlen
- Win Wilfong
- John Windsor

== Year-by-year ==
| Year | League | Reg. season | Playoffs |
|---|---|---|---|
| 1961/62 | ABL | 1st, Western | Finals |
| 1962/63 | ABL | 1st | Champion (no playoff) |

== See also ==
- Category:Kansas City Steers players
