= Luxembourg Women's Volleyball League =

Novotel Ligue 1 Women's Volleyball
- Current season, competition or edition: 2022–23
- Sport: Volleyball
- Founded: 1958
- First season: 1958
- No. of teams: 8 Teams
- Country: Luxembourg
- Continent: Europe
- Domestic cups: Luxembourg Cup; Luxembourg Super Cup
- International cups: CEV Champions League; CEV Cup; CEV Challenge Cup

The Luxembourg Women's Volleyball Championship or ( Novotel Ligue 1 Women's Volleyball ) for sponsorship reasons is an annual competition for women's volleyball teams in Luxembourg. It has been held since 1958. Competitions are held in three divisions - National League, Division 1 and Division 2. The championships are organized by the Luxembourg Volleyball Federation.

== Competition formula (National League) ==
The National League championship is played in two stages - preliminary and playoffs. In the preliminary stage the teams play in two rounds. According to the results 4 teams qualify for the playoffs and by elimination system determine the two finalists, who play for the championship. Series of matches are played until two victories of one of the opponents. For victories 3-0 and 3-1 teams get 3 points, for victories 3-2 - 2 points, for defeat 2-3 - 1 point, for defeat 0-3 and 1-3 no points are awarded. There were eight teams in the 2021/22 National League Championship: "Valfer" (Valferdange), "GIM Volley Bonnvois" (Luxembourg), "Mamer", "Steinfort", "Petange", "Bertrange", "Diekirch", "Fentange". Walpher won the championship title by defeating GIM Walleye Bonnvois 2-0 (3-1, 3–0) in the final series. Third place went to Steinfort.

== List of winners ==
Season	Champion
1958	CAL Clausen
1959	CAL Clausen
1960	CAL Clausen
1961	CAL Clausen
1962	Laleng Volley
1963	Laleng Volley
1964	Laleng Volley
1965	Laleng Volley
1966	CAL Clausen
1967	CAL Clausen
1968	Laleng Volley
1969	CAL Clausen
1970	CAL Clausen
1971	Laleng Volley
1972	CAL Clausen
1973	CAL Clausen
1974	CAL Clausen
1975	Olympic Lussembourg
1976	CAL Clausen
1977	CAL Clausen
1978	CAL Clausen
1979	Olympic Lussembourg
1980	CAL Clausen

Season	Champion
1981	CAL Clausen
1982	Olympic Lussembourg
1983	CS GYM Volley
1984	Olympic Lussembourg
1985	Olympic Lussembourg
1986	Olympic Lussembourg
1987	Olympic Lussembourg
1988	CS GYM Volley
1989	Olympic Lussembourg
1990	CS GYM Volley
1991	CS GYM Volley
1992	CS GYM Volley
1993	CS GYM Volley
1994	VC Mamer
1995	VC Mamer
1996	VC Mamer
1997	VC Mamer
1998	CS GYM Volley
1999	VC Mamer
2000	VC Mamer
2001	VC Mamer
2002	VC Mamer
2003	VC Mamer

Season	Champion
2004	Volley 80 Pétange
2005	Volley 80 Pétange
2006	Volley 80 Pétange
2007	VC Mamer
2008	Volley 80 Pétange
2009	Volley 80 Pétange
2010	CS GYM Volley
2011	RSR Walfer
2012	CS GYM Volley
2013	VC Mamer
2014	RSR Walfer
2015	RSR Walfer
2016	VC Mamer
2017	RSR Walfer
2018	RSR Walfer
2019	RSR Walfer
2020	Cancelled
2021	RSR Walfer
2022	RSR Walfer
2023	TBD
