= Bumper Tormohlen =

American basketball player and coach (1937–2018)

Personal information
- Born: May 12, 1937 Holland, Indiana, U.S.
- Died: December 27, 2018 (aged 81) Spring Hill, Tennessee, U.S.
- Listed height: 6 ft 8 in (2.03 m)
- Listed weight: 230 lb (104 kg)

Career information
- High school: Holland (Holland, Indiana)
- College: Tennessee (1956–1959)
- NBA draft: 1959: 2nd round, 11th overall pick
- Drafted by: Syracuse Nationals
- Playing career: 1961–1970
- Position: Power forward / center
- Number: 12, 34
- Coaching career: 1968–1982

Career history

Playing
- 1959–1961: Cleveland Pipers
- 1961–1963: Kansas City Steers
- 1963–1970: St. Louis / Atlanta Hawks

Coaching
- 1968–1976: Atlanta Hawks (assistant)
- 1976: Atlanta Hawks (interim)
- 1976–1982: Chicago Bulls (assistant)

Career highlights
- ABL champion (1963); AP honorable mention All-American (1959); 2× All-SEC (1958, 1959)

Career NBA statistics
- Points: 1,191 (4.4 ppg)
- Rebounds: 1,122 (4.1 rpg)
- Assists: 257 (0.9 apg)
- Stats at NBA.com
- Stats at Basketball Reference

Eugene R. "Bumper" Tormohlen (May 12, 1937 – December 27, 2018) was an American professional basketball player and coach. He played in the National Basketball Association (NBA) for a little over five seasons, as a reserve center on the St. Louis/Atlanta Hawks. He played college basketball with the University of Tennessee Volunteers, in the Southeastern Conference (SEC). He led the SEC in rebounds per game as a junior and senior, and was second as a sophomore. Tormohlen was twice-named first-team All-SEC, and was an honorable mention All-America as a senior. Over sixty-five years after finishing his college career, he still holds the Tennessee Volunteers' career records for rebounds per game and total rebounds. He had 50 double-doubles during his three years on the Volunteers' varsity, and averaged 15.5 points and 16.9 rebounds per game over those three years. Before joining the NBA, he played in the National Industrial Basketball League for 2½ seasons and was twice its most valuable player.

Tormohlen was an assistant coach for at least ten years in the NBA, and worked as an NBA scout for over 40 years. He was an assistant coach with the Atlanta Hawks from 1968 to 1976, working under head coaches Richie Guerin and Cotton Fitzsimmons (serving eight games as interim head coach at the end of the 1975–76 season after Fitzsimmons was fired). He was also the Hawks' head scout for all or part of that period. Tormohlen held the same positions with the Chicago Bulls for all or parts of the 1976–77 to 1982–1983 seasons, remaining through numerous head coaching transitions. He became a scout for the Los Angeles Lakers in 1983, working with the Lakers until 2011.

== Early life ==
Tormohlen was born on May 12, 1937, in Holland, Indiana, to Albert and Louise (Weitkamp) Tormohlen. He attended Holland High School (later consolidated into Southridge High School in Huntingburg, Indiana), graduating in 1955. Tormohlen was a three-year starter in basketball for the Holland High Dutchmen. He was reported to be 6 ft 4 in (1.93 m) as a junior (1954) and 6 ft 6½ in (1.94 m) or 6 ft 7 in (2 m) as a senior (1955). As of 2017, he was one of only four Holland High graduates to be on the honors banner at Huntingburg Memorial Gym.

As a sophomore, Tormohlen helped lead the Dutchmen to an IHSAA sectional title in 1953. In Tormohlen's senior year, Holland reached the sectional final championship game in February 1955, losing 55–50 to Huntingburg. Tormohlen was named to the all-tournament team. He had 24 points in the championship game. In the opening round of the 1955 sectional tournament, Tormohlen had 25 of his team's 59 points, leading the No. 12 ranked Holland over the No. 3 ranked Jasper High School; and in Holland's next tournament game win he had 24 of his team's 48 points. In the game against Jasper, Holland dribbled and drove 20 feet to the basket and dunked the ball, in one of the game's decisive and most exhilarating plays. It was the first dunk in the history of the county sectional tournament. Earlier in the 1955 season, he had dunked a ball with such force that it bent the rim and damaged the backboard, and the game had to be delayed while a replacement was installed.

== College career ==
In 1955, Tormohlen received a basketball scholarship to attend the University of Tennessee in Knoxville. Tennessee's head coach Emmett Lowery was born in Oakland City, Indiana, and had been a star basketball player at Indianapolis Tech High School and with the Purdue Boilermakers.

Tormohlen played center for the Tennessee Volunteers in the Southeastern Conference (SEC), and was a three-year starter on the varsity team. As a sophomore (1956–57), Tormohlen averaged 12.5 points and led the Vols with 16.2 rebounds per game. He was second in the SEC in rebounding average per game. As a junior, he averaged 16.2 points and 16.7 rebounds per game, leading the team in both categories, and leading the SEC in rebounding average. He was named first-team All-SEC that season. Both the Associated Press (AP) and United Press named Tormohlen first-team All-SEC.

As a senior (1958–59), Tormohlen averaged college career-highs of 17.8 points and 17.7 rebounds per game, leading Tennessee in both categories that season. He led the SEC in rebounding average as well, and was second in the nation in rebounding average that season. The AP named him first-team All-SEC for the second consecutive season, as did United Press International. The AP also named him an honorable mention for All-American. In April 1959, Tormohlen was named to Converse's second-team All-American team. In December 1958, he was named most valuable player in the Midwest Invititational Tournament.

Tormohlen's career 16.86 rebounds per game average ranks third all-time in SEC history, and first in Tennessee history (as of 2025–26). His 1,113 total rebounds ranks 13th all-time in SEC history and first in Tennessee history (as of 2025–26). Tormohlen's 17.7 rebounds per game average in 1958–59 remains Tennessee's all-time record for a season (as of 2025–26). He had 50 double-doubles during his college career, and averaged a double-double over his three-year Volunteers' career (15.5 points and 16.9 rebounds). He set numerous individual single game rebounding records at Tennessee. At the time of his death in 2018, Tormohlen had 24 of Tennessee's top-45 games in rebounding, with at least 20 rebounds in each of those games.

At Tennessee, Tormohlen was referred to as the "chairman of the boards" or "chairman of the backboards" because of his rebounding prowess.

== Professional career ==
=== National Industrial Basketball League and American Basketball League ===
Tormohlen was selected with the fifth pick in the second round of the 1959 NBA draft by the Syracuse Nationals. He instead chose to play as an amateur in the National Industrial Basketball League (NIBL). The NIBL offered players like Tormohlen the opportunity to work and begin a business career, while still playing basketball as amateurs on sponsored teams; playing in a 32-game season.

Tormohlen originally played with the Cleveland Sweeny Pipers in the 1959–60 season and with the Cleveland Pipers again in the 1960–61 season. He was twice the NIBL's most valuable player. The Pipers, originally sponsored by the Ed Sweeny Company in Cleveland, had joined the NIBL in May 1959. Tormohlen was among a number of prominent college seniors who chose to play in the NIBL rather than in the NBA that season. One of Tormohlen's Pipers' teammates in the starting lineup was his future NBA teammate John Barnhill. The Pipers were purchased in 1960 by George Steinbrenner, when the team was in a difficult financial position.

When Tormohlen joined the Pipers, the team was coached by John McClendon, who had learned basketball directly from James Naismith. McClendon has been called the first African American coach of a professional sports team; although the Pipers did not join a professional league (the American Basketball League) until 1961. The Pipers were national Amateur Athletic Union (AAU) champions during both of Tormohlen's seasons with the team, and NIBL champions in 1960–61. Before their 1960–61 season, the Pipers defeated the 1960 United States men's Olympic basketball team in an exhibition game, 101–96; the only defeat that team ever suffered. However, Tormohlen was unable to play in the game due to an ankle sprain.

In October 1961, the Pipers traded Turmohlen to the Kansas City Steers in the fledgling American Basketball League (ABL) for a 1962 draft choice and cash. Tormohlen was considered the ABL's fastest center, and was fourth in the league in rebounding in his first ABL season. He played in 76 games at forward and center, averaging 30.3 minutes, 12.5 points, and 10.6 rebounds per game; second only to Bill Bridges in rebounding on the team. The Steers were 54–25, and lost in the ABL championship series to the Cleveland Pipers (who had joined the ABL), three games to two.

The following season Tormohlen played with the Steers into late December 1962, until the ABL ceased operations on December 31, 1962. In 30 games, he averaged 37.1 minutes, 14.4 points, and 13.4 rebounds per game; again second only to Bridges in rebounding on the Steers. They played under coach Jack McMahon, of whom Tormohlen remained appreciative over the years for the considerable help McMahon gave Tormohlen while with the Steers. A few days after the ABL ceased operations, ABL commissioner Abe Saperstein declared that the Steers were ABL champions.

=== "Bumper" nickname ===
Tormohlen said that he received his nickname "Bumper" from teammate Bill Bridges, while playing with the Steers. The two would frequently work out against each other, and in light of the sizable Tormohlen's aggressive play, Bridges began to call him "Bumper". After joining the NBA, the 6 ft 8 in (2.03 m) 230 lb (104 kg) – also reported to be 6 ft 9 in (2.06 m) 252 lb (114.3 kg) during his NBA career – Tormohlen was known for forcefully pursuing rebounds in a straight line regardless of other players being between him and the ball, including against his own teammates in practice. This contributed to use of the "Bumper" nickname among his Hawks' teammates in 1963. At least by late 1963, he was being referred to as "Bumper" in St. Louis newspapers covering the Hawks. Off of the basketball court, from his youth on throughout his entire life, Tormohlen was known for his gentle and kind ways towards others. In 1999, St. Louis sports columnist Dan O'Neill named Gene "Bumper" Tormohlen as his "Basketball Nickname of the Century".

=== National Basketball Association ===
In July 1962, as the ABL was failing, the St. Louis Hawks obtained the contract rights to Tormohlen and six other ABL players including, among others, Bill Bridges, Hal Lear, and Mike Farmer. The Hawks had earlier sent Dave Gambee to the Syracuse Nationals, who had drafted Tormohlen in 1959, as part of obtaining Tormohlen's rights. The Hawks also obtained John Barnhill from the ABL in the summer of 1962. Even after these moves by the Hawks, Tormohlen and his Steers' teammate Bridges continued to play for the Steers late into 1962, before the ABL actually collapsed on December 31, 1962. Tormohlen and Bridges signed with the Hawks in early January 1963. Tormohlen played in only seven games for the Hawks in the 1962–63 season, averaging less than seven minutes per game.

Tormohlen played in 51 games for the Hawks the following season (1963–64), averaging 12.5 minutes, 4.1 points, and 4.2 rebounds per game. His best game that season came on December 22, 1963, against the Baltimore Bullets, and their future Hall of Fame all-star center Walt Bellamy. Bellamy scored 31 points in the first half alone, mostly being defended by the Hawks' Bob Nordmann and Bob Pettit. After Tormohlen was inserted near the end of the first half to defend Bellamy, he held Bellamy to seven points in the second half. Tormohlen himself had 13 points and 12 rebounds in 27 minutes, and his hustling play inspired his teammates to move with more mobility on offense and to play tighter defense, leading to a 116–104 Hawks' victory.

In September 1964, before the 1964–65 season, Tormohlen announced he was retiring and he did not play in the 1964–65 season. During the summer of 1965, Hawks' owner Ben Kerner and general manager Marty Blake convinced Tormohlen to come out of retirement to rejoin the Hawks in the coming season as the backup to center Zelmo Beaty. Tormohlen returned to the Hawks for the 1965–66 season, and played in 71 games, averaging 4.8 points and 4.4 rebounds in nearly 11 minutes per game.

Tormohlen played in 63 games for the Hawks during the 1966–67 season. With Beaty injured for a large part of that season, Tormohlen averaged NBA career highs in minutes per game (16.4), points per game (6.3) and rebounds per game (5.5). He also averaged playoff career highs with 8.7 minutes, four points, and 3.7 rebounds per game. Tormohlen had the best game of his career on November 29, 1966, against Wilt Chamberlain and the Philadelphia 76ers (the eventual NBA champions that season). He played 35 minutes, scored 27 points, and had 15 rebounds.

The 1967–68 season was his last full year in the NBA. He played in a career high 77 games, averaging 9.3 minutes, three points, and 2.9 rebounds per game. The Hawks left him unprotected in the 1968 expansion draft, and the Phoenix Suns selected Tormohlen in May 1968. Rather than play for the Suns, Turmonlen announced his retirement from the NBA for a second time in June 1968, at the same time accepting a position as an assistant coach with the now Atlanta Hawks.

Tormohlen did not play during the 1968–69 season. Beaty held out before the 1969–70 NBA season (eventually jumping to the American Basketball Association in October). After giving the Suns a draft pick as compensation, the Hawks activated Tormohlen as a player in September 1969. Tormohlen played eleven total minutes in two games for the Hawks in 1969. Tormohlen continued as an assistant coach to Guerin that season. He retired as a player for a third time and did not play again in the NBA.

During his little over five seasons with the Hawks, Tormohlen appeared in 271 games, averaging nearly 12 minutes, 4.4 points, and 4.1 rebounds per game. The Hawks were in the playoffs all five years Tormohlen played in St. Louis. He played in 26 playoff games, averaging 6.5 minutes, 2.3 points, and 2.5 rebounds per game.

Tormohlen said his biggest thrill in sports was playing on the same basketball court with the Hawks' Bob Pettit, Cliff Hagan, and Lenny Wilkens (all in the Naismith Basketball Hall of Fame).

== Coaching and scouting career ==
=== Atlanta Hawks (1968 to 1976) ===
In June 1968, before beginning their first season in Atlanta, the Hawks named Tormohlen an assistant coach to head coach Richie Guerin. Even before being named as an assistant coach, during the 1966–67 season, Tormohlen helped Hawks' head coach Guerin keep track of timeouts, personal fouls, and team fouls during games. Tormohlen was Guerin's assistant for four seasons, and also came to serve as the Hawks' chief scout/scouting director. When Guerin missed the beginning of training camp in 1971 with an illness, Tormohlen took over until Guerin could return. When it was announced Guerin was leaving his coaching position to become the Hawks' general manager at the end of the 1971–72 season, Tormohlen expressed no interest in the head coaching job.

Cotton Fitzsimmons became the Hawks new coach in the 1972–73 season, and Tormohlen remained an assistant coach; but worked primarily as a scout. He remained an assistant coach under Fitzsimmons for the next three seasons, through 74 games of the 1975–76 season. The team was 31–51 during the 1974–75 season. In 1976, with the Hawks at 28–46 and mired in a ten-game losing streak, Tormohlen was promoted to replace Fitzsimmons on an interim basis on March 30, 1976. Tormohlen coached the last eight games of the 1975–76 season.

=== Chicago Bulls (1976 to 1983) ===
The next season, the Hawks hired Hubie Brown as their full-time head coach, and Brown did not keep Tormohlen on his staff. In early September 1976, Tormohlen was hired as an assistant coach and head scout by the Chicago Bulls, under head coach Ed Badger. Badger coached Chicago for two seasons, and was replaced by Larry Costello. During the 1978–79 season, Tormohlen's scouting role was reduced when Costello was fired in the second half of the 1978–79 season; and the team wanted Tormohlen to spend more time in the role of assistant coach at the team's games.

Jerry Sloan was hired to coach the Bulls before the 1979–80 season, and the team kept Tormohlen in his role as assistant coach and head scout under Sloan for the next two seasons. In October 1980, the Chicago Tribune stated Tormohlen was an assistant coach and head scout with the Bulls, and was one of the three people who directed the Bulls (along with head coach Sloan and assistant coach Phil Johnson). Tormohlen kept his positions with the Bulls in 1981–82, but Sloan was fired during the season. Tormohlen remained a scout with the Bulls until 1983, spending seven seasons overall with the team.

=== Los Angeles Lakers ===
In July 1983, the Los Angeles Lakers hired Tormohlen as a full-time scout. He worked as a Lakers' scout until 2011, when the team let him go in July, along with about 20 other employees, in connection with the 2011 NBA lockout. In the mid-1990s, he worked under Jerry West, who was responsible for scouting the most talented college players as potential first round selections, with Tormohlen looking for players suitable as second round selections or free agent signings. It was also part of Tormohlen's job to dissuade West from picking a player if Tormohlen thought West was making a mistake. It is reported that he served as the Lakers' director of college scouting during some of his time working for the Lakers. He received six NBA championship rings while working with the Lakers.

== Legacy and honors ==
Jerry West, who became one of Tormohlen's best friends when he was general manager with the Lakers, said of Tormohlen, "'Gene was a big man. And I'm not talking about his height, I'm talking about his heart'". Tennessee teammate Dalen Showalter said, "'Personally, he was always a very nice and kind and gentle man . . . But when he got in the ball game, he was mean. He went after the ball no matter who was in his way—Tennessee players, opposing players, it did not matter. He just wanted the ball'".

Tormohlen was also known for his humility. Well after retirement, Tormohlen told stories about his experiences defending Naismith Hall of Fame center Wilt Chamberlain. In one game, he was certain he had caused Chamberlain to commit a foul, which would have resulted in Chamberlain's fouling out of a game for the only time in his career. Instead, the referee called Tormohlen for fouling Chamberlain. Tormohlen related, "I walked by the free throw line and said to Wilt, ‘It must be great to be a superstar.’ Wilt said, ‘Tormohlen, that’s one thing you’ll never have to worry about".

In 1987, Tormohlen was inducted into the Indiana Basketball Hall of Fame. In 2009, he was voted as among the top-20 players in Tennessee's 100-year history. In 2012, he was honored as Tennessee's SEC Basketball Legend at the SEC tournament.

== Personal life and death ==
Tormohlen met his wife Julie (Stafford) Tormohlen while playing in Kansas City, and they had two children. He died on December 27, 2018, at age 81.

== Career statistics ==
Legend
GP	Games played	GS	Games started	MPG	Minutes per game
FG%	Field goal percentage	3P%	3-point field goal percentage	FT%	Free throw percentage
RPG	Rebounds per game	APG	Assists per game	SPG	Steals per game
BPG	Blocks per game	PPG	Points per game	**Bold**	Career high

=== NBA ===
==== Regular season ====
Year	Team	GP	MPG	FG%	FT%	RPG	APG	PPG
1962–63	St. Louis	7	6.7	**.500**	.200	2.1	.7	1.7
1963–64	St. Louis	51	12.5	.376	.478	4.2	1.0	4.1
1965–66	St. Louis	71	10.9	.444	**.659**	4.4	.8	4.8
1966–67	St. Louis	63	**16.4**	.427	.595	**5.5**	**1.2**	**6.3**
1967–68	St. Louis	**77**	9.3	.374	.589	2.9	.9	3.0
1969–70	Atlanta	2	5.5	**.500**	–	2.0	.5	2.0
Career		271	11.9	.411	.579	4.1	.9	4.4

==== Playoffs ====
Year	Team	GP	MPG	FG%	FT%	RPG	APG	PPG
1963	St. Louis	5	3.0	.400	–	1.0	.6	1.6
1964	St. Louis	**6**	6.5	.385	.600	2.3	.8	2.2
1966	St. Louis	**6**	6.3	.200	**.750**	3.0	1.0	1.2
1967	St. Louis	**6**	**8.7**	**.524**	.400	**3.7**	.3	**4.0**
1968	St. Louis	3	8.3	.333	**.750**	2.0	1.7	2.3
Career		26	6.5	.400	.611	2.5	.8	2.3

== Head coaching record ==
Legend
Regular season	G	Games coached	W	Games won	L	Games lost	W–L %	Win–loss %
Playoffs	PG	Playoff games	PW	Playoff wins	PL	Playoff losses	PW–L %	Playoff win–loss %

Team	Year	G	W	L	W–L%	Finish	PG	PW	PL	PW–L%	Result
Atlanta	1975–76	8	1	7	.125	5th in Central	—	—	—	—	Missed playoffs
