= Sylvester Blye =

American basketball player

Personal information
- Born: February 14, 1938 (age 88)
- Listed height: 6 ft 5 in (1.96 m)
- Listed weight: 235 lb (107 kg)

Career information
- High school: Benjamin Franklin (Manhattan, New York)
- College: Coalinga (1957–1959); Seattle (1960)
- Position: Forward

Career history
- 1961–1963: Washington / New York / Philadelphia Tapers

Sylvester "Sy" Blye (born February 14, 1938) was an American street and professional basketball player.

Blye was famous in the Rucker Park league in New York City, being named to its Hall of Fame. He played briefly in college for Seattle University, before officials found he had played professionally for the Harlem Clowns and at West Hills College Coalinga (WHCC) in California.

He also starred for the Philadelphia/Washington/New York Tapers of the professional American Basketball League. In the 1962/63 season, he scored the 4th most points. Blye is also 5th in career points and 7th in career rebounds in the ABL.

Blye is listed as being deceased in his entry in the WHCC Athletic Hall of Fame.

== ABL Statistics ==
Year	Games	Points per game	Rebounds per game	Assists per game	Minutes per game
1961/62	81	16.0	7.7	1.3	33.3
1962/63	28	17.7	10.0	1.0	34.8
