= Memorial Hall (University of Akron) =

Athletics building in Akron, Ohio

- Interactive map of Memorial Hall
- Location: Carroll Street; Akron, Ohio 44303
- Coordinates: 41°4′32.3″N 81°30′36.2″W
- Owner: University of Akron
- Operator: University of Akron
- Capacity: 3,000
- Surface: Hardwood

Construction
- Groundbreaking: April 8, 1953
- Opened: December 11, 1954
- Closed: June 16, 2010
- Demolished: 2010
- Cost: $1.4 million ($16.8 million in 2025 dollars)

Tenants
- Akron Zips (NCAA); Men's basketball 1954–1983; Women's basketball 1974–1983

Memorial Hall was an on-campus athletics building on the campus of the University of Akron in Akron, Ohio. The 33,000-square-foot (3,100 m^{2}) building was the first to be built during the tenure of Norman P. Auburn, Akron's 10th president, and the first to be built beyond the original Butchel College lands. Memorial Hall was open for the start of the 1954–55 school year, and was dedicated on December 11, 1954, in honor of the 1,534 Summit County residents who lost their lives in World War II. The building replaced Crouse Gymnasium, built in 1888 and the oldest building on campus at the time, as the home for physical education. It also served as the new home of the men's basketball team, allowing them to host home games on campus again. The team had moved out of Crouse Gymnasium, which had seating for only a few hundred fans, in the 1920s to the larger off-campus Akron Armory.

The arena itself, like many built at the time, featured sideline chair seating above lower retractable bleachers. The ground level of Memorial Hall, below the arena, included a pool. During its time it served as the home of the Akron Zips men's basketball team from its opening, and the women's basketball team from its founding in 1974, until the opening of the James A. Rhodes Arena in 1983, which was built just east of the hall and connected by a sky bridge. The hall was also the school's major gathering place prior to the opening of Rhodes Arena, hosting, among others, President Lyndon B. Johnson and candidate Barry Goldwater in 1964, then-candidate Richard M. Nixon in 1968, Ralph Nader, Dick Gregory and Pat Paulsen, as well as musical acts including Chicago, Ray Charles, The Fifth Dimension and Stevie Wonder.

After the opening of Rhodes Arena, the building served as a classroom and intramural space until its closing in 2010. It was originally demolished to make way for a new College of Education, but that school eventually stayed in a renovated Zook Hall. As of 2022, the area is open green space.
