= Pittsburgh Rens =

- Leagues: American Basketball League (1961–62)
- Founded: 1961
- Folded: 1962
- Arena: Pittsburgh Civic Arena
- Capacity: 17,537
- Team colors: Blue and white
- Head coach: Neil Johnston
- Championships: 0

The Pittsburgh Rens were an American basketball team based in Pittsburgh, Pennsylvania, that was a member of the American Basketball League from 1961–1962.

== History ==
The American Basketball League played one full season, 1961–1962, and part of the next season until the league folded on December 31, 1962. The founder of the ABL, Abe Saperstein, was the owner of the Harlem Globetrotters, who had competed for many decades against the New York Rens and eventually bought the rights to the Rens' name. Because of the Pittsburgh Renaissance urban renewal project, it was convenient to coin the "Rens" as an instantly-recognizable name for this new version of a basketball team.

When the official announcement of the league was made on April 21, 1960, the original plan was to begin play with six teams in the latter portion of 1960 and add two expansion teams the following year. However, in order to give more time for organizing the league and have all teams beginning at the same time, the start of the league was pushed back to October 1961.

Those two expansion teams were announced on May 10, 1960, with the locales in Pittsburgh and Portland, with future possibilities in Honolulu, Salt Lake City and Vancouver. That changed in October 1960, when Honolulu replaced Portland in the eight-team circuit.

The Rens were owned by Ray (aka Archie), Eugene and Lenny Litman, prominent Pittsburgh businessmen brothers, along with local insurance executive Oscar (Sparky) Adams. Ray Litman, who had made his mark as a fight promoter, had fruitlessly sought to obtain an NBA franchise for Pittsburgh before turning to the ABL. At the time of the announcement of the team, plans were in motion to play at the under-construction Pittsburgh Civic Arena.

However, the NBA had announced plans to expand to Pittsburgh and Chicago, with that new franchise in line to have better playing dates at the new arena. Litman was on the verge of moving the team to Houston when Pittsburgh's proposed NBA owner John H. Harris dropped out less than 24 hours after he'd been chosen by the league. Saying that he knew nothing about basketball, Harris was embarrassed when his belief that Boston Celtics guard Bill Sharman would coach his team was quickly denied by Sharman. Sharman ended up coaching the ABL Cleveland Pipers in 1961-62.

NBA Commissioner Maurice Podoloff made an effort to entice Litman into taking over the abandoned expansion team. That effort died when St. Louis Hawks owner Ben Kerner dismissed the notion and Litman chose to stay in the ABL.

Litman hired Neil Johnston as the team's coach, just weeks after he had resigned from that same capacity with the NBA's Philadelphia Warriors.

On April 22, Litman announced that the team would be known as the Pittsburgh Renaissance, or Rens for short. His stated reason for choosing the name was because, "I wanted to choose a name applicable to the rebirth of Pittsburgh." The shortened version also had some basketball history attached to it, since a New York team had that nickname decades earlier.

On October 2, 1961. the Rens opened their first training camp at Pitt Pavilion, the former home of the Pittsburgh Panthers college basketball team. Following a preseason schedule, they opened the regular season on Nov. 5 at the Civic Arena against the Cleveland Pipers.

== Connie Hawkins ==
Naismith Basketball Hall of Fame member Connie Hawkins, "The Hawk," was signed on September 19, 1961. Hawkins went on to win the ABL Most Valuable Player for the 1961-1962 season, as the Rens finished 23-19. Hawkins averaged 27.5 points and 13.3 rebounds.

Hawkins was 19 years old in 1961. He had been initially banned by the National Basketball Association after being named, but not criminally charged in the 1961 point shaving scandal while he played at the University of Iowa. He averaged 27.6 points 13.2 rebounds in his 94 game Rens' career. Later Hawkins would play for the Pittsburgh Pipers of the American Basketball Association and was ruled eligible by the NBA to play for the Phoenix Suns in 1969. Hawkins was inducted into the Naismith Basketball Hall of Fame in 1992.

== The arena ==
All of the Rens' home games were played in the Pittsburgh Civic Arena. The arena closed in 2010 and was demolished.

== Media Coverage ==
The Rens got radio coverage on WWSW and television on WIIC with Jack Fleming and Joe Tucker calling the games. Television ended abruptly in March 1962 and radio coverage only extended to home games about a month into the second season after much more extensive coverage the first season.

== Notable alumni ==
- Phil Rollins (1961–1963)
- Charlie Tyra (1962–1963)

=== Basketball Hall of Famers ===
Pittsburgh Rens Hall of Famers
Players
No.	Name	Position	Tenure	Inducted
42/43	Connie Hawkins	F/C	1961–1963	1992
Coaches
Name		Position	Tenure	Inducted
Neil Johnston		Head coach	1961–1963	1990

== Year-by-year ==
Year	League	Record	Finish	Playoffs
1961–1962	ABL	41–40	2nd, Eastern	Preliminary round 103–107 San Francisco (OT)
1962–1963	ABL	12–10	3rd	No playoff
