= 1962 in sports =

1962 in sports describes the year's events in world sport.

== Alpine skiing ==
- FIS Alpine World Ski Championships –
  - Men's combined champion: Karl Schranz, Austria
  - Women's combined champion: Marielle Goitschel, France

== American football ==
- NFL Championship: the Green Bay Packers won 16–7 over the New York Giants at Yankee Stadium
- Sugar Bowl (1961 season):
  - The Alabama Crimson Tide won, 10–3, over the Arkansas Razorbacks to win the AP and UPI poll national championship.
- The NCAA-record consecutive stadium sellout streak began at Memorial Stadium in Lincoln, Nebraska, which is still continuing today.
- AFL Championship – Dallas Texans won 20–17 over the Houston Oilers in double overtime

== Artistic gymnastics ==
- World Artistic Gymnastics Championships
  - Men's all-around champion: Yuri Titov, USSR
  - Women's all-around champion: Larisa Latynina, USSR
  - Team competition champions: men's – Japan; women's – USSR

== Association football ==
- Football World Cup in Chile – Brazil won 3–1 over Czechoslovakia

=== United Kingdom ===
- FA Cup final – Tottenham Hotspur won 3-1 versus Burnley
- Football League First Division – Ipswich Town F.C won the First Division

=== Europe ===
- European Cup – Benfica won their second European Cup 5–3 against Real Madrid

== Athletics ==
- Seventh European Championships held from September 12 to September 16 at Belgrade
- Commonwealth Games Championships held in November at Perth, Western Australia

== Australian rules football ==
- Victorian Football League
  - Essendon wins the 66th VFL Premiership (13.12 (90) d Carlton 8.10 (58))
  - Brownlow Medal awarded to Alistair Lord (Geelong)

== Baseball ==
- The National League expands to 10 teams, adding the Houston Colt .45's and the New York Mets. The league expands its schedule from 154 to 162 games.
- January 23 – Bob Feller and Jackie Robinson are selected for the Baseball Hall of Fame in their first years of eligibility.
- October: National League pennant playoff: After finishing tied for the league lead, the Los Angeles Dodgers and San Francisco Giants played-off for the title. The Giants won the series 2 games to 1, thereby winning the National League championship.
- World Series – New York Yankees win 4 games to 3 over the San Francisco Giants. The Series MVP was Ralph Terry, New York.

== Basketball ==
- March 2 – In Hershey, Pennsylvania, Wilt Chamberlain of the Philadelphia Warriors scored 100 points against the New York Knicks, breaking several National Basketball Association records.
- NCAA Division I Men's Basketball Championship –
  - Cincinnati wins 71–59 over Ohio St.
- NBA Finals –
  - Boston Celtics won 4 games to 3 over the Los Angeles Lakers

== Boxing ==
- March 24 – Emile Griffith regained the World Welterweight Championship by knocking out Benny the "Kid" Paret in the 12th round. Paret died ten days later on April 3 as a result of severe head injuries sustained in the fight.
- September 25 – Sonny Liston knocks out Floyd Patterson, two minutes and six seconds into the first round, to become World Heavyweight Champion.

== Canadian football ==
- Grey Cup – Winnipeg Blue Bombers win 28–27 over the Hamilton Tiger-Cats

== Cycling ==
- Giro d'Italia won by Franco Balmamion of Italy
- Tour de France – Jacques Anquetil of France
- UCI Road World Championships – Men's road race – Jean Stablinski of France

== Golf ==
Men's professional

- Masters Tournament – Arnold Palmer
- U.S. Open – Jack Nicklaus
- British Open – Arnold Palmer
- PGA Championship – Gary Player
- Canadian Open – Ted Kroll
- PGA Tour money leader – Arnold Palmer – $81,448

Men's amateur

- British Amateur – Richard Davies
- U.S. Amateur – Labron Harris Jr.

== Horse racing ==
Steeplechases

- Cheltenham Gold Cup – Mandarin
- Grand National – Kilmore

Flat races

- Australia – Melbourne Cup won by Even Stevens
- Canadian Triple Crown:
  1. Queen's Plate – Flaming Page
  2. Prince of Wales Stakes –
  3. Breeders' Stakes –
- France – Prix de l'Arc de Triomphe – Soltikoff
- Ireland – Irish Derby Stakes –
- English Triple Crown:
  1. 2,000 Guineas Stakes – Privy Councillor
  2. The Derby – Larkspur
  3. St. Leger Stakes – Hethersett
- United States Triple Crown Races:
  1. Kentucky Derby – Decidedly
  2. Preakness Stakes – Greek Money
  3. Belmont Stakes – Jaipur

== Ice hockey ==
- Art Ross Trophy as the NHL's leading scorer during the regular season: Bobby Hull, Chicago Black Hawks
- Hart Memorial Trophy for the NHL's Most Valuable Player: Jacques Plante, Montreal Canadiens
- Stanley Cup – Toronto Maple Leafs won 4 games to 2 over the Chicago Black Hawks
- World Hockey Championship –
  - Men's champion: Sweden defeated Canada
- NCAA Men's Ice Hockey Championship – Michigan Technological University Huskies defeat Clarkson University Golden Knights 7–1 in Utica, New York

== Rugby league ==
- 1962 Great Britain Lions tour
- 1962 New Zealand rugby league season
- 1962 NSWRFL season
- 1961–62 Northern Rugby Football League season / 1962–63 Northern Rugby Football League season

== Rugby union ==
- 68th Five Nations Championship series is won by France

== Swimming ==
- February 20 – Australian swimming ace Kevin Berry takes over the world record in the men's 200m butterfly (long course) from USA's Carl Robie at a meet in Melbourne, clocking 2:12.5.
- August 11 – Carl Robie regains the world record in the men's 200m butterfly (long course) and betters the world's best time twice in Cuyahoga Falls, Ohio, clocking 2:12.4 and, eventually, 2:10.8.
- August 19 – US swimmer Sharon Finneran breaks the world record in the women's 200m butterfly (long course) during a meet in Chicago, Illinois – 2:31.2.
- August 25 – Sharon Finneran breaks her own world record in the women's 200m butterfly (long course) during a meet in Los Altos, California – 2:30.7.
- October 23 – Australia's Kevin Berry takes over the world record in the men's 200m butterfly (long course) once again, clocking 2:09.7 at a meet in Melbourne, Victoria.

== Tennis ==
Australia

- Australian Men's Singles Championship – Rod Laver (Australia) defeats Roy Emerson (Australia) 8–6, 0–6, 6–4, 6–4
- Australian Women's Singles Championship – Margaret Smith Court (Australia) defeats Jan Lehane O'Neill (Australia) 6–0, 6–2

England

- Wimbledon Men's Singles Championship – Rod Laver (Australia) defeats Martin Mulligan (Australia) 6–2, 6–2, 6–1
- Wimbledon Women's Singles Championship – Karen Hantze Susman (USA) defeats Věra Pužejová Suková (Czechoslovakia) 6–4, 6–4

France

- French Men's Singles Championship – Rod Laver (Australia) defeats Roy Emerson (Australia) 3–6, 2–6, 6–3, 9–7, 6–2
- French Women's Singles Championship – Margaret Smith Court (Australia) defeats Lesley Turner (Australia) 6–3, 3–6, 7–5

USA

- American Men's Singles Championship – Rod Laver (Australia) defeats Roy Emerson (Australia) 6–2, 6–4, 5–7, 6–4
- American Women's Singles Championship – Margaret Smith Court (Australia) defeats Darlene Hard (USA) 9–7, 6–4

Events

- Rod Laver becomes only the second man in tennis history to win the Grand Slam in tennis.

Davis Cup

- 1962 Davis Cup – Australia 5–0 Mexico at Milton Courts (grass) Brisbane, Australia

== Volleyball ==
- 1962 FIVB Men's World Championship in Moscow won by the USSR

== Yacht racing ==
- The New York Yacht Club retains the America's Cup as Weatherly defeats Australian challenger Gretel, of the Royal Sydney Yacht Squadron, 4 races to 1; it is the first time in 81 years a country other than Great Britain has challenged for the Cup

== Multi-sport events ==
- Asian Games held in Jakarta, Indonesia
- 1962 British Empire and Commonwealth Games held in Perth, Australia
- Central American and Caribbean Games held in Kingston, Jamaica
- Second Winter Universiade held in Villars, Switzerland

== Awards ==
- Associated Press Male Athlete of the Year – Maury Wills, Major League Baseball
- Associated Press Female Athlete of the Year – Dawn Fraser, Swimming
- ABC's Wide World of Sports Athlete of the Year: Jim Beatty, Athletics
