= 1961 in sports =

1961 in sports describes the year's events in world sport.

== American football ==
- NFL Championship: the Green Bay Packers won 37–0 over the New York Giants at Lambeau Field
- Rose Bowl (1960 season):
  - The Minnesota Golden Gophers lost 17–7 to the Washington Huskies; still voted national champions
- The Ohio State Buckeyes boycott a trip to the Rose Bowl the following January resulting in student protests on campus.
- AFL Championship – Houston Oilers won 10–3 over the San Diego Chargers

== Association football ==
=== England ===
- FA Cup final – Tottenham Hotspur 2-0 Leicester City. Tottenham also were division 1 champions, making them the first British club to win the double.

== Australian rules football ==
- Victorian Football League
  - August 12: Richmond becomes the only team to fail to kick a goal in a match since 1921, scoring only 0.8 (8) to St. Kilda's 12.19 (91).
  - September 23: Hawthorn wins the 65th VFL pennant and its first, beating Footscray 13.16 (94) to 7.9 (51)
  - John James wins the 34th Brownlow Medal

== Bandy ==
- 1961 Bandy World Championship is held in Norway and won by Soviet Union.

== Baseball ==
- The American League expands to 10 teams, adding the Los Angeles Angels and the new Washington Senators. The league schedule is expanded from 154 to 162 games.
- January 16 – Mickey Mantle becomes the highest paid player in Major League Baseball by signing a contract that will pay him $75,000 per season.
- April 11 – The former Washington Senators play their first home game in Metropolitan Stadium as the Minnesota Twins
- July 13 – In his majors debut, Milwaukee Braves outfielder Mack Jones tied a post-1900 National League record by collecting three singles and a double in his first game.
- Roger Maris hits 61 home runs during the regular season, establishing a record for the longer season. Babe Ruth's record of 60 still stood for the shorter season.
- October – World Series – New York Yankees win 4 games to 1 over the Cincinnati Reds. The series MVP is Whitey Ford of the Yankees.

== Basketball ==
- NCAA Men's Basketball Championship –
  - Cincinnati wins 70–65 over Ohio St.
- NBA Finals –
  - Boston Celtics won 4 games to 1 over the St. Louis Hawks
- The twelfth European basketball championship, Eurobasket 1961, is won by Soviet Union.

== Boxing ==
- June 3 in Los Angeles – Emile Griffith knocked out Gaspar Ortega in the 12th round to retain the Welterweight Championship

== Canadian football ==
- Grey Cup – Winnipeg Blue Bombers win 21–14 over the Hamilton Tiger-Cats

== Cycling ==
- August 1 – death of Adrie Voorting (aged 30), Dutch road bicycle and track cyclist
- Giro d'Italia won by Ercole Baldini of Italy
- Tour de France – Jacques Anquetil of France
- UCI Road World Championships – Men's road race – Rik Van Looy of Belgium

== Figure skating ==
- The World Figure Skating Championships in Prague are cancelled after the entire USA team of skaters, officials, leaders and chaperones are killed in a plane crash on 15 February en route to the competition.
- Among the dead are:
  - Bradley Lord (21), USA men's figure skating champion;
  - Maribel Vinson-Owen, USA women's figure skating champion and coach;
  - Maribel Yerxa Owen (20), USA women's figure skating champion;
  - Laurence Owen (16), USA women's figure skating champion.

== Golf ==
Men's professional

- Masters Tournament – Gary Player becomes the first international golfer to win the Masters.
- U.S. Open – Gene Littler
- The Open – Arnold Palmer
- PGA Championship – Jerry Barber
- PGA Tour money leader – Gary Player – $64,540
- Ryder Cup – United States wins 14½ to 9½ over Britain in team golf.

Men's amateur

- British Amateur – Michael Bonallack
- U.S. Amateur – Jack Nicklaus

Women's professional

- Women's Western Open – Mary Lena Faulk
- LPGA Championship – Mickey Wright
- U.S. Women's Open – Mickey Wright
- Titleholders Championship – Mickey Wright
- LPGA Tour money leader – Mickey Wright – $22,236

== Harness racing ==
- United States Pacing Triple Crown races –
  1. Cane Pace – Cold Front
  2. Little Brown Jug – Henry T. Adios
  3. Messenger Stakes – Adios Don
- United States Trotting Triple Crown races –
  1. Hambletonian – Harlan Dean
  2. Yonkers Trot – Duke Rodney
  3. Kentucky Futurity – Duke Rodney
- Australian Inter Dominion Harness Racing Championship –
  - Pacers: Massacre

== Horse racing ==
Steeplechases

- Cheltenham Gold Cup – Saffron Tartan
- Grand National – Nicolaus Silver

Flat races

- Australia – Melbourne Cup won by Lord Fury
- Canada – Queen's Plate won by Blue Light
- France – Prix de l'Arc de Triomphe won by Molvedo
- Ireland – Irish Derby Stakes won by Your Highness
- English Triple Crown Races:
  1. 2,000 Guineas Stakes – Rockavon
  2. The Derby – Psidium
  3. St. Leger Stakes – Aurelius
- United States Triple Crown Races:
  1. Kentucky Derby – Carry Back
  2. Preakness Stakes – Carry Back
  3. Belmont Stakes – Sherluck

== Ice hockey ==
- Art Ross Trophy as the NHL's leading scorer during the regular season: Bernie "Boom-Boom" Geoffrion, Montreal Canadiens
- Hart Memorial Trophy for the NHL's Most Valuable Player: Bernie "Boom-Boom" Geoffrion, Montreal Canadiens
- Stanley Cup – Chicago Black Hawks win 4 games to 2 over the Detroit Red Wings
- World Hockey Championship –
  - Men's champion: Trail Smoke Eaters from Canada
- NCAA Men's Ice Hockey Championship – University of Denver Pioneers defeat St. Lawrence University Saints 12–2 in Denver, Colorado

== Radiosport ==
- First European Amateur Radio Direction Finding Championships held in Stockholm, Sweden. This event was the first organized international competition in the sport.

== Rugby league ==
- 1961 Kangaroo tour of New Zealand
- 1961 New Zealand rugby league season
- 1960–61 Northern Rugby Football League season / 1961–62 Northern Rugby Football League season
- 1961 NSWRFL season

== Rugby union ==
- 67th Five Nations Championship series is won by France

== Swimming ==
- August 13 – USA's Becky Collins breaks the world record in the women's 200m butterfly (long course) during a meet in Philadelphia – 2:32.8.
- August 19 – US swimmer Carl Robie takes over the world record in the men's 200m butterfly (long course) from his compatriot Michael Troy at a meet in Los Angeles, clocking 2:12.6.

== Tennis ==
Australia

- Australian Men's Singles Championship – Roy Emerson (Australia) defeats Rod Laver (Australia) 1–6, 6–3, 7–5, 6–4
- Australian Women's Singles Championship – Margaret Smith Court (Australia) defeats Jan Lehane O'Neill (Australia) 6–1, 6–4

England

- Wimbledon Men's Singles Championship – Rod Laver (Australia) defeats Chuck McKinley (USA) 6–3, 6–1, 6–4
- Wimbledon Women's Singles Championship – Angela Mortimer Barrett (Great Britain) defeats Christine Truman Janes (Great Britain) 4–6, 6–4, 7–5

France

- French Men's Singles Championship – Manuel Santana (Spain) defeats Nicola Pietrangeli (Italy) 4–6, 6–1, 3–6, 6–0, 6–2
- French Women's Singles Championship – Ann Haydon (Great Britain) defeats Yola Ramírez (Mexico) 6–2, 6–1

USA

- American Men's Singles Championship – Roy Emerson (Australia) defeats Rod Laver (Australia) 7–5, 6–3, 6–2
- American Women's Singles Championship – Darlene Hard (USA) defeats Ann Haydon (Great Britain) 6–3, 6–4

Davis Cup

- 1961 Davis Cup – Australia 5–0 Italy at Kooyong Stadium (grass) Melbourne, Australia

== Multi-sport events ==
- Pan Arab Games held in Casablanca, Morocco
- Second Summer Universiade held in Sofia, Bulgaria

== Awards ==
- Associated Press Male Athlete of the Year – Roger Maris, Major League Baseball
- Associated Press Female Athlete of the Year – Wilma Rudolph, Track and field
