= 1957–58 NCAA University Division men's basketball season =

Men's university basketball season

- Preseason AP No. 1: None
- NCAA Tournament: 1958
- Tournament dates: March 11, 1958 – March 22, 1958
- National Championship: Freedom Hall; Louisville, Kentucky
- NCAA Champions: Kentucky Wildcats
- Helms National Champions: Kentucky Wildcats
- Other champions: Xavier Musketeers (NIT)
- Player of the Year (Helms): Elgin Baylor, Seattle Chieftains

The 1957–58 NCAA University Division men's basketball season began in December 1957, progressed through the regular season and conference tournaments, and concluded with the 1958 NCAA University Division basketball tournament championship game on March 22, 1958, at Freedom Hall in Louisville, Kentucky. The Kentucky Wildcats won their fourth NCAA national championship with an 84–72 victory over the Seattle Chieftains.

== Season headlines ==
- The NCAA University Division grew to 179 teams, an increase from 156 the previous season.
- Adolph Rupp won his fourth championship as he led the Kentucky Wildcats to an 84–72 win over the Seattle Chieftains and their star, Elgin Baylor. The starting unit was nicknamed the "Fiddlin' Five," after a quip by Rupp that his team were fiddlers when he really needed violinists. The Wildcats fought back from two 11-point deficits to gain the victory.
- Cincinnati's Oscar Robertson became the first player to lead the nation is scoring in his first varsity season. The sophomore (freshmen were ineligible) averaged 35.1 points per game for the Bearcats. He also became the first player to score 50 or more points in an NCAA tournament game when he scored 56 against Arkansas in a regional third-place game on March 15, 1958.
- Dom Flora, a senior point guard at Washington and Lee University, finished his college career with 2,310 points and 696 free throws made, both of which were ranked fifth in their respective categories in college basketball history at the end of the 1957–58 season.
- Future Hall of Fame coach Howard Cann of NYU retired at the conclusion of the season, after 35 years at the helm.
- The NCAA championship game saw the first use of an orange basketball. Previously, the NCAA had used brown basketballs.
- The Western New York Little Three Conference disbanded at the end of the season.

== Major rule changes ==
Beginning in 1957–58, the following rules changes were implemented:

- Offensive goaltending was banned so that no player from either team could touch the ball or basket when the ball was on the basket's rim or above the cylinder. The only exception was the shooter in the original act of shooting.
- One free throw for each common foul was taken for the first six personal fouls by one team in each half, and the one-and-one was used thereafter.
- On uniforms, the single-digit numbers "1" and "2" and any digit greater than "5" in player numbers were prohibited as a means of simplifying referees' hand signals to the scorer's table when calling a foul. A failure to comply resulted in the assessment of a technical foul against the offending team. The single-digit numbers "1" and "2" were not permitted again until the 1999–2000 season and digits greater than 5 were not permitted again until the 2023–24 season.
- A ball that passes over the backboard – either front-to-back or back-to-front — was considered out of bounds.

== Conference membership changes ==
School	Former conference	New conference
Air Force Falcons	non-NCAA University Division	NCAA University Division independent
Boston University Terriers	non-NCAA University Division	NCAA University Division independent
Cincinnati Bearcats	NCAA University Division independent	Missouri Valley Conference
Delaware Fightin' Blue Hens	non-NCAA University Division	NCAA University Division independent
Detroit Titans	Missouri Valley Conference	NCAA University Division independent
East Tennessee State Buccaneers	non-NCAA University Division	Ohio Valley Conference
Fresno State Bulldogs	West Coast Athletic Conference	NCAA University Division independent
Montana State Bobcats	non-NCAA University Division	NCAA University Division independent
North Texas State Mean Green	non-NCAA University Division	Missouri Valley Conference
Oklahoma State Cowboys	Missouri Valley Conference	NCAA University Division independent
Providence Friars	non-NCAA University Division	NCAA University Division independent
Texas Tech Red Raiders	NCAA University Division independent	Southwest Conference

== Regular season ==
=== Conferences ===
==== Conference winners and tournaments ====
Conference	Regular season winner	Conference player of the year	Conference tournament	Tournament venue (City)	Tournament winner
Atlantic Coast Conference	Duke	Pete Brennan, North Carolina	1958 ACC men's basketball tournament	Reynolds Coliseum (Raleigh, North Carolina)	Maryland
Big Eight Conference	Kansas State	Bob Boozer, Kansas State	No Tournament		
Big Ten Conference	Indiana	None Selected	No Tournament		
Border Conference	Arizona State	None Selected	No Tournament		
Ivy League	Dartmouth	None Selected	No Tournament		
Metropolitan New York Conference	St. John's	None Selected	No Tournament		
Mid-American Conference	Toledo	None Selected	No Tournament		
Missouri Valley Conference	Cincinnati	None Selected	No Tournament		
Mountain States (Skyline) Conference	Idaho State	None Selected	No Tournament		
Ohio Valley Conference	Tennessee Tech	None Selected	No Tournament		
Pacific Coast Conference	California & Oregon State	None Selected	No Tournament; California defeated Oregon State in a single-game conference playoff		
Southeastern Conference	Kentucky	None Selected	No Tournament		
Southern Conference	West Virginia	Dom Flora, Washington and Lee	1958 Southern Conference men's basketball tournament	Richmond Arena (Richmond, Virginia)	West Virginia
Southwest Conference	Arkansas & SMU	Rick Herrscher, SMU (awarded by Coach magazine)	No Tournament		
West Coast Athletic Conference	San Francisco	Mike Farmer, San Francisco, & Leroy Wright, Pacific	No Tournament		
Western New York Little Three Conference	St. Bonaventure		No Tournament		
Yankee Conference	Connecticut	None selected	No Tournament		

==== Conference standings ====
1957–58 ACC men's basketball standings
	Conf.				Overall
Team	W		L	PCT	W		L	PCT
No. 10 Duke	11	–	3	.786	18	–	7	.720
No. 20 NC State	10	–	4	.714	18	–	6	.750
No. 13 North Carolina	10	–	4	.714	19	–	7	.731
No. 6 Maryland †	9	–	5	.643	22	–	7	.759
Virginia	6	–	8	.429	10	–	13	.435
Clemson	4	–	10	.286	8	–	16	.333
South Carolina	3	–	11	.214	5	–	19	.208
Wake Forest	3	–	11	.214	6	–	17	.261
† 1958 ACC tournament winner Rankings from AP Poll

1957–58 Big Eight Conference men's basketball standings
	Conf.				Overall
Team	W		L	PCT	W		L	PCT
No. 3 Kansas State	10	–	2	.833	22	–	5	.815
No. 7 Kansas	8	–	4	.667	18	–	5	.783
Iowa State	8	–	4	.667	15	–	8	.652
Oklahoma	5	–	7	.417	13	–	10	.565
Nebraska	5	–	7	.417	10	–	13	.435
Missouri	3	–	9	.250	9	–	13	.409
Colorado	3	–	9	.250	8	–	15	.348
Rankings from AP Poll

1957–58 Big Ten Conference men's basketball standings
	Conf.				Overall
Team	W		L	PCT	W		L	PCT
No. 12 Indiana	10	–	4	.714	13	–	11	.542
No. 17 Michigan State	9	–	5	.643	16	–	6	.727
Purdue	9	–	5	.643	14	–	8	.636
Northwestern	8	–	6	.571	13	–	9	.591
Ohio State	8	–	6	.571	9	–	13	.409
Iowa	7	–	7	.500	13	–	9	.591
Michigan	6	–	8	.429	11	–	11	.500
Illinois	5	–	9	.357	11	–	11	.500
Minnesota	5	–	9	.357	9	–	12	.429
Wisconsin	3	–	11	.214	8	–	14	.364
Rankings from AP Poll

1957–58 Border Conference men's basketball standings
	Conf.				Overall
Team	W		L	PCT	W		L	PCT
Arizona State–Tempe	8	–	2	.800	13	–	13	.500
New Mexico A&M	7	–	3	.700	14	–	9	.609
Texas Western	5	–	5	.500	14	–	9	.609
Hardin–Simmons	4	–	6	.400	11	–	14	.440
Arizona	4	–	6	.400	10	–	15	.400
West Texas State	2	–	8	.200	3	–	15	.167
Rankings from AP Poll

1957–58 Ivy League men's basketball standings
	Conf.				Overall
Team	W		L	PCT	W		L	PCT
Dartmouth	11	–	3	.786	22	–	5	.815
Princeton	9	–	5	.643	15	–	8	.652
Yale	9	–	5	.643	14	–	10	.583
Pennsylvania	8	–	6	.571	13	–	12	.520
Harvard	7	–	7	.500	16	–	9	.640
Cornell	5	–	9	.357	11	–	11	.500
Brown	5	–	9	.357	10	–	15	.400
Columbia	2	–	12	.143	6	–	18	.250
Rankings from AP Poll

1957–58 Metropolitan New York Conference men's basketball standings
	Conf.				Overall
Team	W		L	PCT	W		L	PCT
St. John's	6	–	0	1.000	18	–	8	.692
Manhattan	3	–	1	.750	16	–	10	.615
St. Francis (NY)	2	–	1	.667	14	–	9	.609
NYU	2	–	2	.500	10	–	11	.476
CCNY	2	–	5	.286	9	–	8	.529
Fordham	1	–	3	.250	15	–	9	.625
Brooklyn	0	–	4	.000	11	–	7	.611
Rankings from AP Poll

1957–58 Mid-American Conference men's basketball standings
	Conf.				Overall
Team	W		L	PCT	W		L	PCT
Miami	12	–	0	1.000	18	–	9	.667
Marshall	9	–	3	.750	17	–	7	.708
Ohio	7	–	5	.583	16	–	8	.667
Bowling Green	6	–	6	.500	15	–	8	.652
Toledo	4	–	8	.333	9	–	14	.391
Kent State	3	–	9	.250	9	–	14	.391
Western Michigan	1	–	11	.083	5	–	19	.208
Rankings from AP Poll

1957–58 Missouri Valley Conference men's basketball standings
	Conf.				Overall
Team	W		L	PCT	W		L	PCT
No. 2 Cincinnati	13	–	1	.929	25	–	3	.893
No. 14 Bradley	12	–	2	.857	20	–	7	.741
Saint Louis	9	–	5	.643	16	–	10	.615
Wichita Municipal	7	–	7	.500	14	–	12	.538
Houston	6	–	8	.429	9	–	16	.360
Drake	4	–	10	.286	13	–	12	.520
Tulsa	4	–	10	.286	7	–	19	.269
North Texas State	1	–	13	.071	3	–	18	.143
Rankings from AP Poll

1957–58 Mountain States Conference men's basketball standings
	Conf.				Overall
Team	W		L	PCT	W		L	PCT
Wyoming	10	–	4	.714	13	–	14	.481
Utah	9	–	5	.643	20	–	7	.741
Colorado State	9	–	5	.643	14	–	11	.560
BYU	9	–	5	.643	13	–	13	.500
Montana	8	–	6	.571	12	–	10	.545
Denver	8	–	6	.571	13	–	12	.520
Utah State	3	–	11	.214	4	–	20	.167
New Mexico	0	–	14	.000	3	–	21	.125
Rankings from AP Poll

1957–58 Ohio Valley Conference men's basketball standings
	Conf.				Overall
Team	W		L	PCT	W		L	PCT
Tennessee Tech	8	–	2	.800	17	–	9	.654
Morehead State	6	–	4	.600	13	–	10	.565
Western Kentucky State	5	–	5	.500	14	–	11	.560
Murray State	4	–	6	.400	8	–	16	.333
Middle Tennessee		–		–	11	–	10	.524
Eastern Kentucky State	3	–	7	.300	8	–	11	.421
East Tennessee State		–		–	7	–	18	.280
Rankings from AP Poll

1957–58 Pacific Coast Conference men's basketball standings
	Conf.				Overall
Team	W		L	PCT	W		L	PCT
California †	12	–	4	.750	19	–	9	.679
Oregon State	12	–	4	.750	20	–	6	.769
UCLA	10	–	6	.625	16	–	10	.615
Idaho	9	–	7	.563	17	–	9	.654
USC	8	–	8	.500	12	–	13	.480
Stanford	7	–	9	.438	12	–	13	.480
Oregon	6	–	10	.375	13	–	11	.542
Washington	5	–	11	.313	8	–	18	.308
Washington State	3	–	13	.188	7	–	19	.269
† Conference playoff game winner Rankings from AP Poll

1957–58 Southeastern Conference men's basketball standings
	Conf.				Overall
Team	W		L	PCT	W		L	PCT
No. 9 Kentucky	12	–	2	.857	23	–	6	.793
No. 16 Auburn	11	–	3	.786	16	–	6	.727
No. 15 Mississippi State	9	–	5	.643	20	–	5	.800
Alabama	9	–	5	.643	17	–	9	.654
Tennessee	8	–	6	.571	16	–	7	.696
Georgia Tech	8	–	6	.571	15	–	11	.577
Vanderbilt	7	–	7	.500	14	–	11	.560
Ole Miss	6	–	8	.429	12	–	12	.500
Florida	5	–	9	.357	12	–	9	.571
Tulane	3	–	11	.214	8	–	15	.348
LSU	3	–	11	.214	7	–	18	.280
Georgia	3	–	11	.214	7	–	19	.269
Rankings from AP Poll

1957–58 Southern Conference men's basketball standings
	Conf.				Overall
Team	W		L	PCT	W		L	PCT
No. 1 West Virginia †	12	–	0	1.000	26	–	2	.929
Virginia Tech	10	–	5	.667	11	–	8	.579
George Washington	8	–	4	.667	12	–	11	.522
The Citadel	9	–	6	.600	16	–	11	.593
Richmond	8	–	8	.500	14	–	12	.538
William & Mary	9	–	9	.500	15	–	14	.517
Furman	4	–	8	.333	10	–	16	.385
Davidson	4	–	8	.333	9	–	15	.375
Washington and Lee	4	–	9	.308	9	–	16	.360
VMI	1	–	12	.077	4	–	17	.190
† Southern Conference Tournament winner Rankings from AP Poll

1957–58 Southwest Conference men's basketball standings
	Conf.				Overall
Team	W		L	PCT	W		L	PCT
Arkansas	9	–	5	.643	17	–	10	.630
SMU	9	–	5	.643	15	–	10	.600
TCU	8	–	6	.571	17	–	7	.708
Texas Tech	8	–	6	.571	15	–	8	.652
Rice	7	–	7	.500	13	–	11	.542
Texas A&M	7	–	7	.500	11	–	13	.458
Texas	5	–	9	.357	10	–	13	.435
Baylor	3	–	11	.214	5	–	19	.208
Rankings from AP Poll

1957–58 West Coast Athletic Conference men's basketball standings
	Conf.				Overall
Team	W		L	PCT	W		L	PCT
No. 4 San Francisco	12	–	0	1.000	25	–	2	.926
Saint Mary's	8	–	4	.667	11	–	15	.423
Santa Clara	6	–	6	.500	13	–	11	.542
Pepperdine	5	–	7	.417	15	–	11	.577
San Jose State	5	–	7	.417	13	–	13	.500
Pacific	5	–	7	.417	9	–	15	.375
Loyola (Calif.)	1	–	11	.083	6	–	18	.250
Rankings from AP Poll

1957–58 Western New York Little Three Conference men's basketball standings
	Conf.				Overall
Team	W		L	PCT	W		L	PCT
St. Bonaventure	4	–	0	1.000	21	–	5	.808
Niagara	0	–	2	.000	18	–	7	.720
Canisius	0	–	2	.000	2	–	19	.095
Rankings from AP Poll

1957–58 Yankee Conference men's basketball standings
	Conf.				Overall
Team	W		L	PCT	W		L	PCT
Connecticut	9	–	1	.900	17	–	10	.630
Vermont	5	–	5	.500	15	–	10	.600
Massachusetts	5	–	5	.500	13	–	12	.520
New Hampshire	4	–	6	.400	10	–	12	.455
Maine	4	–	6	.400	8	–	12	.400
Rhode Island	3	–	7	.300	4	–	17	.190

=== University Division independents ===
A total of 50 college teams played as University Division independents. Among them, Temple (27–3) finished with both the best winning percentage (.900) and the most wins.

1957–58 NCAA University Division men's basketball independents standings
	Conf.				Overall
Team	W		L	PCT	W		L	PCT
No. 5 Temple		–		–	27	–	3	.900
No. 11 Dayton		–		–	25	–	4	.862
No. 8 Notre Dame		–		–	24	–	5	.828
Saint Francis (Pa.)		–		–	20	–	5	.800
No. 18 Seattle		–		–	23	–	6	.793
Boston University		–		–	15	–	5	.750
Iona		–		–	18	–	6	.750
Providence		–		–	18	–	6	.750
Air Force		–		–	17	–	6	.739
No. 19 Oklahoma State		–		–	21	–	8	.724
Pittsburgh		–		–	18	–	7	.720
Boston College		–		–	15	–	6	.714
Fresno State		–		–	19	–	8	.704
Montana State		–		–	18	–	8	.692
Memphis State		–		–	15	–	7	.682
Bucknell		–		–	16	–	8	.667
Loyola (Ill.)		–		–	16	–	8	.667
Saint Joseph's		–		–	18	–	9	.667
Holy Cross		–		–	16	–	9	.640
La Salle		–		–	16	–	9	.640
Loyola (La.)		–		–	16	–	9	.640
Miami (Fla.)		–		–	14	–	8	.636
Xavier		–		–	19	–	11	.633
Portland		–		–	18	–	11	.621
Gonzaga		–		–	16	–	10	.615
Lafayette		–		–	16	–	10	.615
Butler		–		–	15	–	10	.600
Kentucky Wesleyan		–		–	14	–	10	.583
Oklahoma City		–		–	14	–	12	.538
Syracuse		–		–	11	–	10	.524
Washington University		–		–	11	–	10	.524
Villanova		–		–	12	–	11	.522
Army		–		–	13	–	12	.520
Detroit		–		–	13	–	12	.520
Louisville		–		–	13	–	12	.520
Marquette		–		–	11	–	11	.500
Muhlenberg		–		–	12	–	12	.500
Navy		–		–	10	–	10	.500
Georgetown		–		–	10	–	11	.476
Duquesne		–		–	10	–	12	.455
Lehigh		–		–	8	–	10	.444
Penn State		–		–	8	–	11	.421
Delaware		–		–	8	–	12	.400
DePaul		–		–	8	–	12	.400
Florida State		–		–	9	–	16	.360
Valparaiso		–		–	7	–	14	.333
Rutgers		–		–	7	–	15	.318
Colgate		–		–	6	–	16	.273
Seton Hall		–		–	7	–	19	.269
Siena		–		–	5	–	15	.250
Rankings from AP Poll

=== Informal championships ===
Conference	Regular season winner	Most Valuable Player
Philadelphia Big 5	Temple	Guy Rodgers, Temple

Temple finished with a 4–0 record in head-to-head competition among the Philadelphia Big 5.

=== Statistical leaders ===
Points per game			Rebound Percentage			Field goal percentage			Free throw percentage		
Player	School	PPG	Player	School	REB%	Player	School	FG%	Player	School	FT%
Oscar Robertson	Cincinnati	35.1	Boo Ellis	Niagara	.262	Ralph Crosthwaite	W. Kentucky State	61.0	Semi Mintz	Davidson	88.2
Elgin Baylor	Seattle	32.5	Al Inniss	St. Francis (NY)	.248	Oscar Robertson	Cincinnati	57.1	Gerald Myers	Texas Tech	87.0
Wilt Chamberlain	Kansas	30.1	Elgin Baylor	Seattle	.235	Pete Brunone	Manhattan	56.2	Arlen Clark	Oklahoma State	86.5
Bailey Howell	Mississippi State	27.8	Wilt Chamberlain	Kansas	.216	Bob Goodall	Tulsa	55.7	Joe Hobbs	Florida	86.0
Red Murrell	Drake	26.7	Joe Cincebox	Syracuse	.206	Hal Greer	Marshall	54.6	Hub Reed	Oklahoma City	85.1

== Polls ==
The final top 20 from the AP and Coaches Polls.

Associated Press
Ranking	Team
1	West Virginia
2	Cincinnati
3	Kansas State
4	San Francisco
5	Temple
6	Maryland
7	Kansas
8	Notre Dame
9	Kentucky
10	Duke
11	Dayton
12	Indiana
13	North Carolina
14	Bradley
15	Mississippi State
16	Auburn
17	Michigan State
18	Seattle
19	Oklahoma State
20	NC State

Coaches
Ranking	Team
1	West Virginia
2	Cincinnati
3	San Francisco
4	Kansas State
5	Temple
6	Maryland
7	Notre Dame
8	Kansas
9	Dayton
10	Indiana
11	Bradley
12	North Carolina
13	Duke
14	Kentucky
15	Oklahoma State
16	Oregon State
16	NC State
18	St. Bonaventure
19	Seattle
19	Michigan State
19	Wyoming

== Post-season tournaments ==
=== NCAA tournament ===
Adolph Rupp's Kentucky Wildcats won their fourth National championship by defeating the Seattle Chieftains 84–72 on March 22 at Freedom Hall in Louisville, Kentucky. Seattle's Elgin Baylor led all tournament scorers and was named the tournament Most Outstanding Player.

==== Final Four ====
National semifinals
M2	Kentucky	61
W1	Temple	60
S1	Seattle	73
E3	Kansas State	51

National championship game
2	Seattle	72
1	Kentucky	84
Third place
3	Temple	67
4	Kansas State	57

=== National Invitation tournament ===
The Xavier Musketeers entered the National Invitation Tournament with a 15–11 record, but surprised the field, defeating fellow Ohio school Dayton 78–74 to win the NIT. The Musketeers' Hank Stein was named tournament MVP.

==== NIT Semifinals and Final ====
Played at Madison Square Garden in New York City

Semifinals
1	St. John’s	56
3	Dayton	80
2	St. Bonaventure	53
2	Xavier	72

Final
3	Dayton	74
2	Xavier	78
Third place
1	St. John's	69
2	St. Bonaventure	84

== Award winners ==
=== Consensus All-American teams ===
Consensus First Team
Player	Position	Class	Team
Elgin Baylor	F	Junior	Seattle
Bob Boozer	F	Junior	Kansas State
Wilt Chamberlain	C	Junior	Kansas
Don Hennon	G	Junior	Pittsburgh
Oscar Robertson	G	Sophomore	Cincinnati
Guy Rodgers	G	Senior	Temple

Consensus Second Team
Player	Position	Class	Team
Pete Brennan	F	Senior	North Carolina
Archie Dees	F/C	Senior	Indiana
Mike Farmer	F	Senior	San Francisco
Dave Gambee	F	Senior	Oregon State
Bailey Howell	F	Junior	Mississippi State

=== Major player of the year awards ===
- Helms Foundation Player of the Year: Elgin Baylor, Seattle
- UPI Player of the Year: Oscar Robertson, Cincinnati
- Sporting News Player of the Year: Oscar Robertson, Cincinnati

=== Major coach of the year awards ===
- UPI Coach of the Year: Tex Winter, Kansas State

=== Other major awards ===
- Robert V. Geasey Trophy (Top player in Philadelphia Big 5): Guy Rodgers, Temple
- NIT/Haggerty Award (Top player in NYC): Jim Cunningham, Fordham

== Coaching changes ==
A number of teams changed coaches throughout the season and after the season ended.

Team	Former Coach	Interim Coach	New Coach	Reason
Army	Orvis Sigler		George Hunter	
Columbia	Lou Rossini		Archie Oldham	
Drake	John E. Benington		Maury John	
Duquesne	Dudey Moore		Red Manning	
Iowa	Bucky O'Connor		Sharm Scheuerman	O'Connor died in an automobile accident on April 22, 1958.
La Salle	Jim Pollard		Dudey Moore	
Loyola (LA)	Jim Harding		Hank Kuzma	
Maine	Harold Woodbury		Brian McCall	
Marquette	Jack Nagle		Eddie Hickey	
Memphis State	Eugene Lambert		Bob Vanatta	
Murray State	Rex Alexander		Cal Luther	
New Mexico	Bill Stockton		Bob Sweeney	
NYU	Howard Cann		Lou Rossini	
Ohio State	Floyd Stahl		Fred Taylor	
Saint Louis	Eddie Hickey		John E. Benington	
Seattle	John Castellani		Vincent Cazzetta	After taking the Chieftains to the NCAA title game, Castellani resigned amid recruiting violations that resulted in a two-year post-season ban for the university.
South Carolina	Frank Johnson		Walt Hambrick	
Valparaiso	Ken Suesens		Paul Meadows	
Vanderbilt	Bob Polk		Roy Skinner (interim)	Assistant coach Skinner served as interim coach for the season after Polk suffered a heart attack in the fall of 1957.
VMI	Jack Null		Weenie Miller	
Washington State	Jack Friel		Marv Harshman	
Western Michigan	Joe Hoy		Don Boven	
