= 1957–58 Georgia Bulldogs basketball team =

American college basketball season

1957–58 Georgia Bulldogs basketball
- Conference: Southeastern Conference
- Record: 7–19 (4–10 SEC)
- Head coach: Harbin Lawson (7th season)
- Captain: Henry Cabiniss
- Home arena: Woodruff Hall

1957–58 Southeastern Conference men's basketball standings
	Conf.				Overall
Team	W		L	PCT	W		L	PCT
No. 9 Kentucky	12	–	2	.857	23	–	6	.793
No. 16 Auburn	11	–	3	.786	16	–	6	.727
No. 15 Mississippi State	9	–	5	.643	20	–	5	.800
Alabama	9	–	5	.643	17	–	9	.654
Tennessee	8	–	6	.571	16	–	7	.696
Georgia Tech	8	–	6	.571	15	–	11	.577
Vanderbilt	7	–	7	.500	14	–	11	.560
Ole Miss	6	–	8	.429	12	–	12	.500
Florida	5	–	9	.357	12	–	9	.571
Tulane	3	–	11	.214	8	–	15	.348
LSU	3	–	11	.214	7	–	18	.280
Georgia	3	–	11	.214	7	–	19	.269
Rankings from AP Poll

The 1957–58 Georgia Bulldogs basketball team represented the University of Georgia as a member of the Southeastern Conference (SEC) during the 1957–58 NCAA University Division men's basketball season. Led by seventh-year head coach Harbin Lawson, the Bulldogs compiled an overall record of 7–19 with a mark of 3–11 conference play, placing in a three-way tie for tenth at the bottom of the SEC standings. The team captain was Fred Edmonson.

== Roster ==
1957–58 Georgia Bulldogs men's basketball team
Players
Coaches

Pos.	#	Name	Height	Weight	Year	Previous school	Hometown
G		Ray Allen	6 ft 1 in (1.85 m)	—	Sr
C		Henry Cabaniss	6 ft 5 in (1.96 m)	—	Sr
G		Fred Edmondson	6 ft 0 in (1.83 m)	—	Jr
F		Bill Ensley	6 ft 5 in (1.96 m)	—	Sr
F		Sonny Poss	6 ft 4 in (1.93 m)	—	Jr
G		Don Hartsfield	6 ft 0 in (1.83 m)	—	Sr
		Earl Tidwell	6 ft 5 in (1.96 m)	—
G		Bobby Chaney	6 ft 0 in (1.83 m)	—	Jr
F		Joe De Foor	6 ft 2 in (1.88 m)	—	Jr
F		Fred Franks	6 ft 5 in (1.96 m)	—
G		Harold Krafchick	5 ft 11 in (1.8 m)	—
		John Hart	6 ft 0 in (1.83 m)	—

Head coach

Harbin Lawson

Assistant coach(es)

Legend

- (C) Team captain
- (S) Suspended
- (I) Ineligible
- (W) Walk-on
- Injured
- Current redshirt

== Schedule ==
Date time, TV	Opponent	Result	Record	Site city, state
12/2/1957	at South Carolina	L 87-95	0–1	
12/4/1957	at Clemson	W 72-60	1–1	
12/7/1957	Florida	W 66-60	2–1	Athens, GA
12/19/1957	at Georgia Tech	W 69-68	3–1	
12/21/1957	at Vanderbilt	L 64-74	3–2	
12/30/1957	South Carolina	W 77-58	4–2	Athens, GA
12/31/1957	Florida	L 63-76	4–3	Athens, GA
1/1/1958	Spring Hill	L 67-69	4–4	Athens, GA
1/2/1958	Florida State	L 80-92	4–5	Athens, GA
1/4/1958	at LSU	W 59-56	5–5	
1/6/1958	at Tulane	L 59-67	5–6	
1/11/1958	Alabama	L 58-72	5–7	Athens, GA
1/14/1958	at Mercer	L 69-76	5–8	
1/20/1958	at Georgia Tech	L 59-72	5–9	
1/25/1958	at Auburn	L 62-90	5–10	
1/28/1958	South Carolina	W 84-63	6–10	Athens, GA
1/29/1958	Kentucky	L 55-74	6–11	Athens, GA
2/1/1958	Tennessee	L 79-82	6–12	Athens, GA
2/8/1958	Auburn	L 73-75	6–13	Athens, GA
2/10/1958	at Alabama	L 64-68	6–14	
2/15/1958	at Ole Miss	L 63-81	6–15	
2/17/1958	at Mississippi State	L 77-92	6–16	
2/22/1958	Georgia Tech	W 62-59	7–16	Athens, GA
2/24/1958	Vanderbilt	L 66-69	7–17	Athens, GA
3/1/1958	at Florida	L 73-90	7–18	
3/3/1958	at Florida State	L 77-85	7–19	
*Non-conference game. (#) Tournament seedings in parentheses.
