= 1957–58 Kansas State Wildcats men's basketball team =

American college basketball season

1957–58 Kansas State Wildcats men's basketball

Big Eight Champions

NCAA tournament, Fourth Place
- Conference: Big Eight Conference

Ranking
- Coaches: No. 4
- AP: No. 3
- Record: 22–5 (10–2 Big Eight)
- Head coach: Tex Winter (5th season)
- Home arena: Ahearn Field House

1957–58 Big Eight Conference men's basketball standings
	Conf.				Overall
Team	W		L	PCT	W		L	PCT
No. 3 Kansas State	10	–	2	.833	22	–	5	.815
No. 7 Kansas	8	–	4	.667	18	–	5	.783
Iowa State	8	–	4	.667	15	–	8	.652
Oklahoma	5	–	7	.417	13	–	10	.565
Nebraska	5	–	7	.417	10	–	13	.435
Missouri	3	–	9	.250	9	–	13	.409
Colorado	3	–	9	.250	8	–	15	.348
Rankings from AP Poll

The 1957–58 Kansas State Wildcats men's basketball team represented Kansas State University as a member of the Big 7 Conference during the 1957–58 NCAA University Division men's basketball season. The head coach was Tex Winter, innovator of the Triangle offense and future member of the Basketball Hall of Fame, who was in his fifth season at the helm. The Wildcats finished with a record of 22–5 (10–2 Big 7) and reached the Final Four.

The team played its home games at Ahearn Field House in Manhattan, Kansas.

== Roster ==
1957–58 Kansas State Wildcats men's basketball team
Players
Coaches

Pos.	#	Name	Height	Weight	Year	Previous school	Hometown
F	4	Bill Guthridge	5 ft 10 in (1.78 m)	160 lb (73 kg)	So	Parsons JC	Parsons, Kansas
G/F	10	Roy DeWitz	6 ft 3 in (1.91 m)	183 lb (83 kg)	Sr	Barrington	Barrington, Illinois
G	12	Sonny Ballard	6 ft 0 in (1.83 m)	160 lb (73 kg)	So	—	Manhattan, Kansas
G	14	Steve Douglas	6 ft 4 in (1.93 m)	—	So	—	Manhattan, Kansas
G	20	Don Matuszak	6 ft 0 in (1.83 m)	—	Jr	Morton	Cicero, Illinois
G	24	Hayden Abbott	6 ft 3 in (1.91 m)	—	Sr	—	Olathe, Kansas
F	30	Bob Boozer	6 ft 8 in (2.03 m)	210 lb (95 kg)	Jr	Omaha Tech	Omaha, Nebraska
C	32	Jack Parr	6 ft 9 in (2.06 m)	215 lb (98 kg)	Sr	St. Christopher's	Richmond, Virginia
F	34	Wally Frank	6 ft 8 in (2.03 m)	—	So	—	Norton, Kansas
G	35	Don Richards	6 ft 1 in (1.85 m)	160 lb (73 kg)	Sr	—	Bonnie, Illinois
F	40	Glen Long	6 ft 4 in (1.93 m)	—	So	—	Topeka, Kansas
F	42	Howie Rice	6 ft 7 in (2.01 m)	—	So	—	Paoli, Pennsylvania
F	44	Larry Fischer	6 ft 4 in (1.93 m)	—	Sr	—	Pratt, Kansas
G	50	Jim Holwerda	6 ft 0 in (1.83 m)	—	Jr	—	Lindsborg, Kansas
G	52	Bill Laude	6 ft 4 in (1.93 m)	—	So	Rockford	Rockford, Illinois

Head coach

- Tex Winter (USC)

Assistant coach(es)

- Howie Shannon (Kansas State)

Legend

- (C) Team captain
- (S) Suspended
- (I) Ineligible
- (W) Walk-on
- Injured
- Current redshirt

Roster

== Schedule and results ==
Date time, TV	Rank^{#}	Opponent^{#}	Result	Record	Site city, state
Non-conference regular season
Dec 3, 1957*		Texas-El Paso	W 76–31	1–0	Ahearn Field House; Manhattan, Kansas
Dec 7, 1957*		at Indiana	W 66–61	2–0	The Fieldhouse; Bloomington, Indiana
Dec 9, 1957*	No. 5	at Purdue	W 79–73	3–0	Lambert Fieldhouse; West Lafayette, Indiana
Dec 14, 1957*	No. 5	Iowa	W 86–69	4–0	Ahearn Field House; Manhattan, Kansas
Dec 16, 1957*	No. 5	at Arkansas	W 63–48	5–0	Barnhill Arena; Fayetteville, Arkansas
Dec 20, 1957*	No. 3	vs. California; Washington Tournament	W 58–44	6–0	Hec Edmundson Pavilion; Seattle, Washington
Dec 21, 1957*	No. 3	at Washington; Washington Tournament	W 70–63	7–0	Hec Edmundson Pavilion; Seattle, Washington
Dec 27, 1957	No. 3	vs. Missouri; Big Seven Holiday Tournament	W 60–51	8–0	Municipal Auditorium; Kansas City, Missouri
Dec 28, 1957	No. 3	vs. Nebraska; Big Seven Holiday Tournament	W 88–57	9–0	Municipal Auditorium; Kansas City, Missouri
Dec 30, 1957*	No. 3	vs. No. 2 Kansas; Big Seven Holiday Tournament	L 65–79	9–1	Municipal Auditorium; Kansas City, Missouri
Jan 6, 1958*	No. 2	Minnesota	W 72–71	10–1	Ahearn Field House; Manhattan, Kansas
Big Seven Regular season
Jan 11, 1958	No. 4	Nebraska	W 74–59	11–1 (1–0)	Ahearn Field House; Manhattan, Kansas
Jan 18, 1958	No. 2	at No. 14 Oklahoma	W 64–60	12–1 (2–0)	Field House; Norman, Oklahoma
Jan 25, 1958	No. 3	at Iowa State	W 64–54	13–1 (3–0)	Iowa State Armory; Ames, Iowa
Feb 1, 1958	No. 4	Colorado	W 83–54	14–1 (4–0)	Ahearn Field House; Manhattan, Kansas
Feb 3, 1958	No. 4	at No. 2 Kansas; Sunflower Showdown	W 79–75 ^{2OT}	15–1 (5–0)	Allen Fieldhouse; Lawrence, Kansas
Feb 8, 1958	No. 4	Iowa State	W 77–70	16–1 (6–0)	Ahearn Field House; Manhattan, Kansas
Feb 15, 1958	No. 1	at Colorado	W 68–62	17–1 (7–0)	Balch Fieldhouse; Boulder, Colorado
Feb 22, 1958	No. 1	at Missouri	W 82–61	18–1 (8–0)	Brewer Fieldhouse; Columbia, Missouri
Feb 25, 1958	No. 1	Oklahoma	W 68–51	19–1 (9–0)	Ahearn Field House; Manhattan, Kansas
Mar 1, 1958	No. 1	Missouri	W 86–75	20–1 (10–0)	Ahearn Field House; Manhattan, Kansas
Mar 3, 1958	No. 1	at Nebraska	L 48–55	20–2 (10–1)	Nebraska Coliseum; Lincoln, Nebraska
Mar 8, 1958	No. 1	No. 10 Kansas; Sunflower Showdown	L 44–61	20–3 (10–2)	Ahearn Field House; Manhattan, Kansas
NCAA Tournament
Mar 14, 1958*	No. 3	vs. No. 2 Cincinnati; Midwest Regional semifinal	W 83–80 ^{2OT}	21–3	Allen Fieldhouse; Lawrence, Kansas
Mar 15, 1958*	No. 3	vs. No. 19 Oklahoma State; Midwest Regional final	W 69–57	22–3	Allen Fieldhouse; Lawrence, Kansas
Mar 21, 1958*	No. 3	vs. No. 18 Seattle; National semifinal	L 51–73	22–4	Freedom Hall; Louisville, Kentucky
Mar 22, 1958*	No. 3	vs. No. 5 Temple; National consolation Game – Third Place	L 57–67	22–5	Freedom Hall; Louisville, Kentucky
*Non-conference game. ^{#}Rankings from AP Poll. (#) Tournament seedings in parentheses. MW=Midwest.

== Rankings ==
Ranking movements Legend: ██ Increase in ranking ██ Decrease in ranking
	Week													
Poll	1	2	3	4	5	6	7	8	9	10	11	12	13	Final
AP	5	3	3	3	4	2	3	4	4	1	1	1	1	3
Coaches	6	3	2	2	5	4	4	5	4	1	1	1	1	4

== Awards and honors ==
- Bob Boozer – Consensus First-team All-American, Big Seven Player of the Year
- Tex Winter – UPI College Basketball Coach of the Year, Big Seven Coach of the Year

== Team players drafted into the NBA ==
Round	Pick	Player	NBA club
10	70	Jack Parr	Cincinnati Royals
