= 1957–58 Idaho Vandals men's basketball team =

American college basketball season

1957–58 Idaho Vandals men's basketball
- Conference: Pacific Coast Conference
- Record: 17–9 (9–7 PCC)
- Head coach: Harlan Hodges (4th season)
- Assistant coaches: Clem Parberry; Wayne Anderson (Frosh)
- MVP: Gary Simmons
- Home arena: Memorial Gymnasium

1957–58 Pacific Coast Conference men's basketball standings
	Conf.				Overall
Team	W		L	PCT	W		L	PCT
California †	12	–	4	.750	19	–	9	.679
Oregon State	12	–	4	.750	20	–	6	.769
UCLA	10	–	6	.625	16	–	10	.615
Idaho	9	–	7	.563	17	–	9	.654
USC	8	–	8	.500	12	–	13	.480
Stanford	7	–	9	.438	12	–	13	.480
Oregon	6	–	10	.375	13	–	11	.542
Washington	5	–	11	.313	8	–	18	.308
Washington State	3	–	13	.188	7	–	19	.269
† Conference playoff game winner Rankings from AP Poll

The 1957–58 Idaho Vandals men's basketball team represented the University of Idaho during the 1957–58 NCAA University Division basketball season. Members of the Pacific Coast Conference, the Vandals were led by fourth-year head coach Harlan Hodges and played their home games on campus at Memorial Gymnasium in Moscow, Idaho.

The Vandals were 17–9 overall and 9–7 in conference play in the penultimate season of the PCC.

Idaho played two home games in southern Idaho on consecutive nights in late December, both victories over Utah State, in Twin Falls and Idaho Falls.

Senior guard Gary Simmons of Twin Falls was the UI's first All-American.
