= Tex Winter =

American basketball coach (1922–2018)

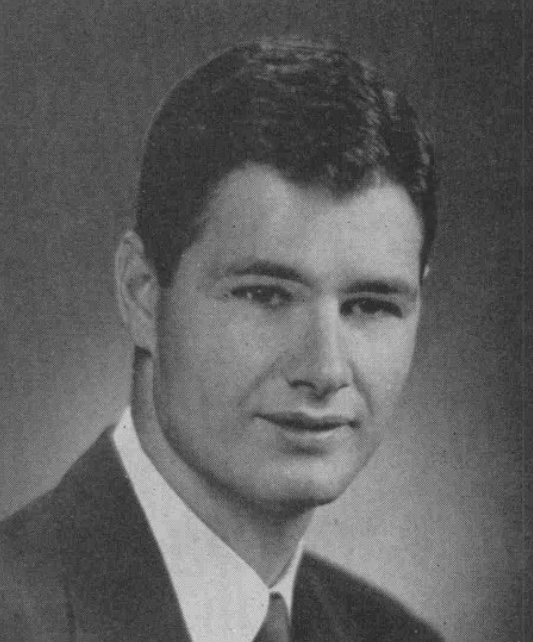
- Winter with Marquette in 1953

Biographical details
- Born: February 25, 1922 near Wellington, Texas, U.S.
- Died: October 10, 2018 (aged 96); Manhattan, Kansas, U.S.

Playing career
- 1940–1942: Compton JC
- 1942–1943: Oregon State
- 1946–1947: USC

Coaching career (HC unless noted)
- 1947–1951: Kansas State (assistant)
- 1951–1953: Marquette
- 1953–1968: Kansas State
- 1968–1971: Washington
- 1971–1973: Houston Rockets
- 1973–1978: Northwestern
- 1978–1983: Long Beach State
- 1983–1984: LSU (assistant)
- 1985–1999: Chicago Bulls (assistant)
- 1999–2004: Los Angeles Lakers (assistant)

Head coaching record
- Overall: 453–334 (college); 51–78 (NBA)

Accomplishments and honors

Championships
- As head coach: 2 NCAA Regional – Final Four (1959, 1964); 8× Big Seven/Big Eight regular season (1956, 1958–1961, 1963, 1964, 1968); As assistant coach: 9× NBA champion (1991–1993, 1996–1998, 2000–2002); Chuck Daly Lifetime Achievement Award (2010)

Awards
- UPI College Basketball Coach of the Year (1958); 4× Big Eight Conference Coach of the Year (1958–1960, 1968)
- Basketball Hall of Fame; Inducted in 2011
- College Basketball Hall of Fame; Inducted in 2010

Morice Fredrick "Tex" Winter (February 25, 1922 – October 10, 2018) was an American basketball coach and innovator of the triangle offense, an offensive system that became the dominant force in the National Basketball Association (NBA) and resulted in 11 NBA Championships with the Chicago Bulls in the 1990s and the Los Angeles Lakers in the 2000s under head coach Phil Jackson, with Winter an assistant coach to Jackson on the first nine of those championship teams; and a consultant for the 2008-09 Lakers' championship team. In 2002, after the Lakers won their third consecutive NBA championship, the team made rings for the players and coaches honoring Winter. On the front of the jewel-encrusted ring was a design with several triangles, honoring Winter’s triangle offense.

Winter was inducted into the Naismith Memorial Basketball Hall of Fame in 2011. In 2016, the NBA Coaches Association created the annually presented Tex Winter Assistant Coach Lifetime Impact Award in his honor. In 2010, he was given the Chuck Daly Lifetime Achievement Award by the NBA Coaches Association. In 1998, Winter was awarded the John Bunn Award for lifetime achievement from the Naismith Basketball Hall of Fame.

Winter was a head coach in college basketball for 30 years. He was the youngest head coach in major college basketball for a number of years, and during his 15 years coaching Kansas State University he went to the NCAA Division I men's basketball tournament Final Four twice (1958 and 1964), won eight conference titles, and had nearly a 70 percent winning percentage. In March 1958, he was voted the United Press college Coach of the Year. Winter was selected the Big Eight Coach of the Year at Kansas State three consecutive seasons (1957 to 1960), and again in his final season in the Big Eight (1967–68).

Winter has been inducted into the National Collegiate Basketball Hall of Fame (2010), Kansas State Athletics Hall of Fame (1991), USC Athletics Hall of Fame (2003), PAC-12 Hall of Honor (2003), Kansas Sports Hall of Fame (1997), and Compton Community College Athletics Hall of Fame (2012). In 2003, Kansas State fans voted him the Kansas State basketball coach of the century.

In 1947, as a college basketball player Winter received the University of Southern California's (USC) Ernie Holbrook memorial trophy for the most inspirational player on the Trojan basketball team. He was an outstanding pole vaulter at every college he attended, and prior to World War II was considered a candidate in the pole vault for the United States Olympic Team in the 1944 Olympics (which never took place).

== Early life ==
Winter was born on February 25, 1922, near Wellington, Texas, 15 minutes after twin sister Mona Francis. Winter grew up in an unpainted shack just outside of Wellington, located in the Texas panhandle, during the Dust Bowl. The Winter family moved to Lubbock, Texas in 1929. Winter's father was a mechanic. When Winter was seven or eight years old living in Lubbock, his father died from an infection after being speared by a marlin while fishing. Winter's older brother Ernest Winter became a father figure to Winter. Winter had to work while in elementary school to help feed his family, one such job being to collect boxes for a local baker in exchange for day-old bread.

In 1936, Winter moved with his mother and twin sister to Huntington Park, California. His older sister Elizabeth had already married and earlier moved to California, and encouraged them to join her there. Winter's mother worked in Huntington Park as a clothing store sales manager. Winter's older brother Ernest was a football star in high school, and remained in Texas to finish high school. Winter worked on a truck farm when he first arrived in California, bringing overripe fruit home to the family. His Texas birth and drawl was the source of Winter's later nickname "Tex", given to him after his family moved to California.

Winter played three years on Huntington Park High School's basketball team. While Winter was attending Huntington Park, the Loyola University of Los Angeles (now Loyola Marymount University) basketball team practiced at his high school. Along with Phil Woolpert and Pete Newell, Winter was a ball boy for Loyola University. Winter carefully studied Loyola coach Jimmy Needles’s reverse action offense, which was an early template of the later triangle offense. Both Woolpert and Newell would become Hall of Fame head coaches.

== College ==
Winter attended Compton Junior College and Oregon State University (then Oregon State College), before joining the United States Navy during World War II. After completing his military service, Winter attended the University of Southern California.

After graduation from high school in 1940, Winter attended college at Compton Junior College for two years, where he became a renowned pole vaulter. He also played on Compton's basketball team, along with a number of players with whom he had played at Huntington Park High who likewise attended Compton. He played guard in basketball and was a leading scorer at Compton.

It has been stated that Winter earned a pole-vaulting scholarship to Oregon State University (1942). It has also been stated he went to Oregon State on a basketball scholarship. At the time he transferred in 1942–43, Winter was described as being a "basketball transfer" from Compton to Oregon State, playing under basketball coach Slats Gill; and that Oregon State's track coach (Doc Grant Swan) did not realize he was going to be getting a top pole vaulter for the track and field team. Winter was on both the basketball and track and field teams at Oregon State. As a pole vaulter, Winter competed against Bob Richards, a 1948 and 1952 Olympian. Winters was considered a strong candidate for the US Olympic Team in 1944, but the Olympics were cancelled by World War II.

== Naval service ==
Winter met his wife Nancy Bohnenkamp at Oregon State. Both of them entered the United States Navy in 1942 or in early 1943, during World War II, with Winter going into fighter pilot/aviator training and his wife joining the WAVES in hopes they would be stationed near each other. Winter's brother Ernest was a Navy pilot in the China-Burma theater during World War II, and Ernest Winter became the first pilot to walk out of China after having his plane shot down (walking over 600 miles); and was a recipient of the Distinguished Flying Cross. After Winter's pilot's wings were conferred he was assigned to fighter pilot duty in the Pacific. However, his orders were rescinded after his brother's plane was shot down.

It is reported that Winter was stationed in a number of locations after he joined the Navy: Illinois, Wisconsin, Iowa, and Texas. He was reportedly first stationed at Monmouth College in Illinois, along with a number of other Oregon State varsity basketball players, in a program to become ensigns. Winter also said he was first stationed in Sanford, Florida. Winter was next assigned as a naval trainee in Wisconsin early in World War II, and played basketball on an air cadet team there. It was reported that during the late fall and early winter of 1943–44, while serving as a Navy cadet in Wisconsin, Winter played guard for Marquette University's basketball team in Milwaukee and earned a varsity letter, playing under head coach W. S. "Bill" Chandler (whom he would later replace as head coach in 1951). After Marquette, Winter played basketball for Iowa Pre-Flight while assigned to the Ottumwa Naval Air Station (NAS Ottumwa) in Iowa, in 1944. While stationed at NAS Ottumwa in late April 1944, Winter also competed in the Drake Relays and tied for second in the pole vault.

After the war, Winter was assigned to NAS Corpus Christi as a test pilot for an experimental jet craft. Four of the eight test pilots died. Winter continued to play basketball for the Navy on a team in Corpus Christi, after playing for Marquette and Iowa Pre-Flight.

While in the Navy, Winter's commanding officer Chuck Taylor (later famous for developing the Converse sneaker) recommended Winter as a starting guard for his Navy basketball team. Winter left the Navy with the rank of ensign in 1946. It is also stated that he was discharged from the Navy in 1945. In 1945–46, before re-entering college, Winter played Amateur Athletic Union (AAU) basketball for the Los Angeles Carroll's Shamrocks. He became a flight instructor in Texas after being discharged, and was recruited there by University of Southern California head basketball coach Sam Barry.

== Post-war college ==
Winter returned to college after the war at the University of Southern California (1946–47), where he learned the triangle offense from his coach Sam Barry, or as stated elsewhere, Winter learned the fundamentals of Barry's system from which Winter himself would devise the triangle offense. The Naismith Hall of Fame has said the triangle offense evolved in part from Barry's center-opposite offense. Winter saw similarities between Barry's offense and the offense he had seen Loyola use when he was in high school.

In March 1947, United Press named him honorable mention All-Pacific Coast Conference in basketball, at guard; and second-team All-Pacific Coast Conference southern division. In April 1947, Winter was the inaugural recipient of USC's Ernie Holbrook memorial trophy for the most inspirational player on the Trojan basketball team.

At USC, Winter was a basketball teammate of Bill Sharman, Alex Hannum, and Gene Rock, future professional basketball players. Like Winter, Sharman and Hannum would go on to be Hall of Fame coaches, though Winter, in a rarity, went in for his contributions as an assistant coach.

At USC, Winter was also on the track team, and was named an All-American as a pole vaulter. In June 1946, he had won the junior Amateur Athletic Union pole vault championship, as a member of the Los Angeles Athletic Club.

== College coaching career ==
After graduating college in 1947, Winter immediately became interested in coaching (both in basketball and track). He entered the coaching profession as an assistant to future Naismith Hall of Fame head basketball coach Jack Gardner at Kansas State University (K-State or Kansas State), a position Winter held from 1947 to 1951. His college coach Sam Barry had urged Winter to pursue the position at Kansas State under Gardner, whom Barry had also coached. It was as an assistant at Kansas State where Winter began to devise the triangle offense. Winter later said that trying to get Gardner to use Winter's "triple-post offense" was one of the hardest things he had ever done. He was Gardner's assistant in 1948 and 1951 when the team went to the Final Four of the NCAA Division I men's basketball tournament.

In 1952, Winter began a two-year stint as head coach at Marquette University, becoming the youngest coach in major college basketball. In 1953, Winter returned to Kansas State as its head coach; at 31, still the youngest major college coach. Winter served as Kansas State's head coach for the next 15 years, posting a 261–118 (.689) record, though his record has also been reported as 262-117 (.691). From 1957 to 1960, Winter was named the Big Eight's Coach of the Year three consecutive seasons; and in Winter's final season at K-State (1967–68), the team was first in the Big Eight and the Associated Press (AP) named him Big Eight Coach of the Year once again. He still owns the record for most conference titles (eight) in school history and twice led the Wildcats to the Final Four (1958 and 1964). Winter guided K-State to postseason play seven times overall, including six trips to the NCAA tournament, and boasts one of the highest winning percentages in K-State's history.

Winter was named United Press's college Coach of the Year in March 1958. In the 1958 NCAA tournament, Winter led third-ranked Kansas State to the Final Four by defeating Oscar Robertson and second-ranked Cincinnati in an 83–80 overtime thriller, ending Cincinnati's 16-game winning streak. Junior center Bob Boozer was one of three Wildcats to be named a first-team All-American, along with teammates Jack Parr and Roy DeWitz who were also named All-Americans. Boozer, Parr and DeWitz were all named to the Midwest-Lawrence All-Regional NCAA team that year. Earlier in the season, on February 3, 1958, then No. 4 ranked Kansas State defeated Wilt Chamberlain and the No. 2 ranked University of Kansas in double overtime, using a defensive scheme Winter devised to impede Chamberlain's offense.

K-State advanced to their fourth Final Four in 1964. Winter's Wildcats defeated Texas Western and then upset the favored No. 6 ranked Wichita State to advance to the Final Four at Municipal Auditorium in Kansas City, Missouri. Winter's use of a 1–3–1 zone defense against Wichita State's offense was a key factor in Kansas State's victory. Another key factor was Winter's using forward Jeff Simons to bring the ball up the court to defuse the effectiveness of Wichita State's full-court press on Kansas State's guards. Larry Weigel, a guard on that Kansas State team, said that this offensive strategy was an example of Winter's great gift as a coach for reading what was occurring in a game and making effective adjustments at halftime to improve his team's play. Two-time Big Eight selection Willie Murrell averaged 25.3 points per game during Kansas State's run to the Final Four, which ended in a 90–84 loss to eventual national champion UCLA. It was the first of UCLA's nine NCAA championships over the next 10 years.

In 1962, Winter wrote the book The Triple-Post Offense, about the triangle offense – the offense which he developed and utilized with such success at Kansas State. Following his leaving Kansas State, turning over the head coaching position to his assistant Cotton Fitzsimmons, Winter also served as head coach at the University of Washington (1968 to 1971, where he was hired by then Athletic Director Joseph Kearney); Northwestern University (1973 to 1978); and Long Beach State (1979 to 1983). Winter was considering retirement at age 61 when Louisiana State University (LSU) head coach Dale Brown, whom Winter had befriended when Brown was a high school basketball coach, convinced Winter to come to LSU as an assistant coach and consultant for one season (1983–84).

In 30 years as a college head coach, Winter compiled a career record of 453–334 or 451–336.

== Professional coaching ==
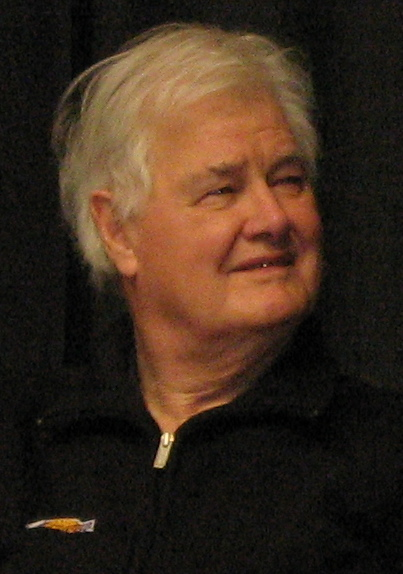
Winter in 2009

=== Leones de Ponce ===
Winter coached Leones de Ponce (basketball) in 1952, winning the Baloncesto Superior Nacional (BSN) championship in Puerto Rican summer league basketball. The team was coached by Howie Shannon in 1953 and Joe Thornton in 1954. Winter coached Pachin Vicens in Puerto Rico in 1952, BSN's most valuable player, and Winter later coached Vicens at Marquette and Kansas State. In addition to coaching Ponces in 1953 (also coaching Vicens), Shannon coached high school basketball in Topeka, Kansas. In March 1954, Winter hired Shannon as an assistant basketball coach at Kansas State.

=== NBA ===
Winter was hired by Pete Newell as head coach of the Houston Rockets for two seasons, 1971 to 1973, posting a 51–78 (.395) record. Winter replaced his old USC teammate, Alex Hannum. Winter was fired and replaced by assistant coach Johnny Egan on January 21, 1973. The trading of Elvin Hayes to the Baltimore Bullets prior to the 1972–73 season and the Rockets' subsequent subpar performance were factors in his dismissal.

In 1985, Winter started another chapter of his life after contemplating retirement, serving as an assistant coach with the Chicago Bulls. He was hired for that position by general manager Jerry Krause, who first met Winter at Kansas State while Krause was working as a professional scout, and developed a lasting impression of Winter's exceptional basketball knowledge. Decades later, in convincing Bulls' owner Jerry Reinsdorf to hire Winter, Krause told Reinsdorf (who also owned the Chicago White Sox baseball team) that Winter was "'the Charlie Lau of basketball'". Winter originally worked under Bulls' head coaches Stan Albeck (1985–86) and Doug Collins (1986 to 1989). Although Winter would later gain fame implementing the triangle offense with Michael Jordan and the Bulls, during Winter's first four years in Chicago neither Albeck nor Collins were interested in Winter's triangle offense.

In 1987, Phil Jackson became an assistant coach to Collins for the next two seasons alongside Winter (1987–88 and 1988–89). Winter became a mentor to Jackson. Before the 1989–90 season, Jackson replaced Collins as head coach, and Winter became an assistant coach to Jackson. Jackson and Winter had discussed the triangle offense as assistant coaches under Collins (who used a more individualized approach on offense centered on Jordan). Unlike Collins, Jackson believed in the value of Winter's triangle offense. In becoming head coach, Jackson made Winter his offensive coordinator to implement the triangle offense. With Jordan and future Hall of Fame forward Scottie Pippen keying the triangle offense, Winter and his ball-movement offense were an integral part of the Bulls' NBA championships in 1991, 1992, 1993, 1996, 1997, and 1998.

Winter followed Jackson to the Los Angeles Lakers in June 1999, when Jackson was named the Lakers new head coach. Shortly after Jackson had decided to take the Lakers' head coaching job, he had asked Winter to join him as an assistant coach. The 78-year old Winter and Jackson were very close, and Winter said during that season, "'The reason I've stayed with it is because he said he needed me, and you like to be needed . . . I would have been retired a long long time ago if not for Phil Jackson'". One Los Angeles area sportswriter (Phil Osterholt) predicted that the Lakers would become NBA champions not because of Jackson's coaching, but because of "Tex Winter's Triangle Offense".

The Lakers were NBA champions in Jackson's and Winter's first season with the team (1999–2000), using the triangle offense. The team included that season's Most Valuable Player and future Hall of Fame center Shaquille O'Neal, as well as future Hall of Fame shooting guard Kobe Bryant. Still led by O'Neal and Bryant, the Lakers won NBA championships in the next two seasons (2001 and 2002). In 2002, after the Lakers won their third consecutive NBA championship, the team made rings for the players and coaches honoring Winter. On the front of the jewel-encrusted ring was a design with several triangles, honoring Winter’s triangle offense.

Winter remained an assistant coach with the Lakers two more seasons. When he retired in 2004, the 82-year old Winter had coached for 57 consecutive seasons, believed to be a record at the time. He subsequently did consulting work in the NBA, and was a consultant for the NBA champion 2008–09 Los Angeles Lakers, at the age of 87. He was with Jackson for 10 of Jackson's 11 NBA championships with teams using the triangle offense.

== Legacy and honors ==
On Winter's eighth time on the final ballot for the Naismith Basketball Hall of Fame, it was announced on April 2, 2011, that Winter had been elected. He was formally inducted on August 12, with his Boston-based physicist son Chris giving a speech in his behalf. In 2016, the NBA Coaches Association established The Tex Winter Assistant Coach Lifetime Impact Award, presented annually to a storied assistant coach who has consistently made a substantial impact over at least fifteen years. The award "honors the career of Hall of Famer Tex Winter who over an outstanding NBA coaching career set a standard of loyalty, integrity, competitive excellence and tireless promotion of NBA basketball". In June 2010, he was given the Chuck Daly Lifetime Achievement Award, along with Hall of Fame coach Dr. Jack Ramsay, by the NBA Coaches Association. In 1998, Winter was awarded the John Bunn Award for lifetime achievement from the Naismith Basketball Hall of Fame.

Winter is a member of several other Halls of Fame, including the Kansas State Athletics Hall of Fame (1991), the USC Athletics Hall of Fame (2003), the Kansas Sports Hall of Fame (1997), and the National Collegiate Basketball Hall of Fame (2010). On May 26, 2012, Winter was inducted into the Compton Community College Athletics Hall of Fame, under the category of Basketball. He is also a member of the PAC-12 Hall of Honor (2003). In 2003, Kansas State fans voted him the Kansas State basketball coach of the century. In 2015, Kansas State renamed the road leading to the team's arena and practice facility for Winter.

In Winter's view, team play was primary and individual play secondary. He coached both Michael Jordan, who is often considered the greatest player in NBA history; as well as Shaquille O'Neal and Kobe Bryant, often considered among the top 10 to 15 players in NBA history. Winter was willing to criticize Jordan and Bryant directly if he believed they were not playing properly in executing the offense. Winter had a bond with Kobe Bryant, helping Bryant understand the value of playing within the team's system. They watched hours of film together. In 2004, Bryant said his progress as a player was attributable to Jackson and Winter.

Jordan respected Winter because of Winter's only being satisfied if things were done correctly. Jordan learned a great deal from Winter, finding him to be a teacher and tireless worker, with a focus on details and preparation. At the time of Winter's death, Jordan said "'I learned so much from coach Winter . . . He was a pioneer and true student of the game of basketball. His triangle offense was a huge part of our six championships with the Bulls. He was a tireless worker, always focused on details and preparation, and a great teacher . . . I was lucky to play for him'".

Steve Kerr, who played under Winter with the Chicago Bulls and later won multiple championships as head coach of the Golden State Warriors, said of Winter "'He was a man of principle, a man of humor . . . He loved the game, and lived an incredible basketball life at every level'".

== Personal life and death ==
Winter and Nancy had three sons (Brian, Chris, and Russ). After he retired from coaching in 2004, Winter and Nancy moved to Oregon. He and Nancy were married for 72 years at the time of Winter's death. On April 25, 2009, Winter suffered a stroke in Manhattan, Kansas, while attending a Kansas State 50th basketball reunion. After the stroke, in 2009 he was living in an apartment with the Alzheimer's-stricken Nancy in Oregon. Winter was in a nursing home in Oregon in early 2010 when his son Brian moved Winter and his mother Nancy to Brian's home in Manhattan (near the Kansas State campus).

Winter suffered from the after-effects of his 2009 stroke, including an uncooperative right side and nerve pain in his neck and shoulder. Even after his stroke, Winter was able to attend a number of Kansas State basketball games each season. He died on October 10, 2018, at the age of 96, in Manhattan, Kansas.

== Head coaching record ==
=== College ===
Record table
Season	Team	Overall	Conference	Standing	Postseason
Marquette Golden Eagles (Independent) (1951–1953)
1951–52	Marquette	12–14			
1952–53	Marquette	13–11			Won the National Catholic Invitational Tournament (NCIT)
Marquette:		25–25 (.500)			
Kansas State Wildcats (Big Seven / Big Eight Conference) (1953–1968)
1953–54	Kansas State	11–10	5–7	T–4th	
1954–55	Kansas State	11–10	6–6	T–3rd	
1955–56	Kansas State	17–8	9–3	1st	NCAA Sweet 16
1956–57	Kansas State	15–8	8–4	2nd	
1957–58	Kansas State	22–5	10–2	1st	NCAA University Division Final Four
1958–59	Kansas State	25–2	14–0	1st	NCAA University Division Elite Eight
1959–60	Kansas State	16–10	10–4	T–1st	
1960–61	Kansas State	22–5*	13–1*	1st	NCAA University Division Elite Eight
1961–62	Kansas State	22–3	12–2	2nd	
1962–63	Kansas State	16–9	11–3	T–1st	
1963–64	Kansas State	22–7	12–2	1st	NCAA University Division Final Four
1964–65	Kansas State	12–13	5–9	T–6th	
1965–66	Kansas State	14–11	9–5	3rd	
1966–67	Kansas State	17–8	9–5	4th	
1967–68	Kansas State	19–9	11–3	1st	NCAA University Division Sweet 16
Kansas State:		261–118 (.689)	154–57 (.730)		
Washington Huskies (Pacific-8 Conference) (1968–1971)
1968–69	Washington	13–13	6–8	4th	
1969–70	Washington	17–9	7–7	5th	
1970–71	Washington	15–13	6–8	5th	
Washington:		45–35 (.563)	19–23 (.452)		
Northwestern Wildcats (Big Ten Conference) (1973–1978)
1973–74	Northwestern	9–15	3–11	9th	
1974–75	Northwestern	6–20	4–14	T–9th	
1975–76	Northwestern	12–15	7–11	T–7th	
1976–77	Northwestern	9–18	7–11	T–7th	
1977–78	Northwestern	8–19	4–14	T–9th	
Northwestern:		44–87 (.336)	25–61 (.291)		
Long Beach State 49ers (Pacific Coast Athletic Association) (1978–1983)
1978–79	Long Beach State	16–12	7–7	4th	
1979–80	Long Beach State	22–12	11–3	2nd	NIT second round
1980–81	Long Beach State	15–13	9–5	T–3rd	
1981–82	Long Beach State	12–16	7–7	T–4th	
1982–83	Long Beach State	13–16	6–10	7th	
Long Beach State:		78–69 (.531)	40–32 (.556)		
Total:		453–334 (.576)			
National champion Postseason invitational champion Conference regular season champion Conference regular season and conference tournament champion Division regular season champion Division regular season and conference tournament champion Conference tournament champion

*1960–61 record reflects one win by forfeit over Colorado.

=== NBA ===
Legend
Regular season	G	Games coached	W	Games won	L	Games lost	W–L %	Win–loss %
Playoffs	PG	Playoff games	PW	Playoff wins	PL	Playoff losses	PW–L %	Playoff win–loss %

Team	Year	G	W	L	W–L%	Finish	PG	PW	PL	PW–L%	Result
Houston	1971–72	82	34	48	.415	4th in Pacific	–	–	–	–	Missed Playoffs
Houston	1972–73	47	17	30	.362	3rd in Central	–	–	–	–	–
Career		129	51	78	.395		–	–	–	–	

== Publications ==
- Winter, Fred (1962). The Triple-Post Offense. Prentice-Hall.

== See also ==
- List of NCAA Division I Men's Final Four appearances by coach
