= 1957–58 Washington State Cougars men's basketball team =

American college basketball season

1957–58 Washington State Cougars men's basketball
- Conference: Pacific Coast Conference
- Record: 7–19 (3–13 PCC)
- Head coach: Jack Friel (30th season)
- Home arena: Bohler Gymnasium

1957–58 Pacific Coast Conference men's basketball standings
	Conf.				Overall
Team	W		L	PCT	W		L	PCT
California †	12	–	4	.750	19	–	9	.679
Oregon State	12	–	4	.750	20	–	6	.769
UCLA	10	–	6	.625	16	–	10	.615
Idaho	9	–	7	.563	17	–	9	.654
USC	8	–	8	.500	12	–	13	.480
Stanford	7	–	9	.438	12	–	13	.480
Oregon	6	–	10	.375	13	–	11	.542
Washington	5	–	11	.313	8	–	18	.308
Washington State	3	–	13	.188	7	–	19	.269
† Conference playoff game winner Rankings from AP Poll

The 1957–58 Washington State Cougars men's basketball team represented Washington State College for the 1957–58 NCAA college basketball season. Led by thirtieth-year head coach Jack Friel, the Cougars were members of the Pacific Coast Conference and played their home games on campus at Bohler Gymnasium in Pullman, Washington.

The Cougars were 7–19 overall in the regular season and 3–13 in conference play, last in the standings.

This was Friel's final season as head coach.
