= 1957–58 Duke Blue Devils men's basketball team =

American college basketball season

1957–58 Duke Blue Devils men's basketball

ACC Season Champions
- Conference: Atlantic Coast Conference

Ranking
- Coaches: No. 13
- AP: No. 10
- Record: 18–7 (11–3 ACC)
- Head coach: Harold Bradley
- Assistant coach: Fred Shabel
- Home arena: Cameron Indoor Stadium

1957–58 ACC men's basketball standings
	Conf.				Overall
Team	W		L	PCT	W		L	PCT
No. 10 Duke	11	–	3	.786	18	–	7	.720
No. 20 NC State	10	–	4	.714	18	–	6	.750
No. 13 North Carolina	10	–	4	.714	19	–	7	.731
No. 6 Maryland †	9	–	5	.643	22	–	7	.759
Virginia	6	–	8	.429	10	–	13	.435
Clemson	4	–	10	.286	8	–	16	.333
South Carolina	3	–	11	.214	5	–	19	.208
Wake Forest	3	–	11	.214	6	–	17	.261
† 1958 ACC tournament winner Rankings from AP Poll

The 1957–58 Duke Blue Devils men's basketball team represented Duke University in the 1957–58 NCAA Division I men's basketball season. The head coach was Harold Bradley and the team finished the season with an overall record of 18–7.
