= 1956–57 Washington State Cougars men's basketball team =

American college basketball season

1956–57 Washington State Cougars men's basketball
- Conference: Pacific Coast Conference
- Record: 8–18 (4–12 PCC)
- Head coach: Jack Friel (29th season)
- Home arena: Bohler Gymnasium

1956–57 Pacific Coast Conference men's basketball standings
	Conf.				Overall
Team	W		L	PCT	W		L	PCT
No. 13 California	14	–	2	.875	21	–	5	.808
No. 14 UCLA	13	–	3	.813	22	–	4	.846
Washington	13	–	3	.813	17	–	9	.654
USC	9	–	7	.563	16	–	12	.571
Stanford	7	–	9	.438	11	–	15	.423
Oregon State	6	–	10	.375	11	–	15	.423
Idaho	4	–	12	.250	10	–	16	.385
Washington State	4	–	12	.250	8	–	18	.308
Oregon	2	–	14	.125	4	–	21	.160
Rankings from AP Poll

The 1956–57 Washington State Cougars men's basketball team represented Washington State College for the 1956–57 NCAA college basketball season. Led by 29th-year head coach Jack Friel, the Cougars were members of the Pacific Coast Conference and played their home games on campus at Bohler Gymnasium in Pullman, Washington.

The Cougars were 8–18 overall in the regular season and 4–12 in conference play, tied for seventh in all of the standings.
