= 1957–58 UCLA Bruins men's basketball team =

American college basketball season

1957–58 UCLA Bruins men's basketball
- Conference: Pacific Coast Conference
- Record: 16–10 (10–6 PCC)
- Head coach: John R. Wooden (10th season)
- Assistant coaches: Bill Putnam; Jerry Norman
- Home arena: Pan-Pacific Auditorium

1957–58 Pacific Coast Conference men's basketball standings
	Conf.				Overall
Team	W		L	PCT	W		L	PCT
California †	12	–	4	.750	19	–	9	.679
Oregon State	12	–	4	.750	20	–	6	.769
UCLA	10	–	6	.625	16	–	10	.615
Idaho	9	–	7	.563	17	–	9	.654
USC	8	–	8	.500	12	–	13	.480
Stanford	7	–	9	.438	12	–	13	.480
Oregon	6	–	10	.375	13	–	11	.542
Washington	5	–	11	.313	8	–	18	.308
Washington State	3	–	13	.188	7	–	19	.269
† Conference playoff game winner Rankings from AP Poll

The 1957–58 UCLA Bruins men's basketball team represented the University of California, Los Angeles during the 1957–58 NCAA University Division men's basketball season and were members of the Pacific Coast Conference. The Bruins were led by tenth year head coach John Wooden. They finished the regular season with a record of 16–10 and finished third in the PCC with a record of 10–6.

== Previous season ==
The Bruins finished the regular season with a record of 22–4 and finished second in the PCC with a record of 13–3.

== Roster ==
1957–58 UCLA Bruins men's basketball team
Players
Coaches

Pos.	#	Name	Height	Weight	Year	Hometown
F	52	Bob Archer	6 ft 5 in (1.96 m)	—	Jr
	40	Bob Bell	—	—
G	23	Cliff Brandon	5 ft 10 in (1.78 m)	—	So
F	35	Conrad Burke	6 ft 5 in (1.96 m)	—	Sr
G		Denny Crum	6 ft 0 in (1.83 m)	—	Jr	San Fernando, California
G	43	Bill French	6 ft 1 in (1.85 m)	—
F	44	Jim Halsten	6 ft 4 in (1.93 m)	—	Sr
F	25	Rafer Johnson	6 ft 3 in (1.91 m)	201 lb (91 kg)	Jr
G	45	Denny Miller	6 ft 4 in (1.93 m)	—
C	32	Ben Rogers (C)	6 ft 6 in (1.98 m)	—	Sr
	24	Jim Steffen	—	—
G	22	Walt Torrence	6 ft 3 in (1.91 m)	—	Jr
F	55	Roland Underhill	6 ft 5 in (1.96 m)	—	Jr

Head coach

John Wooden (Purdue)

Assistant coach(es)

- Bill Putnam (UCLA)
- Jerry Norman (UCLA)

Legend

- (C) Team captain
- (S) Suspended
- (I) Ineligible
- (W) Walk-on
- Injured
- Current redshirt

Roster
Last update: 30 January 2018

== Schedule ==
Date time, TV	Rank^{#}	Opponent^{#}	Result	Record	Site city, state
Regular Season
December 6, 1957*		St. Mary's	W 70–64	1–0	Pan-Pacific Auditorium; Los Angeles, CA
December 7, 1957*		Oklahoma	W 60–53	2–0	Pan-Pacific Auditorium; Los Angeles, CA
December 13, 1957*	No. 13	DePauw	W 82–52	3–0	Pan-Pacific Auditorium; Los Angeles, CA
December 14, 1957*	No. 13	DePauw	W 73–48	4–0	Pan-Pacific Auditorium; Los Angeles, CA
December 18, 1957*	No. 13	at Wichita	L 68–83	4–1	University of Wichita Field House; Wichita, KS
December 20, 1957*	No. 13	at No. 11 Bradley	L 43–67	4–2	Robertson Memorial Field House; Peoria, Illinois
December 21, 1957*	No. 13	at Evansville	L 76–83	4–3	Roberts Municipal Stadium; Evansville, IN
December 27, 1957*		No. 8 Michigan State	L 61–63	4–4	Pan-Pacific Auditorium; Los Angeles, CA
December 28, 1957*		Ohio State	W 98–78	5–4	Pan-Pacific Auditorium; Los Angeles, CA
January 3, 1958		at Oregon	W 64–58	6–4 (1–0)	McArthur Court; Eugene, OR
January 4, 1958		at No. 18 Oregon State	L 61–68	6–5 (1–1)	Oregon State Coliseum; Corvallis, OR
January 10, 1958		Oregon	W 73–64	7–5 (2–1)	Pan-Pacific Auditorium; Los Angeles, CA
January 11, 1958		Idaho	W 64–56	8–5 (3–1)	Pan-Pacific Auditorium; Los Angeles, CA
January 17, 1958		USC	W 52–51	9–5 (4–1)	Pan-Pacific Auditorium; Los Angeles, CA
January 18, 1958		USC	W 80–75	10–5 (5–1)	Pan-Pacific Auditorium; Los Angeles, CA
January 31, 1958*		Santa Clara	W 77–56	11–5	Bakersfield College; Bakersfield, CA
February 7, 1958		Washington State	W 72–64	12–5 (6–1)	Pan-Pacific Auditorium; Los Angeles, CA
February 8, 1958		California	L 58–61	12–6 (6–2)	Pan-Pacific Auditorium; Los Angeles, CA
February 14, 1958		at Washington State	W 64–44	13–6 (7–2)	Beasley Coliseum; Pullman, WA
February 15, 1958		at Idaho	L 67–73	13–7 (7–3)	Memorial Gymnasium; Moscow, ID
February 17, 1958		at Washington	W 67–62	14–7 (8–3)	Hec Edmundson Pavilion; Seattle, WA
February 21, 1958		vs. Stanford	W 46–43	15–7 (9–3)	Long Beach City College; Long Beach, CA
February 22, 1958		vs. Oregon State	L 61–77	15–8 (9–4)	Long Beach City College; Long Beach, CA
February 28, 1958		at No. 19 California	L 50–56	16–9 (9–5)	Men's Gym; Berkeley, CA
March 1, 1958		at Stanford	L 50–57	16–10 (9–6)	Stanford Pavilion; Stanford, CA
March 8, 1958		Washington	W 89–68	16–10 (10–6)	Pan-Pacific Auditorium; Los Angeles, CA
*Non-conference game. ^{#}Rankings from AP Poll. (#) Tournament seedings in parentheses. All times are in Pacific Time.
