= 1956–57 Washington Huskies men's basketball team =

American college basketball season

1956–57 Washington Huskies men's basketball
- Conference: Pacific Coast Conference
- Record: 17–9 (13–3 PCC)
- Head coach: Tippy Dye (7th season)
- Home arena: Hec Edmundson Pavilion

1956–57 Pacific Coast Conference men's basketball standings
	Conf.				Overall
Team	W		L	PCT	W		L	PCT
No. 13 California	14	–	2	.875	21	–	5	.808
No. 14 UCLA	13	–	3	.813	22	–	4	.846
Washington	13	–	3	.813	17	–	9	.654
USC	9	–	7	.563	16	–	12	.571
Stanford	7	–	9	.438	11	–	15	.423
Oregon State	6	–	10	.375	11	–	15	.423
Idaho	4	–	12	.250	10	–	16	.385
Washington State	4	–	12	.250	8	–	18	.308
Oregon	2	–	14	.125	4	–	21	.160
Rankings from AP Poll

The 1956–57 Washington Huskies men's basketball team represented the University of Washington for the 1956–57 NCAA University Division basketball season. Led by seventh-year head coach Tippy Dye, the Huskies were members of the Pacific Coast Conference and played their home games on campus at Hec Edmundson Pavilion in Seattle, Washington.

The Huskies were 17–9 overall in the regular season and 13–3 in conference play, tied for second in the standings.
