= 1956–57 UCLA Bruins men's basketball team =

American college basketball season

1956–57 UCLA Bruins men's basketball
- Conference: Pacific Coast Conference

Ranking
- Coaches: No. 9
- AP: No. 14
- Record: 22–4 (13–3 PCC)
- Head coach: John R. Wooden (9th season)
- Assistant coaches: Bill Putnam; Deane Richardson
- Home arena: Pan-Pacific Auditorium

1956–57 Pacific Coast Conference men's basketball standings
	Conf.				Overall
Team	W		L	PCT	W		L	PCT
No. 13 California	14	–	2	.875	21	–	5	.808
No. 14 UCLA	13	–	3	.813	22	–	4	.846
Washington	13	–	3	.813	17	–	9	.654
USC	9	–	7	.563	16	–	12	.571
Stanford	7	–	9	.438	11	–	15	.423
Oregon State	6	–	10	.375	11	–	15	.423
Idaho	4	–	12	.250	10	–	16	.385
Washington State	4	–	12	.250	8	–	18	.308
Oregon	2	–	14	.125	4	–	21	.160
Rankings from AP Poll

The 1956–57 UCLA Bruins men's basketball team represented the University of California, Los Angeles during the 1956–57 NCAA University Division men's basketball season and were members of the Pacific Coast Conference. The Bruins were led by ninth year head coach John Wooden. They finished the regular season with a record of 22–4 and finished second in the PCC with a record of 13–3.

== Previous season ==
The Bruins finished the regular season with a record of 22–6 and won the PCC regular season championship with a record of 16–0. UCLA lost to the San Francisco Dons in the NCAA regional semifinals and defeated the Seattle Chieftains in the regional consolation game. The victory over Seattle was UCLA's first victory in the NCAA tournament.

== Roster ==
1956–57 UCLA Bruins men's basketball team
Players
Coaches

Pos.	#	Name	Height	Weight	Year	Hometown
F	52	Bob Archer	6 ft 5 in (1.96 m)	—	So
G	23	Gary Baker	5 ft 11 in (1.8 m)	—
G	42	Dick Banton (C)	6 ft 1 in (1.85 m)	—	Sr
F	53	Nate Brewer	6 ft 4 in (1.93 m)	—
F	35	Conrad Burke	6 ft 5 in (1.96 m)	—	Jr
G		Fred Crabtree	6 ft 0 in (1.83 m)	—
F	54	Bill Eblen	6 ft 4 in (1.93 m)	—
F	44	Jim Halsten	6 ft 4 in (1.93 m)	—	Jr
G	44	Jim Harrison	6 ft 1 in (1.85 m)	—	Jr
G		Art Hutchins	5 ft 11 in (1.8 m)	—
C	33	Nolan Johnson	6 ft 6 in (1.98 m)	—
F	25	Rafer Johnson	6 ft 3 in (1.91 m)	201 lb (91 kg)	So
C	32	Ben Rogers	6 ft 6 in (1.98 m)	—	Jr
C		Dick Skaer	6 ft 6 in (1.98 m)	—
G	22	Walt Torrence	6 ft 3 in (1.91 m)	—	So
F	55	Roland Underhill	6 ft 4 in (1.93 m)	—	So

Head coach

John Wooden (Purdue)

Assistant coach(es)

- Bill Putnam (UCLA)
- Deane Richardson

Legend

- (C) Team captain
- (S) Suspended
- (I) Ineligible
- (W) Walk-on
- Injured
- Current redshirt

Roster
Last update: 30 January 2018

== Schedule ==
Date time, TV	Rank^{#}	Opponent^{#}	Result	Record	Site city, state
Regular Season
November 30, 1956*		Nebraska	W 69–56	1–0	Pan-Pacific Auditorium; Los Angeles, CA
December 1, 1956*		Nebraska	W 78–60	2–0	Pan-Pacific Auditorium; Los Angeles, CA
December 8, 1956*		vs. Santa Clara	W 60–58	3–0	Bakersfield College Gymnasium; Bakersfield, CA
December 14, 1956*		BYU	W 74–69	4–0	Pan-Pacific Auditorium; Los Angeles, CA
December 15, 1956*		BYU	L 58–59	4–1	Pan-Pacific Auditorium; Los Angeles, CA
December 21, 1956*		Missouri	W 77–57	5–1	Pan-Pacific Auditorium; Los Angeles, CA
December 22, 1956*		Occidental	W 93–40	6–1	Pan-Pacific Auditorium; Los Angeles, CA
December 26, 1956*		at No. 5 St. Louis	W 72–66	7–1	Kiel Auditorium; St. Louis, MO
December 28, 1956*		at Butler	W 82–71	8–1	Hinkle Fieldhouse; Indianapolis, IN
December 29, 1956*		at Indiana	W 52–48	9–1	The Fieldhouse; Bloomington, IN
January 4, 1957	No. 8	at Idaho	W 64–63	10–1 (1–0)	Memorial Gymnasium; Moscow, ID
January 5, 1957	No. 8	at Idaho	W 69–68	11–1 (2–0)	Memorial Gymnasium; Moscow, ID
January 11, 1957	No. 8	Washington State	W 87–65	12–1 (3–0)	Pan-Pacific Auditorium; Los Angeles, CA
January 12, 1957	No. 8	Washington State	W 83–62	13–1 (4–0)	Pan-Pacific Auditorium; Los Angeles, CA
February 1, 1957	No. 5	vs. Oregon State	W 59–37	14–1 (5–0)	Long Beach City College; Long Beach, CA
February 2, 1957	No. 5	vs. Oregon State	W 64–53	15–1 (6–0)	Long Beach City College; Long Beach, CA
February 8, 1957	No. 5	at Washington	W 68–65	16–1 (7–0)	Hec Edmundson Pavilion; Seattle, WA
February 9, 1957	No. 5	at Washington	L 74–90	17–2 (7–1)	Hec Edmundson Pavilion; Seattle, WA
February 15, 1957	No. 7	Stanford	W 86–63	18–2 (8–1)	Pan-Pacific Auditorium; Los Angeles, CA
February 16, 1957	No. 7	Stanford	W 79–61	19–2 (9–1)	Pan-Pacific Auditorium; Los Angeles, CA
February 22, 1957	No. 8	at Oregon	W 81–62	20–2 (10–1)	McArthur Court; Eugene, OR
February 23, 1957	No. 8	at Oregon	W 73–65	21–2 (11–1)	McArthur Court; Eugene, OR
February 26, 1957	No. 6	USC	L 80–84	21–3 (11–2)	Pan-Pacific Auditorium; Los Angeles, CA
March 1, 1957	No. 6	at California	W 71–66	22–3 (12–2)	Men's Gym; Berkeley, CA
March 2, 1957	No. 6	at California	L 68–73	22–4 (12–3)	Men's Gym; Berkeley, CA
March 5, 1957	No. 7	USC	W 65–55	22–4 (13–3)	Pan-Pacific Auditorium; Los Angeles, CA
*Non-conference game. ^{#}Rankings from AP Poll. (#) Tournament seedings in parentheses. All times are in Pacific Time.
