= 1956–57 Idaho Vandals men's basketball team =

American college basketball season

1956–57 Idaho Vandals men's basketball
- Conference: Pacific Coast Conference
- Record: 10–16 (4–12 PCC)
- Head coach: Harlan Hodges (3rd season)
- Assistant coach: Clem Parberry
- MVP: Gary Simmons
- Home arena: Memorial Gymnasium

1956–57 Pacific Coast Conference men's basketball standings
	Conf.				Overall
Team	W		L	PCT	W		L	PCT
No. 13 California	14	–	2	.875	21	–	5	.808
No. 14 UCLA	13	–	3	.813	22	–	4	.846
Washington	13	–	3	.813	17	–	9	.654
USC	9	–	7	.563	16	–	12	.571
Stanford	7	–	9	.438	11	–	15	.423
Oregon State	6	–	10	.375	11	–	15	.423
Idaho	4	–	12	.250	10	–	16	.385
Washington State	4	–	12	.250	8	–	18	.308
Oregon	2	–	14	.125	4	–	21	.160
Rankings from AP Poll

The 1956–57 Idaho Vandals men's basketball team represented the University of Idaho during the 1956–57 NCAA University Division basketball season. Members of the Pacific Coast Conference, the Vandals were led by third-year head coach Harlan Hodges and played their home games on campus at Memorial Gymnasium in Moscow, Idaho.

The Vandals were 10–16 overall and 4–12 in conference play.

Idaho played two home games in southern Idaho on consecutive nights in late December, a split against Colorado A&M in Idaho Falls and Twin Falls.

An injured ankle in late December kept guard Gary Simmons sidelined for more than a month.
