= 1957–58 Kansas Jayhawks men's basketball team =

American college basketball season

1957–58 Kansas Jayhawks men's basketball
- Conference: Big Eight Conference

Ranking
- Coaches: No. 8
- AP: No. 7
- Record: 18–5 (8–4 Big 8)
- Head coach: Dick Harp (2nd season)
- Assistant coaches: Jack Eskridge (4th season); Jerry Waugh (2nd season)
- Home arena: Allen Fieldhouse

1957–58 Big Eight Conference men's basketball standings
	Conf.				Overall
Team	W		L	PCT	W		L	PCT
No. 3 Kansas State	10	–	2	.833	22	–	5	.815
No. 7 Kansas	8	–	4	.667	18	–	5	.783
Iowa State	8	–	4	.667	15	–	8	.652
Oklahoma	5	–	7	.417	13	–	10	.565
Nebraska	5	–	7	.417	10	–	13	.435
Missouri	3	–	9	.250	9	–	13	.409
Colorado	3	–	9	.250	8	–	15	.348
Rankings from AP Poll

The 1957–58 Kansas Jayhawks men's basketball team represented the University of Kansas during the 1957–58 college men's basketball season.

== Roster ==
- Wilt Chamberlain
- Ron Loneski
- Bob Billings
- Bob Hickman
- Al Donaghue
- Monte Johnson
- Jim Hoffman
- Gary Thompson
- Lyn Kindred
- John Cleland
- Jerry Johnson
- Gary Mowry
- Larry Kelley
- Art Muegler

== Schedule ==
Date time, TV	Rank^{#}	Opponent^{#}	Result	Record	Site city, state
December 2*		at Oklahoma State	W 63–56	1-0	Gallagher-Iba Arena; Stillwater, OK
December 4*		Canisius	W 66–46	2-0	Allen Fieldhouse; Lawrence, KS
December 7*		at Northwestern	W 71–65	3-0	Welsh-Ryan Arena; Evanston, IL
December 9*		at Marquette	W 82–62	4-0	Milwaukee Arena; Milwaukee, WI
December 14*	No. 2	at Saint Joseph's	W 66–54	5-0	Hagan Arena; Philadelphia, PA
December 20*	No. 2	Washington	W 77–59	6-0	Allen Fieldhouse; Lawrence, KS
December 21*	No. 2	vs. California	W 58–52	7-0	Ahearn Field House; Manhattan, KS
December 26	No. 2	vs. Oklahoma	W 68–50	8-0	Municipal Auditorium; Kansas City, MO
December 28	No. 2	vs. No. 20 Iowa State	W 55–48	9-0	Municipal Auditorium; Kansas City, MO
December 30	No. 2	vs. No. 3 Kansas State; Sunflower Showdown	W 79–65	10-0	Municipal Auditorium; Kansas City, MO
January 5*	No. 2	No. 14 Oklahoma State	L 50–52	10-1	Allen Fieldhouse; Lawrence, KS
January 7	No. 2	at Oklahoma	L 62–64	10-2 (0-1)	Field House; Norman, OK
January 13	No. 2	Colorado	W 67–46	11-2 (1-1)	Allen Fieldhouse; Lawrence, KS
January 18	No. 3	at Missouri; Border War	W 68–54	12-2 (2-1)	Brewer Fieldhouse; Columbia, MO
February 3	No. 2	No. 4 Kansas State; Sunflower Showdown	L 75–79	12-3 (2-2)	Allen Fieldhouse; Lawrence, KS
February 8	No. 2	Nebraska	W 102–46	13-3 (3-2)	Allen Fieldhouse; Lawrence, KS
February 10	No. 2	at Colorado	W 60–51	14-3 (4-2)	Allen Fieldhouse; Lawrence, KS
February 15	No. 4	Iowa State	W 90–61	15-3 (5-2)	Allen Fieldhouse; Lawrence, KS
February 17	No. 4	Missouri; Border War	W 84–69	16-3 (6-2)	Allen Fieldhouse; Lawrence, KS
February 22	No. 4	at Nebraska	L 41–43	16-4 (6-3)	Nebraska Coliseum; Lincoln, NE
February 24; 7:35 pm, WOI/WIBW	No. 4	at Iowa State	L 42–48	16-5 (6-4)	The Armory; Ames, IA
February 28	No. 7	Oklahoma	W 60–59 ^{OT}	17-5 (7-4)	Allen Fieldhouse; Lawrence, KS
February 27	No. 7	at No. 1 Kansas State; Sunflower Showdown	W 61–44	18-5 (8-4)	Ahearn Field House; Manhattan, KS
*Non-conference game. ^{#}Rankings from AP Poll. (#) Tournament seedings in parentheses.
