= Walt Torrence =

American basketball player

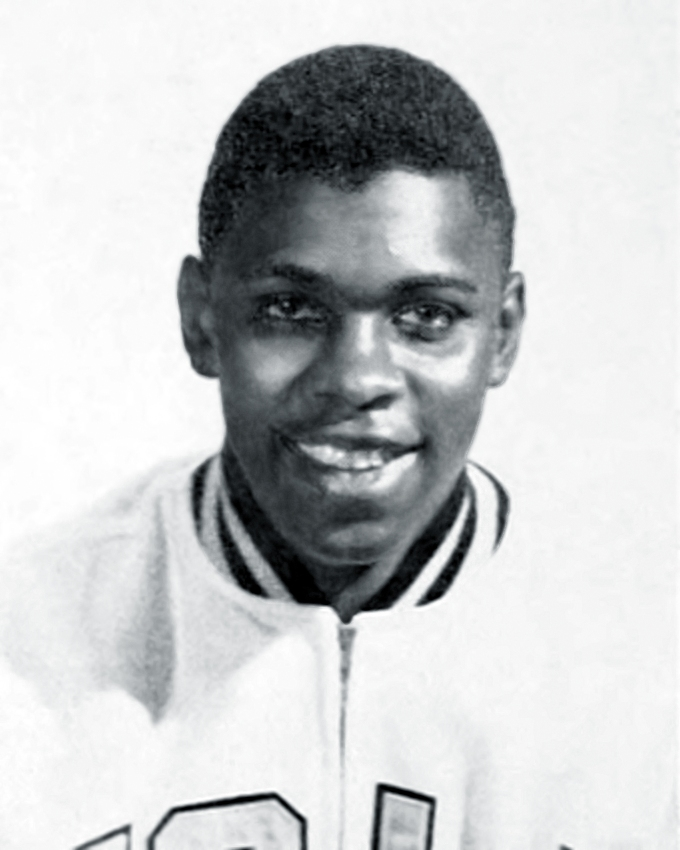
- Torrence with UCLA, c. 1959

Personal information
- Born: July 31, 1937
- Died: September 20, 1969 (aged 32) Carmichael, California, U.S.
- Listed height: 6 ft 3 in (1.91 m)
- Listed weight: 180 lb (82 kg)

Career information
- High school: Grant Union (Sacramento, California)
- College: UCLA (1956–1959)
- NBA draft: 1959: 8th round, 58th overall pick
- Drafted by: New York Knicks
- Position: Guard
- Number: 22

Career highlights
- Third-team All-American – UPI (1959); First-team All-PCC (1959); Second-team All-PCC (1958)
- Stats at Basketball Reference
Medals
Men's basketball
Representing United States
Pan American Games
Gold medal – first place	1963 São Paulo	Team competition

Walter Alexander Torrence (July 31, 1937 – September 20, 1969) was an American basketball player. He played college basketball for the UCLA Bruins. He earned all-conference honors in the Pacific Coast Conference (PCC) as a junior, and was named an All-American as a senior in 1959. After college, Torrence joined the United States Army. He was one of five Army members on the US national basketball team which won the gold medal at the Pan American Games in 1963.

== Early life ==
Growing up in Sacramento, California, at age nine, Torrence played basketball at Lincoln Christian Center after school. When the other boys went home for dinner, he would stay and practice, and still be there when they came back after eating. He would get back home around 8:00 p.m., get in trouble and sometimes be spanked, but continue to stay out late anyway. Torrence later played basketball at Grant Union High, leading them to an undefeated season in 1954–55. He also competed in track, finishing tied for second in the high jump at the 1955 state meet and establishing a personal best of 6 feet 6 inches (1.98 m).

== College career ==
Torrence attempts to protect the paint against a cutting Jimmy Anderson (No. 34) of Oregon State, 1959.

Torrence attended the University of California, Los Angeles (UCLA), and played guard for the Bruins basketball team for three seasons (1956–1959). Despite not being exceptionally tall or strong at 6 feet 3 inches (1.91 m) and 180 pounds (82 kg), he led the team in rebounding for three straight seasons. As a sophomore in 1956–57, he was named the Bruins' top first-year varsity player. He received honorable mention from conference coaches for the All-PCC team, and was named third-team All-Coast by United Press International (UPI).

In 1957–58, Torrence averaged 12.4 points per game to finish second on the Bruins behind senior center Ben Rogers, who scored one more point (324–323). Torrence earned second-team All-PCC honors, and was also named second-team All-Pacific Coast by UPI.

Entering the 1958–59 season, Torrence was the only returning full-time starter for UCLA. By then, he had also become a notable high jumper on the Bruins' track team. UCLA basketball coach John Wooden called him the best player on the team, which also included future Olympic gold medalist Rafer Johnson and future two-time national championship coach Denny Crum. Torrence became the fourth player in UCLA history to score over 1,000 points in his career. He led the PCC in scoring with 344 points, averaging 21.4 points per game, and was the only unanimous selection for the first-team All-PCC. Torrence finished the season with overall averages of 21.5 points and 11.6 rebounds per game, which were both ranked second in school history at the time behind Willie Naulls. Torrence was voted a third-team All-American by UPI, and he was also a first-team selection by the Converse Basketball Yearbook and the Helms Athletic Foundation. (Note: UPI was used to complile the consensus All-American team that year. Converse (1932–1948) and Helms (1929–1948) had also been used in the past.) The University of California system named him their athlete of the year for 1959.

Torrence finished his UCLA career with averages of 15.3 points and 8.5 rebounds, leaving the school ranked second in scoring average, and third in both total points and career rebounds. He was inducted into the UCLA Athletics Hall of Fame in 2009. Through the 2017–18 season, his final season averages of 21.5 points and 11.6 rebounds still ranked fifth all-time among UCLA seniors. Wooden included Torrence among former players he would choose for his all-time 2-2-1 zone press unit. (Note: Wooden also named Keith Erickson, Gail Goodrich, Keith Wilkes (known later as Jamaal Wilkes), and Sidney Wicks.)

== US Army ==
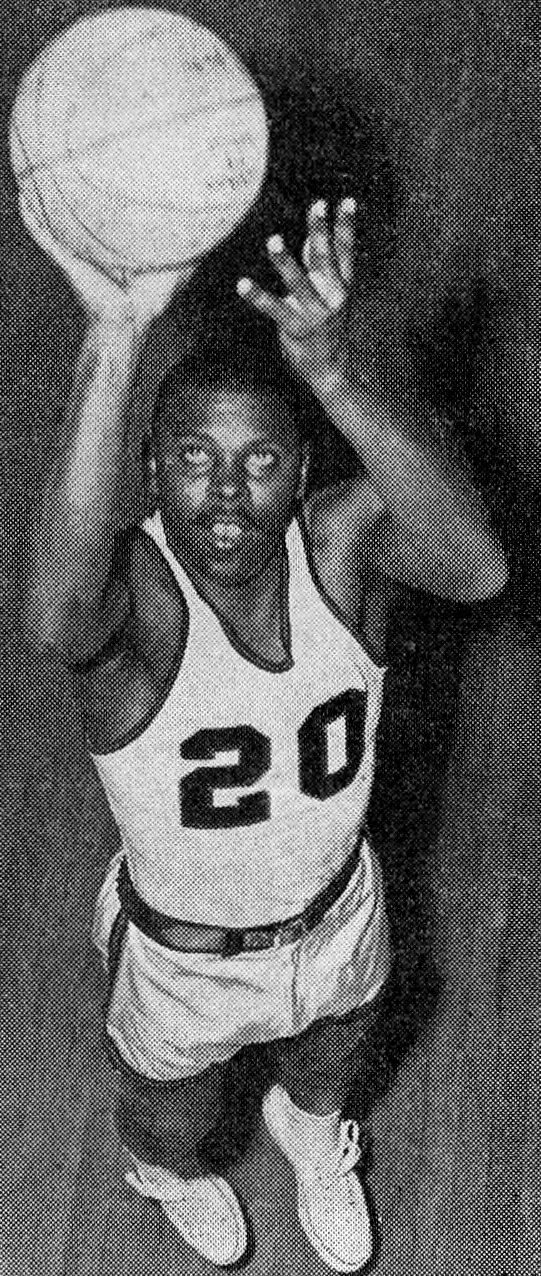
Torrence, circa 1962

Selected by the New York Knicks in the eighth round of the 1959 NBA draft, Torrence instead joined the US Army. He was commissioned a second lieutenant in 1960, and was stationed at Angel Island in California in his first year. He was a captain by 1965, when he took command of Headquarters Battery, 5th Missile Battalion at Olathe Naval Air Station in Kansas.

Torrence competed in the 1962 Military Olympics in Germany. In 1963, he was the captain of the Armed Forces team that won the United States trials for the Pan American Games. It was the first time that the military services won the trials. Torrence was one of five Armed Forces members, all from the Army, who were selected for the 12-man US national team at the 1963 PanAm Games in Brazil. The US won the gold medal, but Torrence played in just three games after returning home due to the death of his father. He was also a member of the US squad which finished fourth at the 1963 World Championship.

== Death ==
On September 20, 1969, Torrence died at age 32 in Mercy San Juan Hospital in Carmichael, California, from injuries suffered in a car accident near Sacramento. He was a passenger in a car on Interstate 80 about 1/4 mi (400 m) west of Alta that went off the center divide, hit a concrete drain box, and glanced off an oncoming car. His wife Ada and four children—Sandra, Alex, Gregory, and Raymond—received a court-approved settlement of $25,000 from the driver and owners of the vehicle.
