= 1957–58 Iowa State Cyclones men's basketball team =

American college basketball season

1957–58 Iowa State Cyclones men's basketball
- Conference: Big Eight Conference
- Record: 15–8 (8–4 Big Eight)
- Head coach: Bill Strannigan (4th season)
- Home arena: Iowa State Armory

1957–58 Big Eight Conference men's basketball standings
	Conf.				Overall
Team	W		L	PCT	W		L	PCT
No. 3 Kansas State	10	–	2	.833	22	–	5	.815
No. 7 Kansas	8	–	4	.667	18	–	5	.783
Iowa State	8	–	4	.667	15	–	8	.652
Oklahoma	5	–	7	.417	13	–	10	.565
Nebraska	5	–	7	.417	10	–	13	.435
Missouri	3	–	9	.250	9	–	13	.409
Colorado	3	–	9	.250	8	–	15	.348
Rankings from AP Poll

The 1957–58 Iowa State Cyclones men's basketball team represented Iowa State University during the 1957–58 NCAA men's basketball season. The Cyclones were coached by Bill Strannigan, who was in his fourth season with the Cyclones. They played their home games at the Iowa State Armory in Ames, Iowa.

They finished the season 15–8, 8–4 in Big Eight play to finish in a tie for second.

== Roster ==
1957–58 Iowa State Cyclones men's basketball team
Players
Coaches

Pos.	#	Name	Height	Weight	Year	Hometown
G		Ronald Baukol	5 ft 10 in (1.78 m)	—	Jr
F		Bud Bergman	6 ft 4 in (1.93 m)	—	Jr
F		John Crawford (C)	6 ft 5 in (1.96 m)	—	Sr
F		Gary Davis	6 ft 6 in (1.98 m)	—	Jr
G		Dick Farwell	6 ft 1 in (1.85 m)	—	Sr
G		Larry Fie	—	—	So	Spencer, Iowa
G		Lyle Frahm (C)	6 ft 2 in (1.88 m)	—	Sr
F		Gene Gronau	6 ft 4 in (1.93 m)	—	Jr
F		Dale Johnson	6 ft 2 in (1.88 m)	—
C		John Krocheski	6 ft 7 in (2.01 m)	—	Jr
G		Al Lowery	5 ft 10 in (1.78 m)	—	Sr
C		Don Medsker (C)	6 ft 8 in (2.03 m)	—	Sr
F		Doug Meyer	6 ft 3 in (1.91 m)	—

Head coach

- Bill Strannigan

Assistant coach(es)

Legend

- (C) Team captain
- (S) Suspended
- (I) Ineligible
- (W) Walk-on
- Injured
- Current redshirt

== Schedule and results ==
Date time, TV	Rank^{#}	Opponent^{#}	Result	Record	Site city, state
Regular season
December 2, 1957*; 7:35 pm		Drake; Iowa Big Four	W 62–55	1–0	Iowa State Armory; Ames, Iowa
December 5, 1957*; 8:00 pm		at Minnesota	L 66–67	1–1	Williams Arena; Minneapolis
December 12, 1957*; 9:00 pm		at BYU	W 54–45	2–1	Smith Fieldhouse; Provo, Utah
December 14, 1957*		at Wyoming	W 72–51	3–1	War Memorial Fieldhouse; Laramie, Wyoming
December 21, 1957*; 7:35 pm		Illinois	W 68–60	4–1	Iowa State Armory; Ames, Iowa
December 23, 1957*; 8:30 pm		No. 9 Michigan State	L 51–57 ^{OT}	4–2	Iowa State Armory; Ames, Iowa
December 26, 1957*; 9:30 pm	No. 20	vs. Colorado; Big Eight Holiday Tournament Quarterfinals	W 81–43	5–2	Municipal Auditorium; Kansas City, Missouri
December 28, 1957*; 7:30 pm	No. 20	vs. No. 2 Kansas; Big Eight Holiday Tournament Semifinals	L 48–55	5–3	Municipal Auditorium; Kansas City, Missouri
December 29, 1957*; 7:30 pm	No. 20	vs. Nebraska; Big Eight Holiday Tournament Third Place	W 61–51	6–3	Municipal Auditorium; Kansas City, Missouri
January 6, 1958*; 7:35PM		Montana State	L 61–62	6–4	Iowa State Armory; Ames, Iowa
January 11, 1958; 7:35 pm		Missouri	W 62–55	7–4 (1–0)	Iowa State Armory; Ames, Iowa
January 13, 1958*; 8:15 pm		at Drake; Iowa Big Four	W 63–42	8–4	Veterans Memorial Auditorium; Des Moines, Iowa
January 18, 1958; 7:30 pm		at Nebraska	W 57–52	9–4 (2–0)	Nebraska Coliseum; Lincoln, Nebraska
January 20, 1958; 9:00 pm		at Colorado	L 36–45	9–5 (2–1)	Balch Fieldhouse; Boulder, Colorado
January 25, 1958; 7:35 pm, WOI/WIBW		No. 3 Kansas State	L 54–64	9–6 (2–2)	Iowa State Armory; Ames, Iowa
February 1, 1958; 7:35 pm		Nebraska	W 78–63	10–6 (3–2)	Iowa State Armory; Ames, Iowa
February 8, 1958; 7:35 pm		at No. 4 Kansas State	L 70–77	10–7 (3–3)	Ahearn Fieldhouse; Manhattan, Kansas
February 15, 1958; 7:35 pm		at No. 4 Kansas	L 61–90	10–8 (3–4)	Allen Fieldhouse; Lawrence, Kansas
February 17, 1958; 7:35 pm		at No. 20 Oklahoma	W 59–56 ^{OT}	11–8 (4–4)	OU Fieldhouse; Norman, Oklahoma
February 24, 1958; 7:35 pm, WOI/WIBW		No. 4 Kansas	W 48–42	12–8 (5–4)	Iowa State Armory; Ames, Iowa
March 1, 1958; 7:35 pm		Colorado	W 71–44	13–8 (6–4)	Iowa State Armory; Ames, Iowa
March 3, 1958; 7:35 pm		Oklahoma	W 66–65	14–8 (7–4)	Iowa State Armory; Ames, Iowa
March 10, 1958; 8:00 pm		at Missouri	W 63–59 ^{OT}	15–8 (8–4)	Brewer Fieldhouse; Columbia, Missouri
*Non-conference game. ^{#}Rankings from AP poll. (#) Tournament seedings in parentheses. All times are in Central Time.
