= 1958 ACC men's basketball tournament =

- Classification: Division I
- Season: 1957–58
- Teams: 8
- Site: Reynolds Coliseum; Raleigh, North Carolina
- Champions: Maryland (1st title)
- Winning coach: Bud Millikan (1st title)
- MVP: Nick Davis (Maryland)

1957–58 ACC men's basketball standings
	Conf.				Overall
Team	W		L	PCT	W		L	PCT
No. 10 Duke	11	–	3	.786	18	–	7	.720
No. 20 NC State	10	–	4	.714	18	–	6	.750
No. 13 North Carolina	10	–	4	.714	19	–	7	.731
No. 6 Maryland †	9	–	5	.643	22	–	7	.759
Virginia	6	–	8	.429	10	–	13	.435
Clemson	4	–	10	.286	8	–	16	.333
South Carolina	3	–	11	.214	5	–	19	.208
Wake Forest	3	–	11	.214	6	–	17	.261
† 1958 ACC tournament winner Rankings from AP Poll

The 1958 Atlantic Coast Conference men's basketball tournament was held in Raleigh, North Carolina, at Reynolds Coliseum from March 6–8, 1958. Maryland defeated North Carolina, 86–74, to win their first ACC championship, making Maryland the first school outside North Carolina to win the title. Nick Davis of Maryland was named tournament MVP.

== Bracket ==
Quarterfinals; March 6
1	#6 Duke	51
8	Wake Forest	44
4	#17 Maryland	70
5	Virginia	66
2	#14 NC State	66
7	South Carolina	61
3	#13 North Carolina	63
6	Clemson	51

Semifinals; March 7
1	#6 Duke	65
4	#17 Maryland	71^{OT}
2	#14 NC State	58
3	#13 North Carolina	64

Championship Game; March 8
4	#17 Maryland	86
3	#13 North Carolina	74
