= 1957–58 Auburn Tigers men's basketball team =

American college basketball season

1957–58 Auburn Tigers men's basketball
- Conference: Southeastern Conference

Ranking
- AP: No. 16
- Record: 16–6 (11–3 SEC)
- Head coach: Joel Eaves (9th season)
- Captain: Rex Frederick
- Home arena: Auburn Sports Arena

1957–58 Southeastern Conference men's basketball standings
	Conf.				Overall
Team	W		L	PCT	W		L	PCT
No. 9 Kentucky	12	–	2	.857	23	–	6	.793
No. 16 Auburn	11	–	3	.786	16	–	6	.727
No. 15 Mississippi State	9	–	5	.643	20	–	5	.800
Alabama	9	–	5	.643	17	–	9	.654
Tennessee	8	–	6	.571	16	–	7	.696
Georgia Tech	8	–	6	.571	15	–	11	.577
Vanderbilt	7	–	7	.500	14	–	11	.560
Ole Miss	6	–	8	.429	12	–	12	.500
Florida	5	–	9	.357	12	–	9	.571
Tulane	3	–	11	.214	8	–	15	.348
LSU	3	–	11	.214	7	–	18	.280
Georgia	3	–	11	.214	7	–	19	.269
Rankings from AP Poll

The 1957–58 Auburn Tigers men's basketball team represented Auburn University in the 1957–58 college basketball season. The team's head coach was Joel Eaves, who was in his ninth season at Auburn. The team played their home games at Auburn Sports Arena in Auburn, Alabama. They finished the season 16–6, 11–3 in SEC play.
