= 1957–58 NCAA University Division men's basketball rankings =

- Season: 1957–58
- NCAA Tournament: 1958
- NCAA Tournament Champions: Kentucky
NCAA University Division men's basketball rankings


The 1957–58 NCAA men's basketball rankings was made up of two human polls, the AP Poll and the Coaches Poll.

== Legend ==
	Increase in ranking
	Decrease in ranking
	New to rankings from previous week
Italics	Number of first place votes
(#–#)	Win–loss record
т	Tied with team above or below also with this symbol

== AP Poll ==
	Week 1 Dec. 9	Week 2 Dec. 16	Week 3 Dec. 23	Week 4 Dec. 30	Week 5 Jan. 6	Week 6 Jan. 13	Week 7 Jan. 20	Week 8 Jan. 27	Week 9 Feb. 3	Week 10 Feb. 10	Week 11 Feb. 17	Week 12 Feb. 24	Week 13 Mar. 3	Final Mar. 10	
1.	North Carolina (1–0)	North Carolina (4–0)	West Virginia (8–0)	West Virginia (8–0)	West Virginia (10–0)	West Virginia (12–0)	West Virginia (13–0)	West Virginia (14–0)	West Virginia (15–1)	Kansas State (16–1)	Kansas State (17–1)	Kansas State (18–1)	Kansas State (20–1)	West Virginia (26–1)	1.
2.	Kansas (3–0)	Kansas (5–0)	Kansas (7–0)	Kansas (9–0)	Kansas (10–1)	Kansas State (11–1)	Kansas (12–2)	Kansas (12–2)	Kansas (12–2)	West Virginia (17–1)	Cincinnati (18–2)	West Virginia (22–1)	West Virginia (23–1)	Cincinnati (24–2)	2.
3.	Kentucky (3–0)	Kansas State (4–0)	Kansas State (7–0)	Kansas State (9–0)	North Carolina (9–1)	Kansas (10–2)	Kansas State (12–1)	Cincinnati (13–2)	Cincinnati (15–2)	Cincinnati (16–2)	West Virginia (20–1)	Cincinnati (20–2)	Cincinnati (22–2)	Kansas State (20–3)	3.
4.	Bradley (1–0)	Cincinnati (4–0)	North Carolina (5–1)	North Carolina (8–1)	Kansas State (9–1)	San Francisco (12–1)	Cincinnati (12–2)	Kansas State (13–1)	Kansas State (14–1)	Kansas (13–3)	Kansas (15–3)	San Francisco (21–1)	San Francisco (23–1)	San Francisco (24–1)	4.
5.	Kansas State (2–0)	Kentucky (4–1)	Cincinnati (6–0)	Cincinnati (7–1)	Mississippi State (10–0)	Cincinnati (10–2)	San Francisco (12–1)	San Francisco (13–1)	San Francisco (15–1)	San Francisco (16–1)	San Francisco (19–1)	Temple (20–2)	Temple (22–2)	Temple (24–2)	5.
6.	San Francisco (2–0)	Maryland (4–0)	Maryland (6–0)	San Francisco (8–1)	San Francisco (10–1)	North Carolina (11–2)	Maryland (10–2)	Oklahoma State (12–1)	Oklahoma State (13–2)	Oklahoma State (15–2)	Temple (18–2)	Duke (16–5)	Duke (17–6)	Maryland (20–6)	6.
7.	Michigan State (2–0)	San Francisco (3–0)	San Francisco (6–1)	Maryland (6–0)	Cincinnati (8–1)	Oklahoma State (10–1)	Oklahoma State (11–1)	North Carolina (12–3)	North Carolina (13–3)	Temple (16–2)	Duke (14–5)	Kansas (16–4)	Notre Dame (21–4)	Kansas (18–5)	7.
8.	West Virginia (3–0)	West Virginia (5–0)	Michigan State (4–0)	Michigan State (7–0)	Oklahoma State (8–1)	Maryland (9–2)	North Carolina (12–3)	Kentucky (12–3)	Maryland (11–3)	Duke (12–5)	Oklahoma State (16–3)	Notre Dame (17–4)	Dayton (22–2)	Notre Dame (22–4)	8.
9.	Saint Louis (1–0)	Michigan State (3–0)	Kentucky (5–3)	Mississippi State (9–0)	Kentucky (8–3)	Kentucky (10–3)	Kentucky (12–3)	Maryland (10–3)	NC State (12–3)	Maryland (13–3)	NC State (15–4)	North Carolina (17–5)	Kentucky (19–6)	Kentucky (19–6)	9.
10.	Temple (1–1)	Minnesota (3–0)	Mississippi State (7–0)	Kentucky (6–3)	Bradley (6–1)	Bradley (8–1)	Bradley (10–2)	NC State (11–3)	Temple (14–2)	NC State (14–3)	Notre Dame (15–4)	Dayton (20–2)	Kansas (17–5)	Duke (18–7)	10.
11.	Minnesota (3–0)	Bradley (2–1)	Bradley (3–1)	NC State (8–2)	Maryland (7–2)	Mississippi State (11–1)	Temple (12–2)	Temple (13–2)	Bradley (12–3)	North Carolina (13–4)	Dayton (20–2)	NC State (16–5)	Bradley (18–5)	Dayton (23–3)	11.
12.	NC State (2–0)	Seattle (3–0)	Utah (6–0)	Bradley (5–1)	Temple (8–2)	Temple (10–2)	NC State (11–3)	Bradley (11–3)	Kentucky (14–4)	Kentucky (15–4)	Michigan State (14–4)	Kentucky (18–5)	Michigan State (16–5)	Indiana (12–10)	12.
13.	UCLA (2–0)	UCLA (4–0)	NC State (6–1)	Temple (6–2)	NC State (9–2)	Tennessee (8–2)	St. John's (8–0)	St. John's (9–0)	Duke (9–5)	Bradley (13–4)	Kentucky (16–5)	Oklahoma State (18–5)	North Carolina (17–6)	North Carolina (19–7)	13.
14.	Seattle (0–0)	Rice (3–0)	Oklahoma State (6–1)	Oklahoma State (6–1)	Michigan State (7–2)	Oklahoma (9–2)	Mississippi State (11–3)	Mississippi State (12–3)	Dayton (16–2)	Dayton (18–2)	Maryland (14–4)	Bradley (17–5)	NC State (17–5)	Bradley (20–5)	14.
15.	Notre Dame (2–0)	Utah (4–0)	Seattle (3–2)	Utah (8–1)	Oregon State (10–1)	St. John's (8–0)	Michigan State (9–2)	Michigan State (10–3)	Michigan State (11–3)	Tennessee (15–3)	Bradley (14–4)	Michigan State (15–4)	Mississippi State (20–5)	Mississippi State (20–5)	15.
16.	Rice (2–0)	Oklahoma State (3–1)	Western Kentucky (4–1)	TCU (9–1)	St. John's (7–0)	Oregon State (10–1)	Tennessee (8–4)	Dayton (14–2)	Seattle (10–4)	Seattle (12–4)	North Carolina (15–5)	Mississippi State (18–5)	Auburn (16–6)	Auburn (16–6)	16.
17.	Syracuse (1–0)	Oregon State (5–0)	Richmond (5–2)	St. John's (6–0)	Illinois (7–1)	Wichita (10–1)	Dayton (13–2)	Arkansas (11–3)	Mississippi State (14–3)	Notre Dame (13–4)	Seattle (15–5)	Maryland (15–6)	Maryland (17–6)	Michigan State (16–6)	17.
18.	Oklahoma State (1–1)	Mississippi State (6–0)	Saint Louis (2–1)	Oregon State (8–1)	Memphis State (4–3)	Michigan State (8–2)	Dartmouth (13–1)	Wichita (11–4)	Arkansas (12–4)	Mississippi State (15–4)	Mississippi State (16–5)	Seattle (16–5)	Oklahoma State (18–6)	Seattle (19–5)	18.
19.	Cincinnati (2–0)	Richmond (5–0)	St. John's (6–0)	California (3–4)	Utah (9–2)	Dartmouth (11–1)	Wichita (11–2)	Dartmouth (13–1)	Georgia Tech (12–7)	Michigan State (11–4)	Dartmouth (17–2)	California (15–6)	Seattle (17–5)	Oklahoma State (19–7)	19.
20.	Memphis State (2–0)	NC State (5–1)	Iowa State (4–2)	La Salle (6–2)	Seattle (4–4) т Wichita (9–1) т	NC State (9–3)	Arkansas (10–3)	Oregon State (12–3)	Dartmouth (14–1)	Oklahoma (11–4)	Tennessee (11–7)	Auburn (14–6)	St. Bonaventure (19–3)	NC State (18–6)	20.
	Week 1 Dec. 9	Week 2 Dec. 16	Week 3 Dec. 23	Week 4 Dec. 30	Week 5 Jan. 6	Week 6 Jan. 13	Week 7 Jan. 20	Week 8 Jan. 27	Week 9 Feb. 3	Week 10 Feb. 10	Week 11 Feb. 17	Week 12 Feb. 24	Week 13 Mar. 3	Final Mar. 10	
		Dropped: Saint Louis; Temple (2–2); Notre Dame (3–1); Syracuse; Memphis State	Dropped: Minnesota; UCLA; Rice; Oregon State (5–1)	Dropped: Seattle (4–3); Western Kentucky; Richmond; Saint Louis; Iowa State (6–3)	Dropped: TCU (10–1); California (5–2); La Salle	Dropped: Illinois (7–3); Memphis State; Utah (10–2); Seattle (6–4)	Dropped: Oklahoma; Oregon State (10–2)	Dropped: Tennessee	Dropped: St. John's; Wichita; Oregon State	Dropped: Arkansas; Georgia Tech; Dartmouth	Dropped: Oklahoma	Dropped: Dartmouth; Tennessee	Dropped: California (17–7)	Dropped: St. Bonaventure (19–4)	

== UP Poll ==
	Week 1 Dec. 10	Week 2 Dec. 17	Week 3 Dec. 24	Week 4 Dec. 31	Week 5 Jan. 7	Week 6 Jan. 14	Week 7 Jan. 21	Week 8 Jan. 28	Week 9 Feb. 4	Week 10 Feb. 11	Week 11 Feb. 18	Week 12 Feb. 25	Week 13 Mar. 4	Final Mar. 11	
1.	North Carolina (1–0)	North Carolina (4–0)	Kansas (7–0)	Kansas (9–0)	West Virginia (10–0)	West Virginia (12–0)	West Virginia (13–0)	West Virginia (14–0)	Kansas (12–2)	Kansas State (16–1)	Kansas State (17–1)	Kansas State (18–1)	Kansas State (20–1)	West Virginia (26–1)	1.
2.	Kansas (3–0)	Kansas (5–0)	Kansas State (7–0)	Kansas State (9–0)	Kansas (10–1)	San Francisco (12–1)	Kansas (12–2)	Kansas (12–2)	West Virginia (15–1)	West Virginia (17–1)	West Virginia (20–1)	West Virginia (22–1)	Cincinnati (22–2)	Cincinnati (24–2)	2.
3.	Kentucky (3–0)	Kansas State (4–0)	West Virginia (8–0)	North Carolina (8–1)	North Carolina (9–1)	Kansas (10–2)	San Francisco (12–1)	San Francisco (13–1)	San Francisco (15–1)	San Francisco (16–1)	Cincinnati (18–2)	Cincinnati (20–2)	West Virginia (23–1)	San Francisco (24–1)	3.
4.	Bradley (1–0)	San Francisco (3–0)	North Carolina (5–1)	West Virginia (8–0)	San Francisco (10–1)	Kansas State (11–1)	Kansas State (12–1)	Cincinnati (13–2)	Kansas State (14–1)	Cincinnati (16–2)	San Francisco (19–1)	San Francisco (21–1)	San Francisco (23–1)	Kansas State (20–3)	4.
5.	San Francisco (2–0)	Michigan State (3–0)	San Francisco (6–1)	San Francisco (8–1)	Kansas State (9–1)	North Carolina (11–2)	Cincinnati (12–2)	Kansas State (13–1)	Cincinnati (15–2)	Kansas (13–3)	Kansas (15–3)	Temple (20–2)	Temple (22–2)	Temple (24–2)	5.
6.	Kansas State (2–0)	Kentucky (4–1)	Michigan State (4–0)	Michigan State (7–0)	Cincinnati (8–1)	Cincinnati (10–2)	Oklahoma State (11–1)	Oklahoma State (12–1)	North Carolina (13–3)	Oklahoma State (15–2)	Temple (18–2)	Duke (16–5)	Duke (17–6)	Maryland (20–6)	6.
7.	Michigan State (2–0)	Cincinnati (4–0)	Cincinnati (6–0)	Maryland (6–0)	Bradley (6–1) т	Maryland (9–2)	Maryland (10–2)	North Carolina (12–3) т	Oklahoma State (13–2)	Temple (16–2)	Oklahoma State (16–3)	Kansas (16–4)	Michigan State (16–5)	Notre Dame (22–4)	7.
8.	Temple (1–1)	Seattle (3–0)	Bradley (3–1)	Cincinnati (7–1)	Temple (8–2) т	Bradley (8–1)	North Carolina (12–3)	Temple (13–2) т	Temple (14–2)	Maryland (13–3)	NC State (15–4)	Michigan State (15–4)	Notre Dame (21–4)	Kansas (18–5)	8.
9.	UCLA (2–0)	Maryland (4–0)	Maryland (6–0)	Bradley (5–1)	Oklahoma State (8–1)	Oklahoma State (10–1)	Temple (12–2)	Bradley (11–3)	Bradley (12–3)	NC State (14–3)	Duke (14–5)	NC State (16–5)	Kansas (17–5)	Dayton (23–3)	9.
10.	Notre Dame (2–0)	UCLA (4–0)	Utah (6–0)	Temple (6–2)	Oregon State (10–1)	Temple (10–2)	Bradley (10–2)	Kentucky (12–3)	Maryland (11–3)	North Carolina (13–4) т	Michigan State (14–4)	Notre Dame (17–4)	Dayton (22–2)	Indiana (12–10)	10.
11.	Rice (2–0)	Bradley (2–1)	Kentucky (5–3)	Oregon State (8–1)	Mississippi State (10–0)	Oregon State (10–1)	Michigan State (9–2)	Maryland (10–3)	Michigan State (11–3)	Kentucky (15–4) т	Maryland (14–4)	North Carolina (17–5)	Bradley (18–5)	Bradley (20–5)	11.
12.	Saint Louis (1–0)	Rice (3–0)	Temple (4–2)	Utah (8–1)	Maryland (7–2) т	Michigan State (8–2)	Kentucky (12–3)	NC State (11–3)	Kentucky (14–4)	Dayton (18–2)	Dayton (20–2)	Oklahoma State (18–5)	Oklahoma State (18–6)	North Carolina (19–7)	12.
13.	Seattle (0–0)	Temple (2–2)	Seattle (3–2)	TCU (9–1)	Michigan State (7–2) т	Kentucky (10–3)	Oregon State (10–2)	Michigan State (10–3)	Dayton (16–2)	Duke (12–5)	Notre Dame (15–4)	Dayton (20–2)	NC State (17–5)	Duke (18–7)	13.
14.	Utah (2–0)	West Virginia (5–0)	Iowa State (4–2)	Oklahoma State (6–1)	TCU (10–1) т	Utah (10–2)	NC State (11–3)	Oregon State (12–3)	NC State (12–3)	Bradley (13–4)	North Carolina (15–5)	Bradley (17–5)	Kentucky (19–6)	Kentucky (19–6)	14.
15.	Minnesota (3–0)	Utah (4–0)	Saint Louis (2–1)	Kentucky (6–3)	Kentucky (8–3)	Mississippi State (11–1)	Mississippi State (11–3)	Dayton (14–2)	Seattle (10–4)	Notre Dame (13–4)	Bradley (14–4)	Kentucky (18–5) т	North Carolina (17–6)	Oklahoma State (19–7)	15.
16.	West Virginia (3–0)	Minnesota (3–0)	Oklahoma State (6–1)	Seattle (4–3)	Utah (9–2)	Tennessee (8–2) т	Dayton (13–2)	Arkansas (11–3)	Arkansas (12–4) т	Michigan State (11–4)	Kentucky (16–5)	Maryland (15–6) т	Indiana (11–10)	NC State (18–6) т	16.
17.	Cincinnati (2–0)	Oregon State (5–0)	Oregon State (5–1)	California (3–4)	Minnesota (5–2)	Notre Dame (9–2) т	St. John's (8–0)	St. John's (9–0)	Oregon State (13–4) т	Michigan (9–5)	Seattle (15–5)	California (15–6)	Maryland (17–6)	Oregon State (20–5) т	17.
18.	Ohio State (0–2)	Iowa State (3–1)	Illinois (5–1)	Notre Dame (6–2)	NC State (9–2) т	Dayton (11–2)	Tennessee (8–4) т	California (9–5)	Duke (9–5) т	California (11–6)	BYU (11–9)	Seattle (16–5)	St. Bonaventure (19–3)	St. Bonaventure (19–4)	18.
19.	Illinois (2–0)	Duke (2–1) т	St. John's (6–0)	UCLA (5–4)	California (5–2) т	Illinois (7–3) т	Notre Dame (10–3) т	BYU (6–9) т	Notre Dame (13–4) т	Tennessee (15–3)	St. Bonaventure (15–3)	St. Bonaventure (17–3)	California (17–7)	Michigan State (16–6) т	19.
20.	Washington (1–1)	Michigan (3–1) т Notre Dame (3–1) т	Louisville (5–3) т Wichita (6–1) т Yale (3–1) т	Iowa State (6–3)	Iowa State (5–2) т	Minnesota (5–3) т Seattle (6–4) т	Xavier (10–2) т	Notre Dame (12–3) т Seattle (9–4) т	BYU (8–9)	Seattle (12–4) т BYU (10–9) т	California (12–6) т Purdue (11–7) т Saint Louis (12–7) т	Purdue (12–7)	Oregon State (18–4)	Seattle (19–5) т Wyoming (13–13) т	20.
	Week 1 Dec. 10	Week 2 Dec. 17	Week 3 Dec. 24	Week 4 Dec. 31	Week 5 Jan. 7	Week 6 Jan. 14	Week 7 Jan. 21	Week 8 Jan. 28	Week 9 Feb. 4	Week 10 Feb. 11	Week 11 Feb. 18	Week 12 Feb. 25	Week 13 Mar. 4	Final Mar. 11	
		Dropped: Saint Louis; Ohio State; Illinois; Washington	Dropped: UCLA; Rice; Minnesota; Duke; Michigan; Notre Dame	Dropped: Saint Louis; Illinois; St. John's; Louisville; Wichita; Yale	Dropped: Seattle; Notre Dame; UCLA	Dropped: TCU; NC State; California; Iowa State	Dropped: Utah; Illinois; Minnesota; Seattle	Dropped: Mississippi State; Tennessee; Xavier	Dropped: St. John's; California	Dropped: Arkansas; Oregon State	Dropped: Michigan; Tennessee	Dropped: BYU; Saint Louis	Dropped: Seattle (17–5); Purdue	Dropped: California (17–7)	
