= Nebraska Coliseum =

Indoor arena in Lincoln, Nebraska

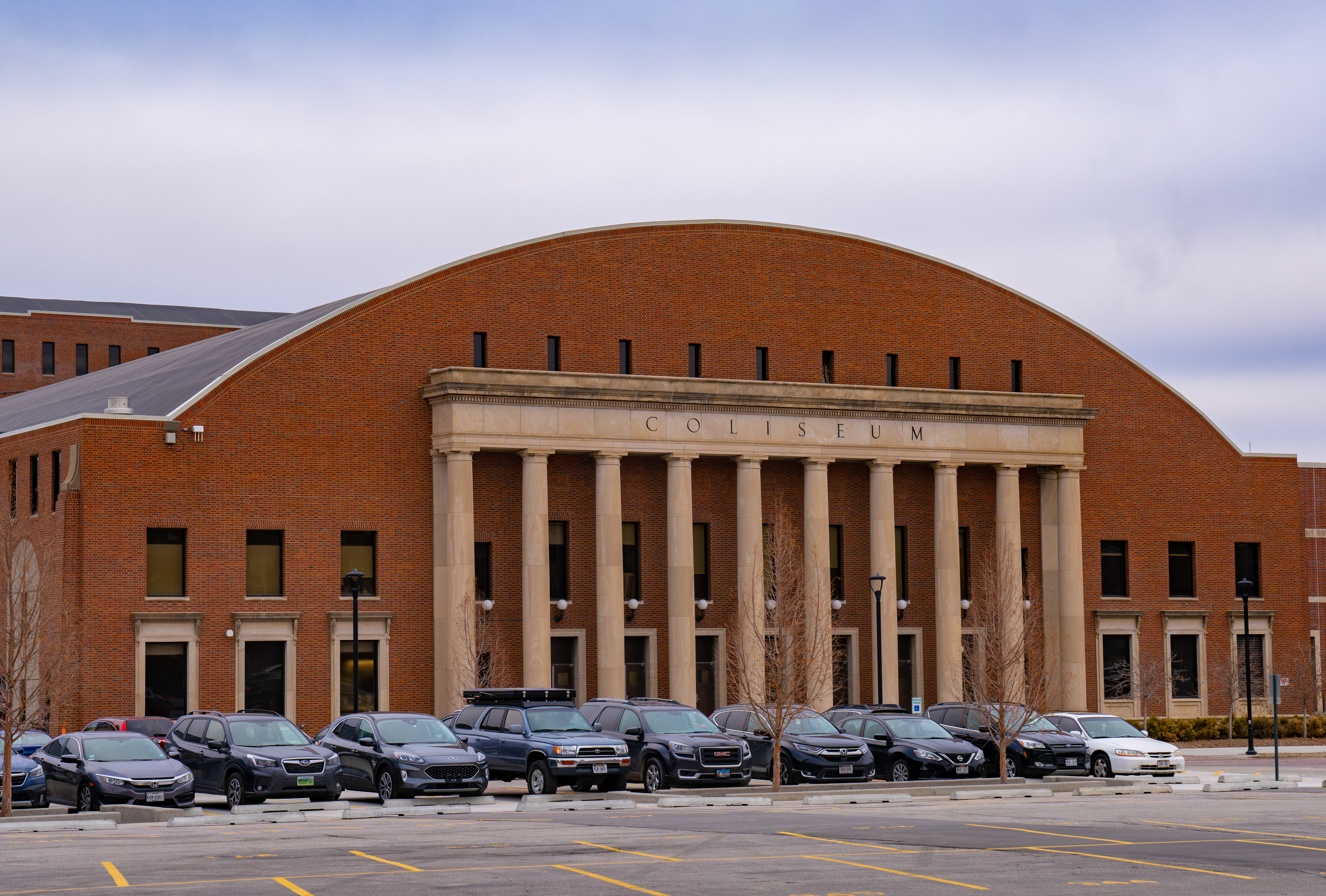
- The Coliseum in 2023
- Interactive map of Nebraska Coliseum
- Address: 1350 Vine Street; Lincoln, Nebraska
- Coordinates: 40°49′17″N 96°42′9″W
- Owner: University of Nebraska–Lincoln
- Operator: University of Nebraska–Lincoln
- Capacity: 8,000 (1926–1991); 4,030 (1991–2013)

Construction
- Groundbreaking: 1924
- Opened: February 6, 1926; 100 years ago
- Renovated: 1989–1992
- Closed: 2013
- Cost: $435,000 ($8.22 million in 2025)
- Architects: Ellery L. Davis; Walter Wilson

Tenants
- Nebraska Cornhuskers (NCAA); Men's basketball (1926–1976); Women's basketball (1975–1976); Volleyball (1975–1990, 1992–2013); Wrestling (1942–1990, 1992–2013)

The Nebraska Coliseum (NU Coliseum) is an arena on the campus of the University of Nebraska–Lincoln in Lincoln, Nebraska. It most notably served as the home venue of the school's men's basketball and volleyball teams. Since volleyball was moved to the larger Bob Devaney Sports Center in 2013, the Coliseum has been primarily used for student recreation.

== History ==
=== Planning and construction ===
Shortly after the end of World War I, the University of Nebraska began planning a million-dollar stadium complex that included a gymnasium and museum. The state, which initially set aside $250,000, was forced to back out of its commitment during an agricultural depression through the early 1920s, and the project was scaled back to just a football stadium.

Planning for a standalone arena, to be located just northeast of Memorial Stadium, began the year after the stadium's completion at the suggestion of Athletic Board member John K. Selleck. It was designed by architects Ellery L. Davis and Walter Wilson, both university alumni who had worked on several campus buildings, including Memorial Stadium.

The Nebraska Coliseum, funded using gate receipt revenue from 1923 football games, broke ground in 1924 and opened in early 1926 to serve as the home venue of Nebraska's indoor sports programs. The new arena featured a Roman-style façade at its main entrance, with ten columns overlooking Bessey Hall. It was constructed using Indiana limestene with a red brick exterior, matching most surrounding buildings.

=== Renovation ===
In 1987, the university announced a renovation of the Coliseum alongside plans for an adjacent recreation center. Renovations included expanding and repairing the swimming pool, which was condemned in 1986, adding additional offices, and installing an overhead jogging track in the main arena. Construction began in 1989 and was completed in 1992.

=== Closure ===
Since volleyball vacated the arena in 2013, it is no longer the primary home venue for any varsity athletic programs, though it was used as a practice facility and office space by Nebraska's gymnastics teams until the purpose-built Francis Allen Training Center opened in April 2020. It was incorporated into the university's Campus Recreation Center and is attached to Cook Pavilion.

== Basketball ==
Nebraska hosted its first event at the unfinished arena on February 6, 1926, a basketball game against Kansas. A crowd of 5,000, the largest for a basketball game in school history at the time, packed into temporary bleachers to see a 25–14 Jayhawks victory. When construction was completed months later, the Coliseum could hold 8,000 spectators.

Nebraska's basketball program was generally unsuccessful in its fifty years at the Coliseum, though a nine-day stretch in 1958 produced two of the most memorable games in school history, wins over Wilt Chamberlain-led Kansas and top-ranked Kansas State. Nebraska moved to the NU Sports Complex (later dedicated as the Bob Devaney Sports Center) when it was completed in 1976.

Nebraska's women's team played its first varsity season in 1975–76 at the Coliseum before also moving to the NU Sports Complex, and later to West Haymarket Arena. For several decades, the Coliseum hosted the Nebraska School Activities Association Boys and Girls State Basketball Championship.

== Volleyball ==
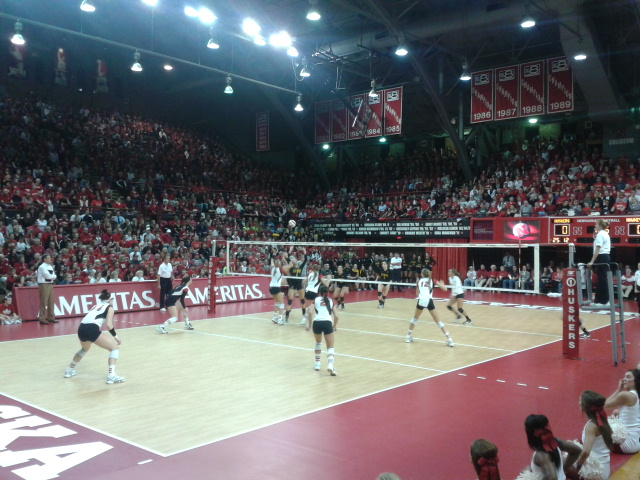
Nebraska vs. Iowa at the NU Coliseum on Nov. 21, 2012

After the completion of the NU Sports Complex in 1976, the Coliseum primarily served as the home venue of Nebraska's volleyball team. It underwent an extensive renovation in 1991 to better suit the needs of the program, reducing capacity to 4,030. The renovation made the Coliseum one of few collegiate arenas designed specifically for volleyball, and it became known for its intimate atmosphere which generated deafening acoustics. For decades the Coliseum provided a significant home-court advantage – Nebraska compiled an all-time record of 511–36 at the venue, including a 52–4 mark in the NCAA Division I tournament.

Nebraska set an NCAA Division I record with ninety consecutive home victories from 2004 to 2009. The streak ended against UCLA on September 14, 2009, in front of an NCAA regular-season-record crowd at the Devaney Center; NU's win streak at the Coliseum ended two weeks later. In 2001, Nebraska began a sellout streak that continued from the Coliseum to the Devaney Center; the streak eventually passed 300 and ranks second to NU's football sellout streak across all collegiate sports.

== Other events ==
In its early days, the Coliseum hosted university-sponsored swing dances. It hosted an Elvis Presley concert in 1956, an address by Vice President Richard Nixon in 1960, and a speech by United States Senator Robert F. Kennedy during his 1968 presidential campaign, just two months before his assassination.
