= 1957–58 Washington Huskies men's basketball team =

American college basketball season

1957–58 Washington Huskies men's basketball
- Conference: Pacific Coast Conference
- Record: 8–18 (5–11 PCC)
- Head coach: Tippy Dye (8th season)
- Assistant coach: Joe Cipriano
- Home arena: Hec Edmundson Pavilion

1957–58 Pacific Coast Conference men's basketball standings
	Conf.				Overall
Team	W		L	PCT	W		L	PCT
California †	12	–	4	.750	19	–	9	.679
Oregon State	12	–	4	.750	20	–	6	.769
UCLA	10	–	6	.625	16	–	10	.615
Idaho	9	–	7	.563	17	–	9	.654
USC	8	–	8	.500	12	–	13	.480
Stanford	7	–	9	.438	12	–	13	.480
Oregon	6	–	10	.375	13	–	11	.542
Washington	5	–	11	.313	8	–	18	.308
Washington State	3	–	13	.188	7	–	19	.269
† Conference playoff game winner Rankings from AP Poll

The 1957–58 Washington Huskies men's basketball team represented the University of Washington for the 1957–58 NCAA University Division basketball season. Led by eighth-year head coach Tippy Dye, the Huskies were members of the Pacific Coast Conference and played their home games on campus at Hec Edmundson Pavilion in Seattle, Washington.

The Huskies were 8–18 overall in the regular season and 5–11 in conference play, eighth in the standings.
