= 1957–58 Arkansas Razorbacks men's basketball team =

American college basketball season

1957–58 Arkansas Razorbacks men's basketball

Southwest Conference Champions

NCAA Tournament, Sweet Sixteen
- Conference: Southwest Conference
- Record: 17–10 (9–5 SWC)
- Head coach: Glen Rose (6th consecutive season; 15th overall season)
- Home arena: Razorback Fieldhouse

1957–58 Southwest Conference men's basketball standings
	Conf.				Overall
Team	W		L	PCT	W		L	PCT
Arkansas	9	–	5	.643	17	–	10	.630
SMU	9	–	5	.643	15	–	10	.600
TCU	8	–	6	.571	17	–	7	.708
Texas Tech	8	–	6	.571	15	–	8	.652
Rice	7	–	7	.500	13	–	11	.542
Texas A&M	7	–	7	.500	11	–	13	.458
Texas	5	–	9	.357	10	–	13	.435
Baylor	3	–	11	.214	5	–	19	.208
Rankings from AP Poll

The 1957–58 Arkansas Razorbacks men's basketball team represented the University of Arkansas in the 1957–58 college basketball season. The Razorbacks played their home games in Barnhill Arena (then known as Razorback Fieldhouse) in Fayetteville, Arkansas. Arkansas competed in the Southwest Conference. It was former Razorback All-American Glen Rose's sixth season in his second stint as head coach of the Hogs and fifteenth season overall as Arkansas's coach. The Razorbacks tied for the Southwest Conference championship with a record of 9–5 against SWC teams and 17–10 overall. Arkansas earned the SWC's bid to the NCAA Tournament, but lost both its second-round game and regional consolation match. The Oklahoma State team that beat Arkansas in the Sweet Sixteen featured future Razorback head coach Eddie Sutton at point guard.

1958 was Arkansas's fourteenth SWC Championship and its fifth NCAA Tournament appearance. Glen Rose won his fifth SWC championship as coach of the Razorbacks and the only conference championship of his second tenure as head coach. Arkansas was ranked in the AP Poll for the second time in program history on January 20, 1958. The Hogs were ranked for consecutive weeks for the first time ever when they were ranked for three straight weeks before losing to Rice and falling out of the polls. Senior Fred Grim was named First Team All-SWC, First Team All-District, and AP All-American Honorable Mention. Grim was drafted in the fifth round of the 1958 NBA draft by the Syracuse Nationals.

== Roster ==
Roster retrieved from HogStats.com.

1957–58 Arkansas Razorbacks men's basketball team
Players
Coaches

Pos.	#	Name	Height	Weight	Year	Previous school	Hometown
G	12	Fred Grim	6 ft 0 in (1.83 m)	175 lb (79 kg)	Sr	Green Forest High School	Green Forest, Arkansas
G	24	Larry Grisham	6 ft 3 in (1.91 m)	185 lb (84 kg)	Sr	Jonesboro High School; Oklahoma State	Jonesboro, Arkansas
F	34	Harry Thompson	6 ft 5 in (1.96 m)	195 lb (88 kg)	Jr	Mount Pleasant High School	Mount Pleasant, Arkansas
G	11	Tommy Rankin	6 ft 2 in (1.88 m)	180 lb (82 kg)	So	Jonesboro High School	Jonesboro, Arkansas
C	25	Jay Carpenter	6 ft 6 in (1.98 m)	210 lb (95 kg)	Jr	N/A	Jefferson City, Missouri
F	21	Wayne Dunn	6 ft 5 in (1.96 m)	205 lb (93 kg)	Sr	Hampton High School	Hampton, Arkansas
F	22	Lawrence Stolzer	6 ft 4 in (1.93 m)	205 lb (93 kg)	Jr	Little Rock Central High School; Little Rock Junior College	Little Rock, Arkansas
G	10	Dick Rittman	6 ft 3 in (1.91 m)	210 lb (95 kg)	Sr	Subiaco Academy; Mississippi	Stuttgart, Arkansas
G	30	Ora Lee Boss	6 ft 0 in (1.83 m)	180 lb (82 kg)	So	Green Forest High School	Green Forest, Arkansas
F	32	Zane Hankins	6 ft 4 in (1.93 m)	185 lb (84 kg)	So	Newport High School	Newport, Arkansas
C	21	Willis Edmiston	6 ft 6 in (1.98 m)	185 lb (84 kg)	So	Lincoln High School	Lincoln, Arkansas

Head coach

Glen Rose (Arkansas)

Assistant coach(es)

Legend

- (C) Team captain
- (S) Suspended
- (I) Ineligible
- (W) Walk-on
- Injured
- Current redshirt

Roster
Last update: July 15, 2021

== Schedule and results ==
Schedule retrieved from HogStats.com.

Date time, TV	Rank^{#}	Opponent^{#}	Result	Record	Site city, state
Regular Season
December 2, 1957*		at Oklahoma	L 52–64	0–1	McCasland Field House; Norman, Oklahoma
December 4, 1957*		New Mexico A&M	W 59–50	1–1	Razorback Fieldhouse; Fayetteville, Arkansas
December 7, 1957*		at Tulsa	W 79–61	2–1	Tulsa Fairgrounds Pavilion; Tulsa, Oklahoma
December 13, 1957*		Mississippi	W 61–58	3–1	Robinson Auditorium; Little Rock, Arkansas
December 16, 1957*		No. 5 Kansas State	L 48–63	3–2	Razorback Fieldhouse; Fayetteville, Arkansas
December 20, 1957*		Missouri	W 55–45	4–2	Razorback Fieldhouse; Fayetteville, Arkansas
December 26, 1957*		vs. Texas; SWC Tournament	W 83–67	5–2	Houston, Texas
December 27, 1957*		vs. Rice; SWC Tournament	L 49–50	5–3	Houston, Texas
December 28, 1957*		vs. Texas Tech; SWC Tournament	W 71–67	6–3	Houston, Texas
January 4, 1958		at Texas	W 57–55	7–3 (1–0)	Gregory Gymnasium; Austin, Texas
January 6, 1958		at Baylor	W 68–53	8–3 (2–0)	Heart O' Texas Fair Coliseum; Waco, Texas
January 10, 1958		TCU	W 65–49	9–3 (3–0)	Razorback Fieldhouse; Fayetteville, Arkansas
January 13, 1958		Texas Tech	W 58–55	10–3 (4–0)	Razorback Fieldhouse; Fayetteville, Arkansas
January 23, 1958*	No. 20	Tulsa	W 50–43	11–3 (4–0)	Razorback Fieldhouse; Fayetteville, Arkansas
January 28, 1958	No. 17	Texas A&M	W 67–51	12–3 (5–0)	Razorback Fieldhouse; Fayetteville, Arkansas
February 1, 1958	No. 17	at SMU	L 46–49	12–4 (5–1)	Moody Coliseum; Dallas, Texas
February 3, 1958	No. 17	at TCU	W 56–46	13–4 (6–1)	Fort Worth High School; Fort Worth, Texas
February 8, 1958	No. 18	Rice	L 59–63	13–5 (6–2)	Razorback Fieldhouse; Fayetteville, Arkansas
February 11, 1958		SMU	W 65–63	14–5 (7–2)	Razorback Fieldhouse; Fayetteville, Arkansas
February 15, 1958		at Texas Tech	L 48–69	14–6 (7–3)	Lubbock Municipal Coliseum; Lubbock, Texas
February 22, 1958		at Texas A&M	L 57–66	14–7 (7–4)	G. Rollie White Coliseum; College Station, Texas
February 24, 1958		at Rice	L 59–61	14–8 (7–5)	Tudor Fieldhouse; Houston, Texas
March 1, 1958		Baylor	W 79–55	15–8 (8–5)	Razorback Fieldhouse; Fayetteville, Arkansas
March 4, 1958		Texas	W 74–60	16–8 (9–5)	Razorback Fieldhouse; Fayetteville, Arkansas
March 11, 1958*		vs. SMU; District VI Playoff	W 61–55	17–8 (9–5)	Shreveport, Louisiana
NCAA Tournament
March 14, 1958*		vs. No. 18 Oklahoma State; Sweet Sixteen	L 40–65	17–9 (9–5)	Allen Fieldhouse; Lawrence, Kansas
March 15, 1958*		vs. No. 3 Cincinnati; Regional Consolation Game	L 62–97	17–10 (9–5)	Allen Fieldhouse; Lawrence, Kansas
*Non-conference game. ^{#}Rankings from AP Poll. (#) Tournament seedings in parentheses. All times are in Central Time.
