= 1957–58 Atlantic Coast Conference men's basketball season =

== Final standings ==
Team	ACC Regular Season	Regular season %	All Games	All Games %	Nonconference Games	Ranked AP All	Ranked AP Nonconference
Duke	11–3	.786	18–7	.720			
North Carolina	10–4	.714	19–7	.731			
NC State	10–4	.714	18–6	.750			
Maryland	9–5	.643	22–7	.759			
Virginia	6–8	.429	10–13	.435			
Clemson	4–10	.286	8–16	.333			
South Carolina	3–11	.214	5–19	.208			
Wake Forest	3–11	.214	6–17	.261			
Total			106–92	.535			

== ACC tournament ==
Maryland won the 1958 ACC men's basketball tournament after defeating North Carolina, 86–74, in the championship game.

== NCAA tournament ==
=== Round of 24 ===
Maryland 86, Boston College 63

=== Regional semi-finals ===
Temple 71, Maryland 67

=== Regional third-place ===
Maryland 59, Manhattan 55

=== ACC's NCAA record ===
2–1

== NIT ==
League rules prevented ACC teams from playing in the NIT, 1954–1966
