= Don Mills (basketball) =

American basketball player

Personal information
- Listed height: 6 ft 6 in (1.98 m)
- Listed weight: 185 lb (84 kg)

Career information
- High school: Berea (Berea, Kentucky)
- College: Kentucky (1957–1960)
- NBA draft: 1960: 18th round, 92nd overall pick
- Drafted by: Syracuse Nationals
- Position: Center
- Number: 54

Career highlights
- NCAA champion (1958)
- Stats at Basketball Reference

Don Mills is a former American college basketball player. He is best known as a key reserve on the University of Kentucky's 1958 NCAA championship team.

== College career ==
Mills was recruited to play basketball at the University of Kentucky by head coach Adolph Rupp following an All-American season at Berea Community High School. As a sophomore (the first season he was eligible to play), Mills was the first player off the bench for the "Fiddlin' Five" during the 1957-58 season. He played a significant role in the 1958 Championship Game against Seattle after starting center Ed Beck was sidelined due to foul trouble. Mills scored nine points off the bench, including a hook shot over Seattle's Elgin Baylor with 5:50 minutes left in the second half to give Kentucky the lead.

Mills became the Wildcats' starting center the following season. As a senior, he averaged 12.8 points and 12.9 rebounds per game and was named second team All-Southeastern Conference (SEC) by the Associated Press and first team All-SEC by the conference's coaches. He finished his collegiate career with 699 rebounds (9.4 per game) and 664 points (9.4 per game) in 71 total games played.

== Post-Kentucky ==
Mills was selected in the 18th round (92nd overall) by the Syracuse Nationals in the 1960 NBA draft but never played in an NBA game.
