= Seattle Redhawks =

Intercollegiate sports teams of Seattle University

- University: Seattle University
- Nickname: Redhawks
- NCAA: Division I
- Conference: WCC (primary); Mountain Pacific Sports Federation (swimming & diving)
- Athletic director: Shaney Fink
- Location: Seattle, Washington
- Varsity teams: 20
- Basketball arena: Redhawk Center and Climate Pledge Arena
- Baseball stadium: Bannerwood Park
- Softball stadium: Logan Field at SU Park
- Soccer field: Championship Field
- Colors: Red and white
- Mascot: Rudy the Redhawk
- Fight song: Ol' Seattle U
- Website: goseattleu.com
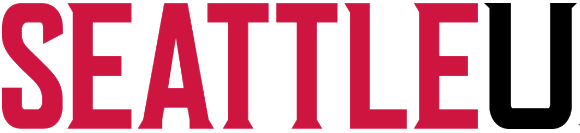

The Seattle Redhawks — known as the Seattle Chieftains prior to January 2000 — are the intercollegiate varsity athletic teams of Seattle University of Seattle, Washington. Informally and colloquially, they are referred to as Seattle U. They compete in NCAA Division I as a member institution of the West Coast Conference (WCC). The university became a full member of the West Coast Conference on July 1, 2025.

== History ==
Between 1950 and 1971, Seattle competed as an NCAA Division I independent, then joined the West Coast Athletic Conference (now West Coast Conference) in 1971. The Chieftains gained national attention in early 1952 when the basketball team defeated the Harlem Globetrotters. Seattle was led by the O'Brien twins, Eddie and Johnny, of South Amboy, New Jersey; Johnny became the first college player to score 1,000 points in a season and both were named All-Americans. The 5 ft 9 in (1.75 m) twins led Seattle to the NIT in Madison Square Garden in 1952, and then onto its first NCAA Tournament berth in 1953. The O'Briens were selected in the 1953 NBA draft by the Milwaukee Hawks but were also standouts in baseball. Upon graduation, Eddie and Johnny opted for the diamond and played together in the major leagues with the Pittsburgh Pirates from 1953 to 1958. Eddie (1930–2014) was later the baseball coach and athletic director at SU.

Seattle has eight wins (plus two consolation game victories) in eleven NCAA basketball tournament appearances (all from 1953 to 1969); half of the wins came in 1958 when the Chieftains advanced to the championship game at Freedom Hall in Louisville, Kentucky, against the University of Kentucky. Seattle was led by consensus All-American and future NBA Hall of Famer Elgin Baylor of Washington, D.C., who was named most outstanding player of the tournament. In the semifinal on Friday night against tournament favorite Kansas State, he scored 23 points and grabbed 22 rebounds as Seattle won by 22 points in an upset rout, 73–51. In the final the next night, John Castellani's Chieftains led by three points at the half, but Baylor soon picked up his fourth personal foul, which limited his effectiveness in the second half and Adolph Rupp's Wildcats won by a dozen, 84–72.

During a period in the 1960s, Seattle led the nation with the number of active players in the NBA. Notable basketball alums include Eddie Miles, Tom Workman, Rod Derline, and Clint Richardson, who won an NBA title with the Philadelphia 76ers in 1983. Tennis player Tom Gorman led SU before leading the USA Davis Cup teams in the 1970s. Janet Hopps (tennis) and Pat Lesser (golf) were trailblazers in the advancement of women's sports in the 1950s competing nationally as a part of the men's teams. Seattle native Ruth Jessen attended for a year and was a top LPGA tour player in the 1960s.

In 1953, Patricia Lesser won the women's individual intercollegiate golf championship (an event conducted by the Division of Girls' and Women's Sports (DGWS) — which later evolved into the current NCAA women's golf championship).

In March 1980, due to a recession that crippled the region, the administration contemplated dropping intercollegiate athletics. Two months later, SU voluntarily downgraded its athletic program from NCAA Division I to the small-college NAIA, the Chieftains competed at this level for the next 21 years.

Under the leadership of university president Stephen Sundborg, SJ, Seattle changed its nickname from Chieftains to Redhawks in January 2000. Seattle rejoined the NCAA in 2001 and competed in Division III for a year, then in Division II from 2002 to 2009.

For the 2009–10 academic year, Seattle's varsity teams played full schedules against Division I opponents. Although it was then a Division I independent, the university had initially hoped to rejoin the West Coast Conference (where they played before leaving the NCAA in 1980), since all nine current members were private, religiously affiliated institutions (seven are Catholic and four share Seattle University's Jesuit affiliation). Seattle also explored membership in the Big Sky Conference, although all of its members played FCS football.

Seattle once again became eligible for Division I NCAA Championships beginning in 2012–13, and is a full Division I-AAA member (no football) in all 20 sports.

During the 2010–14 NCAA conference realignment, the Western Athletic Conference (WAC) saw a large number of their members leave. From 2011 to 2013, twelve schools left the WAC. In June 2011, the WAC invited Seattle to join as a full member beginning July 2012. Seattle accepted soon after for all of the sports it sponsors at the varsity level except rowing, which the WAC does not sponsor and, initially, men's swimming and diving, which the WAC did not sponsor at the time. Men's swimming and diving was added as a WAC-sponsored sport in 2013. The conference dropped football after the 2012 season and in the summer of 2013, only three members from the prior year remained in the conference (Seattle, New Mexico State, and Idaho). The WAC added six new members in 2013, and when Idaho returned to the Big Sky in 2014 (& Sun Belt for football), Seattle became the second-longest tenured WAC school after just three seasons in the league. Since joining the conference, the Redhawks have claimed five team titles and three individual titles, and have had four student-athletes named player of the year.

Stephanie Verdoia, women's soccer forward, was named two-time WAC Player of the Year, two time Academic All-American and was named an All-American and the Academic All-American of the Year for women's soccer in 2014. Verdoia also received the Senior CLASS Award as the sport's top scholar-athlete nationally and was the named the 2015 Seattle Sports Commission Female Sports Star of the Year.

In 2018, Seattle University's board of trustees renamed the Connolly Complex the Redhawk Center due to Archbishop Thomas Connolly's failure to act on a known abusive priest.

In 2024, the men's basketball team won the 2024 College Basketball Invitational.

On May 10, 2024, the university announced that it would rejoin the West Coast Conference as a full member on July 1, 2025, following a 45-year absence. When the announcement was made, it was expected that they would be joining the conference along with rival Grand Canyon University from the WAC while also having the opportunity to reignite a rivalry with Gonzaga, the other Jesuit University in Washington State. However, spurred on by the collapse of the PAC-12 and the resulting conference realignment, Gonzaga announced their intention to leave the WCC for the PAC-12 and GCU declined the invitation to join the WCC and instead announced their intention to move to the Mountain West Conference.

== National championships ==
Seattle University is credited with three official team championships, two at the NAIA level and one NCAA championship.

Association	Division	Sport	Year	Opponent/Runner-Up	Score
NAIA	Division I	Men's Soccer	1997	Rockhurst	2-1 (OT)
NAIA	Division I	Men's Swimming	2002	California Baptist	487-444
NCAA	Division II	Men's Soccer	2004	SIU - Edwardsville	2-1

== Sports sponsored ==
Seattle University sponsors teams in nine men's and 11 women's NCAA sanctioned sports: The women's rowing team competes as an independent.

Men's sports	Women's sports
Baseball	Basketball
Basketball	Cross Country
Cross Country	Golf
Golf	Rowing
Soccer	Soccer
Swimming	Softball
Tennis	Swimming
Track & Field^{†}	Tennis
	Track & Field^{†}
	Volleyball
† = Track and field includes both indoor and outdoor.

=== WAC Titles ===
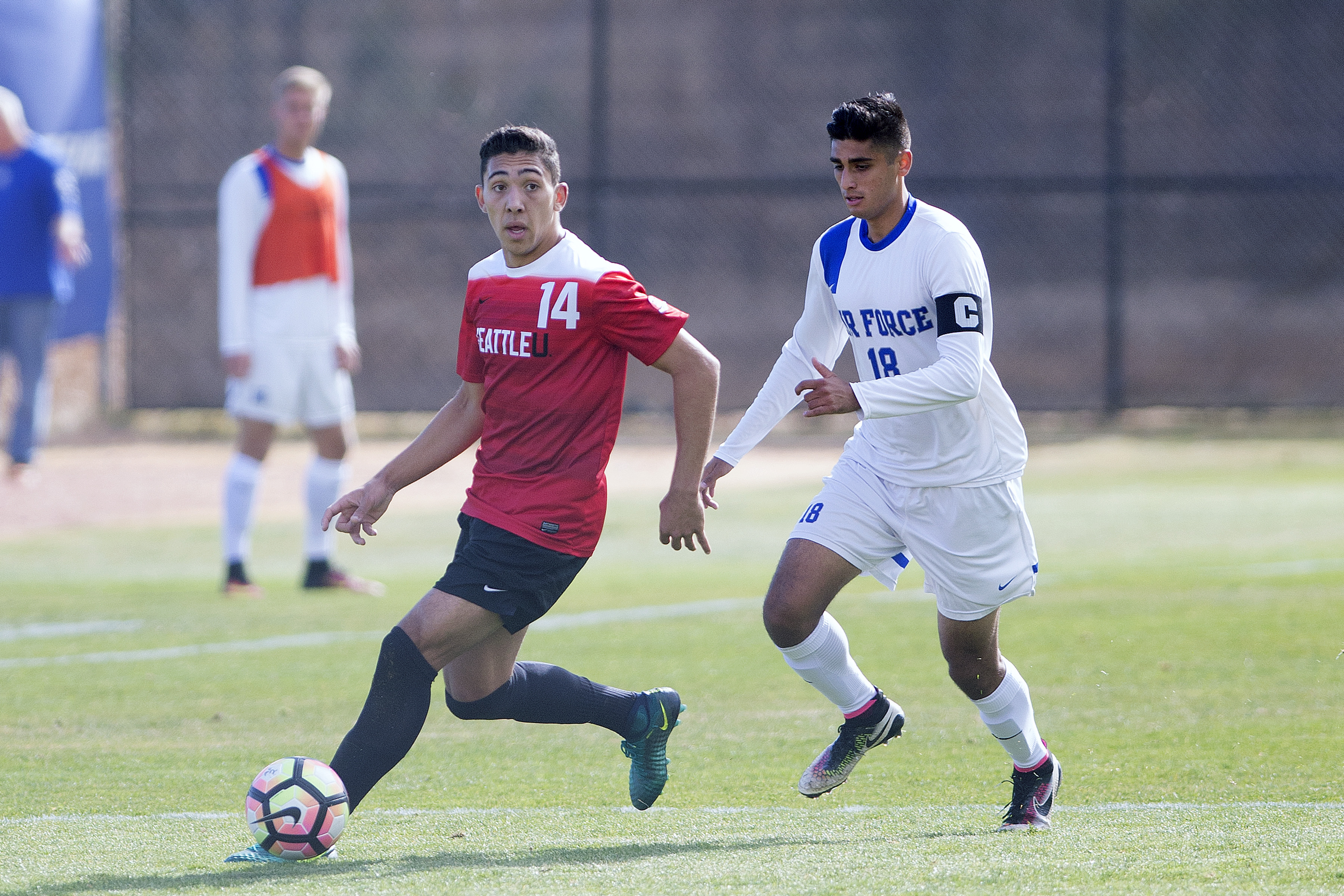
Seattle v Air Force soccer match in 2016

Baseball
Regular Season (1): 2016

Men's Basketball
Regular Season (1): 2022

Men's Golf
Regular Season (2): 2017, 2025

Men's Soccer
Regular Season (3): 2013, 2015, 2019, 2023
Tournament (5): 2013, 2015, 2017, 2019, 2021

Women's Basketball
Regular Season (1): 2013
Tournament (1): 2018

Women's Cross Country
Regular Season (1): 2014

Women's Soccer
Regular Season (6): 2013, 2014, 2015, 2016, 2019, 2020
Tournament (5): 2013, 2014, 2016, 2018, 2019

Softball
Regular Season (1): 2019
Tournament (2): 2019, 2021

== Athletic facilities ==
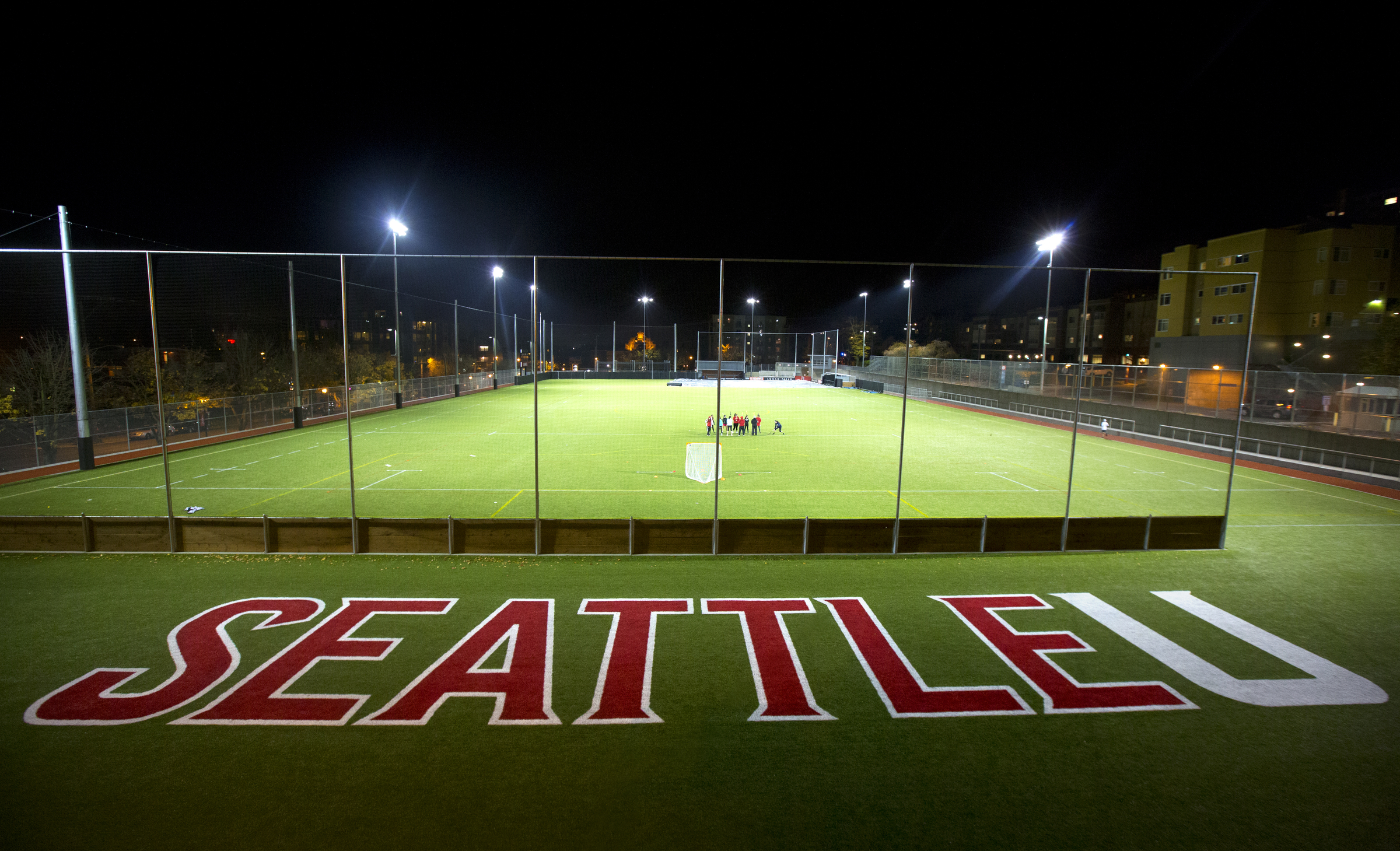
Seattle U Park

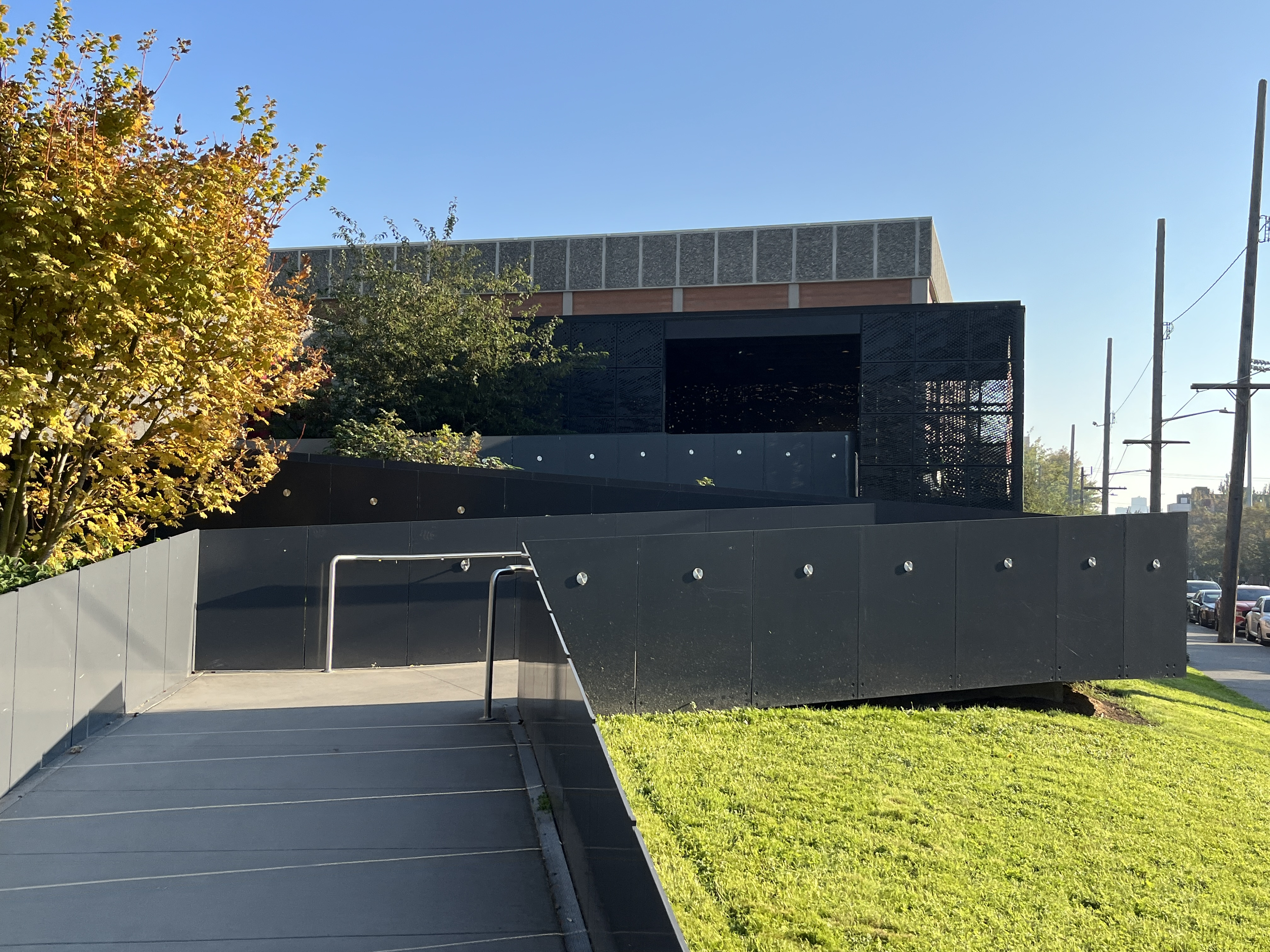
Redhawk Center

Venue	Sport	Capacity
Bannerwood Park	Baseball	300+
Redhawk Center (Note: Seattle U also uses Climate Pledge Arena as home venue.)	Basketball; Volleyball	1,000
Seattle Rowing Center	Rowing	
Championship Field	Soccer	650+
Francis Logan Field	Softball	250
Redhawk Center Pool	Swimming	
Seattle University Tennis Courts	Tennis	
