= Seattle Redhawks men's basketball =

2026–27 Seattle Redhawks men's basketball team
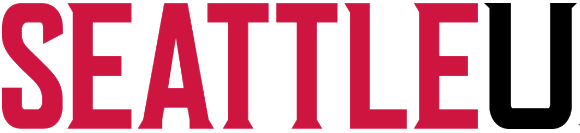
- University: Seattle University
- Head coach: Chris Victor (6th season)
- Location: Seattle, Washington
- Arena: Redhawk Center / Climate Pledge Arena (capacity: 999 / 18,100)
- Conference: West Coast Conference
- Nickname: Redhawks
- Colors: Red and white

NCAA Division I tournament runner-up
- 1958
Other NCAA Division I tournament results
Final Four	1958
Elite Eight	1958
Sweet Sixteen	1953, 1955, 1956, 1958, 1964
Appearances	1953, 1954, 1955, 1956, 1958, 1961, 1962, 1963, 1964, 1967, 1969, 2007* *at Division II level

Conference regular-season champions
- 2007, 2022

Uniforms
Home	Away

The Seattle Redhawks men's basketball team represents Seattle University in NCAA Division I basketball competition. The Redhawks are currently coached by Chris Victor. Established in 1946, the team was previously known as the Seattle Chieftains. The program experienced success during the 1950s and 1960s, reaching the NCAA Division I tournament eleven times. Led by Elgin Baylor (the future 1958 number one draft pick), Seattle finished as the runner-up in the 1958 NCAA University Division basketball tournament.

Seattle was a member of NCAA Division I before budget problems led them to reclassify to NAIA in 1980. They eventually rose to NCAA Division II before rejoining the Division I level for the 2009-10 season. Seattle is a member of the West Coast Conference, which they rejoined in 2025 after prior membership from 1971 to 1980. They were previously a member of the Western Athletic Conference from 2012 to 2025. The Redhawks last appeared in the NCAA Division I men's basketball tournament in 1969.

== History ==
Notable alumni of Seattle University basketball include Elgin Baylor, Johnny O'Brien, Eddie O'Brien, Charlie Brown, Eddie Miles, Clint Richardson, John Tresvant, Tom Workman, Frank Oleynick, Charlie Williams, Jawann Oldham, Charles Garcia, Plummer Lott, and Terrell Brown Jr.

=== 1950s and 1960s: National prominence ===
Established in 1946, the program experienced a period of success during the 1950s and 1960s. Seattle produced more NBA players than any other school from 1960 to 1969. From 1953 to 1969, the Seattle Chieftains reached the NCAA tournament 11 times.

On January 21, 1952, the Seattle Chieftains beat the Harlem Globetrotters in a stunning 84–81 upset, led by Johnny O'Brien. In 1952, O'Brien became the first collegiate player to score 1,000 points in a season. Six years later, Elgin Baylor led the Chieftains to the championship game of the 1958 NCAA tournament. Seattle defeated top-ranked Kansas State in the Final Four, but fell to the Kentucky Wildcats in Louisville on March 22. Despite finishing runner-up, Baylor was named the tournament's Most Outstanding Player and was the first selection of the 1958 NBA draft in April.

Seattle joined the West Coast Conference from 1971 to 1980. In 1974, Frank Oleynick was named WCC Player of the Year.

=== 1980s to 2000s: NAIA and Rejoining NCAA ===
In 1980, local economic depression and mounting financial pressures for athletics competitiveness led the university to de-emphasize athletics and enter NAIA. After over 20 years in NAIA, Seattle rejoined the NCAA as a Division III member in 2001 and as a Division II member in 2002, joining the Great Northwest Athletic Conference in 2002. In 2007, Seattle won a share of the GNAC regular season title with Seattle Pacific, and was invited to the 2007 NCAA Division II tournament, the program's first postseason tournament appearance since 1969.

In 2008, the program rejoined the Division I level. In 2009, Cameron Dollar was hired as the new head coach to replace Joe Callero. From 2008 to 2012, Seattle played as an independent during NCAA reclassification. They declined an invitation to the now-defunct Great West Conference, and applied for membership with the West Coast Conference, Big Sky Conference, and Big West Conference, but were turned down.

=== 2012 to 2025: Western Athletic Conference ===
In 2012, Seattle joined the Western Athletic Conference during the 2010–14 NCAA conference realignment. Seattle lost to New Mexico State in the 2015 WAC tournament finals. Seattle earned an invite to the 2015 CBI tournament, their first Division I postseason appearance since 1969, beating Pepperdine and Colorado before losing to Loyola (Ill.) in the semifinals. Seattle earned an invite to the 2016 CBI tournament, beating Idaho in the first round before losing to Vermont in the quarterfinals. Dollar was fired in 2017 after compiling a 107–138 record and two CBI appearances at Seattle.

On March 29, 2017, Jim Hayford was hired as the Redhawks' head coach to replace Dollar, coming from rival Eastern Washington. In his first year as head coach, Hayford compiled a 20–14 record, the Redhawks' first 20-win season since 2008 and first 20-win season in Division I play since the 1960s. The Redhawks fell to Central Arkansas in the first round of the 2018 CBI tournament. In his second year, Hayford compiled an 18–15 record, marking the Redhawks' first back-to-back 18+ win seasons since 2008–09 and 2009–10. The Redhawks fell to Presbyterian in the first round of the 2019 CIT tournament. Hayford resigned in 2021 after compiling a 64–55 record and two CBI appearances at Seattle.

Following Hayford's resignation, Chris Victor was named interim head coach in 2021, and was named head coach in 2022. In Victor's first year as head coach, Seattle was named WAC regular season co-champions with a 23-9 record, the Redhawks' winningest season since the 1950s. Victor was named the 2022 Don Haskins WAC Coach of the Year, and was also named the 2022 NABC Coach of the Year for District 6.

During the 2022–23 season, Seattle earned its first appearance in a Division I national poll since the 1964–65 season, receiving votes in the January 23 Coaches Poll, while also earning its highest-ever NET ranking at No. 61. Seattle won the 2024 CBI tournament over High Point for its first-ever championship title. From 2021 to 2024, the Redhawks went three straight seasons with 20+ wins, their first such streak since 1957–59.

=== 2025 to present: West Coast Conference ===
In 2025, Seattle rejoined the West Coast Conference, after its initial membership from 1971 to 1980. Seattle's 12–3 record to start the 2025–26 season marked the Redhawks' best start since their 1963–64 season. In 2026, Seattle's Will Heimbrodt was named WCC Defensive Player of the Year, after ranking No. 6 nationally in blocked shots (2.53 per game) and ranking No. 1 in conference games in blocked shots (2.4 per game).

== Home court ==
When Seattle returned to Division I in 2009, the Redhawks began playing the majority of their home games at KeyArena at Seattle Center. Following the 2017-18 season, KeyArena was closed for major refurbishment. During the closure, the Redhawks played the majority of their home schedule on-campus at the Redhawk Center. Seattle U also hosted its CBI games at the Redhawk Center in 2015 while KeyArena was in use for the NCAA men's basketball tournament. In 2021, following a two-year refurbishment, the former KeyArena reopened as Climate Pledge Arena.

Seattle now splits its home schedule between Climate Pledge Arena and the Redhawk Center. The team has also played select games at the ShoWare Center in Kent, Washington, known as the "ShoWare Classic."

== Rivalries ==
Seattle U has two recognized rivals: Washington and Eastern Washington.

=== Washington ===
Despite the two teams' proximity, their first meeting only occurred in the West-2 Regional semifinal round of the 1953 NCAA basketball tournament. The teams did not meet again until 1969, when they began a split home-and-home series, as played annually until 1980, and renewed again in 2009. The rivalry is known as the "Battle for Seattle."

Washington leads the series 35–6. In 2024, in the 40th meeting between the teams, Seattle snapped a 46-year old, 19-game losing streak in the rivalry with a 79-70 victory. The Redhawks defeated the Huskies again in 2025, the first time that Seattle claimed consecutive victories in the rivalry.

As of 2026, the series was put on hiatus after Washington dropped Seattle U from the schedule.

=== Eastern Washington ===
Seattle U and Eastern Washington have engaged in the "Intrastate Battle" rivalry game on a regular basis since 2009.

Eastern Washington leads the series 9–8. In 2017, a new chapter in the rivalry began when Jim Hayford left his head coaching position at EWU for the same job at Seattle U. Hayford's assistant, Shantay Legans, was hired as his successor. On December 3, 2017, in Hayford's first game against his former team and assistant, Seattle U won 85–64.

== Postseason appearances ==
=== NCAA Division I tournament ===
Seattle has made the NCAA Division I tournament 11 times. They have a combined record of 10–13. The Redhawks have not reached the NCAA Division I Tournament since 1969, which is the fifth longest drought between appearances in NCAA Division I Tournament history, although they were not in Division I for 29 years of the drought.

Year	Round	Opponent	Result
1953	First Round; Sweet Sixteen; Regional third place	Idaho State; Washington; Wyoming	W 88–77; L 70–92; W 80–64
1954	First Round	Idaho State	L 75–77 ^{OT}
1955	First Round; Sweet Sixteen; Regional third place	Idaho State; Oregon State; Utah	W 80–63; L 71–83; L 85–108
1956	First Round; Sweet Sixteen; Regional third place	Idaho State; Utah; UCLA	W 68–66; L 72–81; L 70–94
1958	First Round; Sweet Sixteen; Elite Eight; Final Four; Championship Game	Wyoming; San Francisco; California; Kansas State; Kentucky	W 88–51; W 69–67; W 66–62 ^{OT} W 73–51; L 72–84
1961	First Round	Arizona State	L 70–72
1962	First Round	Oregon State	L 65–69 ^{OT}
1963	First Round	Oregon State	L 66–70
1964	First Round; Sweet Sixteen; Regional third place	Oregon State; UCLA; Utah State	W 61–57; L 90–95; W 88–78
1967	First Round	Texas Western	L 54–62
1969	First Round	Weber State	L 73–75

=== NCAA Division II ===
In their time in NCAA Division II, Seattle made the tournament once. They had a record of 1–1.

Year	Round	Opponent	Result
2007	First Round; Second Round	Cal Poly; Cal State San Bernardino	W 69–55; L 66–72

=== NIT appearances ===
Seattle has made three appearances in the National Invitation Tournament (NIT). They have a combined record of 1–3.

Year	Round	Opponent	Result
1952	First Round	Holy Cross	L 72–77
1957	Quarterfinals	St. Bonaventure	L 68–85
2026	First Round; Second Round	St. Thomas (1) Auburn	W 67–52; L 85–91

=== CBI appearances ===
Seattle has made four appearances in the College Basketball Invitational (CBI). They have a combined record of 7–3. They won the championship in 2024.

Year	Round	Opponent	Result
2015	First Round; Quarterfinals; Semifinals	Pepperdine; Colorado; Loyola–Chicago	W 62–45; W 72–65; L 48–63
2016	First Round; Quarterfinals	Idaho; Vermont	W 68–63; L 53–74
2018	First Round	Central Arkansas	L 90–92^{OT}
2024	First Round; Second Round; Semifinals; Championship Game	Delaware State; Evansville; Fairfield; High Point	W 79–66; W 71–57; W 75–58; W 77–67

=== CIT appearances ===
Seattle made their first appearance in the CIT tournament in 2019. They have a combined record of 0–1.

Year	Round	Opponent	Result
2019	First Round	Presbyterian	L 68–73

== Awards and honors ==
=== Retired numbers ===
Seattle U has retired six jersey numbers, with the most recent being Tom Workman on February 5, 2011.

Seattle Redhawks retired numbers
No.	Player	Pos.	Career
3	Ed O'Brien		1950–1953
4	John O'Brien		1950–1953
20	Eddie Miles	F	1960–1963
22	Elgin Baylor	SF	1956–1958
32	Tom Workman	C	1964–1966
44	Clint Richardson	SG	1975–1979

=== Conference awards ===
==== Coach of the Year ====
- 2022 – Chris Victor – WAC Coach of the Year
- 2022 – Chris Victor – NABC Coach of the Year for District 6

==== Player of the Year ====
- 1974 – Frank Oleynick – WCC Player of the Year

==== Defensive Player of the Year ====
- 2026 – Will Heimbrodt -- WCC Defensive Player of the Year

==== Freshman of the Year ====
- 1976 – Clint Richardson – WCC Freshman of the Year

== Season-by-season records ==
Record table
Season	Coach	Overall	Conference	Standing	Postseason
Seattle (Independent) (1946–1971)
1946–47	Len Yandle, Bill Fenton	18–12			
1947–48	Len Yandle, Bill Fenton	10–16			
1948–49	Al Brightman	12–14			
1949–50	Al Brightman	12–17			
1950–51	Al Brightman	32–5			
1951–52	Al Brightman	29–8			NIT first round
1952–53	Al Brightman	29–4			NCAA Regional third place
1953–54	Al Brightman	26–2			NCAA first round
1954–55	Al Brightman	22–7			NCAA Regional Fourth Place
1955–56	Al Brightman	18–11			NCAA Regional Fourth Place
1956–57	John Castellani	24–3			NIT Quarterfinals
1957–58	John Castellani	23–6			NCAA Runner-up
1958–59	Vincent Cazzetta	23–6			
1959–60	Vincent Cazzetta	16–10			
1960–61	Vincent Cazzetta	18–8			NCAA first round
1961–62	Vincent Cazzetta	18–9			NCAA first round
1962–63	Vincent Cazzetta	21–6			NCAA first round
1963–64	Bob Boyd	22–6			NCAA Regional third place
1964–65	Bob Boyd	19–7			
1965–66	Lionell Purcell	16–10			
1966–67	Lionell Purcell	18–8			NCAA first round
1967–68	Morris Buckwalter	15–14			
1968–69	Morris Buckwalter	20–8			NCAA first round
1969–70	Morris Buckwalter	15–10			
1970–71	Morris Buckwalter	12–14			
Seattle (West Coast Conference) (1971–1980)
1971–72	Morris Buckwalter	17–9	10–4	3rd	
1972–73	William O'Connor	13–13	6–8	T–5th	
1973–74	William O'Connor	15–11	11–3	2nd	
1974–75	William O'Connor	8–18	6–8	6th	
1975–76	William O'Connor	11–16	6–6	4th	
1976–77	William O'Connor	14–14	7–7	T–3rd	
1977–78	William O'Connor	11–17	6–8	5th	
1978–79	Jack Schalow	16–11	8–6	4th	
1979–80	Jack Schalow	12–15	8–8	7th	
Seattle (Independent) (1980–1992)
1980–81	Jack Schalow	9–13			
1981–82	Len Nardone	6–22			
1982–83	Len Nardone	15–16			
1983–84	Len Nardone	14–14			
1984–85	Len Nardone	21–12			
1985–86	Bob Johnson	10–20			
1986–87	Bob Johnson	17–13			
1987–88	Bob Johnson	13–17			
1988–89	Bob Johnson	7–23			
1989–90	Bob Johnson	10–20			
1990–91	Bob Johnson	16–15			
1991–92	Al Hairston	14–17			
1992–93	Al Hairston	6–24			
1993–94	Al Hairston	17–14			
1994–95	Al Hairston	10–20			
1995–96	Al Hairston	14–17			
1996–97	Al Hairston	13–18			
Seattle (Northwest Conference) (1997–1999)
1997–98	Al Hairston	4–20	3–15	10th	
1998–99	Al Hairston	4–20	4–14	10th	
Seattle (Independent) (1999–2001)
1999–00	Al Hairston	7–17			
2000–01	Dave Cox	6–21			
Seattle (Great Northwest Athletic Conference) (2001–2008)
2001–02	Joe Callero	6–23	4–14	9th	
2002–03	Joe Callero	16–11	9–9	7th	
2003–04	Joe Callero	9–18	5–13	T–8th	
2004–05	Joe Callero	11–16	6–12	8th	
2005–06	Joe Callero	16–11	9–9	7th	
2006–07	Joe Callero	20–9	11–5	T–1st	NCAA Division II Second Round
2007–08	Joe Callero	18–9	11–7	8th	
Seattle (Independent) (2008–2012)
2008–09	Joe Callero	21–8			
2009–10	Cameron Dollar	17–14			
2010–11	Cameron Dollar	11–20			
2011–12	Cameron Dollar	12–15			
Seattle (Western Athletic Conference) (2012–2025)
2012–13	Cameron Dollar	8–22	3–15	10th	
2013–14	Cameron Dollar	13–17	5–11	8th	
2014–15	Cameron Dollar	18–16	7–7	4th	CBI semifinals
2015–16	Cameron Dollar	15–17	7–7	4th	CBI Quarterfinals
2016–17	Cameron Dollar	13–17	5–9	6th	
2017–18	Jim Hayford	20–14	8–6	4th	CBI first round
2018–19	Jim Hayford	18–15	6–10	7th	CIT first round
2019–20	Jim Hayford	14–15	7–7	T–5th	
2020-21	Jim Hayford	12-11	4-5	5th	
2021-22	Chris Victor	23-9	14-4	T-1st	
2022-23	Chris Victor	20-12	11-7	T-4th	
2023-24	Chris Victor	23-14	11-9	T-4th	CBI Champion
2024-25	Chris Victor	14-18	8-8	T-5th	
Seattle (West Coast Conference) (2025–present)
2025-26	Chris Victor				
Total:					
National champion Postseason invitational champion Conference regular season champion Conference regular season and conference tournament champion Division regular season champion Division regular season and conference tournament champion Conference tournament champion

== In popular culture ==
The 2006 film Glory Road depicts the 1956-66 Texas Western team, coached by Don Haskins, the first team with an all-black starting lineup to win the national championship. As depicted in the film, Seattle dealt Texas Western (now UTEP) its only defeat of its historic season.
