= 1958 NCAA University Division basketball championship game =

1958 NCAA Tournament Championship Game
National championship game
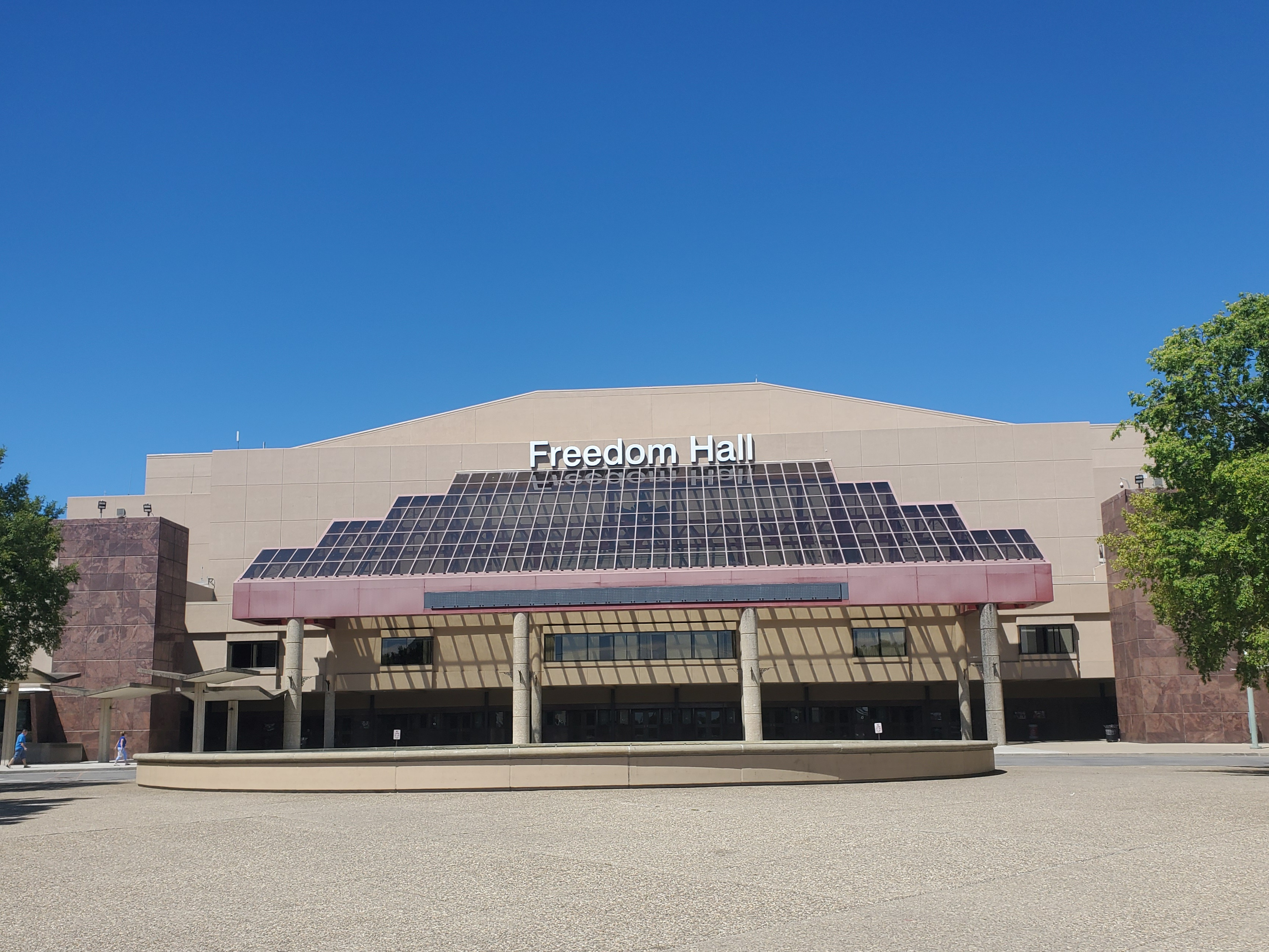
- Freedom Hall in Louisville, Kentucky, hosted the championship game.
Seattle Chieftains	Kentucky Wildcats
Independent	SEC
(23-7)	(22-6)
72	84
Head coach: John Castellani	Head coach: Adolph Rupp
- AP: 18
- Coaches: 19
- AP: 9
- Coaches: 14
	1st half	2nd half	Total
Seattle Chieftains	39	33	72
Kentucky Wildcats	36	48	84
- Date: March 22, 1958
- Venue: Freedom Hall, Louisville, Kentucky
- MVP: Elgin Baylor, Seattle
- Attendance: 18,803

The 1958 NCAA University Division Basketball Championship Game was the finals of the 1958 NCAA University Division basketball tournament and it determined the national champion for the 1957-58 NCAA University Division men's basketball season. The game was played on March 22, 1958, at Freedom Hall in Louisville, Kentucky. It featured the independent Seattle Chieftains, and the Kentucky Wildcats of the Southeastern Conference.

== Participating teams ==
=== Seattle Chieftains ===
- West
  - Seattle 69, San Francisco 67
  - Seattle 66, California 62 (OT)
- Final Four
  - Seattle 73, Kansas State 51

=== Kentucky Wildcats ===
- Mideast
  - Kentucky 94, Miami (OH) 70
  - Kentucky 89, Notre Dame 56
- Final Four
  - Kentucky 61, Temple 60

== Game summary ==
March 22, 1958

#9 Kentucky Wildcats 84, #18 Seattle Chieftains 72
Scoring by half: 36-39, 48-33
Pts: Vernon Hatton 30; Rebs: Johnny Cox 16	Pts: Elgin Baylor 25; Rebs: Elgin Baylor 19

Freedom Hall, Louisville, Kentucky
Attendance: 18,803
