= John Crigler =

American basketball player

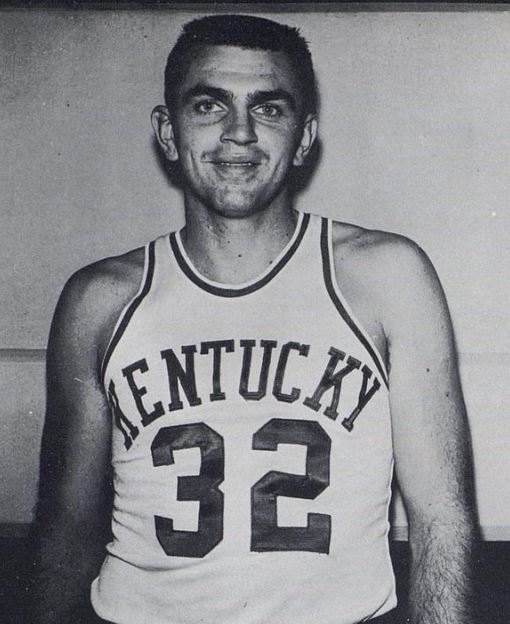
- Crigler from the 1958 Kentuckian

Personal information
- Born: May 31, 1936 Hebron, Kentucky, U.S.
- Died: December 1, 2012 (aged 76) Georgetown, Kentucky, U.S.
- Listed height: 6 ft 3 in (1.91 m)
- Listed weight: 180 lb (82 kg)

Career information
- High school: Hebron (Hebron, Kentucky)
- College: Kentucky (1955–1958)
- NBA draft: 1958: undrafted
- Position: Forward
- Number: 32

Career highlights
- NCAA Champion (1958)

John Lloyd Crigler (May 31, 1936 – December 1, 2012) was an American basketball player best known as a starting forward for the "Fiddlin' Five," the University of Kentucky's 1958 NCAA championship team.

Crigler, a 6'3" forward from Hebron, Kentucky, played three years for the Wildcats from 1955 to 1958. As a junior in 1956–57, Crigler was fourth on the team in scoring at 10.1 points per game as the team went 23–5 and were Southeastern Conference champions. As a senior in 1957–58, Crigler increased his scoring to 13.6 per game and helped lead the Wildcats to the 1958 NCAA championship. Crigler had 14 points and 14 rebounds in the final against Seattle University, led by Elgin Baylor.

Following the close of his Kentucky career, Crigler became a high school teacher, coach and administrator at Scott County High School in Georgetown, Kentucky for more than 40 years.

Crigler died on December 1, 2012.
