= Ed Beck =

American basketball player (1936–2019)

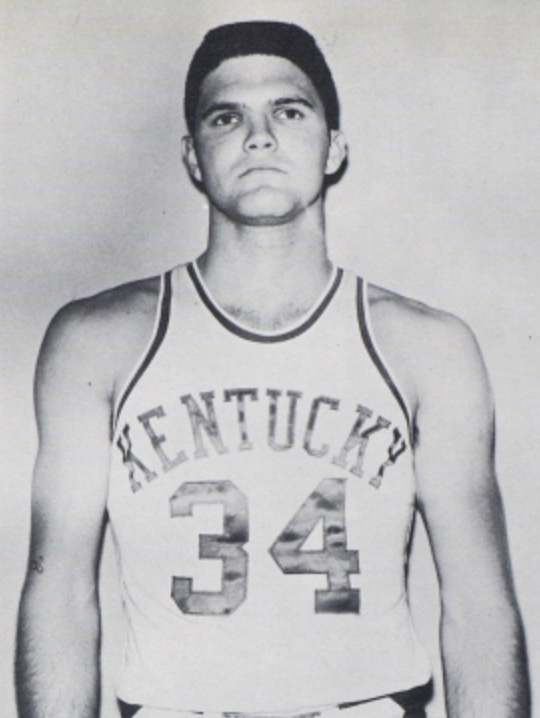
- Beck from the 1958 Kentuckian

Personal information
- Born: June 28, 1936
- Died: October 16, 2019 (aged 83) Sun City, Arizona, U.S.
- Listed height: 6 ft 7 in (2.01 m)
- Listed weight: 188 lb (85 kg)

Career information
- High school: Fort Valley (Fort Valley, Georgia)
- College: Kentucky (1955–1958)
- NBA draft: 1958: undrafted
- Position: Center
- Number: 34

Career highlights
- NCAA champion (1958); SEC Defensive Player of the Year (1958); Second-team All-SEC (1957)

Edward Paul Beck (June 28, 1936 – October 16, 2019) was an American college basketball player. He is best known as the starting center and team captain of the "Fiddlin' Five," the University of Kentucky's 1958 NCAA championship team.

Beck was recruited to play at Kentucky after scoring 1,549 points and leading his team to win two state titles at Fort Valley High School. Beck was named team captain by head coach Adolph Rupp going into his senior season after scoring 259 points and grabbing 380 rebounds as a junior. As a senior, Beck scored 163 points and had 337 rebounds in 29 games and was named Southeastern Conference (SEC) Defensive Player of the Year. Beck finished his college career with 459 points scored (5.6 per game) and 783 rebounds (10.0 per game) in 78 total games.

After his collegiate career ended Beck opted not to play professionally, turning down a contract from the New York Knicks. He decided to pursue a career in ministry and became an ordained Methodist minister after graduating from the Candler School of Theology at Emory University. He died on October 16, 2019, in Sun City, Arizona, at the age of 83.
