= John Castellani =

American basketball player and coach (1926–2021)

Biographical details
- Born: August 23, 1926; New Britain, Connecticut, U.S.
- Died: May 11, 2021 (aged 94); New Britain, Connecticut, U.S.
- Education: University of Notre Dame; Marquette University (J.D.)

Coaching career (HC unless noted)
- 195x–1956: Notre Dame (asst.)
- 1956–1958: Seattle
- 1959–1960: Minneapolis Lakers

Administrative career (AD unless noted)
- 1956–1959: Seattle

Accomplishments and honors

Championships
- NCAA Regional – Final Four (1958)

John Louis Castellani (August 23, 1926 – May 11, 2021) was an American attorney and a former basketball coach. He coached the Minneapolis Lakers in the NBA during the 1959–1960 season, their last before relocating to Los Angeles. Prior to his short coaching stint with the Lakers, Castellani was the head coach at Seattle University from 1956 to 1958, and took the Chieftains to the 12-team National Invitation Tournament (NIT) in his first year. With Elgin Baylor starring in his lineup, Castellani led the 1958 team to the NCAA title game in Louisville, Kentucky, but lost 84–72 to the Kentucky Wildcats, led by head coach Adolph Rupp. At the age of 31 he is the youngest head coach to lead a team to the national championship game.

Only a month after the championship game, NCAA violations came to light concerning airfare bought for recruits Ben Warley and George Finley. The result was that Castellani resigned under fire on April 21, Baylor left for the NBA, and Seattle was given a two-year postseason ban. Castellani returned to coaching for one year as head coach for the Lakers in the 1959–60 NBA season and again coached Baylor.

After he was released by the Lakers, he attended law school at Marquette University in Milwaukee, Wisconsin. For over half a century, he practiced as an attorney in Milwaukee and was frequently seen at Milwaukee Bucks and Marquette Golden Eagles basketball games.

Castellani died of natural causes at his home in New Britain, Connecticut, on May 11, 2021, at the age of 94.

== Head coaching record ==
=== College ===
Record table
Season	Team	Overall	Conference	Standing	Postseason
Seattle Chieftains (Independent) (1956–1958)
1956–57	Seattle	22–3			NIT Quarterfinal
1957–58	Seattle	23–6			NCAA University Division Runner-up
Seattle:		45–9 (.833)			
Total:		45–9 (.833)			

== NBA ==
Team	Year	G	W	L	W–L%	Finish	PG	PW	PL	PW–L%	Result
Minneapolis	1959–60	36	11	25	.306	(didn't finish the season)	—	—	—	—	—
Career		36	11	25	.306		0	0	0	–	

== See also ==
- List of NCAA Division I Men's Final Four appearances by coach
