= Mel Brodsky =

American basketball player

Personal information
- Listed height: 6 ft 2 in (1.88 m)

Career information
- High school: Overbrook (Philadelphia, Pennsylvania)
- College: Temple (1955–1958)
- NBA draft: 1958: undrafted

Career history

Coaching
- 1969–1973: Villanova (assistant)

Mel Brodsky is an American former basketball player. As a player at Temple University, Brodsky was a member of two Temple Final Four teams in 1956 and 1958 and was an All-America honorable mention in 1958.

== Early life ==
Brodsky is a native of Philadelphia, Pennsylvania. He attended Overbrook High School in Philadelphia.

== Playing career ==
Brodsky played college basketball at Temple University in the 1950s. As a junior in 1956-57 he averaged 13.1 points and 4.2 rebounds per game. As a senior in 1957-58 he averaged 10.9 points and 7.5 rebounds per game. He was a member of the two greatest Temple teams of all-time, the 1956 and 1958 Final Four teams.

Brodsky won a multitude of awards while at Temple including All-Philadelphia Big Five selection in 1957, a gold medal at the Maccabiah Games in 1957, All-America honorable mention in 1958, All-Philadelphia Big Five honors in 1958, and All-East honors in 1958.

He was offered a chance to play for the Minneapolis Lakers in 1958 but rejected the offer to stay close to home and played in the Eastern Pro League in 1959.

== Post-playing career ==
Brodsky was an assistant coach to Jack Kraft at Villanova University from 1969 to 1973. Brodsky was a member of the 1971 Villanova team that made it to the 1971 championship game, losing to UCLA. This was Brodsky's third Final Four exit without winning an NCAA championship.

After his playing career, Brodsky had a 35-year career in coaching and teaching, leading to him becoming a school principal. He also bought Camp Green Lane, a summer camp in Green Lane, Pennsylvania.

== Halls of fame ==
Brodsky is an inductee in the Philadelphia Jewish Sports Hall of Fame.
