= Bob Johnson (basketball coach) =

American basketball player and coach

Playing career
- 1962–1964: Moberly JC
- 1964–1966: Washington

Coaching career (HC unless noted)

Basketball
- 1969–1973: Seattle CC
- 1973–1974: Franklin HS (WA)
- 1974–1975: Tufts
- 1975–1985: Washington (assistant)
- 1985–1991: Seattle
- 2000–2002: Wofford (assistant)

Head coaching record
- Overall: 9–11 (NCAA); 73–103 (NAIA)

Robert L. Johnson is an American retired basketball coach who was the head men's basketball at Tufts (1974–1975) and Seattle (1985–1991).

== Playing ==
Johnson played high school basketball in Houston, then played for Cotton Fitzsimmons at Moberly Junior College. He finished his collegiate career at Washington, where he 4.8 points per game and 3.5 rebounds per game over two seasons (1964–65 and 1965–66). He played one season of professional basketball in Belgium.

== Coaching ==
From 1969 to 1973, Johnson was the head coach at Seattle Community College. He then spent a season as the head coach at Franklin High School. He was the head coach at Tufts during the 1974–75 season, compiling a 9–11 record. He then returned to his alma mater as an assistant coach. He recruited UW stars Detlef Schrempf and James Edwards. When head coach Marv Harshman retired in 1985, Johnson was not interviewed for the position and Harshman's successor, Andy Russo, did not retain him as an assistant. He instead accepted the head coaching job at Seattle. In six seasons, Johnson had a 73-103 record. The Chieftains finished the 1990–91 season with a 16–15 record and an appearance in the NAIA District playoffs, but Johnson was let go that summer.

After leaving Seattle, Johnson remained in Washington and worked as an athletic director at the high school level. In 1996, he moved to South Carolina, where he purchased two McDonald's franchises. In 2000, he returned to college basketball as an assistant at Wofford after Dan Peterson was forced to resign due to personal issues.

== Personal life ==
Johnson and his wife, Laetitia, have two sons. Their younger son, Chris, was a starting cornerback for the Stanford Cardinal football team, from 1997 to 1999.
