= 1957–58 Temple Owls men's basketball team =

American college basketball season

1957–58 Temple Owls men's basketball

NCAA tournament, Third place
- Conference: Independent

Ranking
- Coaches: No. 5
- AP: No. 5
- Record: 27–3
- Head coach: Harry Litwack (6th season)
- Home arena: The Palestra

The 1957–58 Temple Owls men's basketball team represented Temple University during the 1957–58 NCAA University Division men's basketball season. The team was led by head coach Harry Litwack and played their home games at The Palestra in Philadelphia, Pennsylvania. Playing out of the East region, the Owls made a run to the Final Four of the NCAA tournament. In the National semifinals, Temple lost to eventual champion Kentucky, 61–60. The Owls bounced back to defeat Kansas State in the consolation game to finish with a record of 27–3. It was the second time in three seasons Temple reached the Final Four and took third place.

== Roster ==
1957–58 Temple Owls men's basketball team
Players
Coaches

Pos.	#	Name	Height	Weight	Year	Previous school	Hometown
G	3	Bill Kennedy	5 ft 11 in (1.8 m)	170 lb (77 kg)	So	Abraham Lincoln HS	Philadelphia, PA
G	5	Guy Rodgers	6 ft 0 in (1.83 m)	185 lb (84 kg)	Sr	Northeast HS	Philadelphia, PA
		Jay Norman	6 ft 3 in (1.91 m)	—	Sr
		Mel Brodsky	6 ft 2 in (1.88 m)	—	Sr
		Tink Van Patton	6 ft 8 in (2.03 m)	—	Sr
		Dan Fleming	6 ft 6 in (1.98 m)	—	Sr
		Ophie Franklin	6 ft 4 in (1.93 m)	—	Jr
		Joe Goldenberg	5 ft 7 in (1.7 m)	—	Jr

Head coach

- Harry Litwack

Assistant coach(es)

Legend

- (C) Team captain
- (S) Suspended
- (I) Ineligible
- (W) Walk-on
- Injured
- Current redshirt

Roster

== Schedule and results ==
Date time, TV	Rank^{#}	Opponent^{#}	Result	Record	Site city, state
Regular season
Dec 2, 1957*		Delaware	W 83–38	1–0	The Palestra; Philadelphia, Pennsylvania
Dec 7, 1957*		at Kentucky	L 83–85 ^{3OT}	1–1	Memorial Coliseum; Lexington, Kentucky
Dec 9, 1957*	No. 10	at No. 19 Cincinnati	L 57–80	1–2	Armory Fieldhouse; Cincinnati, Ohio
Dec 14, 1957*	No. 10	at Bucknell	W 75–59	2–2	Davis Gym; Lewisburg, Pennsylvania
Dec 17, 1957*		Texas A&M	W 60–44	3–2	The Palestra; Philadelphia, Pennsylvania
Dec 21, 1957*		Muhlenberg	W 72–54	4–2	The Palestra; Philadelphia, Pennsylvania
Dec 26, 1957*		vs. Pittsburgh; ECAC Holiday Festival	W 76–71	5–2	Madison Square Garden; New York, New York
Dec 28, 1957*		vs. No. 15 Seattle; ECAC Holiday Festival	W 91–73	6–2	Madison Square Garden; New York, New York
Dec 30, 1957*	No. 13	vs. No. 19 California; ECAC Holiday Festival	W 69–59	7–2	Madison Square Garden; New York, New York
NCAA Tournament
Mar 14, 1958*	No. 5	vs. No. 6 Maryland; East Regional semifinal – Sweet Sixteen	W 71–67	25–2	Charlotte Coliseum; Charlotte, North Carolina
Mar 15, 1958*	No. 5	vs. Dartmouth; East Regional final – Elite Eight	W 69–50	26–2	Charlotte Coliseum; Charlotte, North Carolina
Mar 21, 1958*	No. 5	vs. No. 9 Kentucky; National semifinal – Final Four	L 60–61	26–3	Freedom Hall; Louisville, Kentucky
Mar 22, 1958*	No. 5	vs. No. 3 Kansas State; Consolation	W 67–57	27–3	Freedom Hall; Louisville, Kentucky
*Non-conference game. ^{#}Rankings from AP Poll. (#) Tournament seedings in parentheses. E=East. All times are in Eastern Standard Time. Source

== Awards and honors ==
- Guy Rodgers – Consensus First-team All-American

== Team players drafted into the NBA ==
Round	Pick	Player	NBA club
T	–	Guy Rodgers	Philadelphia Warriors
