= Al Hairston =

American basketball player and coach

Personal information
- Born: December 11, 1945 (age 80)
- Listed height: 6 ft 1 in (1.85 m)
- Listed weight: 170 lb (77 kg)

Career information
- High school: Mount Clemens (Mount Clemens, Michigan)
- College: Bowling Green (1965–1968)
- NBA draft: 1968: 5th round, 52nd overall pick
- Drafted by: Seattle SuperSonics
- Position: Point guard
- Number: 25

Career history
- 1968–1970: Seattle SuperSonics
- Stats at NBA.com
- Stats at Basketball Reference

Alan Leroy Hairston (born December 11, 1945) is an American former professional basketball player and a college and high school head coach. His high school coaching career has garnered him multiple league, district and state championships, as well as numerous individual awards..

A 6-foot-1-inch (1.85 m) guard from Bowling Green State University, Hairston was selected by the Seattle SuperSonics in the fifth round of the 1968 NBA draft and by the Kentucky Colonels in the 1968 ABA draft. Hairston appeared in two seasons for the Sonics, averaging 2.2 points per game.

After a stint with the NBA Cleveland Cavaliers in 1970–71, Hairston was released. He went into coaching, serving as head coach at Seattle Central College (formerly Seattle Central Community College) 1975–79. He led the team to the Northwest championship in 1977.

Hairston has made a contributions to the sport of basketball as a prep coach at Garfield High School in Seattle, Washington. In assuming the O'Dea post, he took over for the late Phil Lumpkin – also a former NBA basketball player and prep coaching star..

Hairston later served as head coach of the Seattle University men's basketball team (which competed as a member of the National Association of Intercollegiate Athletics – NAIA) and as assistant coach of the University of Washington Husky men's basketball team under former head coach Bob Bender..

As an assistant Huskies coach during the 1997–98 season, Hairston helped guide a team led by future NBA player Todd McCullough and Donald Watts Jr. (son of former Seattle Sonic Slick Watts) to the NCAA Sweet 16. There, the Washington Huskies lost to a Jim Calhoun coached University of Connecticut team on a buzzer-beater by future NBA star Richard "Rip" Hamilton..

== Career statistics ==
Legend
GP	Games played	GS	Games started	MPG	Minutes per game
FG%	Field goal percentage	3P%	3-point field goal percentage	FT%	Free throw percentage
RPG	Rebounds per game	APG	Assists per game	SPG	Steals per game
BPG	Blocks per game	PPG	Points per game	**Bold**	Career high

=== NBA ===
==== Regular season ====
Year	Team	GP	MPG	FG%	FT%	RPG	APG	PPG
1967–68	Seattle	**39**	**7.0**	.333	.571	.9	1.0	2.2
1968–69	Seattle	3	6.7	**.375**	**1.000**	**1.7**	**2.0**	**2.3**
Career		42	7.0	.336	.600	1.0	1.0	2.2
