= Bannerwood Park =

Baseball park in Bellevue, Washington, US

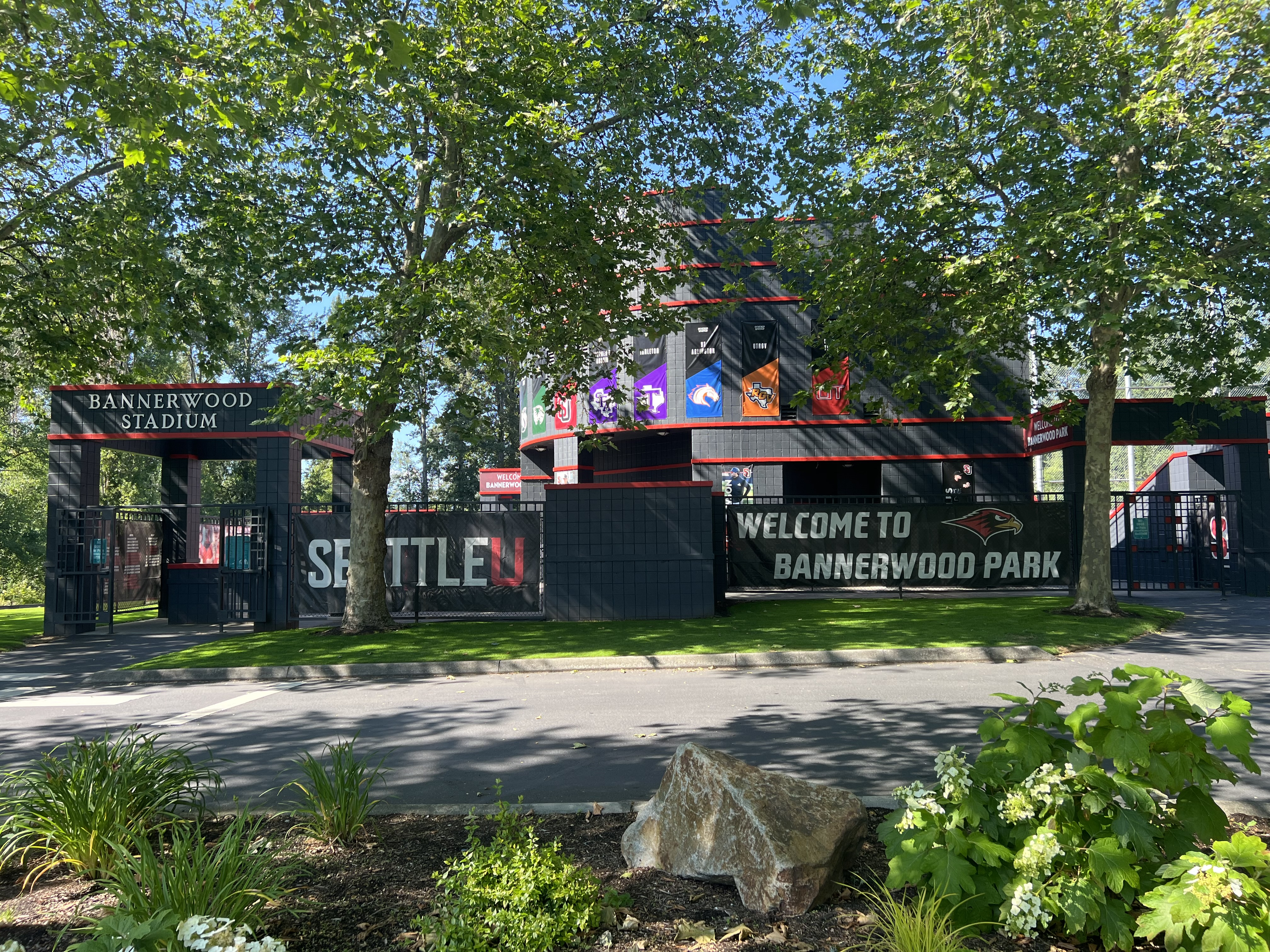
- Entrance from south in 2024

- Location in the United States Location in Washington
- Interactive map of Bannerwood Park
- Address: 1790 Richards Road
- Location: Bellevue, Washington, U.S.
- Coordinates: 47.596°N 122.163°W
- Elevation: 60 feet (18 m) AMSL
- Owner: City of Bellevue
- Operator: City of Bellevue
- Capacity: 300+
- Surface: FieldTurf (infield); Natural grass (outfield)
- Scoreboard: Electronic
- Field size: Left Field: 325 ft (99 m); Left-Center Field: 402 ft (123 m); Center Field: 395 ft (120 m); Right-Center Field: 402 ft (123 m); Right Field: 325 ft (99 m)
- Acreage: 12.65 acres (5.1 ha)

Tenants
- Seattle U. Redhawks (NCAA DI WCC) (2010–present)

Bannerwood Park is a baseball park in the northwest United States, located in Bellevue, Washington, a suburb east of Seattle. It is the home field of Seattle University, a member of the NCAA Division I West Coast Conference. The venue features lighting, bleacher seating, concessions, and restrooms.

On February 23, 2010, Bannerwood Park hosted Seattle's first home game since returning to Division I; the Redhawks lost 21–7 to Division II Saint Martin's of Lacey.

== Usage ==
In addition to Seattle U home games, Bannerwood Park also hosts numerous high school baseball games, including the KingCo Conference 3A tournament.

== Seating ==
There are three sets of bleachers at the park; behind home plate is the largest, seating 200 people. On the sides by the dugouts are smaller bleachers that seat fifty each.

The official seating capacity of Bannerwood Park is 300, but there is abundant room to stand and watch or sit in your own folding chair down the foul lines into the outfield.

== See also ==
- List of NCAA Division I baseball venues
