= Johnny Cox =

American basketball player (born 1936)

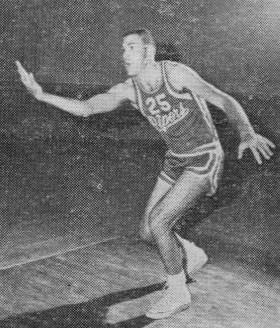

Personal information
- Born: November 1, 1936 (age 90) Neon, Kentucky, U.S.
- Listed height: 6 ft 4 in (1.93 m)
- Listed weight: 180 lb (82 kg)

Career information
- High school: Hazard (Hazard, Kentucky)
- College: Kentucky (1956–1959)
- NBA draft: 1959: 4th round, 28th overall pick
- Drafted by: New York Knicks
- Playing career: 1960–1963
- Position: Shooting guard
- Number: 25

Career history
- 1960: Cleveland Pipers
- 1961: Akron Goodyear Wingfoots
- 1961–1962: Cleveland Pipers
- 1962–1963: Chicago Zephyrs
- 1963–1964: Battle Creek Warriors
- 1964–1965: Muskegon Panthers

Career highlights
- All-ABL Second Team (1962); NCAA champion (1958); Consensus first-team All-American (1959); 2× First-team All-SEC (1957, 1959); Second-team All-SEC (1958)

Career NBA statistics
- Points: 573 (7.8 ppg)
- Rebounds: 280 (3.8 rpg)
- Assists: 142 (1.9 apg)
- Stats at NBA.com
- Stats at Basketball Reference

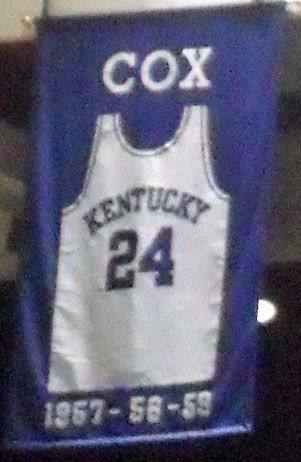
A jersey honoring Cox hangs in Rupp Arena

Johnny W. Cox (born November 1, 1936) is an American former basketball player who played briefly in the National Basketball Association (NBA) after an All-American college basketball career for the Kentucky Wildcats.

A 6'4" shooting guard from Hazard High School in Kentucky, won a state championship in 1955 at Hazard. Cox starred at the University of Kentucky from 1956 to 1959. He scored 1,461 points in 84 career games and won an NCAA championship in 1958. His #24 jersey was later retired by the university.

Cox played one season (1962–63) in the NBA as a member of the Chicago Zephyrs. He averaged 7.8 points per game in 73 games. He also played in the American Basketball League.

== Career statistics ==
Legend
GP	Games played	GS	Games started	MPG	Minutes per game
FG%	Field goal percentage	3P%	3-point field goal percentage	FT%	Free throw percentage
RPG	Rebounds per game	APG	Assists per game	SPG	Steals per game
BPG	Blocks per game	PPG	Points per game	**Bold**	Career high

=== NBA ===
==== Regular season ====
Year	Team	GP	MPG	FG%	FT%	RPG	APG	PPG
1962–63	Chicago	73	23.1	.421	.704	3.8	1.9	7.8
