= 1957–58 Kentucky Wildcats men's basketball team =

1957–58 season of University of Kentucky men's basketball team

1957–58 Kentucky Wildcats men's basketball
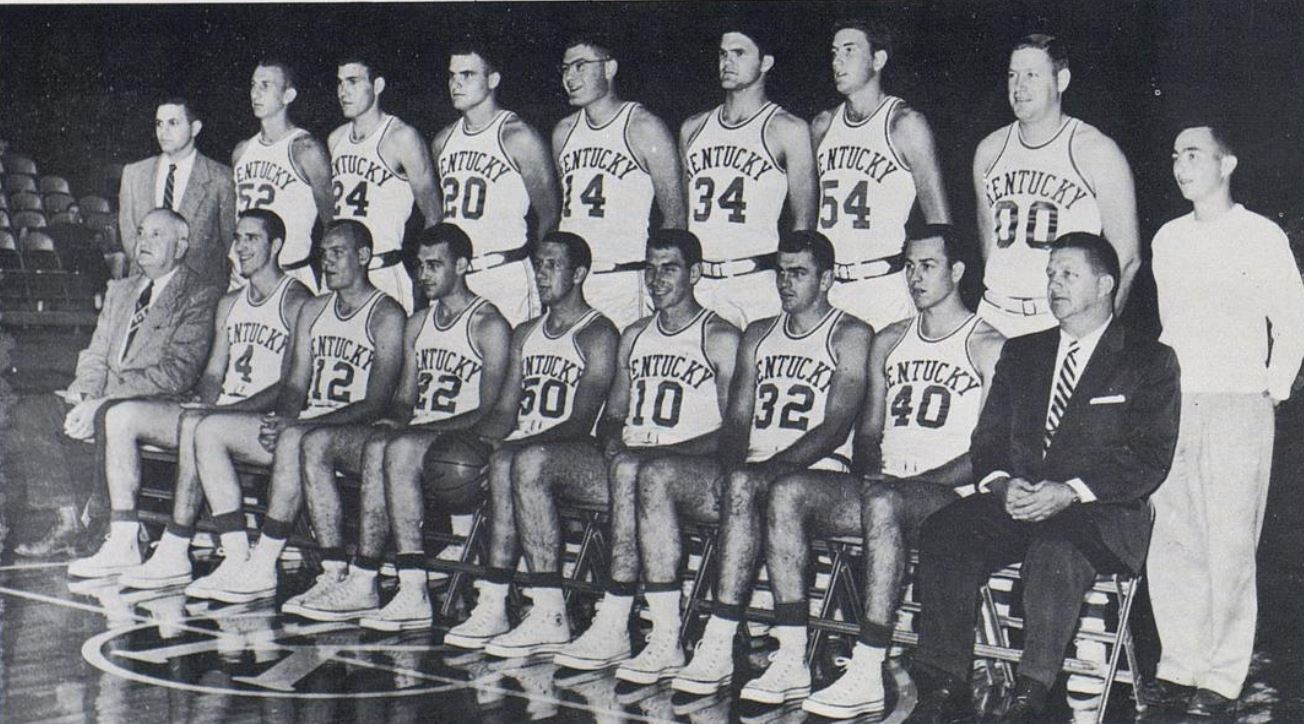

NCAA tournament National champions SEC regular season champions

National Championship Game, W 82–74 vs. Seattle
- Conference: Southeast Conference

Ranking
- Coaches: No. 14
- AP: No. 9
- Record: 23–6 (12–2 SEC)
- Head coach: Adolph Rupp
- Assistant coach: Harry Lancaster
- Captain: Ed Beck
- Home arena: Memorial Coliseum

1957–58 Southeastern Conference men's basketball standings
	Conf.				Overall
Team	W		L	PCT	W		L	PCT
No. 9 Kentucky	12	–	2	.857	23	–	6	.793
No. 16 Auburn	11	–	3	.786	16	–	6	.727
No. 15 Mississippi State	9	–	5	.643	20	–	5	.800
Alabama	9	–	5	.643	17	–	9	.654
Tennessee	8	–	6	.571	16	–	7	.696
Georgia Tech	8	–	6	.571	15	–	11	.577
Vanderbilt	7	–	7	.500	14	–	11	.560
Ole Miss	6	–	8	.429	12	–	12	.500
Florida	5	–	9	.357	12	–	9	.571
Tulane	3	–	11	.214	8	–	15	.348
LSU	3	–	11	.214	7	–	18	.280
Georgia	3	–	11	.214	7	–	19	.269
Rankings from AP Poll

The 1957–58 Kentucky Wildcats men's basketball team represented University of Kentucky. The head coach was Adolph Rupp. The team was a member of the Southeast Conference and played their home games at Memorial Coliseum. This squad was often nicknamed the "Fiddlin' Five". The team finished with an overall record of 23–6 (12–2 SEC). Kentucky advanced to the Final Four of the 1958 NCAA Tournament. In the semifinals they beat Temple and won their 4th National Championship with an 84–72 victory over Seattle.

== Roster ==
1957–58 Kentucky Wildcats men's basketball team
Players
Coaches

Pos.	#	Name	Height	Weight	Year	Previous school	Hometown
G	40	Earl Adkins	6 ft 4 in (1.93 m)	180 lb (82 kg)	Sr	—	Ashland, KY
C	34	Ed Beck (C)	6 ft 7 in (2.01 m)	188 lb (85 kg)	Sr	—	Fort Valley, GA
G/F	12	Billy Ray Cassady	6 ft 2 in (1.88 m)	191 lb (87 kg)	Sr	—	Inez, KY
G	10	Lincoln Collinsworth	6 ft 3 in (1.91 m)	185 lb (84 kg)	Sr	—	Salyersville, KY
F	24	Johnny Cox	6 ft 4 in (1.93 m)	185 lb (84 kg)	Jr	Hazard	Hazard, KY
F	32	John Crigler	6 ft 3 in (1.91 m)	180 lb (82 kg)	Sr	Hebron	Hebron, KY
G	52	Vernon Hatton	6 ft 3 in (1.91 m)	195 lb (88 kg)	Sr	Lafayette	Lexington, KY
F/C	20	Dick Howe	6 ft 5 in (1.96 m)	210 lb (95 kg)	Jr	—	Carbondale, IL
G	10	Lowell Hughes	6 ft 0 in (1.83 m)	175 lb (79 kg)	So	—	Prestonburg, KY
F/C	14	Phil Johnson	6 ft 5 in (1.96 m)	190 lb (86 kg)	Jr	University	Lexington, KY
C	54	Don Mills	6 ft 6 in (1.98 m)	185 lb (84 kg)	So	Berea	Berea, KY
G/F	33	Harold Ross	6 ft 3 in (1.91 m)	175 lb (79 kg)	Sr	—	Hickman, KY
G	50	Adrian Smith	6 ft 0 in (1.83 m)	178 lb (81 kg)	Sr	—	Farmington, KY
F	88	Bill Smith	6 ft 5 in (1.96 m)	200 lb (91 kg)	Sr	—	Walton, KY

Head coach

- Adolph Rupp

Assistant coach(es)

- Harry Lancaster

Legend

- (C) Team captain
- (S) Suspended
- (I) Ineligible
- (W) Walk-on
- Injured
- Current redshirt

Roster
Last update: 2016-Jan-22

== Schedule and results ==
Date time, TV	Rank^{#}	Opponent^{#}	Result	Record	Site (attendance) city, state
December 2*		Duke	W 78–74	1–0	Memorial Coliseum; Lexington, KY
December 4*		at Ohio State	W 61–54	2–0	Ohio Expo Center Coliseum; Columbus, OH
December 7*		Temple	W 85–83 ^{3OT}	3–0	Memorial Coliseum; Lexington, KY
December 9*		at Maryland	L 62–71	3–1	Cole Field House; College Park, MD
December 14*	No. 3	at No. 9 St. Louis	W 73–60	4–1	Kiel Auditorium; St. Louis, MO
December 16*	No. 3	at SMU	L 64–65	4–2	Moody Coliseum; University Park, TX
December 20*	No. 5	No. 8 West Virginia; UK Invitation Tournament	L 70–77	4–3	Memorial Coliseum; Lexington, KY
December 21*	No. 5	No. 10 Minnesota; UK Invitation Tournament	W 78–58	5–3	Memorial Coliseum; Lexington, KY
December 23*	No. 5	Utah St	W 92–64	6–3	Memorial Coliseum; Lexington, KY
December 30*	No. 9	Loyola-Chicago	W 75–42	7–3	Memorial Coliseum; Lexington, KY
January 4	No. 10	Georgia Tech	W 76–60	8–3 (1–0)	Memorial Coliseum; Lexington, KY
January 6	No. 10	at Vanderbilt	W 86–81	9–3 (2–0)	Memorial Gymnasium; Nashville, TN
January 11	No. 9	LSU	W 97–52	10–3 (3–0)	Memorial Coliseum; Lexington, KY
January 13	No. 9	Tulane	W 86–50	11–3 (4–0)	Memorial Coliseum; Lexington, KY
January 18	No. 9	No. 13 Tennessee	W 77–68	12–3 (5–0)	Memorial Coliseum; Lexington, KY
January 27	No. 9	at Georgia Tech	L 52–71	12–4 (5–1)	Alexander Memorial Coliseum; Atlanta, GA
January 29	No. 8	at Georgia	W 74–55	13–4 (6–1)	Alexander Memorial Coliseum; Atlanta, GA
January 31	No. 8	at Florida	W 78–56	14–4 (7–1)	Florida Gymnasium (7,000); Gainesville, FL
February 8	No. 12	Ole Miss	W 96–65	15–4 (8–1)	Memorial Coliseum; Lexington, KY
February 10	No. 12	No. 17 Mississippi St	W 72–62	16–4 (9–1)	Memorial Coliseum; Lexington, KY
February 15*	No. 12	at Loyola-Chicago	L 56–57	16–5	Alumni Gym; Chicago, IL
February 17	No. 12	Vanderbilt	W 65–61	17–5 (10–1)	Memorial Coliseum; Lexington, KY
February 22	No. 13	at Alabama	W 45–43 ^{OT}	18–5 (11–1)	Garrett Coliseum; Montgomery, AL
February 24	No. 13	at Auburn	L 63–64	18–6 (11–2)	Municipal Auditorium; Birmingham, AL
March 1	No. 12	at Tennessee	W 77–66	19–6 (12–2)	Alumni Memorial Gym; Knoxville, TN
March 14*	No. 9	vs. Miami (OH); NCAA tournament	W 94–70	20–6	Memorial Coliseum; Lexington, KY
March 15*	No. 9	vs. No. 8 Notre Dame; NCAA Tournament	W 89–56	21–6	Memorial Coliseum; Lexington, KY
March 21*	No. 9	vs. No. 5 Temple; National Semifinal – Final Four	W 61–60	22–6	Freedom Hall; Louisville, KY
March 22*	No. 9	vs. No. 18 Seattle; National Championship Game	W 84–72	23–6	Freedom Hall; Louisville, KY
*Non-conference game. ^{#}Rankings from AP Poll. (#) Tournament seedings in parentheses. ME=Mideast.

== NCAA Championship ==
The 1958 NCAA Championship game was played in Louisville, Kentucky, before a then NCAA finals record crowd of 18,803, at the newly completed Freedom Hall. Seattle was Kentucky's opponent, led by the great Elgin Baylor. Baylor, a Consensus First Team All-American, was the nation's second-leading scorer (32.5) behind Cincinnati's Oscar Robertson (35.1).

The Chieftains led Kentucky by 11 points in the first half on two occasions. In fact, Seattle was still leading by a score of 60–58 with seven minutes to go in the game. However, led by the sharp shooting of Vernon Hatton and Johnny Cox, Kentucky mounted a strong rally at the end, eventually winning the game by a final score of 84–72. Hatton led Kentucky with 30 points, Cox followed him with 24 points for the Wildcats, while Seattle was led by Baylor, who scored 25 points before fouling out. The victory sealed Kentucky's 4th NCAA Championship.

== Statistics ==
- Vernon Hatton 17.1 ppg
- Johnny Cox 14.9 ppg
- John Crigler 13.6 ppg
- Adrian Smith 12.4 ppg
- Ed Beck 5.6 ppg

== Awards and honors ==
Johnny Cox

- All-SEC (1st Team – Coaches, 2nd Team – AP)
- All-NCAA Regional Team
- All-NCAA Final Four Team

John Crigler

- All-SEC (3rd Team – AP)

Adrian Smith

- All-American (1st Team – Converse, Helms)
- All-SEC (1st Team – Coaches, 2nd Team – AP)
- All-NCAA Regional Team
- All-NCAA Final Four Team

== Team players drafted into the NBA ==
Round	Pick	Player	NBA Club
2	10	Vernon Hatton	Cincinnati Royals
3	28	Johnny Cox	New York Knicks
15	85	Adrian Smith	Cincinnati Royals
