= 1957–58 Seattle Chieftains men's basketball team =

American college basketball season

1957–58 Seattle Chieftains men's basketball

NCAA tournament, runner-up

National Championship Game, L 72–84 vs. Kentucky
- Conference: Independent

Ranking
- Coaches: No. 19
- AP: No. 18
- Record: 23–6
- Head coach: John Castellani (2nd season)

The 1957–58 Seattle Chieftains men's basketball team (now known as Redhawks) represented Seattle University during the 1957–58 NCAA University Division men's basketball season. Led by future top draft pick Elgin Baylor, Seattle was the runner-up in the NCAA tournament, falling to Kentucky in the finals in Louisville, Kentucky.

== Roster ==
1957–58 Seattle Chieftains men's basketball team
Players
Coaches

Pos.	#	Name	Height	Weight	Year	Hometown
F/C	22	Elgin Baylor	6 ft 5 in (1.96 m)	215 lb (98 kg)	Jr	Washington, D.C.
F	24	Don Ogorek	6 ft 5 in (1.96 m)	—	So
G		Don Piasecki	6 ft 2 in (1.88 m)	—	So

Head coach

- John Castellani (Notre Dame)

Assistant coach(es)

Legend

- (C) Team captain
- (S) Suspended
- (I) Ineligible
- (W) Walk-on
- Injured
- Current redshirt

== Schedule and results ==
Date time, TV	Rank^{#}	Opponent^{#}	Result	Record	Site city, state
Regular season
1957*		Portland State	W 104–54	1–0	Seattle, Washington
Dec 12, 1957*		at Oregon State	L 55–63	1–1	Gill Coliseum; Corvallis, Oregon
Dec 14, 1957*		at No. 4 Bradley	W 82–76	2–1	Robertson Memorial Field House; Peoria, Illinois
Dec 20, 1957*	No. 12	vs. No. 7 San Francisco; Bluegrass Festival	L 51–60	2–2	Freedom Hall; Louisville, Kentucky
Dec 21, 1957*	No. 12	vs. Army; Bluegrass Festival	W 80–51	3–2	Freedom Hall; Louisville, Kentucky
Dec 26, 1957*	No. 15	vs. Connecticut; ECAC Holiday Festival	W 87–83	4–2	Madison Square Garden; New York, New York
Dec 28, 1957*	No. 15	vs. Temple; ECAC Holiday Festival	L 73–91	4–3	Madison Square Garden; New York, New York
Dec 30, 1957*	No. 15	vs. Dayton; ECAC Holiday Festival	L 75–81	4–4	Madison Square Garden; New York, New York
January 11, 1958*		at Portland	W 77–47	5–4	Howard Hall; Portland, Oregon
January 12, 1958*		at Portland	W 97–75	6–4	Howard Hall; Portland, Oregon
January 15, 1958*		Montana State	W 108–83	7–4	Seattle, Washington
January 19, 1958*		at Gonzaga	W 90–69	8–4	Spokane Coliseum; Spokane, Washington
January 20, 1958*		at Gonzaga	W 75–53	9–4	Spokane Coliseum; Spokane, Washington
January 27, 1958*		Santa Clara	W 75–67	10–4	Seattle, Washington
January 30, 1958*		Portland	W 94–91	11–4	Seattle, Washington
January 31, 1958*		Portland	W 84–80	12–4	
February 7, 1958*		Gonzaga	W 83–67	13–4	Seattle, Washington
February 8, 1958*		Gonzaga	W 107–71	14–4	
February, 1958*		at Regis	W 99–69	15–4	Everett, Washington
February 20, 1958*		at Montana State	W 78–77	16–4	Brick Breeden Fieldhouse; Bozeman, Montana
February, 1958*		at Idaho State	L 68–71 ^{OT}	16–5	Reed Gym; Pocatello, Idaho
1958*		Pacific Lutheran	W 94–60	17–5	Seattle, Washington
1958*		Idaho State	W 73–60	18–5	Seattle, Washington
March 10, 1958*	No. 18	No. 14 Bradley	W 80–74	19–5	Seattle, Washington
NCAA tournament
Mar 12, 1958*	No. 18	vs. Wyoming; West Regional quarterfinal	W 88–51	20–5	Harmon Gym; Berkeley, California
Mar 14, 1958*	No. 18	vs. No. 4 San Francisco; West Regional semifinal	W 69–67	21–5	Cow Palace (16,382); Daly City, California
Mar 15, 1958*	No. 18	vs. California; West Regional final	W 66–62 ^{OT}	22–5	Cow Palace; Daly City, California
Mar 21, 1958*	No. 18	vs. No. 3 Kansas State; National semifinal – Final Four	W 73–51	23–5	Freedom Hall (18,586); Louisville, Kentucky
Mar 22, 1958*	No. 18	vs. No. 9 Kentucky; National Championship Game	L 72–84	23–6	Freedom Hall (18,803); Louisville, Kentucky
*Non-conference game. ^{#}Rankings from AP Poll. (#) Tournament seedings in parentheses. W=West. All times are in Pacific Time.

== NCAA tournament ==
- West
  - Seattle 69, San Francisco 67
  - Seattle 66, California 62
- Final Four
  - Seattle 73, Kansas State 51
  - Kentucky 84, Seattle 72

=== NCAA Championship ===
The NCAA Final Four was played at Freedom Hall in Louisville, Kentucky. Seattle had an integrated team, and played in front of an all-white crowd of 18,803. Elgin Baylor was the nation's second-best scorer (32.5) behind Cincinnati's Oscar Robertson. The Chieftains led Kentucky by 11 points in the first half, and were leading 60–58, with seven minutes in the game. Seattle lost the game 84–72, for a 23–6 season.

After the championship game, Baylor hinted that he might return for his senior season. Castellani had two recruits with him from the South Bend area, forwards Don Piasecki and Don Ogorek. The Chieftains also added a transfer from Indiana, guard Charlie Brown. The feeling was that the team would have a bright future.

== Awards and honors ==
- Elgin Baylor – NCAA Men's MOP Award, Helms Foundation College Basketball Player of the Year, Consensus First-team All-American

== Team players drafted into the NBA ==
Round	Pick	Player	NBA club
1	1	Elgin Baylor	Minneapolis Lakers
