= Adolph Rupp =

American college basketball coach (1901–1977)

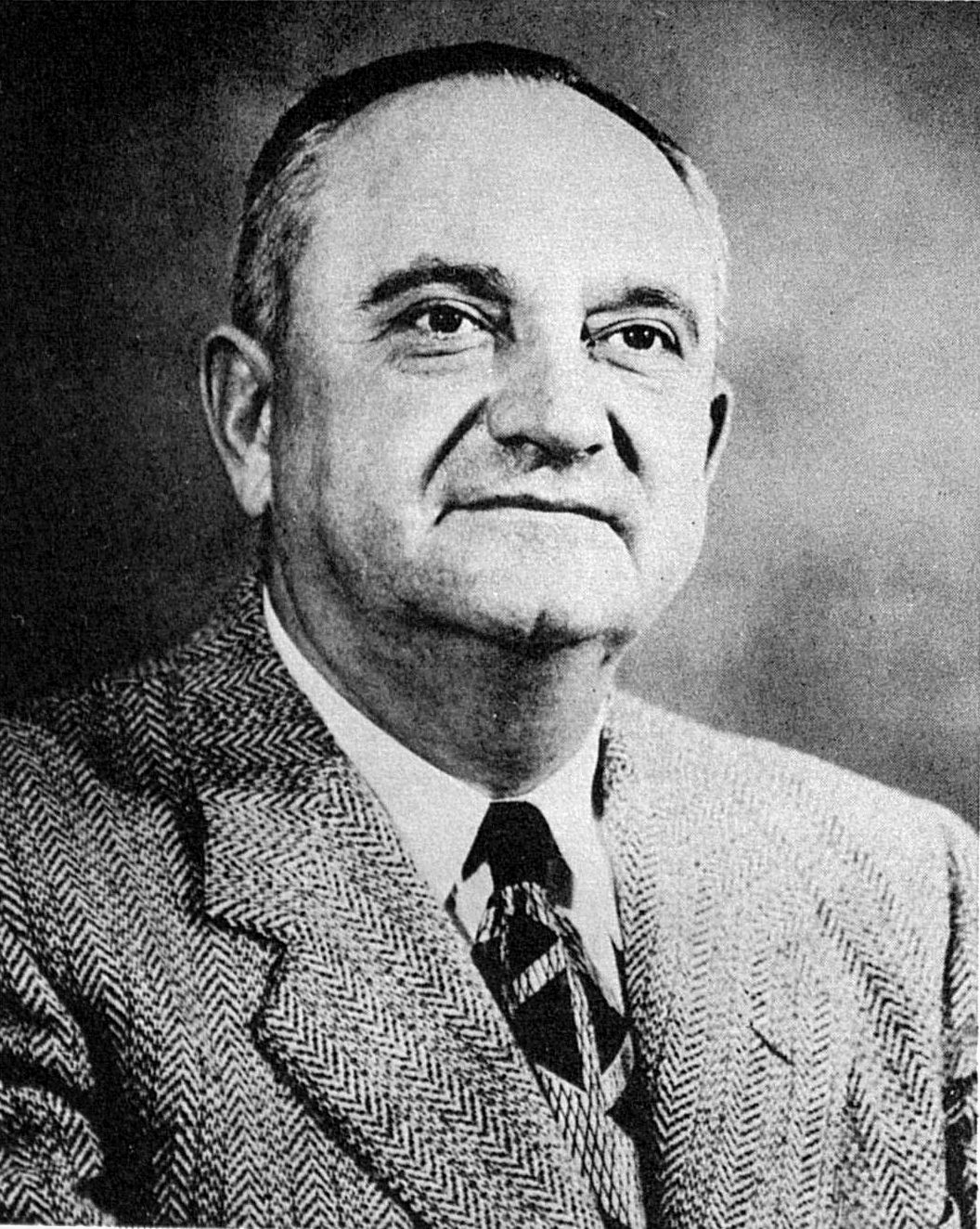
- Rupp in 1954

Biographical details
- Born: September 2, 1901; Halstead, Kansas, U.S.
- Died: December 10, 1977 (aged 76); Lexington, Kentucky, U.S.

Playing career
- 1920–1923: Kansas

Coaching career (HC unless noted)
- 1926–1930: Freeport HS
- 1930–1972: Kentucky

Head coaching record
- Overall: 876–190 (.822) (college)

Accomplishments and honors

Championships
- As a coach: 4 NCAA tournament (1948, 1949, 1951, 1958); 6 NCAA regional—Final Four (1942, 1948, 1949, 1951, 1958, 1966); NIT (1946); SoCon regular season (1932); 13 SEC tournament (1933, 1937, 1939, 1940, 1942, 1944–1950, 1952); 27 SEC regular season (1933, 1935, 1937, 1939, 1940, 1942, 1944–1952, 1954, 1955, 1957, 1958, 1962, 1964, 1966, 1968–1972); As a player: 2 Helms National (1922, 1923)

Awards
- 5× National Coach of the Year (1950, 1954, 1959, 1966, 1970); 7× SEC Coach of the Year (1964, 1966, 1968–1972)
- Basketball Hall of Fame; Inducted in 1969 (profile)
- College Basketball Hall of Fame; Inducted in 2006

Adolph Frederick Rupp (September 2, 1901 – December 10, 1977) was an American college basketball coach. Nicknamed the "Baron of the Bluegrass", he coached the University of Kentucky Wildcats to four NCAA championships, one NIT championship, 27 Southeastern Conference championships, and 13 SEC tournament championships. In his 41 years of coaching at Kentucky, he won 876 games, retiring with the most total victories by a men's NCAA Division I college coach at the time; he has since been surpassed by six coaches and ranks seventh. Rupp is second among all men's college coaches in all-time winning percentage (.822) and third in NCAA championships. In 1948, he coached the US Olympic Team to a gold medal in London.

Rupp was enshrined in the Naismith Memorial Basketball Hall of Fame on April 13, 1969. Rupp played college basketball at Kansas under Phog Allen.

== Early life ==
Rupp was born September 2, 1901, in Halstead, Kansas, to Heinrich Rupp, a German immigrant, and Anna Lichti, a Palatinate (Quirnheim, Germany) immigrant. The fourth of six children, Rupp grew up on a 163-acre farm that his parents had homesteaded. He began playing basketball as a young child, with the help of his mother, who made a ball for him by stuffing rags into a gunnysack. "Mother sewed it up and somehow made it round," he recalled in 1977. "You couldn't dribble it. You couldn't bounce it either."

Rupp was a star for the Halstead High School basketball team, one of the first in the area to play with a real basketball. He averaged 19 points a game. Former teammates described Rupp as the team's unofficial coach.

After high school, Rupp attended the University of Kansas from 1919 to 1923. He worked part-time at the student Jayhawk Cafe to help pay his college expenses. In 1922, Adolph pledged and was initiated into the Iota chapter of International Fraternity of Delta Sigma Pi. Later in 1966, he was named Deltasig of the Year by the fraternity. He was a reserve on the basketball team under Hall of Fame coach Phog Allen from 1919 to 1923. Assisting Allen during that time was his former coach and inventor of the game of basketball, James Naismith, whom Rupp also got to know well during his time in Lawrence.

In Rupp's junior and senior college seasons (1921–22 and 1922–23), Kansas (KU) had outstanding basketball squads. Later, both of these standout Kansas teams would be awarded the Helms National Championship, recognizing the Jayhawks as the top team in the nation during those seasons.

He received an MA from Teachers College, Columbia University.

== Coaching career ==
=== High school ===
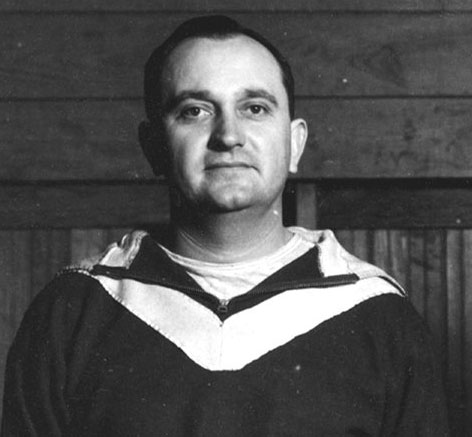
Rupp in 1930

Rupp began his career in coaching by accepting a teaching job at Burr Oak High School, Kansas. After a one-year stay, Rupp moved on to Marshalltown, Iowa, where he coached wrestling, a sport he knew nothing about at the time and learned from a book. He led the Marshalltown team to a state wrestling title in 1926.

In 1926–30, Rupp accepted the basketball head coaching position at Freeport High School, (Freeport, Illinois) where he also taught history and economics. During his four years at Freeport, Rupp compiled a record of 66–21 and guided his team to a third-place finish in the 1929 state tournament. While at Freeport High School Rupp started William "Mose" Mosely, the first African-American to play basketball at Freeport and the second to graduate from the school.

University of Illinois head basketball coach Craig Ruby was invited to speak at the team banquet following the 1929–30 season. Ruby informed Rupp of the Kentucky head coaching job and followed up by recommending him for the job.

During his time in Freeport, Rupp met his future wife, Esther Schmidt.

=== Kentucky ===
Rupp coached the University of Kentucky men's basketball team from 1930 to 1972. There, he gained the nicknames, "Baron of the Bluegrass", and "The Man in the Brown Suit". Rupp was inducted into Omicron Delta Kappa at Kentucky in 1937. Rupp's Wildcat teams won four NCAA championships (1948, 1949, 1951, 1958), one National Invitation Tournament title in 1946, appeared in 20 NCAA tournaments, had six NCAA Final Four appearances, captured 27 Southeastern Conference regular season titles, and won 13 Southeastern Conference tournaments. Rupp's Kentucky teams also finished ranked #1 on six occasions in the final Associated Press college basketball poll and four times in the United Press International (Coaches) poll. In addition, Rupp's 1966 Kentucky squad—nicknamed "Rupp's Runts"— finished runner-up in the NCAA tournament and Rupp's 1947 Wildcats finished runner-up in the National Invitation Tournament. Rupp's 1933 and 1954 Kentucky squads were also retroactively named national champions by the Helms Athletic Foundation; his 1934, 1947, and 1948 teams were retroactively listed as the top-ranked teams for those respective seasons by the Premo-Porretta Power Poll.

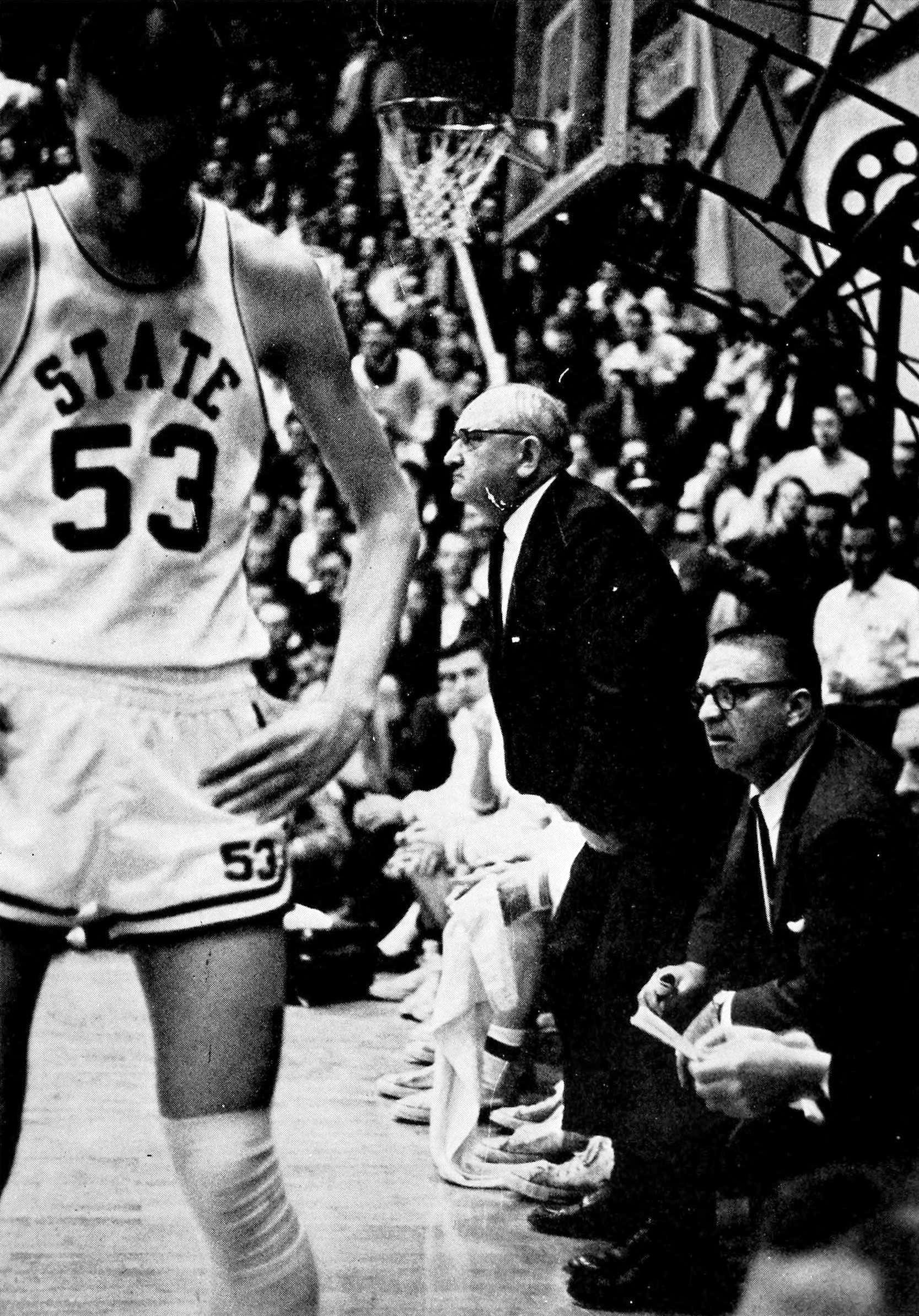
Rupp coaching in 1963

In his 41 seasons as UK coach, Rupp coached 32 All-Americans, chosen 50 times, 52 All-SEC players, chosen 91 times, 44 NBA Draft Picks, 2 National Players-of-the-Year, 7 Olympic Gold Medalists, and 4 Naismith Memorial Basketball Hall of Fame members. He was a 5-time National Coach-of-the-Year award winner, and a 7-time Conference Coach-of-the-Year award winner. Rupp was inducted into the Naismith Memorial Basketball Hall of Fame, College Basketball Hall of Fame, Kentucky Athletic Hall of Fame, Kansas Athletic Hall of Fame, University of Kentucky Athletic Hall of Fame, and Helms Athletic Foundation Hall of Fame. Further, since 1972, the Adolph Rupp Trophy, considered one of the nation's premier basketball awards, has been given by the Commonwealth Athletic Club to the top men's college basketball player. In addition, the University of Kentucky retired a jersey in his honor in the rafters of Rupp Arena, a 23,500-seat arena named after him, dedicated in 1976.

Rupp was forced into retirement in March 1972, at the age of 70. At the time, this was the mandatory retirement age for all University of Kentucky employees.

=== 1951 point shaving scandal ===
Rupp was the head coach at Kentucky during the point shaving scandal of 1951. On October 20, 1951, former Kentucky players Alex Groza, Bill Spivey, Ralph Beard, and Dale Barnstable were arrested for taking bribes from gamblers to shave points during the National Invitation Tournament game against the Loyola Ramblers in the 1948–49 season. This game occurred during the same year that Kentucky won their second straight NCAA title under Rupp. Rupp and the university were criticized by the presiding judge, Saul Streit, for creating an atmosphere for the violations to occur and for "failing in his duty to observe the amateur rules, to build character, and to protect the morals and health of his charges". Rupp denied any knowledge of the point shaving and no evidence was ever brought against him to show he was connected to the incident in any way.

A subsequent NCAA investigation found that Kentucky had committed several rule violations, including giving illegal spending money to players on several occasions, and also allowing some ineligible athletes to compete. As a result, the Southeastern Conference voted to ban Kentucky from competing for a year and the NCAA requested all other basketball-playing members not to schedule Kentucky, with eventually none doing so. Because of these actions, Kentucky was forced to cancel the entire 1952–53 basketball season. Years later, Walter Byers, the first executive director of the NCAA, unofficially referred to this punishment as the first de facto NCAA death penalty, despite the current rule only coming into effect in 1985. The NCAA's website similarly stated "In effect, it was the Association's first "death penalty," though its enforcement was binding only through constitutional language that required members to compete against only those schools that were compliant with NCAA rules. Despite fears that it would resist, Kentucky accepted the penalty ..."

=== 1966 championship game against Texas Western ===
A pivotal game in Rupp's career and for college basketball in general was the 1966 NCAA championship game at Cole Field House against Texas Western, coached by Don Haskins. It featured Kentucky's all-white team against Texas Western's all-black starting five, and took place at the height of the Civil Rights Movement. The game, which Texas Western won 72–65, helped accelerate the ongoing integration movement in college basketball, as well as the overall recruiting approach of the SEC, ACC, and SWC conferences.

=== Coaching style and philosophy ===
Rupp was an early innovator of the fast break and set offense. His offense consisted of 10–15 set plays (with variations for each), complete with extensive offensive movement and screening. Early basketball innovations such as the "guard around" play and inside screen were first developed by Rupp in the 1930s. Likewise, he was an early proponent of the fast break, which his Kentucky teams used at every opportunity throughout his career. For most of his coaching career he preferred only a tight man-to-man defense, but during the 1963–64 season, he became one of the first coaches to begin experimenting with the trapping 1–3–1 zone defense, and his Kentucky teams used this defense at times for the remainder of his career. Throughout his time at Kentucky, Rupp's recruiting focused largely on local and regional talent; over 80% of Rupp's Kentucky players came from the state of Kentucky.

Rupp strongly emphasized the fundamentals of basketball, both on offense and defense, and overall discipline. He believed that excellence was achieved only through repetition, and his practices stressed individual instruction, precision, and continuity. Rupp was very demanding of his players, constantly putting extreme pressure on them in practice, and mercilessly berating them for any mistakes.

=== Superstitions ===
Rupp, a very superstitious man, was known to carry a "lucky" buckeye in his pocket. His favorite sign of good luck was finding a pin, especially a bobby pin, particularly on a game day. The depth of his superstitious nature was revealed while he was coaching at Freeport, when he had bought a new blue suit to replace his old brown one. He wore his new suit to a game, and his team got beaten badly. Rupp never again wore anything but a brown suit to games.

=== Civil rights ===
Rupp hired assistant coach Neil Reed in 1960 to help recruit African-American players and once asked the UK president to leave the SEC so he could recruit black players. Rupp recruited Wes Unseld (the first black player to which Rupp extended a formal scholarship offer) and Butch Beard before both picked Louisville; the amount of effort Rupp put into their recruitments is disputed. Rupp signed his first black player, troubled 7'2" center Tom Payne, who played in the 1971 season. After his lone varsity season, Payne, who was on the verge of flunking out of school, joined the NBA's first-ever supplemental draft. Adolph Rupp's views on racial issues and interest in signing black players remains a subject of dispute, with Rupp denying accusations of racism during his tenure at Kentucky.

== Executive career ==
=== Memphis Tams ===
In April 1972, Rupp was named team president of the Memphis Pros, soon to become the Memphis Tams, of the American Basketball Association. Rupp was used mostly as a figurehead by Finley, who sent him to travel to games and sit by the press table so others could see him. In June 1973 Rupp quit as Tams president, calling the ABA "bush league" and saying it "would never survive". According to Ron Grinker, an attorney for players, Rupp (who had apparently drank several Kentucky bourbons) once stated in conversation that the problem with the league was "that there are too many n----r boys in it now."

=== Kentucky Colonels ===
In September 1973, Rupp was hired as Vice President of the Board of the Kentucky Colonels of the American Basketball Association.

== Death ==
Rupp died of spinal cancer at age 76 in Lexington, Kentucky, on December 10, 1977, on a night when Kentucky defeated his alma mater, Kansas, at Allen Fieldhouse in Lawrence, Kansas. The game that night was promoted as "Adolph Rupp Night". He is buried in Lexington Cemetery. Rupp Arena, the current home of the Kentucky men's basketball team, is named in his honor.

== Head coaching record ==
=== College ===
Record table
Season	Team	Overall	Conference	Standing	Postseason
Kentucky Wildcats (Southern Conference) (1930–1932)
1930–31	Kentucky	15–3	8–2	4th	
1931–32	Kentucky	15–2	9–1	T–1st	
Kentucky:		30–5	17–3		
Kentucky Wildcats (Southeastern Conference) (1932–1972)
1932–33	Kentucky	21–3	8–0	1st	Helms National Champion
1933–34	Kentucky	16–1	11–0	1st	
1934–35	Kentucky	19–2	11–0	T–1st	
1935–36	Kentucky	15–6	6–2	1st	
1936–37	Kentucky	17–5	5–3	T–5th	
1937–38	Kentucky	13–5	6–0	1st	
1938–39	Kentucky	16–4	5–2	3rd	
1939–40	Kentucky	15–6	4–4	6th	
1940–41	Kentucky	17–8	8–1	1st	
1941–42	Kentucky	19–6	6–2	3rd	NCAA Final Four
1942–43	Kentucky	17–6	8–1	1st	
1943–44	Kentucky	19–2			NIT Third Place
1944–45	Kentucky	22–4	4–1	T–1st	NCAA Elite Eight
1945–46	Kentucky	28–2	6–0	T–1st	NIT champion
1946–47	Kentucky	34–3	11–0	1st	NIT Runner-up
1947–48	Kentucky	36–3	9–0	1st	NCAA champion
1948–49	Kentucky	32–2	13–0	1st	NCAA champion, NIT Quarterfinal
1949–50	Kentucky	25–5	11–2	1st	NIT Quarterfinal
1950–51	Kentucky	32–2	14–0	1st	NCAA champion
1951–52	Kentucky	29–3	14–0	1st	NCAA Elite Eight
1952–53	No team*				
1953–54	Kentucky	25–0	15–0**	T–1st	Helms National Champion
1954–55	Kentucky	23–3	12–2	1st	NCAA Sweet 16
1955–56	Kentucky	20–6	12–2	2nd	NCAA Elite Eight
1956–57	Kentucky	23–5	12–2	1st	NCAA University Division Elite Eight
1957–58	Kentucky	23–6	12–2	1st	NCAA University Division champion
1958–59	Kentucky	24–3	12–2	T–2nd	NCAA University Division Sweet 16
1959–60	Kentucky	18–7	10–4	3rd	
1960–61	Kentucky	19–9	11–4**	T–2nd	NCAA University Division Elite Eight
1961–62	Kentucky	23–3	13–1	T–1st	NCAA University Division Elite Eight
1962–63	Kentucky	16–9	8–6	5th	
1963–64	Kentucky	21–6	11–3	1st	NCAA University Division Sweet 16
1964–65	Kentucky	15–10	10–6	5th	
1965–66	Kentucky	27–2	15–1	1st	NCAA University Division Runner-up
1966–67	Kentucky	13–13	8–10	T–5th	
1967–68	Kentucky	22–5	15–3	1st	NCAA University Division Elite Eight
1968–69	Kentucky	23–5	16–2	1st	NCAA University Division Sweet 16
1969–70	Kentucky	26–2	17–1	1st	NCAA University Division Elite 8
1970–71	Kentucky	22–6	16–2	1st	NCAA University Division Sweet 16
1971–72	Kentucky	21–7	14–4	T–1st	NCAA University Division Elite Eight
Kentucky:		876–190	399–75		
Total:		876–190			
National champion Postseason invitational champion Conference regular season champion Conference regular season and conference tournament champion Division regular season champion Division regular season and conference tournament champion Conference tournament champion

- ** Record includes SEC playoff tiebreaker games
- The team did not play in the 1952–53 season because of involvement in a point shaving scandal.

== See also ==
- List of college men's basketball coaches with 600 wins
- List of NCAA Division I Men's Final Four appearances by coach
