= 1958 NCAA University Division basketball tournament =

Edition of USA college basketball tournament

- Season: 1957–58
- Teams: 24
- Finals site: Freedom Hall, Louisville, Kentucky
- Champions: Kentucky Wildcats (4th title, 4th title game, 5th Final Four)
- Runner-up: Seattle Chieftains (1st title game, 1st Final Four)
- Semifinalists: Kansas State Wildcats (3rd Final Four); Temple Owls (2nd Final Four)
- Winning coach: Adolph Rupp (4th title)
- MOP: Elgin Baylor (Seattle)
- Attendance: 176,878
- Top scorer: Elgin Baylor (Seattle) (135 points)

The 1958 NCAA University Division basketball tournament involved 24 schools playing in single-elimination play to determine the national champion of men's NCAA Division I college basketball in the United States. The 20th annual edition of the tournament began on March 11, and ended with the championship game on Saturday, March 22, at Freedom Hall in Louisville, Kentucky. A total of 28 games were played, including a third-place game in each region and a national third-place game.

Led by head coach Adolph Rupp, the Kentucky Wildcats won the national title with an 84–72 victory in the final game over Seattle, coached by John Castellani. The Chieftains led by 39–36 at the half, but star forward Elgin Baylor picked up his fourth personal foul with over sixteen minutes remaining. The Chieftains were outscored by fifteen in the second half, and Baylor was named the tournament's Most Outstanding Player.

== Locations ==
Round	Region	Site	Venue
First round	East	New York, New York	Madison Square Garden
First round	Mideast	Evanston, Illinois	McGaw Memorial Hall
First round	Midwest	Stillwater, Oklahoma	Gallagher Hall
First round	West	Berkeley, California	Men's Gym
Regionals	East	Charlotte, North Carolina	Charlotte Coliseum
Regionals	Mideast	Lexington, Kentucky	Memorial Coliseum
Regionals	Midwest	Lawrence, Kansas	Allen Fieldhouse
Regionals	West	San Francisco, California	Cow Palace
Final Four		Louisville, Kentucky	Freedom Hall

== Teams ==
Region	Team	Coach	Conference	Finished	Final Opponent	Score
East
East	Boston College	Dino Martin	Independent	First round	Maryland	L 86–63
East	Connecticut	Hugh Greer	Yankee	First round	Dartmouth	L 75–64
East	Dartmouth	Doggie Julian	Ivy League	Regional Runner-up	Temple	L 69–50
East	Manhattan	Ken Norton	Metro NY	Regional Fourth Place	Maryland	L 59–55
East	Maryland	Bud Millikan	Atlantic Coast	Regional third place	Manhattan	W 59–55
East	Temple	Harry Litwack	Independent	Third Place	Kansas State	W 67–57
East	West Virginia	Fred Schaus	Southern	First round	Manhattan	L 89–84
Mideast
Mideast	Indiana	Branch McCracken	Big Ten	Regional third place	Miami (OH)	W 98–91
Mideast	Kentucky	Adolph Rupp	Southeastern	Champion	Seattle	W 84–72
Mideast	Miami (OH)	Dick Shrider	Mid-American	Regional Fourth Place	Indiana	L 98–91
Mideast	Notre Dame	John Jordan	Independent	Regional Runner-up	Kentucky	L 89–56
Mideast	Pittsburgh	Bob Timmons	Independent	First round	Miami (OH)	L 82–77
Mideast	Tennessee Tech	Johnny Oldham	Ohio Valley	First round	Notre Dame	L 94–61
Midwest
Midwest	Arkansas	Glen Rose	Southwest	Regional Fourth Place	Cincinnati	L 97–62
Midwest	Cincinnati	George Smith	Missouri Valley	Regional third place	Arkansas	W 97–62
Midwest	Kansas State	Tex Winter	Big 8	Fourth Place	Temple	L 67–57
Midwest	Loyola (LA)	Jim Harding	Independent	First round	Oklahoma State	L 59–42
Midwest	Oklahoma State	Henry Iba	Independent	Regional Runner-up	Kansas State	L 69–57
West
West	Arizona State	Ned Wulk	Border	First round	Idaho State	L 72–68
West	California	Pete Newell	Pacific Coast	Regional Runner-up	Seattle	L 66–62
West	Idaho State	John Grayson	Independent	Regional Fourth Place	San Francisco	L 57–51
West	San Francisco	Phil Woolpert	West Coast Athletic	Regional third place	Idaho State	W 57–51
West	Seattle	John Castellani	Independent	Runner Up	Kentucky	L 84–72
West	Wyoming	Everett Shelton	Mountain States	First round	Seattle	L 88–51

== Bracket ==
* – Denotes overtime period

=== East region ===
Quarterfinals
Maryland	86
Boston College	63
Manhattan	89
West Virginia	84
Dartmouth	75
Connecticut	64

Semifinals
Temple	71
Maryland	67
Manhattan	62
Dartmouth	79

Finals
Temple	69
Dartmouth	50

=== Mideast region ===
Quarterfinals
Miami (OH)	82
Pittsburgh	77
Notre Dame	94
Tennessee Tech	61

Semifinals
Kentucky	94
Miami (OH)	70
Notre Dame	94
Indiana	87

Finals
Kentucky	89
Notre Dame	56

=== Midwest region ===
Quarterfinals
Oklahoma State	59
Loyola (LA)	42

Semifinals
Arkansas	40
Oklahoma State	65
Kansas State	83
Cincinnati	80*

Finals
Oklahoma State	57
Kansas State	69

=== West region ===
Quarterfinals
Seattle	88
Wyoming	51
Idaho State	72
Arizona State	68

Semifinals
San Francisco	67
Seattle	69
Idaho State	43
California	54

Finals
Seattle	66
California	62*

=== Final Four ===
National Semifinals
E	Temple	60
ME	Kentucky	61
MW	Kansas State	51
W	Seattle	73

National Finals
ME	Kentucky	84
W	Seattle	72

=== National third-place game ===
National third-place game
E	Temple	67
MW	Kansas State	57

=== Regional third-place games ===
East Regional third place
Maryland	59
Manhattan	55

Mideast Regional third place
Indiana	98
Miami (OH)	91

Midwest Regional third place
Cincinnati	97
Arkansas	62

West Regional third place
San Francisco	57
Idaho State	51

== See also ==
- 1958 NCAA College Division basketball tournament
- 1958 National Invitation Tournament
- 1958 NAIA basketball tournament
