= Harry Gotkin =

American basketball scout

Harry Gotkin (February 2, 1901 – November 1983) was an American basketball scout who recruited for the North Carolina Tar Heels men's basketball team during the tenure of head coach Frank McGuire. He helped put together the team that won the 1957 NCAA University Division basketball tournament.

== Early life ==
Gotkin was born in Russia, grew up in Lower Manhattan, and resided in Brooklyn for most of his adult life. Although his brother, Dave "Java" Gotkin, and cousin Hy Gotkin, were stars for the St. John's basketball team, he did not poseess the same athletic prowess. He started working at the age of 10 to help his family. For many years, he ran a baby bonnet manufacturing business.

== Recruiting ==
Gotkin was introduced to Frank McGuire by his younger brother, who played with McGuire at St. John's. During their time at the school, McGuire would defend Dave Gotkin from antisemitic remarks. When McGuire became St. John's head coach, Gotkin recruited the school's first ever black player, Solly Walker.

McGuire moved to the University of North Carolina in 1953, but continued to build his team around players from New York City. Gotkin would attend about 300 high school games a year and provide weekly scouting reports to McGuire. He was one of many "street agents" who recruited for out-of-town colleges at this time, including Howard Garfinkel, Walter November, Aldo Leone, Fred "Spook" Stegmann, and Mike Tynberg. Gotkin recruited for exclusively for McGuire because, according to Gotkin, "Frank treats players like they were his own sons. He’s a wonderful man."

On Gotkin's recommendation, McGuire gave a scholarship to Lennie Rosenbluth, who had only played seven high school games. In 1955, he steered Danny Lotz, who was ready to attend Wake Forest, to UNC. In 1957, Rosenbluth, along with fellow Gotkin recruits Pete Brennan, Joe Quigg, Bob Cunningham, Tommy Kearns, and Lotz led North Carolina to a 32–0 season and a triple-overtime victory over Wilt Chamberlain's Kansas Jayhawks in the 1957 NCAA University Division basketball championship game. Gotkin later recruited Doug Moe, York Larese, Lee Shaffer, Billy Cunningham, and Larry Brown for McGuire.

In January 1961, the National Collegiate Athletic Association placed North Carolina on probation for one year. Their investigation found that Gotkin had been reimbursed what appeared to be an excessive amount of money for recruiting expenses without providing itemized bills. Shortly thereafter, the NCAA voted to bar schools from paying recruiters. McGuire resigned as North Carolina's coach at the end of the season.

== Later life ==
Gotkin continued to attend around 300 high school games a year through the 1970s. Although NCAA rules barred him from recruiting players, he would still inform McGuire, then at South Carolina, of any good players he found.

Gotkin spent his later years living on East 42nd Street. A lifelong bachelor, he was found dead in his apartment by relatives in November 1983.
