= 1957 NCAA University Division basketball championship game =

Men's college basketball tournament game

1957 NCAA Tournament Championship Game
National championship game
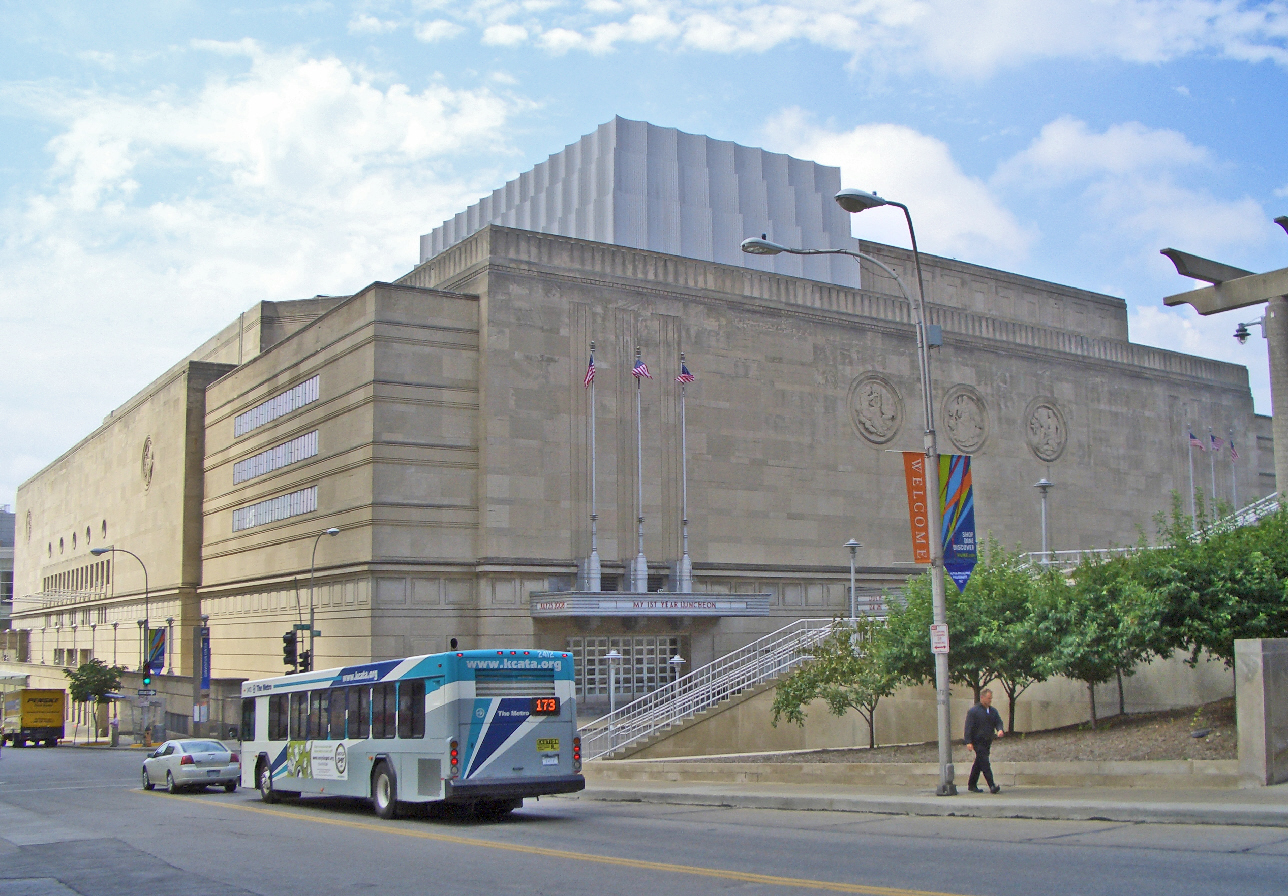
- The Municipal Auditorium in Kansas City, Missouri, hosted the championship game.
North Carolina Tar Heels	Kansas Jayhawks
ACC	Big Seven
(31–0)	(24–2)
54	53
Head coach: Frank McGuire	Head coach: Dick Harp
- AP: 1
- Coaches: 1
- AP: 2
- Coaches: 2
	1st half	2nd half	OT	2OT	3OT	Total
North Carolina Tar Heels	29	17	2	0	6	54
Kansas Jayhawks	22	24	2	0	5	53
- Date: March 23, 1957
- Venue: Municipal Auditorium, Kansas City, Missouri
- MVP: Wilt Chamberlain, Kansas
- Favorite: Kansas by 3
- Referees: Joe Conway & Hagan Anderson
- Attendance: 7,778

The 1957 NCAA University Division Basketball Championship Game took place on March 23, 1957, between the North Carolina Tar Heels and the Kansas Jayhawks at the Municipal Auditorium in Kansas City, Missouri. The matchup was the final one of the nineteenth edition of the single-elimination tournament now known as the NCAA Division I men's basketball tournament—commonly referred to as the NCAA Tournament—organized by the National Collegiate Athletic Association (NCAA). It was used to crown a national men's basketball champion in the NCAA's University Division, known since 1973 as the NCAA Division I.

After winning numerous close games during the regular season, the conference tournament, and a triple-overtime game against Michigan State in the national semifinal, North Carolina came into the national championship game with a record of 31–0. Led by coach Frank McGuire and Helms Foundation College Basketball Player of the Year Lennie Rosenbluth, the Tar Heels were ranked first overall in the AP Poll. Kansas came into the national championship game with two losses, which were credited to poor ball control on the Jayhawks' part. The Jayhawks, led by sophomore phenom and first-team All-American Wilt Chamberlain, were favored to win against the Tar Heels.

The game attracted heavy media attention with over ten television stations and sixty–three news reporters in attendance. The North Carolina Tar Heels jumped out to an early 19–7 lead in the first half until the Jayhawks reduced the Tar Heels' lead to seven points (29–22) at halftime. In the second half, the Jayhawks took the lead. The Tar Heels tied the game in the final minute, sending the game into overtime. In the first overtime, each team scored a basket before time ran out; in the second overtime, no points were scored due to lack of offensive execution by both teams. More action took place in the third overtime. The Tar Heels won the game 54–53 as Joe Quigg made two free throws in the closing seconds to give them their first NCAA Men's Basketball National Championship.

The team received a large welcome at Raleigh–Durham International Airport when they arrived back in North Carolina. Due to the successful televising of the national championship game in North Carolina, the broadcasting of Atlantic Coast Conference collegiate basketball games expanded greatly. Kansas' Chamberlain was criticized for his inability to win the national championship. He eventually left Kansas after his junior year to join the Harlem Globetrotters.

== Background ==
=== North Carolina Tar Heels ===
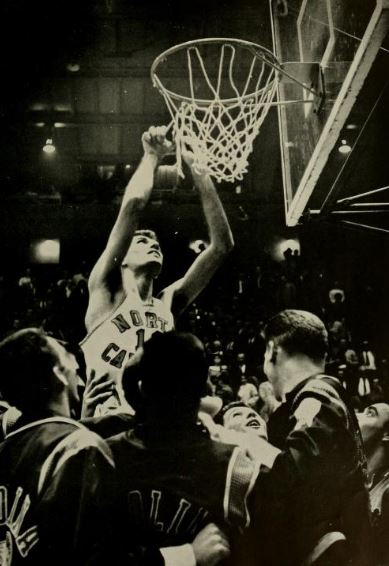
The Tar Heels' Lennie Rosenbluth cuts down the nets after winning the Dixie Classic.

The North Carolina Tar Heels were coached by Frank McGuire, who was in his fifth season as the team's head coach. His offensive philosophy centered around passing before shooting. McGuire's starting line up, and most of the roster, consisted primarily of players from New York state due to McGuire's connections in the area from his time as St. John's head coach. Carolina squads prior to McGuire usually had several in-state players and select out of state talent. Tommy Kearns and Pete Brennan were two offensive specialists. Center Joe Quigg provided a solid presence in the paint (free throw lane) and grabbed almost nine rebounds per game. Guard Bob Cunningham was one of the team's best defensive players. Lennie Rosenbluth, who averaged almost twenty-eight points a game and served as the team's clutch performer, led the team.

North Carolina began their 1956–57 campaign with three straight wins by a wide margin of victory. In their fourth game, the Tar Heels traveled to Columbia, South Carolina, to play the South Carolina Gamecocks. They took the Tar Heels to overtime before North Carolina was able to come away with a four-point victory. Near the end of December, the Tar Heels participated in the annual Dixie Classic. They won it and remained undefeated after beating the Wake Forest Demon Deacons in the championship game. North Carolina then won five more games before going into double overtime against the Maryland Terrapins winning the game 65–61 to earn their seventeenth consecutive victory. In the following game, the Duke Blue Devils and North Carolina were tied with 73 points each before Tar Heel Kearns sank two free throws to give North Carolina a two-point lead before the game ended. The Tar Heels closed out the regular season with six more victories to finish with a record of 24–0. North Carolina won their quarterfinal match-up in the ACC tournament by twenty points to advance to the semifinals against Wake Forest. The Demon Deacons were leading 59–58 as the game entered the final minute. With time running out, Rosenbluth made a two-point shot but was fouled in the act of shooting, which sent him to the line to shoot a free throw; he made the free throw and the Tar Heels won 61–59. The Tar Heels then beat South Carolina in the championship to earn a berth in the NCAA Tournament.

The Tar Heels defeated the Yale Bulldogs 90–74 in the NCAA East Regional Quarterfinal to advance to the semifinal against Canisius College. North Carolina won the game by twelve points allowing them to move on to the NCAA East Regional Final against the Syracuse Orange. The final, and the semifinal, was held at the Palestra in Philadelphia, Pennsylvania. The Syracuse Orange fell to the Tar Heels 67–58 allowing them to advance to the Final Four in Kansas City, Missouri. The Tar Heels' opponent for the national semifinal was the Michigan State Spartans. The Tar Heels were tied with the Spartans as regulation time was winding down. Michigan State's Jack Quiggle made a half court shot that would have given the Spartans the lead, but it left his hands after time expired, nullifying the basket. In the first overtime, Michigan State had a two-point lead with eleven seconds remaining and had a player at the foul line. The Spartan missed both shots. Carolina's Brennan gathered the rebound, dribbled down the court, and made a shot as time expired to send the game to a second overtime. The Tar Heels pulled away in the third overtime to win the game 74–70. The game saw the lead change thirty-one times before the Tar Heels were able to emerge victorious after three overtime periods.

=== Kansas Jayhawks ===
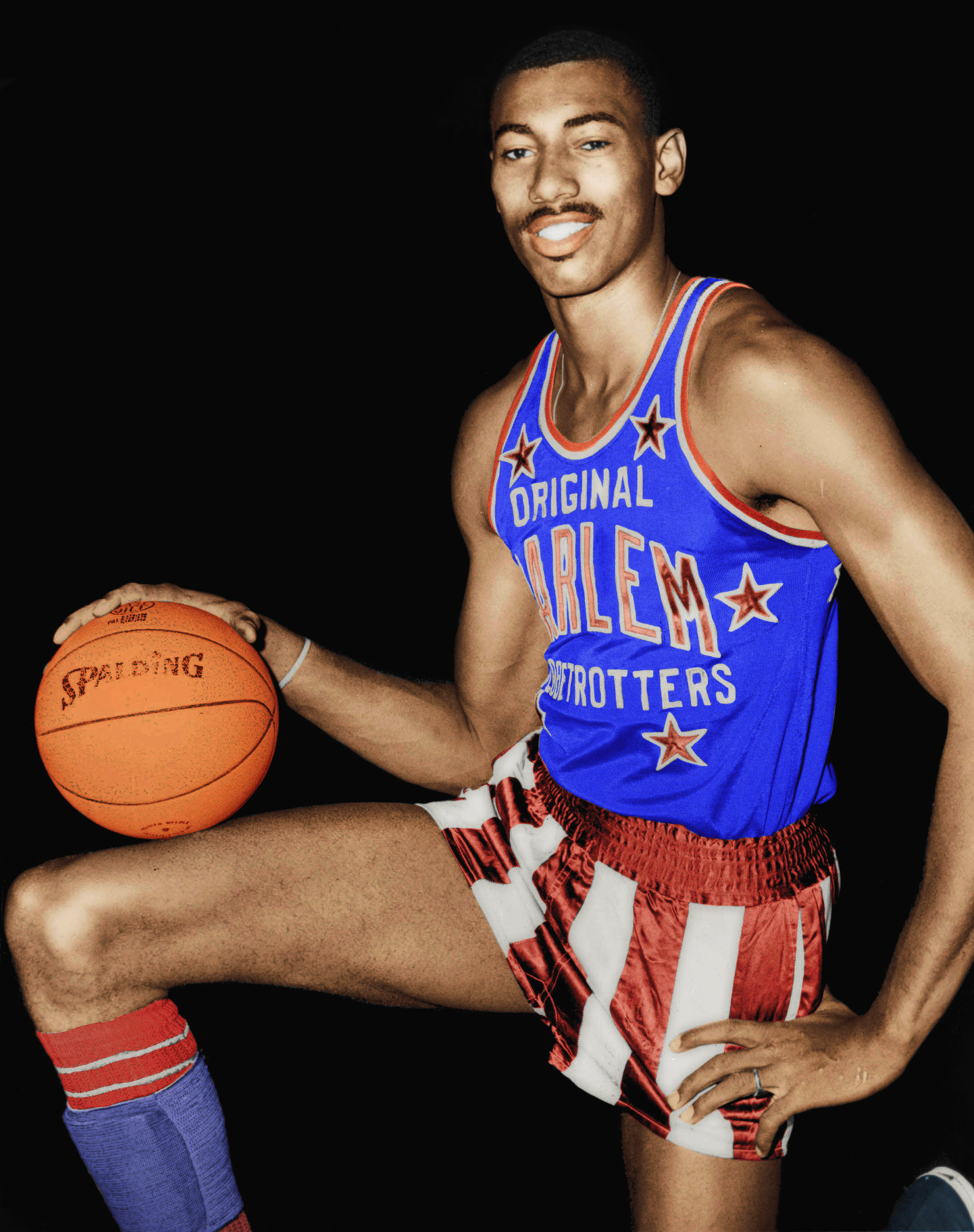
Sophomore Wilt Chamberlain (pictured in 1959) joined the Kansas varsity basketball team in 1956.

Dick Harp was in the midst of his first season as head coach of the Kansas Jayhawks when the team entered the national championship game. Kansas began the season favored to win the national title. This was due in large part to Wilt Chamberlain joining the varsity team after finishing his freshman year on the freshman team per NCAA rules. At the beginning of the season, the Jayhawks starting line up consisted of seniors Gene Elstun, Maurice King, John Parker, Lew Johnson, and sophomore Chamberlain. Ron Loneski replaced Johnson in the starting line up during the season. Harp began the season with a man-to-man defense, but later switched to a zone defense to give the Jayhawks an advantage in rebounding the basketball.

The Jayhawks began the regular season with twelve consecutive victories before losing to the Iowa State Cyclones by two points having lost the lead in the closing seconds of the game. Kansas' next game was against Iowa State; this time, the Jayhawks won the game by a margin of nine points. The Jayhawks won their next four games before losing to the Oklahoma State Cowboys in Stillwater, Oklahoma. The shot clock was not in use in 1957 allowing the Cowboys to hold the ball for the final three and a half minutes and win the game 56–54. Both of the Jayhawks' regular season losses were due in part to their poor ball control. The Jayhawks' squad closed out the regular season with four more victories, finishing the regular season with a conference best 11–1 record, earning them the Big Seven Conference regular season crown and a berth in the NCAA Tournament.

In the first round of the NCAA Tournament, the Jayhawks faced the Southern Methodist Mustangs and were forced into an overtime period. With 36 points from Chamberlain, the Jayhawks won 73–65 to advance to the regional finals. There, they defeated the Oklahoma City Stars 81–61 to reach the Final Four. Chamberlain posted 30 points in the contest, adding 15 rebounds. The two-time defending NCAA Tournament champions, the San Francisco Dons, faced Kansas at the Final Four's host site, Kansas City. With a field goal percentage of almost 60 percent, the Jayhawks posted an 80–56 win to advance to the championship game against undefeated North Carolina, the number one-ranked team in the country. Even though the Tar Heels were undefeated, and ranked number one in the nation, Kansas entered the game as a three-point favorite, mostly because playing in Kansas City—close to nearby Lawrence, the school's location—was virtually a home game.

=== Team rosters ===
1956–57 North Carolina Tar Heels roster
No.	Name	Position	Height	Weight	Class
10	Lennie Rosenbluth	F	6–5	180	Sr.
11	Ken Rosemond	G	5–10	155	Jr.
20	Bob Young	C	6–6	220	Sr.
22	Roy Searcy	F	6–4	185	Jr.
31	Gehrmann Holland	F	6–3	200	So.
32	Bob Cunningham	G	6–4	190	Jr.
33	Danny Lotz	F	6–7	198	So.
35	Pete Brennan	F	6–6	190	Jr.
40	Tommy Kearns	G	5–11	191	Jr.
41	Joe Quigg	C	6–9	210	Jr.

1956–57 Kansas Jayhawks roster
No.	Name	Position	Height	Weight	Class
8	Maurice King	G	6–2½	190	Sr.
12	Gene Elstun	F	6–3¼	175	Sr.
13	Wilt Chamberlain	C	7–0	214	So.
21	Eddie Dater	G	6–2½	195	Sr.
22	John Parker	G	6–0	173	Sr.
24	Blaine Hollinger	G	5–10¼	159	Sr.
25	Lew Johnson	C–F	6–6	198	Sr.
29	Lee Green	F	6–5¼	190	Sr.
31	Harry Jett	F	6–3	166	Sr.
32	Bob Billings	G	5–11½	173	So.
33	Ron Loneski	F	6–4½	215	So.
34	Lynn Kindred	G	6–2¼	156	So.
35	Monte Johnson	F	6–5	168	So.

== Broadcasting ==
The national semifinal between Kansas and San Francisco was not televised, while the North Carolina-Michigan State Spartans match-up was broadcast in some areas. Plans to televise the national championship game were made in advance in anticipation that the Kansas Jayhawks would reach the championship game. By the time the match-up was set between the Jayhawks and the Tar Heels, an eleven-station network had been organized. Castleman D. Chesley, a local television producer, broadcast the game in North Carolina on five stations. After the Tar Heels won the Eastern Regional, Chesley managed to get announcers, sponsors and five stations to set up a network to broadcast North Carolina's Final Four games from Kansas City. Locally, the game was to appear on channels 9 and 13. The 1957 national championship game saw the largest media crowd to date for a men's basketball game. Over eleven television stations, 73 radio stations, and 63 news writers were represented.

== Game summary ==
=== First half ===
The game began with a tip-off between Kansas' seven foot tall Chamberlain and North Carolina's Kearns, who was not even six feet tall. Coach McGuire used Kearns after he had talked down Chamberlain the night before. The rest of the North Carolina squad set up in their zone defense rather than around the center circle as McGuire requested to "show them the zone we were going to use." The Jayhawks were unable to score on their opening possession and set up in their defense as the Tar Heels came down the court with the ball. Kansas' initial defense was a box-and-one, which consisted of four players in a box around a basket while one player, King, played defense on North Carolina's Rosenbluth. Kearns received a pass along the baseline and was fouled in the act of shooting. He missed the shot, but made both free throws to give Carolina the early 2–0 lead. Kansas missed a jump shot, and North Carolina's Joe Quigg converted a 12-foot baseline shot. Kansas scored their first points from two free throws.

Coach Frank McGuire started the Tar Heels in a 2–3 zone defense at the beginning of the game.

The Tar Heels' began to strain Kansas' defense with several players making perimeter shots. When combined with Kansas' inability to convert from the field, this allowed the Tar Heels to jump out to an 11–4 lead. This led Harp to change Kansas' defensive formation to a 2–3 zone defense, with Chamberlain under the basket. Rosenbluth—who was now relatively unguarded compared to Kansas' previous formation—made a contested seventeen-foot jumper. Kansas retaliated by giving the ball to Chamberlain who was then fouled as he went up for a shot. He went to the free-throw line and made one of two shots. As Kansas went up the floor coach Harp ordered his squad to revert to their original box–and–one. Carolina's Kearns made a jumper from the floor after pump faking to lose a defender, which brought the score to 15–7 in favor of Carolina. Kansas came up the floor and missed their shot, but Chamberlain grabbed the rebound and was then fouled in the air. He went to the line for a one–and–one and missed the first shot, while Rosenbluth caught the rebound.

During the following possession, Harp changed Jayhawks' defense to a man-to-man. This caused the Tar Heels to become more active with several screens and movement on offense. The possession resulted in an off-the-ball foul that sent Rosenbluth to the free-throw line where he made both shots. Kansas pushed the ball up the court quickly with King taking an eight-foot shot. Carolina collected the rebound and continued to slow the tempo in the half-court as Kansas shifted back into a 2–3 zone. The Tar Heels passed the ball back and forth until the Jayhawks broke from their zone and went into a man-to-man again. Kearns made a close-quarters shot near the basket. Kansas stepped up their defense at the behest of coach Harp and held Carolina scoreless for two minutes. During that time Kansas made four free throws to cut their deficit to two points—the score now 19–17. The Tar Heels continued to slow the pace and work the ball around to get the open shot, while the Jayhawks would rush up the court and attempt to give the ball to Chamberlain before taking a poor shot. This resulted in moderate success for both teams as North Carolina scored eight points to Kansas' three before the final two minutes began. In the closing two minutes, the two teams both scored two free throws to bring the score to 29–22 in favor of North Carolina.

=== Second half ===
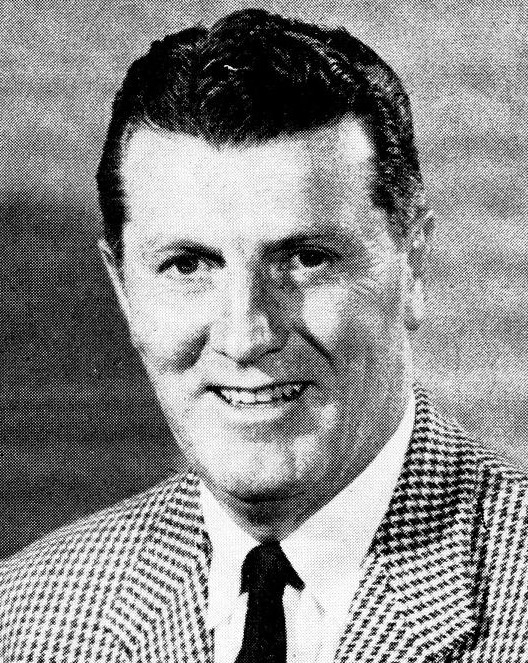
Frank McGuire (pictured in 1960) was the head coach of the North Carolina Tar Heels for the 1956–57 season.

The second half began with another jump ball between the two competing teams. Chamberlain won the tip as Carolina sent out Quigg this time to contest the jump, not Kearns. Both teams failed to score on their first possession, but after Carolina missed their opening shot, Kansas scored on a fast-break pull-up shot. Kansas scored once more—from a lob to Chamberlain—before the Tar Heels were able to score with a baseline jump shot from Quigg to bring the score to 31–26. Kansas closed the lead to 31–30 with a basket and a pair of free throws from Chamberlain. Carolina's Kearns returned with an acrobatic layup to extend the lead to three points.

After Kansas failed to convert a shot on their next possession, North Carolina proceeded to pass the ball around the perimeter of the court for close to two minutes. After finding the right setup, Rosenbluth drove to the basket and scored. Following that possession, Kansas began to make outside jump shots. When combined with Carolina's inability to score, Kansas' improved jump shots led to a 10–2 Kansas run, with Kansas taking the lead nine minutes into the second half. In addition, as North Carolina players continued to foul Chamberlain to make him score from the free throw line, they began to get into foul trouble. Kansas' coach Harp had his team hold the ball beginning with their next possession. This plan worked for a while and Carolina was unable to overcome Kansas' three-point lead; Kansas did not attempt a shot for over five minutes.

With 1:45 remaining in the game, Kansas' Elstun was fouled by Rosenbluth on a lay-up attempt. This was Rosenbluth's fifth foul, which disqualified him for the rest of the game. Elstun missed the two free throws from the foul, and Carolina got the rebound. The Jayhawks were able to score only two points after Rosenbluth's disqualification. North Carolina then began to rally after scoring a basket and then an accompanying free throw. Bob Young—who had replaced Rosenbluth after his fifth foul—scored a lay-up bringing Carolina to within two points. Carolina tied the game at 46–46 after Kearns made a free throw in the closing seconds. The Tar Heels got the ball back and held it for one final possession. The ball was passed to Cunningham who missed his initial shot, but was able to get the rebound. Cunningham went up for another shot, but received heavy contact from Chamberlain. No foul was called and the time ran out, sending the game to overtime.

=== Overtime periods ===
Overtime began with a jump ball won by Chamberlain for Kansas. He quickly passed the ball to King who took a jump shot that missed. Carolina's Cunningham grabbed the rebound. The Tar Heels traversed the court and Young managed to score a basket to give Carolina the edge. However, North Carolina was unable to stop Kansas during the ensuing drive as Chamberlain scored a basket to bring the score to 48–48. After Kansas scored the tying basket, North Carolina proceeded to hold the ball for one final shot before the overtime period ended. Carolina's Kearns drove and put up a shot that was blocked by Chamberlain as time ran out.

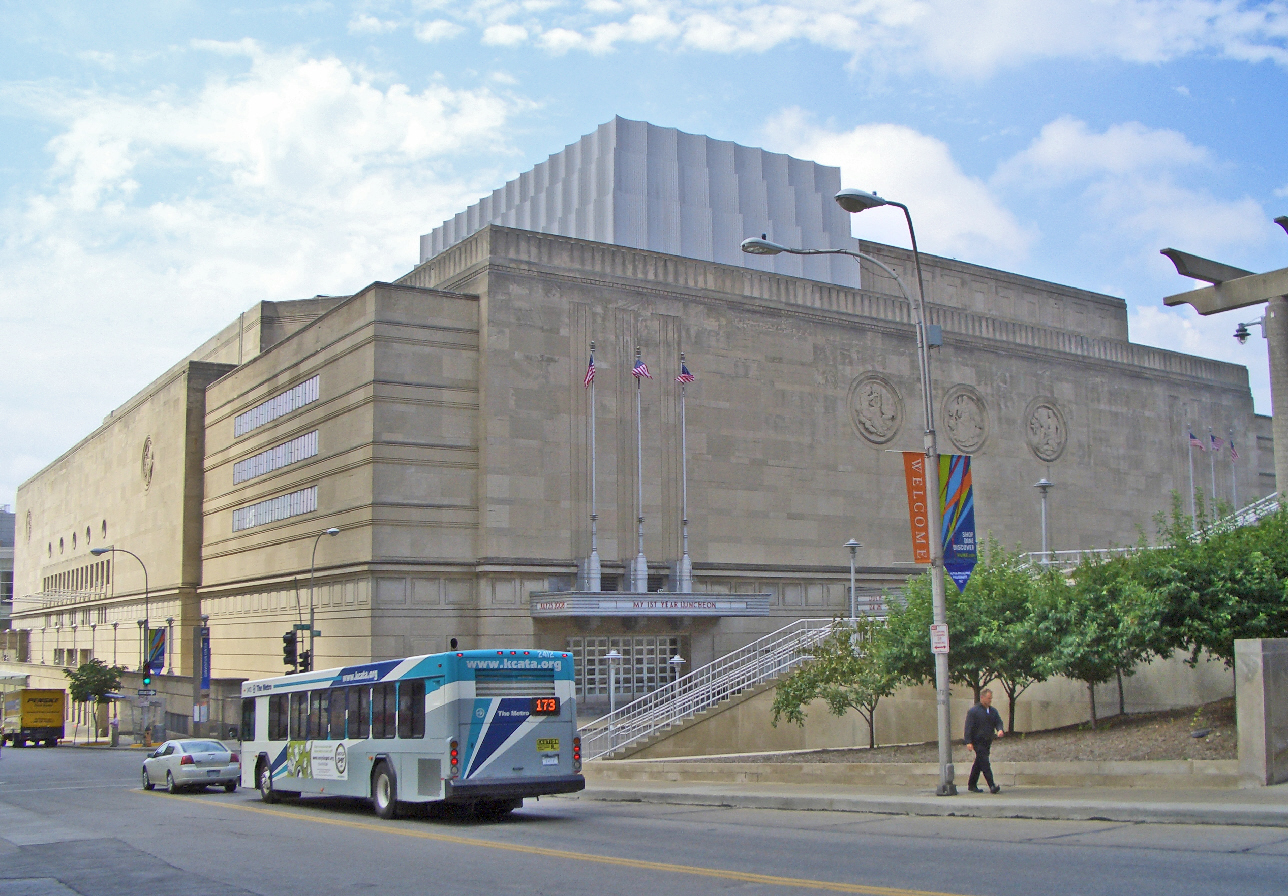
The NCAA National Championship and national semifinal games took place in the Municipal Auditorium in Kansas City, Missouri.

North Carolina's first possession of the second overtime period ended with a turnover, while Kansas missed a long jump shot in theirs. North Carolina's Brennan boxed out Chamberlain who went over him to collect the rebound and was called for over the back. Joe Quigg turned the ball over after traveling, while Chamberlain threw the ball out of bounds on the subsequent possession. Carolina failed to capitalize on Chamberlain's error when Kearns missed the front end of a one-and-one. Kansas came down the court and passed the ball to Chamberlain who was then fouled hard by Cunningham. This sparked an altercation between the teams, resulting in Chamberlain being hit in the stomach with a megaphone and his knee being scarred by a Carolina cheerleader. The referees stopped the commotion, and Chamberlain was sent to the free-throw line. He missed both shots, and Carolina got the rebound. The Tar Heels aimed to hold the ball for a final, shot but they turned the ball over to Kansas with ten seconds to go. Then the Jayhawks called a timeout with six seconds left. The ball went to Kansas' Loneski who missed a shot, and the game remained tied at 48.

After a one-minute break between periods, the third overtime began with another jump ball again won by Chamberlain. After King missed the opening shot of the period, Carolina's Kearns made a right-handed lay-up to bring the score to 50–48. Kansas failed to score again, and this time Kearns missed his shot after being fouled; he then made both free throws. Off a pass from Loneski, Chamberlain made a shot, was fouled, and made the ensuing free throw to complete the three-point play and bring the Jayhawks within one point. Cunningham was fouled after being trapped in a double team and then missed the first shot of the one-and-one. The Jayhawks' Loneski missed a contested, close layup, but King got the offensive rebound and was fouled on a put back shot. King made one of the free throws and tied the score at 52–52.

On the next possession, Kansas' John Parker stole the ball and crossed half court when coach Harp called a timeout. Chamberlain received the ball in the post, went up for a shot and received some contact; however, no referee called a foul and the ball rolled out of bounds off Carolina. On the next play, Elstun was run into by a Tar Heel and went to the foul line for two shots with 31 seconds remaining; he missed the first and made the second shot. Out of timeouts, Kearns drove into the lane and put up a shot that was blocked out of bounds by Chamberlain. The following play, Quigg pump-faked and went up for a shot that Chamberlain blocked; however, simultaneously King made contact with Quigg's body while he was shooting and the referees called a shooting foul. Quigg went to the free-throw line for two shots with six seconds to go and made both, giving the Tar Heels the lead 54–53. Kansas called a timeout and in-bounded to Loneski who then passed the ball towards Chamberlain who was under the basket. The pass was underthrown, and Quigg tipped the ball away from Chamberlain. Kearns grabbed it and got away from a defender before he threw the ball into the air to run out the clock. Time expired as the ball was in the air and the Tar Heels won the national championship.

== Box score ==
March 23, 1957
9:00 pm CDT

#1 North Carolina Tar Heels 54, #2 Kansas Jayhawks 53 (3OT)
Scoring by half: 29–22, 17–24 Overtime: 8–7
Pts: Lennie Rosenbluth 20; Rebs: Pete Brennan 11	Pts: Wilt Chamberlain 23; Rebs: Wilt Chamberlain 14

Municipal Auditorium, Kansas City, Missouri
Attendance: 7,778
Referees: Joe Conway and Hagan Anderson

Legend
Pos	Position	FGM	Field goals made	FGA	Field goals attempted	FTM	Free throws made
FTA	Free throws attempted	Reb	Rebounds	PF	Personal fouls	Pts	Points

North Carolina Tar Heels
Player	Pos	FGM	FGA	FTM	FTA	Reb	PF	Pts
Pete Brennan	F	4	8	3	7	11	3	11
Bob Cunningham	G	0	3	0	0	6	4	0
Tommy Kearns	G	4	8	3	7	3	4	11
Danny Lotz	F	0	0	0	0	2	0	0
Lennie Rosenbluth	F	8	15	4	4	6	5	20
Joe Quigg	C	4	10	2	3	10	4	10
Bob Young	C	1	1	0	0	4	1	2
Team totals		21	45	12	22	42	21	54

Kansas Jayhawks
Player	Pos	FGM	FGA	FTM	FTA	Reb	PF	Pts
Bob Billings	F	0	0	0	0	0	2	0
Wilt Chamberlain	F	6	13	11	16	14	3	23
Gene Elstun	C	4	12	3	6	5	2	11
Lew Johnson	G	0	1	2	2	0	1	2
Maurice King	G	3	12	5	6	5	4	11
Ron Loneski	F	0	5	2	3	4	2	2
John Parker	G	2	4	0	0	0	0	4
Team totals		15	47	23	33	28	14	53

== Aftermath ==
Despite his team losing the championship game, Kansas' Chamberlain was named the NCAA tournament's Most Outstanding Player. He was also named to the Consensus All-American squad for the 1956–57 season. North Carolina's Rosenbluth was named the Helms Foundation College Basketball Player of the Year for his performance throughout the basketball season, as well as a Consensus All-American. The Tar Heels' coach McGuire was named UPI College Basketball Coach of the Year for leading North Carolina to a win in the National Championship game and a perfect record of 32–0.

The television contract that the Atlantic Coast Conference agreed to with Castleman Chesley led to the athletic conference's growth in the period after.

While coach McGuire and Rosenbluth boarded a plane to New York to appear on The Ed Sullivan Show, the rest of the Tar Heels returned to North Carolina two days later where they landed at Raleigh–Durham International Airport (RDU). Over 10,000 fans greeted the North Carolina squad. Some players were carried by members of the crowd from the airport ramp to the terminal. The airport manager believed the crowd gathered to meet the Tar Heels was the biggest in RDU's history. It was so big it prevented Chancellor Robert House from giving a planned speech for the team. The size of the crowd at the airport was credited to the broadcast of both the national semifinal and National Championship games on television around North Carolina.

In Chapel Hill, North Carolina, Tar Heel fans who had watched the game on television flooded Franklin Street after the victory over the Jayhawks. Over two thousand people rushed the street preventing cars from passing for over an hour. Police were required to help maintain order. This has since turned into a tradition where people overrun Franklin Street following a Tar Heel win over the Duke Blue Devils or whenever they have won a National Championship.

Chamberlain was criticized for his inability to lead Kansas to a win in the National Championship game; He later admitted this loss was the most painful in his life. He returned to Kansas for his junior year and to play another season under coach Harp. Chamberlain quickly became frustrated with the opposing teams' way of playing him, which consisted primarily of double- or triple-teaming him to limit his offensive production and effectiveness. In addition, many teams resorted to running out the time on the clock when they had the lead over the Jayhawks to increase their odds of winning the game. After the Jayhawks failed to qualify for the NCAA Tournament that year, Chamberlain decided to forgo his senior season to play with the Harlem Globetrotters. He did not return to Kansas' campus for over 40 years after leaving for the Globetrotters; he finally returned in 1998, the year before his death, when his jersey was retired.

The 1957 North Carolina players were awarded watches for their part in the winning the national championship. (In the 1990s, the players were given rings to commemorate their win in the national championship game at the insistence of then-North Carolina coach Dean Smith.) Coach McGuire was given a brand new Carolina blue and white Cadillac by the university and signed a new five-year contract worth $11,500 per year. After seeing the success of televising the tournament's final games, Castleman Chesley believed, "ACC basketball could be as popular as any TV show in North Carolina." The broadcast of North Carolina's national semifinal and National Championship games led to increased awareness and attention towards basketball around the state. It also led to Chesley and the Atlantic Coast Conference agreeing to a television contract whereby he would broadcast twelve ACC games league-wide during the 1957–58 season. The games aired on Saturdays the following season were called the ACC Game of the Week. The television contract allowed the league to expand and increase the conference's visibility. It also led to an increase in ticket sales for the members of the ACC. More children began to pick up the sport of basketball as a result of the increase in the number of ACC games being televised.
