= List of North Carolina Tar Heels in the NBA draft =

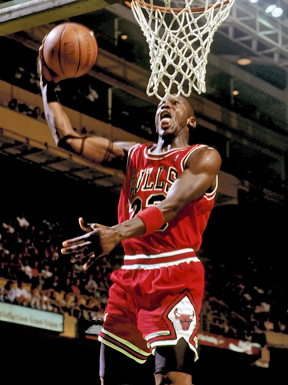
Michael Jordan was drafted third overall by the Chicago Bulls in the 1984 NBA Draft.

The North Carolina Tar Heels men's basketball team, representing the University of North Carolina at Chapel Hill, has had 113 players drafted into the National Basketball Association (NBA) since the league began holding the yearly event in 1947. Each NBA franchise seeks to add new players through an annual draft. The NBA uses a draft lottery to determine the first three picks of the NBA draft; the 14 teams that did not make the playoffs the previous year are eligible to participate. After the first three picks are decided, the rest of the teams pick in reverse order of their win–loss record. To be eligible for the NBA draft, a player in the United States must be at least 19 years old during the calendar year of the draft and must be at least one year removed from the graduation of his high school class.

The drafts held between 1947 and 1949 were held by the Basketball Association of America (BAA). The BAA became the National Basketball Association after absorbing teams from the National Basketball League in the fall of 1949. Official NBA publications include the BAA Drafts as part of the NBA's draft history. From 1967 until the ABA–NBA merger in 1976, the American Basketball Association (ABA) held its own draft.

Through the 2019 NBA draft, a Tar Heel has been chosen first overall two times in the history of the event, James Worthy in 1982 and Brad Daugherty in 1986. Out of the thirty teams that currently make up the NBA, seven have not picked a player from North Carolina. The New York Knicks have selected nine former Tar Heels, which is the most of any current NBA franchise. Fifty-two Tar Heels have been drafted in the first round of the NBA Draft, with Coby White, Cameron Johnson, and Nassir Little being the latest. The most Tar Heels selected in the first round of a single NBA Draft is four, which happened twice, in 2005 and 2012. Sixteen players have been selected to either an ABA or NBA All-Star Game, sixteen have been a member of an NBA or ABA championship winning team, and nine have achieved both. The most Tar Heels selected in a single NBA Draft is five, in 1980. Of all the Tar Heels that have been drafted, five have been inducted into the Naismith Memorial Basketball Hall of Fame.

== Key ==
G	Guard	F	Forward	C	Center

*	Selected to an NBA/ABA All-Star Game
†	Won an NBA/ABA championship
‡	Selected to an All-Star Game and won an NBA/ABA championship

== Players selected in the NBA draft ==
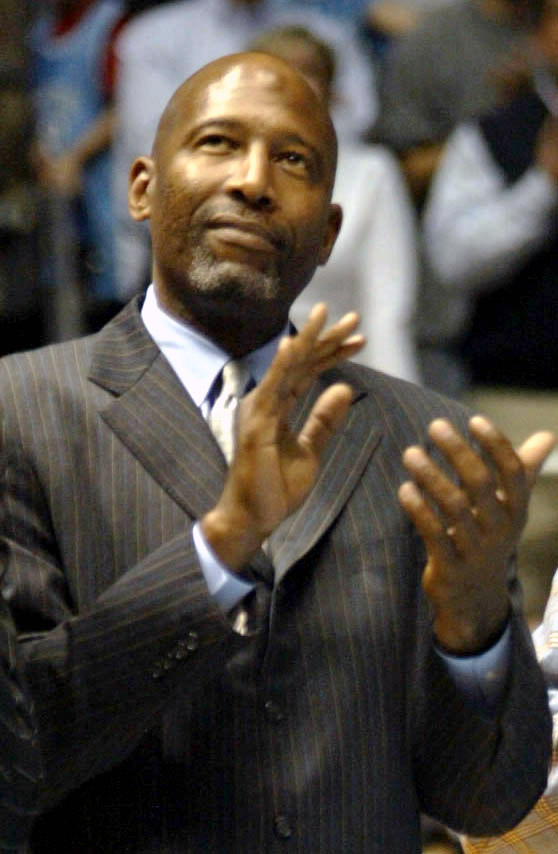
James Worthy was drafted first overall by the Los Angeles Lakers in the 1982 NBA Draft.

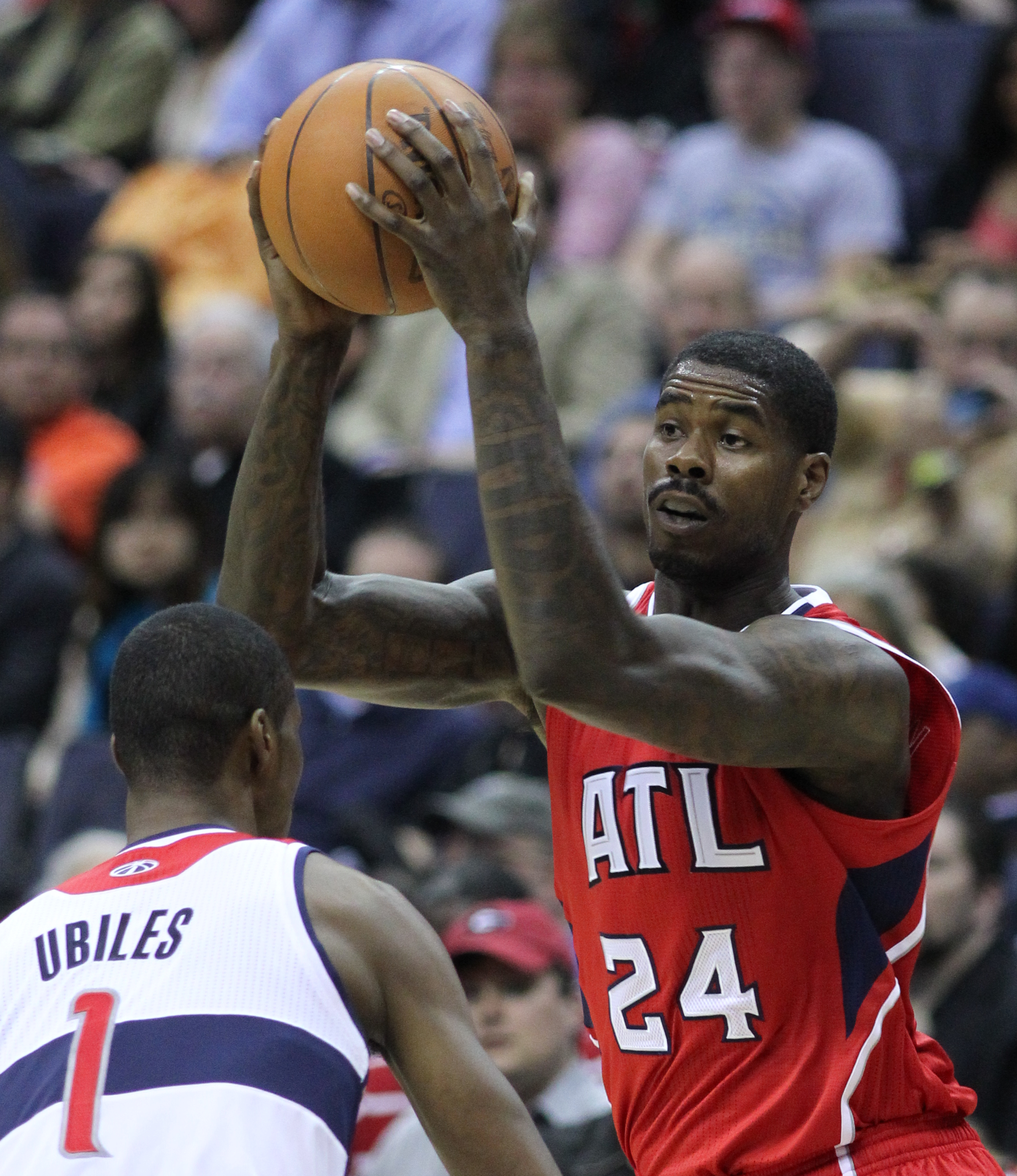
Marvin Williams was drafted second overall by the Atlanta Hawks in the 2005 NBA Draft.

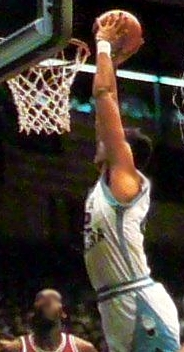
Brad Daugherty was drafted first overall by the Cleveland Cavaliers in the 1986 NBA draft .

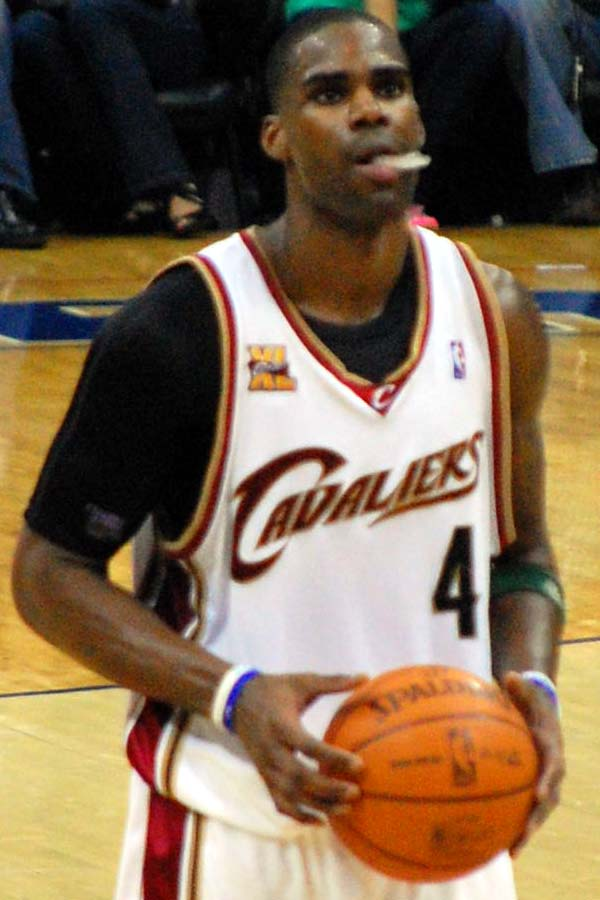
Antawn Jamison was drafted fourth overall by the Toronto Raptors in the 1998 NBA Draft.

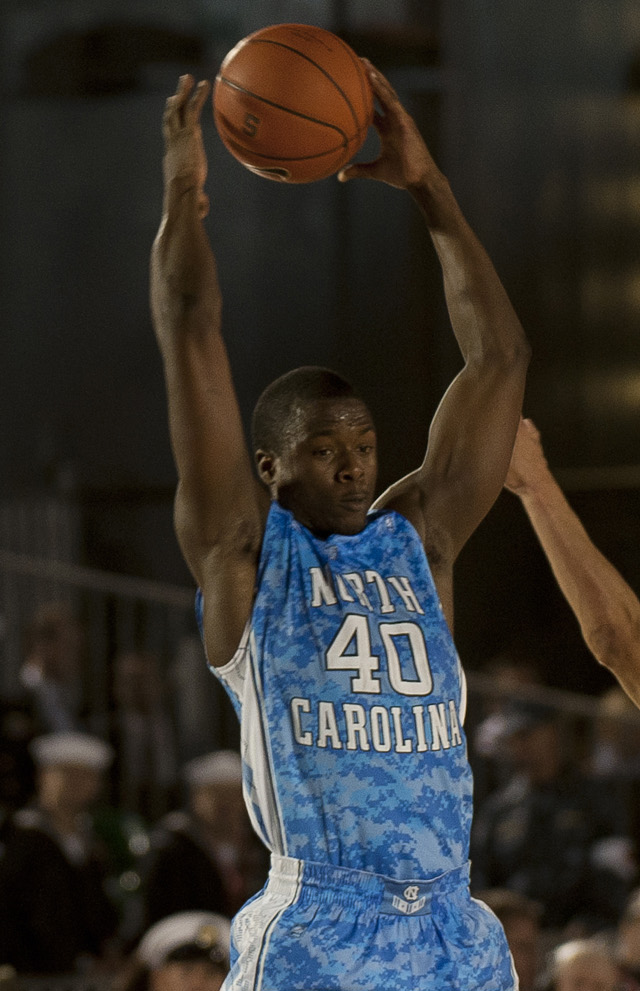
Harrison Barnes was drafted seventh overall by the Golden State Warriors in the 2012 NBA Draft.

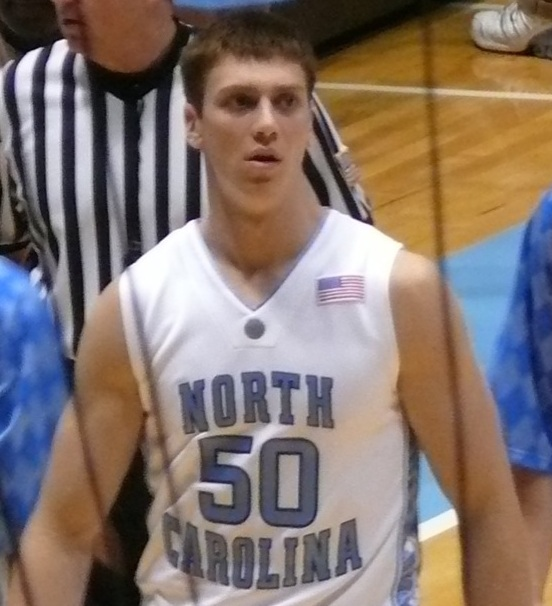
Tyler Hansbrough was drafted thirteenth overall by the Indiana Pacers in the 2009 NBA Draft.

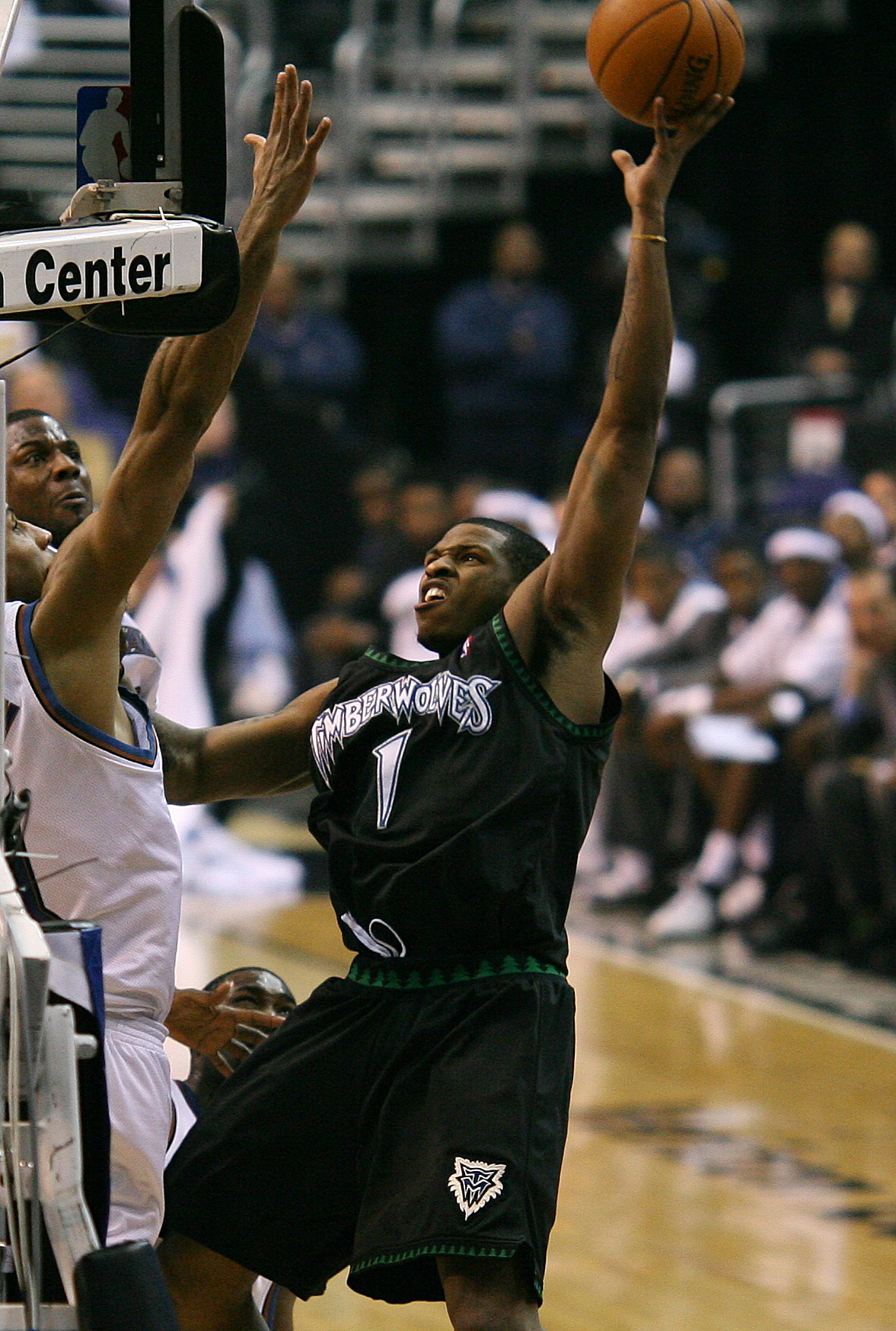
Rashad McCants was drafted fourteenth overall by the Minnesota Timberwolves in the 2005 NBA Draft.

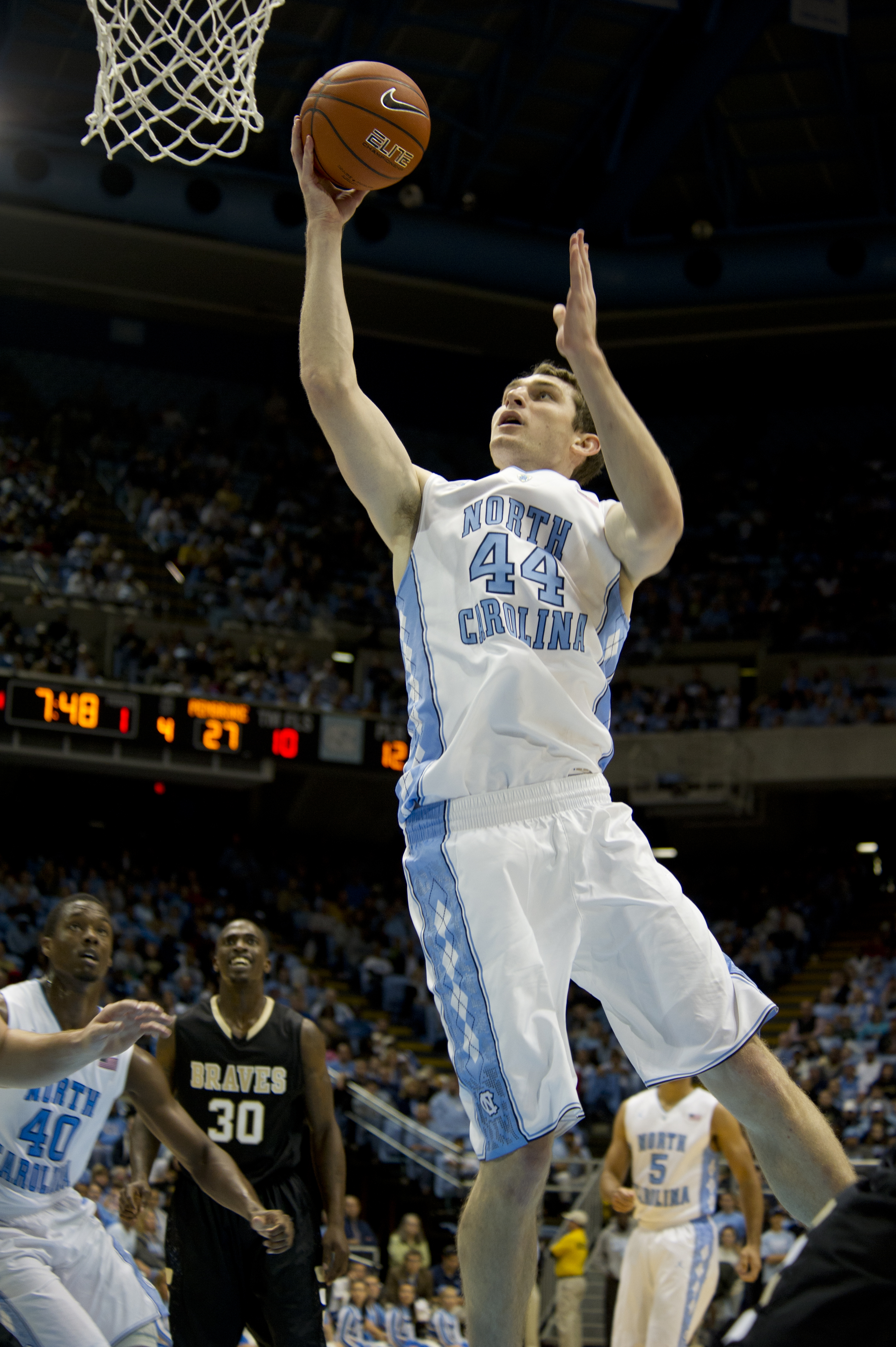
Tyler Zeller was drafted seventeenth overall by the Dallas Mavericks in the 2012 NBA Draft.

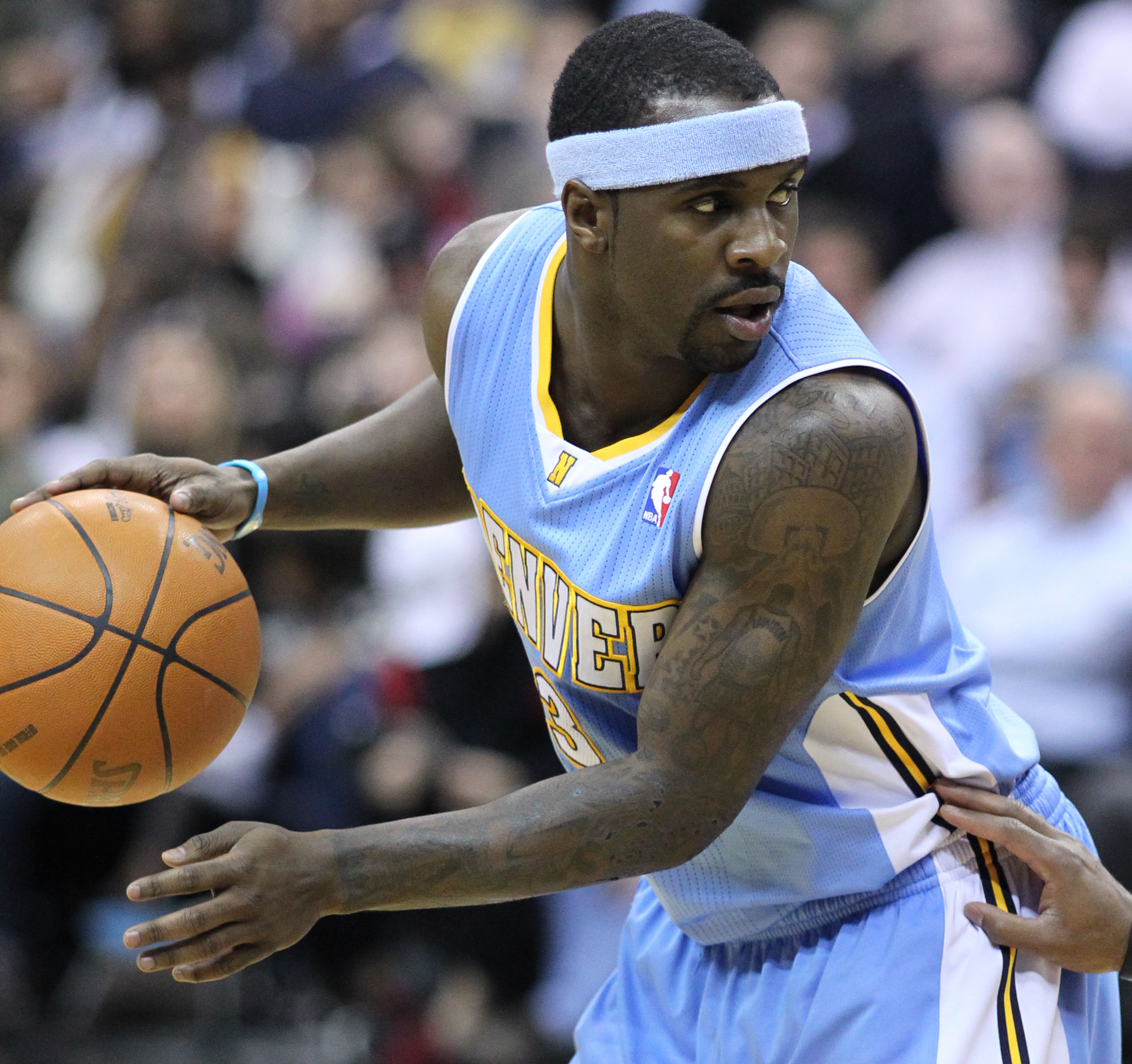
Ty Lawson was drafted eighteenth overall by the Minnesota Timberwolves in the 2009 NBA Draft.

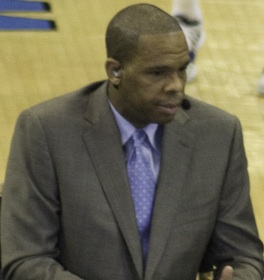
Hubert Davis was drafted twentieth overall by the New York Knicks in the 1992 NBA Draft.

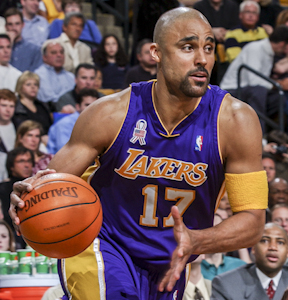
Rick Fox was drafted 24th overall by the Boston Celtics in the 1991 NBA Draft.

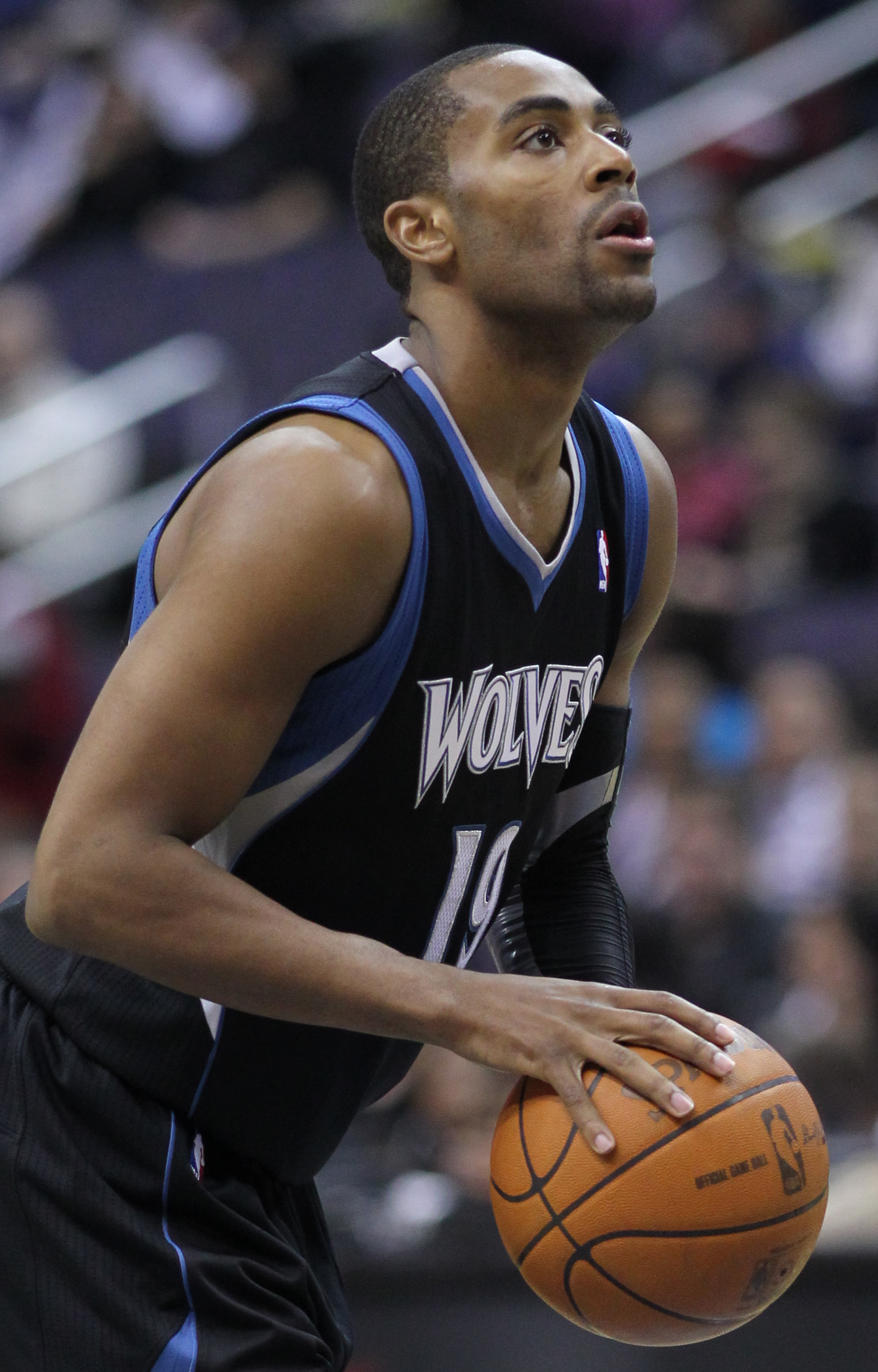
Wayne Ellington was drafted 28th overall by the Minnesota Timberwolves in the 2009 NBA Draft.

North Carolina Tar Heels selected in the NBA draft
Year	Round	Pick	Overall	Name	Position	Team (Note: This is the team that drafted the player, not their most recent team.)	Notes
1957	1	6	6	Lennie Rosenbluth	F	Philadelphia Warriors	—
1958	1	4	4	Pete Brennan	F	New York Knicks	—
1958	2	4	12	Joe Quigg	F, C	New York Knicks	—
1958	4	6	29	Tommy Kearns	G	Syracuse Nationals	—
1960	1	5	5	Lee Shaffer*	F	Syracuse Nationals	NBA All-Star (1963)
1960	6	6	46	York Larese (Note: The NBA had a rule which stated a player was not eligible for the NBA Draft until four years after he graduated high school. York Larese was eligible for the NBA Draft as a junior since he missed the 1957–58 season due to an injury. Larese was a junior at North Carolina when he was selected with the 6th pick in the 6th round of the 1960 NBA Draft by the St. Louis Hawks. He chose to return to North Carolina for his senior year and was later drafted by the Chicago Packers with the 11th pick in the 2nd round of the 1961 NBA Draft.)	G	St. Louis Hawks	—
1960	7	4	52	Doug Moe^{‡} (Note: The NBA had a rule which stated a player was not eligible for the NBA Draft until four years after he graduated high school. Doug Moe was eligible for the NBA Draft as a junior since he spent a year at a prep school after he completed high school, after which he spent three years at North Carolina. Moe was a junior at North Carolina when he was selected with the 4th pick in the 7th round of the 1960 NBA Draft by the Detroit Pistons. He chose to return to North Carolina for his senior year and was later drafted by the Chicago Packers with the 13th pick in the 2nd round of the 1961 NBA Draft.)	G, F	Detroit Pistons	ABA All-Star (1968, 1969, 1970); ABA Champion (1969)
1961	2	11	20	York Larese	G	Chicago Packers	—
1961	2	13	22	Doug Moe^{‡}	G, F	Chicago Packers	ABA All-Star (1968, 1969, 1970); ABA Champion (1969)
1961	11	7	97	Dick Kepley	F	St. Louis Hawks	—
1962	6	7	50	Jim Hudock	F	Philadelphia Warriors	—
1962	10	6	84	Ken McComb	C	Philadelphia Warriors	—
1962	11	5	89	Donnie Walsh	G	Philadelphia Warriors	—
1963	7	2	55	Larry Brown^{‡}	G	Baltimore Bullets	ABA All-Star (1968, 1969, 1970); ABA Champion (1969); ABA All-Star Game MVP (1968); Naismith Memorial Basketball Hall of Fame Inductee (2002)
1965	1	4	4	Billy Cunningham^{‡}	F, C	Philadelphia 76ers	NBA All-Star (1969, 1970, 1971, 1972); ABA All-Star (1973); NBA Champion (1967); ABA MVP (1973); All-NBA First Team (1969, 1970, 1971); All-NBA Second Team (1972); Naismith Memorial Basketball Hall of Fame Inductee (1986)
1966	13	1	101	Bob Bennett	C	New York Knicks	—
1967	4	8	39	Bob Lewis	G	San Francisco Warriors	—
1967	11	4	117	Mark Mirken	F	New York Knicks	—
1968	5	12	62	Larry Miller	G, F	Philadelphia 76ers	—
1969	2	11	26	Bill Bunting	F, C	New York Knicks	—
1969	6	12	83	Dick Grubar^{†}	G	Los Angeles Lakers	ABA Champion (1970)
1969	11	4	145	Rusty Clark	C	Detroit Pistons	—
1970	7	4	106	Charles Scott^{‡}	G	Boston Celtics	NBA All-Star (1973, 1974, 1975); ABA All-Star (1971, 1972); NBA Champion (1976); ABA Rookie of the Year (1971)
1971	5	13	81	Lee Dedmon	C	Los Angeles Lakers	—
1972	1	2	2	Robert McAdoo^{‡}	F, C	Buffalo Braves	NBA All-Star (1974, 1975, 1976, 1977, 1978); NBA Champion (1982, 1985); NBA MVP (1975); NBA Rookie of the Year (1973); NBA All-Rookie First Team (1973); All-NBA First Team (1974); All-NBA Second Team (1975); Naismith Memorial Basketball Hall of Fame Inductee (2000)
1972	2	14	27	Dennis Wuycik	F	Boston Celtics	—
1972	3	13	43	Bill Chamberlain	F	Golden State Warriors	—
1972	7	14	111	Steve Previs	G	Boston Celtics	—
1973	4	14	66	George Karl	G	New York Knicks	—
1973	18	1	207	Donn Johnson	F	Buffalo Braves	—
1974	1	5	5	Bobby Jones^{‡}	F	Houston Rockets	ABA All-Star (1976); NBA All-Star (1977, 1978, 1981, 1982); NBA Champion (1983); NBA Sixth Man of the Year (1983)
1974	3	7	43	Darrell Elston	G	Atlanta Hawks	—
1974	10	14	174	John O'Donnell	F	New York Knicks	—
1975	5	8	80	Donald Washington	F	New York Knicks	—
1975	5	13	85	Ed Stahl	F, C	Kansas City-Omaha Kings	—
1976	1	13	13	Mitch Kupchak^{†}	F, C	Washington Bullets	NBA Champion (1978, 1982, 1985, 1987, 1988) NBA All-Rookie First Team (1977)
1977	1	5	5	Walter Davis*	G, F	Phoenix Suns	NBA All-Star (1978, 1979, 1980, 1981, 1984, 1987); NBA Rookie of the Year (1978); NBA All-Rookie First Team (1978); All-NBA Second Team (1978, 1979)
1977	1	9	9	Tommy LaGarde^{†}	F, C	Denver Nuggets	NBA Champion (1979)
1977	3	9	53	John Kuester	G	Kansas City Kings	—
1977	6	15	125	Bruce Buckley	F	San Antonio Spurs	—
1978	1	2	2	Phil Ford	G	Kansas City Kings	NBA Rookie of the Year (1979); NBA All-Rookie First Team (1979); All-NBA Second Team (1979)
1978	4	4	70	Geff Crompton	C	Kansas City Kings	—
1978	8	12	164	Tom Zaliagris	G, F	Milwaukee Bucks	—
1979	1	13	13	Dudley Bradley	G, F	Indiana Pacers	—
1980	1	6	6	Mike O'Koren	F	New Jersey Nets	—
1980	3	3	49	John Virgil	G	Golden State Warriors	—
1980	3	15	61	Rich Yonakor	F	San Antonio Spurs	—
1980	4	17	86	Jeff Wolf	F	Milwaukee Bucks	—
1980	7	2	140	Dave Colescott	G	Utah Jazz	—
1981	1	4	4	Al Wood	G, F	Atlanta Hawks	—
1981	5	1	93	Pete Budko	F	Dallas Mavericks	—
1981	6	8	123	Mike Pepper	G	San Diego Clippers	—
1982	1	1	1	James Worthy^{‡}	F	Los Angeles Lakers	NBA All-Star (1986, 1987, 1988, 1989, 1990, 1991, 1992); NBA Champion (1985, 1987, 1988); NBA Finals MVP (1988); NBA All-Rookie First Team (1983); All-NBA Third Team (1990, 1991); Naismith Memorial Basketball Hall of Fame Inductee (2003)
1982	3	13	59	Jimmy Black	G	New Jersey Nets	—
1982	6	16	131	Chris Brust	F, C	Denver Nuggets	—
1982	7	15	153	Jeb Barlow	F	Denver Nuggets	—
1983	5	14	107	Jimmy Braddock	G	Denver Nuggets	—
1984	1	3	3	Michael Jordan^{‡}	G	Chicago Bulls	NBA All-Star (1985, 1986, 1987, 1988, 1989, 1990, 1991, 1992, 1993, 1996, 1997, 1998, 2002, 2003); NBA All-Star Game MVP (1988, 1993, 1998); NBA Champion (1991, 1992, 1993, 1996, 1997, 1998); NBA Finals MVP (1991, 1992, 1993, 1996, 1997, 1998); NBA MVP (1988, 1991, 1992, 1996, 1998); NBA Defensive Player of the Year (1988); NBA Rookie of the Year (1985); NBA All-Rookie First Team (1985); All-NBA First Team (1987, 1989, 1990, 1991, 1992, 1993, 1996, 1997, 1998); All-NBA Second Team (1985); Naismith Memorial Basketball Hall of Fame Inductee (2009)
1984	1	4	4	Sam Perkins	F	Dallas Mavericks	NBA All-Rookie First Team (1985)
1984	6	3	118	Matt Doherty	F	Cleveland Cavaliers	—
1984	9	10	194	Cecil Exum	F	Denver Nuggets	—
1985	7	8	147	Buzz Peterson	G	Cleveland Cavaliers	—
1986	1	1	1	Brad Daugherty*	C	Cleveland Cavaliers	NBA All-Star (1988, 1989, 1991, 1992, 1993); NBA All-Rookie First Team (1987); All-NBA Third Team (1992)
1986	4	3	73	Warren Martin	C	Cleveland Cavaliers	—
1986	4	11	81	Steve Hale	G	New Jersey Nets	—
1987	1	6	6	Kenny Smith^{†}	G	Sacramento Kings	NBA Champion (1994, 1995); NBA All-Rookie First Team (1988)
1987	1	13	13	Joe Wolf	F, C	Los Angeles Clippers	—
1987	4	19	88	Dave Popson	F, C	Detroit Pistons	—
1987	7	18	156	Curtis Hunter	F	Denver Nuggets	—
1989	1	5	5	J.R. Reid	F	Charlotte Hornets	NBA All-Rookie Second Team (1990)
1991	1	24	24	Rick Fox^{†}	F	Boston Celtics	NBA Champion (2000, 2001, 2002); NBA All-Rookie First Team (1992)
1991	1	27	27	Pete Chilcutt^{†}	F	Sacramento Kings	NBA Champion (1995)
1992	1	20	20	Hubert Davis	G	New York Knicks	—
1993	1	12	12	George Lynch	F	Los Angeles Lakers	—
1994	1	9	9	Eric Montross	C	Boston Celtics	NBA All-Rookie Second Team (1995)
1995	1	3	3	Jerry Stackhouse*	G, F	Philadelphia 76ers	NBA All-Star (2000, 2001); NBA All-Rookie First Team (1996)
1995	1	4	4	Rasheed Wallace^{‡}	F, C	Washington Bullets	NBA All-Star (2000, 2001, 2006, 2008); NBA Champion (2004); NBA All-Rookie Second Team (1996)
1996	2	8	37	Jeff McInnis	G	Denver Nuggets	—
1997	2	1	29	Serge Zwikker	C	Houston Rockets	—
1998	1	4	4	Antawn Jamison*	F	Toronto Raptors	NBA All-Star (2005, 2008); NBA Sixth Man of the Year (2004); NBA All-Rookie Second Team (1999)
1998	1	5	5	Vince Carter*	G, F	Golden State Warriors	NBA All-Star (2000, 2001, 2002, 2003, 2004, 2005, 2006, 2007); NBA Rookie of the Year (1999); NBA All-Rookie First Team (1999); All-NBA Second Team (2000); All-NBA Third Team (2001)
1998	2	5	34	Shammond Williams	G	Chicago Bulls	—
2001	1	20	20	Brendan Haywood^{†}	C	Cleveland Cavaliers	NBA Champion (2011)
2001	1	21	21	Joseph Forte	G	Boston Celtics	—
2005	1	2	2	Marvin Williams	F	Atlanta Hawks	NBA All-Rookie Second Team (2006)
2005	1	5	5	Raymond Felton	G	Charlotte Bobcats	NBA All-Rookie Second Team (2006)
2005	1	13	13	Sean May	F	Charlotte Bobcats	—
2005	1	14	14	Rashad McCants	G	Minnesota Timberwolves	—
2006	2	9	39	David Noel	F	Milwaukee Bucks	—
2007	1	8	8	Brandan Wright	F, C	Charlotte Bobcats	—
2007	2	14	44	Reyshawn Terry	F	Orlando Magic	—
2009	1	13	13	Tyler Hansbrough	F, C	Indiana Pacers	—
2009	1	18	18	Ty Lawson	G	Minnesota Timberwolves	—
2009	1	28	28	Wayne Ellington	G	Minnesota Timberwolves	—
2009	2	16	46	Danny Green^{†}	G, F	Cleveland Cavaliers	NBA Champion (2014, 2019 & 2020 )
2010	1	13	13	Ed Davis	F	Toronto Raptors	—
2012	1	7	7	Harrison Barnes^{†}	F	Golden State Warriors	NBA Champion (2015); NBA All-Rookie First Team (2013)
2012	1	13	13	Kendall Marshall	G	Phoenix Suns	—
2012	1	14	14	John Henson	F	Milwaukee Bucks	—
2012	1	17	17	Tyler Zeller	F, C	Dallas Mavericks	NBA All-Rookie Second Team (2013)
2013	1	25	25	Reggie Bullock	G, F	Los Angeles Clippers	—
2014	1	26	26	P. J. Hairston	G	Miami Heat	—
2015	2	28	58	J. P. Tokoto	G	Philadelphia 76ers	—
2016	1	25	25	Brice Johnson	F	Los Angeles Clippers	—
2016	2	25	55	Marcus Paige	G	Brooklyn Nets	—
2017	1	15	15	Justin Jackson	F	Sacramento Kings	—
2017	1	28	28	Tony Bradley	C	Utah Jazz	—
2019	1	7	7	Coby White	G	Chicago Bulls	NBA All-Rookie Second Team (2020)
2019	1	11	11	Cameron Johnson	F	Minnesota Timberwolves	—
2019	1	25	25	Nassir Little	F	Portland Trail Blazers	—
2020	1	15	15	Cole Anthony	G	Orlando Magic	—
2021	1	29	29	Day'Ron Sharpe	C	Phoenix Suns	—
2024	2	18	48	Harrison Ingram	F	San Antonio Spurs	—
2025	1	22	22	Drake Powell	F	Atlanta Hawks	—
2026	1	4	4	Caleb Wilson	F	Chicago Bulls	—

== Players selected in the BAA and ABA drafts ==
North Carolina Tar Heels selected in the BAA and ABA Drafts
Year	League	Round	Pick	Overall	Name	Position	Team	Notes
1948	BAA	—	—	—	Norman Kohler	G	Indianapolis Olympians	—
1948	BAA	—	—	—	Bob Paxton	F, C	Indianapolis Olympians	—
1948	BAA	—	—	—	Hook Dillon	F	Chicago Stags	—
1967	ABA	—	—	—	Bob Lewis	G	Anaheim Amigos	—
1968	ABA	—	—	—	Larry Miller	G, F	Los Angeles Stars	—
1969	ABA	—	—	—	Dick Gruber^{†}	G	Indiana Pacers	ABA Champion (1970)
1969	ABA	—	—	—	Bill Bunting	F, C	Miami Floridians	—
1969	ABA	—	—	—	Rusty Clark	C	Los Angeles Stars	—
1970	ABA	—	—	—	Charles Scott^{‡}	G	Virginia Squires	NBA All-Star (1973, 1974, 1975); ABA All-Star (1971, 1972); NBA Champion (1976); ABA Rookie of the Year (1971)
1971	ABA	—	—	—	Lee Dedmon	C	Utah Stars	—
1972	ABA	—	—	—	Dennis Wuycik	F	Carolina Cougars	—
1972	ABA	—	—	—	Bill Chamberlain	F	Carolina Cougars	—
1972	ABA	—	—	—	Steve Previs	G	Carolina Cougars	—
1973	ABA	—	—	—	Bobby Jones^{‡}	F	Carolina Cougars	ABA All-Star (1976); NBA All-Star (1977, 1978, 1981, 1982); NBA Champion (1983); NBA Sixth Man of the Year (1983)
1973	ABA	—	—	—	George Karl	G	Memphis Tams	—
1974	ABA	4	1	31	Darrell Elston	G	Carolina Cougars	—
