= Danny Lotz =

American basketball player

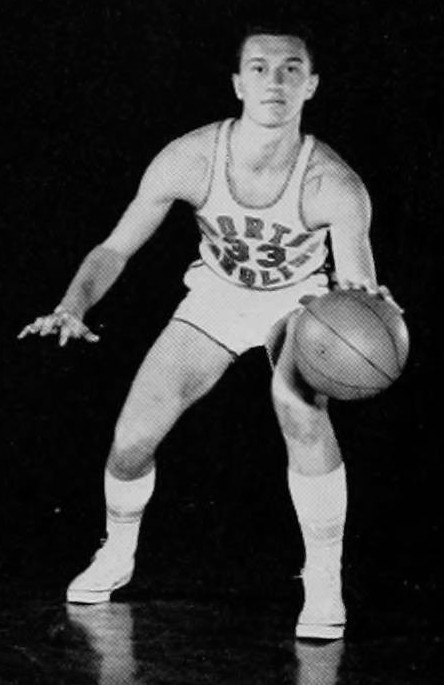
- Lotz in 1958

Personal information
- Born: March 30, 1937 Northport, New York, U.S.
- Died: August 19, 2015 (aged 78) Raleigh, North Carolina, U.S.
- Listed height: 6 ft 6 in (1.98 m)
- Listed weight: 230 lb (104 kg)

Career information
- High school: Northport High School (Northport, New York)
- College: North Carolina (1956–1959)
- Position: Forward

Career highlights
- NCAA champion (1957)

Daniel Milton Lotz (March 30, 1937 – August 19, 2015) was an American basketball player who was a member of the undefeated 1956–57 North Carolina Tar Heels men's basketball team. He was the son-in-law of evangelist Billy Graham.

== Early life ==
Lotz was a native of Northport, New York. His father, John Lotz, was a street preacher in New York City who held a weekly ministry at The Bowery Mission. He had three brothers, including basketball coach John Lotz and Baptist leader Denton Lotz. Lotz averaged 20 points per game as a junior and 28 as a senior at Northport High School. He was also a standout defensive end for the school's football team. He captained both teams to championships.

== University of North Carolina ==
Lotz was ready to sign with Wake Forest, but was eventually steered to North Carolina by recruiter Harry Gotkin. He was one of many New York players to join Frank McGuire's Tar Heels, including Lennie Rosenbluth, Pete Brennan, Tommy Kearns, Joe Quigg, and Bob Cunningham.

Lotz appeared in 24 games his sophomore year, averaging 1.0 points and 1.6 rebounds per game. UNC finished the year with a 32–0 record and Lotz picked up two rebounds in the Tar Heels' triple overtime victory in the 1957 NCAA University Division basketball championship game.

McGuire expected Lotz to be the team's sixth man during the 1957–58 season. However, Lotz was forced to miss several games after he broke his leg in the season-opener against Clemson. He finished the season averaging 1.0 points and 1.7 rebounds in 18 games played.

Lotz was the only senior on the 1958–59 North Carolina Tar Heels men's basketball team. He nearly did not make the team due to the excellent play of sophomores Doug Moe and York Larese. However, he made the squad and was named a team captain. He started the team's first several games, but was eventually moved to the bench. He finished the year averaging 3.0 points, 3.0 rebounds, and 0.4 assists per game and was awarded the Roy Roberson Jr. Memorial Trophy for "contributing most to the morale of the team".

After his basketball eligibility expired, Lotz earned a football scholarship and played for the North Carolina Tar Heels football team as a defensive end.

== Post-playing life ==
In 1963, Lotz graduated from the UNC School of Dentistry alongside former teammate Joe Quigg. He began practicing in Raleigh, North Carolina after a stint in the United States Air Force. He served for two years in the Air Force and became a captain. While in the Air Force, he was stationed at Holloman Air Force Base in New Mexico and played in the all service basketball team.

On September 2, 1966, Lotz married Anne Morrow Graham, daughter of evangelist Billy Graham. The pair had met at the annual Fellowship of Christian Athletes conference in Black Mountain, North Carolina in June 1965 when Graham was 17 and Lotz was 28. They had one son and two daughters. Lotz remained active with the FCA and taught Bible study.

Lotz developed diabetes at the age of 50 and lost sight in one eye and hearing in one ear. He also suffered from heart disease, which required five stents in his arteries, and kidney failure that resulted in dialysis treatments three times a week.

On August 17, 2015, Lotz's wife found him unresponsive in their pool. He was taken off of life support two days later and died that same day.
