= Frank McGuire =

American basketball coach (1913–1994)

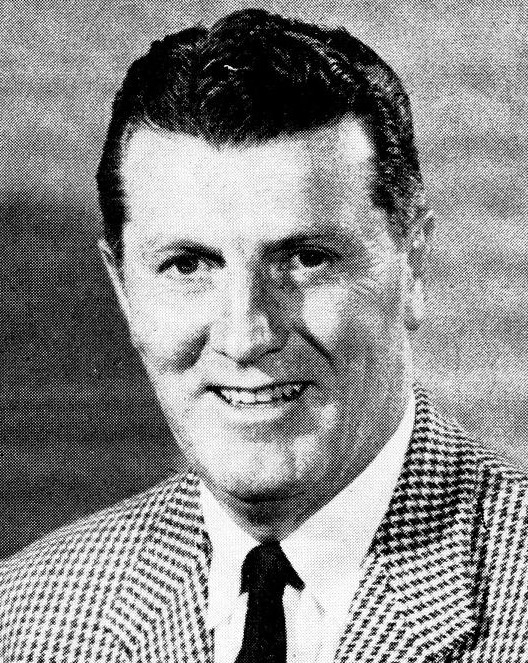

Biographical details
- Born: November 8, 1913; New York City, New York, U.S.
- Died: October 11, 1994 (aged 80); Columbia, South Carolina, U.S.

Playing career

Basketball
- 1933–1936: St. John's

Coaching career (HC unless noted)

Basketball
- 1947–1952: St. John's
- 1952–1961: North Carolina
- 1961–1962: Philadelphia Warriors
- 1964–1980: South Carolina

Baseball
- 1948–1952: St. John's

Head coaching record
- Overall: 549–236 (college basketball); 67–30 (college baseball)

Accomplishments and honors

Championships
- Basketball; NCAA University Division tournament (1957); 2 NCAA Regional—Final Four (1952, 1957); 6 ACC regular season (1956, 1957, 1959–1961, 1970); 2 ACC tournament (1957, 1971)

Awards
- Basketball; UPI Coach of the Year (1957); 2× ACC Coach of the Year (1957, 1969)
- Basketball Hall of Fame; Inducted in 1977
- College Basketball Hall of Fame; Inducted in 2006

Frank Joseph McGuire (November 8, 1913 – October 11, 1994) was an American basketball coach. At the collegiate level, he was head coach for three major programs: St. John's, North Carolina, and South Carolina, winning over a hundred games at each program.

== Early years ==
Born in New York City as the youngest of 13 children in an Irish-American family, to New York police officer, Robert McGuire and his wife, the former Anne Lynch (his father died when Frank was only two years old). He attended Xavier High School, graduating in 1933, McGuire graduated from St. John's University in 1936, playing under head coach James "Buck" Freeman. He served in the U.S. Navy during World War II, interrupting his work as a teacher and coach at his high school. Prior to 1947, he also played professional basketball briefly in the American Basketball League.

== Coaching career ==
=== St. John's ===
After Joe Lapchick left St. John's to coach the New York Knicks in 1947, McGuire became head basketball and baseball coach at his alma mater. He led the baseball team to the College World Series in 1949 and the basketball team to the Final Four in 1952, becoming one of only three coaches to achieve both accomplishments. Their appearance in the NCAA championship game in 1952 is still their only one in program history.

=== North Carolina ===
In 1952, McGuire left St. John's to become the basketball coach at the University of North Carolina. On paper, this was a significant step down from St. John's. UNC was not reckoned as a national power at the time. However, school officials wanted a big-name coach to counter the rise of rival North Carolina State under Everett Case. Additionally, McGuire wanted to move out of New York City, as caring for his intellectually disabled son in a small apartment was difficult.

Although McGuire had left New York City, he built around a core of players from in and around the area, including Lennie Rosenbluth, Joe Quigg, Tommy Kearns, Pete Brennan, Bob Cunningham, and Danny Lotz. In his first season, McGuire briefly led the Tar Heels to their first appearance in a major poll, for two weeks in January and February 1953. After two middling seasons in the newly formed Atlantic Coast Conference, McGuire first made an impact in 1955, when his Tar Heels routed then-#5 Alabama 99–77. It was UNC's first defeat of a nonconference opponent ranked in the top 10 of a major media poll. They went on to share the ACC regular season title with N.C. State. A year later, McGuire guided North Carolina to an undefeated 32–0 season in 1956–57, capped off by winning the NCAA championship game 54–53 in triple overtime against the Wilt Chamberlain-led Kansas Jayhawks.

In January 1961, the National Collegiate Athletic Association placed North Carolina on probation for a year after an investigation found that the school had paid for the lodging and meals of players' parents at the Dixie Classic and reimbursed McGuire and recruiter Harry Gotkin what appeared to be an excessive amount of money for recruiting expenses without providing itemized bills. The NCAA also reprimanded UNC for its poor accounting methods, which made it impossible to determine whether or not serious rule violations had taken place. Combined with rumors of point-shaving by some UNC players, this led Chancellor William Aycock to force McGuire's resignation after the season. At McGuire's suggestion, Aycock named McGuire's top assistant, Dean Smith, as the new coach.

=== Philadelphia Warriors ===
Soon after leaving North Carolina, McGuire became the head coach of the NBA's Philadelphia Warriors and coached Chamberlain during the Warriors' last season in the city. During this season, Chamberlain set his all-time record for scoring average in a season, of 50.4 points per game; additionally, this was the season in which Chamberlain scored 100 points in a single game. The team moved to San Francisco in 1962 and McGuire resigned rather than go west with the team.

=== South Carolina ===
Following his one season in the NBA, McGuire worked for two years in public relations in New York before returning to college basketball as head coach at the University of South Carolina in 1964. The Gamecocks achieved national prominence under McGuire in his sixth year, going undefeated in ACC play in 1970–one of only two times that an ACC team from the state of South Carolina has won a regular season title (the other being Clemson in 1990). The Gamecocks were denied an NCAA berth when they lost a controversial ACC championship game, in double overtime, to North Carolina State. In those days, only one team per conference was guaranteed a bid to the 25-team field. Ironically, the Gamecocks' home arena, Carolina Coliseum, hosted the NCAA East Regional that same year. The Gamecocks' 25 wins in 1970 were the most in school history until Frank Martin's 2016 team also won 25 games (Martin's 2017 Gamecocks broke the record, with 26 wins). McGuire's Gamecocks won the ACC tournament in 1971–to this day, the only ACC tourney title won by a school from the state of South Carolina.

The Gamecocks went independent in 1972, and McGuire would then go on to take the Gamecocks to three more NCAA Tournaments and two National Invitation Tournaments before being forced into retirement after the 1979–80 season. His 283 wins are by far the most in school history. The playing surface at the Gamecocks' former arena, Carolina Coliseum, is named Frank McGuire Arena in his honor. He is also an honorary brother of the Alpha Eta chapter of Phi Kappa Sigma at the University of South Carolina.

== Legacy ==
McGuire holds the record for most victories in a season without a loss, together with Bob Knight of the 1975–76 Indiana Hoosiers basketball team, at 32–0.

He achieved the number one ranking with both the University of North Carolina and South Carolina, and is one of five coaches--John Calipari, Larry Brown, Roy Williams and Rick Pitino are the others—to take two different schools to the NCAA Finals. He is one of 17 coaches, as of 2025, to take multiple schools to the Final Four. The others are: Roy Williams, Lute Olson, Jack Gardner, Forddy Anderson, Larry Brown, Eddie Sutton, John Calipari, Rick Pitino, Gene Bartow, Hugh Durham, Lou Henson, Bob Huggins, Kelvin Sampson, Lon Kruger, Jim Larrañaga, and Lee Rose.

McGuire was famous for using his New York City ties to enlist players to come south to play at UNC and USC, and was known as one of the top recruiters in the sport, frequently joking about how successful his New York City players, many of them Jewish and Catholic, were in Baptist-prevalent North Carolina and South Carolina. McGuire recruited so many New York City players to UNC and USC that the talent pipeline from NYC to the Carolinas was commonly referred to as the McGuire NYC Underground Railroad.

Players that he coached or successfully recruited at the two schools include Lennie Rosenbluth (UNC), Larry Brown (UNC), Donnie Walsh (UNC), Doug Moe (UNC), Billy Cunningham (UNC), Bobby Cremins (USC), John Roche (USC), Tom Owens (USC), Tom Riker (USC), Kevin Joyce (USC), Brian Winters (USC), Mike Dunleavy, Sr. (USC) and Alex English (USC).

After having been the first coach to take two different schools to the finals of the NCAA basketball tournament, in 1971 he became the second coach – joining Eddie Hickey – to take three different schools to the NCAA tournament. McGuire was elected to the Naismith Memorial Basketball Hall of Fame in 1977, and retired in 1980.

He is the winningest coach in South Carolina history, and is still the third-winningest coach in North Carolina history. He died in Columbia, South Carolina.

He is not related to Marquette coach Al McGuire, who was a coaching contemporary of his. However, he did coach both Al and his brother Dick McGuire at St. John's. Members of his coaching tree include Al and Dick McGuire, Bobby Cremins, Dean Smith, Doug Moe, Donnie Walsh, Lou Carnesecca, Larry Brown, Billy Cunningham, and George Felton.

== Head coaching record ==
=== NBA ===
Team	Year	G	W	L	W–L%	Finish	PG	PW	PL	PW–L%	Result
Philadelphia	1961–62	80	49	31	.613	7th in Pacific	12	6	6	.500	Lost in division finals
Career		80	49	31	.613		12	6	6	.500	

=== College basketball ===
Record table
Season	Team	Overall	Conference	Standing	Postseason
St. John's Redmen (Metropolitan New York Conference) (1947–1952)
1947–48	St. John's	12–11	3–3	T–4th	
1948–49	St. John's	15–9	5–1	T–1st	NIT First Round
1949–50	St. John's	24–5	3–3	T–3rd	NIT Third Place
1950–51	St. John's	26–5	6–0	1st	NCAA Regional Third Place / NIT Third Place
1951–52	St. John's	25–6	6–0	1st	NCAA Runner-up / NIT Quarterfinal
St. John's:		102–36	23–7		
North Carolina Tar Heels (Southern Conference) (1952–1953)
1952–53	North Carolina	17–10	15–6	8th	
North Carolina Tar Heels (Atlantic Coast Conference) (1953–1961)
1953–54	North Carolina	11–10	5–6	5th	
1954–55	North Carolina	10–11	8–6	T–4th	
1955–56	North Carolina	18–5	11–3	T–1st	
1956–57	North Carolina	32–0	14–0	1st	NCAA University Division champion
1957–58	North Carolina	19–7	10–4	T–2nd	
1958–59	North Carolina	20–5	12–2	T–1st	NCAA University Division First Round
1959–60	North Carolina	18–6	12–2	T–1st	
1960–61	North Carolina	19–4	12–2	1st	
North Carolina:		164–58	99–31		
South Carolina Gamecocks (Atlantic Coast Conference) (1964–1971)
1964–65	South Carolina	6–17	2–12	8th	
1965–66	South Carolina	11–13	4–10	T–6th	
1966–67	South Carolina	16–7	8–4	3rd	
1967–68	South Carolina	15–7	9–5	T–3rd	
1968–69	South Carolina	21–7	11–3	2nd	NIT Quarterfinal
1969–70	South Carolina	25–3	14–0	1st	
1970–71	South Carolina	23–6	10–4	2nd	NCAA University Division Sweet 16
South Carolina Gamecocks (Independent) (1971–1980)
1971–72	South Carolina	24–5			NCAA University Division Sweet 16
1972–73	South Carolina	22–7			NCAA University Division Sweet 16
1973–74	South Carolina	22–5			NCAA Division I First Round
1974–75	South Carolina	19–9			NIT Quarterfinal
1975–76	South Carolina	18–9			
1976–77	South Carolina	14–12			
1977–78	South Carolina	16–12			NIT First Round
1978–79	South Carolina	15–12			
1979–80	South Carolina	16–11			
South Carolina:		283–142	58–38		
Total:		549–236			
National champion Postseason invitational champion Conference regular season champion Conference regular season and conference tournament champion Division regular season champion Division regular season and conference tournament champion Conference tournament champion

=== College baseball ===
Record table
Season	Team	Overall	Conference	Standing	Postseason
St. John's Redmen () (1948–1952)
1948	St. John's	9–5			
1949	St. John's	21–6			College World Series
1950	St. John's	13–5			
1951	St. John's	9–10			
1952	St. John's	15–4			
St. John's:		67–25			
Total:		67–25			
National champion Postseason invitational champion Conference regular season champion Conference regular season and conference tournament champion Division regular season champion Division regular season and conference tournament champion Conference tournament champion

== See also ==
- List of NCAA Division I Men's Final Four appearances by coach
