= John Lotz =

American college basketball player and coach

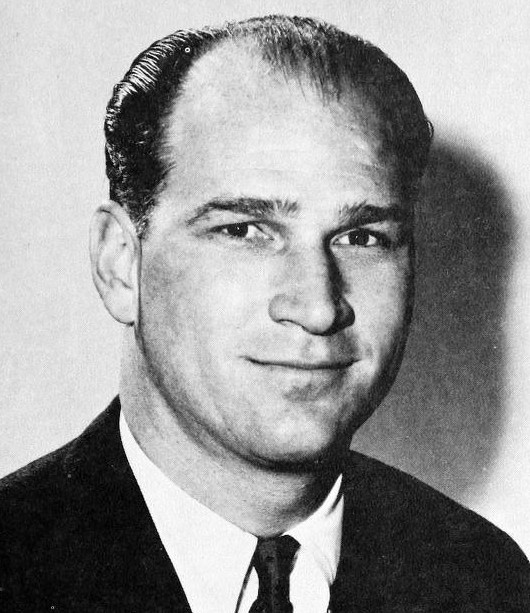
- Lotz, circa 1966

Biographical details
- Born: July 17, 1935; Flushing, New York, U.S.
- Died: May 5, 2001 (aged 65); Chapel Hill, North Carolina, U.S.

Playing career
- ?: Baylor
- ?: East Texas State

Coaching career (HC unless noted)
- 1965–1973: North Carolina (assistant)
- 1973–1980: Florida

Head coaching record
- Overall: 83–88 (.485)

Accomplishments and honors

Awards
- FCA National Coach of the Year (1977)

John Lotz (July 17, 1935 – May 5, 2001) was an American college basketball player and coach. Lotz was best known as the head coach of the Florida Gators men's basketball team, and as a long-time assistant under coach Dean Smith of the North Carolina Tar Heels men's basketball team.

== Personal life ==
Lotz was the son of a Baptist minister from New York City. He had three brothers, including UNC basketball player Danny Lotz and minister Denton Lotz. Danny Lotz was the husband of Anne Graham Lotz, daughter of Billy Graham.

== Playing career ==
Lotz attended Baylor University in Waco, Texas, where he played for the Baylor Bears basketball team. He later transferred to East Texas State College (now known as Texas A&M University–Commerce) in Commerce, Texas, where he earned his bachelor's and master's degrees.

== Coaching career ==
He began his coaching career at high schools in Norwich and Massapequa, New York before moving up to the college level.

Lotz served as an assistant coach for the North Carolina Tar Heels men's basketball team of the University of North Carolina in Chapel Hill, North Carolina under head coach Dean Smith from 1965 to 1973. During his eight seasons with Smith's Tar Heels, the team made four appearances in the Final Four of the NCAA Tournament.

Lotz was the head coach of the men's basketball team at the University of Florida in Gainesville from 1973 to 1980. Lotz's 1976–1977 Gators finished 17–9 overall, and 10–8 and in fourth place in the Southeastern Conference (SEC). That was his only winning record in conference play. Following a 4–7 start to the 1979–80 season (including 1–3 in conference play), Lotz was fired. He finished his seven-year tenure as the Florida Gators' head coach with an overall record of 83–88 and 46–66 in the SEC.

== Life after basketball ==
After his coaching career ended in 1980, Lotz returned to the University of North Carolina as an assistant athletic director and he directed the community outreach program. He involved hundreds of North Carolina student-athletes in various volunteer projects, including the Thanksgiving food drive for underprivileged families, the Juvenile Diabetes Walkathon, and clothing collections for the needy. Lotz received the Governor's Award for Excellence for Crime Prevention in recognition of his work with youth in Chapel Hill and Carrboro.

Lotz died in Chapel Hill on May 5, 2001, after a brief fight with a malignant brain tumor; he was 64 years old. He was survived by his wife Vicki and their two daughters. The Fellowship of Christian Athletes (FCA) inducted Lotz into its "Hall of Champions" in 2001. In 2003, the FCA established its annual John Lotz Barnabas Award to "honor a basketball coach who best exhibits a commitment to Christ, integrity, encouragement to others and lives a balanced life"; past winners include John Wooden and Steve Alford. The Chapel Hill Police Department named its summer basketball camp in Lotz's honor.

== Head coaching record ==
=== Men's basketball ===
Record table
Season	Team	Overall	Conference	Standing	Postseason
Florida Gators (Southeastern Conference) (1973–1980)
1973–74	Florida	15–11	9–9	5th	
1974–75	Florida	12–16	8–10	6th	
1975–76	Florida	12–14	7–11	6th	
1976–77	Florida	17–9	10–8	4th	
1977–78	Florida	15–12	8–10	6th	
1978–79	Florida	8–19	3–15	10th	
1979–80	Florida	4–7	1–3		
Florida:		83–88	46–66		
Total:		83–88			
National champion Postseason invitational champion Conference regular season champion Conference regular season and conference tournament champion Division regular season champion Division regular season and conference tournament champion Conference tournament champion

== See also ==
- Florida Gators
- List of Texas A&M–Commerce alumni
- North Carolina Tar Heels

== Bibliography ==
- Koss, Bill, Pond Birds: Gator Basketball, The Whole Story From The Inside, Fast Break Press, Gainesville, Florida (1996). ISBN 978-0-8130-1523-1.
