= 1958 NCAA Men's Basketball All-Americans =

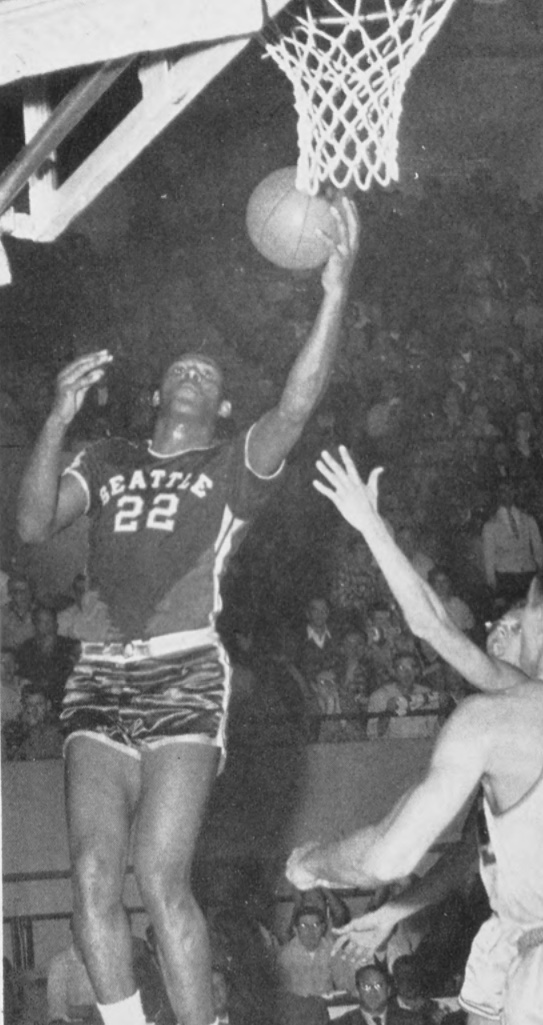
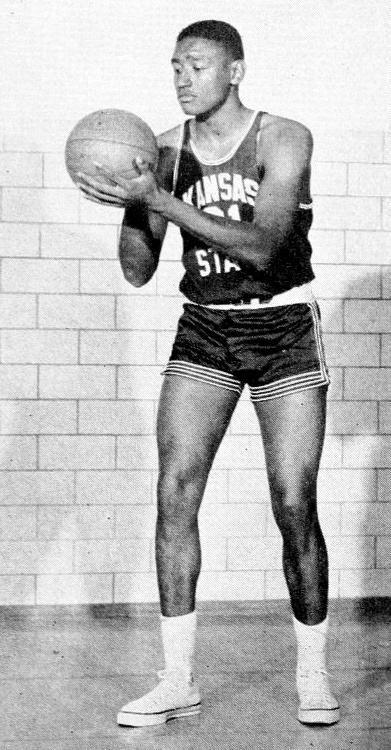
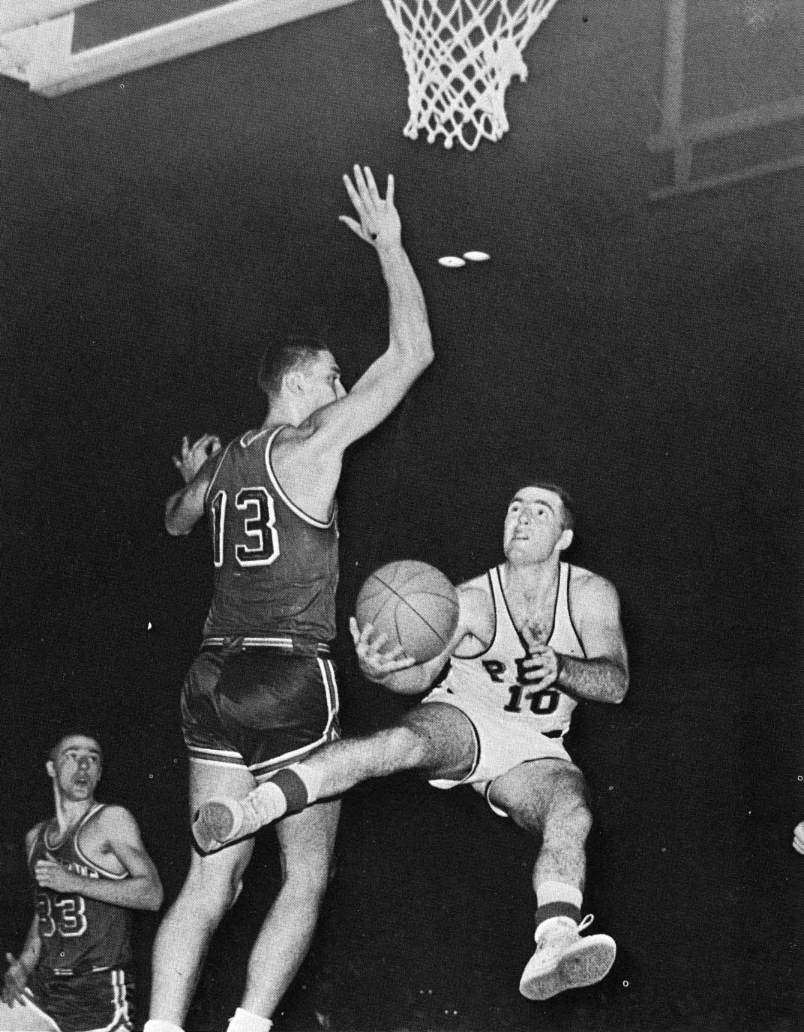
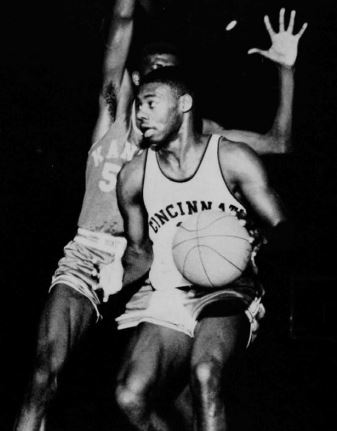
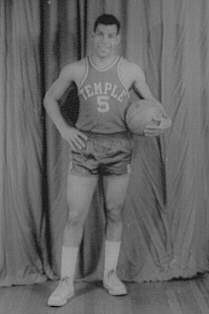
- Members of the 1958 consensus first team. Clockwise from top left: Baylor, Boozer, Hennon, Rodgers, Robertson. Not pictured: Chamberlain.
- Awarded for: 1957–58 NCAA University Division men's basketball season

The consensus 1958 College Basketball All-American team, as determined by aggregating the results of six major All-American teams. To earn "consensus" status, a player must win honors from a majority of the following teams: the Associated Press, the USBWA, The United Press International, the National Association of Basketball Coaches, the Newspaper Enterprise Association (NEA), and the International News Service.

== 1958 Consensus All-America team ==
Consensus First Team
Player	Position	Class	Team
Elgin Baylor	F	Junior	Seattle
Bob Boozer	F	Junior	Kansas State
Wilt Chamberlain	C	Junior	Kansas
Don Hennon	G	Junior	Pittsburgh
Oscar Robertson	G	Sophomore	Cincinnati
Guy Rodgers	G	Senior	Temple

Consensus Second Team
Player	Position	Class	Team
Pete Brennan	F	Senior	North Carolina
Archie Dees	F/C	Senior	Indiana
Mike Farmer	F	Senior	San Francisco
Dave Gambee	F	Senior	Oregon State
Bailey Howell	F	Junior	Mississippi State

== Individual All-America teams ==
All-America Team
All-America Team	First team		Second team		Third team	
All-America Team	Player	School	Player	School	Player	School
Associated Press	Elgin Baylor	Seattle	Bob Boozer	Kansas State	Mike Farmer	San Francisco
Associated Press	Wilt Chamberlain	Kansas	Pete Brennan	North Carolina	Johnny Green	Michigan State
Associated Press	Don Hennon	Pittsburgh	Archie Dees	Indiana	Tom Hawkins	Notre Dame
Associated Press	Oscar Robertson	Cincinnati	Bailey Howell	Mississippi State	Tommy Kearns	North Carolina
Associated Press	Guy Rodgers	Temple	Lloyd Sharrar	West Virginia	Jerry West	West Virginia
USBWA/Look Magazine	Elgin Baylor	Seattle	No second or third teams (10-man first team)			
USBWA/Look Magazine	Bob Boozer	Kansas State	No second or third teams (10-man first team)			
USBWA/Look Magazine	Pete Brennan	North Carolina	No second or third teams (10-man first team)			
USBWA/Look Magazine	Wilt Chamberlain	Kansas	No second or third teams (10-man first team)			
USBWA/Look Magazine	Archie Dees	Indiana	No second or third teams (10-man first team)			
USBWA/Look Magazine	Mike Farmer	San Francisco	No second or third teams (10-man first team)			
USBWA/Look Magazine	Don Hennon	Pittsburgh	No second or third teams (10-man first team)			
USBWA/Look Magazine	Bailey Howell	Mississippi State	No second or third teams (10-man first team)			
USBWA/Look Magazine	Oscar Robertson	Cincinnati	No second or third teams (10-man first team)			
USBWA/Look Magazine	Guy Rodgers	Temple	No second or third teams (10-man first team)			
NABC	Elgin Baylor	Seattle	Archie Dees	Indiana	Pete Brennan	North Carolina
NABC	Bob Boozer	Kansas State	Mike Farmer	San Francisco	Gene Brown	San Francisco
NABC	Wilt Chamberlain	Kansas	Johnny Green	Michigan State	Bailey Howell	Mississippi State
NABC	Oscar Robertson	Cincinnati	Tom Hawkins	Notre Dame	Jack Parr	Kansas State
NABC	Guy Rodgers	Temple	Don Hennon	Pittsburgh	Lloyd Sharrar	West Virginia
UPI	Elgin Baylor	Seattle	Bob Boozer	Kansas State	Pete Brennan	North Carolina
UPI	Wilt Chamberlain	Kansas	Archie Dees	Indiana	Johnny Green	Michigan State
UPI	Don Hennon	Pittsburgh	Mike Farmer	San Francisco	Bailey Howell	Mississippi State
UPI	Oscar Robertson	Cincinnati	Dave Gambee	Oregon State	Lloyd Sharrar	West Virginia
UPI	Guy Rodgers	Temple	Tom Hawkins	Notre Dame	Jerry West	West Virginia
NEA	Elgin Baylor	Seattle	Connie Dierking	Cincinnati	No third team	
NEA	Wilt Chamberlain	Kansas	Mike Farmer	San Francisco	No third team	
NEA	Archie Dees	Indiana	Dave Gambee	Oregon State	No third team	
NEA	Oscar Robertson	Cincinnati	Frank Howard	Ohio State	No third team	
NEA	Guy Rodgers	Temple	Jimmy Smith	Steubenville	No third team	
International News Service	Elgin Baylor	Seattle	Bob Boozer	Kansas State	No third team	
International News Service	Wilt Chamberlain	Kansas	Pete Brennan	North Carolina	No third team	
International News Service	Tom Hawkins	Notre Dame	Mike Farmer	San Francisco	No third team	
International News Service	Oscar Robertson	Cincinnati	Johnny Green	Michigan State	No third team	
International News Service	Guy Rodgers	Temple	Don Hennon	Pittsburgh	No third team	

AP Honorable Mention:

- Bucky Allen, Duke
- Gene Brown, San Francisco
- Leo Byrd, Marshall
- Barney Cable, Bradley
- Boo Ellis, Niagara
- Wayne Embry, Miami (OH)
- Dom Flora, Washington and Lee
- Dave Gambee, Oregon State
- Hal Greer, Marshall
- Fred Grim, Arkansas
- Vernon Hatton, Kentucky
- Joe Hobbs, Florida
- Frank Howard, Ohio State
- Jack Kubiszyn, Alabama
- Red Murrell, Drake
- Jack Parr, Kansas State
- Hub Reed, Oklahoma City
- Earl Robinson, California
- Gary Simmons, Idaho
- Doug Smart, Washington
- Tony Windis, Wyoming

== See also ==
- 1957–58 NCAA University Division men's basketball season
