= Denton Lotz =

American theologian (1939–2019)

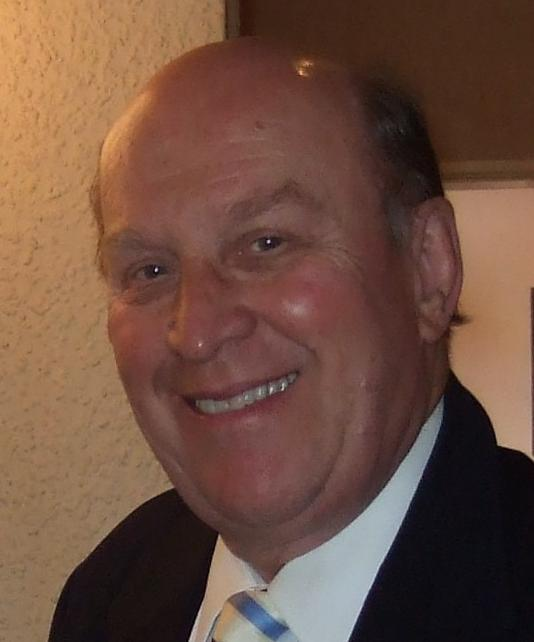
- Born: January 18, 1939; U.S.
- Died: April 23, 2019 (aged 80)
- Occupations: Pastor, General secretary of the Baptist World Alliance

Denton Lotz (January 18, 1939 – April 23, 2019) was the general secretary of the Baptist World Alliance from 1988 to 2007 and the senior pastor of Tremont Temple Baptist Church in Boston from 2007 to 2017.

== Biography ==
Lotz was the son of a Baptist minister from New York City. He had three brothers, including basketball coach John Lotz and basketball player Danny Lotz. Danny Lotz was the husband of Anne Graham Lotz, daughter of Billy Graham.

Lotz held a bachelor of sacred theology degree from Harvard Divinity School and a doctor of theology degree from the University of Hamburg. He was married to Janice Lotz.

=== Ministry ===
In 1988, he became the general secretary of the Baptist World Alliance until 2007. In 2007, he became the senior pastor of Tremont Temple Baptist Church in Boston until 2017.
