= Joe Quigg =

American basketball player

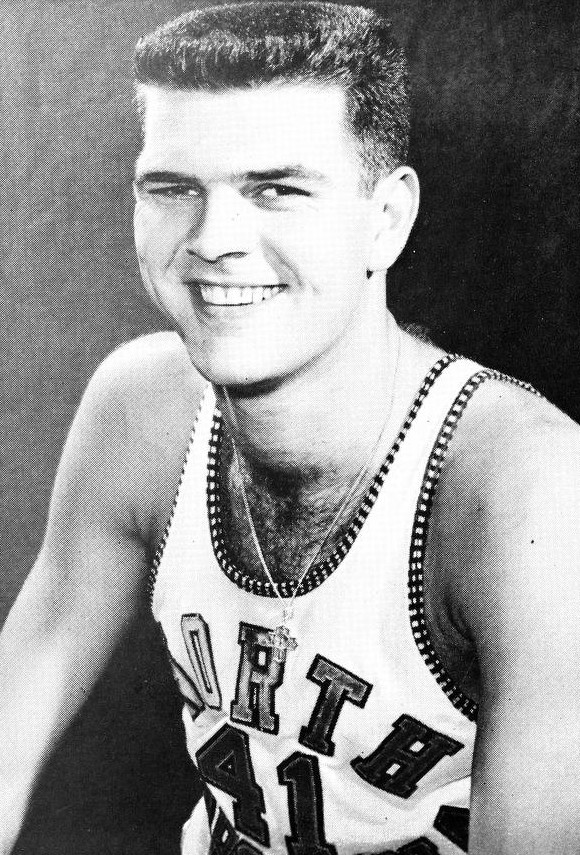

Personal information
- Born: c. 1936 Brooklyn, New York, U.S.
- Listed height: 6 ft 9 in (2.06 m)
- Listed weight: 205 lb (93 kg)

Career information
- High school: St. Francis Prep (Queens, New York)
- College: North Carolina (1955–1957)
- NBA draft: 1958: 2nd round, 11th overall pick
- Drafted by: New York Knicks
- Position: Center
- Number: 41

Career highlights
- NCAA champion (1957)
- Stats at Basketball Reference

Joe Quigg is an American former basketball player. He was a key player on the 1957 National Champion North Carolina Tar Heels and a second round draft pick by the New York Knicks in 1958.

Quigg stood 6 feet 9 inches tall and played the center position at St. Francis Prep in New York City. He came to the University of North Carolina through coach Frank McGuire's "underground railroad" of players from New York to Chapel Hill along with the likes of Pete Brennan, Tommy Kearns, Danny Lotz, and Lennie Rosenbluth.

Quigg was a two-year starter; for the 1955–56 and 1956–57 seasons. Quigg averaged 12.0 points and 9.0 rebounds per game as a sophomore, then 10.3 points and 8.6 rebounds per game as a junior. The Tar Heels went undefeated in his junior season and won the national championship. Quigg was instrumental in the championship game win, one of the greatest games in history. Quigg made the game-winning free throws and knocked down a pass to 7 feet 1 inch tall Kansas center Wilt Chamberlain in the closing seconds of the 54–53, triple-overtime win.

Quigg was primed for a strong senior year in 1957–58, as the Tar Heels returned a strong nucleus from their championship team. However, he was injured in a preseason scrimmage and was out the entire season with a broken leg.

Even after missing his entire senior season, the New York Knicks spent a second-round pick (#11 overall) on Quigg in the 1958 NBA draft. Not fully healed, Quigg did not make the team. Instead, Joe Quigg went to dental school and became a dentist.
