= Maurice King (basketball) =

American professional basketball player

Personal information
- Born: December 1, 1934 Kansas City, Missouri, U.S.
- Died: September 17, 2007 (aged 72) Kansas City, Missouri, U.S.
- Listed height: 6 ft 2 in (1.88 m)
- Listed weight: 195 lb (88 kg)

Career information
- High school: R. T. Coles (Kansas City, Missouri)
- College: Kansas (1954–1957)
- NBA draft: 1957: 6th round, 48th overall pick
- Drafted by: Boston Celtics
- Playing career: 1959–1963
- Position: Point guard
- Number: 19, 22

Career history
- 1959: Boston Celtics
- 1959–1960: Baltimore Bullets
- 1961–1963: Kansas City Steers
- 1963: Chicago Zephyrs

Career NBA statistics
- Points: 226
- Rebounds: 106
- Assists: 44
- Stats at NBA.com
- Stats at Basketball Reference

Maurice E. King (December 1, 1934 – September 17, 2007) was an American professional basketball player who played for the NBA champion Boston Celtics in the 1959–60 season.

== Early life ==
King was born in Kansas City, Missouri and graduated from R. T. Coles High School in Kansas City, Missouri in 1953. King led the R. T. Coles Jeeps to a Missouri state high school basketball championship in 1952 and a second-place finish in 1953.

King's stellar play earned him a basketball scholarship from the University of Kansas that commenced with the 1953–54 school year.

King was the second black basketball player to play at Kansas (and first black starter), following LaVannes Squires from Wichita East High School in Wichita, Kansas and preceding Wilt Chamberlain, who was the third.

== College career ==
After redshirting his first season at Kansas due to the freshmen eligibility rules in effect at the time, King played a reserve role in his sophomore season for the Kansas Jayhawks during the 1954–55 season in which Kansas finished with an 11–10 record and 5th place in the Big 7 Conference.

Earning a starting position as a junior in 1955–56, King earned All-Big Seven honors for that season as KU's scoring leader averaging 14.0 points per game. The 1955–56 season, which Kansas finished with a 14–9 record and 5th place in the Big 7 Conference, was Wilt Chamberlain's freshman year in which Chamberlain was forced to redshirt due to NCAA rules in place at the time. As the only other black player on the Kansas team, King was a valuable friend and mentor to Chamberlain as they became fraternity brothers at Kappa Alpha Psi, Mu chapter.

In 1956–57, King's senior year, Chamberlain joined the Kansas Jayhawk varsity squad as a sophomore and led the team in scoring (29.6 points per game) and rebounding (18.8 rebounds per game). King remained a starter for the Jayhawks team and was a key contributor for the Jayhawks scoring 9.7 points per game.

The Jayhawks were ranked #1 or #2 in the Associated Press and U.P.I. polls the entire 1956–57 season, and advanced to the 1957 NCAA tournament as champion of the Big 7 Conference in its last season before it became the Big 8 Conference. The Jayhawks then defeated Southern Methodist University and Oklahoma City University in the Midwest Regional that was held at SMU Coliseum in Dallas, Texas to advance to the 1957 Final 4. King's stellar play landed him on the 1957 Midwest Regional all-tournament team.

In the 1957 Final 4, Kansas defeated University of San Francisco in the semi-final by the score of 80–56. The Jayhawks then lost to University of North Carolina by the score of 54–53 in triple overtime in the iconic 1957 NCAA title game at Municipal Auditorium in Kansas City, Missouri. King was second on the Jayhawks behind Chamberlain in both scoring (11 points) and rebounds (5 rebounds) in the title game.

== Professional career ==
After his senior season at Kansas, King was selected by the Boston Celtics with the 48th pick in the 6th round of the 1957 NBA draft. However, instead of joining the Celtics at that time, King served a two-year stint in the U.S. Army. Upon leaving the Army after his two-year commitment in 1959, King joined the Boston Celtics and played one game in the 1959–60 season. Later that season, the Celtics won the 1960 NBA title earning King an NBA championship recognition.

Immediately after his stint with the Celtics during the 1959–60 season, King joined the Baltimore Bullets in the Eastern Professional Basketball League for the remainder of the season.

On August 2, 1960, the St. Louis Hawks signed King to a training camp contract. King played for the Hawks in the 1960 pre-season but did not play in any regular-season games in the 1960–61 NBA season.

Prior to the 1961–62 season, King joined the fledgling Kansas City Steers of the American Basketball League (ABL).

In the ABL's inaugural season, King averaged 7.8 points per game, and led the team with an average of 3.2 assists. In Kansas City's second season in 1962–63, King averaged 14.7 points and 5.7 assists before the ABL folded on December 31, 1962.

Upon the folding of the ABL, King immediately signed with the Chicago Zephyrs of the NBA, and played in 37 games in the 1962–63 NBA season, averaging 5.8 points and 3.8 assists.

== Post-playing career ==
After leaving the NBA after the 1963 season, King went on to a career with the Kansas City Kansas Public Schools. Later, King had a long career as a personnel manager for Hallmark Cards.

After his playing career ended, King remained active as a supporter of the University of Kansas athletic program. He served on coaching search committees that hired football coach Mike Gottfried in 1982, basketball coach Larry Brown in 1983, athletic director Bob Frederick in 1987, football coach Glen Mason in 1987, and basketball coach Roy Williams in 1988.

King also served on the Jackson County, Missouri Parks and Recreation Advisory Board.

== Personal life ==
King had four children: Yasmin Brown, Calvin Wainright, Maurice King III, and Kimberly King-Crawford. Two of King's grandsons, Ish Wainright and Amaad Wainright, also played college basketball.

During his career at Baylor, Ish Wainright played in four NCAA tournaments, including advancing to the Sweet Sixteen in 2014 and 2017. In one game he played for Baylor against Kansas, he honored his father's legacy by having his name be called Ishmail King-Wainright instead of just Ishmail Wainright. Wainright also played college football for one season in Baylor as a tight end, to the point where he once joined the Buffalo Bills of the NFL under their training camp roster after graduating from Baylor. Ishmail previously played for the Phoenix Suns and Portland Trail Blazers in the NBA for three seasons from 2021 until 2024; he is currently playing for the Hapoel Tel Aviv B.C. in Israel. He has also played for the Uganda men's national basketball team for events like the FIBA AfroBasket 2021.

Amaad Wainright previously played college basketball for Trinity Valley Community College before transferring to Kansas State University starting in their 2017–18 season. During that specific season, Wainright and Kansas State made it to the 2018 NCAA tournament, going as far as the Elite 8 in their tournament run that season. However, he transferred out of Kansas State the following season, joining the LSU–Shreveport Pilots basketball team for his final two years in college.

== Career statistics ==
=== Regular season ===
Legend
GP	Games played	GS	Games started	MPG	Minutes per game
FG%	Field goal percentage	3P%	3-point field goal percentage	FT%	Free throw percentage
RPG	Rebounds per game	APG	Assists per game	SPG	Steals per game
BPG	Blocks per game	PPG	Points per game	**Bold**	Career high
†	Won an NBA championship	*	Led the league

†	Denotes seasons in which King's team won an ABL championship

Year	Team	GP	GS	MPG	FG%	3P%	FT%	RPG	APG	SPG	BPG	PPG
1959–60	Boston Celtics	1	–	19.0	**.625**	–	.000	4.0	2.0	–	–	10.0
1961–62	Kansas City Steers (ABL)	**78**	–	27.0	.386	**.386**	.814	2.6	3.2	–	–	7.8
1962–63†	Kansas City Steers (ABL)	31	–	**40.2**	.390	.306	.781	**4.5**	**5.7***	–	–	**14.7**
1962–63	Chicago Zephyrs	37	–	25.8	.390	–	**.824**	2.8	3.8	–	–	5.8
Career		147	–	29.2	.393	.344	.800	3.1	3.9	–	–	8.8

=== Playoffs ===
Year	Team	GP	GS	MPG	FG%	3P%	FT%	RPG	APG	SPG	BPG	PPG
1961–62	Kansas City Steers (ABL)	**5**	–	**34.6**	**.385**	**.167**	**.750**	**2.8**	**2.6**	–	–	**9.0**
Career		5	–	34.6	.385	.167	.750	2.8	2.6	–	–	9.0

== See also ==
- List of second-generation National Basketball Association players
