= Half-court shot =

Long-range basketball shot taken from beyond the half-court line

Nikola Jokić makes 3/4 court shot on January 23, 2025

A half-court shot is a long-range basketball shot generally taken from the half-court line or beyond. Some sports web sites define such shots as "Heaves". Shots from beyond half-court are the lowest percentage shot in basketball, and usually attempted only in the last seconds before the end of a quarter. In the National Basketball Association (NBA) they are only successful about 2.4% of the time, compared to all field goal attempts (47%) and three-point attempts (37%).

An NBA game court is 94 feet (29 m) long making the distance from half court to each baseline 47 feet (14 m). However the distance of a shot taken from exactly half court is just under 42 feet (13 m), because the rim is approximately five feet inside the baseline. The longest made shot in NBA history is Baron Davis's 89 feet (27 m) shot with 0.7 seconds remaining in the third quarter, on February 17, 2001, while playing for the Charlotte Hornets.

Collectively, NBA players try shots from beyond half-court a few hundred times each season. In some instances, NBA players will intentionally avoid shooting a half-court shot before the buzzer, or wait until just after the buzzer sounds before attempting it. Such players may be more interested in protecting their field goal percentage than providing an opportunity (though unlikely) for the team to acquire 3 more points. Since field goal percentage is accounted for during contract negotiations, some players think it is an intelligent business decision to refuse to toss a low percentage shot at the rim. As a result, some believe that half-court shots should not be included in the field goal percentage. Under a new rule starting in the 2025–26 NBA season, on plays beginning in the backcourt, missed shots taken 36 feet (11 m) or further from the rim with 3 seconds or fewer remaining in the first three quarters of a game officially count as a team shot attempt, and no longer affect individual player statistics. Early in the season, analysts noted that players were making substantially more "heave" attempts than they had at the same time the year prior.

The record for most half-court shots made in a single NBA season (by all NBA players combined) was set in the 2014 and 2016 seasons, each year having 16. Baron Davis is the only player to have hit a shot from at least 85 feet (26 m) in a game; since the year 2000, it has been attempted at least a total of 40 times. During his career, Baron Davis went 2-for-43 from beyond half court. Based on official NBA court dimensions, the player with the most half-court shots made in NBA history (minimum shot distance of 47 feet) is Stephen Curry, with 7. Nikola Jokić holds the record for the most heave attempts by a player in a season, attempting 22 shots in the 2024-25 season, and making two of them. Jokić has been described as "one of the few NBA players who disregards his traditional shooting percentages in the name of launching end-of-quarter heaves pretty much any chance he gets."

== Notable half-court shots ==
- Jerry West, a player whose silhouette became the logo of the NBA a year earlier, hit a 60 ft shot at the end of regulation for the Lakers in Game 3 of the 1970 NBA Finals, tying the game and sending it to overtime. Despite this, the Knicks would eventually win that game, and the series.
- NBA legend and basketball hall of fame member Moses Malone notably made a half-court shot during the last game of his career when his San Antonio Spurs faced the Charlotte Hornets in 1995.
- During the 1999 WNBA Championship, which was played in a best of three games format, the New York Liberty trailed the Houston Comets one game to zero heading to Houston for game 2 and, if necessary, game 3. Trailing 68–66 with only 2.4 seconds left in the game, New York's Teresa Weatherspoon received the ball about 50 feet (15 m) away from her team's basket, launched it and made it to give the Liberty a 69–68 win and force a decisive game 3. Houston ultimately won the series, but the play, which has become known as "The Shot", was named the best moment in WNBA playoff history by ESPN.
- On January 22, 2010, during a winter sports pep rally, students of Olathe Northwest High School wanted to play a prank on coach Joel Branstrom, a former University of Kansas walk-on, and promised him tickets of the Final Four game if he scores a shot from half-court while blindfolded – the catch was that the crowd was instructed to cheer regardless whether he scored the shot or not. Branstrom did, however, score the shot. The students didn't have any tickets to offer. It was widely reported in the media; while filming a teaser for WDAF-TV, reporter Rob Low jokingly attempted to recreate the shot by standing in the same court with his back to the hoop and throwing the ball – he also scored the shot, much to the surprise of himself and his film crew. A clip of the shot and their responses later went viral on YouTube. According to Low, when he later interviewed Branstrom, and asked him to repeat the blindfolded feat, he, again, scored it. Branstrom attended the 2010 NCAA men's Final Four as a guest of the NCAA.
- Vince Carter entered The Guinness Book of World Records for hitting an 86-foot (26 m) shot while sitting down in a video published in February 2010. A week earlier, Dwight Howard set the record by making the shot at 52 feet 6 inches (16.00 m).
- The current record holder for most half-court shots in a minute is Green Bay point guard Eric Valentin, with eight shots scored in 60 seconds during an attempt in January 2011; the eighth completion was his last shot of nineteen attempts. Another player named Adam Beatrice has released a video of him making ten half-court shots in a minute, though this has not been acknowledged by Guinness.
- At the 2012 Olympic games, Australia's Belinda Snell sank a half-court launch with less than one second on the clock against France to send the game into overtime.
- In November 2013, the Harlem Globetrotters' Thunder Law set the Guinness World Record for longest basketball shot at 109 feet 9 inches (33.45 m). He also holds the record for longest backward shot at 82 feet 2 inches (25.04 m).
- During a half-court shooting contest in the 2014 West All-Star Game Practice, Stephen Curry hit three half-court shots in a row.
- In October 2014, during an out-of-game competition, Fresno State's guard Cezar Guerrero made five consecutive half-court shots.
- In October 2014, Gonzaga's Kyle Wiltjer set the record for the farthest behind-the-back shot, which he made at half-court. Previously, The Guinness Book of World Records recognized Kenneth Sorvang of Norway with the farthest behind-the-back shot at 23 feet 9 inches (7.24 m).
- Harlem Globetrotter Buckets Blakes has the Guinness World record for most underhanded half-court shots made in one minute, dropping 6. Harlem Globetrotter Big Easy Lofton has the Guinness World record for farthest basketball hook shot made at 61 feet 4 inches (18.69 m). Both of these records were formalized at an event in November 2014.
- During a game against the Pacers on November 4, 2015, with 1.1 seconds to go Jae Crowder of the Boston Celtics heaved a last-ditch full-court pass that turned into a bank shot. However, since he was out-of-bounds during the errant pass, the 94 foot shot did not count and instead was ruled a turnover.
- On December 16, 2021, Devonte Graham made a 61-foot game-winning buzzer-beater, the longest in NBA history, against the Oklahoma City Thunder, to lift New Orleans to a 113–110 victory. This shot came immediately after Thunder guard Shai Gilgeous-Alexander had hit a game tying three-pointer with 1.4 seconds remaining
- On February 25, 2023, the Philadelphia 76ers were down 110-107 to the Boston Celtics with 1.3 seconds left, when Joel Embiid took one dribble then threw up a three-quarter-court shot that dropped into the hoop but was waved off for being released milliseconds too late
- On February 27, 2024, Max Strus made a 59-foot game-winning buzzer-beater, the second longest in NBA history, against the visiting Dallas Mavericks, as Cleveland won 121–119
- On January 23, 2025, Nikola Jokić made a 3/4 court (approximately 70 feet) one-handed heave at the end of the third quarter in a 132-123 win for the Denver Nuggets over the Sacramento Kings.
- On March 26, 2025, Josh Giddey made a game-winning shot from just beyond half-court, in a 119-117 comeback win for the Chicago Bulls over the Los Angeles Lakers.
- On March 28, 2025, Nikola Jokić, repeating his feat from January 23, made a 62-foot one-handed heave at the end of the first half in a 129-93 win for the Denver Nuggets over the Utah Jazz. It was described by CBS Sports as "laughably casual".

== NBA half-court statistics ==
Number of shots taken from beyond half-court in the NBA ("heaves"), in the regular season
Season	Tot Att	Tot Made	% Made	Player w/Max Att	Max Player Att
2000	243	7	2.88%	Ray Allen	12
2001	298	13	4.36%	Andre Miller	13
2002	312	8	2.56%	Jason Kidd	11
2003	349	6	1.72%	Andre Miller	10
2004	337	8	2.37%	Steve Francis	9
2005	364	3	0.82%	Joe Johnson	10
2006	372	9	2.42%	Andre Miller, Dwyane Wade	10
2007	378	10	2.65%	Andre Miller	10
2008	468	10	2.14%	Andre Miller	11
2009	445	10	2.25%	Aaron Brooks	11
2010	417	9	2.16%	Chris Paul	11
2011	470	14	2.98%	Monta Ellis	10
2012	304	10	3.29%	Andre Miller	10
2013	420	8	1.90%	J.R. Smith	8
2014	444	16	3.60%	J.R. Smith	10
2015	433	11	2.54%	Stephen Curry	8
2016	440	16	3.64%	Stephen Curry	11
2017	503	10	1.99%	Stephen Curry	18
2018	525	5	0.95%	Raymond Felton	10
2019	472	14	2.97%	Luka Dončić	14
2020	417	9	2.16%	Chris Paul	11
2021	314	9	2.87%	Stephen Curry	11
2022	448	11	2.46%	Saddiq Bey, Tyrese Haliburton, Facundo Campazzo	9
2023	414	10	2.46%	Stephen Curry	9
2024	434	8	1.84%	Nikola Jokić	8
2025	522	12	2.30%	Nikola Jokić	22
Total	10,543	256	2.43%		
