= Bob Cunningham (basketball) =

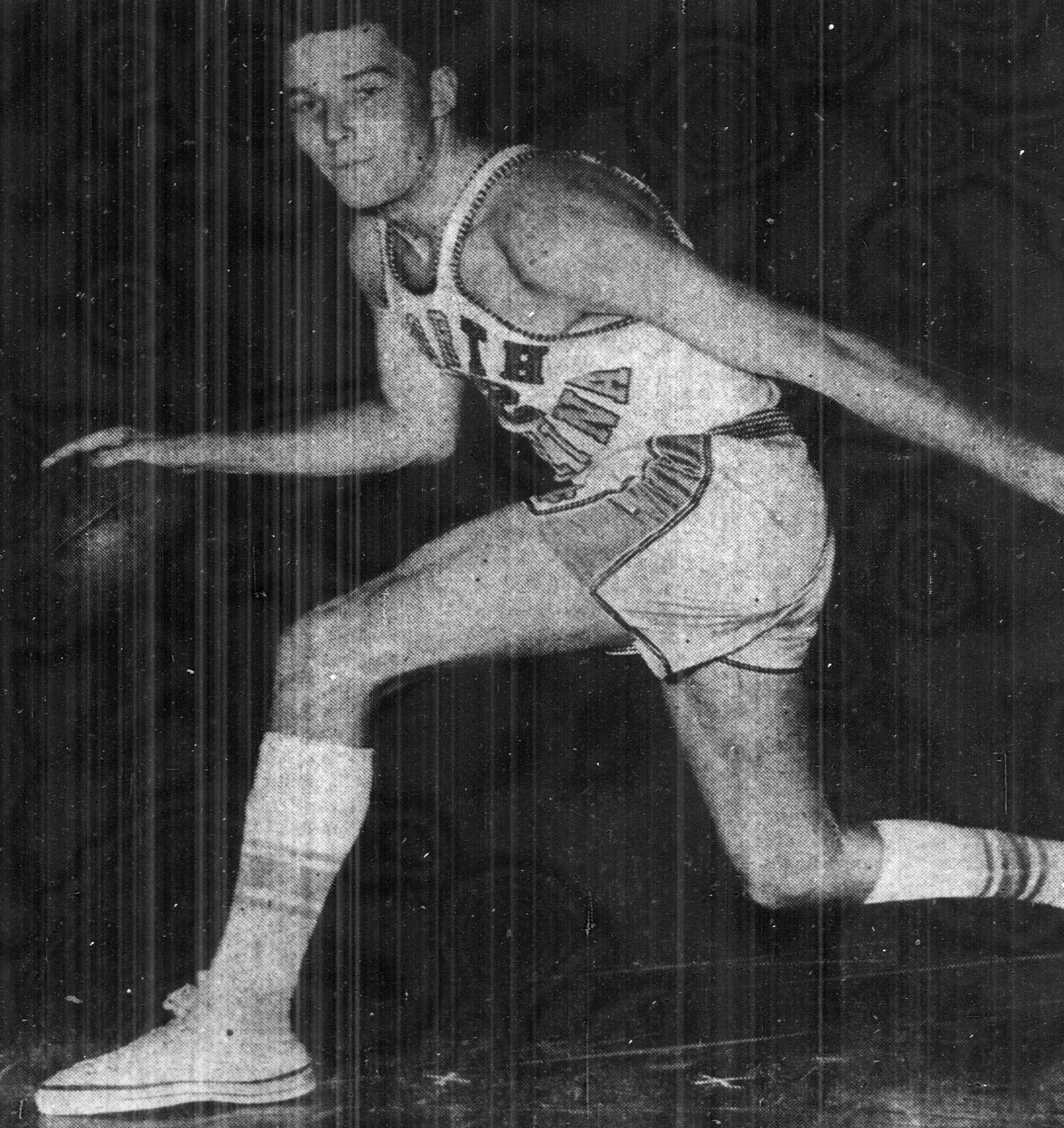
- Cunningham, circa 1957

Personal information
- Born: April 22, 1936 New York City, New York, U.S.
- Died: June 20, 2006 (aged 70) Savannah, Georgia, U.S.
- Listed height: 6 ft 4 in (1.93 m)
- Listed weight: 190 lb (86 kg)

Career information
- High school: All Hallows (Bronx, New York)
- College: North Carolina (1955–1958)
- NBA draft: 1958: undrafted
- Position: Guard / forward
- Number: 32

Career highlights
- NCAA champion (1957)

Robert Cunningham (April 22, 1936 – June 20, 2006) was an American college basketball player. He was one of the five starters on the 1957 national champion North Carolina Tar Heels who was brought by coach Frank McGuire from New York. Cunningham was considered the team's best defensive player.

Cunningham died at age 70 in a Savannah, Georgia, hospital after battling both cancer and a heart attack.
