= Pete Brennan =

American basketball player (1936–2012)

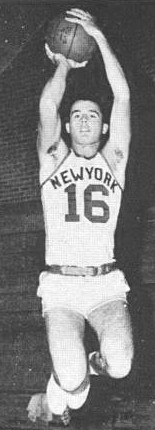

Personal information
- Born: September 23, 1936 Brooklyn, New York, U.S.
- Died: June 8, 2012 (aged 75) Durham, North Carolina, U.S.
- Listed height: 6 ft 6 in (1.98 m)
- Listed weight: 205 lb (93 kg)

Career information
- High school: St. Augustine (Brooklyn, New York)
- College: North Carolina (1955–1958)
- NBA draft: 1958: 1st round, 4th overall pick
- Drafted by: New York Knicks
- Playing career: 1958–1959
- Position: Small forward
- Number: 15, 16

Career history
- 1958–1959: New York Knicks

Career highlights
- NCAA champion (1957); Consensus second-team All-American (1958); ACC Player of the Year (1958); First-team All-ACC (1958); Second-team All-ACC (1957)
- Stats at NBA.com
- Stats at Basketball Reference

Peter Joseph Brennan (September 23, 1936 – June 8, 2012) was an American basketball player. He played one season in the National Basketball Association (NBA) for the New York Knicks.

== Early life ==
Brennan was born in Brooklyn, New York. He played collegiately for the University of North Carolina, where he was chosen ACC Men's Basketball Player of the Year in the 1957–58 season.

== Career ==
He was selected by the New York Knicks in the first round (4th pick overall) of the 1958 NBA draft. He played for the Knicks (1958–59) in the NBA for 16 games.

=== Honors ===
He was inducted into the North Carolina Sports Hall of Fame in 2007.

== Death ==
Brennan died of prostate cancer on June 8, 2012, in Durham, North Carolina.

== Career statistics ==
Legend
GP	Games played	GS	Games started	MPG	Minutes per game
FG%	Field goal percentage	3P%	3-point field goal percentage	FT%	Free throw percentage
RPG	Rebounds per game	APG	Assists per game	SPG	Steals per game
BPG	Blocks per game	PPG	Points per game	**Bold**	Career high

=== NBA ===
==== Regular season ====
Year	Team	GP	MPG	FG%	FT%	RPG	APG	PPG
1958–59	New York	16	8.5	.302	.560	1.9	.4	2.5

==== Playoffs ====
Year	Team	GP	MPG	FG%	FT%	RPG	APG	PPG
1959	New York	2	3.0	.286	.000	2.5	.0	2.0
