= Tommy Kearns =

American basketball player (born 1936)

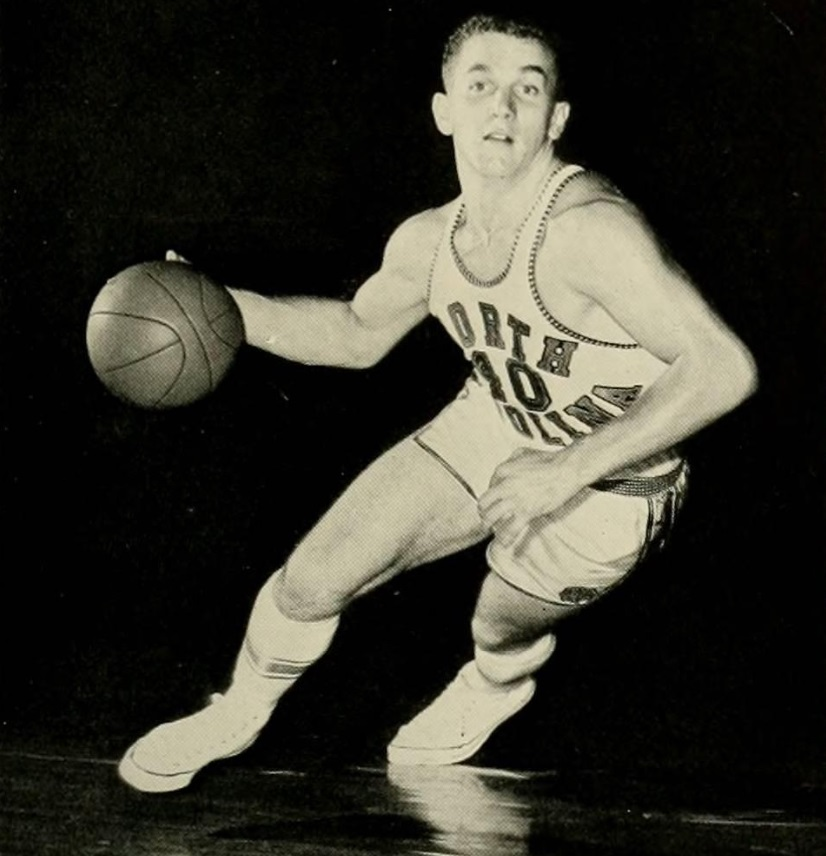
- Kearns in the 1956–57 season

Personal information
- Born: October 6, 1936 (age 90) New York City, New York, U.S.
- Listed height: 5 ft 11 in (1.80 m)
- Listed weight: 185 lb (84 kg)

Career information
- High school: Saint Ann's Academy (Manhattan, New York)
- College: North Carolina (1955–1958)
- NBA draft: 1958: 4th round, 30th overall pick
- Drafted by: Syracuse Nationals
- Playing career: 1958–1959
- Position: Point guard
- Number: 3

Career history
- 1958–1959: Syracuse Nationals

Career highlights
- NCAA champion (1957); Third-team All-American – AP (1958); 2× First-team All-ACC (1957, 1958)
- Stats at NBA.com
- Stats at Basketball Reference

Thomas Francis Kearns Jr. (born October 6, 1936) is an American former professional basketball player.

Born in New York City, he played collegiately for the University of North Carolina, where he played an integral role on the 1957 National Championship team. In an effort to rattle the 7-foot 1-inch Wilt Chamberlain of the Kansas Jayhawks in the national championship game, North Carolina coach Frank McGuire sent Kearns out at the start of the game to jump center. Kearns lost the tip-off but scored 11 points during the game. He was named first-team All-ACC in 1957 and 1958 and second-team All-America in 1957. Because of his national accolades, Kearns' number 40 was honored by the University of North Carolina and currently hangs in the rafters of the Dean Smith Center.

He was selected by the Syracuse Nationals in the fourth round (29th pick overall) of the 1958 NBA draft. He played for the Nationals in the NBA for one game. He scored two points during his professional basketball career.

In 2000, he played coach Garrick in Finding Forrester, a film directed by Gus Van Sant with Sean Connery and Rob Brown.

== Career statistics ==
Legend
GP	Games played	GS	Games started	MPG	Minutes per game
FG%	Field goal percentage	3P%	3-point field goal percentage	FT%	Free throw percentage
RPG	Rebounds per game	APG	Assists per game	SPG	Steals per game
BPG	Blocks per game	PPG	Points per game	**Bold**	Career high

=== NBA ===
==== Regular season ====
Year	Team	GP	MPG	FG%	FT%	RPG	APG	PPG
1958–59	Syracuse	1	7.0	1.000	–	.0	.0	2.0
