= List of North Carolina Tar Heels basketball honorees =

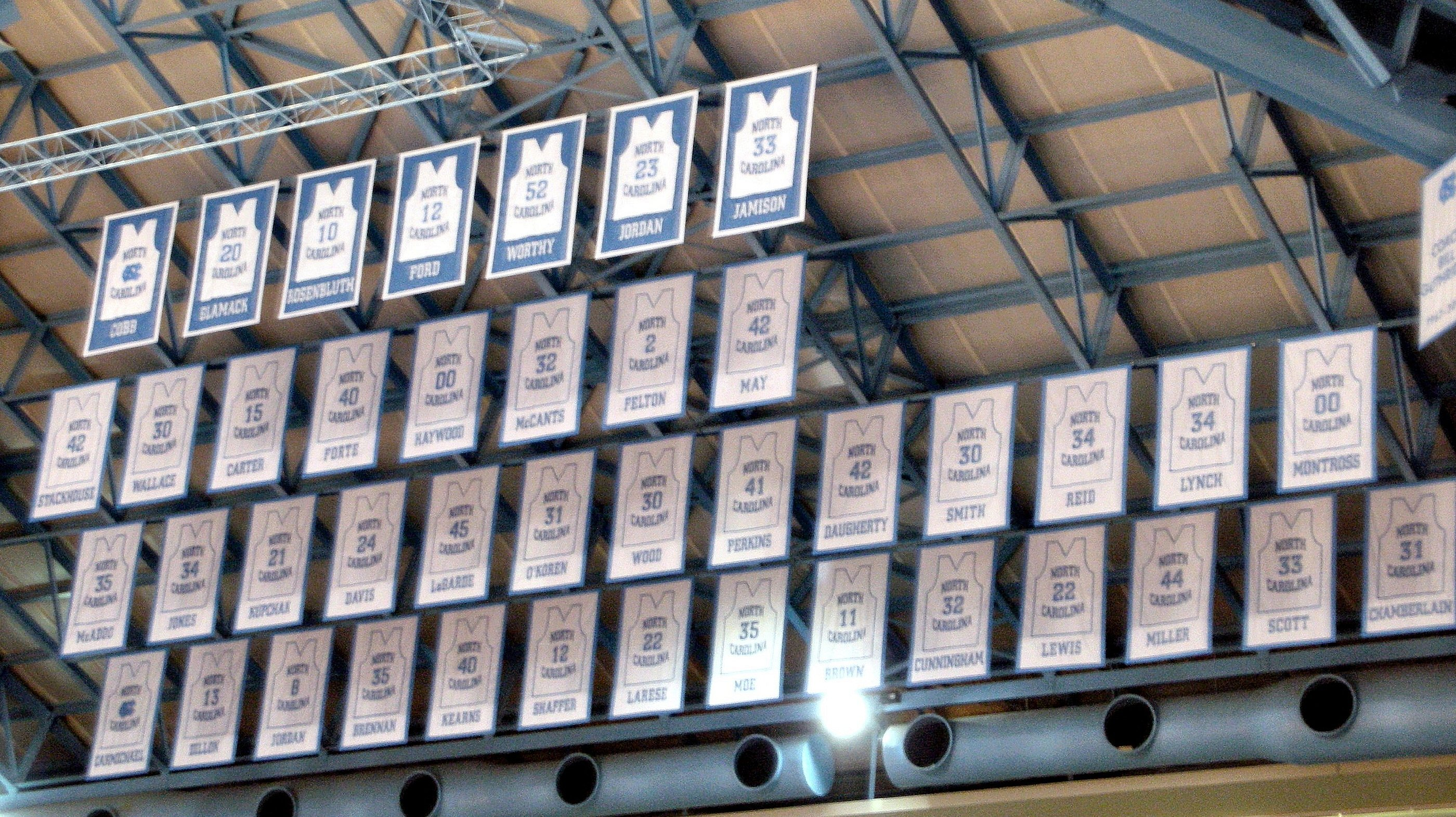
Since the North Carolina Tar Heels basketball team was founded in 1910, scores of its players have been named All-Americans, received national awards, and been inducted into various halls of fame.

The North Carolina Tar Heels men's basketball team was founded in 1910 to represent the University of North Carolina in intercollegiate competition and has participated in the sport all but one season since its inception. Over the course of the team's history, the Tar Heels' performance has ranged from losing records to undefeated seasons resulting in a national championship.

During periods of both ascendancy and mediocrity, individual North Carolina players of exceptional ability have received various accolades. In total, Tar Heels have been named to an All-America team 83 times, an All-Atlantic Coast Conference team 138 times, and an All-Southern Conference team 34 times. Of the All-America selections, thirty-seven players received first-team honors a total of fifty-eight times. Sixteen players were named consensus first-team All-Americans a total of twenty-five times.

Tar Heels have won several nationally recognized individual awards, including the Bob Cousy Award, the Senior CLASS Award, Academic All-America of the Year, and several of the National Player of the Year awards. The College Basketball Hall of Fame has inducted four former North Carolina players, and the Naismith Memorial Basketball Hall of Fame has enshrined three. Five former North Carolina head coaches have also been inducted into the College Basketball Hall of Fame.

== All-Americans ==
Each year, numerous publications and organizations release lists of All-America teams, hypothetical rosters of players considered the best in the nation at their respective positions. Some selecting organizations choose more than one roster of All-Americans, in which case they use the terms "first team", "second team", and "third team" as appropriate. Some selectors also award honorable mentions to outstanding players who did not make any of their teams.

The National Collegiate Athletic Association (NCAA), a college sports governing body, uses officially recognized All-America selectors to determine the "consensus" selections. To earn "consensus" status, a player must win honors based on a point system computed from the four different all-America teams. The point system consists of three points for first team, two points for second team and one point for third team. No honorable mention or fourth team or lower are used in the computation. The top five totals plus ties are first team and the next five plus ties are second team. Over time, the sources used to determine the consensus selections have changed, and since 1997, the NCAA has used these selectors to determine consensus All-Americans: Associated Press (AP), the United States Basketball Writers Association (USBWA), the Sporting News (TSN), and the National Association of Basketball Coaches (NABC).

In 1923, Cartwright Carmichael was selected to the Helms first team, which made him the first North Carolina player to be named an All-American. In addition, Carmichael became the first Tar Heel first consensus All-American. Carmichael was also named a consensus All-American in 1924, which made him the first of seven North Carolina player to receive the honor twice. Of those seven players, Jack Cobb and Tyler Hansbrough are the only Tar Heels players to achieve consensus First-team All America honors three times in their collegiate career. Fifteen other Tar Heels have earned consensus First-team All-America honors twenty-three times throughout the program's history.

Key
Consensus First-team selection ‡	Consensus Second-team selection †
For a guide to the abbreviations used, see the glossary.

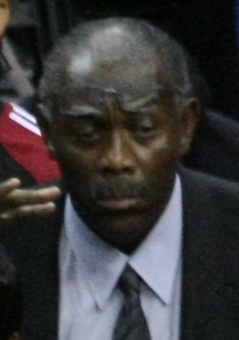
Bob McAdoo was a consensus first-team All-American in 1972.

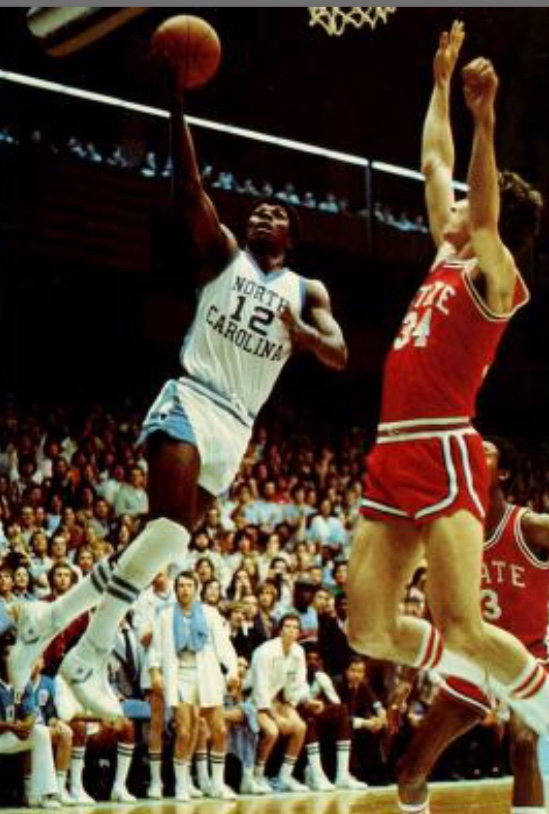
Phil Ford was a two-time consensus first-team All-American.

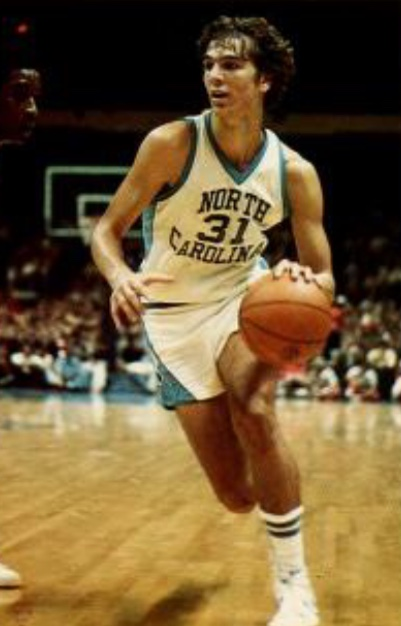
Mike O'Koren was a three-time All-American during his time at North Carolina.

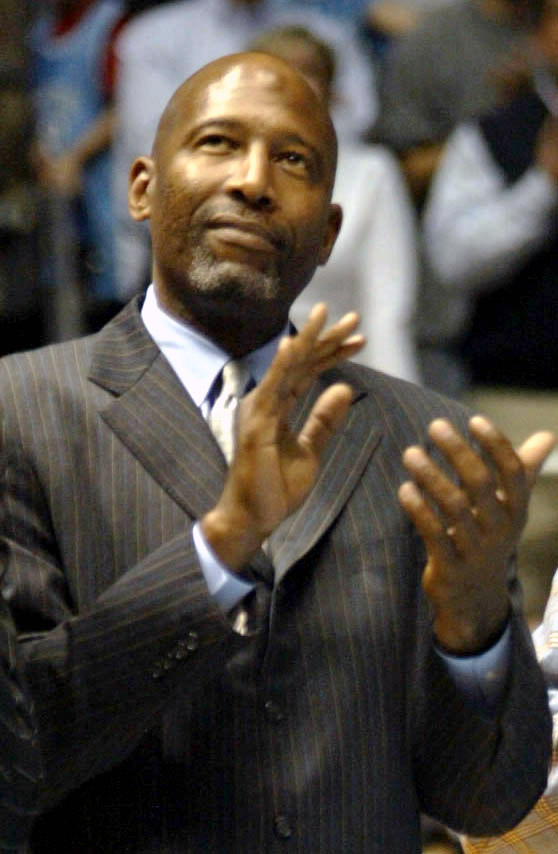
James Worthy was named an All-American twice.

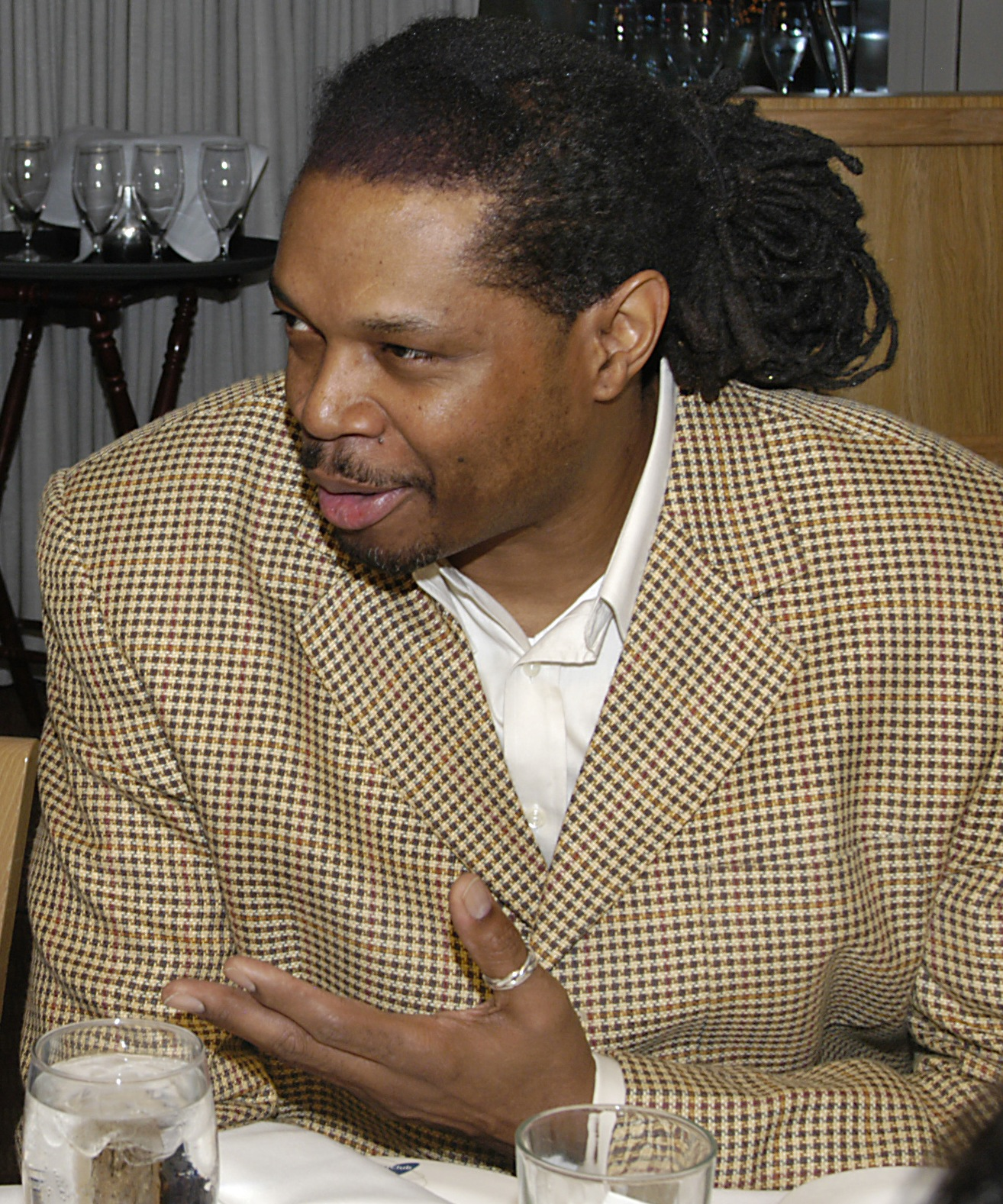
Sam Perkins was a consensus first-team All-American in his final two seasons at North Carolina.

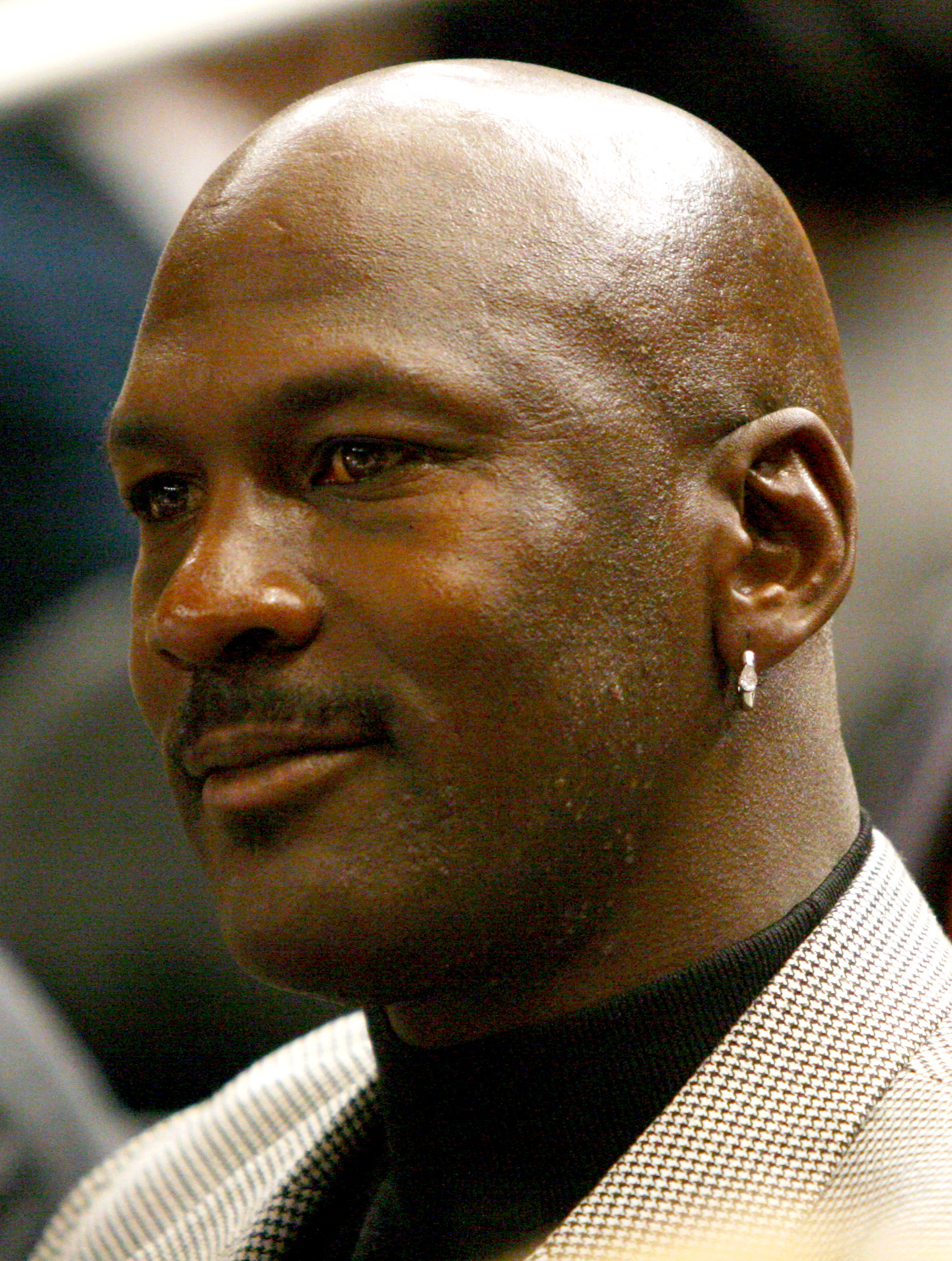
Michael Jordan was a consensus first-team All-American two times while at UNC.

List of All-Americans showing the year won, player, position and selectors
Year	Player name	Position	Selector(s)
1923	Cartwright Carmichael‡	C	HLMS-1
1924	Cartwright Carmichael‡	C	HLMS-1
1924	Jack Cobb‡	F	HLMS-1
1925	Jack Cobb‡	F	HLMS-1
1926	Jack Cobb‡	F	HLMS-1
1940	George Glamack‡	F, C	HLMS-1; CNVR-2
1941	George Glamack‡	F, C	HLMS-1; CNVR-2
1945	Jim Jordan	G	HLMS-2
1946	John Dillon†	F	HLMS-3; CNVR-2; TSN-1
1946	Jim Jordan	G	HLMS-1
1956	Lennie Rosenbluth	F	AP-2; UPI-2; NEA-3; INS-2; COL-3
1957	Lennie Rosenbluth‡	F	AP-1; USBWA-1; NABC-1; UPI-1; INS-1
1957	Tommy Kearns	G	CNVR-2
1958	Tommy Kearns	G	AP-3
1958	Pete Brennan†	F	AP-2; USBWA-1; NABC-3; UPI-3; INS-2
1959	York Larese	G	AP-3;
1959	Doug Moe	G, F	TSN-2
1959	Lee Shaffer	F	NABC-3; AW-3
1960	York Larese	G	NABC-3; AP-HM
1960	Lee Shaffer†	F	AP-3; USBWA-1; UPI-3; NEA-2; TSN-2
1961	York Larese	G	AP-3; NABC-2; UPI-3; NEA-3; TSN-2; CNVR-2
1961	Doug Moe	G, F	AP-2; USBWA-1; NABC-3; NEA-3; TSN-2
1964	Billy Cunningham	F, C	USBWA-1; HLMS-1
1965	Billy Cunningham	F, C	AP-3; NABC-2; UPI-2; HLMS-1; TSN-2
1966	Bob Lewis	G	AP-3; NABC-3; HLMS-1
1967	Bob Lewis	G	NABC-3; HLMS-1
1967	Larry Miller†	G, F	AP-2; USBWA-1; NABC-2; UPI-3; CNVR-1; HLMS-1
1968	Larry Miller‡	G, F	AP-1; USBWA-1; NABC-1; UPI-2; CNVR-1; HLMS-1
1969	Charlie Scott†	G	AP-2; USBWA-1; NABC-1; UPI-2; HLMS-1; CNVR-1; BW-1
1970	Charlie Scott†	G	AP-2; USBWA-1; NABC-1; UPI-2; HLMS-1; CNVR-1; BW-1; NEA-1; NBACO-1
1972	Bill Chamberlain	F	AP-HM; NBACO-2
1972	Bob McAdoo‡	F, C	AP-2; USBWA-1; NABC-3; UPI-2; NBACO-1; HLMS-1; NEA-1; TSN-1
1972	Dennis Wuycik	F	AP-HM; NABC-2; BW-2; HLMS-1
1974	Bobby Jones†	F	AP-2; USBWA-2; NABC-2; UPI-2
1975	Mitch Kupchak	F, C	HLMS-1;
1976	Mitch Kupchak†	F, C	AP-2; USBWA-2; NABC-2; UPI-2; HLMS-1; BW-3
1976	Phil Ford†	G	AP-2; NABC-1; UPI-2; BW-1; HLMS-1; TSN-1
1977	Phil Ford‡	G	AP-1; USBWA-1; NABC-1; UPI-2; BW-1; HLMS-1; TSN-2
1977	Tommy LaGarde	F, C	AP-HM; TSN-2
1978	Phil Ford‡	G	AP-1; USBWA-1; NABC-1; UPI-1; BW-1; HLMS-1; TSN-1
1978	Mike O'Koren	F	NABC-3; HLMS-1; CNVR-1; BW-2
1979	Mike O'Koren†	F	USBWA-2; NABC-2; UPI-2; HLMS-1; CNVR-1; BW-1; TSN-1
1980	Mike O'Koren†	F	USBWA-2; NABC-2; UPI-2; HLMS-1; CNVR-1; BW-2; TSN-1
1980	Al Wood	G, F	CNVR-1
1981	Al Wood†	G, F	AP-2; USBWA-1; NABC-1; CNVR-1; HLMS-1
1981	James Worthy	F	USBWA-1
1982	Sam Perkins†	F	USBWA-2; NABC-2; UPI-2; AP-HM; CNVR-1; HLMS-1; NAIS-2; TSN-2; BW-2
1982	James Worthy‡	F	AP-2; USBWA-1; NABC-1; UPI-1; BW-1; NAIS-1; NBACO-1; CNVR-1; HLMS-1; TSN-1
1983	Michael Jordan‡	G	AP-1; USBWA-1; NABC-1; UPI-1; TSN-1; NAIS-1; NBACO-1; BW-1; ESPN-1; ABA-1; BT-1; HLMS-1; CNVR-1
1983	Sam Perkins‡	F	AP-3; USBWA-1; NABC-2; UPI-2; CNVR-1; HLMS-1; NAIS-1; TSN-2; BW-2; ESPN-1; ABA-1; BT-3
1984	Michael Jordan‡	G	AP-1; USBWA-1; NABC-1; UPI-1; TSN-1; NAIS-1; NBACO-1; BW-1; ESPN-1; ABA-1; BT-1; HLMS-1; CNVR-1
1984	Sam Perkins‡	F	AP-1; USBWA-1; NABC-1; UPI-1; CNVR-1; HLMS-1; NAIS-1; TSN-1; BW-1; ESPN-1; ABA-1; BT-1; NBACO-1
1986	Brad Daugherty†	C	AP-2; USBWA-1; NABC-2; UPI-2; BW-1; TSN-2
1986	Kenny Smith	G	NABC-4
1987	Kenny Smith‡	G	AP-1; USBWA-1; NABC-1; UPI-1; BT-1; BW-1; NAIS-1; TSN-1; HLMS-1; CNVR-1
1988	J.R. Reid‡	F	AP-1; USBWA-1; NABC-1; UPI-2; BW-1; TSN-2; BT-1
1989	J.R. Reid	F	NABC-3; BT-3
1991	Rick Fox	F	AP-HM; TSN-3
1993	Eric Montross†	C	AP-2; NABC-2; UPI-3; JW-1; TSN-2; BW-2; BT-3
1994	Eric Montross†	C	AP-2; NABC-1; NAIS-1; JW-1; TSN-2; BW-1; BT-1
1995	Jerry Stackhouse‡	G, F	AP-1; USBWA-1; NABC-1; UPI-1; JW-1; TSN-2; BT-2
1995	Rasheed Wallace†	F, C	AP-2; USBWA-2; NABC-2; UPI-2; TSN-1; BT-1; JW-1
1997	Antawn Jamison†	F	AP-2; NABC-2; JW-1; TSN-2; BW-2; BT-3
1998	Antawn Jamison‡	F	AP-1; USBWA-1; NABC-1; TSN-1; JW-1; BW-1; BT-1; BA-1; BN-1
1998	Vince Carter†	G, F	AP-2; USBWA-2; NABC-2; TSN-2; JW-1; BT-2; BW-3; BN-2
1998	Shammond Williams	G	AP-HM; BN-3
2001	Brendan Haywood	C	NABC-3; TSN-2; AP-HM
2001	Joseph Forte‡	G	AP-1; USBWA-1; NABC-1; TSN-1; BT-1; CBSS-1; ESPN-1; JW-1
2004	Sean May	F	AP-HM; ESPN-3
2004	Rashad McCants	G	AP-3; TSN-3; BT-2; CBS-2; SI-2;
2005	Raymond Felton	G	AP-3
2005	Sean May†	F	USBWA-2; TSN-2; JW-1; ESPN-1; SI-2; BT-2
2005	Rashad McCants	G	NABC-3; AP-HM
2006	Tyler Hansbrough†	F, C	AP-3; NABC-3; TSN-1; RA-1; BT-3;
2007	Tyler Hansbrough‡	F, C	AP-2; USBWA-1; NABC-1; TSN-1; RA-1; BT-2; JW-1; SI-2
2008	Tyler Hansbrough‡	F, C	AP-1; USBWA-1; NABC-1; TSN-1; RA-1; BT-1; JW-1; SI-1; FOX-1
2009	Tyler Hansbrough‡	F, C	AP-1; USBWA-1; NABC-1; TSN-1; RA-1; BT-2; JW-1; SI-1; FOX-2
2009	Ty Lawson†	G	AP-2; NABC-2; TSN-2; JW-1; SI-1; CBSS-1; BT-1; RA-2; FOX-3
2012	Harrison Barnes	F	NABC-2; TSN-3; AP-HM
2012	Kendall Marshall	G	AP-3; CBS-1
2012	Tyler Zeller†	F, C	AP-2; USBWA-2; NABC-2; TSN-2; JW-2; BT-2; CBS-3
2014	Marcus Paige	G	TSN-2
2016	Brice Johnson‡	F	AP-1; USBWA-1; NABC-1; SI-1; TSN-3
2017	Justin Jackson‡	F/G	AP-1; USBWA-2; NABC-1; SI-1; TSN-1
2018	Joel Berry II	G	NABC-3
2018	Luke Maye	F	AP-3; TSN-3
2023	Armando Bacot	C/F	AP-3; USBWA-3; TSN-3
2024	Armando Bacot	C/F	USBWA-3
2024	R. J. Davis‡	G	AP-1; USBWA-1; NABC-1; TSN-1
2026	Caleb Wilson†	F	AP-2; USBWA-2; NABC-3; TSN-3

== All-conference honorees ==
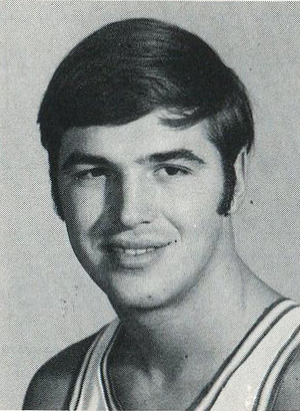
Dick Grubar was named to the Second-team All-ACC squad in 1969.

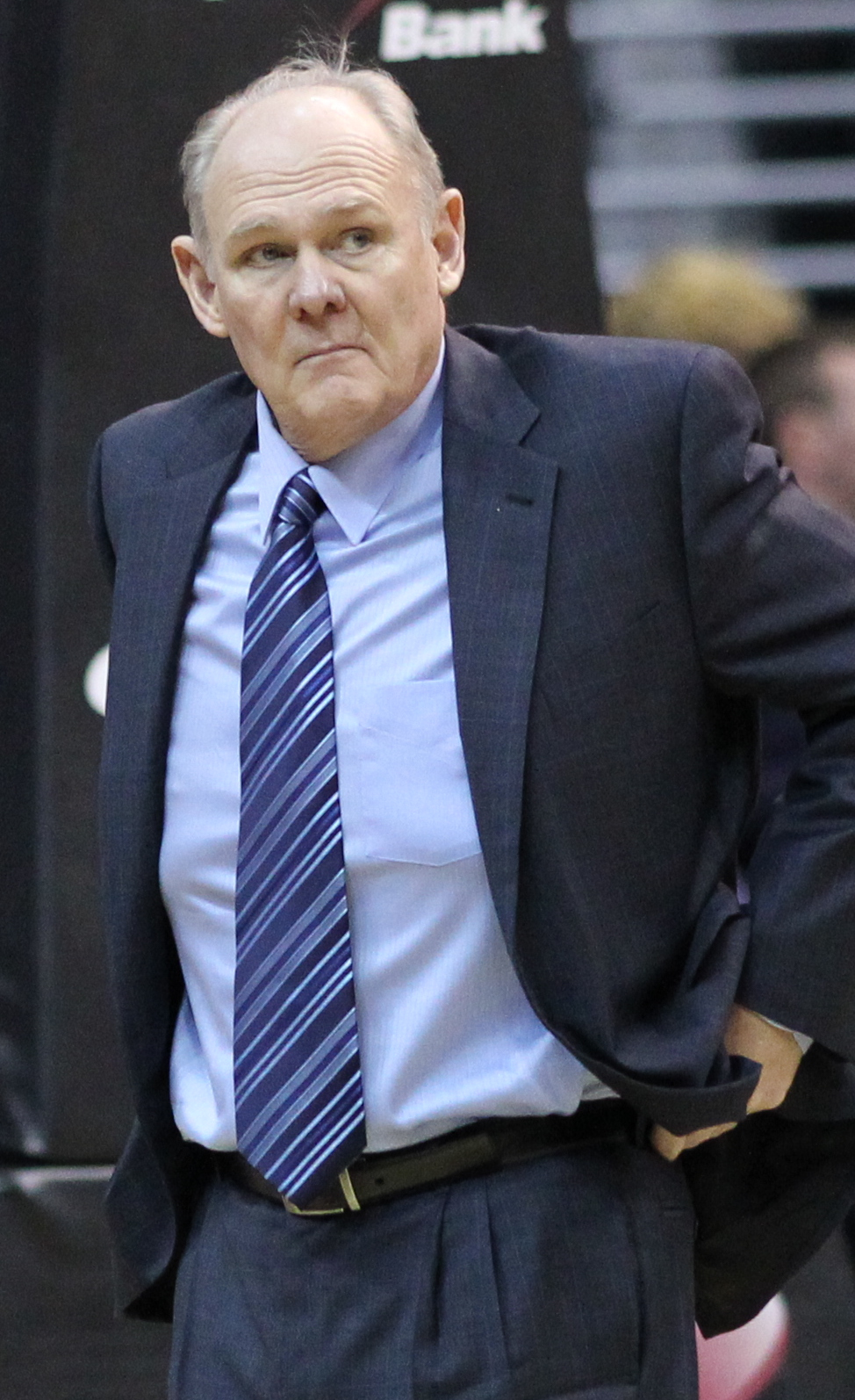
George Karl was named to a First-team All-ACC team once in his time at North Carolina.

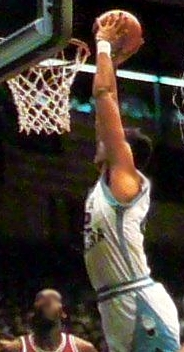
Brad Daugherty was twice named to a First-team All-ACC team.

Just as the media recognizes the nation's best players with All-America lists, individual athletic conferences honor their best players with "all-conference" selections. In 1921, North Carolina joined the Southern Conference (SoCon). A year later, Cartwright Carmichael and Monk McDonald became the first Tar Heels named to an All-Southern Conference team. North Carolina was a member of the league from 1921 to 1953, and twenty-two Tar Heels received All-Southern Conference honors a total of thirty-four times.

After the 1952 season, North Carolina and six other schools left the Southern Conference to form the Atlantic Coast Conference (ACC). The following year, the conference honored its inaugural season's best players with an All-ACC team. In that initial class, one Tar Heel, Jerry Vayda, was selected to the second team. Since 1953, North Carolina players have received first-team All-ACC honors a total of 73 times. Tar Heels have been named to All-ACC second or third teams an additional 64 times, although those teams have not been published continuously.

In 2002, the Atlantic Coast Conference published the "ACC 50th Anniversary Basketball Team", a list of the league's fifty best players from its first half-century as chosen by a 120-member committee. North Carolina had the most selections of the ACC members. The list included twelve former Tar Heels: Billy Cunningham, a Tar Heel forward and center from 1962 to 1965; Brad Daugherty, a center from 1982 to 1986; Walter Davis, a guard and forward from 1973 to 1977; Phil Ford, a guard from 1974 to 1978; Antawn Jamison, a forward from 1995 to 1998; Bobby Jones, a forward from 1971 to 1974; Michael Jordan, a guard from 1982 to 1984; Larry Miller, a forward from 1964 to 1968; Sam Perkins, a forward and center from 1981 to 1984; Lennie Rosenbluth, a forward from 1954 to 1957; Charlie Scott, a guard from 1967 to 1970; and James Worthy, a forward from 1979 to 1982.

Key
First-team selection	Second-team selection	Third-team selection
For a guide to the abbreviations used, see the glossary.

Year	Player name	Position
1954	Jerry Vayda†	F
1955	Lennie Rosenbluth	F
1956	Lennie Rosenbluth	F
1957	Pete Brennan	F
1957	Tommy Kearns	G
1957	Lennie Rosenbluth	F
1958	Pete Brennan	F
1958	Tommy Kearns	G
1959	York Larese	G
1959	Doug Moe	G, F
1959	Lee Shaffer	F
1960	York Larese	G
1960	Lee Shaffer	F
1961	York Larese	G
1961	Doug Moe	G, F
1962	Larry Brown	G
1962	Jim Hudock	F
1963	Larry Brown	G
1963	Billy Cunningham	F
1964	Larry Brown	G
1964	Billy Cunningham	F
1965	Billy Cunningham	F
1965	Bob Lewis	G
1966	Bob Lewis	G
1966	Larry Miller	G, F
1967	Bob Lewis	G
1967	Larry Miller	G, F
1968	Rusty Clark	C
1968	Larry Miller	G, F
1968	Charlie Scott	G|
1969	Bill Bunting	F, C
1969	Dick Grubar	G
1969	Charlie Scott	G
1970	Charlie Scott	G
1971	George Karl	G
1971	Dennis Wuycik	F
1972	Bill Chamberlain	F
1972	George Karl	G
1972	Robert McAdoo	F, C
1972	Dennis Wuycik	F
1973	George Karl	G
1973	Bobby Jones	F
1974	Darrell Elston	G
1974	Bobby Jones	F
1975	Mitch Kupchak	F, C
1976	Walter Davis	G, F
1976	Phil Ford	G
1976	Mitch Kupchak	F, C
1977	Walter Davis	G, F
1977	Phil Ford	G
1977	Tommy LaGarde	F, C
1978	Phil Ford	G
1979	Mike O'Koren	F
1979	Al Wood	G, F

Year	Player name	Position
1980	Mike O'Koren	F
1980	Al Wood	G, F
1981	Mike O'Koren	F
1981	Al Wood	G, F
1981	James Worthy	F
1982	James Worthy	F
1982	Sam Perkins	F
1983	Michael Jordan	G
1983	Sam Perkins	F
1984	Michael Jordan	G
1984	Sam Perkins	F
1985	Brad Daugherty	C
1985	Kenny Smith	G
1986	Brad Daugherty	C
1986	Steve Hale	G
1986	Kenny Smith	G
1987	Kenny Smith	G
1987	J.R. Reid	F
1987	Joe Wolf	F, C
1988	Jeff Lebo	G
1988	J.R. Reid	F
1989	Steve Bucknall	G
1989	Kevin Madden	G, F
1990	Rick Fox	F
1991	Pete Chilcutt	F
1991	Rick Fox	F
1992	Hubert Davis	G
1992	George Lynch	F
1993	George Lynch	F
1993	Eric Montross	C
1994	Eric Montross	C
1994	Derrick Phelps	G
1995	Jeff McInnis	G
1996	Dante Calabria	G
1996	Antawn Jamison	F
1996	Jeff McInnis	G
1997	Antawn Jamison	F
1997	Shammond Williams	G
1997	Serge Zwikker	C
1997	Vince Carter	G, F
1998	Vince Carter	G, F
1998	Ed Cota	G
1998	Antawn Jamison	F
1998	Shammond Williams	G
1999	Ed Cota	G
1999	Ademola Okulaja	F
2000	Ed Cota	G
2000	Joseph Forte	G
2000	Brendan Haywood	C
2001	Jason Capel	F
2001	Joseph Forte	G
2001	Brendan Haywood	C
2002	Jason Capel	F
2003	Raymond Felton	G

Year	Player name	Position
2004	Raymond Felton	G
2004	Sean May	F
2004	Rashad McCants	G
2005	Raymond Felton	G
2005	Sean May	F
2005	Rashad McCants	G
2005	Jawad Williams	F
2006	Tyler Hansbrough	F, C
2006	David Noel	F
2006	Reyshawn Terry	F
2007	Tyler Hansbrough	F, C
2007	Brandan Wright	F, C
2008	Tyler Hansbrough	F, C
2008	Wayne Ellington	G
2009	Danny Green	G, F
2009	Tyler Hansbrough	F, C
2009	Ty Lawson	G
2011	Harrison Barnes	F
2011	John Henson	F
2011	Kendall Marshall	G
2011	Tyler Zeller	F, C
2012	Harrison Barnes	F
2012	John Henson	F
2012	Kendall Marshall	G
2012	Tyler Zeller	F, C
2013	Reggie Bullock	G
2013	James Michael McAdoo	F
2014	James Michael McAdoo	F
2014	Marcus Paige	G
2015	Marcus Paige	G
2015	Brice Johnson	F
2016	Brice Johnson	F
2017	Justin Jackson	F/G
2017	Joel Berry II	G
2018	Joel Berry II	G
2018	Luke Maye	F
2019	Cameron Johnson	F
2019	Luke Maye	F
2019	Coby White	G
2020	Cole Anthony	G
2020	Garrison Brooks	F
2021	Armando Bacot	C/F
2022	Armando Bacot	C/F
2023	Armando Bacot	C/F
2024	Armando Bacot	C/F
2024	R. J. Davis	G
2024	Harrison Ingram	F
2025	R. J. Davis	G
2026	Caleb Wilson	F
2026	Henri Veesaar	C

=== All-Southern Conference ===
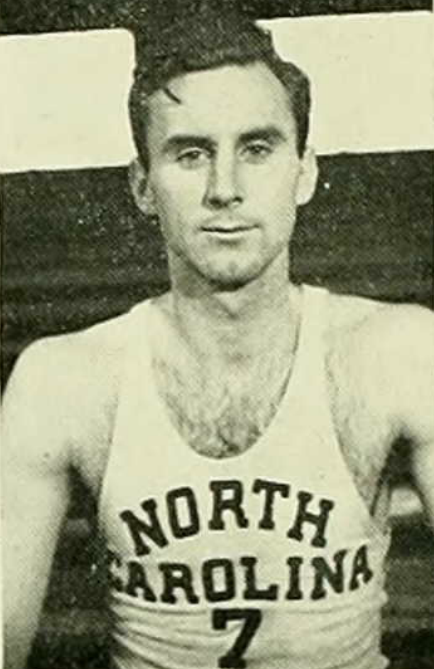
Earl Ruth was named to the All-Southern conference team in 1937.

Year	Player name	Position
1922	Cartwright Carmichael	C
1922	Monk McDonald	G
1923	Cartwright Carmichael	C
1924	Cartwright Carmichael	C
1924	Jack Cobb	F
1924	Bill Dodderer	C
1924	Monk McDonald	G
1925	Jack Cobb	F
1925	Bill Dodderer	C
1926	Jack Cobb	F
1926	Bill Dodderer	C
1926	Artie Newcombe	C

Year	Player name	Position
1932	Tom Alexander	G
1932	Virgil Weathers	F
1934	Jim McCachren	G
1935	Stewart Aitken	F
1935	Ivan Glace	C
1935	Jim McCachren	G
1936	Jim McCachren	G
1937	Earl Ruth	G
1940	George Glamack	F, C
1941	George Glamack	F, C
1941	Bob Rose	C

Year	Player name	Position
1942	Bob Rose	C
1944	Boyce Box	F
1944	Bernie Mock	C
1945	Manny Alvarez	G
1945	Jim Jordan	G
1946	John Dillon	F
1947	Jim White	G
1947	Bob Paxton	F
1948	Bob Paxton	F
1949	Coy Carson	F
1949	Hugo Kappler	F

== Award recipients ==
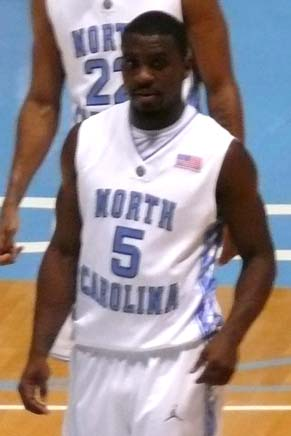
Ty Lawson won the Bob Cousy Award and the ACC Player of the Year during his career at North Carolina.

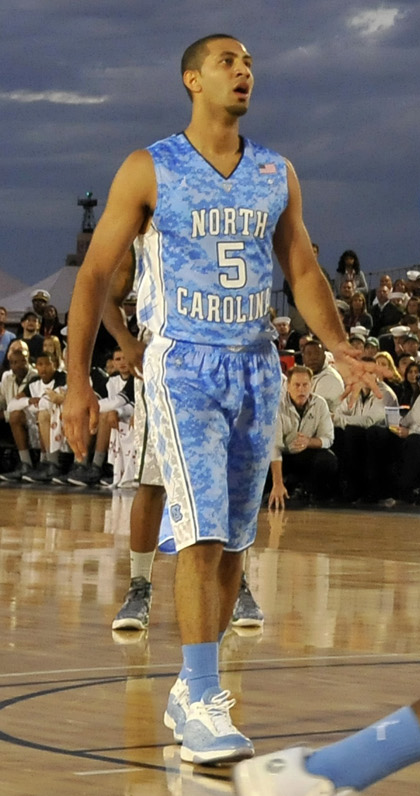
Point guard Kendall Marshall won the Bob Cousy Award for the 2011–12 season.

Various organizations bestow awards recognizing the best player overall or at a specific position, and some of these annual awards are considered highly prestigious honors. In 1926, forward Jack Cobb was named the Helms Foundation College Basketball Player of the Year, the most outstanding intercollegiate men's basketball player in the United States. George Glamack won the Helms award for player of the year for two consecutive years, in 1940 and 1941. In 1957, the Helms Foundation bestowed its player of the year award to Lennie Rosenbluth. Guard Phil Ford won four National Player of Year awards for his efforts during the 1987–88 season. Upon the conclusion of the 1982 NCAA tournament, Tar Heel James Worthy was named NCAA basketball tournament Most Outstanding Player (NCAA MOP) for his efforts during the tournament that year. In 1983, Sporting News awarded its player of the year award to Michael Jordan. The following year, Jordan swept all the National Player of Year awards. After the 1993 NCAA tournament, guard Donald Williams was named the NCAA MOP. In 1998, Antawn Jamison was consensus National Player of Year after he won all the National Player of Year awards. In 2005, point guard Raymond Felton won the Bob Cousy Award, for the nation's best point guard. After the 2005 NCAA tournament's conclusion, Sean May was named NCAA MOP. That same year, Marvin Williams was named the National Freshman of the Year by the USBWA. The succeeding year, Tyler Hansbrough won the same award. Two years later, in 2008, Hansbrough was swept all the National Player of Year awards. In 2009, Ty Lawson won the Bob Cousy award for his efforts at the point guard position in the 2008–09 season. Hansbrough won the Senior CLASS Award which is given each year to the outstanding senior NCAA Division I Student-Athlete of the Year in men's basketball. After completing the 2009 NCAA tournament, guard Wayne Ellington was named NCAA MOP. Center and forward Tyler Zeller won the Academic All-America of the Year award in 2012. Also in 2012, Kendall Marshall won the Bob Cousy award.

Since North Carolina joined the Atlantic Coast Conference in 1953, fourteen Tar Heels have been named ACC Player of the Year fifteen times. The only Tar Heel to repeat as winner of ACC Player of the Year was Larry Miller in 1967 and 1968. The ACC Rookie of the Year title was first awarded during the 1976 season and since its creation nine North Carolina players have won the award, with the most recent being Harrison Barnes in 2011. Nine North Carolina basketball players have won the Anthony J. McKevlin Award for the ACC's male athlete of the year ten times. The lone Tar Heel to win the award twice was Phil Ford in 1977 and 1978.

After his national championship-winning season in 1957, Frank McGuire received Coach of the Year honors from the UPI and the ACC. Dean Smith won the ACC Coach of the Year eight times before retiring. Smith also won coach of the year from the NABC in 1977 for leading the Tar Heels to the National Championship Game and from the NABC in 1993 after he helped coach the Tar Heels to a national championship victory. In 1998 Bill Guthridge won the Coach of the Year awards for the Naismith, NABC, and ACC. Matt Doherty won the AP Coach of the Year award in 2001. The Commonwealth Athletic Club of Kentucky presented its Coach of the Year award, the Adolph Rupp Cup, to Roy Williams in 2006 for leading the Tar Heels to the NCAA Tournament after much of the roster due to graduation or for the NBA draft.

=== Players ===
National awards	Recipient(s) and year received
Naismith College Player of the Year	Michael Jordan (1984); Antawn Jamison (1998); Tyler Hansbrough (2008)
John R. Wooden Award	Phil Ford (1978); Michael Jordan (1984); Antawn Jamison (1998); Tyler Hansbrough (2008)
Adolph Rupp Trophy	Michael Jordan (1984); Antawn Jamison (1998); Tyler Hansbrough (2008)
Associated Press College Basketball Player of the Year	Michael Jordan (1984); Antawn Jamison (1998); Tyler Hansbrough (2008)
NABC Player of the Year	Phil Ford (1978); Michael Jordan (1984); Antawn Jamison (1998); Tyler Hansbrough (2008)
Oscar Robertson Trophy	Phil Ford (1978); Michael Jordan (1984); Antawn Jamison (1998); Tyler Hansbrough (2008)
Helms Foundation College Basketball Player of the Year	Jack Cobb (1926); George Glamack (1940, 1941); Lennie Rosenbluth (1957)
Sporting News Men's College Basketball Player of the Year	Phil Ford (1978); Michael Jordan (1983, 1984); Antawn Jamison (1998); Tyler Hansbrough (2008)
UPI College Basketball Player of the Year	Michael Jordan (1984)
Academic All-America of the Year	Tyler Zeller (2012)
Bob Cousy Award	Raymond Felton (2005); Ty Lawson (2009); Kendall Marshall (2012)
Jerry West Award	R. J. Davis (2024)
Senior CLASS Award	Tyler Hansbrough (2009), Luke Maye (2019)
NCAA basketball tournament Most Outstanding Player	James Worthy (1982); Donald Williams (1993); Sean May (2005); Wayne Ellington (2009); Joel Berry (2017)
USBWA National Freshman of the Year	Marvin Williams (2005); Tyler Hansbrough (2006)
Conference Awards	Recipient(s) and year received
ACC Player of the Year	Lennie Rosenbluth (1957); Pete Brennan (1958); Lee Shaffer (1960); Billy Cunningham (1965); Larry Miller (1967, 1968); Mitch Kupchak (1976); Phil Ford (1978); Michael Jordan (1984); Antawn Jamison (1998); Joseph Forte (2001); Tyler Hansbrough (2008); Ty Lawson (2009); Tyler Zeller (2012); Justin Jackson (2017); R. J. Davis (2024)
ACC Rookie of the Year	Sam Perkins (1981); Michael Jordan (1982); J.R. Reid (1987); Ed Cota (1997); Joseph Forte (2000); Marvin Williams (2005); Tyler Hansbrough (2006); Brandan Wright (2007); Harrison Barnes (2011)
Anthony J. McKevlin Award	Lennie Rosenbluth (1957); Larry Miller (1967); Charlie Scott (1970); Phil Ford (1977, 1978); James Worthy (1982); Michael Jordan (1984); Antawn Jamison (1998); Sean May (2005); Tyler Hansbrough (2008)

=== Coaches ===
Coach of the Year Awards and Recipients
"Coach of the Year"	Recipient(s) and year received
Naismith	Dean Smith (1993); Bill Guthridge (1998)
AP	Matt Doherty (2001)
UPI	Frank McGuire (1957)
Adolph Rupp	Roy Williams (2006)
NABC	Dean Smith (1977); Bill Guthridge (1998)
ACC	Frank McGuire (1957); Dean Smith (1967, 1968, 1971, 1976, 1977, 1979, 1988, 1993); Bill Guthridge (1998); Roy Williams (2006, 2011)

== Hall of Fame inductees ==
The National Collegiate Basketball Hall of Fame has commemorated many of the sport's most outstanding and most innovative personalities. Among them are four former North Carolina players and five former North Carolina head coaches.

=== College Basketball Hall of Fame ===
Key
Naismith Memorial Basketball Hall of Fame inductee ^

For a guide to the abbreviations used, see the glossary.

Players inducted
Inducted	Player	Position	At UNC
1986	Billy Cunningham	F, C	1962–1965
2000	Bob McAdoo	F, C	1971–72
2003	James Worthy	F	1979–1982
2009	Michael Jordan	G	1981–1984
2012	Phil Ford	G	1974–1978
2018	Charlie Scott	G	1967–1970
2018	Sam Perkins	F, C	1980–1984
2019	Bobby Jones	F	1971–1974 (Note: Bobby Jones was inducted into the Naismath Hall of Fame in 2019, but has not been inducted into the College Basketball Hall of Fame)
2020	Antawn Jamison	F	1995–1998
2022	Larry Miller	F	1965–1968
2023	Tyler Hansbrough	F, C	2005–2009
2024	Vince Carter	G	1995–1998 (Note: Vince Carter was inducted into the Naismath Hall of Fame in 2024, but has not been inducted into the College Basketball Hall of Fame)
2024	Lennie Rosenbluth	F	1954–1967

Coaches inducted
Inducted	Coach	At UNC
2002	Larry Brown	1965–1967
1970	Ben Carnevale	1944–1946
1977	Frank McGuire	1952–1961
1983	Dean Smith	1958–1997
2007	Roy Williams	1978–1988, 2003–2021

== University honored players ==
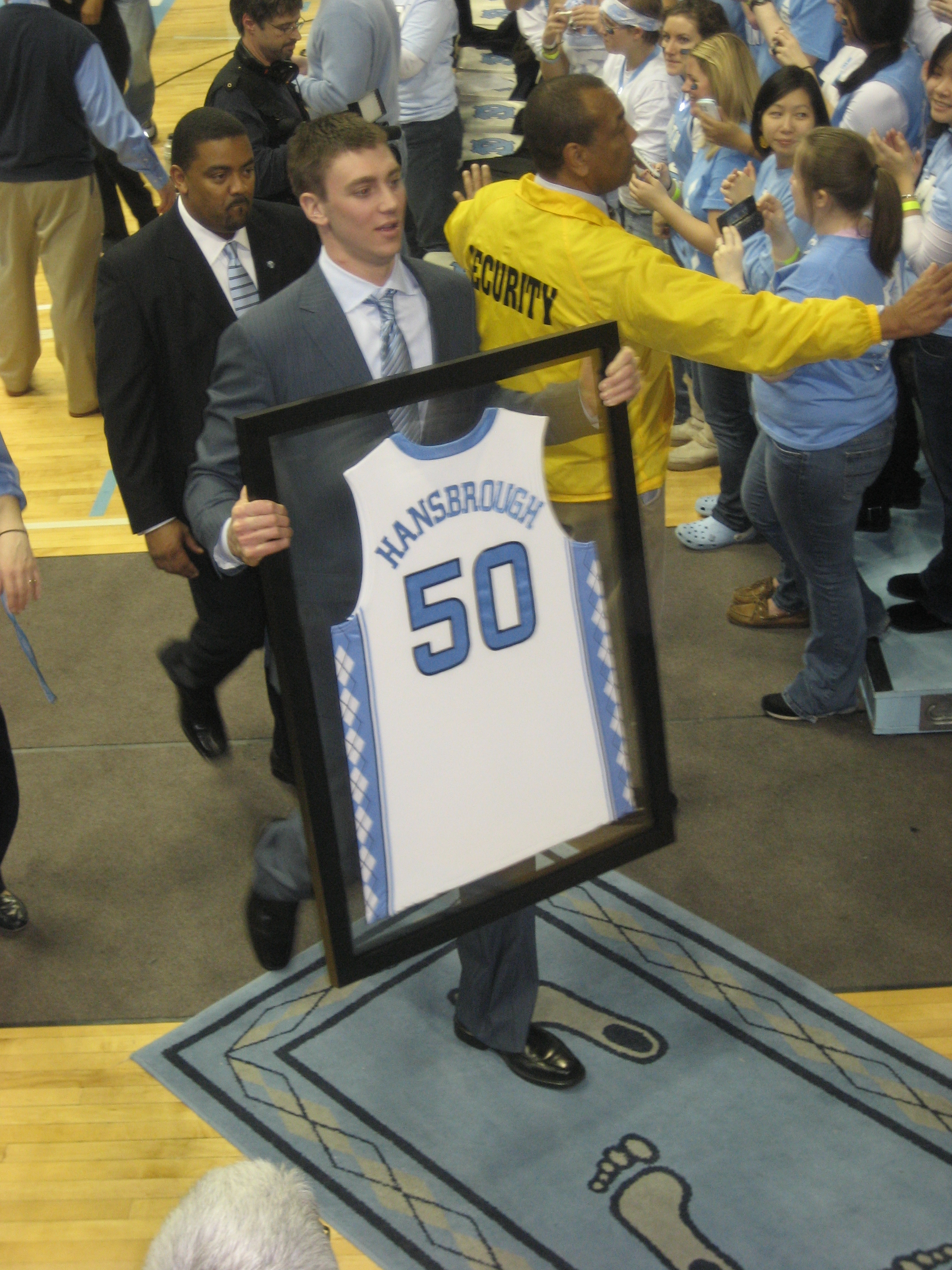
Tyler Hansbrough walking back to the players' tunnel after his jersey retirement ceremony on February 10, 2010.

When the Dean Smith Center first opened twelve jerseys were placed in the rafters of the arena on September 6, 1986 when the venue was dedicated. The original criteria was a player having been named a National Player of the Year or named twice to the All-American first team. A thirteenth jersey was added in 1987 for Kenny Smith. Prior to the start of the 1994–95 season it was decided by the Athletic Council of the University on October 4, 1994 to expand criteria for players to qualify for their jerseys to be honored in the rafters. These changes allowed for twenty more jerseys to be placed in the rafters, which was done on November 29, 1994 at the half-time of a game against Pittsburgh Panthers.

The expanded and current criteria that qualifies for honoring if he receives one or more of the following five awards:

- First- or second-team All-America on one of the major All-American teams that qualify a player for a consensus All-American designation
- ACC Player of the Year
- The Most Valuable Player of a National Championship-winning team (as voted by coaches and teammates)
- The NCAA basketball tournament Most Outstanding Player of a Final Four team
- Winning a gold medal in basketball at the Olympics.

Additionally, a player can also achieve the even greater honor of having his jersey and number permanently retired by the University of North Carolina. To attain jersey retirement, a Tar Heel must win one or more of the following six national player of the year awards: Associated Press, National Association of Basketball Coaches, Sporting News, John R. Wooden Award, Oscar Robertson Trophy, or the Naismith College Player of the Year. The (now defunct) Helms Foundation College Basketball Player of the Year award formerly served as a seventh option. The most recent player to merit bestowal of this honor is Tyler Hansbrough, who won all six of the national player of the year awards in his 2007–08 season.

Key
Player's jersey number is of retired

For a guide to the abbreviations used, see the glossary.

Honored players
Jersey no.	Name	Years played	Criteria met
NC	Cartwright Carmichael	1921–24	First-team All-America
NC	Jack Cobb	1923–26	National Player of the Year
20	George Glamack	1938–41	National Player of the Year, First-team All-America
8	Jim Jordan	1944–46	Second-team All-America
13	John "Hook" Dillon	1945–48	First-team All-America
10	Lennie Rosenbluth	1954–57	National Player of the Year, First-team All-America, ACC Player of the Year
35	Pete Brennan	1955–58	First-team All-America, ACC Player of the Year
40	Tommy Kearns	1955–58	Second-team All-America
12	Lee Shaffer	1957–60	First-team All-America, ACC Player of the Year
22	York Larese	1958–61	Second-team All-America
35	Doug Moe	1958–61	First-team All-America
11	Larry Brown	1960–63	Olympic gold medal
32	Billy Cunningham	1962–65	First-team All-America, ACC Player of the Year
22	Bob Lewis	1964–67	First-team All-America
44	Larry Miller	1965–68	First-team All-America, ACC Player of the Year
33	Charlie Scott	1967–70	Olympic gold medal, First-team All-America
31	Bill Chamberlain	1969–72	Second-team All-America
44	Dennis Wuycik	1969–72	First-team All-America
35	Bob McAdoo	1971–72	First-team All-America
34	Bobby Jones	1971–74	First-team All-America
21	Mitch Kupchak	1972–76	First-team All-America, ACC Player of the Year, Olympic gold medal
24	Walter Davis	1973–77	Olympic gold medal
45	Tommy LaGarde	1973–77	Olympic gold medal, Second-team All-America
12	Phil Ford	1974–78	National Player of the Year, First-team All-America, ACC Player of the Year, Olympic gold medal
31	Mike O'Koren	1976–80	First-team All-America
30	Al Wood	1977–81	Second-team All-America
52	James Worthy	1979–82	National Player of the Year, First Team All-America, MVP of NCAA champions, NCAA Tournament MOP
41	Sam Perkins	1980–84	Olympic gold medal, First-team All-America
23	Michael Jordan	1981–84	National Player of the Year, First Team All-America, ACC Player of the Year, Olympic gold medal
42	Brad Daugherty	1982–86	First-team All-America
30	Kenny Smith	1983–87	First-team All-America
34	J.R. Reid	1986–89	First-team All-America
34	George Lynch	1989–93	MVP of NCAA Champions
00	Eric Montross	1990–94	Second-team All-America
21	Donald Williams	1991–95	NCAA Tournament MOP
42	Jerry Stackhouse	1993–95	First-team All-America
30	Rasheed Wallace	1993–95	Second-team All-America
15	Vince Carter	1995–98	Second-team All-America, Olympic gold medal
33	Antawn Jamison	1995–98	National Player of the Year, First Team All-America, ACC Player of the Year
00	Brendan Haywood	1997–2001	Second-team All-America
40	Joseph Forte	1999–2001	First-team All-America, ACC Player of the Year
2	Raymond Felton	2002–05	MVP of NCAA Champions
42	Sean May	2002–05	First-team All-America, MVP of NCAA Champions, NCAA Tournament MOP
32	Rashad McCants	2002–05	Second-team All-America
50	Tyler Hansbrough	2005–09	National Player of the Year, First Team All-America, ACC Player of the Year, MVP of NCAA Champions
5	Ty Lawson	2006–09	Second-team All-America, ACC Player of the Year, MVP of NCAA Champions
22	Wayne Ellington	2006–09	NCAA Tournament MOP
44	Tyler Zeller	2008–12	Second-team All-America, ACC Player of the Year
40	Harrison Barnes	2010–12	Second-team All-America, Olympic gold medal
5	Marcus Paige	2012–16	Second-team All-America
11	Brice Johnson	2012–16	First-team All-America
44	Justin Jackson	2014–17	First-team All-America, ACC Player of the Year, MVP of NCAA Champions
2	Joel Berry	2014–18	NCAA Tournament MOP
4	R. J. Davis	2020–25	First-team All-America, ACC Player of the Year
8	Caleb Wilson	2025–26	Second-team All-America

== Glossary ==
Abbreviations
Positions		Selectors							
G	Guard	ABA	ABAUSA	AP	Associated Press	AW	American Weekly	BA	Basketball America
F	Forward	BN	Basketball News	BT	Basketball Times	BW	Basketball Weekly	CBS	CBS
C	Center	CBSS	CBS Sportline	CNVR	Converse	COL	Collier's Weekly	CP	Central Press Association
		ESPN	ESPN	FOX	FOX	HLMS	Helms Foundation	INS	International News Service
		JW	John Wooden Team	NABC	National Association of Basketball Coaches	NAIS	Naismith	NBACO	NBA Coaches
		NEA	Newspaper Enterprise Association	RA	Rupp Award	SI	Sports Illustrated	TSN	The Sporting News
		UP	United Press	UPI	United Press International	USBWA	United States Basketball Writers Association		
