= Sylvester Williams =

Sylvester Williams may refer to:

- Sylvester Williams (American football) (born 1988), American football player
- Sly Williams (born 1958), Sylvester "Sly" Williams, basketball player
- Sylvester Williams (actor), played Mick McFarlane in EastEnders
- Henry Sylvester Williams (1869–1911), Trinidadian barrister, British local government councillor, and Pan-African campaigner
