= 1978 NCAA Men's Basketball All-Americans =

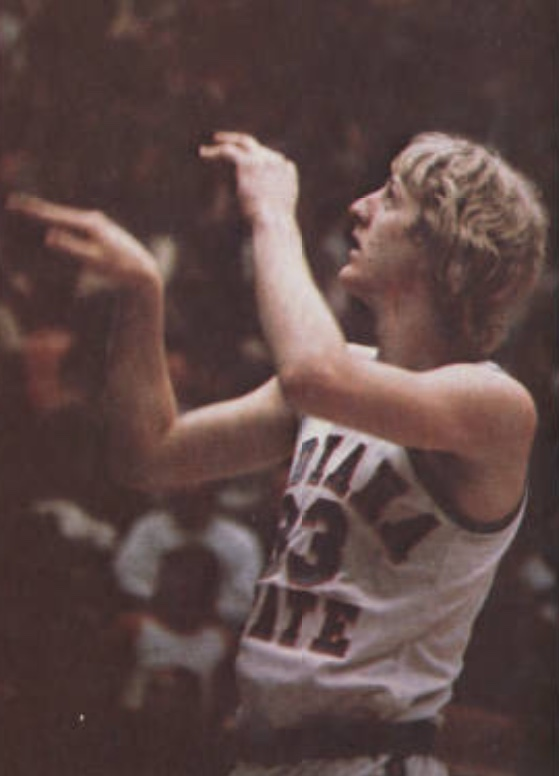
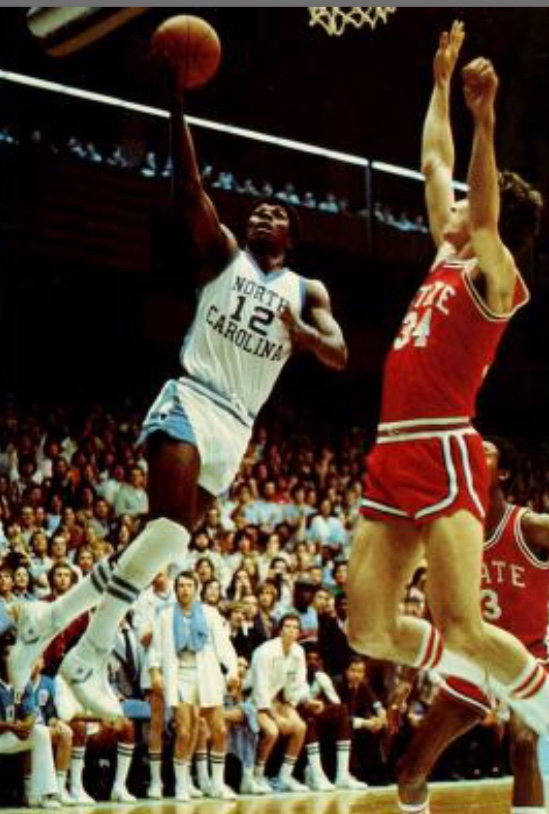
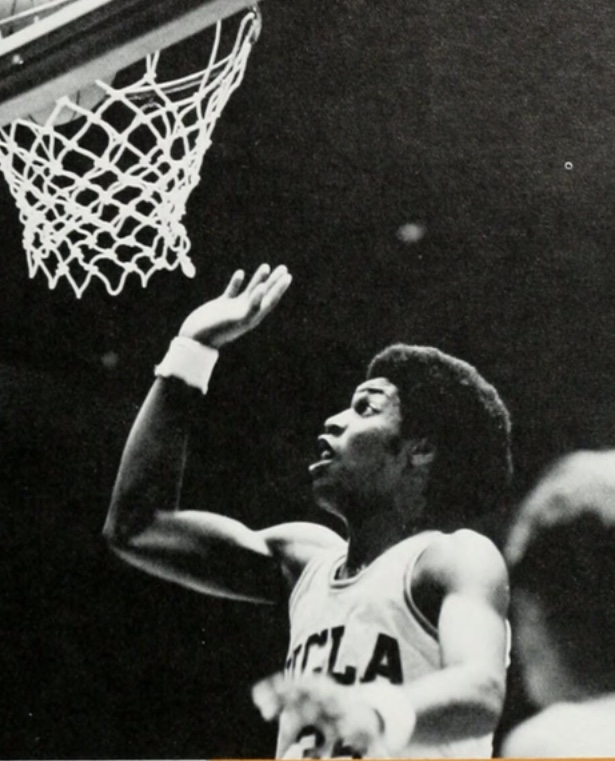
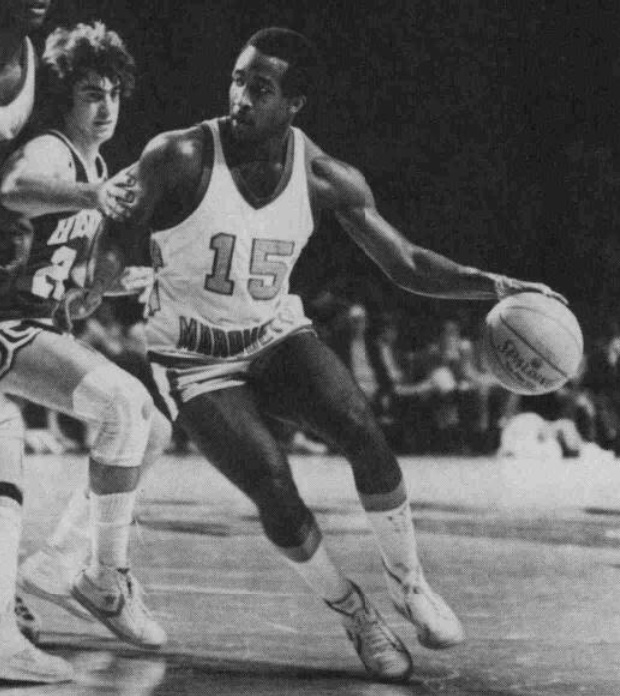
- Members of the 1978 Consensus All-America first team. Clockwise from upper left: Larry Bird, Phil Ford, Butch Lee and David Greenwood (not pictured: Mychal Thompson).
- Awarded for: 1977–78 NCAA Division I men's basketball season

The consensus 1978 College Basketball All-American team, as determined by aggregating the results of four major All-American teams. To earn "consensus" status, a player must win honors from a majority of the following teams: the Associated Press, the USBWA, The United Press International and the National Association of Basketball Coaches.

== 1978 Consensus All-America team ==
Consensus First Team
Player	Position	Class	Team
Larry Bird	F	Junior	Indiana State
Phil Ford	G	Senior	North Carolina
David Greenwood	F	Junior	UCLA
Butch Lee	G	Senior	Marquette
Mychal Thompson	F/C	Senior	Minnesota

Consensus Second Team
Player	Position	Class	Team
Ron Brewer	G	Senior	Arkansas
Jack Givens	G/F	Senior	Kentucky
Rod Griffin	G	Senior	Wake Forest
Rick Robey	F/C	Senior	Kentucky
Freeman Williams	G	Senior	Portland State

== Individual All-America teams ==
All-America Team
All-America Team	First team		Second team		Third team	
All-America Team	Player	School	Player	School	Player	School
Associated Press	Larry Bird	Indiana State	Ron Brewer	Arkansas	Mike Evans	Kansas State
Associated Press	Phil Ford	North Carolina	Dave Corzine	DePaul	Rod Griffin	Wake Forest
Associated Press	David Greenwood	UCLA	Jack Givens	Kentucky	Magic Johnson	Michigan State
Associated Press	Butch Lee	Marquette	Reggie King	Alabama	Sidney Moncrief	Arkansas
Associated Press	Mychal Thompson	Minnesota	Freeman Williams	Portland State	Rick Robey	Kentucky
USBWA	Ron Brewer	Arkansas	Larry Bird	Indiana State	No third team	
USBWA	Michael Cooper	New Mexico	Jack Givens	Kentucky	No third team	
USBWA	Phil Ford	North Carolina	David Greenwood	UCLA	No third team	
USBWA	Butch Lee	Marquette	Rod Griffin	Wake Forest	No third team	
USBWA	Freeman Williams	Portland State	Mychal Thompson	Minnesota	No third team	
NABC	Larry Bird	Indiana State	Dave Corzine	DePaul	James Bailey	Rutgers
NABC	Phil Ford	North Carolina	Jack Givens	Kentucky	Winford Boynes	San Francisco
NABC	David Greenwood	UCLA	Rod Griffin	Wake Forest	Sidney Moncrief	Arkansas
NABC	Butch Lee	Marquette	Magic Johnson	Michigan State	Mike O'Koren	North Carolina
NABC	Rick Robey	Kentucky	Freeman Williams	Portland State	Jerome Whitehead	Marquette
UPI	Larry Bird	Indiana State	James Bailey	Rutgers	Dave Corzine	DePaul
UPI	Phil Ford	North Carolina	Jack Givens	Kentucky	Rod Griffin	Wake Forest
UPI	David Greenwood	UCLA	Sidney Moncrief	Arkansas	Magic Johnson	Michigan State
UPI	Butch Lee	Marquette	Rick Robey	Kentucky	Kyle Macy	Kentucky
UPI	Mychal Thompson	Minnesota	Freeman Williams	Portland State	Roger Phegley	Bradley

AP Honorable Mention:

- Clyde Austin, NC State
- James Bailey, Rutgers
- Gene Banks, Duke
- Ron Baxter, Texas
- Roosevelt Bouie, Syracuse
- Winford Boynes, San Francisco
- James Bradley, Memphis State
- Michael Brooks, La Salle
- Marty Byrnes, Syracuse
- Bruce Campbell, Providence
- Ron Carter, VMI
- Bill Cartwright, San Francisco
- Pat Cummings, Cincinnati
- Harry Davis, Florida State
- Marvin Delph, Arkansas
- Sherman Dillard, James Madison
- Sammy Drummer, Georgia Tech
- John Duren, Georgetown
- John Gerdy, Davidson
- Mike Gminski, Duke
- Steve Grant, Manhattan
- Darrell Griffith, Louisville
- James Hardy, San Francisco
- Keith Herron, Villanova
- Marc Iavaroni, Virginia
- Derrick Jackson, Georgetown
- Frank Johnson, Wake Forest
- George Johnson, St. John's
- Lynbert Johnson, Wichita State
- Marvin Johnson, New Mexico
- Jeff Judkins, Utah
- Jim Krivacs, Texas
- Jeff Lamp, Virginia
- Billy Lewis, Illinois State
- John Long, Detroit
- John Lowenhaupt, William & Mary
- Oliver Mack, East Carolina
- Kyle Macy, Kentucky
- Lew Massey, Charlotte
- Robert Miller, Cincinnati
- Mike Mitchell, Auburn
- Johnny Moore, Texas
- Jonathan Moore, Furman
- Lowes Moore, West Virginia
- Calvin Natt, Northeast Louisiana
- Mike O'Koren, North Carolina
- Ron Perry, Holy Cross
- Roger Phegley, Bradley
- Mike Phillips, Kentucky
- Micheal Ray Richardson, Montana
- Mike Russell, Texas Tech
- Frankie Sanders, Southern
- Greg Sanders, St. Bonaventure
- Mike Santos, Utah State
- Purvis Short, Jackson State
- Arthur Snipe, South Carolina State
- Jim Spanarkel, Duke
- Henry Taylor, Texas–Pan American
- Reggie Theus, UNLV
- Andrew Toney, Southwestern Louisiana
- Raymond Townsend, UCLA
- Greg Tynes, Seton Hall
- Dean Uthoff, Iowa State
- Darnell Valentine, Kansas
- Ren Watson, VCU
- Jerome Whitehead, Marquette
- Hawkeye Whitney, NC State
- Duck Williams, Notre Dame
- Ken Williams, North Texas
- Rick Wilson, Louisville
- Gary Winton, Army

== See also ==
- 1977–78 NCAA Division I men's basketball season
