= Jim Spanarkel =

American basketball player (born 1957)

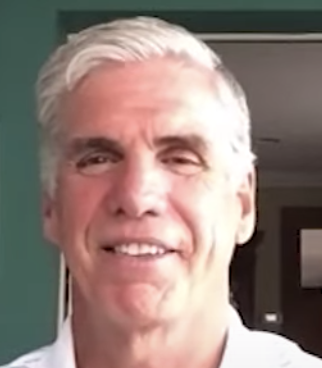
- Spanarkel in 2020

Personal information
- Born: June 28, 1957 (age 69) Jersey City, New Jersey, U.S.
- Listed height: 6 ft 5 in (1.96 m)
- Listed weight: 190 lb (86 kg)

Career information
- High school: Hudson Catholic (Jersey City, New Jersey)
- College: Duke (1975–1979)
- NBA draft: 1979: 1st round, 16th overall pick
- Drafted by: Philadelphia 76ers
- Playing career: 1979–1984
- Position: Shooting guard / small forward
- Number: 34, 33

Career history
- 1979–1980: Philadelphia 76ers
- 1980–1984: Dallas Mavericks

Career highlights
- Consensus second-team All-American (1979); 2× First-team All-ACC (1978, 1979); Second-team All-ACC (1977); ACC Rookie of the Year (1976)

Career NBA statistics
- Points: 2,505 (9.7 ppg)
- Rebounds: 652 (2.5 rpg)
- Assists: 572 (2.2 apg)
- Stats at NBA.com
- Stats at Basketball Reference

James Gerard Spanarkel (born June 28, 1957) is an American television analyst for College Basketball on CBS and Fox College Hoops. He is a former professional basketball player for the Philadelphia 76ers and the Dallas Mavericks. He played college basketball for Duke University, where he was an All-American.

== Career ==
=== High school ===
Born and raised in Jersey City, New Jersey, Spanarkel played at Hudson Catholic Regional High School, where he was a teammate of future NBA player Mike O'Koren.

=== College and professional basketball ===
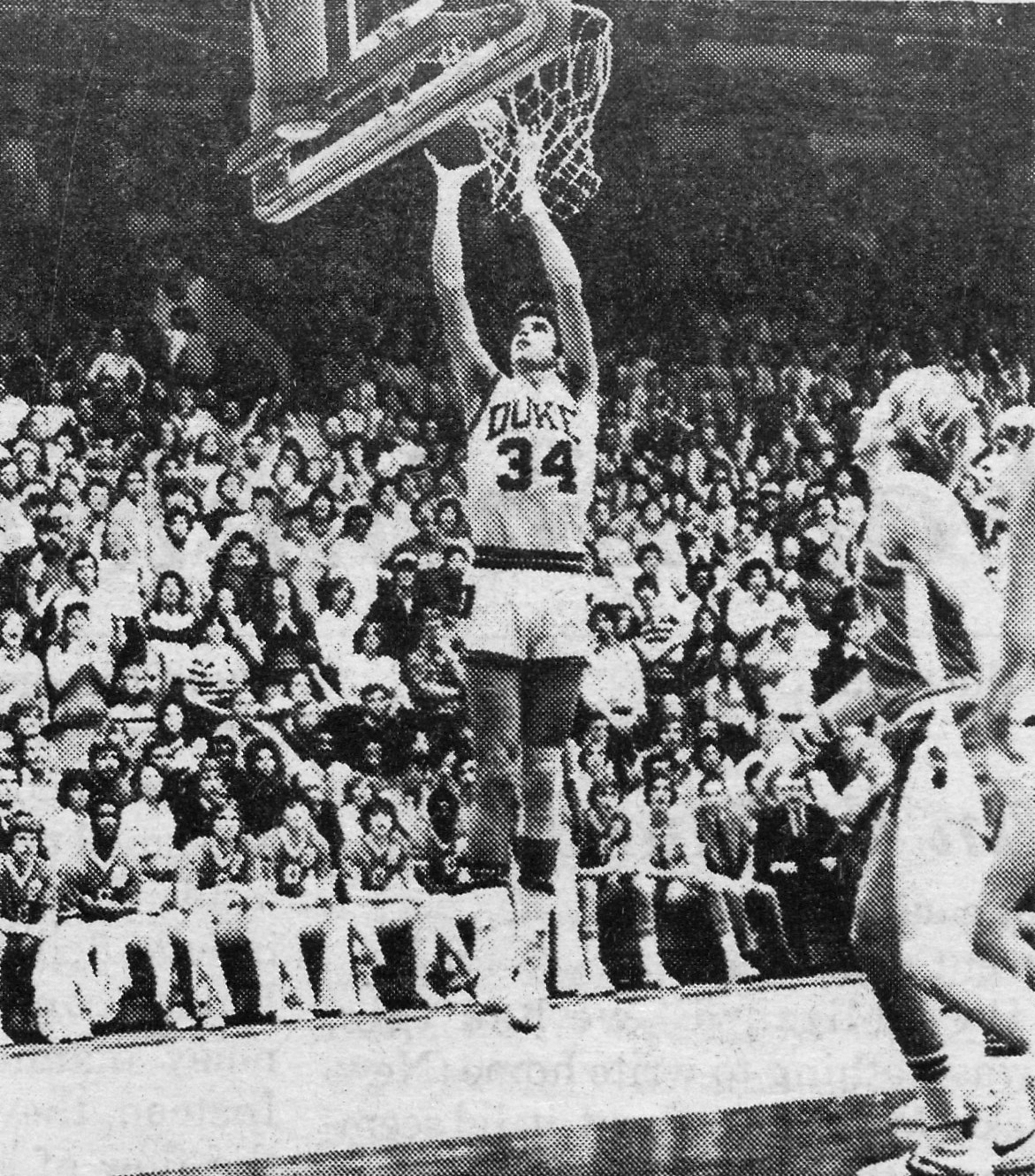
Spanarkel playing for Duke in 1979

Spanarkel was a First Team Acclaim All American, in addition the First Team All-ACC and the first 2000-point scorer in Duke Blue Devils history. He was named Duke's team MVP for his final three seasons, 1977, 1978, and 1979. Spanarkel was also team captain in his junior and senior years, and was announced NCAA's East Regional Most Outstanding Player in 1978. Duke finished as the national runner-up that year to Kentucky. At Duke, Spanarkel was also a pitcher on the baseball team for two years. He graduated from university in 1979, and during the summer of 1980, he studied for and obtained a real estate broker's license.

The Philadelphia 76ers drafted Spanarkel with the 16th overall pick in the 1979 NBA draft on October 17, and he spent his first season as a rookie, the 1979–80 campaign, with the Sixers. He was then drafted by the Dallas Mavericks and played the following four seasons with them, leading the club in scoring for the 1980–81 season with a 14.4 ppg average. His NBA career ended in 1984, after a season during which a broken right wrist cost him three months on the bench.

=== American broadcaster ===
Spanarkel worked 30 years as Nets television analyst (currently on the YES Network), both with Ian Eagle courtside as a color commentator and more recently as a studio host during pre and post-game. Spanarkel was terminated by YES prior to the 2020–21 season.

Currently, he works CBS Sports' regular season and postseason coverage with Spero Dedes.

He joined CBS in early 1998 and worked first and second round tournament games with his Nets partner, Ian Eagle. He subsequently worked the next 17 tournaments with Eagle. Starting with the 2015 tournament, Spanarkel moved up to a regional weekend crew, joining Verne Lundquist to work Sweet Sixteen and Elite Eight games for the first time. Lundquist retired from college basketball after the 2017 tournament, and Spanarkel was reunited with Eagle. In 2024 Eagle replaced Jim Nantz on the lead crew and Spanarkel was paired with Dedes, working First Four and first and second round games.

In addition to his work with CBS, he works primarily Big East Conference regular season games on FOX Sports.

He was previously a studio analyst for NBA TV. During his entire broadcasting career, he has provided basketball coverage on CBS Sports, ESPN, Fox Sports, and YES. In 2013, Spanarkel called the international telecasts of the 2013 NBA Finals alongside Eagle. He has also been chief commentator for the Travers Cups and various member guest tournaments at Upper Montclair.

== Personal life ==
Spanarkel is married to Janet, and the couple has four children, James, Bridget, Stephanie, and Andrew. He is currently a First Vice President and a certified financial planner at Merrill Lynch in New Jersey.

Spanarkel has been a resident of Rutherford, New Jersey.

== Career statistics ==
Legend
GP	Games played	GS	Games started	MPG	Minutes per game
FG%	Field goal percentage	3P%	3-point field goal percentage	FT%	Free throw percentage
RPG	Rebounds per game	APG	Assists per game	SPG	Steals per game
BPG	Blocks per game	PPG	Points per game	**Bold**	Career high

=== NBA ===
==== Regular season ====
Year	Team	GP	GS	MPG	FG%	3P%	FT%	RPG	APG	SPG	BPG	PPG
1979–80	Philadelphia	40	0	11.1	'.471	.000	.831	1.4	1.3	.3	**.2**	5.0
1980–81	Dallas	**82**		**28.3**	.467	.100	**.887**	**3.6**	**2.8**	**1.4**	**.2**	**14.4**
1981–82	Dallas	**82**	1	21.4	**.479**	.333	.853	2.6	2.5	1.0	.1	10.1
1982–83	Dallas	48	**4**	15.0	.462	.200	.779	1.8	1.6	.6	.1	5.7
1983–84	Dallas	7	0	7.7	.438	**.500**	.692	1.0	.7	.9	.0	3.4
Career		259	5	20.4	.470	.250	.855	2.5	2.2	1.0	.1	9.7

==== Playoffs ====
Year	Team	GP	MPG	FG%	3P%	FT%	RPG	APG	SPG	BPG	PPG
1980	Philadelphia	5	1.6	.000	–	1.000	.2	.2	.0	.0	.4

== Honors ==
- In 1990, Jim Spanarkel was inducted into the Duke Sports Hall of Fame.
- In 2001, Spanarkel was inducted into the Duke Circle of Honor.
- Jim Spanarkel was inducted into the UPI First Team All-America: 1979.
- He was inducted second into the All-ACC Team.
- MVP of All-ACC Tournament teams in 1978; 1979.
- He was the ACC Freshman of the year in 1976 for Duke.
- He has the NCAA East Regional MOP: 1978.
- He was the All-NCAA Tournament's Most Outstanding Player.
- Sparnakel was GTE Academic All-Americans consecutively in 1978 and 1979.
- James was team captain in 1978–1979.
- Won the Swett Memorial Trophy (Duke MVP) three years in a row: 1977, 1978, and 1979.
- In 2014, won the New York Emmy Award for Best Sports Analyst for the YES Network broadcasts of Brooklyn Nets games.
