= Ty Lawson =

American basketball player (born 1987)

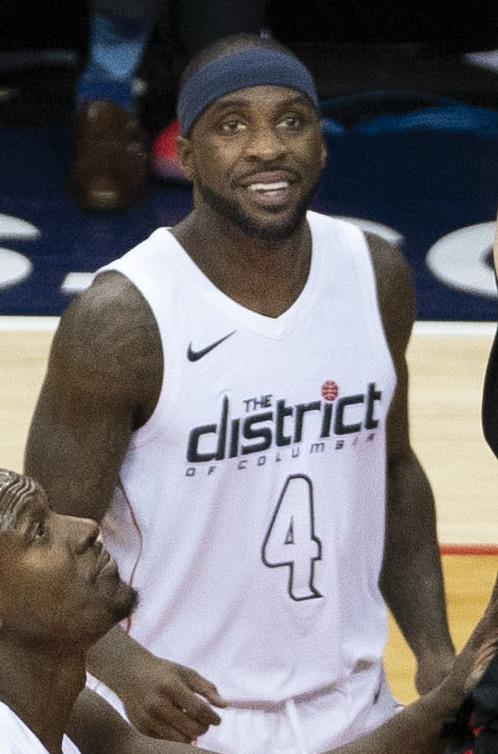
- Lawson with the Washington Wizards in 2018

Personal information
- Born: November 3, 1987 (age 39) Clinton, Maryland, U.S.
- Listed height: 5 ft 11 in (1.80 m)
- Listed weight: 194 lb (88 kg)

Career information
- High school: Bishop McNamara (Forestville, Maryland); Oak Hill Academy (Mouth of Wilson, Virginia)
- College: North Carolina (2006–2009)
- NBA draft: 2009: 1st round, 18th overall pick
- Drafted by: Minnesota Timberwolves
- Playing career: 2009–2023
- Position: Point guard
- Number: 3, 10, 4, 1, 55

Career history
- 2009–2015: Denver Nuggets
- 2011: BC Žalgiris
- 2015–2016: Houston Rockets
- 2016: Indiana Pacers
- 2016–2017: Sacramento Kings
- 2017–2018: Shandong Golden Stars
- 2018: Washington Wizards
- 2018–2019: Shandong Golden Stars
- 2019–2020: Fujian Sturgeons
- 2020–2021: Kolossos Rodou
- 2021–2022: US Monastir
- 2023: Gaiteros del Zulia

Career highlights
- NCAA champion (2009); Consensus second-team All-American (2009); Bob Cousy Award (2009); ACC Player of the Year (2009); First-team All-ACC (2009); ACC All-Freshman team (2007); No. 5 honored by North Carolina Tar Heels; McDonald's All-American (2006); First-team Parade All-American (2006)
- Stats at NBA.com
- Stats at Basketball Reference

Tywon Ronell Lawson (born November 3, 1987) is an American former professional basketball player who played as a point guard. He played college basketball for the North Carolina Tar Heels where he won the 2009 national championship his junior year. Lawson was selected with the 18th overall pick in the 2009 NBA draft by the Minnesota Timberwolves and was immediately traded to the Denver Nuggets. He played six seasons for the Nuggets and later played for the Houston Rockets, Indiana Pacers, Sacramento Kings and the Washington Wizards.

Lawson also played three seasons in the Chinese Basketball Association (CBA) for the Shandong Golden Stars and Fujian Sturgeons, and spent his final season in Venezuela with the Gaiteros del Zulia.

== Early life ==
Lawson attended sixth and seventh grade at Gwynn Park Middle School in Prince George's County, Maryland. In the eighth grade, he was recruited to the Newport School in Kensington, Maryland.

Lawson attended Bishop McNamara High School in Forestville, Maryland from 2003 to 2004. He later transferred to and graduated from Oak Hill Academy in Virginia, where he was a first-team USA Today and Parade All-American. He participated in the McDonald's All-American Game, Jordan Classic and the Nike Hoop Summit. During Lawson's senior year at Oak Hill Academy, he averaged 23.8 points, 9.1 assists and five steals. His highest scoring game in high school was 55 points.

== College career ==
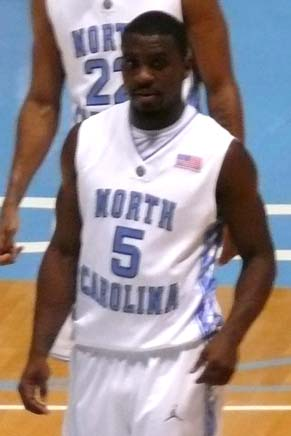
Lawson while at North Carolina

Lawson began playing for the University of North Carolina Tar Heels in the 2006–07 season. In 38 games, he led the Tar Heels with 5.6 assists per game and was fourth with 10.2 points per game, during which time he helped the Tar Heels win a share of the Atlantic Coast Conference regular season title, as well as the ACC tournament. During his sophomore year, he averaged 12.7 points and 5.3 assists per game, although he saw much less playing time due to an ankle sprain that kept him out much of the season. In spite of this nagging injury, he eventually returned to help Carolina repeat as both ACC regular season and tournament champions and ultimately earn a berth to the Final Four.

He was charged with driving after drinking on June 6, 2008, by a police officer who felt that Lawson's music was too loud. He was not charged with a DWI because he was below the legal limit of .08 BAC, but still received misdemeanors due to state law prohibiting anyone under the age of 21 from driving after drinking any amount of alcohol. He was also charged for driving with a suspended license.

On the day of the deadline to withdraw from the June 16 2008 NBA draft, Lawson decided to return to North Carolina for his junior season, along with Wayne Ellington, Danny Green and All-American Tyler Hansbrough, who all spurned the NBA draft to return to UNC, leaving the starters for the 2007–08 season intact for the 2008–09 season.

Lawson was voted to the All-ACC First Team his junior year and was named the ACC Player of the Year, the first time a point guard had won the ACC's highest honor since fellow Tar Heel Phil Ford won the award in 1978. Lawson was also a consensus second-team all-American as a junior, making him eligible to have his jersey honored in the rafters of the Smith Center at the conclusion of his college career. In 2009, Lawson also won the Bob Cousy Award that honors the best collegiate point guard. During the 2009 NCAA Tournament championship game, he also set a record with 8 steals against Michigan State, giving him the most steals of any player in an NCAA championship game and helping lead the Tar Heels to a national title.

On April 23, 2009, Lawson announced his decision to forgo his senior season and enter the 2009 NBA draft.

== Professional career ==
=== Denver Nuggets (2009–2015) ===
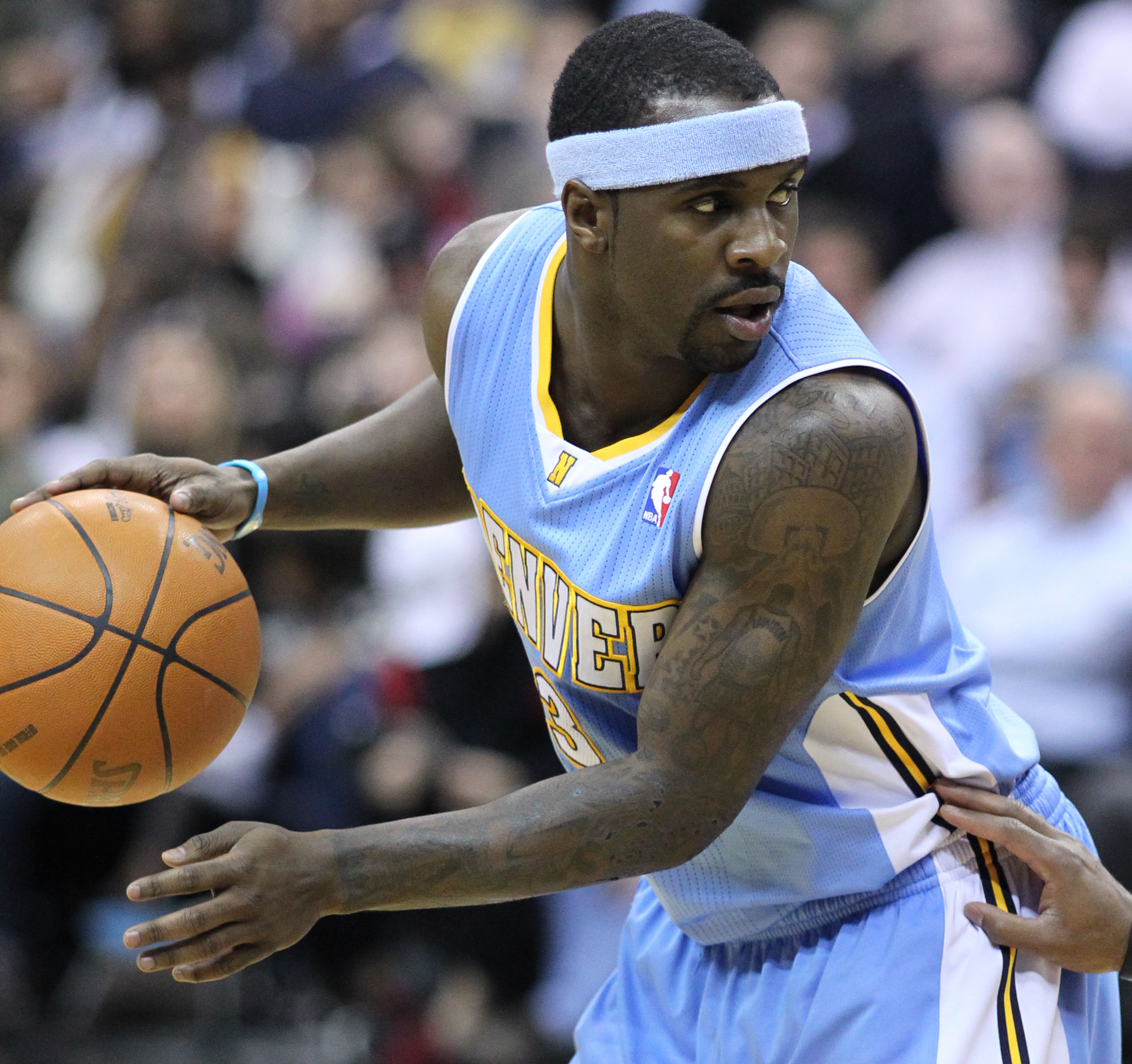
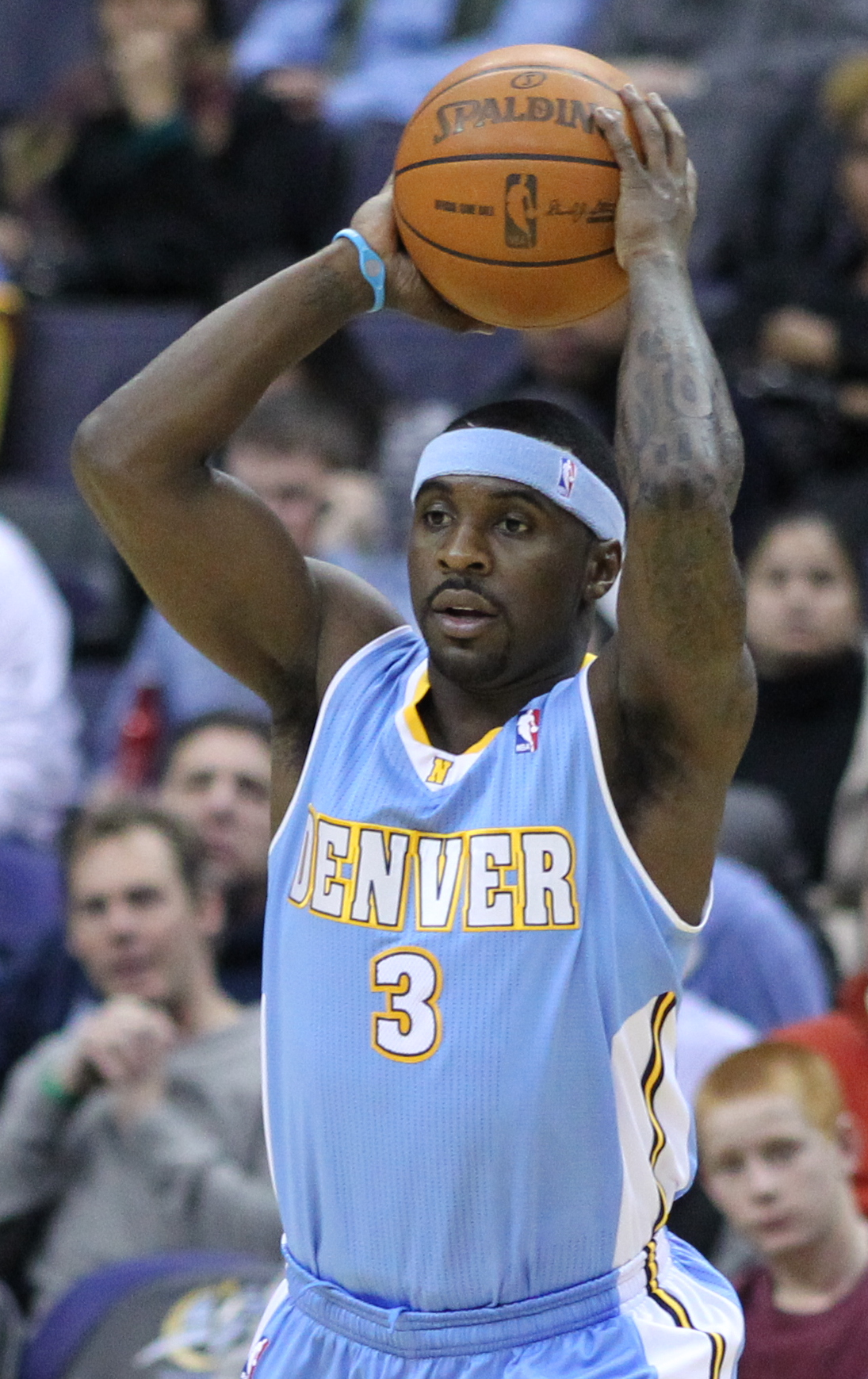
Lawson with the Nuggets in 2011

Due to concerns of his height and his often-sprained ankle, Lawson slipped to 18th in the 2009 NBA draft, where he was drafted by the Minnesota Timberwolves. However, they had already drafted two point guards, making Lawson expendable. This gave the Denver Nuggets an opportunity to get a quality player as they traded their future draft pick to Minnesota in exchange for Lawson. Lawson served as a backup to Chauncey Billups for one and a half seasons until Billups was traded to the New York Knicks on February 22, 2011, as part of a trade which also sent star forward Carmelo Anthony to New York. On April 9, 2011, Lawson became the first player in NBA history to make his first 10 three-point attempts to start a game. He went 10-of-11 from behind three-point range and finished the game with a career-high 37 points, 7 rebounds, and 6 assists.

On August 15, 2011, Lawson signed a one-year contract with Žalgiris Kaunas. The deal included an out-clause that allowed him to return to the Denver Nuggets when the 2011 NBA lockout ended. Lawson played seven Euroleague games during his stint in Kaunas, averaging 7.4 points, 3.0 rebounds and 1.6 assists.

In 2012–13, the Nuggets finished with a franchise-best record of 57–25 and earned the third seed in the Western Conference. However, they were eliminated in the first round of the playoffs by the Golden State Warriors. Lawson led Denver in both scoring and assists for the series with averages of 21.3 points and 8.0 assists.

In 2013–14, with Danilo Gallinari out injured with a torn ACL, Lawson led the team in points, assists and steals.

The Nuggets' 2014–15 season took a turn for the worse with their record dropping to a dismal 30–52, good for the ninth-worst win–loss record in Nuggets history, and had a coaching change mid-season with Brian Shaw being replaced by Melvin Hunt. Despite the turmoil, Lawson managed to have a solid season with 15.2 points and a career-high 9.6 assists per game. His 720 total assists broke the Nuggets' single-season assists record of 714 held by Nick Van Exel.

=== Houston Rockets (2015–2016) ===
On July 20, 2015, the Nuggets traded Lawson and a 2017 second round draft pick to the Houston Rockets in exchange for Joey Dorsey, Nick Johnson, Kostas Papanikolaou, Pablo Prigioni, a 2016 first round draft pick, and cash considerations. He made his debut for the Rockets in the team's season opener against his former team the Denver Nuggets on October 28, recording 12 points and 6 assists as a starter in a 105–85 loss. He started in the Rockets' first 11 games of the season under coach Kevin McHale. However, after McHale was fired and J. B. Bickerstaff was named interim, Bickerstaff moved Lawson to the bench for the team's November 18 game against the Portland Trail Blazers. On December 18, he was suspended for two games by the NBA based on his guilty plea in November for driving while impaired and a lane usage violation after leaving a party in Denver in January 2015. On January 7, 2016, he was suspended for a further three games by the NBA for driving under the influence of alcohol in July 2015. On March 1, he was waived by the Rockets in a buyout agreement.

=== Indiana Pacers (2016) ===
On March 7, 2016, Lawson signed with the Indiana Pacers. He made his debut for the Pacers later that night at home against the San Antonio Spurs, managing just five minutes of action before spraining his left ankle during the second quarter, which ruled him out for the rest of the game. He missed the following five games before returning to action on March 21 against the Philadelphia 76ers.

=== Sacramento Kings (2016–2017) ===
On August 31, 2016, Lawson signed with the Sacramento Kings. On April 11, 2017, in his 551st and final NBA regular season game, Lawson recorded his first career triple-double with 22 points, 12 assists and 11 rebounds in a 129–104 win over the Phoenix Suns.

=== Shandong Golden Stars (2017–2018) ===
On August 9, 2017, Lawson signed a one-year, $2.4 million contract with the Shandong Golden Stars of the Chinese Basketball Association. In 46 games for Shandong, he averaged 25.5 points, 4.6 rebounds, 6.5 assists and 2.2 steals per game.

=== Washington Wizards (2018) ===
On April 12, 2018, Lawson signed with the Washington Wizards for the 2018 NBA Playoffs. Lawson's Wizards debut came in game 2 of the first round series against the Toronto Raptors, where he had 14 points and 8 assists in a Wizards defeat. Washington would go on to lose in six games, with Lawson averaging 5.8 points and 3.0 assists in 19.2 minutes per game.

=== Return to the Golden Stars (2018–2019) ===
On December 15, 2018, Lawson returned and signed with the Shandong Golden Stars.

=== Fujian Sturgeons (2019–2020) ===
In September 2019, Lawson signed with the Fujian Sturgeons for the 2019–20 Chinese Basketball Association season. He had 22 points in the season opener.

On September 19, 2020, Lawson was cut by the Sturgeons over "inappropriate" social media posts detrimental to the team.

=== Kolossos Rodou (2020–2021) ===
On December 30, 2020, Lawson signed with Kolossos Rodou of the Greek Basket League. However, due to travel issues, he was unable to join the team until May 2021. He practiced with the team to finish then 2020–21 season and re-signed for the 2021–22 season, but after just one Greek Cup game in September 2021, he parted ways with Kolossos Rodou.

=== US Monastir (2021–2022) ===
In November 2021, Lawson signed with US Monastir of the Championnat National A. He left the team prior to the Basketball Africa League tournament.

=== Gaiteros del Zulia (2023) ===
In February 2023, Lawson signed with Gaiteros del Zulia of the Venezuelan Basketball League. On April 4, 2023, Lawson was fired from Gaiteros del Zulia allegedly for indiscipline even though he was having an excellent season with the team, regularly leading statistical categories. However, his off-court behavior violated team rules and organization ethics, leading to his dismissal.

== Career statistics ==
Legend
GP	Games played	GS	Games started	MPG	Minutes per game
FG%	Field-goal percentage	3P%	3-point field-goal percentage	FT%	Free-throw percentage
RPG	Rebounds per game	APG	Assists per game	SPG	Steals per game
BPG	Blocks per game	PPG	Points per game	PIR	Performance index rating
**Bold**	Career high

=== NBA ===
==== Regular season ====
Year	Team	GP	GS	MPG	FG%	3P%	FT%	RPG	APG	SPG	BPG	PPG
2009–10	Denver	65	8	20.3	**.515**	**.410**	.757	1.9	3.1	.7	.0	8.3
2010–11	Denver	**80**	31	26.3	.503	.404	.764	2.6	4.7	1.0	.1	11.7
2011–12	Denver	61	61	34.8	.488	.365	**.824**	**3.7**	6.6	1.3	.1	16.4
2012–13	Denver	73	71	34.4	.461	.366	.756	2.7	6.9	1.5	.1	16.7
2013–14	Denver	62	61	**35.9**	.431	.356	.798	3.5	8.8	**1.6**	**.2**	**17.6**
2014–15	Denver	75	**75**	35.5	.436	.341	.730	3.1	**9.6**	1.2	.1	15.2
2015–16	Houston	53	12	22.2	.387	.330	.700	1.7	3.4	.8	.1	5.8
2015–16	Indiana	13	1	18.1	.418	.357	.500	2.4	4.4	.8	.1	4.9
2016–17	Sacramento	69	24	25.1	.454	.288	.797	2.6	4.8	1.1	.1	9.9
Career		551	344	29.2	.460	.359	.770	2.7	6.0	1.2	.1	12.7

==== Playoffs ====
Year	Team	GP	GS	MPG	FG%	3P%	FT%	RPG	APG	SPG	BPG	PPG
2010	Denver	6	0	19.7	.429	.400	.684	1.3	2.7	1.0	.0	7.8
2011	Denver	5	5	33.4	.500	**.455**	**.913**	**3.4**	3.8	1.0	**.2**	15.6
2012	Denver	**7**	**7**	34.6	**.514**	.321	.632	2.6	6.0	1.0	.1	19.0
2013	Denver	6	6	**39.3**	.440	.190	.848	3.3	**8.0**	**1.7**	.0	**21.3**
2016	Indiana	**7**	0	10.6	.333	.000	.667	1.0	1.4	.4	.0	2.3
2018	Washington	5	0	19.2	.346	.625	1.000	2.6	3.0	0.6	.0	5.8
Career		36	18	25.9	.458	.333	.792	2.3	4.2	0.9	.1	12.0

=== EuroLeague ===
Year	Team	GP	GS	MPG	FG%	3P%	FT%	RPG	APG	SPG	BPG	PPG	PIR
2011–12	Žalgiris	7	4	21.2	.429	.375	.619	3.0	1.6	0.9	.0	7.4	7.9
Career		7	4	21.2	.429	.375	.619	3.0	1.6	0.9	.0	7.4	7.9

=== CBA ===
Year	Team	GP	GS	MPG	FG%	3P%	FT%	RPG	APG	SPG	BPG	PPG
2017–18	Shandong	**46**	6	**36.1**	**.548**	.401	.835	4.6	6.5	2.2	.04	25.5
2018–19	Shandong	24	2	35.0	.511	.352	**.841**	3.9	8.7	1.8	.04	26.5
2019–20	Fujian	33	**21**	35.0	.514	**.428**	.829	**5.6**	**8.8**	**2.7**	**.09**	**27.3**
Career		103	29	36.0	.528	.397	.834	4.8	7.8	2.3	.06	26.3

=== College ===
Year	Team	GP	GS	MPG	FG%	3P%	FT%	RPG	APG	SPG	BPG	PPG
2006–07	North Carolina	**38**	31	25.7	.500	.356	.688	2.9	5.6	1.5	.1	10.2
2007–08	North Carolina	32	29	25.3	.515	.361	**.835**	2.7	5.2	1.6	.0	12.7
2008–09	North Carolina	35	**35**	**29.9**	**.532**	**.472**	.798	**3.0**	**6.6**	**2.1**	.1	**16.6**
Career		105	95	27.0	.516	.402	.780	2.9	5.8	1.8	.1	13.1

== Arrests ==
Lawson has been arrested multiple times for driving under the influence (DUI). In 2008, 20-year-old Lawson pleaded guilty to underage drinking and driving after registering a .03 blood-alcohol level during a traffic stop in Chapel Hill, North Carolina. Additional charges of violating a noise ordinance and driving with a revoked or suspended license were dropped and Lawson was required only to complete 20 hours of community service.

In April 2012 in Arapahoe County, Colorado, Lawson was cited for careless driving, driving with a restricted license and permitting an unauthorized person to drive his car. Lawson was arrested in Denver on January 29, 2013, for avoiding prosecution for these offenses. He later pleaded guilty to allowing an unauthorized person to drive and the other charges were dropped.

On August 17, 2013, Lawson and his girlfriend, Ashley Pettiford, were arrested by police in Arapahoe County responding to a domestic violence call. Lawson was arrested on suspicion of committing two misdemeanors, domestic violence-related harassment and property damage. Both Lawson and Pettiford were released on $1,000 bond and charges were ultimately dropped.

On January 23, 2015, Lawson was arrested in Denver after driving almost twice the speed limit while under the influence of alcohol. In that incident, he admitted to police that he had a prior arrest for DUI in Missouri. One of the conditions of his $1,500 bond was that he not drink alcohol.

On July 14, 2015, Lawson was arrested in Los Angeles on suspicion of driving under the influence. On July 17, a Denver judge ruled that Lawson would be required to spend a month at a residential rehabilitation center before facing DUI charges in either Colorado or California.

In February 2022, Lawson was arrested in Madrid after two altercations at an airport restaurant, with Spanish newspaper Marca reporting he had thrown a glass at a customer.

On July 16, 2026, Lawson was arrested in Douglas County after allegedly stealing a bottle of vodka from a store.

== See also ==
- 2009 NCAA Men's Basketball All-Americans
- 2006 high school boys basketball All-Americans
