= 1979 NCAA Men's Basketball All-Americans =

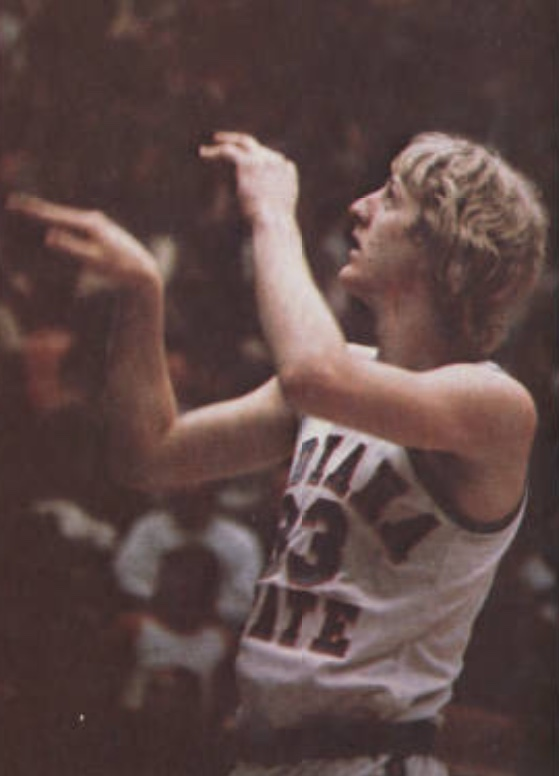
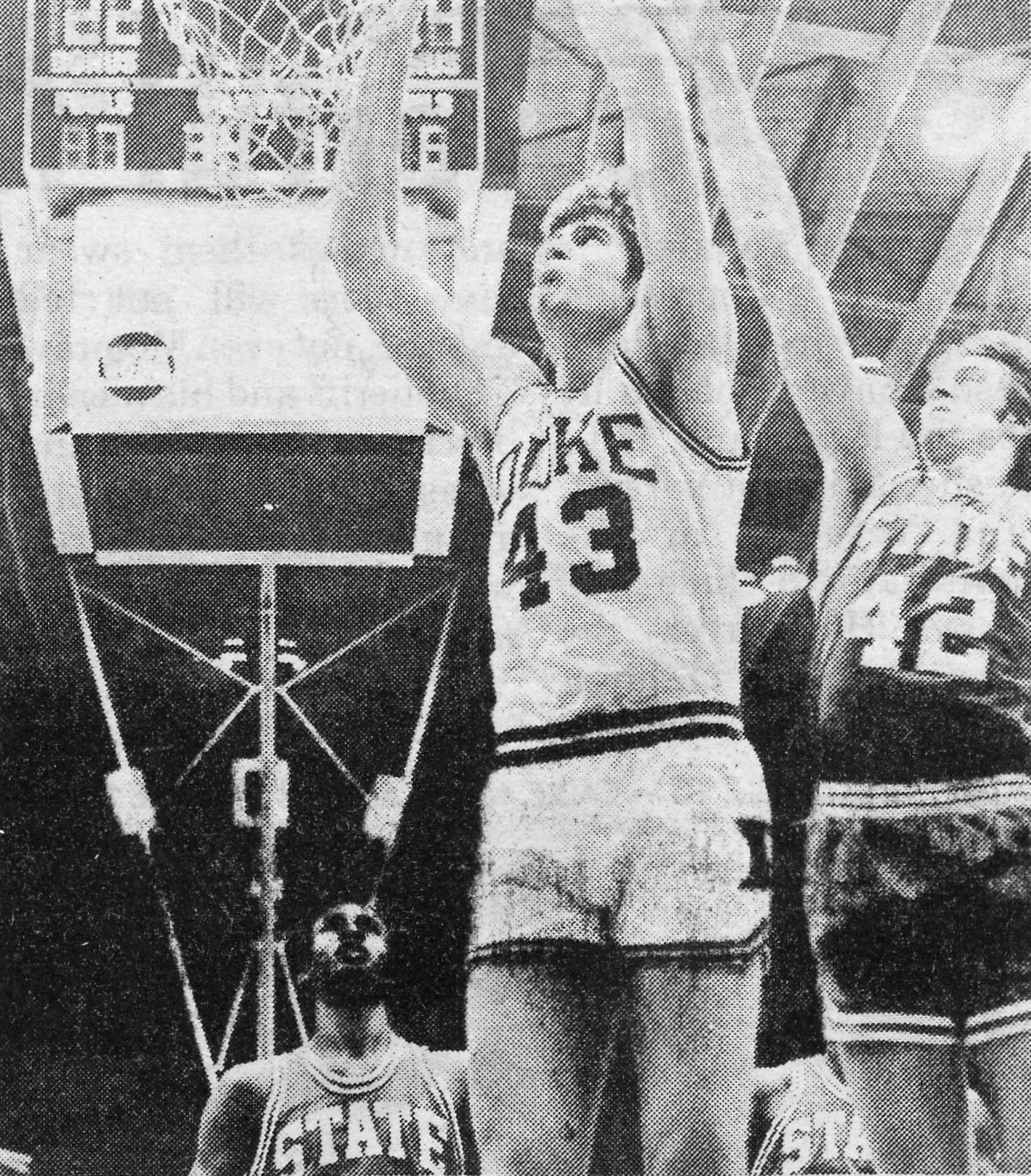
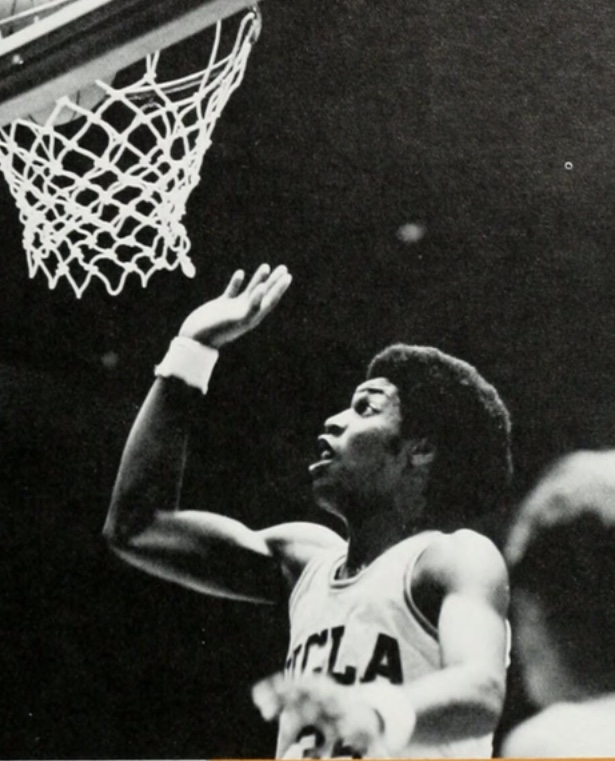
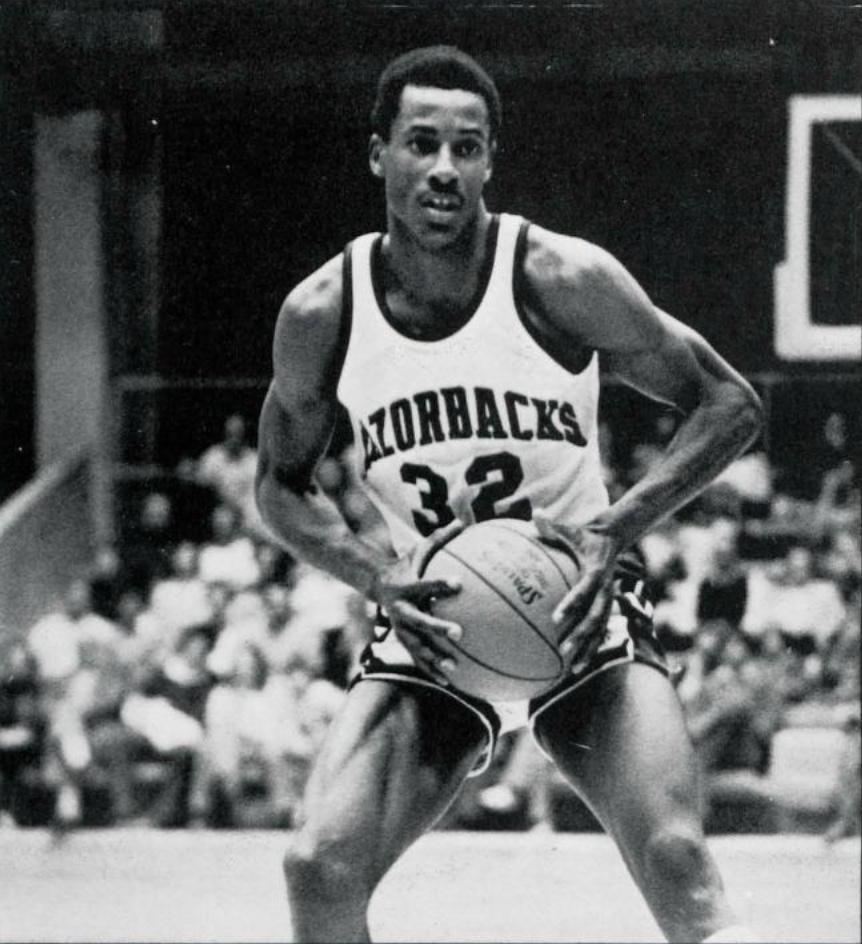
- Members of the 1979 Consensus All-America first team. Clockwise from upper left: Larry Bird, Mike Gminski, Sidney Moncrief and David Greenwood (not pictured: Magic Johnson).
- Awarded for: 1978–79 NCAA Division I men's basketball season

The consensus 1979 College Basketball All-American team, as determined by aggregating the results of four major All-American teams. To earn "consensus" status, a player must win honors from a majority of the following teams: the Associated Press, the USBWA, The United Press International and the National Association of Basketball Coaches.

== 1979 Consensus All-America team ==
Consensus First Team
Player	Position	Class	Team
Larry Bird	F	Senior	Indiana State
Mike Gminski	C	Junior	Duke
David Greenwood	F	Senior	UCLA
Magic Johnson	G	Sophomore	Michigan State
Sidney Moncrief	G	Senior	Arkansas

Consensus Second Team
Player	Position	Class	Team
Bill Cartwright	C	Senior	San Francisco
Calvin Natt	C	Senior	Northeast Louisiana
Mike O'Koren	F	Junior	North Carolina
Jim Paxson	G/F	Senior	Dayton
Jim Spanarkel	G	Senior	Duke
Kelly Tripucka	F	Sophomore	Notre Dame
Sly Williams	F	Junior	Rhode Island

== Individual All-America teams ==
All-America Team
All-America Team	First team		Second team		Third team		Fourth Team	
All-America Team	Player	School	Player	School	Player	School	Player	School
Associated Press	Larry Bird	Indiana State	Mike Gminski	Duke	Joe Barry Carroll	Purdue	No fourth team	
Associated Press	Bill Cartwright	San Francisco	Vinnie Johnson	Baylor	Roy Hamilton	UCLA	No fourth team	
Associated Press	David Greenwood	UCLA	Reggie King	Alabama	Greg Kelser	Michigan State	No fourth team	
Associated Press	Magic Johnson	Michigan State	Ronnie Lester	Iowa	Kelly Tripucka	Notre Dame	No fourth team	
Associated Press	Sidney Moncrief	Arkansas	Calvin Natt	Northeast Louisiana	Sly Williams	Rhode Island	No fourth team	
USBWA	Larry Bird	Indiana State	Calvin Natt	Northeast Louisiana	No third or fourth teams			
USBWA	Bill Cartwright	San Francisco	Mike O'Koren	North Carolina	No third or fourth teams			
USBWA	Mike Gminski	Duke	Jim Paxson	Dayton	No third or fourth teams			
USBWA	Magic Johnson	Michigan State	Kelly Tripucka	Notre Dame	No third or fourth teams			
USBWA	Sidney Moncrief	Arkansas	Sly Williams	Rhode Island	No third or fourth teams			
NABC	Larry Bird	Indiana State	Bill Cartwright	San Francisco	Joe Barry Carroll	Purdue	Danny Ainge	Brigham Young
NABC	Mike Gminski	Duke	Reggie King	Alabama	Darrell Griffith	Louisville	James Bailey	Rutgers
NABC	David Greenwood	UCLA	Mike O'Koren	North Carolina	Ronnie Lester	Iowa	Calvin Natt	Northeast Louisiana
NABC	Magic Johnson	Michigan State	Jim Spanarkel	Duke	Kyle Macy	Kentucky	Bernard Toone	Marquette
NABC	Sidney Moncrief	Arkansas	Kelly Tripucka	Notre Dame	Jim Paxson	Dayton	Mike Woodson	Indiana
UPI	Larry Bird	Indiana State	Bill Cartwright	San Francisco	James Bailey	Rutgers	No fourth team	
UPI	Mike Gminski	Duke	Darrell Griffith	Louisville	Gene Banks	Duke	No fourth team	
UPI	David Greenwood	UCLA	Sidney Moncrief	Arkansas	Ronnie Lester	Iowa	No fourth team	
UPI	Magic Johnson	Michigan State	Mike O'Koren	North Carolina	Kelvin Ransey	Ohio State	No fourth team	
UPI	Jim Spanarkel	Duke	Kelly Tripucka	Notre Dame	Sly Williams	Rhode Island	No fourth team	

AP Honorable Mention:

- Mark Aguirre, DePaul
- James Bailey, Rutgers
- Gene Banks, Duke
- Kim Belton, Stanford
- Rolando Blackman, Kansas State
- Roosevelt Bouie, Syracuse
- Brad Branson, SMU
- Michael Brooks, La Salle
- Matt Brown, Army
- Lawrence Butler, Idaho State
- Terence Carney, Pacific
- Sam Clancy, Pittsburgh
- Elbert Darden, Rice
- Larry Demic, Arizona
- Joe DeSantis, Fairfield
- Sammy Drummer, Georgia Tech
- Terry Duerod, Detroit
- Nikos Galis, Seton Hall
- Larry Gibson, Maryland
- Kim Goetz, San Diego State
- Michael Gray, Nevada
- Al Green, LSU
- Darrell Griffith, Louisville
- Brad Holland, UCLA
- Cheese Johnson, Wichita State
- Reggie Johnson, Tennessee
- Steve Johnson, Oregon State
- Albert King, Maryland
- Wayne Kreklow, Drake
- Jim Krivacs, Texas
- Jeff Lamp, Virginia
- Emmett Lewis, Colorado
- Kyle Macy, Kentucky
- Ollie Matson, Pepperdine
- John McCullough, Oklahoma
- Keith McDonald, Utah State
- Mike Niles, Cal State Fullerton
- Mike O'Koren, North Carolina
- Jim Paxson, Dayton
- Ron Perry, Holy Cross
- Tony Price, Penn
- Rick Raivio, Portland
- Kelvin Ransey, Ohio State
- Ricky Reed, Temple
- Cliff Robinson, USC
- Jeff Ruland, Iona
- DeWayne Scales, LSU
- Craig Shelton, Georgetown
- Jim Spanarkel, Duke
- John Stroud, Ole Miss
- Londale Theus, Santa Clara
- Bernard Toone, Marquette
- Darnell Valentine, Kansas
- Ronnie Valentine, Old Dominion
- Ren Watson, VCU
- Hawkeye Whitney, NC State
- Herb Williams, Ohio State
- Rudy Woods, Texas A&M

== Academic All-Americans ==
On March 21, 1979, CoSIDA announced the 1979 Academic All-America team. The following is the 1978–79 Academic All-America Men's Basketball Team as selected by CoSIDA:

Academic All-America Team
Player	School	Class
Mike Gminski	Duke	Junior
Greg Kelser	Michigan State	Senior
Jim Krivacs	Texas	Senior
Kyle Macy	Kentucky	Senior
Jim Paxson	Dayton	Senior
Ron Perry	Holy Cross	Junior
Jim Spanarkel	Duke	Senior
Kelly Tripucka	Notre Dame	Sophomore
Darnell Valentine	Kansas	Sophomore
Kiki Vandeweghe	UCLA	Junior

== See also ==
- 1978–79 NCAA Division I men's basketball season
