= Sly Williams =

American basketball player (born 1958)

Personal information
- Born: January 26, 1958 (age 68) New Haven, Connecticut, U.S.
- Listed height: 6 ft 7 in (2.01 m)
- Listed weight: 210 lb (95 kg)

Career information
- High school: Lee (New Haven, Connecticut)
- College: Rhode Island (1976–1979)
- NBA draft: 1979: 1st round, 21st overall pick
- Drafted by: New York Knicks
- Playing career: 1979–1985
- Position: Small forward / shooting guard
- Number: 33, 35

Career history
- 1979–1983: New York Knicks
- 1983–1985: Atlanta Hawks
- 1985: Boston Celtics

Career highlights
- Consensus second-team All-American (1979)

Career NBA statistics
- Points: 3,327 (10.9 ppg)
- Rebounds: 1,287 (4.2 rpg)
- Assists: 603 (2.0 apg)
- Stats at NBA.com
- Stats at Basketball Reference

Sylvester Williams (born January 26, 1958) is an American former professional basketball player. Born in New Haven, Connecticut. In 1979 he was drafted 21st overall by the New York Knicks and he played parts of seven seasons in the National Basketball Association (NBA) with the New York Knicks, Atlanta Hawks and Boston Celtics, appearing in 305 regular season games and seven in the playoffs. In 1985 he signed for the Celtics, but was released on December 2 after a number of personal issues. The Celtics went on to win the 1986 NBA Finals in his absence. As a member of the Knicks, Williams was the last player to wear No. 33 before Patrick Ewing.

Williams was highly recruited as an All American out of Lee High School in New Haven, Connecticut. He averaged 31 points and 22 rebounds per game his senior year, leading his team to the Connecticut state title. He was highly recruited out of High School by schools such as the University of Rhode Island (URI), Providence College, University of Texas, University of Georgia, University of Connecticut and others. He verbally committed to Providence College and is credited with intensifying the rivalry between the URI and Providence College after signing a letter of intent to attend URI the first day of his fall semester, when he was supposed to arrive at Providence. He spent his whole college career attending URI.

In August 2002 he pleaded guilty to kidnapping charges after allegedly holding a woman captive for about 24 hours and threatening her with a knife in September 2001, and raping a second woman in January 2002. The cases were consolidated and Williams was charged with first-degree rape, sodomy and first-degree kidnapping. He was sentenced to up to five years in prison. Williams was working for a pipe and plastics company at the time of his arrest.

== Career statistics ==
Legend
GP	Games played	GS	Games started	MPG	Minutes per game
FG%	Field goal percentage	3P%	3-point field goal percentage	FT%	Free throw percentage
RPG	Rebounds per game	APG	Assists per game	SPG	Steals per game
BPG	Blocks per game	PPG	Points per game	**Bold**	Career high

=== NBA ===
==== Regular season ====
Year	Team	GP	GS	MPG	FG%	3P%	FT%	RPG	APG	SPG	BPG	PPG
1979–80	New York	57		9.8	.390	.000	.644	2.1	.6	.3	.1	4.7
1980–81	New York	67		**29.5**	.493	.250	.690	**6.2**	2.7	**1.7**	**.3**	13.2
1981–82	New York	60	**27**	25.4	**.556**	.222	.757	3.8	2.4	1.3	**.3**	**13.9**
1982–83	New York	**68**	6	20.4	.485	.105	.680	4.3	2.0	1.1	.0	11.9
1983–84	Atlanta	13	1	19.8	.298	.111	**.783**	3.8	1.2	1.1	.1	8.1
1984–85	Atlanta	34	20	25.5	.439	**.267**	.642	4.9	**2.8**	.8	.2	12.3
1985–86	Boston	6	0	9.0	.238	.000	.583	2.5	.3	.2	.2	2.8
Career		305	54	21.7	.478	.162	.692	4.2	2.0	1.1	.2	10.9

==== Playoffs ====
Year	Team	GP	MPG	FG%	3P%	FT%	RPG	APG	SPG	BPG	PPG
1981	New York	2	**28.0**	**.722**	–	–	**4.5**	**2.5**	**1.5**	.0	**13.0**
1983	New York	**5**	16.4	.390	**1.000**	**1.000**	4.2	1.2	.6	**.2**	7.2
Career		7	19.7	.492	**1.000**	**1.000**	4.3	1.6	.9	.1	8.9
