= Jim Jordan (basketball) =

American basketball player

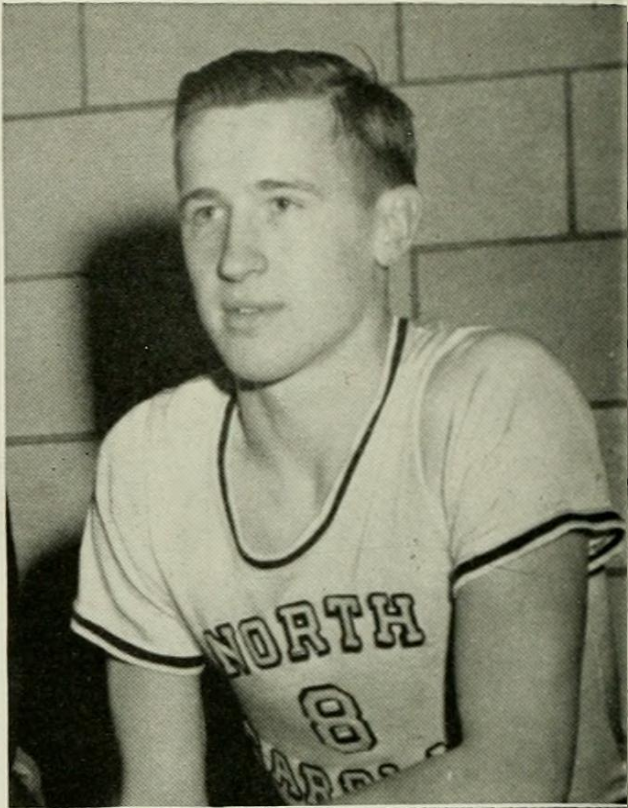
- Jordan as a member of the 1944–45 North Carolina team

Personal information
- Born: May 26, 1925 Chester, West Virginia, U.S.
- Died: October 14, 1999 (aged 74)
- Listed height: 6 ft 3 in (1.91 m)
- Listed weight: 185 lb (84 kg)

Career information
- College: Mount St. Mary's (1943–1944); North Carolina (1944–1946); Kentucky (1946–1948)
- Position: Guard

Career highlights
- First-team All-American – Helms (1946); Second-team All-American – Helms (1945)

James Jordan (May 26, 1925 – October 14, 1999) was an American basketball player.

He played collegiately for the University of North Carolina from 1944 to 1946. Although he originally attended Mount St. Mary's University, where he was the team's leading scorer, the U.S. Navy transferred him to the ROTC in Chapel Hill. Soon after arriving at UNC, Jordan became one of the best players on the team. He helped the University of North Carolina post a 22–6 record in 1945 and a 30–5 record for the national semi-finalist 1946 team.

He was the only unanimous selection to the 1945 All-Southern Conference team. He was named second-team All-America in 1945 and first-team All-America in 1946. Because of his national accolades, Jordan's number 8 was honored by the University of North Carolina and currently hangs in the rafters of the Dean Smith Center.

From 1946 to 1948 he attended the University of Kentucky and played with the Wildcats' NCAA 1948 championship team. He received his master's degree in education from Kentucky that same year.

Jordan died on October 14, 1999.
