= Mike O'Koren =

American basketball player (born 1958)

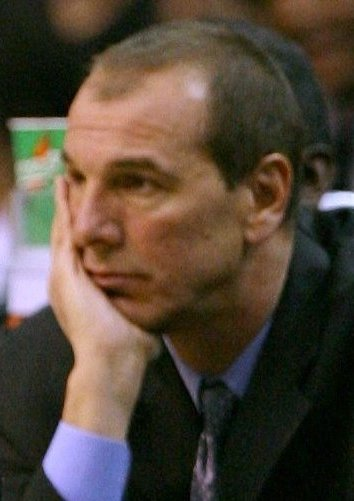
- O'Koren in 2006

Personal information
- Born: February 7, 1958 (age 68) Jersey City, New Jersey, U.S.
- Listed height: 6 ft 7 in (2.01 m)
- Listed weight: 207 lb (94 kg)

Career information
- High school: Hudson Catholic (Jersey City, New Jersey)
- College: North Carolina (1976–1980)
- NBA draft: 1980: 1st round, 6th overall pick
- Drafted by: New Jersey Nets
- Playing career: 1980–1988
- Position: Small forward
- Number: 31, 25
- Coaching career: 1999–2016

Career history

Playing
- 1980–1986: New Jersey Nets
- 1986–1987: Washington Bullets
- 1987–1988: New Jersey Nets

Coaching
- 1999–2003: New Jersey Nets (assistant)
- 2003–2009: Washington Wizards (assistant)
- 2009–2010: Philadelphia 76ers (assistant)
- 2014–2016: Rutgers (assistant)

Career highlights
- 2× Consensus second-team All-American (1979, 1980); Third-team All-American – NABC (1978); 2× First-team All-ACC (1978, 1980); Second-team All-ACC (1979)

Career NBA statistics
- Points: 3,355 (8.2 ppg)
- Rebounds: 1,391 (3.4 rpg)
- Assists: 856 (2.1 apg)
- Stats at NBA.com
- Stats at Basketball Reference
Medals
Representing United States
Men's basketball
Pan American Games
Gold medal – first place	1979 San Juan	Team competition

Michael F. O'Koren (born February 7, 1958) is an American former basketball player, coach and broadcaster originally from Jersey City, New Jersey. O'Koren was last an assistant coach at Rutgers University, serving under head coach Eddie Jordan.

A graduate of The University of North Carolina at Chapel Hill, where he played under Dean Smith, O'Koren was a first round draft pick of the New Jersey Nets in 1980 and played for the Nets and Washington Bullets in a career that ended in 1988.

After his retirement, O'Koren joined the Nets' broadcast team and remained there until 1999, when he joined Don Casey's staff as an assistant coach. He returned to Washington in 2003 when Eddie Jordan, with whom he had served in New Jersey, hired him to be the associate head coach of the Wizards. O'Koren also served as an assistant under Jordan with the Philadelphia 76ers in the 2009–10 season.

After he was let go by the 76ers, O'Koren returned to broadcasting and called high school games for FiOS1 New Jersey before Jordan hired him to serve on his staff at Rutgers in 2014.

== High school career ==
O'Koren attended Hudson Catholic Regional High School in Jersey City.

== College career ==
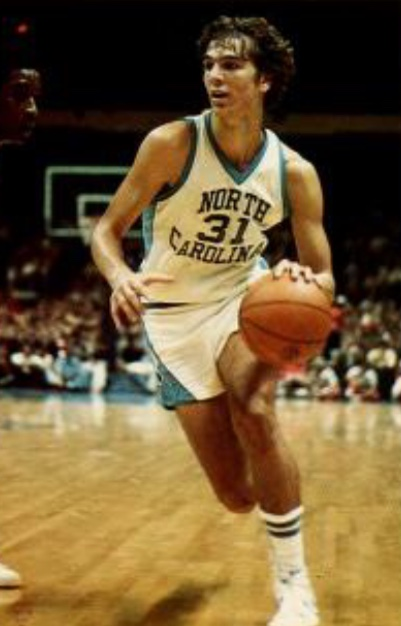
O'Koren playing for UNC in 1977

On a talent-laden 1977 UNC team as a freshman he averaged 13.9 points per game, scored 21 points against Duke in the ACC championship game and had 31 in the NCAA semi-finals against UNLV. As a sophomore his scoring rose to 17.8. He scored in double figures every game and was second nationally with a 64.3 field goal percentage.

In 1979, Carolina was picked to finish third or lower in all the 1979 ACC pre-season polls. But, Dudley Bradley, the nation's best defensive player, and Al Wood, one of the top shooters in the college game, each improved their play on the opposite ends of the court. With O'Koren already proven as a fine all-around player, the Tar Heels posted a 23–6 record, tied for first place in the league's regular-season race, swept the ACC Tournament and finished third nationally in the final coaches' poll.

O'Koren was at his best in the biggest games. He grabbed a career-high 20 rebounds, scored 17 points, handed out seven assists and had four steals in a 74-68 homecourt win over Duke. He also held Gene Banks scoreless in the second half of that game. He finished with 22 points and five assists in a double overtime win over Virginia. In the 1980 ACC Tournament, O'Koren connected on all eight of his field goal attempts along with four steals in the first half versus Wake Forest. In the ACC Tournament finals against Duke he had 18 points and 11 rebounds. He scored Carolina's final 10 points that day in a 71–63 victory.

As of 2013, O'Koren was the only player in North Carolina history to have scored at least 1,500 points (1,765), 800 rebounds (815) and 300 assists (348). He also had 183 steals and a career field goal percentage of 57.2.

== Professional playing career ==
In his NBA career, O'Koren played in 407 games and scored a total of 3,355 points. O'Koren was the best player in the league for games played November 12th, 1980, when he posted 28 points on 12-16 from the floor and 4-4 from the free throw line, 16 rebounds, 7 assists and three steals versus the Denver Nuggets. His best year as a professional came during the 1981–82 season as a member of the Nets, appearing in 80 games and averaging 11.4 ppg. On February 10th, 1982, O'Koren stole the ball on three consecutive plays from the Detroit Pistons in a minute of game clock.

In 1985, an analysis performed by USA Today crowned O'Koren the NBA's "Mr. Average", based on the league's players' ages, heights, weights and statistics. When informed he was the NBA's average man, O'Koren said: "I don't consider myself above average or below anyone. I guess that's what makes me average."

== Coaching career ==
O'Koren was an assistant coach under Eddie Jordan for over a decade: first from 1999 to 2003 with the New Jersey Nets and 2003 to 2009 with the Washington Wizards. In the 2009–10 season, O'Koren was an associate head coach with the Philadelphia 76ers again under Jordan.

== Career statistics ==
Legend
GP	Games played	GS	Games started	MPG	Minutes per game
FG%	Field goal percentage	3P%	3-point field goal percentage	FT%	Free throw percentage
RPG	Rebounds per game	APG	Assists per game	SPG	Steals per game
BPG	Blocks per game	PPG	Points per game	**Bold**	Career high

=== NBA ===
==== Regular season ====
Year	Team	GP	GS	MPG	FG%	3P%	FT%	RPG	APG	SPG	BPG	PPG
1980–81	New Jersey	79		**31.3**	.486	.278	.637	**6.1**	**3.2**	**1.1**	.3	11.0
1981–82	New Jersey	**80**	**32**	25.2	.492	.348	**.714**	3.8	2.4	1.0	.2	**11.4**
1982–83	New Jersey	46	13	17.5	.525	.222	.708	2.5	1.8	.9	.2	6.7
1983–84	New Jersey	73	25	16.3	.483	.179	.609	2.4	1.3	.5	.2	5.9
1984–85	New Jersey	43	29	26.0	.494	**.381**	.627	3.9	2.4	.7	.4	10.2
1985–86	New Jersey	67	11	15.4	.476	.259	.590	2.0	1.8	.4	.1	5.2
1986–87	Washington	15	0	8.2	.381	.000	.000	.9	.9	.1	.0	2.1
1987–88	New Jersey	4	0	13.0	**.563**	.000	.000	1.0	.5	.8	**.5**	4.5
Career		407	111	21.6	.490	.271	.651	3.4	2.1	.8	.2	8.2

==== Playoffs ====
Year	Team	GP	GS	MPG	FG%	3P%	FT%	RPG	APG	SPG	BPG	PPG
1982	New Jersey	2		**22.0**	.273	.000	.500	**4.0**	1.5	.5	.0	3.5
1983	New Jersey	2		9.0	.250	–	–	3.0	1.5	.0	.0	2.0
1984	New Jersey	**11**		19.6	.424	.000	**.833**	3.2	**1.9**	.3	.4	**5.0**
1985	New Jersey	3	0	11.3	**.429**	–	.000	3.3	1.3	.0	.0	2.0
1986	New Jersey	2	0	10.5	.167	.000	–	1.0	1.0	**1.0**	**.5**	1.0
Career		20	0	16.7	.374	.000	.600	3.1	1.7	.3	.3	3.7
