= 1956–57 Iowa State Cyclones men's basketball team =

American college basketball season

1956–57 Iowa State Cyclones men's basketball
- Conference: Big Seven Conference
- Record: 16–7 (6–6 Big Seven)
- Head coach: Bill Strannigan (3rd season)
- Assistant coach: Bob Lamson
- Home arena: Iowa State Armory

1956–57 Big Seven Conference men's basketball standings
	Conf.				Overall
Team	W		L	PCT	W		L	PCT
No. 2 Kansas	11	–	1	.917	24	–	3	.889
Kansas State	8	–	4	.667	15	–	8	.652
Iowa State	6	–	6	.500	16	–	7	.696
Colorado	5	–	7	.417	14	–	9	.609
Nebraska	5	–	7	.417	11	–	12	.478
Missouri	4	–	8	.333	10	–	13	.435
Oklahoma	3	–	9	.250	8	–	15	.348
Rankings from AP Poll

The 1956–57 Iowa State Cyclones men's basketball team represented Iowa State University during the 1956–57 NCAA men's basketball season. The Cyclones were coached by Bill Strannigan, who was in his third season with the Cyclones. They played their home games at the Iowa State Armory in Ames, Iowa.

They finished the season 16–7, 6–6 in Big Seven play to finish in third place. Gary Thompson won Big Seven Player of the Year, edging out Wilt Chamberlain of Kansas. Iowa State also picked up their first ever win over a top ranked team, defeating Kansas, 39–37.

== Roster ==
1956–57 Iowa State Cyclones men's basketball team
Players
Coaches

Pos.	#	Name	Height	Weight	Year	Hometown
G		Ronald Baukol	5 ft 10 in (1.78 m)	—	So
F		Bud Bergman	6 ft 4 in (1.93 m)	—	So
F		Fred Boshela	6 ft 4 in (1.93 m)	—		Rockford, Illinois
F		John Crawford	6 ft 5 in (1.96 m)	—	Jr
F		Gary Davis	6 ft 6 in (1.98 m)	—	So
F		Dave Day	6 ft 2 in (1.88 m)	—
G		Dick Farwell	6 ft 1 in (1.85 m)	—	Jr
G		Lyle Frahm	6 ft 2 in (1.88 m)	—	Jr
F		Gene Gronau	6 ft 4 in (1.93 m)	—
C		John Krocheski	6 ft 7 in (2.01 m)	—	So
G		Al Lowery	5 ft 10 in (1.78 m)	—	Jr
C		Don Medsker	6 ft 8 in (2.03 m)	—	Jr
G		Larry Swanson	6 ft 0 in (1.83 m)	—
G	20	Gary Thompson (C)	5 ft 10 in (1.78 m)	—	Sr	Roland, Iowa
F		Chuck Vogt (C)	6 ft 6 in (1.98 m)	—	Sr

Head coach

- Bill Strannigan

Assistant coach(es)

Bob Lamson

Legend

- (C) Team captain
- (S) Suspended
- (I) Ineligible
- (W) Walk-on
- Injured
- Current redshirt

== Schedule and results ==
Date time, TV	Rank^{#}	Opponent^{#}	Result	Record	Site city, state
Regular season
December 1, 1956*; 8:00 pm		at Michigan State	W 60–53	1–0	Jenison Fieldhouse; East Lansing, Michigan
December 3, 1956*; 7:35 pm		Houston	W 92–73	2–0	Iowa State Armory; Ames, Iowa
December 6, 1956*; 7:35 pm		BYU	W 57–48	3–0	Iowa State Armory; Ames, Iowa
December 14, 1956*; 8:00 pm	No. 17	at Texas Tech	W 63–62	4–0	Lubbock Municipal Coliseum; Lubbock, Texas
December 15, 1956*; 7:30 pm	No. 17	at Tulsa	W 72–52	5–0	Expo Square Pavilion; Tulsa, Oklahoma
December 22, 1956*; 8:00 pm	No. 14	Wyoming	W 85–57	6–0	Iowa State Armory; Ames, Iowa
December 26, 1956*; 9:30 pm	No. 14	vs. No. 1 Kansas; Big Seven Holiday Tournament Quarterfinals	L 57–58	6–1	Municipal Auditorium; Kansas City, Missouri
December 28, 1956*; 2:00 pm	No. 14	vs. Kansas State; Big Seven Holiday Tournament Consolation Semifinals	W 74–64	7–1	Municipal Auditorium; Kansas City, Missouri
December 29, 1956*; 4:00 pm	No. 14	vs. Nebraska; Big Seven Holiday Tournament Fifth Place	W 89–69	8–1	Municipal Auditorium; Kansas City, Missouri
January 7, 1957; 8:00 pm	No. 7	at Missouri	L 59–77	8–2 (0–1)	Brewer Fieldhouse; Columbia, Missouri
January 11, 1957; 8:15 pm	No. 7	at Drake; Iowa Big Four	W 97–71	9–2	Drake Fieldhouse; Des Moines, Iowa
January 14, 1957; 7:35 pm, WOI	No. 7	No. 1 Kansas	W 39–37	10–2 (1–1)	Iowa State Armory; Ames, Iowa
January 19, 1957; 7:35 pm	No. 9	Oklahoma	W 74–54	11–2 (2–1)	Iowa State Armory; Ames, Iowa
January 24, 1957; 7:35 pm, WOI	No. 3	Missouri	L 66–69 ^{OT}	11–3 (2–2)	Iowa State Armory; Ames, Iowa
January 28, 1957; 7:35 pm	No. 3	at Oklahoma	W 67–56	12–3 (3–2)	OU Fieldhouse; Norman, Oklahoma
February 2, 1957; 7:35 pm, WOI/WMT/KVTV/WDAF	No. 8	at No. 2 Kansas	L 64–75	12–4 (3–3)	Allen Fieldhouse; Lawrence, Kansas
February 4, 1957; 7:35 pm	No. 8	Colorado	W 72–71	13–4 (4–3)	Iowa State Armory; Ames, Iowa
February 7, 1957*; 7:35 pm	No. 9	Drake; Iowa Big Four	W 92–71	14–4	Iowa State Armory; Ames, Iowa
February 11, 1957; 9:05 pm	No. 9	at Colorado	L 52–59	14–5 (4–4)	Balch Fieldhouse; Boulder, Colorado
February 16, 1957; 7:35 pm	No. 9	Nebraska	W 59–47	15–5 (5–4)	Iowa State Armory; Ames, Iowa
February 23, 1957; 7:35 pm	No. 9	at No. 17 Kansas State	L 77–86 ^{OT}	15–6 (5–5)	Ahearn Fieldhouse; Manhattan, Kansas
March 2, 1957; 7:35 pm, WOI	No. 16	No. 12 Kansas State	W 69–67 ^{OT}	16–6 (6–5)	Iowa State Armory; Ames, Iowa
March 9, 1957; 8:00 pm	No. 17	Nebraska	L 58–67	16–7 (6–6)	Nebraska Coliseum; Lincoln, Nebraska
*Non-conference game. ^{#}Rankings from AP poll. (#) Tournament seedings in parentheses. All times are in Central Time.
