= Bobby Laughlin =

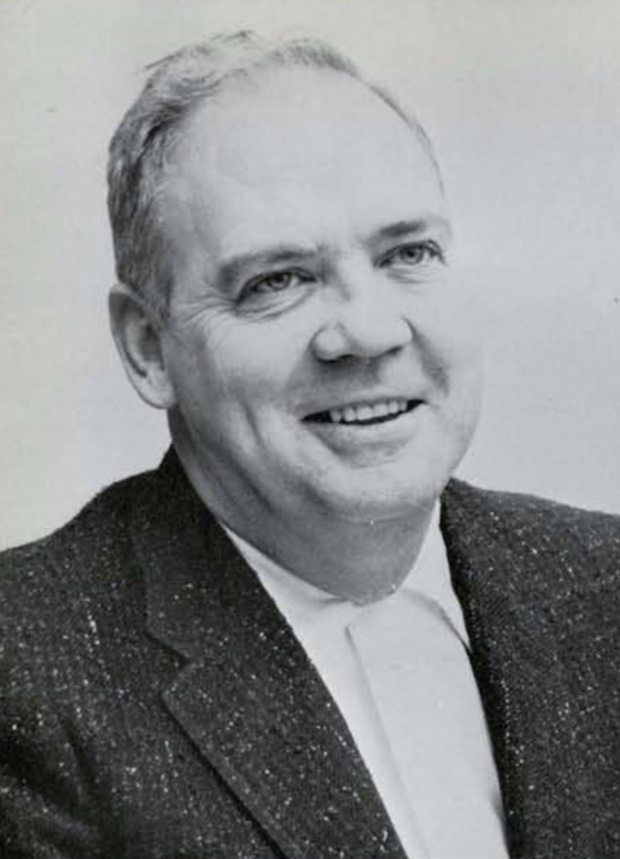
- Laughlin in 1964

Biographical details
- Died: August 8, 1985 (aged 74)

Playing career
- 1934–1937: Morehead State

Coaching career (HC unless noted)
- 1953–1965: Morehead State

Administrative career (AD unless noted)
- 1953–1973: Morehead State

Head coaching record
- Overall: 166–120 (.580)
- Tournaments: NCAA: 3–4 (.429)

Accomplishments and honors

Championships
- 4× OVC (1956, 1957, 1961, 1963)

Robert G. Laughlin (died August 8, 1985) was a college basketball coach and athletics administrator. He was the head coach of Morehead State from 1953 to 1965. He coached Morehead State to a 166–120 record, winning four Ohio Valley Conference championships and three NCAA tournament appearances. He also played his college basketball at Morehead State. He was inducted into the Morehead State athletics Hall of Fame in 1985. The Laughlin Health Building at Morehead State University is named in his honor.

Laughlin died on August 8, 1985, at age 74.

== Head coaching record ==
Record table
Season	Team	Overall	Conference	Standing	Postseason
Morehead State Eagles (Ohio Valley Conference) (1953–1965)
1953–54	Morehead State	16–8	6–4	T-2nd	
1954–55	Morehead State	14–10	5–5	4th	
1955–56	Morehead State	19–10	7–3	T-1st	NCAA Sweet Sixteen
1956–57	Morehead State	19–8	9–1	T-1st	NCAA First Round
1957–58	Morehead State	13–10	6–4	2nd	
1958–59	Morehead State	11–12	5–7	T-4th	
1959–60	Morehead State	5–14	3–7	5th	
1960–61	Morehead State	19–12	9–3	T-1st	NCAA Sweet Sixteen
1961–62	Morehead State	14–8	7–5	T-2nd	
1962–63	Morehead State	13–7	8–4	T-1st	
1963–64	Morehead State	10–11	6–8	6th	
1964–65	Morehead State	13–10	6–8	5th	
Morehead State:		166–120 (.580)	77–59 (.566)		
Total:		166–120 (.580)			
National champion Postseason invitational champion Conference regular season champion Conference regular season and conference tournament champion Division regular season champion Division regular season and conference tournament champion Conference tournament champion
