= Mike Preaseau =

American college basketball player (1936–2022)

Personal information
- Born: January 3, 1936 Powers, Michigan, U.S.
- Died: April 25, 2022 (aged 86)
- Listed height: 6 ft 5 in (1.96 m)
- Listed weight: 185 lb (84 kg)

Career information
- High school: Shasta (Redding, California)
- College: Menlo (1954–1955); San Francisco (1955–1958)
- NBA draft: 1958: undrafted
- Position: Forward

Career highlights
- NCAA champion (1956)

Michael A. Preaseau Sr. (January 3, 1936 – April 25, 2022) was an American college basketball player who was a member of the University of San Francisco's national championship team in 1955–56. He never played professionally, but he did establish himself as a solid college player at both the junior college and National Collegiate Athletic Association (NCAA) levels.

== Basketball career ==
Preseau graduated from Shasta High School in Redding, California in 1954. He enrolled at Menlo College, which at the time was still a junior college, and played basketball for them for one year. Preaseau led the team in scoring as a freshman and guided them to a conference championship.

The next year, Preaseau enrolled at the University of San Francisco (USF). It was during his sophomore season that the Dons went 29–0 and won the NCAA Tournament, led by future Hall of Famers Bill Russell and K. C. Jones. Preaseau was a starting forward on the squad who averaged 4.1 points and 3.1 rebounds per game, and in the national championship game against Iowa he scored seven points.

Preaseau played two more seasons at USF before graduating in 1959. In his junior season in 1956–57, USF surprised the college basketball world by winning a third straight conference championship and advanced to the Final Four before losing to a Wilt Chamberlain-led Kansas Jayhawks squad. In the Final Four match, Preaseau collected two rebounds to go along with 12 points.

After graduating in 1959, Preaseau never played professionally. He went into the private contracting industry.
