= Bill Strannigan =

American basketball coach (1918–1997)

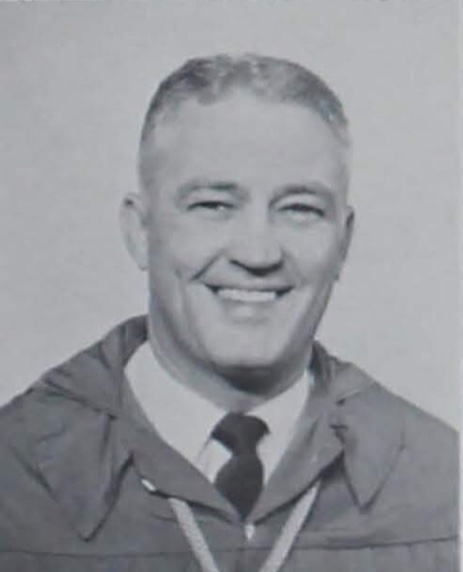
- Strannigan from the 1958 Bomb

Biographical details
- Born: December 1, 1918; Dalry, North Ayrshire, Scotland
- Died: September 7, 1997 (aged 78); Larimer County, Colorado, U.S.

Playing career

Football
- 1940–1942: Wyoming

Basketball
- 1939–1942: Wyoming

Baseball
- 1940–1942: Wyoming

Coaching career (HC unless noted)
- 1950–1954: Colorado State
- 1954–1959: Iowa State
- 1959–1973: Wyoming

Head coaching record
- Overall: 308–289
- Tournaments: NCAA: 0-4; NIT: 0-2

Accomplishments and honors

Championships
- Basketball; MSC (1954); 2× WAC (1967, 1969)

Awards
- Basketball; WAC Coach of the Year (1967)

William Matthew Strannigan (December 1, 1918 – September 7, 1997) was an American college men's basketball coach . He was the head coach of Colorado State from 1950 to 1954, Iowa State from 1954 to 1959, and Wyoming from 1959 to 1973. He coached his teams to a 308-289 record, winning one Mountain States Conference championship, two Western Athletic Conference championships, two NCAA tournament appearances, and two NIT appearances. He played his college basketball at Wyoming. He was inducted into the Wyoming athletics Hall of Fame in 1994 and the Iowa State athletics Hall of Fame in 2005.

== Head coaching record ==
Record table
Season	Team	Overall	Conference	Standing	Postseason
Colorado State Rams (Mountain States Conference) (1950–1954)
1950–51	Colorado State	13–20	6–14	T–5th	
1951–52	Colorado State	13–15	3–11	7th	
1952–53	Colorado State	12–14	5–9	T–5th	
1953–54	Colorado State	22–7	12–2	1st	NCAA Sweet 16
Colorado State:		60–56 (.517)	26–36 (.419)		
Iowa State Cyclones (Big Eight Conference) (1954–1959)
1954–55	Iowa State	11–10	4–8	6th	
1955–56	Iowa State	18–5	8–4	T–2nd	
1956–57	Iowa State	16–7	6–6	3rd	
1957–58	Iowa State	15–8	8–4	T–2nd	
1958–59	Iowa State	9–16	4–10	7th	
Iowa State:		69–46 (.600)	30–32 (.484)		
Wyoming Cowboys (Mountain States Conference) (1959–1962)
1959–60	Wyoming	5–19	2–12	8th	
1960–61	Wyoming	7–18	3–11	T–7th	
1961–62	Wyoming	9–17	3–11	T–7th	
Wyoming Cowboys (Western Athletic Conference) (1962–1973)
1962–63	Wyoming	11–15	3–7	T–5th	
1963–64	Wyoming	12–14	3–7	6th	
1964–65	Wyoming	16–10	5–5	T–3rd	
1965–66	Wyoming	17–9	5–5	T–3rd	
1966–67	Wyoming	15–14	8–2	T–1st	NCAA University Division Sweet 16
1967–68	Wyoming	18–9	5–5	T–2nd	NIT First Round
1968–69	Wyoming	19–9	6–4	T–1st	NIT First Round
1969–70	Wyoming	19–7	9–5	T–2nd	
1970–71	Wyoming	10–15	6–8	6th	
1971–72	Wyoming	12–14	3–11	8th	
1972–73	Wyoming	9–17	4–10	T–7th	
Wyoming:		179–187 (.489)	65–103 (.387)		
Total:		308–289 (.516)			
National champion Postseason invitational champion Conference regular season champion Conference regular season and conference tournament champion Division regular season champion Division regular season and conference tournament champion Conference tournament champion
