= 1956–57 NCAA University Division men's basketball rankings =

- Season: 1956–57
- NCAA Tournament: 1957
- Preseason No. 1: Kansas
- NCAA Tournament Champions: North Carolina
NCAA University Division men's basketball rankings


The 1956–57 NCAA men's basketball rankings was made up of two human polls, the AP Poll and the Coaches Poll.

== Legend ==
	Increase in ranking
	Decrease in ranking
	New to rankings from previous week
Italics	Number of first place votes
(#–#)	Win–loss record
т	Tied with team above or below also with this symbol

== AP Poll ==
	Week 1 Dec. 10	Week 2 Dec. 17	Week 3 Dec. 26	Week 4 Jan. 2	Week 5 Jan. 7	Week 6 Jan. 14	Week 7 Jan. 21	Week 8 Jan. 28	Week 9 Feb. 4	Week 10 Feb. 11	Week 11 Feb. 18	Week 12 Feb. 25	Week 13 Mar. 4	Final Mar. 11	
1.	Kansas (2–0)	Kansas (4–0)	Kansas (6–0)	Kansas (9–0)	Kansas (10–0)	Kansas (12–0)	North Carolina (15–0)	North Carolina (16–0)	North Carolina (16–0)	North Carolina (18–0)	North Carolina (20–0)	North Carolina (22–0)	North Carolina (24–0)	North Carolina (27–0)	1.
2.	San Francisco (4–0)	San Francisco (5–0)	North Carolina (8–0)	North Carolina (11–0)	North Carolina (11–0)	North Carolina (14–0)	Kansas (12–1)	Kansas (12–1)	Kansas (13–1)	Kansas (14–1)	Kansas (16–1)	Kansas (18–2)	Kansas (19–2)	Kansas (21–2)	2.
3.	Kentucky (3–0)	North Carolina (4–0)	Kentucky (6–2)	Kentucky (8–2)	Kentucky (9–2)	SMU (13–1)	Iowa State (11–2)	Louisville (12–2)	Kentucky (16–3)	Kentucky (17–3)	Kentucky (18–4)	Kentucky (20–4)	Kentucky (22–4)	Kentucky (22–4)	3.
4.	Louisville (3–1)	SMU (5–0)	West Virginia (8–0)	SMU (10–1)	SMU (11–1)	Kentucky (11–2)	Louisville (11–2)	Kentucky (13–3)	SMU (15–2)	Seattle (18–2)	Seattle (19–2)	SMU (19–3)	SMU (21–3)	SMU (21–3)	4.
5.	SMU (2–0)	Illinois (3–0)	Saint Louis (6–1)	Illinois (6–1)	Louisville (8–2)	Louisville (9–2)	Kentucky (12–3)	UCLA (13–1)	UCLA (15–1)	Bradley (15–2)	Bradley (17–3)	Seattle (20–2)	Seattle (22–2)	Seattle (22–2)	5.
6.	North Carolina (2–0)	Louisville (4–1)	Illinois (5–1)	Louisville (7–2)	Vanderbilt (8–1)	UCLA (13–1)	SMU (14–2)	SMU (14–2)	Louisville (14–3)	SMU (16–3)	SMU (17–3)	UCLA (20–2)	Louisville (20–5)	Louisville (21–5)	6.
7.	Illinois (2–0)	Kentucky (4–1)	SMU (7–1)	Iowa State (8–1)	Iowa State (8–1)	Seattle (13–2)	UCLA (13–1)	Illinois (10–2)	Seattle (17–2)	UCLA (16–2)	Louisville (17–4)	Bradley (18–4)	UCLA (21–4)	West Virginia (25–4)	7.
8.	NC State (3–0)	West Virginia (6–0)	Louisville (5–2)	UCLA (8–1)	UCLA (11–1)	Illinois (8–2)	Seattle (14–2)	Iowa State (11–3)	Bradley (13–2)	Louisville (15–4)	UCLA (18–2)	Louisville (18–5)	Michigan State (14–7)	Vanderbilt (17–5)	8.
9.	Alabama (3–0)	Saint Louis (4–1)	Duke (5–1)	Vanderbilt (6–1)	Seattle (11–2)	Iowa State (9–2)	Illinois (9–2)	Seattle (17–2)	Iowa State (12–4)	Iowa State (14–4)	Iowa State (15–5)	Vanderbilt (16–5)	Vanderbilt (17–5)	Oklahoma City (17–8)	9.
10.	Canisius (4–0)	Kansas State (4–0)	Oklahoma A&M (7–1)	Seattle (10–2)	Illinois (6–2)	Vanderbilt (9–2)	Bradley (12–2)	Bradley (13–2)	Wake Forest (15–3)	West Virginia (18–3)	Vanderbilt (15–4)	Indiana (13–6)	Oklahoma City (17–8)	Saint Louis (19–7)	10.
11.	Ohio State (3–0)	Ohio State (3–0)	Oklahoma City (5–1)	Oklahoma A&M (7–1)	Oklahoma City (8–2)	Wake Forest (12–3)	Wake Forest (12–3)	Ohio State (11–3)	West Virginia (15–3)	Wake Forest (16–4)	Indiana (11–6)	West Virginia (20–4)	West Virginia (22–4)	Michigan State (14–8)	11.
12.	Western Kentucky (3–0)	Oklahoma A&M (6–1)	Tennessee (5–1)	Tennessee (7–0)	Oklahoma A&M (7–1)	Bradley (10–2)	Ohio State (9–3)	Canisius (14–2)	Ohio State (11–4)	California (13–2)	Wake Forest (16–6)	Kansas State (14–6)	Saint Louis (18–7)	Memphis State (21–5)	12.
13.	West Virginia (3–0)	Duke (4–1)	Vanderbilt (6–0)	Manhattan (7–2)	Wake Forest (10–3)	Oklahoma City (9–3)	Vanderbilt (10–3)	Wake Forest (12–3)	Oklahoma City (12–6)	Oklahoma City (12–6)	Oklahoma City (15–7)	Wake Forest (18–6)	Bradley (19–5)	California (20–4)	13.
14.	Kansas State (2–0)	Iowa State (5–0)	Iowa State (6–0)	Western Kentucky (6–2)	Canisius (10–1)	Canisius (11–2)	Canisius (12–2)	Tulane (10–5)	Canisius (15–2)	Canisius (16–3)	West Virginia (19–4)	Saint Louis (16–7)	California (18–4)	UCLA (22–4)	14.
15.	Dayton (2–1)	Oklahoma City (2–1) т	Western Kentucky (6–1)	Canisius (8–1)	Duke (7–3)	West Virginia (11–3)	Duke (8–4)	California (11–2)	Illinois (10–3)	West Virginia Tech (15–1)	California (15–2)	Idaho State (23–2)	Idaho State (23–3)	Mississippi State (17–8)	15.
16.	Niagara (2–1)	St. John's (2–1) т	Tulane (6–1)	Saint Louis (6–4)	Tennessee (8–1)	Duke (8–4)	Oklahoma City (9–3)	Oklahoma City (10–5)	Memphis State (17–3)	Illinois (11–4)	Duke (11–8)	Iowa State (15–6)	Oklahoma A&M (16–8)	Idaho State (24–2)	16.
17.	Iowa State (3–0)	Alabama (4–1)	Canisius (6–1)	Oklahoma City (5–2)	Saint Louis (7–4)	Ohio State (7–3)	West Virginia (12–3)	Idaho State (13–3)	Purdue (12–2)	Duke (10–7)	Kansas State (12–6)	Oklahoma A&M (13–8)	Iowa State (16–6)	Notre Dame (18–7)	17.
18.	Oklahoma City (1–1)	Canisius (4–1)	Seattle (7–2)	Wake Forest (8–3)	West Virginia (9–3)	Western Kentucky (7–4)	Tulane (10–5)	West Virginia (13–3)	Vanderbilt (11–4)	Indiana (9–6)	West Virginia Tech (21–1)	Oklahoma City (16–8)	Mississippi State (17–8)	Wake Forest (19–9)	18.
19.	Oklahoma A&M (3–1)	NC State (4–2)	San Francisco (6–2)	West Virginia (8–3)	Minnesota (5–3)	California (10–2)	California (10–2)	Duke (8–4)	California (11–2)	Vanderbilt (13–4)	Mississippi State (13–7)	Memphis State (20–5)	Memphis State (21–5)	Bradley (19–7)	19.
20.	Seattle (3–1)	Western Kentucky (3–1)	Idaho State (8–0)	Memphis State (9–1)	Western Kentucky (6–2)	Oklahoma A&M (7–3)	Western Kentucky (8–4)	Oklahoma A&M (9–4)	Idaho State (17–2)	Saint Louis (14–6)	Memphis State (19–4)	Mississippi State (13–8)	Wake Forest (18–8)	Canisius (20–5) т Oklahoma A&M (17–9) т	20.
	Week 1 Dec. 10	Week 2 Dec. 17	Week 3 Dec. 26	Week 4 Jan. 2	Week 5 Jan. 7	Week 6 Jan. 14	Week 7 Jan. 21	Week 8 Jan. 28	Week 9 Feb. 4	Week 10 Feb. 11	Week 11 Feb. 18	Week 12 Feb. 25	Week 13 Mar. 4	Final Mar. 11	
		Dropped: Dayton; Niagara; Seattle	Dropped: Kansas State (4–2); Ohio State (3–1); St. John's; Alabama; NC State	Dropped: Duke; Tulane; San Francisco (6–4); Idaho State	Dropped: Manhattan (7–3); Memphis State	Dropped: Tennessee; Saint Louis; Minnesota	Dropped: Oklahoma A&M (8–3)	Dropped: Vanderbilt; Western Kentucky	Dropped: Tulane; Duke; Oklahoma A&M (11–4)	Dropped: Ohio State (11–6); Memphis State; Purdue; Idaho State	Dropped: Canisius; Illinois; Saint Louis	Dropped: California; Duke; West Virginia Tech	Dropped: Indiana (13–8); Kansas State (15–7)	Dropped: Iowa State (16–7)	

== UP Poll ==
	Preseason	Week 2 Dec. 11	Week 3 Dec. 18	Week 4 Dec. 26	Week 5 Jan. 2	Week 6 Jan. 8	Week 7 Jan. 15	Week 8 Jan. 22	Week 9 Jan. 29	Week 10 Feb. 5	Week 11 Feb. 12	Week 12 Feb. 19	Week 13 Feb. 26	Week 14 Mar. 5	Final Mar. 12	
1.	Kansas	Kansas (2–0)	Kansas (4–0)	Kansas (6–0)	Kansas (9–0)	Kansas (10–0)	Kansas (12–0)	North Carolina (15–0)	North Carolina (16–0)	North Carolina (16–0)	North Carolina (18–0)	North Carolina (20–0)	North Carolina (22–0)	North Carolina (24–0)	North Carolina (27–0)	1.
2.	Louisville	North Carolina (2–0)	North Carolina (4–0)	North Carolina (8–0)	North Carolina (11–0)	North Carolina (11–0)	North Carolina (14–0)	Kansas (12–1)	Kansas (12–1)	Kansas (13–1)	Kansas (14–1)	Kansas (16–1)	Kansas (18–1)	Kansas (19–1)	Kansas (21–2)	2.
3.	North Carolina	Illinois (2–0)	Illinois (3–0)	Kentucky (6–2)	Kentucky (8–2)	Kentucky (9–2)	Kentucky (11–2)	Kentucky (12–3)	Kentucky (13–3)	Kentucky (16–3)	Kentucky (17–3)	Kentucky (18–4)	Kentucky (20–4)	Kentucky (22–4)	Kentucky (22–4)	3.
4.	Illinois	SMU (2–0)	San Francisco (5–0)	SMU (7–1)	SMU (10–1)	SMU (11–1)	SMU (13–1)	Iowa State (11–2)	SMU (14–2)	SMU (15–2)	SMU (16–3)	SMU (17–3)	SMU (19–3)	SMU (21–3)	SMU (21–3)	4.
5.	SMU	San Francisco (4–0)	SMU (5–0)	Saint Louis (6–1)	Louisville (7–2)	Louisville (8–2)	UCLA (13–1)	SMU (14–2)	UCLA (13–1)	UCLA (15–1)	Bradley (15–2)	Bradley (17–3) т	UCLA (20–2)	UCLA (21–4)	Seattle (22–2)	5.
6.	Dayton	Louisville (3–1)	Louisville (4–1)	Illinois (5–1)	Illinois (6–1)	UCLA (11–1)	Louisville (9–2)	Louisville (11–2)	Louisville (12–2)	Louisville (14–3)	UCLA (16–2)	UCLA (18–2) т	Seattle (20–2)	Seattle (22–2)	California (20–4)	6.
7.	Temple	Kentucky (3–0)	Kentucky (4–1)	Louisville (5–2)	Iowa State (8–1)	Iowa State (8–1)	Illinois (8–2)	UCLA (13–1)	Illinois (10–2)	Seattle (17–2)	Seattle (18–2)	Seattle (19–2)	Indiana (13–6)	California (18–4)	Michigan State (14–8)	7.
8.	San Francisco	Ohio State (3–0)	Kansas State (4–0)	West Virginia (8–0)	UCLA (8–1)	Oklahoma A&M (7–1)	Iowa State (9–2)	Illinois (9–2)	Ohio State (11–3)	Bradley (13–2)	Louisville (15–4)	Louisville (17–4)	Bradley (18–4)	Michigan State (14–7)	Louisville (21–5)	8.
9.	Saint Louis	Kansas State (2–0)	Saint Louis (4–1)	Oklahoma A&M (7–1)	Oklahoma A&M (7–1)	Vanderbilt (8–1)	Seattle (13–2)	Seattle (14–2)	Iowa State (11–3)	Ohio State (11–4)	California (13–2)	California (15–2)	California (17–3)	Louisville (20–5)	UCLA (22–4) т	9.
10.	Western Kentucky	Dayton (2–1)	Oklahoma A&M (6–1)	Iowa State (6–0)	Manhattan (7–2)	Illinois (6–2)	Vanderbilt (9–2)	Ohio State (9–3)	Seattle (17–2)	Iowa State (12–4)	Iowa State (14–4)	Iowa State (15–5)	Louisville (18–5)	Bradley (19–5)	Saint Louis (19–7) т	10.
11.	West Virginia	Canisius (4–0)	Ohio State (3–0)	Kansas State (4–2)	Vanderbilt (6–1)	Canisius (10–1)	Wake Forest (12–3)	Bradley (12–2)	Bradley (13–2)	Canisius (15–2)	Canisius (16–3)	Indiana (11–6)	Michigan State (12–7)	Saint Louis (18–7)	West Virginia (25–4)	11.
12.	Oklahoma City	NC State (3–0) т	Iowa State (5–0)	Duke (5–1)	West Virginia (8–3)	Seattle (11–2)	Canisius (11–2)	California (10–2)	Canisius (14–2) т	Illinois (10–3) т	Illinois (11–4)	BYU (16–6)	Kansas State (14–6) т	West Virginia (22–4) т	Dayton (17–6)	12.
13.	Oregon State	Western Kentucky (1–0) т	West Virginia (6–0)	Vanderbilt (5–1)	Canisius (8–1)	Minnesota (5–3)	California (10–2)	Canisius (12–2)	California (11–2) т	California (11–2) т	Indiana (9–6)	Vanderbilt (15–4)	Saint Louis (16–7) т	Dayton (17–6) т	Bradley (19–7)	13.
14.	Kentucky	Iowa State (3–0) т	St. John's (2–1)	UCLA (6–1)	Saint Louis (6–4)	Wake Forest (10–3)	Bradley (10–2)	Wake Forest (12–3)	Wake Forest (12–3)	Purdue (12–2)	Wake Forest (16–4)	Dayton (14–5) т	Iowa State (15–6)	Indiana (13–8) т	BYU (18–8)	14.
15.	Washington	UCLA (3–0)	Canisius (4–1)	Canisius (6–1)	Wake Forest (8–3)	Saint Louis (7–4) т	Ohio State (7–3)	Vanderbilt (10–3)	Vanderbilt (10–4)	Wake Forest (15–3)	BYU (14–6) т	Ohio State (12–6) т	Vanderbilt (16–5) т	Vanderbilt (16–5) т	Indiana (14–8)	15.
16.	St. John's т	West Virginia (3–0)	Duke (4–1)	Utah (7–1)	California (6–2)	Manhattan (7–3) т	BYU (9–5)	BYU (9–6)	BYU (11–6) т	BYU (12–6)	Ohio State (11–6) т	West Virginia (19–4)	West Virginia (20–4) т	BYU (18–8) т	Oklahoma City (17–8) т	16.
17.	NC State т	Indiana (2–0)	Western Kentucky (3–1)	San Francisco (6–2)	Seattle (10–2)	BYU (7–5)	Saint Louis (8–5)	Duke (8–4)	Saint Louis (11–5) т	Syracuse (11–3) т	Syracuse (13–3)	Canisius (16–5)	BYU (16–8)	Kansas State (15–7) т	Vanderbilt (17–5) т	17.
18.	Kansas State	Niagara (2–1) т	UCLA (4–1)	Tulane (6–1)	Utah (9–2)	Duke (7–3)	West Virginia (11–3)	Tulane (10–5) т	Washington (10–7)	Washington (11–7) т	Oklahoma City (12–6)	Michigan State (12–7)	Dayton (15–6)	Notre Dame (18–7) т	Xavier (19–6) т	18.
19.	Vanderbilt	St. John's (2–1) т	Rice (4–2) т	Ohio State (3–1)	Kansas State (5–4)	California (8–2) т	Oklahoma City (9–3) т	Oklahoma A&M (8–3) т	Duke (8–4)	Saint Louis (12–6)	Dayton (12–5)	Kansas State (12–6)	Oklahoma City (16–8) т	Iowa State (16–6)	Notre Dame (18–7)	19.
20.	Wyoming	Temple (2–1) т	Washington (1–4) т	California (3–1) т Colorado (3–1) т Iowa (3–1) т	NC State (7–5)	San Francisco (7–4) т	Oklahoma A&M (7–3) т	Saint Louis (10–5) т	Syracuse (10–3)	Western Kentucky (11–4)	Vanderbilt (13–4) т Temple (13–5) т	Saint Louis (15–7)	Notre Dame (15–7) т Ohio (13–8) т	Ohio State (14–7)	Kansas State (15–8)	20.
	Preseason	Week 2 Dec. 11	Week 3 Dec. 18	Week 4 Dec. 26	Week 5 Jan. 2	Week 6 Jan. 8	Week 7 Jan. 15	Week 8 Jan. 22	Week 9 Jan. 29	Week 10 Feb. 5	Week 11 Feb. 12	Week 12 Feb. 19	Week 13 Feb. 26	Week 14 Mar. 5	Final Mar. 12	
		Dropped: Saint Louis; Oklahoma City; Oregon State; Washington; Vanderbilt; Wyoming	Dropped: Dayton; NC State; Indiana; Niagara; Temple	Dropped: St. John's; Western Kentucky; Rice; Washington	Dropped: Duke; San Francisco; Tulane; Ohio State; Colorado; Iowa	Dropped: West Virginia; Utah; Kansas State; NC State	Dropped: Minnesota; Manhattan; Duke; San Francisco	Dropped: West Virginia; Oklahoma City	Dropped: Tulane; Oklahoma A&M	Dropped: Vanderbilt; Duke	Dropped: Purdue; Washington; Saint Louis; Western Kentucky	Dropped: Illinois; Wake Forest; Syracuse; Oklahoma City; Temple	Dropped: Ohio State; Canisius	Dropped: Oklahoma City; Ohio	Dropped: Iowa State (16–7); Ohio State (14–8)	
