= Joseph Curran (basketball) =

American basketball player and coach

Biographical details
- Born: June 28, 1922; Hornell, New York, U.S.
- Died: January 28, 2012 (aged 89); Mystic, Connecticut, U.S.

Playing career
- 1943–1944: Penn State

Coaching career (HC unless noted)
- 1953–1959: Canisius

Head coaching record
- Overall: 76–66 (.535)

J. Joseph Curran (June 28, 1922 – January 28, 2012) was an American college basketball coach. He coached at Canisius College in Buffalo, New York from 1953 to 1959.

Curran served in the United States Navy during World War II, then attended Canisius, Cornell and Pennsylvania State University after the war – playing basketball at Penn State during the 1943–44 season.

Curran became the coach at Canisius in 1953. He coached for the Golden Griffins for six seasons, leading them to three consecutive NCAA tournaments in 1955, 1956 and 1957. Their 79–77 upset of North Carolina State in four overtimes in 1956 is considered one of the biggest upsets in NCAA Tournament history. Curran's all-time record at Canisius was 76–66.

Joseph Curran died on January 28, 2012.

== Head coaching record ==
Record table
| Season | Team | Overall | Conference | Standing | Postseason |
|---|---|---|---|---|---|
Canisius Golden Griffins (Western New York Little Three Conference) (1953–1958)
| 1953–54 | Canisius | 9–14 | 1–3 | 3rd | |
| 1954–55 | Canisius | 18–7 | 2–2 | 2nd | NCAA Sweet 16 |
| 1955–56 | Canisius | 19–7 | 4–0 | 1st | NCAA Sweet 16 |
| 1956–57 | Canisius | 22–6 | 3–1 | T–1st | NCAA University Division Sweet 16 |
| 1957–58 | Canisius | 2–19 | 0–2 | T-2nd | |
Canisius Golden Griffins (Independent) (1958–1959)
| 1958–59 | Canisius | 6–13 | | | |
| Canisius: | | 76–66 (.535) | 10–8 (.556) | | |
| Total: | | 76–66 (.535) | | | |
National champion Postseason invitational champion Conference regular season champion Conference regular season and conference tournament champion Division regular season champion Division regular season and conference tournament champion Conference tournament champion
