= 1956–57 Georgia Bulldogs basketball team =

American college basketball season

1956–57 Georgia Bulldogs basketball
- Conference: Southeastern Conference
- Record: 8–16 (4–12 SEC)
- Head coach: Harbin Lawson (6th season)
- Captain: Curtis Gleaton
- Home arena: Woodruff Hall

1956–57 Southeastern Conference men's basketball standings
	Conf.				Overall
Team	W		L	PCT	W		L	PCT
No. 3 Kentucky	12	–	2	.857	23	–	5	.821
No. 8 Vanderbilt	11	–	4	.733	17	–	5	.773
Georgia Tech	12	–	5	.706	18	–	8	.692
No. 15 Mississippi State	9	–	5	.643	17	–	8	.680
Tulane	9	–	5	.643	15	–	9	.625
Auburn	8	–	7	.533	13	–	8	.619
Alabama	7	–	7	.500	15	–	11	.577
Florida	6	–	8	.429	14	–	10	.583
Tennessee	5	–	9	.357	13	–	9	.591
Ole Miss	4	–	11	.267	9	–	12	.429
Georgia	4	–	12	.250	8	–	16	.333
LSU	1	–	13	.071	6	–	19	.240
Rankings from AP Poll

The 1956–57 Georgia Bulldogs basketball team represented the University of Georgia as a member of the Southeastern Conference (SEC) during the 1956–57 NCAA University Division men's basketball season. Led by sixth-year head coach Harbin Lawson, the Bulldogs compiled an overall record of 8–16 with a mark of 4–12 conference play, placing 11th in the SEC. The team captain was Curtis Gleaton.

== Roster ==
1956–57 Georgia Bulldogs men's basketball team
Players
Coaches

Pos.	#	Name	Height	Weight	Year	Previous school	Hometown
G		Ray Allen	6 ft 1 in (1.85 m)	—	Jr
F		Curtis Gleaton	6 ft 4 in (1.93 m)	—
C		Henry Cabaniss	6 ft 5 in (1.96 m)	—	Jr
F		Fred Franks	6 ft 5 in (1.96 m)	—
G		Fred Edmondson	6 ft 0 in (1.83 m)	—	So
F		Sonny Poss	6 ft 4 in (1.93 m)	—	So
F		Joe De Foor	6 ft 2 in (1.88 m)	—	So
G		Don Hartsfield	6 ft 0 in (1.83 m)	—	Jr
G		Bobby Chaney	6 ft 0 in (1.83 m)	—	So
F		Terry Hagan	6 ft 3 in (1.91 m)	—
G		Harold Krafchick	5 ft 11 in (1.8 m)	—
G		Virgil Mills	6 ft 2 in (1.88 m)	—
F		Chuck Kammers	—	—

Head coach

Harbin Lawson

Assistant coach(es)

Legend

- (C) Team captain
- (S) Suspended
- (I) Ineligible
- (W) Walk-on
- Injured
- Current redshirt

== Schedule ==
Date time, TV	Opponent	Result	Record	Site city, state
12/5/1956	Mercer	W 88-77	1–0	Athens, GA
12/8/1956	South Carolina	L 74-97	1–1	Athens, GA
12/18/1956	at Georgia Tech	L 53-80	1–2	
12/21/1956	at South Carolina	L 81-96	1–3	
12/27/1956	Clemson	W 84-76	2–3	Athens, GA
12/28/1956	South Carolina	W 64-62	3–3	Athens, GA
12/31/1956	at Florida	W 69-62	4–3	
1/1/1957	at Florida State	W 72-68	5–3	
1/6/1957	LSU	W 78-70	6–3	Athens, GA
1/7/1957	Tulane	L 54-72	6–4	Athens, GA
1/12/1957	Auburn	W 75-72	7–4	Athens, GA
1/21/1957	Florida State	L 63-86	7–5	Athens, GA
1/23/1957	at Mercer	L 71-91	7–6	
1/26/1957	at Auburn	L 66-73	7–7	
1/28/1957	at Alabama	L 73-89	7–8	
2/2/1957	at Tennessee	L 53-91	7–9	
2/9/1957	Alabama	W 64-52	8–9	Athens, GA
2/14/1957	Georgia Tech	L 65-67	8–10	Athens, GA
2/16/1957	Ole Miss	L 91-99	8–11	Athens, GA
2/18/1957	Mississippi State	L 73-86	8–12	Athens, GA
2/23/1957	at Georgia Tech	L 60-74	8–13	
2/25/1957	at Vanderbilt	L 51-75	8–14	
3/2/1957	Florida	L 65-85	8–15	Athens, GA
*Non-conference game. (#) Tournament seedings in parentheses.
