= Billy McCann =

American basketball coach

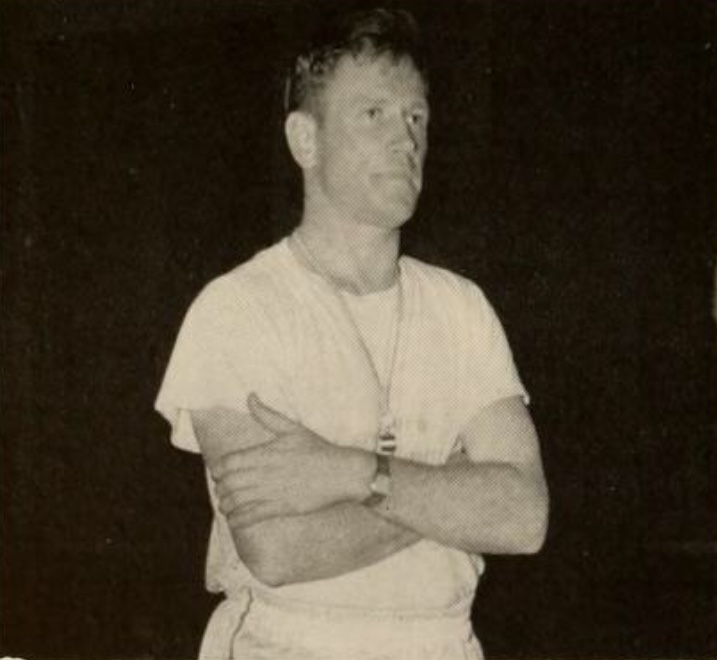
- McCann from the 1951 Kaleidoscope

Biographical details
- Born: September 23, 1919; Richmond, Virginia, U.S.
- Died: July 27, 2002 (aged 82); Mount Pleasant, South Carolina, U.S.

Playing career
- 1939–1941: Virginia

Coaching career (HC unless noted)
- 1950–1952: Hampden–Sydney
- 1952–1957: Washington and Lee
- 1957–1963: Virginia

Head coaching record
- Overall: 123–195

William Thomas McCann Sr. (September 23, 1919 – July 27, 2002) was an American college basketball coach. He served as head basketball coach at Hampden–Sydney College, Washington and Lee University and the University of Virginia.

McCann played basketball and baseball at Virginia. Following his college playing career, he became a high school coach and worked his way up to head coaching positions at Hampden–Sydney and Washington and Lee. He then was named head coach at Virginia in the Atlantic Coast Conference (ACC) in 1957. McCann resigned after the 1962–63 season. His record at Virginia was 40–106.

McCann died on July 27, 2002, at age 82.

== Head coaching record ==
Record table
| Season | Team | Overall | Conference | Standing | Postseason |
|---|---|---|---|---|---|
Hampden–Sydney Tigers (Independent) (1950–1952)
| 1950–51 | Hampden–Sydney | 13–9 | | | |
| 1951–52 | Hampden–Sydney | 14–7 | | | |
| Hampden–Sydney: | | 27–16 (.628) | | | |
Washington and Lee Generals (Southern Conference) (1952–1957)
| 1952–53 | Washington and Lee | 2–20 | 1–17 | 16th | |
| 1953–54 | Washington and Lee | 6–17 | 3–9 | 8th | |
| 1954–55 | Washington and Lee | 16–13 | 8–5 | 4th | |
| 1955–56 | Washington and Lee | 12–16 | 5–8 | 8th | |
| 1956–57 | Washington and Lee | 20–7 | 10–3 | 2nd | |
| Washington and Lee: | | 56–73 (.434) | 27–42 (.391) | | |
Virginia Cavaliers (Atlantic Coast Conference) (1957–1963)
| 1957–58 | Virginia | 10–13 | 6–8 | 5th | |
| 1958–59 | Virginia | 11–14 | 6–8 | 5th | |
| 1959–60 | Virginia | 6–18 | 1–13 | 8th | |
| 1960–61 | Virginia | 3–23 | 2–12 | 8th | |
| 1961–62 | Virginia | 5–18 | 2–12 | 8th | |
| 1962–63 | Virginia | 5–20 | 3–11 | 8th | |
| Virginia: | | 40–106 (.274) | 20–64 (.238) | | |
| Total: | | 123–195 (.387) | | | |
National champion Postseason invitational champion Conference regular season champion Conference regular season and conference tournament champion Division regular season champion Division regular season and conference tournament champion Conference tournament champion
