= 1956–57 San Francisco Dons men's basketball team =

American college basketball season

1956–57 San Francisco Dons men's basketball

West Coast Athletic Conference champions

NCAA men's Division I tournament, Final Four
- Conference: West Coast Athletic Conference
- Record: 21–7 (12–2 WCAC)
- Head coach: Phil Woolpert (7th season)
- Assistant coach: Ross Giudice
- Home arena: Kezar Pavilion

1956–57 West Coast Athletic Conference men's basketball standings
	Conf.				Overall
Team	W		L	PCT	W		L	PCT
San Francisco	12	–	2	.857	21	–	7	.750
Santa Clara	10	–	4	.714	15	–	7	.682
Saint Mary's	10	–	4	.714	17	–	9	.654
Fresno State	7	–	7	.500	16	–	10	.615
San Jose State	7	–	7	.500	13	–	12	.520
Loyola (Calif.)	5	–	9	.357	11	–	16	.407
Pacific	3	–	11	.214	9	–	17	.346
Pepperdine	2	–	12	.143	7	–	18	.280
Rankings from AP Poll

The 1956–57 San Francisco Dons men's basketball team represented the University of San Francisco as a member of the West Coast Athletic Conference during the 1956–57 NCAA men's basketball season. The Dons carried a 55-game unbeaten streak into the season, extending it to a then NCAA record 60-game winning streak. After falling out of the rankings, San Francisco battled back to finish the season with a 21–7 record (12–2 CBA) and reach their third consecutive Final Four. After losing to Kansas in the national semifinals, USF defeated Michigan State in the third-place game.

== Roster ==
1956–57 San Francisco Dons men's basketball team
Players
Coaches

Pos.	#	Name	Height	Weight	Year	Hometown
G	15	Gene Brown	6 ft 3 in (1.91 m)	—	Jr	San Francisco, California
F	17	Mike Farmer	6 ft 7 in (2.01 m)	200 lb (91 kg)	Jr	Richmond, California
F	18	Mike Preaseau	6 ft 5 in (1.96 m)	180 lb (82 kg)	Jr	Redding, California
F	19	Carl Boldt	6 ft 4 in (1.93 m)	—	Sr	Tujunga, California

Head coach

- Phil Woolpert (Loyola Marymount)

Assistant coach(es)

- Ross Giudice (San Francisco)

Legend

- (C) Team captain
- (S) Suspended
- (I) Ineligible
- (W) Walk-on
- Injured
- Current redshirt

== Schedule and results ==
Date time, TV	Rank^{#}	Opponent^{#}	Result	Record	Site city, state
Regular season
Nov 30, 1956*		at Cal State-Chico	W 63–34	1–0	Chico, California
Dec 1, 1956*		at California	W 70–56	2–0	Harmon Gym; Berkeley, California
Dec 7, 1956*		San Francisco State	W 63–34	3–0	Kezar Pavilion; San Francisco, California
Dec 8, 1956*		Seattle	W 57–52	4–0	Kezar Pavilion; San Francisco, California
Dec 14, 1956*	No. 2	at Loyola (Chicago)	W 67–48	5–0	Alumni Gym; Chicago, Illinois
Dec 17, 1956*	No. 2	at No. 7 Illinois	L 33–62	5–1	Huff Hall (6,912); Champaign, Illinois
Dec 19, 1956*	No. 2	vs. No. 20 Western Kentucky	L 57–61	5–2	Freedom Hall; Louisville, Kentucky
Dec 21, 1956*	No. 2	at Washington (MO)	W 56–53	6–2	Francis Field House; St. Louis, Missouri
Dec 28, 1956*	No. 19	at Oregon State	L 40–62	6–3	Oregon State Coliseum; Corvallis, Oregon
Dec 29, 1956*	No. 19	vs. USC	L 52–58	6–4	Oregon State Coliseum; Corvallis, Oregon
Jan 4, 1957		San Jose State	W 66–51	7–4 (1–0)	Kezar Pavilion; San Francisco, California
Jan 8, 1957		at Santa Clara	L 47–51	7–5 (1–1)	San Jose Civic Auditorium; San Jose, California
Jan 12, 1957		Fresno State	W 68–56	8–5 (2–1)	Kezar Pavilion; San Francisco, California
Feb 1, 1957		Pepperdine	W 78–67	9–5 (3–1)	Kezar Pavilion; San Francisco, California
Feb 2, 1957		Loyola (Los Angeles)	W 66–45	10–5 (4–1)	Kezar Pavilion; San Francisco, California
Feb 7, 1957		at Pacific	W 67–51	11–5 (5–1)	Pacific Pavilion; Stockton, California
Feb 8, 1957		Saint Mary's	W 70–60	12–5 (6–1)	Kezar Pavilion; San Francisco, California
Feb 12, 1957*		Santa Clara	W 58–47	13–5 (7–1)	Kezar Pavilion; San Francisco, California
Feb 15, 1957		Pacific	W 67–56	14–5 (8–1)	Kezar Pavilion; San Francisco, California
Feb 16, 1957		at Fresno State	L 51–56	14–6 (8–2)	North Gym; Fresno, California
Feb 22, 1957		at Pepperdine	W 88–66	15–6 (9–2)	Campus Gym; Malibu, California
Feb 23, 1957		at Loyola (Los Angeles)	W 75–65	16–6 (10–2)	Loyola Memorial Gymnasium; Los Angeles, California
Mar 1, 1957		at San Jose State	W 76–65	17–6 (11–2)	Spartan Gym; San Jose, California
Mar 5, 1957		Saint Mary's	W 62–41	18–6 (12–2)	Kezar Pavilion; San Francisco, California
NCAA tournament
Mar 15, 1957*		vs. No. 16 Idaho State; West Regional semifinal	W 66–51	19–6	Oregon State Coliseum; Corvallis, Oregon
Mar 16, 1957*		vs. No. 13 California; West Regional final	W 50–46	20–6	Oregon State Coliseum; Corvallis, Oregon
Mar 22, 1957*		vs. No. 2 Kansas; National semifinal – Final Four	L 56–80	20–7	Municipal Auditorium; Kansas City, Missouri
Mar 23, 1957*		vs. No. 11 Michigan State; National consolation – Third Place	W 67–60	21–7	Municipal Auditorium; Kansas City, Missouri
*Non-conference game. ^{#}Rankings from AP Poll. (#) Tournament seedings in parentheses. W=West. All times are in Pacific Time.

== Rankings ==
Ranking movements Legend: ██ Increase in ranking ██ Decrease in ranking — = Not ranked
	Week															
Poll	Pre	1	2	3	4	5	6	7	8	9	10	11	12	13	14	Final
AP	Not released	2	2	19	—	—	—	—	—	—	—	—	—	—	—	—
Coaches	8	5	4	17	—	19	—	—	—	—	—	—	—	—	—	Not released

== Team players drafted into the NBA ==
Round	Pick	Player	NBA Club
7	50	Carl Boldt	Detroit Pistons
