= 1956–57 Western Kentucky State Hilltoppers basketball team =

American college basketball season

1956–57 Western Kentucky State Hilltoppers basketball

Ohio Valley Conference Co-Champion
- Conference: Ohio Valley Conference
- Record: 17–9 (9–1 OVC)
- Head coach: Edgar Diddle (35th season)
- Assistant coach: Ted Hornback
- Home arena: Health & Physical Education Building

The 1956–57 Western Kentucky State Hilltoppers men's basketball team represented Western Kentucky State College (now known as Western Kentucky University) during the 1956-57 NCAA University Division Basketball season. The Hilltoppers were led by future Naismith Memorial Basketball Hall of Fame coach Edgar Diddle. One of the highlights of the season was a victory over 2nd ranked San Francisco at the newly opened Freedom Hall dedication. Western finished tied for the Ohio Valley Conference championship, however, the NCAA tournament bid went to co-champion, Morehead State. Ralph Crosthwaite and Owen Lawson were named to the All-Conference Team.

== Schedule ==
Date time, TV	Rank^{#}	Opponent^{#}	Result	Record	Site city, state
Regular Season
12/19/1956	No. 20	vs. No. 2 San Francisco; Freedom Hall Dedication	W 61–57	4–1	Freedom Hall; Louisville, KY
*Non-conference game. ^{#}Rankings from AP Poll. (#) Tournament seedings in parentheses.
