= Big Eight Conference Men's Basketball Player of the Year =

Former college basketball award

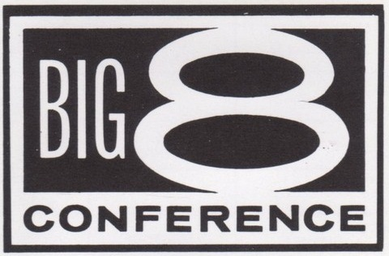
- Awarded for: the most outstanding basketball player in the Big Eight Conference
- Country: United States

History
- First award: 1957
- Final award: 1996

The Big Eight Conference Men's Basketball Player of the Year was an annual award given to the Big Eight Conference's most outstanding player. The award was first given following the 1956–57 season and concluded after the 1995–96 season (the Big Eight disbanded and was re-formed into the present day Big 12 Conference). From 1960 through 1967 no award was given out. Wayman Tisdale of Oklahoma and Danny Manning of Kansas are the only players to have received the award three times. Manning was also the consensus national player of the year in 1988. Four other players won the award twice, last performed by Doug Smith of Missouri (1990, 1991). Missouri also claimed the most winners with eight, followed by Oklahoma with seven.

== Key ==
†	Co-Players of the Year
*	Awarded a national player of the year award that same season: Helms Foundation College Basketball Player of the Year (1904–05 to 1978–79); UPI College Basketball Player of the Year (1954–55 to 1995–96); Oscar Robertson Trophy (1958–59 to present); Naismith College Player of the Year (1968–69 to present); John R. Wooden Award (1976–77 to present)
Player (X)	Denotes the number of times the player has been awarded the Big Eight Player of the Year award at that point

== Winners ==
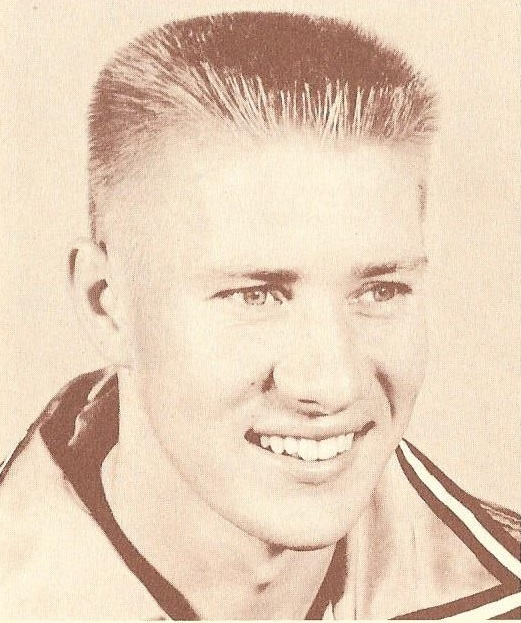
Gary Thompson, Iowa State, 1957

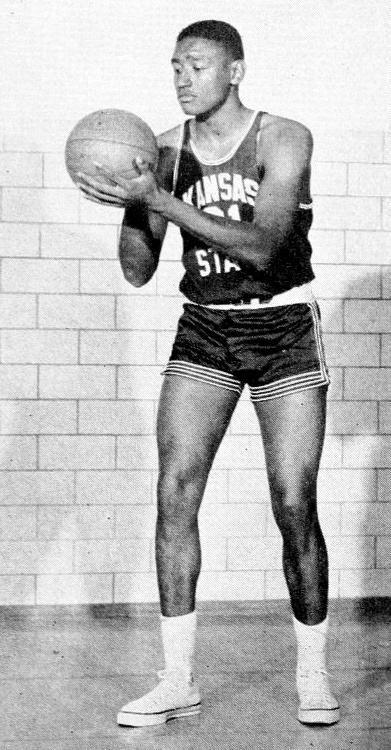
Bob Boozer, Kansas State, 1958 and 1959

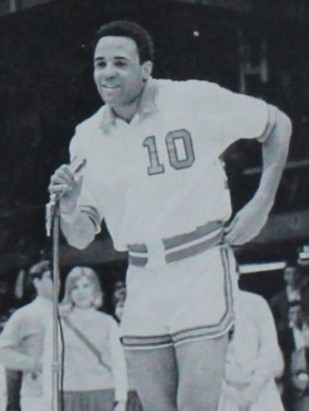
Donald Smith, Iowa State, 1968

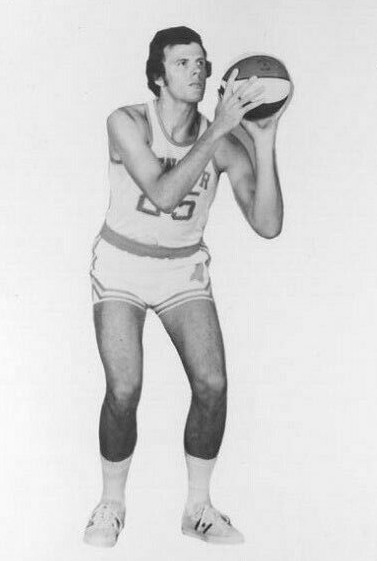
Dave Robisch, Kansas, 1970

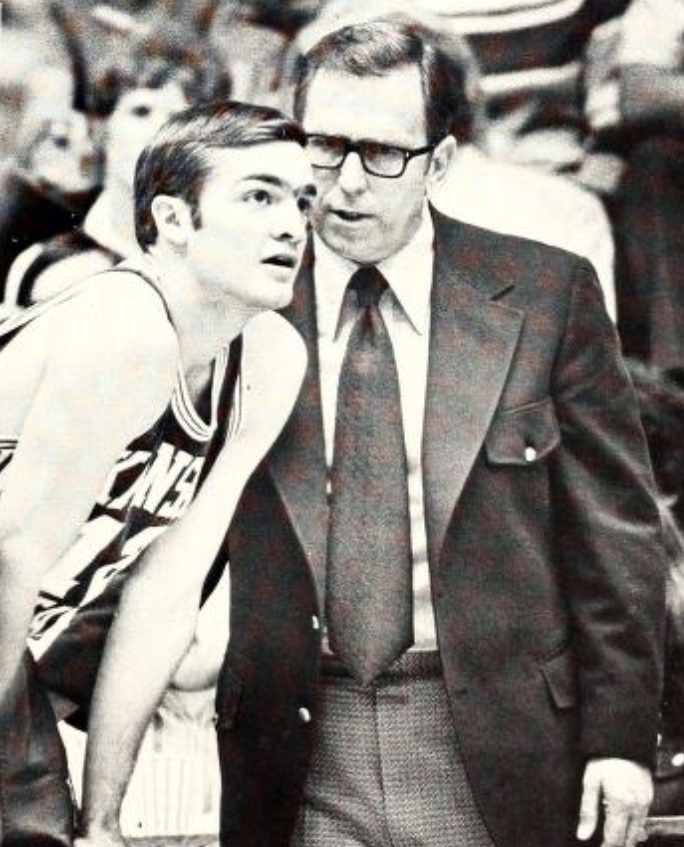
Lon Kruger (left), Kansas State, 1973 and 1974

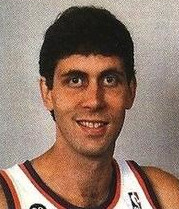
Alvan Adams, Oklahoma, 1975

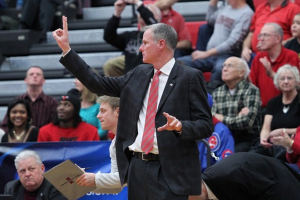
Kim Anderson, Missouri, 1977

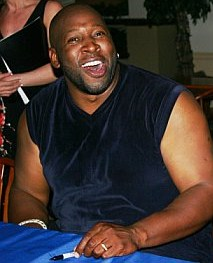
Wayman Tisdale, Oklahoma, 1983 through 1985

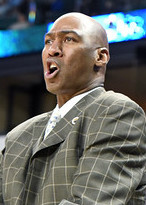
Danny Manning, Kansas, 1986 through 1988

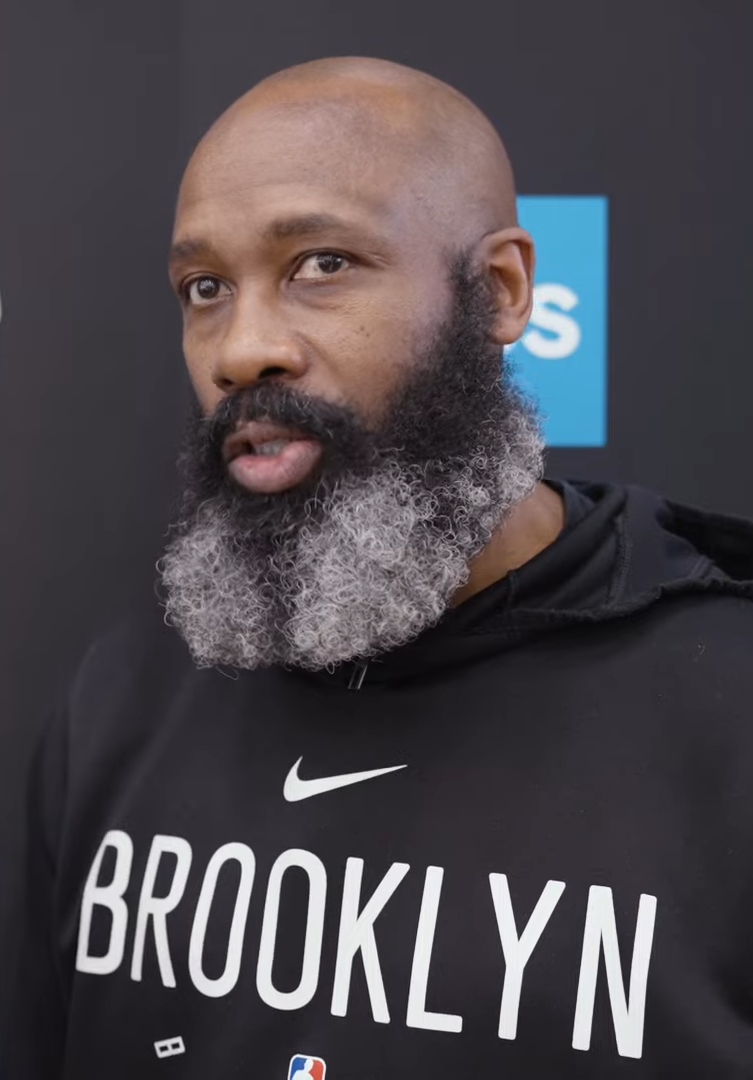
Jacque Vaughn, Kansas, 1996

Season	Player	School	Position	Class	Reference
1956–57	Gary Thompson	Iowa State	G	Senior	
1957–58	Bob Boozer	Kansas State	F	Junior	
1958–59	Bob Boozer (2)	Kansas State	F	Senior	
1959–67	None selected				
1967–68	Donald Smith	Iowa State	C / PF	Senior	
1968–69	Cliff Meely	Colorado	C	Sophomore	
1969–70	Dave Robisch	Kansas	C	Junior	
1970–71	Cliff Meely (2)	Colorado	C	Senior	
1971–72	Bud Stallworth	Kansas	SG	Senior	
1972–73	Lon Kruger	Kansas State	G	Junior	
1973–74	Lon Kruger (2)	Kansas State	G	Senior	
1974–75	Alvan Adams	Oklahoma	C	Junior	
1975–76	Willie Smith	Missouri	PG / SG	Senior	
1976–77	Kim Anderson	Missouri	SF	Senior	
1977–78	Mike Evans	Kansas State	SG / PG	Senior	
1978–79	John McCullough	Oklahoma	SG / SF	Senior	
1979–80	Rolando Blackman	Kansas State	SG	Junior	
1980–81	Andre Smith	Nebraska	C	Senior	
1981–82	Ricky Frazier	Missouri	SF	Senior	
1982–83^{†}	Steve Stipanovich	Missouri	C	Senior	
1982–83^{†}	Wayman Tisdale	Oklahoma	PF	Freshman	
1983–84	Wayman Tisdale (2)	Oklahoma	PF	Sophomore	
1984–85	Wayman Tisdale (3)	Oklahoma	PF	Junior	
1985–86	Danny Manning	Kansas	PF	Sophomore	
1986–87	Danny Manning (2)	Kansas	PF	Junior	
1987–88	Danny Manning* (3)	Kansas	PF	Senior	
1988–89	Stacey King	Oklahoma	C/F	Senior	
1989–90	Doug Smith	Missouri	F	Junior	
1990–91^{†}	Byron Houston	Oklahoma State	SF	Junior	
1990–91^{†}	Doug Smith (2)	Missouri	F	Senior	
1991–92	Anthony Peeler	Missouri	SG	Senior	
1992–93	Bryant Reeves	Oklahoma State	C	Sophomore	
1993–94	Melvin Booker	Missouri	PG	Senior	
1994–95	Ryan Minor	Oklahoma	F	Junior	
1995–96	Jacque Vaughn	Kansas	PG	Junior	

== Winners by school ==
School (year joined)	Winners	Years
Missouri (1907)	8	1976, 1977, 1982, 1983^{†}, 1990, 1991^{†}, 1992, 1994
Oklahoma (1919)	7	1975, 1979, 1983^{†}, 1984, 1985, 1989, 1995
Kansas (1907)	6	1970, 1972, 1986, 1987, 1988, 1996
Kansas State (1913)	6	1958, 1959, 1973, 1974, 1978, 1980
Colorado (1947)	2	1969, 1971
Iowa State (1910)	2	1957, 1968
Oklahoma State (1958)	2	1991^{†}, 1993
Nebraska (1921)	1	1981

== See also ==
- Big 12 Conference Men's Basketball Player of the Year – the successor to the Big Eight Conference and its players of the year (although the Big 12 does not recognize Big Eight Players of the Year as their own)
