= John McCullough (basketball) =

American basketball player and coach

Phoenix Mercury
- Title: Assistant coach
- League: WNBA

Personal information
- Born: October 5, 1956 (age 70) Lima, Ohio, U.S.
- Listed height: 6 ft 4 in (1.93 m)
- Listed weight: 190 lb (86 kg)

Career information
- High school: Lima (Lima, Ohio)
- College: Oklahoma (1975–1979)
- NBA draft: 1979: 4th round, 85th overall pick
- Drafted by: Kansas City Kings
- Playing career: 1981–1985
- Position: Point guard
- Number: 8
- Coaching career: 2016–present

Career history

Playing
- 1981: Phoenix Suns
- 1981–1982: Billings Volcanos
- 1982–1983: Ohio Mixers
- 1983–1985: Pau-Orthez

Coaching
- 1985–1988: SMU (assistant)
- 1988–1995: New Mexico (assistant)
- 1996–2000: New Mexico Highlands
- 2000–2012: Oklahoma Baptist (women)
- 2016–2021: Portland Trail Blazers (assistant)
- 2023–2025: Tulsa (women's assistant)
- 2025–present: Phoenix Mercury (assistant)

Career highlights
- FIBA Korać Cup champion (1984); Big Eight Player of the Year (1979); 2× First-team All-Big Eight (1977, 1979)
- Stats at NBA.com
- Stats at Basketball Reference

John P. McCullough (born October 5, 1956) is an American former basketball player who played in the National Basketball Association (NBA), among other professional leagues. McCullough was the Big Eight Player of the Year and All-American for the Oklahoma Sooners, where he was teammates with future NBA coach Terry Stotts. McCullough was drafted in the fourth round of the 1979 NBA draft by the Kansas City Kings. His only season in the NBA was for the Phoenix Suns in 1981–82. McCullough was an assistant coach at Southern Methodist University and the University of New Mexico before becoming the head coach at New Mexico Highlands University from 1996 to 2000. McCullough was later the head coach of the women's program at Oklahoma Baptist University.

On June 1, 2016, McCullough was promoted to assistant coach by the Portland Trail Blazers after spending the previous four seasons as the team's advance scout.

== Career playing statistics ==
Legend
GP	Games played	GS	Games started	MPG	Minutes per game
FG%	Field goal percentage	3P%	3-point field goal percentage	FT%	Free throw percentage
RPG	Rebounds per game	APG	Assists per game	SPG	Steals per game
BPG	Blocks per game	PPG	Points per game	**Bold**	Career high

=== NBA ===
==== Regular season ====
Year	Team	GP	GS	MPG	FG%	3P%	FT%	RPG	APG	SPG	BPG	PPG
1981–82	Phoenix	8	0	2.9	.692	–	.600	.5	.4	.3	.0	2.6

== Head coaching record ==
=== Men's basketball ===
Record table
Season	Team	Overall	Conference	Standing	Postseason
**New Mexico Highlands Cowboys** (Rocky Mountain Athletic Conference) (1996–2000)
1996–97	New Mexico Highlands	5–21	3–16	6th West	
1997–98	New Mexico Highlands	5–21	3–16	7th West	
1998–99	New Mexico Highlands	6–20	4–15	T–6th West	
1999–2000	New Mexico Highlands	15–12	10–9	3rd West	
New Mexico Highlands:		31–74 (.295)	20–56 (.263)		
Total:		31–74 (.295)			
National champion Postseason invitational champion Conference regular season champion Conference regular season and conference tournament champion Division regular season champion Division regular season and conference tournament champion Conference tournament champion

=== Women's basketball ===
Record table
Season	Team	Overall	Conference	Standing	Postseason
**Oklahoma Baptist Bison** (Sooner Athletic Conference) (2000–2012)
2000–01	Oklahoma Baptist	20–14	7–9		NAIA Second Round
2001–02	Oklahoma Baptist	25–9	12–6		NAIA Second Round
2002–03	Oklahoma Baptist	21–13	11–7		NAIA First Round
2003–04	Oklahoma Baptist	21–14	8–10		NAIA First Round
2004–05	Oklahoma Baptist	24–8	12–6		NAIA First Round
2005–06	Oklahoma Baptist	25–10	10–8		NAIA Elite Eight
2006–07	Oklahoma Baptist	17–13	11–7		NAIA First Round
2007–08	Oklahoma Baptist	29–5	19–3		NAIA First Round
2008–09	Oklahoma Baptist	32–5	20–2		NAIA Fab Four
2009–10	Oklahoma Baptist	31–4	21–1		NAIA Second Round
2010–11	Oklahoma Baptist	12–20	9–13		
2011–12	Oklahoma Baptist	15–16	11–11		
Oklahoma Baptist:		272–131 (.675)	151–83 (.645)		
Total:		272–131 (.675)			
National champion Postseason invitational champion Conference regular season champion Conference regular season and conference tournament champion Division regular season champion Division regular season and conference tournament champion Conference tournament champion
