= 1956–57 NCAA University Division men's basketball season =

Men's university basketball season

- Preseason AP No. 1: None
- NCAA Tournament: 1957
- Tournament dates: March 11, 1957 – March 23, 1957
- National Championship: Municipal Auditorium; Kansas City, Missouri
- NCAA Champions: North Carolina Tar Heels
- Helms National Champions: North Carolina Tar Heels
- Other champions: Bradley Braves (NIT)
- Player of the Year (Helms): Lennie Rosenbluth, North Carolina Tar Heels

The 1956–57 NCAA men's University Division basketball season began in December 1956. It progressed through the regular season and conference tournaments, and concluded with the 1957 NCAA University Division basketball tournament championship game on March 23, 1957, at Municipal Auditorium in Kansas City, Missouri. The North Carolina Tar Heels won their first NCAA national championship with a 54–53 triple-overtime victory over the Kansas Jayhawks.

== Rule changes ==
- The width of the free throw lane (also known as the "key"), increased from 6 to 12 feet (1.8 to 3.7 m).
- When teams lined up along the key for a free throw, it became mandatory that the two spaces adjacent to the end line be occupied by opponents of the player shooting the free throw. Previously, one player from each team occupied the spaces adjacent to the end line, with a player from the home team occupying a space marked "H" and a player from the visiting team occupying a space marked "V."
- Grasping the rim of the basket was deemed a form of unsportsmanlike conduct.

== Season headlines ==
- This was the first season in which NCAA basketball was split into two levels of play – the University Division for 156 schools competing at the highest level of play and the College Division for 285 teams playing at lower levels with limited or no scholarships. It also was the first season in which the NCAA held more than one championship tournament — a 24-team tournament for the University Division and a 32-team tournament for the College Division. In 1973, the University Division would be replaced by Division I and the College Division by Division II and Division III.
- The California Basketball Association was renamed the West Coast Athletic Conference. It would be renamed the West Coast Conference in 1989.
- In the 1957 NCAA University Division basketball tournament, Forddy Anderson of Michigan State and Frank McGuire of North Carolina became the first head coaches to take two different teams to the NCAA tournament Final Four. Anderson had done it previously with Bradley in 1950 and McGuire with St. John's in 1952. McGuire also became the first head coach to take two different teams to the national championship game, having also done that with St. John's in 1952.
- In 1957, the Helms Athletic Foundation retroactively selected its national champions for the seasons from 1900–01 through 1918–19.

== Season outlook ==
=== Pre-season polls ===
The top 20 from the AP Poll and the UP Coaches Poll during the pre-season.

Associated Press
Ranking	Team
1	Kansas
2	Louisville
3	North Carolina
4	Illinois
5	SMU
6	Dayton
7	Temple
8	San Francisco
9	Saint Louis
10	Western Kentucky State
11	West Virginia
12	Oklahoma City
13	Oregon State
14	Kentucky
15	Washington
16 (tie)	NC State
16 (tie)	St. John's
18	Kansas State
19	Vanderbilt
20	Wyoming

UP Coaches
Ranking	Team
1	Kansas
2	Louisville
3	North Carolina
4	Illinois
5	SMU
6	Dayton
7	Temple
8	San Francisco
9	Saint Louis
10	Western Kentucky State
11	West Virginia
12	Oklahoma City
13	Oregon State
14	Kentucky
15	Washington
16 (tie)	NC State
16 (tie)	St. John's
18	Kansas State
19	Vanderbilt
20	Wyoming

== Conference membership changes ==
School	Former conference	New conference
Drake Bulldogs	Independent	Missouri Valley Conference
Texas Tech Red Raiders	Border Conference	NCAA University Division independent

== Regular season ==
=== Conferences ===
==== Conference winners and tournaments ====
Conference	Regular season winner	Conference player of the year	Conference tournament	Tournament venue (City)	Tournament winner
Atlantic Coast Conference	North Carolina	Lennie Rosenbluth, North Carolina	1957 ACC men's basketball tournament	Reynolds Coliseum (Raleigh, North Carolina)	North Carolina
Big Seven Conference	Kansas	Gary Thompson, Iowa State	No Tournament		
Big Ten Conference	Indiana & Michigan State	None Selected	No Tournament		
Border Conference	Texas Western	None Selected	No Tournament		
Ivy League	Yale	None Selected	No Tournament		
Metropolitan New York Conference	NYU	None Selected	No Tournament		
Mid-American Conference	Miami (OH)	None Selected	No Tournament		
Missouri Valley Conference	Saint Louis	None Selected	No Tournament		
Mountain States (Skyline) Conference	BYU	None Selected	No Tournament		
Ohio Valley Conference	Morehead State & Western Kentucky State	None Selected	No Tournament		
Pacific Coast Conference	California	None Selected	No Tournament		
Southeastern Conference	Kentucky	None Selected	No Tournament		
Southern Conference	West Virginia	Rod Hundley, West Virginia	1957 Southern Conference men's basketball tournament	Richmond Arena (Richmond, Virginia)	West Virginia
Southwest Conference	SMU	None Selected	No Tournament		
West Coast Athletic Conference	San Francisco	Mike Farmer, San Francisco	No Tournament		
Western New York Little Three Conference	Canisius & St. Bonaventure		No Tournament		
Yankee Conference	Connecticut	None selected	No Tournament		

==== Conference standings ====
1956–57 ACC men's basketball standings
	Conf.				Overall
Team	W		L	PCT	W		L	PCT
No. 1 North Carolina†	14	–	0	1.000	32	–	0	1.000
Maryland	9	–	5	.643	16	–	10	.615
Duke	8	–	6	.571	13	–	11	.542
No. 18 Wake Forest	7	–	7	.500	19	–	9	.679
NC State	7	–	7	.500	15	–	11	.577
South Carolina	5	–	9	.357	17	–	12	.586
Virginia	3	–	11	.214	6	–	19	.240
Clemson	3	–	11	.214	7	–	17	.292
† 1957 ACC tournament winner Rankings from AP Poll

1956–57 Big Seven Conference men's basketball standings
	Conf.				Overall
Team	W		L	PCT	W		L	PCT
No. 2 Kansas	11	–	1	.917	24	–	3	.889
Kansas State	8	–	4	.667	15	–	8	.652
Iowa State	6	–	6	.500	16	–	7	.696
Colorado	5	–	7	.417	14	–	9	.609
Nebraska	5	–	7	.417	11	–	12	.478
Missouri	4	–	8	.333	10	–	13	.435
Oklahoma	3	–	9	.250	8	–	15	.348
Rankings from AP Poll

1956–57 Big Ten Conference men's basketball standings
	Conf.				Overall
Team	W		L	PCT	W		L	PCT
Indiana	10	–	4	.714	14	–	8	.636
No. 11 Michigan State	10	–	4	.714	16	–	10	.615
Minnesota	9	–	5	.643	14	–	8	.636
Ohio State	9	–	5	.643	14	–	8	.636
Purdue	8	–	6	.571	15	–	7	.682
Michigan	8	–	6	.571	13	–	9	.591
Illinois	7	–	7	.500	14	–	8	.636
Iowa	4	–	10	.286	8	–	14	.364
Wisconsin	3	–	11	.214	5	–	17	.227
Northwestern	2	–	12	.143	6	–	16	.273
Rankings from AP Poll

1956–57 Border Conference men's basketball standings
	Conf.				Overall
Team	W		L	PCT	W		L	PCT
Texas Western	8	–	2	.800	14	–	8	.636
Hardin–Simmons	7	–	3	.700	17	–	9	.654
Arizona	5	–	5	.500	13	–	13	.500
Arizona State–Tempe	4	–	6	.400	10	–	15	.400
West Texas State	3	–	7	.300	6	–	14	.300
New Mexico A&M	3	–	7	.300	6	–	18	.250
Rankings from AP Poll

1956–57 Ivy League men's basketball standings
	Conf.				Overall
Team	W		L	PCT	W		L	PCT
Yale	12	–	2	.857	18	–	8	.692
Dartmouth	10	–	4	.714	18	–	7	.720
Columbia	9	–	5	.643	18	–	6	.750
Princeton	9	–	5	.643	14	–	9	.609
Harvard	7	–	7	.500	12	–	9	.571
Brown	4	–	10	.286	8	–	16	.333
Pennsylvania	3	–	11	.214	7	–	19	.269
Cornell	2	–	12	.143	4	–	19	.174
Rankings from AP Poll

1956–57 Metropolitan New York Conference men's basketball standings
	Conf.				Overall
Team	W		L	PCT	W		L	PCT
NYU	3	–	1	.750	8	–	13	.381
St. John's	4	–	2	.667	14	–	9	.609
Fordham	2	–	2	.500	16	–	10	.615
Manhattan	2	–	2	.500	5	–	9	.357
CCNY	3	–	4	.429	11	–	8	.579
St. Francis (NY)	1	–	2	.333	12	–	14	.462
Brooklyn	1	–	3	.250	11	–	7	.611
Rankings from AP Poll

1956–57 Mid-American Conference men's basketball standings
	Conf.				Overall
Team	W		L	PCT	W		L	PCT
Miami (Ohio)	11	–	1	.917	17	–	8	.680
Marshall	8	–	4	.667	15	–	9	.625
Ohio	7	–	5	.583	15	–	8	.652
Bowling Green	7	–	5	.583	14	–	9	.609
Western Michigan	4	–	8	.333	8	–	13	.381
Toledo	3	–	9	.250	5	–	19	.208
Kent State	2	–	10	.167	5	–	18	.217
Rankings from AP Poll

1956–57 Missouri Valley Conference men's basketball standings
	Conf.				Overall
Team	W		L	PCT	W		L	PCT
No. 10 Saint Louis	12	–	2	.857	19	–	9	.679
No. 19 Bradley	9	–	5	.643	22	–	7	.759
No. 20 Oklahoma A&M	8	–	6	.571	17	–	9	.654
Wichita Municipal	8	–	6	.571	15	–	11	.577
Detroit	5	–	9	.357	11	–	15	.423
Houston	5	–	9	.357	10	–	16	.385
Tulsa	5	–	9	.357	8	–	17	.320
Drake	4	–	10	.286	8	–	16	.333
Rankings from AP Poll

1956–57 Mountain States Conference men's basketball standings
	Conf.				Overall
Team	W		L	PCT	W		L	PCT
BYU	11	–	3	.786	19	–	9	.679
Utah	10	–	4	.714	19	–	8	.704
Montana	9	–	5	.643	13	–	9	.591
Denver	8	–	6	.571	11	–	12	.478
Utah State	7	–	7	.500	11	–	13	.458
Colorado A&M	6	–	8	.429	9	–	16	.360
Wyoming	4	–	10	.286	6	–	19	.240
New Mexico	1	–	13	.071	5	–	21	.192
Rankings from AP Poll

1956–57 Ohio Valley Conference men's basketball standings
	Conf.				Overall
Team	W		L	PCT	W		L	PCT
Morehead State	9	–	1	.900	19	–	8	.704
Western Kentucky State	9	–	1	.900	17	–	9	.654
Murray State	5	–	5	.500	11	–	13	.458
Eastern Kentucky State	4	–	6	.400	6	–	15	.286
Middle Tennessee		–		–	12	–	13	.480
Tennessee Tech	1	–	9	.100	9	–	11	.450
Rankings from AP Poll

1956–57 Pacific Coast Conference men's basketball standings
	Conf.				Overall
Team	W		L	PCT	W		L	PCT
No. 13 California	14	–	2	.875	21	–	5	.808
No. 14 UCLA	13	–	3	.813	22	–	4	.846
Washington	13	–	3	.813	17	–	9	.654
USC	9	–	7	.563	16	–	12	.571
Stanford	7	–	9	.438	11	–	15	.423
Oregon State	6	–	10	.375	11	–	15	.423
Idaho	4	–	12	.250	10	–	16	.385
Washington State	4	–	12	.250	8	–	18	.308
Oregon	2	–	14	.125	4	–	21	.160
Rankings from AP Poll

1956–57 Southeastern Conference men's basketball standings
	Conf.				Overall
Team	W		L	PCT	W		L	PCT
No. 3 Kentucky	12	–	2	.857	23	–	5	.821
No. 8 Vanderbilt	11	–	4	.733	17	–	5	.773
Georgia Tech	12	–	5	.706	18	–	8	.692
No. 15 Mississippi State	9	–	5	.643	17	–	8	.680
Tulane	9	–	5	.643	15	–	9	.625
Auburn	8	–	7	.533	13	–	8	.619
Alabama	7	–	7	.500	15	–	11	.577
Florida	6	–	8	.429	14	–	10	.583
Tennessee	5	–	9	.357	13	–	9	.591
Ole Miss	4	–	11	.267	9	–	12	.429
Georgia	4	–	12	.250	8	–	16	.333
LSU	1	–	13	.071	6	–	19	.240
Rankings from AP Poll

1956–57 Southern Conference men's basketball standings
	Conf.				Overall
Team	W		L	PCT	W		L	PCT
No. 7 West Virginia †	12	–	0	1.000	25	–	5	.833
Washington and Lee	10	–	3	.769	20	–	7	.741
Virginia Tech	12	–	5	.706	14	–	8	.636
Furman	7	–	5	.583	10	–	17	.370
Richmond	9	–	7	.563	15	–	11	.577
William & Mary	7	–	11	.389	9	–	18	.333
The Citadel	5	–	9	.357	11	–	14	.440
Davidson	4	–	8	.333	7	–	20	.259
George Washington	3	–	9	.250	3	–	21	.125
VMI	1	–	13	.071	4	–	22	.154
† Southern Conference Tournament winner Rankings from AP Poll

1956–57 Southwest Conference men's basketball standings
	Conf.				Overall
Team	W		L	PCT	W		L	PCT
No. 4 SMU	11	–	1	.917	22	–	4	.846
Rice	8	–	4	.667	16	–	8	.667
TCU	6	–	6	.500	14	–	10	.583
Baylor	6	–	6	.500	9	–	15	.375
Arkansas	5	–	7	.417	11	–	12	.478
Texas	3	–	9	.250	11	–	13	.458
Texas A&M	3	–	9	.250	7	–	17	.292
Rankings from AP Poll

1956–57 West Coast Athletic Conference men's basketball standings
	Conf.				Overall
Team	W		L	PCT	W		L	PCT
San Francisco	12	–	2	.857	21	–	7	.750
Santa Clara	10	–	4	.714	15	–	7	.682
Saint Mary's	10	–	4	.714	17	–	9	.654
Fresno State	7	–	7	.500	16	–	10	.615
San Jose State	7	–	7	.500	13	–	12	.520
Loyola (Calif.)	5	–	9	.357	11	–	16	.407
Pacific	3	–	11	.214	9	–	17	.346
Pepperdine	2	–	12	.143	7	–	18	.280
Rankings from AP Poll

1956–57 Western New York Little Three Conference men's basketball standings
	Conf.				Overall
Team	W		L	PCT	W		L	PCT
No. 20 Canisius	3	–	1	.750	22	–	6	.786
St. Bonaventure	3	–	1	.750	17	–	7	.708
Niagara	0	–	4	.000	12	–	13	.480
Rankings from AP Poll

1956–57 Yankee Conference men's basketball standings
	Conf.				Overall
Team	W		L	PCT	W		L	PCT
Connecticut	8	–	0	1.000	17	–	8	.680
Rhode Island	6	–	3	.667	11	–	11	.500
Vermont	3	–	2	.600	15	–	5	.750
Massachusetts	4	–	4	.500	13	–	11	.542
Maine	2	–	6	.250	6	–	14	.300
New Hampshire	1	–	9	.100	3	–	16	.158

=== University Division independents ===
A total of 44 college teams played as University Division independents. Among them, Seattle (22–3) had the best winning percentage (.880) and Memphis State (24–6) finished with the most wins.

Although it played in the NCAA College Division as a non-major team during the season, Idaho State (25–4) played as an independent and finished the season ranked No. 16 in the final AP Poll.

1956–57 NCAA University Division men's basketball independents standings
	Conf.				Overall
Team	W		L	PCT	W		L	PCT
No. 5 Seattle		–		–	22	–	3	.880
Lafayette		–		–	22	–	5	.815
No. 6 Louisville		–		–	21	–	5	.808
No. 12 Memphis State		–		–	24	–	6	.800
Syracuse		–		–	18	–	7	.720
No. 17 Notre Dame		–		–	20	–	8	.714
Xavier		–		–	20	–	8	.714
Saint Joseph's		–		–	17	–	7	.708
Duquesne		–		–	16	–	7	.696
Temple		–		–	20	–	9	.690
Dayton		–		–	19	–	9	.679
No. 9 Oklahoma City		–		–	19	–	9	.679
Bucknell		–		–	16	–	8	.667
La Salle		–		–	17	–	9	.654
Muhlenberg		–		–	17	–	9	.654
Navy		–		–	15	–	8	.652
Iona		–		–	12	–	7	.632
Seton Hall		–		–	17	–	10	.630
Cincinnati		–		–	15	–	9	.625
Penn State		–		–	15	–	10	.600
Portland		–		–	18	–	12	.600
Pittsburgh		–		–	16	–	11	.593
Colgate		–		–	14	–	10	.583
Loyola (Ill.)		–		–	14	–	10	.583
Kentucky Wesleyan		–		–	16	–	12	.571
Washington University		–		–	12	–	9	.571
Loyola (La.)		–		–	14	–	12	.538
Boston College		–		–	12	–	11	.522
Texas Tech		–		–	12	–	11	.522
Georgetown		–		–	11	–	11	.500
Miami (Fla.)		–		–	13	–	13	.500
Saint Francis (Pa.)		–		–	12	–	12	.500
Holy Cross		–		–	11	–	12	.478
Lehigh		–		–	8	–	10	.444
Butler		–		–	11	–	14	.440
Valparaiso		–		–	11	–	14	.440
Gonzaga		–		–	11	–	16	.407
Marquette		–		–	10	–	15	.400
Villanova		–		–	10	–	15	.400
DePaul		–		–	8	–	14	.364
Army		–		–	7	–	13	.350
Rutgers		–		–	8	–	15	.348
Florida State		–		–	9	–	17	.346
Siena		–		–	5	–	15	.250
Rankings from AP Poll

=== Informal championships ===
Conference	Regular season winner	Most Valuable Player
Philadelphia Big 5	La Salle, St. Joseph's, & Temple	Guy Rodgers, Temple

La Salle, Saint Joseph's, and Temple all finished with 3–1 records in head-to-head competition among the Philadelphia Big 5.

=== Statistical leaders ===
Points per game			Rebound Percentage			Field goal percentage			Free throw percentage		
Player	School	PPG	Player	School	REB%	Player	School	FG%	Player	School	FT%
Grady Wallace	South Carolina	31.2	Elgin Baylor	Seattle	.235	Bailey Howell	Mississippi St.	56.8	Ernie Wiggins	Wake Forest	87.7
Joe Gibbon	Mississippi	30.0	Boo Ellis	Niagara	.234	Alvin Innis	St. Francis (NY)	56.1	Jackie Murdock	Wake Forest	87.5
Elgin Baylor	Seattle	29.7	Charlie Tyra	Louisville	.229	Dennis Roth	Muhlenberg	54.4	Bob Seitz	NC State	87.2
Wilt Chamberlain	Kansas	29.6	Wilt Chamberlain	Kansas	.227	Bob Holtsma	William & Mary	54.2	Dave Ricketts	Duquesne	86.2
Chet Forte	Columbia	28.9	Gene Guarilia	George Washington	.218	Boo Ellis	Niagara	53.7	Bobby Plump	Butler	86.0

== Post-season tournaments ==
=== NCAA tournament ===
Frank McGuire brought the ACC its first national championship as his undefeated North Carolina Tar Heels defeated Wilt Chamberlain and the Kansas Jayhawks in what is considered one of the best games in NCAA history – a 54–53 triple–overtime thriller. Chamberlain was named tournament Most Outstanding Player.

==== Final Four ====
Played at Municipal Auditorium in Kansas City, Missouri

National semifinals
E	North Carolina	74^{(3OT)}
ME	Michigan St.	70
MW	Kansas	80
W	San Francisco	56

National championship game
E	North Carolina	54^{(3OT)}
MW	Kansas	53
National third-place game
ME	Michigan State	60
W	San Francisco	67

=== National Invitation tournament ===
Bradley won its first NIT title, defeating Memphis State in a one-point contest. Memphis State's Win Wilfong won the MVP in a losing cause as he poured in 89 points in the Tigers' four games, including 31 in the final.

==== NIT Semifinals and Final ====
Played at Madison Square Garden in New York City

Semifinals
St. Bonaventure	78
Memphis State	80
Bradley	94
Temple	66

Final
Memphis State	83
Bradley	84
Third place
St. Bonaventure	50
Temple	67

== Award winners ==
=== Consensus All-American teams ===
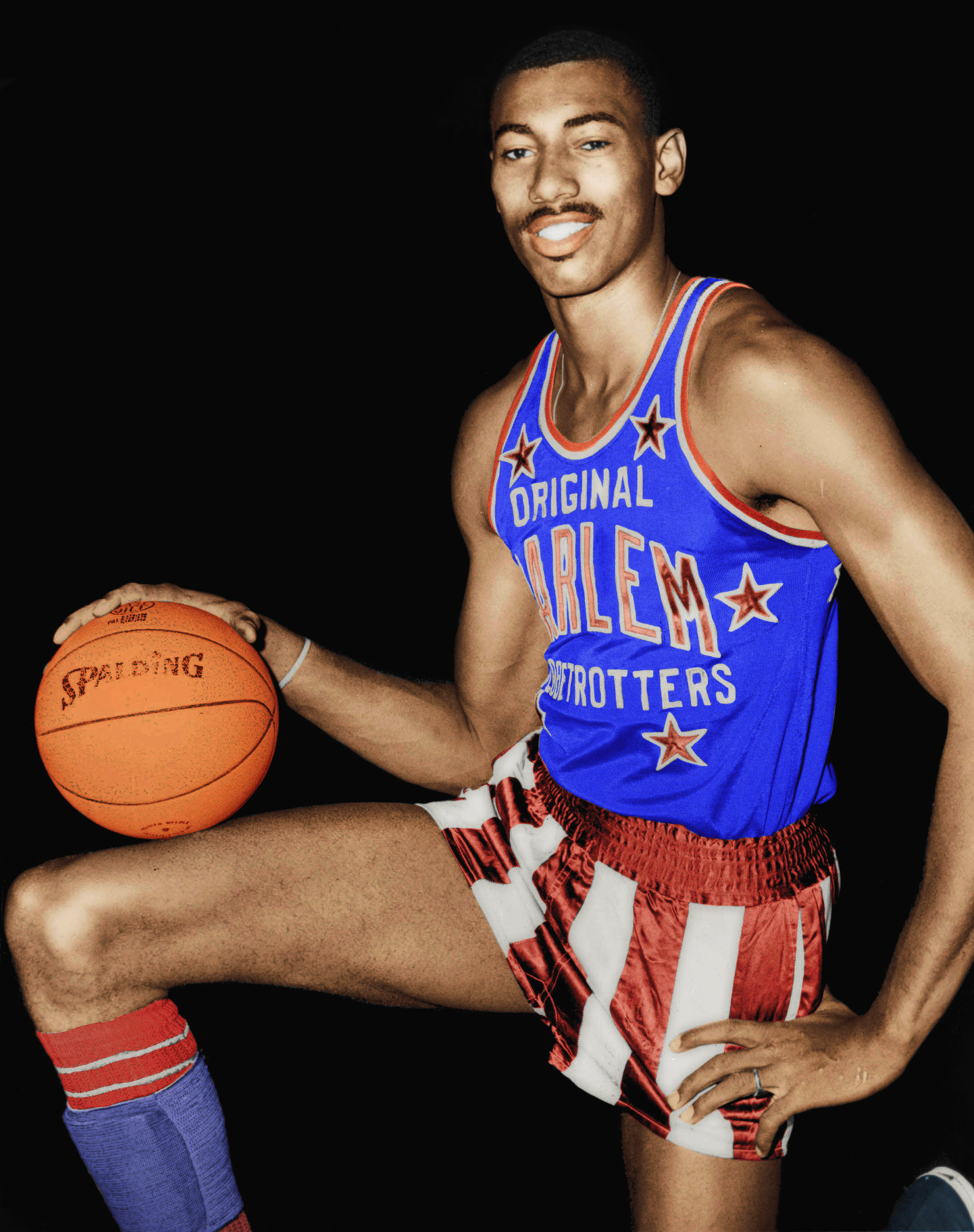
Wilt Chamberlain of Kansas

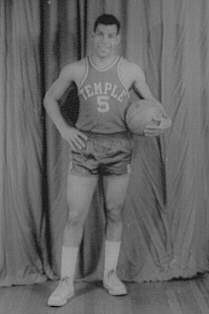
Guy Rodgers of Temple

Consensus First Team
Player	Position	Class	Team
Wilt Chamberlain	C	Sophomore	Kansas
Chet Forte	G	Senior	Columbia
Rod Hundley	G/F	Senior	West Virginia
Jim Krebs	F/C	Senior	SMU
Lennie Rosenbluth	F	Senior	North Carolina
Charlie Tyra	C	Senior	Louisville

Consensus Second Team
Player	Position	Class	Team
Elgin Baylor	F	Sophomore	Seattle
Frank Howard	F	Junior	Ohio State
Guy Rodgers	G	Junior	Temple
Gary Thompson	G	Senior	Iowa State
Grady Wallace	F	Senior	South Carolina

=== Major player of the year awards ===
- Helms Foundation Player of the Year: Lennie Rosenbluth, North Carolina
- UPI Player of the Year: Chet Forte, Columbia

=== Major coach of the year awards ===
- UPI Coach of the Year: Frank McGuire, North Carolina

=== Other major awards ===
- Robert V. Geasey Trophy (Top player in Philadelphia Big 5): Guy Rodgers, Temple
- NIT/Haggerty Award (Top player in NYC): Chet Forte, Columbia

== Coaching changes ==
A number of teams changed coaches during the season and after it ended.

Team	Former Coach	Interim Coach	New Coach	Reason
Arizona State	Bill Kajikawa		Ned Wulk	
Kent State	David E. McDowell		Bill Bertka	
Loyola (LA)	Jim McCafferty		Jim Harding	
LSU	Harry Rabenhorst		Jay McCreary	
Miami (OH)	Bill Rohr		Dick Shrider	
Rhode Island	Jack Guy		Ernie Calverley	
Texas A&M	Ken Loeffler		Bob Rogers	
Virginia	Evan Male		Billy McCann	
Wake Forest	Murray Greason		Bones McKinney	
Washington & Lee	Billy McCann		Weenie Miller	
West Texas A&M	Gus Miller		Borden Price	
Xavier	Ned Wulk		Jim McCafferty	Wulk has left to coach Arizona State.
