= 1956–57 Ohio Bobcats men's basketball team =

American college basketball season

1956–57 Ohio Bobcats men's basketball
- Conference: Mid-American Conference
- Record: 15–8 (7–5 MAC)
- Head coach: Jim Snyder (8th season)
- Home arena: Men's Gymnasium

1956–57 Mid-American Conference men's basketball standings
	Conf.				Overall
Team	W		L	PCT	W		L	PCT
Miami (Ohio)	11	–	1	.917	17	–	8	.680
Marshall	8	–	4	.667	15	–	9	.625
Ohio	7	–	5	.583	15	–	8	.652
Bowling Green	7	–	5	.583	14	–	9	.609
Western Michigan	4	–	8	.333	8	–	13	.381
Toledo	3	–	9	.250	5	–	19	.208
Kent State	2	–	10	.167	5	–	18	.217
Rankings from AP Poll

The 1956–57 Ohio Bobcats men's basketball team represented Ohio University as a member of the Mid-American Conference in the college basketball season of 1956–57. The team was coached by Jim Snyder and played their home games at the Men's Gymnasium. The Bobcats finished the regular season with a record of 15–8 and finished third in the MAC regular season with a conference record of 7–5.

== Schedule ==
Date time, TV	Rank^{#}	Opponent^{#}	Result	Record	Site (attendance) city, state
Regular Season
12/4/1956*		Marietta	W 107–67	1–0	
12/8/1956*		Case Tech	W 76–56	2–0	
12/12/1956*		at Ohio Wesleyan	W 113–71	3–0	
12/15/1956		at Kent State	W 97–89	4–0 (1–0)	
12/21/1956*		vs. East Tennessee State; Watauga Invitational	L 62–63	4–1	
12/22/1956*		vs. Austin Peay; Watauga Invitational	W 85–65	5–1	
1/2/1957*		Arizona State	W 97–81	6–1	
1/5/1957*		at Morehead State	L 88–119	6–2	
MAC regular season
1/9/1957		at Marshall	L 71–77	6–3 (1–1)	
1/12/1957		at Bowling Green	L 69–80	6–4 (1–2)	
1/15/1957		Miami (OH)	L 77–89	6–5 (1–3)	
1/18/1957		Kent State	W 85–76	7–5 (2–3)	
1/19/1957*		at Xavier	L 80–106	7–6	
1/26/1957*		Morehead State	W 66–59	8–6	
1/30/1957		Marshall	W 103–74	9–6 (3–3)	
2/2/1957		at Western Michigan	L 88–94	9–7 (3–4)	
2/4/1957		at Toledo	L 71–74	9–8 (3–5)	
2/8/1957		Bowling Green	W 91–80	10–8 (4–5)	
2/11/1957		at Miami (OH)	W 89–81	11–8 (5–5)	
2/16/1957		Western Michigan	W 88–71	6–5	
2/18/1957		Toledo	W 75–55	13–8 (7–5)	
2/23/1957*		Baldwin-Wallace	W 114–73	14–8	
3/1/1957		Marietta	W 112–85	15–8	
*Non-conference game. ^{#}Rankings from AP Poll. (#) Tournament seedings in parentheses. All times are in Eastern Time.

== Statistics ==
=== Team statistics ===
Final 1956–57 statistics

Record	Ohio	OPP
Scoring	2004	1785
Scoring Average	87.13	77.61
Field goals – Att	757–1781	664–1763
Free throws – Att	490–732	457–708
Rebounds	1253	1126
Assists		
Turnovers		
Steals		
Blocked Shots		

=== Player statistics ===
			Minutes		Scoring		Total FGs			Free-Throws			Rebounds						
Player	GP	GS	Tot	Avg	Pts	Avg	FG	FGA	Pct	FT	FTA	Pct	Tot	Avg	A	PF	TO	Stl	Blk
Fred Moore	23	-			453	19.7	193	432	0.447	67	97	0.691	240	10.4		54			
Don Sifft	23	-			347	15.1	144	335	0.430	59	83	0.711	108	4.7		47			
Dave Scott	23	-			306	13.3	117	271	0.432	72	113	0.637	298	13.0		65			
Bob Anderson	23	-			267	11.6	84	180	0.467	99	131	0.756	88	3.8		61			
Dick Norman	22	-			163	7.4	55	123	0.447	53	72	0.736	58	2.6		36			
_ Williams	21	-			126	6.0	36			54									
Bob Peters	9	-			80	8.9	32			16									
_ Pell	20	-			76	3.8	25			26									
_ Edwards	21	-			66	3.1	25			16									
John Tudor	16	-			46	2.9	15			16									
Jerry Wolf	16	-			45	2.8	19			7									
Russ Grooms	19	-			27	1.4	11			5									
Total	23	-	-	-	2004	87.1	757	1781	0.425	490	732	0.669	1253	54.5		429			
Opponents	23	-	-	-	1785	77.6	664	1763	0.377	457	708	0.645	1126	49.0		434			

Legend
GP	Games played	GS	Games started	Avg	Average per game
FG	Field-goals made	FGA	Field-goal attempts	Off	Offensive rebounds
Def	Defensive rebounds	A	Assists	TO	Turnovers
Blk	Blocks	Stl	Steals	High	Team high
