= Roland, Iowa =

- City
- Motto: "Honoring The Past, Embracing The Future"
- Location of Roland, Iowa
- Coordinates: 42°09′58″N 93°29′58″W
- Country: United States
- State: Iowa
- County: Story

Government
  - Type: Mayor–council government
  - Governing body: Roland City Council

Area
  - Total: 1.15 sq mi (2.97 km^{2})
  - Land: 1.15 sq mi (2.97 km^{2})
  - Water: 0 sq mi (0.00 km^{2})
- Elevation: 1,027 ft (313 m)

Population (2020)
  - Total: 1,362
  - Density: 1,189.1/sq mi (459.11/km^{2})
- Time zone: UTC-6 (Central (CST))
  - Summer (DST): UTC-5 (CDT)
- ZIP code: 50236
- Area code: 515
- FIPS code: 19-68475
- GNIS feature ID: 2396417
- Website: City of Roland website

Roland is a city in Story County, Iowa, United States. The population was 1,362 at the time of the 2020 census. It is part of the Ames, Iowa Metropolitan Statistical Area, which is a part of the larger Ames-Boone, Iowa Combined Statistical Area.

== History ==
The city was incorporated December 29, 1891.

== Geography ==
According to the United States Census Bureau, the city has a total area of 1.08 square miles (2.80 km^{2}), all land.

== Demographics ==
Historical populations
Year	Pop.	±%
1900	557	—
1910	641	+15.1%
1920	829	+29.3%
1930	759	−8.4%
1940	791	+4.2%
1950	687	−13.1%
1960	748	+8.9%
1970	803	+7.4%
1980	1,005	+25.2%
1990	1,035	+3.0%
2000	1,324	+27.9%
2010	1,284	−3.0%
2020	1,362	+6.1%
Source:"U.S. Census website". United States Census Bureau. and Iowa Data Center; Source: U.S. Decennial Census

=== 2020 census ===
As of the 2020 census, Roland had a population of 1,362 people, with 522 households and 364 families residing in the city. The median age was 36.8 years. 28.7% of residents were under the age of 18, 30.8% were under the age of 20, and 12.3% were 65 years of age or older. 3.5% were between the ages of 20 and 24, 27.3% were from 25 to 44, and 26.1% were from 45 to 64. For every 100 females there were 96.8 males, and for every 100 females age 18 and over there were 97.4 males age 18 and over.

0.0% of residents lived in urban areas, while 100.0% lived in rural areas.

Of the 522 households, 37.2% had children under the age of 18 living with them. Of all households, 60.3% were married-couple households, 5.7% were cohabiting-couple households, 15.9% were households with a male householder and no spouse or partner present, and 18.0% were households with a female householder and no spouse or partner present. About 30.3% of households were non-families, 26.0% were made up of individuals, and 10.7% had someone living alone who was 65 years of age or older.

There were 552 housing units, of which 5.4% were vacant. The homeowner vacancy rate was 0.7% and the rental vacancy rate was 9.2%. The population density was 1,189.1 inhabitants per square mile (459.1/km^{2}), and there were 481.9 housing units per square mile (186.1/km^{2}).

Racial composition as of the 2020 census
Race	Number	Percent
White	1,286	94.4%
Black or African American	4	0.3%
American Indian and Alaska Native	4	0.3%
Asian	4	0.3%
Native Hawaiian and Other Pacific Islander	1	0.1%
Some other race	16	1.2%
Two or more races	47	3.5%
Hispanic or Latino (of any race)	33	2.4%

=== 2010 census ===
As of the census of 2010, there were 1,284 people, 503 households, and 354 families living in the city. The population density was 1,188.9 inhabitants per square mile (459.0/km^{2}). There were 534 housing units at an average density of 494.4 per square mile (190.9/km^{2}). The racial makeup of the city was 98.4% White, 0.2% African American, 0.3% Native American, 0.1% Asian, 0.2% from other races, and 0.8% from two or more races. Hispanic or Latino of any race were 1.0% of the population.

There were 503 households, of which 39.0% had children under the age of 18 living with them, 61.2% were married couples living together, 6.8% had a female householder with no husband present, 2.4% had a male householder with no wife present, and 29.6% were non-families. 26.2% of all households were made up of individuals, and 9.6% had someone living alone who was 65 years of age or older. The average household size was 2.55 and the average family size was 3.10.

The median age in the city was 35.9 years. 28.5% of residents were under the age of 18; 6.2% were between the ages of 18 and 24; 29.4% were from 25 to 44; 25.9% were from 45 to 64; and 10% were 65 years of age or older. The gender makeup of the city was 49.0% male and 51.0% female.

=== 2000 census ===
As of the census of 2000, there were 1,324 people, 485 households, and 366 families living in the city. The population density was 1,223.0 inhabitants per square mile (472.2/km^{2}). There were 509 housing units at an average density of 470.2 per square mile (181.5/km^{2}). The racial makeup of the city was 99.02% White, 0.08% Native American, 0.23% Asian, 0.08% from other races, and 0.60% from two or more races. Hispanic or Latino of any race were 0.68% of the population.

There were 485 households, out of which 41.9% had children under the age of 18 living with them, 66.6% were married couples living together, 6.8% had a female householder with no husband present, and 24.5% were non-families. 22.1% of all households were made up of individuals, and 10.7% had someone living alone who was 65 years of age or older. The average household size was 2.73 and the average family size was 3.22.

32.4% are under the age of 18, 5.1% from 18 to 24, 30.9% from 25 to 44, 20.5% from 45 to 64, and 11.1% who were 65 years of age or older. The median age was 34 years. For every 100 females, there were 95.6 males. For every 100 females age 18 and over, there were 96.3 males.

The median income for a household in the city was $47,461, and the median income for a family was $55,417. Males had a median income of $34,118 versus $27,045 for females. The per capita income for the city was $18,165. About 4.1% of families and 4.3% of the population were below the poverty line, including 5.7% of those under age 18 and 5.9% of those age 65 or over.

== Government ==
Roland has a mayor-council form of government, with a mayor elected to a two-year term and five city council members elected to 4-year terms.

In November 2005, the citizens of Roland elected Sam Juhl (I) the mayor of the city; Juhl was 18 years old and a high school student at the time of his election, and was sworn into office in January 2006. Juhl was elected to a second term and did not seek a third.

The mayor as of 2024 is Kurtis Bower whose term expires on December 31, 2025.

== Education ==
The Roland–Story Community School District operates public schools. The district was established on July 1, 1969, with the merger of the Roland and Story City school districts.

== Notable people ==
- Gary Thompson, basketball player and color commentator
