= 1956–57 Kentucky Wildcats men's basketball team =

1956–57 season of University of Kentucky men's basketball team

1956–57 Kentucky Wildcats men's basketball

SEC champions

NCAA tournament, Elite Eight
- Conference: Southeast Conference

Ranking
- Coaches: No. 3
- AP: No. 3
- Record: 23–5 (12–2 SEC)
- Head coach: Adolph Rupp (26th season)
- Assistant coach: Harry Lancaster
- Captain: Ed Beck
- Home arena: Memorial Coliseum

1956–57 Southeastern Conference men's basketball standings
| | Conf. | | | | Overall |
| Team | W | | L | PCT | W | | L | PCT |
|---|---|---|---|---|---|---|---|---|
| No. 3 Kentucky | 12 | – | 2 | .857 | 23 | – | 5 | .821 |
| No. 8 Vanderbilt | 11 | – | 4 | .733 | 17 | – | 5 | .773 |
| Georgia Tech | 12 | – | 5 | .706 | 18 | – | 8 | .692 |
| No. 15 Mississippi State | 9 | – | 5 | .643 | 17 | – | 8 | .680 |
| Tulane | 9 | – | 5 | .643 | 15 | – | 9 | .625 |
| Auburn | 8 | – | 7 | .533 | 13 | – | 8 | .619 |
| Alabama | 7 | – | 7 | .500 | 15 | – | 11 | .577 |
| Florida | 6 | – | 8 | .429 | 14 | – | 10 | .583 |
| Tennessee | 5 | – | 9 | .357 | 13 | – | 9 | .591 |
| Ole Miss | 4 | – | 11 | .267 | 9 | – | 12 | .429 |
| Georgia | 4 | – | 12 | .250 | 8 | – | 16 | .333 |
| LSU | 1 | – | 13 | .071 | 6 | – | 19 | .240 |
Rankings from AP Poll

The 1956–57 Kentucky Wildcats men's basketball team represented University of Kentucky. The head coach was Adolph Rupp. The team was a member of the Southeast Conference and played their home games at Memorial Coliseum. This squad, led by a core of juniors, was often nicknamed the "Fiddlin' Five".

== Roster ==
1956–57 Kentucky Wildcats men's basketball team
Players
Coaches

| Pos. | # | Name | Height | Weight | Year | Previous school | Hometown |
|---|---|---|---|---|---|---|---|
| G | 40 | Earl Adkins | 6 ft 4 in (1.93 m) | 180 lb (82 kg) | Jr | — | Ashland, KY |
| F | 50 | Jay Bayless | 6 ft 4 in (1.93 m) | 205 lb (93 kg) | Jr | — | Knoxville, TN |
| C | 34 | Ed Beck (C) | 6 ft 7 in (2.01 m) | 188 lb (85 kg) | Jr | — | Fort Valley, GA |
| G | 70 | John Brewer | 6 ft 3 in (1.91 m) | 180 lb (82 kg) | Sr | — | Louisville, KY |
| G | 10 | Gerry Calvert (C) | 5 ft 11 in (1.8 m) | 160 lb (73 kg) | Sr | — | Maysville, KY |
| G/F | 12 | Billy Ray Cassady | 6 ft 2 in (1.88 m) | 191 lb (87 kg) | Jr | — | Inez, KY |
| G | 10 | Lincoln Collinsworth | 6 ft 3 in (1.91 m) | 185 lb (84 kg) | Jr | — | Salyersville, KY |
| F | 24 | Johnny Cox | 6 ft 4 in (1.93 m) | 185 lb (84 kg) | So | Hazard | Hazard, KY |
| F | 32 | John Crigler | 6 ft 3 in (1.91 m) | 180 lb (82 kg) | Jr | Hebron | Hebron, KY |
| G | 66 | John Hardwick | 6 ft 3 in (1.91 m) | 185 lb (84 kg) | So | — | Lexington, KY |
| G | 52 | Vernon Hatton | 6 ft 3 in (1.91 m) | 195 lb (88 kg) | Jr | Lafayette | Lexington, KY |
| F/C | 20 | Dick Howe | 6 ft 5 in (1.96 m) | 210 lb (95 kg) | So | — | Carbondale, IL |
| F/C | 14 | Phil Johnson | 6 ft 5 in (1.96 m) | 190 lb (86 kg) | So | University | Lexington, KY |
| F | 55 | Ray Mills | 6 ft 4 in (1.93 m) | 200 lb (91 kg) | Sr | — | Manchester, KY |
| G/F | 33 | Harold Ross | 6 ft 3 in (1.91 m) | 175 lb (79 kg) | Jr | — | Hickman, KY |
| G | 50 | Adrian Smith | 6 ft 0 in (1.83 m) | 178 lb (81 kg) | Jr | — | Farmington, KY |
| F | 88 | Bill Smith | 6 ft 5 in (1.96 m) | 200 lb (91 kg) | Jr | — | Walton, KY |

Head coach

- Adolph Rupp

Assistant coach(es)

- Harry Lancaster

Legend

- (C) Team captain
- (S) Suspended
- (I) Ineligible
- (W) Walk-on
- Injured
- Current redshirt

Roster
Last update: January 20, 2024

== Schedule and results ==
| Date time, TV | Rank^{#} | Opponent^{#} | Result | Record | Site (attendance) city, state |
Regular Season
| Dec 1, 1956* | | Washington & Lee | W 94–66 | 1–0 | Memorial Coliseum; Lexington, Kentucky |
| Dec 3, 1956* | | Miami (FL) | W 114–75 | 2–0 | Memorial Coliseum; Lexington, Kentucky |
| Dec 8, 1956* | | at Temple | W 73–58 | 3–0 | The Palestra; Philadelphia, Pennsylvania |
| Dec 10, 1956* | No. 3 | Saint Louis | L 70–71 | 3–1 | Memorial Coliseum; Lexington, Kentucky |
| Dec 15, 1956* | No. 3 | Maryland | W 76–55 | 4–1 | Memorial Coliseum; Lexington, Kentucky |
| Dec 18, 1956* | No. 7 | at No. 13 Duke | L 84–85 | 4–2 | Cameron Indoor Stadium; Durham, North Carolina |
| Dec 21, 1956* | No. 7 | No. 4 Southern Methodist; UK Invitation Tournament | W 73–67 | 5–2 | Memorial Coliseum (9,500); Lexington, Kentucky |
| Dec 22, 1956* | No. 7 | No. 5 Illinois; UK Invitation Tournament | W 91–70 | 6–2 | Memorial Coliseum (9,500); Lexington, Kentucky |
| Dec 28, 1956* | No. 3 | vs. Virginia Tech; Sugar Bowl Tournament | W 56–55 | 7–2 | The Field House (3,800); New Orleans, Louisiana |
| Dec 29, 1956* | No. 3 | vs. Houston; Sugar Bowl Tournament | W 111–76 | 8–2 | The Field House (3,500); New Orleans, Louisiana |
| Jan 5, 1957 | No. 3 | Georgia Tech | W 95–72 | 9–2 (1–0) | Memorial Coliseum; Lexington, Kentucky |
| Jan 7, 1957* | No. 3 | Loyola–Chicago | W 81–62 | 10–2 | Memorial Coliseum; Lexington, Kentucky |
| Jan 12, 1957 | No. 3 | at Louisiana State | W 51–46 | 11–2 (2–0) | John M. Parker Agricultural Coliseum; Baton Rouge, Louisiana |
| Jan 14, 1957 | No. 4 | at Tulane | L 60–68 | 11–3 (2–1) | Avron B. Fogelman Arena; New Orleans, Louisiana |
| Jan 19, 1957 | No. 4 | at Tennessee | W 97–72 | 12–3 (3–1) | Alumni Memorial Gymnasium; Knoxville, Tennessee |
| Jan 26, 1957 | No. 5 | at No. 13 Vanderbilt | W 91–83 | 13–3 (4–1) | Memorial Gymnasium; Nashville, Tennessee |
| Jan 28, 1957 | No. 4 | at Georgia Tech | W 76–65 | 14–3 (5–1) | Alexander Memorial Coliseum; Atlanta, Georgia |
| Jan 30, 1957 | No. 4 | Georgia | W 84–53 | 15–3 (6–1) | Memorial Coliseum; Lexington, Kentucky |
| Feb 2, 1957 | No. 4 | Florida | W 88–61 | 16–3 (7–1) | Memorial Coliseum; Lexington, Kentucky |
| Feb 8, 1957 | No. 3 | vs. Ole Miss | W 75–69 | 17–3 (8–1) | Ellis Auditorium; Memphis, Tennessee |
| Feb 11, 1957 | No. 3 | at Mississippi State | L 81–89 | 17–4 (8–2) | McCarthy Gymnasium; Starkville, Mississippi |
| Feb 15, 1957* | No. 3 | at Loyola–Chicago | W 115–65 | 18–4 | Chicago Stadium; Chicago, Illinois |
| Feb 18, 1957 | No. 3 | No. 10 Vanderbilt | W 80–78 | 19–4 (9–2) | Memorial Coliseum; Lexington, Kentucky |
| Feb 23, 1957 | No. 3 | Alabama | W 79–60 | 20–4 (10–2) | Memorial Coliseum; Lexington, Kentucky |
| Feb 25, 1957 | No. 3 | Auburn | W 103–85 | 21–4 (11–2) | Memorial Coliseum; Lexington, Kentucky |
| Mar 2, 1957 | No. 3 | Tennessee | W 93–75 | 22–4 (12–2) | Memorial Coliseum; Lexington, Kentucky |
NCAA Tournament
| Mar 15, 1957* | No. 3 | vs. Pittsburgh; Mideast Regional Semifinal – Sweet Sixteen | W 98–92 | 23–4 | Memorial Coliseum; Lexington, Kentucky |
| Mar 16, 1957* | No. 3 | vs. No. 11 Michigan State; Mideast Regional Final – Elite Eight | L 68–80 | 23–5 | Memorial Coliseum; Lexington, Kentucky |
*Non-conference game. ^{#}Rankings from AP Poll. (#) Tournament seedings in parentheses. ME=Mideast.

== Rankings ==
Ranking movements Legend: ██ Increase in ranking ██ Decrease in ranking
| | Week | | | | | | | | | | | | | | |
| Poll | Pre | 1 | 2 | 3 | 4 | 5 | 6 | 7 | 8 | 9 | 10 | 11 | 12 | 13 | Final |
|---|---|---|---|---|---|---|---|---|---|---|---|---|---|---|---|
| AP | Not released | 3 | 7 | 3 | 3 | 3 | 4 | 5 | 4 | 3 | 3 | 3 | 3 | 3 | 3 |
| UP | 14 | 7 | 7 | 3 | 3 | 3 | 3 | 3 | 3 | 3 | 3 | 3 | 3 | 3 | 3 |
