= 1956–57 Kansas Jayhawks men's basketball team =

American college basketball season

1956–57 Kansas Jayhawks men's basketball

Big Seven Champions NCAA tournament, runner-up

National Championship Game, L 53–54 ^{3OT} vs. North Carolina
- Conference: Big Seven Conference

Ranking
- Coaches: No. 2
- AP: No. 2
- Record: 24–3 (11–1 Big Seven)
- Head coach: Dick Harp (1st season)
- Assistant coaches: Jack Eskridge (3rd season); Jerry Waugh (1st season)
- Captains: Gene Elstun; John Parker
- Home arena: Allen Fieldhouse

1956–57 Big Seven Conference men's basketball standings
	Conf.				Overall
Team	W		L	PCT	W		L	PCT
No. 2 Kansas	11	–	1	.917	24	–	3	.889
Kansas State	8	–	4	.667	15	–	8	.652
Iowa State	6	–	6	.500	16	–	7	.696
Colorado	5	–	7	.417	14	–	9	.609
Nebraska	5	–	7	.417	11	–	12	.478
Missouri	4	–	8	.333	10	–	13	.435
Oklahoma	3	–	9	.250	8	–	15	.348
Rankings from AP Poll

The 1956–57 Kansas Jayhawks men's basketball team was a Division I college basketball team that represented the University of Kansas. Coached by Dick Harp, the Jayhawks posted a 24–3 win–loss record, winning the then-Big Seven Conference and qualifying for the 1957 NCAA Division I men's basketball tournament. Kansas won three games in the NCAA tournament to reach the championship game, where the Jayhawks lost to North Carolina in triple overtime.

== Season summary ==
Dick Harp was named the head coach of the Jayhawks before the 1956–57 season. The previous coach, Phog Allen, had been forced to leave the program due to an enforced retirement age in place at the school. The 1956–57 Jayhawks featured future National Basketball Association center Wilt Chamberlain, in his first season with the varsity program. Expectations for the team were high entering the season; Allen said of the Jayhawks' new player that "Anybody could win the national championship with Wilt Chamberlain and four cheerleaders." Chamberlain averaged 29.6 points and 18.8 rebounds per game over the course of the season. In Kansas' opening game against Northwestern, he scored 52 points and compiled 31 rebounds in an 87–69 win. The Jayhawks won their next five games by at least 10 points each, and began the season with 12 consecutive victories. Following that streak, Iowa State defeated Kansas 39–37. Kansas lost one other game in the regular season, on February 20, 1957, against Oklahoma by a score of 56–54. The Jayhawks wrapped up the Big Seven title, and an NCAA Tournament berth, with a 64–57 win over Kansas State on March 7. They ended the regular season with a record of 20–2, and a Big Seven record of 11–1.

In the first round of the NCAA tournament, Kansas faced SMU and was forced into an overtime period. Behind 36 points by Chamberlain, the Jayhawks won 73–65 to advance to the regional finals. There, the Jayhawks defeated Oklahoma City 81–61 to reach the Final Four. Chamberlain scored 30 points in the game, adding 15 rebounds. The two-time defending NCAA Tournament champions, San Francisco, faced Kansas in the Final Four's host site, Kansas City. With a field goal percentage of almost 60 percent, the Jayhawks posted an 80–56 win to advance to the championship game against undefeated North Carolina, the number one-ranked team in the country. The Tar Heels defeated the Jayhawks 54–53 in triple overtime; North Carolina's Joe Quigg made the tying and go-ahead free throws in the final seconds.

== Roster ==
- Bob Billings
- Wilt Chamberlain
- John Cleland
- Eddie Dater
- Gene Elstun
- Joe Ensley
- Lee Green
- Blaine Hollinger
- Harry Jett
- Lew Johnson
- Monte Johnson
- Ron Johnston
- Larry Kelley
- Lyn Kindred
- Maurice King
- Ron Loneski
- John Parker
- Gary Thompson

Roster and schedule source:

== Schedule and results ==
Date time, TV	Rank^{#}	Opponent^{#}	Result	Record	Site city, state
December 3*		Northwestern	W 87–69	1–0	Allen Fieldhouse; Lawrence, KS
December 8*		Marquette	W 78–61	2–0	Allen Fieldhouse; Lawrence, KS
December 14*	No. 1	at Washington	W 77–63	3–0	Bank of America Arena; Seattle, WA
December 15*	No. 1	at Washington	W 92–78	4–0	Bank of America Arena; Seattle, WA
December 18*	No. 1	at California	W 66–56	5–0	Harmon Gym; Berkeley, CA
December 22*	No. 1	Wisconsin	W 83–62	6–0	Allen Fieldhouse; Lawrence, KS
December 26	No. 1	vs. No. 14 Iowa State	W 58–57	7–0	Municipal Auditorium; Kansas City, MO
December 28	No. 1	vs. Oklahoma	W 74–56	8–0	Municipal Auditorium; Kansas City, MO
December 29	No. 1	vs. Colorado	W 80–54	9–0	Municipal Auditorium; Kansas City, MO
January 5	No. 1	Missouri; Border War	W 92–79	10–0 (1–0)	Allen Fieldhouse; Lawrence, KS
January 7*	No. 1	at Oklahoma	W 59–51	11–0 (2–0)	Field House; Norman, OK
January 12	No. 1	Kansas State; Sunflower Showdown	W 51–45	12–0 (3–0)	Allen Fieldhouse; Lawrence, KS
January 14	No. 1	at No. 7 Iowa State	L 37–39	12–1 (3–1)	The Armory; Ames, IA
February 2	No. 2	No. 8 Iowa State	W 75–64	13–1 (4–1)	Allen Fieldhouse; Lawrence, KS
February 9	No. 2	Nebraska	W 69–54	14–1 (5–1)	Nebraska Coliseum; Lincoln, NE
February 12	No. 2	Oklahoma A&M	W 62–52	15–1	Allen Fieldhouse; Lawrence, KS
February 16	No. 2	at Missouri; Border War	W 91–58	16–1 (6–1)	Brewer Fieldhouse; Columbia, MO
February 18	No. 2	Oklahoma	W 76–56	17–1 (7–1)	Allen Fieldhouse; Lawrence, KS
February 21	No. 2	at Oklahoma A&M	L 54–56	17–2	Gallagher Hall; Stillwater, OK
February 23	No. 2	Nebraska	W 87–60	18–2 (8–1)	Allen Fieldhouse; Lawrence, KS
March 2	No. 2	at Colorado	W 68–57	19–2 (9–1)	Balch Fieldhouse; Boulder, CO
March 6	No. 2	at Kansas State; Sunflower Showdown	W 64–57	20–2 (10–1)	Ahearn Field House; Manhattan, KS
March 9	No. 2	Colorado	W 78–63	21–2 (11–1)	Allen Fieldhouse; Lawrence, KS
March 15*	No. 2	vs. No. 4 SMU; NCAA regional semifinals	W 73–65 ^{OT}	22–2	Moody Coliseum; University Park, TX
March 16*	No. 2	vs. No. 9 Oklahoma City; NCAA Regional Finals	W 81–61	23–2	Moody Coliseum; University Park, TX
March 22*	No. 2	vs. San Francisco; NCAA National semifinals	W 80–56	24–2	Municipal Auditorium; Kansas City, MO
March 23*	No. 2	vs. No. 1 North Carolina; National Championship game	L 53–54 ^{3OT}	24–3	Municipal Auditorium; Kansas City, MO
*Non-conference game. ^{#}Rankings from AP Poll. (#) Tournament seedings in parentheses.

== Rankings ==
From the beginning of the season, the Jayhawks topped the Associated Press Poll, holding their position until mid-January. After the Jayhawks' loss to Iowa State, the team fell to number two in the poll. Kansas stayed in that position for the rest of the season. In the United Press Poll, the Jayhawks held the top overall ranking at the start of the season and remained there until the January 22 rankings, when they fell to second behind North Carolina. They stayed in that position in each subsequent poll during the season.

== In popular culture ==
The team, specifically starting center Wilt Chamberlain and coach Phog Allen, where the focus of the 2014 film Jayhawkers, which was directed by University of Kansas film professor Kevin Willmott. The film featured former Jayhawk basketball player Scot Pollard and Justin Wesley, who was on the roster at the time of the release. Additionally, Kansas alumni Jay Karnes portrays Chancellor Franklin Murphy.
