= Gary Thompson (basketball player) =

American basketball player and broadcaster

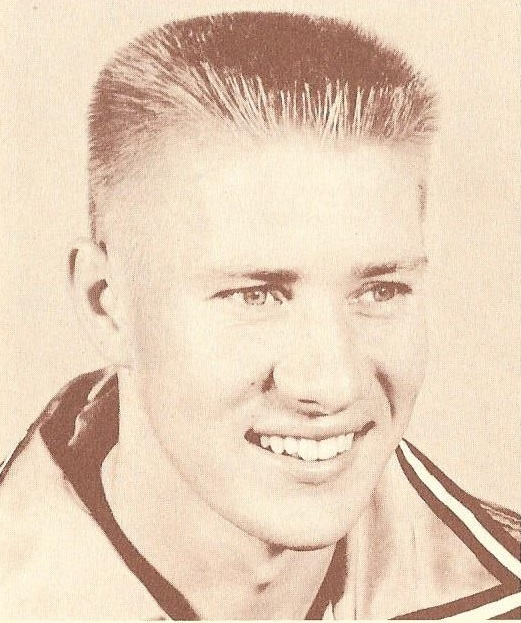
- Thompson with the Phillips 66ers

Personal information
- Born: Roland, Iowa, U.S.
- Listed height: 5 ft 10 in (1.78 m)
- Listed weight: 158 lb (72 kg)

Career information
- High school: Roland (Roland, Iowa)
- College: Iowa State (1954–1957)
- NBA draft: 1957: 5th round, 35th overall pick
- Drafted by: Minneapolis Lakers
- Position: Guard
- Number: 20

Career highlights
- 3× AAU All-American (1958, 1959, 1962); Consensus second-team All-American (1957); Big Seven Player of the Year (1957); 2× First-team All-Big Seven (1956, 1957); No. 20 retired by Iowa State Cyclones
- Stats at Basketball Reference
Medals
Representing United States
Basketball
Pan American Games
Gold medal – first place	1959 Chicago	Team Competition

Gary Thompson is a retired American basketball player and broadcaster. He was an All-American player at Iowa State. Following his collegiate career, Thompson played for the Phillips 66ers of the Amateur Athletic Union and had a successful career as a broadcaster.

== Playing career ==
Known as the "Roland Rocket", Gary Thompson came to Iowa State University from the small town of Roland, Iowa to become one of the Cyclones' first cage stars. A 5'10 guard, Thompson was the first Iowa State player to score more than 1,000 points and the first player in school history to tally 40 points in a game. As a senior in 1956–57, Thompson earned consensus second team All-American honors, first team All-America status from the Associated Press, and was named Big Seven Conference player of the year, beating out Kansas star Wilt Chamberlain. Thompson excelled in a second sport as well, leading Iowa State to the 1957 College World Series as an All-American shortstop.

Following the close of his standout college career, Thompson chose to join the Bartlesville Phillips 66ers of the Amateur Athletic Union, though he was also drafted in the fifth round of the 1957 NBA draft by the Minneapolis Lakers. Thompson had a successful career with the 66ers, earning AAU All-America honors three times and leading Phillips to an AAU title in 1962. He later coached the 66ers as well.

== Post-playing career ==
After his playing days were over, Thompson began the Gary Thompson Oil Company, a business venture made possible by his affiliation with the Phillips Petroleum Company. He also embarked on a 34-year television broadcasting career – serving as color commentator for college basketball games on NBC and CBS, primarily for Big Eight and later Big 12 games. He retired in 2006.
