= 1957 NCAA University Division basketball tournament =

Edition of USA college basketball tournament

- Season: 1956–57
- Teams: 23
- Finals site: Municipal Auditorium, Kansas City, Missouri
- Champions: North Carolina Tar Heels (1st title, 2nd title game, 2nd Final Four)
- Runner-up: Kansas Jayhawks (4th title game, 4th Final Four)
- Semifinalists: Michigan State Spartans (1st Final Four); San Francisco Dons (3rd Final Four)
- Winning coach: Frank McGuire (1st title)
- MOP: Wilt Chamberlain (Kansas)
- Attendance: 108,891
- Top scorer: Lennie Rosenbluth (North Carolina) (140 points)

The 1957 NCAA University Division basketball tournament was a single-elimination tournament involving 23 teams to determine the national champion of men's college basketball in the NCAA University Division, which was replaced in 1973 by NCAA Division I. The 1956–57 school year was the first in which NCAA members were formally divided into separate competitive levels, with larger and more competitive athletic programs placed in the University Division and smaller programs placed in the College Division (which would be replaced by NCAA Division II and NCAA Division III in 1973).

The 19th annual edition of the NCAA tournament began on March 11, 1957, and ended with the championship game on March 23, at the Municipal Auditorium in Kansas City, Missouri. A total of 27 games were played, including a third-place game in each region and a national third-place game. North Carolina, coached by Frank McGuire, won the national title with a 54–53 triple-overtime victory in the final game over Kansas, coached by Dick Harp. Wilt Chamberlain of Kansas became the fourth player to be named the tournament's Most Outstanding Player despite not playing for the championship team.

== Tournament notes ==
North Carolina won two consecutive triple overtime games to win the championship. The North Carolina – Michigan State semi final game and North Carolina – Kansas final game both made USA Today's list of the greatest NCAA tournament games of all time at 11 and 6 respectively.

== Locations ==
Round	Region	Site	Venue
First Round	East	New York, New York	Madison Square Garden
First Round	Mideast	Columbus, Ohio	St. John Arena
First Round	Midwest	Oklahoma City, Oklahoma	Capitol Hill High School Arena
First Round	West	Pocatello, Idaho	ISU Gymnasium
Regionals	East	Philadelphia, Pennsylvania	The Palestra
Regionals	Mideast	Lexington, Kentucky	Memorial Coliseum
Regionals	Midwest	Dallas, Texas	SMU Coliseum
Regionals	West	Corvallis, Oregon	Oregon State Coliseum
Final Four		Kansas City, Missouri	Municipal Auditorium

== Teams ==
Region	Team	Coach	Conference	Finished	Final Opponent	Score
East
East	Canisius	Joseph Curran	WNY3	Regional third place	Lafayette	W 82–76
East	Connecticut	Hugh Greer	Yankee	First round	Syracuse	L 82–76
East	Lafayette	George Davidson	Independent	Regional Fourth Place	Canisius	L 82–76
East	North Carolina	Frank McGuire	Atlantic Coast	Champion	Kansas	W 54–53
East	Syracuse	Marc Guley	Independent	Regional Runner-up	North Carolina	L 67–58
East	West Virginia	Fred Schaus	Southern	First round	Canisius	L 64–56
East	Yale	Joe Vancisin	Ivy League	First round	North Carolina	L 90–74
Mideast
Mideast	Kentucky	Adolph Rupp	Southeastern	Regional Runner-up	Michigan State	L 80–68
Mideast	Miami (OH)	Bill Rohr	Mid-American	First round	Notre Dame	L 89–77
Mideast	Michigan State	Forddy Anderson	Big Ten	Fourth Place	San Francisco	L 67–60
Mideast	Morehead State	Bobby Laughlin	Ohio Valley	First round	Pittsburgh	L 86–85
Mideast	Notre Dame	John Jordan	Independent	Regional third place	Pittsburgh	W 86–85
Mideast	Pittsburgh	Bob Timmons	Independent	Regional Fourth Place	Notre Dame	L 86–85
Midwest
Midwest	Kansas	Dick Harp	Big 7	Runner Up	North Carolina	L 54–53
Midwest	Loyola (LA)	Jim McCafferty	Independent	First round	Oklahoma City	L 76–55
Midwest	Oklahoma City	Abe Lemons	Independent	Regional Runner-up	Kansas	L 81–61
Midwest	SMU	Doc Hayes	Southwest	Regional third place	Saint Louis	W 78–68
Midwest	Saint Louis	Eddie Hickey	Missouri Valley	Regional Fourth Place	SMU	L 78–68
West
West	BYU	Stan Watts	Mountain States	Regional third place	Idaho State	W 65–54
West	California	Pete Newell	Pacific Coast	Regional Runner-up	San Francisco	L 50–46
West	Hardin–Simmons	Bill Scott	Border	First round	Idaho State	L 68–57
West	Idaho State	John Grayson	Independent	Regional Fourth Place	BYU	L 65–54
West	San Francisco	Phil Woolpert	West Coast Athletic	Third Place	Michigan State	W 67–60

== Bracket ==
* – Denotes overtime period

=== East region ===
Quarterfinals
Syracuse	82
Connecticut	76
Canisius	64
West Virginia	56
North Carolina	90
Yale	74

Semifinals
Lafayette	71
Syracuse	75
Canisius	75
North Carolina	87

Finals
Syracuse	58
North Carolina	67
Third place
Canisius	82
Lafayette	76

=== Mideast region ===
Quarterfinals
Pittsburgh	86
Morehead State	85
Notre Dame	89
Miami (OH)	77

Semifinals
Kentucky	98
Pittsburgh	92
Notre Dame	83
Michigan State	85

Finals
Kentucky	68
Michigan State	80
Third place
Notre Dame	86
Pittsburgh	85

=== Midwest region ===
Quarterfinals
Oklahoma City	76
Loyola (LA)	55

Semifinals
Saint Louis	66
Oklahoma City	75
Kansas	73
SMU	65*

Finals
Oklahoma City	61
Kansas	81
Third place
SMU	78
Saint Louis	68

=== West region ===
Quarterfinals
Idaho State	68
Hardin–Simmons	57

Semifinals
California	86
BYU	59
Idaho State	51
San Francisco	66

Finals
California	46
San Francisco	50
Third place
BYU	65
Idaho St.	54

=== Final Four ===
National Semifinals
E	North Carolina	74
ME	Michigan State	70***
MW	Kansas	80
W	San Francisco	56

National Championship Game
E	North Carolina	54
MW	Kansas	53***
National Third Place Game
W	San Francisco	67
ME	Michigan State	60

== See also ==
- 1957 NCAA College Division basketball tournament
- 1957 National Invitation Tournament
- 1957 NAIA basketball tournament
