= 1956–57 North Carolina Tar Heels men's basketball team =

American college basketball season

1956–57 North Carolina Tar Heels men's basketball
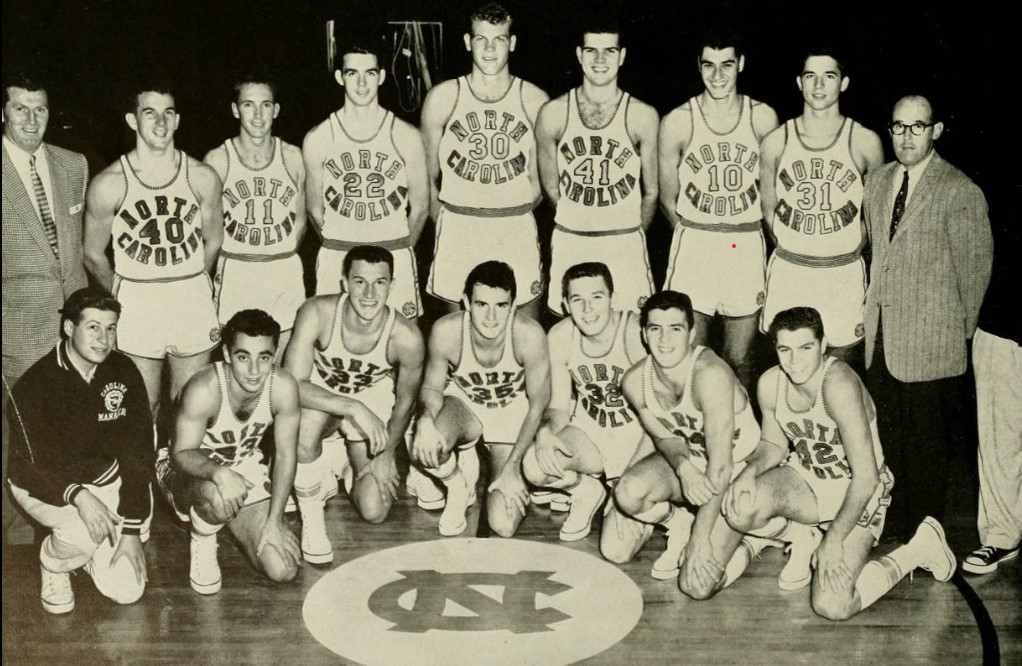

NCAA tournament National champions ACC tournament champions NCAA regular season champions ACC regular season champions

National Championship Game, W 54–53 ^{3OT} vs. Kansas
- Conference: Atlantic Coast Conference

Ranking
- Coaches: No. 1
- AP: No. 1
- Record: 32–0 (14–0 ACC)
- Head coach: Frank McGuire
- Assistant coach: Buck Freeman
- Home arena: Woollen Gymnasium

1956–57 ACC men's basketball standings
| | Conf. | | | | Overall |
| Team | W | | L | PCT | W | | L | PCT |
|---|---|---|---|---|---|---|---|---|
| No. 1 North Carolina† | 14 | – | 0 | 1.000 | 32 | – | 0 | 1.000 |
| Maryland | 9 | – | 5 | .643 | 16 | – | 10 | .615 |
| Duke | 8 | – | 6 | .571 | 13 | – | 11 | .542 |
| No. 18 Wake Forest | 7 | – | 7 | .500 | 19 | – | 9 | .679 |
| NC State | 7 | – | 7 | .500 | 15 | – | 11 | .577 |
| South Carolina | 5 | – | 9 | .357 | 17 | – | 12 | .586 |
| Virginia | 3 | – | 11 | .214 | 6 | – | 19 | .240 |
| Clemson | 3 | – | 11 | .214 | 7 | – | 17 | .292 |
† 1957 ACC tournament winner Rankings from AP Poll

The 1956–57 North Carolina Tar Heels men's basketball team was the varsity college basketball team that represented the University of North Carolina. (Note: The school was known as the University of North Carolina until February 1963.) The head coach was Frank McGuire. The team played its home games at Woollen Gymnasium in Chapel Hill, North Carolina, and was a member of the Atlantic Coast Conference. The team was the second undefeated national champion in NCAA basketball history and was the first ACC team to win a title. The team notably won its last two games in triple overtime. The Tar Heels leading scorer was player of the year, small forward Lennie Rosenbluth.

In the semifinal against Jumping Johnny Green and Michigan State, to tie the game in regulation, Pete Brennan, usually the power forward, after gathering the rebound, ran the floor like a guard and put in a jump shot with a soft touch. Three overtimes later, UNC won 74–70.

This placed undefeated North Carolina for the championship against Wilt Chamberlain and Kansas. Again the game went to triple overtime. Center Joe Quigg made the winning free throws.

== Roster ==
1956–57 North Carolina Tar Heels roster
| No. | Name | Position | Height | Weight | Class | Hometown |
|---|---|---|---|---|---|---|
| 10 | Lennie Rosenbluth | F | 6–5 | 180 | Senior | Bronx, New York |
| 11 | Ken Rosemond | G | 5–10 | 155 | Junior | Hillsborough, North Carolina |
| 20 | Bob Young | C | 6–6 | 220 | Senior | Queens, New York |
| 22 | Roy Searcy | F | 6–4 | 185 | Junior | Draper, North Carolina |
| 31 | Gehrmann Holland | F | 6–3 | 200 | Sophomore | Beaufort, North Carolina |
| 32 | Bob Cunningham | G | 6–4 | 190 | Junior | New York City, New York |
| 33 | Danny Lotz | F | 6–7 | 198 | Sophomore | Northport, New York |
| 35 | Pete Brennan | F | 6–6 | 190 | Junior | Brooklyn, New York |
| 40 | Tommy Kearns | G | 5–11 | 191 | Junior | Bergenfield, New Jersey |
| 41 | Joe Quigg | C | 6–9 | 210 | Junior | Brooklyn, New York |

== Schedule ==
Schedule
| Date time, TV | Opponent | Result | Record | Site city, state |
Regular season
| 1956/12/04* | Furman | W 94–66 | 1–0 | Woollen Gymnasium; Chapel Hill, NC |
| 1956/12/08 | vs. Clemson | W 94–75 | 2–0 | Charlotte, NC |
| 1956/12/12* | vs. George Washington | W 82–55 | 3–0 | Norfolk, VA |
| 1956/12/15 | at South Carolina | W 90–86^{OT} | 4–0 | Carolina Fieldhouse; Columbia, SC |
| 1956/12/17 | Maryland | W 70–61 | 5–0 | Woollen Gymnasium; Chapel Hill, NC |
| 1956/12/20* | vs. NYU | W 64–59 | 6–0 | Madison Square Garden; New York City |
| 1956/12/21* | vs. Dartmouth | W 89–61 | 7–0 | Boston Garden; Boston |
| 1956/12/22* | vs. Holy Cross | W 83–70 | 8–0 | Boston Garden; Boston |
| 1956/12/27* | vs. Utah; Dixie Classic | W 97–76 | 9–0 | Reynolds Coliseum; Raleigh, NC |
| 1956/12/28* | vs. Duke; Dixie Classic | W 87–71 | 10–0 | Reynolds Coliseum; Raleigh, NC |
| 1956/12/29* | vs. Wake Forest; Dixie Classic | W 63–55 | 11–0 | Reynolds Coliseum; Raleigh, NC |
| 1957/01/08* | at William & Mary | W 71–61 | 12–0 | Blow Gymnasium; Williamsburg, VA |
| 1957/01/11 | Clemson | W 86–54 | 13–0 | Woollen Gymnasium; Chapel Hill, NC |
| 1957/01/12 | Virginia | W 102–90 | 14–0 | Woollen Gymnasium; Chapel Hill, NC |
| 1957/01/15 | at NC State | W 83–57 | 15–0 | Reynolds Coliseum; Raleigh, NC |
| 1957/01/30* | at Western Carolina | W 77–59 | 16–0 | Breese Gymnasium; Cullowhee, NC |
| 1957/02/05 | at Maryland | W 65–61^{2OT} | 17–0 | Cole Field House; College Park, MD |
| 1957/02/09 | Duke | W 75–73 | 18–0 | Woollen Gymnasium; Chapel Hill, NC |
| 1957/02/11 | at Virginia | W 68–59 | 19–0 | Memorial Gymnasium; Charlottesville, VA |
| 1957/02/13 | Wake Forest | W 72–69 | 20–0 | Woollen Gymnasium; Chapel Hill, NC |
| 1957/02/19 | NC State | W 86–57 | 21–0 | Woollen Gymnasium; Chapel Hill, NC |
| 1957/02/22 | South Carolina | W 75–62 | 22–0 | Woollen Gymnasium; Chapel Hill, NC |
| 1957/02/26 | at Wake Forest | W 69–64 | 23–0 | Memorial Coliseum; Winston-Salem, NC |
| 1957/03/01 | at Duke | W 86–72 | 24–0 | Cameron Indoor Stadium; Durham, NC |
ACC tournament
| 1957/03/07 | vs. Clemson; ACC tournament | W 81–61 | 25–0 | Reynolds Coliseum; Raleigh, NC |
| 1957/03/08 | vs. Wake Forest; ACC tournament | W 61–59 | 26–0 | Reynolds Coliseum; Raleigh, NC |
| 1957/03/09 | vs. South Carolina; ACC tournament | W 95–75 | 27–0 | Reynolds Coliseum; Raleigh, NC |
NCAA tournament
| 1957/03/12 | vs. Yale; NCAA east regional quarterfinal | W 90–74 | 28–0 | Madison Square Garden; New York City |
| 1957/03/15 | vs. Canisius; NCAA east regional semifinal | W 87–75 | 29–0 | Palestra; Philadelphia, PA |
| 1957/03/16 | vs. Syracuse; NCAA east regional final | W 67–58 | 30–0 | Palestra; Philadelphia, PA |
| 1957/03/22 | vs. Michigan State; NCAA national semifinal | W 74–70^{3OT} | 31–0 | Municipal Auditorium; Kansas City, MO |
| 1957/03/23 | vs. Kansas; NCAA championship | W 54–53^{3OT} | 32–0 | Municipal Auditorium; Kansas City, MO |
*Non-conference game. ^{#}Rankings from AP Poll. (#) Tournament seedings in parentheses. All times are in Eastern Standard Time.

== Season summary ==
Hired away from St. John's in 1952 to make North Carolina basketball competitive with rival NC State, legendary coach Frank McGuire mined his native New York for talent. A veteran lineup led by star forward All-American Lennie Rosenbluth, who averaged 28 points, finished the season a perfect 32–0.

The team reached the Final Four, and subsequently won the national championship, with two triple overtime victories, over Michigan State and Johnny Green, and then Kansas and Wilt Chamberlain.

== Awards and honors ==
- Lennie Rosenbluth, Helms Foundation Player of the Year
- Lennie Rosenbluth, ACC Player of the Year
- Lennie Rosenbluth, 1st Team All-ACC
- Frank McGuire, UPI National Coach of the Year
- Frank McGuire, ACC Coach of the Year
- Tommy Kearns, 1st Team All-ACC
- Pete Brennan, 2nd Team All-ACC
