= 1956 Dixie Classic =

Mid-season college basketball tournament

- Season: 1956–57
- Teams: 8
- Finals site: Reynolds Coliseum; Raleigh, North Carolina
- Champions: North Carolina (1st title)
- Runner-up: Wake Forest (1st title game)
- Winning coach: Frank McGuire (1st title)
- MVP: Lennie Rosenbluth (North Carolina)
- Attendance: 71,200
- Top scorer: Lennie Rosenbluth (North Carolina) (86 points)

The 1956 Dixie Classic was a mid-season college basketball tournament held December 27–29, 1956 at NC State's Reynolds Coliseum in Raleigh, North Carolina. It was the eighth iteration of the Dixie Classic and it was part of the 1956–57 NCAA University Division men's basketball season.

Coming into the tournament, there was no clear favorite among the strong field, with reigning champion NC State holding the worst record of any team. Some noted teams were the 8th-ranked West Virginia Mountaineers, the 2nd-ranked North Carolina Tar Heels, and the 13th-ranked Duke Blue Devils. The Mountaineers were considered a serious threat as an undefeated team with two victories over teams in the "Big Four" already; however, no team outside of the Big Four had ever won the Dixie Classic.

In the first round, the Big Four teams swept their invited opponents. West Virginia's undefeated streak fell apart, as they lost all three games to finish last in the tournament. Wake Forest and North Carolina advanced out of the semifinal, and North Carolina won the final by a score of 63–55 to continue their undefeated streak. This streak ultimately lasted through the end of their season, and the Tar Heels would go on to win the NCAA tournament.

Lennie Rosenbluth of North Carolina was voted as the most outstanding player of the tournament. Across North Carolina's three games, he scored 86 points and led the tournament in rebounds, field goals, and free throws. Across the three days of six double-headers, the total attendance was 71,200.

== Teams ==
Each year, the Dixie Classic included the "Big Four" teams (Duke, NC State, North Carolina, and Wake Forest), as well as four other invited teams. The 1956 teams were:

- Wake Forest Demon Deacons
- DePaul Blue Demons
- NC State Wolfpack
- Iowa Hawkeyes
- Duke Blue Devils
- West Virginia Mountaineers
- North Carolina Tar Heels
- Utah Redskins

== Bracket ==
Consolation final
Dec. 29, 4:00pm
DePaul | 79
Utah | 86
Seventh place
Dec. 29, 2:00pm
Iowa | 79
West Virginia | 76

Consolation semifinals
Dec. 28, 2:00pm
DePaul | 73
Iowa | 72
Dec. 28, 7:30pm
West Virginia | 66
Utah | 83

Quarterfinals
Dec. 27, 2:00pm
Wake Forest | 74
DePaul | 68
Dec. 27, 4:00pm
NC State | 84
Iowa | 70
Dec. 27, 7:30pm
Duke | 73
West Virginia | 67
Dec. 27, 9:30pm
North Carolina | 97
Utah | 76

Semifinals
Dec. 28, 4:00pm
Wake Forest | 73
NC State | 66
Dec. 28, 9:30pm
Duke | 71
North Carolina | 81

Final
Dec. 29, 9:30pm
Wake Forest | 55
North Carolina | 63
Third place
Dec. 29, 7:30pm
NC State | 102
Duke | 80

== Game log ==
December 27
2:00pm

Wake Forest 74, DePaul 68
Scoring by half: 38–34, 36–34
| Pts: Murdock (19) | Pts: Heise (26) |

No. 1
Attendance: 12,000

December 27
4:00pm

NC State 84, Iowa 70
Scoring by half: 32–29, 52–41
| Pts: Maglio (21) | Pts: Martel (17) |

No. 2
Attendance: 12,000

December 27
7:30pm

Duke 73, West Virginia 67
Scoring by half: 38–34, 35–33
| Pts: Newcome (19) | Pts: Hundley (24) |

No. 3
Attendance: 12,400

December 27
9:30pm

North Carolina 97, Utah 76
Scoring by half: 42–32, 55–44
| Pts: Rosenbluth (26) | Pts: Kane (12) |

No. 4
Attendance: 12,400

December 28
2:00pm

DePaul 73, Iowa 72 (OT)
Scoring by half: 38–32, 27–33 Overtime: 8–7
| Pts: Heise (23) | Pts: Wordlaw (23) |

No. 5
Attendance: 12,000

December 28
4:00pm

Wake Forest 73, NC State 66
Scoring by half: 31–33, 42–33
| Pts: Carr (21) | Pts: Maglio (22) |

No. 6
Attendance: 12,000

December 28
7:30pm

West Virginia 66, Utah 83
Scoring by half: 31–50, 35–33
| Pts: Hundley (16) | Pts: Kane (22) |

No. 7

December 28
9:30pm

Duke 71, North Carolina 87
Scoring by half: 32–43, 39–44
| Pts: Newcome (19) | Pts: Rosenbluth (32) |

No. 8

December 29
2:00pm

Iowa 79, West Virginia 76
Scoring by half: 36–37, 43–39
| Pts: Wordlaw (21) | Pts: Sharrar (20) |

No. 9

December 29
4:00pm

DePaul 79, Utah 86
Scoring by half: 33–41, 46–45
| Pts: Heise (32) | Pts: Hale (19) |

No. 10

December 29
7:30pm

NC State 102, Duke 80
Scoring by half: 47–39, 55–41
| Pts: Richter (25) | Pts: Robertson (13) |

No. 11
Attendance: 12,400

December 29
9:30pm

Wake Forest 55, North Carolina 63
Scoring by half: 20–31, 35–32
| Pts: Williams (15) | Pts: Rosenbluth (18) |

No. 12
Attendance: 12,400
