= 1957 ACC men's basketball tournament =

Basketball tournament

- Classification: Division I
- Season: 1956–57
- Teams: 8
- Site: Reynolds Coliseum; Raleigh, North Carolina
- Champions: North Carolina (1st title)
- Winning coach: Frank McGuire (1st title)
- MVP: Lennie Rosenbluth (North Carolina)

1956–57 ACC men's basketball standings
	Conf.				Overall
Team	W		L	PCT	W		L	PCT
No. 1 North Carolina†	14	–	0	1.000	32	–	0	1.000
Maryland	9	–	5	.643	16	–	10	.615
Duke	8	–	6	.571	13	–	11	.542
No. 18 Wake Forest	7	–	7	.500	19	–	9	.679
NC State	7	–	7	.500	15	–	11	.577
South Carolina	5	–	9	.357	17	–	12	.586
Virginia	3	–	11	.214	6	–	19	.240
Clemson	3	–	11	.214	7	–	17	.292
† 1957 ACC tournament winner Rankings from AP Poll

The 1957 Atlantic Coast Conference men's basketball tournament was held in Raleigh, North Carolina, at Reynolds Coliseum from March 7–9, 1957. North Carolina defeated South Carolina, 95–75, to win the championship. Lennie Rosenbluth of North Carolina was named tournament MVP.

== Bracket ==
Quarterfinals; March 7
1	#1 North Carolina	81
8	Clemson	61
4	#20 Wake Forest	66
5	NC State	57
2	Maryland	71
7	Virginia	68
3	Duke	81
6	South Carolina	84

Semifinals; March 8
1	#1 North Carolina	61
4	#20 Wake Forest	59
2	Maryland	64
6	South Carolina	74

Championship Game; March 9
1	#1 North Carolina	95
6	South Carolina	75
