= Rudy D'Emilio =

American basketball player

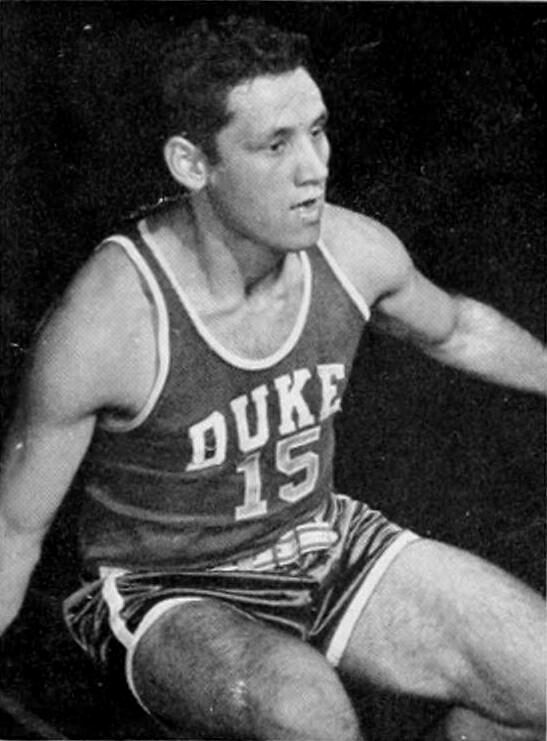
- D'Emilio with Duke, 1953–54

Personal information
- Born: 1931 or 1932 (age 94–95) Philadelphia, Pennsylvania
- Listed height: 5 ft 11 in (1.80 m)

Career information
- College: Duke (1951–54)
- NBA draft: 1954: 5th round, 39th overall pick
- Drafted by: Philadelphia Warriors
- Number: 15

Career highlights
- First-team All-ACC (1954)
- Stats at Basketball Reference

Rudy D'Emilio is a former basketball player known for his college career with the Duke Blue Devils.

== Biography ==
Rudy D'Emilio was born in 1931 or 1932, and grew up in Port Richmond, a neighborhood of Philadelphia, Pennsylvania. He attended Northeast High School. In 1950, he matriculated to Duke University in Durham, North Carolina. After a year on the freshman basketball team, he joined the Duke varsity team. His sophomore year, he averaged 11.2 points per game and played with two-time All-American Dick Groat. On December 1, 1951, Duke played Temple, whose roster included black Philadelphia native Sam Sylvester, in what is believed to be the first integrated game in the South. D'Emilio said in 2015 of the game, "When I played against Sam Sylvester in high school it was no big deal. But it was a big deal down there when we played Temple."

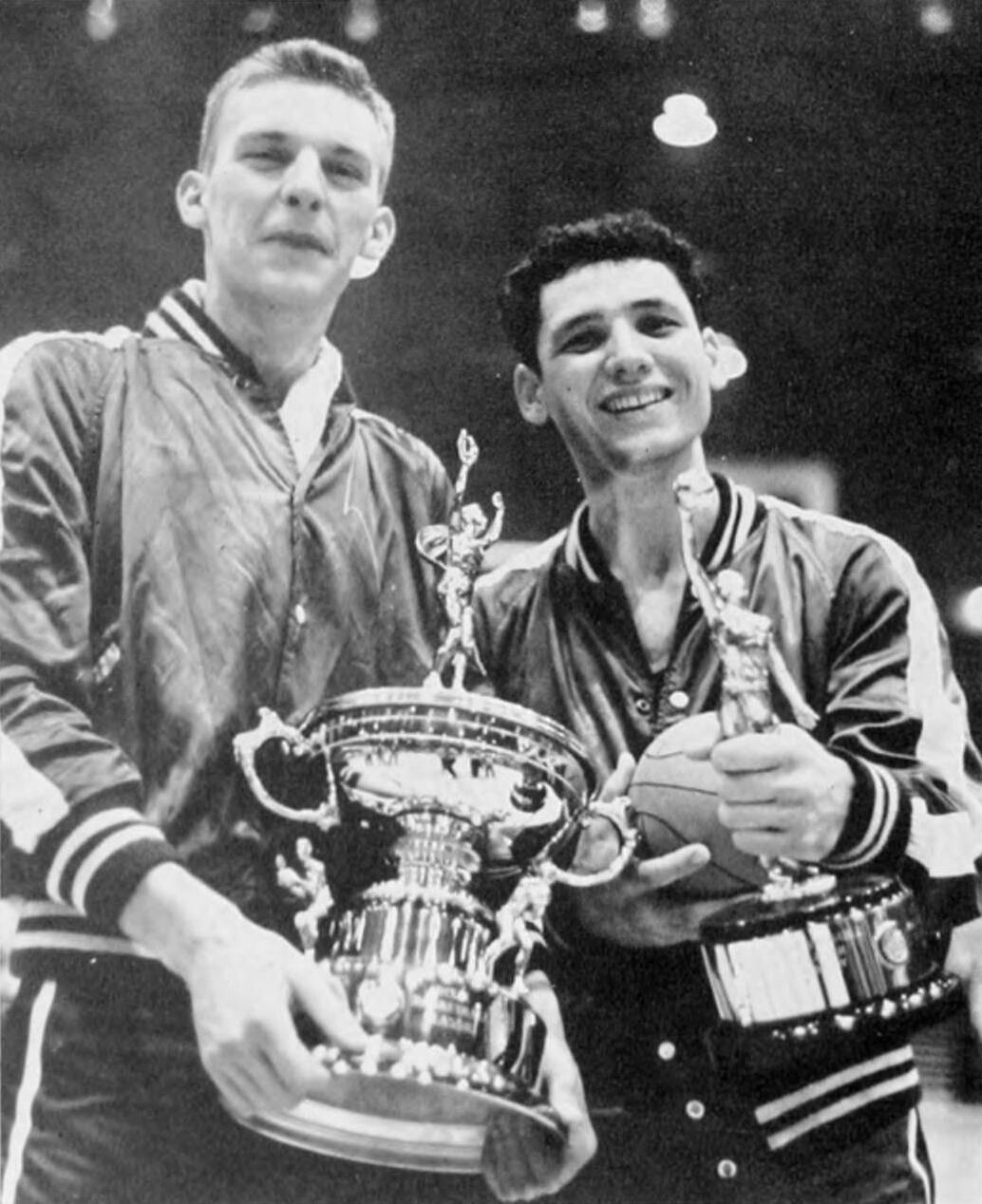
D'Emilio (right) and Bernie Janicki of Duke after winning the 1953 Dixie Classic

He took Duke's captain title for his junior year and maintained it through his senior year. Across his college career, he scored 1,028 points. In November 1953, he was dismissed from the Duke basketball team for participating on the Duke soccer team after basketball practices had started, but was soon reinstated. Duke won the 1953 Dixie Classic under D'Emilio's captaincy. D'Emilio scored 66 points across the three games of the tournament, second only to Don Lange of Navy, and was named as the tournament's most valuable player and to the all-Classic first team. That Duke squad also won the 1953–54 ACC regular season title and finished with a 21–6 record. D'Emilio was named to the 1953–54 all-ACC first team and the 1954 all-ACC tournament second team.

After college, D'Emilio was drafted by the Philadelphia Warriors as the 3rd pick in the 5th round (39th overall), but was not ultimately signed to the team. In 1954, he was signed to join the college All-Americans as part of the Boston Whirlwinds, a traveling team that played against the Harlem Globetrotters.

He spent two years in the U.S. Army. In 1970, he became the coach of the St. Thomas Aquinas High School basketball team in Edison, New Jersey. He coached there for seven seasons.

In 2011, he was named as an honorable mention on a Bleacher Report list of the top 50 players in Duke history. As of 2015, he was retired and living in Edison.
