= 1953 Dixie Classic =

Mid-season college basketball tournament

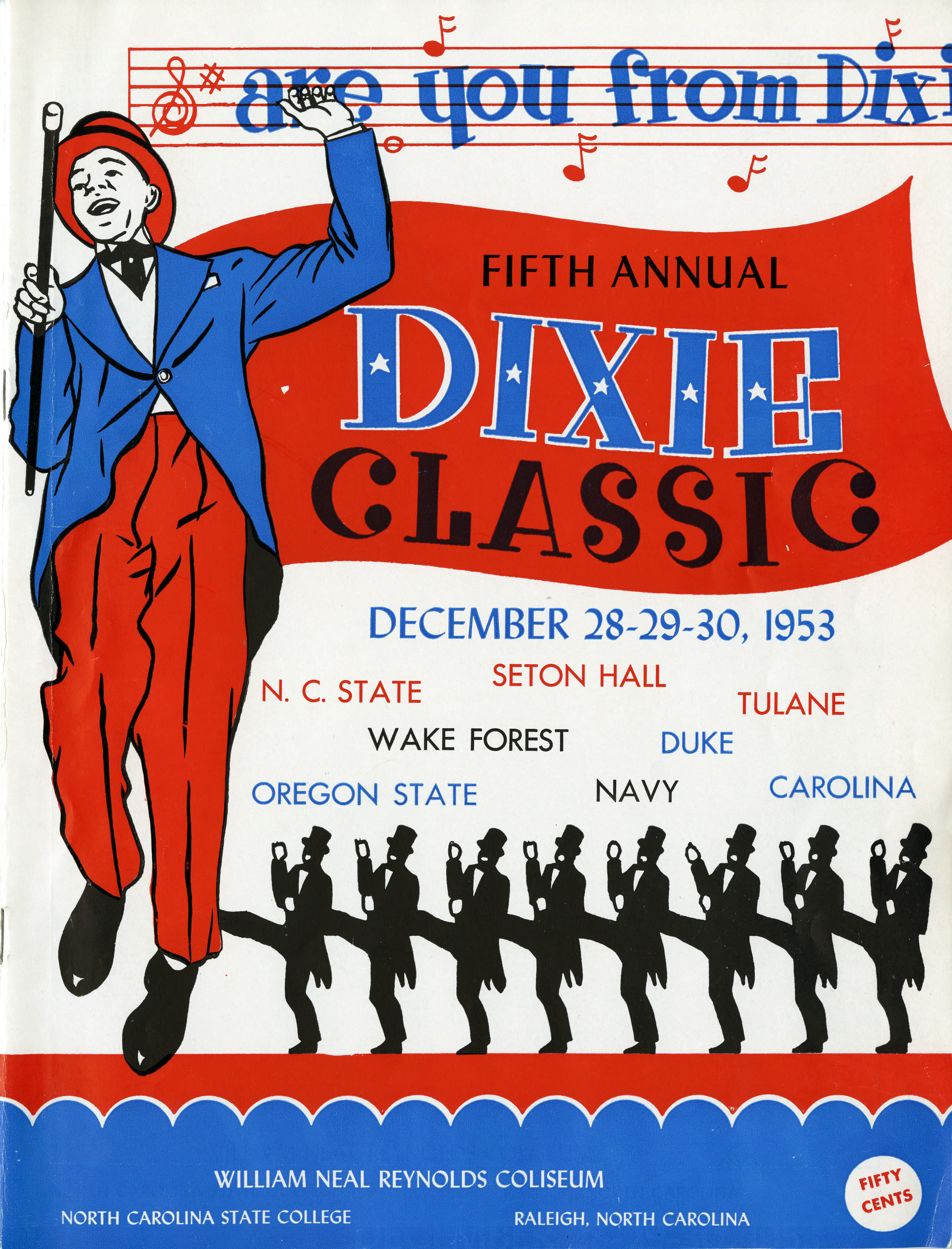
- Cover of the tournament program
- Season: 1953–54
- Teams: 8
- Finals site: Reynolds Coliseum; Raleigh, North Carolina
- Champions: Duke (1st title)
- Runner-up: Navy (1st title game)
- Winning coach: Harold Bradley (1st title)
- MVP: Rudy D'Emilio (Duke)
- Attendance: 60,000

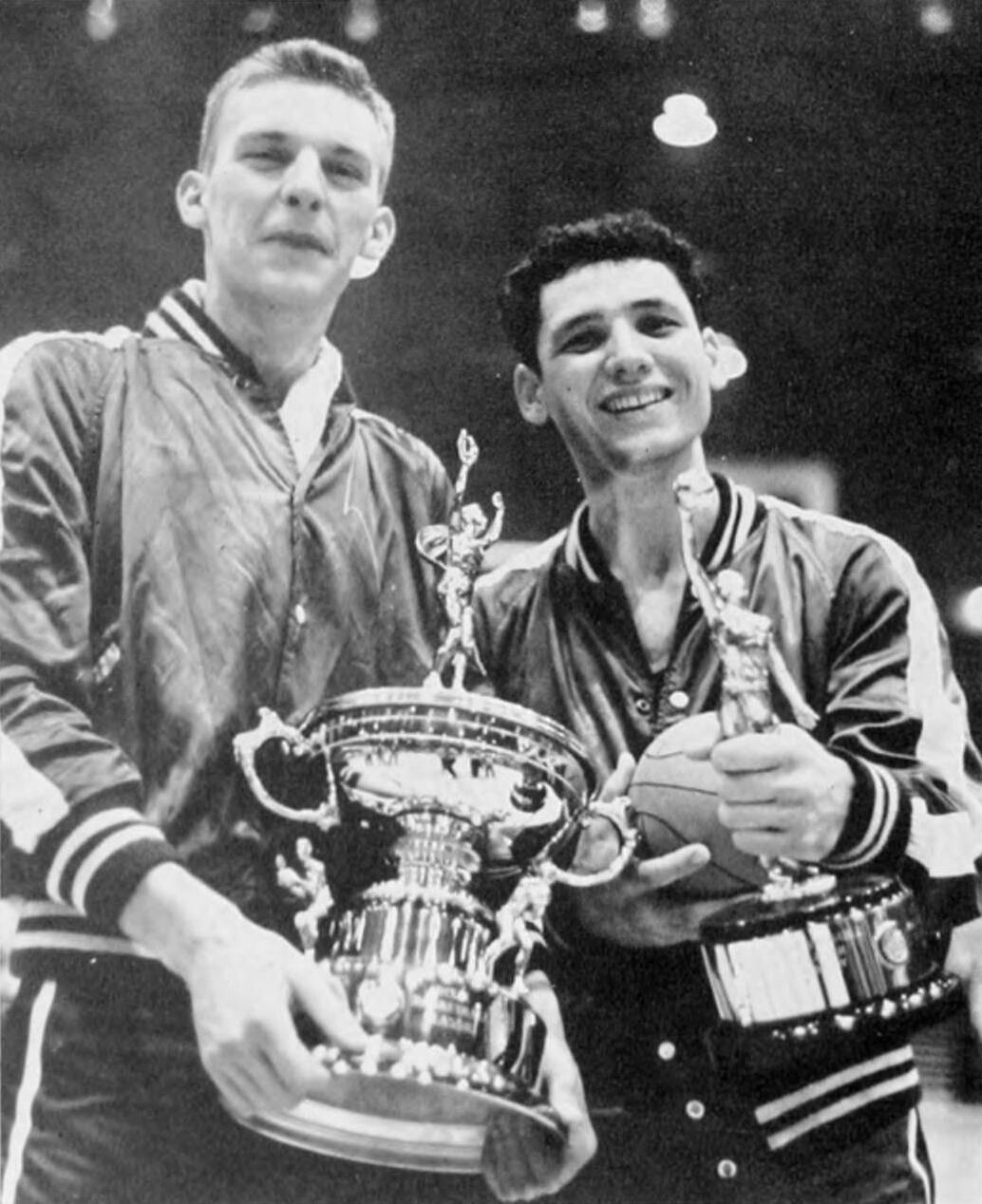
Bernie Janicki and Rudy D'Emilio of Duke with their trophies

The 1953 Dixie Classic was a mid-season college basketball tournament held December 28–30, 1953 at NC State's Reynolds Coliseum in Raleigh, North Carolina. It was the fifth iteration of the Dixie Classic and it was part of the 1953–54 NCAA men's basketball season. The Duke Blue Devils won the final, defeating the Navy Midshipmen 98–83.

Coming into the tournament, 9th-ranked host NC State, who had won the first four Dixie Classics, and 12th-ranked Oregon State were favorites to win the tournament. However, the final was contested by Duke and Navy. Duke won 98–83, breaking Navy's six-game unbeaten streak.

== Teams ==
Each year, the Dixie Classic included the "Big Four" teams (Duke, NC State, North Carolina, and Wake Forest), as well as four other invited teams. The 1953 teams were:

- Navy Midshipmen
- North Carolina Tar Heels
- Seton Hall Pirates
- NC State Wolfpack
- Oregon State Beavers
- Duke Blue Devils
- Tulane Green Wave
- Wake Forest Demon Deacons

== Bracket ==
Consolation final
Dec. 30, 4:00pm
Seton Hall	77
Tulane	68
Seventh place
Dec. 30, 2:00pm
North Carolina	53
Oregon State	65

Consolation semifinals
Dec. 29, 2:00pm
North Carolina	63
Seton Hall	73
Dec. 29, 7:30pm
Oregon State	70
Tulane	74

Quarterfinals
Dec. 28, 2:00pm
North Carolina	62
Navy	86
Dec. 28, 4:00pm
NC State	72
Seton Hall	70
Dec. 28, 7:30pm
Duke	71
Oregon State	61
Dec. 28, 9:30pm
Wake Forest	72
Tulane	65

Semifinals
Dec. 29, 4:00pm
Navy	85
NC State	75
Dec. 29, 9:30pm
Duke	83
Wake Forest	66

Final
Dec. 30, 9:00pm
Navy	83
Duke	98
Third place
Dec. 30, 7:30pm
NC State	79
Wake Forest	86

== Game log ==
December 28
2:00pm

North Carolina 62, Navy 86
Scoring by quarter: 16–27, 17–21, 14–14, 15–24
Pts: Radovich (15)	Pts: Lange (29)

No. 1
Attendance: 11,600

December 28
4:00pm

NC State 72, Seton Hall 70
Scoring by quarter: 17–19, 14–18, 21–21, 20–12
Pts: Molodet (19)	Pts: Brooks (19)

No. 2
Attendance: 11,600

December 28
7:30pm

Duke 71, Oregon State 61
Scoring by quarter: 20–17, 15–11, 18–14, 18–19
Pts: D'Emilio, Belmont (19)	Pts: Halbrook (23)

No. 3
Attendance: 12,000

December 28
9:30pm

Wake Forest 72, Tulane 65
Scoring by quarter: 14–13, 16–20, 21–16, 21–16
Pts: Davis (25)	Pts: P. Wallace (18)

No. 4
Attendance: 12,000

December 29
2:00pm

North Carolina 63, Seton Hall 73
Scoring by quarter: 17–16, 11–16, 19–19, 16–22
Pts: Likins (16)	Pts: Ring (18)

No. 5
Attendance: 9,500

December 29
4:00pm

Navy 85, NC State 75
Scoring by quarter: 16–19, 16–20, 24–16, 29–20
Pts: Clune (27)	Pts: Thompson (23)

No. 6
Attendance: 9,500

December 29
7:30pm

Oregon State 70, Tulane 74
Scoring by quarter: 21–16, 23–19, 6–19, 20–20
Pts: Halbrook (23)	Pts: Cervini (18)

No. 7

December 29
9:30pm

Duke 83, Wake Forest 66
Scoring by quarter: 30–10, 13–22, 22–21, 18–13
Pts: D'Emilio (23)	Pts: Hemric (26)

No. 8

December 30
2:00pm

North Carolina 53, Oregon State 65
Scoring by quarter: 11–22, 6–18, 18–9, 18–16
Pts: Maddie (17)	Pts: Halbrook (16)

No. 9

December 30
4:00pm

Seton Hall 77, Tulane 68
Scoring by quarter: 22–21, 16–19, 18–15, 21–13
Pts: Long (21)	Pts: Brennan, Stoll (13)

No. 10

December 30
7:30pm

NC State 79, Wake Forest 86
Scoring by quarter: 21–24, 13–21, 14–21, 31–20
Pts: Thompson (24)	Pts: Hemric (24)

No. 11
Attendance: 12,000

December 30
9:00pm

Navy 83, Duke 98
Scoring by quarter: 22–25, 20–21, 19–20, 22–32
Pts: Lange (25)	Pts: D'Emilio (24)

No. 12
Attendance: 12,000
