= 1953–54 Duke Blue Devils men's basketball team =

American college basketball season

1953–54 Duke Blue Devils men's basketball

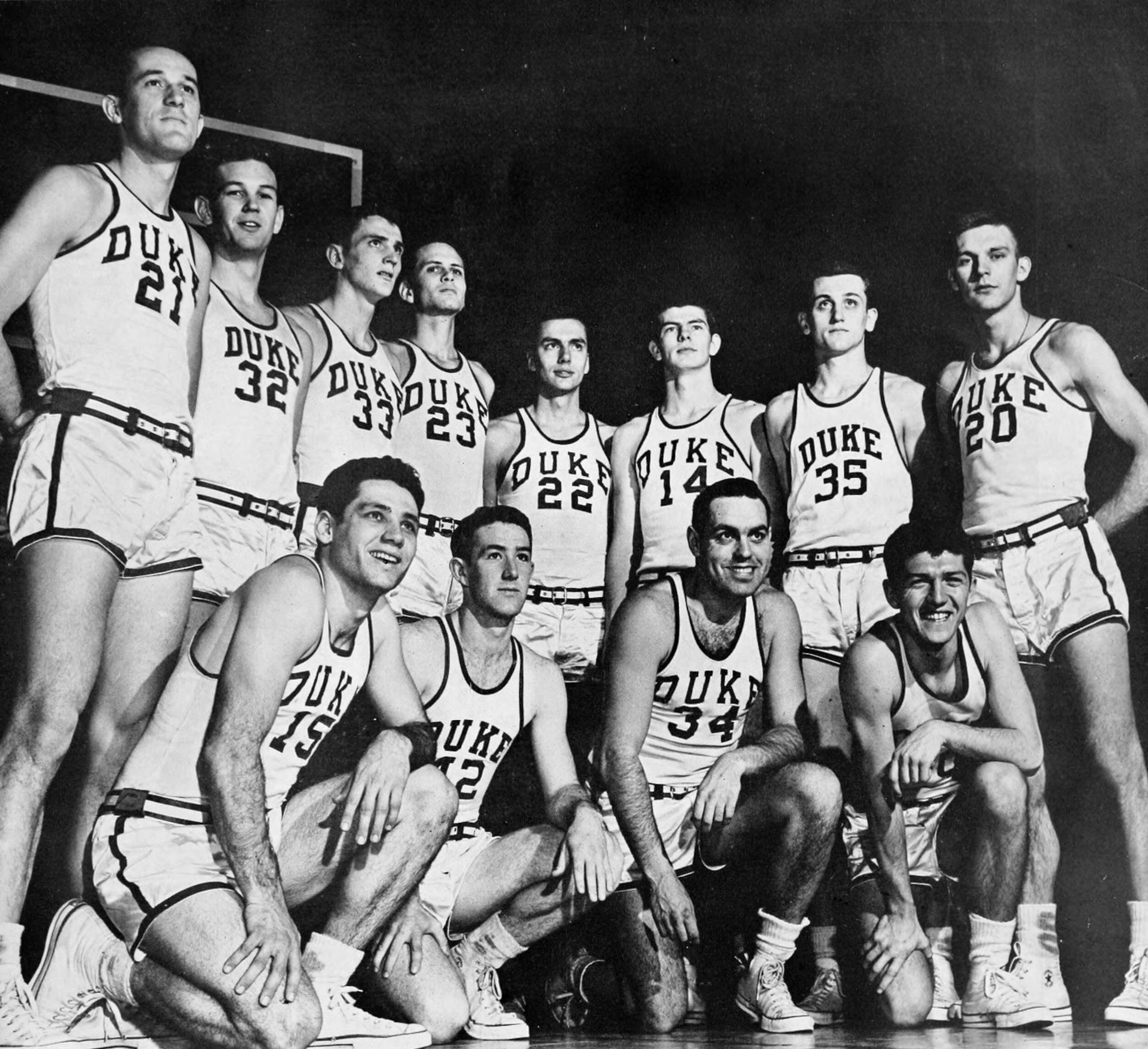

ACC regular season champion Dixie Classic champion
- Conference: Atlantic Coast Conference

Ranking
- AP: No. 15
- Record: 21–6 (9–1 ACC)
- Head coach: Harold Bradley (4th season)
- Home arena: Cameron Indoor Stadium

1953–54 ACC men's basketball standings
	Conf.				Overall
Team	W		L	PCT	W		L	PCT
No. 15 Duke	9	–	1	.900	21	–	6	.778
No. 20 Maryland	7	–	2	.778	23	–	7	.767
Wake Forest	8	–	4	.667	17	–	12	.586
NC State †	5	–	3	.625	26	–	7	.788
North Carolina	5	–	6	.455	11	–	10	.524
South Carolina	2	–	8	.200	10	–	16	.385
Virginia	1	–	4	.200	16	–	11	.593
Clemson	0	–	9	.000	5	–	18	.217
† 1954 ACC tournament winner Rankings from AP Poll

The 1953–54 Duke Blue Devils men's basketball team represented Duke University in the 1953–54 NCAA men's basketball season. The team's head coach was Harold Bradley and the team finished the season with an overall record of 21–6. They won the 1953 Dixie Classic, defeating Navy 98–83 in the final.
