= 1953–54 North Carolina Tar Heels men's basketball team =

American college basketball season

1953–54 North Carolina Tar Heels men's basketball
- Conference: Atlantic Coast Conference
- Record: 11–10 (5–6 ACC)
- Head coach: Frank McGuire
- Assistant coach: Buck Freeman
- Home arena: Woollen Gymnasium

1953–54 ACC men's basketball standings
	Conf.				Overall
Team	W		L	PCT	W		L	PCT
No. 15 Duke	9	–	1	.900	21	–	6	.778
No. 20 Maryland	7	–	2	.778	23	–	7	.767
Wake Forest	8	–	4	.667	17	–	12	.586
NC State †	5	–	3	.625	26	–	7	.788
North Carolina	5	–	6	.455	11	–	10	.524
South Carolina	2	–	8	.200	10	–	16	.385
Virginia	1	–	4	.200	16	–	11	.593
Clemson	0	–	9	.000	5	–	18	.217
† 1954 ACC tournament winner Rankings from AP Poll

The 1953–54 North Carolina Tar Heels men's basketball team represented the University of North Carolina at Chapel Hill. The head coach was Frank McGuire. The team played its home games at Woollen Gymnasium in Chapel Hill, North Carolina, and was a member of the Atlantic Coast Conference.

1953–54 Record: 11–10; H: 7–3, A: 4–3, N: 1–4 ACC 5–6, 5th Place

Coach: Frank McGuire

== Schedule and results ==
Date time, TV	Rank^{#}	Opponent^{#}	Result	Record	Site city, state
Dec 11, 1953*		William & Mary	W 71–61	1–0	Woollen Gymnasium; Chapel Hill, NC
Dec 12, 1953		South Carolina	W 82–56	2–0	Woollen Gymnasium; Chapel Hill, NC
Dec 19, 1953		Clemson	W 85–48	3–0	Woollen Gymnasium; Chapel Hill, NC
Dec 28, 1953*		Navy; Dixie Classic quarterfinal	L 62–86	3–1	Reynolds Coliseum; Raleigh, NC
Dec 29, 1953*		Seton Hall; Dixie Classic consolation semifinals	L 63–73	3–2	Reynolds Coliseum; Raleigh, NC
Dec 30, 1953*		No. 4 Oregon State; Dixie Classic seventh place game	L 53–65	3–3	Reynolds Coliseum; Raleigh, NC
Jan 8, 1954		The Citadel	W 83–42	4–3	Woollen Gymnasium; Chapel Hill, NC
Jan 9, 1954		at Wake Forest	W 66–65	5–3	
Jan 11, 1954		at Davidson	W 70-54	6-3	

January 16 Virginia H W 78–66
January 19 NC State H L 77–84
February 2 Washington and Lee LY W 69–60
February 4 Duke (-/8) A L 47–63
February 8 Virginia A L 69–83
February 11 Wake Forest H L 62–76
February 13 Clemson (-/14) A W 72–56
February 16 Davidson H W 89–69
February 20 Duke (-/14) H L 63–67
February 24 NC State A L 48–57
February 27 The Citadel A W 79–52
ACC Tournament
March 4 NC State (-/18) RAL L 51–52

== Roster ==
Name	#	Height	Year	Home Town
Gene Clancy	20	6–0	Sophomore	Belleville, NJ
Dick Kocornik	40	6–5	Senior	West Orange, NJ
Al Lifson	21	6–2	Junior	Elizabeth, NJ
Paul Likins	41	6–9	Junior	Elkhart, IN
Al Long	25	6–0	Junior	Durham, NC
Bud Maddie	42	6–4	Senior	Bronx, NY
Gerry McCabe	31	6–3	Sophomore	New York, NY
Tony Radovich	44	6–2	Senior	Hoboken, NJ
Cooper Taylor	35	5–10	Senior	Raleigh, NC
Jerry Vayda	43	6–4	Sophomore	Bayonne, NJ
Cliff Walker	30	6–4	Sophomore	Durham, NC
Skippy Winstead	23	6–2	Senior	Roxboro, NC
