= 1954 ACC men's basketball tournament =

- Classification: Division I
- Season: 1953–54
- Teams: 8
- Site: Reynolds Coliseum; Raleigh, North Carolina
- Champions: NC State (1st title)
- Winning coach: Everett Case (1st title)
- MVP: Dickie Hemric (Wake Forest)

1953–54 ACC men's basketball standings
	Conf.				Overall
Team	W		L	PCT	W		L	PCT
No. 15 Duke	9	–	1	.900	21	–	6	.778
No. 20 Maryland	7	–	2	.778	23	–	7	.767
Wake Forest	8	–	4	.667	17	–	12	.586
NC State †	5	–	3	.625	26	–	7	.788
North Carolina	5	–	6	.455	11	–	10	.524
South Carolina	2	–	8	.200	10	–	16	.385
Virginia	1	–	4	.200	16	–	11	.593
Clemson	0	–	9	.000	5	–	18	.217
† 1954 ACC tournament winner Rankings from AP Poll

The inaugural Atlantic Coast Conference men's basketball tournament was held in Raleigh, North Carolina, at Reynolds Coliseum from March 4–6, 1954. NC State defeated Wake Forest, 82–80 in overtime, to win the championship. Dickie Hemric of Wake Forest was named tournament MVP.

NC State defeated all three of their in-state rivals on their way to the tournament championship, beating North Carolina in the quarterfinal round, Duke in the semifinal, and Wake Forest in the championship game.

== Bracket ==
Quarterfinals; March 4
1	#11 Duke	96
8	Virginia	68
4	#18 NC State	52
5	North Carolina	51
2	#17 Maryland	75
7	Clemson	59
3	Wake Forest	58^{OT}
6	South Carolina	57

Semifinals; March 5
1	#11 Duke	75
4	#18 NC State	79
2	#17 Maryland	56
3	Wake Forest	64^{OT}

Championship Game; March 6
4	#18 NC State	82^{OT}
3	Wake Forest	80
