= Atlantic Coast Conference Men's Basketball Player of the Year =

Award for Basketball players in the Atlantic Coast Conference

ACC Men's Basketball Player of the Year
- Awarded for: the most outstanding male basketball player in the Atlantic Coast Conference
- Country: United States
- Presented by: Atlantic Coast Sports Media Association (1954–present); ACC head coaches (2013–2016)

History
- First award: 1954
- Most recent: Cameron Boozer, Duke

The Atlantic Coast Conference Men's Basketball Player of the Year is an award given to the men's basketball player in the Atlantic Coast Conference (ACC) voted as the most outstanding player. It has been presented since the league's first season, 1953–54, by the Atlantic Coast Sports Media Association, and from the 2012–13 season to the 2015–16 season also presented awards from separate voting by the league's head coaches. The award was first given to Dickie Hemric of Wake Forest, and the coaches' award was first presented in 2013 to Shane Larkin of Miami.

Two players have won the award three times: David Thompson of NC State and Ralph Sampson of Virginia. Hemric, Len Chappell, Larry Miller, John Roche, Len Bias, Danny Ferry, Tim Duncan and JJ Redick have won the award twice. There have been two ties in the award's history, which occurred at the end of the 2000–01 and 2012–13 seasons: In 2000–01 Joseph Forte of North Carolina and Shane Battier of Duke shared the award, while in 2012–13 Erick Green of Virginia Tech and Larkin shared honors. Green and Larkin split the honor in the first year that the ACC began voting for players of the year by the conference's coaches and media separately (the media chose Green while the coaches chose Larkin).

== Key ==
†	Co-Players of the Year
*	Awarded a national player of the year award that same season: Helms Foundation College Basketball Player of the Year (1904–05 to 1978–79); UPI College Basketball Player of the Year (1954–55 to 1995–96); Oscar Robertson Trophy (1958–59 to present); Naismith College Player of the Year (1968–69 to present); John R. Wooden Award (1976–77 to present)
M	ACC media's selection (2013–2016)
C	ACC coaches' selection (2013–2016)
Player (X)	Denotes the number of times the player had been awarded the ACC Player of the Year award at that point

== Winners ==
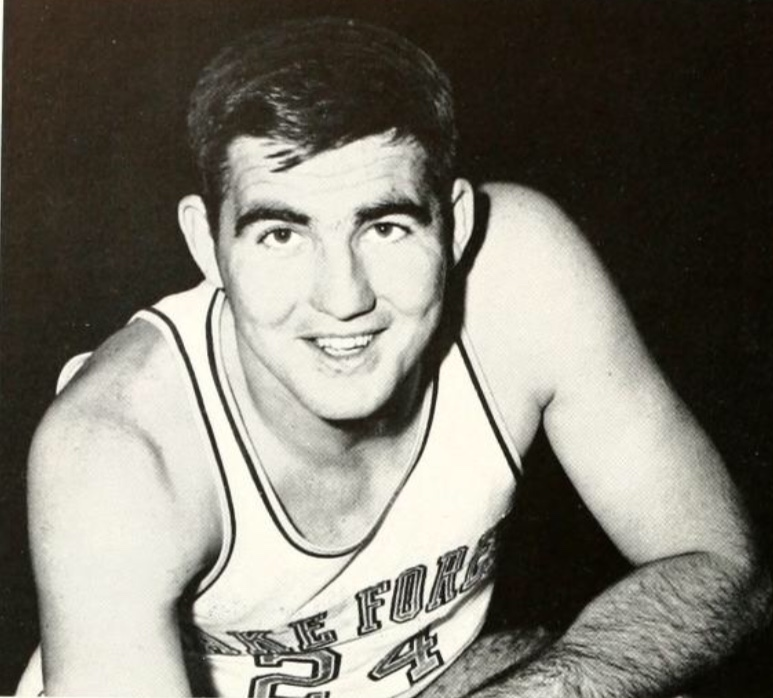
Dickie Hemric, Wake Forest, 1954 and 1955

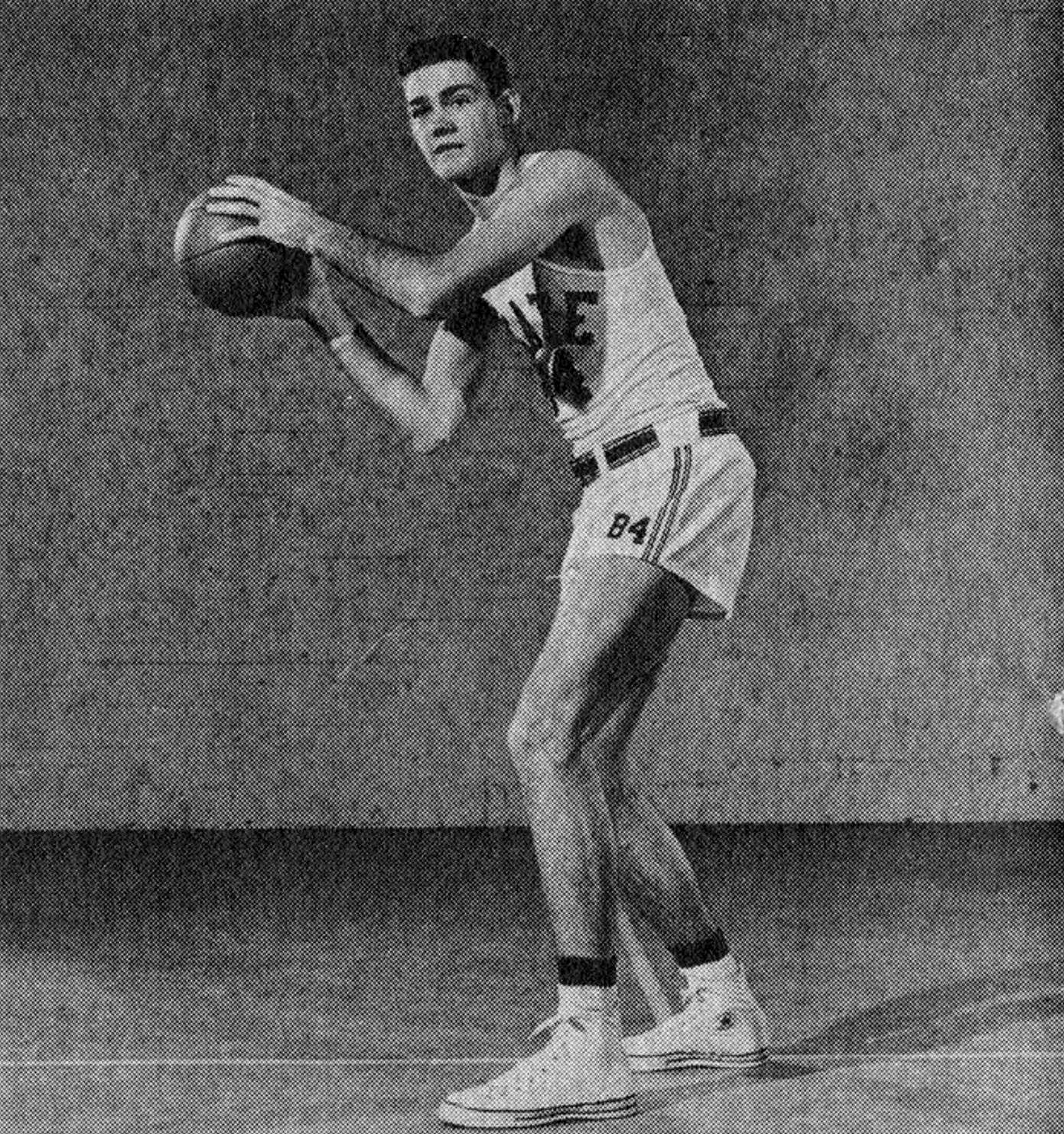
Ronnie Shavlik, NC State, 1956

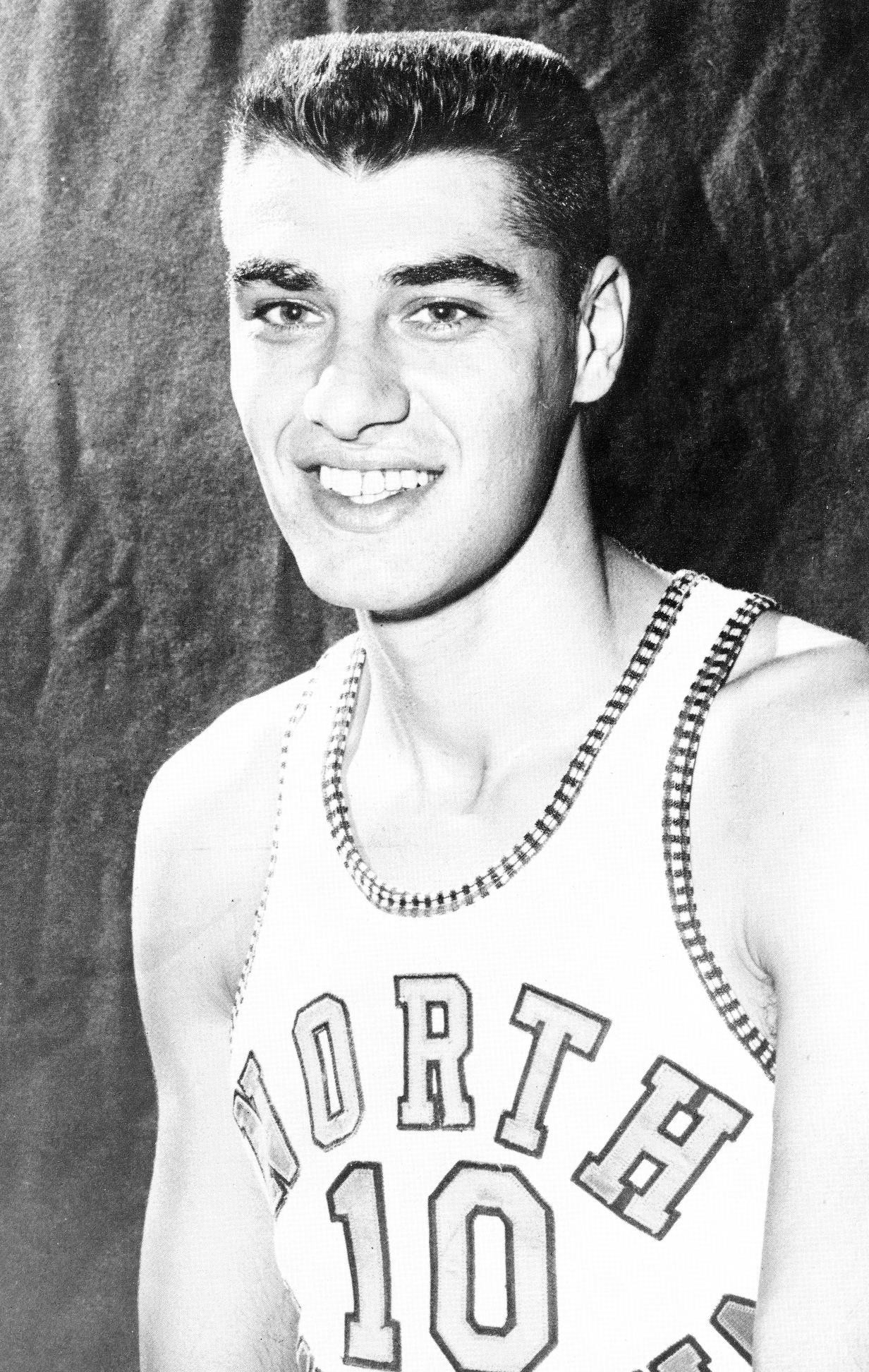
Lennie Rosenbluth, North Carolina, 1957

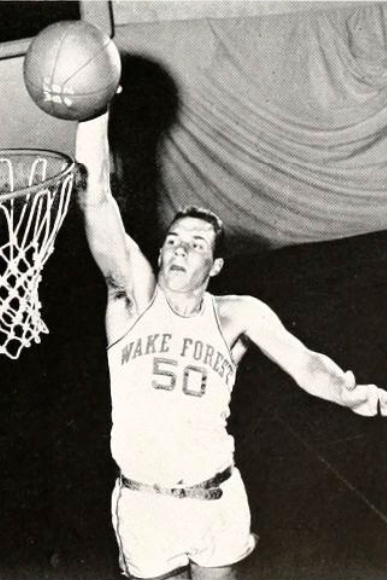
Len Chappell, Wake Forest, 1961 and 1962

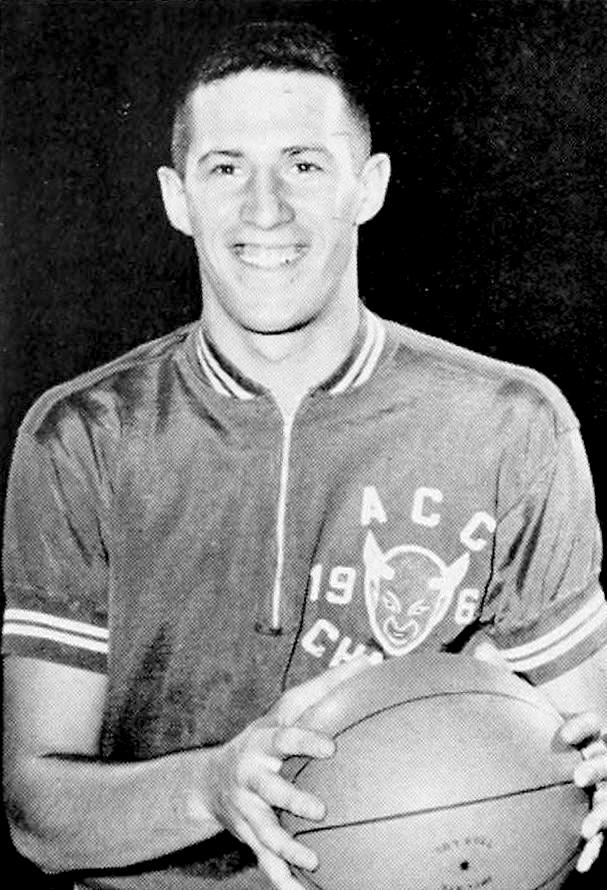
Art Heyman, Duke, 1963

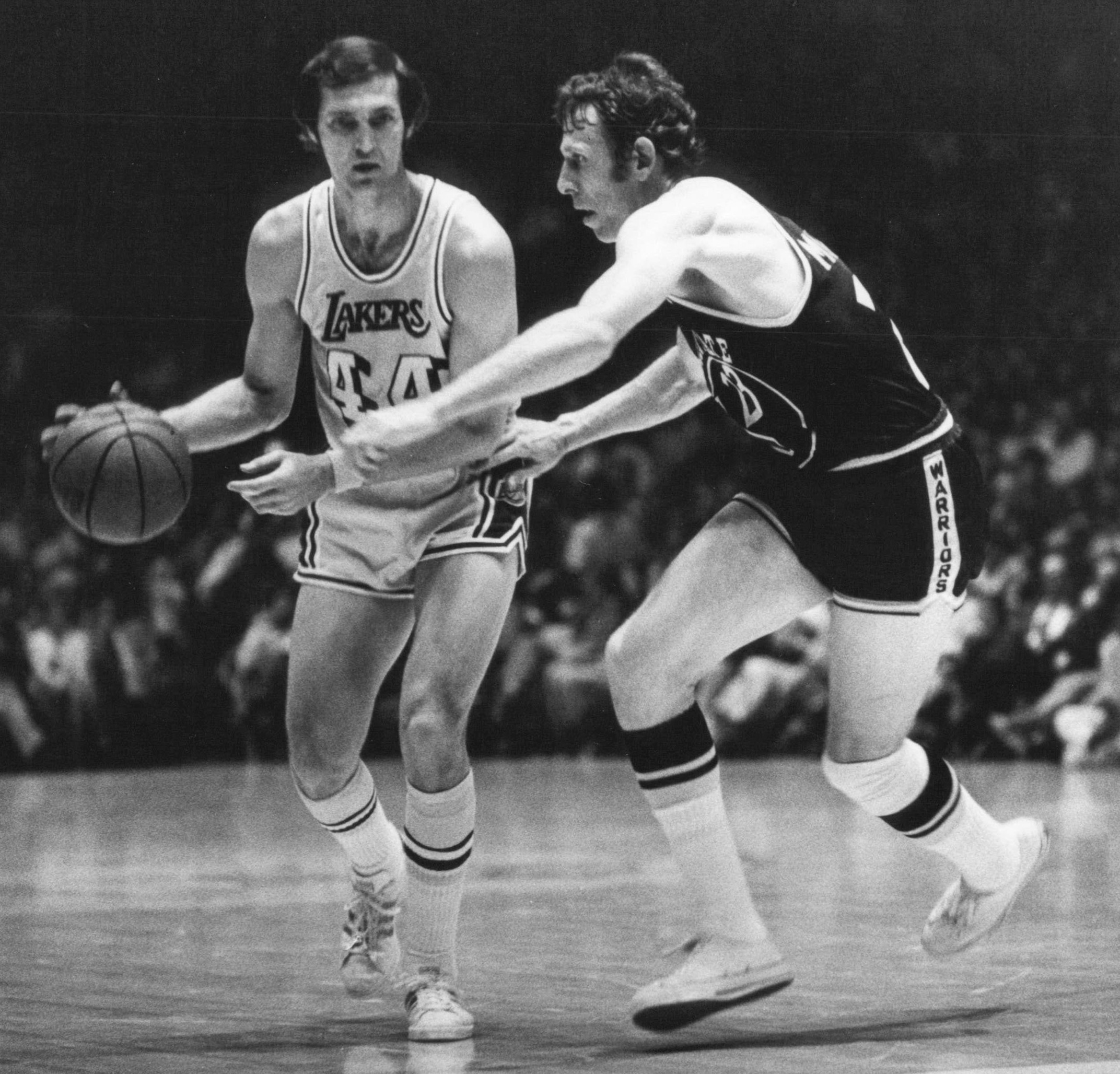
Jeff Mullins (r), Duke, 1964

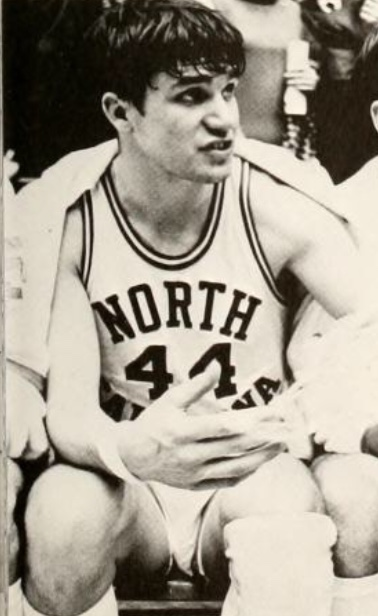
Larry Miller, North Carolina, 1967 and 1968

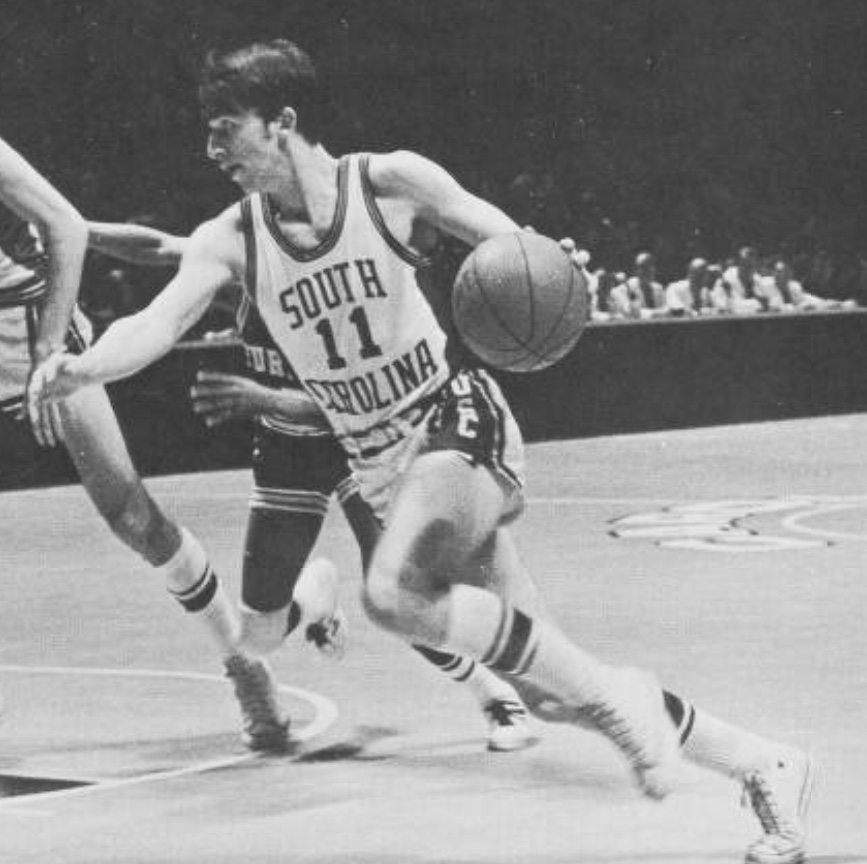
John Roche, South Carolina, 1968 and 1969

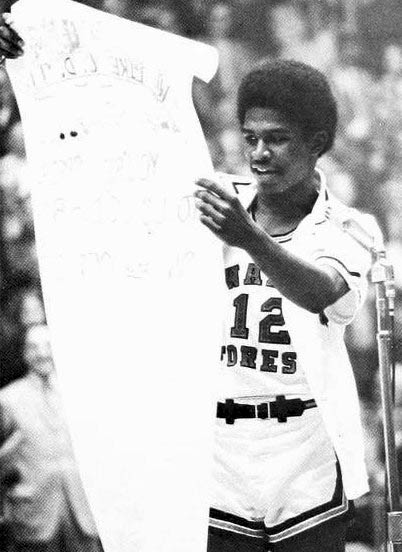
Charlie Davis, Wake Forest, 1971

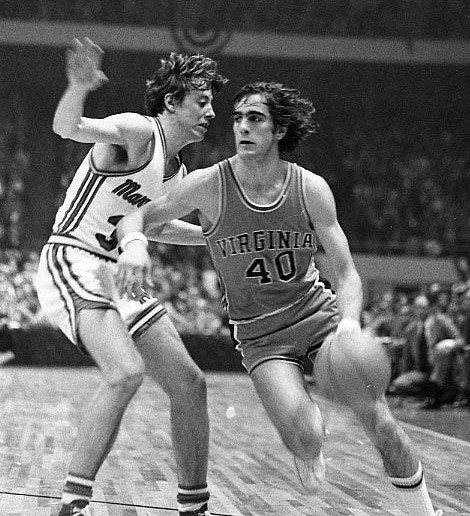
Barry Parkhill, Virginia, 1972

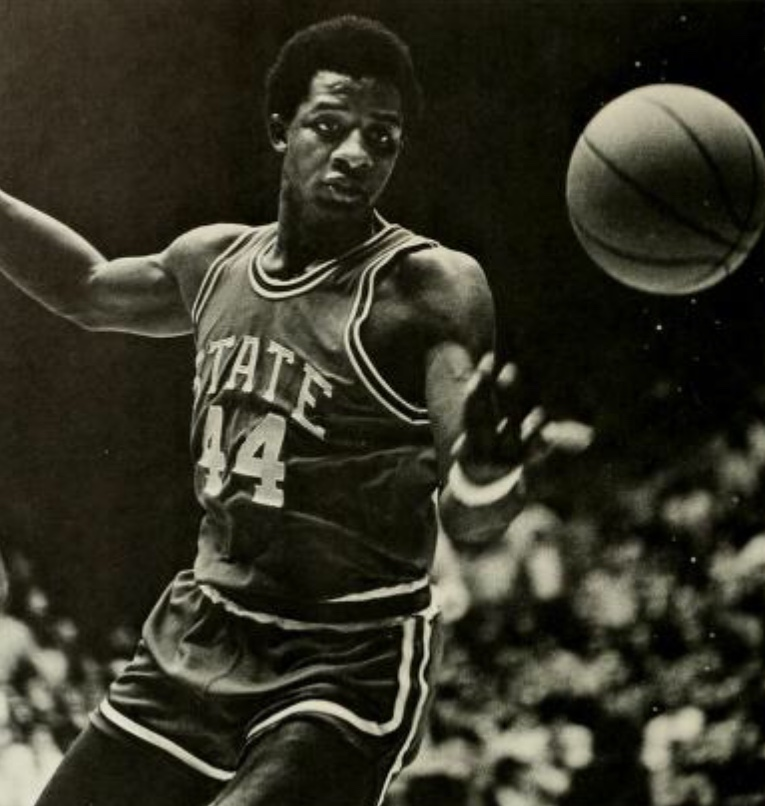
David Thompson, NC State, 1973 through 1975

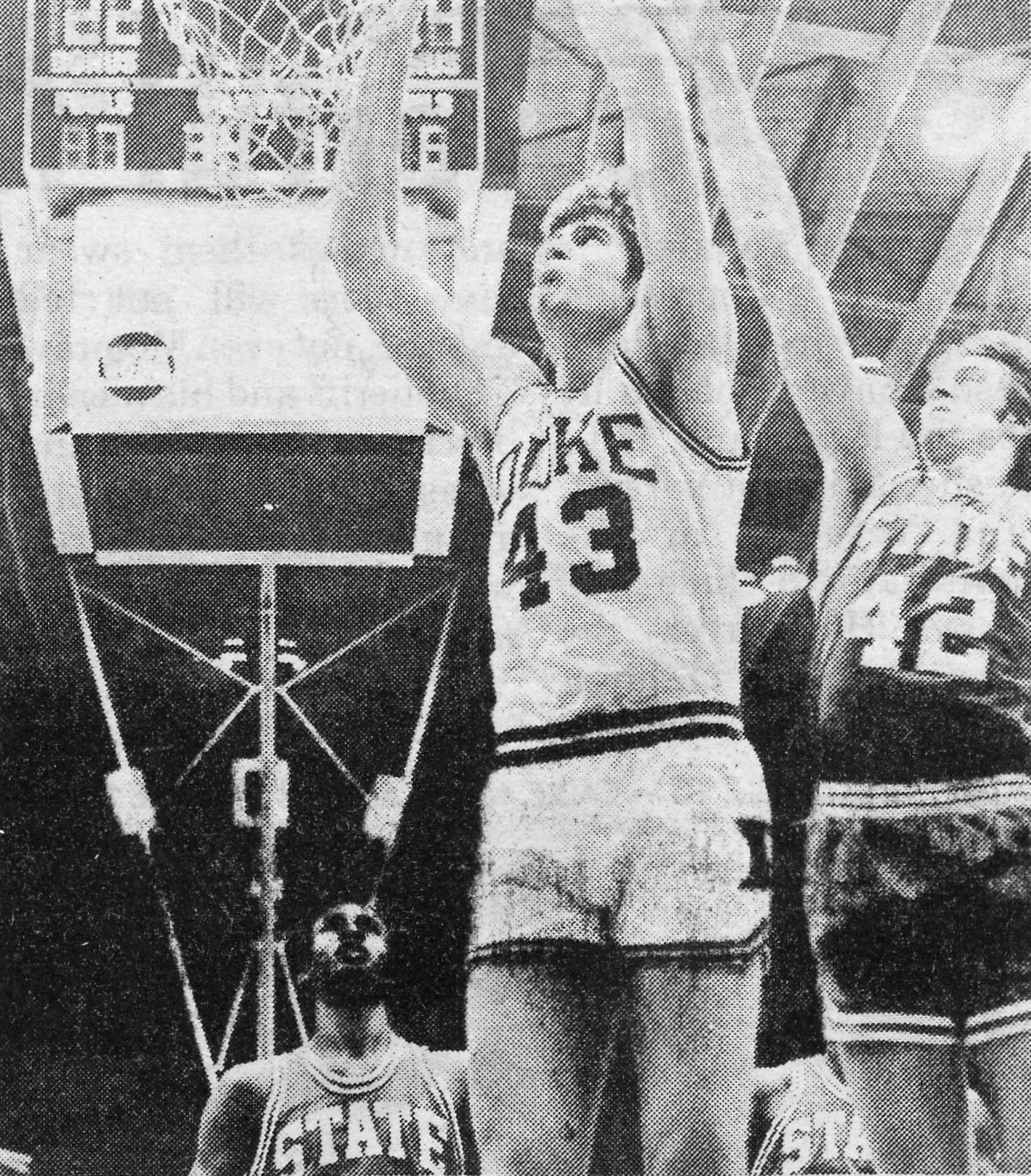
Mike Gminski, Duke, 1979

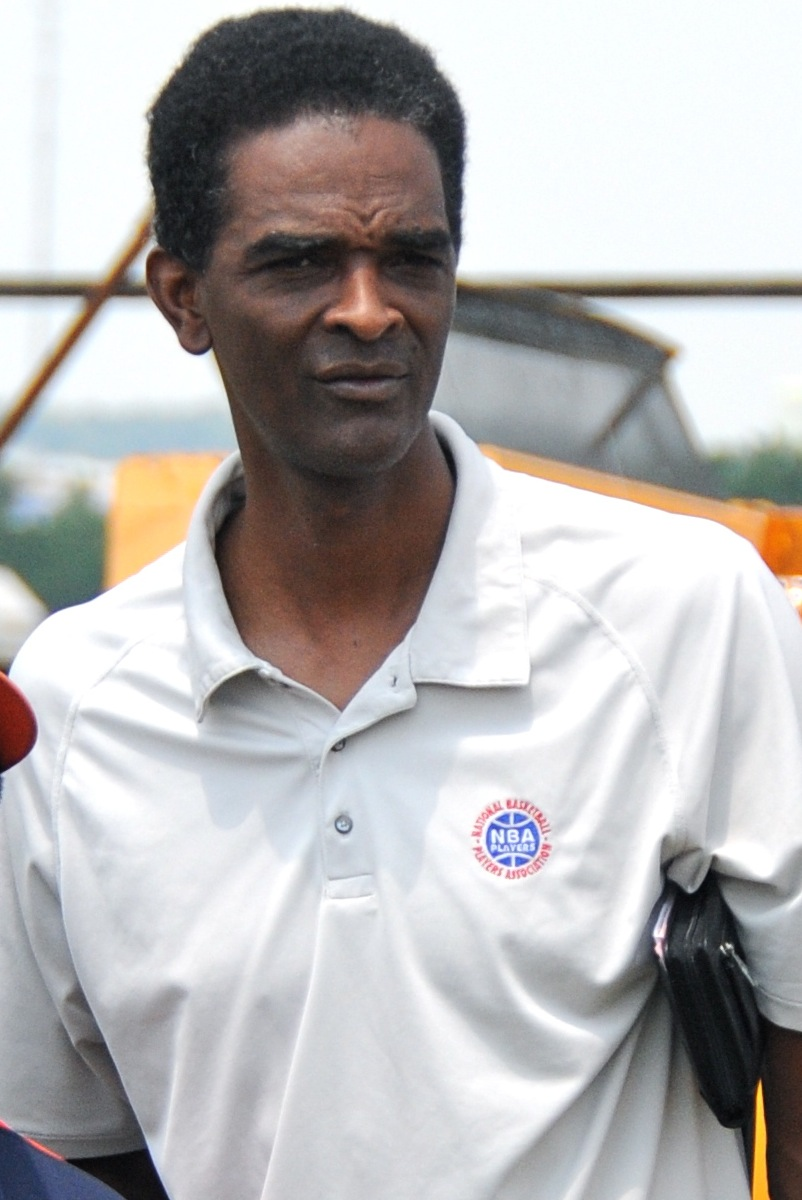
Ralph Sampson, Virginia, 1981 through 1983

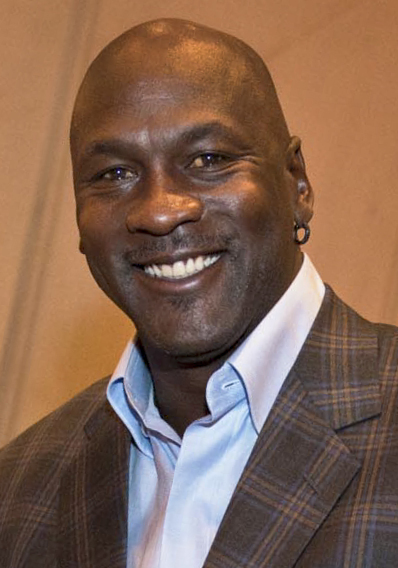
Michael Jordan, North Carolina, 1984

Len Bias, Maryland, 1985 and 1986

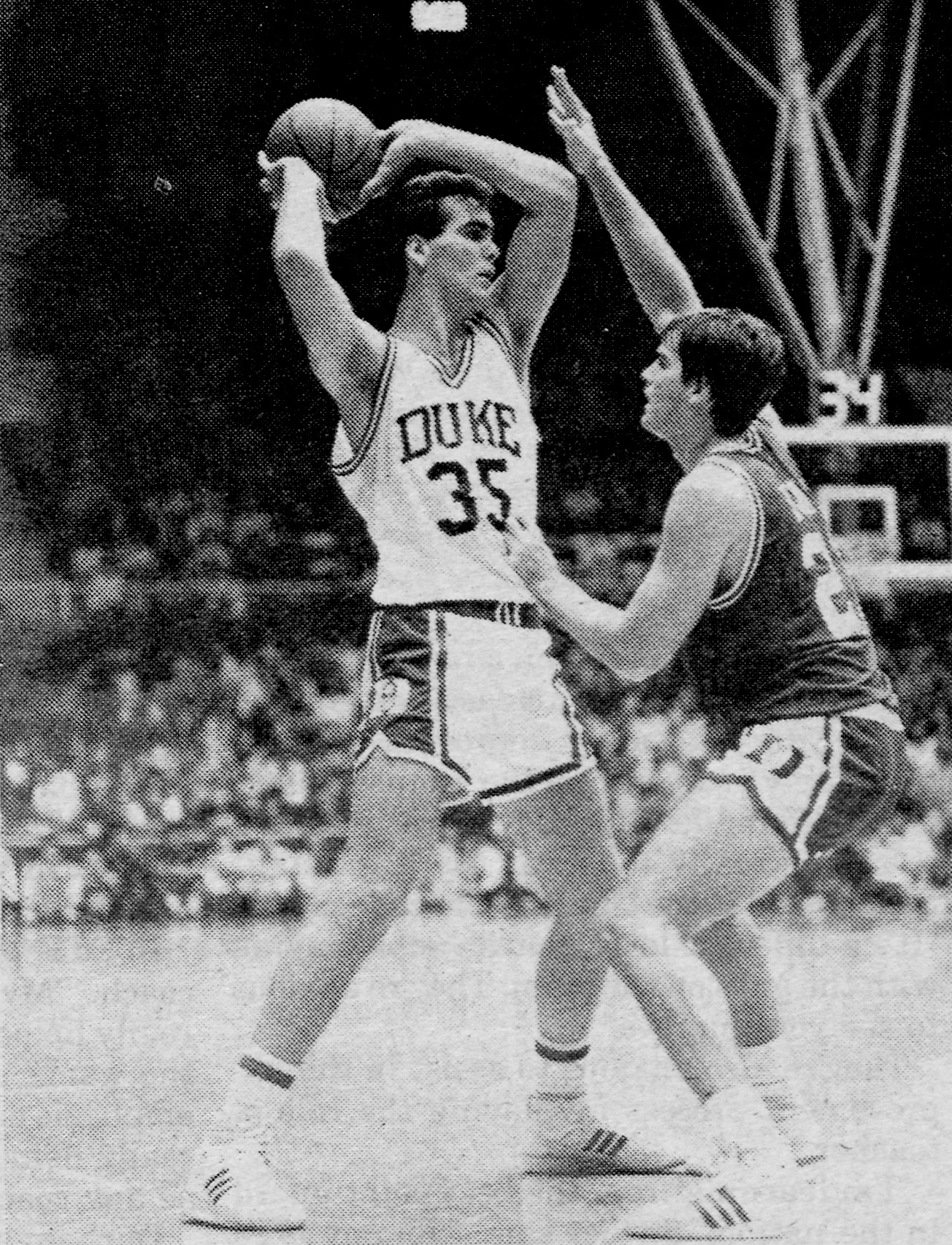
Danny Ferry, Duke, 1988 and 1989

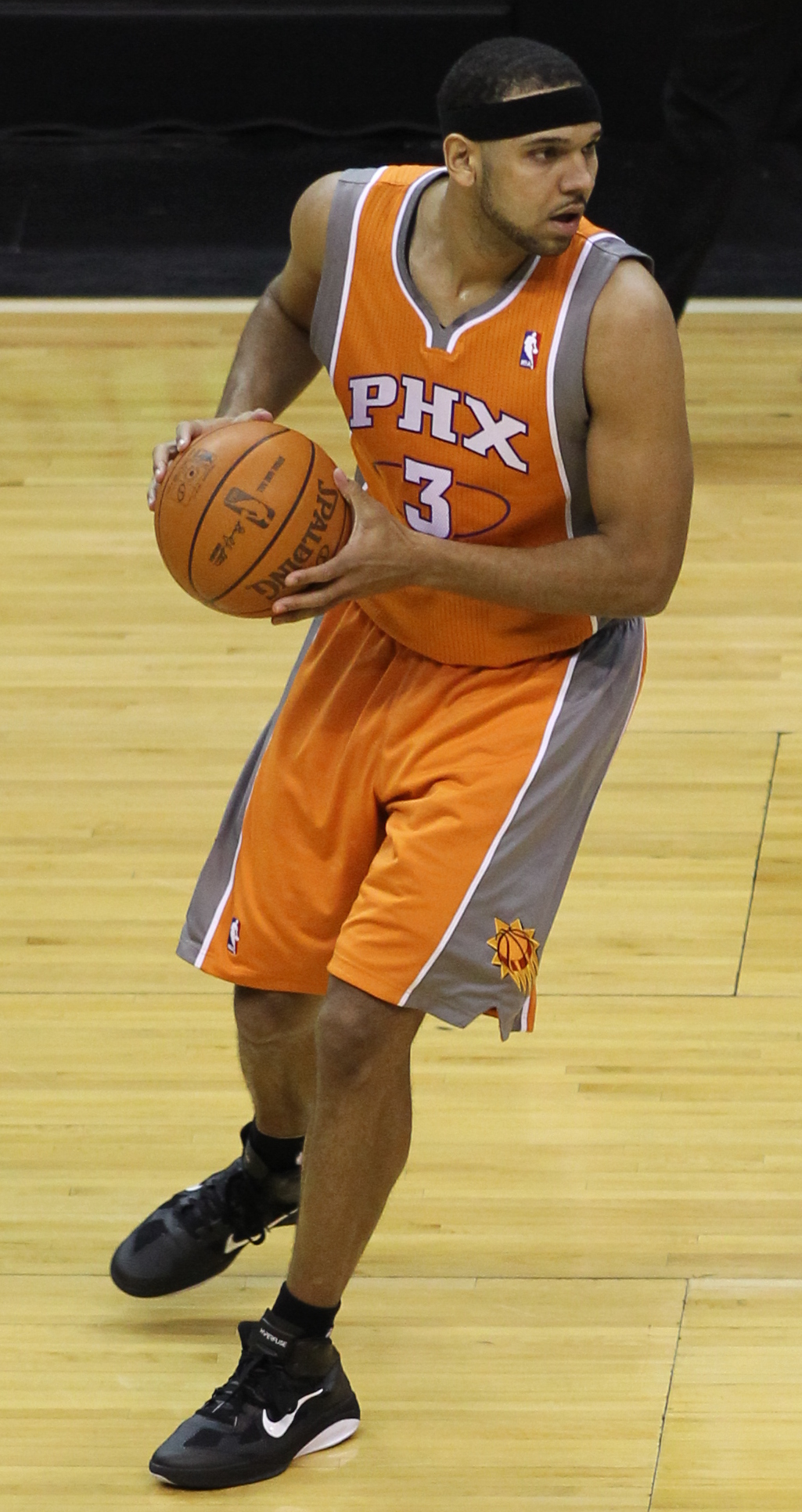
Jared Dudley, Boston College, 2007

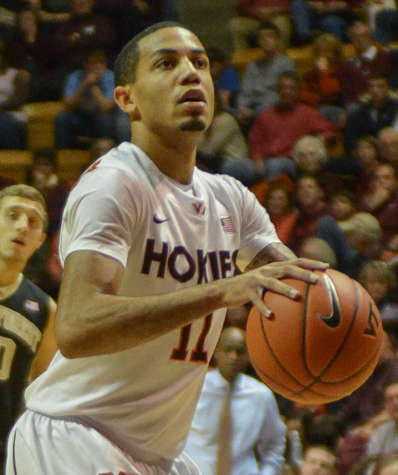
Erick Green, Virginia Tech, 2013

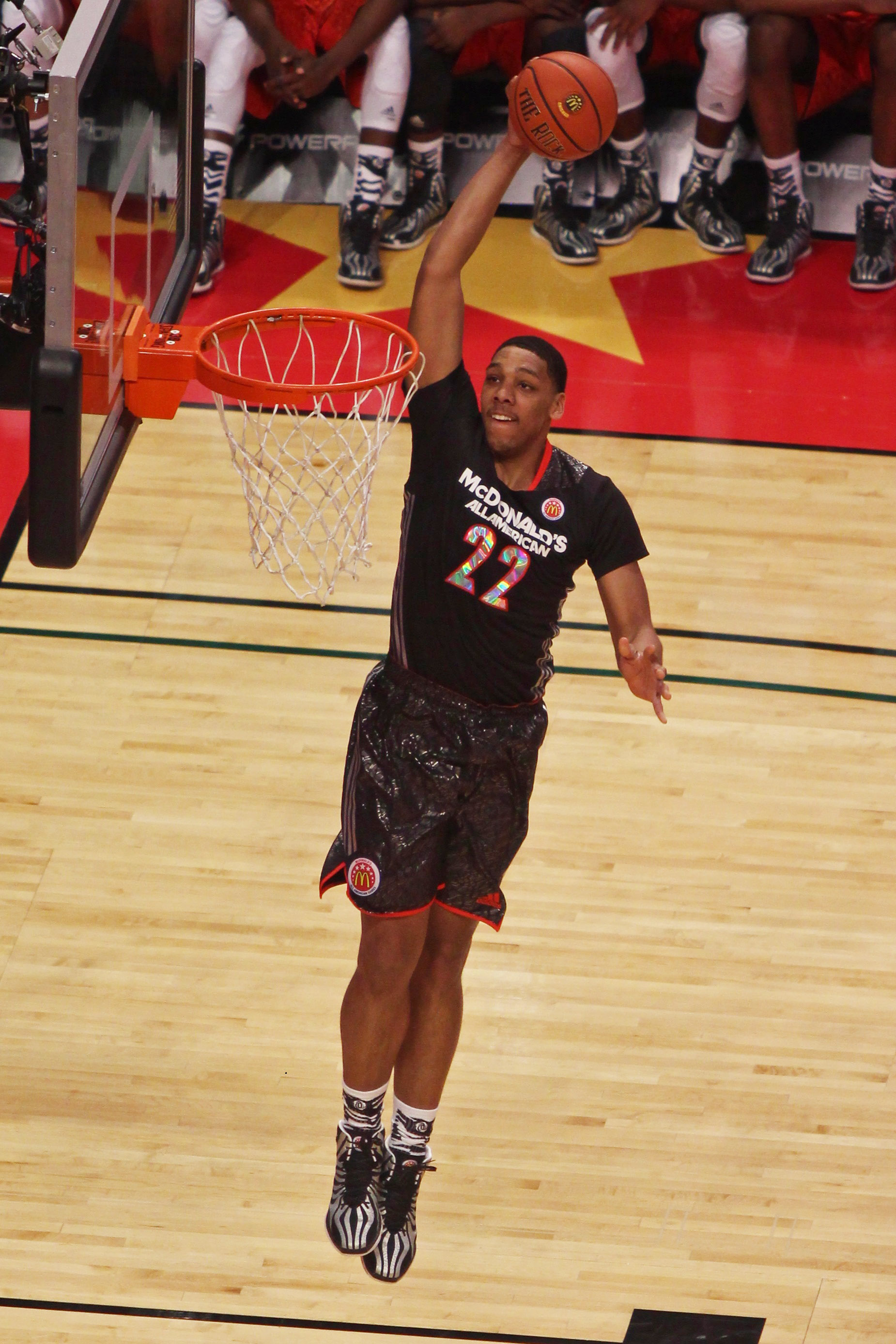
Jahlil Okafor, Duke, 2015

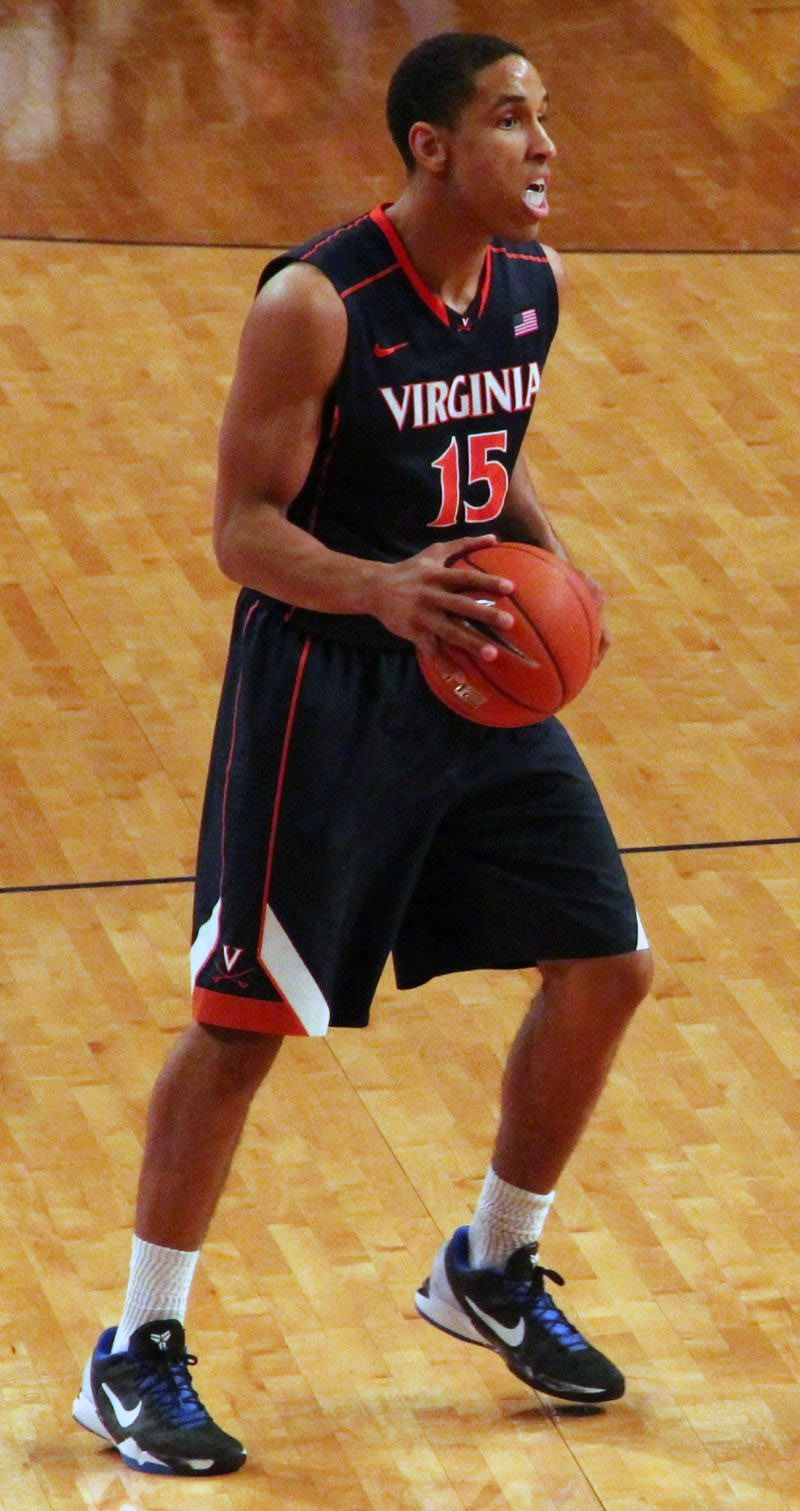
Malcolm Brogdon, Virginia, 2016

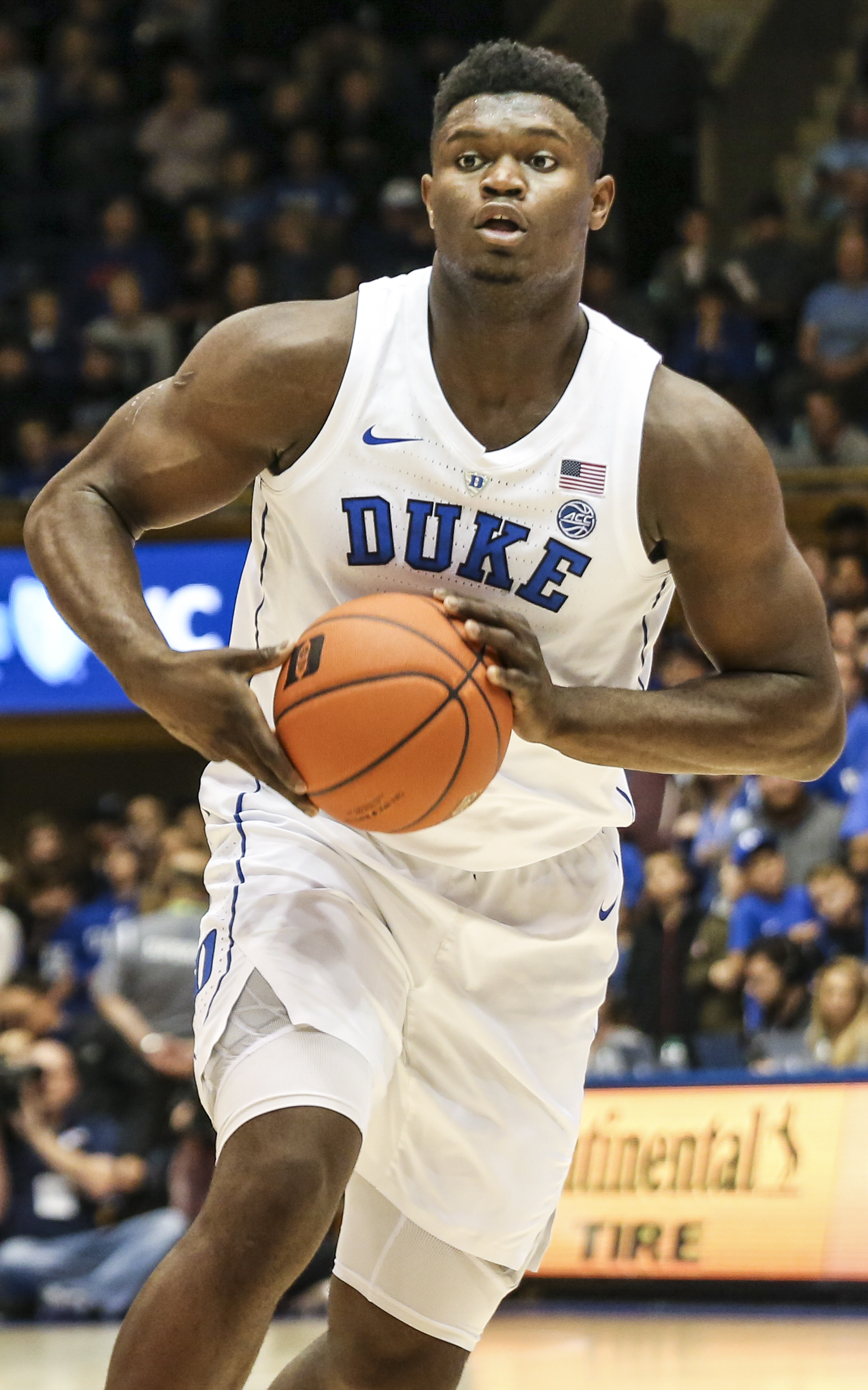
Zion Williamson, Duke, 2019

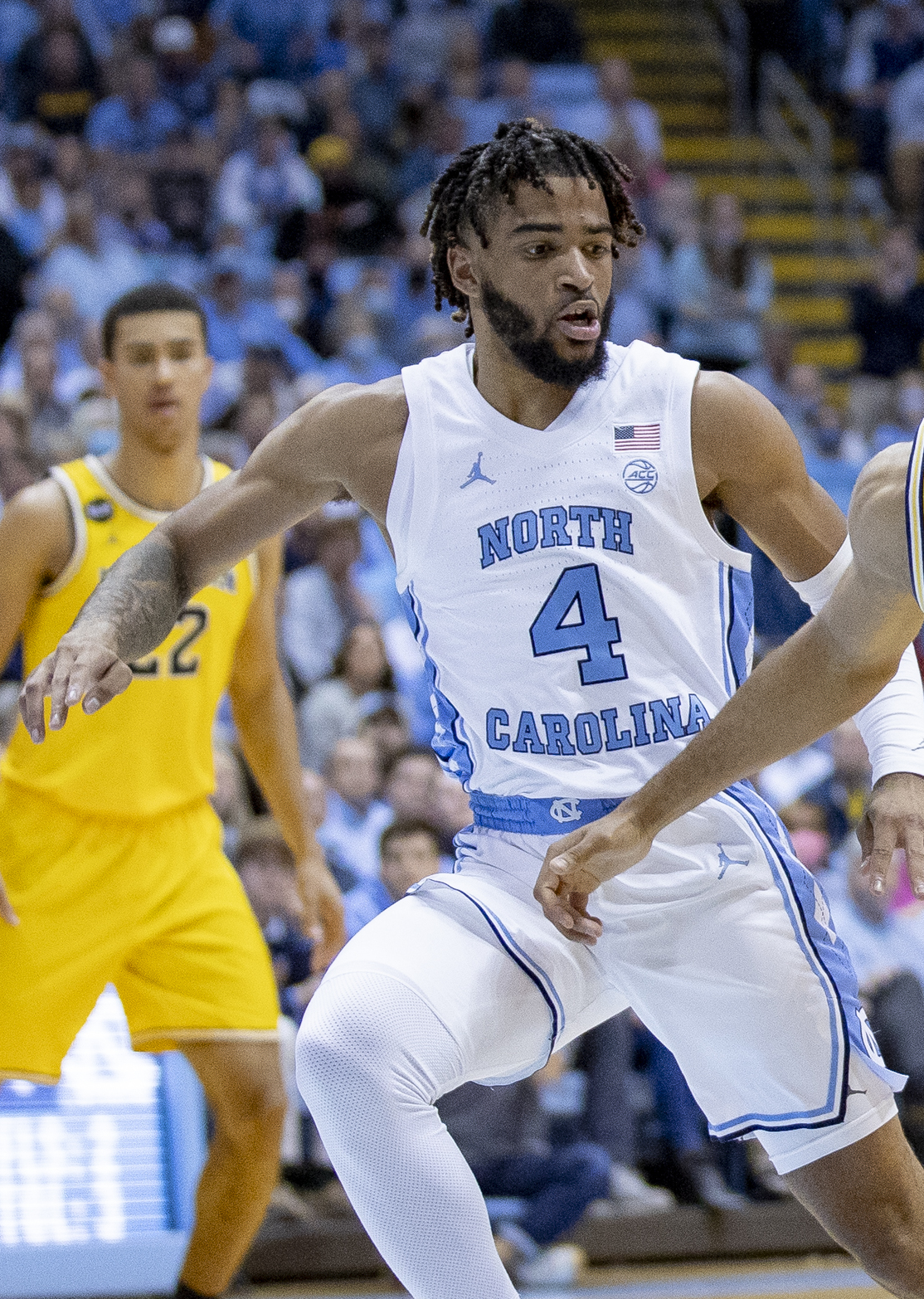
R. J. Davis, North Carolina, 2024

Season	Player	School	Position	Class	Reference
1953–54	Dickie Hemric	Wake Forest	C	Junior	
1954–55	Dickie Hemric (2)	Wake Forest	C	Senior	
1955–56	Ronnie Shavlik	NC State	C	Senior	
1956–57	Lennie Rosenbluth*	North Carolina	PF	Senior	
1957–58	Pete Brennan	North Carolina	SF	Senior	
1958–59	Lou Pucillo	NC State	PG	Senior	
1959–60	Lee Shaffer	North Carolina	PF / C	Senior	
1960–61	Len Chappell	Wake Forest	PF / C	Junior	
1961–62	Len Chappell (2)	Wake Forest	PF / C	Senior	
1962–63	Art Heyman*	Duke	SG / SF	Senior	
1963–64	Jeff Mullins	Duke	SF	Senior	
1964–65	Billy Cunningham	North Carolina	G / F	Senior	
1965–66	Steve Vacendak	Duke	PG	Senior	
1966–67	Larry Miller	North Carolina	SG	Junior	
1967–68	Larry Miller (2)	North Carolina	SG	Senior	
1968–69	John Roche	South Carolina	PG / SG	Sophomore	
1969–70	John Roche (2)	South Carolina	PG / SG	Junior	
1970–71	Charlie Davis	Wake Forest	G	Senior	
1971–72	Barry Parkhill	Virginia	SG	Junior	
1972–73	David Thompson	NC State	SG / SF	Sophomore	
1973–74	David Thompson (2)	NC State	SG / SF	Junior	
1974–75	David Thompson* (3)	NC State	SG / SF	Senior	
1975–76	Mitch Kupchak	North Carolina	PF	Senior	
1976–77	Rod Griffin	Wake Forest	PF	Junior	
1977–78	Phil Ford*	North Carolina	PG	Senior	
1978–79	Mike Gminski	Duke	C	Junior	
1979–80	Albert King	Maryland	G / F	Junior	
1980–81	Ralph Sampson*	Virginia	C	Sophomore	
1981–82	Ralph Sampson* (2)	Virginia	C	Junior	
1982–83	Ralph Sampson* (3)	Virginia	C	Senior	
1983–84	Michael Jordan*	North Carolina	SG	Junior	
1984–85	Len Bias	Maryland	SF	Junior	
1985–86	Len Bias (2)	Maryland	SF	Senior	
1986–87	Horace Grant	Clemson	PF	Senior	
1987–88	Danny Ferry	Duke	C	Junior	
1988–89	Danny Ferry* (2)	Duke	C	Senior	
1989–90	Dennis Scott	Georgia Tech	SF	Junior	
1990–91	Rodney Monroe	NC State	SG	Senior	
1991–92	Christian Laettner*	Duke	C	Senior	
1992–93	Rodney Rogers	Wake Forest	SF	Junior	
1993–94	Grant Hill	Duke	SG / SF	Senior	
1994–95	Joe Smith*	Maryland	PF	Sophomore	
1995–96	Tim Duncan	Wake Forest	C	Junior	
1996–97	Tim Duncan* (2)	Wake Forest	C	Senior	
1997–98	Antawn Jamison*	North Carolina	PF	Junior	
1998–99	Elton Brand*	Duke	C	Sophomore	
1999–00	Chris Carrawell	Duke	SG / SF	Senior	
2000–01^{†}	Shane Battier*	Duke	SF	Senior	
2000–01^{†}	Joseph Forte	North Carolina	SG	Sophomore	
2001–02	Juan Dixon	Maryland	SG	Senior	
2002–03	Josh Howard	Wake Forest	SF	Senior	
2003–04	Julius Hodge	NC State	G/F	Junior	
2004–05	JJ Redick	Duke	SG	Junior	
2005–06	JJ Redick* (2)	Duke	SG	Senior	
2006–07	Jared Dudley	Boston College	SF	Senior	
2007–08	Tyler Hansbrough*	North Carolina	PF	Junior	
2008–09	Ty Lawson	North Carolina	PG	Junior	
2009–10	Greivis Vásquez	Maryland	PG	Senior	
2010–11	Nolan Smith	Duke	PG	Senior	
2011–12	Tyler Zeller	North Carolina	C	Senior	
2012–13^{†}	Erick Green^{M}	Virginia Tech	PG	Senior	
2012–13^{†}	Shane Larkin^{C}	Miami	PG	Sophomore	
2013–14	T. J. Warren	NC State	SF	Sophomore	
2014–15	Jahlil Okafor	Duke	C	Freshman	
2015–16	Malcolm Brogdon	Virginia	SG	Senior	
2016–17	Justin Jackson	North Carolina	SF	Junior	
2017–18	Marvin Bagley III	Duke	PF	Freshman	
2018–19	Zion Williamson*	Duke	PF	Freshman	
2019–20	Tre Jones	Duke	PG	Sophomore	
2020–21	Moses Wright	Georgia Tech	PF	Senior	
2021–22	Alondes Williams	Wake Forest	PG	Graduate	
2022–23	Isaiah Wong	Miami	PG	Senior	
2023–24	R. J. Davis	North Carolina	PG	Senior	
2024–25	Cooper Flagg*	Duke	SG / SF	Freshman	
2025–26	Cameron Boozer*	Duke	PF	Freshman	

== Winners by school ==
School (year joined)	Winners	Years
Duke (1953)	20	1963, 1964, 1966, 1979, 1988, 1989, 1992, 1994, 1999, 2000, 2001^{†}, 2005, 2006, 2011, 2015, 2018, 2019, 2020, 2025, 2026
North Carolina (1953)	16	1957, 1958, 1960, 1965, 1967, 1968, 1976, 1978, 1984, 1998, 2001^{†}, 2008, 2009, 2012, 2017, 2024
Wake Forest (1953)	11	1954, 1955, 1961, 1962, 1971, 1977, 1993, 1996, 1997, 2003, 2022
NC State (1953)	8	1956, 1959, 1973, 1974, 1975, 1991, 2004, 2014
Maryland (1953)^{[a]}	6	1980, 1985, 1986, 1995, 2002, 2010
Virginia (1953)	5	1972, 1981, 1982, 1983, 2016
Georgia Tech (1978)	2	1990, 2021
Miami (2004)	2	2013^{†}, 2023
South Carolina (1953)^{[b]}	2	1969, 1970
Boston College (2005)	1	2007
Clemson (1953)	1	1987
Virginia Tech (2004)	1	2013^{†}
California (2024)	0	—
Florida State (1991)	0	—
Louisville (2014)	0	—
Notre Dame (2013)	0	—
Pittsburgh (2013)	0	—
SMU (2024)	0	—
Stanford (2024)	0	—
Syracuse (2013)	0	—

- ^{a} Maryland left the ACC in 2014 to join the Big Ten Conference.
- ^{b} South Carolina left the ACC in 1971.

== See also ==
- Atlantic Coast Conference Men's Basketball Coach of the Year
- List of All-Atlantic Coast Conference men's basketball teams
