= 1956–57 Duke Blue Devils men's basketball team =

American college basketball season

1956–57 Duke Blue Devils men's basketball
- Conference: Atlantic Coast Conference
- Record: 13–11 (8–6 ACC)
- Head coach: Harold Bradley
- Home arena: Cameron Indoor Stadium

1956–57 ACC men's basketball standings
	Conf.				Overall
Team	W		L	PCT	W		L	PCT
No. 1 North Carolina†	14	–	0	1.000	32	–	0	1.000
Maryland	9	–	5	.643	16	–	10	.615
Duke	8	–	6	.571	13	–	11	.542
No. 18 Wake Forest	7	–	7	.500	19	–	9	.679
NC State	7	–	7	.500	15	–	11	.577
South Carolina	5	–	9	.357	17	–	12	.586
Virginia	3	–	11	.214	6	–	19	.240
Clemson	3	–	11	.214	7	–	17	.292
† 1957 ACC tournament winner Rankings from AP Poll

The 1956–57 Duke Blue Devils men's basketball team represented Duke University in the 1956-57 NCAA Division I men's basketball season. The head coach was Harold Bradley and the team finished the season with an overall record of 13–11.
