= 1953–54 Atlantic Coast Conference men's basketball season =

1953–54 ACC men's basketball standings
	Conf.				Overall
Team	W		L	PCT	W		L	PCT
No. 15 Duke	9	–	1	.900	21	–	6	.778
No. 20 Maryland	7	–	2	.778	23	–	7	.767
Wake Forest	8	–	4	.667	17	–	12	.586
NC State †	5	–	3	.625	26	–	7	.788
North Carolina	5	–	6	.455	11	–	10	.524
South Carolina	2	–	8	.200	10	–	16	.385
Virginia	1	–	4	.200	16	–	11	.593
Clemson	0	–	9	.000	5	–	18	.217
† 1954 ACC tournament winner Rankings from AP Poll

== Player of the year ==
Wake Forest junior center Dickie Hemric

== ACC tournament ==
See 1954 ACC men's basketball tournament

== NCAA tournament ==
=== Round of 24 ===
NC State 75 George Washington 73

=== Regional semi-finals ===
La Salle 88 NC State 81

=== Regional third place ===
NC State 65 Cornell 54

=== Tournament record ===
2-1

== NIT ==
League rules prevented ACC teams from playing in NIT, 1954–1966
