= Dickie Hemric =

American basketball player

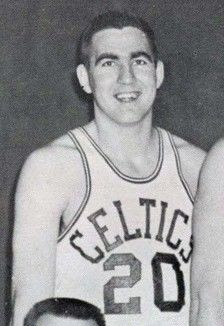

Personal information
- Born: August 29, 1933 Jonesville, North Carolina, U.S.
- Died: August 3, 2017 (aged 83) North Canton, Ohio, U.S.
- Listed height: 6 ft 6 in (1.98 m)
- Listed weight: 220 lb (100 kg)

Career information
- High school: Jonesville (Jonesville, North Carolina)
- College: Wake Forest (1951–1955)
- NBA draft: 1955: 2nd round, 10th overall pick
- Drafted by: Boston Celtics
- Playing career: 1955–1957
- Position: Power forward
- Number: 20

Career history
- 1955–1957: Boston Celtics

Career highlights
- NBA champion (1957); Consensus second-team All-American (1955); Third-team All-American – AP (1954); 2× ACC Player of the Year (1954, 1955); 2× First-team All-ACC (1954, 1955); 2× First-team All-SoCon (1952, 1953); No. 24 retired by Wake Forest Demon Deacons

Career statistics
- Points: 863 (6.3 ppg)
- Rebounds: 703 (5.1 rpg)
- Assists: 102 (0.7 apg)
- Stats at NBA.com
- Stats at Basketball Reference

Ned Dixon "Dickie" Hemric (August 29, 1933 – August 3, 2017) was an American collegiate and professional basketball player for Wake Forest University (1952–1955) and the NBA's Boston Celtics (1955–1957).

Hemric played the first two college years at Wake Forest when the school was a member of the Southern Conference. The Atlantic Coast Conference (ACC) Male Athlete of the Year was created at the start of the 1954 season, and he played his last two seasons in the ACC, setting conference records for scoring and rebounding that were untouched for the first 50 years of the conference's existence. He was honored as the second recipient of the ACC Athlete of the Year in 1955. In 2002 Hemric was selected to the ACC 50th Anniversary men's basketball team, honoring the 50 greatest players in ACC history.

Hemric's ACC scoring record of 2,587 points was untouched from 1956 until it was finally broken in 2006 by Duke University's JJ Redick and in 2009 by Tyler Hansbrough of the University of North Carolina. Hemric held the NCAA record for free throws made in a career with 905 for 54 years until it was passed by Hansbrough. Hemric still holds the Division I record for most free throw attempts (1,359) in a career.

Hemric's ACC record of 1,802 career rebounds may never face a serious challenge - for 40 years the nearest runner-up was his contemporary Ronnie Shavlik who is now third on the list with 1,567 rebounds from 1954 to 1956. Second is legendary NBA power forward Tim Duncan, who recorded 1,570 rebounds at Wake Forest from 1994 to 1997. With most of today's top ACC players leaving for the NBA before completing four seasons, it is difficult to project a scenario in which Hemric's record could be broken. Nationally Hemric is still fifth all-time in Division I career rebounds.

Hemric died on August 3, 2017, at his home in North Canton, Ohio, nearly four weeks shy of his 84th birthday.

== Career statistics ==
Legend
GP	Games played	GS	Games started	MPG	Minutes per game
FG%	Field goal percentage	3P%	3-point field goal percentage	FT%	Free throw percentage
RPG	Rebounds per game	APG	Assists per game	SPG	Steals per game
BPG	Blocks per game	PPG	Points per game	**Bold**	Career high
†	Won an NBA championship

=== NBA ===
==== Regular season ====
Year	Team	GP	MPG	FG%	FT%	RPG	APG	PPG
1955–56	Boston	**71**	**18.7**	**.403**	.648	**5.6**	**.8**	**7.0**
1956–57†	Boston	67	15.7	.344	**.695**	4.5	.6	5.4
Career		138	17.3	.377	.669	5.1	.7	6.3

==== Playoffs ====
Year	Team	GP	MPG	FG%	FT%	RPG	APG	PPG
1956	Boston	**3**	**18.0**	**.208**	**.563**	**7.3**	.3	**6.3**
1957†	Boston	2	9.5	.143	–	4.5	**.5**	1.0
Career		5	14.6	.194	.563	6.2	.4	4.2

== See also ==
- List of NCAA Division I men's basketball career free throw scoring leaders
- List of NCAA Division I men's basketball career rebounding leaders
- List of NCAA Division I men's basketball players with 2000 points and 1000 rebounds
