= Harold Bradley (basketball) =

American college basketball coach

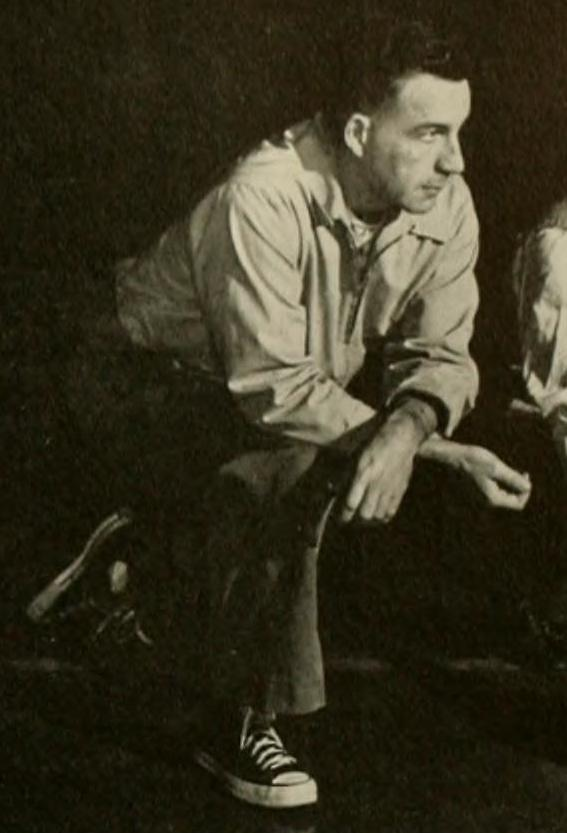
- Bradley coaching Duke, 1951–52

Biographical details
- Born: November 20, 1911
- Died: November 6, 1985 (aged 73)

Coaching career (HC unless noted)
- 1947–1950: Hartwick
- 1950–1959: Duke
- 1959–1967: Texas

Head coaching record
- Overall: 337–169
- Tournaments: 2–4 (NCAA University Division)

Accomplishments and honors

Championships
- 2 ACC regular season (1954, 1958); 3 SWC regular season (1960, 1963, 1965)

Awards
- ACC Coach of the Year (1959)

Harold Bradley (November 20, 1911 – November 6, 1985) was an American college basketball coach. He served as the head basketball coach at Hartwick College (1947–1950), Duke University (1950–1959), and the University of Texas at Austin (1959–1967).

== Early life ==
Bradley graduated from Hartwick College in 1934, where he played baseball and basketball and was a member of Phi Sigma Kappa fraternity.

== Coaching career ==
Bradley coached for three years at Hartwick prior to gaining the head coaching job at Duke.

Bradley coached Duke Blue Devils men's basketball legend Dick Groat during his nine-year tenure with the Blue Devils, which spanned from 1950 to 1959 and resulted in Duke's first NCAA tournament appearance. In nine seasons, his lifetime record at Duke is 167–78.

Bradley was hired as the Texas Longhorns men's basketball coach in 1959 and led the Longhorns to two NCAA Tournaments as a result of winning the Southwest Conference outright twice in eight years. His 1964–65 team also tied for the conference championship.

Bradley's 1960 and 1963 Longhorns teams made the Sweet 16 of the NCAA Division I men's basketball tournament. The 1960 team ended up finishing fourth regionally, while the 1963 squad was third. In eight seasons, his lifetime record at Texas was 125–73.

== Head coaching record ==
Record table
Season	Team	Overall	Conference	Standing	Postseason
Hartwick Hawks (1947–1950)
1947–48	Hartwick	14–8			
1948–49	Hartwick	17–5			
1949–50	Hartwick	16–5			
Hartwick:		47–18 (.723)			
Duke Blue Devils (Southern Conference) (1950–1953)
1950–51	Duke	20–13	13–6	T–4th	
1951–52	Duke	24–6	13–3	3rd	
1952–53	Duke	17–8	12–4	6th	
Duke Blue Devils (Atlantic Coast Conference) (1953–1959)
1953–54	Duke	21–6	9–1	1st	
1954–55	Duke	20–8	11–3	2nd	NCAA first round
1955–56	Duke	19–7	10–4	4th	
1956–57	Duke	13–11	8–6	3rd	
1957–58	Duke	18–7	11–3	1st	
1958–59	Duke	13–12	7–7	T–3rd	
Duke:		165–78 (.679)	94–37 (.718)		
Texas Longhorns (Southwest Conference) (1959–1967)
1959–60	Texas	18–8	11–3	1st	NCAA University Division Regional Fourth Place
1960–61	Texas	14–10	8–6	4th	
1961–62	Texas	16–8	8–6	4th	
1962–63	Texas	20–7	13–1	1st	NCAA University Division Regional Third Place
1963–64	Texas	15–9	8–6	T–3rd	
1964–65	Texas	16–9	10–4	T–1st	
1965–66	Texas	12–12	7–7	T–4th	
1966–67	Texas	14–10	8–6	T–2nd	
Texas:		125–73 (.631)	71–39 (.645)		
Total:		337–169 (.666)			
National champion Postseason invitational champion Conference regular season champion Conference regular season and conference tournament champion Division regular season champion Division regular season and conference tournament champion Conference tournament champion
