= Lennie Rosenbluth =

American basketball player (1933–2022)

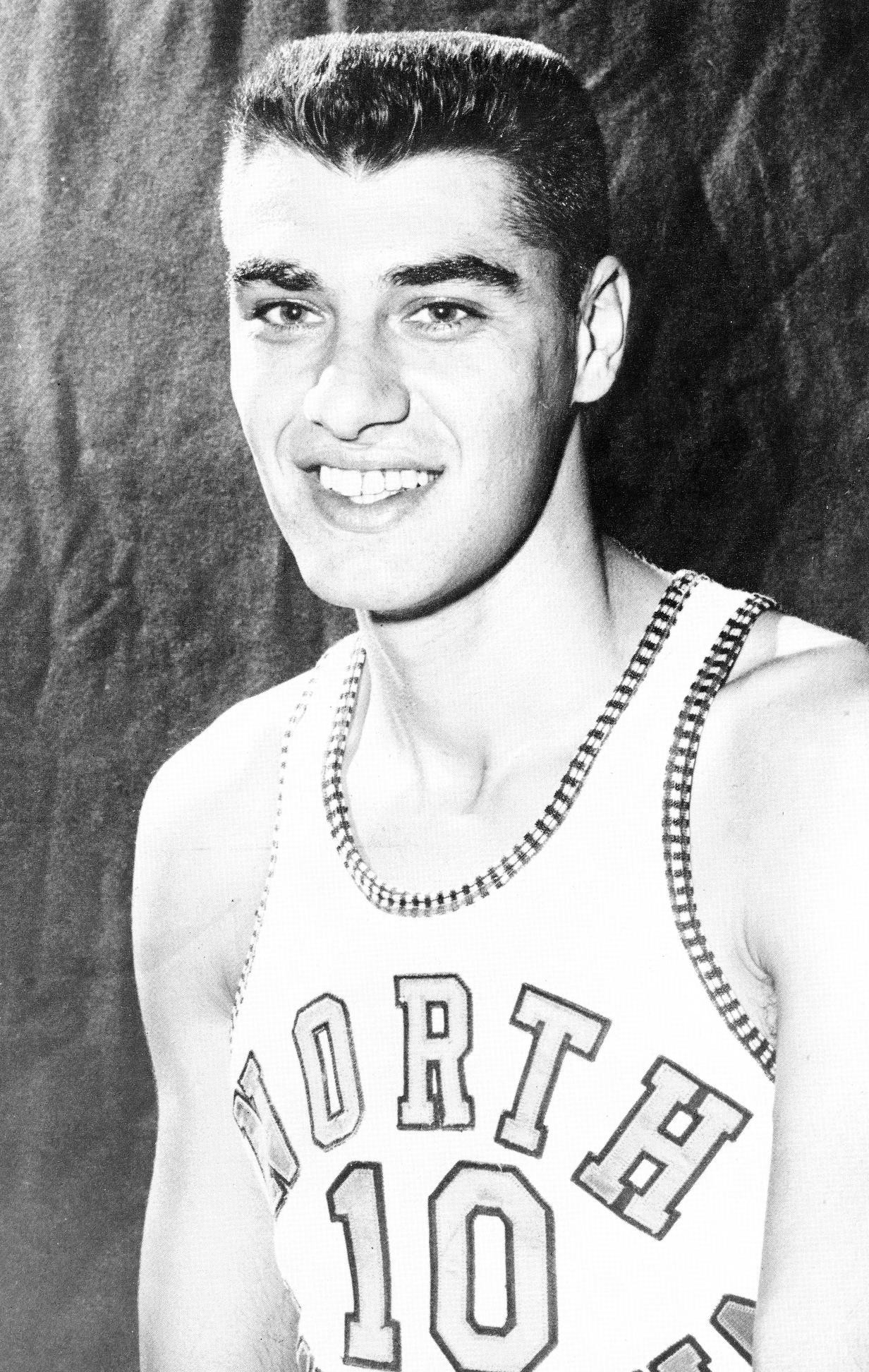
- Rosenbluth circa 1957

Personal information
- Born: January 22, 1933 The Bronx, New York, U.S.
- Died: June 18, 2022 (aged 89) Chapel Hill, North Carolina, U.S.
- Listed height: 6 ft 4 in (1.93 m)
- Listed weight: 190 lb (86 kg)

Career information
- High school: Staunton Military Academy (Staunton, Virginia)
- College: North Carolina (1954–1957)
- NBA draft: 1957: 1st round, 6th overall pick
- Drafted by: Philadelphia Warriors
- Playing career: 1957–1959
- Position: Small forward
- Number: 18

Career history
- 1957–1959: Philadelphia Warriors

Career highlights
- NCAA champion (1957); Helms Foundation Player of the Year (1957); Consensus first-team All-American (1957); Second-team All-American – AP, UPI, INS (1956); Third-team All-American – NEA, Collier's (1956); ACC Player of the Year (1957); 3× First-team All-ACC (1955–1957); No. 10 retired by North Carolina Tar Heels

Career NBA statistics
- Points: 342
- Rebounds: 145
- Assists: 92
- Stats at NBA.com
- Stats at Basketball Reference
- Collegiate Basketball Hall of Fame

Leonard Robert Rosenbluth (January 22, 1933 – June 18, 2022) was an American professional basketball player in the National Basketball Association (NBA), but he is remembered, first and foremost, for his college basketball player days. He played college basketball for the North Carolina Tar Heels, where he was Helms Foundation Player of the Year (1957), consensus first-team All-American (1957), second-team All-American – AP, UPI, INS (1956), third-team All-American – NEA, Collier's (1956), ACC Player of the Year (1957), and 3× first-team All-ACC (1955–1957).

== Early life ==
Rosenbluth was born in the Bronx on January 22, 1933. His family was Jewish. He was the son of Rose (Kaufman) and Jack Rosenbluth. He attended James Monroe High School in the Bronx, and Staunton Military Academy in Staunton, Virginia, for the 1952–53 school year. Rosenbluth played only eight games in high school.

== College career ==
During his first year of varsity basketball at the University of North Carolina at Chapel Hill in 1955, Rosenbluth was the Tar Heels' leading scorer. He was named third team All-America, averaging 25.5 points per game (PPG) and 11.7 rebounds. He later achieved All-America honors during his sophomore year, but this time they were split between various first and second team selections. He again led the Tar Heels in scoring with a 26.7 average.

In his senior season in 1957, Rosenbluth averaged 27.9 points and 8.6 rebounds per game while leading the Tar Heels to a 32–0 record. His regular season performance earned him the Helms Hall of Fame "Collegiate Player of the Year" designation over the University of Kansas's Wilt Chamberlain. The Tar Heels went on to defeat Chamberlain's Jayhawks 54–53 in triple overtime for the NCAA Basketball Championship, North Carolina's first, which brought credibility to the fledgling Atlantic Coast Conference. Rosenbluth's scored 20 points in the championship final, was the tournament's overall top scorer at 28.0 ppg, and was named to the All-Tournament Team. He was also named the ACC Player of the Year and ACC Male Athlete of the Year.

Rosenbluth was honored for his athletic achievements while at North Carolina. His No. 10 was retired by the Tar Heels. He was named to the ACC 50th Anniversary men's basketball team in 2002, as one of the 50 greatest players in Atlantic Coast Conference history. He was also selected to the "All-Decade Final Four" team for the 1950s. He was inducted into the Helms College Basketball Hall of Fame and was a member of the International Jewish Sports Hall of Fame.

He also competed in the Maccabiah Games in Israel, before his pro career.

=== Other honors ===
Rosenbluth also received a number of other accolades and awards during his playing career:

- Three-time All-ACC selections (1955–57)
- 1957 ACC Player and Athlete of the Year
- MVP of the '57 ACC Tournament
- All-Tournament at three Dixie Classics

Until 1992, Rosenbluth was the only collegian to be named NCAA National Player of the Year, ACC Player of the Year, ACC Tournament MVP, and NCAA regional MVP in the same season. His feat has since been matched by Christian Laettner of Duke University and UNC's Antawn Jamison.

Rosenbluth held several UNC records at the time of his death, including most points in a single season (897), and highest single-season average (28.0).

== Professional career ==
Rosenbluth was selected in the first round (6th overall selection) of the 1957 NBA draft by the Philadelphia Warriors. He made his NBA debut with the franchise on October 25, 1957, playing six minutes and scoring a two-point field goal against the Syracuse Nationals. He ultimately played in 82 games for the Warriors, and made his final appearance in the NBA on February 11, 1959. Throughout his two seasons in the NBA, Rosenbluth averaged 4.2 PPG and 1.8 rebounds per game.

== Later life ==
After retiring from professional basketball, Rosenbluth worked as a high school teacher and coach in Florida. He eventually moved back to Chapel Hill, North Carolina, just over a decade before his death.

Rosenbluth died on June 18, 2022, at the age of 89.

== Career statistics ==
Legend
| GP | Games played | GS | Games started | MPG | Minutes per game |
| FG% | Field goal percentage | 3P% | 3-point field goal percentage | FT% | Free throw percentage |
| RPG | Rebounds per game | APG | Assists per game | SPG | Steals per game |
| BPG | Blocks per game | PPG | Points per game | **Bold** | Career high |

=== NBA ===
==== Regular season ====
| Year | Team | GP | MPG | FG% | FT% | RPG | APG | PPG |
|---|---|---|---|---|---|---|---|---|
| 1957–58 | Philadelphia | **53** | 7.0 | **.343** | .631 | 1.7 | **.4** | **4.4** |
| 1958–59 | Philadelphia | 29 | **7.1** | .297 | **.724** | **1.9** | .2 | 3.7 |
| Career | | 82 | 7.0 | .327 | .655 | 1.8 | .4 | 4.2 |

==== Playoffs ====
| Year | Team | GP | MPG | FG% | FT% | RPG | APG | PPG |
|---|---|---|---|---|---|---|---|---|
| 1958 | Philadelphia | 4 | 2.8 | .333 | .667 | .8 | .0 | 2.0 |

== See also ==
- List of select Jewish basketball players
- List of All-Atlantic Coast Conference men's basketball teams
