= 1956–57 Atlantic Coast Conference men's basketball season =

The following contains a list of games within the 1956-57 season.

== Final standings ==
Team	ACC Regular Season	Regular season %	All Games	All Games %	Nonconference Games	Ranked AP All	Ranked AP Nonconference
North Carolina	14–0	1.000	32–0	1.000			
Maryland	9–5	.643	16–10	.615			
Duke	8–6	.571	13–11	.542			
Wake Forest	7–7	.500	19–9	.679			
NC State	7–7	.500	15–11	.577			
South Carolina	5–9	.357	17–12	.586			
Clemson	3–11	.214	7–17	.292			
Virginia	3–11	.214	6–19	.240			
Total			125–89	.584			

== ACC tournament ==
See 1957 ACC men's basketball tournament

== NCAA tournament ==
=== Round of 23 ===
North Carolina 90, Yale 74

=== Regional semi-finals ===
North Carolina 87, Canisius 75

=== Regional final ===
North Carolina 67, Syracuse 58

=== National semi-finals ===
North Carolina 74, Michigan St 70 (3ot)

=== National championship ===
North Carolina 54, Kansas 53 (3ot)

=== ACC's NCAA record ===
6–0

== NIT ==
League rules prevented ACC teams from playing in the NIT, 1954–1966
