= List of Michigan State Spartans men's basketball head coaches =

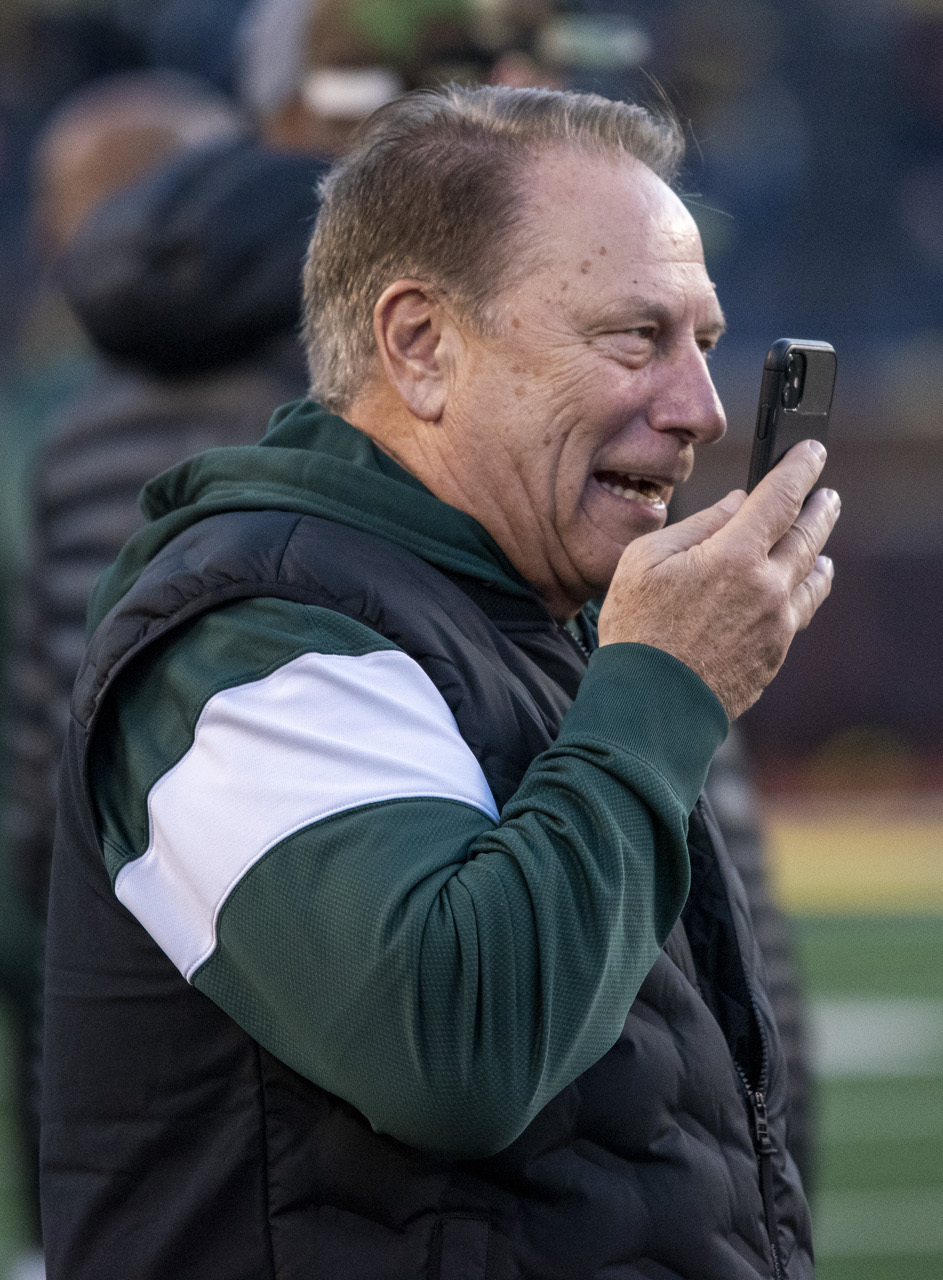
Tom Izzo, the current head coach of the Michigan State Spartans, and the winningest head coach in Spartans men's basketball history.

The following is a list of Michigan State Spartans men's basketball head coaches. There have been 16 head coaches of the Spartans in their 124-season history.

Michigan State's current head coach is Tom Izzo. He took over as the Spartans' head coach in March 1995, replacing Jud Heathcote, who retired after the 1994–95 season.

No.	Tenure	Coach	Years	Record	Pct.
–	1898–1899	No coach	1	0–2	.000
1	1899–1901	Charles Bemies	2	5–2	.714
2	1901–1903	George Denman	2	11–0	1.000
3	1903–1910	Chester Brewer	7	70–25	.737
4	1910–1916	John Macklin	6	48–38	.558
5	1916–1920	George Gauthier	4	41–38	.519
6	1920–1922	Lyman Frimodig	2	30–22	.577
7	1922–1924	Mysterious Walker	2	20–19	.513
8	1924–1926	John Kobs	2	11–26	.297
9	1926–1949 (Note: Michigan State did not field a team for the 1943–44 season due to World War II.)	Benjamin Van Alstyne	22	231–163	.586
10	1949–1950	Al Kircher	1	4–18	.182
11	1950–1954	Pete Newell	4	45–42	.517
12	1954–1965	Forddy Anderson	11	125–124	.502
13	1965–1969	John Benington	4	54–38	.587
14	1969–1976	Gus Ganakas	7	89–84	.514
15	1976–1995	Jud Heathcote	19	340–220	.607
16	1995–present	Tom Izzo	28	687–280	.710
Totals		16 coaches	124 seasons	1,811–1,141	.613
Records updated through end of 2022–23 season Source
