= List of Michigan State Spartans men's basketball seasons =

This is a list of seasons completed by the Michigan State Spartans men's college basketball team.

== History ==
Overall
Years of basketball	127
First season	1898
Head coaches (all-time)	15
All games
All-time record	1888–1170 (.617)
20+ win seasons	32 (Izzo 25, Heathcote 7)
30+ win seasons	6 (Izzo 6)
Home games
Breslin Center	476–72 (.869)
Jenison Fieldhouse	385–184 (.677)
Demonstration Hall/College Gymnasium/Other	262–93 (.738)
Big Ten games
All Time Big Ten Regular Season Record	729–542 (.574)
All Time Big Ten tournament Record	36–22 (.621)
Conference Regular Season Championships	17 (1957, 1959, 1967, 1978, 1979, 1990, 1998, 1999, 2000, 2001, 2009, 2010, 2012, 2018, 2019, 2020, 2025)
Conference tournament championships	6 (1999, 2000, 2012, 2014, 2016, 2019)
NCAA tournament
NCAA Appearances	39 (1957, 1959, 1978, 1979, 1985, 1986, 1990, 1991, 1992, 1994, 1995, 1998, 1999, 2000, 2001, 2002, 2003, 2004, 2005, 2006, 2007, 2008, 2009, 2010, 2011, 2012, 2013, 2014, 2015, 2016, 2017, 2018, 2019, 2021, 2022, 2023, 2024, 2025, 2026)
NCAA Tournament record	77–36 (.681)
Sweet Sixteen	23 (1957, 1959, 1978, 1979, 1986, 1990, 1998, 1999, 2000, 2001, 2003, 2005, 2008, 2009, 2010, 2012, 2013, 2014, 2015, 2019, 2023, 2025, 2026)
Elite Eight	15 (1957, 1959, 1978, 1979, 1999, 2000, 2001, 2003, 2005, 2009, 2010, 2014, 2015, 2019, 2025)
Final Four	10 (1957, 1979, 1999, 2000, 2001, 2005, 2009, 2010, 2015, 2019)
NCAA Championship Games	3 (1979, 2000, 2009)
NCAA Championships	2 (1979, 2000)
Accurate as of April 23, 2026 Source

== Season-by-season results ==
Record table
Season	Team	Overall	Conference	Standing	Postseason
No Coach (Independent) (1898–1899)
1898–99	No Coach	0–2			
Charles Bemies (Independent) (1899–1901)
1899–1900	Charles Bemies	2–2			
1900–01	Charles Bemies	3–0			
Charles Bemies:		5–2 (.714)			
George Denman (Independent) (1901–1902)
1901–02	George Denman	5–0			
1902–03	George Denman	6–0			
George Denman:		11–0 (1.000)			
Chester Brewer (Independent) (1903–1910)
1903–04	Chester Brewer	5–3			
1904–05	Chester Brewer	5–3			
1905–06	Chester Brewer	11–2			
1906–07	Chester Brewer	14–2			
1907–08	Chester Brewer	15–5			
1908–09	Chester Brewer	10–5			
1909–10	Chester Brewer	10–5			
Chester Brewer:		70–25 (.737)			
John Macklin (Independent) (1910–1916)
1910–11	John Macklin	5–9			
1911–12	John Macklin	12–3			
1912–13	John Macklin	8–5			
1913–14	John Macklin	8–4			
1914–15	John Macklin	7–9			
1915–16	John Macklin	8–8			
John Macklin:		48–38 (.558)			
George Gauthier (Independent) (1916–1920)
1916–17	George Gauthier	11–5			
1917–18	George Gauthier	6–10			
1918–19	George Gauthier	9–9			
1919–20	George Gauthier; Lyman Frimodig	21–15^{[Note A]}			
George Gauthier:		41–38 (.519)			
Lyman Frimodig (Independent) (1920–1922)
1920–21	Lyman Frimodig	13–8			
1921–22	Lyman Frimodig	11–13			
Lyman Frimodig:		30–22 (.577)			
Fred Walker (Independent) (1922–1924)
1922–23	Fred Walker	10–9			
1923–24	Fred Walker	10–10			
Fred Walker:		20–19 (.513)			
John H. Kobs (Independent) (1924–1926)
1924–25	John H. Kobs	6–13			
1925–26	John H. Kobs	5–13			
John H. Kobs:		11–26 (.297)			
Benjamin Van Alstyne (Independent) (1926–1949)
1926–27	Benjamin Van Alstyne	7–11			
1927–28	Benjamin Van Alstyne	11–4			
1928–29	Benjamin Van Alstyne	11–5			
1929–30	Benjamin Van Alstyne	12–4			
1930–31	Benjamin Van Alstyne	16–1			
1931–32	Benjamin Van Alstyne	12–5			
1932–33	Benjamin Van Alstyne	10–7			
1933–34	Benjamin Van Alstyne	12–5			
1934–35	Benjamin Van Alstyne	14–4			
1935–36	Benjamin Van Alstyne	8–9			
1936–37	Benjamin Van Alstyne	5–12			
1937–38	Benjamin Van Alstyne	9–8			
1938–39	Benjamin Van Alstyne	9–8			
1939–40	Benjamin Van Alstyne	14–6			
1940–41	Benjamin Van Alstyne	11–6			
1941–42	Benjamin Van Alstyne	15–6			
1942–43	Benjamin Van Alstyne	2–14			
1943–44	Benjamin Van Alstyne	*** No Basketball	due to World	War II ***	
1944–45	Benjamin Van Alstyne	9–7			
1945–46	Benjamin Van Alstyne	12–9			
1946–47	Benjamin Van Alstyne	11–10			
1947–48	Benjamin Van Alstyne	12–10			
1948–49	Benjamin Van Alstyne	9–12			
Benjamin Van Alstyne:		231–163 (.586)			
Alton Kircher (Independent) (1949–1950)
1949–50	Alton Kircher	4–18			
Alton Kircher:		4–18 (.182)			
Pete Newell (Big Ten Conference) (1950–1954)
1950–51	Pete Newell	10–11	5–9	7th	
1951–52	Pete Newell	13–9	6–8	5th	
1952–53	Pete Newell	13–9	11–7	T–3rd	
1953–54	Pete Newell	9–13	4–10	8th	
Pete Newell:		45–42 (.517)	26–17 (.605)		
Forrest "Forddy" Anderson (Big Ten Conference) (1954–1965)
1954–55	Forddy Anderson	13–9	8–6	4th	
1955–56	Forddy Anderson	13–9	7–7	5th	
1956–57	Forddy Anderson	16–10	10–4	T–4th	NCAA University Division Final Four
1957–58	Forddy Anderson	16–6	9–5	T–2nd	
1958–59	Forddy Anderson	19–4	12–2	1st	NCAA University Division Elite Eight
1959–60	Forddy Anderson	10–11	5–9	8th	
1960–61	Forddy Anderson	7–17	3–11	9th	
1961–62	Forddy Anderson	8–14	3–11	T–9th	
1962–63	Forddy Anderson	4–16	3–11	9th	
1963–64	Forddy Anderson	14–10	8–6	T–4th	
1964–65	Forddy Anderson	5–18	1–13	10th	
Forddy Anderson:		125–124 (.502)	69–85 (.448)		
John E. Benington (Big Ten Conference) (1965–1969)
1965–66	John E. Benington	15–7	10–4	2nd	
1966–67	John E. Benington	16–7	10–4	T–1st	
1967–68	John E. Benington	12–12	6–8	T–6th	
1968–69	John E. Benington	11–12	6–8	T–5th	
John E. Benington:		54–38 (.587)	32–24 (.571)		
Gus Ganakas (Big Ten Conference) (1969–1976)
1969–70	Gus Ganakas	9–15	5–9	T–6th	
1970–71	Gus Ganakas	10–14	4–10	T–7th	
1971–72	Gus Ganakas	13–11	6–8	T-5th	
1972–73	Gus Ganakas	13–11	6–8	T–6th	
1973–74	Gus Ganakas	13–11	8–6	T–4th	
1974–75	Gus Ganakas	17–9	10–8	5th	
1975–76	Gus Ganakas	14–13	10–8	4th	
Gus Ganakas:		89–84 (.514)	45–57 (.441)		
Jud Heathcote (Big Ten Conference) (1976–1995)
1976–77	Jud Heathcote	10–17^{[Note B]}	7–11^{[Note B]}	6th	
1977–78	Jud Heathcote	25–5	15–3	1st	NCAA Elite Eight
1978–79	Jud Heathcote	26–6	13–5	1st	NCAA champion
1979–80	Jud Heathcote	12–15	6–12	8th	
1980–81	Jud Heathcote	13–14	7–11	8th	
1981–82	Jud Heathcote	11–17^{[Note C]}	6–12^{[Note C]}	T–7th	
1982–83	Jud Heathcote	17–13	9–9	T–6th	NIT second round
1983–84	Jud Heathcote	15–13^{[Note C]}	8–10^{[Note C]}	5th	
1984–85	Jud Heathcote	19–10	10–8	T–5th	NCAA first round
1985–86	Jud Heathcote	23–8	12–6	3rd	NCAA Sweet Sixteen
1986–87	Jud Heathcote	11–17	6–12	7th	
1987–88	Jud Heathcote	10–18	5–13	8th	
1988–89	Jud Heathcote	18–15	6–12	T–8th	NIT Fourth Place
1989–90	Jud Heathcote	28–6	15–3	1st	NCAA Sweet Sixteen
1990–91	Jud Heathcote	19–11	11–7	T–3rd	NCAA second round
1991–92	Jud Heathcote	22–8	11–7	T–3rd	NCAA second round
1992–93	Jud Heathcote	15–13	7–11	T–8th	NIT first round
1993–94	Jud Heathcote	20–12	10–8	T–4th	NCAA second round
1994–95	Jud Heathcote	22–6	14–4	2nd	NCAA first round
Jud Heathcote:		340–220 (.607)	182–160 (.532)		
Tom Izzo (Big Ten Conference) (1995–present)
1995–96	Tom Izzo	16–16	9–9	7th	NIT second round
1996–97	Tom Izzo	17–12	9–9	T–6th	NIT second round
1997–98	Tom Izzo	22–8	13–3	T–1st	NCAA Sweet Sixteen
1998–99	Tom Izzo	33–5	15–1	1st	NCAA Final Four
1999–2000	Tom Izzo	32–7	13–3	T–1st	NCAA champion
2000–01	Tom Izzo	28–5	13–3	T–1st	NCAA Final Four
2001–02	Tom Izzo	19–12	10–6	5th	NCAA first round
2002–03	Tom Izzo	22–13	10–6	T–3rd	NCAA Elite Eight
2003–04	Tom Izzo	18–12	12–4	T–2nd	NCAA first round
2004–05	Tom Izzo	26–7	13–3	2nd	NCAA Final Four
2005–06	Tom Izzo	22–12	8–8	T–6th	NCAA first round
2006–07	Tom Izzo	23–12	8–8	T–7th	NCAA second round
2007–08	Tom Izzo	27–9	12–6	4th	NCAA Sweet Sixteen
2008–09	Tom Izzo	31–7	15–3	1st	NCAA Runner-up
2009–10	Tom Izzo	28–9	14–4	T–1st	NCAA Final Four
2010–11	Tom Izzo	19–15	9–9	T–4th	NCAA second round
2011–12	Tom Izzo	29–8	13–5	T–1st	NCAA Sweet Sixteen
2012–13	Tom Izzo	27–9	13–5	T–2nd	NCAA Sweet Sixteen
2013–14	Tom Izzo	29–9	12–6	T–2nd	NCAA Elite Eight
2014–15	Tom Izzo	27–12	12–6	T–3rd	NCAA Final Four
2015–16	Tom Izzo	29–6	13–5	2nd	NCAA first round
2016–17	Tom Izzo	20–15	10–8	T–5th	NCAA second round
2017–18	Tom Izzo	30–5	16–2	1st	NCAA second round
2018–19	Tom Izzo	32–7	16–4	T–1st	NCAA Final Four
2019–20	Tom Izzo	22–9	14–6	T–1st	No postseason due to COVID-19 pandemic
2020–21	Tom Izzo	15–13	9–11	T–8th	NCAA First Four
2021–22	Tom Izzo	23–13	11–9	T–7th	NCAA second round
2022–23	Tom Izzo	21–13	11–8	4th	NCAA Sweet Sixteen
2023–24	Tom Izzo	20–15	10–10	T–6th	NCAA second round
2024–25	Tom Izzo	30–7	17–3	1st	NCAA Elite Eight
2025–26	Tom Izzo	27–8	15–5	T–2nd	NCAA Sweet Sixteen
Tom Izzo:		764–310 (.711)	375–178 (.678)		
Total:		1,888–1,170 (.617)			
National champion Postseason invitational champion Conference regular season champion Conference regular season and conference tournament champion Division regular season champion Division regular season and conference tournament champion Conference tournament champion

Updated through March 12, 2026

^A. George Gauthier left after 29 games in 1919–20, posting a 15–14 record. Lyman Frimodig coached the final seven games of the season, finishing 6–1.
^B. Due to forfeits related to NCAA sanctions to Minnesota for improper selling of tickets, MSU's official record for the 1976–77 season is 12–15, 9–9 though they finished the season 10–17, 7–11.
^C. Due to NCAA sanctions against Wisconsin for providing improper benefits for players, MSU's official record for the 1981–82 season is 12–16, 7–11 though they finished the season 11–17, 6–12. The official record for the 1983–84 season is 16–12, 9–9 though they finished the season 15–13, 8–10
