= Matt Aitch =

American basketball player (1944–2007)

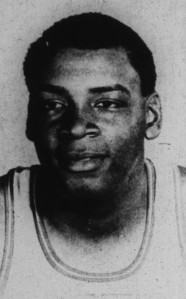
- Aitch, c. 1967

Personal information
- Born: September 21, 1944 St. Louis, Missouri, U.S.
- Died: April 4, 2007 (aged 62) Lansing, Michigan, U.S.
- Listed height: 6 ft 7 in (2.01 m)
- Listed weight: 230 lb (104 kg)

Career information
- High school: Maplewood Richmond Heights (Maplewood, Missouri)
- College: Moberly Area CC (1963–1965); Michigan State (1965–1967)
- NBA draft: 1967: 13th round, 135th overall pick
- Drafted by: Detroit Pistons
- Playing career: 1967–1968
- Position: Power forward
- Number: 45

Career history
- 1967–1968: Indiana Pacers

Career highlights
- Second-team All-Big Ten (1967)
- Stats at Basketball Reference

Matthew Alexander Aitch Jr. (September 21, 1944 – April 4, 2007) was an American professional basketball player who played one season in the American Basketball Association (ABA).

== Early life ==
Aitch was born in St. Louis, Missouri, to parents Matthew Sr. and Viola (née Kinder) Aitch. He attended Maplewood Richmond Heights High School in Maplewood, Missouri, where he led the team to three straight conference championships as a 6 ft 4 in (1.93 m) center.

== College career ==
Aitch was not academically eligible to play NCAA Division I basketball so he enrolled at Moberly Junior College where he played for two seasons and grew to 6 ft 7 in (2.01 m). John Benington, the head coach for the Saint Louis Billikens, had recruited Aitch as a high school student and received notice from a Moberly instructor that Aitch had improved his grades and could enrol. He had not committed to a school when Benington was appointed as head coach of the Michigan State Spartans and was convinced to follow him there. Aitch averaged 16.3 points and 9.2 rebounds per game during his senior season with the Spartans in 1966–67 and was selected to the All-Big Ten Conference second team. He was team captain when the Spartans won the Big Ten Conference championship in 1967.

== Professional career ==
Aitch was selected by the Detroit Pistons as the 135th overall pick of the 1967 NBA draft. He was also selected as the first ever pick by the Dallas Chaparrals, who now exist as the San Antonio Spurs, in the inaugural 1967 American Basketball Association draft (though it was later revealed by then-team manager Max Williams that Aitch wasn't intended to be their first ever draft pick due to the team's original co-owner, Roland Speth (who later became the manager of The Monkees band), mistaking Williams' draft listing that he did in alphabetical order (with last names going from A-Z) as a list for the best possible talents being taken at hand as early as they could have done so). However, he wouldn't play for either team and instead played for the Indiana Pacers of the American Basketball Association (ABA) during the 1967–68 season, averaging 5.6 points and 3.6 rebounds per game there.

== Personal life ==
Aitch chose to stay in Lansing, Michigan, after his graduation because he liked the area when he attended Michigan State University. He served as an assistant coach and recruiter for the Michigan State Spartans. Aitch also worked as a minority recruiter for Michigan State University and Central Michigan University. He later worked in management for a Meijer distribution center.

Aitch's daughter, Lauren, played college basketball for the Michigan State Spartans women's team. She started a foundation in memory of her father called The Aitch Foundation which focuses on cancer detection research.

Aitch died on April 4, 2007, at the age of 62.
