= George Gauthier (American football) =

American football player and coach, basketball coach, college athletics administrator

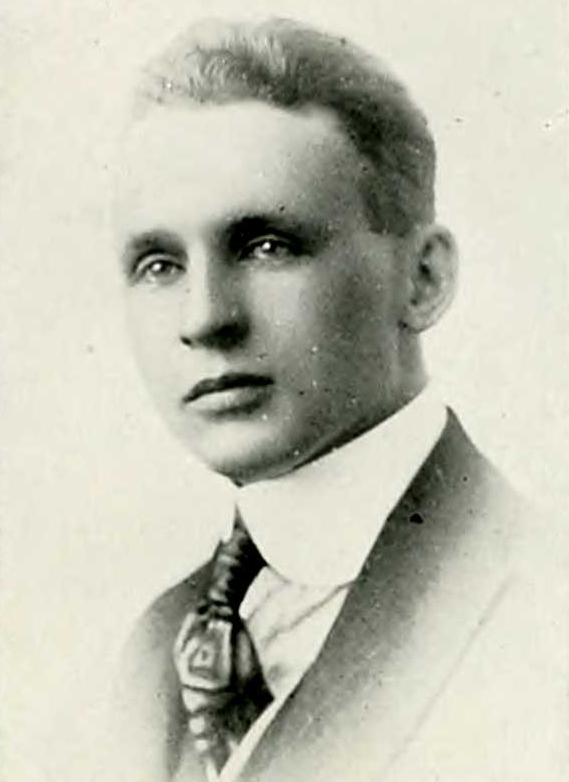

Biographical details
- Born: February 3, 1890
- Died: August 11, 1964 (aged 74); Blind River, Ontario, Canada

Playing career
- 1911–1914: Michigan Agricultural
- Position: Quarterback

Coaching career (HC unless noted)

Football
- 1915–1917: Michigan Agricultural (assistant)
- 1918: Michigan Agricultural
- 1921–1946: Ohio Wesleyan

Basketball
- 1916–1920: Michigan Agricultural
- 1945–1946: Ohio Wesleyan

Head coaching record
- Overall: 125–101–15 (football); 47–46 (basketball)

Accomplishments and honors

Championships
- Football; 2 OAC (1922, 1925); 2 Buckeye (1926, 1928)

George E. "Gooch" Gauthier (February 3, 1890 – August 11, 1964) was an American football and basketball player, athletic coach, and college athletics administrator. He served as the head football coach at Michigan Agricultural College, now Michigan State University, in 1918 and at Ohio Wesleyan University from 1921 to 1946, compiling a career record of 125–101–15. Gauthier was also the head basketball coach at Michigan Agricultural from 1916 to 1920 and at Ohio Wesleyan for the 1945–1946 season, tallying a career mark of 47–46.

== Athlete at Michigan State ==
A native of Detroit, Gauthier played both basketball and football for Michigan Agricultural College between 1911 and 1914. While attending the school, "Gauthier peeled three bushels of potatotes daily to pay for his meals and delivered laundry for expense money." He was also president of the student council as a senior. He was the starting quarterback for the school's football team in 1912 and 1913 and led the team to upset victories over Ohio State in 1912 and Michigan in 1913. In the 1912 game against Ohio State, the Aggies trailed 20–0 at halftime but scored 32 points in the second half, including two scores by Gauthier, to win the game, 32–20. Years later, Gauthier described the victory over Michigan as his first great thrill:

"My mind goes back to 1913, when Michigan State's team — a little band of agriculture students — journeyed to Ann Arbor to meet mighty Michigan. I was the 130-pound quarterback, cocky and confident we could beat the Wolverines. I insisted my mother come over from Detroit to see the game, her first football contest. We won the game 12–7 and my mother became a football fan to provide my first big thrill."

The 12–7 win over the Wolverines marked the first victory by a Michigan State team in the long Michigan-Michigan State rivalry and ruined Michigan's unbeaten season. The 1912 and 1913 football teams with Gauthier as quarterback won 14 games and lost only one game. Gauthier later recalled, "I played two years at quarterback, never missed a minute of play, and never played in a losing game."

== Coach at Michigan State ==
After graduating from M.A.C. in 1914, Gauthier remained in East Lansing as an assistant athletic director for six years. He was an assistant football coach under John Macklin from 1915 to 1917, and became the head football coach in 1918, compiling a record of 4–3. The biggest victory in his single season as head football coach was a 12–9 decision over Knute Rockne's Notre Dame team. Gauthier was also the head basketball coach at Michigan Agricultural from 1916 to 1920, tallying a record of 38–35.

== Coach and athletic director at Ohio Wesleyan ==
Gauthier served as the head football coach at Ohio Wesleyan University for 26 years from 1921 to 1946 and compiled a record of 121–98–15. He coached the Ohio Wesleyan football team to a 17–7 win over the Michigan Wolverines in the opening game of the 1928 college football season, marking the first loss by Michigan in a season opener since 1883. The 1928 victory over Michigan was also the first game played in the newly constructed Michigan Stadium. Gauthier later described the victory over Michigan as the greatest thrill of his career:

"No one who was there will ever forget — that little band of Battling Bishops against the mighty Wolves. A special train-load of faculty, alumni and students went along for the dedication game. We were nervous in the unfinished dressing rooms. With a half-hour to go to game time someone started singing, and soon the locker room rang with close harmony college songs. We were relaxed, and we were ready. After the first few minutes, a player coming off the field told me: 'They're not too tough, coach. We can take them.'"

Gauthier also served as Ohio Wesleyan's athletic director for 34 years from 1921 to 1955. He also served as the men's track & field coach from 1922 to 1955 and as cross country coach from 1955 to 1958. He was nominated for the College Football Hall of Fame in 1960. Gauthier was one of the initial inductees into the Ohio Wesleyan Athletic Hall of Fame in 1961. He was also a charter inductee into the Ohio Association of Track and Cross Country Coaches Hall Of Fame in 1969. He was also inducted into the Helms Foundation Hall of Fame for his contributions to collegiate athletics.

Gauthier died in August 1964 in a hospital in Ontario, Canada, two weeks after suffering a heart attack. He was survived by his wife, Ruth Gauthier, a son Richard Gauthier, and two stepchildren. The Board of Education in Delaware, Ohio voted just a few hours before Gauthier's death to name a new high school stadium in his honor.

== Head coaching record ==
=== Football ===
| Year | Team | Overall | Conference | Standing | Bowl/playoffs |
|---|---|---|---|---|---|
Michigan Agricultural Aggies (Independent) (1918)
| 1918 | Michigan Agricultural | 4–3 | | | |
| Michigan Agricultural: | | 4–3 | | | |
Ohio Wesleyan Battling Bishops (Ohio Athletic Conference) (1921–1925)
| 1921 | Ohio Wesleyan | 1–6–1 | 1–6–1 | 16th | |
| 1922 | Ohio Wesleyan | 8–1 | 7–0 | 1st | |
| 1923 | Ohio Wesleyan | 6–2 | 5–0 | 2nd | |
| 1924 | Ohio Wesleyan | 7–2 | 4–1 | 3rd | |
| 1925 | Ohio Wesleyan | 7–1–1 | 6–0 | 1st | |
Ohio Wesleyan Battling Bishops (Ohio Athletic Conference / Buckeye Athletic Association) (1926–1927)
| 1926 | Ohio Wesleyan | 6–2–1 | 5–1–1 / 3–0–1 | 6th / 1st | |
| 1927 | Ohio Wesleyan | 4–3–2 | 2–2–1 / 1–2–1 | 11th / 4th | |
Ohio Wesleyan Battling Bishops (Buckeye Athletic Association) (1928–1938)
| 1928 | Ohio Wesleyan | 8–1 | 4–1 | T–1st | |
| 1929 | Ohio Wesleyan | 6–2–1 | 3–1–1 | 2nd | |
| 1930 | Ohio Wesleyan | 7–2 | 3–1 | 2nd | |
| 1931 | Ohio Wesleyan | 5–3 | 2–1 | T–3rd | |
| 1932 | Ohio Wesleyan | 5–4 | 2–2 | T–3rd | |
| 1933 | Ohio Wesleyan | 6–4 | 2–3 | 4th | |
| 1934 | Ohio Wesleyan | 7–2 | 3–1 | 2nd | |
| 1935 | Ohio Wesleyan | 5–3–1 | 3–2 | T–2nd | |
| 1936 | Ohio Wesleyan | 1–6–2 | 1–3–1 | 6th | |
| 1937 | Ohio Wesleyan | 2–7 | 1–4 | 5th | |
| 1938 | Ohio Wesleyan | 1–9 | 1–3 | T–4th | |
Ohio Wesleyan Battling Bishops (Independent) (1939–1946)
| 1939 | Ohio Wesleyan | 5–4–1 | | | |
| 1940 | Ohio Wesleyan | 2–4–3 | | | |
| 1941 | Ohio Wesleyan | 5–4 | | | |
| 1942 | Ohio Wesleyan | 4–4 | | | |
| 1943 | Ohio Wesleyan | 4–6 | | | |
| 1944 | Ohio Wesleyan | 1–8–1 | | | |
| 1945 | Ohio Wesleyan | 3–4 | | | |
| 1946 | Ohio Wesleyan | 5–4–1 | | | |
| Ohio Wesleyan: | | 121–98–15 | 55–32–5 | | |
| Total: | | 125–101–15 | | | |
National championship Conference title Conference division title or championship game berth
