= Izzone =

Men's basketball team of Michigan State University

The Izzone is the Michigan State University men's basketball team student section organized and run by the Athletic Marketing Department at Michigan State University. Named after head coach Tom Izzo, the Izzone consists of roughly 5,000 members, seated in both the lower and upper bowls of the Breslin Center. With 5,000 students cheering on the MSU Men's Basketball team, the Izzone has consistently made the Breslin Center one of the hardest places in the country for opponents to play in.

== History ==
The Izzone's roots can be found in the Spartan Spirits, a group formed by retired men's basketball coach Jud Heathcote. Spartan Spirits had a t-shirt theme each season. Among the most popular themes was Jud's Jungle, used in Heathcote's final season in 1994–95. When Tom Izzo became head coach, the Student Alumni Foundation(SAF) planned to keep the Spartan Spirits name, and the tradition of t-shirt themes would continue. In September 1995, SAF collected suggestions for a new t-shirt. John McPherson submitted the Izzone name, which was selected for the 1995–96 theme. The Izzone name was so popular it replaced the Spartan Spirits as the group's name. The Izzone only had 180 members in that first season. The Izzone has grown considerably since 1995–96, thanks to Coach Izzo's support. With a Big Ten championship in 1998 and 1999 and an NCAA championship in 2000, the team was quickly becoming more widely known and appreciated on campus, and therefore the Izzone expanded as well.

== The inner working ==
The Izzone is run by a student leadership group working directly with members of Michigan State Athletic's Marketing Department. The directors set up the student sections before every game by placing a newspaper, a bag, and a cotton towel. The directors are also responsible for tracking the attendance of all Izzone members, scanning id's at the door, and planning other events, such as the Izzone campout.

== Lower bowl eligibility ==
The Izzone is split into two sections, the upper bowl, and the lower bowl of the Breslin Center. The lower bowl is more desired by students because of its location closest to the basketball court. In order for a student to qualify for the lower bowl, they must meet the following criteria:

- Students eligible to order student season basketball admission must be enrolled full-time in a degree-granting program at MSU's East Lansing campus for both Fall and Spring semesters. Lifelong education students do not qualify as students enrolled in a degree granting program. College of Education students working towards their teaching certificate are allowed a one-year grace period (provided they are enrolled full-time).
- Students must have a high attendance record to the basketball games, arriving early to make check-in.
- First time ticket holders are automatically put in the upper bowl, and are reviewed for the coming season for lower bowl.
- Must attend the Izzone campout event, if not, must fill out an excuse form with proper documentation.

Members of the Izzone regularly research opponents and create "scouting reports" with information from the internet and other sources. Grade point averages, police records, and embarrassing nicknames are popular.

=== Izzone campout ===
Students must attend the annual October Izzone camp out if they want a chance of getting lower-bowl tickets. Returning lower-bowl members who have completed the camp out and missed two games or fewer the previous season are given first priority.

The Izzone witnessed a 53-home-game win streak, spanning from the end of the 1997–98 season until the middle of the 2001–2002 season. Michigan State lost March 1, 1998, 99–96 in overtime to Purdue. The next home loss was January 12, 2002, 64–63 to Wisconsin.

In 2006, it was ranked the fourth greatest college basketball student section by Sports Illustrated's SI on Campus magazine.
