= Al Kircher =

American baseball, basketball, and football player and coach

Biographical details
- Born: December 5, 1909; Turtle Lake, Wisconsin, U.S.
- Died: November 1, 2004 (aged 94); Salem, Oregon, U.S.

Playing career
- 1931–1933: Michigan State
- Positions: Quarterback (football), Guard (basketball), Outfielder (baseball)

Coaching career (HC unless noted)

Football
- 1939–1949: Michigan State (assistant)
- 1950–1951: Washington State (backfield)
- 1952–1955: Washington State

Basketball
- 1939–1949: Michigan State (assistant)
- 1949–1950: Michigan State

Baseball
- 1940–1950: Michigan State (assistant)

Head coaching record
- Overall: 13–25–2 (football); 4–18 (basketball)

Alton S. Kircher (December 5, 1909 – November 1, 2004) was an American football, basketball, and baseball player and coach.

== Early years ==
Born in Turtle Lake, Wisconsin, Kircher grew up in the Upper Peninsula of Michigan in Gladstone. He was a star athlete at Gladstone High School and then attended Michigan State College in East Lansing, where he earned nine letters in football, basketball, and baseball for the Spartans. Kircher was the quarterback on the football team and the captain of the basketball team. An outfielder in baseball, he had a batting average of .430 (37 for 86) in 1933.

== Coaching career ==
Kircher began his coaching career in Michigan at Trout Creek High School in 1935 as the basketball coach, and won two state titles (class D), in 1935 and 1937. Kircher moved to Marquette in 1937 and coached at Marquette High School (Graveraet).

Kircher returned to his alma mater, Michigan State, as an assistant coach in three sports from 1939 to 1950, and was head basketball coach for 1949–50 season. During World War II, he served in the U.S. Army and was wounded during the Normandy invasion, earning a Purple Heart. He was later awarded a Silver Star and two Bronze Stars.

When fellow Spartan assistant Forest Evashevski was hired as the head football coach at Washington State College of the Pacific Coast Conference in 1950, Kircher followed him west and joined his staff in Pullman as backfield coach. In Evashevski's second season in 1951, the Cougars were 7–3, their best record since 1932. Evashevski left for Iowa of the Big Ten Conference in January 1952 and Kircher planned to go east with him, but was promoted and stayed on the Palouse as the 20th head coach of the Cougar football program.

Kircher's Cougars were 4–6 in each of his first three seasons, but fell to 1–7–2 in 1955 and he was fired days after the final game, a loss to rival Washington. His overall record for four seasons was 13–25–2.

== After coaching ==
Kircher was relieved of his head coaching duties in November 1955 with a year remaining on his five-year contract, at $12,500 per year. He opted to stay in Pullman and acquired a motel-restaurant, the Hilltop Lodge, in early 1956. He and his family operated it for nearly two decades, then moved to Las Vegas and later to Salem, Oregon.

== Death ==
Kircher died in 2004 at a nursing home in Salem, at age 94.

== Honors and awards ==
Kircher was inducted into the Upper Peninsula Sports Hall of Fame in Michigan in 1985. He was added to the Gladstone High School hall of fame in 2013.

== Head coaching record ==
=== College basketball ===
Record table
Season	Team	Overall	Conference	Standing	Postseason
Michigan State Spartans (Independent) (1949–1950)
1949–50	Michigan State	4–18			
Michigan State:		4–18 (.182)			
Total:		4–18 (.182)			

=== College football ===
Year	Team	Overall	Conference	Standing	Bowl/playoffs
Washington State Cougars (Pacific Coast Conference) (1952–1955)
1952	Washington State	4–6	3–4	5th	
1953	Washington State	4–6	3–4	5th	
1954	Washington State	4–6	3–4	5th	
1955	Washington State	1–7–2	1–5–1	T–7th	
Washington State:		13–25–2	10–17–1		
Total:		13–25–2			
