= Lyman Frimodig =

American sportsman and politician (1891–1972)

Biographical details
- Born: October 9, 1891; Laurium, Michigan, U.S.
- Died: May 1972

Playing career
- 1914–1917: Michigan Agricultural
- Position: Center (basketball)

Coaching career (HC unless noted)

Basketball
- 1920–1922: Michigan Agricultural

Head coaching record
- Overall: 24–20

Lyman L. "Frim" Frimodig (October 9, 1891 – May 1972) was an American athlete, college basketball coach and athletics administrator. He was the only athlete in the history of Michigan State University to receive ten varsity letters, four each in basketball and baseball and two in football. He held the school's single-game scoring record in basketball for 35 years. He was the head coach of the school's basketball team from 1920 to 1922 and subsequently served the school until 1960 as a professor of health and physical education, assistant athletics director, ticket sales manager, and athletics department business manager. He also served four years as the mayor of East Lansing, Michigan, from 1933 to 1937.

== Early years in Calumet ==
A native of Laurium in Michigan's Upper Peninsula, Frimodig was an all-around athlete at Calumet High School. He grew up a block away from, and was boyhood friends with, George Gipp, who went on to fame playing football for Knute Rockne at Notre Dame. He played high school football on the same team with both Gipp and College Football Hall of Fame inductee, Hunk Anderson. In 1934, Frimodig and another classmate, William Lavers, established and donated the George Gipp All-American Trophy, presented annually to the outstanding athlete at Calumet High School.

== Athlete at Michigan Agricultural College ==
Frimodig subsequently attended Michigan Agricultural College, now known as Michigan State University, where he played basketball, baseball and football from 1914 to 1917. He is the first and only athlete in Michigan State history to have received ten varsity letters (four each in basketball and baseball and two in football). He was the captain of the Aggies' basketball team for the 1915–16 season, and he held the school's single-game scoring record (30 points) for 35 years. Frimodig set the scoring record in a 56–20 win over Hope College in January 1915. After the game, the student newspaper reported on Frimodig's performance as follows:

He easily upheld the reputation gained last year of being the best center seen here in some time, as his efforts scored more than half of his team's points, no less than fifteen baskets being credited to him. He shot from every conceivable angle, and with a certainty which brought the crowd to their feet again and again.

Frimodig led the Aggies with 126 points in the 1914–15 basketball season. In the Spartan Sports Encyclopedia, Jack Seibold noted:

No Aggie-Spartan athlete has ever equaled or bettered Lyman Frimodig's exploit of having earned a total of 10 varsity awards during his MAC career ... By that measure alone, through the years many have considered 'Frim' the greatest to have ever worn the Green and White.

== Escanaba and military service ==
After graduating from the college in 1917, Frimodig returned to the Upper Peninsula of Michigan where he coached and was principal at Escanaba High School. His work there was interrupted by the United States' entry into World War I, as Frimodig served in the military.

== Coach and administrator at Michigan State ==
After being discharged from the military in 1919, Frimodig was hired as the freshman football coach at Michigan Agricultural College. He was the school's head basketball coach for two seasons (1920–1922), compiling a 24–20 record. He remained employed by the school for 41 years as a professor of health and physical education, assistant athletic director, ticket sales manager, and athletic department business manager. He also served four years from 1933 to 1937 as the mayor of East Lansing.

Frimodig also helped organize and manage Michigan's first state high school basketball tournaments, as well as state high school swimming and track and field meets held on the Michigan State campus. Charles E. Forsythe, the state high school athletic director who worked with Frimodig in organizing the state's first high school basketball tournament, recalled, "We actually had to give tickets away to get it going."

Frimodig retired from Michigan State on 1 July 1960. In May 1960, he was honored with a "Friends of Frim" banquet at the Kellogg Center in East Lansing. An Associated Press story on the banquet noted: "The turnout of nearly 500 friends for the Frimodig testimonial proved again that sports people are hard to match when it comes to loyalty and sentiment. Tangible proof was presentation of a check for $3,000 to the guest of honor."

== Later years and death ==
After retiring from Michigan State, Frimodig remained in East Lansing and continued his lifelong affiliation with Michigan State athletics. In 1971, he co-authored "Spartan Saga: A History of Michigan State Athletics." Proceeds from the book were donated to the Ralph H. Young Scholarship Fund to extend financial aid to athletes.

Frimodig continued to hold the title of professor emeritus until his death in 1972.

== Posthumous honors ==
Frimodig was posthumously inducted into the Upper Peninsula Sports Hall of Fame in March 1973; the award was accepted by Frimodig's nephew, David M. Frimodig. He was also inducted into the Michigan Sports Hall of Fame in 1976, and the MSU Athletics Hall of Fame as a charter member in 1992.
