= Michigan State Spartans men's basketball =

NCAA Division I basketball program

2026–27 Michigan State Spartans men's basketball team
- University: Michigan State University
- First season: 1898–99; 128 years ago
- Athletic director: Dan Bartholomae
- Head coach: Tom Izzo; 32nd season, 764–310 (.711)
- Location: East Lansing, Michigan
- Arena: Breslin Center (capacity: 14,759)
- NCAA division: Division I
- Conference: Big Ten
- Nickname: Spartans
- Colors: Green and white
- Student section: Izzone
- All-time record: 1,888–1,170 (.617)
- NCAA tournament record: 78–38 (.672)

NCAA Division I tournament champions
- 1979, 2000
Other NCAA Division I tournament results
Runner-up	2009
Final Four	1957, 1979, 1999, 2000, 2001, 2005, 2009, 2010, 2015, 2019
Elite Eight	1957, 1959, 1978, 1979, 1999, 2000, 2001, 2003, 2005, 2009, 2010, 2014, 2015, 2019, 2025
Sweet Sixteen	1957, 1959, 1978, 1979, 1986, 1990, 1998, 1999, 2000, 2001, 2003, 2005, 2008, 2009, 2010, 2012, 2013, 2014, 2015, 2019, 2023, 2025, 2026
Appearances	1957, 1959, 1978, 1979, 1985, 1986, 1990, 1991, 1992, 1994, 1995, 1998, 1999, 2000, 2001, 2002, 2003, 2004, 2005, 2006, 2007, 2008, 2009, 2010, 2011, 2012, 2013, 2014, 2015, 2016, 2017, 2018, 2019, 2021, 2022, 2023, 2024, 2025, 2026

Conference tournament champions
- Big Ten: 1999, 2000, 2012, 2014, 2016, 2019

Conference regular-season champions
- Big Ten: 1957, 1959, 1967, 1978, 1979, 1990, 1998, 1999, 2000, 2001, 2009, 2010, 2012, 2018, 2019, 2020, 2025

The Michigan State Spartans men's basketball team is the intercollegiate men's basketball program representing Michigan State University. The school competes in the Big Ten Conference of NCAA Division I college basketball. The Spartans have won two NCAA National championships, 17 Big Ten regular season championships, and six Big Ten Tournament championships. Their home games are played at the Jack Breslin Student Events Center ("Breslin Center") in East Lansing, Michigan. Tom Izzo has been the head coach since 1995.

Their two national championships came in the 1979 NCAA tournament and the 2000 NCAA tournament. The 1979 national championship game was the most watched college basketball game in history, with 35.11 million television viewers. The 1979 National Championship team was coached by Jud Heathcote, and included tournament MVP Magic Johnson, Greg Kelser, and Jay Vincent. The Spartans defeated the previously unbeaten Indiana State, led by future Hall of Famer Larry Bird. The 2000 National Championship team defeated Florida in the final. The team was coached by Tom Izzo and led by players Morris Peterson, Charlie Bell, Jason Richardson, and tournament MVP Mateen Cleaves.

The Spartans have participated in 39 NCAA tournaments (8th-most all-time) and appeared in 28 consecutive NCAA tournaments (the 2020 NCAA tournament was canceled due to the COVID-19 pandemic), the second-longest streak ever and the longest active streak in college basketball. Michigan State has the sixth most all-time Final Four appearances with 10 (1957, 1979, 1999, 2000, 2001, 2005, 2009, 2010, 2015, and 2019). The program is also ninth all-time in NCAA tournament winning percentage (.686, through 2023). Michigan State also has 15 NCAA Elite Eights (6th-most all-time), and 23 NCAA Sweet Sixteens (6th-most all-time).

On February 15, 2025, Izzo set the record for most wins by a coach in Big Ten conference play with 354. On March 5, 2025, Izzo moved into a three-way tie with Ward Lambert and Bob Knight for the most Big Ten regular season championships, each with 11 championship teams.

== Team history ==
=== 1898–1954: early years ===
The first established coach for Michigan Agricultural College (MSU's name at the time), Charles Bemies was also the first athletic director in school history, while also coaching the football, baseball, and track teams. His two-year stint as basketball head coach ended in 1901. MAC's second basketball coach was George Denman. Denman is the only basketball coach to go undefeated during his tenure, posting an 11–0 mark during his two seasons. His team still holds the record for largest margin of victory with a 102–3 defeat of Alma College in 1902. MAC's first full-time athletic director and one of the Spartan's most successful coaches, Chester Brewer led the football, basketball, and baseball squads to winning records. He holds the highest winning percentage of any Spartan basketball coach with at least four seasons at .736 (70–25). His team also defeated Michigan in the schools’ first meeting in 1909. George Gauthier was the first alumnus to lead a Michigan State basketball squad. He compiled a career record of 41–38 over four seasons. Gauthier left after 29 games in 1919– 20, posting a 15–14 record. Lyman Frimodig coached the final seven games of the season, going 6–1. He would also serve as head coach for the next two seasons. He remained active in the athletic department after his stint as basketball coach, serving Michigan State for 41 years as assistant athletic director and business manager.

Benjamin Van Alstyne coached MSU for 22 years from 1926 to 1949. He is third in career victories with 231. Van Alstyne coached MSU's first All-American, Roger Grove, in 1930. Some of his greatest victories included a 27–26 victory over Michigan in 1930 at the dedication of Demonstration Hall, and a 66–50 upset over Kentucky in 1945 that was named “Coca-Cola Upset of the Week.” His 47–45 loss to Kentucky in 1948 set the record for the largest crowd in Jenison Field House history.

In one season under Alton Kircher, the Spartans finished 4–18. Following the conclusion of the 1950 season, the Spartans joined the Big Ten Conference.

Pete Newell was hired from San Francisco following a successful four years with the Dons where he went 70–37 and won the 1949 NIT. His 1951–52 squad was the first ranked Spartan team and also registered a win over No. 14 Notre Dame, the first win over a ranked opponent in school history. One of his biggest wins was a 1952 defeat of No. 2-ranked Kansas State. After four seasons, California hired Newell as its head coach and MSU had to search for another coach. Newell is often considered to be one of the most influential figures in the history of basketball.

=== 1954–1965: Forrest "Forddy" Anderson era ===
Forrest "Forddy" Anderson was hired away from Bradley following a trip to the 1954 Final Four with the Braves. His Bradley team had also made it to the 1950 championship game.

Two years after taking over the Spartans, in 1957, he led MSU to its first Big Ten Championship. After opening the season with a 4–7 record, the Spartans won 10 in a row and 12-of-13 to capture their first league title and advance to the school's first NCAA tournament. A bye in the first round of the tournament preceded wins over Notre Dame and Kentucky to earn a trip to the Final Four. A loss to North Carolina in the Final Four left MSU in the national third-place game where they lost to San Francisco.

Two years later, led by All-American Johnny Green, the Spartans cruised to a Big Ten Championship, winning the league by four games. A win over Marquette in the 1959 NCAA tournament put MSU in the Mideast regional finals against Kentucky. The Spartans lost and fell one game short of another trip to the Final Four.

Following his initial successes in East Lansing, his Spartan teams only finished with a winning record one time after 1959. He was fired following the 1964–65 season.

=== 1965–1976: post-Anderson era ===
John Benington, who had been an assistant to Anderson at Bradley before joining his staff at MSU, took over as head coach and led MSU to a second-place Big Ten finish in his first season at the helm. The next season, he led the Spartans to a shared Big Ten title, but Indiana received the NCAA tournament bid (at that time, only one Big Ten team received an NCAA bid). After four seasons leading the Spartans, he died of a heart attack after jogging at Jenison Fieldhouse in the summer of 1969 at the age of 47.

Gus Ganakas was an assistant under Benington and was hired to take over following Benington's death. His most successful seasons were in 1973–74 with a fourth-place Big Ten finish and 1974–75 with a 17–9 overall record. In 1975, 10 black members of his team walked out before a game against Indiana for what was perceived at the time as a racial disagreement over starting a white player. Ganakas was fired in 1976, but he continued to be a part of the Michigan State Athletics Department, serving as an assistant A.D. and then as an aide to coach Tom Izzo from 1998 to 2000. He was an MSU basketball radio announcer until 2017. He died in 2019.

=== 1976–1995: Jud Heathcote era ===
Jud Heathcote was hired to take over as coach in 1976 from Montana by athletic director Joseph Kearney in May 1976, after coaching the Grizzlies for five years. Heathcote had led the Grizzlies to two Big Sky championships and the 1975 NCAA tournament, the Grizzlies first ever trip to the tournament. He finished his tenure at Montana with an 80–53 record.

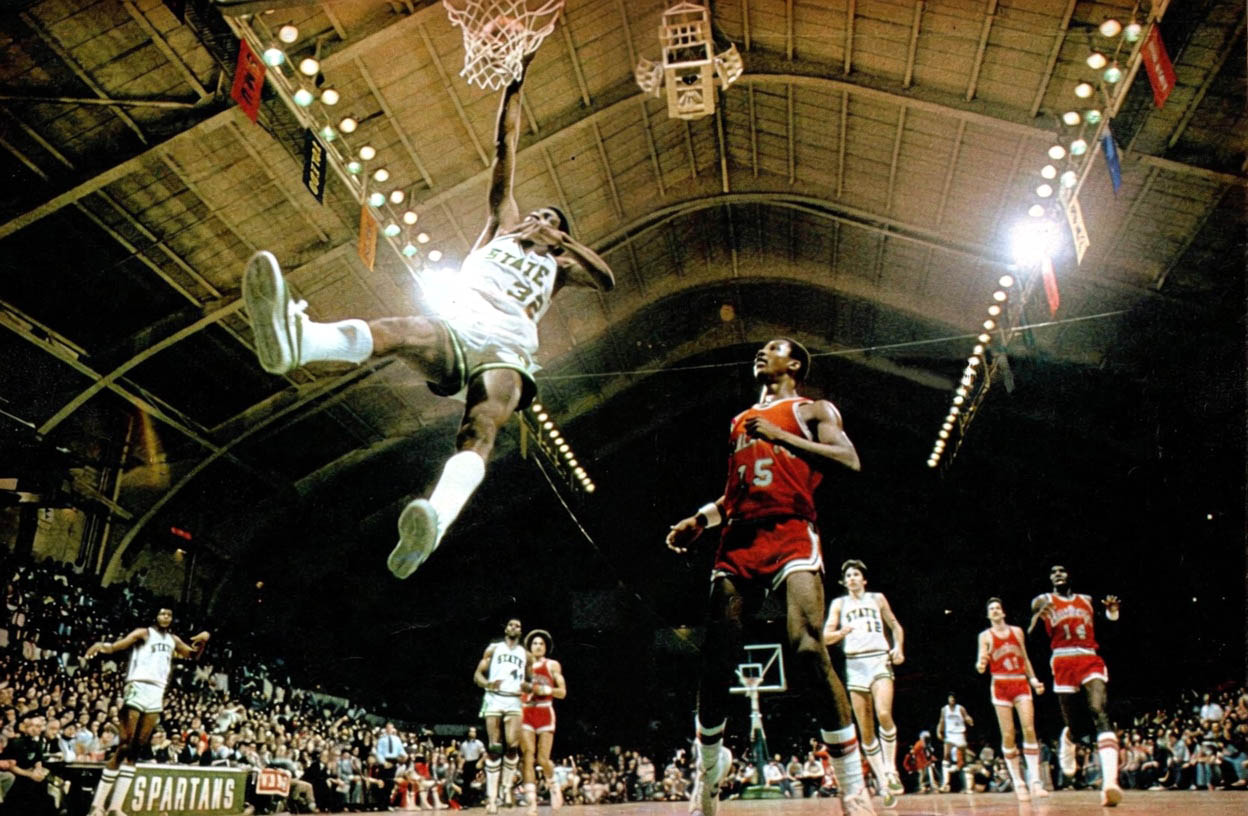
Greg Kelser (#32) doing a slam dunk in a Michigan State game

As a virtual unknown, Heathcote came to East Lansing looking to return MSU to greatness. In his second year, he landed one of the game's all-time greats, Earvin "Magic" Johnson, from nearby Lansing Everett High School, as a recruit. The 1977–78 Spartans won the Big Ten title, their first since 1967, and qualified for the NCAA tournament for only the third time in school history. They advanced to the Elite Eight and were led by Johnson and Greg Kelser. In 1979, the duo led the Spartans to a second consecutive Big Ten title and the NCAA National Championship. The NCAA championship marked the school's first in basketball.

Following the championship, Johnson left school to join the NBA and Kelser graduated. The result was a ninth place finish in the Big Ten the next year and struggles thereafter. MSU returned to postseason play in 1983, finishing with a 17–13 record and receiving an invitation to the National Invitation Tournament.

Following the expansion of the NCAA tournament to 64 teams in 1985, Heathcote returned the Spartans, led by the future MSU all-time scoring leader, Scott Skiles, to the tournament with a fifth-place finish in the Big Ten. MSU again reached the NCAA tournament the following year after finishing third in the Big Ten with a 23–8 record. Led by Skiles and Darryl Johnson, they advanced to the Sweet Sixteen before losing.

Heathcote returned MSU to postseason play in 1989, led by Steve Smith, losing the third-place game of the NIT. Smith returned the Spartans to the NCAA tournament in 1990 as a No. 1 seed. The Spartans narrowly avoided losing to No. 16-seeded Murray State, needing overtime to advance to the second round. They again narrowly advanced to the Sweet Sixteen before losing to Georgia Tech in overtime. The Spartans also made an appearance in the 1991 NCAA tournament. The Spartans finished in third place in Big Ten play and received an at-large bid as a No. 5 seed to the tournament where they beat Green Bay on a buzzer beater by Smith. In the second round, they lost to No. 10 Utah in double overtime.

The Spartans made their third straight trip to the NCAA tournament in 1992. Another third-place finish in Big Ten play resulted in an at-large bid as a No. 5 seed to the NCAA tournament. There they beat Missouri State before losing to Cincinnati in the second round in a rematch of an earlier Spartan win.

A trip to the NIT in 1993 broke the NCAA tournament streak, but Heathcote again led MSU to the NCAA tournament in 1994. A fourth-place finish the Big Ten led to an at-large bid to the Tournament as a No. 7 seed. Led by Shawn Respert, they beat Seton Hall in the first round before losing to second-seeded Duke in the second round.

In his final year at MSU in 1995, Heathcote returned the Spartans to the NCAA tournament for the fifth time in six years. A second-place finish in Big Ten play resulted in an at-large bid to the Tournament as a No. 3 seed where they were surprised by No. 14-seeded Weber State in the first round. The game marked the final game of All-American Shawn Respert's career at MSU.

Heathcote stepped down in 1995 after 19 seasons at Michigan State. He finished with nine NCAA appearances, three Big Ten championships, and three NIT appearances. He hand-picked his successor, Tom Izzo. "I had to orchestrate the hiring of Tom through (trustees) Bob Weiss and Joel Ferguson and the president (Peter McPherson) because most people wanted to open it up and see who would apply. And then some wanted a black coach," Heathcote said in 2014. "But I felt Tom deserved the job because he'd been there 12 years, and he'd gotten better in the job every single year. Tom was a tireless worker and had a passion for the game. So that combination, in my mind, I knew he was going to be a good coach."

In 2001, the National Association of Basketball Coaches awarded Heathcote with the Golden Anniversary Award for 50 years of service to college basketball. Also, in 2001, he was inducted into the MSU Athletics Hall of Fame. In 2009, Heathcote was inducted into the National Collegiate Basketball Hall of Fame.

=== 1995–present: Tom Izzo era ===
Tom Izzo took over for Heathcote in 1995 after 11 years as an assistant coach under Heathcote.

Michigan State struggled in the first season with Izzo at the helm and after losing All-American Shawn Respert. The Spartans finished the season at .500 (16–16, 9–9) and in a tie for seventh place in the Big Ten. MSU received an invitation to the NIT where they defeated Washington before losing to Fresno State in the second round. The season marked the last time MSU did not finish with a winning record.

In 1997, the Spartans welcomed new recruits Mateen Cleaves and Morris Peterson to East Lansing. Along with sophomore Antonio Smith, the three made up three-fourths of Izzo's "Flintstones" who would win the national championship in 2000 (without Smith). In what would be a rarity for MSU in Izzo's tenure, the Spartans played no ranked teams in the non-conference season. The Spartans finished in a tie for sixth place in the conference with a record of 16–11 overall and 9–9 in conference. They received an invitation to the NIT for the second consecutive year. MSU beat George Washington in the first round and lost in the second round to Florida State. As of 2026, this is the last year MSU failed to make the NCAA tournament.

In 1998, MSU welcomed freshman recruit Charlie Bell, the fourth of Izzo's "Flintstones" and started slow. They lost to No. 7 Temple, and suffered surprising losses to UIC and Detroit in non-conference. However, MSU won nine of their first 10 conference games before losing to eventual conference co-champion Illinois. In January, MSU entered the AP and Coaches rankings for the first time since the end of the 1994–95 season. The Spartans finished in a tie for the conference championship, their first since 1990, with a record of 13–3 in conference play. Mateen Cleaves was named Big Ten Player of the Year. The Spartans earned the No. 1 seed in the inaugural Big Ten tournament, but lost their first game in the quarterfinals to Minnesota. Izzo's team received an at-large bid to the NCAA tournament as a No. 4 seed in the East Region, their first trip to the Tournament since 1995. MSU advanced to their first Sweet Sixteen since 1990 by beating Eastern Michigan and No. 8 Princeton. The Spartans were eliminated from the Tournament by No. 1 North Carolina in the Sweet Sixteen.

As the 1998–99 season began, Izzo began his willingness to play anyone anywhere mantra as the Spartans played three top seven teams in their first seven games. However, MSU lost all three. MSU recovered and, after losing their first Big Ten game to No. 24 Wisconsin, the Spartans won the remaining 15 games in conference and won the Big Ten conference regular season by six games with a record of 15–1, their second consecutive Big Ten title. For the second consecutive year, Mateen Cleaves was named Big Ten Player of the Year. The Spartans won the Big Ten tournament and earned the conference's automatic bid to the NCAA tournament. As the No. 1 seed in the Midwest region and ranked No. 2 in the country, MSU defeated Mount St. Mary's, and Mississippi to advance to their second straight Sweet Sixteen. A win over Oklahoma and Kentucky led MSU to the Final Four for the first time since 1979. However, MSU fell short in their bid for an NCAA championship, losing to Duke in the Final Four.

In 1999–2000. Seniors Mateen Cleaves and Morris Peterson led the way for the Spartans as they began the season ranked No. 3 in the country. However, Cleaves sustained a stress fracture in his right foot prior to the season which forced him to miss the non-conference schedule and MSU fell to 9–4 and ranked No. 11 in the country. After Cleaves' return, MSU finished the Big Ten regular season with a 13–3 conference record and 23–7 overall while being ranked No. 2 in the country and earned a share of the Big Ten title, their third consecutive Big Ten championship. Peterson was named Big Ten Player of the Year, the third consecutive year a Spartan had received the award. The Spartans went on to win the third annual Big Ten tournament as the No. 2 seed, defeating No. 25 Illinois for the championship for the second consecutive year. The Spartans were awarded the No. 1 seed, their second consecutive No. 1 seed, in the Midwest Region of the NCAA tournament. From there, the Spartans cruised to their third consecutive Sweet Sixteen with wins over Valparaiso, and Utah. MSU continued their national championship push by reaching their second consecutive Final Four with wins over Syracuse and Iowa State. MSU won every game by double digits despite playing the best possible seed in each round. In their Final Four matchup, Michigan State faced off against fellow Big Ten foe, Wisconsin, beating them in a hard-fought game, 53–41. In the national championship game, the Spartans triumphed over the Florida Gators 89–76, despite losing Cleaves to an ankle injury 3:42 into the second half. The win marked MSU's second national championship in basketball and Izzo's first and only championship to date.

Losing both Cleaves and Peterson to graduation following the season, MSU still began the 2000–01 season ranked No. 3 in the country. Led by sophomore Jason Richardson, freshmen Zach Randolph, and seniors Charlie Bell and Andre Hutson, the Spartans finished the non-conference schedule undefeated and ranked No.1 in the country. MSU again earned a share the Big Ten title, their fourth consecutive, with a 13–3 conference record. They suffered a surprise defeat by Penn State in the Big Ten tournament in their attempt to win the tournament for the third consecutive year. They received their third consecutive No. 1 seed, in the South Region of the NCAA tournament. Seeking a repeat National Championship, MSU easily dispatched Alabama State and Fresno State to reach the Sweet Sixteen for the fourth consecutive year. A win over Gonzaga and Temple led to the school's third straight trip to the Final Four. However, they were unable to repeat as national champions, losing to Arizona in the National Semifinal. Following the season, Randolph and Richardson each left school early and declared for the NBA draft.

As a result of Randolph and Richardson's early departure, MSU struggled with Izzo's tough non-conference schedule in 2002. The Spartans lost four games, all to teams ranked in the top 25 and started the Big ten season with three straight losses. The loss to Wisconsin snapped MSU's 53-game home winning streak. Michigan State finished the conference schedule at 10–6 and in fourth place with an overall record of 19–10. MSU lost in the quarterfinals of the Big Ten tournament to No. 23 Indiana marking the first time since 1997 that Michigan State did not win either the Big Ten regular season or tournament title. The Spartans received an at-large bid as a No. 10 seed in the NCAA tournament and were eliminated in the first round by NC State.

Following the disappointment of an early NCAA tournament exit, the first time Izzo's squads had not won at least one game in the NCAA tournament, the 2002–03 team played another tough non-conference schedule. This time the Spartans faced three ranked teams, only losing one. However, they suffered four losses and finished the non-conference schedule at 8–4 and ranked No. 25 in the country. MSU began the Big Ten regular season losing four of their first six games and fell out of the rankings. The Spartans finished in a tie for third place in the Big Ten at 10–6 in conference and 18–11 overall. Michigan State beat Purdue in the Big Ten tournament quarterfinals, but fell to Ohio State in the semifinals. The Spartans received a bid to the NCAA tournament for the sixth consecutive year. MSU received a No. 7 seed in the South Region. A win over Colorado in the first round was followed by a rout of No. 10 Florida to reach the Sweet Sixteen for the fifth time in six years. The Spartans defeated No. 17 Maryland to advance to the Elite Eight for the fourth time in five years. However, MSU fell to No. 5 Texas in the Regional Final.

In 2004, Izzo looked to continue his dominant NCAA run. However, Izzo's penchant for tough scheduling hurt his team as they faced a murderer's row of a schedule which included three straight losses to No. 6 Duke, in overtime, to No. 14 Oklahoma at the Palace of Auburn Hills, and to No. 8 Kentucky at Ford Field in the Basketbowl. The Spartans followed this losing streak by losing two of their final four non-conference games including at No. 17 Syracuse and dropped out of the rankings. They finished the non-conference slate at 5–6. After a loss to open Big Ten play to No. 21 Wisconsin, the Spartans recovered to win seven of their next eight and six of their last seven Big Ten games. They finished in a tie for second place in the Big Ten at 12–4 and 17–10 overall. A win over Northwestern in the Big Ten tournament quarterfinals was followed by a third loss of the season to No. 17 Wisconsin. The Spartans received a No. 7 seed in the NCAA tournament, reaching the tournament for the seventh consecutive year. But, for the second time in three years, the Spartans were knocked out in the first round, this time by Nevada.

In 2005, the Spartans again looked to rebound from a disappointing early NCAA tournament exit. They started the season 3–2, but cruised through the Big Ten, only losing three games, including a loss to No. 1 Illinois and finished second in conference to Illinois. MSU finished the regular season with a 13–3 conference record and 22–5 overall while being ranked No. 13 in the country. The Spartans lost in the quarterfinals in the Big Ten tournament to Iowa. Michigan State received an at-large bid as a No. 5 seed in the Austin Regional of the NCAA tournament, their eighth straight appearance in the Tournament under Tom Izzo. Wins over Old Dominion and Vermont led the Spartans to the Sweet Sixteen for the sixth time in eight years. In the Sweet Sixteen, the Spartans beat No. 3-ranked and No. 1-seeded Duke, which MSU had not defeated since 1958. The win marked Izzo's first win over Duke's Mike Krzyzewski (as of 2017). A double overtime victory over Kentucky sent the Spartans to their fourth Final Four in seven seasons. MSU again fell in the Final Four, this time to No. 2-ranked and No. 1-seeded North Carolina.

The 2005–06 Spartans opened the season with a loss to Hawaii before losing to No. 8 Gonzaga led by Adam Morrison in triple overtime in the Maui Classic. Despite this, MSU ended the non-conference schedule at 12–2 and ranked No. 7 in the country. Early Big Ten losses followed by late season losses in conference left the Spartans 8–8 in the Big Ten. In the Big Ten tournament, MSU defeated Purdue and No. 9 Illinois before being defeated by No. 20 Iowa in the semifinals. The Spartans received an at-large bid as a No. 5 seed in the NCAA tournament, their ninth consecutive trip to the Tournament. In the Tournament, they lost to eventual Final Four Cinderella, George Mason, in the first round. Following the season, Shannon Brown declared for the NBA draft, leaving the Spartans one year prior to graduation, just the fourth player under Izzo to declare early.

The 2006–07 Spartans began the season 13–2, but were not ranked in the polls. A roller coaster Big Ten season resulted in MSU finishing 8–8 with a win against No. 1 Wisconsin which likely assured the Spartans a trip to the NCAA tournament. MSU lost to Wisconsin after beating Northwestern in the Big Ten tournament. The Spartans received an at-large bid to the NCAA tournament for the 10th consecutive year and beat Marquette, coached by former Izzo assistant Tom Crean, in the first round of the Tournament. A loss to No. 3 North Carolina in the second round ended the season.

In 2008, MSU finished the non-conference schedule 12–1 and ranked No. 6 in the country with wins over No. 24 NC State, No. 20 BYU, and No. 4 Texas. A hot start to the Big Ten schedule, winning six of seven, was followed by four losses in their next seven which left them in fourth place in the Big Ten with a record of 12–6. As the No. 4 seed tn the Big Ten tournament, they beat Ohio State before losing to No. 8 Wisconsin. The Spartans received an at-large bid to the NCAA tournament to mark their 11th consecutive trip to the Tournament under Tom Izzo. As a No. 5 seed, the Spartans beat Temple, and Pittsburgh to move on to the Sweet Sixteen for the seventh time in 11 years. A rout by a Derrick Rose-led Memphis ended the season.

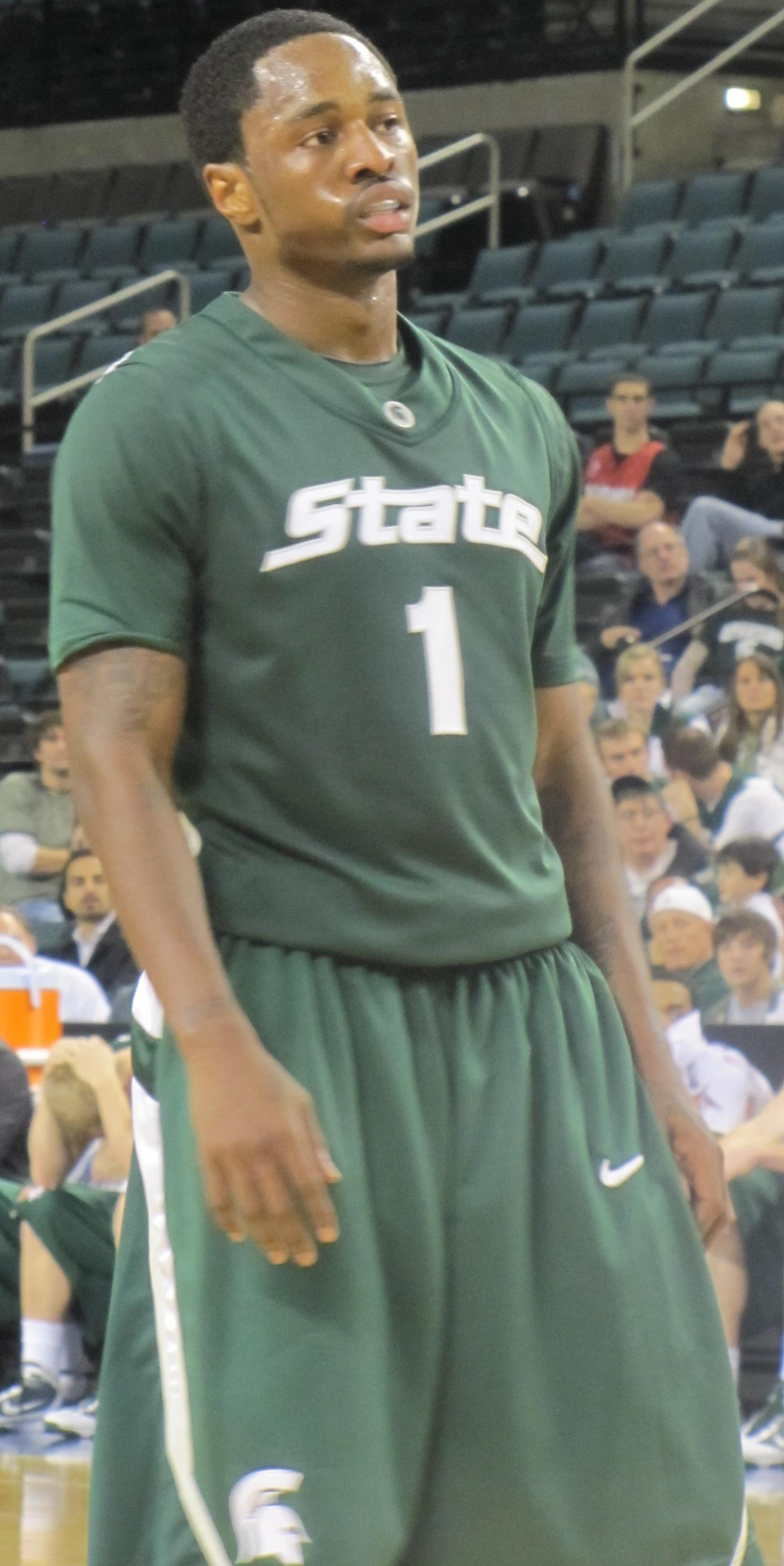
Kalin Lucas

By the beginning of the 2008–09 season, Izzo's teams, though having great success in the NCAA tournament, had not won the Big Ten regular season title since 2001. A solid non-conference start left them at 9–2 and were ranked No. 10 in the country. MSU routed the Big Ten, winning their first five conference games, their best start in conference since 1978. MSU finished the conference season well, winning the Big Ten championship by four games with a 15–3 record, 25–5 overall, and ranked No. 7 in the country. Following the conclusion of the regular season, Kalin Lucas was named Big Ten Player of the Year and Tom Izzo was voted Big Ten Coach of the Year. As the No. 1 seed in the Big Ten tournament, the Spartans defeated Minnesota. However, Michigan State's hopes for a No. 1 seed in the NCAA tournament likely vanished as they were defeated by Ohio State, 82–70. Michigan State received an at-large bid as the No. 2 seed in the Midwest Region of the NCAA tournament, their 12th straight appearance in the Tournament. With wins over Robert Morris and USC, the Spartans were able to advance to the Sweet Sixteen, the school's eighth trip to the Sweet Sixteen in the previous 12 years. MSU advanced to the Elite Eight with a win over No. 14-ranked and No. 3-seeded Kansas. In the Elite Eight, the Spartans defeated Louisville to advance to Final Four in nearby Detroit, only 90 miles from MSU's campus. The Spartans defeated UConn in the national semifinals to earn their third-ever trip to the national championship game. With Izzo 1–0 in championship games and the Spartans 2–0 all-time, North Carolina scored more points than any team had ever scored in the first half of an NCAA championship game, scoring 55 and blowing out the Spartans 89–72, marking the Spartans first ever loss in the national championship game.

In 2010, the Spartans finished the non-conference schedule at 10–3. The Spartans began the Big Ten season on fire, winning their first nine games and went on to earn a share of the Big Ten championship with a 14–4 and ranked 11th in the country. As the No. 3 seed in the Big Ten tournament, they were defeated in overtime by No. 6 seed Minnesota in the quarterfinals. The Spartans received an at-large bid to the NCAA tournament, their 13th straight appearance, earning a No. 5 seed in the Midwest Region. A win over New Mexico State and Maryland led MSU to the Sweet Sixteen for the ninth time in 13 years. However, Kalin Lucas suffered a serious knee injury and would miss the remainder of the tournament. MSU did not seem to miss him, and would go on to beat Northern Iowa and Tennessee to advance to their second consecutive Final Four and sixth in the prior 12 years. In the National semifinal, they were defeated by Butler by two points.

The 2010–11 Spartans. let by senior Kalin Lucas, finished the non-conference portion of their season 8–4 and ranked No. 20 in the country. However, the Spartans were inconsistent in conference play, suffering nine losses and finishing 9–9 in conference and in danger of missing the NCAA tournament. After beating Iowa and blowing out No. 9 Purdue in the Big Ten tournament, the Spartans fell to Penn State in the semifinals. The blowout win over Purdue likely ensured the Spartans inclusion in the NCAA tournament. Michigan State received a No. 10 seed in the Southeast Region of the NCAA tournament, their 14th straight appearance, but the lowest seeding the Spartans had received in the NCAA tournament since 2002. MSU fell behind early to UCLA in the second round (formerly known as the first round) and made a furious rally, but fell short, losing by two points. The loss marked only the fourth time MSU failed to win a game in their 14 trips to the NCAA tournament under Tom Izzo.

The 2011–12 Spartans, led by senior Draymond Green, started the season 0–2. However, MSU won the next 15 games in a row to jump into the top ten in the polls. A loss in the regular season finale at home to No. 10 Ohio State meant the Spartans shared the Big Ten regular season championship with Ohio State and Michigan, all of which finished the Big Ten season with a 13–5 conference record. In that loss to Ohio State, key freshman reserve, Branden Dawson, tore his ACL, ending his season. As the No. 1 seed in the Big Ten tournament, The Spartans beat Iowa, No. 14 Wisconsin, and No. 7 Ohio State to win the tournament championship, their first tournament championship since 2000. Draymond Green earned Big Ten Player of the Year honors, the fifth time a player had done so under Tom Izzo. Izzo was also named Big Ten Coach of the Year. MSU received a No. 1 seed in the West Region of the NCAA tournament, where they beat LIU–Brooklyn in the first round behind Green's triple-double. The Spartans overcame Saint Louis in the second round to advance to the Sweet Sixteen. This marked the 10th time in 15 seasons that the Spartans advanced to at least the Sweet Sixteen. The Spartans, missing Dawson and struggling offensively, became the first No. 1 seed to lose in the Tournament, falling to No. 17 and No. 4-seeded Louisville.

MSU began the 2012–13 season 11–2 and ranked No. 18 in the country with wins over No. 7 Kansas and Texas and were led by junior Keith Appling and freshman Gary Harris. The Spartans remained ranked the entire year while finishing tied for second in the Big Ten with Ohio State, with a 13–5 conference record and ranked No. 10 in the country. As the No. 3 seed in the Big Ten tournament, they beat Iowa in the quarterfinals, but fell to eventual tournament champion, Ohio State, in the semifinals. The Spartans received a No. 3 seed in the NCAA tournament, their 16th straight appearance in the tournament. MSU defeated Valparaiso and Memphis to advance to their fifth Sweet Sixteen in six years and their 11th trip in 16 years. However, the Spartans were defeated by Duke, who was led by Seth Curry, in the Sweet Sixteen.

Michigan State began the 2013–14 season looking to continue Tom Izzo's Final Four streak: every player who had played four years for Izzo had made at least one Final Four. After beating No. 1 Kentucky in the Champions Classic, the Spartans moved to the No. 1 spot in the country. The Spartans held the No. 1 spot for three weeks before losing to North Carolina in the ACC-Big Ten Challenge. The Spartans cruised through the remaining non-conference schedule, finishing 11–1, to begin the Big Ten season ranked No. 5 in the country. The Spartans won their first seven conference games, but due to injuries to Keith Appling, Adriean Payne, and Brendan Dawson, MSU lost five of their last eight conference games to finish in a second-place tie with Wisconsin at 12–6. The Spartans, finally healthy and at full strength, beat Northwestern, No. 12 Wisconsin, and No. 8 Michigan to capture the Big Ten tournament championship. This marked Michigan State's fourth tournament championship. Michigan State earned a No. 4 seed in the NCAA tournament's East Region. With wins against Delaware and Harvard, they advanced to the Sweet Sixteen for the third straight year and the 12th time in 17 years. They defeated No. 1-seeded Virginia in the Sweet Sixteen to advance to the Elite Eight for the first time since 2010. There they fell to No. 7 seed and eventual National Champion, Connecticut. With the loss, the Tom Izzo's Final Four streak ended. Shortly after the season, Gary Harris declared for the NBA draft.

In 2015, MSU started the season well, but with a shocking loss to Texas Southern at home in overtime, finished the non-conference season at 9–4 MSU rallied late in the Big Ten season, winning six of their last eight conference games. MSU finished the season in a tie for third place in conference and got hot in the Big Ten tournament beating Ohio State and No. 8 Maryland, before losing to No. 6 Wisconsin for the tournament title. The Spartans received an at-large bid to the NCAA tournament as a No. 7 seed in the East Region. The bid was MSU's 18th straight trip to the NCAA tournament. MSU beat Georgia in the second round and surprised No. 2-seeded and No. 6-ranked Virginia in the Third Round. With the win, the Spartans advanced to their fourth straight Sweet Sixteen and seventh Sweet Sixteen in eight years. Wins over Oklahoma and Louisville in overtime gave MSU a trip to their seventh Final Four under Tom Izzo. In the Final Four, the Spartans fell to the eventual National Champions for the second straight season, losing a rematch of their Champions Classic game to Duke in the National semifinal.

With senior Denzel Valentine leading the 2015–16 Spartans, MSU went undefeated in the non-conference with the school's best start in history and moved to No. 1 in the polls. However, Valentine suffered a knee injury in late December and would miss four games as MSU lost its first game of the season in Big Ten play and fell from the top spot in the polls. Upon Valentine's return, MSU continued to struggle, losing four of their first seven conference games and marking their worst conference start since 2003. The Spartans recovered well, losing only one more conference game and finished 13–5 in conference, good enough for second place in the Big Ten. MSU's 26 regular season wins tied the most for a Michigan State team in the regular season. Following the regular season, USA Today named Valentine National Player of the Year. The Big Ten also announced that Valentine was the Big Ten's Player of the Year. As the No. 2 seed in the Big Ten tournament, MSU defeated Ohio State for a third time on the season before dispatching Maryland and Purdue to win the tournament championship. With the win, MSU set the record for most Big Ten tournament championships with five (Ohio State has also won five, but one has been vacated due to NCAA violations). MSU, ranked No. 2 in the country, learned that it would not receive a No. 1 seed in the NCAA tournament, instead receiving a No. 2 seed in the Midwest bracket. This marked the 19th consecutive year the Spartans made the NCAA tournament. Despite receiving the No. 2 seed, MSU was considered by some the favorite to with the NCAA Championship. However, MSU was shocked by No. 15-seeded Middle Tennessee in the first round in what some argued was the biggest upset in NCAA tournament history at the time.

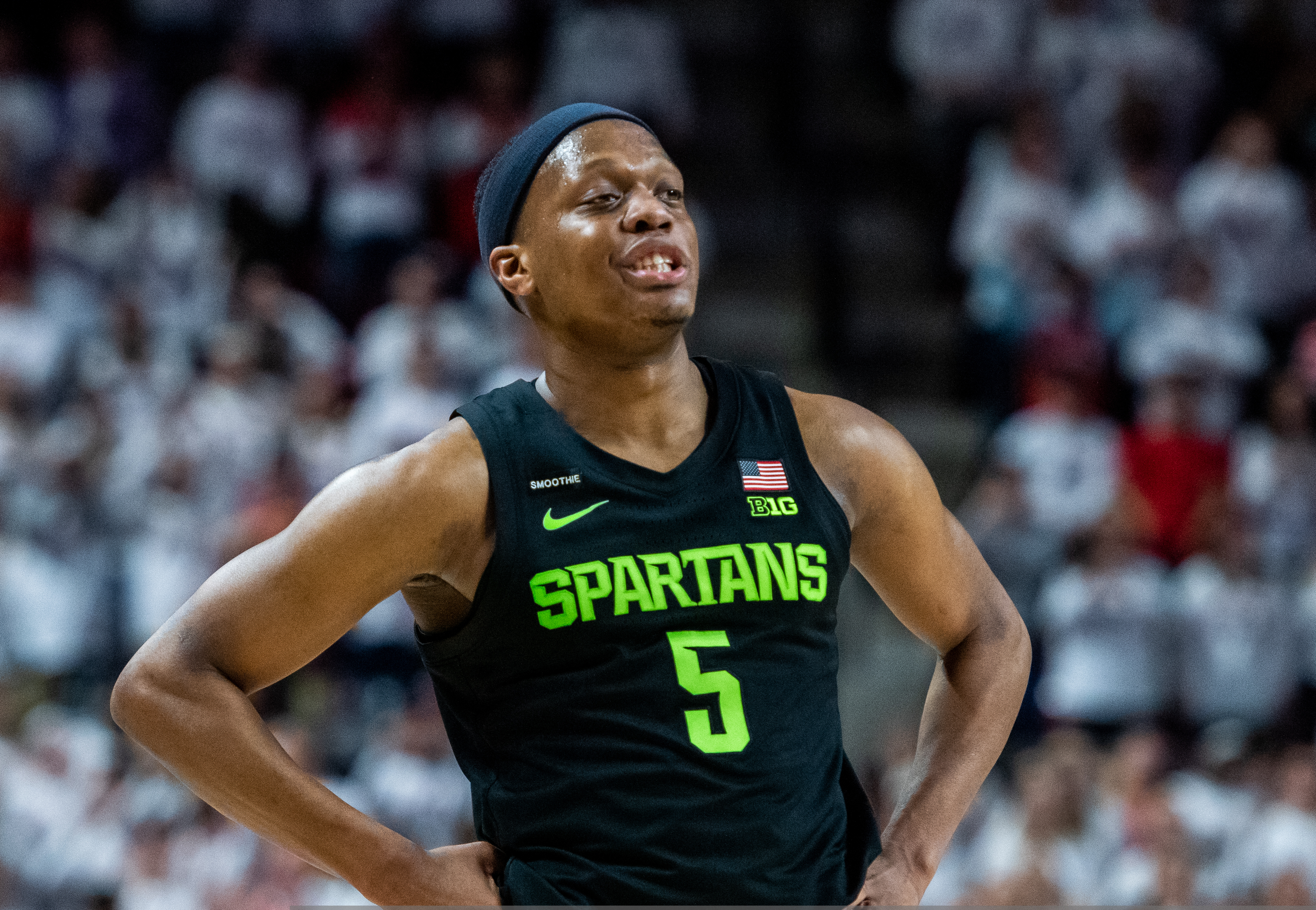
Cassius Winston

The 2016–17 Spartans were decimated by departures from the prior year as seniors Denzel Valentine, Bryn Forbes, and Matt Costello all graduated and moved to the NBA. Freshman Deyonta Davis also declared his eligibility for the NBA after the year and sophomores Javon Bess and Marvin Clark transferred out of the program. In all, five of the Spartans' top six scorers from the 2016 team did not return. In response, MSU welcomed their most-heralded recruiting class ever as four top-50 ranked players entered the program: Miles Bridges, Joshua Langford, Cassius Winston, and Nick Ward. A young team would look to graduate transfer Ben Carter and seniors Gavin Schilling and Eron Harris to fill the holes left by departing players. However, Carter and Schilling suffered season-ending knee injuries before the season began and Harris would suffer one late in the season. As a result, MSU struggled up front as Ward at 6' 8" was the tallest on the team. Former walk-on Kenny Goins became the backup big man at 6' 6". Following losses in their first two games to top-10 teams, MSU suffered two other losses to top-20 teams. Bridges missed seven games with a knee injury near the end of the non-conference slate and the Spartans, who started the season ranked as high as 10 in some polls, entered Big Ten play with an 8–5 record. Izzo would lament his early-season schedule which involved trips to Hawaii, New York, and the Bahamas when his young team wouldn't get needed practice time. Wins to start conference play over Minnesota (twice) and Northwestern, which would prove to be two of their better wins on the season, and Bridges's return had MSU at 4–1 in conference play. However, inconsistency haunted the Spartans as their failure to win road games left the Spartans at 8–5 in conference play with a visit to conference leaders, Purdue. MSU was handled easily by the Boilermakers and Harris suffered his knee injury which appeared to spell the end of MSU's 19-year NCAA tournament streak. However, Bridges, who averaged over 16 points and eight rebounds on the season, and Ward who averaged over 13 points and six rebounds, led the Spartans as they knocked off No. 16-ranked Wisconsin to likely seal a trip to the NCAA tournament. A 10–8 conference record left the Spartans in a tie for fifth place. A win over Penn State in the Big Ten tournament preceded a loss to Minnesota, but was enough for the Spartans to get an at-large bid to the NCAA tournament for the 20th consecutive year. As a No. 9 seed, a win over Miami in the first round led to a loss to No. 1-seeded Kansas and an end to the season. Bridges finished the season with perhaps the second-best freshman season in MSU history (behind Magic Johnson): 16.9 points, 8.3 rebounds, 2.1 assists, and 1.5 blocks per game.

Surprisingly, Bridges opted to not enter the NBA draft and returned to Michigan State for his sophomore year in 2017–18. With newcomer Jaren Jackson Jr., a consensus top-25 player, joining the team, the Spartans were picked by several publications as the No. 1 team in the country. They began the season ranked No. 2 behind Duke. After a loss to Duke in the second game of the season, the Spartans won the Victory Bracket of the PK–80 Tournament holding No. 9-ranked North Carolina to a school-record low for shooting percentage as they shot 24.6% from the field, including 5.6% from three-point land. The Spartans won 14 straight games, and ascended to No. 1 in the country. A road loss to surprise Big Ten contender Ohio State followed by a home loss to rival Michigan dropped MSU in the rankings and shook the team's confidence. However, the team rebounded well, finishing the season by winning their last 12 regular season games, including a win over Big Ten co-leader Purdue as Bridges took the ball and hit a three-pointer to win the game. On February 17, 2018 while playing at Northwestern, the Spartans overcame a 27-point deficit to beat the Wildcats, at that time, the fifth largest comeback all-time in Division I history. The Spartans finished with a school-record 16 Big Ten wins and their first outright regular season Big Ten title since 2009. The team also finished 28–3, a record for regular season wins. The Spartans fell again to their rival Michigan in the semifinals of the Big Ten tournament and received only a No. 3 seed in the NCAA tournament due to their low strength of schedule. The NCAA trip marked the school's 21st consecutive trip to the Tournament, but following a win in the first round over Bucknell, the Spartans fell to 11th-seeded Syracuse marking the third consecutive year and first time under Izzo that the Spartans had failed to reach the Sweet Sixteen in a three-year period. The Spartans led the nation in field goal defense, rebounding margin, and blocks. Freshman Jaren Jackson Jr. set the single-season MSU record for blocks and was named the Big Ten Freshman of the Year. Bridges was named first-team All-Big Ten and second team All-American. For much of the season, the on-court play was shrouded by reports that surfaced that Tom Izzo's program had covered up sexual assault allegations ten years prior. Izzo refused to comment on the reports due to an ongoing investigation by several agencies including Michigan Attorney General's office and the United States Department of Education, but repeatedly said he had no intention of leaving Michigan State and that he had cooperated with all investigations including the previous allegation of sexual assault in 2010. In August 2018 the NCAA cleared Izzo in his handling of the sexual assault allegations. The school was implicated tangentially to the FBI-college basketball scandal as reports surfaced that Bridges had been paid to attend Michigan State, among other allegations. MSU conducted an investigation and presented their findings that the allegations were false to the NCAA, who cleared Bridges, ruling him eligible to play.

Following Bridges and Jackson's departures to the NBA, the 2018–19 team began the season ranked No. 10 in the country. The season was dominated by injuries to the Spartans. Starting guard Joshua Langford only played 13 games before missing the rest of the season with a foot injury. Key starter Matt McQuaid missed three games with injury and key reserve Kyle Ahrens missed nine games with back and ankle injuries. With five games remaining in the Big Ten regular season, big man Nick Ward suffered a hairline fracture in his shooting hand and missed the rest of the regular season. He returned in time for the postseason, but was not the same as he struggled to return to the lineup. Despite this, the Spartans earned a share of the Big Ten regular season championship with Purdue and defeated arch-rival Michigan twice in the regular season. Led by Big Ten Player of the Year and consensus second team All-American Cassius Winston, the Spartans also won the Big Ten tournament for the sixth time, again defeating Michigan in the championship game to go 3–0 against their rival. As the No. 2 seed in the NCAA tournament, the school's 22nd straight appearance in the Tournament, the Spartans defeated Bradley and Minnesota to advance to their first Sweet Sixteen in four years. In the Sweet Sixteen, the Spartans blew out No. 3 seed LSU to face top-seeded Duke in the Elite Eight. Despite having multiple first round NBA Draft picks, the Spartans knocked off the Blue Devils to earn a trip to the school's 10th Final Four and eighth under Izzo. The win over Duke improved Izzo's record to 2–11 against Duke coach Mike Krzyzewski. In the Final Four, the Spartans were upset by Texas Tech, ending the school's bid for a third national championship. Winston led the Spartans, averaging 18.8 points and 7.5 assists per game.

The 2020 team started the season ranked No. 1 in the AP poll for the first time in school history. Senior point guard Cassius Winston was a popular pick as the preseason player of the year. However, shortly before the season, it was announced that Josh Langford had reinjured the foot that had caused him to miss most of the prior season. Langford would not play a game for the Spartans during the season. Due in part to Langford's injury, the Spartans struggled in the non-conference schedule, losing the first game of the season to No. 2 Kentucky before losing twice more in their first eight games and falling to 5–3. MSU also struggled as Cassius Winston dealt with the suicide of his brother, Zachary, on November 10, 2020. Winston did not miss a game due to the tragedy, but did struggle for a portion of the season. MSU rebounded as Winston struggled to return to his All-American form and the Spartans did not lose again until Big Ten play after starting the conference schedule 5–0. The Spartans then lost six of their next 10 games to all but assure they would be unable to win their third straight Big Ten regular season championship. The Spartans rebounded to win their final five games and come from a three-game deficit to earn a share of their third straight Big Ten championship. As the Spartans prepared for the postseason, they were once again a popular pick to win the NCAA tournament. However, the season ended abruptly when all postseason tournaments, including the NCAA tournament, were canceled due to the COVID-19 pandemic. Cassius Winston finished his MSU career with the most assists in Big Ten history and was a consensus second team All-American for the second consecutive year.

In the COVID-19-shortened 2020–21 season, MSU began the season well, beating Duke at the Champions Classic for only the third time under Izzo. MSU finished the shortened non-conference schedule with a perfect 6–0 record and ranked No. 4 in the country. However, things changed abruptly when MSU began Big Ten play. The Spartans lost four of their first six games before pausing team activities for about two weeks due to positive COVID-19 tests in the program. Upon returning to play, MSU lost three straight dropping their conference record to 2–7 on the season and making it seem highly unlikely that they would continue the school's NCAA tournament appearance streak. Four games later, their odds had not improved as they sat at 4–9 in conference and 10–9 overall with seven games remaining. MSU, however, did the unthinkable: five of their last seven games including wins over No. 5 Illinois, No. 4 Ohio State, and No. 2 Michigan to finish the regular season with 15–11 overall record. At 9–11 in the Big Ten, MSU finished with a losing record for the first time under Izzo, but looked safe to move the NCAA tournament streak to 23 straight appearances. A loss in the second round of the Big Ten tournament marked the first time ever that the Spartans would not compete in the quarterfinals and left them on shaky ground for the NCAA tournament. The Spartans received an at-large bid to the NCAA tournament as a No. 11 seed in the South region. For the first time, MSU was forced to participate in the First Four, losing to UCLA in overtime.

Looking to rebound from one of the worst seasons in Izzo's tenure, the Spartans began the 2021–22 season with a loss to No. 3 Kansas. Following the loss, they won five straight before losing to defending national champion Baylor. They would not lose again until suffering a home loss to Northwestern ended their perfect start to conference play leaving them at 14–, 5–1 on the season. They rebounded well in the next game, winning on the road against No. 8 Wisconsin, but would lose six of their next nine games to drop to 9–7 in Big Ten play and falling out of the national polls. A win over No. 4 Purdue restored likely ensured a trip to the NCAA tournament, but the Spartans dropped two of their last three regular season games, finishing 11–9 in Big Ten play and finishing in a tie with Michigan for seventh in the conference. They beat Maryland in the second round of the Big Ten tournament before beating Wisconsin in the quarterfinals. However, their Big Ten tournament run ended in the semifinals with a loss to Purdue. The Spartans continued their streak of NCAA tournament appearances, extending it to 24 straight seasons as they received an at-large bid as the No. 7 seed in the West region. In the first round, they eked out a 74–73 win against Davidson, featuring former MSU player Foster Loyer. In the second round of the tournament, they faced Duke in what would be the final match-up between Mike Krzyzewski and Tom Izzo due to Krzyzewski's retirement after the season. MSU kept the game close and held a 70–65 with five minutes remaining before Duke outscored them 20–6 to end the game and eliminate the Spartans from the tournament.

The 2022–23 team played their second game of the season on the USS Abraham Lincoln against No. 2-ranked Gonzaga, but lost by a point. A win over Kentucky in the Champions Classic highlighted the early season. However, MSU was blown out by Alabama and Notre Dame early in the season and lost their first conference game to Northwestern. MSU recovered well, starting conference play 4–1 (12–4 overall) before losing five of their next seven games. A game scheduled to be played on campus on February 15 was canceled due to a shooting on campus the day before that killed four students. The Spartans finished the regular season 19–11, 11–8 in conference play to finish in fourth place. A loss in the quarterfinals of the Big Ten tournament preceded the team's 25th consecutive selection to the NCAA tournament. As the No. 7 seed in the East region, the Spartans defeated USC and upset No. 2-seeded Marquette to earn the school's first Sweet Sixteen appearance since 2019. In a very entertaining game, the Spartans lost to Kansas State to finish their season.

Looking to improve on the previous year's Sweet Sixteen appearance, the Spartans returned all major contributors to the team except Joey Hauser. The Spartans began the 2023–24 season ranked No. 4 in both preseason polls. However, they started the season 1–2 including a home loss in the season opener to James Madison. Another loss to No. 3-ranked Arizona and losses to Wisconsin and Nebraska in the early schedule left them at 4–5. However, the season appeared to turn around when they blew out No. 6 Baylor in Detroit and the Spartans on their next four games, moving to 9–5. The Spartans struggled early in the Big Ten season, going 1–4 before recovering to move to 9–6 in conference by the middle of February. With a win over Michigan on January 30, 2024, his 69th birthday, Tom Izzo earned his 700th career win, all at MSU. However, they lost four of their last five conference game to finish with a 10–10 conference record in a three-way tie for sixth place. As the No. 8 seed in the Big Ten tournament, MSU defeated Minnesota in the second round before losing to top-seeded Purdue in the quarterfinals. The Spartans received an at-large bid to the NCAA Tournament as the No. 9 seed in the West region, extending Izzo's record-setting streak to 26 straight tournament appearances. They easily defeated Mississippi State in the first round before losing to No. 1-seeded North Carolina to finish the season a disappointing 20–15.

The 2024–25 Spartans looked to bounce back from the prior season's disappointment. MSU started the season with two wins before losing to No. 1 Kansas in the Champions Classic. After two more wins, the Spartans participated in the Maui Invitational where they were upset in the quarterfinals by Memphis and settled for a third place finish by beating No. 12 North Carolina in overtime. From there, the Spartans went on a 13-game winning streak, starting Big Ten play 9–0 and moving to 18–2 and ranked No. 7 in the country. However, back-to-back losses to Big Ten newcomers USC and UCLA put an end to the winning streak. Freshman Jase Richardson, son of Izzo recruit Jason Richardson, took the lead for the Spartans from there, leading the Spartans in scoring in their five of their final nine regular season games. With a win over Oregon on February 8, 2025, Izzo tied Bob Knight for the most wins in conference history with 353. With a win over Illinois on February 15, Izzo passed Knight for the most wins in conference history. With a loss by rival Michigan on March 5, the Spartans secured at least a share of the Big Ten regular season championship, their first since 2020. The championship was Izzo's 11th, tying him for the all-time record with Knight and former Purdue coach Ward Lambert. With a win over Iowa on March 6, MSU secured the outright regular season championship. The championship marked the team's first outright championship since 2018. With a win over Michigan in the regular season finale on March 9, MSU earned its 17th conference win on the season, the most conference wins in school history. The Spartans finished three games ahead of second-place Maryland and Michigan in the conference. The Spartans defeated Oregon in the quarterfinals of the Big Ten tournament before losing to Wisconsin. They received an at-large bid to the NCAA tournament as the No. 2 seed in the South region marking the school's 27th consecutive tournament appearance, the nation's longest active streak. They defeated Bryant in the first round and New Mexico in the second round to advance to the Sweet Sixteen. It marked the 16th Sweet Sixteen appearance under Izzo and the school's 22nd overall. MSU defeated Ole Miss to advance to the Elite Eight where they were defeated by overall No. 1 seed Auburn. The Spartans finished the season with a record of 30–7, marking Izzo's sixth 30-win season. The Big Ten named Izzo the conference's coach of the year for the fourth time.

The 2025–26 team looked to build on their resurgent 2025 performance. Redshirt sophomore point guard Jeremy Fears Jr. had a breakout year for the Spartans continuing Izzo's strong point guard legacy. MSU started the season well, winning their first eight games of the season and moving to a No. 7 ranking. A home loss to No. 4 Duke preceded five more wins as the Spartans moved to 12–1 on the season. Following a loss to Nebraska, the Spartans won seven more in a row to return to a No. 7 ranking with a 19–2 record. With a win over USC on January 5, 2026, Tom Izzo earned his 750th career victory. Losses in three of the next four games ended the Spartans' chances to win the Big ten crown for a second consecutive year and MSU finished the regular season 25–6, 15–5 in conference play to finish in a tie for second place. With 13 assists in a loss to UCLA in the Big Ten tournament, Fears surpassed Cassius Winston for the most assists by a Spartan in a season. The Spartans received a No. 3 seed in the NCAA tournament, extending Izzo's record-setting streak to 28 consecutive tournaments. After a win in the first round over North Dakota State, Fears added 16 assists in the second game of the tournament versus Louisville in a win, setting a record for most assists by a Spartan in a tournament game. The Spartans advanced to the Sweet Sixteen for 23rd time in school history and the 17th time under Tom Izzo. There they lost to No 2-seeded and eventual national runner-up UConn.Fears was named to several All-American teams.

== Coaches ==
Three Michigan State coaches have been inducted into the Hall of Fame. They are Pete Newell (National Collegiate Basketball Hall of Fame, Class of 2006), Jud Heathcote (National Collegiate Basketball Hall of Fame, Class of 2009), and Tom Izzo (Naismith Memorial Basketball Hall of Fame, Class of 2016). Since 1976, the Spartans have had only two head basketball coaches, Heathcote and Izzo. Heathcote (1976–1995) coached the Spartans for 19 seasons before retiring following the 1994–95 season. His hand-picked successor, Izzo, an assistant with MSU since 1983, completed his 25th year as head coach of the Spartans in 2020.

On November 28, 2009, Izzo passed Heathcote's mark of 340 career wins by beating UMass 106–68. On March 6, 2022, Izzo surpassed Bob Knight for the most wins by a men's basketball coach at a Big Ten school with 663. With a win over Illinois on February 15, 2025, Izzo passed Knight for the most wins in conference history with 354. With a win over USC on January 5, 2026, Izzo earned his 750th career victory. Izzo now leads all MSU basketball coaches in wins with 764 through 2026.

Of all MSU coaches who have headed the Spartans basketball squad in at least a dozen games, Izzo is second in winning percentage and no MSU coach tops him since 1910. Former coach George E. Denman won all 11 games he coached between 1901 and 1903 and Chester L. Brewer won 70 of 95 games from 1903 to 1910.

Name	Years	Overall record	Conference record	Note
None established	1898–99	0–2 (.000)		
Charles Bemies	1899–1901	5–2 (.714)		Michigan State's first basketball coach
George Denman	1901–03	11–0 (1.000)		Michigan State's only undefeated basketball coach.
Chester Brewer	1903–10	70–25 (.737)		
John Macklin	1910–16	48–38 (.558)		
George Gauthier	1916–20	47–39 (.547)		
Lyman Frimodig	1920–22	24–20 (.545)		
Fred Walker	1922–24	20–19 (.513)		
John Kobs	1924–26	11–26 (.297)		
Benjamin Van Alstyne	1926–49	231–163 (.586)		Avg. final score increased from 28 to 46 during his tenure
Alton Kircher	1949–50	4–18 (.182)		
Pete Newell	1950–54	45–42 (.517)	26–34 (.433)	Went on to win the 1959 NCAA tournament as head coach at California; coached the U.S. to the gold medal at the 1960 Summer Olympics
Forddy Anderson	1954–65	125–124 (.502)	69–85 (.448)	Guided Michigan State to its first Final Four and NCAA appearance in 1957; 2 NCAA appearances; 2 Conference championships
John Benington	1965–69	54–38 (.587)	32–24 (.571)	Conference championship in 1967
Gus Ganakas	1969–76	89–84 (.514)	49–57 (.462)	
Jud Heathcote	1976–95	340–220 (.607)	182–160 (.532)	1979 NCAA Champions; 9 NCAA appearances; 3 conference championships
Tom Izzo	1995–Present	764–310 (.711)	375–178 (.678)	2000 NCAA Champions, 2009 National Runner-up, 8 Final Four appearances; 28 straight NCAA tournament appearances; 11 conference championships; 6 conference tournament championships
Total		1888–1170 (.617)	729–542 (.574)	2 NCAA tournament championships, 10 Final Fours, 39 NCAA tournament appearances, 17 conference championships, 6 conference tournament championships

Through April 23, 2026

=== Jud Heathcote ===
Jud Heathcote won three Big Ten titles in his 19 years at MSU. His teams appeared in nine NCAA tournaments, four Sweet Sixteens, one Elite Eight, one Final Four and won one National Championship. After his early success with Magic Johnson and company, Heathcote finished his career strong, appearing in five NCAA tournaments in his final six years. However, he never advanced past the Sweet Sixteen after winning the championship in 1979. His teams also appeared in three NITs reaching the NIT Final Four in 1989.

Heathcote was named Big Ten Coach of the Year in 1978 and 1986. Heathcote was inducted into the National Collegiate Basketball Hall of Fame, Class of 2009.

Tom Izzo worked as an assistant under Heathcote for 12 years prior to being named his successor. Other assistants who worked under Heathcote went on to head coaching positions: Don Monson (Idaho and Oregon), Bill Berry (San Jose State), Mike Deane (Siena, Marquette, Lamar, and Wagner), Jim Boylan (Chicago Bulls and Milwaukee Bucks), Jim Boylen (Utah), Stan Joplin (Toledo), and Brian Gregory (Dayton, Georgia Tech, and South Florida).

Record by season under Heathcote:

See Michigan State Spartans men's basketball seasons

=== Tom Izzo ===
Since 1995, the team has been coached by Tom Izzo, who has an overall record of 727–300 (through February 17, 2025) as the head coach at Michigan State. Izzo coached the Spartans to their second national championship in 2000 with an 89–76 victory over Florida. Izzo has turned Michigan State into a perennial basketball powerhouse.

On March 15, 2019, Izzo won his 600th game. On March 8, 2022, Izzo surpassed Bob Knight for the most wins by a men's basketball coach at a Big Ten school, with 663. On January 30, 2024, also his 69th birthday, Izzo won his 700th game by beating rival Michigan 81–62. Izzo set the record for most conference wins on February 15, 2025, with 354.

Izzo was elected to the Naismith Memorial Basketball Hall of Fame in 2014.

Izzo has guided the Spartans to eight NCAA Final Fours since 1999, an accomplishment unmatched by any other college basketball program during that span. Izzo has never had a losing season at MSU and has also appeared in a postseason tournament every year he has headed the MSU basketball program: two years in the National Invitation Tournament and 28 straight appearances in the NCAA tournament. His teams have won 11 Big Ten regular season championships, six Big Ten tournament championships and have reached the Sweet Sixteen 20 times, the Elite Eight 14 times, the Final Four eight times, and played in two NCAA Championship games. His 2000 team won the NCAA National Championship.

Izzo has received numerous awards including the 1998 Associated Press National Coach of the Year, the 1998 Basketball News National Coach of the Year, the 1998 United States Basketball Writers Association Henry Iba Coach of the Year Award (1998), four-time Big Ten Conference Coach of the Year (1998, 2009, 2012, 2025), the 1998 Basketball Times Mideast Coach of the Year, the 1999 Basketball News Coach of the Year Award, two-time National Association of Basketball Coaches Coach of the Year Award (2001, 2012) and the 2005 Clair Bee Award.

Numerous assistant coaches under Izzo have gone to be head coaches at other schools. Tom Crean, the former head coach at Georgia, was head coach at Indiana and Marquette for nine years each. Brian Gregory coached for Dayton, Georgia Tech and South Florida. Former assistant coach Mike Garland spent three seasons as head coach at Cleveland State following an initial seven-year stint as an assistant at MSU. Former assistant Stan Heath was head coach at Kent State, Arkansas, and South Florida. Current associate head coach Doug Wojcik was the head coach at Tulsa and College of Charleston. Longtime assistant Dwayne Stephens was named head coach at Western Michigan in 2022. Mark Montgomery was the head coach at Northern Illinois from 2011 to 2021 and was named head coach of Detroit Mercy in 2024. Several former assistants, including Garland, Montgomery, and Wojcik have returned to assistant roles under Izzo after being fired from head coaching positions.

== Season-by-season results ==
Under Tom Izzo:

Record table
Season	Team	Overall	Conference	Standing	Postseason
Tom Izzo (Big Ten Conference) (1995–present)
1995–96	Tom Izzo	16–16	9–9	7th	NIT second round
1996–97	Tom Izzo	17–12	9–9	T–6th	NIT second round
1997–98	Tom Izzo	22–8	13–3	T–1st	NCAA Sweet Sixteen
1998–99	Tom Izzo	33–5	15–1	1st	NCAA Final Four
1999–2000	Tom Izzo	32–7	13–3	T–1st	NCAA champion
2000–01	Tom Izzo	28–5	13–3	T–1st	NCAA Final Four
2001–02	Tom Izzo	19–12	10–6	5th	NCAA first round
2002–03	Tom Izzo	22–13	10–6	T–3rd	NCAA Elite Eight
2003–04	Tom Izzo	18–12	12–4	T–2nd	NCAA first round
2004–05	Tom Izzo	26–7	13–3	2nd	NCAA Final Four
2005–06	Tom Izzo	22–12	8–8	T–6th	NCAA first round
2006–07	Tom Izzo	23–12	8–8	T–7th	NCAA second round
2007–08	Tom Izzo	27–9	12–6	4th	NCAA Sweet Sixteen
2008–09	Tom Izzo	31–7	15–3	1st	NCAA Runner-up
2009–10	Tom Izzo	28–9	14–4	T–1st	NCAA Final Four
2010–11	Tom Izzo	19–15	9–9	T–4th	NCAA second round
2011–12	Tom Izzo	29–8	13–5	T–1st	NCAA Sweet Sixteen
2012–13	Tom Izzo	27–9	13–5	T–2nd	NCAA Sweet Sixteen
2013–14	Tom Izzo	29–9	12–6	T–2nd	NCAA Elite Eight
2014–15	Tom Izzo	27–12	12–6	T–3rd	NCAA Final Four
2015–16	Tom Izzo	29–6	13–5	2nd	NCAA first round
2016–17	Tom Izzo	20–15	10–8	T–5th	NCAA second round
2017–18	Tom Izzo	30–5	16–2	1st	NCAA second round
2018–19	Tom Izzo	32–7	16–4	T–1st	NCAA Final Four
2019–20	Tom Izzo	22–9	14–6	T–1st	No postseason due to COVID-19 pandemic
2020–21	Tom Izzo	15–13	9–11	T–8th	NCAA First Four
2021–22	Tom Izzo	23–13	11–9	T–7th	NCAA second round
2022–23	Tom Izzo	21–13	11–8	4th	NCAA Sweet Sixteen
2023–24	Tom Izzo	20–15	10–10	T–6th	NCAA second round
2024–25	Tom Izzo	30–7	17–3	1st	NCAA Elite Eight
2025–26	Tom Izzo	27–8	15–5	T–2nd	NCAA Sweet Sixteen
Tom Izzo:		764–310 (.711)	375–178 (.678)		
Total:		1,888–1,170 (.617)			
National champion Postseason invitational champion Conference regular season champion Conference regular season and conference tournament champion Division regular season champion Division regular season and conference tournament champion Conference tournament champion

== Postseason history ==
=== NCAA tournament ===
The Spartans have appeared in 39 NCAA Division I men's basketball tournaments, with a current streak of 28 straight years, with two NCAA basketball national championships. They have appeared in ten Final Fours and sport a 78–38 all-time NCAA tournament record.

==== National championships ====
Season	Coach	Opponent	Score	Site	Overall record	Big Ten record
1978–79	Jud Heathcote	Indiana State	75–64	Salt Lake City, UT	25–6	13–5
1999–2000	Tom Izzo	Florida	89–76	Indianapolis, IN	31–7	13–3
National championships					2

1979 NCAA tournament results
Round	Opponent	Score
First round	Bye
Second round	No. 10 Lamar	95–64
Sweet Sixteen	No. 3 LSU	87–71
Elite Eight	No. 1 Notre Dame	80–68
Final Four	No. 9 Penn	101–67
Championship	No. 1 Indiana State	75–64

2000 NCAA tournament results
Round	Opponent	Score
First round	No. 16 Valparaiso	65–38
Second round	No. 8 Utah	73–61
Sweet Sixteen	No. 4 Syracuse	75–58
Elite Eight	No. 2 Iowa State	75–64
Final Four	No. 8 Wisconsin	53–41
Championship	No. 5 Florida	89–76

==== Complete NCAA tournament results ====
The Spartans have appeared in the NCAA tournament 39 times. Their combined record is 78–38.

Year	Seed	Round	Opponent	Result
1957		Sweet Sixteen; Elite Eight; Final Four; National third-place game	Notre Dame; Kentucky; North Carolina; San Francisco	W 85–83; W 80–68; L 70–74 ^{3OT} L 60–67
1959		Sweet Sixteen; Elite Eight	Marquette; Louisville	W 74–69; L 81–88
1978		First Round; Sweet Sixteen; Elite Eight	Providence; WKU; Kentucky	W 77–63; W 90–69; L 49–52
1979	No. 2	Second Round; Sweet Sixteen; Elite Eight; Final Four; National championship game	No. 10 Lamar; No. 3 LSU; No. 1 Notre Dame; No. 9 Penn; No. 1 Indiana State	W 95–64; W 87–71; W 80–68; W 101–67; W 75–64
1985	No. 10	First Round	No. 7 UAB	L 68–70
1986	No. 5	First Round; Second Round; Sweet Sixteen	No. 12 Washington; No. 4 Georgetown; No. 1 Kansas	W 72–70; W 80–68; L 86–96 ^{OT}
1990	No. 1	First Round; Second Round; Sweet Sixteen	No. 16 Murray State; No. 9 UC Santa Barbara; No. 4 Georgia Tech	W 75–71 ^{OT} W 62–58; L 80–81 ^{OT}
1991	No. 5	First Round; Second Round	No. 12 Green Bay; No. 4 Utah	W 60–58; L 84–85 ^{2OT}
1992	No. 5	First Round; Second Round	No. 12 SW Missouri State; No. 4 Cincinnati	W 61–54; L 65–77
1994	No. 7	First Round; Second round	No. 10 Seton Hall; No. 2 Duke	W 84–73; L 74–85
1995	No. 3	First Round	No. 14 Weber State	L 72–79
1998	No. 4	First Round; Second Round; Sweet Sixteen	No. 13 Eastern Michigan; No. 5 Princeton; No. 1 North Carolina	W 83–71; W 63–56; L 58–73
1999	No. 1	First Round; Second Round; Sweet Sixteen; Elite Eight; Final Four	No. 16 Mount St. Mary's; No. 9 Ole Miss; No. 13 Oklahoma; No. 3 Kentucky; No. 1 Duke	W 76–53; W 74–66; W 54–46; W 73–66; L 62–68
2000	No. 1	First Round; Second Round; Sweet Sixteen; Elite Eight; Final Four; National championship game	No. 16 Valparaiso; No. 8 Utah; No. 4 Syracuse; No. 2 Iowa State; No. 8 Wisconsin; No. 5 Florida	W 65–38; W 73–61; W 75–58; W 75–64; W 53–41; W 89–76
2001	No. 1	First Round; Second Round; Sweet Sixteen; Elite Eight; Final Four	No. 16 Alabama State; No. 9 Fresno State; No. 12 Gonzaga; No. 11 Temple; No. 2 Arizona	W 69–35; W 81–65; W 77–62; W 69–62; L 61–80
2002	No. 10	First Round	No. 7 NC State	L 58–69
2003	No. 7	First Round; Second Round; Sweet Sixteen; Elite Eight	No. 10 Colorado; No. 2 Florida; No. 6 Maryland; No. 1 Texas	W 79–64; W 68–46; W 60–58; L 76–85
2004	No. 7	First Round	No. 10 Nevada	L 66–72
2005	No. 5	First Round; Second Round; Sweet Sixteen; Elite Eight; Final Four	No. 12 Old Dominion; No. 13 Vermont; No. 1 Duke; No. 2 Kentucky; No. 1 North Carolina	W 89–81; W 72–61; W 78–68; W 94–88 ^{2OT} L 71–87
2006	No. 6	First Round	No. 11 George Mason	L 65–75
2007	No. 9	First Round; Second Round	No. 8 Marquette; No. 1 North Carolina	W 61–49; L 67–81
2008	No. 5	First Round; Second Round; Sweet Sixteen	No. 12 Temple; No. 4 Pittsburgh; No. 1 Memphis	W 72–61; W 65–54; L 74–92
2009	No. 2	First Round; Second Round; Sweet Sixteen; Elite Eight; Final Four; National championship game	No. 15 Robert Morris; No. 10 USC; No. 3 Kansas; No. 1 Louisville; No. 1 Connecticut; No. 1 North Carolina	W 77–62; W 74–69; W 67–62; W 64–52; W 82–73; L 72–89
2010	No. 5	First Round; Second Round; Sweet Sixteen; Elite Eight; Final Four	No. 12 New Mexico State; No. 4 Maryland; No. 9 Northern Iowa; No. 6 Tennessee; No. 5 Butler	W 70–67; W 85–83; W 59–52; W 70–69; L 50–52
2011	No. 10	First Round	No. 7 UCLA	L 76–78
2012	No. 1	First Round; Second Round; Sweet Sixteen	No. 16 Long Island; No. 9 Saint Louis; No. 4 Louisville	W 89–67; W 65–61; L 44–57
2013	No. 3	Second Round; Third Round; Sweet Sixteen	No. 14 Valparaiso; No. 6 Memphis; No. 2 Duke	W 65–54; W 70–48; L 61–71
2014	No. 4	Second Round; Third Round; Sweet Sixteen; Elite Eight	No. 13 Delaware; No. 12 Harvard; No. 1 Virginia; No. 7 Connecticut	W 93–78; W 80–73; W 61–59; L 54–60
2015	No. 7	Second Round; Third Round; Sweet Sixteen; Elite Eight; Final Four	No. 10 Georgia; No. 2 Virginia; No. 3 Oklahoma; No. 4 Louisville; No. 1 Duke	W 70–63; W 60–54; W 62–58; W 76–70 ^{OT} L 61–81
2016	No. 2	First Round	No. 15 Middle Tennessee	L 81–90
2017	No. 9	First Round; Second Round	No. 8 Miami; No. 1 Kansas	W 78–58; L 70–90
2018	No. 3	First Round; Second Round	No. 14 Bucknell; No. 11 Syracuse	W 82–78; L 53–55
2019	No. 2	First Round; Second Round; Sweet Sixteen; Elite Eight; Final Four	No. 15 Bradley; No. 10 Minnesota; No. 3 LSU; No. 1 Duke; No. 3 Texas Tech	W 76–65; W 70–50; W 80–63; W 68–67; L 51–61
2021	No. 11	First Four	No. 11 UCLA	L 80–86^{OT}
2022	No. 7	First Round; Second Round	No. 10 Davidson; No. 2 Duke	W 74–73; L 76–85
2023	No. 7	First Round; Second Round; Sweet Sixteen	No. 10 USC; No. 2 Marquette; No. 3 Kansas State	W 72–62; W 69–60; L 93–98 ^{OT}
2024	No. 9	First Round; Second Round	No. 8 Mississippi State; No. 1 North Carolina	W 69–51; L 69–85
2025	No. 2	First Round; Second Round; Sweet Sixteen; Elite Eight	No. 15 Bryant; No. 10 New Mexico; No. 6 Ole Miss; No. 1 Auburn	W 87–62; W 71–63; W 73–70; L 64–70
2026	No. 3	First Round; Second Round; Sweet Sixteen	No. 14 North Dakota State; No. 6 Louisville; No. 2 UConn	W 92–67; W 77–68; L 63–67

==== NCAA tournament history and seeds ====
The NCAA began seeding the tournament with the 1979 edition. The Spartans have received a No. 1 seed in five Tournaments. Their average seed in the NCAA tournament is a 4.7. They have been a No. 5 seed the most times (six). The lowest seed the Spartans have received in the Tournament is 11.

Prior to seeding in NCAA tournaments, MSU appeared in the 1957, 1959, and 1978 NCAA tournaments. Since 1979, the Spartans have failed to qualify for the tournament 11 times. They have a current streak of 28 straight appearances in the tournament (as of 2026).

Years	'79	'85	'86	'90	'91	'92	'94	'95	'98	'99	'00	'01	'02	'03	'04	'05	'06	'07	'08	'09	'10	'11	'12	'13	'14	'15	'16	'17	'18	'19	'21	'22	'23	'24	'25	'26
Seeds	2*	10	5	1	5	5	7	3	4	1	1*	1	10	7	7	5	6	9	5	2	5	10	1	3	4	7	2	9	3	2	11	7	7	9	2	3

*Won National Championship

The Spartans have appeared in 39 NCAA tournaments, reaching the Sweet Sixteen 23 times, the Elite Eight 15 times, the Final Four 10 times, and the national championship game three times. They have reached the Final Four three times as a No. 1 seed, three times as a No. 2 seed, twice as a No. 5 seed, and once as a No. 7 seed. They won the National Championship as a No. 2 seed in 1979 and as a No. 1 seed in 2000.

=== NIT results ===
The Spartans have appeared in the National Invitation Tournament (NIT) five times. Their combined record is 6–6.

Year	Round	Opponent	Result
1983	First Round; Second Round	Bowling Green; Fresno State	W 72–71; L 58–72
1989	First Round; Second Round; Quarterfinals; Semifinals; 3rd-place game	Kent State; Wichita State; Villanova; Saint Louis; UAB	W 83–69; W 79–67; W 70–63; L 64–74; L 76–78
1993	First Round	Oklahoma	L 86–88
1996	First Round; Second Round	Washington; Fresno State	W 64–50; L 70–80
1997	First Round; Second Round	George Washington; Florida State	W 65–50; L 63–68

=== Big Ten regular-season championships ===
Michigan State has won 17 Big Ten regular-season championships, the sixth-most in Big Ten history.

Season	Coach	Overall record	Big Ten record
1956–57	Forddy Anderson	16–10	10–4
1958–59	Forddy Anderson	19–4	13–3
1966–67	John Benington	16–7	10–4
1977–78	Jud Heathcote	25–5	15–3
1978–79	Jud Heathcote	26–6	13–5
1989–90	Jud Heathcote	28–6	15–3
1997–98	Tom Izzo	22–8	13–3
1998–99	Tom Izzo	33–5	15–1
1999–2000	Tom Izzo	32–7	13–3
2000–01	Tom Izzo	28–5	13–3
2008–09	Tom Izzo	31–7	15–3
2009–10	Tom Izzo	28–9	14–4
2011–12	Tom Izzo	29–8	13–5
2017–18	Tom Izzo	30–5	16–2
2018–19	Tom Izzo	32–7	16–4
2019–20	Tom Izzo	22–9	14–6
2024–25	Tom Izzo	30–7	17–3
Big Ten regular season championships			17

=== Big Ten tournament championships ===
Michigan State has won six Big Ten tournament championships since its inception in 1998, the most championships in the Big Ten. The Spartans have appeared in seven championship games, only losing the 2015 championship to Wisconsin. Michigan State had appeared in the quarterfinals of every Big Ten tournament until 2021.

Season	Seed	Opponent	Score	Site	Most Valuable Player
1998–99	1	No. 11 Illinois	67–50	United Center, Chicago, IL	Mateen Cleaves
1999–2000	2	No. 4 Illinois	76–61	United Center, Chicago, IL	Morris Peterson
2011–12	1	No. 3 Ohio State	68–64	Conseco Fieldhouse, Indianapolis, IN	Draymond Green
2013–14	3	No. 1 Michigan	69–55	Bankers Life Fieldhouse, Indianapolis, IN	Branden Dawson
2015–16	2	No. 4 Purdue	66–62	Bankers Life Fieldhouse, Indianapolis, IN	Denzel Valentine
2018–19	1	No. 3 Michigan	65–60	United Center, Chicago, IL	Cassius Winston
Big Ten tournament Championships					6

== Record vs. Big Ten opponents ==
*Through 2023–24 season

Michigan State only has losing records against four Big Ten teams.

Opponent	Wins	Losses	Pct.	Streak
Illinois	66	63	.512	W1
Indiana	60	73	.451	L1
Iowa	77	60	.562	L2
Maryland	16	8	.667	W6
Michigan	90	105	.462	L1
Minnesota	76	62	.551	L1
Nebraska	23	10	.697	L1
Northwestern	95	42	.693	W1
Ohio State	81	63	.563	W1
Oregon	2	2	.500	W2
Penn State	45	10	.818	W3
Purdue	58	76	.433	W1
Rutgers	13	3	.867	W1
UCLA	4	7	.364	L1
USC	4	3	.571	W1
Washington	4	2	.667	W4
Wisconsin	86	69	.555	L2

== Spartans of note ==
=== Retired numbers ===
Michigan State Spartans retired numbers
No.	Player	Position	Tenure	Date # ret.	Ref.
4	Scott Skiles	PG	1982–86	November 13, 1998	
12	Mateen Cleaves	G	1996–2000	February 3, 2007	
21	Steve Smith	SG	1987–91	January 2, 1999	
23	Draymond Green	PF	2008–12	December 3, 2019	
24	Johnny Green	SF	1955–58		
24	Shawn Respert	PG	1991–95	November 28, 1998	
31	Jay Vincent	SF	1978–81	January 9, 1999	
32	Greg Kelser	SF	1976–79	1979	
33	Magic Johnson	PG	1977–79	January 15, 1989	
42	Morris Peterson	SG, SF	1995–2000	January 17, 2009	
–	Jud Heathcote	Head coach	1976–95		

=== National Player of the Year ===
- Scott Skiles – Basketball Times (1986)
- Shawn Respert – Sporting News, NABC (1995)
- Draymond Green – NABC (2012)
- Denzel Valentine – AP, USA Today, Sports Illustrated, Basketball Times, NABC, NBC Sports (2016)

=== Consensus All-Americans ===
==== Consensus First Team ====
- Magic Johnson (1979)
- Shawn Respert (1995)
- Mateen Cleaves (1999)
- Draymond Green (2012)
- Denzel Valentine (2016)

==== Consensus Second Team ====
- Johnny Green (1959)
- Scott Skiles (1986)
- Steve Smith (1991)
- Mateen Cleaves (1998, 2000)
- Morris Peterson (2000)
- Jason Richardson (2001)
- Miles Bridges (2018)
- Cassius Winston (2019, 2020)

=== Final Four Most Outstanding Player ===
- Earvin Johnson (1979)
- Mateen Cleaves (2000)

=== Big Ten Player of the Year ===
- Jay Vincent (1981)
- Scott Skiles (1986)
- Shawn Respert (1995)
- Mateen Cleaves (1998, 1999)
- Morris Peterson (2000)
- Kalin Lucas (2009)
- Draymond Green (2012)
- Denzel Valentine (2016)
- Cassius Winston (2019)

=== Big Ten Coach of the Year ===
- Jud Heathcote (1978, 1986)
- Tom Izzo (1998, 2009, 2012, 2025)

=== Big Ten Freshman of the Year ===
- Gary Harris (2013)
- Miles Bridges (2017)
- Jaren Jackson Jr. (2018)

=== Big Ten Defensive Player of the Year ===
- Ken Redfield (1990)
- Eric Snow (1995)
- Travis Walton (2009)
- Jaren Jackson Jr. (2018)
- Xavier Tillman (2020)

=== Spartans in the NBA ===
Spartans formerly in the NBA include:

- Maurice Ager
- Mathew Aitch
- Robert Anderegg
- Alan Anderson
- Keith Appling
- Chet Aubuchon
- Charlie Bell
- Robert Brannum
- Shannon Brown
- Edward Burton
- Mateen Cleaves
- Matt Costello
- Paul Davis
- Branden Dawson
- Jamie Feick
- Al Ferrari
- Terry Furlow
- Johnny Green
- Darryl Johnson
- Earvin Johnson
- Ken Johnson
- Greg Kelser
- Kalin Lucas
- Matthew Mazza
- Anthony Miller
- Mike Peplowski
- Morris Peterson
- Zach Randolph
- Shawn Respert
- Jason Richardson
- Ralph Simpson
- Scott Skiles
- Steve Smith
- Eric Snow
- Matt Steigenga
- Jay Vincent
- Sam Vincent
- Horace Walker
- Kevin Willis

Spartans currently in the NBA, G-League, unsigned, or are active in other professional leagues include:

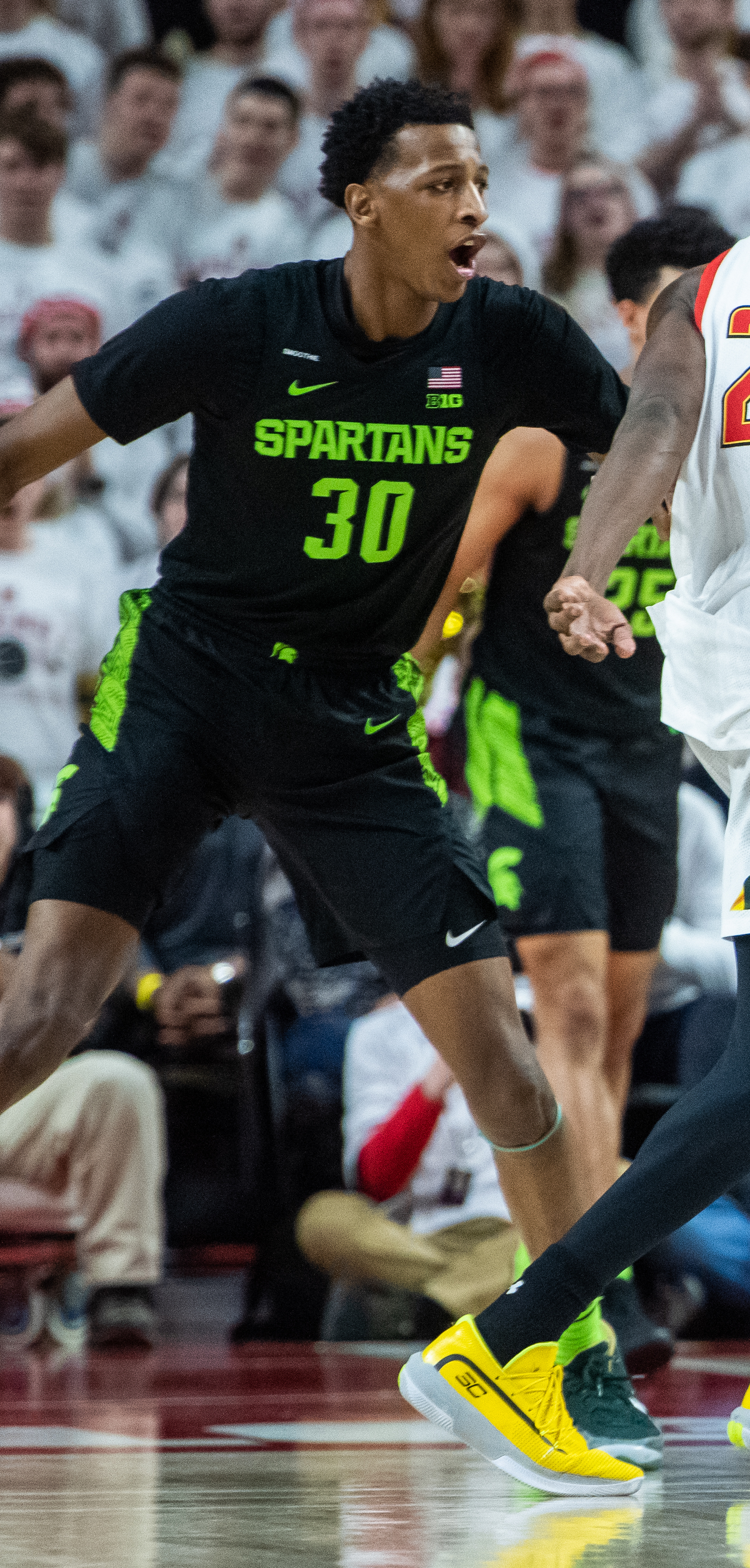
Marcus Bingham Jr.

- Marcus Bingham Jr. (Hapoel Haifa)
- Miles Bridges (Phoenix Suns)
- Gabe Brown (Pallacanestro Varese)
- Max Christie (Dallas Mavericks)
- Matt Costello (Cazoo Baskonia)
- Draymond Green (Golden State Warriors)
- Gary Harris (Detroit Pistons)
- Aaron Henry (Toyotsu Fighting Eagles Nagoya)
- Bryn Forbes (Râmnicu Vâlcea)
- Jaren Jackson Jr. (Utah Jazz)
- Deyonta Davis (Taichung Suns)
- Kenny Goins (BC Pieno žvaigždės)
- Malik Hall (Ironi Kiryat Ata)
- Gavin Schilling (Konyaspor)
- Durrell Summers (Mineros de Zacatecas)
- Xavier Tillman (Trabzonspor)
- Travis Trice (UCAM Murcia)
- Denzel Valentine (Sydney Kings)
- Nick Ward (Vancouver Bandits)
- Cassius Winston (Hapoel Jerusalem)

==== Draft history ====
- 67 total NBA draft picks
- 22 first round picks
- 1 overall No. 1 pick – Magic Johnson
- 8 top ten picks

Year	Round	Pick	Player	Team
1952	8	75	Gordon Stauffer	Indianapolis Olympians
1955	3	15	Al Ferrari	Milwaukee Bucks
1955	12	87	Bob Armstrong	Rochester Royals
1956	7	50	Julius McCoy	St. Louis Hawks
1957	7	51	George Ferguson	Milwaukee Bucks
1958	8	58	Jack Quiggle	Detroit Pistons
1959	1	5	Johnny Green	New York Knicks
1959	3	20	Bob Anderegg	New York Knicks
1960	4	30	Horace Walker	St. Louis Hawks
1964	14	96	Pete Gent	Baltimore Bullets
1966	11	48	Stan Washington	Los Angeles Lakers
1966	13	77	Bill Curtis	Chicago Bulls
1967	4	114	Charles Smith	Baltimore Bullets
1967	5	135	Matthew Aitch	Detroit Pistons
1969	4	50	Lee Lafayette	San Francisco Warriors
1971	5	75	Rudy Benjamin	San Diego Rockets
1972	1	11	Ralph Simpson	Chicago Bulls
1973	9	145	Bill Kilgore	Detroit Pistons
1974	7	111	Mike Robinson	Cleveland Cavaliers
1975	4	64	Lindsay Hairston	Detroit Pistons
1976	1	12	Terry Furlow	Philadelphia 76ers
1977	5	97	Bob Chapman	Kansas City Kings
1979	1	1	Earvin Johnson	Los Angeles Lakers
1979	1	4	Greg Kelser	Detroit Pistons
1980	4	74	Ron Charles	Chicago Bulls
1981	2	24	Jay Vincent	Dallas Mavericks
1981	8	181	Mike Brkovich	Milwaukee Bucks
1982	9	193	Kevin Smith	Detroit Pistons
1983	6	124	Derek Perry	Detroit Pistons
1984	1	11	Kevin Willis	Atlanta Hawks
1984	9	203	Ben Tower	Detroit Pistons
1985	1	20	Sam Vincent	Boston Celtics
1985	2	28	Ken Johnson	Portland Trail Blazers
1986	1	22	Scott Skiles	Milwaukee Bucks
1986	7	155	Larry Polec	Detroit Pistons
1987	3	58	Darryl Johnson	Golden State Warriors
1987	5	97	Vernon Carr	Sacramento Kings
1991	1	5	Steve Smith	Miami Heat
1992	2	52	Matt Steigenga	Chicago Bulls
1993	2	52	Mike Peplowski	Sacramento Kings
1994	2	39	Anthony Miller	Golden State Warriors
1995	1	8	Shawn Respert	Portland Trail Blazers
1995	2	43	Eric Snow	Milwaukee Bucks
1996	2	48	Jamie Feick	Philadelphia 76ers
2000	1	14	Mateen Cleaves	Detroit Pistons
2000	1	21	Morris Peterson	Toronto Raptors
2001	1	5	Jason Richardson	Golden State Warriors
2001	1	19	Zach Randolph	Portland Trail Blazers
2001	2	51	Andre Hutson	Milwaukee Bucks
2002	2	51	Marcus Taylor	Minnesota Timberwolves
2005	2	46	Erazem Lorbek	Indiana Pacers
2006	1	25	Shannon Brown	Cleveland Cavaliers
2006	1	28	Maurice Ager	Dallas Mavericks
2006	2	34	Paul Davis	Los Angeles Clippers
2009	2	50	Goran Suton	Utah Jazz
2012	2	35	Draymond Green	Golden State Warriors
2014	1	15	Adreian Payne	Atlanta Hawks
2014	1	19	Gary Harris	Chicago Bulls
2015	2	56	Branden Dawson	New Orleans Pelicans
2016	1	14	Denzel Valentine	Chicago Bulls
2016	2	31	Deyonta Davis	Boston Celtics
2018	1	4	Jaren Jackson Jr.	Memphis Grizzlies
2018	1	12	Miles Bridges	Los Angeles Clippers
2020	2	35	Xavier Tillman	Sacramento Kings
2020	2	53	Cassius Winston	Oklahoma City Thunder
2022	2	35	Max Christie	Los Angeles Lakers
2025	1	25	Jase Richardson	Orlando Magic

== Uniforms ==
Tom Izzo's teams have worn many different styles of uniform during his 31 years at Michigan State. Nike, Inc. started making jerseys for the team at the start of the 2000–01 season.

The current home jersey, introduced as part of a rebranding effort by the athletic department in April 2010, is white with green uniform numbers and a green custom font "SPARTANS" across the chest. The road jersey is green with white uniform numbers and a white custom font "SPARTANS" across the chest. The Spartans do not currently wear an official alternate uniform but the team has worn a silver alternate, a 1979 throwback, a 2000 throwback, and a MAC (Michigan Agricultural College) uniform in the past. The team also wore specially made camouflage jerseys for the 2011 Carrier Classic, played on a U.S. Navy aircraft carrier against North Carolina. Beginning in the 2014–15 season, the Spartans frequently wore their 1979 throwback jerseys as their home uniform. On January 23, 2016, MSU wore specially designed "Mean Green" uniforms. During the 2016–17 season, the Spartans frequently wore the MAC throwback uniforms at home.

== Facilities ==
The Spartans used the College Gymnasium prior to moving to Demonstration Hall for 10 years.

=== Demonstration Hall ===
The Spartans used this building, still in use on campus today, as their home from 1930 to the opening of Jenison Fieldhouse in 1940.

=== Jenison Fieldhouse ===
The arena opened in 1940 and was named for alumnus Frederick Cowles Jenison, whose estate, along with PWAP funds, funded the building. The building was the home of the Spartans from 1940 to 1989 when the Breslin Center opened.

The venue is most famous for its 1979 NCAA champion basketball team, which included Earvin "Magic" Johnson, and was coached by Jud Heathcote.

Jenison also hosted the 1963 NCAA tournament's Mideast Regionals. A plaque outside the arena commemorates one of the 1963 regional semifinals; the "Game of Change," in which a segregated Mississippi State team played and lost to the eventual national champion, an integrated Loyola team. The losing Maroons (now known as the Bulldogs) had defied a court order prohibiting them from leaving the state to play an integrated team. The game is now seen as a watershed moment in the intersection of civil rights and sports during the Civil Rights Movement.

The building is still in use on campus today.

=== Breslin Center ===
The Spartans play home games at the Jack Breslin Student Events Center on campus. The arena is commonly referred to as "Breslin" and "the Bres", and was opened in 1989. It is named for Jacweir "Jack" Breslin, an MSU alumnus, former athlete and administrator, who first began pushing for the arena in 1969. Its capacity is 14,797 seats, and the stadium superseded Jenison Fieldhouse.

The arena's current basketball court is the same floor where the Spartans won the 2000 NCAA tournament, which was at the RCA Dome in Indianapolis. The school purchased the floor from the NCAA and Final Four floor installer Horner Flooring after the title game. A plaque was installed on the baseline near the Michigan State tunnel to commemorate the floor's role in the school's history.

The Breslin Center is home to the Izzone, a large student section named after Coach Izzo, the basketball team's head coach since 1995. The student section had been named Spartan Spirits and Jud's Jungle prior to Izzo's prominence at the school. The Izzone routinely gets mentioned in discussions of the nation's top student fan sections, and in 2006 was ranked as the 4th-best in the country. The section helped cheer the Spartans to a 53-game home win streak between 1998 and 2002 and also a 28-game winning streak from 2007 and 2009.

The arena underwent a $50 million renovation to improve the visitor experience and to create a Michigan State University Basketball Hall of History.
