= John Macklin =

American football player and sports coach (1883–1949)

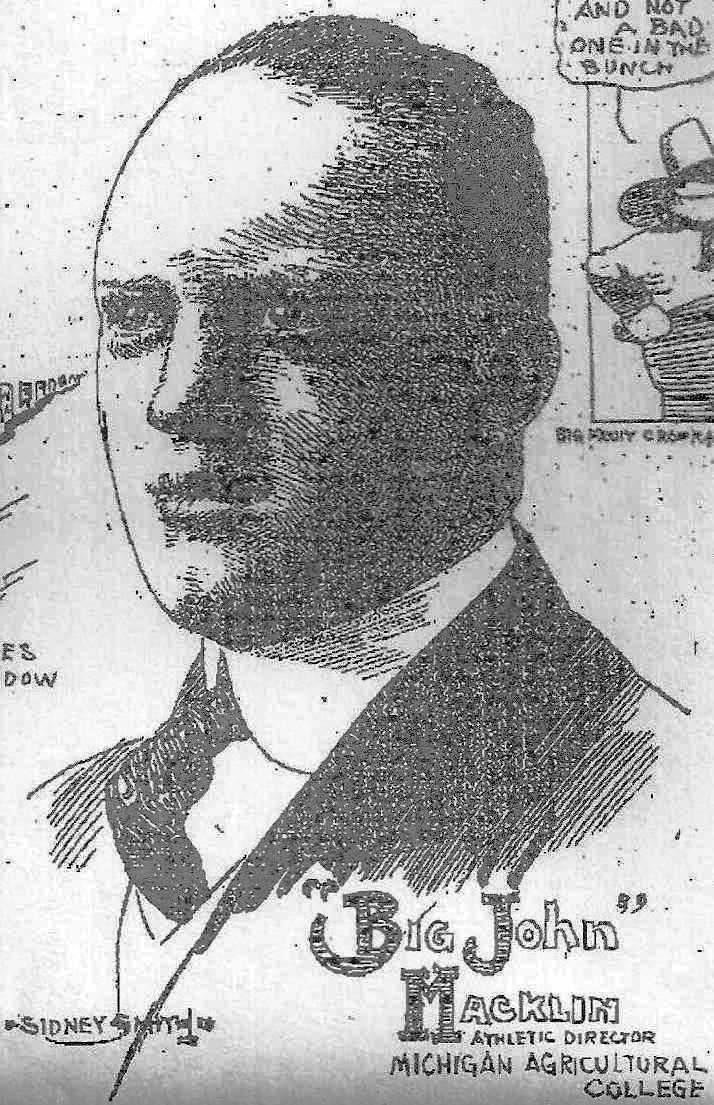
- "Big John" Macklin, as depicted in the Chicago Daily Tribune, November 30, 1915

Biographical details
- Born: October 17, 1883; Worcester, Massachusetts, U.S.
- Died: October 10, 1949; Philadelphia, Pennsylvania, U.S.

Playing career

Football
- 1907–1908: Penn

Coaching career (HC unless noted)

Football
- 1911–1915: Michigan Agricultural

Basketball
- 1910–1916: Michigan Agricultural

Baseball
- 1911–1915: Michigan Agricultural

Head coaching record
- Overall: 29–5 (football); 48–38 (basketball); 52–27 (baseball)

John Farrell "Big John" Macklin (October 17, 1883 – October 10, 1949) was an American football player, coach of football, basketball, baseball and track and field, and a college athletics administrator. He served as the head football coach at Michigan Agricultural College, now Michigan State University from 1911 to 1915. With a five-year record of 29–5, he has the highest winning percentage of any football coach in Michigan State history. Macklin coached the Michigan State Spartans football team to its first ever victories over Ohio State, Michigan, Wisconsin, and Penn State. He was also the athletic director at Michigan Agricultural and coached the school's basketball, baseball, and track and field teams. Macklin tallied marks of 48–38 as head basketball coach (1910–1916) and 52–27 as head baseball coach (1911–1915).

== Biography ==
=== Early years ===
Macklin was born in Worcester, Massachusetts and attended Worcester High School. He played high school football for four years and was also the captain of Worcester's crew. After graduating from Worcester High School, Macklin attended Exeter Academy in Exeter, New Hampshire and then St. Paul's School in Concord, New Hampshire, playing football at each school.

=== Penn ===
After completing his preparatory education, Macklin enrolled at the University of Pennsylvania. Macklin grew to be a giant of a man for his time. He was 6 feet, 7 inches tall and weighed 275 pounds. When Macklin arrived at Penn, one account indicates there were no uniforms large enough to fit him: "When the big husky appeared on the gridiron the first thing the coaches did was to send for the athletic outfitter, for there was not a suit on the campus that would encompass his frame." Macklin played two years at the tackle position for Penn's football team. The Chicago Daily Tribune later wrote: "For a big man he was remarkably agile and his tackling on the wings and his quickness in getting through to break up plays was the delight of the coaches."

=== Coaching career ===
In 1910, Macklin coached football at a boys' school at Pawling, New York. Macklin's success at Pawling brought him to the attention of Michigan Agricultural College (now Michigan State University), which was in need of a new athletic director and coach. He was hired in January 1911 upon the recommendation of the renowned Penn athletic trainer Mike Murphy. Macklin was the head coach at Michigan State 1911 to 1915 and compiled a record of 29–5. His winning percentage of .853 is the highest in the history of the Michigan State Spartans football program. Macklin's 1913 Michigan State team finished with an undefeated, untied record of 7–0 and outscored opponents by a combined score of 180 to 28. Macklin was the first Michigan State coach to lead the Spartans to football victories over Ohio State (35–20 in 1912), Michigan (12–7 in 1913), Wisconsin (12–7 in 1913), and Penn State (6–3 in 1914). Macklin's 1913 team was also the first racially integrated team in the school's history, as Gideon Smith became the first African-American player for the Spartans.

Macklin was also the athletic director and coach of the baseball, men's basketball, and track and field teams. He coached the basketball team from 1910 to 1916 and compiled a 48–38 (.558) record, including a 12–3 record for 1911–12 season. He coached the baseball team from 1911 to 1915, compiling a record of 52–27 (.658).

Macklin retired from coaching in March 1916 to enter the coal mining business in Pennsylvania.

=== Later years and honors ===
The Associated Press in 1949 called Macklin "the founding father of the big time at Michigan State College." When he was hired in 1911, the school was putting on games for $200. When he left, the school received guarantees of $10,000 for games. As athletic director, he also led the effort to build new athletic buildings and a modern gymnasium. In 1935, Michigan State renamed its football stadium Macklin Field in his honor. At the time, Macklin was a coal mine operator living in Philadelphia, Pennsylvania. The name was changed to Macklin Stadium in 1948, and in 1957, Macklin's name was dropped and replaced by the current name, Spartan Stadium.

Macklin died at his home in the suburbs of Philadelphia at age 65.

== Head coaching record ==
=== Football ===
Year	Team	Overall	Conference	Standing	Bowl/playoffs
Michigan Agricultural Aggies (Independent) (1911–1915)
1911	Michigan Agricultural	5–1			
1912	Michigan Agricultural	7–1			
1913	Michigan Agricultural	7–0			
1914	Michigan Agricultural	5–2			
1915	Michigan Agricultural	5–1			
Michigan Agricultural:		29–5			
Total:		29–5			
