= Benjamin Van Alstyne =

American basketball coach (1893–1972)

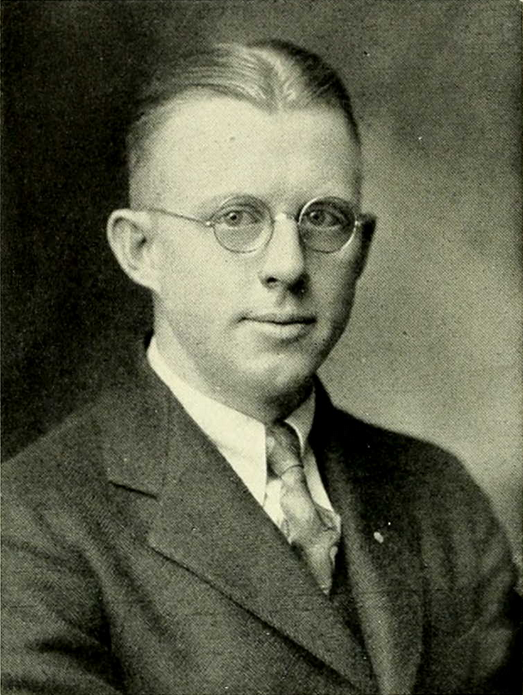
- Van Alstyne from The 1930 Wolverine

Biographical details
- Born: 1893
- Died: August 1972 (aged 78–79)

Coaching career (HC unless noted)

Basketball
- 1920–1926: Ohio Wesleyan
- 1926–1949: Michigan State

Baseball
- 1922–1925: Ohio Wesleyan

Head coaching record
- Overall: 304–194 (basketball); 22–24 (baseball)

Benjamin F. Van Alstyne (1893 – August 1972) was an American basketball coach.

The Canajoharie, New York native played college basketball, baseball and football at Colgate University, graduating in 1917. Following military service and a year of high school coaching in North Carolina, he became head coach of basketball and baseball, as well as assistant athletic director, at Ohio Wesleyan. He accepted the position of head basketball coach at Michigan State University in 1926, which he continued until 1949. During his tenure the average final score increased from 28 to 46 as the game evolved toward its modern style. He was also a football assistant until 1932, at which time he was appointed head golf coach. He resigned from coaching basketball after developing vision problems, and tiring of the associated pressures. He continued coaching golf until retiring in 1959.
