= John Benington =

American basketball player and coach

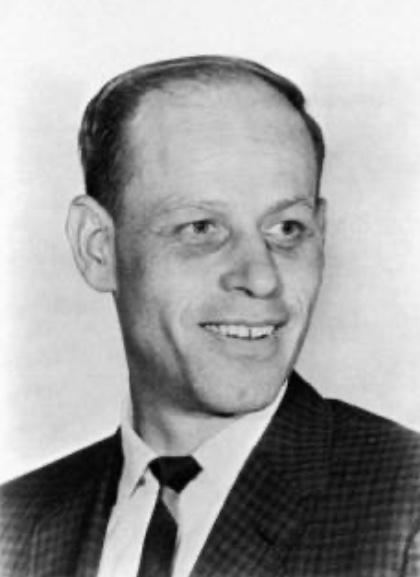
- Benington in 1964

Biographical details
- Born: December 31, 1921; Findlay, Ohio, U.S.
- Died: September 10, 1969 (aged 47); East Lansing, Michigan, U.S.

Playing career
- 1947–1949: San Francisco

Coaching career (HC unless noted)
- 1950–1956: Michigan State (assistant)
- 1956–1958: Drake
- 1958–1965: Saint Louis
- 1965–1969: Michigan State

Administrative career (AD unless noted)
- 1964–1965: Saint Louis

Head coaching record
- Overall: 299–203
- Tournaments: 3–4 (NIT)

Accomplishments and honors

Championships
- Big Ten regular season (1967)

John E. Benington (December 31, 1921 – September 10, 1969) was an American basketball coach who was the head coach of the Michigan State Spartans at the time of his death. He had previously been the head coach for the Drake Bulldogs and Saint Louis Billikens.

== College playing career ==
A native of Findlay, Ohio, Benington attended the University of San Francisco on a football scholarship after he finished his service in the United States Armed Forces during World War II. He was knocked out during his first game and decided to instead play on the basketball team. He played two seasons with the Dons, where he captained the squad that won the 1949 National Invitation Tournament.

== Coaching career ==
Benington was the assistant basketball coach at Michigan State University (1950–1956) under Pete Newell and Forddy Anderson.

Benington served a combined 14 seasons as head men's basketball coach at Drake University (1956–1958), St. Louis University (1958–1965) and Michigan State (1965–1969). He led Saint Louis to four NIT appearances including the finals of the 1961 NIT where they lost to Providence.

== Personal life ==
Benington was married and had nine children.

== Death ==
On April 11, 1969, Benington suffered a heart attack and was hospitalized for six weeks. He was determined to return to coaching full-time. On September 10, Benington was found dead on the floor of the coaches' lockerroom in Jenison Fieldhouse by his wife and freshman basketball coach. His cause of death was diagnosed as a massive heart attack.

== Head coaching record ==
Record table
Season	Team	Overall	Conference	Standing	Postseason
Drake Bulldogs (Missouri Valley Conference) (1956–1958)
1956–57	Drake	8–16	4–10	8th	
1957–58	Drake	13–12	4–10	8th	
Drake:		21–28 (.429)	8–20 (.286)		
Saint Louis Billikens (Missouri Valley Conference) (1958–1965)
1958–59	Saint Louis	20–6	10–4	3rd	NIT First Round
1959–60	Saint Louis	19–8	9–5	3rd	NIT First Round
1960–61	Saint Louis	21–9	7–5	T–3rd	NIT Runner-up
1961–62	Saint Louis	11–15	5–7	5th	
1962–63	Saint Louis	16–12	6–6	T–3rd	
1963–64	Saint Louis	13–12	6–6	T–4th	
1964–65	Saint Louis	18–9	9–5	T–2nd	NIT First Round
Saint Louis:		118–71 (.624)	52–38 (.578)		
Michigan State Spartans (Big Ten Conference) (1965–1969)
1965–66	Michigan State	15–7	10–4	2nd	
1966–67	Michigan State	16–7	10–4	T–1st	
1967–68	Michigan State	12–12	6–8	T–6th	
1968–69	Michigan State	11–12	6–8	T–5th	
Michigan State:		54–38 (.631)	32–24 (.571)		
Total:		299–203 (.596)			
National champion Postseason invitational champion Conference regular season champion Conference regular season and conference tournament champion Division regular season champion Division regular season and conference tournament champion Conference tournament champion
