= 1966–67 NCAA University Division men's basketball season =

Men's collegiate basketball season

- Preseason AP No. 1: UCLA Bruins
- NCAA Tournament: 1967
- Tournament dates: March 11 – 25, 1967
- National Championship: Freedom Hall; Louisville, Kentucky
- NCAA Champions: UCLA Bruins
- Helms National Champions: UCLA Bruins
- Other champions: Southern Illinois Salukis (NIT)
- Player of the Year (Helms): Lew Alcindor, UCLA Bruins

The 1966–67 NCAA University Division men's basketball season began in December 1966, progressed through the regular season and conference tournaments, and concluded with the 1967 NCAA University Division basketball tournament championship game on March 25, 1967, at Freedom Hall in Louisville, Kentucky.

The UCLA Bruins won their third NCAA national championship with a 79–64 victory over the Dayton Flyers.

== Season headlines ==
- The NCAA tournament expanded from 22 to 23 teams.
- UCLA went undefeated (30–0) and won its first of an eventual seven NCAA championships in a row, third overall, and third in four seasons. In the Athletic Association of Western Universities, it also won its first of what ultimately would be 13 consecutive conference titles.

== Season outlook ==
=== Pre-season polls ===
The Top 10 from the AP Poll and Top 20 from the Coaches Poll during the pre-season.

Associated Press
Ranking	Team
1	UCLA
2	UTEP
3	Kentucky
4	Duke
5	Louisville
6	New Mexico
7	Houston
8	Western Kentucky
9	North Carolina
10	Cincinnati

UPI Coaches
Ranking	Team
1	UCLA
2	UTEP
3	Kentucky
4	Duke
5	Michigan State
6	Houston
7	Louisville
8	BYU
9	Western Kentucky
10	Providence
11	Nebraska
12	Boston College
13 (tie)	Dayton
13 (tie)	Kansas
15	North Carolina
16 (tie)	Loyola-Chicago
16 (tie)	New Mexico
18	Cincinnati
19	Colorado State
20	St. John's

== Conference membership changes ==
School	Former conference	New conference
American Eagles	non-NCAA University Division	Middle Atlantic Conference
Jacksonville Dolphins	non-NCAA University Division	NCAA University Division independent
Rider Broncs	non-NCAA University Division	Middle Atlantic Conference
Tulane Green Wave	Southeastern Conference	NCAA University Division independent

== Regular season ==
=== Conferences ===
==== Conference winners and tournaments ====
Conference	Regular season winner	Conference player of the year	Conference tournament	Tournament venue (City)	Tournament winner
Athletic Association of Western Universities	UCLA	None selected	No Tournament		
Atlantic Coast Conference	North Carolina	Larry Miller, North Carolina	1967 ACC men's basketball tournament	Greensboro Coliseum (Greensboro, North Carolina)	North Carolina
Big Eight Conference	Kansas	None selected	No Tournament		
Big Sky Conference	Gonzaga & Montana State	None selected	No Tournament		
Big Ten Conference	Indiana & Michigan State	None selected	No Tournament		
Ivy League	Princeton	None selected	No Tournament		
Metropolitan Collegiate Conference	Manhattan, St. Peter's, & St. Francis (NY)		No Tournament		
Mid-American Conference	Toledo	None selected	No Tournament		
Middle Atlantic Conference	Temple		No Tournament		
Missouri Valley Conference	Louisville	None selected	No Tournament		
Ohio Valley Conference	Western Kentucky	Clem Haskins, Western Kentucky	1967 Ohio Valley Conference men's basketball tournament	Jefferson County Armory (Louisville, Kentucky)	Tennessee Tech
Southeastern Conference	Tennessee	Ron Widby, Tennessee	No Tournament		
Southern Conference	West Virginia	Johnny Moates, Richmond	1967 Southern Conference men's basketball tournament	Charlotte Coliseum (Charlotte, North Carolina)	West Virginia
Southwest Conference	SMU	Denny Holman, SMU	No Tournament		
West Coast Athletic Conference	Pacific	Keith Swagerty, Pacific	No Tournament		
Western Athletic Conference	BYU & Wyoming	None selected	No Tournament		
Yankee Conference	Connecticut	None selected	No Tournament		

==== Conference standings ====
1966–67 AAWU Conference men's basketball standings
	Conf.				Overall
Team	W		L	PCT	W		L	PCT
No. 1 UCLA	14	–	0	1.000	30	–	0	1.000
Washington State	8	–	6	.571	15	–	11	.577
Oregon State	8	–	6	.571	14	–	14	.500
Stanford	7	–	7	.500	15	–	11	.577
California	6	–	8	.429	17	–	10	.630
Washington	6	–	8	.429	13	–	12	.520
USC	6	–	8	.429	13	–	12	.520
Oregon	1	–	13	.071	9	–	17	.346
Rankings from AP Poll

1966–67 ACC men's basketball standings
	Conf.				Overall
Team	W		L	PCT	W		L	PCT
No. 4 North Carolina †	12	–	2	.857	26	–	6	.813
Duke	9	–	3	.750	18	–	9	.667
South Carolina	8	–	4	.667	16	–	7	.696
Clemson	9	–	5	.643	17	–	8	.680
Wake Forest	5	–	9	.357	9	–	18	.333
Maryland	5	–	9	.357	11	–	14	.440
Virginia	4	–	10	.286	9	–	17	.346
NC State	2	–	12	.143	7	–	19	.269
† 1967 ACC tournament winner Rankings from AP Poll

1966–67 Big Eight Conference men's basketball standings
	Conf.				Overall
Team	W		L	PCT	W		L	PCT
No. 3 Kansas	13	–	1	.929	23	–	4	.852
Colorado	10	–	4	.714	17	–	8	.680
Nebraska	10	–	4	.714	16	–	9	.640
Kansas State	9	–	5	.643	17	–	8	.680
Iowa State	6	–	8	.429	13	–	12	.520
Oklahoma	5	–	9	.357	8	–	17	.320
Oklahoma State	2	–	12	.143	7	–	18	.280
Missouri	1	–	13	.071	3	–	22	.120
Rankings from AP Poll

1966–67 Big Sky men's basketball standings
	Conf.				Overall
Team	W		L	PCT	W		L	PCT
Gonzaga	7	–	3	.700	21	–	6	.778
Montana State	7	–	3	.700	15	–	11	.577
Weber State	5	–	5	.500	18	–	7	.720
Idaho	5	–	5	.500	15	–	12	.556
Idaho State	5	–	5	.500	11	–	16	.407
Montana	1	–	9	.100	7	–	17	.292

1966–67 Big Ten Conference men's basketball standings
	Conf.				Overall
Team	W		L	PCT	W		L	PCT
Michigan State	10	–	4	.714	16	–	7	.696
Indiana	10	–	4	.714	18	–	8	.692
Iowa	9	–	5	.643	16	–	8	.667
Wisconsin	8	–	6	.571	15	–	9	.625
Purdue	7	–	7	.500	15	–	9	.625
Northwestern	7	–	7	.500	11	–	11	.500
Ohio State	6	–	8	.429	13	–	11	.542
Illinois	6	–	8	.429	12	–	12	.500
Minnesota	5	–	9	.357	9	–	15	.375
Michigan	2	–	12	.143	8	–	16	.333
Rankings from AP Poll

1966–67 Ivy League men's basketball standings
	Conf.				Overall
Team	W		L	PCT	W		L	PCT
No. 5 Princeton	13	–	1	.929	25	–	3	.893
Cornell	11	–	3	.786	19	–	5	.792
Yale	11	–	3	.786	14	–	7	.667
Pennsylvania	7	–	7	.500	11	–	14	.440
Columbia	6	–	8	.429	11	–	14	.440
Harvard	4	–	10	.286	10	–	14	.417
Brown	3	–	11	.214	10	–	16	.385
Dartmouth	1	–	13	.071	7	–	17	.292
Rankings from AP Poll

1966–67 Metropolitan Collegiate Conference men's basketball standings
	Conf.				Overall
Team	W		L	PCT	W		L	PCT
St. Francis (NY)	7	–	2	.778	15	–	8	.652
Saint Peter's	7	–	2	.778	18	–	6	.750
Manhattan	7	–	2	.778	13	–	8	.619
NYU	6	–	3	.667	10	–	16	.385
LIU	5	–	4	.556	22	–	7	.759
Wagner	4	–	5	.444	19	–	9	.679
Iona	4	–	5	.444	11	–	10	.524
Seton Hall	3	–	6	.333	7	–	17	.292
Hofstra	2	–	7	.222	12	–	13	.480
Fairleigh Dickinson	0	–	9	.000	4	–	19	.174
Rankings from AP Poll

1966–67 Mid-American Conference men's basketball standings
	Conf.				Overall
Team	W		L	PCT	W		L	PCT
Toledo	11	–	1	.917	23	–	2	.920
Marshall	10	–	2	.833	20	–	8	.714
Miami (Ohio)	7	–	5	.583	14	–	10	.583
Bowling Green State	5	–	7	.417	11	–	13	.458
Western Michigan	4	–	8	.333	10	–	14	.417
Ohio	4	–	8	.333	8	–	15	.348
Kent State	1	–	11	.083	5	–	18	.217
Rankings from AP Poll

1966–67 MAC men's basketball standings
	Conf.				Overall
Team	W		L	PCT	W		L	PCT
Temple†	7	–	0	1.000	20	–	8	.714
Saint Joseph's	2	–	1	.667	16	–	10	.615
Bucknell	6	–	3	.667	11	–	11	.500
Gettysburg	6	–	5	.545	12	–	10	.545
American	3	–	3	.500	16	–	8	.667
Delaware	4	–	5	.444	15	–	9	.625
Lehigh	4	–	5	.444	11	–	12	.478
La Salle	2	–	3	.400	14	–	12	.538
Lafayette	1	–	10	.091	4	–	21	.160
Rider*		–		–	11	–	12	.478
West Chester (Pa.)*		–		–	8	–	15	.348
† Regular-season championship winner * – Played as non-major program Rankings from AP Poll

1966–67 Missouri Valley Conference men's basketball standings
	Conf.				Overall
Team	W		L	PCT	W		L	PCT
No. 2 Louisville	12	–	2	.857	23	–	5	.821
Tulsa	10	–	4	.714	19	–	8	.704
Wichita State	9	–	5	.643	14	–	12	.538
Bradley	6	–	8	.429	17	–	9	.654
Cincinnati	6	–	8	.429	17	–	9	.654
Saint Louis	5	–	9	.357	13	–	13	.500
North Texas State	4	–	10	.286	12	–	13	.480
Drake	4	–	10	.286	9	–	16	.360
Rankings from AP Poll

1966–67 Ohio Valley Conference men's basketball standings
	Conf.				Overall
Team	W		L	PCT	W		L	PCT
No. 6 Western Kentucky	13	–	1	.929	23	–	3	.885
Morehead State	8	–	6	.571	16	–	8	.667
East Tennessee State	8	–	6	.571	17	–	9	.654
Murray State	8	–	6	.571	14	–	9	.609
Austin Peay State	7	–	7	.500	14	–	9	.609
Tennessee Tech†	6	–	8	.429	12	–	11	.522
Middle Tennessee	4	–	10	.286	10	–	15	.400
Eastern Kentucky	2	–	12	.143	5	–	18	.217
† Ohio Valley Conference tournament winner Rankings from AP Poll

1966–67 Southeastern Conference men's basketball standings
	Conf.				Overall
Team	W		L	PCT	W		L	PCT
No. 8 Tennessee	15	–	3	.833	21	–	7	.750
Florida	14	–	4	.778	21	–	4	.840
Vanderbilt	14	–	4	.778	21	–	5	.808
Auburn	12	–	6	.667	17	–	8	.680
Mississippi State	8	–	10	.444	14	–	11	.560
Kentucky	8	–	10	.444	13	–	13	.500
Ole Miss	7	–	11	.389	13	–	12	.520
Alabama	6	–	12	.333	13	–	13	.500
Georgia	5	–	13	.278	9	–	17	.346
LSU	1	–	17	.056	3	–	23	.115
Rankings from AP Poll

1966–67 Southern Conference men's basketball standings
	Conf.				Overall
Team	W		L	PCT	W		L	PCT
West Virginia †	9	–	1	.900	19	–	9	.679
Davidson	8	–	4	.667	15	–	12	.556
William & Mary	8	–	5	.615	14	–	11	.560
Richmond	9	–	7	.563	11	–	12	.478
The Citadel	6	–	7	.462	8	–	16	.333
George Washington	5	–	7	.417	6	–	18	.250
Furman	4	–	6	.400	9	–	15	.375
East Carolina	4	–	8	.333	7	–	17	.292
VMI	4	–	12	.250	5	–	16	.238
† Southern Conference Tournament winner Rankings from AP Poll

1966–67 Southwest Conference men's basketball standings
	Conf.				Overall
Team	W		L	PCT	W		L	PCT
SMU	12	–	2	.857	20	–	6	.769
Baylor	8	–	6	.571	14	–	10	.583
Texas	8	–	6	.571	14	–	10	.583
TCU	8	–	6	.571	10	–	14	.417
Texas Tech	7	–	7	.500	9	–	15	.375
Texas A&M	5	–	9	.357	6	–	18	.250
Rice	4	–	10	.286	7	–	17	.292
Arkansas	4	–	10	.286	6	–	17	.261
Rankings from AP Poll

1966–67 West Coast Athletic Conference men's basketball standings
	Conf.				Overall
Team	W		L	PCT	W		L	PCT
Pacific	14	–	0	1.000	24	–	4	.857
Loyola (Calif.)	10	–	4	.714	16	–	10	.615
Santa Clara	8	–	6	.571	13	–	13	.500
San Francisco	7	–	7	.500	13	–	12	.520
UC Santa Barbara	6	–	8	.429	10	–	16	.385
Pepperdine	5	–	9	.357	9	–	17	.346
San Jose State		–		–	9	–	15	.375
Saint Mary's	2	–	12	.143	4	–	21	.160
Rankings from AP Poll

1966–67 WAC men's basketball standings
	Conf.				Overall
Team	W		L	PCT	W		L	PCT
BYU	8	–	2	.800	14	–	10	.583
Wyoming	8	–	2	.800	15	–	14	.517
New Mexico	5	–	5	.500	19	–	8	.704
Utah	5	–	5	.500	15	–	11	.577
Arizona	3	–	7	.300	8	–	17	.320
Arizona State	1	–	9	.100	5	–	21	.192
Rankings from AP Poll

1966–67 Yankee Conference men's basketball standings
	Conf.				Overall
Team	W		L	PCT	W		L	PCT
Connecticut	9	–	1	.900	17	–	7	.708
Rhode Island	8	–	2	.800	14	–	12	.538
Massachusetts	7	–	3	.700	11	–	14	.440
New Hampshire	4	–	6	.400	10	–	12	.455
Maine	1	–	9	.100	8	–	12	.400
Vermont	1	–	9	.100	9	–	15	.375

=== University Division independents ===
A total of 51 college teams played as University Division independents. Among them, Boston College (21–3) had the best winning percentage (.875) and Houston (27–4) finished with the most wins.

1966–67 NCAA University Division men's basketball independents standings
	Conf.				Overall
Team	W		L	PCT	W		L	PCT
No. 9 Boston College		–		–	21	–	3	.875
No. 7 Houston		–		–	27	–	4	.871
St. John's		–		–	23	–	5	.821
Dayton		–		–	25	–	6	.806
No. 10 Texas Western		–		–	22	–	6	.786
St. Francis (PA)		–		–	20	–	6	.769
Syracuse		–		–	20	–	6	.769
Utah State		–		–	20	–	6	.769
Rutgers		–		–	22	–	7	.759
Providence		–		–	21	–	7	.750
VPI		–		–	20	–	7	.741
Marquette		–		–	21	–	9	.700
Seattle		–		–	18	–	8	.692
DePaul		–		–	17	–	8	.680
Georgia Tech		–		–	17	–	9	.654
Hardin–Simmons		–		–	17	–	9	.654
Memphis State		–		–	17	–	9	.654
Villanova		–		–	17	–	9	.654
Holy Cross		–		–	16	–	9	.640
Army		–		–	13	–	8	.619
Oklahoma City		–		–	16	–	10	.615
Loyola Chicago		–		–	13	–	9	.591
St. Bonaventure		–		–	13	–	9	.591
Canisius		–		–	14	–	10	.583
Tulane		–		–	14	–	10	.583
Miami (FL)		–		–	15	–	11	.577
New Mexico State		–		–	15	–	11	.577
Fairfield		–		–	12	–	9	.571
Colorado State		–		–	13	–	10	.565
Fordham		–		–	14	–	11	.560
Georgetown		–		–	12	–	11	.522
Notre Dame		–		–	14	–	14	.500
Xavier		–		–	13	–	13	.500
Loyola (LA)		–		–	11	–	11	.500
Creighton		–		–	12	–	13	.480
Niagara		–		–	12	–	13	.480
Navy		–		–	8	–	10	.444
Colgate		–		–	10	–	13	.435
Florida State		–		–	11	–	15	.423
Penn State		–		–	10	–	14	.417
Detroit		–		–	10	–	15	.400
Portland		–		–	10	–	16	.385
Butler		–		–	9	–	17	.346
Centenary		–		–	9	–	17	.346
Jacksonville		–		–	8	–	17	.320
Duquesne		–		–	7	–	15	.318
Air Force		–		–	6	–	18	.250
Pittsburgh		–		–	6	–	19	.240
Boston University		–		–	4	–	18	.182
West Texas State		–		–	1	–	18	.053
Rankings from AP Poll

=== Informal championships ===
Conference	Regular season winner	Most Valuable Player
Philadelphia Big 5	Villanova	Cliff Anderson, Saint Joseph's

Villanova finished with a 4–0 record in head-to-head competition among the Philadelphia Big 5.

== Post-season tournaments ==
=== NCAA tournament ===
==== Final Four ====
National semifinals
E	North Carolina	62
ME	Dayton	76
MW	Houston	58
W	UCLA	73

National finals
ME	Dayton	64
W	UCLA	79
Third place
E	North Carolina	62
MW	Houston	84

=== National Invitation tournament ===
==== Semifinals & finals ====
Semifinals
Southern Illinois	79
Rutgers	70
Marshall	78
Marquette	83

Finals
Southern Illinois	71
Marquette	56
Third place
Rutgers	93
Marshall	76

== Awards ==
=== Consensus All-American teams ===
Consensus First Team
Player	Position	Class	Team
Lew Alcindor	C	Sophomore	UCLA
Clem Haskins	G	Senior	Western Kentucky
Elvin Hayes	F/C	Junior	Houston
Bob Lloyd	G	Senior	Rutgers
Wes Unseld	C	Senior	Louisville
Bob Verga	G	Senior	Duke
Jimmy Walker	G	Senior	Providence

Consensus Second Team
Player	Position	Class	Team
Louie Dampier	G	Senior	Kentucky
Mel Daniels	C	Senior	New Mexico
Sonny Dove	F	Senior	St. John's
Don May	G/F	Junior	Dayton
Larry Miller	F	Junior	North Carolina

=== Major player of the year awards ===
- Helms Player of the Year: Lew Alcindor, UCLA
- Associated Press Player of the Year: Lew Alcindor, UCLA
- UPI Player of the Year: Lew Alcindor, UCLA
- Oscar Robertson Trophy (USBWA): Lew Alcindor, UCLA
- Sporting News Player of the Year: Lew Alcindor, UCLA

=== Major coach of the year awards ===
- Associated Press Coach of the Year: John Wooden, UCLA
- Henry Iba Award (USBWA): John Wooden, UCLA
- NABC Coach of the Year: John Wooden, UCLA
- UPI Coach of the Year: John Wooden, UCLA
- Sporting News Coach of the Year: Jack Hartman, Southern Illinois

=== Other major awards ===
- Robert V. Geasey Trophy (Top player in Philadelphia Big 5): Cliff Anderson, St. Joseph's
- NIT/Haggerty Award (Top player in New York City metro area): Sonny Dove, St. John's

== Coaching changes ==
A number of teams changed coaches during the season and after it ended.

Team	Former Coach	Interim Coach	New Coach	Reason
Bowling Green	Warren Scholler		Bill Fitch	
Dartmouth	Doggie Julian		Dave Gavitt	
Lehigh	Pete Carril		Roy Heckman	
Missouri	Bob Vanatta		Norm Stewart	
Princeton	Butch van Breda Kolff		Pete Carril	
West Texas A&M	Jimmy Viramontes		Dennis Walling	
