= List of Dayton Flyers men's basketball seasons =

American collegiate basketball team seasons

This is a list of seasons completed by the Dayton Flyers men's college basketball team.

== Seasons ==
Record table
Season	Team	Overall	Conference	Standing	Postseason
No Coach (Independent) (1903–1909)
1903–04	No Coach	5–1			
1904–05	No Coach	6–1			
1905–06	No Coach	7–2			
1906–07	No Coach	14–0			
1907–08	No Coach	10–3			
1908–09	No Coach	12–2			
William O'Malley (Independent) (1909–1911)
1909–10	William O'Malley	5–6			
1910–11	William O'Malley	10–1			
William O'Malley:		15–7 (.682)			
Harry Solimano (Independent) (1911–1914)
1911–12	Harry Solimano	13–0			
1912–13	Harry Solimano	11–1			
1913–14	Harry Solimano	5–4			
Harry Solimano:		29–5 (.853)			
Al Mahrt (Independent) (1914–1915)
1914–15	Al Mahrt	4–4			
Al Mahrt:		4–4 (.500)			
Alfred McCray (Independent) (1915–1917)
1915–16	Alfred McCray	11–2			
1916–17	Alfred McCray	8–3			
Alfred McCray:		19–5 (.792)			
Al Mahrt (Independent) (1917–1919)
1917–18	Al Mahrt	2–4			
1918–19	Al Mahrt	3–4			
Al Mahrt:		9–12 (.429)			
Harry Solimano (Independent) (1919–1920)
1919–20	Harry Solimano	5–8			
Harry Solimano:		34–13 (.723)			
Dutch Thiele (Independent) (1920–1921)
1920–21	Dutch Thiele	6–16			
Dutch Thiele:		6–16 (.273)			
William Sherry (Independent) (1921–1922)
1921–22	William Sherry	6–8			
William Sherry:		6–8 (.429)			
Van Hill (Independent) (1922–1923)
1922–23	Van Hill	9–7			
Van Hill:		9–7 (.563)			
Harry Baujan (Independent) (1923–1927)
1923–24	Harry Baujan	9–5			
1924–25	Harry Baujan	9–11			
1925–26	Harry Baujan	7–8			
1926–27	Harry Baujan	10–9			
1927–28	Harry Baujan	11–5			
Harry Baujan:		46–38 (.548)			
George Fitzgerald (Independent) (1928–1929)
1928–29	George Fitzgerald	9–10			
George Fitzgerald:		9–10 (.474)			
Bill Belanich (Independent) (1929–1933)
1929–30	Bill Belanich	4–14			
1930–31	Bill Belanich	2–15			
1931–32	Bill Belanich	3–12			
1932–33	Bill Belanich	7–7			
Bill Belanich:		16–48 (.250)			
Louis Tschudi (Independent) (1933–1935)
1933–34	Louis Tschudi	9–7			
1934–35	Louis Tschudi	4–11			
Louis Tschudi:		13–18 (.419)			
Joe Holsinger (Independent) (1935–1939)
1935–36	Joe Holsinger	3–13			
1936–37	Joe Holsinger	7–12			
1937–38	Joe Holsinger	6–11			
Joe Holsinger:		18–48 (.273)			
James Carter (Independent) (1939–1947)
1939–40	James Carter	4–17			
1940–41	James Carter	9–14			
1941–42	James Carter	12–6			
1942–43	James Carter	9–8			
1943–44	James Carter	No basketball due to World War II			
1944–45	James Carter	No basketball due to World War II			
1945–46	James Carter	3–13			
1946–47	James Carter	4–17			
James Carter:		41–75 (.353)			
Tom Blackburn (Independent) (1948–1964)
1947–48	Tom Blackburn	12–14			
1948–49	Tom Blackburn	16–14			National Catholic Invitational Second Round
1949–50	Tom Blackburn	24–8			Ohio Catholic Tournament Runner-up
1950–51	Tom Blackburn	27–5			NIT Runner-up
1951–52	Tom Blackburn	28–5			NIT Runner-up; NCAA Sweet Sixteen
1952–53	Tom Blackburn	16–13			
1953–54	Tom Blackburn	25–7			NIT Quarterfinal
1954–55	Tom Blackburn	25–4			NIT Runner-up
1955–56	Tom Blackburn	25–4			NIT Runner-up
1956–57	Tom Blackburn	19–9			NIT Quarterfinal
1957–58	Tom Blackburn	25–4			NIT Runner-up
1958–59	Tom Blackburn	14–12			
1959–60	Tom Blackburn	21–7			NIT Quarterfinal
1960–61	Tom Blackburn	20–9			NIT Fourth Place
1961–62	Tom Blackburn	24–6			NIT Champion
1962–63	Tom Blackburn	16–10			
1963–64	Tom Blackburn	15–10			
Tom Blackburn:		352–141 (.714)			
Don Donoher (Independent) (1964–1988)
1964–65	Don Donoher	22–7			NCAA University Division Sweet Sixteen
1965–66	Don Donoher	23–6			NCAA University Division Sweet Sixteen
1966–67	Don Donoher	25–6			NCAA University Division Runner-up
1967–68	Don Donoher	21–9			NIT Champion
1968–69	Don Donoher	20–7			NCAA University Division First Round
1969–70	Don Donoher	19–8			NCAA University Division First Round
1970–71	Don Donoher	18–9			NIT First Round
1971–72	Don Donoher	13–13			
1972–73	Don Donoher	13–13			
1973–74	Don Donoher	20–9			NCAA Division I Sweet Sixteen
1974–75	Don Donoher	10–16			
1975–76	Don Donoher	14–13			
1976–77	Don Donoher	16–11			
1977–78	Don Donoher	19–10			NIT Quarterfinal
1978–79	Don Donoher	19–10			NIT Second Round
1979–80	Don Donoher	13–14			
1980–81	Don Donoher	18–11			NIT Second Round
1981–82	Don Donoher	21–9			NIT Quarterfinal
1982–83	Don Donoher	18–10			
1983–84	Don Donoher	21–11			NCAA Division I Elite Eight
1984–85	Don Donoher	19–10			NCAA Division I First Round
1985–86	Don Donoher	17–13			NIT First Round
1986–87	Don Donoher	13–15			
1987–88	Don Donoher	13–18			
Don Donoher (Midwestern Collegiate Conference) (1988–1989)
1988–89	Don Donoher	12–17	6–6	4th	
Don Donoher:		437–275 (.650)	6–6 (.500)		
Jim O'Brien (Midwestern Collegiate Conference) (1989–1993)
1989–90	Jim O'Brien	22–10	10–4	2nd	NCAA Division I Second Round
1990–91	Jim O'Brien	14–15	8–6	T–3rd	
1991–92	Jim O'Brien	15–15	5–5	4th	
1992–93	Jim O'Brien	4–26	3–11	T–7th	
Jim O'Brien (Great Midwest Conference) (1993–1994)
1993–94	Jim O'Brien	6–21	1–11	7th	
Jim O'Brien:		61–87 (.412)	27–37 (.422)		
Oliver Purnell (Great Midwest Conference) (1994–1995)
1994–95	Oliver Purnell	7–20	0–12	7th	
Oliver Purnell (Atlantic 10 Conference) (1995–2003)
1995–96	Oliver Purnell	15–14	6–10	4th	
1996–97	Oliver Purnell	13–14	6–10	4th	
1997–98	Oliver Purnell	21–12	11–5	T–1st (West)	NIT Second Round
1998–99	Oliver Purnell	11–17	5–11	5th (West)	
1999–00	Oliver Purnell	22–9	11–5	1st (West)	NCAA Division I First Round
2000–01	Oliver Purnell	21–13	9–7	5th	NIT Quarterfinal
2001–02	Oliver Purnell	21–11	9–7	3rd (West)	NIT Quarterfinal
2002–03	Oliver Purnell	24–6	14–2	2nd (West)	NCAA Division I First Round
Oliver Purnell:		155–116 (.572)	61–69 (.469)		
Brian Gregory (Atlantic 10 Conference) (2003–2011)
2003–04	Brian Gregory	24–9	12–4	1st (West)	NCAA Division I First Round
2004–05	Brian Gregory	18–11	10–6	2nd (West)	
2005–06	Brian Gregory	14–17	6–10	T–11th	
2006–07	Brian Gregory	19–12	8–8	T–7th	
2007–08	Brian Gregory	23–11	8–8	T–7th	NIT Quarterfinal
2008–09	Brian Gregory	27–8	11–5	2nd	NCAA Division I Second Round
2009–10	Brian Gregory	25–12	8–8	7th	NIT Champion
2010–11	Brian Gregory	22–14	7–9	8th	NIT First Round
Brian Gregory:		172–94 (.647)	70–58 (.547)		
Archie Miller (Atlantic 10 Conference) (2011–2017)
2011–12	Archie Miller	20–13	9–7	T–5th	NIT First Round
2012–13	Archie Miller	17–13	7–9	T–11th	
2013–14	Archie Miller	26–11	10–6	T–5th	NCAA Division I Elite Eight
2014–15	Archie Miller	27–9	13–5	2nd	NCAA Division I Third Round
2015–16	Archie Miller	25–8	14–4	T–1st	NCAA Division I First Round
2016–17	Archie Miller	24–8	15–3	1st	NCAA Division I First Round
Archie Miller:		139–63 (.688)	68–34 (.667)		
Anthony Grant (Atlantic 10 Conference) (2017–present)
2017–18	Anthony Grant	14–17	8–10	9th	
2018–19	Anthony Grant	21–12	13–5	3rd	NIT First Round
2019–20	Anthony Grant	29–2	18–0	1st	No postseason held
2020–21	Anthony Grant	14–10	9–7	7th	NIT First Round
2021–22	Anthony Grant	24–11	14–4	2nd	NIT Second Round
2022–23	Anthony Grant	22–12	12–6	T–2nd	Declined NIT invitation
2023–24	Anthony Grant	25–8	14–4	3rd	NCAA Division I Second Round
2024–25	Anthony Grant	23–11	12–6	T–3rd	NIT Second Round
2025–26	Anthony Grant	25–12	12–6	4th	NIT Quarterfinals
Anthony Grant:		197–95 (.675)	108–48 (.692)		
Total:		1,785–1,172 (.604)			
National champion Postseason invitational champion Conference regular season champion Conference regular season and conference tournament champion Division regular season champion Division regular season and conference tournament champion Conference tournament champion
