= Vernon Vanoy =

American gridiron football player (born 1946)

No. 65, 79, 73, 87
- Position: Defensive tackle

Personal information
- Born: December 31, 1946 (age 79); Kansas City, Missouri, U.S.
- Listed height: 6 ft 8 in (2.03 m)
- Listed weight: 275 lb (125 kg)

Career information
- High school: Lincoln Prep (Kansas City)
- College: Kansas (1965-1968)
- NFL draft: 1969: 3rd round, 60th overall pick

Career history
- Toronto Argonauts (1969); New York Giants (1971); Green Bay Packers (1972); Oakland Raiders (1973)*; Houston Oilers (1973); Jacksonville Sharks (1974); Jacksonville Express (1975)*
- * Offseason or practice squad member only

Career NFL statistics
- Sacks: 4
- Stats at Pro Football Reference

Vernon Vanoy (born December 31, 1946) is an American former professional football player who was a defensive tackle in the National Football League (NFL) for the New York Giants, Green Bay Packers and Houston Oilers. He played college football for the Kansas Jayhawks.

== Early life ==
Vanoy attended Lincoln High School in Kansas City, Missouri, graduating in 1965. Vanoy starred as both a football and basketball player at Lincoln. He earned Kansas City Star All-Metro in both basketball (honorable mention) and football (1st team) and 2nd team Missouri All-State in football after his senior season.

On May 6, 1965, Vanoy signed a college basketball letter-of-intent with the University of Kansas.

== College basketball career ==
Vanoy played three seasons of college basketball for the University of Kansas.

In the 1965-1966 season, due to the NCAA freshman eligibility rules in place at the time, Vanoy competed for the Jayhawk freshman team.

In the 1966-1967 season, Vanoy earned Big 8 Conference basketball Sophomore of the Year honors while averaging 8.3 points and 6.5 rebounds per game for the Jayhawks. Kansas won that year's regular season Big 8 Conference Championship and advanced to the semifinals of the NCAA Midwest Regional before losing to Elvin Hayes and the Houston Cougars 66-53. After besting Kansas, Houston fell in the 1967 NCAA Final 4 to Lew Alcindor and the UCLA Bruins. After losing to Houston, the Jayhawks defeated Wes Unseld and the Louisville Cardinals 70-68 in the NCAA Midwest Regional third-place game.

After starting every game but one in the 1966-1967 season as a sophomore, but after finishing his first college football season (see "Transition to Football" below), Vanoy played a reserve role for the 1967-1968 Jayhawks. Vanoy’s stats for his junior season were 3.9 points and 3.3 rebounds per game. The 1967-68 Jayhawks finished second in the Big 8 Conference regular season behind Kansas State. In this era, the NCAA tournament only invited the conference champion, so the second-place finish earned the Jayhawks an invitation to the National Invitation Tournament. The Jayhawks won 3 games in the 1968 NIT before falling to Dayton in the championship game by the score of 61-48.

== Transition to Football ==
In April 1967, after playing two seasons of collegiate basketball for Kansas, Vanoy joined the Kansas Jayhawks football team to play defensive end. Vanoy’s decision to resume his football career coincided with the hiring of Pepper Rodgers (replacing Jack Mitchell) as the new Jayhawk football coach. In explaining the move to play both sports, Vanoy cited his ambitions to play professional sports (either football or basketball) after college.

== College football career ==
Vanoy played two seasons (1967 and 1968) for Kansas Jayhawks football as a defensive end.

In his junior (first) season, Vanoy tallied 19 solo tackles and 18 assists as a defensive end for the football Jayhawks that finished 3rd in the Big 8 Conference with a 5-5 record.

In his senior (second) season, Vanoy teamed up with fellow Jayhawk defensive end John Zook to form an effective pass-rushing combination for one of the greatest Jayhawk football teams in school history.

Vanoy earned 1968 All-Big 8 Conference honorable mention honors as a defensive end.

The 1968 Kansas Jayhawks football team tied Oklahoma for 1st place in the Big 8 Conference and advanced to play Penn State in the 1969 Orange Bowl. The Jayhawks lost to Penn State by the score of 15-14 on a second-chance last-minute two-point conversion in one of the most famous Orange Bowls every played. The Jayhawks finished the 1968 season ranked 6th by the coaches and 7th by the media in the 1968 college football rankings .

Kansas City Star sports columnist Joe McGuff said of Vanoy's performance against Penn State, "Kansas had an abundance of heroes. Vernon Vanoy played the finest game of his career at defensive end".

In addition to Vanoy, the Jayhawks roster included other future NFL players such as John Zook, John Riggins, Larry Brown, Jim Bailey, Steve Lawson, Bill Bell and Bobby Douglass.

== Professional football career ==
Vanoy was selected by New York Giants in the third round (60th overall pick) of the 1969 NFL/AFL draft.

However, instead of immediately joining the Giants, Vanoy signed with the Toronto Argonauts of the Canadian Football League. Vanoy played only the 1969 season with the Argonauts.

Vanoy joined the New York Giants for the 1970 training camp but failed to make the opening game roster and was released in the final roster cut.

In 1971, Vanoy rejoined the New York Giants and played 6 games. In 1972, Vanoy again participated in training camp with the Giants, but was released in August.

After being released by the Giants, Vanoy was signed by the Green Bay Packers where he played the 1972 season. A career highlight for Vanoy was on October 1, 1972 when Vanoy, substituting for injured starter Mike McCoy tallied 3 sacks against the defending Super Bowl Champion Dallas Cowboys in a 16-13 victory for the Packers.

After the 1972 season, the Packers traded Vanoy and a draft pick to the Oakland Raiders for Carleton Oats.

Vanoy never played for the Raiders, but went on to play one game for the Houston Oilers in the 1973 NFL season.
