= 1967 Southern Conference men's basketball tournament =

- Classification: Division I
- Season: 1966–67
- Teams: 8
- Site: Charlotte Coliseum; Charlotte, NC
- Champions: West Virginia (10th title)
- Winning coach: Bucky Waters (1st title)

1966–67 Southern Conference men's basketball standings
	Conf.				Overall
Team	W		L	PCT	W		L	PCT
West Virginia †	9	–	1	.900	19	–	9	.679
Davidson	8	–	4	.667	15	–	12	.556
William & Mary	8	–	5	.615	14	–	11	.560
Richmond	9	–	7	.563	11	–	12	.478
The Citadel	6	–	7	.462	8	–	16	.333
George Washington	5	–	7	.417	6	–	18	.250
Furman	4	–	6	.400	9	–	15	.375
East Carolina	4	–	8	.333	7	–	17	.292
VMI	4	–	12	.250	5	–	16	.238
† Southern Conference Tournament winner Rankings from AP Poll

The 1967 Southern Conference men's basketball tournament took place from March 2–4, 1967 at the original Charlotte Coliseum in Charlotte, North Carolina. The West Virginia Mountaineers, led by head coach Bucky Waters, won their tenth Southern Conference title and received the automatic berth to the 1967 NCAA tournament.

== Format ==
The top eight finishers of the conference's nine members were eligible for the tournament. Teams were seeded based on conference winning percentage. The tournament used a preset bracket consisting of three rounds.

== Bracket ==
Quarterfinals; March 2
1	West Virginia	82
8	East Carolina	53
4	Richmond	100*
5	The Citadel	98
2	Davidson	64
7	Furman	55
3	William & Mary	76
6	George Washington	66

Semifinals; March 3
1	West Virginia	82
4	Richmond	70
2	Davidson	78
3	William & Mary	65

Finals; March 4
1	West Virginia	81
2	Davidson	65

* Overtime game

== See also ==
- List of Southern Conference men's basketball champions
