= 1966–67 Washington State Cougars men's basketball team =

American college basketball season

1966–67 Washington State Cougars men's basketball
- Conference: Athletic Association of Western Universities
- Record: 15–11 (8–6 AAWU, Pac-8)
- Head coach: Marv Harshman (9th season)
- Home arena: Bohler Gymnasium

1966–67 AAWU Conference men's basketball standings
	Conf.				Overall
Team	W		L	PCT	W		L	PCT
No. 1 UCLA	14	–	0	1.000	30	–	0	1.000
Washington State	8	–	6	.571	15	–	11	.577
Oregon State	8	–	6	.571	14	–	14	.500
Stanford	7	–	7	.500	15	–	11	.577
California	6	–	8	.429	17	–	10	.630
Washington	6	–	8	.429	13	–	12	.520
USC	6	–	8	.429	13	–	12	.520
Oregon	1	–	13	.071	9	–	17	.346
Rankings from AP Poll

The 1966–67 Washington State Cougars men's basketball team represented Washington State University for the 1966–67 NCAA college basketball season. Led by ninth-year head coach Marv Harshman, the Cougars were members of the Athletic Association of Western Universities (AAWU, Pac-8) and played their home games on campus at Bohler Gymnasium in Pullman, Washington.

The Cougars were 15–11 overall in the regular season and 8–6 in conference play, tied for second in the standings.

It was Washington State's first winning record in conference play in seventeen years.
