= 1967 NCAA University Division basketball championship game =

1967 NCAA Tournament Championship Game
National championship game
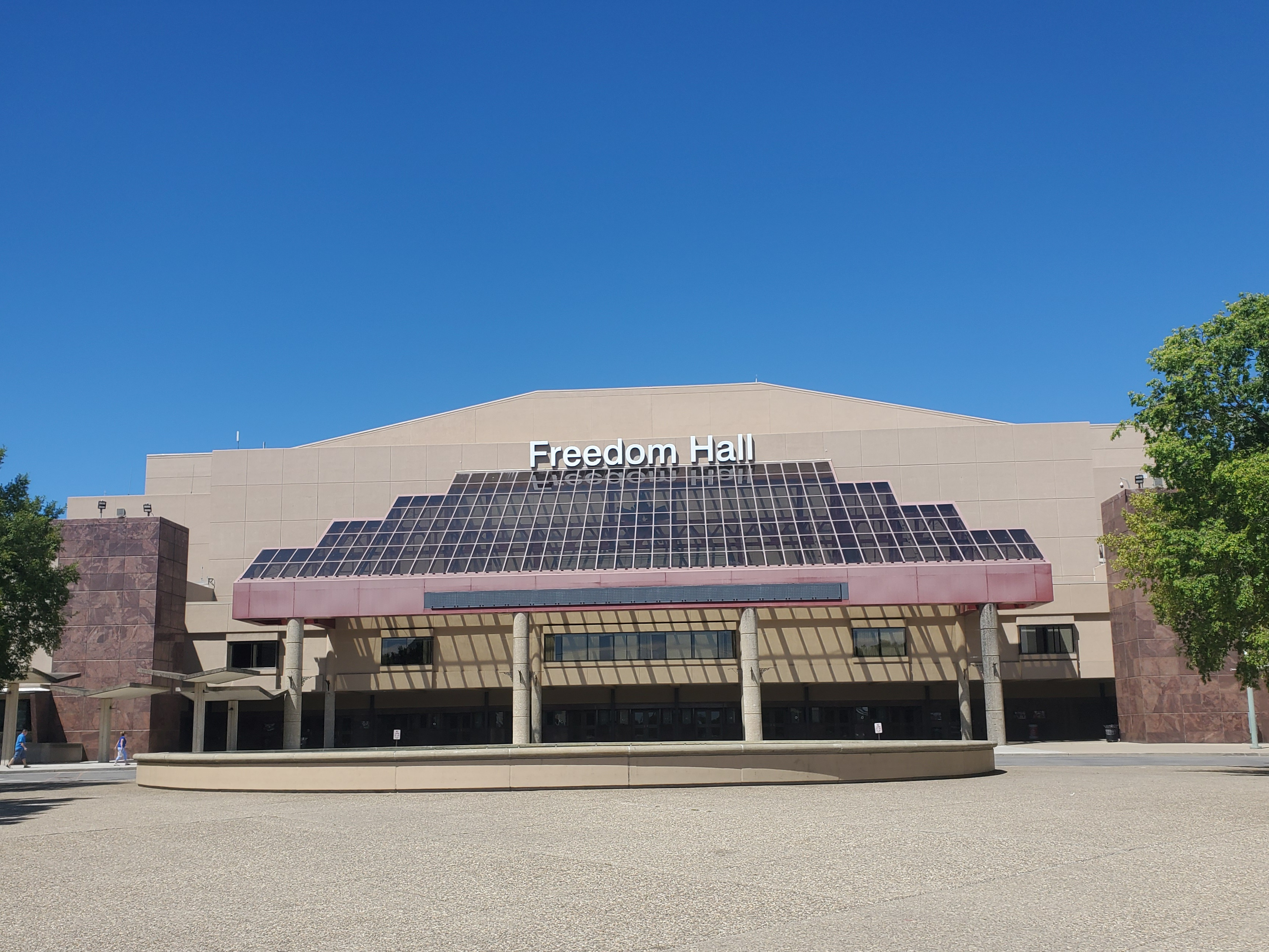
- Freedom Hall in Louisville, Kentucky, hosted the championship game.
UCLA Bruins	Dayton Flyers
AAWU	Independent
(29-0)	(23-4)
79	64
Head coach: John Wooden	Head coach: Don Donoher
- AP: 1
- Coaches: 1
- AP: NR
- Coaches: NR
	1st half	2nd half	Total
UCLA Bruins	38	41	79
Dayton Flyers	20	44	64
- Date: March 25, 1967
- Venue: Freedom Hall, Louisville, Kentucky
- MVP: Kareem Abdul-Jabbar, UCLA
- Attendance: 18,892

United States TV coverage
- Network: Sports Network Incorporated

The 1967 NCAA University Division Basketball Championship Game was the finals of the 1967 NCAA University Division basketball tournament and it determined the national champion for the 1966-67 NCAA University Division men's basketball season. The game was played on March 25, 1967, at Freedom Hall in Louisville, Kentucky. It featured the UCLA Bruins of the Athletic Association of Western Universities, and the independent Dayton Flyers.

UCLA defeated the Cinderella Flyers to win their third national championship in four years, and their first of seven consecutive national championships.

== Participating teams ==
=== UCLA Bruins ===
- West
  - UCLA 109, Wyoming 60
  - UCLA 80, Pacific 64
- Final Four
  - UCLA 73, Houston 58

=== Dayton Flyers ===
- Mideast
  - Dayton 69, Western Kentucky 67 (OT)
  - Dayton 53, Tennessee 52
  - Dayton 71, Virginia Tech 66 (OT)
- Final Four
  - Dayton 76, North Carolina 62

== Game summary ==
Sports Network Inc.

March 25, 1967

#1 UCLA Bruins 79, Dayton Flyers 64
Scoring by half: 38-20, 41-44
Pts: Kareem Abdul-Jabbar 20; Rebs: Kareem Abdul-Jabbar 18; Asts: Kareem Abdul-Jabbar 3	Pts: Don May 21; Rebs: Don May 17; Asts: Don May 3

Freedom Hall, Louisville, Kentucky
Attendance: 18,892
