= 1966–67 Georgetown Hoyas men's basketball team =

American college basketball season

1966–67 Georgetown Hoyas men's basketball

Kodak Classic Champions
- Conference: Independent
- Record: 12–11
- Head coach: John Magee (1st season)
- Assistant coach: Bob Reese (1st season)
- Captain: Jim Lyddy
- Home arena: McDonough Gymnasium

1966–67 NCAA University Division men's basketball independents standings
	Conf.				Overall
Team	W		L	PCT	W		L	PCT
No. 9 Boston College		–		–	21	–	3	.875
No. 7 Houston		–		–	27	–	4	.871
St. John's		–		–	23	–	5	.821
Dayton		–		–	25	–	6	.806
No. 10 Texas Western		–		–	22	–	6	.786
St. Francis (PA)		–		–	20	–	6	.769
Syracuse		–		–	20	–	6	.769
Utah State		–		–	20	–	6	.769
Rutgers		–		–	22	–	7	.759
Providence		–		–	21	–	7	.750
VPI		–		–	20	–	7	.741
Marquette		–		–	21	–	9	.700
Seattle		–		–	18	–	8	.692
DePaul		–		–	17	–	8	.680
Georgia Tech		–		–	17	–	9	.654
Hardin–Simmons		–		–	17	–	9	.654
Memphis State		–		–	17	–	9	.654
Villanova		–		–	17	–	9	.654
Holy Cross		–		–	16	–	9	.640
Army		–		–	13	–	8	.619
Oklahoma City		–		–	16	–	10	.615
Loyola Chicago		–		–	13	–	9	.591
St. Bonaventure		–		–	13	–	9	.591
Canisius		–		–	14	–	10	.583
Tulane		–		–	14	–	10	.583
Miami (FL)		–		–	15	–	11	.577
New Mexico State		–		–	15	–	11	.577
Fairfield		–		–	12	–	9	.571
Colorado State		–		–	13	–	10	.565
Fordham		–		–	14	–	11	.560
Georgetown		–		–	12	–	11	.522
Notre Dame		–		–	14	–	14	.500
Xavier		–		–	13	–	13	.500
Loyola (LA)		–		–	11	–	11	.500
Creighton		–		–	12	–	13	.480
Niagara		–		–	12	–	13	.480
Navy		–		–	8	–	10	.444
Colgate		–		–	10	–	13	.435
Florida State		–		–	11	–	15	.423
Penn State		–		–	10	–	14	.417
Detroit		–		–	10	–	15	.400
Portland		–		–	10	–	16	.385
Butler		–		–	9	–	17	.346
Centenary		–		–	9	–	17	.346
Jacksonville		–		–	8	–	17	.320
Duquesne		–		–	7	–	15	.318
Air Force		–		–	6	–	18	.250
Pittsburgh		–		–	6	–	19	.240
Boston University		–		–	4	–	18	.182
West Texas State		–		–	1	–	18	.053
Rankings from AP Poll

The 1966–67 Georgetown Hoyas men's basketball team represented Georgetown University during the 1966–67 NCAA University Division college basketball season. John Magee coached them in his first season as head coach. The team was an independent and played its home games at McDonough Gymnasium on the Georgetown campus in Washington, D.C.

After the departure of Georgetown head coach Tommy O'Keefe at the end of the previous season, no college head coach or assistant coach applied for the job. Boston College head coach Bob Cousy recommended Magee, the head coach of Catholic Memorial School in Boston, Massachusetts. Georgetown hired Magee, who would go on to coach the Hoyas for six seasons.

== Season recap ==
During the previous season, Georgetown had posted back-to-back 100-plus-point victories in February 1966. The Hoyas repeated that feat this season, winning the Kodak Classic in late December 1966 with wins of 104–82 over Purdue and 101–69 over Dartmouth. The Hoyas would not have back-to-back 100-plus-point games again until December 2018.

Junior guard Dennis Cesar, an expert in shooting free throws, shot 12-for-16 from the field at Canisius. In the two games of the Kodak Classic, he scored a combined 40 points against Purdue and Dartmouth. Shortly after that, he had a 28-point game against Saint Peter's. A shoulder injury reduced his performance later in the year but did not stop him from scoring in double figures in all but two games this season.

Senior forward Steve Sullivan played in all 23 games and scored in double figures in 21 of them, scoring 20 or more points ten times. In the season opener, he scored 33 points and pulled down 17 rebounds against American; later in the year he had 26 points and 23 rebounds against Syracuse, and in the last home game of the year, he had an 18-point, 16-rebound effort against Seton Hall. For the season, he averaged 12 rebounds per game, a school record at the time.

Senior center Frank Hollendoner frequently got into foul trouble, but he shot 69% from the field and averaged 11.1 points per game for the season. He scored 22 points against Purdue and scored 15 points and had 15 rebounds against Navy.

Sophomore forward Jim Supple joined the varsity team after a high-scoring season with the freshman team the previous year. He played in all 23 games and, although he often got in foul trouble, he scored in double figures in 15 of them. His season high was a 23-point performance against Boston College.

In the 1964–65 season, Georgetown had started strong, raising hopes for a post-season tournament berth, but lost seven of its final 10 games to drop out of consideration for the post-season. Two years later, the 1966–67 Hoyas followed a similar pattern, starting 9–3 but losing eight of their final 11 games to finish with a record of 12–11 and no post-season play. The team was not ranked in the Top 20 of the Associated Press Poll or Coaches' Poll at any time.

== Roster ==
From the 1958–59 season through the 1967–68 season, Georgetown players wore even-numbered jerseys for home games and odd-numbered ones for away games; for example, a player would wear No. 10 at home and No. 11 on the road. Players are listed below by the even numbers they wore at home.

Guard Bernard White joined the team this season as the first African-American recruit in Georgetown men's basketball history. He had played for George Mason University the previous season, but George Mason's men's basketball program did not receive National Collegiate Athletic Association (NCAA) recognition until 1967, so White retained the then-maximum three years of NCAA varsity eligibility when he joined the Hoyas.

#	Name	Height	Weight (lbs.)	Position	Class	Hometown	Previous Team(s)
10	Pete Mitchell	6"0"	N/A	G	Sr.	New Orleans, LA, U.S.	Jesuit HS
12	Bruce Stinebrickner	6'1"	180	G	Jr.	West Hempstead, NY, U.S.	St. Agnes Boys HS
14	Dennis Cesar	6'1"	180	G	Jr.	Clifton, NJ, U.S.	Clifton HS
20	Jim Lyddy	N/A	N/A	G	Sr.	Bridgeport, CT, U.S.	Fairfield College Preparatory School
24	Steve Sullivan	6'8"	200	F	Sr.	East Orange, NJ, U.S.	Essex Catholic HS
30	Bernard White	6'1"	N/A	G	So.	Ann Arbor, MI, U.S.	George Mason University
32	Frank Hollendoner	6'11"	245	C	Sr.	Chicago, IL, U.S.	St. Patrick HS
34	Lou Fusz	N/A	N/A	G	Sr.	St. Louis, MO, U.S.	St. Louis University HS
40	Rick Cannon	6'4"	N/A	F	Jr.	Elwood, IN, U.S.	Wendell Willkie HS
50	Bob Knuppel	6'5"	N/A	F	So.	Wayne, NJ, U.S.	DePaul Catholic HS
52	Jim Supple	6'4"	185	F	So.	Summit, NJ, U.S.	St. Peter's Preparatory School
54	Bob Holder	6'4"	N/A	C	So.	Ridgewood, NJ, U.S.	Don Bosco Preparatory HS

== Rankings ==
The team was not ranked in the Top 20 in the Associated Press Poll at any time.

== 1966–67 schedule and results ==
Date time, TV	Rank^{#}	Opponent^{#}	Result	Record	Site city, state
Regular Season
Thu., Dec. 1, 1966 no, no		at American	W 82–80	1-0	Fort Myer Gymnasium; Fort Myer, VA
Sat., Dec. 3, 1966 no, no		at St. John's	L 62–70	1-1	Alumni Hall; Queens, NY
Tue., Dec. 6, 1966 no, no		St. Joseph's	L 82–86	1-2	McDonough Gymnasium; Washington, DC
Sat., Dec. 10, 1966 no, no		Catholic	W 91–78	2-2	McDonough Gymnasium; Washington, DC
Wed., Dec. 14, 1966 no, no		George Washington	W 52–51	3-2	McDonough Gymnasium; Washington, DC
Sat., Dec. 17, 1966 no, no		at Canisius	L 77–80	3-3	Buffalo Memorial Auditorium; Buffalo, NY
Mon., Dec. 19, 1966 no, no		at Rutgers	W 90–87	4-3	College Avenue Gymnasium; New Brunswick, NJ
Wed., Dec. 28, 1966 no, no		vs. Purdue; Kodak Classic	W 104–82	5-3	Rochester Community War Memorial; Rochester, NY
Thu., Dec. 29, 1966 no, no		vs. Dartmouth; Kodak/Rochester Classic	W 101–69	6-3	Rochester Community War Memorial; Rochester, NY
Wed., Jan. 4, 1967 no, no		Fairleigh Dickinson	W 76–54	7-3	McDonough Gymnasium; Washington, DC
Sat., Jan. 7, 1967 no, no		St. Peter's	W 72–70	8-3	McDonough Gymnasium; Washington, DC
Wed., Jan. 11, 1967 no, no		Navy	W 97–68	9-3	McDonough Gymnasium; Washington, DC
Sat., Jan. 14, 1967 no, no		Manhattan	L 70–76	9-4	McDonough Gymnasium; Washington, DC
Sat., Jan. 28, 1967 no, no		Fordham	L 82–85	9-5	McDonough Gymnasium; Washington, DC
Thu., Feb. 2, 1967 no, no		at Loyola Maryland	W 86–75	10-5	Alumni Gymnasium; Baltimore, MD
Sat., Feb. 4, 1967 no, no		at Fairfield	L 82–93	10-6	New Haven Arena; New Haven, CT
Thu., Feb. 9, 1967 no, no		at New York University	L 77–83	10-7	Madison Square Garden; New York, NY
Sat., Feb. 11, 1967 no, no		Maryland	W 80–49	11-7	McDonough Gymnasium; Washington, DC
Sat., Feb. 18, 1967 no, no		at Syracuse; Rivalry	L 95–108	11-8	Manley Field House; Syracuse, NY
Wed., Feb. 22, 1967 no, no		at George Washington	L 75–81	11-9	Fort Myer Gymnasium; Fort Myer, VA
Fri., Feb. 24, 1967 no, no		Boston College	L 91–103	11-10	McDonough Gymnasium; Washington, DC
Sun., Feb. 26, 1967 no, no		Seton Hall	W 81–62	12-10	McDonough Gymnasium; Washington, DC
Wed., Mar. 1, 1967 no, no		at Columbia	L 71–82	12-11	Alumni Gymnasium; New York, NY
*Non-conference game. ^{#}Rankings from AP Poll. (#) Tournament seedings in parentheses.
