= 1966–67 Kansas Jayhawks men's basketball team =

American college basketball season

1966–67 Kansas Jayhawks men's basketball

Big Eight Champions

NCAA tournament, Sweet Sixteen
- Conference: Big Eight Conference

Ranking
- Coaches: No. 4
- AP: No. 3
- Record: 23–4 (13–1 Big 8)
- Head coach: Ted Owens (3rd season)
- Assistant coaches: Sam Miranda (1st season); Bob Mulcahy (1st season)
- Captain: Ron Franz
- Home arena: Allen Fieldhouse

1966–67 Big Eight Conference men's basketball standings
	Conf.				Overall
Team	W		L	PCT	W		L	PCT
No. 3 Kansas	13	–	1	.929	23	–	4	.852
Colorado	10	–	4	.714	17	–	8	.680
Nebraska	10	–	4	.714	16	–	9	.640
Kansas State	9	–	5	.643	17	–	8	.680
Iowa State	6	–	8	.429	13	–	12	.520
Oklahoma	5	–	9	.357	8	–	17	.320
Oklahoma State	2	–	12	.143	7	–	18	.280
Missouri	1	–	13	.071	3	–	22	.120
Rankings from AP Poll

The 1966–67 Kansas Jayhawks men's basketball team represented the University of Kansas during the 1966–67 college men's basketball season.

== Roster ==
- Rodger Bohnenstiehl
- Jo Jo White
- Ron Franz
- Vernon Vanoy
- Phil Harmon
- Bruce Sloan*
- Bob Wilson
- Howard Arndt
- Rich Thomas
- Pat Davis
- George Yarnevich
- Jaye Edlger

== Schedule ==
Date time, TV	Rank^{#}	Opponent^{#}	Result	Record	Site city, state
December 1*		at Arkansas	W 73–57	1-0	Barnhill Arena; Fayetteville, AR
December 3*		Xavier	W 100–52	2-0	Allen Fieldhouse; Lawrence, KS
December 5*		Ohio State	W 94–70	3-0	Allen Fieldhouse; Lawrence, KS
December 9*		vs. Florida State	W 62–48	4-0	Ahearn Field House; Manhattan, KS
December 10*		Baylor	W 68–56	5-0	Allen Fieldhouse; Lawrence, KS
December 13*		Pacific	W 70–54	6-0	Allen Fieldhouse; Lawrence, KS
December 17*		vs. No. 2 UTEP	L 67–71	6-1	Chicago Stadium; Chicago, IL
December 19		at St. John's	L 44–68	6-2	Carnesecca Arena; New York, NY
December 28		vs. Colorado	W 72–54	7-2	Municipal Auditorium; Kansas City, MO
December 29		vs. Oklahoma	W 86–73	8-2	Municipal Auditorium; Kansas City, MO
December 30		vs. Iowa State	W 63–57	9-2	Municipal Auditorium; Kansas City, MO
January 7	No. 9	Oklahoma	W 86–73	10-2 (1-0)	Allen Fieldhouse; Lawrence, KS
January 14	No. 8	at Missouri; Border War	W 70–60	11-2 (2-0)	Brewer Fieldhouse; Columbia, MO
January 17	No. 7	Colorado	L 59–62	11-3 (2-1)	Balch Fieldhouse; Boulder, CO
January 21	No. 7	Iowa State	W 73–65	12-3 (3-1)	Allen Fieldhouse; Lawrence, KS
February 4	No. 7	at Iowa State	W 68–50	13-3 (4-1)	The Armory; Ames, IA
February 7	No. 7	Nebraska	W 84–58	14-3 (5-1)	Allen Fieldhouse; Lawrence, KS
February 11	No. 7	at Kansas State; Sunflower Showdown	W 60–55	15-3 (6-1)	Ahearn Field House; Manhattan, KS
February 13	No. 7	Oklahoma State	W 52–39	16-3 (7-1)	Allen Fieldhouse; Lawrence, KS
February 18	No. 6	at Oklahoma	W 82–74	17-3 (8-1)	Field House; Norman, OK
February 20	No. 6	at Oklahoma State	W 60–50	18-3 (9-1)	Gallagher-Iba Arena; Stillwater, OK
February 25	No. 4	Missouri; Border War	W 90–55	19-3 (10-1)	Allen Fieldhouse; Lawrence, KS
March 4	No. 4	at Nebraska	W 64–57	20-3 (11-1)	Nebraska Coliseum; Lincoln, NE
March 6	No. 4	Colorado	W 66–59	21-3 (12-1)	Allen Fieldhouse; Lawrence, KS
March 11	No. 4	Kansas State; Sunflower Showdown	W 74–56	22-3 (13-1)	Allen Fieldhouse; Lawrence, KS
March 17*	No. 3	No. 7 Houston; NCAA regional semifinals	L 53–66	22-4	Allen Fieldhouse; Lawrence, KS
March 18	No. 3	No. 2 Louisville; NCAA Regional Third Place	W 70–68	23-4	Allen Fieldhouse; Lawrence, KS
*Non-conference game. ^{#}Rankings from AP Poll. (#) Tournament seedings in parentheses.
