= 1966–67 Washington Huskies men's basketball team =

American college basketball season

1966–67 Washington Huskies men's basketball
- Conference: Athletic Association of Western Universities
- Record: 13–12 (6–8 AAWU, Pac-8)
- Head coach: Mac Duckworth (4th season)
- Home arena: Hec Edmundson Pavilion

1966–67 AAWU Conference men's basketball standings
	Conf.				Overall
Team	W		L	PCT	W		L	PCT
No. 1 UCLA	14	–	0	1.000	30	–	0	1.000
Washington State	8	–	6	.571	15	–	11	.577
Oregon State	8	–	6	.571	14	–	14	.500
Stanford	7	–	7	.500	15	–	11	.577
California	6	–	8	.429	17	–	10	.630
Washington	6	–	8	.429	13	–	12	.520
USC	6	–	8	.429	13	–	12	.520
Oregon	1	–	13	.071	9	–	17	.346
Rankings from AP Poll

The 1966–67 Washington Huskies men's basketball team represented the University of Washington for the 1966–67 NCAA University Division basketball season. Led by fourth-year head coach Mac Duckworth, the Huskies were members of the Athletic Association of Western Universities (Pacific-8) and played their home games on campus at Hec Edmundson Pavilion in Seattle, Washington.

The Huskies were 13–12 overall in the regular season and 6–8 in conference play, tied for fifth in the standings.
