= 1966–67 Auburn Tigers men's basketball team =

American college basketball season

1966–67 Auburn Tigers men's basketball

Mobile Classic champions
- Conference: Southeastern Conference
- Record: 17–8 (12–6 SEC)
- Head coach: Bill Lynn (4th season)
- Captain: Bobby Buisson
- Home arena: Auburn Sports Arena

The 1966–67 Auburn Tigers men's basketball team represented Auburn University in the 1966–67 college basketball season. The team's head coach was Bill Lynn, who was in his fourth season at Auburn. The team played their home games at Auburn Sports Arena in Auburn, Alabama. They finished the season 17–8, 12–6 in SEC play.
