= Lynn Shackelford =

American basketball player

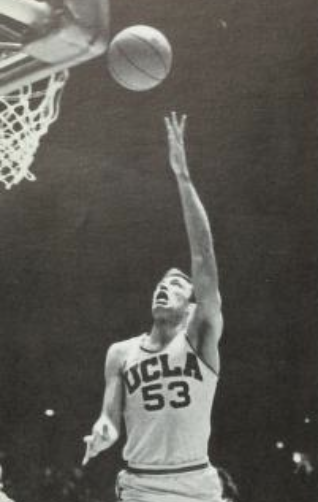
- Shackelford with the Bruins during 1968–69 season

Personal information
- Born: August 27, 1947 (age 79) Burbank, California, U.S.
- Listed height: 6 ft 5 in (1.96 m)
- Listed weight: 190 lb (86 kg)

Career information
- High school: John Burroughs (Burbank, California)
- College: UCLA (1966–1969)
- NBA draft: 1969: 6th round, 91st overall pick
- Drafted by: San Diego Rockets
- Playing career: 1969–1970
- Position: Small forward
- Number: 23

Career history
- 1969–1970: Miami Floridians

Career highlights
- 3× NCAA champion (1967–1969)
- Stats at Basketball Reference

Ray Lynn Shackelford (born August 27, 1947) is an American former professional basketball player.

A graduate of John Burroughs High School in Burbank, California, Shackelford earned 7 varsity letters in 3 years in basketball, baseball and golf. He was the CIF Player of the Year in basketball in 1965 for the Southern California Section. In his senior season, 1965, he averaged 25.6 points a game including two high games of 43 points.

A 6'5" forward, Shackelford played college basketball at UCLA under legendary coach John Wooden. He was one of only 4 players to have started on 3 NCAA championship teams (67, 68, 69). The others are Lew Alcindor, Curtis Rowe and Henry Bibby. He complemented his teammates as a dead eye pure shooter; most of his shots would be 3 pointers today.

Shackelford played part of one season in the American Basketball Association as a member of the Miami Floridians. He was later a broadcaster for ESPN, CBS, and NBC. Additionally he spent 7 seasons broadcasting all Los Angeles Lakers games with Chick Hearn. He worked on the crew of the American game show Almost Anything Goes, and was sports director for the 10 PM news for 5 years on KHJ-TV(Channel 9).

He was inducted into the UCLA Athletic Hall of Fame as a member of the 2023 class.
