= 1966–67 Dayton Flyers men's basketball team =

American college basketball season

1966–67 Dayton Flyers men's basketball

NCAA tournament, runner-up

National Championship Game, L 64-79 vs. UCLA
- Conference: Independent
- Record: 25–6
- Head coach: Don Donoher (3rd season)
- Assistant coaches: Chuck Grigsby; Chuck Izor
- Home arena: University of Dayton Fieldhouse

1966–67 NCAA University Division men's basketball independents standings
	Conf.				Overall
Team	W		L	PCT	W		L	PCT
No. 9 Boston College		–		–	21	–	3	.875
No. 7 Houston		–		–	27	–	4	.871
St. John's		–		–	23	–	5	.821
Dayton		–		–	25	–	6	.806
No. 10 Texas Western		–		–	22	–	6	.786
St. Francis (PA)		–		–	20	–	6	.769
Syracuse		–		–	20	–	6	.769
Utah State		–		–	20	–	6	.769
Rutgers		–		–	22	–	7	.759
Providence		–		–	21	–	7	.750
VPI		–		–	20	–	7	.741
Marquette		–		–	21	–	9	.700
Seattle		–		–	18	–	8	.692
DePaul		–		–	17	–	8	.680
Georgia Tech		–		–	17	–	9	.654
Hardin–Simmons		–		–	17	–	9	.654
Memphis State		–		–	17	–	9	.654
Villanova		–		–	17	–	9	.654
Holy Cross		–		–	16	–	9	.640
Army		–		–	13	–	8	.619
Oklahoma City		–		–	16	–	10	.615
Loyola Chicago		–		–	13	–	9	.591
St. Bonaventure		–		–	13	–	9	.591
Canisius		–		–	14	–	10	.583
Tulane		–		–	14	–	10	.583
Miami (FL)		–		–	15	–	11	.577
New Mexico State		–		–	15	–	11	.577
Fairfield		–		–	12	–	9	.571
Colorado State		–		–	13	–	10	.565
Fordham		–		–	14	–	11	.560
Georgetown		–		–	12	–	11	.522
Notre Dame		–		–	14	–	14	.500
Xavier		–		–	13	–	13	.500
Loyola (LA)		–		–	11	–	11	.500
Creighton		–		–	12	–	13	.480
Niagara		–		–	12	–	13	.480
Navy		–		–	8	–	10	.444
Colgate		–		–	10	–	13	.435
Florida State		–		–	11	–	15	.423
Penn State		–		–	10	–	14	.417
Detroit		–		–	10	–	15	.400
Portland		–		–	10	–	16	.385
Butler		–		–	9	–	17	.346
Centenary		–		–	9	–	17	.346
Jacksonville		–		–	8	–	17	.320
Duquesne		–		–	7	–	15	.318
Air Force		–		–	6	–	18	.250
Pittsburgh		–		–	6	–	19	.240
Boston University		–		–	4	–	18	.182
West Texas State		–		–	1	–	18	.053
Rankings from AP Poll

The 1966–67 Dayton Flyers men's basketball team represented the University of Dayton during the 1966–67 NCAA University Division men's basketball season. The Flyers, led by head coach Don Donoher, played their home games at the University of Dayton Fieldhouse and were an NCAA independent. Dayton received a bid to the NCAA tournament as a participant in the Mideast region where they made a run to the national championship game. The Flyers upset No. 6 Western Kentucky 69–67 in overtime in the opening round, No. 8 seed Tennessee 53–52 in the regional semifinal, and advanced to the school's only Final Four with a victory over Virginia Tech, 71–66 in overtime. They beat No. 4 North Carolina in the national semifinal, 76–62, before falling to unbeaten No. 1 UCLA and sophomore phenom Lew Alcindor, 79–64. Dayton finished the season 25–6.

== Roster ==
1966–67 Dayton Flyers men's basketball team
Players
Coaches

Pos.	#	Name	Height	Weight	Year	Previous school	Hometown
F	21	Don May	6 ft 4 in (1.93 m)	195 lb (88 kg)	Jr	Belmont	Dayton, Ohio
G	22	Rudy Waterman	6 ft 1 in (1.85 m)	—	Jr
C	31	Dan Obrovac	6 ft 10 in (2.08 m)	—	So
G	42	Bobby Hooper	6 ft 0 in (1.83 m)	180 lb (82 kg)	Jr	Simon Kenton	Lees Creek, Ohio
F	43	Glinder Torain	6 ft 6 in (1.98 m)	—	Jr

Head coach

- Don Donoher (Dayton)

Assistant coach(es)

Legend

- (C) Team captain
- (S) Suspended
- (I) Ineligible
- (W) Walk-on
- Injured
- Current redshirt

== Schedule and results ==
Date time, TV	Rank^{#}	Opponent^{#}	Result	Record	Site (attendance) city, state
Regular season
Dec 1, 1966*		Baldwin Wallace	W 95–81	1–0	University of Dayton Fieldhouse (5,882); Dayton, Ohio
Dec 3, 1966*		at Saint Louis	W 80–78	2–0	Kiel Auditorium (7,120); St. Louis, Missouri
Dec 6, 1966*		at Miami (OH)	W 80–71	3–0	Withrow Court (2,144); Oxford, Ohio
Dec 10, 1966*		Eastern Kentucky	W 104–82	4–0	University of Dayton Fieldhouse (5,882); Dayton, Ohio
Dec 15, 1966*		Tampa	W 111–64	5–0	University of Dayton Fieldhouse (5,882); Dayton, Ohio
Dec 17, 1966*		at No. 3 Louisville	L 81–96	5–1	Freedom Hall (14,602); Louisville, Kentucky
Dec 20, 1966*		East Carolina	W 86–66	6–1	University of Dayton Fieldhouse (5,882); Baton Rouge, Louisiana
Dec 23, 1966*		at Loyola (IL)	W 100–90	7–1	Alumni Gym (6,059); Chicago, Illinois
Dec 28, 1966*		Marquette	W 95–76	8–1	University of Dayton Fieldhouse (5,882); Dayton, Ohio
Dec 30, 1966*		New Mexico State	W 74–48	9–1	University of Dayton Fieldhouse (5,882); Dayton, Ohio
Jan 2, 1967*		Harvard	W 100–78	10–1	University of Dayton Fieldhouse (5,882); Dayton, Ohio
Jan 4, 1967*		at Xavier; Rivalry	W 75–72	11–1	Schmidt Fieldhouse (4,802); Cincinnati, Ohio
Jan 10, 1967*		Cincinnati	L 49–62	11–2	University of Dayton Fieldhouse (5,882); Dayton, Ohio
Jan 14, 1967*		at Detroit	W 94–75	12–2	Calihan Hall (3,736); Detroit, Michigan
Jan 18, 1967*		No. 2 Louisville	L 50–66	12–3	University of Dayton Fieldhouse (5,882); Dayton, Ohio
Jan 21, 1967*		DePaul	W 81–65	13–3	University of Dayton Fieldhouse (5,882); Dayton, Ohio
Jan 25, 1967*		Canisius	W 83–59	14–3	University of Dayton Fieldhouse (5,882); Dayton, Ohio
Jan 28, 1967*		Miami (OH)	W 71–55	15–3	University of Dayton Fieldhouse (5,882); Dayton, Ohio
Feb 4, 1967*		at Niagara	L 74–80	15–4	Gallagher Center (3,200); Lewiston, New York
Feb 8, 1967*		Xavier; Rivalry	W 70–66	16–4	University of Dayton Fieldhouse (5,882); Dayton, Ohio
Feb 11, 1967*		at Memphis State	W 81–56	17–4	Mid-South Coliseum (11,001); Memphis, Tennessee
Feb 15, 1967*		Northern Illinois	W 101–60	18–4	University of Dayton Fieldhouse (5,882); Dayton, Ohio
Feb 18, 1967*		at Loyola (LA)	W 101–71	19–4	Loyola Field House (1,500); New Orleans, Louisiana
Feb 21, 1967*		at Miami (FL)	W 80–79	20–4	Miami Beach Convention Center (2,283); Miami, Florida
Feb 25, 1967*		Chattanooga	W 98–66	21–4	University of Dayton Fieldhouse (5,882); Dayton, Ohio
Mar 4, 1967*		at DePaul	L 79–84	21–5	Alumni Hall (4,362); Chicago, Illinois
NCAA Tournament
Mar 11, 1967*		vs. No. 6 Western Kentucky; First round	W 69–67 ^{OT}	22–5	Memorial Coliseum (11,500); Lexington, Kentucky
Mar 17, 1967*		vs. No. 8 Tennessee; Mideast Regional semifinal – Sweet Sixteen	W 53–52	23–5	McGaw Memorial Hall (7,386); Evanston, Illinois
Mar 18, 1967*		vs. Virginia Tech; Mideast Regional final – Elite Eight	W 71–66 ^{OT}	24–5	McGaw Memorial Hall (7,419); Evanston, Illinois
Mar 24, 1967*		vs. No. 4 North Carolina; National semifinal – Final Four	W 76–62	25–5	Freedom Hall (18,889); Louisville, Kentucky
Mar 25, 1967*		vs. No. 1 UCLA; National Championship	L 64–79	25–6	Freedom Hall (18,892); Louisville, Kentucky
*Non-conference game. ^{#}Rankings from AP Poll. (#) Tournament seedings in parentheses. All times are in Eastern Time.
