= 1966–67 Houston Cougars men's basketball team =

American college basketball season

1966–67 Houston Cougars men's basketball
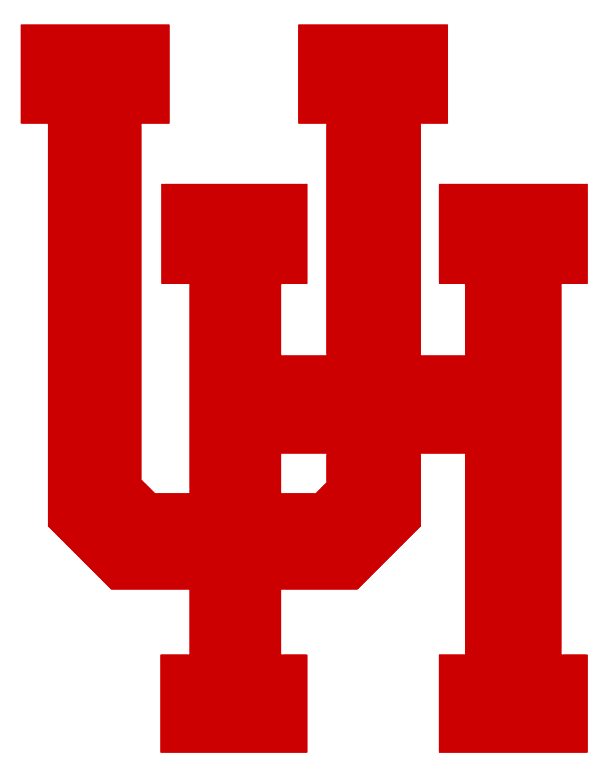

NCAA tournament, Third place
- Conference: Independent

Ranking
- Coaches: No. 6
- AP: No. 7
- Record: 27–4
- Head coach: Guy Lewis (11th season)
- Assistant coach: Harvey Pate
- Home arena: Delmar Fieldhouse

1966–67 NCAA University Division men's basketball independents standings
	Conf.				Overall
Team	W		L	PCT	W		L	PCT
No. 9 Boston College		–		–	21	–	3	.875
No. 7 Houston		–		–	27	–	4	.871
St. John's		–		–	23	–	5	.821
Dayton		–		–	25	–	6	.806
No. 10 Texas Western		–		–	22	–	6	.786
St. Francis (PA)		–		–	20	–	6	.769
Syracuse		–		–	20	–	6	.769
Utah State		–		–	20	–	6	.769
Rutgers		–		–	22	–	7	.759
Providence		–		–	21	–	7	.750
VPI		–		–	20	–	7	.741
Marquette		–		–	21	–	9	.700
Seattle		–		–	18	–	8	.692
DePaul		–		–	17	–	8	.680
Georgia Tech		–		–	17	–	9	.654
Hardin–Simmons		–		–	17	–	9	.654
Memphis State		–		–	17	–	9	.654
Villanova		–		–	17	–	9	.654
Holy Cross		–		–	16	–	9	.640
Army		–		–	13	–	8	.619
Oklahoma City		–		–	16	–	10	.615
Loyola Chicago		–		–	13	–	9	.591
St. Bonaventure		–		–	13	–	9	.591
Canisius		–		–	14	–	10	.583
Tulane		–		–	14	–	10	.583
Miami (FL)		–		–	15	–	11	.577
New Mexico State		–		–	15	–	11	.577
Fairfield		–		–	12	–	9	.571
Colorado State		–		–	13	–	10	.565
Fordham		–		–	14	–	11	.560
Georgetown		–		–	12	–	11	.522
Notre Dame		–		–	14	–	14	.500
Xavier		–		–	13	–	13	.500
Loyola (LA)		–		–	11	–	11	.500
Creighton		–		–	12	–	13	.480
Niagara		–		–	12	–	13	.480
Navy		–		–	8	–	10	.444
Colgate		–		–	10	–	13	.435
Florida State		–		–	11	–	15	.423
Penn State		–		–	10	–	14	.417
Detroit		–		–	10	–	15	.400
Portland		–		–	10	–	16	.385
Butler		–		–	9	–	17	.346
Centenary		–		–	9	–	17	.346
Jacksonville		–		–	8	–	17	.320
Duquesne		–		–	7	–	15	.318
Air Force		–		–	6	–	18	.250
Pittsburgh		–		–	6	–	19	.240
Boston University		–		–	4	–	18	.182
West Texas State		–		–	1	–	18	.053
Rankings from AP Poll

The 1966–67 Houston Cougars men's basketball team represented the University of Houston in the 1966–67 NCAA University Division men's basketball season. The team played its home games at Delmar Fieldhouse in Houston for the first time. This season marked the team's eighth year as an independent member of the NCAA's University Division. Houston was led by eleventh-year head coach Guy Lewis.

At the conclusion of the regular season, the Cougars finished with a 23–3 overall record. Additionally, they finished seventh in the AP Poll, sixth in the Coaches Poll, were invited to the NCAA tournament, and finished as a third place semifinalist. It was Houston's first ever Final Four appearance.

== Roster ==
1966–67 Houston Cougars men's basketball team
Players
Coaches

Pos.	#	Name	Height	Weight	Year	Hometown
G	10	Vernon Lewis	5 ft 11 in (1.8 m)	170 lb (77 kg)	Jr	Houston, Texas
G	12	Gary Grider	6 ft 1 in (1.85 m)	175 lb (79 kg)	Sr	Washington, Indiana
C	14	Ken Spain	6 ft 9 in (2.06 m)	230 lb (104 kg)	So	Houston, Texas
G	20	David Starks	5 ft 10 in (1.78 m)	170 lb (77 kg)	Jr	Buffalo, Kentucky
F	22	Don Kruse	6 ft 8 in (2.03 m)	235 lb (107 kg)	Sr	Simms, Texas
G	24	Don Chaney	6 ft 5 in (1.96 m)	210 lb (95 kg)	Jr	Baton Rouge, Louisiana
F	30	Leary Lentz	6 ft 6 in (1.98 m)	200 lb (91 kg)	Sr	Clarkton, Missouri
G	32	Elliott McVey	5 ft 10 in (1.78 m)	170 lb (77 kg)	Jr	Yellville, Arkansas
G	34	Niemer Hamood	6 ft 0 in (1.83 m)	170 lb (77 kg)	So	Dearborn, Michigan
F	40	Theodis Lee	6 ft 7 in (2.01 m)	210 lb (95 kg)	So	Monroe, Louisiana
F	42	Andrew Benson	6 ft 7 in (2.01 m)	220 lb (100 kg)	Sr	Houston, Texas
F	44	Elvin Hayes	6 ft 8 in (2.03 m)	235 lb (107 kg)	Jr	Rayville, Louisiana
F	54	Melvin Bell	6 ft 7 in (2.01 m)	230 lb (104 kg)	So	Clinton, Oklahoma

Head coach

- Guy Lewis (Houston)

Assistant coach(es)

- Harvey Pate (Oklahoma State)

Legend

- (C) Team captain
- (S) Suspended
- (I) Ineligible
- (W) Walk-on
- Injured
- Current redshirt

Roster
Last update: 2021-05-16

== Schedule ==
Date time, TV	Rank^{#}	Opponent^{#}	Result	Record	Site city, state
Regular season
12/1/1966	No. 7	Albuquerque	W 96–84	1–0	Delmar Fieldhouse; Houston, Texas
12/3/1966	No. 7	at Minnesota	W 86–75	2–0	Williams Arena; Minneapolis, Minnesota
12/5/1966	No. 5	at Michigan	L 75–86	2–1	Yost Field House; Ann Arbor, Michigan
12/8/1966	No. 5	Southwestern Louisiana	W 89–81	3–1	Delmar Fieldhouse; Houston, Texas
12/10/1966	No. 5	Hawaii	W 93–59	4–1	Delmar Fieldhouse; Houston, Texas
12/12/1966	No. 9	Saint Mary's	W 90–74	5–1	Delmar Fieldhouse; Houston, Texas
12/14/1966	No. 9	Centenary (LA); Bluebonnet Classic	W 97–66	6–1	Delmar Fieldhouse; Houston, Texas
12/15/1966	No. 9	Idaho State; Bluebonnet Classic	W 111–65	7–1	Delmar Fieldhouse; Houston, Texas
12/17/1966	No. 9	San Francisco; Bluebonnet Classic	W 90–75	8–1	Delmar Fieldhouse; Houston, Texas
12/20/1966	No. 8	Washington; Bluebonnet Classic	W 87–65	9–1	Delmar Fieldhouse; Houston, Texas
12/28/1966	No. 6	vs. Kent State; Holiday Tournament	W 85–73	10–1	Indian Field House; Jonesboro, Arkansas
12/29/1966	No. 6	at Arkansas State; Holiday Tournament	W 68–58	11–1	Indian Field House; Jonesboro, Arkansas
1/2/1967	No. 5	Tennessee Tech	W 95–69	12–1	Delmar Fieldhouse; Houston, Texas
1/5/1967	No. 5	at Lamar Tech	W 82–62	13–1	McDonald Gym; Beaumont, Texas
1/14/1967	No. 4	West Texas State	W 103–72	14–1	Delmar Fieldhouse; Houston, Texas
1/28/1967	No. 3	at Washington	L 78–81	14–2	Hec Edmundson Pavilion; Seattle, Washington
1/31/1967	No. 6	at Nevada Southern	W 103–83	15–2	NSU Gym; Paradise, Nevada
2/9/1967	No. 5	Hardin–Simmons	W 92–85	16–2	Delmar Fieldhouse; Houston, Texas
2/11/1967	No. 5	at Notre Dame	L 78–87	16–3	Notre Dame Fieldhouse; Notre Dame, Indiana
2/13/1967	No. 7	at Creighton	W 87–80	17–3	Omaha Civic Auditorium; Omaha, Nebraska
2/15/1967	No. 7	St. Mary's	W 122–58	18–3	Delmar Fieldhouse; Houston, Texas
2/18/1967	No. 7	at Miami (FL)	W 105–86	19–3	Miami Beach Exhibition Hall; Miami Beach, Florida
2/23/1967	No. 7	at West Texas State	W 120–76	20–3	West Texas State Fieldhouse; Canyon, Texas
2/25/1967	No. 7	Creighton	W 87–73	21–3	Delmar Fieldhouse; Houston, Texas
2/28/1967	No. 7	Loyola (LA)	W 106–64	22–3	Delmar Fieldhouse; Houston, Texas
3/4/1967	No. 7	at Air Force	W 90–80	23–3	Cadet Gymnasium; Colorado Springs, Colorado
NCAA tournament
3/11/1967	No. 7	vs. New Mexico State; Regional quarterfinals – First round	W 59–58	24–3	Moby Gymnasium; Fort Collins, Colorado
3/17/1967	No. 7	at No. 3 Kansas; Regional semifinals – Sweet Sixteen	W 66–53	25–3	Allen Fieldhouse; Lawrence, Kansas
3/19/1967	No. 7	vs. SMU; Regional finals – Elite Eight	W 83–75	26–3	Allen Fieldhouse; Lawrence, Kansas
3/24/1967	No. 7	vs. No. 1 UCLA; Final Four	L 58–73	26–4	Freedom Hall; Louisville, Kentucky
3/25/1967	No. 7	vs. No. 4 North Carolina; Third-place game	W 84–62	27–4	Freedom Hall; Louisville, Kentucky
*Non-conference game. ^{#}Rankings from AP Poll. (#) Tournament seedings in parentheses.

== Rankings ==
Ranking movements Legend: ██ Increase in ranking ██ Decrease in ranking
	Week															
Poll	Pre	1	2	3	4	5	6	7	8	9	10	11	12	13	14	Final
AP	7	7	5	9	8	6	5	4	3	3	6	5	7	7	7	7
Coaches	6	6	5	13	8	8	6	5	4	3	5	5	8	7	6	6
