= Thomas J. Frericks Center =

Multi-purpose arena in Dayton, Ohio

Coordinates: 39.7388°N 84.1791°W

The Thomas J. Frericks Center is a 5,000-seat multi-purpose arena in Dayton, Ohio, United States. It is the home of the University of Dayton Flyers volleyball teams.

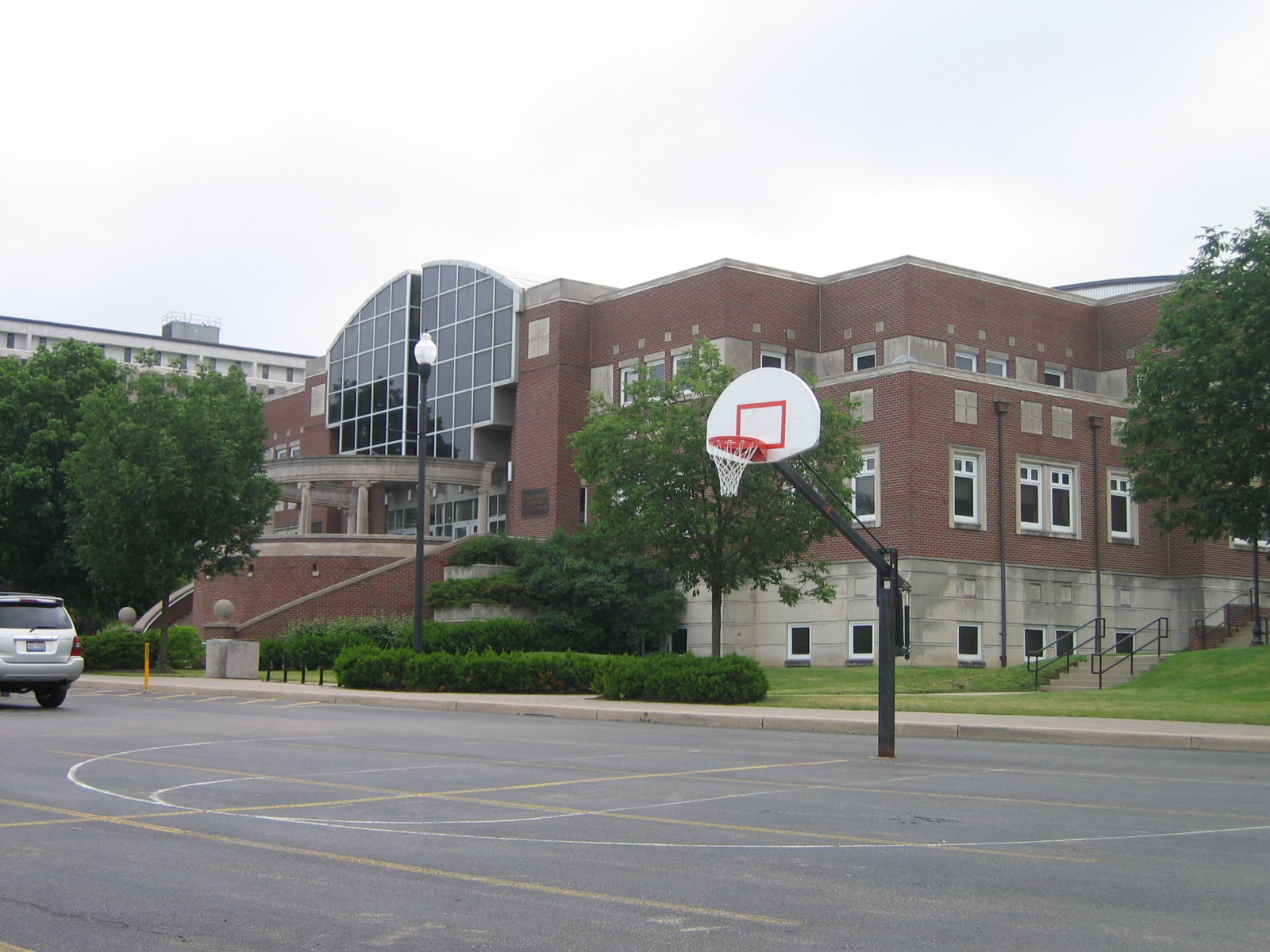
2008

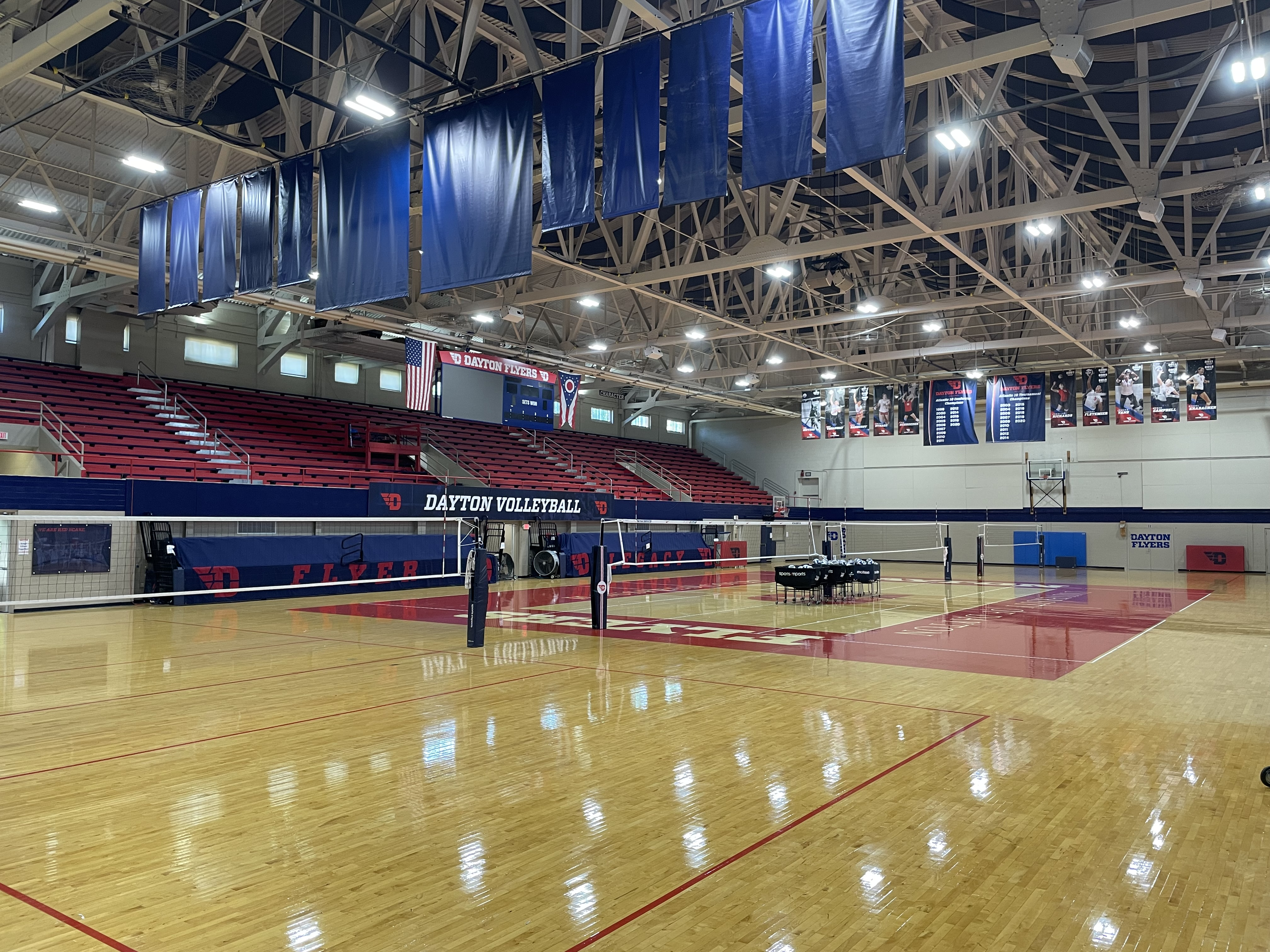
The arena in 2022

== History ==
Before 1950, the Flyers men's basketball team played its home games at the Montgomery County Fairgrounds Coliseum. On May 3, 1949, the university broke ground on a $600,000 on-campus basketball facility at the corner of Alberta and L streets. Completed the following year, the facility could seat 5,800 patrons for basketball. The Fieldhouse served as Dayton's home court from 1950 to 1969, with the Flyers compiling a 256-33 record in the facility.

Upon completion of the UD Arena, the Fieldhouse served as a training facility for sports teams, a recreation complex for UD students and office space for the athletic department. In 1975, the Physical Activities Center was built and joined to the south side of the Fieldhouse. In the late 1980s, the University renovated the interior of the facility and updated the western external facade of the Fieldhouse. Following the death of longtime athletic director Tom Frericks, the university renamed the Fieldhouse in his honor.

== Current use ==
The Frericks Center is the third-largest volleyball-only venue in the NCAA with a seating capacity of 5,000. In 2004, the university completed a seating renovation and environmental graphics package. The facility also houses volleyball administrative offices.
