= 1966–67 UCLA Bruins men's basketball team =

American college basketball season

1966–67 UCLA Bruins men's basketball

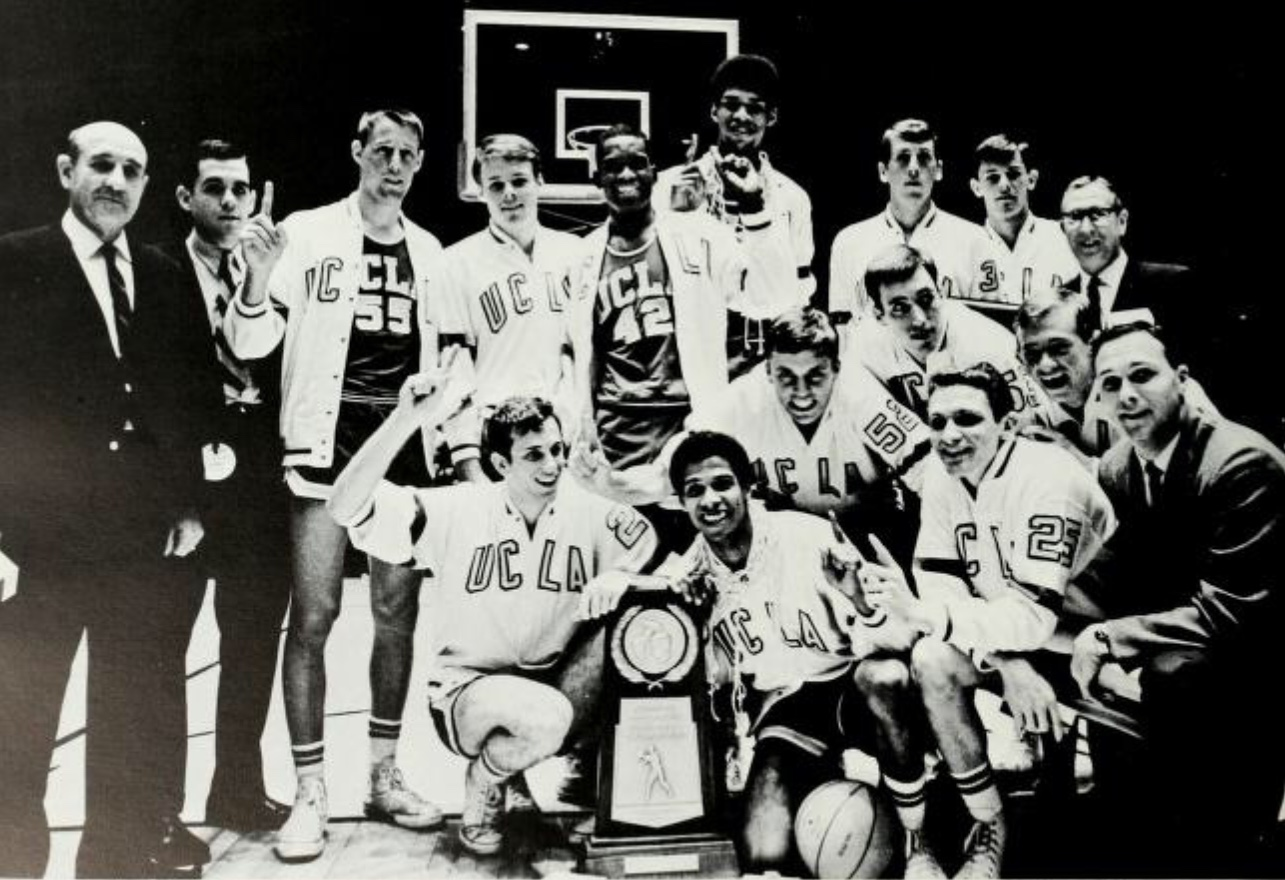

NCAA tournament National champions NCAA regular season champions AAWU regular season champions

National Championship Game, W 79–64 vs. Dayton
- Conference: Athletic Association of Western Universities

Ranking
- Coaches: No. 1
- AP: No. 1
- Record: 30–0 (14–0 AAWU (Pac-8))
- Head coach: John Wooden (19th season)
- Assistant coach: Jerry Norman
- Home arena: Pauley Pavilion

1966–67 AAWU Conference men's basketball standings
	Conf.				Overall
Team	W		L	PCT	W		L	PCT
No. 1 UCLA	14	–	0	1.000	30	–	0	1.000
Washington State	8	–	6	.571	15	–	11	.577
Oregon State	8	–	6	.571	14	–	14	.500
Stanford	7	–	7	.500	15	–	11	.577
California	6	–	8	.429	17	–	10	.630
Washington	6	–	8	.429	13	–	12	.520
USC	6	–	8	.429	13	–	12	.520
Oregon	1	–	13	.071	9	–	17	.346
Rankings from AP Poll

The 1966–67 UCLA Bruins men's basketball team won UCLA's third NCAA national championship under head coach John Wooden with a win over Dayton. The Bruins went undefeated, winning all 30 games.

In the NCAA West Regional at Corvallis, Oregon, the Bruins beat Wyoming (109–60) and Pacific (80–64). The Final Four was played in Louisville, Kentucky, where UCLA defeated Houston (73–58) and Dayton (79–64).

The Bruins were led by starters Lynn Shackelford, Kenny Heitz, Lew Alcindor, Mike Warren, and Lucius Allen.

The Bruins entered the season ranked number 1, beginning what was then the most consecutive weeks ranked in the AP poll. The streak ended at 221 weeks in January 1980 and has since been surpassed by the Kansas Jayhawks.

== Season summary ==
This was the season Lew Alcindor, later known as Kareem Abdul-Jabbar, debuted on to the college basketball scene. After playing on the freshman team under then NCAA rules, Alcindor dominated at the varsity level as a sophomore, leading UCLA to an undefeated 30–0 record while averaging 29.0 points and 15.5 rebounds. Three other players averaged in double figures, including sophomore guard Lucius Allen and junior Mike Warren.

== Roster ==
1966–67 UCLA Bruins men's basketball team
Players
Coaches

Pos.	#	Name	Height	Weight	Year	Hometown
C	33	Lew Alcindor	7 ft 2 in (2.18 m)	225 lb (102 kg)	So	New York, New York
G	42	Lucius Allen	6 ft 2 in (1.88 m)	175 lb (79 kg)	So	Kansas City, KS
F	55	Joe Chrisman	6 ft 3 in (1.91 m)	—
G	22	Kenny Heitz	6 ft 3 in (1.91 m)	—	So	Santa Monica, CA
F	52	Dick Lynn	6 ft 2 in (1.88 m)	—	So
F	34	Jim Nielsen	—	—
G	25	Don Saffer	6 ft 1 in (1.85 m)	—
C	30	Neville Saner	6 ft 6 in (1.98 m)	—
F	53	Lynn Shackelford	6 ft 5 in (1.96 m)	190 lb (86 kg)	So	Burbank, CA
G	24	Gene Sutherland	6 ft 1 in (1.85 m)	—
G	45	Bill Sweek	6 ft 3 in (1.91 m)	—	So	Pasadena, CA
G	23	Michael Warren	5 ft 11 in (1.8 m)	—	Jr	South Bend, IN

Head coach

John Wooden (Purdue)

Assistant coach(es)

- Jerry Norman

Legend

- (C) Team captain
- (S) Suspended
- (I) Ineligible
- (W) Walk-on
- Injured
- Current redshirt

Roster

== Schedule ==
Date time, TV	Rank^{#}	Opponent^{#}	Result	Record	Site city, state
Regular Season
December 3, 1966*	No. 1	USC	W 105-90	1–0	Pauley Pavilion; Los Angeles, CA
December 9, 1966*	No. 1	No. 7 Duke	W 98–54	2–0	Pauley Pavilion; Los Angeles, CA
December 10, 1966*	No. 1	No. 7 Duke	W 107–67	3–0	Pauley Pavilion; Los Angeles, CA
December 22, 1966*	No. 1	Colorado State	W 104–74	4–0	Pauley Pavilion; Los Angeles, CA
December 23, 1966*	No. 1	Notre Dame	W 96–67	5–0	Pauley Pavilion; Los Angeles, CA
December 28, 1966*	No. 1	Wisconsin; L.A. Classic	W 122–56	6–0	Pauley Pavilion; Los Angeles, CA
December 29, 1966*	No. 1	Georgia Tech; L.A. Classic	W 101–72	7–0	Pauley Pavilion; Los Angeles, CA
December 30, 1966*	No. 1	USC; L.A. Classic	W 107–73	8–0	Pauley Pavilion; Los Angeles, CA
January 7, 1967	No. 1	at Washington State	W 76–57	9–0 (1–0)	Bohler Gymnasium; Pullman, WA
January 9, 1967	No. 1	at Washington	W 99–68	10–0 (2–0)	Hec Edmundson Pavilion; Seattle, WA
January 13, 1967	No. 1	California	W 106–78	11–0 (3–0)	Pauley Pavilion; Los Angeles, CA
January 14, 1967	No. 1	Stanford	W 116–78	12–0 (4–0)	Pauley Pavilion; Los Angeles, CA
January 20, 1967*	No. 1	Portland	W 122–57	13–0	Pauley Pavilion; Los Angeles, CA
January 21, 1967*	No. 1	UC Santa Barbara	W 119–75	14–0	Pauley Pavilion; Los Angeles, CA
January 28, 1967*	No. 1	at Loyola–Chicago	W 102–67	15–0	Chicago Stadium; Chicago, IL
January 29, 1967*	No. 1	at Illinois	W 120–82	16–0	Chicago Stadium (10,025); Chicago, IL
February 4, 1967	No. 1	at USC	W 40-35 ^{9-4}	17–0 (5–0)	Los Angeles Memorial Sports Arena; Los Angeles, CA
February 10, 1967	No. 1	Oregon State	W 76–44	18–0 (6–0)	Pauley Pavilion; Los Angeles, CA
February 11, 1967	No. 1	Oregon	W 100–56	19–0 (7–0)	Pauley Pavilion; Los Angeles, CA
February 17, 1967	No. 1	at Oregon	W 84–51	20–0 (8–0)	McArthur Court; Eugene, OR
February 18, 1967	No. 1	at Oregon State	W 92–50	21–0 (9–0)	Gill Coliseum; Corvallis, OR
February 24, 1967	No. 1	Washington	W 101–63	22–0 (10–0)	Pauley Pavilion; Los Angeles, CA
February 25, 1967	No. 1	Washington State	W 100–68	23–0 (11–0)	Pauley Pavilion; Los Angeles, CA
March 3, 1967	No. 1	at Stanford	W 85–47	24–0 (12–0)	Burnham Pavilion; Stanford, CA
March 4, 1967	No. 1	at California	W 113–66	25–0 (13–0)	Harmon Gym; Berkeley, CA
March 11, 1967	No. 1	USC	W 99–55	26–0 (14–0)	Pauley Pavilion; Los Angeles, CA
NCAA Tournament
March 17, 1967*	No. 1	vs. Wyoming; Regional semifinals	W 109–60	27–0	Gill Coliseum; Corvallis, OR
March 18, 1967*	No. 1	vs. Pacific; Regional Finals	W 80–64	28–0	Gill Coliseum; Corvallis, OR
March 24, 1967*	No. 1	vs. No. 7 Houston; National semifinals	W 73–58	29–0	Freedom Hall; Louisville, KY
March 25, 1967*; 6:30 pm	No. 1	vs. Dayton; National Championship Game	W 79–64	30–0	Freedom Hall; Louisville, KY
*Non-conference game. ^{#}Rankings from AP Poll. (#) Tournament seedings in parentheses. W=West. All times are in Pacific time.

== Rankings ==
Ranking movements
	Week														
Poll	Pre	1	2	3	4	5	6	7	8	9	10	11	12	13	Final
AP	1	1	1	1	1	1	1	1	1	1	1	1	1	1	1
Coaches	1	1	1	1	1	1	1	1	1	1	1	1	1	1	1

== Notes ==
- UCLA won the L.A. Classic by defeating Wisconsin, Georgia Tech, and USC.
- Bruins' third national championship in four years.
- The dunk was banned in college basketball after the season, primarily because of Alcindor's dominant use of the shot.

== Awards and honors ==
- Lew Alcindor, NCAA basketball tournament MOP (1967)
- Lew Alcindor, USBWA College Player of the Year
- Lew Alcindor, Helms Foundation Player of the Year award
- Lew Alcindor, First Team All-American
- Lew Alcindor, School Record, Most season Points: 870 (1967)
- Lew Alcindor, School Record, Highest season Scoring Average: 29.0 (1967)
- Lew Alcindor, School Record, Most season Field Goals: 346 (1967)
- Lew Alcindor, School Record, Most season Free Throw Attempts: 274 (1967)
- Lew Alcindor, School Record, Most single game field goals: 26 (vs. Washington State, 2/25/67)
