= Don Donoher =

American basketball coach (1932–2024)

Biographical details
- Born: January 21, 1932; Toledo, Ohio, U.S.
- Died: April 12, 2024 (aged 92); Dayton, Ohio, U.S.

Playing career
- 1951–1954: Dayton

Coaching career (HC unless noted)
- 1963–1964: Dayton (assistant)
- 1964–1989: Dayton
- 1989–1990: Indiana (assistant)

Administrative career (AD unless noted)
- 1976–1980: Dayton

Head coaching record
- Overall: 437–275 (.614)
- Tournaments: 11–10 (NCAA); 10–6 (NIT)

Accomplishments and honors

Championships
- NIT (1968)
- College Basketball Hall of Fame; Inducted in 2015

Donald Donoher (January 21, 1932 – April 12, 2024) was an American college basketball coach and athletics administrator. He served as the head men's basketball coach at the University of Dayton from 1964 to 1989, compiling a record of 437–275. His Dayton Flyers were champions of the 1968 National Invitation Tournament and runners-up at the 1967 NCAA University Division basketball tournament. Donoher was also the athletic director at Dayton from 1976 to 1980.

== Early years ==
Donoher began his career as a basketball player at Central Catholic High School in Toledo, Ohio from 1947 to 1950. He played three years of varsity basketball for coach Tom Blackburn at the University of Dayton, scoring 578 career points in 72 games. Following graduation from Dayton in 1954, Donoher served a two-year enlistment in the United States Army. Returning to Dayton after the end of his service, Donoher accepted a part-time basketball scout position offered by Blackburn. In February 1963, Blackburn made Donoher the university's first full-time assistant coach.

Blackburn had been suffering from cancer for most of the 1963–64 season. When the disease's effects became too debilitating for him to continue, Donoher took over as interim coach for the last three games of the season. In March 1964, Blackburn died from cancer, and Donoher was formally named his successor. However, Dayton credits the entire 1963–64 season to Blackburn.

== Head coaching experience ==
Donoher enjoyed immediate success as a head coach, going 22–7 in his inaugural season and guiding the Flyers to a berth in the NCAA tournament, reaching the Sweet Sixteen. Two years later, Donoher's Flyers defeated Western Kentucky University, the University of Tennessee, Virginia Tech, and the University of North Carolina en route to a national runner-up finish in the NCAA tournament. During his tenure at Dayton, Donoher guided the Flyers to the NCAA tournament eight times, reaching the Sweet Sixteen five times, the Elite Eight twice, and the national final once. Additionally, Dayton played in seven NIT post-season competitions under Donoher, winning the championship in 1968. Donoher is Dayton's all-time winningest coach with a 437–275 record (.614), including a 20–16 post season record (.556). Donoher-coached teams were noted for their discipline, tenacity, and sound fundamentals, frequently besting teams with greater athleticism. Donoher served as an assistant to head coach Bobby Knight on the gold medal-winning U.S. men's basketball team at the 1984 Summer Olympic Games.

== Awards and recognition ==
Donoher was inducted into the Toledo Area High School Hall of Fame, the Ohio High School Basketball Coaches Association Hall of Fame, and the University of Dayton Hall of Fame. On November 20, 2015, Donoher was inducted into the National Collegiate Basketball Hall of Fame alongside fellow Final Four coach Lou Henson. In 2017, Donoher received the prestigious Dean Smith Award from the U.S. Basketball Writers Association for embodying the spirit and values of the Hall of Fame North Carolina coach.

In 1998, the University of Dayton named the new state of the art addition to the University of Dayton Arena after Donoher.

== Later life and death ==
Donoher continued to reside in Dayton, Ohio, returning to basketball as an assistant coach at Bishop Fenwick High School in Middletown, Ohio, where grandchildren Kevin and Shannon attended. Donoher was a celebrated guest at the March 7, 2020, first-ever College GameDay broadcast from the University of Dayton.

Donoher's wife of 66 years, Sonia Donoher, died on November 17, 2020. On April 12, 2024, Don Donoher died at the age of 92. Before his death, he was the oldest living basketball coach to have coached a team in the national championship game.

== Head coaching record ==
Record table
Season	Team	Overall	Conference	Standing	Postseason
Dayton Flyers (NCAA University Division / Division I independent) (1964–1988)
1964–65	Dayton	22–7			NCAA University Division Regional Third Place
1965–66	Dayton	23–6			NCAA University Division Regional Fourth Place
1966–67	Dayton	25–6			NCAA University Division Runner-up
1967–68	Dayton	21–9			NIT Champion
1968–69	Dayton	20–7			NCAA University Division First Round
1969–70	Dayton	19–8			NCAA University Division First Round
1970–71	Dayton	18–9			NIT First Round
1971–72	Dayton	13–13			
1972–73	Dayton	13–13			
1973–74	Dayton	20–9			NCAA Division I Regional Fourth Place
1974–75	Dayton	10–16			
1975–76	Dayton	14–13			
1976–77	Dayton	16–11			
1977–78	Dayton	19–10			NIT Quarterfinal
1978–79	Dayton	19–10			NIT Second Round
1979–80	Dayton	13–14			
1980–81	Dayton	18–11			NIT Second Round
1981–82	Dayton	21–9			NIT Quarterfinal
1982–83	Dayton	18–10			
1983–84	Dayton	21–11			NCAA Division I Elite Eight
1984–85	Dayton	19–10			NCAA Division I First Round
1985–86	Dayton	17–13			NIT First Round
1986–87	Dayton	13–15			
1987–88	Dayton	13–18			
Dayton Flyers (Midwestern Collegiate Conference) (1988–1989)
1988–89	Dayton	12–17	6–6	4th	
Dayton:		437–275 (.614)	6–6 (.500)		
Total:		437–275 (.614)			
National champion Postseason invitational champion Conference regular season champion Conference regular season and conference tournament champion Division regular season champion Division regular season and conference tournament champion Conference tournament champion

== See also ==
- List of NCAA Division I Men's Final Four appearances by coach
