= 1966–67 Princeton Tigers men's basketball team =

American college basketball season

1966–67 Princeton Tigers men's basketball

Ivy League Champion

1967 NCAA Men's Division I Tournament, Regional 3rd place
- Conference: Ivy League

Ranking
- Coaches: No. 5
- AP: No. 5
- Record: 25–3 (13–1, 1st Ivy League)
- Head coach: Butch van Breda Kolff
- Captain: Ed Hummer
- Home arena: Dillon Gymnasium

1966–67 Ivy League men's basketball standings
	Conf.				Overall
Team	W		L	PCT	W		L	PCT
No. 5 Princeton	13	–	1	.929	25	–	3	.893
Cornell	11	–	3	.786	19	–	5	.792
Yale	11	–	3	.786	14	–	7	.667
Pennsylvania	7	–	7	.500	11	–	14	.440
Columbia	6	–	8	.429	11	–	14	.440
Harvard	4	–	10	.286	10	–	14	.417
Brown	3	–	11	.214	10	–	16	.385
Dartmouth	1	–	13	.071	7	–	17	.292
Rankings from AP Poll

The 1966–67 Princeton Tigers men's basketball team represented Princeton University in intercollegiate college basketball during the 1966–67 NCAA University Division men's basketball season. Butch van Breda Kolff served as head coach and the team captain was Ed Hummer. The team played its home games in the Dillon Gymnasium on the University campus in Princeton, New Jersey. The team was the champion of the Ivy League, which earned them an invitation to the 23-team 1967 NCAA Division I men's basketball tournament. This was van Breda Kolff's final year as head coach at Princeton. Upon his retirement to go coach the Los Angeles Lakers, he eclipsed R. B. Smith's fifty-eight-year-old Ivy League winning percentage record with a 76.9% mark (103–31). The record stood until Bill Carmody stepped down in 2000. His team's helped Princeton end the decade with a 72.6 winning percentage (188–71), which was the tenth best in the nation.

The team posted a 25–3 overall record and a 13–1 conference record. The team earned national ranking following its January 2, 1967 91–81 victory over number three ranked North Carolina Tar Heels at Chapel Hill, North Carolina. The team's January 14, 1967 116–42 victory over Dartmouth established the Ivy League record for margin of victory. The 116 points continues to be the Ivy League record for points scored in a conference game. During the season, the team spent nine weeks of the fifteen-week season ranked in the Associated Press Top Ten Poll, peaking at number three and ending the season ranked number five. The team also finished the season ranked number five in the final UPI Coaches' Poll. Point guard Gary Walters and center Chris Thomforde were featured on the cover of the February 27, 1967, issue of Sports Illustrated.

The team won its March 11, 1967 NCAA Division I men's basketball tournament East Regional first-round game against the West Virginia Mountaineers by a 68–57 margin at the Cassell Coliseum in Blacksburg, Virginia. Then on March 17 in the second round it lost its rematch against a North Carolina team that was ranked in the top 10 all season (no lower than fifth after the third week of the season) by a 78–70 margin in overtime at Cole Field House in College Park, Maryland, before winning the regional consolation game against St. John's 78–70 the next night.

Three of the five members of the All-Ivy League first team were Princeton players: Joe Heiser, Chris Thomforde and Gary Walters. This was the first time that one team had three first team selections. However, none of the three All-Ivy Princeton players were among the league's top five scorers. Nonetheless, Thomforde was a second team All-American selection by Converse. Walters was named first team U.P.I. "Small All-American;" "Honorable Mention All-America" by the A.P.; and was the winner of the B.F. Bunn Trophy, which is "awarded to that member of the varsity basketball team who through sportsmanship, play, and influence has contributed the most to the sport at Princeton." Following the season, Hummer was selected in the 1967 NBA draft by the Boston Celtics with the 64th overall selection in the 6th round.

== Regular season ==
The team posted a 25-3 (13-1 Ivy League) record.

LAFAYETTE	W	108-59
Army	W	67-63
Villanova	W	48-37
COLGATE	W	110-72
Davidson !	W	91-68
NAVY	W	85-57
Bowling Green @	W	87-73
Villanova @	W	55-52
Louisville @	L	63-72
North Carolina	W	91-81
BROWN	W	94-50
YALE	W	77-75
Harvard	W	90-46
Dartmouth	W	116-42
Pennsylvania	W	70-66
Rutgers	W	97-74
DARTMOUTH	W	30-16
HARVARD	W	66-59
Yale	W	81-80
Brown	W	57-54
Columbia	W	55-41
Cornell	L	56-62
COLUMBIA	W	97-45
CORNELL	W	81-66
PENNSYLVANIA	W	25-16
West Virginia #	W	68-57
North Carolina $	L	*70-78
St. John’s $	W	78-58

! = at Charlotte, N.C.
@ = Quaker City Tournament at Philadelphia
# = NCAA first round at Blacksburg, Va.
$ = NCAA East Regional at College Park, Md.

Home games in CAPS

== Rankings ==
Ranking movement Legend: ██ Increase in ranking. ██ Decrease in ranking.
Poll	Pre	Wk 1	Wk 2	Wk 3	Wk 4	Wk 5	Wk 6	Wk 7	Wk 8	Wk 9	Wk 10	Wk 11	Wk 12	Wk 13	Final
AP Top 10 Poll	-	-	-	-	-	-	7	5	5	5	4	3	6	5	6

== NCAA tournament ==
The team played in the 1967 NCAA Division I men's basketball tournament.

3/11/67 in Blacksburg, Va.: Princeton 68, West Virginia 57
3/17/67 in College Park, Md.: North Carolina 78, Princeton 70 (OT)
3/18/67 in College Park, Md.: Princeton 78, St. John’s 58

== Awards and honors ==
- Joe Heiser
  - First Team All-Ivy League
  - All-East
- Chris Thomforde
  - First Team All-Ivy League
- Gary Walters
  - First Team All-Ivy League
  - First Team U.P.I. "Small All-American"
  - Honorable Mention A.P. All-America
  - B.F. Bunn Trophy Winner "awarded to that member of the varsity basketball team who though sportsmanship, play, and influence has contributed the most to the sport at Princeton."
- John Haarlow
  - Second Team All-Ivy League
- Ed Hummer
  - Honorable Mention All-Ivy League

== Team players drafted into the NBA ==
Four players from this team were selected in the NBA draft.

Year	Round	Pick	Player	NBA club
1967	6	17	Ed Hummer	Boston Celtics
1968	6	4	Joe Heiser	Baltimore Bullets
1968	14	6	John Haarlow	New York Knicks
1969	7	11	Chris Thomforde	New York Knicks
