= 1966–67 Western Kentucky Hilltoppers basketball team =

American college basketball season

1966–67 Western Kentucky Hilltoppers basketball

Ohio Valley Conference Champion OVC Tournament Champion Hurricane Classic Champion

NCAA Tournament, First Round
- Conference: Ohio Valley Conference

Ranking
- Coaches: No. 7
- AP: No. 6
- Record: 23–3 (13–1 OVC)
- Head coach: John Oldham
- Assistant coach: Gene Rhodes
- Home arena: E. A. Diddle Arena

The 1966–67 Western Kentucky Hilltoppers men's basketball team represented Western Kentucky University during the 1966-67 NCAA University Division Basketball season. The Hilltoppers were led by coach John Oldham and consensus All-American player Clem Haskins. WKU won the Ohio Valley Conference tournament and season championship, as well as the conference's automatic bid to the 1967 NCAA University Division basketball tournament, where they lost to the eventual runner-up, Dayton, in overtime. The conference tournament was held in December and had no impact on the conference standing, the conference bid to the NCAA was awarded to the season champion. The Hilltoppers had the misfortune of having their star player, Haskins, break his wrist during the February 6th game against Murray State. He missed the next 5 games but returned to finish the season playing in a cast, which limited his effectiveness.

Haskins was OVC Player of the Year and was joined on the All-Conference team by Wayne Chapman, Dwight Smith, and Greg Smith; Haskins, Chapman, and Dwight Smith were also named to the OVC Tournament team. This team was one of the most talented in school history with several players being drafted by the NBA and ABA including Haskins, Dwight Smith, Greg Smith, Chapman, and Butch Kaufman.

== Schedule ==
Date time, TV	Rank^{#}	Opponent^{#}	Result	Record	Site city, state
Regular Season
12/1/1966*	No. 8	Vanderbilt	L 70–76	0–1	E. A. Diddle Arena; Bowling Green, KY
12/3/1966*	No. 8	at Memphis State	W 52–44	1–1	Mid-South Coliseum; Memphis, TN
12/10/1966*		Tampa	W 123–57	2–1	E. A. Diddle Arena; Bowling Green, KY
12/15/1966*		Pan American	W 78–64	3–1	E. A. Diddle Arena; Bowling Green, KY
12/17/1966*		at Butler	W 81–68	4–1	Hinkle Fieldhouse; Indianapolis, IN
12/19/1966		vs. Murray State; OVC Tournament	W 94–83	5–1	Convention Center; Louisville, KY
12/20/1966		vs. Morehead State; OVC Tournament Semifinal	W 80–77 ^{OT}	6–1	Convention Center; Louisville, KY
12/21/1966		vs. East Tennessee; OVC Tournament Final	W 72–59	7–1	Convention Center; Louisville, KY
12/27/1966*		vs. Holy Cross; Hurricane Classic	W 90–84	8–1	Miami Beach Convention Center; Miami Beach, FL
12/28/1966*		at Miami; Hurricane Classic	W 94–89	9–1	Miami Beach Convention Center; Miami Beach, FL
1/7/1967		at Tennessee Tech	W 91–80	10–1 (1-0)	Memorial Gymnasium; Cookeville, TN
1/9/1967		at East Tennessee	W 63–61	11–1 (2-0)	Brooks Gymnasium; Johnson City, TN
1/14/1967		Eastern Kentucky	W 116–71	12–1 (3-0)	E. A. Diddle Arena; Bowling Green, KY
1/16/1967		Morehead State	W 100–69	13–1 (4-0)	E. A. Diddle Arena; Bowling Green, KY
1/21/1967*		at La Salle	W 95–86	14–1	Palestra; Philadelphia, PA
1/30/1967	No. 8	at Austin Peay	W 101–59	15–1 (5-0)	Memorial Health Gymnasium; Clarksville, TN
2/4/1967	No. 8	at Middle Tennessee	W 95–62	16–1 (6-0)	Alumni Memorial Gym; Murfreesboro, TN
2/6/1967	No. 8	Murray State; Haskins injured	W 88–79 ^{OT}	17–1 (7-0)	E. A. Diddle Arena; Bowling Green, KY
2/11/1967	No. 6	East Tennessee	W 65–56	18–1 (8-0)	E. A. Diddle Arena; Bowling Green, KY
2/13/1967	No. 6	Tennessee Tech	W 80–71	19–1 (9-0)	E. A. Diddle Arena; Bowling Green, KY
2/18/1967	No. 5	at Morehead State	W 89–70	20–1 (10-0)	Wetherby Gymnasium; Morehead, KY
2/20/1967	No. 5	at Eastern Kentucky	W 71–62	21–1 (11-0)	Alumni Coliseum; Richmond, KY
2/25/1967	No. 3	at Murray State	L 69–75	21–2 (11-1)	Racer Arena; Murray, KY
2/27/1967	No. 3	Austin Peay; Haskins returns	W 116–76	22–2 (12-1)	E. A. Diddle Arena; Bowling Green, KY
3/4/1967	No. 6	Middle Tennessee	W 55–46	23–2 (13-1)	E. A. Diddle Arena; Bowling Green, KY
1967 NCAA University Division basketball tournament
3/11/1967*	No. 6	vs. Dayton; Mideast Region First Round	L 67–69 ^{OT}	23–3	Memorial Coliseum; Lexington, KY
*Non-conference game. ^{#}Rankings from AP Poll. (#) Tournament seedings in parentheses.
