= 1966–67 St. John's Redmen basketball team =

American college basketball season

1966–67 St. John's Redmen men's basketball

1967 NCAA Tournament, Sweet Sixteen
- Conference: Independent

Ranking
- Coaches: No. 12
- Record: 23–5
- Head coach: Lou Carnesecca
- Assistant coach: John Kresse
- Captain: Lloyd Dove
- Home arena: Alumni Hall; Madison Square Garden

1966–67 NCAA University Division men's basketball independents standings
	Conf.				Overall
Team	W		L	PCT	W		L	PCT
No. 9 Boston College		–		–	21	–	3	.875
No. 7 Houston		–		–	27	–	4	.871
St. John's		–		–	23	–	5	.821
Dayton		–		–	25	–	6	.806
No. 10 Texas Western		–		–	22	–	6	.786
St. Francis (PA)		–		–	20	–	6	.769
Syracuse		–		–	20	–	6	.769
Utah State		–		–	20	–	6	.769
Rutgers		–		–	22	–	7	.759
Providence		–		–	21	–	7	.750
VPI		–		–	20	–	7	.741
Marquette		–		–	21	–	9	.700
Seattle		–		–	18	–	8	.692
DePaul		–		–	17	–	8	.680
Georgia Tech		–		–	17	–	9	.654
Hardin–Simmons		–		–	17	–	9	.654
Memphis State		–		–	17	–	9	.654
Villanova		–		–	17	–	9	.654
Holy Cross		–		–	16	–	9	.640
Army		–		–	13	–	8	.619
Oklahoma City		–		–	16	–	10	.615
Loyola Chicago		–		–	13	–	9	.591
St. Bonaventure		–		–	13	–	9	.591
Canisius		–		–	14	–	10	.583
Tulane		–		–	14	–	10	.583
Miami (FL)		–		–	15	–	11	.577
New Mexico State		–		–	15	–	11	.577
Fairfield		–		–	12	–	9	.571
Colorado State		–		–	13	–	10	.565
Fordham		–		–	14	–	11	.560
Georgetown		–		–	12	–	11	.522
Notre Dame		–		–	14	–	14	.500
Xavier		–		–	13	–	13	.500
Loyola (LA)		–		–	11	–	11	.500
Creighton		–		–	12	–	13	.480
Niagara		–		–	12	–	13	.480
Navy		–		–	8	–	10	.444
Colgate		–		–	10	–	13	.435
Florida State		–		–	11	–	15	.423
Penn State		–		–	10	–	14	.417
Detroit		–		–	10	–	15	.400
Portland		–		–	10	–	16	.385
Butler		–		–	9	–	17	.346
Centenary		–		–	9	–	17	.346
Jacksonville		–		–	8	–	17	.320
Duquesne		–		–	7	–	15	.318
Air Force		–		–	6	–	18	.250
Pittsburgh		–		–	6	–	19	.240
Boston University		–		–	4	–	18	.182
West Texas State		–		–	1	–	18	.053
Rankings from AP Poll

The 1966–67 St. John's Redmen basketball team represented St. John's University during the 1966–67 NCAA Division I men's basketball season. The team was coached by Lou Carnesecca in his second year at the school. St. John's home games were played at Alumni Hall and Madison Square Garden.

== Roster ==
#	Name	Height	Position	Class	Hometown	Previous School(s)
4	Al Swartz	5'10"	G	SR	Uniondale, NY	Chaminade HS
5	Carmine Calzonetti	6'1"	G	SO	Audubon, NJ	Gloucester Catholic HS
10	Brian Hill	5'11"	G	SR	Ridgewood, NY	St. Francis Prep
11	Kit Frey	6'9"	F/C	JR	Barryville, NY	Eldred Central HS
12	Jack Brunner	6'4"	G/F	SR	Guttenberg, NJ	Memorial HS
14	Rudy Bogad	6'7"	F	JR	New York, NY	Archbishop Molloy HS
15	William Jones	6'4"	G	SR	Bronx, NY	Manhattan Prep
21	Richie Jackson	6'2"	G	SO	Lynbrook, NY	St. Agnes HS
24	Jack Bettridge	6'2"	G	JR	North Bergen, NJ	Power Memorial HS
30	John Warren	6'3"	G/F	SO	Far Rockaway, NY	Far Rockaway HS
44	Dan Cornelius	6'9"	F/C	SO	Wyandanch, NY	Wyandanch Memorial HS
55	Lloyd "Sonny" Dove	6'8"	F	SR	Brooklyn, NY	St. Francis Prep
	Mike Rowland	6'4"	G	JR	Ozone Park, NY	Bishop Loughlin HS
	James Plate	6'2"	G	SO	Patchogue, NY	Seton Hall HS

== Schedule and results ==
Date time, TV	Rank^{#}	Opponent^{#}	Result	Record	Site city, state
Regular Season
12/03/66*		Georgetown	W 70-62	1-0	Alumni Hall; Queens, NY
12/08/66*		at Holy Cross	W 77-60	2-0	Worcester Auditorium; Worcester, MA
12/14/66*		at Seton Hall	W 91-58	3-0	Walsh Gymnasium; South Orange, NJ
12/17/66*		Notre Dame	W 65-62	4-0	Alumni Hall; Queens, NY
12/19/66*		Kansas	W 68-44	5-0	Alumni Hall; Queens, NY
12/26/66*		vs. Northwestern; ECAC Holiday Festival	L 60-62	5-1	Madison Square Garden; New York, NY
12/28/66*	No. 8	vs. Duquesne; ECAC Holiday Festival	W 91-60	6-1	Madison Square Garden; New York, NY
12/30/66*	No. 8	vs. Brigham Young; ECAC Holiday Festival	W 76-73	7-1	Madison Square Garden; New York, NY
01/04/67*		at George Washington	W 74-58	8-1	Fort Myer Ceremonial Hall; Fort Myer, VA
01/07/67*		Rhode Island	W 57-55	9-1	Alumni Hall; Queens, NY
01/11/67*		at St. Joseph's	W 98-85	10-1	The Palestra; Philadelphia, PA
01/14/67*		St. Francis (NY)	W 95-71	11-1	Alumni Hall; Queens, NY
01/21/67*		Pittsburgh	W 95-66	12-1	Alumni Hall; Queens, NY
01/28/67*		at Canisius	L 73-75	12-2	Buffalo Auditorium; Buffalo, NY
02/01/67*		at Marquette	L 54-71	12-3	Milwaukee Arena; Milwaukee, WI
02/04/67*		Temple	W 65-63	13-3	Alumni Hall; Queens, NY
02/07/67*		at Villanova	W 59-52	14-3	Villanova Field House; Villanova, PA
02/09/67*		West Virginia	W 83-71	15-3	Alumni Hall; Queens, NY
02/11/67*		at Army	W 51-45	16-3	USMA Fieldhouse; West Point, NY
02/16/67*		Niagara	W 66-48	17-3	Alumni Hall; Queens, NY
02/18/67*		at Fordham	W 54-52	18-3	Rose Hill Gymnasium; Bronx, NY
02/21/67*		at No. 8 Syracuse	W 71-64	19-3	Manley Field House; Syracuse, NY
02/25/67*		Miami (FL)	W 97-70	20-3	Alumni Hall; Queens, NY
03/02/67*		vs. NYU	W 55-51	21-3	Madison Square Garden; New York, NY
03/04/67*		Massachusetts	W 76-64	22-3	Alumni Hall; Queens, NY
NCAA Tournament
03/11/67*		vs. Temple; NCAA regional quarterfinal	W 57-53	23-3	Cassell Coliseum; Blacksburg, VA
03/17/67*		vs. No. 9 Boston College; NCAA regional semifinal	L 62-63	23-4	Cole Field House; College Park, MD
03/18/67*		vs. No. 5 Princeton; NCAA regional third-place game	L 58-78	23-5	Cole Field House; College Park, MD
*Non-conference game. ^{#}Rankings from AP Poll. (#) Tournament seedings in parentheses.
