= 1966–67 NCAA University Division men's basketball rankings =

- Season: 1966–67
- NCAA Tournament: 1967
- Preseason No. 1: UCLA
- NCAA Tournament Champions: UCLA
NCAA University Division men's basketball rankings


The 1966–67 NCAA University Division men's basketball ranking was made up of two human polls, the AP Poll and the Coaches Poll.

== Legend ==
	Increase in ranking
	Decrease in ranking
	New to rankings from previous week
Italics	Number of first place votes
(#–#)	Win–loss record
т	Tied with team above or below also with this symbol

== AP Poll ==
	Preseason	Week 2 Dec. 6	Week 3 Dec. 13	Week 4 Dec. 20	Week 5 Dec. 27	Week 6 Jan. 3	Week 7 Jan. 10	Week 8 Jan. 17	Week 9 Jan. 24	Week 10 Jan. 31	Week 11 Feb. 7	Week 12 Feb. 14	Week 13 Feb. 21	Week 14 Feb. 28	Final Mar. 7	
1.	UCLA	UCLA (1–0)	UCLA (3–0)	UCLA (3–0)	UCLA (5–0)	UCLA (8–0)	UCLA (9–0)	UCLA (12–0)	UCLA (14–0)	UCLA (15–0)	UCLA (17–0)	UCLA (19–0)	UCLA (21–0)	UCLA (23–0)	UCLA (25–0)	1.
2.	UTEP	UTEP (2–0)	UTEP (5–0)	Louisville (6–0)	Louisville (8–0)	Louisville (11–0)	Louisville (13–0)	Louisville (14–1)	North Carolina (12–1)	North Carolina (13–1)	North Carolina (14–1)	Louisville (20–2)	Louisville (22–2)	Louisville (23–3)	Louisville (23–3)	2.
3.	Kentucky	Kentucky (1–0)	Louisville (3–0)	North Carolina (5–0)	North Carolina (7–0)	North Carolina (9–0)	New Mexico (11–1)	Houston (14–1)	Houston (14–1)	Louisville (16–2)	Louisville (18–2)	Princeton (19–1)	Western Kentucky (20–1)	North Carolina (20–3)	Kansas (20–3)	3.
4.	Duke	Louisville (1–0)	Kentucky (2–1)	UTEP (6–1)	UTEP (7–1)	New Mexico (9–1)	Houston (13–1)	North Carolina (12–1)	Louisville (15–2)	UTEP (14–2)	Princeton (17–1)	North Carolina (16–2)	Kansas (17–3)	Kansas (19–3)	North Carolina (21–4)	4.
5.	Louisville	Houston (2–0)	New Mexico (4–0)	Michigan State (4–0)	New Mexico (7–1)	Houston (11–1)	North Carolina (11–1)	Princeton (13–1)	Princeton (13–1)	Princeton (14–1)	Houston (15–2)	Western Kentucky (18–1)	North Carolina (18–3)	Princeton (22–2)	Princeton (23–2)	5.
6.	New Mexico	New Mexico (2–0)	North Carolina (3–0)	New Mexico (5–1)	Houston (9–1)	UTEP (8–2)	UTEP (10–2)	UTEP (11–2)	UTEP (12–2)	Houston (14–2)	Western Kentucky (16–1)	Kansas (15–3)	Princeton (20–2)	Western Kentucky (21–2)	Western Kentucky (23–2)	6.
7.	Houston	Duke (1–1)	BYU (3–0)	Cincinnati (5–0)	Cincinnati (7–0)	Providence (8–2)	Princeton (11–1)	Kansas (11–2)	Kansas (12–3)	Kansas (12–3)	Kansas (13–3)	Houston (16–3)	Houston (19–3)	Houston (21–3)	Houston (23–3)	7.
8.	Western Kentucky	North Carolina (2–0)	Michigan State (4–0)	Houston (8–1)	St. John's (5–0)	Cincinnati (8–1)	Kansas (10–2)	Florida (11–1)	Western Kentucky (14–1)	Western Kentucky (14–1)	UTEP (15–3)	UTEP (16–4)	Syracuse (19–2)	Tennessee (18–4)	Tennessee (20–5)	8.
9.	North Carolina	BYU	Houston (4–1)	Kansas (6–1)	Vanderbilt (8–1)	Kansas (9–2)	Providence (9–3)	New Mexico (11–3)	Vanderbilt (13–2)	Vanderbilt (14–2)	Providence (14–3)	Vanderbilt (17–3)	Tennessee (17–4)	UTEP (19–5)	Boston College (19–2)	9.
10.	Cincinnati	Cincinnati (2–0)	Cincinnati (3–0)	Vanderbilt (6–1)	Michigan State (5–1)	Bradley (9–2)	Florida (9–1)	Providence (11–3)	Providence (11–3)	Providence (13–3)	Boston College (12–1)	Syracuse (17–2)	UTEP (17–5)	Boston College (17–2)	UTEP (20–5)	10.
	Preseason	Week 2 Dec. 6	Week 3 Dec. 13	Week 4 Dec. 20	Week 5 Dec. 27	Week 6 Jan. 3	Week 7 Jan. 10	Week 8 Jan. 17	Week 9 Jan. 24	Week 10 Jan. 31	Week 11 Feb. 7	Week 12 Feb. 14	Week 13 Feb. 21	Week 14 Feb. 28	Final Mar. 7	
		Dropped: Western Kentucky (1–1)	Dropped: Duke (1–3)	Dropped: BYU (3–2); Kentucky (3–2)	Dropped: Kansas (6–2)	Dropped: Vanderbilt (8–2); Michigan State (5–3)	Dropped: Cincinnati (9–2); Bradley (9–4)	None	Dropped: Florida (11–3); New Mexico (11–5)	None	Dropped: Vanderbilt (15–3)	Dropped: Providence (15–4); Boston College (13–2)	Dropped: Vanderbilt (17–4)	Dropped: Syracuse (19–4)	None	

== UPI Poll ==
	Preseason	Week 2 Dec. 6	Week 3 Dec. 13	Week 4 Dec. 20	Week 5 Dec. 27	Week 6 Jan. 3	Week 7 Jan. 10	Week 8 Jan. 17	Week 9 Jan. 24	Week 10 Jan. 31	Week 11 Feb. 7	Week 12 Feb. 14	Week 13 Feb. 21	Week 14 Feb. 28	Final Mar. 7	
1.	UCLA	UCLA (1–0)	UCLA (3–0)	UCLA (3–0)	UCLA (5–0)	UCLA (8–0)	UCLA (9–0)	UCLA (12–0)	UCLA (14–0)	UCLA (15–0)	UCLA (17–0)	UCLA (19–0)	UCLA (21–0)	UCLA (23–0)	UCLA (25–0)	1.
2.	UTEP	UTEP (2–0)	UTEP (5–0)	North Carolina (5–0)	Louisville (8–0)	Louisville (11–0)	Louisville (13–0)	Louisville (14–1)	North Carolina (12–1)	North Carolina (13–1)	North Carolina (14–1)	Louisville (20–2)	Louisville (22–2)	Louisville (23–3)	Louisville (23–3)	2.
3.	Kentucky	Kentucky (1–0)	Michigan State (4–0)	Louisville (6–0)	North Carolina (7–0)	North Carolina (9–0)	North Carolina (11–1)	North Carolina (12–1)	Houston (14–1)	Louisville (16–2)	Louisville (18–2)	North Carolina (16–2)	North Carolina (18–3)	North Carolina (20–3)	North Carolina (21–4)	3.
4.	Duke	Michigan State (2–0)	Kentucky (2–1)	UTEP (6–1)	UTEP (7–1)	New Mexico (9–1)	New Mexico (11–1)	Houston (14–1)	Louisville (15–2)	UTEP (14–2)	Princeton (17–1)	Princeton (19–1)	Kansas (17–3)	Kansas (19–3)	Kansas (20–3)	4.
5.	Michigan State	Houston (2–0)	Louisville (3–0)	Michigan State (4–0)	New Mexico (7–1)	Cincinnati (8–1)	Houston (13–1)	UTEP (11–2)	UTEP (12–2)	Houston (14–2)	Houston (15–2)	Kansas (15–3)	Western Kentucky (20–1)	Princeton (22–2)	Princeton (23–2)	5.
6.	Houston	Louisville (1–0)	BYU (3–0)	New Mexico (5–1)	Cincinnati (7–0)	Houston (11–1)	UTEP (10–2)	Kansas (11–2)	Princeton (13–1)	Princeton (14–1)	UTEP (15–3)	Western Kentucky (18–1)	Princeton (20–2)	Houston (21–3)	Houston (23–3)	6.
7.	Louisville	New Mexico (2–0)	New Mexico (4–0)	Cincinnati (5–0)	Michigan State (5–1)	UTEP (8–2)	Kansas (10–2)	Princeton (13–1)	Kansas (12–3)	Kansas (12–3)	Kansas (13–3)	UTEP (16–4)	Houston (19–3)	Western Kentucky (21–2)	Western Kentucky (23–2)	7.
8.	BYU	BYU (1–0)	North Carolina (3–0)	Houston (8–1)	Houston (9–1)	Providence (8–2)	Cincinnati (9–2)	New Mexico (11–3)	Cincinnati (12–3)	Vanderbilt (14–2)	Western Kentucky (16–1)	Houston (16–3)	Tennessee (17–4)	Tennessee (18–4)	UTEP (20–5)	8.
9.	Western Kentucky	North Carolina (2–0)	Kansas (5–0)	Kansas (6–1)	Vanderbilt (8–1)	Kansas (9–2)	Princeton (11–1)	Florida (11–1)	Western Kentucky (14–1)	Western Kentucky (14–1)	Providence (14–3)	Vanderbilt (17–3)	UTEP (17–5)	UTEP (19–5)	Tennessee (20–5)	9.
10.	Providence	Virginia Tech (2–0)	Cincinnati (3–0)	Boston College (6–0)	Boston College (8–0)	Vanderbilt (8–2)	Vanderbilt (10–2)	Vanderbilt (12–2)	Vanderbilt (13–2)	Providence (13–3)	Vanderbilt (15–3)	Utah State (17–3)	Boston College (15–2)	Boston College (17–2)	Boston College (19–2)	10.
11.	Nebraska	Duke (1–1)	Vanderbilt (4–0)	Vanderbilt (6–1)	St. John's (5–0)	Western Kentucky (9–1)	Providence (9–3)	Boston College (12–1)	Providence (11–3)	Cincinnati (11–6)	Boston College (12–1)	Boston College (13–2)	Syracuse (19–2)	Vanderbilt (19–4)	Toledo (23–1)	11.
12.	Boston College	Cincinnati (2–0) т	Boston College (4–0)	BYU (3–2)	Kansas (6–2)	Boston College (9–1)	Western Kentucky (10–1)	Providence (11–3)	St. John's (12–1)	Boston College (12–1)	Syracuse (15–2)	Syracuse (17–2)	Utah State (18–3)	St. John's (20–3)	St. John's (22–3)	12.
13.	Dayton т	Nebraska (1–0) т	Houston (4–1)	Illinois (2–1)	Tennessee (4–0)	Bradley (9–2)	Boston College (10–1)	Western Kentucky (12–1)	Boston College (12–1)	Tennessee (11–3)	Toledo (14–1)	Tennessee (15–4)	Vanderbilt (17–4)	Providence (18–6)	Tulsa (19–7)	13.
14.	Kansas т	Kansas (2–0)	Illinois (2–1)	St. John's (4–0)	West Virginia (5–0)	St. John's (7–1)	Florida (9–1)	St. John's (11–1)	Utah State (11–3)	Tulsa (13–3)	Duke (10–5) т	Duke (12–5)	Providence (16–5)	Duke (13–6)	Utah State (20–5) т	14.
15.	North Carolina	Providence (1–0)	West Virginia (4–0)	Tennessee (4–0)	Princeton (6–0)	Michigan State (5–3)	Dayton (11–1) т	Dayton (12–2)	New Mexico (11–5) т	Toledo (13–0)	Utah State (14–3) т	Providence (15–4)	Duke (13–6)	Toledo (21–1)	Vanderbilt (20–5) т	15.
16.	New Mexico т	Boston College (2–0)	Loyola-Chicago (3–0)	Florida (4–0)	Seattle (7–1)	Seattle (9–1)	Seattle (10–2) т	Tennessee (7–3) т	Tennessee (9–3) т	St. John's (12–2) т	Tennessee (13–4)	Toledo (16–1)	Toledo (18–1)	Tulsa (18–6)	Pacific (21–3)	16.
17.	Loyola-Chicago т	Loyola-Chicago (1–0)	Virginia Tech (2–1)	West Virginia (5–0)	Western Kentucky (7–1)	Utah State (7–2)	Mississippi State (9–1) т	Toledo (9–0) т	Mississippi State (11–1)	Syracuse (12–2) т	Cincinnati (12–7)	Florida (17–4)	St. John's (18–3)	Dayton (21–4)	Providence (20–6)	17.
18.	Cincinnati	Vanderbilt (2–0)	Providence (3–0) т	Bradley (5–1)	Kentucky (4–3) т	Dayton (10–1) т	St. John's (10–2) т	Syracuse (11–2) т	BYU (10–5)	Utah (11–6)	Northwestern (9–5)	Cincinnati (12–9)	BYU (12–7)	Florida (20–4)	New Mexico (18–7)	18.
19.	Colorado State	Colorado State (2–0)	St. John's (2–0) т	Colorado (5–1) т	Virginia Tech (4–1) т	Princeton (8–1) т	Tennessee (6–2) т	Mississippi State (11–1)	Florida (11–3) т	New Mexico (11–5)	Tulsa (14–4)	St. John's (16–3)	Florida (18–4)	Syracuse (19–4)	Duke (13–7)	19.
20.	St. John's	Dayton (2–0)	Seattle (3–0)	Western Kentucky (4–1) т	Colorado State (4–3) т Mississippi State (7–0) т	Florida (7–1)	Iowa (8–2) т SMU (8–3) т	Utah State (10–3) т Tulsa (11–3) т	Northwestern (7–4) т	Duke (8–5)	St. John's (13–3)	Tulsa (15–5)	Virginia Tech (16–4)	Utah State (18–5)	Florida (21–4)	20.
	Preseason	Week 2 Dec. 6	Week 3 Dec. 13	Week 4 Dec. 20	Week 5 Dec. 27	Week 6 Jan. 3	Week 7 Jan. 10	Week 8 Jan. 17	Week 9 Jan. 24	Week 10 Jan. 31	Week 11 Feb. 7	Week 12 Feb. 14	Week 13 Feb. 21	Week 14 Feb. 28	Final Mar. 7	
		Dropped: Western Kentucky (1–1); St. John's (1–0)	Dropped: Duke (1–3); Nebraska; Colorado State; Dayton	Dropped: Kentucky (3–2); Loyola-Chicago; Virginia Tech; Providence; Seattle	Dropped: BYU; Illinois; Florida; Bradley; Colorado	Dropped: Tennessee; West Virginia; Kentucky; Virginia Tech; Colorado State; Mississippi State	Dropped: Bradley (9–4); Michigan State; Utah State	Dropped: Cincinnati; Seattle; Iowa; SMU	Dropped: Dayton; Toledo; Syracuse; Tulsa	Dropped: Utah State; Mississippi State; BYU; Florida; Northwestern	Dropped: Utah; New Mexico	Dropped: Northwestern	Dropped: Cincinnati; Tulsa (16–6)	Dropped: BYU; Virginia Tech	Dropped: Dayton (21–5); Syracuse (19–5)	
