= 1967 NCAA University Division basketball tournament =

Edition of USA college basketball tournament

- Season: 1966–67
- Teams: 23
- Finals site: Freedom Hall, Louisville, Kentucky
- Champions: UCLA Bruins (3rd title, 3rd title game, 4th Final Four)
- Runner-up: Dayton Flyers (1st title game, 1st Final Four)
- Semifinalists: Houston Cougars (1st Final Four); North Carolina Tar Heels (3rd Final Four)
- Winning coach: John Wooden (3rd title)
- MOP: Lew Alcindor (UCLA)
- Attendance: 159,570
- Top scorer: Elvin Hayes (Houston) (128 points)

The 1967 NCAA University Division basketball tournament involved 23 schools playing in single-elimination play to determine the national champion of men's NCAA Division I college basketball. The 29th annual edition of the tournament began on Saturday, March 11, and ended two weeks later with the championship game on March 25, at Freedom Hall in Louisville, Kentucky. A total of 27 games were played, including a third-place game in each region and a national third-place game.

UCLA, coached by John Wooden, won the national title with a 79–64 victory in the final game over Dayton, coached by Don Donoher. Sophomore center Lew Alcindor (later named Kareem Abdul-Jabbar) of UCLA was named the tournament's Most Outstanding Player. This was the first of seven consecutive NCAA titles for UCLA and the first of three consecutive Most Outstanding Player awards for Alcindor.

== Locations ==
Round	Region	Site	Venue	Host
First Round	East	Blacksburg, Virginia	Cassell Coliseum	Virginia Tech
First Round	East	Kingston, Rhode Island	Keaney Gymnasium	URI
First Round	Mideast	Lexington, Kentucky	Memorial Coliseum	Kentucky
First Round	Midwest & West	Fort Collins, Colorado	Colorado State Auditorium-Gymnasium	Colorado State
Regionals	East	College Park, Maryland	Cole Field House	Maryland
Regionals	Mideast	Evanston, Illinois	McGaw Memorial Hall	Northwestern
Regionals	Midwest	Lawrence, Kansas	Allen Fieldhouse	Kansas
Regionals	West	Corvallis, Oregon	Gill Coliseum	Oregon State
Final Four		Louisville, Kentucky	Freedom Hall	Louisville

== Teams ==
Region	Team	Coach	Conference	Finished	Final Opponent	Score
East
East	Boston College	Bob Cousy	Independent	Regional Runner-up	North Carolina	L 96–80
East	Connecticut	Fred Shabel	Yankee	First round	Boston College	L 48–42
East	North Carolina	Dean Smith	Atlantic Coast	Fourth Place	Houston	L 84–62
East	Princeton	Butch van Breda Kolff	Ivy League	Regional third place	St. John's	W 78–58
East	St. John's	Lou Carnesecca	Independent	Regional Fourth Place	Princeton	L 78–58
East	Temple	Harry Litwack	Middle Atlantic	First round	St. John's	L 57–53
East	West Virginia	Bucky Waters	Southern	First round	Princeton	L 68–57
Mideast
Mideast	Dayton	Don Donoher	Independent	Runner Up	UCLA	L 79–64
Mideast	Indiana	Lou Watson	Big Ten	Regional third place	Tennessee	W 51–44
Mideast	Tennessee	Ray Mears	Southeastern	Regional Fourth Place	Indiana	L 51–44
Mideast	Toledo	Bob Nichols	Mid-American	First round	Virginia Tech	L 82–76
Mideast	Virginia Tech	Howie Shannon	Independent	Regional Runner-up	Dayton	L 71–66
Mideast	Western Kentucky	Johnny Oldham	Ohio Valley	First round	Dayton	L 69–67
Midwest
Midwest	Houston	Guy Lewis	Independent	Third Place	North Carolina	W 84–62
Midwest	Kansas	Ted Owens	Big Eight	Regional third place	Louisville	W 70–68
Midwest	Louisville	Peck Hickman	Missouri Valley	Regional Fourth Place	Kansas	L 70–68
Midwest	New Mexico State	Lou Henson	Independent	First round	Houston	L 59–58
Midwest	SMU	Doc Hayes	Southwest	Regional Runner-up	Houston	L 83–75
West
West	Pacific	Dick Edwards	West Coast Athletic	Regional Runner-up	UCLA	L 80–64
West	Seattle	Lionel Purcell	Independent	First round	Texas Western	L 62–54
West	Texas Western	Don Haskins	Independent	Regional third place	Wyoming	W 69–67
West	UCLA	John Wooden	AAWU	Champion	Dayton	W 79–64
West	Wyoming	Bill Strannigan	Western Athletic	Regional Fourth Place	Texas Western	L 69–67

== Bracket ==
* – Denotes overtime period

=== East region ===
Quarterfinals
Princeton	68
West Virginia	57
St. John's	57
Temple	53
Boston College	48
Connecticut	42

Semifinals
North Carolina	78
Princeton	70*
St. John's	62
Boston College	63

Finals
North Carolina	96
Boston College	80

=== Mideast region ===
Quarterfinals
Dayton	69
Western Kentucky	67*
Virginia Tech	82
Toledo	76

Semifinals
Tennessee	52
Dayton	53
Indiana	70
Virginia Tech	79

Finals
Dayton	71
Virginia Tech	66

=== Midwest region ===
Quarterfinals
Houston	59
New Mexico State	58

Semifinals
SMU	83
Louisville	81
Kansas	53
Houston	66

Finals
SMU	75
Houston	83

=== West region ===
Quarterfinals
Texas Western	62
Seattle	54

Semifinals
UCLA	109
Wyoming	60
Pacific	72
Texas Western	63

Finals
UCLA	80
Pacific	64

=== Final Four ===
National Semifinals; Friday, March 24
E	North Carolina	62
ME	Dayton	76
MW	Houston	58
W	UCLA	73

Championship Game; Saturday, March 25
ME	Dayton	64
W	UCLA	79
Third Place Game
MW	Houston	84
E	North Carolina	62

=== Regional third place games ===
East Regional third place
Princeton	68
St. John's	57

Mideast Regional third place
Indiana	51
Tennessee	44

Midwest Regional third place
Kansas	70
Louisville	68

West Regional third place
Texas Western	69
Wyoming	67

== See also ==
- 1967 NCAA College Division basketball tournament
- 1967 National Invitation Tournament
- 1967 NAIA basketball tournament
