= Jimmy Dawson (basketball, born 1945) =

American basketball player

Personal information
- Born: April 18, 1945 (age 81) Oak Park, Illinois, U.S.
- Listed height: 6 ft 0 in (1.83 m)
- Listed weight: 175 lb (79 kg)

Career information
- High school: York Community (Elmhurst, Illinois)
- College: Illinois (1963–1967)
- NBA draft: 1967: 16th round, 154th overall pick
- Drafted by: Chicago Bulls
- Playing career: 1967–1968
- Position: Point guard
- Number: 12

Career history
- 1967–1968: Indiana Pacers

Career highlights
- Chicago Tribune Silver Basketball (1967)
- Stats at Basketball Reference

James C. Dawson (born April 18, 1945) is an American former professional basketball point guard who played one season in the American Basketball Association (ABA) as a member of the Indiana Pacers during the 1967–68 season. He attended University of Illinois at Urbana–Champaign where he was drafted by the Chicago Bulls during the 16^{th} round of the 1967 NBA draft, but he did not play for them.

== High school ==
A native of Oak Park, Illinois, Dawson attended York Community High School from 1959–60 to 1962–63 and led the Dukes to the "Elite 8" of the Illinois High School Association state basketball tournament, losing to Jim Burns and the McLeansboro Foxes in the IHSA quarterfinals of the 1962 tournament. In his two state tournament games, Dawson scored 36 points, 18 in the victory versus Harvey (Thornton) and an additional 18 in the loss to McLeansboro. Dawson led York to consecutive regional championships in 1962 and 1963.

As a junior Dawson's team would finish the season with an overall record of 25 wins and four losses, and finished in second place in the West Suburban Conference behind Lyons Township High School. As a senior, in 1963, Dawson's team would win the conference as well as win the IHSA regional, with an overall record of 19 wins and seven losses.

== College career ==
Dawson chose to play college basketball at the University of Illinois at Urbana–Champaign and was a member of the freshman basketball team for the 1963–64 season. He played in 70 of the team's 72 games during his three-years on the varsity team and was the starting point guard for all three, replacing Jim Vopicka. As a sophomore during the 1964–65 season, Dawson joined All-American seniors, Tal Brody and future Illini All-Century team member, Skip Thoren, on an Illini team that finished the season with an 18 and 6 record and a third-place finish in the Big Ten with a 10 and four record, losing twice to top-ranked Michigan. During the season the team would win the Kentucky Invitational Tournament and finish the year with a Coaches ranking of number 16.

The loss of 999 offensive points occurred with the graduation of Brody and Thoren, leaving Dawson's junior season of 1965–66, needing to find a new identity. The Fighting Illini would struggle all season, losing games by less than three points to Princeton, Providence, Northwestern, Indiana, Michigan State and Minnesota, leaving the team with an overall record of 12 wins and 12 losses and a conference record of 8 wins and 6 losses, placing them tied for third in the conference. This season marked only the second time in Harry Combes tenure that the Illini finished with a .500 record. For Dawson, his best asset was delivering the ball to Donnie Freeman, who would set the all-time single season scoring record of 668 points during the course of the year. After the season, Dawson was named as captain for the following year.

A dark cloud loomed over Dawson's 1966–67 senior season as an investigation revolving around a "slush-fund" program which provided funds to athletes within the basketball and football programs had come to a conclusion. The investigation found that many integral parts of the administration, coaching staff, as well as athletes, were culpable and should be punished. The basketball team was the first to feel the brunt of sanctions caused by the "slush fund". For the first few weeks of the season, the team was proving to be one of the elite teams in college basketball. They had defeated Kentucky 98–97 at Memorial Coliseum in early December, a feat the Illini had done only one other time in their history. Prior to the revelations, the team's only loss against West Virginia in Morgantown. Then, just two days before Christmas, while the team awaited its Chicago Stadium game with California, three fifths of the starting lineup were declared ineligible.

Rich Jones, Ron Dunlap and Steve Kuberski never again played for Illinois, and Harry Combes was forced to resign at the end of the season as well as his assistant Howie Braun. Dawson was the only remaining starter and took over the scoring load from that point on, but the real surprise for the remainder of the season was Dave Scholz. Dawson and Scholz combined for 992 points by the season's end and the team would finish in eighth place in the Big Ten with a 6–8 record and a 12–12 record overall. After the season, Dawson would be named an Academic All-American, Most Valuable Player of the team as well as the Big Ten and was awarded the Chicago Tribune's Silver Basketball.

== Professional career ==
Dawson played one season (1967–1968) in the American Basketball Association (ABA), as a member of the Indiana Pacers. He averaged 5.6 points per game and 1.0 rebounds per game and 1.5 assists per game, in his 21 game career.

== Honors ==
- 1966 – Honorable Mention All-Big Ten
- 1967 – Team Captain
- 1967 – Team MVP
- 1967 – 1st Team All-Big Ten
- 1967 – Earned the Chicago Tribune's Silver Basketball award
- 1967 – Honorable Mention Academic All-American
- 1967 – Honorable Mention All American
- 1967 – University of Illinois Athlete of the Year
- 1974 – Inducted into the Illinois Basketball Coaches Association's Hall of Fame as a player.
- 2008 – Honored jersey which hangs in the State Farm Center to show regard for being the most decorated basketball players in the University of Illinois' history.

== Statistics ==
=== College ===
Season	Games	Points	PPG	Field Goals	Attempts	Avg	Free Throws	Attempts	Avg	Rebounds	Avg	Big Ten Record	Overall Record
1964–65	22	87	4.0	38	93	.409	11	18	.611	41	1.9	10–4	18–6
1965–66	24	368	15.3	163	344	.474	42	59	.712	100	4.2	8–6	12–12
1966–67	24	512	21.7	214	495	.432	93	122	.762	73	3.0	6–8	12–12
**Totals**	**70**	**976**	**13.9**	**415**	**932**	**.445**	**146**	**199**	**.734**	**214**	**3.1**	**24–18**	**42–30**

=== ABA career statistics ===
Legend
GP	Games played	MPG	Minutes per game
FG%	Field-goal percentage	FT%	Free-throw percentage
RPG	Rebounds per game	APG	Assists per game
PPG	Points per game	**Bold**	Career high

==== Regular season ====
Year	Team	GP	MPG	FG%	FT%	RPG	APG	PPG
1967–68	Indiana	22	13.7	.350	**.581**	1.0	1.5	5.6
