= 1966–67 Illinois Fighting Illini men's basketball team =

American college basketball season

1966–67 Illinois Fighting Illini men's basketball
- Conference: Big Ten Conference
- Record: 12–12 (6–8 Big Ten)
- Head coach: Harry Combes (20th season)
- Assistant coaches: Howie Braun (30th season); Jim Wright (9th season)
- MVP: Jim Dawson
- Captain: Jim Dawson
- Home arena: Assembly Hall

1966–67 Big Ten Conference men's basketball standings
	Conf.				Overall
Team	W		L	PCT	W		L	PCT
Michigan State	10	–	4	.714	16	–	7	.696
Indiana	10	–	4	.714	18	–	8	.692
Iowa	9	–	5	.643	16	–	8	.667
Wisconsin	8	–	6	.571	15	–	9	.625
Purdue	7	–	7	.500	15	–	9	.625
Northwestern	7	–	7	.500	11	–	11	.500
Ohio State	6	–	8	.429	13	–	11	.542
Illinois	6	–	8	.429	12	–	12	.500
Minnesota	5	–	9	.357	9	–	15	.375
Michigan	2	–	12	.143	8	–	16	.333
Rankings from AP Poll

The 1966–67 Illinois Fighting Illini men's basketball team represented the University of Illinois.

== Regular season ==
A dark cloud loomed over the Fighting Illini's men's basketball team as the 1966-67 season commenced. An investigation revolving around a "slush-fund" program which provided funds to athletes within the basketball and football programs had come to the conclusion that many integral parts of the administration, coaching staff, as well as athletes, were culpable and should be punished. The basketball team was the first to feel the brunt of sanctions caused by the "slush fund". For the first few weeks of the season, the 1966-67 Illini team was proving to be one of the elite teams in college basketball. They had defeated Kentucky 98-97 at Kentucky in early December, a feat the Illini had done only one other time in their history. Prior to the revelations, the team's only loss was by 2 points at the hands of West Virginia on their home court in Morgantown. Then, just two days before Christmas, while the team awaited its Chicago Stadium game with California, three fifths of the starting lineup were declared ineligible.

Rich Jones, Ron Dunlap and Steve Kuberski never again played for Illinois, and Harry Combes and his assistant Howie Braun was forced to resign at the end of the season. The team that remained bonded together and defeated Cal, 97–87. Remaining starter Jim Dawson took over the scoring load from that point on, but the real surprise that night, and for the remainder of the season, was Dave Scholz.

Scholz, a 6-foot-7 sophomore from Decatur, had seen only limited action in the first five games of the season. From the Cal game and beyond, Scholz utilized his opportunity to play by becoming the second leading scorer on this team and the leading scorer the following two seasons. Not only did he become the leading scorer, he was also named a Helms Foundation first-team All-American each of his remaining years. The dismissal of the three starters also gave impetus to a Big 10 MVP award for Dawson.

Eventually, reality set in, and the Illini finished with a 12–12 record and a seventh-place finish in the Big 10. Based on the negative findings, Illinois was forced to hire a new athletic director and new head basketball coach. Gene Vance was hired to be athletic director and was asked to guide the Illini back to respectability.

The university began the investigation into the "slush-fund" as a good faith gesture to demonstrate to the Big Ten commissioners that they were willing to handle any negative consequences in-house. University President David D. Henry found that 12 active football and basketball players had received illegal aid, seven football, 5 basketball. It also found that 17 other athletes had received aid since 1962, totaling approximately $21,500. The salt in the wound came from Big Ten commissioner Bill Reed, who emphasized that, even though the university had completed its investigation and dismissed the parties involved, the conference would continue the investigation further and hand down a formal decision on March 4, 1967. The decision, after a fairly brief debate, made by the conference athletic directors, including ex-offenders Biggie Munn and Forest Evashevski, called for Illinois to fire Elliott, Combes and Braun or "show cause" why the university should not be suspended or dropped from Big Ten membership. Based on the fact that the committee making the decision was made up of several members who had been guilty of infractions themselves, President Henry became outraged. The university appealed the decision while "friends of the coaches" began circulating petitions with hopes of pressuring the school into keeping them regardless of the consequences. On March 18, the Big Ten issued its ultimatum to the University of Illinois. In a statement from the commissioner, it was demanded that the implicated coaches be fired or the school could face an indefinite suspension. When the dust settled, football coach Pete Elliott and basketball coaches Combes and Braun all had their existing contracts terminated on August 31, 1967.

Combes finished his 20-year career with 316 wins, three conference titles (1949, 1951, and 1952) and his 1963 team sharing a portion of the Big Ten Championship with Ohio State. Along with the conference championships, Combes' teams finished the NCAA Tournament in third place three times and in the Elite Eight once during his tenure.

The 1966-67 team's starting lineup included Deon Flessner and Benny Louis at the forward spots, Dawson and Preston Pearson as guards and Scholz at center.

=== Roster ===
1966–67 Illinois Fighting Illini men's basketball team
Players
Coaches

Pos.	#	Name	Height	Weight	Year	Previous school	Hometown
F	10	John Prescott	6 ft 6 in (1.98 m)	185 lb (84 kg)	Jr	Lake Forest High School	Lake Forest, Illinois
G	11	Benny Louis	6 ft 2 in (1.88 m)	175 lb (79 kg)	Jr	Pinckneyville Community High School	Pinckneyville, Illinois
F/C	12	Paul Nitz	6 ft 6 in (1.98 m)	195 lb (88 kg)	So	Marian Central Catholic High School	Woodstock, Illinois
G/F	14	Jerry Mettille	6 ft 4 in (1.93 m)	190 lb (86 kg)	Sr	Morris Community High School	Morris, Illinois
F	21	Bob Johansen	6 ft 4 in (1.93 m)	190 lb (86 kg)	Sr	Geneva High School	Geneva, Illinois
G	24	Jim Dawson (C)	6 ft 0 in (1.83 m)	175 lb (79 kg)	Sr	York High School	Elmhurst, Illinois
G	25	Preston Pearson	6 ft 1 in (1.85 m)	195 lb (88 kg)	Sr	Freeport High School	Freeport, Illinois
F	30	Deon Flessner	6 ft 4 in (1.93 m)	205 lb (93 kg)	Sr	Fithian High School	Fithian, Illinois
F	32	Les Busboom	6 ft 4 in (1.93 m)	185 lb (84 kg)	So	St. Joseph-Ogden High School	Royal, Illinois
F/C	33	Rich Jones (S)	6 ft 7 in (2.01 m)	200 lb (91 kg)	Jr	Lester High School	Memphis, Tennessee
G/F	34	Denny Pace	6 ft 3 in (1.91 m)	175 lb (79 kg)	So	Collinsville High School	Collinsville, Illinois
C	35	Ron Dunlap (S)	6 ft 8 in (2.03 m)	220 lb (100 kg)	Jr	Farragut Academy	Chicago, Illinois
F/C	40	Dave Scholz	6 ft 8 in (2.03 m)	220 lb (100 kg)	So	Stephen Decatur High School	Decatur, Illinois
F/C	43	Steve Kuberski (S)	6 ft 7 in (2.01 m)	210 lb (95 kg)	So	Moline High School	Moline, Illinois
G	45	Bill Stefan	6 ft 4 in (1.93 m)	185 lb (84 kg)	So	St. Joseph High School	Westchester, Illinois

Head coach

- Harry Combes (University of Illinois) (20th year)

Assistant coach(es)

- Howie Braun (University of Illinois) (30th year)
- Jim Wright (University of Illinois) (9th year)

Legend

- (C) Team captain
- (S) Suspended
- (I) Ineligible
- (W) Walk-on
- Injured
- Current redshirt

Roster

== Schedule ==
Date time, TV	Rank^{#}	Opponent^{#}	Result	Record	Site (attendance) city, state
Non-Conference regular season
12/3/1966*		Butler	W 82-51	1-0	Assembly Hall (7,822); Champaign, IL
12/5/1966*		at No. 3 Kentucky	W 98-97 ^{ot}	2-0	Rupp Arena (11,500); Lexington, KY
12/10/1966*		at West Virginia	L 88-90	2-1	WVU Field House (6,500); Morgantown, WV
12/19/1966		Wisconsin	W 87-74	3-1 (1-0)	Assembly Hall (8,525); Champaign, IL
12/22/1966*		Stanford	W 81-67	4-1	Assembly Hall (7,435); Champaign, IL
12/23/1966*		vs. California	L 72-89	5-1	Chicago Stadium (8,000); Chicago, IL
12/27/1966*		vs. Arizona; Los Angeles Basketball Classic	W 93-77	6-1	Los Angeles Memorial Sports Arena (3,473); Los Angeles, CA
12/29/1966*		vs. Southern California; Los Angeles Basketball Classic	L 72-73	6-2	Los Angeles Memorial Sports Arena (12,100); Los Angeles, CA
12/30/1966*		vs. Georgia Tech; Los Angeles Basketball Classic	W 83-71	7-2	Los Angeles Memorial Sports Arena (12,130); Los Angeles, CA
Big Ten regular season
1/7/1967		Michigan State	L 74-76	7-3 (1-1)	Assembly Hall (11,047); Champaign, IL
1/10/1967		at Northwestern; Rivalry	L 96-104	7-4 (1-2)	McGaw Memorial Hall (7,748); Evanston, IL
1/14/1967		Michigan	W 99-93	8-4 (2-2)	Assembly Hall (7,141); Champaign, IL
2/4/1967*		vs. Notre Dame	L 75-90	8-5	Chicago Stadium (17,024); Chicago, IL
1/29/1967*		vs. No. 1 UCLA	L 82-120	8-6	Chicago Stadium (10,025); Chicago, IL
2/4/1967		Northwestern; Rivalry	W 93-83	9-6 (3-2)	Assembly Hall (8,145); Champaign, IL
2/7/1967		at Iowa; Rivalry	L 89-96	9-7 (3-3)	Iowa Field House (12,822); Iowa City, IA
2/11/1967		at Minnesota	L 81-93	9-8 (3-4)	Williams Arena (8,317); Minneapolis, MN
2/18/1967		Purdue	W 94-92	10-8 (4-4)	Assembly Hall (7,244); Champaign, IL
2/20/1967		at Indiana; Rivalry	L 81-96	10-9 (4-5)	New Fieldhouse (8,035); Bloomington, IN
2/3/1967		at Purdue	L 86-98	10-10 (4-6)	Mackey Arena (8,035); West Lafayette, IN
2/27/1967		Minnesota	W 84-71	11-10 (5-6)	Assembly Hall (5,562); Champaign, IL
3/4/1967		Ohio State	W 80-70	12-10 (6-6)	Assembly Hall (10,733); Champaign, IL
3/6/1967		at Ohio State	L 79-100	12-11 (6-7)	St. John Arena (5,898); Columbus, OH
3/11/1967		at Wisconsin	L 92-102	12-12 (6-8)	Wisconsin Field House (11,722); Madison, WI
*Non-conference game. ^{#}Rankings from AP Poll. (#) Tournament seedings in parentheses. All times are in Central Time.

== Player stats ==
Player	Games played	Field goals	Free throws	Rebounds	Points
Jim Dawson	24	214	93	73	521
Dave Scholz	23	194	83	250	471
Deon Flessner	20	85	73	162	243
Preston Pearson	23	75	49	123	199
Bob Johansen	22	58	42	72	158
Rich Jones*	5	52	18	66	122
Denny Pace	22	29	28	54	86
Benny Louis	23	32	38	59	86
Les Busboom	18	26	21	60	77
Ron Dunlap*	5	26	21	60	73
Steve Kuberski*	5	7	2	12	16
Paul Nitz	6	2	3	4	7
Jerry Mettille	9	2	3	5	7

*Jones, Dunlap and Kuberski were deemed ineligible on December 23rd due to the "Slush-Fund" scandal.

== Awards and honors ==
- Jim Dawson
  - Team Most Valuable Player
  - Big Ten Player of the Year
  - Honorable Mention All-American (Converse)
- Dave Scholz
  - Honorable Mention All-American (Converse)

== Team players drafted into the NBA ==
Player	NBA club	Round	Pick
Jim Dawson	Chicago Bulls	16	2
