= 1956–57 Illinois Fighting Illini men's basketball team =

American college basketball season

1956–57 Illinois Fighting Illini men's basketball
- Conference: Big Ten Conference
- Record: 14–8 (7-7 Big Ten)
- Head coach: Harry Combes (10th season)
- Assistant coaches: Howie Braun (20th season); Jim Bredar (1st season); Jess MacLeay (1st season)
- MVP: Harv Schmidt
- Captain: Harv Schmidt
- Home arena: Huff Hall

1956–57 Big Ten Conference men's basketball standings
	Conf.				Overall
Team	W		L	PCT	W		L	PCT
Indiana	10	–	4	.714	14	–	8	.636
No. 11 Michigan State	10	–	4	.714	16	–	10	.615
Minnesota	9	–	5	.643	14	–	8	.636
Ohio State	9	–	5	.643	14	–	8	.636
Purdue	8	–	6	.571	15	–	7	.682
Michigan	8	–	6	.571	13	–	9	.591
Illinois	7	–	7	.500	14	–	8	.636
Iowa	4	–	10	.286	8	–	14	.364
Wisconsin	3	–	11	.214	5	–	17	.227
Northwestern	2	–	12	.143	6	–	16	.273
Rankings from AP Poll

The 1956–57 Illinois Fighting Illini men’s basketball team represented the University of Illiniois.

== Regular season ==
Harry Combes celebrated 10 years as the head coach of the University of Illinois' Fighting Illini basketball team. During his ten years as coach, Combes had established the Illini as a national powerhouse with sportswriters taking note. For example, the Associated Press began its basketball poll in 1949 with United Press International adding its poll in 1951 and from 1951–56 the Illini finished the season ranked in the Top 20 nationally every year. Illinois’ highest final ranking in the 1950s was second in both polls in 1952.

The 1956–57 team, unfortunately, would begin a downward spiral for Combes' tenure, sending the program into a timespan where his teams would finish in the lower half of the Big Ten for four of six years. A highlight of the 1957 season would take place on December 17, 1956, when Illinois defeated San Francisco, 62-33, snapping the Dons’ 51-game regular-season win streak. This season also marked the first time that a Fighting Illini team entered a holiday tournament. The Kentucky Invitational brought Southern Methodist, Dayton and Illinois to Lexington for a two-day tournament, once again matching Adolph Rupp with Combes. Combes had talented lettermen return including the leading scorers George Bon Salle, Don Ohl and team "captain" Harv Schmidt. It also saw the return of Bill Altenberger, Hiles Stout, John Paul and Ted Caiazza. The team also added sophomore Roger Taylor. The Illini finished the season with a conference record of 7 wins and 7 losses, finishing in 7th place in the Big Ten. They would finish with an overall record of 14 wins and 8 losses. The starting lineup included George Bon Salle at the center position, Roger Taylor and Don Ohl at guard and Harv Schmidt and Hiles Stout at the forward slots.

=== Roster ===
1956–57 Illinois Fighting Illini men's basketball team
Players
Coaches

Pos.	#	Name	Height	Weight	Year	Previous school	Hometown
F	10	Hiles Stout	6 ft 4 in (1.93 m)	205 lb (93 kg)	Sr	Central High School	Peoria, Illinois
G	12	Roger Taylor	6 ft 0 in (1.83 m)	160 lb (73 kg)	So	Rich High School	Park Forest, Illinois
F	14	Jim Chengary	6 ft 3 in (1.91 m)	190 lb (86 kg)	Jr	Bowen High School	Chicago, Illinois
G	20	Bill Altenberger	6 ft 1 in (1.85 m)	179 lb (81 kg)	Sr	Senior High School	East St. Louis, Illinois
C	22	George Bon Salle	6 ft 8 in (2.03 m)	225 lb (102 kg)	Sr	Loyola Academy	Chicago, Illinois
C	24	Ted Caiazza	6 ft 7 in (2.01 m)	235 lb (107 kg)	Jr	Lyons Township High School	LaGrange, Illinois
G	30	Billy Bolk	5 ft 11 in (1.8 m)	175 lb (79 kg)	Jr	James A. Garfield High School	Terre Haute, Indiana
F	32	Harvard Schmidt (C)	6 ft 6 in (1.98 m)	195 lb (88 kg)	Sr	Kankakee High School	Kankakee, Illinois
F	33	Al Gosnell	6 ft 4 in (1.93 m)	190 lb (86 kg)	So	Lawrenceville High School	Lawrenceville, Illinois
F	34	Larry Breyfogle	6 ft 3 in (1.91 m)	165 lb (75 kg)	Jr	Lawrenceville High School	Lawrenceville, Illinois
F	40	Lloyd Eggers	6 ft 3 in (1.91 m)	185 lb (84 kg)	So	Toledo High School	Toledo, Illinois
G	42	John Paul	6 ft 1 in (1.85 m)	175 lb (79 kg)	Jr	St. Edward High School	Elgin, Illinois
G	44	Don Ohl	6 ft 3 in (1.91 m)	180 lb (82 kg)	Jr	Edwardsville High School	Edwardsville, Illinois
C	48	Bob Brown	6 ft 7 in (2.01 m)	196 lb (89 kg)	So	DuPont High School	Wilmington, Delaware
F	52	Tom Haller	6 ft 3 in (1.91 m)	180 lb (82 kg)	So	Lockport Township High School	Lockport, Illinois
F	54	Bernie Thompson	6 ft 2 in (1.88 m)	175 lb (79 kg)	So	Fairmont Senior High School	Fairmont, West Virginia

Head coach

- Harry Combes (University of Illinois) (10th year)

Assistant coach(es)

- Howie Braun (University of Illinois) (20th year)
- Jim Bredar (University of Illinois) (1st year)
- Jess MacLeay (University of Illinois) (1st year)

Legend

- (C) Team captain
- (S) Suspended
- (I) Ineligible
- (W) Walk-on
- Injured
- Current redshirt

Roster

== Schedule ==
Date time, TV	Rank^{#}	Opponent^{#}	Result	Record	Site (attendance) city, state
Non-Conference regular season
12/5/1956*		Butler	W 98–81	1-0	Huff Hall (6,240); Champaign, IL
12/8/1956*		at Oklahoma	W 69–58	2-0	McCasland Field House (3,000); Norman, OK
12/15/1956*	No. 7	Loyola (New Orleans)	W 83–72	3-0	Huff Hall (6,128); Champaign, IL
12/17/1956*	No. 7	No. 2 San Francisco	W 62–33	4–0	Huff Hall (6,912); Champaign, IL
12/21/1956*	No. 5	vs. Dayton; Kentucky Invitational Tournament	W 82–65	5-0	Memorial Coliseum (7,000); Lexington, KY
12/22/1956*	No. 5	at No. 7 Kentucky; Kentucky Invitational Tournament	L 70–91	5-1	Memorial Coliseum (9,500); Lexington, KY
12/28/1956*	No. 6	Princeton	W 108–87	6-1	Huff Hall (2,559); Champaign, IL
Big Ten regular season
1/5/1957	No. 5	at No. 19 Minnesota	L 88–91	6-2 (0-1)	Williams Arena (14,062); Minneapolis, MN
1/7/1957	No. 5	Iowa; Rivalry	W 81–70	7-2 (1-1)	Huff Hall (3,390); Champaign, IL
1/12/1957	No. 10	at Wisconsin	W 79–63	8-2 (2-1)	Wisconsin Field House (4,000); Madison, WI
1/14/1957	No. 10	Indiana; Rivalry	W 112–91	9-2 (3-1)	Huff Hall (6,899); Champaign, IL
1/26/1957*	No. 9	vs. Notre Dame	W 99–81	10-2	Chicago Stadium (15,678); Chicago, IL
2/2/1957	No. 7	at Purdue	L 74–85	10-3 (3-2)	Lambert Fieldhouse (10,000); West Lafayette, IN
2/4/1957	No. 7	No. 11 Ohio State	W 96–89	11-3 (4-2)	Huff Hall (6,189); Champaign, IL
2/9/1957	No. 15	at Michigan State	L 64–70	11-4 (4-3)	Jenison Fieldhouse (7,394); East Lansing, MI
2/11/1957	No. 15	Northwestern; Rivalry	W 104–97	12-4 (5-3)	Huff Hall (6,899); Champaign, IL
2/16/1957	No. 16	at Michigan	L 89–102	12-5 (5-4)	Yost Field House (6,800); Ann Arbor, MI
2/18/1957	No. 16	Michigan State	L 83–89	12-6 (5-5)	Huff Hall (6,800); Champaign, IL
2/23/1957		Purdue	W 80–78	13-6 (6-5)	Huff Hall (6,850); Champaign, IL
2/25/1957		at Ohio State	W 79–72	14-6 (7-5)	St. John Arena (13,380); Columbus, OH
3/2/1957		Minnesota	L 75–86	14-7 (7-6)	Huff Hall (6,251); Champaign, IL
3/4/1957	No. 6	at No. 10 Indiana; Rivalry	L 76–84	14-8 (7-7)	The Fieldhouse (10,000); Bloomington, IN
*Non-conference game. ^{#}Rankings from AP Poll. (#) Tournament seedings in parentheses. All times are in Central Time.

== Player stats ==
Player	Games played	Field goals	Free throws	Points
Harv Schmidt	22	156	102	414
Don Ohl	22	145	53	343
George BonSalle	14	104	69	277
Hiles Stout	21	77	88	242
Roger Taylor	22	88	52	228
Bill Altenberger	18	72	26	170
John Paul	21	49	18	116
Ted Caiazza	18	8	14	30
Tom Haller	16	3	10	16
Larry Breyfogle	15	6	1	13
Jim Chengary	4	0	2	2
Bob Brown	1	0	0	0
Lloyd Eggers	4	0	0	0

== Awards and honors ==
- George Bon Salle
  - National Association of Basketball Coaches 2nd Team All-American
  - Converse Honorable Mention All-American
- Don Ohl
  - Converse Honorable Mention All-American
  - Associated Press Mention All-American
- Harv Schmidt
  - Converse 2nd Team All-American
  - Team Most Valuable Player

== Team players drafted into the NBA ==
Player	NBA club	Round	Pick
George Bon Salle	Syracuse Nationals	1	7
Harv Schmidt	Minneapolis Lakers	2	3
