= Steve Kuberski =

American basketball player (born 1947)

Personal information
- Born: November 6, 1947 (age 79) Moline, Illinois, U.S.
- Listed height: 6 ft 8 in (2.03 m)
- Listed weight: 215 lb (98 kg)

Career information
- High school: Moline (Moline, Illinois)
- College: Illinois (1966–1967); Bradley (1968–1969)
- NBA draft: 1969: 4th round, 52nd overall pick
- Drafted by: Boston Celtics
- Playing career: 1969–1977
- Position: Power forward / center
- Number: 11, 22, 33

Career history
- 1969–1974: Boston Celtics
- 1974–1975: Milwaukee Bucks
- 1975: Buffalo Braves
- 1975–1977: Boston Celtics

Career highlights
- 2× NBA champion (1974, 1976); First-team All-MVC (1969)

Career statistics
- Points: 3,114 (5.5 ppg)
- Rebounds: 2,146 (3.8 rpg)
- Assists: 338 (0.6 apg)
- Stats at NBA.com
- Stats at Basketball Reference

Stephen Phil Kuberski (born November 6, 1947) is an American former professional basketball player. Kuberski won two NBA titles with the Boston Celtics, in 1974 and 1976 and had a nine-year National Basketball Association (NBA) career. Kuberski was the last Celtic to wear number 33 before Larry Bird.

== Early life ==
Born in Moline, Illinois to Elaine (d.2015) and Felix Kuberski (d. 1983), Steve was raised with siblings Susan, Kathy, Carol and Brian.

== High school career ==
Kuberski played high school basketball at Moline High School in Moline, Illinois, one of the Quad Cities. Moline played in Wharton Field House, a former home of the early NBA's Tri-Cities Blackhawks, who were coached by a young Red Auerbach.

Kuberski became a starter for the Moline Maroons in the 1963–64 season, as a 6-foot-5 junior. He averaged a team-high 14.0 points, as Moline finished 15–8 under Coach Harv Schmidt.

As a senior in 1964–1965, Kuberski, under new Coach Herb Thompson, led Moline to the Illinois High School Association Tournament Elite Eight as the Maroons finished 25–3. In his final home game at Wharton Field House, Kuberski scored 50 points against Cedar Rapids Washington.

The Maroons lost in the Illinois High School Association Tournament semifinal to Chicago Marshall 75–72. "It was the most disappointing loss of my career, college or pro," Kuberski said later. "I had some big losses with the Celtics that cost a lot of money. We lost to the Knicks in the seventh game in the NBA playoff, but the Marshall loss was even more disappointing. We should have been the first Quad City champion."

Kuberski made the All-Tournament Team at the conclusion of the IHSA Tournament, scoring 64 points in two games.

During his senior year at Moline, Kuberski scored 749 points in 28 games, an average of 26.7 per game.

Listed as a Top-30 national recruit, Kuberski was recruited by UCLA, but ultimately chose to attend the University of Illinois over Notre Dame University.

== College career ==
Kuberski attended the University of Illinois, playing for the Illini freshman team in 1965–1966, as NCAA freshman did not play varsity in that era. Kuberski was then ruled ineligible for the 1967–68 academic year by the Big Ten Conference on March 4, 1967. Kuberski was suspended for receiving financial assistance of US$35 per month from a slush fund established illegally by the school's athletic department.

Kuberski, and teammates Rich Jones and Ron Dunlap, along with two others, had been suspended indefinitely while Illinois did an internal investigation during the 1966–1967 Illini season. Numerous other athletes in other sports were involved and Coach Harry Combes subsequently resigned. Kuberski, Jones and Dunlap never played for Illinois again.

After the ruling, Kuberski transferred from Illinois to Bradley University in Peoria, Illinois after the 1966–1967 school year.

In 1966–1967, Kuberski had played in 5 games for Illinois under Coach Combes, averaging 3.2 points and 2.3 rebounds, before being suspended. After transferring to Bradley, Kuberski sat out the 1967–1968 season due to the transfer.

In the 1967–68 season, Kuberski played for an Amateur Athletic Union (AAU) team from Macomb, Illinois and landed a tryout with the 1968 U.S. Olympic team. "That was a good experience for me because we played against older, more experienced players," Kuberski said.

In 1968–1969, Kuberski averaged 23.0 points, 10.1 rebounds and 1.6 assists for the Bradley Braves, as the team finished 14–12 under Coach Joe Stowell in the Missouri Valley Conference.

"I had planned to play as a senior at Bradley," Kuberski recalled, "but I had played with (former Rock Island High School star) Don Nelson at the Moline YMCA and he tipped off the Celtics about me." "We were just playing one-on-one but he went back to Boston and said they should take a look at this kid when his class comes up," Kuberski reflected. "They drafted me on whim a year early."

== NBA career ==
Kuberski was drafted out of Bradley University by the Carolina Cougars in the 1969 ABA draft and by the Boston Celtics in the 1969 NBA draft.

=== Boston Celtics 1969–1974) ===
Kuberski was drafted by the Celtics in the 4th round of the 1969 NBA draft, as he was eligible because his original class was graduating. Kuberski signed with the Celtics and GM Red Auerbach in September 1969, foregoing a potential final season of collegiate eligibility. Kuberski rejected an initial one-year contract and signed when Boston offered a three-year contract.

As a rookie in 1969–1970, Kuberski played alongside Naismith Basketball Hall of Famers John Havlicek, Satch Sanders, his Quad City friend Don Nelson, Bailey Howell and rookie Jo Jo White, averaging 6.4 points and 5.0 rebounds under Coach Tommy Heinsohn.

In 1970–1971, Kuberski averaged 22 minutes for the 44–38 Celtics, averaging 9.3 points and 6.6 rebounds, playing alongside rookie and future Hall of Famer Dave Cowens.

The Celtics finished 56–26 in 1971–1972, with Kuberski averaging 6.3 points and 4.5 rebounds. The Celtics were defeated by the New York Knicks in the Eastern Conference finals 4–1 after defeating the Atlanta Hawks 4–2 in the earlier series. Coach Heinshohn said of Kuberski in 1972, “Steve’s been playing like a Polish lineman from Notre Dame.”

The Celtics finished 68–14 in 1972–1973 and Kuberski contributed 4.4 points and 2.5 points in nine minutes per game. As in the previous season, the Celtics defeated the Atlanta Hawks (4–2) in the playoffs before losing to the New York Knicks 4–3 in the Eastern Conference Finals. The Knicks went on to win the NBA Championship.

The Celtics captured the 1974 NBA Championship under Coach Heinsohn in 1973–1974. Kuberski averaged 5.1 points in the regular season, as the Celtics finished 56–26. The Celtics defeated the Milwaukee Bucks with Kareem Abdul-Jabbar, Oscar Robertson and Bob Dandridge in the NBA Finals.

=== Milwaukee Bucks (1974–1975) ===
On May 20, 1974, Kuberski was drafted by the New Orleans Jazz from the Boston Celtics in the NBA expansion draft. Later, on October 8, 1974, Kuberski was traded by the New Orleans Jazz with a 1975 2nd round draft pick (Clyde Mayes was later selected) to the Milwaukee Bucks for Russ Lee and a 1975 1st round draft pick (Rich Kelley was later selected).

"We have always thought a lot of Kuberski," Bucks Coach Larry Costello said at the time of the trade. "He's a strong rebounder, he has physical toughness and he can run. He proved himself a winner with the Celtics before New Orleans got him in the expansion draft."

Milwaukee finished 38–44 in 1974–1975, under Coach Costello, despite 30.0 points per game from Kareem Abdul-Jabbar. Kuberski played sparingly, averaging 2.8 points and 2.1 rebounds in 8 minutes per game.

=== Buffalo Braves (1975) ===
On October 16, 1975, Kuberski was claimed on waivers by the Buffalo Braves from the Milwaukee Bucks. Kuberski played 10 games with the Braves, and Coach Jack Ramsay, averaging 1.7 points and 2.1 rebounds. On November 20, 1975, Kuberski was waived by the Buffalo Braves.

=== Boston Celtics (1975–1977) ===
On December 11, 1975, Kuberski was signed as a free agent by Red Auerbach and the Boston Celtics, reuniting with his former team. After the Celtics claimed Kuberski off waivers, they immediately put him into the starting lineup and won 14 of their next 16 games, en route to the Atlantic Division and an NBA title.

The Celtics captured the 1976 NBA Championship under Coach Heinsohn, as Kuberski played in 60 games, averaging 5.4 points and 3.9 rebounds. He was usually in the starting line-up, enabling Paul Silas to come off the bench. The Celtics defeated Kuberski's former team, the Buffalo Braves, 4–2 and then the Cleveland Cavaliers 4–2 en route to the NBA Finals. In the Braves series, Kuberski started and played for the injured John Havlicek in Game 2 and scored 12 points. In the NBA Finals, the Celtics defeated the Phoenix Suns 4–2, as Kuberski averaged 5.5 points and 3.5 rebounds in the series, earning a second championship ring.

In the 1976–77 season, Kuberski played 76 games for the 44–38 Celtics, averaging 4.3 points and 3.8 rebounds. The Celtics were defeated by the Philadelphia 76ers 4–3 in the Eastern Conference semi-finals after defeating the San Antonio Spurs 2–0.

After playing in three 1977–78 season games, Kuberski was placed on waivers by the Celtics on December 8, 1977. He did not play again in the NBA.

Overall, Kuberski played nine National Basketball Association seasons for the Boston Celtics, Milwaukee Bucks, and Buffalo Braves, averaging 5.5 points and 3.8 rebounds per game. In 80 career playoff games, Kuberski averaged 5.7 points and 3.0 rebounds.

Of his career, Kuberski said, “I was fortunate to be out here (Boston) and play on two championship teams. A lot of guys who are good players and great players never get to experience that. The sense of accomplishment as a team was more gratifying than any individual award I won. Back then you were just one piece of the puzzle and that’s the way Red Auerbach played the game.”

== NBA career statistics ==
Legend
GP	Games played	GS	Games started	MPG	Minutes per game
FG%	Field goal percentage	3P%	3-point field goal percentage	FT%	Free throw percentage
RPG	Rebounds per game	APG	Assists per game	SPG	Steals per game
BPG	Blocks per game	PPG	Points per game	**Bold**	Career high
†	Won an NBA championship

=== Regular season ===
Year	Team	GP	GS	MPG	FG%	3P%	FT%	RPG	APG	SPG	BPG	PPG
1969–70	Boston	51	–	15.6	.388	–	.696	5.0	0.6	–	–	6.4
1970–71	Boston	**82**	–	**22.8**	.420	–	.727	**6.6**	**1.0**	–	–	**9.3**
1971–72	Boston	71	–	15.9	.417	–	.784	4.5	0.6	–	–	6.3
1972–73	Boston	78	–	9.8	.403	–	.774	2.5	0.3	–	–	4.4
1973–74†	Boston	78	–	12.6	.427	–	.775	3.0	0.5	0.1	0.1	5.1
1974–75	Milwaukee	59	–	8.8	.390	–	.786	2.1	0.6	0.2	0.1	2.8
1975–76	Buffalo	10	–	8.5	.412	–	**1.000**	2.5	0.3	0.1	**0.2**	1.7
1975–76†	Boston	60	–	14.7	**.467**	–	.895	3.9	0.7	0.2	**0.2**	5.4
1976–77	Boston	76	–	11.3	.420	–	.759	2.8	0.5	0.1	0.1	4.3
1977–78	Boston	3	–	4.7	.250	–	.000	2.0	0.0	**0.3**	0.0	0.7
Career		568	–	13.9	.417	–	.767	3.8	0.6	0.1	0.1	5.5

=== Playoffs ===
Year	Team	GP	GS	MPG	FG%	3P%	FT%	RPG	APG	SPG	BPG	PPG
1971–72	Boston	11	–	**19.8**	**.552**	–	**.842**	**5.7**	0.3	–	–	**11.6**
1972–73	Boston	12	–	7.9	.413	–	.700	1.2	0.3	–	–	3.8
1973–74†	Boston	9	–	7.7	.200	–	.500	2.2	0.2	**0.1**	0.1	1.7
1975–76†	Boston	**18**	–	12.9	.469	–	.808	2.8	**0.9**	0.0	**0.2**	5.4
Career		50	–	12.3	.460	–	.774	3.0	0.5	0.0	0.1	5.7

== Personal life ==
Kuberski and his wife Diane married in 1967, after they met when she was a cheerleader at Moline High School. They have two sons Jason and Matthew.

Steve Kuberski founded his own company in the New England area in 1982, making lockers for schools, country clubs, restaurants and warehouse products.

== Honors ==
- Kuberski was inducted into the Illinois Basketball Coaches Association Hall of Fame in 1974.
- Moline High School inducted Kuberski as part of the charter class of the Hall of Honor 2000.
- In 2001, Kuberski was inducted to the Quad City Sports Hall of Fame.
- Bleacher Report named Kuberski as #50 on the list of "50 Greatest Celtics", in 2011.
