= 1966–67 Michigan Wolverines men's basketball team =

American college basketball season

1966–67 Michigan Wolverines men's basketball
- Conference: Big Ten Conference
- Record: 8–16 (2–12 Big Ten)
- Head coach: Dave Strack
- Captains: Craig Dill; Dennis Bankey
- Home arena: Yost Field House

1966–67 Big Ten Conference men's basketball standings
	Conf.				Overall
Team	W		L	PCT	W		L	PCT
Michigan State	10	–	4	.714	16	–	7	.696
Indiana	10	–	4	.714	18	–	8	.692
Iowa	9	–	5	.643	16	–	8	.667
Wisconsin	8	–	6	.571	15	–	9	.625
Purdue	7	–	7	.500	15	–	9	.625
Northwestern	7	–	7	.500	11	–	11	.500
Ohio State	6	–	8	.429	13	–	11	.542
Illinois	6	–	8	.429	12	–	12	.500
Minnesota	5	–	9	.357	9	–	15	.375
Michigan	2	–	12	.143	8	–	16	.333
Rankings from AP Poll

The 1966–67 Michigan Wolverines men's basketball team represented the University of Michigan in intercollegiate basketball during the 1966–67 season. The team finished the season in tenth place in the Big Ten Conference with an overall record of 8–16 and 2–12 against conference opponents.

Dave Strack was in his seventh year as the team's head coach. Craig Dill was the team's leading scorer with 471 points in 24 games for an average of 19.5 points per game. Dill also led the team with 209 rebounds.

== Scoring statistics ==
Player	Pos.	Yr	G	FG	FT	RB	Pts	PPG
Craig Dill	C	Sr.	24	184-422	103-131	209	471	19.6
Jim Pitts	G	Jr.	23	138-301	86-145	186	362	15.7
Dennis Stewart	F	Soph.	23	143-368	56-81	160	342	14.9
Bob Sullivan	G	Soph.	23	92-204	74-109	143	258	11.2
Dennis Bankey			24	70-143	33-47	81	173	7.2
Dave McClellan	C	Soph.	22	73-130	24-34	113	170	7.7
Ken Maxey			24	63-181	29-42	57	155	6.5
Totals			24	783-1818	415-607	1201	1981	82.5

== Team players drafted into the NBA ==
Two players from this team were selected in the NBA draft.

Year	Round	Pick	Overall	Player	NBA Club
1967	4	11	42	Craig Dill	San Diego Rockets
1969	4	1	44	Dennis Stewart	Phoenix Suns
