= 1963–64 Illinois Fighting Illini men's basketball team =

American college basketball season

1963–64 Illinois Fighting Illini men's basketball
- Conference: Big Ten Conference
- Record: 13-11 (6-8 Big Ten)
- Head coach: Harry Combes (17th season)
- Assistant coaches: Howie Braun (27th season); Jim Wright (6th season)
- MVP: Skip Thoren
- Captain: Bill Edwards
- Home arena: Assembly Hall

1963–64 Big Ten Conference men's basketball standings
	Conf.				Overall
Team	W		L	PCT	W		L	PCT
No. 2 Michigan	11	–	3	.786	23	–	5	.821
Ohio State	11	–	3	.786	16	–	8	.667
Minnesota	10	–	4	.714	17	–	7	.708
Michigan State	8	–	6	.571	14	–	10	.583
Purdue	8	–	6	.571	12	–	12	.500
Illinois	6	–	8	.429	13	–	11	.542
Northwestern	6	–	8	.429	8	–	13	.381
Indiana	5	–	9	.357	9	–	15	.375
Iowa	3	–	11	.214	8	–	15	.348
Wisconsin	2	–	12	.143	8	–	16	.333
Rankings from AP Poll

The 1963–64 Illinois Fighting Illini men's basketball team represented the University of Illinois.

== Regular season ==
The 1963-64 Fighting Illini basketball team, playing in their first full season in Assembly Hall, dropped back from its previous championship season with a losing finish in the Big Ten and a mediocre overall record. Head coach Harry Combes guided the Illini to a 10-3 record after the first 13 games of the season only to see the team reverse trends and go 3-8 the rest of the way. Once again the Illini played in a mid-season tournament, playing in the Los Angeles Basketball Classic. During the tournament the Illini would face eventual national champion, UCLA.

The 1963-64 team utilized several returning lettermen including the leading scorer and team "MVP" Skip Thoren. It also saw the return of team captain Bill Edwards, juniors Tal Brody, Bogie Redmon, Bill McKeown as well as sophomores Don Freeman, Jim Vopicka and Larry Hinton to their lineup. The Illini finished the season with a conference record of 6 wins and 8 losses, finishing in a 6th place tie in the Big Ten. They would finish with an overall record of 13 wins and 11 losses. The starting lineup included Skip Thoren at the center position, Tal Brody and Jim Vopicka at guard and Don Freeman and Bogie Redmon at the forward slots.

=== Roster ===
1963–64 Illinois Fighting Illini men's basketball team
Players
Coaches

Pos.	#	Name	Height	Weight	Year	Previous school	Hometown
F	10	Larry Bauer	6 ft 7 in (2.01 m)	207 lb (94 kg)	Jr	Springfield High School	Springfield, Illinois
G	11	Bob Meadows	5 ft 7 in (1.7 m)	157 lb (71 kg)	Jr	Collinsville High School	Collinsville, Illinois
G	12	Tal Brody	6 ft 2 in (1.88 m)	170 lb (77 kg)	Jr	Central High School	Trenton, New Jersey
F	14	John Love	6 ft 3 in (1.91 m)	190 lb (86 kg)	Sr	Ottawa Township High School	Ottawa, Illinois
G	15	Don Freeman	6 ft 2 in (1.88 m)	180 lb (82 kg)	So	Madison High School	Madison, Illinois
F	20	Mel Blackwell	6 ft 2 in (1.88 m)	168 lb (76 kg)	So	Centralia High School	Centralia, Illinois
G	22	Jim Vopicka	6 ft 1 in (1.85 m)	170 lb (77 kg)	So	Morton West High School	Brookfield, Illinois
G	23	Ron Beeks	6 ft 1 in (1.85 m)	180 lb (82 kg)	Jr	Princeton High School	Princeton, New Jersey
F	30	Jeff Ferguson	6 ft 3 in (1.91 m)	195 lb (88 kg)	Sr	Benton Consolidated High School	Benton, Illinois
G	31	Tony Latham	5 ft 10 in (1.78 m)	163 lb (74 kg)	Jr	Waukegan High School	Waukegan, Illinois
G	32	Bill Edwards (C)	6 ft 2 in (1.88 m)	185 lb (84 kg)	Sr	Windsor High School	Windsor, Illinois
F	33	Bogie Redmon	6 ft 5 in (1.96 m)	225 lb (102 kg)	Jr	Collinsville High School	Collinsville, Illinois
G	34	Bill McKeown	6 ft 2 in (1.88 m)	185 lb (84 kg)	Jr	Clinton High School	Clinton, Illinois
C	35	Skip Thoren	6 ft 8 in (2.03 m)	215 lb (98 kg)	Jr	Rockford East High School	Rockford, Illinois
G/F	40	Bob Brown	6 ft 2 in (1.88 m)	190 lb (86 kg)	So	P. S. Dupont High School	Wilmington, DE
F	43	Larry Hinton	6 ft 2 in (1.88 m)	185 lb (84 kg)	So	Shelbyville High School	Shelbyville, Illinois
F	44	Mike Graville	6 ft 1 in (1.85 m)	170 lb (77 kg)	So	Madison High School	Madison, Illinois
F	53	George Johnson	6 ft 2 in (1.88 m)	185 lb (84 kg)	So	York High School	Elmhurst, Illinois
F	54	Dan Lee	6 ft 3 in (1.91 m)	175 lb (79 kg)	So	Attica High School	Attica, Indiana

Head coach

- Harry Combes (University of Illinois) (17th year)

Assistant coach(es)

- Howie Braun (University of Illinois) (27th year)
- Jim Wright (University of Illinois) (6th year)

Legend

- (C) Team captain
- (S) Suspended
- (I) Ineligible
- (W) Walk-on
- Injured
- Current redshirt

Roster

== Schedule ==
Date time, TV	Rank^{#}	Opponent^{#}	Result	Record	Site (attendance) city, state
Non-Conference regular season
11/30/1963*		at Butler	W 59-52	1-0	Hinkle Fieldhouse (11,400); Indianapolis, IN
12/4/1963*		St. Louis	L 78-81	2-0	Assembly Hall (14,327); Champaign, IL
12/9/1963*		at Oklahoma	L 104-105	1-2	McCasland Field House (3,800); Norman, OK
12/14/1963*		Notre Dame	W 79-68	2-2	Assembly Hall (14,238); Champaign, IL
12/19/1963*		Butler	W 74-53	3-2	Assembly Hall (13,681); Champaign, IL
12/26/1963*		vs. West Virginia; Los Angeles Basketball Classic	W 92-86	4-2	Los Angeles Memorial Sports Arena (5,104); Los Angeles, CA
12/27/1963*		vs. Pittsburgh; Los Angeles Basketball Classic	W 83-76	5-2	Los Angeles Memorial Sports Arena (14,267); Los Angeles, CA
12/28/1963*		at No. 4 UCLA; Los Angeles Basketball Classic	L 79-83	5-3	Los Angeles Memorial Sports Arena (13,060); Los Angeles, CA
12/31/1963*		vs. Notre Dame	W 87-78	6-3	Chicago Stadium (13,571); Chicago, IL
Big Ten regular season
1/4/1964		Michigan State	W 87-66	7-3 (1-0)	Assembly Hall (14,141); Champaign, IL
1/11/1964		at Iowa; Rivalry	W 87-70	8-3 (2-0)	Iowa Field House (8,800); Iowa City, IA
1/25/1964*		vs. Arizona State	W 97-78	9-3	Chicago Stadium (19,000); Chicago, IL
2/1/1964		Northwestern; Rivalry	W 73-71	10-3 (3-0)	Assembly Hall (10,093); Champaign, IL
2/3/1964		at Indiana; Rivalry	L 96-104	10-4 (3-1)	New Fieldhouse (8,002); Bloomington, IN
2/8/1964		No. 2 Michigan	L 82-93	10-5 (3-2)	Assembly Hall (16,128); Champaign, IL
2/10/1964		at Ohio State	L 92-110	10-6 (3-3)	St. John Arena (11,351); Columbus, OH
2/15/1964		at Minnesota	L 81-92	10-7 (3-4)	Williams Arena (12,461); Minneapolis, MN
2/17/1964		at Michigan State	L 82-85	10-8 (3-5)	Jenison Fieldhouse (6,124); East Lansing, MI
2/22/1964		Minnesota	W 86-78	11-8 (4-5)	Assembly Hall (15,676); Champaign, IL
2/24/1964		at Purdue	L 90-105	11-9 (4-6)	Lambert Fieldhouse (8,184); West Lafayette, IN
2/28/1964		at No. 3 Michigan	L 83-89	11-10 (4-7)	Yost Field House (7,875); Ann Arbor, MI
3/2/1964		Ohio State	L 74-86	11-11 (4-8)	Assembly Hall (8,643); Champaign, IL
3/7/1964		Wisconsin	W 97-73	12-11 (5-8)	Assembly Hall (15,826); Champaign, IL
3/9/1964		Iowa; Rivalry	W 90-67	13-11 (6-8)	Assembly Hall (13,676); Champaign, IL
*Non-conference game. ^{#}Rankings from AP Poll. (#) Tournament seedings in parentheses. All times are in Central Time.

== Player stats ==
Player	Games Played	Field goals	Free Throws	Rebounds	Points
Skip Thoren	24	187	114	331	488
Tal Brody	24	157	91	97	405
Don Freeman	24	130	81	231	341
Bogie Redmon	24	97	37	148	231
Jim Vopicka	24	56	24	62	136
Bill McKeown	15	46	17	34	109
Larry Hinton	23	36	18	54	90
Bill Edwards	20	32	24	24	88
Mel Blackwell	17	14	14	33	42
Bob Brown	16	14	12	7	40
Larry Bauer	12	11	6	24	28
John Love	16	6	2	17	14
Jeff Ferguson	2	0	4	0	4
Dan Lee	1	0	0	1	0
Bob Meadows	1	0	0	0	0

== Awards and honors ==
- Tal Brody
  - Converse Honorable Mention All-American
  - Sporting News Honorable Mention All-American
- Duane "Skip" Thoren
  - Converse Honorable Mention All-American
  - Team Most Valuable Player

== Team players drafted into the NBA ==
Player	NBA club	Round	Pick
No Player Selected			
