= Anderegg =

Anderegg is a surname. Notable people with the surname include:

- Bob Anderegg (1937–2024), American basketball player
- Jake Anderegg, American politician
- Jakob Anderegg (1829–1878), Swiss mountain guide
- Melchior Anderegg (1828–1914), Swiss mountain guide
