= University of Illinois scandal =

University of Illinois scandal can refer to:

- University of Illinois clout scandal
- University of Illinois slush fund scandal
