= 1956–57 Indiana Hoosiers men's basketball team =

American college basketball season

1956–57 Indiana Hoosiers men's basketball

Big Ten Co-Champions
- Conference: Big Ten Conference

Ranking
- Coaches: No. 15
- Record: 14–8 (10–4 Big Ten)
- Head coach: Branch McCracken (16th season)
- Assistant coaches: Lou Watson; Ernie Andres
- Captain: Charlie Hodson
- Home arena: The Fieldhouse

1956–57 Big Ten Conference men's basketball standings
	Conf.				Overall
Team	W		L	PCT	W		L	PCT
Indiana	10	–	4	.714	14	–	8	.636
No. 11 Michigan State	10	–	4	.714	16	–	10	.615
Minnesota	9	–	5	.643	14	–	8	.636
Ohio State	9	–	5	.643	14	–	8	.636
Purdue	8	–	6	.571	15	–	7	.682
Michigan	8	–	6	.571	13	–	9	.591
Illinois	7	–	7	.500	14	–	8	.636
Iowa	4	–	10	.286	8	–	14	.364
Wisconsin	3	–	11	.214	5	–	17	.227
Northwestern	2	–	12	.143	6	–	16	.273
Rankings from AP Poll

The 1956–57 Indiana Hoosiers men's basketball team represented Indiana University. Their head coach was Branch McCracken, who was in his 16th year. The team played its home games in The Fieldhouse in Bloomington, Indiana, and was a member of the Big Ten Conference.

The Hoosiers finished the regular season with an overall record of 14–8 and a conference record of 10–4, finishing 1st in the Big Ten Conference. Despite being Big Ten Conference Champions, Indiana was not invited to participate in any postseason tournament.

== Roster ==
No.	Name	Position	Ht.	Year	Hometown
15	Sam Gee	G	6–1	Jr.	Washington, Indiana
20	Jerry Schofield	G	6–1	So.	Monticello, Indiana
21	Hallie Bryant	G	6–3	Sr.	Indianapolis, Indiana
22	Archie Dees	C	6–8	Jr.	Mount Carmel, Illinois
23	Charlie Hodson	G	5–9	Sr.	Muncie, Indiana
24	Ray Ball	F	6–3	Jr.	Elkhart, Indiana
25	Clarence Doninger	F	6–3	Sr.	Evansville, Indiana
30	Lee Aldridge	C	6–6	So.	Switz City, Indiana
31	Jim Hinds	F	6–5	So.	Muncie, Indiana
32	Gene Flowers	F	6–2	So.	Muncie, Indiana
35	Dick Neal	F	6–5	Sr.	Reelsville, Indiana
40	Thomas Hayes	G	6–1	So.	Chicago, Illinois
42	Bill Balch	F	6–5	So.	Crawfordsville, Indiana
43	Pete Obremskey	F	6–3	Jr.	Jeffersonville, Indiana
45	Jerry Thompson	F	6–5	Jr.	South Bend, Indiana

== Schedule/results ==
Date time, TV	Rank^{#}	Opponent^{#}	Result	Record	Site city, state
Regular season
12/4/1956*		Valparaiso	W 64–57	1–0	The Fieldhouse; Bloomington, IN
12/8/1956*		Southern Illinois	W 80–57	2–0	The Fieldhouse; Bloomington, IN
12/10/1956*		Butler	W 73–68	3–0	The Fieldhouse; Bloomington, IN
12/15/1956*		at Kansas State	L 77–84	3–1	Ahearn Field House; Manhattan, KS
12/18/1956*		at La Salle	W 93–80	4–1	Palestra; Philadelphia, PA
12/20/1956*		at Villanova	L 69–79	4–2	Villanova Field House; Villanova, PA
12/29/1956*		UCLA	L 48–52	4–3	The Fieldhouse; Bloomington, IN
1/5/1957		Michigan	W 73–68	5–3 (1–0)	The Fieldhouse; Bloomington, IN
1/7/1957		Wisconsin	W 79–68	6–3 (2–0)	The Fieldhouse; Bloomington, IN
1/12/1957		at Purdue; Rivalry	L 64–70	6–4 (2–1)	Lambert Fieldhouse; West Lafayette, IN
1/14/1957		at Illinois; Rivalry	L 91–112	6–5 (2–2)	Huff Hall; Champaign, IL
1/29/1957*		at Notre Dame	L 82–94	6–6 (2–2)	Notre Dame Fieldhouse; Notre Dame, IN
2/2/1957		at Iowa	W 82–66	7–6 (3–2)	Iowa Field House; Iowa City, IA
2/4/1957		Northwestern	W 74–56	8–6 (4–2)	The Fieldhouse; Bloomington, IN
2/9/1957		Ohio State	W 69–59	9–6 (5–2)	The Fieldhouse; Bloomington, IN
2/11/1957		Minnesota	W 91–72	10–6 (6–2)	The Fieldhouse; Bloomington, IN
2/16/1957	No. 18	at Northwestern	W 87–74	11–6 (7–2)	Welsh-Ryan Arena; Evanston, IL
2/18/1957	No. 18	Iowa	W 90–76	12–6 (8–2)	The Fieldhouse; Bloomington, IN
2/23/1957	No. 11	at Wisconsin	W 85–74	13–6 (9–2)	Wisconsin Field House; Madison, WI
2/25/1957	No. 11	at Michigan	L 86–87	13–7 (9–3)	Yost Field House; Ann Arbor, MI
3/2/1957	No. 10	at Michigan State	L 61–76	13–8 (9–4)	Jenison Fieldhouse; East Lansing, MI
3/4/1957	No. 10	Illinois; Rivalry	W 84–76	14–8 (10–4)	The Fieldhouse; Bloomington, IN
*Non-conference game. ^{#}Rankings from AP Poll. (#) Tournament seedings in parentheses.
