= 1966–67 Iowa Hawkeyes men's basketball team =

American college basketball season

1966–67 Iowa Hawkeyes men's basketball
- Conference: Big Ten Conference
- Record: 16–8 (9–5 Big Ten)
- Head coach: Ralph Miller (3rd season)
- Assistant coaches: Lanny Van Eman; Dick Schultz
- MVP: Sam Williams
- Home arena: Iowa Field House (Capacity: 13,365)

1966–67 Big Ten Conference men's basketball standings
	Conf.				Overall
Team	W		L	PCT	W		L	PCT
Michigan State	10	–	4	.714	16	–	7	.696
Indiana	10	–	4	.714	18	–	8	.692
Iowa	9	–	5	.643	16	–	8	.667
Wisconsin	8	–	6	.571	15	–	9	.625
Purdue	7	–	7	.500	15	–	9	.625
Northwestern	7	–	7	.500	11	–	11	.500
Ohio State	6	–	8	.429	13	–	11	.542
Illinois	6	–	8	.429	12	–	12	.500
Minnesota	5	–	9	.357	9	–	15	.375
Michigan	2	–	12	.143	8	–	16	.333
Rankings from AP Poll

The 1966–67 Iowa Hawkeyes men's basketball team represented the University of Iowa in intercollegiate basketball during the 1966–67 season. The team was led by Ralph Miller and played their home games at the Iowa Field House. The Hawkeyes finished the season 16–8 and were 9-5 in Big Ten conference games.

== Roster ==
1966–67 Iowa Hawkeyes men's basketball team
Players
Coaches

Pos.	#	Name	Height	Weight	Year	Hometown
G	3	Jim Hodge	6 ft 0 in (1.83 m)	—	Fr
F/C	4	Dick Jensen	6 ft 8 in (2.03 m)	—	Fr	Madrid, Iowa
F/C	10	Dick Agnew	—	—	Jr
G	11	Ron Norman	6 ft 3 in (1.91 m)	—	Jr
G	13	Dave White	—	—	Sr
	14	Frank Nelson	—	—	So
F	23	Gerry Jones	6 ft 4 in (1.93 m)	—	Sr	Chicago, Illinois
G	24	Chris Phillips	6 ft 3 in (1.91 m)	—	So
G	25	Tom Chapman	6 ft 3 in (1.91 m)	—	Sr	Fort Dodge, Iowa
G	42	Rolly McGrath	6 ft 1 in (1.85 m)	—	Jr
G	43	Chad Calabria	6 ft 1 in (1.85 m)	—	Fr	Aliquippa, Pennsylvania
F	44	Glenn Vidnovic	6 ft 5 in (1.96 m)	—	Fr	McKeesport, Pennsylvania
F	51	Huston Breedlove	6 ft 6 in (1.98 m)	—	Jr	Akron, Ohio
	52	Tom Schulze	—	—	Fr
G/F	53	Sam Williams	6 ft 3 in (1.91 m)	—	Jr	Detroit, Michigan

Head coach

- Ralph Miller (Kansas)

Assistant coach(es)

Legend

- (C) Team captain
- (S) Suspended
- (I) Ineligible
- (W) Walk-on
- Injured
- Current redshirt

== Schedule/results ==
Date time, TV	Rank^{#}	Opponent^{#}	Result	Record	Site (attendance) city, state
Non-conference regular season
Dec 2, 1966*		at Washington	W 66–50	1–0	Hec Edmundson Pavilion; Seattle, Washington
Dec 3, 1966*		at Washington	L 65–76	1–1	Hec Edmundson Pavilion; Seattle, Washington
Dec 5, 1966*		at Creighton	L 68–69	1–2	Omaha Civic Auditorium; Omaha, Nebraska
Dec 10, 1966*		at Drake	W 90–83	2–2	Veterans Memorial Auditorium; Des Moines, Iowa
Dec 17, 1966*		Drake	W 83–75	3–2	Iowa Field House; Iowa City, Iowa
Dec 21, 1966*		California	W 72–62	4–2	Iowa Field House; Iowa City, Iowa
Dec 23, 1966*		Stanford	W 77–74	5–2	Iowa Field House; Iowa City, Iowa
Dec 28, 1966*		Wichita State	W 94–76	6–2	Iowa Field House; Iowa City, Iowa
Dec 30, 1966*		vs. No. 7 Cincinnati	W 78–69	7–2	
Big Ten Regular Season
Jan 7, 1967		Indiana	W 84–73	8–2 (1–0)	Iowa Field House; Iowa City, Iowa
Jan 14, 1967		at Michigan State	L 70–79	8–3 (1–1)	Jenison Field House; East Lansing, Michigan
Jan 21, 1967		at Northwestern	L 88–90	8–4 (1–2)	McGaw Memorial Hall; Evanston, Illinois
Jan 23, 1967*		Michigan	W 91–81	9–4 (2–2)	Iowa Field House; Iowa City, Iowa
Feb 4, 1967*		at Loyola-Chicago	L 87–98	9–5	Alumni Gym; Chicago, Illinois
Feb 7, 1967		Illinois	W 96–89	10–5 (3–2)	Iowa Field House; Iowa City, Iowa
Feb 11, 1967		at Ohio State	W 73–72	11–5 (4–2)	St. John Arena; Columbus, Ohio
Feb 14, 1967		Northwestern	W 80–75	12–5 (5–2)	Iowa Field House; Iowa City, Iowa
Feb 18, 1967		Wisconsin	L 95–96	12–6 (5–3)	Iowa Field House; Iowa City, Iowa
Feb 21, 1967		at Minnesota	L 86–88	12–7 (5–4)	Williams Arena; Minneapolis, Minnesota
Feb 25, 1967		at Indiana	W 75–74 ^{OT}	13–7 (6–4)	New Field House; Bloomington, Indiana
Feb 27, 1967		Purdue	L 75–78	13–8 (6–5)	Iowa Field House; Iowa City, Iowa
Mar 4, 1967		Ohio State	W 90–56	14–8 (7–5)	Iowa Field House; Iowa City, Iowa
Mar 7, 1967		at Wisconsin	W 90–87	15–8 (8–5)	Wisconsin Field House; Madison, Wisconsin
Mar 11, 1967		at Michigan	W 83–76	16–8 (9–5)	Yost Field House; Ann Arbor, MI
*Non-conference game. ^{#}Rankings from AP Poll. (#) Tournament seedings in parentheses.
