= 1963–64 Indiana Hoosiers men's basketball team =

American college basketball season

1963–64 Indiana Hoosiers men's basketball
- Conference: Big Ten Conference
- Record: 9–15 (5–9 Big Ten)
- Head coach: Branch McCracken (23rd season)
- Assistant coaches: Lou Watson; Don Luft
- Captain: Jon McGlocklin
- Home arena: New Fieldhouse

1963–64 Big Ten Conference men's basketball standings
	Conf.				Overall
Team	W		L	PCT	W		L	PCT
No. 2 Michigan	11	–	3	.786	23	–	5	.821
Ohio State	11	–	3	.786	16	–	8	.667
Minnesota	10	–	4	.714	17	–	7	.708
Michigan State	8	–	6	.571	14	–	10	.583
Purdue	8	–	6	.571	12	–	12	.500
Illinois	6	–	8	.429	13	–	11	.542
Northwestern	6	–	8	.429	8	–	13	.381
Indiana	5	–	9	.357	9	–	15	.375
Iowa	3	–	11	.214	8	–	15	.348
Wisconsin	2	–	12	.143	8	–	16	.333
Rankings from AP Poll

The 1963–64 Indiana Hoosiers men's basketball team represented Indiana University. Their head coach was Branch McCracken, who was in his 23rd year. The team played its home games in New Fieldhouse in Bloomington, Indiana, and was a member of the Big Ten Conference.

The Hoosiers finished the regular season with an overall record of 15–9 and a conference record of 5–9, finishing 8th in the Big Ten Conference. Indiana was not invited to participate in any postseason tournament.

== Roster ==
No.	Name	Position	Ht.	Year	Hometown
20	Jack Campbell	F	6–5	So.	East Gary, Indiana
23	Al Harden	G	5–10	Jr.	Covington, Indiana
24	Vern Pfaff	G	5–10	So.	Ellettsville, Indiana
25	Tom Van Arsdale	F	6–5	Jr.	Indianapolis, Indiana
30	Dick Van Arsdale	F	6–5	Jr.	Indianapolis, Indiana
31	Jim Sutton	G	5–11	Sr.	Anderson, Indiana
32	Ron Peyser	C	6–8	Jr.	Chicago, Illinois
40	Larry Turpen	G	6–1	So.	Shawswick, Indiana
41	Max Walker	G	6–1	So.	Milwaukee, Wisconsin
42	Ron Pease	F	6–3	Jr.	Muncie, Indiana
43	Gary Grieger	F	6–4	So.	Evansville, Indiana
44	Steve Redenbaugh	G	6–2	Jr.	Paoli, Indiana
45	Larry Cooper	C	6–7	Jr.	Osborne, Kansas
54	Jon McGlocklin	F/C	6–5	Jr.	Franklin, Indiana

== Schedule/results ==
Date time, TV	Rank^{#}	Opponent^{#}	Result	Record	Site city, state
Regular season
11/30/1963*		Southern Illinois	W 80–65	1–0	New Fieldhouse; Bloomington, IN
12/4/1963*		vs. Notre Dame	W 108–102	2–0	Memorial Coliseum; Fort Wayne, IN
12/7/1963*		vs. North Carolina	L 70–77	2–1	Charlotte Stadium; Charlotte, NC
12/9/1963*		Kansas State	L 84–93	2–2	New Fieldhouse; Bloomington, IN
12/14/1963*		Missouri	W 100–76	3–2	New Fieldhouse; Bloomington, IN
12/16/1963*		Detroit	W 110–92	4–2	New Fieldhouse; Bloomington, IN
12/20/1963*		at Oregon State	L 57–70	4–3	Oregon State Coliseum; Corvallis, OR
12/21/1963*		vs. Oregon State	L 52–56	4–4	Memorial Coliseum; Portland, OR
12/31/1963*		at No. 3 Loyola	L 92–105	4–5	Alumni Gym; Chicago, IL
1/4/1964		Iowa	L 71–72	4–6 (0–1)	New Fieldhouse; Bloomington, IN
1/6/1964		at Northwestern	L 65–79	4–7 (0–2)	Welsh-Ryan Arena; Evanston, IL
1/11/1964		at Michigan	L 87–99	4–8 (0–3)	Jenison Fieldhouse; East Lansing, MI
1/27/1964*		at No. 9 DePaul	L 78–85	4–9 (0–3)	Alumni Hall; Chicago, IL
2/1/1964		at Purdue; Rivalry	L 84–87	4–10 (0–4)	Lambert Fieldhouse; West Lafayette, IN
2/3/1964		Illinois; Rivalry	W 104–96	5–10 (1–4)	New Fieldhouse; Bloomington, IN
2/8/1964		Ohio State	L 96–98 ^{OT}	5–11 (1–5)	New Fieldhouse; Bloomington, IN
2/10/1964		at Iowa	L 75–82	5–12 (1–6)	Iowa Field House; Iowa City, IA
2/15/1964		at No. 2 Michigan	L 87–99	5–13 (1–7)	Yost Field House; Ann Arbor, MI
2/17/1964		at Wisconsin	W 82–80 ^{OT}	6–13 (2–7)	Wisconsin Field House; Madison, WI
2/22/1964		Purdue; Rivalry	W 92–79	7–13 (3–7)	New Fieldhouse; Bloomington, IN
2/24/1964		Wisconsin	W 108–82	8–13 (4–7)	New Fieldhouse; Bloomington, IN
2/29/1964		at Ohio State	L 69–73	8–14 (4–8)	St. John Arena; Columbus, OH
3/7/1964		Minnesota	L 89–90	8–15 (4–9)	New Fieldhouse; Bloomington, IN
3/9/1964		Northwestern	W 76–68	9–15 (5–9)	New Fieldhouse; Bloomington, IN
*Non-conference game. ^{#}Rankings from AP Poll. (#) Tournament seedings in parentheses.
