= 1966–67 Wisconsin Badgers men's basketball team =

American college basketball season

1966–67 Wisconsin Badgers men's basketball
- Conference: Big Ten Conference
- Record: 13–11 (8–6 Big Ten)
- Head coach: John Erickson
- Home arena: UW Fieldhouse

1966–67 Big Ten Conference men's basketball standings
| | Conf. | | | | Overall |
| Team | W | | L | PCT | W | | L | PCT |
|---|---|---|---|---|---|---|---|---|
| Michigan State | 10 | – | 4 | .714 | 16 | – | 7 | .696 |
| Indiana | 10 | – | 4 | .714 | 18 | – | 8 | .692 |
| Iowa | 9 | – | 5 | .643 | 16 | – | 8 | .667 |
| Wisconsin | 8 | – | 6 | .571 | 15 | – | 9 | .625 |
| Purdue | 7 | – | 7 | .500 | 15 | – | 9 | .625 |
| Northwestern | 7 | – | 7 | .500 | 11 | – | 11 | .500 |
| Ohio State | 6 | – | 8 | .429 | 13 | – | 11 | .542 |
| Illinois | 6 | – | 8 | .429 | 12 | – | 12 | .500 |
| Minnesota | 5 | – | 9 | .357 | 9 | – | 15 | .375 |
| Michigan | 2 | – | 12 | .143 | 8 | – | 16 | .333 |
Rankings from AP Poll

The 1966–67 Wisconsin Badgers men's basketball team represented University of Wisconsin–Madison in the 1966–67 NCAA Division I men's basketball season as members of the Big Ten Conference. The head coach was John Erickson, coaching his eighth season with the Badgers. The team played their home games at the Wisconsin Field House (commonly known as the UW Fieldhouse) in Madison, Wisconsin. They finished the season 13–11, 8–6 in Big Ten play to finish in fourth place.

== Schedule and results ==
| Date time, TV | Rank^{#} | Opponent^{#} | Result | Record | Site city, state |
Regular season
| 12/03/1966* | | No. 10 Cincinnati | L 70–77 ^{OT} | 0–1 | UW Fieldhouse; Madison, WI |
| 12/10/1966* | | at Bowling Green | L 69–81 | 0–2 | Anderson Arena; Bowling Green, OH |
| 12/13/1966* | | Iowa State | W 80–73 | 1–2 | UW Fieldhouse; Madison, WI |
| 12/16/1966* | | vs. Fordham; Milwaukee Classic | W 67–60 | 2–2 | Milwaukee Arena; Milwaukee, WI |
| 12/17/1966* | | vs. South Carolina; Milwaukee Classic | W 88–84 | 3–2 | Milwaukee Arena; Milwaukee, WI |
| 12/19/1966 | | at Illinois | L 74–87 | 3–3 (0–1) | Assembly Hall; Champaign, IL |
| 12/28/1966* | | vs. No. 1 UCLA; Los Angeles Classic | L 56–100 | 3–4 | Los Angeles Memorial Sports Arena; Los Angeles, CA |
| 12/29/1966* | | vs. Michigan; Los Angeles Classic | L 88–98 | 3–5 | Los Angeles Memorial Sports Arena; Los Angeles, CA |
| 12/30/1966* | | vs. Arizona; Los Angeles Classic | W 104–77 | 4–5 | Los Angeles Memorial Sports Arena; Los Angeles, CA |
| 1/04/1967* | | Marquette | L 60–66 | 4–6 | UW Fieldhouse; Madison, WI |
| 1/07/1967 | | at Purdue | W 79–76 | 5–6 (1–1) | Lambert Fieldhouse; West Lafayette, IN |
| 1/10/1967 | | Michigan | W 98–90 | 6–6 (2–1) | UW Fieldhouse; Madison, WI |
| 1/25/1967* | | South Dakota | W 94–53 | 7–6 | UW Fieldhouse; Madison, WI |
| 1/28/1967 | | at Michigan State | L 61–68 | 7–7 (2–2) | Jenison Fieldhouse; East Lansing, MI |
| 2/04/1967 | | Ohio State | L 84–90 ^{OT} | 7–8 (2–3) | UW Fieldhouse; Madison, WI |
| 2/11/1967 | | at Indiana | L 81–93 | 7–9 (2–4) | New Fieldhouse; Bloomington, IN |
| 2/14/1967 | | Minnesota | W 85–75 | 8–9 (3–4) | UW Fieldhouse; Madison, WI |
| 2/18/1967 | | at Iowa | W 96–95 ^{3OT} | 9–9 (4–4) | Iowa Field House; Iowa City, IA |
| 2/21/1967 | | Northwestern | W 110–94 | 10–9 (5–4) | UW Fieldhouse; Madison, WI |
| 2/25/1967 | | Michigan State | W 68–64 | 11–9 (6–4) | UW Fieldhouse; Madison, WI |
| 2/28/1967 | | at Northwestern | L 82–91 | 11–10 (6–5) | Welsh-Ryan Arena; Evanston, IL |
| 3/04/1967 | | vs. Michigan | W 80–79 | 12–10 (7–5) | Cobo Hall; Detroit, MI |
| 3/07/1967 | | Iowa | L 87–90 ^{OT} | 12–11 (7–6) | UW Fieldhouse; Madison, WI |
| 3/11/1967 | | Illinois | W 102–92 | 13–11 (8–6) | UW Fieldhouse; Madison, WI |
*Non-conference game. ^{#}Rankings from AP Poll. (#) Tournament seedings in parentheses. Source
