= 1966–67 Indiana Hoosiers men's basketball team =

American college basketball season

1966–67 Indiana Hoosiers men's basketball

Big Ten Champions

NCAA Tournament, Regional Third Place
- Conference: Big Ten Conference

Ranking
- Coaches: No. 6
- Record: 18–8 (10–4 Big Ten)
- Head coach: Lou Watson (2nd season)
- Assistant coaches: Don Luft; Tom Bolyard
- Captain: Jack Johnson
- Home arena: New Fieldhouse

1966–67 Big Ten Conference men's basketball standings
	Conf.				Overall
Team	W		L	PCT	W		L	PCT
Michigan State	10	–	4	.714	16	–	7	.696
Indiana	10	–	4	.714	18	–	8	.692
Iowa	9	–	5	.643	16	–	8	.667
Wisconsin	8	–	6	.571	15	–	9	.625
Purdue	7	–	7	.500	15	–	9	.625
Northwestern	7	–	7	.500	11	–	11	.500
Ohio State	6	–	8	.429	13	–	11	.542
Illinois	6	–	8	.429	12	–	12	.500
Minnesota	5	–	9	.357	9	–	15	.375
Michigan	2	–	12	.143	8	–	16	.333
Rankings from AP Poll

The 1966–67 Indiana Hoosiers men's basketball team represented Indiana University as members of the Big Ten Conference. Their head coach was Lou Watson, who was in his second year. The team played its home games in New Fieldhouse in Bloomington, Indiana. The Hoosiers finished the season 18–8, 10–4 in Big Ten play to finish in a tie for first. Indiana was invited to play in the NCAA Tournament. The Hoosiers lost to Virginia Tech in the Mideast Regional semifinals, but beat Tennessee 51–44 in the Regional third-place game.

== Roster ==
No.	Name	Position	Ht.	Year	Hometown
20	Mike Bedree	G	6–3	So.	Fort Wayne, Indiana
21	Harold Curdy	F	6–4	So.	Marion, Indiana
22	Bill Russell	G	6–1	Sr.	Columbus, Indiana
23	Vern Payne	G	5–10	Jr.	Michigan City, Indiana
24	Vern Pfaff	G	5–10	Sr.	Ellettsville, Indiana
25	Ken Newsome	F	6–5	Jr.	Ahoskie, North Carolina
30	Rich Schrumpf	C	6–9	Jr.	Galien, Michigan
31	Bill DeHeer	C	6–9	So.	Maplewood, Missouri
32	Jim Houlihan	G	6–3	Jr.	Bluffton, Indiana
33	Jack Johnson	F	6–6	Sr.	Greenfield, Indiana
34	Butch Joyner	F	6–4	Jr.	New Castle, Indiana
35	Bill Stenberg	C	6–7	So.	Rockford, Illinois
40	Larry Turpen	G	6–1	Sr.	Shawswick, Indiana
41	Gabe Oliverio	G	6–2	So.	Annandale, Virginia
42	Erv Inniger	G	6–3	Sr.	Berne, Indiana
43	John Muirhead	C	6–7	So.	Danville, Illinois
44	Earl Schneider	F	6–9	So.	Evansville, Indiana
45	Gary Leinberger	F	6–7	Jr.	St. Louis, Missouri

== Schedule/results ==
Date time, TV	Rank^{#}	Opponent^{#}	Result	Record	Site city, state
Regular season
12/3/1966*		DePauw	W 84–71	1–0	New Fieldhouse; Bloomington, IN
12/5/1966*		Missouri	W 77–65	2–0	New Fieldhouse; Bloomington, IN
12/7/1966*		Ohio	L 90–91 ^{OT}	2–1	New Fieldhouse; Bloomington, IN
12/12/1966*		at Kansas State	L 69–82	2–2	Ahearn Field House; Manhattan, KS
12/17/1966*		at Loyola (Chicago)	W 83–73	3–2	Alumni Gym; Chicago, IL
12/20/1966*		vs. Notre Dame	W 94–91	4–2	Memorial Coliseum; Fort Wayne, IN
12/27/1966*		vs. Oregon State; Far West Classic	W 71–60	5–2	Memorial Coliseum; Portland, OR
12/29/1966*		vs. Washington; Far West Classic	L 79–81	5–3	Memorial Coliseum; Portland, OR
12/30/1966*		vs. Oregon; Far West Classic	W 102–64	6–3	Memorial Coliseum; Portland, OR
1/7/1967		at Iowa	L 73–84	6–4 (0–1)	Iowa Field House; Iowa City, IA
1/9/1967		Minnesota	W 83–68	7–4 (1–1)	New Fieldhouse; Bloomington, IN
1/14/1967		at Ohio State	W 81–80	8–4 (2–1)	St. John Arena; Columbus, OH
1/30/1967*		DePaul	W 72–70	9–4 (2–1)	New Fieldhouse; Bloomington, IN
2/4/1967		at Minnesota	W 82–81	10–4 (3–1)	Williams Arena; Minneapolis, MN
2/6/1967		Michigan State	W 82–77	11–4 (4–1)	New Fieldhouse; Bloomington, IN
2/11/1967		Wisconsin	W 93–81	12–4 (5–1)	New Fieldhouse; Bloomington, IN
2/13/1967		at Michigan State	L 77–86	12–5 (5–2)	Jenison Fieldhouse; East Lansing, MI
2/18/1967		at Northwestern	W 81–79	13–5 (6–2)	Welsh-Ryan Arena; Evanston, IL
2/20/1967		Illinois; Rivalry	W 96–81	14–5 (7–2)	New Fieldhouse; Bloomington, IN
2/25/1967		Iowa	L 74–75 ^{OT}	14–6 (7–3)	New Fieldhouse; Bloomington, IN
2/27/1967		at Michigan	W 98–96	15–6 (8–3)	Yost Field House; Ann Arbor, MI
3/4/1967		at Illinois; Rivalry	L 70–80	15–7 (8–4)	Assembly Hall; Champaign, IL
3/6/1967		Michigan	W 96–90	16–7 (9–4)	New Fieldhouse; Bloomington, IN
3/11/1967		Purdue; Rivalry	W 95–82	17–7 (10–4)	New Fieldhouse; Bloomington, IN
NCAA Tournament
3/17/1967*		vs. Virginia Tech; Regional semifinals	L 70–79	17–8 (10–4)	Welsh-Ryan Arena; Evanston, IL
3/18/1967*		vs. No. 8 Tennessee; Regional Third Place	W 51–44	18–8 (10–4)	Welsh-Ryan Arena; Evanston, IL
*Non-conference game. ^{#}Rankings from AP Poll. (#) Tournament seedings in parentheses.
