= Pete Elliott =

American football player and coach (1926–2013)

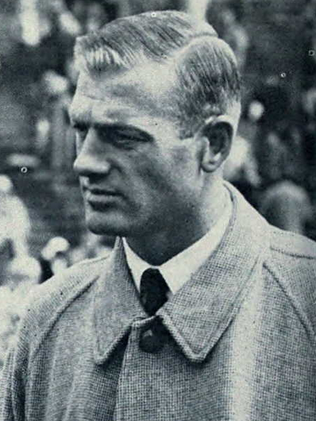
- Elliott at Michigan Stadium in 1960

Biographical details
- Born: September 29, 1926; Bloomington, Illinois, U.S.
- Died: January 4, 2013 (aged 86); Canton, Ohio, U.S.

Playing career

Football
- 1945–1948: Michigan
- Position: Quarterback (football)

Coaching career (HC unless noted)

Football
- 1949–1950: Oregon State (ends)
- 1951–1955: Oklahoma (assistant)
- 1956: Nebraska
- 1957–1959: California
- 1960–1966: Illinois
- 1973–1974: Miami (FL)
- 1978: St. Louis Cardinals (assistant)

Golf
- 1953–1954: Oklahoma

Administrative career (AD unless noted)
- 1974–1978: Miami (FL)
- 1979–1995: Pro Football Hall of Fame (exec. dir.)

Head coaching record
- Overall: 56–72–1
- Bowls: 1–1

Accomplishments and honors

Championships
- As coach: AAWU (1958); Big Ten (1963); As player: National (1948)

Awards
- First-team All-American (1948); First-team All-Big Nine (1948)
- College Football Hall of Fame; Inducted in 1994 (profile)

Peter R. Elliott (September 29, 1926 – January 4, 2013) was an American football player and coach. Elliott served as the head football coach at the University of Nebraska–Lincoln (1956), the University of California, Berkeley (1957–1959), the University of Illinois at Urbana-Champaign (1960–1966), and the University of Miami (1973–1974), compiling a career college football record of 56–72–11. From 1979 to 1996, Elliott served as executive director of the Pro Football Hall of Fame.

== College ==
Elliott was an All-American quarterback on the undefeated 1948 Michigan Wolverines football team that won a national championship. He was also a standout basketball player who was first-team All-Big Ten Conference in 1948 and second-team All-Big Ten in 1949 as well as team MVP in 1948. The 1948 team finished third in the eastern region of the NCAA Men's Division I Basketball Championship. Elliott is the only Michigan athlete to have earned 12 letters in varsity sports: football, basketball, and golf.

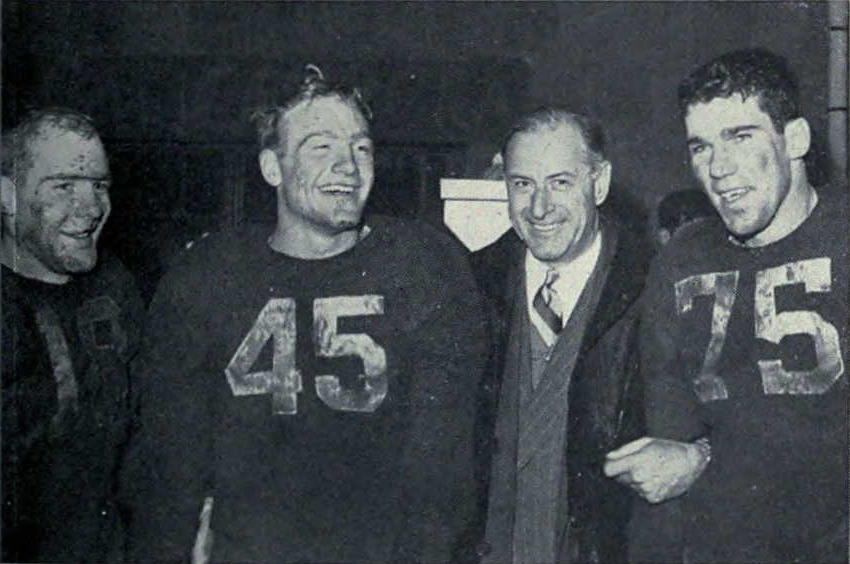
Bump Elliott, Pete (No. 45), Fritz Crisler and Bruce Hilkene (No. 75) celebrate 1947 Big 9 championship after defeating Wisconsin.

At Michigan, Elliott played football with his brother Bump, who also became a well known college coach.

== Coaching career ==
After college, Elliot served as an assistant football coach at Oregon State University from 1949 to 1950 and the University of Oklahoma from 1951 to 1955. He was the golf coach at Oklahoma. In 1956, he took the head football coaching job at Nebraska, lasting one year with a record of 4–6. The next year, he took over at California, where he remained until 1959 with a compiled record of 10–21. In 1958, he led the Golden Bears to an AAWU title and an appearance in the Rose Bowl, where they lost to Iowa.

In 1960, Elliott succeeded Ray Eliot at Illinois and was at the school until 1966. With the Illini, his record was 31–34–1, earning a Big Ten title and Rose Bowl victory over Washington during the 1963 season. He, along with basketball coaches Harry Combes and Howie Braun, was pressured into resigning on March 19, 1967, by the university which was threatened with expulsion by the Big Ten Conference over a slush fund scandal. In 1973, he became head coach at Miami, where he remained for two years and compiled an 11–11 record.

== Later life ==
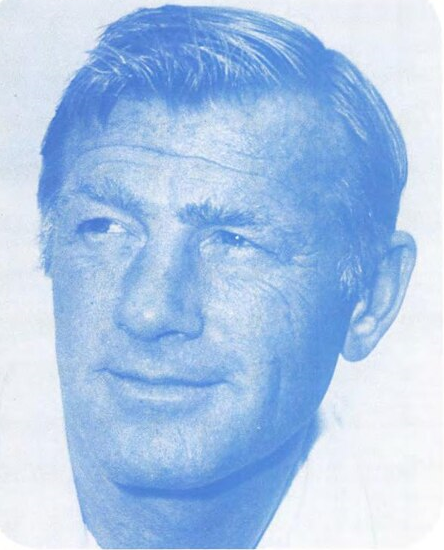
Elliott at the University of Miami, c. 1976

Elliott served as athletic director at Miami from 1973 to 1978. In March 1978, Elliott rejoined his former boss, Bud Wilkinson, as an assistant with the NFL St. Louis Cardinals. Elliott served as executive director of the Pro Football Hall of Fame from 1979 to 1996 and was serving on its board of trustees. Elliott was also a member of the Sigma Chi fraternity and was selected as a Significant Sig.

Elliott died at the age of 86 of congestive heart failure on January 4, 2013, in Canton, Ohio.

== Head coaching record ==
Year	Team	Overall	Conference	Standing	Bowl/playoffs	Coaches^{#}	AP^{°}
Nebraska Cornhuskers (Big Seven Conference) (1956)
1956	Nebraska	4–6	3–3	4th			
Nebraska:		4–6	3–3				
California Golden Bears (Pacific Coast Conference) (1957–1958)
1957	California	1–9	1–6	7th			
1958	California	7–4	6–1	1st	L Rose	16	16
California Golden Bears (Athletic Association of Western Universities) (1959)
1959	California	2–8	1–3	4th			
California:		10–21	8–10				
Illinois Fighting Illini (Big Ten Conference) (1961–1966)
1960	Illinois	5–4	3–4	T–5th			
1961	Illinois	0–9	0–7	10th			
1962	Illinois	2–7	2–5	8th		18	
1963	Illinois	8–1–1	5–1–1	1st	W Rose	4	3
1964	Illinois	6–3	4–3	T–4th		16	
1965	Illinois	6–4	4–3	5th			
1966	Illinois	4–6	4–3	T–3rd			
Illinois:		31–34–1	22–26–1				
Miami Hurricanes (NCAA Division I independent) (1973–1974)
1973	Miami	5–6					
1974	Miami	6–5					
Miami:		11–11					
Total:		56–72–1					
National championship Conference title Conference division title or championship game berth
^{#}Rankings from final Coaches Poll.; ^{°}Rankings from final AP Poll.

== See also ==
- University of Michigan Athletic Hall of Honor
