= 1956–57 Michigan State Spartans men's basketball team =

American college basketball season

1956–57 Michigan State Spartans men's basketball

Big Ten co-champions

NCAA tournament, Final Four
- Conference: Big Ten Conference

Ranking
- Coaches: No. 7
- AP: No. 11
- Record: 16–10 (10–4 Big Ten)
- Head coach: Forrest "Forddy" Anderson (3rd season)
- Assistant coaches: Bob Stevens (3rd season); Clarence "Sonny" Means (1st season)
- Captain: George Ferguson
- Home arena: Jenison Field House

1956–57 Big Ten Conference men's basketball standings
	Conf.				Overall
Team	W		L	PCT	W		L	PCT
Indiana	10	–	4	.714	14	–	8	.636
No. 11 Michigan State	10	–	4	.714	16	–	10	.615
Minnesota	9	–	5	.643	14	–	8	.636
Ohio State	9	–	5	.643	14	–	8	.636
Purdue	8	–	6	.571	15	–	7	.682
Michigan	8	–	6	.571	13	–	9	.591
Illinois	7	–	7	.500	14	–	8	.636
Iowa	4	–	10	.286	8	–	14	.364
Wisconsin	3	–	11	.214	5	–	17	.227
Northwestern	2	–	12	.143	6	–	16	.273
Rankings from AP Poll

The 1956–57 Michigan State Spartans men's basketball team represented Michigan State University in the 1956–57 NCAA Division I men's basketball season. The team played their home games at Jenison Field House in East Lansing, Michigan and were members of the Big Ten Conference. They were coached by Forrest "Forddy" Anderson in his third year at Michigan State. The Spartans finished the season with a record of 16–10, 10–4 to win a share of the Big Ten Championship. They received the conference's bid to the NCAA tournament where they beat Notre Dame and Kentucky to advance to the Final Four. There they lost to eventual champion North Carolina. They lost to San Francisco in the third-place game.

== Previous season ==
The Spartans finished the 1955–56 season with an overall record of 13–9, 7–7 to finish in fifth place in Big Ten play.

== Season summary ==
Johnny Green led MSU in rebounding at 14.6 a game and Jack Quiggle led in scoring at 15.3 points per game. Green and Quiggle were both named first team All-Big Ten.

After starting the season 4–3, Green joined the Spartans after he was discharged from the Marines. In his first four games with the Spartans, MSU lost all four games. However, the Spartans won their next 10 games before a loss in the regular-season finale to Michigan. The loss cost the Spartans an out-right championship, but they still earned their first trip to the NCAA tournament as the Big Ten representative to the NCAA Mideast Region.

In the NCAA Mideast Regional on Kentucky's campus, the No. 11-ranked Spartans played two games at 10,000-seat Memorial Coliseum: MSU avenged an earlier loss to No. 17 Notre Dame in the semifinal winning 85–83. In the final, the Spartans upset No. 3 Kentucky 80–68 to earn the school's first trip to the Final Four.

In the national semifinal, the Spartans faced No. 1 North Carolina. In a game that would be referred to as one of the greatest games in college basketball history, the lead changed 31 times. Quiggle made a half-court shot after regulation expired that would have won the game for the Spartans, but was ruled too late. Green missed a free throw at the end of the first overtime that also would have sealed the win for the Spartans. North Carolina's Pete Brennan made a basket as time expired to force a second overtime. Lennie Rosenbluth took over the Tar Heels in the third overtime as they eliminated the Spartans from championship contention.

MSU lost to San Francisco in the third-place game the following day.

== Roster and statistics ==
1955–56 Michigan State Spartans men's basketball team
No	Name	Pos	Year	Height	Pts	Reb
11	Harry Lux	G	SR	5–10	0.9	0.9
12	David Scott	G	SO	6–2	3.5	1.8
14	Jim Stouffer	G	SO	6–0	0.5	
20	Tom Rand	G	SO	6–2	0.6	0.9
21	Jack Quiggle	G	JR	6–3	15.3	5.6
22	Joe Reading	F	JR	6–5		
23	Bob Anderegg	F	SO	6–3	8.5	5.0
24	Johnny Green	C	SO	6–5	13.2	14.6
25	Larry Jennings	C	SO	6–5	0.0	
30	George Ferguson	F	SR	6–3	13.1	5.8
31	Charles Bencie	F	JR	6–6	5.5	3.6
32	Gary Siegmeier	C	SO	6–5	0.5	0.2
33	Larry Hedden	F	JR	6–5	14.3	7.8
34	Tom Markovich	F	SO	6–3	1.1	0.7
35	Pat Wison	G	SR	6–0	4.2	2.8
	Ralph Andreson					
	Don Arend					
	Larry Jennings	G		6–5		
	Warren Marazita					
	Joe Reading	F		6–5		
	John Russell	F		6–1		

== Schedule and results ==
Date time, TV	Rank^{#}	Opponent^{#}	Result	Record	Site city, state
Regular season
Dec 1, 1956*		Iowa State	L 53–60	0–1	Jenison Field House; East Lansing, MI
Dec 8, 1956*		Brigham Young	W 79–61	1–1	Jenison Field House; East Lansing, MI
Dec 17, 1956*		at Butler	L 79–83	1–2	Hinkle Fieldhouse; Indianapolis, IN
Dec 22, 1956*		Marquette	W 92–65	2–2	Jenison Field House; East Lansing, MI
Dec 27, 1956*		vs. Nebraska; Big Seven Classic quarterfinals	W 79–65	3–2	Municipal Auditorium; Kansas City, MO
Dec 28, 1956*		vs. Colorado; Big Seven Classic semifinals	L 87–90	3–3	Municipal Auditorium; Kansas City, MO
Dec 29, 1956*		vs. Oklahoma; Big Seven Classic third-place game	W 76–74 ^{OT}	4–3	Municipal Auditorium; Kansas City, MO
Jan 5, 1957		Purdue	L 71–72	4–4 (0–1)	Jenison Field House; East Lansing, MI
Jan 7, 1957		Michigan; Rivalry	L 69–70	4–5 (0–2)	Jenison Field House; East Lansing, MI
Jan 15, 1957*		Notre Dame	L 76–86	4–6	Notre Dame Fieldhouse; South Bend, IN
Jan 19, 1957		at No. 17 Ohio State	L 51–70	4–7 (0–3)	St. John Arena; Columbus, OH
Jan 26, 1957		at Minnesota	W 72–59	5–7 (1–3)	Williams Arena; Minneapolis, MN
Jan 28, 1957		No. 12 Ohio State	W 73–64	6–7 (2–3)	Jenison Field House; East Lansing, MI
Feb 2, 1957		at Northwestern	W 77–63	7–7 (3–3)	Welsh-Ryan Arena; Evanston, IL
Feb 9, 1957		No. 15 Illinois	W 70–64	8–7 (4–3)	Jenison Field House; East Lansing, MI
Feb 11, 1957		at No. 17 Purdue	W 68–66	9–7 (5–3)	Lambert Fieldhouse; West Lafayette, IN
Feb 16, 1957		Iowa	W 77–67	10–7 (6–3)	Jenison Field House; East Lansing, MI
Feb 18, 1957		at No. 16 Illinois	W 89–83	11–7 (7–3)	Huff Hall; Champaign, IL
Feb 23, 1957		Minnesota	W 70–65	12–7 (8–3)	Jenison Field House; East Lansing, MI
Feb 25, 1957		at Wisconsin	W 78–62	13–7 (9–3)	Wisconsin Field House; Madison, WI
Mar 2, 1957		No. 10 Indiana	W 76–61	14–7 (10–3)	Jenison Field House; East Lansing, MI
Mar 4, 1957		Michigan; Rivalry	L 72–81	14–8 (10–4)	Yost Field House; Ann Arbor, MI
NCAA Tournament
Mar 15, 1957*	No. 8	vs. No. 17 Notre Dame; Region semifinals	W 85–83	15–8	Memorial Coliseum; Lexington, KY
Mar 16, 1957*	No. 8	vs. No. 3 Kentucky; Region finals	W 80–68	16–8	Memorial Coliseum; Lexington, KY
Mar 22, 1957*	No. 8	vs. No. 1 North Carolina; Final Four	L 70–74 ^{3OT}	16–9	Municipal Auditorium; Kansas City, MO
Mar 23, 1957*	No. 8	vs. San Francisco; National third-place game	L 60–64	16–10	Municipal Auditorium; Kansas City, MO
*Non-conference game. ^{#}Rankings from AP Poll,. (#) Tournament seedings in parentheses. All times are in Central Time; Source.

== Rankings ==
Ranking movements Legend: ██ Increase in ranking ██ Decrease in ranking — = Not ranked
	Week											
Poll	Pre	1	2	3	4	5	6	7	8	9	10	Final
AP	—	—	—	—	—	—	—	—	—	—	8	11
