= 1966–67 Michigan State Spartans men's basketball team =

American college basketball season

1966–67 Michigan State Spartans men's basketball

Big Ten Champions
- Conference: Big Ten Conference
- Record: 16–7 (10–4 Big Ten)
- Head coach: John E. Benington (2nd season)
- Assistant coaches: Robert Nordmann; Gus Ganakas
- Captain: Matthew Aitch
- Home arena: Jenison Fieldhouse

1966–67 Big Ten Conference men's basketball standings
	Conf.				Overall
Team	W		L	PCT	W		L	PCT
Michigan State	10	–	4	.714	16	–	7	.696
Indiana	10	–	4	.714	18	–	8	.692
Iowa	9	–	5	.643	16	–	8	.667
Wisconsin	8	–	6	.571	15	–	9	.625
Purdue	7	–	7	.500	15	–	9	.625
Northwestern	7	–	7	.500	11	–	11	.500
Ohio State	6	–	8	.429	13	–	11	.542
Illinois	6	–	8	.429	12	–	12	.500
Minnesota	5	–	9	.357	9	–	15	.375
Michigan	2	–	12	.143	8	–	16	.333
Rankings from AP Poll

The 1966–67 Michigan State Spartans men's basketball team represented Michigan State University in the 1966–67 NCAA Division I men's basketball season as members of the Big Ten Conference. They played their home games at Jenison Fieldhouse in East Lansing, Michigan and were coached by John E. Benington in his second year as head coach of the Spartans. They finished the season 16–7, 10–4 in Big Ten play to finish tied for the Big Ten championship. However, Indiana was selected for the NCAA tournament.

== Previous season ==
The Spartans finished the 1965–66 season 16–7, 10–4 in Big Ten play to finish in second place.

== Roster and statistics ==
1966–67 Michigan State Spartans men's basketball team
No	Name	Pos	Year	Height	Pts	Reb
11	John Gorman	G	SR	5–11	1.0	1.0
12	John Bailey	G	JR	6–0	8.0	2.5
13	Edward "Ted" Cary	F	ST	6–5	2.1	2.2
14	Richie Jordan	G	SO	5–7	2.2	1.1
15	Steven Rymal	G	JR	6–1	11.4	4.7
21	James O'Brien	G	JR	6–3	0.6	–
22	Richard Chappel	G	SO	5–10	0.0	0.5
23	Vernon Johnson	G	SO	5–11	1.5	0.5
24	John Holms	F	SO	6–4	4.2	3.8
31	Shannon Reading	G	SR	6–0	5.4	1.5
32	Jack Wynn	C	JR	6–7	–	–
33	Heywood Edwards	F	JR	6–5	7.4	5.7
34	Tom Lick	C	SO	6–10	0.7	1.8
35	Lee Lafayette	F	SO	6–6	14.8	9.7
41	Arthur Baylor	F	JR	6–6	5.1	5.1
42	Gerald Geistler	C	JR	6–8	1.0	2.3
44	David Keeler	F	SR	6–6	1.3	2.0
45	Matthew Atich	C	SR	6–7	16.3	9.2

== Schedule and results ==
Date time, TV	Rank^{#}	Opponent^{#}	Result	Record	Site city, state
Regular season
Dec 1, 1966*		Western Michigan	W 77–55	1–0	Jenison Fieldhouse; East Lansing, MI
Dec 3, 1966*		Miami (Ohio)	W 63–51	2–0	Jenison Fieldhouse; East Lansing, MI
Dec 5, 1966*		South Dakota	W 81–54	3–0	Jenison Fieldhouse; East Lansing, MI
Dec 5, 1966*		Wichita State	W 103–68	4–0	Jenison Fieldhouse; East Lansing, MI
Dec 20, 1966*	No. 5	at Loyola (LA); Sugar Bowl Tournament	L 70–74	4–1	The Field House; New Orleans, LA
Dec 21, 1966*	No. 5	at Tulane; Sugar Bowl Tournament	W 76–66	5–1	Avron B. Fogelman Arena; New Orleans, LA
Dec 27, 1966*	No. 10	vs. Villanova; Quaker City Tournament	L 63–66	5–2	The Palestra; Philadelphia, PA
Dec 28, 1966*	No. 10	vs. Bowling Green; Quaker City Tournament	L 67–75	5–3	The Palestra; Philadelphia, PA
Jan 7, 1967		at Illinois	W 76–74	6–3 (1–0)	Assembly Hall; Champaign, IL
Jan 14, 1967		Iowa	W 79–70	7–3 (2–0)	Jenison Fieldhouse; East Lansing, MI
Jan 21, 1967		at Michigan; Rivalry	L 59–81	7–4 (2–1)	Yost Field House; Ann Arbor, MI
Jan 28, 1967		Wisconsin	W 68–61	8–4 (3–1)	Jenison Fieldhouse; East Lansing, MI
Feb 1, 1967*		at Notre Dame	W 85–80 ^{OT}	9–4	Notre Dame Fieldhouse; South Bend, IN
Feb 6, 1967		at Indiana	L 77–82	9–5 (3–2)	Gladstein Fieldhouse; Bloomington, IN
Feb 11, 1967		at Purdue	W 79–77	10–5 (4–2)	Lambert Fieldhouse; West Lafayette, IN
Feb 13, 1967		Indiana	W 86–77	11–5 (5–2)	Jenison Fieldhouse; East Lansing, MI
Feb 18, 1967		Minnesota	W 67–66	12–5 (6–2)	Jenison Fieldhouse; East Lansing, MI
Feb 20, 1967		at Ohio State	L 64–80	12–6 (6–3)	St. John Arena; Columbus, OH
Feb 25, 1967		at Wisconsin	L 64–68	12–7 (6–4)	Wisconsin Field House; Madison, WI
Feb 27, 1967		Ohio State	W 74–63	13–7 (7–4)	Jenison Fieldhouse; East Lansing, MI
Mar 4, 1967		Purdue	W 75–71	14–7 (8–4)	Jenison Fieldhouse; East Lansing, MI
Mar 6, 1967		at Minnesota	W 67–59	15–7 (9–4)	Williams Arena; Minneapolis, MN
Mar 11, 1967		Northwestern	W 79–65	16–7 (10–4)	Jenison Fieldhouse; East Lansing, MI
*Non-conference game. ^{#}Rankings from AP Poll. (#) Tournament seedings in parentheses. Source
