= 1956–57 Michigan Wolverines men's basketball team =

American college basketball season

1956–57 Michigan Wolverines men's basketball
- Conference: Big Ten Conference
- Record: 13–9 (8–6 Big Ten)
- Head coach: William Perigo
- Assistant coaches: Dave Strack; Matt Patanelli
- MVP: Ron Kramer
- Captain: Ron Kramer
- Home arena: Fielding H. Yost Field House

1956–57 Big Ten Conference men's basketball standings
	Conf.				Overall
Team	W		L	PCT	W		L	PCT
Indiana	10	–	4	.714	14	–	8	.636
No. 11 Michigan State	10	–	4	.714	16	–	10	.615
Minnesota	9	–	5	.643	14	–	8	.636
Ohio State	9	–	5	.643	14	–	8	.636
Purdue	8	–	6	.571	15	–	7	.682
Michigan	8	–	6	.571	13	–	9	.591
Illinois	7	–	7	.500	14	–	8	.636
Iowa	4	–	10	.286	8	–	14	.364
Wisconsin	3	–	11	.214	5	–	17	.227
Northwestern	2	–	12	.143	6	–	16	.273
Rankings from AP Poll

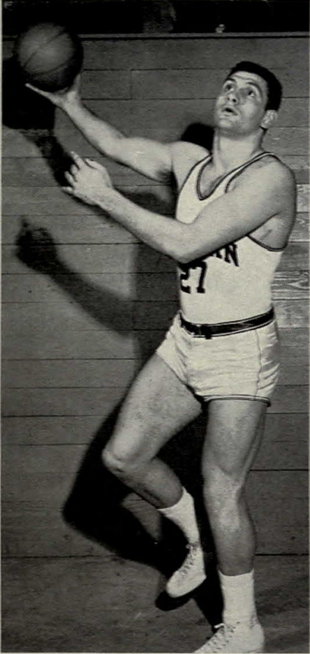
Ron Kramer

The 1956–57 Michigan Wolverines men's basketball team represented the University of Michigan in intercollegiate college basketball during the 1956–57 NCAA University Division men's basketball season. The team played its home games at Fielding H. Yost Field House (renamed Yost Ice Arena in 1973) on the school's campus in Ann Arbor, Michigan. Under the direction of head coach William Perigo, the team finished tied for fifth in the Big Ten Conference.

Future College Football Hall of Famer Ron Kramer established the school career scoring record with 1,119. The record last until 1961, when John Tidwell totaled 1386. Kramer served as team captain and earned team MVP for the third year in a row.

== Team players drafted into the NBA ==
Five players from this team were selected in the NBA draft. Ferguson accumulated no statistics. Kramer was a first round selection of the Green Bay Packers in the 1957 NFL draft (fourth overall pick) and played in the NFL through the 1967 season.

Year	Round	Pick	Overall	Player	NBA Club
1957	5	2	34	Ron Kramer	Detroit Pistons
1957	7	3	51	George Ferguson	Minneapolis Lakers
1958	7	6	53	Pete Tillotson	Syracuse Nationals
1959	4	2	24	George Lee	Detroit Pistons
1959	11	2	73	M. C. Burton	Detroit Pistons
