= 1963–64 Wisconsin Badgers men's basketball team =

American college basketball season

1963–64 Wisconsin Badgers men's basketball
- Conference: Big Ten Conference
- Record: 8–16 (2–12 Big Ten)
- Head coach: John Erickson
- Home arena: UW Fieldhouse

1963–64 Big Ten Conference men's basketball standings
	Conf.				Overall
Team	W		L	PCT	W		L	PCT
No. 2 Michigan	11	–	3	.786	23	–	5	.821
Ohio State	11	–	3	.786	16	–	8	.667
Minnesota	10	–	4	.714	17	–	7	.708
Michigan State	8	–	6	.571	14	–	10	.583
Purdue	8	–	6	.571	12	–	12	.500
Illinois	6	–	8	.429	13	–	11	.542
Northwestern	6	–	8	.429	8	–	13	.381
Indiana	5	–	9	.357	9	–	15	.375
Iowa	3	–	11	.214	8	–	15	.348
Wisconsin	2	–	12	.143	8	–	16	.333
Rankings from AP Poll

The 1963–64 Wisconsin Badgers men's basketball team represented University of Wisconsin–Madison. The head coach was John Erickson, coaching his fifth season with the Badgers. The team played their home games at the UW Fieldhouse in Madison, Wisconsin and was a member of the Big Ten Conference.

== Schedule ==
Date time, TV	Rank^{#}	Opponent^{#}	Result	Record	Site city, state
Regular Season
12/02/1963*		Kent State	W 88–77	1–0	UW Fieldhouse; Madison, WI
12/07/1963*		Ohio	L 76–77	1–1	UW Fieldhouse; Madison, WI
12/10/1963*		Pittsburgh	W 85–83	2–1	UW Fieldhouse; Madison, WI
12/14/1963*		at No. 6 Cincinnati	L 60–65	2–2	Armory Fieldhouse; Cincinnati, OH
12/17/1963*		Gonzaga	W 115–71	3–2	UW Fieldhouse; Madison, WI
12/20/1963*		vs. Kentucky; Kentucky Invitational	L 85–108	3–3	Memorial Coliseum; Lexington, KY
12/21/1963*		vs. Princeton; Kentucky Invitational	L 87–90 ^{OT}	3–4	Memorial Coliseum; Lexington, KY
12/27/1963*		vs. Dartmouth; Milwaukee Classic	W 94–68	4–4	Milwaukee Arena; Milwaukee, WI
12/28/1963*		vs. Georgia Tech; Milwaukee Classic	W 104–84	5–4	Milwaukee Arena; Milwaukee, WI
1/04/1964		No. 8 Ohio State	L 85–101	5–5 (0–1)	UW Fieldhouse; Madison, WI
1/06/1964		at Michigan State	L 90–106	5–6 (0–2)	Jenison Fieldhouse; East Lansing, MI
1/11/1964		at Northwestern	L 63–76	5–7 (0–3)	Welsh-Ryan Arena; Evanston, IL
1/13/1964		Iowa	W 79–61	6–7 (1–3)	UW Fieldhouse; Madison, WI
1/28/1964*		at Marquette	W 72–68	7–7	Marquette Gymnasium; Milwaukee, WI
2/01/1964		at Minnesota	L 92–111	7–8 (1–4)	Williams Arena; Minneapolis, MN
2/08/1964		Purdue	W 81–80	8–8 (2–4)	UW Fieldhouse; Madison, WI
2/11/1964		Northwestern	L 64–72	8–9 (2–5)	UW Fieldhouse; Madison, WI
2/15/1964		at Ohio State	L 74–92	8–10 (2–6)	St. John Arena; Columbus, OH
2/17/1964		Indiana	L 80–82 ^{2OT}	8–11 (2–7)	UW Fieldhouse; Madison, WI
2/22/1964		No. 2 Michigan	L 59–103	8–12 (2–8)	UW Fieldhouse; Madison, WI
2/24/1964		at Indiana	L 82–108	8–13 (2–9)	New Fieldhouse; Bloomington, IN
2/29/1964		at Purdue	L 83–97	8–14 (2–10)	Lambert Fieldhouse; West Lafayette, IN
3/02/1964		Minnesota	L 96–105	8–15 (2–11)	UW Fieldhouse; Madison, WI
3/07/1964		at Illinois	L 73–97	8–16 (2–12)	Assembly Hall; Champaign, IL
*Non-conference game. ^{#}Rankings from AP Poll. (#) Tournament seedings in parentheses.
