= Cyril Pinder =

American football player (1946–2021)

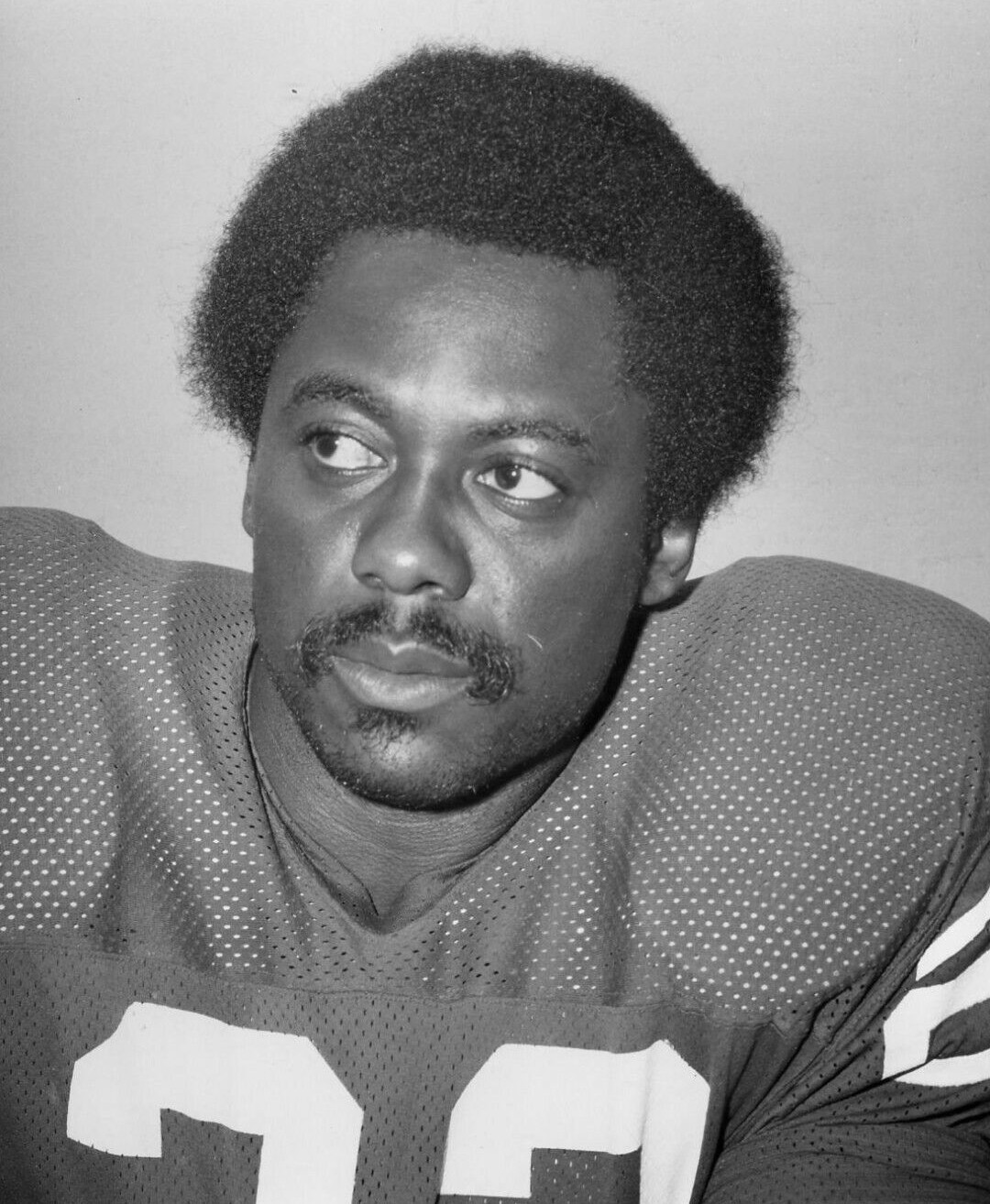
- Pinder, circa 1971

No. 22, 33
- Position: Running back

Personal information
- Born: November 13, 1946; Fort Lauderdale, Florida, U.S.
- Died: January 22, 2021 (aged 74); Urbana, Illinois, U.S.
- Listed height: 6 ft 2 in (1.88 m)
- Listed weight: 210 lb (95 kg)

Career information
- High school: Crispus Attucks (Hollywood, Florida)
- College: Illinois
- NFL draft: 1968: 2nd round, 39th overall pick

Career history
- Philadelphia Eagles (1968–1970); Chicago Bears (1971–1972); Dallas Cowboys (1973); Chicago Fire (1974); Chicago Winds (1975)

Career NFL statistics
- Rushing yards: 1,709
- Rushing average: 4
- Receptions: 67
- Receiving yards: 556
- Total touchdowns: 7
- Stats at Pro Football Reference

Cyril Calvin Pinder (November 13, 1946 – January 22, 2021) was an American professional football player who was a running back in the National Football League (NFL) for the Philadelphia Eagles, Chicago Bears, and Dallas Cowboys. He played college football for the Illinois Fighting Illini.

== Early life ==
Pinder attended Crispus Attucks High School in Hollywood, Florida, where he began playing football as a junior. He was an All-state selection at both football and basketball. He also practiced track.

He accepted a scholarship from the University of Illinois. During his junior year with the Fighting Illini, he was declared permanently ineligible by the Big Ten Conference on March 4, 1967, for having more than US $500 in expenses per year paid for by money from a slush fund set up by the university's athletic department. He finished his college career with 92 carries for 434 yards and 5 touchdowns. He also was an indoor sprint champion.

== Professional career ==
=== Philadelphia Eagles ===
Pinder was selected by the Philadelphia Eagles in the second round (39th overall) of the 1968 NFL draft, to replace running back Timmy Brown. In 1970, he became the team leading rusher with 166 carries for 657 yards and 2 touchdowns. On September 13, 1971, after having a difficult contract negotiation, he was traded to the Chicago Bears in exchange for a 1972 second round (#37-Dan Yochum) and a 1973 fourth round selection (#83-Gery Palmer).

=== Chicago Bears ===
In 1971, he was acquired by the Chicago Bears for depth purposes while Gale Sayers was recovering from his career-threatening right knee injury. He was cut on September 10, 1973.

=== Dallas Cowboys ===
On September 28, 1973, he was signed by the Dallas Cowboys to replace running back Bill Thomas. He spent his time between the active roster and the taxi squad, before being cut at the end of the 1973 season.

=== Chicago Fire (WFL) ===
In June, 1974, he was signed by the Chicago Fire of the World Football League. He was named the team's starter at running back and registered 925 rushing yards and 8 touchdowns.

=== Chicago Winds (WFL) ===
In 1975, the Chicago Winds replaced the Fire in the World Football League. Pinder was signed on June 24, though the new team was evicted from the league after just five games.

== Personal life ==
After football, he worked as an investment banker for ten years. He also worked for WLS-TV in Chicago. Pinder died on January 22, 2021, at the age of 74. He is one of at least 345 NFL players to be diagnosed after death with chronic traumatic encephalopathy (CTE), which is caused by repeated hits to the head.
