= 1956–57 Wisconsin Badgers men's basketball team =

American college basketball season

1956–57 Wisconsin Badgers men's basketball
- Conference: Big Ten Conference
- Record: 5–17 (3–11 Big Ten)
- Head coach: Harold E. Foster
- Home arena: UW Fieldhouse

1956–57 Big Ten Conference men's basketball standings
| | Conf. | | | | Overall |
| Team | W | | L | PCT | W | | L | PCT |
|---|---|---|---|---|---|---|---|---|
| Indiana | 10 | – | 4 | .714 | 14 | – | 8 | .636 |
| No. 11 Michigan State | 10 | – | 4 | .714 | 16 | – | 10 | .615 |
| Minnesota | 9 | – | 5 | .643 | 14 | – | 8 | .636 |
| Ohio State | 9 | – | 5 | .643 | 14 | – | 8 | .636 |
| Purdue | 8 | – | 6 | .571 | 15 | – | 7 | .682 |
| Michigan | 8 | – | 6 | .571 | 13 | – | 9 | .591 |
| Illinois | 7 | – | 7 | .500 | 14 | – | 8 | .636 |
| Iowa | 4 | – | 10 | .286 | 8 | – | 14 | .364 |
| Wisconsin | 3 | – | 11 | .214 | 5 | – | 17 | .227 |
| Northwestern | 2 | – | 12 | .143 | 6 | – | 16 | .273 |
Rankings from AP Poll

The 1956–57 Wisconsin Badgers men's basketball team represented University of Wisconsin–Madison. The head coach was Harold E. Foster, coaching his twentythird season with the Badgers. The team played their home games at the UW Fieldhouse in Madison, Wisconsin and was a member of the Big Ten Conference.

== Schedule ==
| Date time, TV | Rank^{#} | Opponent^{#} | Result | Record | Site city, state |
Regular Season
| 12/01/1956* | | South Dakota | L 56–58 ^{OT} | 0–1 | UW Fieldhouse; Madison, WI |
| 12/03/1956* | | at Butler | L 50–54 | 0–2 | Butler Fieldhouse; Indianapolis, IN |
| 12/08/1956* | | Notre Dame | L 55–75 | 0–3 | UW Fieldhouse; Madison, WI |
| 12/10/1956* | | at Nebraska | L 51–53 | 0–4 | Nebraska Coliseum; Lincoln, NE |
| 12/15/1956* | | Washington U. (MO) | W 41–38 | 1–4 | UW Fieldhouse; Madison, WI |
| 12/20/1956* | | at Bradley | L 62–74 | 1–5 | Robertson Memorial Field House; Peoria, IL |
| 12/22/1956* | | at No. 1 Kansas | L 62–83 | 1–6 | Allen Fieldhouse; Lawrence, KS |
| 12/29/1956* | | Yale | W 64–46 | 2–6 | UW Fieldhouse; Madison, WI |
| 1/05/1957 | | at Northwestern | L 54–75 | 2–7 (0–1) | Welsh-Ryan Arena; Evanston, IL |
| 1/07/1957 | | at Indiana | L 68–79 | 2–8 (0–2) | The Fieldhouse; Bloomington, IN |
| 1/12/1957 | | No. 10 Illinois | L 63–79 | 2–9 (0–3) | UW Fieldhouse; Madison, WI |
| 1/14/1957 | | at Michigan | L 62–71 | 2–10 (0–4) | Yost Fieldhouse; Ann Arbor, MI |
| 1/19/1957 | | Iowa | L 47–70 | 2–11 (0–5) | UW Fieldhouse; Madison, WI |
| 1/21/1957 | | Ohio State | L 64–67 | 2–12 (0–6) | UW Fieldhouse; Madison, WI |
| 2/11/1957 | | Michigan | W 70–65 | 3–12 (1–6) | UW Fieldhouse; Madison, WI |
| 2/16/1957 | | at Ohio State | L 50–63 | 3–13 (1–7) | St. John Arena; Columbus, OH |
| 2/18/1957 | | at Minnesota | L 53–85 | 3–14 (1–8) | Williams Arena; Minneapolis, MN |
| 2/23/1957 | | No. 11 Indiana | L 74–85 | 3–15 (1–9) | UW Fieldhouse; Madison, WI |
| 2/25/1957 | | Michigan State | L 62–78 | 3–16 (1–10) | UW Fieldhouse; Madison, WI |
| 3/02/1957 | | at Purdue | L 66–85 | 3–17 (1–11) | Lambert Fieldhouse; West Lafayette, IN |
| 3/04/1957 | | Northwestern | W 82–69 | 4–17 (2–11) | UW Fieldhouse; Madison, WI |
| 3/09/1957 | | at Iowa | W 60–59 | 5–17 (3–11) | Iowa Field House; Iowa City, IA |
*Non-conference game. ^{#}Rankings from AP Poll. (#) Tournament seedings in parentheses.
