= Bob Anderegg =

American basketball player (1937–2024)

Personal information
- Born: August 24, 1937 Monroe, Wisconsin, U.S.
- Died: December 31, 2024 (aged 87) Scottsdale, Arizona, U.S.
- Listed height: 6 ft 3 in (1.91 m)
- Listed weight: 200 lb (91 kg)

Career information
- High school: Monroe (Monroe, Wisconsin)
- College: Michigan State (1956–1959)
- NBA draft: 1959: 3rd round, 20th overall pick
- Drafted by: New York Knicks
- Playing career: 1959–1962
- Positions: Small forward, shooting guard
- Number: 18

Career history
- 1959–1960: New York Knicks
- 1961–1962: Hawaii Chiefs

Career highlights
- 2× Second-team All-Big Ten (1958, 1959)
- Stats at NBA.com
- Stats at Basketball Reference

Robert H. Anderegg (August 24, 1937 – December 31, 2024) was an American small forward and shooting guard in the National Basketball Association (NBA) and the American Basketball League (ABL). He played professionally for the New York Knicks and the Hawaii Chiefs.

== Life and career ==
Anderegg was born in Monroe, Wisconsin, and attended Monroe High School. He played college basketball for Michigan State University. The 6-foot-3-inch (1.91 m) 200 pounds (91 kg) guard-forward was selected by the New York Knicks in the 3rd round (22nd pick overall) of the 1959 NBA draft.

Anderegg played for the New York Knicks for thirty-three games in the 1959–60 NBA season. He played six games for the Hawaii Chiefs in the 1961–1962 ABL season before retiring in 1962.

Anderegg died on December 31, 2024, at the age of 87.

== Awards ==
In 2008 Anderegg was inducted into the Wisconsin Basketball Coaches Association (WBCA) Hall of Fame.

== Career statistics ==
Legend
GP	Games played	GS	Games started	MPG	Minutes per game
FG%	Field goal percentage	3P%	3-point field goal percentage	FT%	Free throw percentage
RPG	Rebounds per game	APG	Assists per game	SPG	Steals per game
BPG	Blocks per game	PPG	Points per game	**Bold**	Career high

=== NBA ===
==== Regular season ====
Year	Team	GP	MPG	FG%	FT%	RPG	APG	PPG
1959–60	New York	33	11.5	.385	.548	2.1	.9	4.0

==== College ====
*	Led Big Ten

Year	Team	GP	FG%	FT%	RPG	PPG
1956–57	Michigan State	**26***	.330	.575	5.0	8.6
1957–58	Michigan State	22	.405	**.619**	6.3	14.5
1958–59	Michigan State	23*	**.411**	.601	**8.2**	**19.6**
Career		71	.389	.598	6.4	14.0
