= University of Illinois slush fund scandal =

Scandal involving the University of Illinois athletic program

The University of Illinois slush fund scandal was an incident in which the athletic program at the University of Illinois at Urbana–Champaign was investigated and punished for paying players in violation of both NCAA and Big Ten Conference rules from 1962 until its exposure in December 1966. Although Illinois self-reported the violations, the Fighting Illini were forced to fire football coach Pete Elliott, basketball coach Harry Combes and assistant basketball coach Howie Braun under threat of expulsion from the Big Ten.

== Background ==
Starting in April 1962, three separate funds were set up to solicit donations from Illini supporters: a football fund (started April 1962), a basketball fund (started February 1964), and a Mills fund (started March 1966 and named for athletic director Doug Mills). The money in each fund was disbursed with approval from one of the football or basketball head coaches (Elliot and Combes) as well as the AD (Mills) and Assistant AD (Mel Brewer). Disbursements were made to student athletes supposedly for the purpose of assisting them in times of extreme financial need, such as Sam Price's wife developing blood clots during a pregnancy. However, student athletes were paid for travel and jobs during school breaks. In total, the slush funds allocated $21,642.95.

In November 1966, Mills resigned from his position as AD. Assistant AD Brewer wanted the job, however it appeared the job would soon be Elliot's. Brewer then turned over slush fund documents to then-UI president David Henry, who then notified the Big Ten office, leading to an investigation being opened. On December 12, both Brewer and Elliot withdrew from consideration for the AD job. Soon after, suspensions were doled out to players that had received payments from the fund making players ineligible to play the rest of the season.

The Big Ten would later announce the penalty on February 19, 1967- Head Football Coach Pete Elliott, Head Basketball Coach Harry Combes and Assistant Basketball Coach Howard Braun must be immediately fired and all players that received payments would be ineligible for Big Ten play for varying amounts of time (in total 14 players were implicated that were still enrolled in university athletics at the time). The coaches received support throughout the state, such as from the governor and the Illinois High School Coaches Association (IHSCA). The university appealed the decision to the faculty athletic representatives of the Big Ten but was rejected unanimously the following month. Thankfully, seven of the 14 athletes were cleared, while the remaining seven were deemed ineligible, and of those, five were suspended permanently.

The university then made its final appeal to the Big Ten university presidents. This was rejected on March 18 and the university was given three days to fire the involved coaches. Rather than wait to be fired, the three coaches resigned the following day.

== Coaches and players affected ==
=== Coaches ===
- Football HC Pete Elliott
- Basketball HC Harry Combes
- Assistant basketball coach Howie Braun

=== Affected players ===
- Oscar Polite (Dropped out)
- Steve Spanich (Transferred and dropped out)
- Bob Stephens (Transferred and dropped out)
- Darek Faison (Transferred)
- Rich Jones (Transferred and dropped out)
- Steve Kuberski (Transferred)
- Ron Dunlap (Went pro)
- Cyril Pinder (Went pro)
- Randy Crews (Stayed with Illini)
- Six unnamed athletes (Five on probation and one dropped out)
