= Craig Dill =

American basketball player

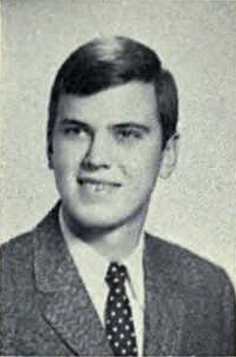
- Dill from 1967 Michiganensian

Personal information
- Born: December 17, 1944 (age 81)
- Listed height: 6 ft 11 in (2.11 m)
- Listed weight: 215 lb (98 kg)

Career information
- High school: Arthur Hill (Saginaw, Michigan)
- College: Michigan (1964–1967)
- NBA draft: 1967: 4th round, 42nd overall pick
- Drafted by: San Diego Rockets
- Position: Center
- Number: 13

Career history
- 1967–1968: Pittsburgh Pipers

Career highlights
- ABA champion (1968)
- Stats at Basketball Reference

Craig H. Dill (born December 17, 1944) is a former American basketball player.

Dill played college basketball at the University of Michigan. He was a 6'11" center.

Dill was drafted in the fourth round (11th pick, 42nd overall) of the 1967 NBA draft by the San Diego Rockets but opted instead to play for the Pittsburgh Pipers of the American Basketball Association.

Dill was a member of the 1967–68 Pittsburgh Pipers team that won the 1968 ABA Championship. During that season Dill averaged 6.8 points and 5.8 rebounds per game.
