= Harry Combes =

American basketball coach (1915–1977)

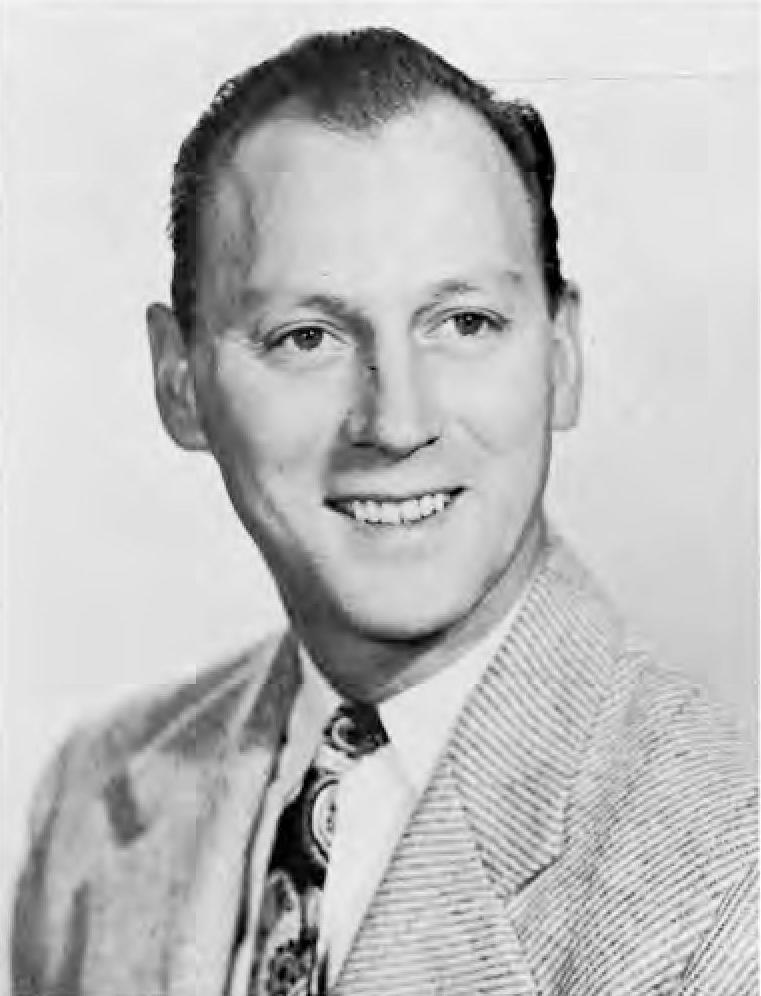
- Combes in 1963

Biographical details
- Born: March 3, 1915; Monticello, Illinois, U.S.
- Died: November 13, 1977 (aged 62); Champaign, Illinois, U.S.
- Education: Monticello H.S. (1933)

Playing career
- 1935–1937: Illinois

Coaching career (HC unless noted)
- 1938–1947: Champaign HS
- 1947–1967: Illinois

Head coaching record
- Overall: 316–150 (college)

Accomplishments and honors

Championships
- 3 NCAA Regional—Final Four (1949, 1951, 1952); 4 Big Ten regular season (1949, 1951, 1952, 1963); Illinois High School (1946)

Awards
- 100 Legends of the IHSA Boys Basketball Tournament (2007)

Harry Combes (March 3, 1915 – November 13, 1977), a native of Monticello, Illinois, served as head men's basketball coach at University of Illinois between 1947 and 1967.

== Biography ==
Combes played high school basketball for Monticello High School, where he led his teams to an overall combined record of 72–9 when he graduated in 1933.

A three-year letterwinner, Combes was also a star player for the Illini from 1935 to 1937 and helped lead Illinois to both its Big Ten titles in the 1930s.

Combes began coaching basketball at Champaign High School, where he posted an astounding 254–46 record, including winning the state title in 1946. Beyond the single championship, Combes led Champaign Central to seven state tournament appearances in nine years from 1939 to 1947. During that time the Maroons captured fourth place in 1940 and 1944 before starting three years of amazing runs to the championship game where they finished second in 1945, first in 1946, and second in 1947. In 2007, the Illinois High School Association named Combes one of the 100 Legends of the IHSA Boys Basketball Tournament.

Combes also served as boys baseball coach at Champaign High School, where he compiled an impressive 70–26–2 (.724) record over a five-year period (1937–1942).

Once at Illinois he won three Big Ten titles in his first five seasons (1949, 1951, and 1952). Combes led Illinois to three third-place finishes in the NCAA tournament in the four-year period from 1949 to 1952. The squad won 79 of the 100 games during those four years. Illinois' 1952 Final Four appearance was the first officially recognized Final Four, and the three third-place finishes would be the Illini's deepest runs in the tournament until the 1989 team made the Final Four. Until Lou Henson broke the record in 1990, Combes' 316 wins were the most wins ever by an Illinois head basketball coach.

Combes, along with his assistant coach Howie Braun and head football coach Pete Elliott, were pressured into resigning on March 19, 1967 by the university which was threatened with expulsion by the Big Ten Conference over a slush fund scandal. He was succeeded by Harv Schmidt ten days later on March 29.

He died in Champaign on November 13, 1977.

== Head coaching record ==
=== High school ===
School	Season	Record	Postseason
Champaign HS	1938–39	18–9	State Quarterfinals
Champaign HS	1939–40	26–8	State Semifinals
Champaign HS	1940–41	26–3	
Champaign HS	1941–42	22–7	
Champaign HS	1942–43	25–6	State Quarterfinals
Champaign HS	1943–44	31–6	State Semifinals
Champaign HS	1944–45	34–2	State Championship (Runner-up)
Champaign HS	1945–46	38–1	State Championship
Champaign HS	1946–47	34–4	State Championship (Runner-up)
Total	Champaign HS	254–46	88–47

=== College ===
Record table
Season	Team	Overall	Conference	Standing	Postseason
Illinois Fighting Illini (Big Ten Conference) (1937–1948)
1947–48	Illinois	15–5	7–5	T–3rd	
1948–49	Illinois	21–4	10–2	1st	NCAA Third Place
1949–50	Illinois	14–8	7–5	T–3rd	
1950–51	Illinois	22–5	13–1	1st	NCAA Third Place
1951–52	Illinois	22–4	12–2	1st	NCAA Third Place
1952–53	Illinois	18–4	14–4	2nd	
1953–54	Illinois	17–5	10–4	T–3rd	
1954–55	Illinois	17–5	10–4	T–2nd	
1955–56	Illinois	18–4	11–3	2nd	
1956–57	Illinois	14–8	7–7	7th	
1957–58	Illinois	11–11	5–9	T–8th	
1958–59	Illinois	12–10	7–7	T–5th	
1959–60	Illinois	16–7	8–6	T–3rd	
1960–61	Illinois	9–15	5–9	7th	
1961–62	Illinois	15–8	7–7	T–4th	
1962–63	Illinois	20–6	11–3	1st	NCAA University Division Elite Eight
1963–64	Illinois	13–11	6–8	T–6th	
1964–65	Illinois	18–6	10–4	3rd	
1965–66	Illinois	12–12	8–6	T–3rd	
1966–67	Illinois	12–12	6–8	T–7th	
Illinois:		316–150	174–104		
Total:		316–150			
National champion Postseason invitational champion Conference regular season champion Conference regular season and conference tournament champion Division regular season champion Division regular season and conference tournament champion Conference tournament champion

== See also ==
- List of NCAA Division I Men's Final Four appearances by coach
