= Ron Dunlap (basketball) =

American basketball player (1946–2019)

Personal information
- Born: December 2, 1946 Chicago, Illinois, U.S.
- Died: October 28, 2019 (aged 72) Appleton, Wisconsin, U.S.
- Listed height: 6 ft 8 in (2.03 m)
- Listed weight: 220 lb (100 kg)

Career information
- High school: Farragut Academy (Chicago, Illinois)
- College: Illinois (1965–1966)
- NBA draft: 1968: 2nd round, 19th overall pick
- Drafted by: Chicago Bulls
- Playing career: 1969–1973
- Position: Center
- Number: 35, 7

Career history
- 1967–1968: Chicago Bombers
- 1969–1974: Rockford Royals
- 1971–1973: Maccabi Tel Aviv B.C.
- Stats at Basketball Reference

Ron Dunlap (December 2, 1946 – October 28, 2019) was an American professional basketball player from Illinois. Dunlap, a high school center from Farragut Academy, went on to play for the Illinois Fighting Illini for one year (1965–66). He was a member of the freshman squad during the 1964–65 season and played a key role on the 1965–66 varsity squad, additionally, he started the 1966–67 season with the team and was subsequently dismissed as part of the "slush fund" investigation. Dunlap scored 161 career points with 169 rebounds while only playing 28 games for the Fighting Illini.

== Career ==
Dunlap attended the University of Illinois at Urbana-Champaign, playing two seasons for the Fighting Illini. He was forced to skip his last two seasons of basketball (1967–1968) due to a scandal involving illicit "slush funds" and funding paid to University of Illinois players on its basketball and football teams. During this era, the NCAA allowed $15 a month in stipends; however, the Big Ten Conference did not. Dunlap, married and the father of a daughter at the time, had received a total of $410 in monthly increments. Three Illini coaches resigned under pressure, and the athletes receiving the payments lost their remaining eligibility to play in the Big Ten. Based on the incident, the NCAA suspended the Fighting Illini for two seasons.

Dunlap played with the Chicago Bombers of the North American Basketball League in 1967–1968.

Despite the enforced break from the game, Dunlap was selected in the second round of 1968 NBA draft by Chicago Bulls. He continued his career in the Continental Basketball Association with the Rockford Royals, and later in Israel with Maccabi Tel Aviv.

== Later life ==
After his basketball career ended, Dunlap earned a master's degree from Roosevelt University in 1978. He spent the next thirty six years as an educator. He was a principal for twenty three years, with sixteen of those with the Appleton Area School District, in Appleton, Wisconsin. During those years he also served as adjunct professor at Triton Community College in River Grove, Illinois and Viterbo University in La Crosse. When Dunlap became principal of Lincoln Elementary School, he was among only a few black school administrators in northeastern Wisconsin. Following his time as principal at Lincoln, Dunlap served as the District's first Coordinator of Minority Services.

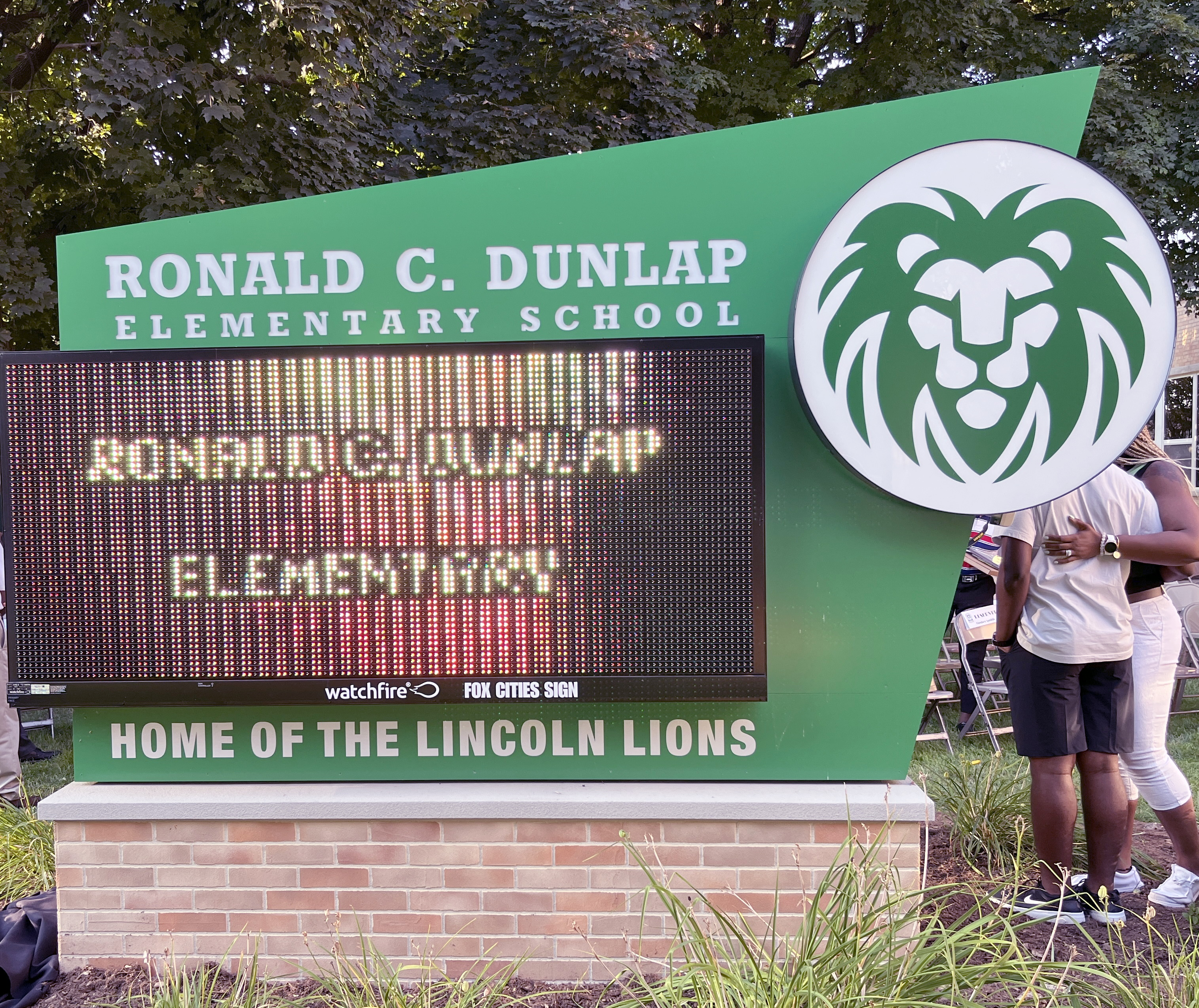
Lincoln Elementary School was renamed for Ronald Dunlap on August 22, 2022.

The Wisconsin PTA sponsors the Ron Dunlap Administrator of the Year Award in recognition of his service to the organization. In 2022, the Appleton Area Public Schools renamed the school where he served as principal after him in recognition of his many contributions to the community.
