= Howie Braun =

American basketball player and coach

- Howie Braun

Biographical details
- Born: November 13, 1912; Champaign, Illinois, U.S.
- Died: January 9, 1996 (aged 83); Urbana, Illinois, U.S.

Playing career
- 1933–1936: Illinois

Coaching career (HC unless noted)
- 1937–1967: Illinois (assistant)

Howard J. Braun (November 13, 1912 – January 9, 1996) was an American college basketball assistant coach for the University of Illinois from 1937 to 1967. Braun graduated from the University of Illinois in 1936. He won six varsity letters in tennis and basketball and was a member of the "I" Men's Club.

For three decades Howie Braun was responsible for all recruiting of high school basketball player for the University of Illinois. Braun worked and played for three legendary Fighting Illini head coaches. From 1933–1936, Braun played for Craig Ruby, winning a Big Ten Conference championship in 1935. He coached with Doug Mills from 1937 to 1947, winning conference championships in 1937, 1942 and 1943, and Harry Combes from 1948–1967, winning conference championships in 1949, 1951, 1952 and 1963.

While recruiting, head coaches generally didn't become involved until an athlete made it to campus for an official visit. Since there was no AAU summer basketball as exists today, most major college coaches had the summers to themselves. While on the recruiting circuit, Braun was known for operating alone. He was known for being an intense, strong-willed man with a good heart who many former athletes respected.

After a notorious slush fund scandal in 1967, Braun was banned from coaching in the Big Ten and began working in public relations at the Commercial Bank of Champaign. He also was president of Worden-Martin Leasing from 1967 to 1977. Additionally, he was the pro golf manager at Lincolnshire Fields golf course in Champaign.
