= Langston High School =

Langston High School may refer to:

- Langston High School (Tennessee) in Johnson City, Tennessee established in 1893 and named for John Mercer Langston
- Langston High School (Arkansas) in Hot Springs, Arkansas where Ike Thomas, Mamie Phipps Clark and Edith Mae Irby Jones went
- John M. Langston High School in Danville, Virginia named for John Mercer Langston and where C. B. Claiborne went

== Langston Hughes High School ==
- Langston Hughes High School in Fairburn, Georgia
