= Duke basketball =

Duke basketball can refer to:

- Duke Blue Devils men's basketball
- Duke Blue Devils women's basketball
