= Debbie Leonard =

American basketball player and coach (born 1951)

Debbie Leonard (born November 22, 1951) is a former college women's basketball coach of Duke Blue Devils women's basketball and is currently a television commentator and State Farm agent.

Leonard was head coach at Duke from 1977–92 and led the team to a 212–190 overall record. She was ACC and District 3 Coach of the Year in 1984–85, when the team went 19–8. Her best win total came the next year when the team went 21–9 overall and 9–5 in the ACC, finishing third. She led the team to its first NCAA Tournament appearance in 1987.

She was an assistant coach on the 1987 Junior National Team for the Jones Cup in Taipei. She was also an assistant coach at the 1987 U.S. Olympic Festival.

Leonard was named an ACC Legend in 2010. She is a 1970 graduate of North Davidson High School and 1974 graduate of High Point University, where she was a member of the women's basketball team.

== Year by year ==
Season	Team	Overall	Conference	Standing	Postseason	Coaches' poll	AP poll
Debbie Leonard (ACC) (1977–1992)
1977–78	Duke	1–19	0–8	7th	NCAIAW Tournament		
1978–79	Duke	11–11	3–6	5th	NCAIAW Tournament		
1979–80	Duke	14–13	5–5	T-4th	NCAIAW Tournament		
1980–81	Duke	11–14	3–6	6th	NCAIAW Tournament		
1981–82	Duke	14–15	3–8	6th	AIAW Region II Tournament		
1982–83	Duke	15–10	6–7	4th			
1983–84	Duke	13–14	5–9	6th			
1984–85	Duke	19–8	7–7	5th			
1985–86	Duke	21–9	9–5	3rd	NWIT Fourth Place		
1986–87	Duke	19–10	7–7	4th	NCAA Second Round (Play-In)		
1987–88	Duke	17–11	5–9	5th			
1988–89	Duke	12–16	2–12	7th			
1989–90	Duke	15–13	4–10	T-6th			
1990–91	Duke	16–12	6–8	5th			
1991–92	Duke	14–15	4–12	8th			
Debbie Leonard:		212–190	69–119				
Total:		212–190					
National champion Postseason invitational champion Conference regular season champion Conference regular season and conference tournament champion Division regular season champion Division regular season and conference tournament champion Conference tournament champion
