= 1966–67 North Carolina Tar Heels men's basketball team =

American college basketball season

1966–67 North Carolina Tar Heels men's basketball

ACC tournament champions ACC regular season champions

NCAA tournament, Final Four
- Conference: Atlantic Coast Conference

Ranking
- Coaches: No. 3
- AP: No. 4
- Record: 26–6 (12–2 ACC)
- Head coach: Dean Smith (6th season)
- Home arena: Carmichael Arena

1966–67 ACC men's basketball standings
| | Conf. | | | | Overall |
| Team | W | | L | PCT | W | | L | PCT |
|---|---|---|---|---|---|---|---|---|
| No. 4 North Carolina † | 12 | – | 2 | .857 | 26 | – | 6 | .813 |
| Duke | 9 | – | 3 | .750 | 18 | – | 9 | .667 |
| South Carolina | 8 | – | 4 | .667 | 16 | – | 7 | .696 |
| Clemson | 9 | – | 5 | .643 | 17 | – | 8 | .680 |
| Wake Forest | 5 | – | 9 | .357 | 9 | – | 18 | .333 |
| Maryland | 5 | – | 9 | .357 | 11 | – | 14 | .440 |
| Virginia | 4 | – | 10 | .286 | 9 | – | 17 | .346 |
| NC State | 2 | – | 12 | .143 | 7 | – | 19 | .269 |
† 1967 ACC tournament winner Rankings from AP Poll

The 1966–67 North Carolina Tar Heels men's basketball team represented the University of North Carolina at Chapel Hill during the 1966–67 men's college basketball season.

== Schedule ==
| Date time, TV | Rank^{#} | Opponent^{#} | Result | Record | Site city, state |
|---|---|---|---|---|---|
| December 1 | No. 9 | Clemson | W 76–65 | | Carmichael Arena; Chapel Hill, NC |
| December 3* | No. 9 | vs. Penn State | W 93–63 | | Greensboro, NC |
| December 9* | No. 8 | Tulane | W 92–69 | | Carmichael Arena; Chapel Hill, NC |
| December 13* | No. 8 | at No. 4 Kentucky; Rivalry | W 64–55 | | Lexington, KY |
| December 17* | No. 6 | vs. NYU | W 95–58 | | Greensboro, NC |
| December 19* | No. 6 | vs. Columbia; Tampa Invitational Tournament | W 98–66 | | Tampa, FL |
| December 20* | No. 6 | vs. Florida State; Tampa Invitational Tournament | W 81–54 | | Tampa, FL |
| December 27* | No. 3 | vs. Furman | W 101–56 | | Greensboro, NC |
| December 30* | No. 3 | vs. Ohio State | W 105–82 | | Charlotte, NC |
| January 2* | No. 3 | Princeton | L 81–91 | | Carmichael Arena; Chapel Hill, NC |
| January 4 | No. 3 | at Wake Forest | W 76–74 | | Winston–Salem Memorial Coliseum; Winston-Salem, NC |
| January 7 | No. 3 | at Duke; Rivalry | W 59–56 | | Cameron Indoor Stadium; Durham, NC |
| January 11 | No. 5 | NC State; Rivalry | W 79–78 | | Carmichael Arena; Chapel Hill, NC |
| January 28 | No. 2 | Virginia | W 103–76 | | Carmichael Arena; Chapel Hill, NC |
| February 4 | No. 2 | Maryland | W 85–77 | | Carmichael Arena; Chapel Hill, NC |
| February 7 | No. 2 | at Virginia | W 79–75 | | University Hall; Charlottesville, VA |
| February 9 | No. 2 | Wake Forest | W 75–73 | | Carmichael Auditorium; Chapel Hill, NC |
| February 11* | No. 2 | at Georgia Tech | L 80–82 | | Alexander Memorial Coliseum; Atlanta, GA |
| February 14 | No. 2 | at NC State | W 77–60 | | Raleigh, NC |
| February 17 | No. 4 | vs. South Carolina; North-South Doubleheader | W 80–55 | | Charlotte Coliseum; Charlotte, NC |
| February 18 | No. 4 | vs. Clemson; North-South Doubleheader | L 88–92 | | Charlotte Coliseum; Charlotte, NC |
| February 22 | No. 5 | at Maryland | W 79–78 | | Cole Field House; College Park, MD |
| February 25* | No. 5 | Virginia Tech | W 110–78 | | Carmichael Auditorium; Chapel Hill, NC |
| March 1 | No. 3 | at South Carolina | L 57–70 | | Carolina Field House; Columbia, SC |
| March 4 | No. 3 | Duke | W 92–79 | | Carmichael Auditorium; Chapel Hill, NC |
| March 9* | No. 4 | vs. NC State; ACC tournament | W 56–53 | | Greensboro Coliseum; Greensboro, NC |
| March 10* | No. 4 | vs. Wake Forest; ACC tournament | W 89–79 | | Greensboro Coliseum; Greensboro, NC |
| March 11* | No. 4 | vs. Duke; ACC Tournament | W 82–73 | | Greensboro Coliseum; Greensboro, NC |
| March 17* | No. 4 | vs. No. 5 Princeton; NCAA tournament | W 78–70 ^{OT} | | College Park, MD |
| March 18* | No. 4 | vs. No. 9 Boston College; NCAA Tournament | W 96–80 | | College Park, MD |
| March 24* | No. 4 | vs. Dayton; NCAA tournament – Final Four | L 62–76 | 26–5 | Freedom Hall (18,889); Louisville, KY |
| March 25* | No. 4 | No. 7 Houston; NCAA tournament – third-place game | L 62–84 | 26–6 | Freedom Hall; Louisville, KY |
*Non-conference game. ^{#}Rankings from AP Poll. (#) Tournament seedings in parentheses. E=East.
