= Hot Springs High School (Arkansas) =

Hot Springs World Class High School
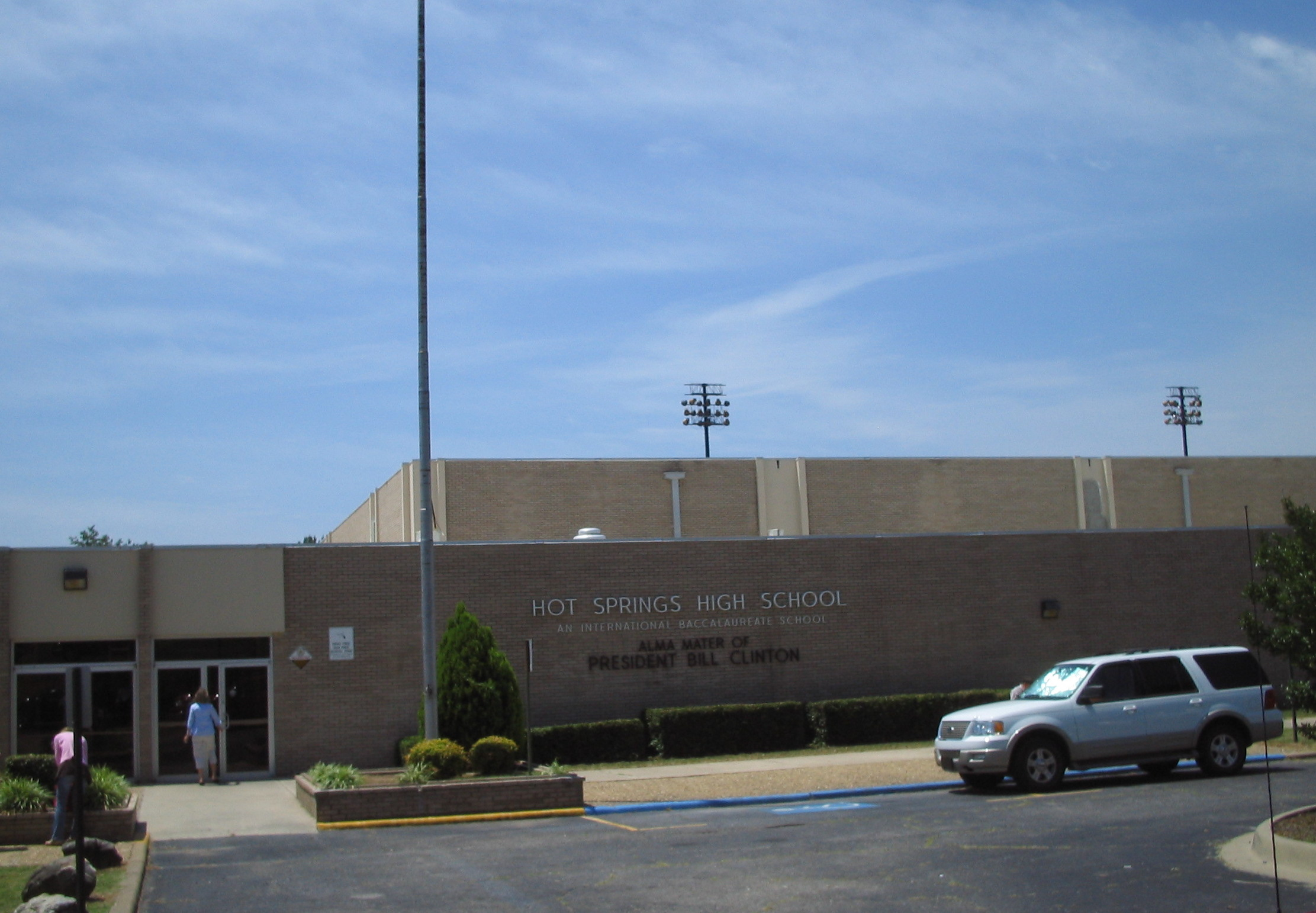
- Entrance of Hot Springs High School

Location
- 701 Emory Street; Hot Springs, Arkansas 71913; United States; 34°28′33″N 93°4′12″W

Information
- Type: Public magnet high school
- Established: 1887 (139 years ago)
- School district: Hot Springs School District
- NCES District ID: 0507890
- CEEB code: 041145
- NCES School ID: 050789000509
- Principal: Kiley Simms
- Grades: 9−12
- Enrollment: 767 (2023-2024)
- Student to teacher ratio: 12.16
- Campus type: Urban
- Colors: Black and gold
- Athletics conference: 5A South (2012−14)
- Mascot: Trojan
- Team name: Hot Springs Trojans
- Accreditation: ADE; AdvancED (1924–)
- USNWR ranking: No. 9 (AR); No. 1,385 (USA); No. 102 (Magnet)
- National ranking: No. 1,708 (Challenge Index)
- Yearbook: The Old Gold Book
- Affiliation: Arkansas Activities Association
- Website: www.hssd.net/67042_3

Hot Springs World Class High School (HSWCHS) is a public magnet secondary school located in Hot Springs, Arkansas, United States. HSWCHS is one of seven public high schools in Garland County and the sole high school of the Hot Springs School District. The school's 1914 facility is listed on the National Register of Historic Places and its academic programs include Advanced Placement (AP) coursework and International Baccalaureate (IB) Diploma Programme. It was a segregated school and Hot Springs refused to integrate for more than a decade after Brown v. Board of Education and when it finally did it made Langston High School refuse to provide busing to Hot Springs High School from African American neighborhoods, and largely excluded African American faculty from Langston and limited the activities of African American students.

== Academics ==
The high school offers Advanced Placement (AP) courses in English Language and Composition, Statistics, Physics and Psychology. Students are also able to earn concurrent college credit through National Park Community College, a local community college. Hot Springs High School has been an authorized International Baccalaureate (IB) School since 2004; its students can participate in the IB Middle Years Programme and the IB Diploma Programme. Special courses offered include Spanish, French, Chinese, digital imagery, computer graphic design, fine arts, guitar, business, Theory of Knowledge for IB students, ROTC, and family and consumer sciences.

The Best High Schools 2012 report by U.S. News & World Report ranked Hot Springs as the No. 9 high school in the state, the nation's No. 102 magnet school, and No. 1,385 nationally.

Hot Springs High School is accredited by the Arkansas Department of Education (ADE) and is an accredited charter member of AdvancED since 1924.

The Hot Springs High School yearbook, The Old Gold Book, has been published, with a few exceptions, since 1914.

== Athletics ==
The Hot Springs High School mascot and athletic emblem is the Trojan with black and gold serving as the school colors.

The Hot Springs Trojans have won a total of 24 Arkansas state championships. The Trojans compete within the 5A Classification as administered by the Arkansas Activities Association. For 2017–18, the Trojans compete from the 5A South Conference in sports including football, basketball, soccer, baseball, golf, band, volleyball, bowling, track, softball, dance, cheerleading, wrestling, swimming, and tennis.

- Football: The Trojans have won four Arkansas state high school football championships in 1934, 1942, 1970, and 1972. Pro Football Hall of Fame players Bobby Mitchell and Cliff Harris both played for the Trojans.
- Boys Basketball: The Trojans boys basketball teams have won three state basketball championships in (1932, 1996, 1998).
- Boys Track and field: The Trojans boys track teams have won four Arkansas state track and field championships in 1972, 1999, 2000 and 2001. Former Junior World Champion and 2016 Olympian Antwon Hicks led the Trojans to state championships in 1999, 2000, and 2001.
- Boys Soccer: The Trojans boys soccer teams have won two state championships in 2016 and 2017. The Trojans defeated Valley View 4–2 to win the 2016 Class 5A Boys Soccer State Championship, and defeated conference rival DeQueen to win the 2017 Class 5A Boys Soccer State Championship with a 3–1 victory. The Trojans also repeated as back to back 5A South Conference Champions in 2017 and 2018. The Trojans were state semifinalists in 2014 and 2015. Notable soccer player Erick Guadron (2014-2017) set the state scoring record of 187 total career goals during his four-year career with the Trojans.
- Boys Golf: The Trojans boys golf teams have won four Arkansas state golf championships in 1961, 1962, 1971, and 1972.
- Girls Basketball: The Lady Trojans have won five Arkansas state high school basketball championships in 1990, 1997, 1998, 2015, and 2018. The Lady Trojans defeated Pulaski Academy 62–61 in overtime to clinch the 2015 Class 5A Girls Basketball State Championship. Former SEC player of the year, 1st team collegiate All American, and WNBA All Star Shameka Christon is a Hot Springs alumnus. Christon led the Lady Trojans to state championships in 1997 and 1998.
- Girls Tennis: The Trojans girls tennis teams have won four Arkansas state championships. 2 in 1979 when Laura Gaye and Vicki Carter won the doubles championship at Burns Park and Vicki Carter won singles. The other two championships were in 1993

== History ==
- Hot Springs High School
- U.S. National Register of Historic Places
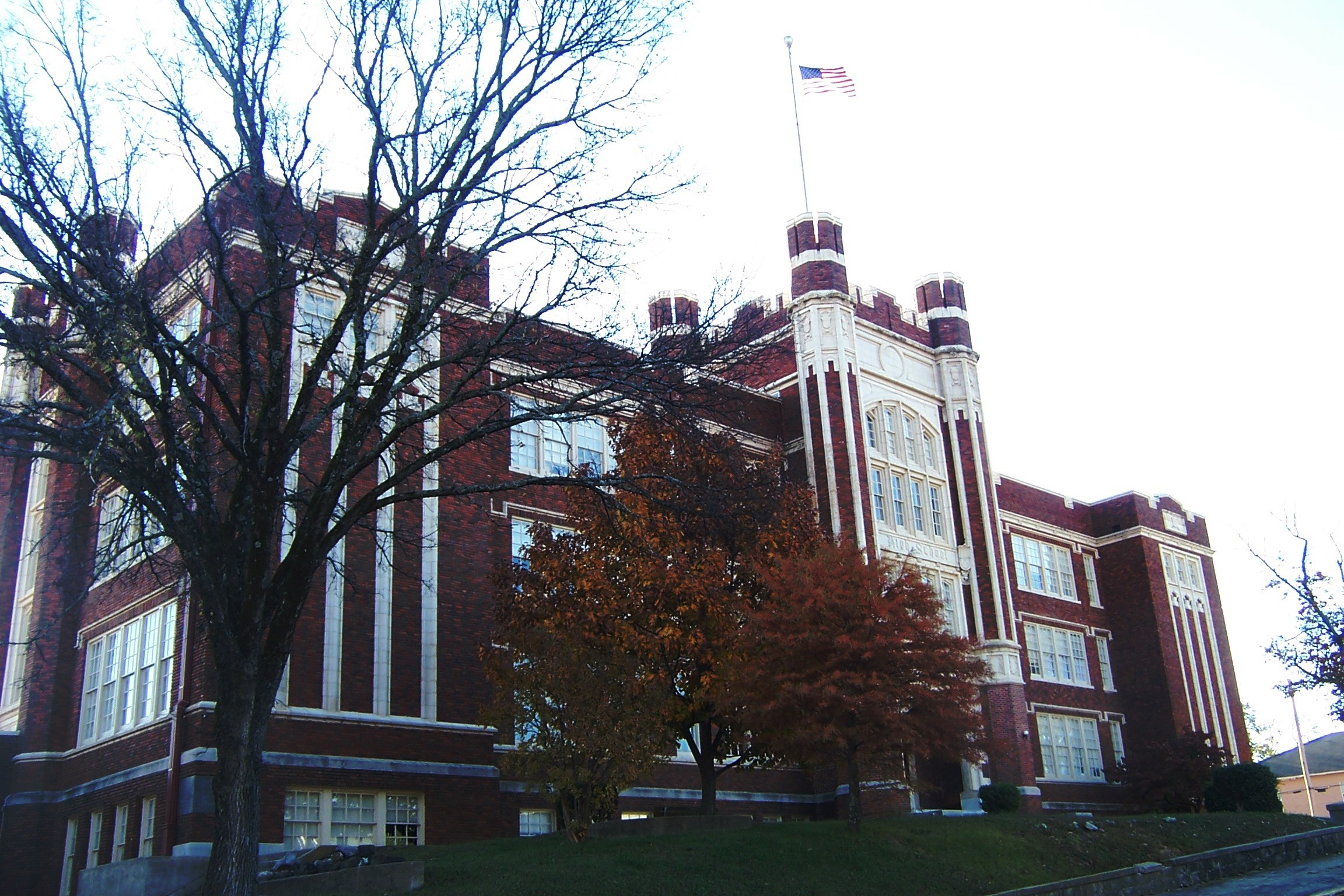
- Historic Hot Springs High School

- Location within Arkansas Location within the United States
- Location: Oak St. between Orange and Olive Sts., Hot Springs, Arkansas
- Coordinates: 34°30′19″N 93°3′12″W
- Area: 1.5 acres (0.61 ha)
- Built: 1914
- Architect: Sanguinet & Staats
- Architectural style: Late Gothic Revival
- NRHP reference No.: 87002495
- Added to NRHP: January 28, 1988

=== Historic facility ===
Hot Springs High School was built in 1914 by the now famed Sanguinet & Staats architectural firm as a large, Late Gothic Revival structure located near the center of Hot Springs. It was segregated in the school's early history, with African American students able to attend Langston High School starting in 1913.

Bill Clinton graduated in 1964. In 1988, this school building was listed on the National Register of Historic Places.

After Hot Springs High School moved to its current location on Emory Street in 1968, the old building was used as the Central Junior High until 1992. An earlier Hot Springs High School building was located at the same site on Oak Street. This structure burned in the fire of September 1913 that destroyed a large part of Hot Springs. In 2006, the historic facility was repurposed as 32 housing units for persons with disabilities, as the Hot Springs High School Lofts.

== Notable alumni ==
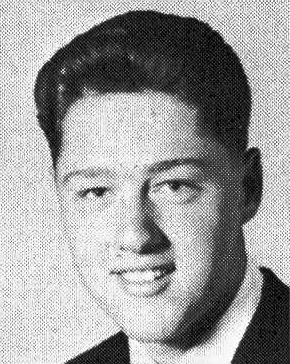
Bill Clinton as a junior in 1963.

- Bill Clinton (1964) — 42nd president of the United States (1993–2001)
- Antwon Hicks (2000) - 2016 Olympian, 2002 Gold Medalist 2002 World Junior Championships in Athletics, and twice NCAA indoor champion in the 60-meter hurdles. He was also a 15-time state high school champion
- Shameka Christon (2000)—Professional basketball player for the WNBA's Chicago Sky
- Cliff Harris—Professional football player for the Dallas Cowboys; National Football League 1970s All-Decade Team
- Jack McMahan - Former MLB pitcher (Pittsburgh Pirates, Kansas City Athletics)
- Alford L. McMichael (1970)—Sergeant Major of the Marine Corps (1999–2003)
- LTC Hugh L. Mills Jr. (1966) - Highly decorated US Army helicopter pilot and author of Low Level Hell: A Scout Pilot in the Big Red One. Inductee in the US Army Aviation Hall of Fame, US Army OCS Hall of Fame, Arkansas Combat Veterans Hall of Fame, and Arkansas Aviation Hall of Fame. President of the class of 1966. His father Dr. Hugh L. Mills Sr. was superintendent of the Hot Springs schools
- Bobby Mitchell (1953)—Professional football player for the Cleveland Browns and Washington Redskins, and coach for the latter. Pro Football Hall of Famer
- James White—former NFL defensive tackle
