= List of Duke Blue Devils men's basketball seasons =

This is a list of the seasons completed by the Duke Blue Devils men's basketball.

== Season-by-season results ==
Statistics overview
Season	Coach	Overall	Conference	Standing	Postseason
Wilbur Wade Card (1905–1912)
1905–06	W.W. Card	2–3	—	—	—
1906–07	W.W. Card	4–2	—	—	—
1907–08	W.W. Card	2–3	—	—	—
1908–09	W.W. Card	8–1	—	—	—
1909–10	W.W. Card	4–4	—	—	—
1910–11	W.W. Card	4–3	—	—	—
1911–12	W.W. Card	6–1	—	—	—
W.W. Cap Card:		30–17	–		
Joseph E. Brinn (1912–1913)
1912–13	Joseph E. Brinn	11–8	—	—	—
Joseph E. Brinn:		11–8	–		
Noble L. Clay (1913–1915)
1913–14	Noble L. Clay	12–9	—	—	—
1914–15	Noble L. Clay	10–10	—	—	—
Noble L. Clay:		22–19	–		
Bob Doak (1915–1916)
1915–16	Bob Doak	9–11	—	—	—
Bob Doak:		9–11	–		
Charles Doak (1916–1918)
1916–17	Chick Doak	20–4	—	—	—
1917–18	Chick Doak	10–5	—	—	—
Chick Doak:		30–9	–		
Henry P. Cole (1918–1919)
1918–19	Henry P. Cole	6–5	—	—	—
Henry P. Cole:		6–5	–		
Walter J. Rothensies (1919–1920)
1919–20	Walter J. Rothensies	10–4	—	—	—
Walter J. Rothensies:		10–4	–		
Floyd Egan (1920–1921)
1920–21	Floyd Egan	9–6	—	—	—
Floyd Egan:		9–6	–		
James Baldwin (1921–1922)
1921–22	James Baldwin	6–12	—	—	—
James Baldwin:		6–12	–		
Jesse S. Burbage (1922–1924)
1922–23	Jesse S. Burbage	15–7	—	—	—
1923–24	Jesse S. Burbage	19–6	—	—	—
Jesse S. Burbage:		34–13	–		
George Buchheit (1924–1928)
1924–25	George Buchheit	4–9	—	—	—
1925–26	George Buchheit	8–12	—	—	—
1926–27	George Buchheit	4–10	—	—	—
1927–28	George Buchheit	9–5	—	—	—
George Buchheit:		25–36	–		
Eddie Cameron (Southern Conference) (1928–1942)
1928–29	Eddie Cameron	12–8	5–4	10th	—
1929–30	Eddie Cameron	18–2	9–1	T–2nd	—
1930–31	Eddie Cameron	14–7	5–4	7th	—
1931–32	Eddie Cameron	14–11	6–5	11th	—
1932–33	Eddie Cameron	17–5	7–3	T–2nd	—
1933–34	Eddie Cameron	18–6	9–4	4th	—
1934–35	Eddie Cameron	18–8	10–4	3rd	—
1935–36	Eddie Cameron	20–6	4–5	6th	—
1936–37	Eddie Cameron	15–8	11–6	5th	—
1937–38	Eddie Cameron	15–9	9–5	5th	—
1938–39	Eddie Cameron	10–12	8–8	T–8th	—
1939–40	Eddie Cameron	19–7	13–2	1st	—
1940–41	Eddie Cameron	14–8	8–4	T–5th	—
1941–42	Eddie Cameron	22–2	15–1	1st	—
Eddie Cameron:		226–99	119–56		
Gerry Gerard (Southern Conference) (1942–1950)
1942–43	Gerry Gerard	20–6	12–1	1st	—
1943–44	Gerry Gerard	13–13	4–2	3rd	—
1944–45	Gerry Gerard	13–9	6–1	3rd	—
1945–46	Gerry Gerard	21–6	12–2	2nd	—
1946–47	Gerry Gerard	19–8	10–4	3rd	—
1947–48	Gerry Gerard	17–12	8–6	7th	—
1948–49	Gerry Gerard	13–9	5–7	10th	—
1949–50	Gerry Gerard	15–15	9–7	8th	—
Gerry Gerard:		131–78	66–30		
Harold Bradley (Southern Conference) (1950–1953)
1950–51	Harold Bradley	20–13	13–6	T–4th	—
1951–52	Harold Bradley	24–6	13–3	3rd	—
1952–53	Harold Bradley	17–8	12–4	6th	—
Harold Bradley (Atlantic Coast Conference) (1953–1959)
1953–54	Harold Bradley	21–6	9–1	1st	—
1954–55	Harold Bradley	20–8	11–3	2nd	NCAA first round
1955–56	Harold Bradley	19–7	10–4	T–3rd	—
1956–57	Harold Bradley	13–11	8–6	3rd	—
1957–58	Harold Bradley	18–7	11–3	1st	—
1958–59	Harold Bradley	13–12	7–7	T–3rd	—
Harold Bradley:		165–78	94–37		
Vic Bubas (Atlantic Coast Conference) (1959–1969)
1959–60	Vic Bubas	17–11	7–7	4th	NCAA University Division Elite Eight
1960–61	Vic Bubas	22–6	10–4	3rd	—
1961–62	Vic Bubas	20–5	11–3	2nd	—
1962–63	Vic Bubas	27–3	14–0	1st	NCAA University Division Third Place
1963–64	Vic Bubas	26–5	13–1	1st	NCAA University Division Runner-up
1964–65	Vic Bubas	20–5	11–3	1st	—
1965–66	Vic Bubas	26–4	12–2	1st	NCAA University Division Third Place
1966–67	Vic Bubas	18–9	9–3	2nd	NIT Quarterfinal
1967–68	Vic Bubas	22–6	11–3	2nd	NIT Quarterfinal
1968–69	Vic Bubas	15–13	8–6	T–3rd	—
Vic Bubas:		213–67	106–32		
Bucky Waters (Atlantic Coast Conference) (1969–1973)
1969–70	Bucky Waters	17–9	8–6	4th	NIT first round
1970–71	Bucky Waters	20–10	9–5	3rd	NIT Fourth Place
1971–72	Bucky Waters	14–12	6–6	T–4th	—
1972–73	Bucky Waters	12–14	4–8	T–4th	—
Bucky Waters:		63–45	27–25		
Neill McGeachy (Atlantic Coast Conference) (1973–1974)
1973–74	Neill McGeachy	10–16	2–10	7th	—
Neill McGeachy:		10–16	2–10		
Bill Foster (Atlantic Coast Conference) (1974–1980)
1974–75	Bill Foster	13–13	2–10	T–6th	—
1975–76	Bill Foster	13–14	3–9	7th	—
1976–77	Bill Foster	14–13	2–10	T–6th	—
1977–78	Bill Foster	27–7	8–4	2nd	NCAA Division I Runner-up
1978–79	Bill Foster	22–8	9–3	T–1st	NCAA Division I second round
1979–80	Bill Foster	24–9	7–7	T–5th	NCAA Division I Elite Eight
Bill Foster:		113–64	31–43		
Mike Krzyzewski (Atlantic Coast Conference) (1980–2022)
1980–81	Mike Krzyzewski	17–13	6–8	T–5th	NIT Quarterfinal
1981–82	Mike Krzyzewski	10–17	4–10	T–6th	—
1982–83	Mike Krzyzewski	11–17	3–11	7th	—
1983–84	Mike Krzyzewski	24–10	7–7	T–3rd	NCAA Division I second round
1984–85	Mike Krzyzewski	23–8	8–6	T–4th	NCAA Division I second round
1985–86	Mike Krzyzewski	37–3	12–2	1st	NCAA Division I Runner-up
1986–87	Mike Krzyzewski	24–9	9–5	3rd	NCAA Division I Sweet Sixteen
1987–88	Mike Krzyzewski	28–7	9–5	3rd	NCAA Division I Final Four
1988–89	Mike Krzyzewski	28–8	9–5	T–2nd	NCAA Division I Final Four
1989–90	Mike Krzyzewski	29–9	9–5	T–2nd	NCAA Division I Runner-up
1990–91	Mike Krzyzewski	32–7	11–3	1st	NCAA Division I Champion
1991–92	Mike Krzyzewski	38–2	15-1	1st	NCAA Division I Champion
1992–93	Mike Krzyzewski	24–8	10–6	T–3rd	NCAA Division I second round
1993–94	Mike Krzyzewski	28–6	12–4	1st	NCAA Division I Runner-up
1994–95	Mike Krzyzewski; Pete Gaudet	9–3; 4–15	0–1; 2–13	9th	—
1995–96	Mike Krzyzewski	18–13	8–8	T–4th	NCAA Division I first round
1996–97	Mike Krzyzewski	24–9	12–4	1st	NCAA Division I second round
1997–98	Mike Krzyzewski	32–4	15–1	1st	NCAA Division I Elite Eight
1998–99	Mike Krzyzewski	37–2	16–0	1st	NCAA Division I Runner-up
1999–2000	Mike Krzyzewski	29–5	15–1	1st	NCAA Division I Sweet Sixteen
2000–01	Mike Krzyzewski	35–4	13–3	1st	NCAA Division I Champion
2001–02	Mike Krzyzewski	31–4	13–3	2nd	NCAA Division I Sweet Sixteen
2002–03	Mike Krzyzewski	26–7	11–5	T–2nd	NCAA Division I Sweet Sixteen
2003–04	Mike Krzyzewski	31–6	13–3	1st	NCAA Division I Final Four
2004–05	Mike Krzyzewski	27–6	11–5	3rd	NCAA Division I Sweet Sixteen
2005–06	Mike Krzyzewski	34–4	14–2	1st	NCAA Division I Final Four
2006–07	Mike Krzyzewski	22–11	8–8	T–6th	NCAA Division I first round
2007–08	Mike Krzyzewski	28–6	13–3	2nd	NCAA Division I second round
2008–09	Mike Krzyzewski	30–7	11–5	T–2nd	NCAA Division I Sweet Sixteen
2009–10	Mike Krzyzewski	35–5	13–3	T–1st	NCAA Division I Champion
2010–11	Mike Krzyzewski	32–5	13–3	2nd	NCAA Division I Sweet Sixteen
2011–12	Mike Krzyzewski	27–7	13–3	2nd	NCAA Division I first round
2012–13	Mike Krzyzewski	30–6	14–4	2nd	NCAA Division I Elite Eight
2013–14	Mike Krzyzewski	26–9	13–5	3rd	NCAA Division I second round
2014–15	Mike Krzyzewski	35–4	15–3	2nd	NCAA Division I Champion
2015–16	Mike Krzyzewski	25–11	11–7	T–5th	NCAA Division I Sweet Sixteen
2016–17	Mike Krzyzewski	28–9	11–7	T–5th	NCAA Division I second round
2017–18	Mike Krzyzewski	29–8	13–5	2nd	NCAA Division I Elite Eight
2018–19	Mike Krzyzewski	32–6	14–4	3rd	NCAA Division I Elite Eight
2019–20	Mike Krzyzewski	25–6	15–5	T–2nd	No postseason held
2020–21	Mike Krzyzewski	13–11	9–9	10th	—
2021–22	Mike Krzyzewski	32–7	16–4	1st	NCAA Division I Final Four
Mike Krzyzewski:		1,129–309	466–193		
Jon Scheyer (Atlantic Coast Conference) (2022–present)
2022–23	Jon Scheyer	27–9	14–6	T–3rd	NCAA Division I second round
2023–24	Jon Scheyer	27–9	15–5	2nd	NCAA Division I Elite Eight
2024–25	Jon Scheyer	35–4	19–1	1st	NCAA Division I Final Four
2025–26	Jon Scheyer	35–3	17–1	1st	NCAA Division I Elite Eight
Jon Scheyer:		124–25	65–13		
Total:		2,370–936			
National champion Postseason invitational champion Conference regular season champion Conference regular season and conference tournament champion Division regular season champion Division regular season and conference tournament champion Conference tournament champion
