= Hugh Mills =

Hugh Mills may refer to:

- Hugh Mills (politician) (1828–1901), American businessman and politician
- Hugh Mills (rugby union) (1873–1905), New Zealand rugby union player
- Hugh Mills (writer) (1913–1971), British playwright
- Hugh L. Mills Jr., United States Army officer
