= 1967 ACC men's basketball tournament =

- Classification: Division I
- Season: 1966–67
- Teams: 8
- Site: Greensboro Coliseum; Greensboro, North Carolina
- Champions: North Carolina (2nd title)
- Winning coach: Dean Smith (1st title)
- MVP: Larry Miller (North Carolina)

1966–67 ACC men's basketball standings
	Conf.				Overall
Team	W		L	PCT	W		L	PCT
No. 4 North Carolina †	12	–	2	.857	26	–	6	.813
Duke	9	–	3	.750	18	–	9	.667
South Carolina	8	–	4	.667	16	–	7	.696
Clemson	9	–	5	.643	17	–	8	.680
Wake Forest	5	–	9	.357	9	–	18	.333
Maryland	5	–	9	.357	11	–	14	.440
Virginia	4	–	10	.286	9	–	17	.346
NC State	2	–	12	.143	7	–	19	.269
† 1967 ACC tournament winner Rankings from AP Poll

The 1967 Atlantic Coast Conference men's basketball tournament was held in Greensboro, North Carolina, at the Greensboro Coliseum, the first of 22 to be held at that venue, from March 9–11, 1967. North Carolina defeated Duke, 82–73, to win the championship. Larry Miller of North Carolina was named tournament MVP. This was the first ACC Tournament not held at Reynolds Coliseum.

North Carolina defeated all three of their in-state rivals on their way to the tournament championship, beating NC State in the quarterfinal round, Wake Forest in the semifinal, and Duke in the championship game.

== Bracket ==
Quarterfinals; March 9
1	#3 North Carolina	56
8	NC State	53
4	Clemson	61
5	Wake Forest	63^{OT}
2	Duke	99
7	Virginia	78
3	South Carolina	57
6	Maryland	54

Semifinals; March 10
1	#3 North Carolina	89
5	Wake Forest	79
2	Duke	69
3	South Carolina	66

Championship Game; March 11
1	#3 North Carolina	82
2	Duke	73
