= 1966–67 Duke Blue Devils men's basketball team =

American college basketball season

1966–67 Duke Blue Devils men's basketball

NIT Tournament, Quarterfinals
- Conference: Atlantic Coast Conference

Ranking
- Coaches: No. 19
- Record: 18–9 (9–3 ACC)
- Head coach: Vic Bubas
- Home arena: Duke Indoor Stadium

1966–67 ACC men's basketball standings
	Conf.				Overall
Team	W		L	PCT	W		L	PCT
No. 4 North Carolina †	12	–	2	.857	26	–	6	.813
Duke	9	–	3	.750	18	–	9	.667
South Carolina	8	–	4	.667	16	–	7	.696
Clemson	9	–	5	.643	17	–	8	.680
Wake Forest	5	–	9	.357	9	–	18	.333
Maryland	5	–	9	.357	11	–	14	.440
Virginia	4	–	10	.286	9	–	17	.346
NC State	2	–	12	.143	7	–	19	.269
† 1967 ACC tournament winner Rankings from AP Poll

The 1966–67 Duke Blue Devils men's basketball team represented Duke University in the 1966–67 NCAA University Division men's basketball season. The head coach was Vic Bubas and the team finished the season with an overall record of 18–9 and did not qualify for the NCAA tournament.

Having played on the freshman team the previous year, the 1966–67 season was the first season for C. B. Claiborne, the first African-American to integrate the Duke basketball team. He made his first start in a January 1967 victory over Penn State, after head coach Vic Bubas suspended nine of his players.

== Roster ==
1966–67 Duke Blue Devils men's basketball team
Players
Coaches

Pos.	#	Name	Height	Weight	Year	Hometown
G	12	Tony Barone	5 ft 9 in (1.75 m)	—	Jr	Chicago, Ill.
C	54	Warren Chapman	6 ft 8 in (2.03 m)	—	Jr
G	23	C. B. Claiborne	6 ft 2 in (1.88 m)	—	So	Danville, Va.
		Bob Francis	—	—
G	20	Dave Golden	6 ft 0 in (1.83 m)	—	So
F	40	Joe Kennedy	6 ft 6 in (1.98 m)	210 lb (95 kg)	Jr	Bowie, Md.
F	31	Tim Kolodziej	6 ft 5 in (1.96 m)	—	Jr
C	42	Mike Lewis	6 ft 7 in (2.01 m)	225 lb (102 kg)	Jr	Missoula, Mont.
F	32	Jim Liccardo	6 ft 5 in (1.96 m)	—	Sr
F	53	Fred Lind	6 ft 7 in (2.01 m)	215 lb (98 kg)	So	Highland Park, Ill.
G	21	Stu McKaig	6 ft 1 in (1.85 m)	—	Sr
F	22	Bob Riedy	6 ft 6 in (1.98 m)	215 lb (98 kg)	Sr
		Dale Stubbs	—	—
F	52	Steve Vandenberg	6 ft 7 in (2.01 m)	—	So
G	34	Bob Verga (C)	6 ft 0 in (1.83 m)	190 lb (86 kg)	Sr	Neptune Township, N.J.
G	22	Ron Wendelin	6 ft 0 in (1.83 m)	—	Jr

Head coach

Vic Bubas

Assistant coach(es)

Legend

- (C) Team captain
- (S) Suspended
- (I) Ineligible
- (W) Walk-on
- Injured
- Current redshirt

Compiled from multiple sources
