= C. B. Claiborne =

American former basketball player and professor

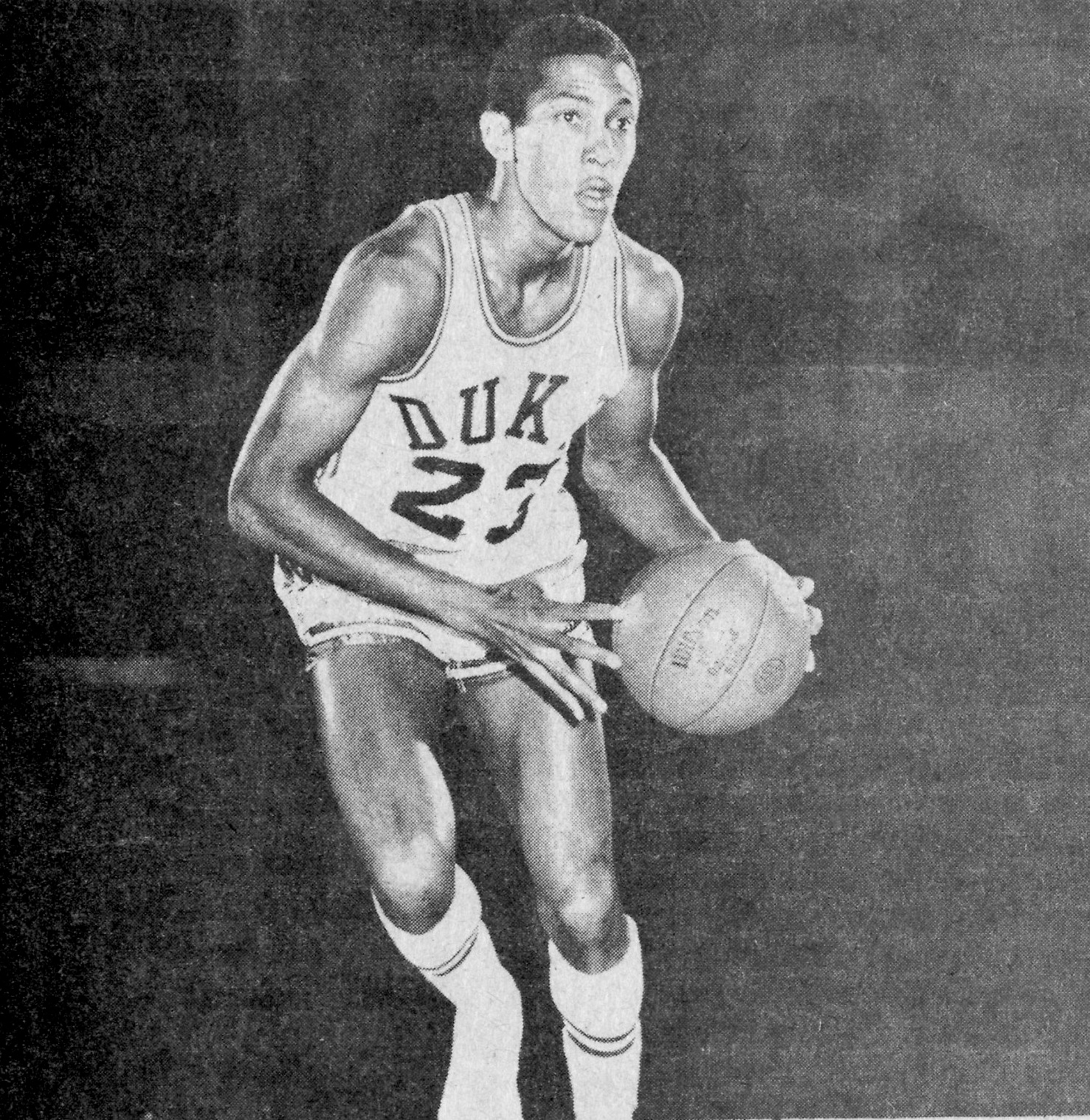
- Claiborne at Duke in 1967

Personal information
- Born: 1946 or 1947 (age 78–79) Danville, Virginia
- Listed height: 6 ft 2 in (1.88 m)

Career information
- High school: John Langston
- College: Duke (1966–1969)
- Position: Guard
- Number: 23

Claudius B. Claiborne is an American professor and former basketball player who was the first African-American to play on the Duke Blue Devils men's basketball team.

Claiborne grew up in Danville, Virginia where he attended John M. Langston High School. During his senior year in 1965, he was class president as well as captain of the baseball and basketball teams. He matriculated to Duke University on a presidential scholarship in 1965, two years after the first black students integrated at Duke. After a year on the freshman basketball team (NCAA rules prohibited freshmen on varsity teams at the time), he joined varsity men's basketball team for the 1966–67 season. He made his first start in a January 1967 victory over Penn State, after head coach Vic Bubas suspended nine of his players. In 1969, he played in a triple-overtime win against Duke's biggest rival, North Carolina.

Claiborne ultimately graduated in 1969 with a degree in engineering. He later earned further postgraduate degrees from Dartmouth College, Washington University in St. Louis, and Virginia Tech, and became a professor in the business school of Texas Southern University.

Claiborne was honored at a Duke home game on February 20, 2023, with all the Duke players wearing his name and number 23 during pre-game warmups, and Claiborne appearing at center court during halftime.
