= Ike Thomas =

American football player (born 1947)

No. 37
- Position: Cornerback / Safety

Personal information
- Born: November 4, 1947 (age 79); Calcasieu Parish, Louisiana, U.S.
- Listed height: 6 ft 2 in (1.88 m)
- Listed weight: 194 lb (88 kg)

Career information
- High school: Langston (Hot Springs, Arkansas)
- College: Bishop
- NFL draft: 1971: 2nd round, 51st overall pick

Career history
- Dallas Cowboys (1971); Green Bay Packers (1972–1973); New York Stars (1974); Charlotte Hornets (1974); Buffalo Bills (1975); Toronto Argonauts (1977); Hamilton Tiger-Cats (1978–1979)

Awards and highlights
- Super Bowl champion (VI); NAIA All-District 8 (1970)

Career NFL statistics
- Games played: 37
- Interceptions: 2
- Kick return TDs: 2
- Stats at Pro Football Reference

Isaac Thomas (born November 4, 1947) is an American former professional football player who was a cornerback in the National Football League (NFL) for the Dallas Cowboys, Green Bay Packers, and Buffalo Bills. He played college football for the Bishop Tigers and was selected in the second round of the 1971 NFL draft.

== Early life ==
Thomas attended Langston High School in Hot Springs, Arkansas. His achievements included football. He also played at Bishop College, an historically black college in Texas. As a senior, he intercepted 4 passes (2 returned for touchdowns), recovered 3 fumbles and received NAIA All-District 8 honors. He participated in the 1971 College All-Star Game against the Baltimore Colts.

== Professional career ==
=== Dallas Cowboys ===
Thomas was selected by the Dallas Cowboys in the second round (51st overall) of the 1971 NFL draft. In training camp he was tried at wide receiver. He had 2 kickoff returns for touchdowns in his rookie season. One of those returns was a franchise record 101-yard score against the New York Jets. It still stands as the record for a Cowboys rookie, and Thomas is tied with Bryan McCann and Amos Marsh for making the second-longest play in Cowboys history, behind Alexander Wright's 102-yard kickoff return against the Atlanta Falcons in 1991.

Thomas played one season with the Cowboys, averaging 42.1 yards per kickoff return, and was part of their winning team in Super Bowl VI. He was traded on September 5, 1972, to the Green Bay Packers, along with punter Ron Widby, for a 1973 second round-draft choice (#46-Golden Richards).

=== Green Bay Packers ===
Thomas continued to return kickoffs and had over 1,000 return yards in 2 seasons with the Green Bay Packers. In 1973, he was used as a wide receiver before being moved back to cornerback. He was waived on August 15, 1974.

=== New York Stars / Charlotte Hornets ===
In 1974, he signed with the New York Stars of the World Football League and was the starter at strong safety. In October, the team moved to Charlotte and was renamed as the Charlotte Hornets.

=== Buffalo Bills ===
In 1975, Thomas signed with the Buffalo Bills. That year he made his only 2 interceptions in the NFL. He was released on September 4, 1976. During his NFL career he played 37 games in 4 years, with 1,394 kickoff return yards, 2 interceptions, and 2 touchdowns.

=== Toronto Argonauts ===
In 1977, he signed with the Toronto Argonauts of the Canadian Football League and played there for one season before being released.

=== Hamilton Tiger-Cats ===
In 1978, he signed with the Hamilton Tiger-Cats of the Canadian Football League, playing most of the season before being put on the injured reserve list with a broken hand. He retired on November 14, 1979.
