= John M. Langston High School =

Former public school in Danville, Virginia

Coordinates: 36.5884°N 79.4072°W

John M. Langston High School is a former school for African Americans in Danville, Virginia. It was built in 1932. E. A. Gibson was the first principal. He was succeeded by R. L. Armstead, C. D. Paige, and John Byrd. A new school building was constructed in 1958 on Cleveland Street. In 1970, with integration, it was merged with George Washington High School and converted to a junior high school. It was renamed in 2016. C. B. Claiborne is an alumnus. Joyce Glaise wrote about her experiences at the school and growing up in the Danville community.

Westmoreland High School preceded it.

It was one of many high schools for African Americans converted to serve lower grades after integration. A book on Danville has a photo of the school.

== Notable alumni ==
- Jim Mitchell (defensive lineman), American football player
- C. B. Claiborne, basketball player
