= Duke Blue Devils women's basketball =

College women's basketball team representing Duke University

2026–27 Duke Blue Devils women's basketball team
- University: Duke University
- Head coach: Kara Lawson (7th season)
- Location: Durham, North Carolina
- Arena: Cameron Indoor Stadium (capacity: 9,314)
- Conference: Atlantic Coast Conference
- Nickname: Blue Devils
- Colors: Duke blue and white
- Student section: Cameron Crazies
- All-time record: 1061–471 (.693)

NCAA Division I tournament runner-up
- 1999, 2006
Other NCAA Division I tournament results
Final Four	1999, 2002, 2003, 2006
Elite Eight	1998, 1999, 2002, 2003, 2004, 2005, 2006, 2010, 2011, 2012, 2013, 2025, 2026
Sweet Sixteen	1998, 1999, 2000, 2001, 2002, 2003, 2004, 2005, 2006, 2007, 2008, 2010, 2011, 2012, 2013, 2015, 2018, 2024, 2025, 2026
Appearances	1987, 1995, 1996, 1997, 1998, 1999, 2000, 2001, 2002, 2003, 2004, 2005, 2006, 2007, 2008, 2009, 2010, 2011, 2012, 2013, 2014, 2015, 2017, 2018, 2023, 2024, 2025, 2026

Conference tournament champions
- 2000, 2001, 2002, 2003, 2004, 2010, 2011, 2013, 2025, 2026

Conference regular-season champions
- 1998, 1999, 2001, 2002, 2003, 2004, 2005, 2007, 2010, 2011, 2012, 2013, 2026

Uniforms
Home	Away	Alternate

The Duke Blue Devils women's basketball team is the college basketball program representing Duke University in the Atlantic Coast Conference of NCAA Division I.

== Notable players ==
=== WNBA ===
Many Duke Women's Basketball players have continued their basketball careers professionally through WNBA and overseas. As of 2016, 10 former Blue Devils were represented on WNBA Teams. Among those Duke alums include, Mistie Bass ('06, Phoenix Mercury), Alana Beard (‘04, Los Angeles Sparks), Karima Christmas-Kelly (‘11, Minnesota Lynx), Monique Currie ('06, Washington Mystics), Chelsea Gray ('14, Los Angeles Sparks), Lindsey Harding (‘07, Phoenix Mercury), Tricia Liston ('14, Minnesota Lynx), Haley Peters ('14, Atlanta Dream), Jasmine Thomas (‘11, Connecticut Sun), Krystal Thomas (‘11, Washington Mystics), and Elizabeth Williams ('15, Atlanta Dream).

The Minnesota Lynx were crowned WNBA champs in 2015 with Tricia Liston on the roster. In 2016, the Los Angeles Sparks won the WNBA championship with Alana Beard and Chelsea Gray on the roster. Also the Los Vegas Aces won the WNBA championship in 2022 with Chelsea Gray on the team claiming her second title

=== Overseas ===
Duke Women's Basketball had 14 former players playing professionally overseas in the 2016–2017 season. The former Blue Devils that played overseas included, Alana Beard (Duke ‘04, Avenida, Spain), Chante Black (Duke '09, Ramat Hasharon, Israel), Karima Christmas (Duke ‘11, Winnus, South Korea), Monique Currie (Duke ‘06, Woori Bank, South Korea), Chelsea Gray (Duke '14, Abdullah Gul, Turkey), Lindsey Harding (Duke ‘07, Besiktas, Turkey), Haley Peters (Duke ‘14, Girona, Spain), Angela Salvadores (Duke '16, Avenida, Spain), Kathleen Scheer (Duke '12, Hobart Chargers, Australia), Shay Selby (Duke '12, Bodrum, Turkey), Jasmine Thomas (Duke ‘11, Ramat Hasharon), Allison Vernerey (Duke '13, A.S.V. Basket, France), Chloe Wells (Duke ‘14, Araski, Spain), and Elizabeth Williams (Duke '15, Nadezhda Orenburg, Russia).

== Year by year results ==
Season	Team	Overall	Conference	Standing	Postseason	Coaches' poll	AP poll
Emma Jean Howard (Independent) (1975–1978)
1975–76	Emma Jean Howard	0–14	–				
1976–77	Emma Jean Howard	2–12	–		NCAIAW Tournament		
Emma Jean Howard:		2–26 (.071)					
Atlantic Coast Conference
Debbie Leonard (Atlantic Coast Conference) (1977–1992)
1977–78	Debbie Leonard	1–19	0–8	7th	NCAIAW Tournament		
1978–79	Debbie Leonard	11–11	3–6	5th	NCAIAW Tournament		
1979–80	Debbie Leonard	14–13	5–5	T-4th	NCAIAW Tournament		
1980–81	Debbie Leonard	11–14	3–6	6th	NCAIAW Tournament		
1981–82	Debbie Leonard	14–15	3–8	6th	AIAW Region II Tournament		
1982–83	Debbie Leonard	15–10	6–7	4th			
1983–84	Debbie Leonard	13–14	5–9	6th			
1984–85	Debbie Leonard	19–8	7–7	5th			
1985–86	Debbie Leonard	21–9	9–5	3rd	NWIT Fourth Place		
1986–87	Debbie Leonard	19–10	7–7	4th	NCAA Second Round (Play-In)		
1987–88	Debbie Leonard	17–11	5–9	5th			
1988–89	Debbie Leonard	12–16	2–12	7th			
1989–90	Debbie Leonard	15–13	4–10	T-6th			
1990–91	Debbie Leonard	16–12	6–8	5th			
1991–92	Debbie Leonard	14–15	4–12	8th			
Debbie Leonard:		212–190 (.527)	69–119 (.367)				
Gail Goestenkors (Atlantic Coast Conference) (1992–2007)
1992–93	Gail Goestenkors	12–15	3–13	9th			
1993–94	Gail Goestenkors	16–11	7–9	5th			
1994–95	Gail Goestenkors	22–9	10–6	4th	NCAA Second Round	17	20
1995–96	Gail Goestenkors	26–7	12–4	2nd	NCAA Second Round	19	13
1996–97	Gail Goestenkors	19–11	9–7	T-3rd	NCAA Second Round		
1997–98	Gail Goestenkors	24–8	13–3	1st	NCAA Elite Eight	7	8
1998–99	Gail Goestenkors	29–7	15–1	1st	NCAA Runner-Up	10	10
1999–2000	Gail Goestenkors	28–6	12–4	2nd#	NCAA Sweet Sixteen	11	10
2000–01	Gail Goestenkors	30–4	13–3	1st#	NCAA Sweet Sixteen	8	5
2001–02	Gail Goestenkors	31–4	16–0	1st#	NCAA Final Four	4	3
2002–03	Gail Goestenkors	35–2	16–0	1st#	NCAA Final Four	4	2
2003–04	Gail Goestenkors	30–4	15–1	1st#	NCAA Elite Eight	5	1
2004–05	Gail Goestenkors	31–5	12–2	T-1st	NCAA Elite Eight	8	7
2005–06	Gail Goestenkors	31–4	12–2	T-2nd	NCAA Runner-Up	2	4
2006–07	Gail Goestenkors	32–2	14–0	1st	NCAA Sweet Sixteen	6	1
Gail Goestenkors:		396–99 (.800)	179–55 (.765)				
Joanne P. McCallie (Atlantic Coast Conference) (2007–2020)
2007–08	Joanne P. McCallie	25–10	10–4	T-3rd	NCAA Sweet Sixteen	9	9
2008–09	Joanne P. McCallie	27–6	11–3	3rd	NCAA Second Round	14	6
2009–10	Joanne P. McCallie	30–6	12–2	T-1st#	NCAA Elite Eight	6	6
2010–11	Joanne P. McCallie	32–4	12–2	T-1st#	NCAA Elite Eight	7	6
2011–12	Joanne P. McCallie	27–6	15–1	1st	NCAA Elite Eight	6	6
2012–13	Joanne P. McCallie	33–3	17–1	1st#	NCAA Elite Eight	5	5
2013–14	Joanne P. McCallie	28–7	12–4	T-2nd	NCAA Second Round	9	10
2014–15	Joanne P. McCallie	23–11	11–5	T-4th	NCAA Sweet Sixteen	16	12
2015–16	Joanne P. McCallie	20–12	8–8	T-7th			
2016–17	Joanne P. McCallie	28–6	13–3	T-2nd	NCAA Second Round	9	9
2017–18	Joanne P. McCallie	24–9	11–5	T-4th	NCAA Sweet Sixteen	20	12
2018–19	Joanne P. McCallie	15–15	6–10	T-10th			
2019–20	Joanne P. McCallie	18–12	12–6	3rd	Postseason cancelled (Note: Due to the COVID-19 pandemic, the 2020 NCAA tournament was cancelled entirely.)	RV	RV
Joanne P. McCallie:		330–107 (.755)	150–56 (.728)				
Kara Lawson (Atlantic Coast Conference) (2020–present)
2020–21	Kara Lawson	3–1	0–1		Opted out due to COVID-19		
2021–22	Kara Lawson	17–13	7–11	10th			
2022–23	Kara Lawson	26–7	14–4	T-2nd	NCAA Second Round		16
2023–24	Kara Lawson	22–12	11–7	7th	NCAA Sweet Sixteen	17	21
2024–25	Kara Lawson	29–8	14–4	3rd	NCAA Elite Eight	7	7
2025–26	Kara Lawson	27–9	16–2	1st	NCAA Elite Eight	5	5
Kara Lawson:		124–49 (.717)	62–29 (.681)				
Total:		1064–472 (.693)					
National champion Postseason invitational champion Conference regular season champion Conference regular season and conference tournament champion Division regular season champion Division regular season and conference tournament champion Conference tournament champion

== Postseason results ==
Duke has appeared in 28 NCAA tournaments with a record of 66–28.

Year	Seed	Round	Opponent	Result
1987	#7	First Round; Second Round	#10 Manhattan #2 Rutgers	W 70–55; L 78–64
1995	#5	First Round; Second Round	#12 Oklahoma State #4 Alabama	W 76–64; L 121–120 (4OT)
1996	#4	First Round; Second Round	#13 James Madison #12 San Francisco	W 85–53; L 64–60
1997	#5	First Round; Second Round	#12 DePaul #4 Illinois	W 70–56; L 67–65
1998	#2	First Round; Second Round; Sweet Sixteen; Elite Eight	#15 Middle Tennessee State #10 Louisville #3 Florida #9 Arkansas	W 92–67; W 69–53; W 71–58; L 77–72
1999	#3	First Round; Second Round; Sweet Sixteen; Elite Eight; Final Four; Championship	#14 Holy Cross #11 St. Joseph's #2 Old Dominion #1 Tennessee #3 Georgia #1 Purdue	W 79–51; W 66–60; W 76–63; W 69–63; W 81–69; L 62–45
2000	#2	First Round; Second Round; Sweet Sixteen	#15 Campbell #10 Western Kentucky #3 LSU	W 71–42; W 90–70; L 79–66
2001	#1	First Round; Second Round; Sweet Sixteen	#16 Milwaukee #9 Arkansas #5 SW Missouri State	W 95–63; W 75–54; L 81–71
2002	#1	First Round; Second Round; Sweet Sixteen; Elite Eight; Final Four	#16 Norfolk State #8 TCU #4 Texas #3 USC #1 Oklahoma	W 95–48; W 76–66; W 62–46; W 77–68; L 86–71
2003	#1	First Round; Second Round; Sweet Sixteen; Elite Eight; Final Four	#16 Georgia State #8 Utah #5 Georgia #2 Texas Tech #1 Tennessee	W 66–48; W 65–54; W 66–63; W 80–79; L 56–66
2004	#1	First Round; Second Round; Sweet Sixteen; Elite Eight	#16 Northwestern State #9 Marquette #5 Louisiana Tech #7 Minnesota	W 103–51; W 76–67; W 63–49; L 82–75
2005	#2	First Round; Second Round; Sweet Sixteen; Elite Eight	#15 Canisius #7 Boston College #6 Georgia #1 LSU	W 80–48; W 70–65; W 63–57; L 59–49
2006	#1	First Round; Second Round; Sweet Sixteen; Elite Eight; Final Four; Championship	#16 Southern #8 USC #4 Michigan State #2 Connecticut #1 LSU #1 Maryland	W 96–27; W 85–51; W 86–61; W 63–61 (OT); W 64–45; L 78–75 (OT)
2007	#1	First Round; Second Round; Sweet Sixteen	#16 Holy Cross #8 Temple #4 Rutgers	W 81–44; W 62–52; L 53–52
2008	#3	First Round; Second Round; Sweet Sixteen	#14 Murray State #6 Arizona State #3 Texas A&M	W 78–57; W 67–59; L 77–63
2009	#1	First Round; Second Round	#16 Austin Peay #9 Michigan State	W 83–42; L 63–49
2010	#2	First Round; Second Round; Sweet Sixteen; Elite Eight	#15 Hampton #7 LSU #11 San Diego State #4 Baylor	W 72–37; W 60–52; W 66–58; L 51–48
2011	#2	First Round; Second Round; Sweet Sixteen; Elite Eight	#15 Tennessee-Martin #10 Marist #3 DePaul #1 Connecticut	W 90–45; W 71–66; W 70–63; L 75–40
2012	#2	First Round; Second Round; Sweet Sixteen; Elite Eight	#15 Samford #7 Vanderbilt #3 St. John's #1 Stanford	W 82–47; W 96–80; W 74–47; L 81–69
2013	#2	First Round; Second Round; Sweet Sixteen; Elite Eight	#15 Hampton #7 Oklahoma State #6 Nebraska #1 Notre Dame	W 67–51; W 68–59; W 53–45; L 87–76
2014	#2	First Round; Second Round	#15 Winthrop #7 DePaul	W 87–45; L 74–65
2015	#4	First Round; Second Round; Sweet Sixteen	#13 Albany #5 Mississippi State #1 Maryland	W 54–52; W 64–56; L 65–55
2017	#2	First Round; Second Round	#15 Hampton #10 Oregon	W 94–31; L 74–65
2018	#5	First Round; Second Round; Sweet Sixteen	#12 Belmont #4 Georgia #1 Connecticut	W 72–58; W 66–40; L 72–59
2023	#3	First Round; Second Round	#14 Iona #6 Colorado	W 89–49; L 61–53 (OT)
2024	#7	First Round; Second Round; Sweet Sixteen	#10 Richmond #2 Ohio State #3 Connecticut	W 72–61; W 75–63; L 53–45
2025	#2	First Round; Second Round; Sweet Sixteen; Elite Eight	#15 Lehigh #10 Oregon #3 North Carolina #1 South Carolina	W 86–25; W 59–53; W 47–38; L 50–54
2026	#3	First Round; Second Round; Sweet Sixteen; Elite Eight	#14 Charleston #6 Baylor #2 LSU #1 UCLA	W 81–64; W 69–46; W 87–85; L 58–70

== Retired numbers ==
Duke Blue Devils retired numbers
No.	Player	Position	Career	Year of Retirement
1	Elizabeth Williams	C/F	2011-15	2016
10	Lindsey Harding	G	2002-07	2008
20	Alana Beard	G/F	2000-04	2004

== Roster ==
2026–27 Duke Blue Devils women's basketball team
Players
Coaches

Pos.	#	Name	Height	Year	Previous school	Hometown
G	0	Sanai Green	6 ft 0 in (1.83 m)	Fr	Long Island Lutheran	Richmond, VA
G/F	2	Jadyn Donovan	6 ft 0 in (1.83 m)	Sr	Sidwell Friends	Upper Marlboro, MD
G	4	Riley Nelson	6 ft 2 in (1.88 m)	RS Jr	Maryland	Clarksburg, MD
G	5	Emilee Skinner	6 ft 0 in (1.83 m)	RS Fr	Ridgeline	Providence, UT
G	7	Aaliyah Crump	6 ft 1 in (1.85 m)	So	Texas	Minnetonka, MN
G	11	Autumn Fleary	5 ft 7 in (1.7 m)	Fr	Sidwell Friends	Baltimore, MD
F	11	Delaney Thomas	6 ft 3 in (1.91 m)	Sr	St. John's College	Charles Town, WV
F	13	Jordan Wood	6 ft 4 in (1.93 m)	Sr	Carmel Catholic	Chicago, IL
G	15	Emma Koabel	5 ft 11 in (1.8 m)		Niagara Prep	Port Colborne, Ontario
C	21	Arianna Roberson	6 ft 4 in (1.93 m)	RS So	Clark	San Antonio, TX
G	22	Bella Flemings	6 ft 0 in (1.83 m)	Fr	William J. Brennan	San Antonio, TX
F	33	Taylor Sofilkanich	6 ft 4 in (1.93 m)	Fr	St. John Vanney	South Amboy, NJ
F	35	Toby Fournier	6 ft 2 in (1.88 m)	Jr	Crestwood Prep	Toronto, Ontario
G	53	Olivia Martin	5 ft 6 in (1.68 m)		Quince Orchard	Gaithersburg, MD

Head coach

- Kara Lawson (Tennessee)

Assistant coach(es)

- Tia Jackson (Iowa)
- Kyra Elzy (Tennessee)
- Karen Lange (Iowa)
- Karen Middleton (South Carolina)
- Pierre Miller (Presbyterian)

Legend

- (C) Team captain
- (S) Suspended
- (I) Ineligible
- (W) Walk-on
- Injured
- Current redshirt

Roster
Last update: August 29, 2026
