= Hugh L. Mills Jr. =

Retired Army Officer of U.S

- Born: Hot Springs, Arkansas
- Military career
- Allegiance: United States
- Branch: United States Army
- Service years: 1967–1993
- Rank: Lieutenant Colonel
- Nickname: Darkhorse 1-6
- Conflicts: Vietnam War
- Awards: Silver Star (3); Legion of Merit; Distinguished Flying Cross (4); Bronze Star Medal (3); Purple Heart (3)

Lieutenant Colonel Hugh L. Mills Jr. is a retired United States Army officer who served in the Vietnam War.

== Early life ==
Mills was one of four children born to Hugh L. Mills, an educator, and his wife Don McCollum Mills in Hot Springs, Arkansas. He graduated from Hot Springs High School in 1966.

== Military career ==
Mills enlisted in the United States Army on 1 February 1967 and after attending Officer Candidate School at Fort Knox was commissioned as an armor officer on 15 December. He was then assigned as a training officer with the 5th Reconnaissance Squadron. He completed Army aviation training in late 1968.

Mills arrived in South Vietnam in January 1969, and was assigned to D Troop, 1st Squadron, 4th Cavalry Regiment, 1st Infantry Division, first flying UH-1 Hueys before transitioning to the OH-6A Cayuse and becoming scout platoon commander. Major General Albert E. Milloy, commanding general of the 1st Infantry Division, described Mills as "the most courageous small unit leader in the First Infantry Division with the highest kill ratio of any combat unit in the Big Red One."

Following his first tour in South Vietnam, Mills served with the 2nd Battalion, 64th Armor Regiment, 3rd Infantry Division, in West Germany. In September 1971 he returned to South Vietnam flying the AH-1G Cobra gunship with D Troop, 3rd Squadron, 5th Cavalry Regiment and then flew OH-6As as platoon commander of C Troop, 16th Cavalry Regiment, 1st Aviation Brigade. On 30 January 1972 his AH-1 was shot down as it attempted to attack a People's Army of Vietnam (PAVN) antiaircraft artillery site in northwest Quảng Trị Province. Mills and his gunner were rescued after a day on the ground trapped in the wreckage.

Mills flew over 2000 combat hours in the OH-6 and more than 1300 combat hours in the AH-1 in Vietnam. He was shot down 16 times, 15 times in the OH-6.

On his return to the United States, Mills served with the 2nd Squadron, 1st Cavalry Regiment, 2nd Armored Division, at Fort Hood, Texas and then with the 8th Aviation Battalion (Attack Helicopter) in West Germany. In 1975 he received a Bachelor of Arts in aeronautical studies from Embry–Riddle Aeronautical University. In 1978 he was assigned to the aviation unit that would become 160th Special Operations Aviation Regiment (Airborne). In 1980 he received a masters of public administration from Central Michigan University. His final posting was as army representative to the Federal Aviation Administration.

== Later life ==
After retiring from the army in 1993, Mills co-wrote the book Low Level Hell about his experiences as a scout pilot in South Vietnam. He worked for Cedar Fair for 15 years as director of general services. He also flew helicopters for the Kansas City Police Department. He later became Undersheriff with the Jackson County Missouri Sheriff's office.

In 2015 Mills returned to Vietnam to research a sequel to his book and met members of the PAVN unit that had shot him down in 1972. The trip was also part of a planned documentary film.

== Decorations ==
Mills' decorations include the Silver Star (3), Legion of Merit, Distinguished Flying Cross (4), Bronze Star Medal (3), Purple Heart (3), Air Medal (66), Air Medal with 'V' Device (6), Vietnamese Gallantry Cross with Silver Star and Palm, Vietnamese Armed Forces Honor Medal First Class and the Vietnamese Civil Actions Medal First Class.

== Honors ==
In 2011 Mills was inducted into the Army Aviation Hall of Fame. In 2013 he was added to the Arkansas Walk of Fame.

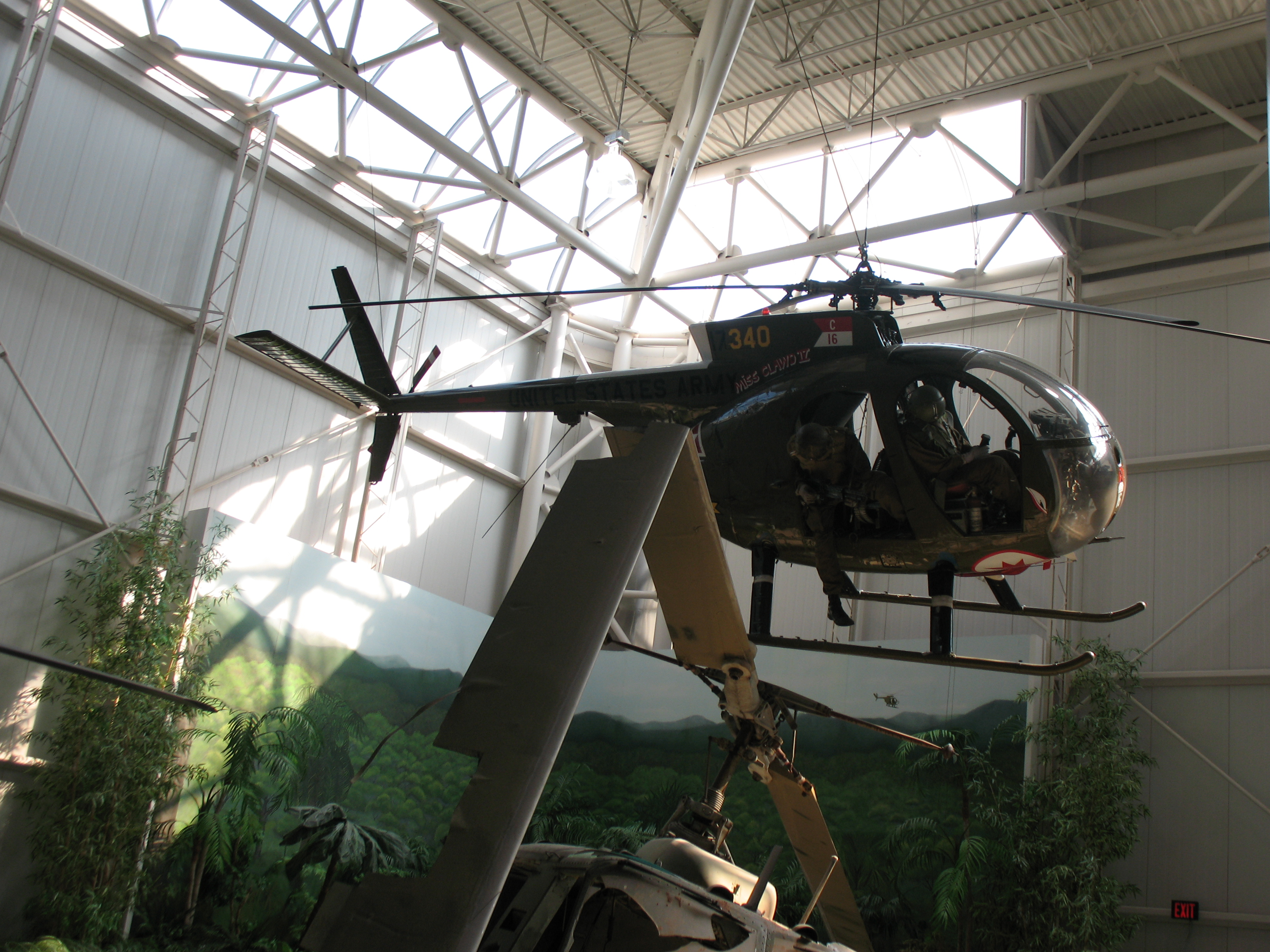
OH-6 painted as Mills' Miss Clawd IV at the Army Aviation Museum

The United States Army Aviation Museum’s OH-6 is painted in the colors of Mills' Miss Clawd IV (his OH-6A when he was with C Troop, 16th Cavalry).
