= Mamie Phipps Clark =

American social psychologist (1917–1983)

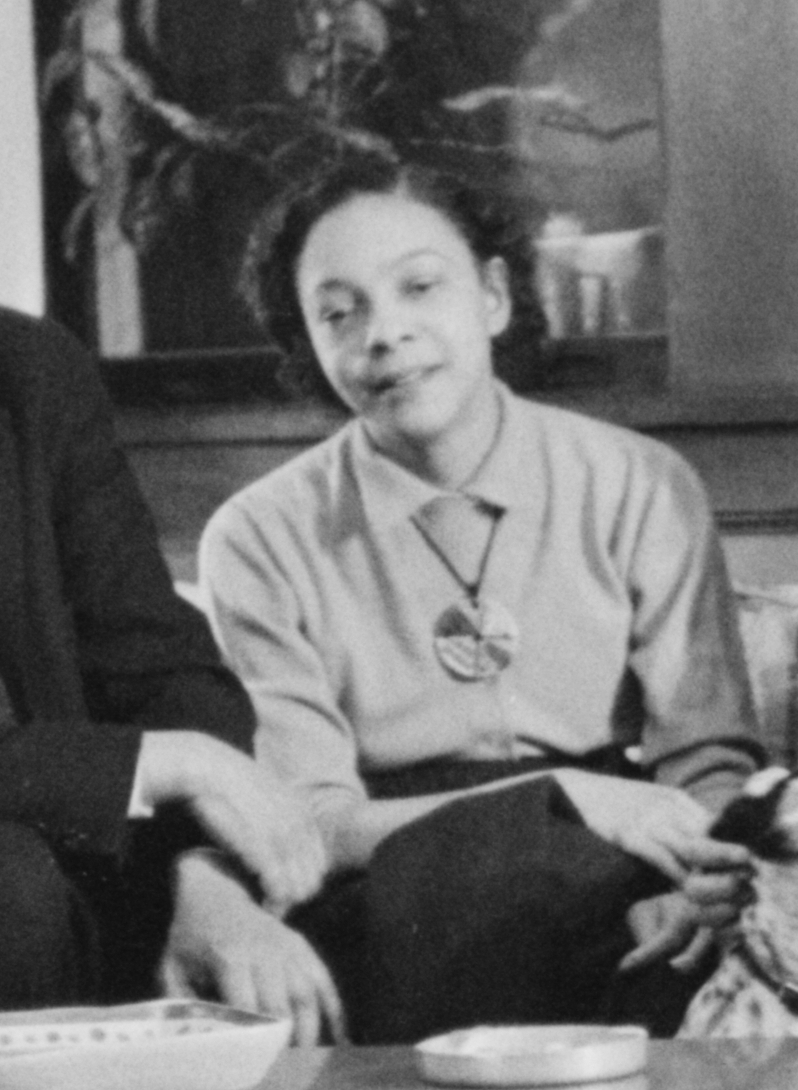
- Born: October 18, 1917; Hot Springs, Arkansas, U.S.
- Died: August 11, 1983 (aged 65); New York, New York, U.S.
- Resting place: Mount Hope Cemetery Hastings-on-Hudson, New York, U.S.
- Education: B.A. in Psychology, Howard University M.A. in Psychology, Howard University Ph.D. in Psychology, Columbia University
- Occupation: Social psychologist
- Known for: Psychology Research supporting 1954 U.S Supreme Court case Brown v. Board of Education of Topeka, Kansas
- Spouse: Kenneth Clark
- Children: Kate Harris and Hilton Clark

Mamie Phipps Clark (October 18, 1917 – August 11, 1983) was a social psychologist who, along with her husband Kenneth Clark, focused on the development of self-consciousness in black preschool children. Clark was born and raised in Hot Springs, Arkansas. Clark received her post-secondary education at Howard University, and she earned her bachelor's and master's degrees there.

For her master's thesis, known as "The Development of Consciousness of Self in Negro Pre-School Children," Clark worked with black Arkansas preschool children. This work included doll experiments that investigated the way African American children's attitudes toward race and racial self-identification were affected by segregation. According to the study, children who attended segregated schools preferred playing with white dolls over black dolls. The study was highly influential in the Brown v. Board of Education court case.

== Early life ==
Born on October 18, 1917, in Hot Springs, Arkansas, Mamie Phipps attended highly segregated schools, including a Catholic elementary school. Her father, Harold H. Phipps, born in the British West Indies, was a well-respected physician and a manager of a resort. Phipps's mother, Katy Florence Phipps, was a homemaker and she was often involved in her husband's work as a physician. As a result, she did not need to work to supplement the family income. Her younger brother became a dentist.

I had a very happy childhood. I really did. We were comfortable. How can I tell you I had a happy childhood? I enjoyed everything. I enjoyed school. I loved school. I enjoyed recreation. I enjoyed the little traveling we did. I was very happy. I can't say it was impoverished, or—for me, it was privileged. For me. Now, by objective standards, I would guess you would say it was just an average family. But it was a very privileged childhood. (as cited in Lal, 2002, p. 1)

Clark graduated from Langston High School, even though it was very uncommon for a black student to do so. She received two offers and scholarships from black prestigious universities, Fisk University and Howard University. She enrolled at Howard in 1934. Despite her attending college during the Great Depression, her father was able to send her $50 per month, equivalent to about $1,200 today. She majored in math and minored in physics. It was highly unusual for black women to receive an education in those departments at the time.

At Howard University, Mamie Phipps Clark met her future husband, Kenneth Bancroft Clark, who was a master's degree student in psychology. It was Kenneth Clark who urged her to pursue psychology because it would allow her to explore her interest in working with children. Phipps once stated "I'd always had an interest in children. Always from the time I was very small. I'd always thought I wanted to work with children, and psychology seemed a good field."

Mamie Phipps and Kenneth Bancroft Clark eloped during her senior year in 1937. In 1938, Mamie Phipps Clark graduated magna cum laude from Howard University. After she immediately enrolled in Howard University's psychology graduate program. For her master's thesis, she studied when black children became aware of themselves as having a distinct "self," as well as when they became aware of belonging to a particular racial group. She defined "race consciousness" as the perception of self-belonging to a specific group, which is differentiated from other groups by obvious physical characteristics. Her conclusions about African American children became the foundation and the guiding premise for the famous doll studies which her and her husband would later become very well known for. Phipps confessed that it was not until the end of her undergraduate years that she finally became confident about creating solutions for segregation and racial oppression. The summer after her graduation Phipps worked as a secretary in the law office of Charles Houston, who was a prominent lawyer and leading civil rights figure at a time when segregation cases were being taken up by the national Association for the Advancement Colored People legal defense fund. There she witnessed the work of William Hastie, Thurgood Marshall, and others in preparation for the court challenges that would lead to the landmark 1954 decision Brown v. Board of Education. As she later noted: "I can't even remember the names of them all, but they converged in his office to prepare these cases and that was the most marvelous learning experience I ever had- in the whole sense of really, blasphemy, to blacks, was brought very clearly to me in that office." This had an influence on her master's thesis, "The Development of Consciousness of Self in Negro Pre-School Children," which would later be responsible for the research and experiments which influenced the Supreme Court Case, Brown v. Board of Education.

Clark received a three year Rosenwald Fellowship in 1940-1942 which she used to study the extent to which color influenced how African American children felt about themselves, as part of her PhD studies at Columbia University. Her dissertation was entitled, "Changes in Primary Mental Abilities with Age". Clark was the first Black woman to earn her Ph.D. in experimental psychology, which she did in 1943. Phipps Clark's dissertation adviser was Henry E. Garrett, later president of the American Psychological Association. He is noted as an exceptional statistician but also an open racist. Later on in her career, she was asked to testify in the Prince Edward County, Virginia, desegregation case in order to rebut his testimony offered in that court in support of inherent racial differences.

After graduation, she experienced a lot of frustration career-wise. She attributed this to the "unwanted anomaly" of being a Black woman in a field dominated by white males. One instrumental role was a job in 1945 conducting psychological testing for homeless black girls for the Riverdale Home for Children. Here, she created and carried out psychological tests, as well as counseling homeless African Americans and other minority children in New York City: "I think Riverdale had a profound effect on me, because I was never aware that there were that many children who were just turned out you know, or whose parents had just left them, so to speak."

== Doll study ==
Phipps Clark's doll study expanded upon the research she conducted for her master's thesis. The thesis had been influenced by Ruth and Gene Horowitz's investigations into "self-identification" among nursery school children. Her thesis not only sparked her husband Kenneth Clark's interest in the topic but also laid foundation for their late collaborative studies on the racial preferences of Black children. Although the thesis contained significant findings, she chose not to publish it because she felt it would be exploitative to do so under a professor's name. Instead, she told Kenneth that they would publish the work together.

The doll experiment ultimately became a pivotal piece of evidence in the legal battle that culminated in the Supreme Court's 1954 Brown v. Board of Education decision, demonstrating that segregation inflicted psychological harm on children. Mamie Phipps Clark and Kenneth Clark had originally conducted the study fourteen years earlier. Its results became the first social science research ever presented as hard evidence in the Court's history.

The study used four dolls identical in all ways except color. It was administered to children ages 3–7, asking questions to identify racial perception and preference. The following questions were asked:

"Show me the doll that you like the best or that you'd like to play with."

"Show me the doll that is the 'nice' doll."

"Show me the doll that looks 'bad.'"

"Give me the doll that looks like a white child."

"Give me the doll that looks like a colored child."

"Give me the doll that looks like a Negro child."

"Give me the doll that looks like you."

The experiment showed that children consistently preferred the white doll across all questions and assigned positive characteristics to it. From these results, the Clarks concluded that prejudice, discrimination, and segregation caused Black children to internalize feelings of inferiority and self-hatred. Phipps Clark further explained that "if society says it is better to be White, not only White people but Negroes come to believe it," nothing that a child may attempt to escape this imposed sense of inferiority by denying their own race." The original study paved the way for later experiments conducted jointly by Phipps Clark and her husband. In an expanded investigation, she interviewed three hundred children from segregated school districts across the country and found the same patterns of preferences.

As an additional component of the doll study, Phipps Clark provided children with outline drawings of a boy and a girl and instructed them to color the figures to match their own skin tone. Many Black children colored the figures white or yellow.

Subsequent analyses of the doll study emphasized its significance because of its status as one of the first empirical demonstrations of how societal structure shapes children's developing racial identity. Later researchers contextualized the work within the current research on stereotype internalization and social identity formation; in it, children demonstrated that they absorbed cultural messages about status well before being able to articulate it. Other scholars have observed that the simplicity of the study, though groundbreaking at the time, underlined the need for more differentiated measures of self-concept in young children and encouraged expansion of methodologies in later developmental research.

The results of both the doll tests and the broader segregation-related studies demonstrated that school segregation had harmful effects on children. The study's methodology used dolls that were identical in every aspect except for skin color.

Photographer Gordon Parks, another Rosenwald Fellowship recipient, photographed one of the doll studies for Ebony magazine in July 1947.

== Additional research ==
Mamie and her husband conducted multiple studies prior to their famous doll study. In 1939, they conducted a study to determine when self- consciousness, specifically racial consciousness develops in African American children. Segregated African American children ages 3–5 years were given line drawings of white and colored boys, along with line drawings of different animals. Children were then asked to identify which picture described themselves or someone close to them. The results of their study showed that some 3-year-old children chose animals to describe themselves, while 4-year-old children do not. This suggests that around the age of 4, children begin to understand that they are distinctly human which the researchers suggest develops before children understand that they are a part of certain groups of individuals. In addition, the study found that children begin to identify themselves as white or colored around the same age. There was an increase in colored identification in the 4-year-old children compared to the 3-year-old children, however, this trend was not significant between 4 and 5-year-old children. The researchers did not believe that children stop continuing their racial identity development at age 5, but they suggested that their way of measuring this was not advanced enough to capture this development.

The Clarks's work allowed future researchers to use similar methodology and expand on the couple's research. Jensen and Tisak (2020) cited the Clarks' study and used a similar methodology to find that white preschoolers preferred white girls and non white preschoolers preferred non white girls, expanding on the idea that young children racially identifying themselves, adding that children prefer others that fit their racial identity.

== The Northside Center for Child Development ==
In February 1946, Mamie Phipps Clark founded the Northside Center for Child Development in the basement of the Paul Lawrence Dunbar apartments, where her family lived. It was funded by a loan of $946 from Mamie's father, Harold Phipps. Originally named the Northside Testing and Consultation Center, the institution became the Northside Center for Child Development in 1948. It was the first facility in Harlem to offer therapeutic services specifically for children, while also assisting families who required housing support. Dr. Clark used the center as a foundation for developing her theory linking social welfare practices with psychological perspectives on child development. Through this work, she brought essential attention to the psychological needs of children of color and highlighted the social and psychological consequences of racism.

During this period, psychoanalysis dominated therapeutic practice, but the Clarks rejected its effectiveness for the community served by the center. Believing that the children required services that Psychoanalysis could not provide, they adopted a more comprehensive, holistic model of care. After its first year of operation, Northside was offering psychiatric treatment to 64 children and remedial academic support to 45 others. By the following year, these numbers had more than doubled, and the center expanded its services to include psychological testing for 80 children (Lal, 2002).

Over time, the center broadened its programs to include psychological consultations for behavioral issues stemming from emotional disturbances, vocational guidance for adolescents, parenting education for Black families, and a range of psychological assessments. Its mission grew to address not only psychological difficulties but also the moral challenges faced by people of color face. Today, Northside provides multicultural psychological services, tutoring in reading and math, nutritional workshops, and parental training within the Harlem community. Clark remained actively involved as director of the center until her retirement in 1979.

== Harlem Youth Opportunities Unlimited project (HARYOU) ==
She continued to collaborate with her husband on numerous projects, including the Harlem Youth Opportunities Unlimited project (HARYOU), to provide education and employment opportunities for the youth in Harlem. It was established in 1962 with the help of Kenneth Clark and other community leaders. HARYOU provided corrective/remedial education for impoverished youth who were falling behind in school, provided job opportunities for Black youth, and taught residents how to work with government agencies to obtain funds and services. Kenneth Clark proposed busing to integrate schools, but protests from parents on both sides prevented this.

== Personal life ==
Mamie Phipps and Kenneth Clark married within the year after she graduated with her B.S. The Clarks were married until her death on August 11, 1983. She died at the age of 66, leaving behind two children, Kate Harris and Hilton Clark.

Clark was very active in her community. She served as chairman of a housing company that built apartments in NYC. She also served on the board of the American Broadcasting Companies, the Museum of Modern Art, the New York Public Library, New York Mission Society, The Phelps Stokes Fund, Teachers College at Columbia University, and was a Commissioner of the Palisades Interstate Park Commission. Additionally, she served with advisory groups including the National Head Start Planning Committee.

== Legacy ==
Phipps Clark's legacy and recognition of her contribution to the academic research world remains diminished today. Phipps Clark faced both gendered and racial obstacles in her career yet she continued to work despite these challenges of intersectionality in the psychological field. It has been noted that she adhered to feminine expectations of the time and often took care to "remain in the shadows of her husband's limelight" and often presented as shy. She has been praised for achieving success professionally while maintaining the satisfaction of a fulfilling home life. She received a Candace Award for Humanitarianism from the National Coalition of 100 Black Women in 1983.

Mamie Phipps Clark died of cancer on August 11, 1983, aged 66.

== See also ==
- Kenneth and Mamie Clark
