= 1967 National Invitation Tournament =

Annual NCAA basketball competition

- Season: 1966–67
- Teams: 14
- Finals site: Madison Square Garden, New York City
- Champions: Southern Illinois Salukis (1st title)
- Runner-up: Marquette Warriors (1st title game)
- Semifinalists: Rutgers Scarlet Knights (1st semifinal); Marshall Thundering Herd (1st semifinal)
- Winning coach: Jack Hartman (1st title)
- MVP: Walt Frazier (Southern Illinois)

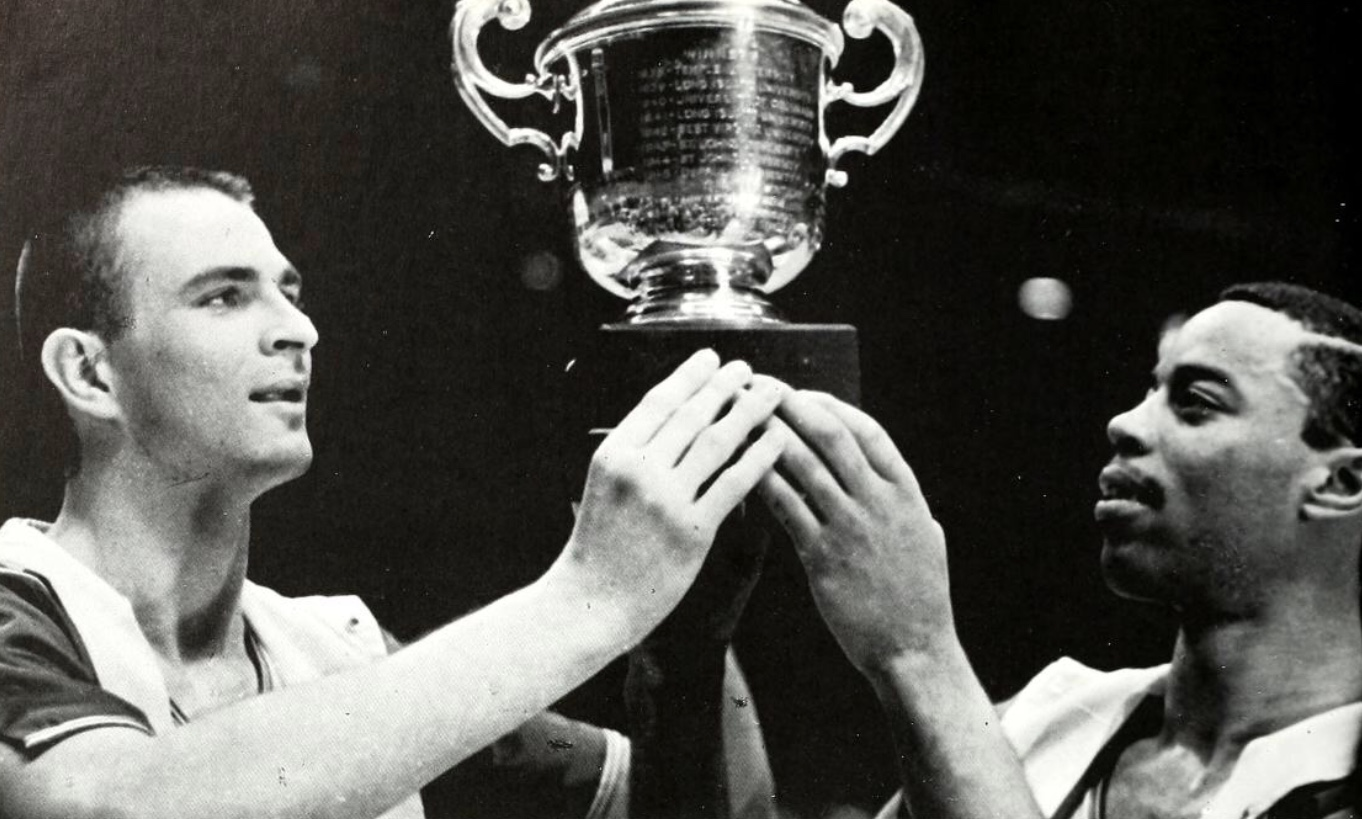
Captains Ralph Johnson and Walt Frazier of Southern Illinois hold the NIT trophy.

The 1967 National Invitation Tournament was a single-elimination postseason college basketball tournament. Fourteen National Collegiate Athletic Association teams, 13 from the University Division and one from the College Division, participated in the tournament. Southern Illinois, in their final season as a College Division team, defeated Marquette, 71–56, in the championship game, becoming the only non-Division I/University Division team to win the tournament. After the NCAA began operating the NIT in 2006, non-Division I teams were no longer eligible to participate. SIU's Walt Frazier was the tournament MOP.

== Selected teams ==
Below is a list of the 14 teams selected for the tournament.

- Duke
- Marquette
- Marshall
- Memphis
- Nebraska
- New Mexico
- Providence
- Rutgers
- Saint Peter's
- Southern Illinois
- Syracuse
- Tulsa
- Utah State
- Villanova

== Bracket ==
Below is the tournament bracket.

First Round
Southern Illinois | 103
Saint Peter's | 58
New Mexico | 66
Syracuse | 64
Rutgers | 78
Utah State | 76
Marshall | 70
Villanova | 68
Marquette | 64
Tulsa | 60
Providence | 77
Memphis | 68

Quarterfinals
Southern Illinois | 72
Duke | 63
New Mexico | 60
Rutgers | 65
Marshall | 119
Nebraska | 88
Marquette | 81
Providence | 80

Semifinals
Southern Illinois | 79
Rutgers | 70
Marshall | 78
Marquette | 83

Finals
Southern Illinois | 71
Marquette | 56

| Third place game |
| Rutgers | 93 |
| Marshall | 76 |

== See also ==
- 1967 NCAA University Division basketball tournament
- 1967 NCAA College Division basketball tournament
- 1967 NAIA Division I men's basketball tournament
