= Langston High School (Arkansas) =

Former African-American high school in Hot Springs, Arkansas (1913–1970)

Location
- Hot Springs, Arkansas, U.S.
- 34.5041°N 93.0421°W

Information
- School type: Public high school, segregated
- Established: 1913
- Closed: 1970
- School district: Hot Springs School District
- Colors: gold and blue
- Accreditation: North Central Association of Colleges and Secondary Schools

Langston High School was an American segregated high school for African American students, active from 1913 until 1970 and located in Hot Springs, Arkansas. It was one of the leading schools in Arkansas for African Americans, and was accredited by the North Central Association of Colleges and Secondary Schools.

It was established in 1913, the first high school for African Americans in Hot Springs. The Hot Springs School District struggled with racial integration for some 14 years, before this school was shut down in 1970 for failure to integrate. The building was eventually torn down.

== History ==
The Rugg Street School (or Rugg Free School, active c. 1894–1913) preceded Langston, and it experienced an arson attempt in 1894, before it was burned down in 1913. A new school building was constructed for the school starting in 1914 at a new location on Silver Street after the fire. Classes were held at the Visitor's Chapel A.M.E. Church basement, until the new building was completed.

Langston High School was named for John Mercer Langston. The school colors were gold and blue. The first graduating class for Langston High School was in 1913 was nine students. The first classes in the newly built building were held in the fall of 1916, and the enrollment was 400 students which had surpassed expectation. By the 1920s, students came from all over the state of Arkansas in order to attend Langston. By 1921, the graduation class was thirty-five students.

Langston High School was accredited in 1950. There was an incident in 1958, after a black male and a white female were seen together in public (and possibly in a romantic relationship which was considered "illicit" and illegal at the time); a 4 foot-tall burning cross was left on the outside of the school set by two white male students. A crowd of 75 to 100 African American students gathered to witness the burning cross incident, with local police attributing it to a "prank".

In 1964, the school was relocated to Chestnut Street. A new building for the school was constructed in 1964 as Hot Springs High School resisted desegregation. In 1967, a "intestinal flu bug" closed the school for days, with more than 300 students were sick out of the 485 enrolled students. Johnnie Belle Henderson, a math teacher, was the high school's last principal. In 1968, the United States Supreme Court used Langston High School as one of the examples for the failure of the school districts reintegration plan, "freedom-to-choose" and they were given the deadline of integration by the fall of 1969. Only two faculty members from Langston were brought over to the local Hot Springs High School after desegregation; the African American students were discriminated against and efforts made to exclude them. The process of racial integration in public school was supposed to start in 1955 (after Brown v. Board of Education), however Langston experienced many delays, eventually forcing the school to close.

Langston High School was closed in 1970, and was converted to Langston Elementary School. In 1973, the building on Chestnut Street was used as a temporary location for the Garland County Community College (now National Park College).

The Langston Aerospace and Environmental Magnet School is located at 120 Chestnut Street in Hot Springs, it serves pre-K to 6th grade and has a diverse student body. A new building was constructed for it in 2019.

== Legacy ==
The state archives of Arkansas have a 1928 yearbook from the high school. Musician Henry Glover of King Records had graduated from Langston in 1939; and in 2021, a Hot Springs Park was dedicated to him Its football team played against Dunbar High School from Little Rock, Arkansas and future-NFL hall of famer Bobby Mitchell was a star on the team. He recalled being inspired by professional African American athletes visiting Hot Springs.

== Alumni ==
- Ike Thomas
- Mamie Phipps Clark
- Edith Irby Jones
- John Little (American football)
- Bobby Mitchell
