= 1966–67 Atlantic Coast Conference men's basketball season =

In the 1966–67 season of Atlantic Coast Conference men's basketball, the North Carolina Tar Heels team finished in the top position. The same team won the ACC Championship, and won the regional final of the NCAA tournament, reaching the semi-final of the national event.

== Final standings ==
Rank	School	W	L	Win %
1	North Carolina	12	2	.857
2	Duke	9	3	.750
3	South Carolina	8	4	.667
4	Clemson	9	5	.643
5	Wake Forest	5	9	.357
6	Maryland	5	9	.357
7	Virginia	4	10	.286
8	NC State	2	12	.143

== ACC tournament ==
See 1967 ACC men's basketball tournament

== NCAA tournament ==
=== Regional semifinal ===
North Carolina 78, Princeton 70

=== Regional final ===
North Carolina 96, Boston College 80

=== National semifinal ===
Dayton 76, North Carolina 62

=== National third-place game ===
Houston 84, North Carolina 62

=== ACC's NCAA record ===
2-2

== NIT ==
=== Quarterfinals ===
Southern Illinois 72, Duke 63
