= 1960–61 NCAA University Division men's basketball season =

Men's collegiate basketball season

- Preseason AP No. 1: None
- NCAA Tournament: 1961
- Tournament dates: March 14 – 25, 1961
- National Championship: Municipal Auditorium; Kansas City, Missouri
- NCAA Champions: Cincinnati Bearcats
- Helms National Champions: Cincinnati Bearcats
- Other champions: Providence Friars (NIT)
- Player of the Year (Helms): Jerry Lucas, Ohio State Buckeyes

The 1960–61 NCAA University Division men's basketball season began in December 1960, progressed through the regular season and conference tournaments, and concluded with the 1961 NCAA University Division basketball tournament championship game on March 25, 1961, at Municipal Auditorium in Kansas City, Missouri. The Cincinnati Bearcats won their first NCAA national championship with a 70–65 victory in overtime over the Ohio State Buckeyes.

== Season headlines ==
- A gambling scandal rocked the NCAA University Division and resulted in the arrests of 37 students from 22 different colleges and universities.
- In the 1961 NCAA University Division basketball tournament national third-place game, Saint Joseph's defeated Utah 127–120 in four overtimes, tying the record for the longest game in NCAA tournament history, set in 1956 in a first-round game between Canisius and North Carolina State. The Saint Joseph's victory later was vacated because of the gambling scandal.
- On March 25, 1961, two teams from Ohio, Cincinnati and Ohio State, met in the 1961 NCAA University Division basketball championship game, the first time two teams from the same U.S. state had played one another for the NCAA championship. Cincinnati defeated Ohio State 70–65 in overtime.
- Ed Jucker of Cincinnati became the first head coach to win the NCAA championship his first year at a school.

== Season outlook ==
=== Pre-season polls ===
The Top 20 from the AP Poll and the UPI Coaches Poll during the pre-season.

Associated Press
Ranking	Team
1	Ohio State
2	Bradley
3	Detroit
4	Indiana
5	North Carolina
6	St. Bonaventure
7	St. John's
8	Duke
9	Louisville
10	NC State
11	Auburn
12	Maryland
13	UCLA
14	Utah State
15	Georgia Tech
16 (tie)	Kansas
16 (tie)	Wichita
18	Utah
19	Illinois
20 (tie)	Kansas State
20 (tie)	Kentucky

UPI Coaches
Ranking	Team
1	Ohio State
2	Bradley
3	Indiana
4	Kansas
5	North Carolina
6 (tie)	St. Bonaventure
6 (tie)	Utah State
8	Cincinnati
9	Detroit
10	St. John's
11	Kansas State
12	Georgia Tech
13	Providence
14	Providence
15	Utah
16	Duke
17	California
18	Washington
19	Western Kentucky State
20	Dayton

== Conference membership changes ==
School	Former conference	New conference
Houston Cougars	Missouri Valley Conference	NCAA University Division independent
Siena Saints	NCAA University Division independent	non-University Division
Washington University Bears	NCAA University Division independent	non-University Division

== Regular season ==
=== Conferences ===
==== Conference winners and tournaments ====
Conference	Regular season winner	Conference player of the year	Conference tournament	Tournament venue (City)	Tournament winner
Athletic Association of Western Universities	USC	None selected	No Tournament		
Atlantic Coast Conference	North Carolina	Len Chappell, Wake Forest	1961 ACC men's basketball tournament	Reynolds Coliseum (Raleigh, North Carolina)	Wake Forest
Big Eight Conference	Kansas State	None selected	No Tournament		
Big Ten Conference	Ohio State	None selected	No Tournament		
Border Conference	Arizona State & New Mexico State		No Tournament		
Ivy League	Princeton	None selected	No Tournament		
Metropolitan New York Conference	St. John's		No Tournament		
Mid-American Conference	Ohio	None selected	No Tournament		
Middle Atlantic Conference	Saint Joseph's		No Tournament		
Missouri Valley Conference	Cincinnati	None selected	No Tournament		
Ohio Valley Conference	Eastern Kentucky State, Morehead State, & Western Kentucky State	None selected	No Tournament		
Skyline Conference	Colorado State & Utah		No Tournament		
Southeastern Conference	Mississippi State	None selected	No Tournament		
Southern Conference	West Virginia	Jeff Cohen, William and Mary	1961 Southern Conference men's basketball tournament	Richmond Arena (Richmond, Virginia)	George Washington
Southwest Conference	Texas Tech	Carroll Broussard, Texas A&M	No Tournament		
West Coast Athletic Conference	Loyola (Calif.)	Tom Meschery, Saint Mary's	No Tournament		
Yankee Conference	Rhode Island	None selected	No Tournament		

==== Conference standings ====
1960–61 AAWU Conference men's basketball standings
	Conf.				Overall
Team	W		L	PCT	W		L	PCT
No. 7 USC	9	–	3	.750	21	–	8	.724
UCLA	7	–	5	.583	18	–	8	.692
Washington	6	–	6	.500	13	–	13	.500
California	5	–	7	.417	16	–	10	.615
Stanford	3	–	9	.250	7	–	17	.292
Rankings from AP Poll

1960–61 ACC men's basketball standings
	Conf.				Overall
Team	W		L	PCT	W		L	PCT
No. 5 North Carolina	12	–	2	.857	19	–	4	.826
Wake Forest †	11	–	3	.786	19	–	11	.633
No. 10 Duke	10	–	4	.714	22	–	6	.786
NC State	8	–	6	.571	16	–	9	.640
Maryland	6	–	8	.429	14	–	12	.538
Clemson	5	–	9	.357	10	–	16	.385
South Carolina	2	–	12	.143	9	–	17	.346
Virginia	2	–	12	.143	3	–	23	.115
† 1961 ACC tournament winner Rankings from AP Poll

1960–61 Big Eight Conference men's basketball standings
	Conf.				Overall
Team	W		L	PCT	W		L	PCT
No. 4 Kansas State	12	–	2	.857	22	–	5	.815
Kansas	10	–	4	.714	17	–	8	.680
Oklahoma State	8	–	6	.571	14	–	11	.560
Missouri	7	–	7	.500	11	–	13	.458
Iowa State	6	–	8	.429	14	–	11	.560
Nebraska	4	–	10	.286	10	–	14	.417
Oklahoma	2	–	12	.143	10	–	15	.400
Colorado	7	–	7	.500	15	–	10	.600
Rankings from AP Poll

1960–61 Big Ten Conference men's basketball standings
	Conf.				Overall
Team	W		L	PCT	W		L	PCT
No. 1 Ohio State	14	–	0	1.000	27	–	1	.964
No. 8 Iowa	10	–	4	.714	18	–	6	.750
Purdue	10	–	4	.714	16	–	7	.696
Indiana	8	–	6	.571	15	–	9	.625
Minnesota	8	–	6	.571	10	–	13	.435
Northwestern	6	–	8	.429	10	–	12	.455
Illinois	5	–	9	.357	9	–	15	.375
Wisconsin	4	–	10	.286	7	–	17	.292
Michigan State	3	–	11	.214	7	–	17	.292
Michigan	2	–	12	.143	6	–	18	.250
Rankings from https://www.sports-reference.com/cbb/conferences/big-ten/1961.html

1960–61 Border Conference men's basketball standings
	Conf.				Overall
Team	W		L	PCT	W		L	PCT
Arizona State–Tempe	9	–	1	.900	23	–	6	.793
New Mexico State	9	–	1	.900	19	–	5	.792
Arizona	5	–	5	.500	11	–	15	.423
Texas Western	4	–	6	.400	12	–	12	.500
Hardin–Simmons	2	–	8	.200	12	–	14	.462
West Texas State	1	–	9	.100	7	–	16	.304
Rankings from AP Poll

1960–61 Ivy League men's basketball standings
	Conf.				Overall
Team	W		L	PCT	W		L	PCT
Princeton	11	–	3	.786	18	–	8	.692
Pennsylvania	10	–	4	.714	16	–	9	.640
Yale	8	–	6	.571	12	–	12	.500
Brown	8	–	6	.571	11	–	14	.440
Cornell	7	–	7	.500	14	–	10	.583
Harvard	4	–	10	.286	11	–	13	.458
Columbia	4	–	10	.286	8	–	15	.348
Dartmouth	4	–	10	.286	5	–	19	.208
Rankings from AP Poll

1960–61 Metropolitan New York Conference men's basketball standings
	Conf.				Overall
Team	W		L	PCT	W		L	PCT
St. John's	4	–	0	1.000	20	–	5	.800
NYU	2	–	1	.667	12	–	11	.522
St. Francis (NY)	2	–	1	.667	10	–	10	.500
CCNY	1	–	1	.500	7	–	10	.412
Manhattan	1	–	2	.333	8	–	11	.421
Brooklyn	0	–	2	.000	4	–	14	.222
Fordham	0	–	3	.000	7	–	16	.304
Rankings from AP Poll

1960–61 Mid-American Conference men's basketball standings
	Conf.				Overall
Team	W		L	PCT	W		L	PCT
Ohio	10	–	2	.833	17	–	7	.708
Toledo	8	–	4	.667	15	–	8	.652
Miami (Ohio)	7	–	5	.583	12	–	12	.500
Marshall	5	–	7	.417	11	–	13	.458
Bowling Green State	4	–	8	.333	10	–	14	.417
Western Michigan	4	–	8	.333	10	–	14	.417
Kent State	4	–	8	.333	9	–	14	.391
Rankings from AP Poll

1960–61 MAC men's basketball standings
	Conf.				Overall
Team	W		L	PCT	W		L	PCT
University
Saint Joseph's*	8	–	0	1.000	25	–	5	.833**
Temple	9	–	1	.900	20	–	8	.714
La Salle	7	–	2	.778	15	–	7	.682
Gettysburg	8	–	4	.667	19	–	6	.760
Lafayette	6	–	6	.500	16	–	8	.667
Bucknell	5	–	6	.455	12	–	11	.522
Rutgers	3	–	6	.333	11	–	10	.524
Lehigh	4	–	10	.286	5	–	16	.238
Delaware	2	–	7	.222	8	–	11	.421
Muhlenberg	2	–	12	.143	5	–	20	.200
College–Northern
Albright †	12	–	1	.923	19	–	9	.679
No. 6 Hofstra	10	–	1	.909	21	–	4	.840
Susquehanna	9	–	4	.692	17	–	6	.739
Moravian	11	–	5	.688	13	–	7	.650
Elizabethtown	7	–	7	.500	11	–	11	.500
Lebanon Valley	8	–	8	.500	10	–	9	.526
Wagner	5	–	5	.500	9	–	15	.375
Lycoming	6	–	8	.429	9	–	13	.409
Scranton	4	–	8	.333	5	–	18	.217
Wilkes	4	–	11	.267	7	–	15	.318
Upsala	2	–	9	.182		–		–
Juniata	1	–	10	.091	1	–	17	.056
Stevens***	0	–	3	.000		–		–
College–Southern
Drexel	11	–	2	.846	12	–	5	.706
Western Maryland	8	–	2	.800	16	–	7	.696
Haverford	8	–	4	.667	12	–	5	.706
Dickinson	9	–	5	.643		–		–
Franklin & Marshall	6	–	7	.462	8	–	11	.421
Pennsylvania Military	5	–	10	.333		–		–
Ursinus	4	–	9	.308	6	–	11	.353
Swarthmore	3	–	10	.231	3	–	13	.188
Johns Hopkins	1	–	9	.100	4	–	16	.200
Washington (MD)***	4	–	4	.500		–		–
West Chester***	3	–	3	.500		–		–
† 1961 MAC College Division men's basketball tournament winner * – Regular-season University Division champion ** – Overall record later adjuted to 22–4 (.846) *** – Ineligible for championship

1960–61 Missouri Valley Conference men's basketball standings
	Conf.				Overall
Team	W		L	PCT	W		L	PCT
No. 2 Cincinnati	10	–	2	.833	27	–	3	.900
No. 6 Bradley	9	–	3	.750	21	–	5	.808
Drake	7	–	5	.583	19	–	7	.731
Saint Louis	7	–	5	.583	21	–	9	.700
Wichita Municipal	6	–	6	.500	18	–	8	.692
Tulsa	2	–	10	.167	8	–	17	.320
North Texas State	1	–	11	.083	2	–	22	.083
Rankings from AP Poll

1960–61 Mountain States Conference men's basketball standings
	Conf.				Overall
Team	W		L	PCT	W		L	PCT
Utah	12	–	2	.857	23	–	8	.742
Colorado State	12	–	2	.857	17	–	9	.654
BYU	9	–	5	.643	15	–	11	.577
Montana	7	–	7	.500	14	–	9	.609
Denver	6	–	8	.429	12	–	14	.462
Utah State	4	–	10	.286	12	–	14	.462
Wyoming	3	–	11	.214	7	–	18	.280
New Mexico	3	–	11	.214	6	–	17	.261
Rankings from AP Poll

1960–61 Ohio Valley Conference men's basketball standings
	Conf.				Overall
Team	W		L	PCT	W		L	PCT
Western Kentucky State	9	–	3	.750	18	–	8	.692
Eastern Kentucky State	9	–	3	.750	15	–	9	.625
Morehead State	9	–	3	.750	19	–	12	.613
Murray State	7	–	5	.583	13	–	10	.565
Middle Tennessee	4	–	8	.333	9	–	14	.391
Tennessee Tech	3	–	9	.250	6	–	13	.316
East Tennessee State	1	–	11	.083	9	–	15	.375
Rankings from AP Poll

1960–61 Southeastern Conference men's basketball standings
	Conf.				Overall
Team	W		L	PCT	W		L	PCT
Mississippi State	11	–	3	.786	19	–	6	.760
Vanderbilt	10	–	4	.714	19	–	5	.792
Kentucky	10	–	4	.714	19	–	9	.679
Florida	9	–	5	.643	15	–	11	.577
Auburn	8	–	6	.571	15	–	7	.682
Georgia Tech	6	–	8	.429	13	–	13	.500
Tulane	6	–	8	.429	11	–	13	.458
LSU	6	–	8	.429	11	–	14	.440
Ole Miss	5	–	9	.357	10	–	14	.417
Alabama	5	–	9	.357	7	–	18	.280
Tennessee	4	–	10	.286	10	–	15	.400
Georgia	4	–	10	.286	8	–	18	.308
Rankings from AP Poll

1960–61 Southern Conference men's basketball standings
	Conf.				Overall
Team	W		L	PCT	W		L	PCT
No. 9 West Virginia	11	–	1	.917	23	–	4	.852
Virginia Tech	12	–	3	.800	15	–	7	.682
The Citadel	10	–	3	.769	17	–	8	.680
William & Mary	9	–	6	.600	14	–	10	.583
Furman	6	–	7	.462	15	–	11	.577
Richmond	5	–	11	.313	9	–	14	.391
George Washington †	3	–	9	.250	9	–	17	.346
VMI	3	–	11	.214	5	–	17	.227
Davidson	2	–	10	.167	9	–	14	.391
† Southern Conference Tournament winner Rankings from AP Poll

1960–61 Southwest Conference men's basketball standings
	Conf.				Overall
Team	W		L	PCT	W		L	PCT
Texas Tech	11	–	3	.786	15	–	10	.600
Texas A&M	10	–	4	.714	16	–	8	.667
Arkansas	9	–	5	.643	16	–	7	.696
Texas	8	–	6	.571	14	–	10	.583
Rice	7	–	7	.500	11	–	12	.478
SMU	6	–	8	.429	12	–	12	.500
TCU	3	–	11	.214	5	–	19	.208
Baylor	2	–	12	.143	4	–	20	.167
Rankings from AP Poll

1960–61 West Coast Athletic Conference men's basketball standings
	Conf.				Overall
Team	W		L	PCT	W		L	PCT
Loyola (Calif.)	10	–	2	.833	20	–	7	.741
Saint Mary's	8	–	4	.667	19	–	7	.731
Santa Clara	8	–	4	.667	18	–	9	.667
San Francisco	8	–	4	.667	17	–	11	.607
San Jose State		–		–	11	–	14	.440
Pepperdine	3	–	9	.250	9	–	16	.360
Pacific	0	–	12	.000	5	–	21	.192
† Regular-season championship winner Rankings from AP Poll

1960–61 Yankee Conference men's basketball standings
	Conf.				Overall
Team	W		L	PCT	W		L	PCT
Rhode Island	9	–	1	.900	18	–	9	.667
Maine	7	–	3	.700	18	–	5	.783
Connecticut	6	–	4	.600	11	–	13	.458
Massachusetts	4	–	6	.400	16	–	10	.615
Vermont	3	–	7	.300	9	–	11	.450
New Hampshire	1	–	9	.100	6	–	18	.250

=== University Division independents ===
A total of 46 college teams played as University Division independents. Among them, Memphis State (20–3) had the best winning percentage (.870), while St. Bonaventure (24–4) and Providence (24–5) finished with the most wins.

1960–61 NCAA University Division men's basketball independents standings
	Conf.				Overall
Team	W		L	PCT	W		L	PCT
Memphis State		–		–	20	–	3	.870
No. 3 St. Bonaventure		–		–	24	–	4	.857
Providence		–		–	24	–	5	.828
Holy Cross		–		–	21	–	5	.808
Niagara		–		–	16	–	5	.762
Miami (Fla.)		–		–	20	–	7	.741
Louisville		–		–	21	–	8	.724
Army		–		–	17	–	7	.708
Seattle		–		–	18	–	8	.692
Dayton		–		–	20	–	9	.690
Duquesne		–		–	15	–	7	.682
DePaul		–		–	17	–	8	.680
Detroit		–		–	18	–	9	.667
Loyola (Ill.)		–		–	15	–	8	.652
Portland		–		–	16	–	9	.640
Xavier		–		–	17	–	10	.630
Seton Hall		–		–	15	–	9	.625
Boston College		–		–	14	–	9	.609
Houston		–		–	17	–	11	.607
Marquette		–		–	16	–	11	.593
Florida State		–		–	14	–	10	.583
Butler		–		–	15	–	11	.577
Canisius		–		–	13	–	10	.565
Oregon		–		–	15	–	12	.556
Centenary (La.)		–		–	14	–	12	.538
Colgate		–		–	14	–	12	.538
Oklahoma City		–		–	14	–	12	.538
Oregon State		–		–	14	–	12	.538
Navy		–		–	10	–	9	.526
Georgetown		–		–	11	–	10	.524
Pittsburgh		–		–	12	–	11	.522
Idaho State		–		–	13	–	12	.520
Air Force		–		–	12	–	12	.500
Iona		–		–	10	–	11	.476
Notre Dame		–		–	12	–	14	.462
Penn State		–		–	11	–	13	.458
Villanova		–		–	11	–	13	.458
Gonzaga		–		–	11	–	15	.423
Montana State		–		–	10	–	15	.400
Boston University		–		–	9	–	14	.391
Idaho		–		–	10	–	16	.385
Washington State		–		–	10	–	16	.385
Creighton		–		–	8	–	17	.320
Loyola (La.)		–		–	6	–	18	.250
Saint Francis (Pa.)		–		–	6	–	19	.240
Syracuse		–		–	4	–	19	.174
Rankings from AP Poll

=== Informal championships ===
Conference	Regular season winner	Most Valuable Player
Philadelphia Big 5	Saint Joseph's	Bruce Drysdale, Temple

Saint Joseph's finished with a 4–0 record in head-to-head competition among the Philadelphia Big 5.

== Post-season tournaments ==
=== NCAA tournament ===
==== Final Four ====
National semifinals
E	St. Joseph's	69
ME	Ohio State	95
MW	Cincinnati	82
W	Utah	67

National finals
ME	Ohio State	65
MW	Cincinnati	70^{OT}
Third place
E	St. Joseph's	127 ^{4OT}
W	Utah	120

=== National Invitation tournament ===
==== Semifinals & finals ====
Semifinals
Saint Louis	67
Dayton	60
Holy Cross	83
Providence	90

Finals
Saint Louis	59
Providence	62
Third place
Dayton	67
Holy Cross	85

== Awards ==
=== Consensus All-American teams ===
Consensus First Team
Player	Position	Class	Team
Terry Dischinger	F	Junior	Purdue
Roger Kaiser	G	Senior	Georgia Tech
Jerry Lucas	F/C	Junior	Ohio State
Tom Stith	G/F	Senior	St. Bonaventure
Chet Walker	F	Junior	Bradley

Consensus Second Team
Player	Position	Class	Team
Walt Bellamy	C	Senior	Indiana
Frank Burgess	G	Senior	Gonzaga
Tony Jackson	G	Senior	St. John's
Billy McGill	C	Junior	Utah
Larry Siegfried	G	Senior	Ohio State

=== Major player of the year awards ===
- Helms Player of the Year: Jerry Lucas, Ohio State
- Associated Press Player of the Year:Jerry Lucas, Ohio State
- UPI Player of the Year: Jerry Lucas, Ohio State
- Oscar Robertson Trophy (USBWA): Jerry Lucas, Ohio State
- Sporting News Player of the Year: Jerry Lucas, Ohio State

=== Major coach of the year awards ===
- Henry Iba Award: Fred Taylor, Ohio State
- NABC Coach of the Year: Fred Taylor, Ohio State
- UPI Coach of the Year: Fred Taylor, Ohio State

=== Other major awards ===
- Robert V. Geasey Trophy (Top player in Philadelphia Big 5): Bruce Drysdale, Temple
- NIT/Haggerty Award (Top player in New York City metro area): Tony Jackson, St. John's

== Coaching changes ==
A number of teams changed coaches during the season and after it ended.

Team	Former Coach	Interim Coach	New Coach	Reason
Arizona	Fred Enke		Bruce Larson	
Baylor	Bill Henderson		Bill Menefee	
Columbia	Archie Oldman	Kenneth Hunter	Jack Rohan	
Holy Cross	Roy Leenig		Frank Oftring	
Kent State	Bill Bertka		Robert F. Doll	
Loyola (Calif.)	Bill Donovan		John Arndt	
North Carolina	Frank McGuire		Dean Smith	McGuire resigned to become head coach of the Philadelphia Warriors. Thirty-year-old assistant Smith was elevated to the head coaching spot.
Princeton	Franklin Cappon		Jake McCandless	
St. Bonaventure	Eddie Donovan		Larry Weise	
Texas Tech	Polk Robinson		Gene Gibson	
Texas Western	Harold Davis		Don Haskins	
Utah State	H. Cecil Baker		LaDell Anderson	
Vanderbilt	Bob Polk		Roy Skinner	
Villanova	Alexander Severance		Jack Kraft	
