= 1960–61 Houston Cougars men's basketball team =

American college basketball season

1960–61 Houston Cougars men's basketball
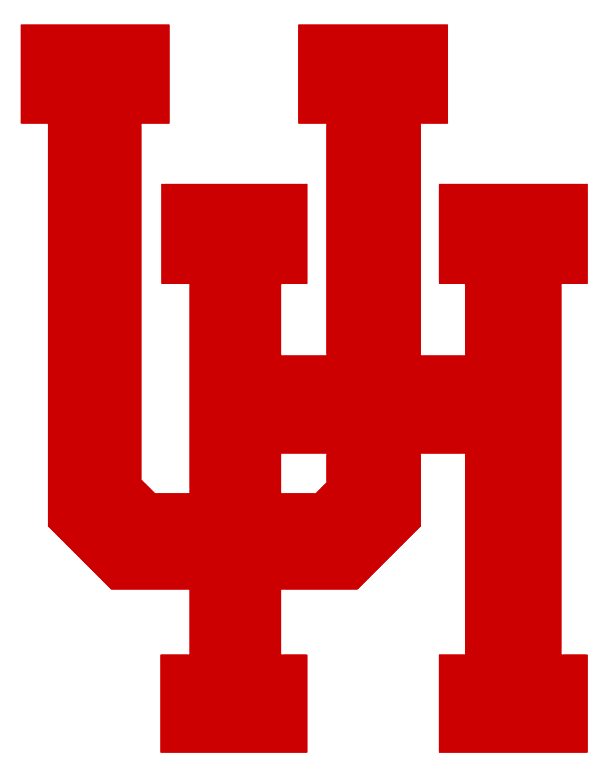

NCAA tournament, Regional Semifinals
- Conference: Independent
- Record: 17–11
- Head coach: Guy Lewis (5th season)
- Assistant coach: Harvey Pate
- Home arena: Jeppesen Fieldhouse; Sam Houston Coliseum

1960–61 NCAA University Division men's basketball independents standings
	Conf.				Overall
Team	W		L	PCT	W		L	PCT
Memphis State		–		–	20	–	3	.870
No. 3 St. Bonaventure		–		–	24	–	4	.857
Providence		–		–	24	–	5	.828
Holy Cross		–		–	21	–	5	.808
Niagara		–		–	16	–	5	.762
Miami (Fla.)		–		–	20	–	7	.741
Louisville		–		–	21	–	8	.724
Army		–		–	17	–	7	.708
Seattle		–		–	18	–	8	.692
Dayton		–		–	20	–	9	.690
Duquesne		–		–	15	–	7	.682
DePaul		–		–	17	–	8	.680
Detroit		–		–	18	–	9	.667
Loyola (Ill.)		–		–	15	–	8	.652
Portland		–		–	16	–	9	.640
Xavier		–		–	17	–	10	.630
Seton Hall		–		–	15	–	9	.625
Boston College		–		–	14	–	9	.609
Houston		–		–	17	–	11	.607
Marquette		–		–	16	–	11	.593
Florida State		–		–	14	–	10	.583
Butler		–		–	15	–	11	.577
Canisius		–		–	13	–	10	.565
Oregon		–		–	15	–	12	.556
Centenary (La.)		–		–	14	–	12	.538
Colgate		–		–	14	–	12	.538
Oklahoma City		–		–	14	–	12	.538
Oregon State		–		–	14	–	12	.538
Navy		–		–	10	–	9	.526
Georgetown		–		–	11	–	10	.524
Pittsburgh		–		–	12	–	11	.522
Idaho State		–		–	13	–	12	.520
Air Force		–		–	12	–	12	.500
Iona		–		–	10	–	11	.476
Notre Dame		–		–	12	–	14	.462
Penn State		–		–	11	–	13	.458
Villanova		–		–	11	–	13	.458
Gonzaga		–		–	11	–	15	.423
Montana State		–		–	10	–	15	.400
Boston University		–		–	9	–	14	.391
Idaho		–		–	10	–	16	.385
Washington State		–		–	10	–	16	.385
Creighton		–		–	8	–	17	.320
Loyola (La.)		–		–	6	–	18	.250
Saint Francis (Pa.)		–		–	6	–	19	.240
Syracuse		–		–	4	–	19	.174
Rankings from AP Poll

The 1960–61 Houston Cougars men's basketball team represented the University of Houston in NCAA University Division competition in the 1960–61 season.

Houston, coached by Guy Lewis, played its home games in Jeppesen Fieldhouse and the Sam Houston Coliseum in Houston, Texas, and was then an Independent.

This was the first postseason and NCAA Tournament appearance for Lewis as head coach.

== Roster ==
1960–61 Houston Cougars men's basketball team
Players
Coaches

Pos.	#	Name	Height	Weight	Year	Previous school	Hometown
G	30	Don Schverak	6 ft 4 in (1.93 m)	—	Fr	Reagan HS	Houston, Texas
G	32	Jim Lemmon	6 ft 2 in (1.88 m)	—	Sr		Wood River, Illinois
F	34	Ted Luckenbill	6 ft 6 in (1.98 m)	205 lb (93 kg)	Sr	Elkhart HS	Elkhart, Indiana
F	42	Lyle Harger	6 ft 7 in (2.01 m)	220 lb (100 kg)	So		Lubbock, Texas
G	54	Gary Phillips	6 ft 3 in (1.91 m)	189 lb (86 kg)	Sr	Quincy HS	Quincy, Illinois

Head coach

- Guy Lewis (Houston)

Assistant coach(es)

- Harvey Pate (Oklahoma State)

Legend

- (C) Team captain
- (S) Suspended
- (I) Ineligible
- (W) Walk-on
- Injured
- Current redshirt

Roster

== Schedule and results ==
Date time, TV	Opponent	Result	Record	Site city, state
Regular season
Dec 1, 1960	at North Texas State	W 73–53	1–0	Men's Gymnasium; Denton, Texas
Dec 6, 1960	at Texas A&M	L 61–66	1–1	G. Rollie White Coliseum; College Station, Texas
Dec 8, 1960	at Sam Houston State	L 52–55	1–2	Bearkat Gymnasium; Huntsville, Texas
Dec 10, 1960	at Lamar Tech	W 68–64	2–2	McDonald Gym; Beaumont, Texas
Dec 15, 1960	Oklahoma; Lion’s Club Tournament	L 51–55	2–3	Sam Houston Coliseum; Houston, Texas
Dec 16, 1960	Oklahoma State; Lion’s Club Tournament	W 56–54	3–3	Sam Houston Coliseum; Houston, Texas
Dec 17, 1960	at Oklahoma City	W 78–65	4–3	Frederickson Fieldhouse; Oklahoma City, Oklahoma
Dec 28, 1960	vs. No. 18 Wichita; All-College Tournament	L 68–71	4–4	Frederickson Fieldhouse; Oklahoma City, Oklahoma
Dec 29, 1960	vs. TCU; All-College Tournament	W 85–72	5–4	Frederickson Fieldhouse; Oklahoma City, Oklahoma
Dec 30, 1960	at Oklahoma City; All-College Tournament	W 86–82	6–4	Frederickson Fieldhouse; Oklahoma City, Oklahoma
Jan 3, 1961	Lamar Tech	W 100–73	7–4	Jeppesen Fieldhouse; Houston, Texas
Jan 5, 1961	at Cincinnati	L 71–74 ^{OT}	7–5	Armory Fieldhouse; Cincinnati, Ohio
Jan 12, 1961	No. 2 Bradley	W 60–59	8–5	Sam Houston Coliseum; Houston, Texas
Jan 14, 1961	Saint Louis	W 75–69	9–5	Sam Houston Coliseum; Houston, Texas
Jan 19, 1961	Texas A&M	W 89–85	10–5	Sam Houston Coliseum; Houston, Texas
Jan 21, 1961	at Miami (FL)	L 78–89	10–6	Miami Beach Exhibition Hall; Miami Beach, Florida
Jan 28, 1961	Loyola (LA)	W 92–56	11–6	Jeppesen Fieldhouse; Houston, Texas
Jan 31, 1961	Pacific	W 101–66	12–6	Jeppesen Fieldhouse; Houston, Texas
Feb 2, 1961	at Tulsa	W 88–73	13–6	Tulsa Fairgrounds Pavilion; Tulsa, Oklahoma
Feb 9, 1961	North Texas State	W 86–57	14–6	Jeppesen Fieldhouse; Houston, Texas
Feb 11, 1961	Oklahoma City	W 107–78	15–6	Jeppesen Fieldhouse; Houston, Texas
Feb 16, 1961	at No. 5 Bradley	L 74–90	15–7	Robertson Memorial Field House; Peoria, Illinois
Feb 18, 1961	at Saint Louis	L 62–73	15–8	Kiel Auditorium; St. Louis, Missouri
Feb 23, 1961	No. 3 Cincinnati	L 80–85	15–9	Jeppesen Fieldhouse; Houston, Texas
Mar 4, 1961	Tulsa	W 89–65	16–9	Jeppesen Fieldhouse; Houston, Texas
NCAA tournament
Mar 15, 1961	Marquette; Regional quarterfinals – First round	W 77–61	17–9	Delmar Fieldhouse; Houston, Texas
Mar 17, 1961	vs. No. 4 Kansas State; Regional semifinals – Sweet Sixteen	L 64–75	17–10	Allen Fieldhouse; Lawrence, Kansas
Mar 18, 1961	vs. Texas Tech; Regional third-place game	L 67–69	17–11	Allen Fieldhouse; Lawrence, Kansas
*Non-conference game. ^{#}Rankings from AP Poll. (#) Tournament seedings in parentheses. All times are in Central Time.
