= 1961 NCAA University Division basketball championship game =

1961 NCAA Tournament Championship Game
National championship game
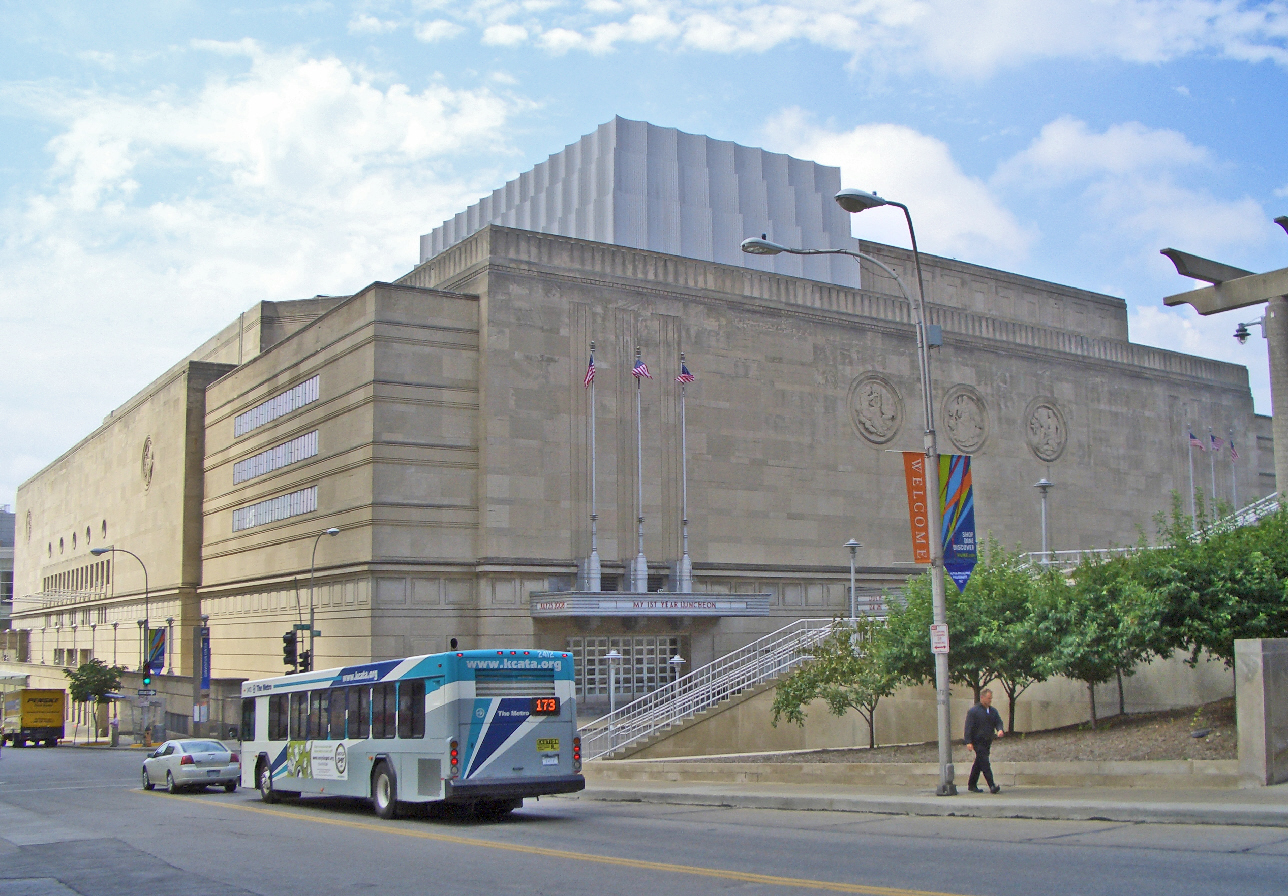
- The Municipal Auditorium in Kansas City, Missouri, hosted the championship game.
Ohio State Buckeyes	Cincinnati Bearcats
Big Ten	MVC
(27-0)	(27-3)
65	70
Head coach: Fred Taylor	Head coach: Ed Jucker
- AP: 1
- Coaches: 1
- AP: 2
- Coaches: 2
	1st half	2nd half	OT	Total
Ohio State Buckeyes	39	22	4	65
Cincinnati Bearcats	38	23	9	70
- Date: March 25, 1961
- Venue: Municipal Auditorium, Kansas City, Missouri
- MVP: Jerry Lucas, Ohio State

The 1961 NCAA University Division Basketball Championship Game was the finals of the 1961 NCAA University Division basketball tournament and it determined the national champion for the 1960-61 NCAA University Division men's basketball season. The game was played on March 25, 1961, at Municipal Auditorium in Kansas City, Missouri. It featured the top-ranked and defending national champion Ohio State Buckeyes of the Big Ten Conference, and the second-ranked Cincinnati Bearcats of the Missouri Valley Conference in an all-Ohio matchup. This was the first national championship game to feature two teams from the same state.

The Bearcats upset the defending national champion Buckeyes to win their first national championship in program history. This marked the first of what is currently three consecutive losses in the national championship for Ohio State, as the Buckeyes would lose in the championship game again the next year in 1962, and in 2007.

== Participating teams ==
=== Ohio State Buckeyes ===
- Mideast
  - Ohio State 56, Louisville 55
  - Ohio State 87, Kentucky 74
- Final Four
  - Ohio State 95, Saint Joseph's 69

=== Cincinnati Bearcats ===
- Midwest
  - Cincinnati 66, Creighton 46
  - Cincinnati 73, Colorado 46
- Final Four
  - Cincinnati 72, UCLA 70

== Game summary ==
March 25, 1961

#2 Cincinnati Bearcats 70, #1 Ohio State Buckeyes 65 (OT)
Scoring by half: 38-39, 23-22 Overtime: 9-4
Pts: Bob Wiesenhahn 17; Rebs: Bob Wiesenhahn 9	Pts: Jerry Lucas 27; Rebs: Jerry Lucas 12

Municipal Auditorium, Kansas City, Missouri
