= 1960–61 Utah Redskins men's basketball team =

American college basketball season

1960–61 Utah Redskins men's basketball

MSAC Champions

NCAA tournament, Final Four
- Conference: Mountain States Athletic Conference

Ranking
- Coaches: No. 13
- Record: 23–8 (12–2 MSAC)
- Head coach: Jack Gardner (8th season)
- Home arena: Nielsen Fieldhouse

1960–61 MSAC men's basketball standings
	Conf.				Overall
Team	W		L	PCT	W		L	PCT
No. 14 Utah	12	–	2	.857	23	–	8	.742
Colorado State	12	–	2	.857	17	–	9	.654
BYU	9	–	5	.643	15	–	11	.577
Montana	7	–	7	.500	14	–	9	.609
Denver	6	–	8	.429	12	–	14	.462
Utah State	4	–	10	.286	12	–	14	.462
Wyoming	3	–	11	.214	7	–	18	.280
New Mexico	3	–	11	.214	6	–	17	.261
Rankings from AP Poll

The 1960–61 Utah Redskins men's basketball team represented the University of Utah in the 1965-66 season. Head coach Jack Gardner would lead the Utes to a Mountain States Athletic Conference championship and the Final Four of the NCAA tournament. Their final game of the season, which was a quadruple-overtime third place game against Saint Joseph's University, was later rescinded by Saint Joseph's team and stricken from the record books days after the game was finished due to it being discovered that three of the Hawks' players were discovered to have been involved with the 1961 NCAA University Division men's basketball gambling scandal. Following that scandal coming to light, it was said that some of Utah's players would testify in court against the main perpetrator of the scandal, former NBA All-Star Jack Molinas. The team finished with an overall record of 23–8 (12–2 MSAC).

== Roster ==
1960–61 Utah Redskins men's basketball team
Players
Coaches

Pos.	#	Name	Height	Weight	Year	Hometown
F	12	Billy McGill	6 ft 9 in (2.06 m)	225 lb (102 kg)	Jr	Los Angeles, California
F	11	Jim Rhead	6 ft 4 in (1.93 m)	208 lb (94 kg)	Sr	Salt Lake City, Utah

Head coach

- Jack Gardner (USC)

Assistant coach(es)

Legend

- (C) Team captain
- (S) Suspended
- (I) Ineligible
- (W) Walk-on
- Injured
- Current redshirt

== Schedule and results ==
Date time, TV	Rank^{#}	Opponent^{#}	Result	Record	Site city, state
Regular Season
Dec 1, 1960*		at Loyola Marymount	L 64–85	0–1	Loyola Memorial Gym; Los Angeles, California
Dec 3, 1960*		at Stanford	L 56–59	0–2	Old Pavilion; Stanford, California
Dec 7, 1960*		Evansville	W 132–77	1–2	Nielsen Fieldhouse; Salt Lake City, Utah
Dec 9, 1960*		Baylor	W 83–69	2–2	Nielsen Fieldhouse; Salt Lake City, Utah
Dec 10, 1960*		Texas Christian	W 101–55	3–2	Nielsen Fieldhouse; Salt Lake City, Utah
Dec 16, 1960*	No. 18	San Jose State	W 82–48	4–2	Nielsen Fieldhouse; Salt Lake City, Utah
Dec 20, 1960*	No. 18	Saint Mary's	W 70–64	5–2	Nielsen Fieldhouse; Salt Lake City, Utah
Dec 22, 1960*	No. 18	Cal State Los Angeles	W 105–76	6–2	Nielsen Fieldhouse; Salt Lake City, Utah
Dec 27, 1960*		vs. Penn; ECAC Holiday Festival	W 72–60	7–2	Madison Square Garden; New York, New York
Dec 29, 1960*		vs. No. 3 St. Bonaventure; ECAC Holiday Festival	L 88–89	7–3	Madison Square Garden; New York, New York
Dec 31, 1960*		at No. 7 St. John's; ECAC Holiday Festival	L 65–73	7–4	Madison Square Garden; New York, New York
Jan 7, 1961		at Utah State	W 85–70	8–4 (1–0)	Nelson Fieldhouse; Logan, Utah
Jan 12, 1961		New Mexico	W 111–66	9–4 (2–0)	Nielsen Fieldhouse; Salt Lake City, Utah
Jan 14, 1961		Denver	W 95–82	10–4 (3–0)	Nielsen Fieldhouse; Salt Lake City, Utah
Jan 20, 1961		at Brigham Young	L 86–91	10–5 (3–1)	Smith Field House; Provo, Utah
Jan 21, 1961		Montana	W 72–56	11–5 (4–1)	Nielsen Fieldhouse; Salt Lake City, Utah
Jan 28, 1961*		Santa Clara	W 55–51	12–5	Nielsen Fieldhouse; Salt Lake City, Utah
Feb 2, 1961		Colorado State	W 69–58	13–5 (5–1)	Nielsen Fieldhouse; Salt Lake City, Utah
Feb 4, 1961		Wyoming	W 83–71	14–5 (6–1)	Nielsen Fieldhouse; Salt Lake City, Utah
Feb 11, 1961		at Montana	W 76–55	15–5 (7–1)	Dahlberg Arena; Missoula, Montana
Feb 16, 1961		at Denver	W 67–62	16–5 (8–1)	DU Fieldhouse; Denver, Colorado
Feb 18, 1961		at New Mexico	W 77–63	17–5 (9–1)	Johnson Gymnasium; Albuquerque, New Mexico
Feb 23, 1961		Brigham Young	W 95–80	18–5 (10–1)	Nielsen Fieldhouse; Salt Lake City, Utah
Feb 25, 1961		Utah State	W 96–84	19–5 (11–1)	Nielsen Fieldhouse; Salt Lake City, Utah
Mar 3, 1961		at Wyoming	W 83–69	20–5 (12–1)	War Memorial Fieldhouse; Laramie, Wyoming
Mar 4, 1961		at Colorado State	L 49–50	20–6 (12–2)	South College Gym; Fort Collins, Colorado
Mar 6, 1961*		vs. Colorado State; Skyline Conference Playoff	W 55–51	21–6	Smith Field House; Provo, Utah
NCAA Tournament
Mar 17, 1961*		vs. Loyola Marymount; West Regional Final – Sweet Sixteen	W 91–75	22–6	Memorial Coliseum; Portland, Oregon
Mar 18, 1961*		vs. Arizona State; West Regional Final – Elite Eight	W 88–80	23–6	Memorial Coliseum; Portland, Oregon
Mar 24, 1961*		vs. No. 2 Cincinnati; National Semifinal – Final Four	L 67–82	23–7	Municipal Auditorium; Kansas City, Missouri
Mar 25, 1961*		vs. Saint Joseph's; Consolation	L 120–127 ^{4OT}	23–8	Municipal Auditorium; Kansas City, Missouri
*Non-conference game. ^{#}Rankings from AP Poll. (#) Tournament seedings in parentheses.

== Awards and honors ==
- Billy McGill – Consensus Second-Team All-American
