= 1960–61 Cincinnati Bearcats men's basketball team =

American college basketball season

1960–61 Cincinnati Bearcats men's basketball
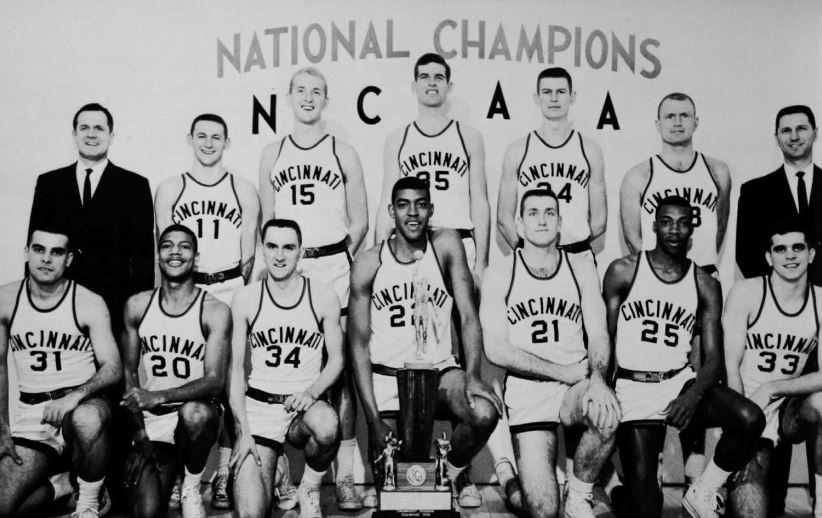

NCAA tournament National Champions MVC champions

National Championship Game, W 70–65 ^{OT} vs. Ohio State
- Conference: Missouri Valley Conference

Ranking
- Coaches: No. 2
- AP: No. 2
- Record: 27–3 (10–2 MVC)
- Head coach: Ed Jucker (1st season)
- Assistant coach: Tay Baker
- Home arena: Armory Fieldhouse

1960–61 Missouri Valley Conference men's basketball standings
	Conf.				Overall
Team	W		L	PCT	W		L	PCT
No. 2 Cincinnati	10	–	2	.833	27	–	3	.900
No. 6 Bradley	9	–	3	.750	21	–	5	.808
Drake	7	–	5	.583	19	–	7	.731
Saint Louis	7	–	5	.583	21	–	9	.700
Wichita Municipal	6	–	6	.500	18	–	8	.692
Tulsa	2	–	10	.167	8	–	17	.320
North Texas State	1	–	11	.083	2	–	22	.083
Rankings from AP Poll

The 1960–61 Cincinnati Bearcats men's basketball team represented University of Cincinnati. Cincinnati won the Missouri Valley Conference regular season title and the NCAA tournament, defeating in-state foe and defending national champion Ohio State 70–65 in the Championship Game in Kansas City, Missouri. The team's head coach was Ed Jucker, his first year at the helm.

== Roster ==
1960–61 Cincinnati Bearcats men's basketball team
Players
Coaches

Pos.	#	Name	Height	Weight	Year	Previous school	Hometown
F	--	Frank Turner	—	—
F	--	Mark Altenau	6 ft 3 in (1.91 m)	—	Jr	St. Xavier	Cincinnati, Ohio
G	--	Sandy Pomerantz	—	—	So	University City	St. Louis, Missouri
G	11	Larry Shingleton	5 ft 10 in (1.78 m)	—	So	Madison	Madison, Indiana
F	15	Fred Dierking	6 ft 6 in (1.98 m)	—	Jr	Valley Stream Central	Valley Stream, New York
G	20	Tony Yates	6 ft 1 in (1.85 m)	—	So	Lockland Wayne	Lawrenceburg, Indiana
F	21	Bob Wiesenhahn (C)	6 ft 4 in (1.93 m)	215 lb (98 kg)	Sr	Archbishop McNicholas	Cincinnati, Ohio
C	22	Paul Hogue	6 ft 9 in (2.06 m)	240 lb (109 kg)	Jr	Austin	Knoxville, Tennessee
F	24	Dale Heidotting	6 ft 8 in (2.03 m)	—	So	Greenhills	Greenhills, Ohio
G	25	Tom Thacker	6 ft 2 in (1.88 m)	170 lb (77 kg)	So	William Grant	Covington, Kentucky
G	31	Jim Calhoun	6 ft 0 in (1.83 m)	—	Jr	Carr Creek	Carr Creek, Kentucky
G	33	Tom Sizer	6 ft 2 in (1.88 m)	—	Jr	Middletown	Middletown, Ohio
G	34	Carl Bouldin (C)	6 ft 2 in (1.88 m)	180 lb (82 kg)	Sr	Norwood	Norwood, Ohio
C	35	Ron Reis	6 ft 10 in (2.08 m)	—	Jr	Woodward	Cincinnati, Ohio

Head coach

- Ed Jucker (Cincinnati)

Assistant coach(es)

- Tay Baker (Cincinnati)

Legend

- (C) Team captain
- (S) Suspended
- (I) Ineligible
- (W) Walk-on
- Injured
- Current redshirt

Roster
Last update: April 17, 2020

== Schedule ==
Date time, TV	Rank^{#}	Opponent^{#}	Result	Record	Site city, state
Regular Season
December 3, 1960*		Western Michigan	W 85–54	1–0	Armory Fieldhouse; Cincinnati, OH
December 6, 1960*		at Miami (OH)	W 70–62	2–0	Cincinnati Gardens; Cincinnati, OH
December 9, 1960*		vs. Seton Hall	L 76–84	2–1	Madison Square Garden; New York, NY
December 13, 1960*		Loyola Marymount	W 74–53	3–1	Armory Fieldhouse; Cincinnati, OH
December 16, 1960		at Saint Louis	L 40–57	3–2 (0–1)	Kiel Auditorium; Saint Louis, MO
December 19, 1960*		Nebraska	W 75–60	4–2	Armory Fieldhouse; Cincinnati, OH
December 23, 1960		at No. 2 Bradley	L 53–72	4–3 (0–2)	Robertson Memorial Field House; Peoria, IL
December 29, 1960*		Dayton	W 71–61	5–3	Cincinnati Gardens; Cincinnati, OH
December 31, 1960*		George Washington	W 84–61	6–3	Armory Fieldhouse; Cincinnati, OH
January 5, 1961*		Houston	W 74–71	7–3	Armory Fieldhouse; Cincinnati, OH
January 7, 1961		North Texas	W 83–34	8–3 (1–2)	Armory Fieldhouse; Cincinnati, OH
January 12, 1961		at Wichita State	W 80–57	9–3 (2–2)	Levitt Arena; Wichita, KS
January 14, 1961		at Tulsa	W 92–75	10–3 (3–2)	Expo Square Pavilion; Tulsa, OK
January 17, 1961*		Duquesne	W 64–53	11–3	Armory Fieldhouse; Cincinnati, OH
January 20, 1961		at Drake	W 86–64	12–3 (4–2)	Veterans Memorial Auditorium; Des Moines, IA
January 28, 1961		Drake	W 80–70	13–3 (5–2)	Armory Fieldhouse; Cincinnati, OH
January 31, 1961		No. 3 Bradley	W 73–72	14–3 (6–2)	Armory Fieldhouse; Cincinnati, OH
February 4, 1961*		vs. No. 6 Iowa	W 77–60	15–3	Chicago Stadium; Chicago, IL
February 9, 1961	No. 5	Saint Louis	W 61–52	16–3 (7–2)	Armory Fieldhouse; Cincinnati, OH
February 16, 1961	No. 4	Wichita State	W 67–64	17–3 (8–2)	Armory Fieldhouse; Cincinnati, OH
February 18, 1961	No. 4	Tulsa	W 81–52	18–3 (9–2)	Armory Fieldhouse; Cincinnati, OH
February 23, 1961*	No. 3	at Houston	W 85–80	19–3	Jeppesen Field House; Houston, TX
February 25, 1961	No. 3	at North Texas	W 73–43	20–3 (10–2)	North Texas Men's Gym; Denton, TX
March 2, 1961*	No. 3	Xavier; Crosstown Shootout	W 89–53	21–3	Cincinnati Gardens; Cincinnati, OH
March 4, 1961*	No. 3	at Marshall	W 69–57	22–3	Memorial Field House; Huntington, WV
NCAA Tournament
March 17*	No. 2	vs. Texas Tech; Midwest Region Semifinals	W 78–55	23–3	Allen Fieldhouse; Lawrence, KS
March 18*	No. 2	vs. No. 4 Kansas State; Midwest Region Finals	W 69–64	24–3	Allen Fieldhouse; Lawrence, KS
March 24*	No. 2	vs. Utah; Final Four	W 82–67	25–3	Municipal Auditorium; Kansas City, MO
March 25*	No. 2	vs. No. 1 Ohio State; National Championship	W 70–65 ^{OT}	26–3	Municipal Auditorium; Kansas City, MO
*Non-conference game. ^{#}Rankings from AP Poll. (#) Tournament seedings in parentheses.

== Awards and honors ==
=== All-American ===
- Honorable Mention: Paul Hogue
- Honorable Mention: Bob Wiesenhahn

=== Missouri Valley Conference honors ===
==== All-MVC Awards ====
- Coach of the Year: Ed Jucker

==== All-MVC ====
- Paul Hogue
- Tom Thacker
- Bob Wiesenhahn

== Team players drafted into the NBA draft ==
Round	Pick	Player	NBA club
2	11	Bob Wiesenhahn	Cincinnati Royals
