= Jack Gardner (basketball) =

American basketball coach (1910–2000)

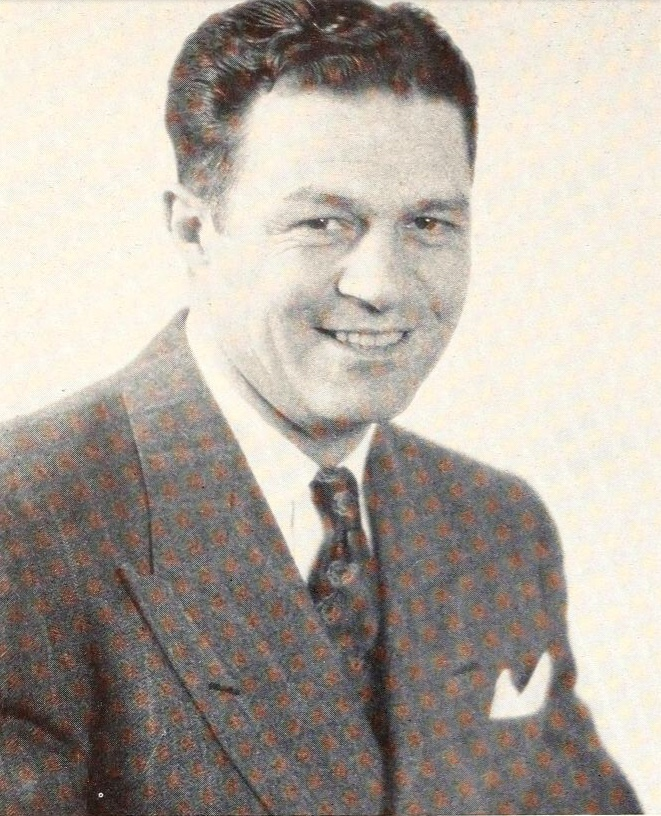
- Gardner from the 1949 Royal Purple

Biographical details
- Born: March 29, 1910; Texico, New Mexico, U.S.
- Died: April 9, 2000 (aged 90); Salt Lake City, Utah, U.S.

Playing career
- 1928–1932: USC

Coaching career (HC unless noted)
- 1939–1942: Kansas State
- 1946–1953: Kansas State
- 1953–1971: Utah

Head coaching record
- Overall: 486–235 (.674)

Accomplishments and honors

Championships
- 4 NCAA Regional—Final Four (1948, 1951, 1961, 1966); 3 Big Six/Seven (1948, 1950, 1951); 4 Skyline (1955, 1956, 1959, 1962); WAC (1966)
- Basketball Hall of Fame; Inducted in 1984
- College Basketball Hall of Fame; Inducted in 2006

James H. Gardner (March 29, 1910 – April 9, 2000) was an American college basketball coach, known for his tenures as the head coach at Kansas State University and the University of Utah. He is a member of the Naismith Memorial Basketball Hall of Fame.

Born in Texico, New Mexico, Gardner was raised in southern California, and was a four-sport athlete in high school at Redlands. A graduate of the University of Southern California in Los Angeles, he was the captain of the Trojan basketball team and led the Pacific Coast Conference (PCC) in scoring. Gardner coached at Kansas State from 1939 to 1942 and 1946 to 1953, compiling a 147–81 record with the Wildcats, and thereafter coaching at Utah from 1953 to 1971, compiling a 339–154 record. His career college record was 486–235 (.674).

In his second stint at Kansas State, following World War II, Gardner's teams won three conference crowns and captured two Big Eight Holiday Tournament championships. His 1950–51 team finished 25–4 and lost in the finals of the NCAA tournament to the University of Kentucky. That team was arguably the best in K-State history, and one of two that reached the Final Four during his tenure (the other was in 1948). He had six All-Americans at Kansas State, including Ernie Barrett.

Gardner left Manhattan, Kansas, in 1953 to take over the head coaching reins at the University of Utah in Salt Lake City, where he remained for 18 years. He led the Utes to six appearances in the NCAA tournament and two Final Four appearances (1961 & 1966). To date, Gardner remains one of only three coaches to twice lead two different programs to the Final Four, along with Roy Williams and Rick Pitino, and won eight conference titles. Between 1959 and 1962, his teams compiled a 72–14 (.837) record; Gardner was often referred to as "The Fox" and known for his fast-break style, putting the "run" into the "Runnin' Utes." He had five All-Americans at Utah, including Billy "The Hill" McGill.

Gardner is a member of the Naismith Basketball Hall of Fame as well as ten other Halls of Fame. He was inducted into the Kansas Sports Hall of Fame in 2000 and is also a member of the Southern Utah Hall of Fame, Utah All-Sports Hall of Fame, State of Utah Basketball Hall of Fame, Helms Foundation Hall of Fame, Kansas State University Hall of Fame, Crimson Club (University of Utah), Modesto Junior College Hall of Fame, Redlands High School Hall of Fame, and College Basketball Hall of Fame. He was also the recipient of the National Association of Basketball Coaches' Golden Anniversary Award.

Gardner worked as a consultant for the Utah Jazz of the National Basketball Association (NBA) from 1979 (when the team moved from New Orleans) until 1995. He is credited with discovering point guard John Stockton from Gonzaga University while working for the Jazz.

Gardner died at age 90 in 2000 in Salt Lake City.

== Head coaching record ==
Record table
Season	Team	Overall	Conference	Standing	Postseason
Kansas State Wildcats (Big Six Conference) (1939–1942)
1939–40	Kansas State	6–12	2–8	T–4th	
1940–41	Kansas State	6–12	3–7	5th	
1941–42	Kansas State	8–10	3–7	5th	
Kansas State Wildcats (Big Six / Big Seven Conference) (1946–1953)
1946–47	Kansas State	14–10	3–7	T–5th	
1947–48	Kansas State	22–6	9–3	1st	NCAA Final Four
1948–49	Kansas State	13–11	8–4	3rd	
1949–50	Kansas State	17–7	8–4	T–1st	
1950–51	Kansas State	25–4	11–1	1st	NCAA Runner-up
1951–52	Kansas State	19–5	10–2	2nd	
1952–53	Kansas State	17–4	9–3	2nd	
Kansas State:		147–81(.645)	66–46 (.589)		
Utah Utes (Skyline Conference) (1954–1962)
1953–54	Utah	12–14	7–7	T–4th	
1954–55	Utah	24–4	13–1	1st	NCAA Regional Third Place
1955–56	Utah	22–6	12–2	1st	NCAA Elite Eight
1956–57	Utah	19–8	10–4	2nd	
1957–58	Utah	20–7	9–5	T–2nd	NIT First Round
1958–59	Utah	21–7	13–1	1st	NCAA second round
1959–60	Utah	26–3	13–1	1st	NCAA second round
1960–61	Utah	23–8	12–2	T–1st	NCAA Final Four
1961–62	Utah	23–3	13–1	1st	
Utah Utes (Western Athletic Conference) (1962–1971)
1962–63	Utah	12–14	5–5	3rd	
1963–64	Utah	19–9	4–6	4th	
1964–65	Utah	17–9	3–7	6th	
1965–66	Utah	23–8	7–3	1st	NCAA Final Four
1966–67	Utah	15–11	5–5	T–3rd	
1967–68	Utah	17–9	5–5	T–2nd	
1968–69	Utah	13–13	5–5	T–2nd	
1969–70	Utah	18–10	9–5	2nd	NIT Second Round
1970–71	Utah	15–11	9–5	2nd	
Utah:		339–154 (.688)	153–70 (.686)		
Total:		486–235 (.674)			
National champion Postseason invitational champion Conference regular season champion Conference regular season and conference tournament champion Division regular season champion Division regular season and conference tournament champion Conference tournament champion

== See also ==
- List of NCAA Division I Men's Final Four appearances by coach
