= 1960–61 Saint Joseph's Hawks men's basketball team =

American college basketball season

1960–61 Saint Joseph's Hawks men's basketball

Middle Atlantic Conference Champions

NCAA tournament, Final Four
- Conference: Middle Atlantic Conferences

Ranking
- Coaches: No. 16
- Record: 25–5 (8–0 Mid-Atlantic)
- Head coach: Jack Ramsay (6th season)
- Home arena: Alumni Memorial Fieldhouse

1960–61 MAC men's basketball standings
| | Conf. | | | | Overall |
| Team | W | | L | PCT | W | | L | PCT |
|---|---|---|---|---|---|---|---|---|
University
| Saint Joseph's* | 8 | – | 0 | 1.000 | 25 | – | 5 | .833** |
| Temple | 9 | – | 1 | .900 | 20 | – | 8 | .714 |
| La Salle | 7 | – | 2 | .778 | 15 | – | 7 | .682 |
| Gettysburg | 8 | – | 4 | .667 | 19 | – | 6 | .760 |
| Lafayette | 6 | – | 6 | .500 | 16 | – | 8 | .667 |
| Bucknell | 5 | – | 6 | .455 | 12 | – | 11 | .522 |
| Rutgers | 3 | – | 6 | .333 | 11 | – | 10 | .524 |
| Lehigh | 4 | – | 10 | .286 | 5 | – | 16 | .238 |
| Delaware | 2 | – | 7 | .222 | 8 | – | 11 | .421 |
| Muhlenberg | 2 | – | 12 | .143 | 5 | – | 20 | .200 |
College–Northern
| Albright † | 12 | – | 1 | .923 | 19 | – | 9 | .679 |
| No. 6 Hofstra | 10 | – | 1 | .909 | 21 | – | 4 | .840 |
| Susquehanna | 9 | – | 4 | .692 | 17 | – | 6 | .739 |
| Moravian | 11 | – | 5 | .688 | 13 | – | 7 | .650 |
| Elizabethtown | 7 | – | 7 | .500 | 11 | – | 11 | .500 |
| Lebanon Valley | 8 | – | 8 | .500 | 10 | – | 9 | .526 |
| Wagner | 5 | – | 5 | .500 | 9 | – | 15 | .375 |
| Lycoming | 6 | – | 8 | .429 | 9 | – | 13 | .409 |
| Scranton | 4 | – | 8 | .333 | 5 | – | 18 | .217 |
| Wilkes | 4 | – | 11 | .267 | 7 | – | 15 | .318 |
| Upsala | 2 | – | 9 | .182 | | – | | – |
| Juniata | 1 | – | 10 | .091 | 1 | – | 17 | .056 |
| Stevens*** | 0 | – | 3 | .000 | | – | | – |
College–Southern
| Drexel | 11 | – | 2 | .846 | 12 | – | 5 | .706 |
| Western Maryland | 8 | – | 2 | .800 | 16 | – | 7 | .696 |
| Haverford | 8 | – | 4 | .667 | 12 | – | 5 | .706 |
| Dickinson | 9 | – | 5 | .643 | | – | | – |
| Franklin & Marshall | 6 | – | 7 | .462 | 8 | – | 11 | .421 |
| Pennsylvania Military | 5 | – | 10 | .333 | | – | | – |
| Ursinus | 4 | – | 9 | .308 | 6 | – | 11 | .353 |
| Swarthmore | 3 | – | 10 | .231 | 3 | – | 13 | .188 |
| Johns Hopkins | 1 | – | 9 | .100 | 4 | – | 16 | .200 |
| Washington (MD)*** | 4 | – | 4 | .500 | | – | | – |
| West Chester*** | 3 | – | 3 | .500 | | – | | – |
† 1961 MAC College Division men's basketball tournament winner * – Regular-season University Division champion ** – Overall record later adjuted to 22–4 (.846) *** – Ineligible for championship

The 1960–61 Saint Joseph's Hawks men's basketball team represented Saint Joseph's University as a member of the Middle Atlantic Conferences during the 1960–61 NCAA University Division men's basketball season. Led by 6th year head coach Jack Ramsay, the Hawks finished with an overall record of 25–5 (8–0 in Mid-Atlantic play). Saint Joseph's won the conference title, and received a bid to the NCAA tournament. The team defeated Princeton and Wake Forest to advance to the school's only Final Four to date before losing to No. 1 Ohio State in the National semifinals.

== Roster ==
1960–61 Saint Joseph's Hawks men's basketball team
Players
Coaches

| Pos. | # | Name | Height | Weight | Year | Previous school | Hometown |
|---|---|---|---|---|---|---|---|
| F | 12 | Jack Egan | 6 ft 5 in (1.96 m) | — | Sr |
| F | 42 | Tom Wynne | — | — | So |

Head coach

- Jack Ramsay (Saint Joseph's)

Assistant coach(es)

Legend

- (C) Team captain
- (S) Suspended
- (I) Ineligible
- (W) Walk-on
- Injured
- Current redshirt

== Schedule and results ==
| Date time, TV | Rank^{#} | Opponent^{#} | Result | Record | Site city, state |
Regular season
| Dec 1, 1960* | | Saint Peter's | W 84–69 | 1–0 | The Palestra; Philadelphia, Pennsylvania |
| Dec 8, 1960* | | Saint Francis (PA) | W 87–55 | 2–0 | The Palestra; Philadelphia, Pennsylvania |
| Dec 10, 1960* | | Dayton | L 65–67 | 2–1 | The Palestra; Philadelphia, Pennsylvania |
| Dec 13, 1960* | | West Chester | W 72–49 | 3–1 | Alumni Memorial Fieldhouse; Philadelphia, Pennsylvania |
| Dec 17, 1960 | | at Lehigh | W 81–61 | 4–1 (1–0) | Taylor Gym; Bethlehem, Pennsylvania |
| Dec 27, 1960* | | vs. No. 3 St. Bonaventure; ECAC Holiday Festival | L 70–83 | 4–2 | Madison Square Garden (17,036); New York, New York |
| Dec 29, 1960* | | vs. Penn; ECAC Holiday Festival | W 85–68 | 5–2 | Madison Square Garden; New York, New York |
| Dec 31, 1960* | | vs. Seton Hall; ECAC Holiday Festival | L 83–91 | 5–3 | Madison Square Garden; New York, New York |
| Jan 4, 1961* | | Seton Hall | W 72–71 ^{OT} | 6–3 | The Palestra; Philadelphia, Pennsylvania |
| Jan 6, 1961* | | at NYU | W 71–64 | 7–3 | Alumni Gymnasium; New York, New York |
| Jan 9, 1961 | | Delaware | W 84–56 | 8–3 (2–0) | Alumni Memorial Fieldhouse; Philadelphia, Pennsylvania |
| Jan 11, 1961* | | No. 5 St. John's | W 74–71 | 9–3 | The Palestra; Philadelphia, Pennsylvania |
| Jan 14, 1961* | | at Xavier | L 75–87 | 9–4 | Schmidt Fieldhouse; Cincinnati, Ohio |
| Jan 18, 1961* | | Kentucky Wesleyan | W 96–78 | 10–4 | The Palestra; Philadelphia, Pennsylvania |
| Jan 21, 1961 | | at Gettysburg | W 85–76 | 11–4 (3–0) | Plank Gym; Gettysburg, Pennsylvania |
| Jan 28, 1961* | | vs. Villanova | W 64–63 | 12–4 | Philadelphia, Pennsylvania; The Palestra |
| Jan 31, 1961* | | at Wake Forest | W 72–70 | 13–4 | Winston-Salem Memorial Coliseum; Winston-Salem, North Carolina |
| Feb 4, 1961 | | vs. La Salle | W 65–54 | 14–4 (4–0) | The Palestra; Philadelphia, Pennsylvania |
| Feb 7, 1961* | | Elizabethtown | W 98–65 | 15–4 | Alumni Memorial Fieldhouse; Philadelphia, Pennsylvania |
| Feb 11, 1961 | | Lafayette | W 93–77 | 16–4 (5–0) | The Palestra; Philadelphia, Pennsylvania |
| Feb 14, 1961* | | vs. Penn | W 88–73 | 17–4 | The Palestra; Philadelphia, Pennsylvania |
| Feb 18, 1961 | | vs. Temple | W 86–83 ^{OT} | 18–4 (6–0) | The Palestra (9,246); Philadelphia, Pennsylvania |
| Feb 22, 1961 | | at Bucknell | W 92–67 | 19–4 (7–0) | Davis Gym; Lewisburg, Pennsylvania |
| Feb 25, 1961 | | Muhlenberg | W 81–72 | 20–4 (8–0) | The Palestra; Philadelphia, Pennsylvania |
| Feb 28, 1961* | | Albright | W 76–74 | 21–4 | Alumni Memorial Fieldhouse; Philadelphia, Pennsylvania |
| Mar 11, 1961* | | vs. Temple | W 72–62 | 22–4 | The Palestra (9,202); Philadelphia, Pennsylvania |
NCAA Tournament
| Mar 17, 1961* | | vs. Princeton; Regional semifinal – Sweet Sixteen | W 72–67 | 23–4 | Charlotte Coliseum (12,000); Charlotte, North Carolina |
| Mar 18, 1961* | | vs. Wake Forest; Regional final – Elite Eight | W 96–86 | 24–4 | Charlotte Coliseum (12,000); Charlotte, North Carolina |
| Mar 24, 1961* | | vs. No. 1 Ohio State; National semifinal – Final Four | L 69–95 | 24–5 | Municipal Auditorium (10,700); Kansas City, Missouri |
| Mar 25, 1961* | | vs. Utah; Consolation | W 127–120 ^{4OT} | 25–5 | Municipal Auditorium (10,700); Kansas City, Missouri |
*Non-conference game. ^{#}Rankings from AP Poll. (#) Tournament seedings in parentheses. W=West.

== Awards and honors ==
- Jack Egan – AP Honorable Mention All-American
