= UNT Coliseum =

Multi-purpose arena in Denton, Texas

- "The Super Pit"

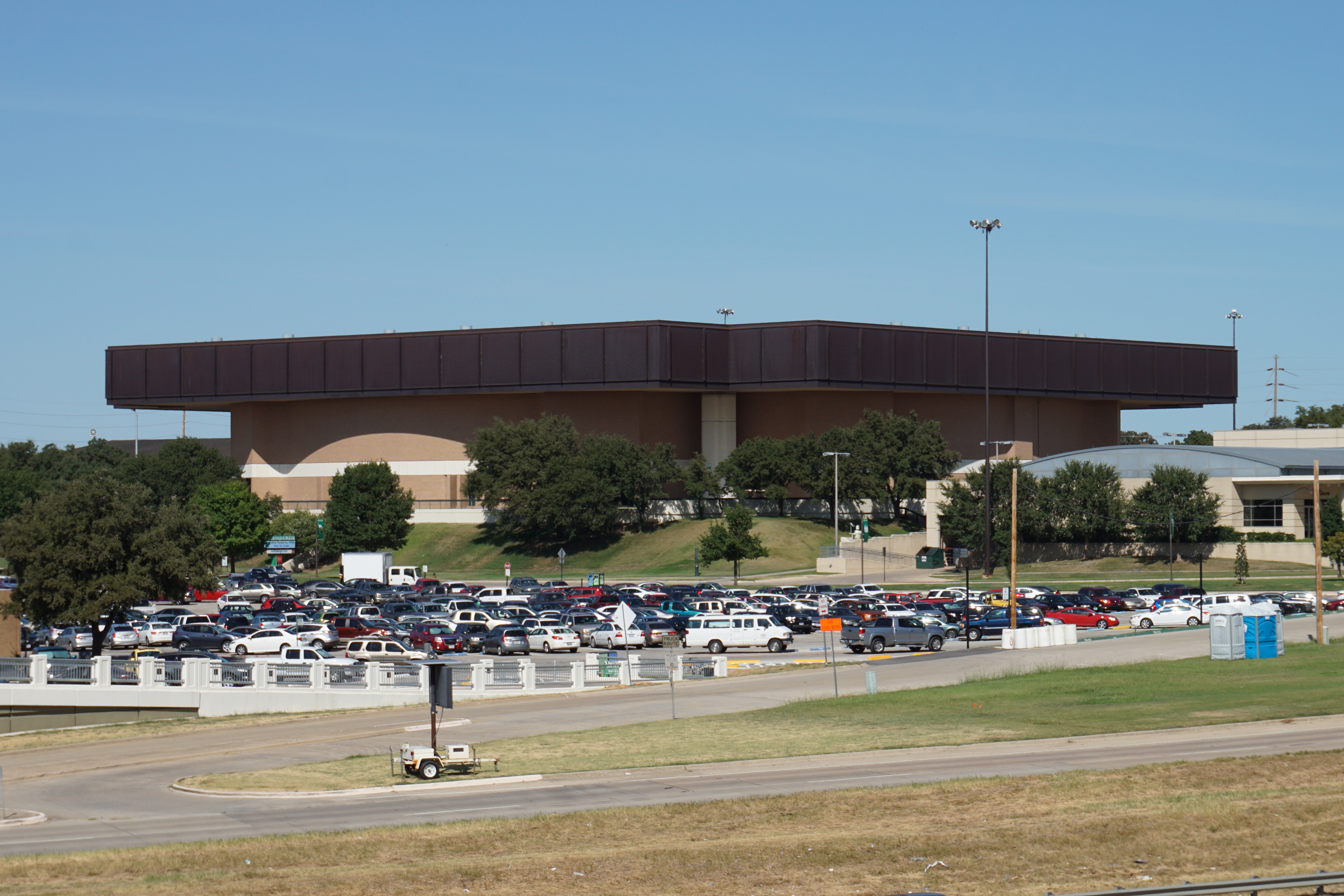
- Interactive map of UNT Coliseum
- Location: 801 North Texas Boulevard; Denton, Texas 76201 USA
- Coordinates: 33°12′30″N 97°9′14″W
- Owner: University of North Texas
- Operator: University of North Texas
- Capacity: 9,797
- Record attendance: 10,600 (1/22/1977 vs. SMU)

Construction
- Groundbreaking: March 1971
- Opened: March 27, 1973
- Cost: $7.5 million ($54.4 million in 2025 dollars)
- Architects: Clutts & Parker, Inc.
- General contractor: Manhattan Construction Company

Tenants
- North Texas MBB (1973–present); North Texas WBB (1976–present); North Texas Steam (AAL) (2027-present)

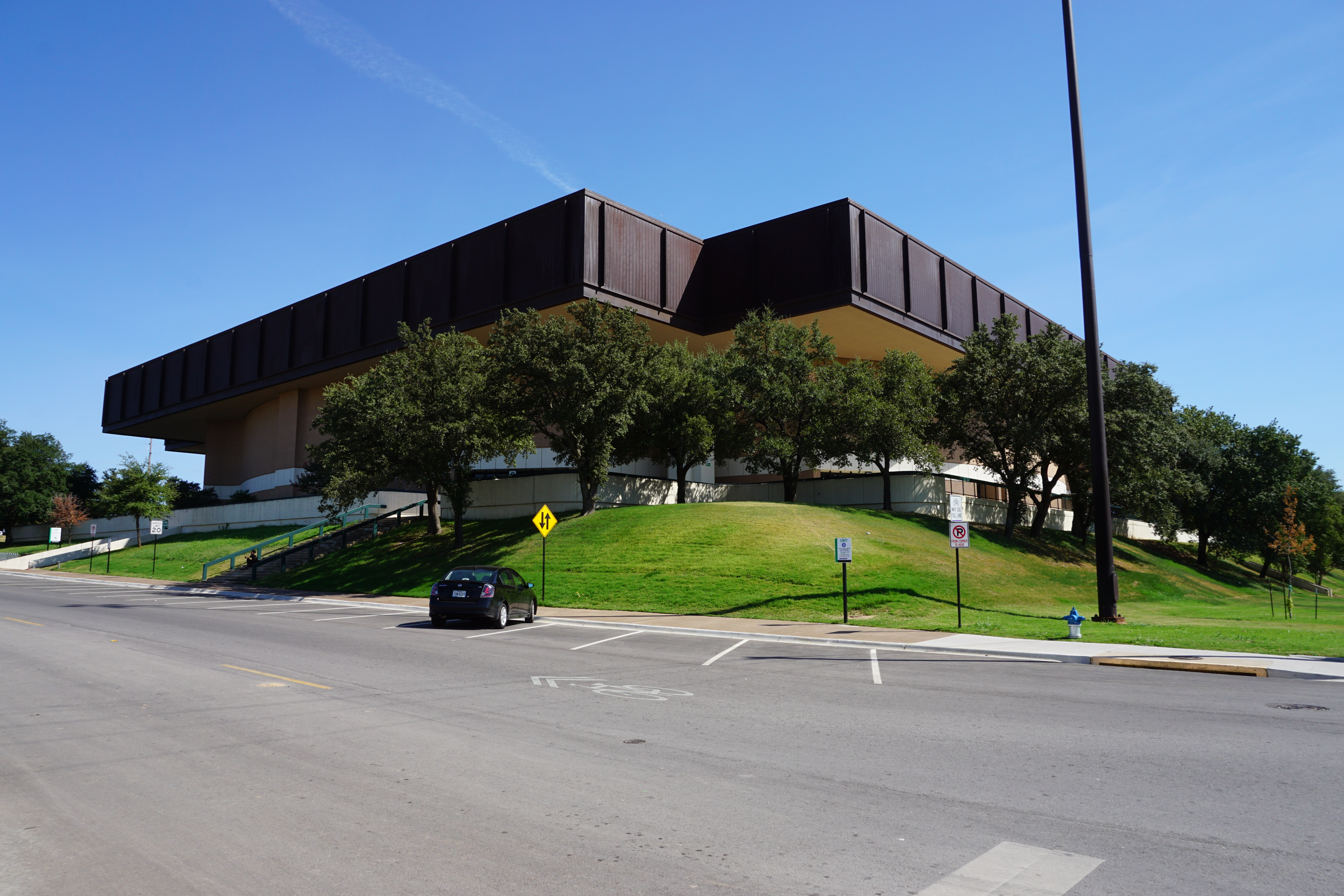
The UNT Coliseum in 2015

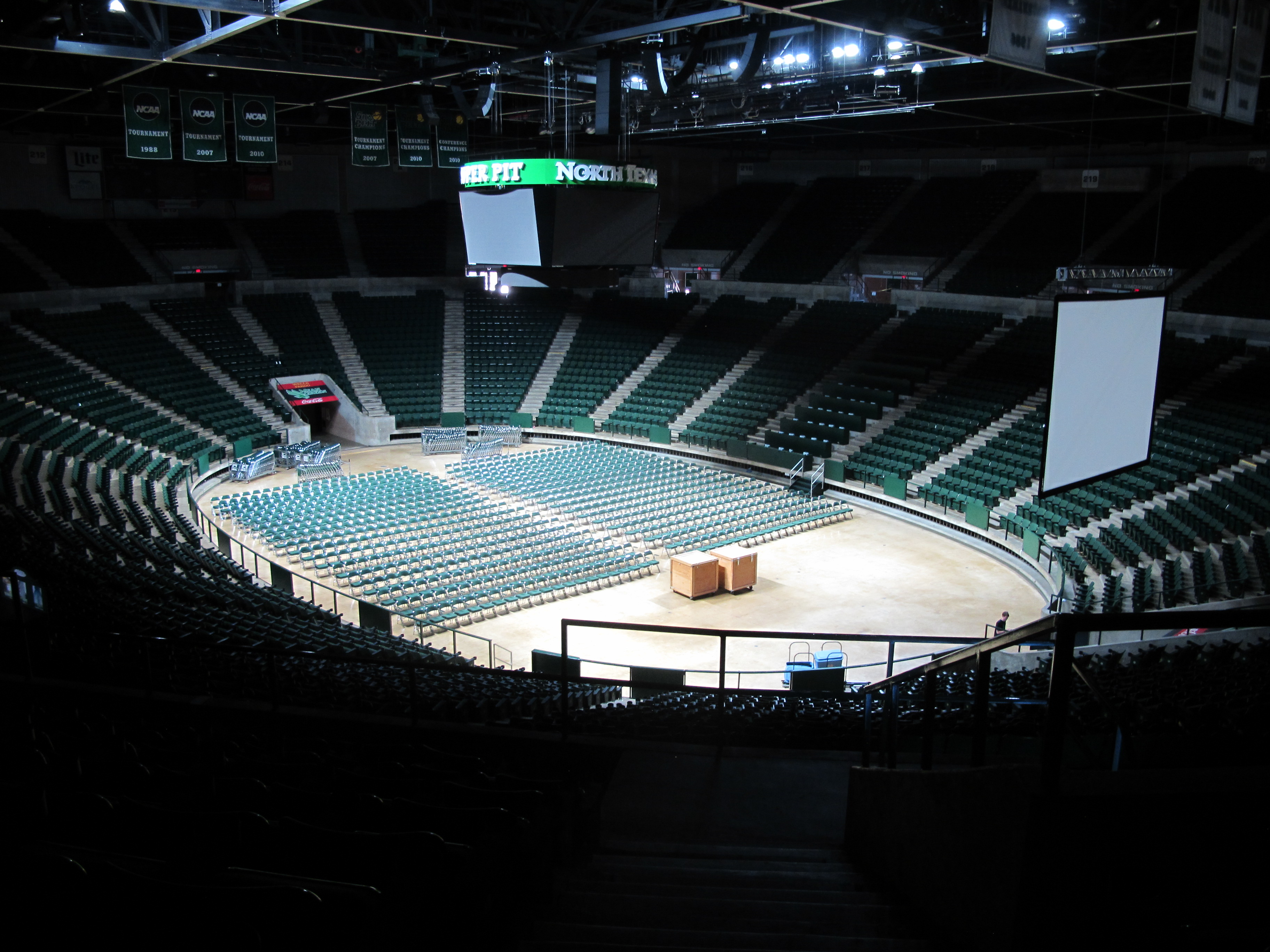
UNT Coliseum, Interior 2016

The UNT Coliseum is a 9,797-seat multi-purpose arena located in Denton, Texas, United States, built in 1973. While the arena's formal name is the UNT Coliseum, the building is more commonly referred to as the Super Pit, a nickname derived from its proximity to the former home of the Mean Green basketball teams, the Ken Bahnsen Gym, nicknamed the Snake Pit. Most signage inside the stadium uses the Super Pit name; the most prominent usage of the UNT Coliseum name is above a single new set of ticket windows added during 2017 renovations.

== History ==
The arena opened in 1973 and has undergone very few changes since its opening, mainly due to the unusual physical construction of the building in which the lower concourse is supported by beams underneath the walkways that run the length of the building as well as the media section being placed at half court on the western side of the arena. Due to the prior home of the Mean Green being famous for noise, the Coliseum was designed specifically to retain noise and as such, the Mean Green have maintained a high winning percentage at the facility. In recent years there have been few upgrades, with the exception of the seats being repainted green from their original color of bright orange and the stadium's sound and video boards undergoing a massive renovation with the introduction of 4 center-hung LED scoreboards.

Despite the building's main usage as the home of the Mean Green, over the years it has hosted many famous concerts, notably Pearl Jam in 1993 and J. Cole in 2014. In addition to concerts, the arena routinely holds area graduations, festivals, cheer, dance and gymnastic competitions and has hosted the 1988 Southland Conference Tournament. It was also highly lauded upon completion, holding first and second-round games of the 1976 NCAA basketball tournaments. North Texas has compiled a winning percentage of over .640 at the Pit. During the 1975–1983 era under men's coach Bill Blakeley, North Texas, playing primarily as an independent, recorded three 20-win seasons, its first-ever top-20 ranking, the four biggest crowds in Super Pit history and memorable wins over Texas, Kansas State and a sell-out crowd against SMU, which to this date, is the highest-attended basketball game at the arena.

Due to the facility's age, in the mid-2010s the UNT administration was looking into large-scale renovations of the aging facility, citing the notoriously poor lighting and need for improved infrastructure.

In October 2026 the arena was announced as the home for the North Texas Steam, a new arena football team, for their debut season in 2027.

== Largest crowds ==
Top Ten Super Pit Crowds
| Rank | Game | Date | Attendance |
|---|---|---|---|
| 1 | UNT vs SMU | January 21, 1977 | 10,600 |
| 2 | UNT vs DePaul | December 16, 1980 | 9,100 |
| 3 | UNT vs West Texas State | March 1, 1976 | 8,816 |
| 4 | UNT vs Louisiana Tech | February 26, 2022 | 8,522 |
| 5 | UNT vs Western Kentucky | February 9, 2019 | 8,195 |
| 6 | UNT vs Texas | January 17, 1980 | 8,100 |
| 7 | UNT vs. SMU | January 25, 2024 | 7,239 |
| 8 | UNT vs Texas Tech | November 16, 2010 | 7,105 |
| 9 | UNT vs Texas-Pan American | March 2, 1977 | 7,100 |
| 10 | UNT vs Bradley | February 28, 1976 | 7,087 |

== See also ==
- List of NCAA Division I basketball arenas
