= 1960–61 St. John's Redmen basketball team =

American college basketball season

1960–61 St. John's Redmen men's basketball

NCAA Tournament, First Round
- Conference: Metropolitan New York Conference

Ranking
- Coaches: No. 8
- Record: 20–5 (4–0 Metropolitan New York)
- Head coach: Joe Lapchick (16th season)
- Assistant coach: Lou Carnesecca (3rd season)
- Captain: Tony Jackson
- Home arena: Madison Square Garden

1960–61 Metropolitan New York Conference men's basketball standings
	Conf.				Overall
Team	W		L	PCT	W		L	PCT
St. John's	4	–	0	1.000	20	–	5	.800
NYU	2	–	1	.667	12	–	11	.522
St. Francis (NY)	2	–	1	.667	10	–	10	.500
CCNY	1	–	1	.500	7	–	10	.412
Manhattan	1	–	2	.333	8	–	11	.421
Brooklyn	0	–	2	.000	4	–	14	.222
Fordham	0	–	3	.000	7	–	16	.304
Rankings from AP Poll

The 1960–61 St. John's Redmen basketball team represented St. John's University during the 1960–61 college basketball season.

== Roster ==
#	Name	Height	Position	Class	Hometown	Previous Team(s)
10	Bob Larranaga	6'2"	G	Jr.	Bronx, NY, U.S.	St. Helena's HS
11	Bill O'Sullivan	6'7"	F/C	So.	N/A	N/A
15	Bill Goldy	N/A	G	Jr.	Blackwood, NJ, U.S.	Gloucester Catholic HS
20	Willie Hall	6'4"	G/F	Jr.	New York, NY, U.S.	Archbishop Molloy HS
22	Gary Marozas	6'6"	F/C	Sr.	Queens, NY, U.S.	Forest Hills HS
23	Kevin Loughery	6'3"	G	RS Jr.	Bronx, NY, U.S.	Cardinal Hayes HS/Boston College
24	Tony Jackson (C)	6"4"	G/F	Sr.	Brooklyn, NY, U.S.	Thomas Jefferson HS
25	LeRoy Ellis	6'11"	C	Jr.	Brooklyn, NY, U.S.	Thomas Jefferson HS
30	Fred Edelman	6'4"	G/F	Jr.	Queens, NY, U.S.	Forest Hills HS
33	Ivan Kovac	5"11"	G	Jr.	Queens, NY, U.S.	Bayside HS
34	Walt Carroll	N/A	F	So.	N/A	N/A
	Donnie Burks	5'10"	G	So.	New York, NY, U.S.	Archbishop Molloy HS

== Schedule ==
Date time, TV	Rank^{#}	Opponent^{#}	Result	Record	Site city, state
Regular Season
December 3, 1960*		Army	W 69–49	1–0	Madison Square Garden; New York, NY
December 7, 1960*		Bridgeport	W 109–59	2–0	Martin Van Buren High School; Queens, NY
December 9, 1960*		Kansas	W 66–54	3–0	Madison Square Garden; New York, NY
December 16, 1960*	No. 7	Ohio	W 78–50	4–0	Madison Square Garden; New York, NY
December 20, 1960*	No. 6	at Pittsburgh	W 87–56	5–0	Fitzgerald Field House; Pittsburgh, PA
December 22, 1960*	No. 6	vs. Gonzaga	W 97–69	6–0	Rose Hill Gymnasium; Bronx, NY
December 27, 1960*	No. 7	vs. No. 15 Providence; ECAC Holiday Festival	W 76–54	7–0	Madison Square Garden; New York, NY
December 29, 1960*	No. 7	vs. No. 1 Ohio State; ECAC Holiday Festival	L 65–70	7–1	Madison Square Garden; New York, NY
December 31, 1960*	No. 7	vs. Utah; ECAC Holiday Festival	W 73–65	8–1	Madison Square Garden; New York, NY
January 6, 1961*	No. 5	Temple	W 81–60	9–1	Madison Square Garden; New York, NY
January 11, 1961*	No. 5	at St. Joseph's	L 71–74	9–2	The Palestra; Philadelphia, PA
January 14, 1961	No. 5	vs. St. Francis (NY)	W 67–51	10–2 (1–0)	Queens College; Flushing, NY
January 27, 1961*	No. 7	at St. Louis	L 57–60 ^{10–3}		Kiel Auditorium; St. Louis, MO
January 30, 1961*	No. 7	vs. Creighton	W 84–75	11–3	Rose Hill Gymnasium; Bronx, NY
February 2, 1961*	No. 7	at Notre Dame	L 63–64	11–4	Notre Dame Fieldhouse; Notre Dame, IN
February 7, 1961*		vs. Loyola (IL)	W 98–74	12–4	Rose Hill Gymnasium; Bronx, NY
February 11, 1961*		at Syracuse	W 95–60	13–4	Onondaga County War Memorial; Syracuse, NY
February 14, 1961*		at George Washington	W 98–80	14–4	Fort Myer Ceremonial Hall; Washington, D.C.
February 18, 1961*		vs. Niagara	W 84–64	15–4	Queens College; Queens, NY
February 23, 1961*		Marquette	W 85–69	16–4	Madison Square Garden; New York, NY
February 25, 1961		at Fordham	W 80–66	17–4 (2–0)	Rose Hill Gymnasium; Bronx, NY
March 2, 1961*		at Rhode Island	W 86–74	18–4	Keaney Gymnasium; Kingston, RI
March 4, 1961		vs. Manhattan	W 87–68	19–4 (3–0)	Madison Square Garden; New York, NY
March 9, 1961		vs. NYU	W 76–64	20–4 (4–0)	Madison Square Garden; New York, NY
NCAA Tournament
March 14, 1961*		vs. Wake Forest; NCAA Tournament • First Round	L 74–97	20–5	Madison Square Garden; New York, NY
*Non-conference game. ^{#}Rankings from AP Poll. (#) Tournament seedings in parentheses. E=East.
