= 1961 NCAA University Division basketball tournament =

Edition of USA college basketball tournament

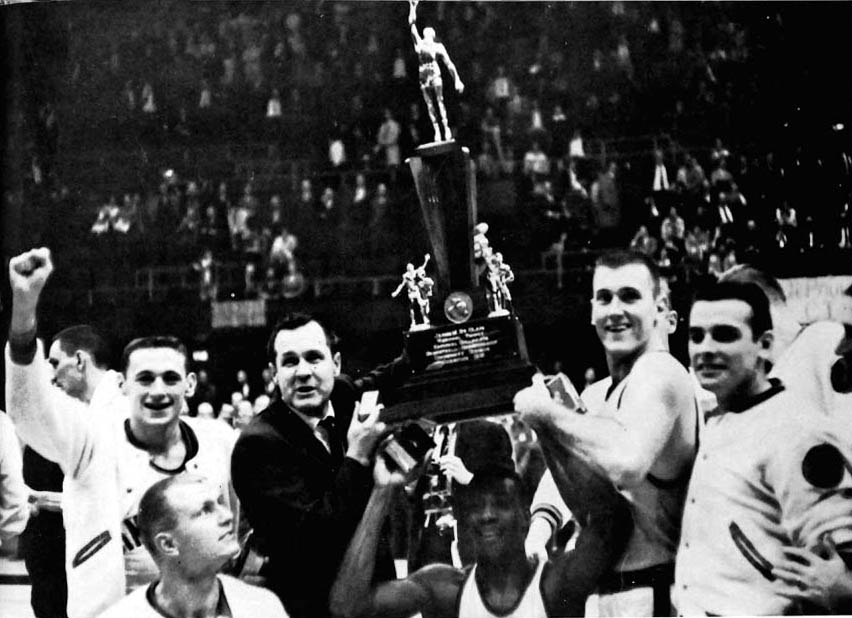
- Cincinnati Bearcats, champions, celebrating
- Season: 1960–61
- Teams: 24
- Finals site: Municipal Auditorium, Kansas City, Missouri
- Champions: Cincinnati Bearcats (1st title, 1st title game, 3rd Final Four)
- Runner-up: Ohio State Buckeyes (3rd title game, 6th Final Four)
- Semifinalists: Saint Joseph's Hawks (Vacated) (1st Final Four); Utah Redskins (2nd Final Four)
- Winning coach: Ed Jucker (1st title)
- MOP: Jerry Lucas (Ohio State)
- Attendance: 169,520
- Top scorer: Billy McGill (Utah) (119 points)

The 1961 NCAA University Division basketball tournament involved 24 schools playing in single-elimination play to determine the national champion of men's NCAA Division I college basketball in the United States. The 23rd annual edition of the tournament began on March 14, 1961, and ended with the championship game on March 25, at Municipal Auditorium in Kansas City, Missouri. A total of 28 games were played, including a third place game in each region and a national third place game.

Cincinnati, coached by Ed Jucker, won the national title with a 70–65 victory in the final game over in-state rival and defending national champion Ohio State, coached by Fred Taylor. Jerry Lucas of Ohio State was named the tournament's Most Outstanding Player.

The national third-place game, won by Saint Joseph's over Utah by the score of 127–120 in four overtimes, tied the record for the longest game in NCAA Division I tournament history, set in 1956 in a first-round game between Canisius and North Carolina State. As of the regional finals of the 2019 tournament, no NCAA Division I tournament games since then have gone to a fourth overtime period. Saint Joseph's victory was later vacated because of the 1961 gambling scandal.

== Locations ==
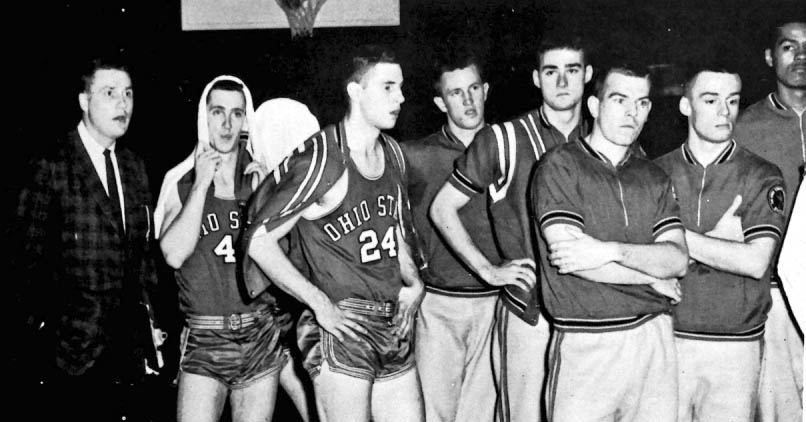
Ohio State players after losing the final v Cincinnati

Round	Region	Site	Venue	Host(s)
First Round	East	New York, New York	Madison Square Garden	
First Round	Mideast	Louisville, Kentucky	Freedom Hall	Louisville
First Round	Midwest	Houston, Texas	Delmar Fieldhouse	Houston
First Round	West	Portland, Oregon	Memorial Coliseum	
Regionals	East	Charlotte, North Carolina	Charlotte Coliseum	
Regionals	Mideast	Louisville, Kentucky	Freedom Hall	Louisville
Regionals	Midwest	Lawrence, Kansas	Allen Fieldhouse	Kansas
Regionals	West	Portland, Oregon	Memorial Coliseum	
Final Four		Kansas City, Missouri	Municipal Auditorium	

== Teams ==
Region	Team	Coach	Conference	Finished	Final Opponent	Score
East
East	George Washington	Bill Reinhart	Southern	First round	Princeton	L 84–67
East	Princeton	Jake McCandless	Ivy League	Regional Fourth Place	St. Bonaventure	L 85–67
East	Rhode Island	Ernie Calverley	Yankee	First round	St. Bonaventure	L 86–76
East	St. Bonaventure	Eddie Donovan	Independent	Regional third place	Princeton	W 85–67
East	St. John's	Joe Lapchick	Metro NY	First round	Wake Forest	L 97–74
East	Saint Joseph's	Jack Ramsay	Middle Atlantic	Third Place	Utah	W 127–120 (4OT)
East	Wake Forest	Bones McKinney	Atlantic Coast	Regional Runner-up	Saint Joseph's	L 96–86
Mideast
Mideast	Kentucky	Adolph Rupp	Southeastern	Regional Runner-up	Ohio State	L 87–74
Mideast	Louisville	Peck Hickman	Independent	Regional third place	Morehead State	W 83–61
Mideast	Morehead State	Robert Laughlin	Ohio Valley	Regional Fourth Place	Louisville	L 83–61
Mideast	Ohio	James Snyder	Mid-American	First round	Louisville	L 76–70
Mideast	Ohio State	Fred Taylor	Big Ten	Runner Up	Cincinnati	L 70–65
Mideast	Xavier	Jim McCafferty	Independent	First round	Morehead State	L 71–66
Midwest
Midwest	Cincinnati	Ed Jucker	Missouri Valley	Champion	Ohio State	W 70–65
Midwest	Houston	Guy Lewis	Independent	Regional Fourth Place	Texas Tech	L 69–67
Midwest	Kansas State	Tex Winter	Big 8	Regional Runner-up	Cincinnati	L 69–64
Midwest	Marquette	Eddie Hickey	Independent	First round	Houston	L 77–61
Midwest	Texas Tech	Polk Robison	Southwest	Regional third place	Houston	W 69–67
West
West	Arizona State	Ned Wulk	Border	Regional Runner-up	Utah	L 88–80
West	Loyola (Los Angeles)	William Donovan	West Coast Athletic	Regional third place	USC	W 69–67
West	Oregon	Steve Belko	Independent	First round	USC	L 81–79
West	Seattle	Vince Cazzetta	Independent	First round	Arizona State	L 72–70
West	USC	Forrest Twogood	AAWU	Regional Fourth Place	Loyola (Los Angeles)	L 69–67
West	Utah	Jack Gardner	Mountain States	Fourth Place	Saint Joseph's	L 127–120 (4OT)

== Bracket ==
* – Denotes overtime period

=== East region ===
Quarterfinals
Princeton	84
George Washington	67
St. Bonaventure	86
Rhode Island	76
Wake Forest	97
St. John's	74

Semifinals
Saint Joseph's#	72
Princeton	67
St. Bonaventure	73
Wake Forest	78

Finals
Saint Joseph's#	96
Wake Forest	86

=== Mideast region ===
Quarterfinals
Louisville	76
Ohio	70
Morehead State	71
Xavier	66

Semifinals
Ohio State	56
Louisville	55
Kentucky	71
Morehead State	64

Finals
Ohio State	87
Kentucky	74

=== Midwest region ===
Quarterfinals
Houston	77
Marquette	61

Semifinals
Kansas State	75
Houston	64
Cincinnati	78
Texas Tech	55

Finals
Kansas State	64
Cincinnati	69

=== West region ===
Quarterfinals
Arizona State	72
Seattle	70
USC	81
Oregon	79

Semifinals
Utah	91
Loyola (Los Angeles)	75
Arizona State	86
USC	71

Finals
Utah	88
Arizona State	80

=== Final Four ===
National Semifinals
E	Saint Joseph's#	69
ME	Ohio State	95
MW	Cincinnati	82
W	Utah	67

National Championship Game
ME	Ohio State	65*
MW	Cincinnati	70

* - denotes overtime

# - Saint Joseph's was later forced to vacate their appearance in the 1961 NCAA Tournament due to a gambling scandal involving a player on the team. Unlike forfeiture, a vacated game does not result in the other school being credited with a win, only with Saint Joseph's removing the wins from its own record.

=== National Third Place Game ===
National Third Place Game
E	Saint Joseph's#	127
W	Utah	120****

=== Regional third place games ===
East Regional third place
St. Bonaventure	85
Princeton	67

Mideast Regional third place
Louisville	83
Morehead State	61

Midwest Regional third place
Texas Tech	69
Houston	67

West Regional third place
Loyola (Los Angeles)	69
USC	67

== See also ==
- 1961 NCAA College Division basketball tournament
- 1961 National Invitation Tournament
- 1961 NAIA basketball tournament
