= 1960–61 Washington State Cougars men's basketball team =

American college basketball season

1960–61 Washington State Cougars men's basketball
- Conference: Independent
- Record: 10–16
- Head coach: Marv Harshman (3rd season)
- Home arena: Bohler Gymnasium

The 1960–61 Washington State Cougars men's basketball team represented Washington State University for the 1960–61 NCAA college basketball season. Led by third-year head coach Marv Harshman, the Cougars were an independent and played their home games on campus at Bohler Gymnasium in Pullman, Washington.

The Cougars were 10–16 overall in the regular season, and dropped both games to rival Washington.

Washington State was 5–10 against the former Northern Division of the Pacific Coast Conference: Washington (0–2), Oregon (2–3), Oregon State (1–3), and Palouse neighbor Idaho (2–2).
