= 1960–61 Atlantic Coast Conference men's basketball season =

== Final standings ==
Team	ACC Regular Season	ACC %	All Games	All Games %	Nonconference Games	Nonconference Games %	Ranked AP All	Ranked AP All %	Ranked AP Nonconference	Ranked AP Nonconference %
North Carolina	12–2	.857	19–4	.826	5–2	.714	4–3	.571	0–2	.000
Wake Forest	11–3	.786	19–11	.633	6–7	.462	4–6	.400	2–3	.400
Duke	10–4	.714	22–6	.786	10–0	1.000	3–4	.429	1–0	1.000
NC State	8–6	.571	16–9	.640	6–2	.750	2–6	.250	0–1	.000
Maryland	6–8	.429	14–12	.538	7–1	.875	1–7	.125	0–0	----
Clemson	5–9	.357	10–16	.385	5–6	.455	0–6	.000	0–0	----
South Carolina	2–12	.143	9–17	.346	6–4	.600	1–6	.143	0–0	----
Virginia	2–12	.143	3–23	.115	1–10	.091	0–8	.000	0–1	.000
Total			112–98	.533	46–32	.590			3–7	.300

== ACC tournament ==
See 1961 ACC men's basketball tournament

== NCAA tournament ==
=== Round of 24 ===
Wake Forest 97, St John's 74

=== Regional semi-finals ===
Wake Forest 78, St Bonaventure 73

=== Regional finals ===
Saint Joseph's 96, Wake Forest 86

=== ACC's NCAA record ===
2–1

== NIT ==
League rules prevented ACC teams from playing in the NIT, 1954–1966
