= 1960–61 Texas Tech Red Raiders basketball team =

American college basketball season

1960–61 Texas Tech Red Raiders basketball

SWC regular season champion

NCAA Men's Division I Basketball Tournament Sweet Sixteen, L, 78–55 v. Cincinnati
- Conference: Southwest Conference

Ranking
- Coaches: No. 19
- Record: 14–11 (11–3 SWC)
- Head coach: Polk Robison (14th season)
- Home arena: Lubbock Municipal Coliseum

The 1960–61 Texas Tech Red Raiders men's basketball team represented Texas Tech University in the Southwest Conference during the 1960–61 NCAA University Division men's basketball season. The head coach was Polk Robison, his 14th and final year with the team. Robison became the Texas Tech athletic director the next year. The Red Raiders played their home games in the Lubbock Municipal Coliseum in Lubbock, Texas.
