= 1961 ACC men's basketball tournament =

- Classification: Division I
- Season: 1960–61
- Teams: 7
- Site: Reynolds Coliseum; Raleigh, North Carolina
- Champions: Wake Forest (1st title)
- Winning coach: Bones McKinney (1st title)
- MVP: Len Chappell (Wake Forest)

The 1961 Atlantic Coast Conference men's basketball tournament was held in Raleigh, North Carolina, at Reynolds Coliseum from March 2–4, 1961. Wake Forest defeated Duke, 96–81, to win the championship. Len Chappell of Wake Forest was named tournament MVP.

North Carolina did not participate because the program was on NCAA probation. As a result, top seed Wake Forest received a first-round bye. The only other times an ACC team opted out of the tournament were Maryland in 1991, Syracuse in 2015, and Louisville in 2016 for similar reasons.

== Bracket ==
Quarterfinals; March 2
4	Maryland	91
5	Clemson	75
2	#9 Duke	89
7	Virginia	54
3	NC State	78
6	South Carolina	80

Semifinals; March 3
1	Wake Forest	98
4	Maryland	76
2	#9 Duke	92
6	South Carolina	75

Championship Game; March 4
1	Wake Forest	96
2	#9 Duke	81
