= Lockland Wayne High School =

All African-American public high school in Lockland, Ohio

Coordinates: 39.228066°N 84.451369°W

Lockland Wayne High School was an all African-American public high school in Lockland, Ohio. Its motto was "Lest We Forget Continuing The Dream." Opening in 1938, the school closed in 1958.

== History ==
Lockland Wayne was located near the city limits of Cincinnati in Hamilton County. It is historically significant as having an all-black student class; all-black faculty, and all-black support staff. Alumni continue to hold reunions every two years.

Before the school opened its doors, the students attended Lockland High School. Many of the students walked to school from Lockland and neighboring Lincoln Heights and Woodlawn; some children walked 5 miles (8.0 km) to school.

The black residents wanted a high school for many reasons but most of all to ensure their children had the best opportunity to learn in an environment which fosters excellence in academia, sports, drama, music, and throughout all areas of the school's curriculum with teachers who looked like them.

In the last summer of 1936 residents of Lockland voted to approve a $55,000 Bond Issue and received an additional $45,000 from a Federal Grant to build and extension to the old Wayne School building.

Lockland Wayne High School 1938–1958 graduated the first class of students in 1941. The school building was an extension of the old Wayne elementary school with 12 classrooms with an auditorium which doubles as a gymnasium.

== Sports ==
=== First All-African American boys basketball state championship ===
The 1952 Lockland-Wayne Panthers was the first all African-American boys basketball team to win a state championship. March 22, 1952, in the state capital, Columbus Ohio, Lockland Wayne defeated Nelsonville, 56–46, in the Class B championship game.

=== The team captured a second state championship in 1955 ===
The school won the 1952 state championship until the school was shuttered in 1958.

=== Assistant Coach Joseph Martin ===
In the twenty years, the school had one principal Joseph E. (Joe) Martin. In addition to his role as educator and administrator, he was also the boys' basketball coach for the state championship teams (1952–1955).

In 1960, Martin was appointed assistant coach of the NBA Cincinnati Royals. He was the first African-American to hold this position in the National Basketball Association.

== Notable graduates ==
- Tony Yates, retired college basketball player and coach. He was on the team that won the 1952 Ohio high school basketball championship.
