= 1960–61 Wake Forest Demon Deacons men's basketball team =

American college basketball season

1960–61 Wake Forest Demon Deacons men's basketball

ACC Tournament champion

NCAA Men's Division I Tournament, Elite Eight
- Conference: Atlantic Coast Conference

Ranking
- Coaches: No. 10
- Record: 19–11 (11–3 ACC)
- Head coach: Bones McKinney (4th season)
- Home arena: Winston-Salem Memorial Coliseum

1960–61 ACC men's basketball standings
| | Conf. | | | | Overall |
| Team | W | | L | PCT | W | | L | PCT |
|---|---|---|---|---|---|---|---|---|
| No. 5 North Carolina | 12 | – | 2 | .857 | 19 | – | 4 | .826 |
| Wake Forest † | 11 | – | 3 | .786 | 19 | – | 11 | .633 |
| No. 10 Duke | 10 | – | 4 | .714 | 22 | – | 6 | .786 |
| NC State | 8 | – | 6 | .571 | 16 | – | 9 | .640 |
| Maryland | 6 | – | 8 | .429 | 14 | – | 12 | .538 |
| Clemson | 5 | – | 9 | .357 | 10 | – | 16 | .385 |
| South Carolina | 2 | – | 12 | .143 | 9 | – | 17 | .346 |
| Virginia | 2 | – | 12 | .143 | 3 | – | 23 | .115 |
† 1961 ACC tournament winner Rankings from AP Poll

The 1960–61 Wake Forest Demon Deacons men's basketball team represented Wake Forest University.

== Roster ==
1960–61 Wake Forest Demon Deacons men's basketball team
Players
Coaches

| Pos. | # | Name | Height | Weight | Year | Hometown |
|---|---|---|---|---|---|---|
| G | | Billy Packer | — | — | Jr | Bethlehem, Pennsylvania |
| F/C | 50 | Len Chappell | 6 ft 8 in (2.03 m) | 230 lb (104 kg) | Jr | Portage, Pennsylvania |

Head coach

- Bones McKinney

Assistant coach(es)

Legend

- (C) Team captain
- (S) Suspended
- (I) Ineligible
- (W) Walk-on
- Injured
- Current redshirt

== Schedule and results ==
=== NCAA basketball tournament ===
- East
  - Wake Forest 97, St. Johns 74
  - Wake Forest 78, St. Bonaventure 73
  - St. Joseph’s, Pennsylvania 96, Wake Forest 86

== Awards and honors ==
- Len Chappell – ACC Player of the Year

== Team players drafted into the NBA ==
No one from the Demon Deacons was selected in the 1961 NBA draft.
