= Fred Taylor (basketball, born 1924) =

American baseball player and basketball coach (1924–2002)

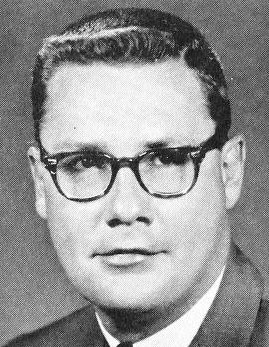
- Taylor, circa 1966

Biographical details
- Born: December 3, 1924; Zanesville, Ohio, U.S.
- Died: January 6, 2002 (aged 77); Columbus, Ohio, U.S.

Playing career
- 1948–1950: Ohio State

Coaching career (HC unless noted)

Basketball
- 1958: Ohio State (assistant)

Basketball
- 1958–1976: Ohio State

Head coaching record
- Overall: 297–158 (.653)
- Tournaments: 14–4

Accomplishments and honors

Championships
- NCAA Division I (1960); 4× NCAA Division I Regional—Final Four (1960–1962, 1968); 7× Big Ten (1960–1964, 1968, 1971); 2 Henry Iba Award (1961, 1962)
- Basketball Hall of Fame; Inducted in 1986 (profile)
- College Basketball Hall of Fame; Inducted in 2006

Frederick Rankin Taylor (December 3, 1924 – January 6, 2002) was an American college men's basketball coach for Ohio State University from 1959 to 1976. Prior to that, he played baseball for the Washington Senators.

== College career ==
After graduating from Lash High School in Zanesville in 1943, Taylor entered the United States Army Air Forces where he served from 1943 to 1946. Despite never having played high school basketball, he became a player at Ohio State and was the starting forward on the 1950 Big Ten Conference championship basketball team. Taylor learned to play basketball while in the Army Air Forces playing under Captain Rowland Wenzel going undefeated. In addition he was Ohio State University's first All-American baseball player. His number 27 is retired at Ohio State.

== Professional baseball career ==
Fred Taylor
- First baseman
- Born: December 3, 1924; Zanesville, Ohio
- Died: January 6, 2002 (aged 77); Columbus, Ohio
- Batted: Left Threw: Right

MLB debut
- September 12, 1950, for the Washington Senators

Last MLB appearance
- September 27, 1952, for the Washington Senators

MLB statistics
- Batting average: .191
- Home runs: 0
- Runs batted in: 4
- Stats at Baseball Reference

Teams
- Washington Senators (1950–52)

After graduating, Taylor signed as an amateur free agent with the baseball Washington Senators on June 6, 1950. Primarily a first baseman, he was assigned to the minor league Chattanooga Lookouts, where he batted .263 in 78 games. He made his major league debut on September 12, and played six games for the Senators.

Taylor returned to Chattanooga in 1951, this time batting .291 in 152 games. He again earned a brief trial with the Senators, appearing in six more games. In 1952, he managed to play in ten games while again spending most of the season in the minors. After playing one more season with the independent Beaumont Exporters of the Texas League in 1953, he left baseball for good.

== Coaching career ==
After the end of his baseball career, Taylor returned to Ohio State as assistant basketball coach in 1958, becoming head coach the following year.

During his 18 years at Ohio State, the Buckeyes won the 1960 NCAA championship, were runners-up in 1961 and 1962 to Cincinnati (as coached by Ed Jucker) and claimed a third-place finish in 1968. When Taylor made his third straight Final Four in 1962, he was only the third coach ever to reach three consecutive Final Fours after Phil Woolpert and Harold Olsen. His Final Four appearance in 1968 made him the sixth coach to reach that mark. The last time he coached the Buckeyes to an NCAA tournament appearance was in 1971, where Ohio State upset previously unbeaten Marquette in the Mideast Regional semifinal round. However, Western Kentucky beat OSU in the Mideast Regional round to advance to the Final Four. In his five NCAA tournament appearances, Taylor's teams went 14–4 and also won or shared seven Big Ten titles. In a three-year span (1960–62), his teams won 68 games in the regular season with four losses while going 10–2 in the NCAA Tournament. At one point in Taylor's tenure with the Buckeyes, the team won 32 straight games, and they once had a home winning streak of fifty games.

Taylor finished his career with an overall record of 297–158 and was named Coach of the Year by the USBWA and UPI in 1961 and 1962. A talented recruiter, Taylor coached six All-Americans as well as Hall of Famers Jerry Lucas, John Havlicek and Bobby Knight.

Taylor served as president of the National Association of Basketball Coaches in 1972 and was a member of the U.S. Olympic Basketball Committee from 1964 to 1972. He also served on the University Division of the NCAA Tournament Selection Committee for a number of years.

== Retirement ==
After retiring from coaching in 1976, Taylor managed the U.S. National Team in the 1978 FIBA World Championships and the 1979 Pan American Games. In addition, Taylor managed The Golf Club, a private golf course in New Albany, Ohio, for 18 years.

In addition, Taylor was a television analyst for college basketball on NBC, often paired with Merle Harmon, during the late 1970s and early 1980s. As players found themselves in precarious situations, Taylor often described them as, "between a rock and a hard place."

On May 6, 1986, Taylor was enshrined in the Basketball Hall of Fame, having previously been selected to the Ohio State Hall of Fame. He was inducted into the Ohio Basketball Hall of Fame as part of the Charter Class of 2006.

== Head coaching record ==
Record table
Season	Team	Overall	Conference	Standing	Postseason
Ohio State Buckeyes (Big Ten Conference) (1958–1976)
1958–59	Ohio State	11–11	7–7	T–5th	
1959–60	Ohio State	25–3	13–1	1st	NCAA University Division Champion
1960–61	Ohio State	27–1	14–0	1st	NCAA University Division Runner-up
1961–62	Ohio State	26–2	13–1	1st	NCAA University Division Runner-up
1962–63	Ohio State	20–4	11–3	T–1st	
1963–64	Ohio State	16–8	11–3	T–1st	
1964–65	Ohio State	12–12	6–8	6th	
1965–66	Ohio State	11–13	5–9	8th	
1966–67	Ohio State	13–11	6–8	T–7th	
1967–68	Ohio State	21–8	10–4	T–1st	NCAA University Division Final Four
1968–69	Ohio State	17–7	9–5	T–2nd	
1969–70	Ohio State	17–7	8–6	T–3rd	
1970–71	Ohio State	20–6	13–1	1st	NCAA University Division Elite Eight
1971–72	Ohio State	18–6	10–4	2nd	
1972–73	Ohio State	14–10	8–6	T–3rd	
1973–74	Ohio State	9–15	4–10	8th	
1974–75	Ohio State	14–14	8–10	6th	
1975–76	Ohio State	6–20	2–16	10th	
Ohio State:		297–158	158–102		
Total:		297–158			
National champion Postseason invitational champion Conference regular season champion Conference regular season and conference tournament champion Division regular season champion Division regular season and conference tournament champion Conference tournament champion

== See also ==
- List of NCAA Division I Men's Final Four appearances by coach
