= 1960–61 Drexel Dragons men's basketball team =

American college basketball season

1960–61 Drexel Dragons men's basketball

MAC College–Southern Regular Season Champions
- Conference: Middle Atlantic Conferences
- College–Southern
- Record: 12–5 (11–2 MAC)
- Head coach: Samuel Cozen (9th season)
- Home arena: Sayre High School

1960–61 MAC men's basketball standings
	Conf.				Overall
Team	W		L	PCT	W		L	PCT
University
Saint Joseph's*	8	–	0	1.000	25	–	5	.833**
Temple	9	–	1	.900	20	–	8	.714
La Salle	7	–	2	.778	15	–	7	.682
Gettysburg	8	–	4	.667	19	–	6	.760
Lafayette	6	–	6	.500	16	–	8	.667
Bucknell	5	–	6	.455	12	–	11	.522
Rutgers	3	–	6	.333	11	–	10	.524
Lehigh	4	–	10	.286	5	–	16	.238
Delaware	2	–	7	.222	8	–	11	.421
Muhlenberg	2	–	12	.143	5	–	20	.200
College–Northern
Albright †	12	–	1	.923	19	–	9	.679
No. 6 Hofstra	10	–	1	.909	21	–	4	.840
Susquehanna	9	–	4	.692	17	–	6	.739
Moravian	11	–	5	.688	13	–	7	.650
Elizabethtown	7	–	7	.500	11	–	11	.500
Lebanon Valley	8	–	8	.500	10	–	9	.526
Wagner	5	–	5	.500	9	–	15	.375
Lycoming	6	–	8	.429	9	–	13	.409
Scranton	4	–	8	.333	5	–	18	.217
Wilkes	4	–	11	.267	7	–	15	.318
Upsala	2	–	9	.182		–		–
Juniata	1	–	10	.091	1	–	17	.056
Stevens***	0	–	3	.000		–		–
College–Southern
Drexel	11	–	2	.846	12	–	5	.706
Western Maryland	8	–	2	.800	16	–	7	.696
Haverford	8	–	4	.667	12	–	5	.706
Dickinson	9	–	5	.643		–		–
Franklin & Marshall	6	–	7	.462	8	–	11	.421
Pennsylvania Military	5	–	10	.333		–		–
Ursinus	4	–	9	.308	6	–	11	.353
Swarthmore	3	–	10	.231	3	–	13	.188
Johns Hopkins	1	–	9	.100	4	–	16	.200
Washington (MD)***	4	–	4	.500		–		–
West Chester***	3	–	3	.500		–		–
† 1961 MAC College Division men's basketball tournament winner * – Regular-season University Division champion ** – Overall record later adjuted to 22–4 (.846) *** – Ineligible for championship

The 1960–61 Drexel Dragons men's basketball team represented Drexel Institute of Technology during the 1960–61 men's basketball season. The Dragons, led by 9th year head coach Samuel Cozen, played their home games at Sayre High School and were members of the College–Southern division of the Middle Atlantic Conferences (MAC).

The team finished the season 12–5, and finished in 1st place in the MAC in the regular season.

Due to a power outage in Collegeville, Pennsylvania, the last 5 minutes and 10 seconds of Drexel's game at Ursinus on February 25, 1961, was not played.

On February 8, 1961, Samuel Cozen recorded his 100th win as Drexel head coach.

== Roster ==
1960–61 Drexel Dragons men's basketball team
Players	Coaches
Pos. / # / Name / Height / Weight / Year / Previous school / Hometown; / / / — / —	Head coach: Samuel Cozen (Temple); Assistant coach(es) Legend: (C) Team captain; (S) Suspended; (I) Ineligible; (W) Walk-on; Injured; Current redshirt

== Schedule ==
Date time, TV	Rank^{#}	Opponent^{#}	Result	Record	High points	High rebounds	High assists	Site (attendance) city, state
Regular season
January 7, 1961		Pennsylvania Military College	W –	1–0 (1–0)	–	–	–	Sayre High School; Philadelphia, Pennsylvania
January 9, 1961		at Elizabethtown	L 51–61	1–1 (1–1)	–	–	–	
January 11, 1961		at Haverford	W 57–54	2–1 (2–1)	27 – Morgan	14 – Heffner	–	Ryan Gym; Haverford, Pennsylvania
January 14, 1961; 3:30 pm		Ursinus	W 67–56	3–1 (3–1)	–	–	–	Sayre High School; Philadelphia, Pennsylvania
January 18, 1961*; 8:30 pm		Delaware	W 69–63	4–1	–	16 – Henry	–	Sayre High School (250); Philadelphia, Pennsylvania
January 21, 1961; 3:30 pm		Washington (Maryland)	Cancelled (Snow)					Sayre High School; Philadelphia, Pennsylvania
Unknown		West Chester	W 70–57	5–1 (4–1)	20 – Morgan	11 – Heffner	–	
January 28, 1961*; 6:45 pm		at Pratt	L 59–73	5–2	18 – Morgan	–	–	Brooklyn, New York
February 4, 1961; 3:30 pm		at Franklin & Marshall	Cancelled (Snow)					Lancaster, Pennsylvania
February 8, 1961; 8:30 pm		at Swarthmore	W 64–52	6–2 (5–1)	19 – Brown	–	–	
February 11, 1961; 8:30 pm		at Pennsylvania Military College	W 80–70	7–2 (6–1)	25 – Morgan	–	–	Chester, Pennsylvania
February 13, 1961; 8:45 pm		at Johns Hopkins	W 84–58	8–2 (7–1)	–	–	–	
February 15, 1961; 8:30 pm		Haverford	W 79–65	9–2 (8–1)	–	–	–	Sayre High School; Philadelphia, Pennsylvania
February 18, 1961; 2:00 pm		Wagner	W 78–70	10–2 (9–1)	21 – Brown	–	–	Sayre High School; Philadelphia, Pennsylvania
February 21, 1961; 8:15 pm		at Lebanon Valley	L 49–53	10–3 (9–2)	–	–	–	
February 22, 1961; 8:30 pm		at Wilkes	W 73–63	11–3 (10–2)	20 – Morgan	–	–	
February 25, 1961		at Ursinus	W 67–50	12–3 (11–2)	15 – Hilmer	–	–	Collegeville, Pennsylvania
1961 Middle Atlantic Conference men's basketball tournament
March 3, 1961; 9:00 pm	(2)	vs. (3) No. 6 Hofstra; Semifinals	L 55–77	12–4	26 – Morgan	–	–	Muhlenberg Fieldhouse; Allentown, Pennsylvania
March 4, 1961; 7:00 pm	(2)	vs. (4) Haverford; Third Place Game	L 61–72	12–5	–	–	–	Muhlenberg Fieldhouse; Allentown, Pennsylvania
*Non-conference game. ^{#}Rankings from AP. (#) Tournament seedings in parentheses. All times are in Eastern Time.
