= Harvey Pate =

American basketball player and coach (1918–2010)

Biographical details
- Born: November 15, 1918; Byars, Oklahoma, U.S.
- Died: October 2, 2010 (aged 91); Seneca, Missouri, U.S.

Playing career
- 1938–1941: Oklahoma A&M
- Position: Guard

Coaching career (HC unless noted)
- 1947–1956: Cameron College
- 1956–1980: Houston (assistant)

Administrative career (AD unless noted)
- 1947–1956: Cameron College

Head coaching record
- Overall: 165–56 (.747)

Harvey Ray Pate (November 15, 1918 — October 2, 2010) was an American basketball player and coach. He was the main assistant to Guy Lewis at the University of Houston from 1956 to 1980 and was instrumental in helping build the program into a national power, as well as helping recruit the program's first African-American players in Elvin Hayes and Don Chaney.

Born in Byars, Oklahoma, Pate played for Henry Iba at Oklahoma A&M (now Oklahoma State) from 1938 to 1941 before becoming the head coach and athletic director at Cameron College, where he compiled a 165–56 record from 1947 to 1956.
