= Ed Jucker =

American basketball and baseball player and coach

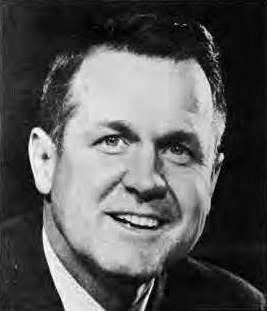
- Jucker circa 1963

Biographical details
- Born: July 8, 1916; Norwood, Ohio, U.S.
- Died: February 2, 2002 (aged 85); Callawassie Island, South Carolina, U.S.

Playing career

Basketball
- 1937–1940: Cincinnati

Coaching career (HC unless noted)

Basketball
- 1945–1948: Merchant Marine
- 1948–1953: RPI
- 1953–1960: Cincinnati (assistant)
- 1960–1965: Cincinnati
- 1967–1969: Cincinnati Royals
- 1972–1977: Rollins

Baseball
- 1954–1960: Cincinnati

Administrative career (AD unless noted)
- 1981–1983: Rollins

Head coaching record
- Overall: 270–122 (college basketball); 87–38 (college baseball); 80–84 (NBA)
- Tournaments: Basketball; 11–1 (NCAA University Division); 1–3 (NCAA Division II)

Accomplishments and honors

Championships
- Basketball; 2 NCAA University Division Tournament (1961, 1962); 3 NCAA Division I Regional—Final Four (1961, 1962, 1963); 3 MVC (1961–1963)

Awards
- Henry Iba Award (1963); NABC Coach of the Year (1963); UPI College Basketball Coach of the Year (1963); 2× MVC Coach of the Year (1961, 1963)

Edwin Louis Jucker (July 8, 1916 – February 2, 2002) was an American basketball and baseball coach and college athletics administrator. He served as the head basketball coach at the United States Merchant Marine Academy from 1945 to 1948, Rensselaer Polytechnic Institute (RPI) from 1948 to 1953, the University of Cincinnati from 1960 to 1965, and Rollins College from 1972 to 1977, compiling a career college basketball coaching record of 270–122. He led the Cincinnati Bearcats men's basketball program to consecutive national titles, winning the NCAA basketball tournament in 1961 and 1962. Jucker was also the head coach of the Cincinnati Bearcats baseball team from 1954 to 1960 while serving as an assistant coach for the basketball team. He spent two seasons coaching in the professional ranks, leading the Cincinnati Royals of the National Basketball Association (NBA) from 1967 to 1969. Jucker served as the athletic director at Rollins College from 1981 to 1983.

== Early life ==
Jucker was born in Norwood, Ohio. He attended the University of Cincinnati as an undergraduate student and played on the school's basketball teams during the 1938, 1939, and 1940 seasons. He was the captain of the 1940 team. Also, while an undergraduate, Jucker became a member of the Alpha Tau Omega fraternity.

== Early coaching ==
Jucker was a professional baseball prospect until he decided to start coaching instead of trying to make it into Major League Baseball. His coaching career began at Batavia High in Clermont County, Ohio, east of Cincinnati. Following service in the Navy during World War II, he joined the college coaching ranks as assistant basketball coach at the United States Merchant Marine Academy in 1946. Two years later, he became head basketball coach at Rensselaer Polytechnic Institute.

Jucker returned to the University of Cincinnati in 1953 as assistant basketball coach and baseball mentor. He directed the UC freshmen to a 67–21 record in six years, while his baseball teams were 87–38 over seven seasons. In 1954, Jucker recruited Sandy Koufax at Cincinnati. After watching Koufax in his first practice, Jucker got him a work-study scholarship.

== Coaching career ==
In 1960, Jucker was promoted to coach the basketball team after George Smith had accepted an offer become the program's athletic director. The 1960–61 season would be the first without star point guard Oscar Robertson, who had been drafted into the NBA; in his three seasons with Cincinnati, the Bearcats had gone 79–9 and went to the Final Four twice. With a roster of fairly talented players that had used a run-and-shoot offense designed by Smith to get the ball to Robertson, Jucker instituted a new system he called "percentage basketball", one that would gear offense and defense to the method of play that seemed to have the best chance of success. The system did not come easily to success at first, as Cincinnati lost three of their first eight games. A 72–53 blowout loss to Bradley was the last loss in the 1960 season, which saw him abandon the 2-3 zone defense for man-to-man defense while garnering the respect of players such as Paul Hogue, who stated that they were behind him and his system. In the 1961 NCAA University Division basketball tournament, they reached their first ever tournament final after having lost in the Final Four back-to-back years. They met Ohio State, who had a roster of Jerry Lucas, John Havlicek, Larry Siegfried to go with Henry Iba Award winner Fred Taylor as the defending champions. They trailed Ohio State 39–38 at halftime but rallied behind defense that rattled Lucas and Havlicek to end the second half with a 61–61 tie. Cincinnati played slow control in overtime to win 70–65 for the program's first national championship. In the 1962 NCAA University Division basketball tournament, they met Ohio State again in the National Championship, with only UCLA playing them close (a 72–70 win). They beat Ohio State (hindered by injury to Lucas) 71–59 to clinch back-to-back NCAA basketball tournament championships. Jucker later stated his pride of his team and the dynasty (one that he had said was forgotten by fans) they had created for themselves.

For all of his winning, he was once described as one who "usually has the harried mien of a longtime loser", regardless of the winning; Cincinnati lost just six times in Jucker's first three seasons. His 1963 team lost only one regular season game before reaching the championship game of the NCAA tournament versus Loyola of Chicago (who had All-American Jerry Harkness), one of the first teams to have a majority of African Americans in their playing lineup. Seven of the 10 starters in the game were African-American, the first time that a majority of players in the NCAA title game were black. The Bearcats led 29–21 at halftime, but Harkness tied the game at 54–54 to close the second half and force overtime. A tight overtime ended with Loyola's Vic Rouse tipping in a shot to give Loyola a 60–58 victory that closed the Cincinnati dynasty. The following year saw the team go 17–9 and finished tied for third place in the conference and shut out of the tournament. The fifth and final season for Jucker saw them lose twelve games.

Jucker left the program after the 1965 season, citing the effects the job had on his family. Jucker holds the record for the highest winning percentage (.917) in NCAA tournament play. In his five seasons coaching the Bearcats, Jucker's team posted a record of 113–28, a .801 winning percentage. In 1966 he remained at the university as the Intramural Director and spent the summer in Spain coaching their national team. He agreed to coach the Spain national team from 1967 but changed his mind when he received offers from the National Basketball Association with Cincinnati Royals and the American Basketball Association with the Indiana Pacers. In 1967, he chose to become the head coach of the Cincinnati Royals of the National Basketball Association, which had both Robertson and Lucas on the roster. Robertson played in a career-low 65 games due to hamstring problems but still led the league in scoring with 29.2 points per game. The Royals (who also saw injury happen to Lucas on his knee) finished 39–43, one game out of a playoff spot. The 1968–69 season had them start at 20–9, but the turn of the year saw them fade away to a 41–41 finish. Jucker was let go after the season ended. Jucker then went to Rollins College in Winter Park, Florida where he built the school's basketball program into a national contender in NCAA Division II.

In 1978, he was inducted into the University of Cincinnati Athletics Hall of Fame. Also, the court that the University of Cincinnati plays on is named after Jucker. The number he wore as Cincinnati baseball coach is one of only two numbers retired by the school's baseball team.

== Personal life and legacy ==
Jucker died of prostate cancer on Callawassie Island, South Carolina in 2002 at age 85. He was survived by his wife, Joanne.

Cincinnati honored Jucker by inducting him into their athletics Hall of Fame in 1977. Rollins inducted him into their Hall of Fame in 1982.

In 2014, he was inducted into the Ohio Basketball Hall of Fame. He is the only non-active coach with multiple NCAA Division I championships to not be a member of either the National Collegiate Basketball Hall of Fame or the Naismith Memorial Basketball Hall of Fame.

== Head coaching record ==
=== NBA ===
Legend
| Regular season | G | Games coached | W | Games won | L | Games lost | W–L % | Win–loss % |
| Playoffs | PG | Playoff games | PW | Playoff wins | PL | Playoff losses | PW–L % | Playoff win–loss % |

| Team | Year | G | W | L | W–L% | Finish | PG | PW | PL | PW–L% | Result |
|---|---|---|---|---|---|---|---|---|---|---|---|
| Cincinnati | 1967–68 | 82 | 39 | 43 | .476 | 5th in Eastern | — | — | — | — | Missed Playoffs |
| Cincinnati | 1968–69 | 82 | 41 | 41 | .500 | 5th in Eastern | — | — | — | — | Missed Playoffs |
| Career | | 164 | 80 | 84 | .488 | | — | — | — | — | |

=== College basketball ===
Record table
| Season | Team | Overall | Conference | Standing | Postseason |
|---|---|---|---|---|---|
Merchant Marine Mariners (Independent) (1945–1948)
| 1945–46 | Merchant Marine | 14–0 | | | |
| 1946–47 | Merchant Marine | 12–4 | | | |
| 1947–48 | Merchant Marine | 4–13 | | | |
| Merchant Marine: | | 30–17 | | | |
RPI Engineers (Independent) (1948–1953)
| 1948–49 | RPI | 13–3 | | | |
| 1949–50 | RPI | 12–3 | | | |
| 1950–51 | RPI | 9–9 | | | |
| 1951–52 | RPI | 4–11 | | | |
| 1952–53 | RPI | 8–9 | | | |
| RPI: | | 46–35 | | | |
Cincinnati Bearcats (Missouri Valley Conference) (1960–1965)
| 1960–61 | Cincinnati | 27–2 | 10–2 | 1st | NCAA University Division Champion |
| 1961–62 | Cincinnati | 29–2 | 10–2 | 1st | NCAA University Division Champion |
| 1962–63 | Cincinnati | 26–2 | 11–1 | 1st | NCAA University Division Runner-up |
| 1963–64 | Cincinnati | 17–9 | 6–6 | T–3rd | |
| 1964–65 | Cincinnati | 14–12 | 5–9 | 7th | |
| Cincinnati: | | 113–28 | 42–20 | | |
Rollins Tars (Independent) (1972–1975)
| 1972–73 | Rollins | 13–11 | | | |
| 1973–74 | Rollins | 18–9 | | | NCAA Division II Regional Fourth Place |
| 1974–75 | Rollins | 15–7 | | | |
Rollins Tars (Sunshine State Conference) (1975–1977)
| 1975–76 | Rollins | 19–6 | | | NCAA Division II Regional Third Place |
| 1976–77 | Rollins | 16–9 | | | |
| Rollins: | | 81–42 | | | |
| Total: | | 270–122 | | | |
National champion Postseason invitational champion Conference regular season champion Conference regular season and conference tournament champion Division regular season champion Division regular season and conference tournament champion Conference tournament champion

== See also ==
- List of NCAA Division I Men's Final Four appearances by coach
