= Bruce Larson (basketball) =

American basketball coach (1926–2021)

Biographical details
- Born: August 12, 1926; Fargo, North Dakota, U.S.
- Died: April 13, 2021 (aged 94); Tucson, Arizona, U.S.

Playing career
- 1948–1950: Arizona

Coaching career (HC unless noted)
- 1951–1957: Eastern Arizona (assistant)
- 1957–1959: Weber
- 1959–1961: Arizona (assistant)
- 1961–1972: Arizona

Accomplishments and honors

Championships
- Junior college national (1959)

Bruce Alan Larson (August 12, 1926 – April 13, 2021) was an American basketball coach. He was coach of the Arizona Wildcats from 1961 to 1972. Prior to his time at Arizona, Larson served as coach at Eastern Arizona and Weber College (now Weber State). At Weber, his team won the 1959 Junior college national championship.
