= 1960–61 Princeton Tigers men's basketball team =

American college basketball season

1960–61 Princeton Tigers men's basketball
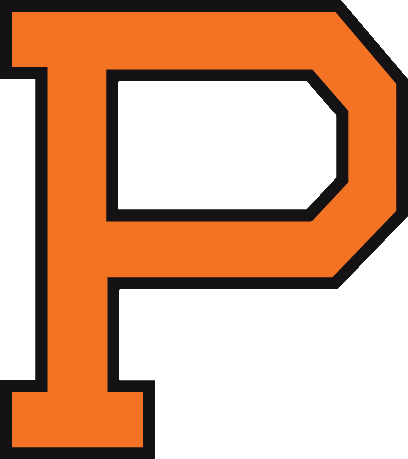

Ivy League champion

1961 NCAA Division I men's basketball tournament, Regional 4th place
- Conference: Ivy League
- Record: 18–8 (11–3 Ivy)
- Head coach: Franklin Cappon; Jake McCandless
- Captain: Donald Swan
- Home arena: Dillon Gymnasium

The 1960–61 Princeton Tigers men's basketball team represented Princeton University in intercollegiate college basketball during the 1959–60 NCAA University Division men's basketball season. Franklin Cappon began the season as head coach. In January 1961, Cappon suffered a mild heart attack, and Jake McCandless took over his role as head coach following Cappon's hospitalization. The team captain was Donald Swan. The team posted a 9–2 record under Cappon and then a 9–6 record with McCandless at the helm. The team played its home games in the Dillon Gymnasium in Princeton, New Jersey. The team was the champion of the Ivy League, earning an invitation to the 24-team 1961 NCAA Division I men's basketball tournament.

After losing its first game under McCandless, the team won six of the next seven. The team posted an 18-8 overall record and an 11-3 conference record. The team won its NCAA Division I men's basketball tournament East region first round contest against the George Washington Colonials by an 84–67 margin at Madison Square Garden on March 14, 1961, before losing in the second round at the Charlotte Coliseum in the second round to the Saint Joseph's Hawks 72–67 on March 17. Then, the next night at the Coliseum in the consolation game, they lost to the St. Bonaventure Bonnies 85–67.

Peter C. Campbell, who finished second in the conference to Dartmouth's George Ramming in scoring title with an 18.1 points per game average in conference games, and Al Kaemmerlen were both first team All-Ivy League selections.
