= Ken Bahnsen Gym =

Arena in Denton, Texas

- The Snake Pit
- Former names: Men's Gymnasium
- Location: Denton, Texas, USA
- Owner: University of North Texas
- Operator: University of North Texas
- Capacity: 5,000

Construction
- Opened: 1950

Tenant
- North Texas MBB (1950-1973)

Ken Bahnsen Gym, formerly known as the Men's Gymnasium, is a 5,000-seat multi-purpose arena on the campus of the University of North Texas in Denton, Texas, United States. The Men's Gymnasium was home court for the North Texas Mean Green men's basketball team since the arena opened in 1950 until moving to the Super Pit in 1973.

== "The Snake Pit" ==
The intimate 5,000-seat arena, with its low-hanging ceiling and bleachers right up against the playing surface, was known throughout college basketball as one of the toughest places for opposing teams to visit throughout the 1950s and 1960s, especially during Missouri Valley Conference games. The first row of seats were located just two feet from the out-of-bounds and baselines, leaving very little room between fans and the action.

While formally known as the Men's Gymnasium for most of its time as the home of the Mean Green, former Drake University head coach Maury John, fed up with the raucous crowd noise following a loss at the Bahnsen Gym, inadvertently gave the facility its nickname in the postgame press conference: "This is the worst damn place in the world to play basketball. It's like trying to play in a snake pit." The name stuck, and when the new 10,000-seat arena opened across the street in 1973, university officials gave the larger venue the Super Pit name in honor of the Snake Pit.
