= Arthur Raymond Halbritter =

American-Indian representative and businessman

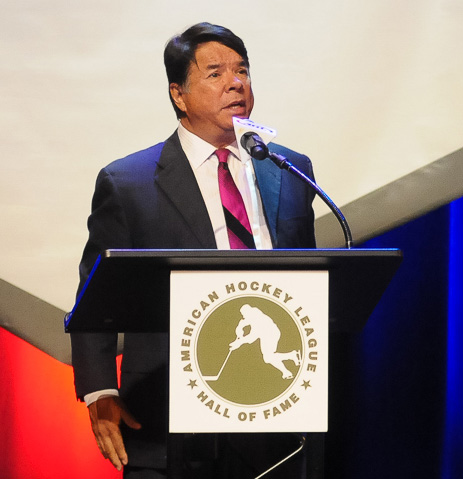
Halbritter in 2015

Arthur Raymond (Ray) Halbritter (born July 17, 1951) is an American businessman who is the current Nation Representative and CEO of Oneida Nation Enterprises, a major casino and tobacco conglomerate in Upstate New York. He is a member of the Oneida Indian Nation's Wolf Clan.

== Biography ==
Ray Halbritter, Nation Representative of the Oneida Indian Nation Inc. since 1975 and chief executive officer (CEO) of its enterprises since 1990, has led the Oneida people to an economic and cultural renaissance during the past 30 years. His accomplishments include achieving federal government recognition of the Nation's traditional form of government, creating numerous health and social programs for Nation Members, constructing new housing, and establishing education and culture programs. Halbritter earned his Bachelor of Science in business administration from Syracuse University and his Juris Doctor from Harvard Law School.

An avid golfer, Halbritter passed the Players Ability Test, making him a golf pro apprentice, the first stage to become a member of the Professional Golfers Association.

Halbritter is the grandson of Mary Cornelius Winder.

== Oneida Indian Nation ==
Under Halbritter's leadership, the Oneida Indian Nation endowed a professorship at Harvard Law School for teaching American Indian law, sponsored the “True Spirit of Thanksgiving,” the first-ever American Indian-sponsored float in the annual Macy's Thanksgiving Day Parade, and earned the 2007 Condé Nast Johansens “Most Excellent Resort” award for all resorts in the U.S. and Canada. As one of the donors to the Smithsonian Institution’s National Museum of the American Indian, the Oneida Indian Nation of New York had the fourth floor named in its honor. The Oneida Nation also hosts the PGA TOUR Turning Stone Resort Championship, the first regularly scheduled green PGA TOUR event to be held on tribal lands, which was honored for Best Branding and Signage in 2009.

The Oneida Nation's businesses include Turning Stone Resort Casino in Verona, New York, Yellow Brick Road Casino in Chittenango, New York, Point Place Casino in Bridgeport, New York, the SavOn chain of convenience stores, a media operation that encompasses Indian Country Today Media Network, the largest native national weekly newspaper in the U.S., and a media production company.

Halbritter is executive producer of a Grammy-nominated record album, Raccoon & Crawfish, and a 3-D animated exert short film, the animation of which won a Silver Davey Award, given to the best work by small firms worldwide. It was screened at Cannes Film Festival, as well as winning numerous awards in the U.S. and abroad, including top animation honors at Moondance Film Festival and Big Bear International Film Festival. Halbritter produced the World of American Indian Dance, which aired on NBC, in addition to interactive animated material on Oneida history that is used at the Utica Children's Museum. He assisted Disney with native music background for the Walt Disney World July 4 Celebration.

Through its enterprises, the Nation has earned national and international recognition and honors, including Four Diamond ratings from AAA for the resort's luxury hotels and one of its restaurants. It was named as the Academy of Country Music’s Casino of the Year. All three of Turning Stone’s championship-caliber golf courses were listed in Golfweek magazine’s list of Top 100 courses in the country, in addition to receiving multiple other golf awards. (A full list of golf awards is attached.) The Nation’s Atunyote Golf Course hosts both the Turning Stone Resort Championship and the annual Notah Begay III Foundation Challenge charity event, which Tiger Woods won in 2009.

== Service ==
Halbritter is chairman of the Turning Stone Resort Championship and the Upstate New York Empowerment Fund, the charitable arm of the tournament, which has raised hundreds of thousands of dollars for dozens of Central New York charities and civic groups. He serves on the boards of directors of the Environmental Media Association and the Harvard Native American Law Board. He is a member of the Recording Academy; the National Advisory Council for the American Indian Program at Cornell University; the National Congress of American Indians; and United South and Eastern Tribes. Halbritter is a board member of the Academy Museum of Motion Pictures.

== Recognition ==
Halbritter was named one of Temple Adath Yeshurun’s Citizens of the Year in 2008. He also won the “Person of Achievement” Award from The Post-Standard (Syracuse), the Paul Harris Fellow Award from the Rotary Foundation, an award from the Rome Area Chamber of Commerce for “Outstanding Contribution to the Economic Vitality of the Community,” and the Central New York Sales & Marketing Executives Crystal Ball award, presented for business vision, commitment to improving the lives of his people, and the Nation's economic contributions to Central New York. Syracuse University gave him its Distinguished Entrepreneur Award, and SU Basketball Coach Jim Boeheim presented Halbritter with the Coaches Vs. Cancer Basketball Award and honored him as Fan of the Year in 2009.

== Washington Redskins Protest ==
Halbritter has been leading a vocal protest against the name of the NFL Washington Redskins team, calling it racially insensitive. On January 31, 2014, he met with the Assistant Secretary-General for Human Rights at U.N. headquarters in Manhattan While his protests fell on deaf ears, the Washington Redskins finally gave up the name after Nike pulled all of its team merchandise and FedEx threatened to pull its financial backing of FedEx Stadium. On July 13, 2020, the Washington Redskins team announced its decision to retire the team logo and change its name.

== Criticism ==
Critics inside the tribe have accused Halbritter of being a dictator, a heavy-handed leader who "answers to no one," according to Doug George-Kanentiio, the co-founder of the Native American Journalists Association. Halbritter's initiatives have been criticized by some Oneida, who say he has violated the Great Law of the Haudenosaunee by embracing gambling. They also fault him for selecting his own clan mothers and for creating a "men's council," both unheard-of practices in Haudenosaunee tradition.

== See also ==
- Turning Stone Resort & Casino
