= Joe Mesi =

American boxer

Personal information
- Nickname: Baby Joe
- Born: Joe Mesi; November 27, 1973 (age 52) Tonawanda, New York, United States
- Weight: Heavyweight

Boxing career
- Stance: Orthodox

Boxing record
- Total fights: 36
- Wins: 36
- Win by KO: 29
- Losses: 0
- Draws: 0
- No contests: 0

"Baby" Joe Mesi (born November 27, 1973) is an American former professional boxer and Democratic Party politician from Tonawanda, New York.

During his career, he defeated former world champion Vassily Jirov as well as former title challengers Bert Cooper, Monte Barrett, DaVarryl Williamson, and Jorge Luis González.

== Early life ==
Joe grew up in Tonawanda, New York, a suburb of Buffalo. He attended Sweet Home High School in Amherst, New York. He did not start his boxing career until he was about 19 years of age.

== Boxing career ==
He was a New York State Golden Gloves champion, and as an amateur boxer he defeated future two-time heavyweight champion Hasim Rahman. Mesi made it all the way to the finals in the 1996 Olympic Trials, but lost to eventual US heavyweight representative Lawrence Clay-Bey. In Buffalo, for a brief period, Joe was once considered by some to be the city's "third professional franchise", with the Buffalo Sabres and Buffalo Bills being the other two. Joe is still often seen at Bills and Sabres games and also supports many local charities.

=== Philanthropy ===
In 2002, Mesi started a non-profit to raise awareness about organ donation and transplantation upon finding out his cousin was in need of a kidney transplant, and to help others in the Upstate New York area who needed such surgeries. His cousin, Ganelle Shanor, died in an accident before she was able to receive the operation. In January 2004, Mesi donated $7,500 to the Golisano Children's Hospital in Rochester, New York as a way of giving back to the Rochester community and to promote an upcoming fight at the Blue Cross Arena, with kidney transplant recipient Dillon Gonzalez and his family in attendance. The foundation was funded in part by admission fees to victory parties.

=== Injury and suspension ===
Mesi's promising boxing career was set back greatly when an MRI indicated he had suffered at least one, perhaps two subdural hematomas.

The injuries came from a 2004 bout with former cruiserweight champion Vassiliy Jirov. In round 9, Mesi was knocked down from a right hook and in the tenth round he was knocked down two more times. Mesi managed to finish the fight on his feet and the bout was scored 94–93 for Mesi by all three judges.

In June 2005, Mesi, along with his attorneys and three doctors supporting his reinstatement, went before the Nevada State Athletic Commission to argue Mesi's hematomas had healed, and, he was, "in no more danger than any other boxer." Mesi's appeal was denied by a 5–0 vote. In response to Dr. Julian E. Bailes, chairman of the department of neurosurgery at the West Virginia University School of Medicine, opinion that: "Football players and other athletes who had even more severe head injuries than Mesi were allowed to continue their careers without further harmful effects." Dr. Tony Alamo, one of the board's commissioners, replied, "You play football, you don't play boxing."

The suspension effectively blacklisted him from boxing anywhere in the United States under the premise of the Full Faith and Credit Clause. He launched several ineffective lawsuits against parties they claimed had leaked news of his health, while also appealing to Nevada representatives that he should be allowed to box. The suspension was officially lifted when Mesi's Nevada boxing license expired at the end of 2005. However, he was unable to renew the license due to the concerns of Nevada boxing officials. In 2006, Mesi was again licensed by boxing commissions in Puerto Rico, Louisiana, Arkansas and Michigan, with a handful of other states to follow suit in 2007. Over that time, Mesi won all of his handful of fights, though effectively retired from boxing in 2007.

Joe Mesi had one of the longest active undefeated professional boxing records in the world for a heavyweight. Ranked #1 heavyweight contender by the WBC prior to his two-year layoff, Mesi was #16 in the December 2007 rankings. In 2018, Mesi was inducted into the Greater Buffalo Sports Hall of Fame and the New York State Boxing Hall of Fame.

== Politics and life after boxing ==
On February 14, 2008, Mesi publicly expressed his interest to run for the New York State Senate. He attempted to fill the 61st District seat vacated by Mary Lou Rath. He won the Democratic primary for the seat on September 9, 2008. Mesi lost the general election to Republican Michael Ranzenhofer.

Most recently, Joe has taken a position with the Democratic Senate Majority heading up a local Buffalo liaison office. Mesi's name was circulated as a potential Democratic candidate to replace the retiring Jim Hayes in the New York State Assembly. The assembly seat was won by Raymond Walter.

Professionally, Mesi was a medical supply salesman with Abbott Medical, although is no longer with this company. Mesi and his wife, Michele, have three children.

== Professional boxing record ==
36 fights	36 wins	0 losses
By knockout	29	0
By decision	7	0

Result	Record	Opponent	Type	Round	Date	Location	Notes
Win	36–0	(United States) Shannon Miller	TKO	1 (10)	12/10/2007	(United States) Twin River Event Center, Lincoln, Rhode Island	Won vacant WBC USNBC Heavyweight title.
Win	35–0	(United States) Ron Johnson	KO	1 (10)	14/04/2007	(United States) The Hughes Center, Russellville, Arkansas	
Win	34–0	(United States) George Linberger	TKO	1 (10)	22/02/2007	(United States) Mountaineer Casino, Racetrack & Resort, Chester, West Virginia	
Win	33–0	(United States) Jason Weiss	UD	4	15/09/2006	(United States) Little River Casino, Manistee, Michigan	
Win	32–0	(United States) Dennis Matthews	TKO	2 (4)	12/08/2006	(United States) Pope County Fairgrounds, Russellville, Arkansas	
Win	31–0	(Canada) Stephane Tessier	UD	6	23/06/2006	Uniprix Stadium, Montreal, Canada	
Win	30–0	(United States) Ron Bellamy	UD	8	01/04/2006	Coliseo Mario 'Quijote' Morales, Guaynabo, Puerto Rico	
Win	29–0	(Kazakhstan) Vassiliy Jirov	UD	10	Mar 13, 2004	(United States) Mandalay Bay Resort & Casino, Las Vegas	
Win	28–0	(United States) Monte Barrett	MD	10	06/12/2003	(United States) Madison Square Garden, New York	
Win	27–0	(United States) DaVarryl Williamson	KO	1 (10)	27/09/2003	(United States) HSBC Arena, Buffalo, New York	
Win	26–0	(United States) Robert Davis	TKO	1 (12)	24/06/2003	(United States) HSBC Arena, Buffalo, New York	Won vacant NABF heavyweight title.
Win	25–0	(United States) Jason Curry	KO	2 (10)	28/03/2003	(United States) Creek Nation Gaming Center, Tulsa, Oklahoma	
Win	24–0	(Nigeria) David Izon	KO	9 (10)	18/10/2002	(United States) HSBC Arena, Buffalo, New York	
Win	23–0	(United States) Talmadge Griffis	TKO	5 (10)	07/06/2002	(United States) Rawhide Arena, Scottsdale, Arizona	
Win	22–0	(United States) Keith McKnight	TKO	6 (10)	05/04/2002	(United States) Alumni Arena, Buffalo, New York	
Win	21–0	(United States) Derrick Banks	TKO	1 (10)	02/11/2001	(United States) Foxwoods Resort, Mashantucket, Connecticut	
Win	20–0	(United States) Bert Cooper	TKO	7 (10)	27/07/2001	(United States) Civic Center, Niagara Falls, New York	
Win	19–0	(Cuba) Jorge Luis Gonzalez	TKO	4 (10)	27/04/2001	(United States) Civic Center, Niagara Falls, New York	
Win	18–0	(United States) Joey Guy	TKO	3 (10)	11/11/2000	Skylon Tower, Niagara Falls, Ontario, Canada	
Win	17–0	(United States) Matthew Green	KO	2 (6)	23/06/2000	(United States) Grand Casino, Biloxi, Mississippi	
Win	16–0	(United States) John Rainwater	TKO	3 (?)	25/02/2000	(United States) Rhodes-on-the Pawtuxet, Cranston, Rhode Island	
Win	15–0	(United States) Gary Winmon	TKO	1 (10)	17/12/1999	(United States) Lawrence Convention Center, Pittsburgh	
Win	14–0	(United States) Anthony Green	TKO	8 (10)	17/09/1999	(United States) Burt Flickinger Center, Buffalo, New York	Won USA New York State Heavyweight title.
Win	13–0	(Jamaica) Rowyan Wallace	KO	2 (6)	04/06/1999	(United States) Blue Horizon, Philadelphia	
Win	12–0	(United States) Brian Sargent	KO	1 (6)	24/04/1999	(United States) Arts Museum, Portland, Oregon	
Win	11–0	(United States) Dwayne Hall	TKO	1 (4)	19/02/1999	(United States) Turning Stone Casino, Verona, New York	
Win	10–0	(United States) Rodney McSwain	TKO	3 (6)	03/12/1998	(United States) Sheraton Hotel, Houston	
Win	9–0	(United States) Jihad Abdulaziz	UD	4	09/10/1998	(United States) Capitol Theatre, Port Chester, New York	
Win	8–0	(Mexico) Martin Lopez	KO	3 (6)	27/08/1998	(United States) Arena Theatre, Houston	
Win	7–0	(United States) Kevin Rosier	TKO	2 (4)	26/07/1998	(United States) Turning Stone Casino, Verona, New York	
Win	6–0	(United States) Art Bayliss	KO	1 (4)	25/06/1998	(United States) Foxwoods Resort, Mashantucket, Connecticut	
Win	5–0	(United States) Mike McGrady	TKO	2 (4)	02/04/1998	(United States) Erie County College, Buffalo, New York	
Win	4–0	(United States) Darryl Spratt	KO	1 (4)	20/02/1998	(United States) Argosy Festival Atrium, Baton Rouge, Louisiana	
Win	3–0	(United States) Calvin Smith	UD	4	04/12/1997	(United States) Pepsi Arena, Albany, New York	
Win	2–0	(United States) Jim Brackney	KO	2 (4)	25/11/1997	(United States) El Paso County Coliseum, El Paso, Texas	
Win	1–0	(United States) Dwane Cason Allen	KO	1 (4)	01/11/1997	(United States) Apollo Theater, New York	

== Accomplishments ==
- 1993 – Empire State Games Gold Medalist
- 1993 – New York State Golden Gloves Champion – Super Heavyweight Division
- 1995 – New York State Golden Gloves Champion – Super Heavyweight Division
- 1996 – New York State Golden Gloves Champion – Super Heavyweight Division
- 1996 – United States Olympic Alternate – Super Heavyweight Division
- 1999 – New York State Heavyweight Champion
- 2003 – North American Boxing Federation Heavyweight Champion
- 2007 – World Boxing Council USNBC Heavyweight Champion
- 2011 – Buffalo Boxing Hall of Fame
- 2018 – New York State Boxing Hall of Fame
- 2018 – Greater Buffalo Sports Hall of Fame

== See also ==
- Boxingscene.com article, 'Joe Mesi Return A Complex Proposition.
- Above article highlights a subsequent change in the rules applying to professional boxers in the State of Nevada which would allow Mesi to apply to fight in Nevada again (previously not so).

Preceded by Eliecer Castillo; Vacant	NABF Heavyweight champion June 24, 2003 – October 30, 2003; Vacates	Succeeded by Eliecer Castillo
Preceded by Vacant	WBC USNBC Heavyweight Champion; October 12, 2007–present Vacates	Incumbent
