= Mary Cornelius Winder =

Oneida Nation activist

Mary Cornelius Winder (April 27, 1898 – June 11, 1954) was a Native American activist who wrote a series of letters to the federal government related to Oneida Indian Nation ancestral land claims.

== Biography ==
=== Early life ===
Mary Winder, originally born Mary Cornelius, was a member of the Wolf Clan within the Oneida Indian Nation and grew up in Prattsburgh, New York. Prattsburgh was previously part of Oneida land that consisted of 6 million acres in the 17th century. During her childhood, she primarily spoke Oneida and lived with her blind grandmother, not learning English until she attended school. Her grandmother taught her about Oneida culture and traditional medicine. Winder's grandmother was especially known for her medicinal skill with rheumatism. Winder was also influenced by her father, Wilson Cornelius. Cornelius was an educated man who actively wrote letters to the federal government calling for the restoration of Oneida land, as his daughter would later continue to do. During her early adulthood, Mary Winder travelled abroad, visiting countries including Germany and Denmark. While travelling, she worked with a group of performers, putting on exhibitions and wearing traditional clothing to display her Oneida culture. Due to the start of the World War I, Winder had to cease her travels and return to the United States.

=== Later life and return to the US ===
Upon her return to the United States, Winder helped support her large family by managing a small grocery store. The store was located within the Onondaga Reservation and allowed customers to purchase goods on credit, which was unique at the time. Eventually, the store closed because of the Great Depression. Winder had eleven children over the course of her life; however, two died in early childhood. Despite the challenge of supporting a family, Winder was known to be especially compassionate towards children. The Great Depression heavily impacted the reservation, and Winder's family became known for taking in those that needed shelter or help. On one occasion, she let a child from a Mohawk reservation stay in her home for an entire summer. Winder continued to grow the traditional community around her by teaching arts and crafts at the New York State Fair as a member of the Six Nations Agricultural Society. Later in life, Winder moved to Bath, New York, where she spent her time gardening. At the age of 56, Winder died from lung cancer and was buried on the Onondaga Reservation where she had spent most of her life.

== Activism and letter writing campaign ==
=== First letter ===
Winder became involved with Oneida Nation activism at age 22 by calling for the return of reservation land that was guaranteed to her people by the 1794 Treaty of Canandaigua. This treaty was an agreement between the United States and the Six Nations of the Iroquois Confederacy that recognized tribal sovereignty and preserved Haudenosaunee land rights, which helped ease tensions between the Confederacy and the US after the Revolutionary War. Winder wrote her first letter to the Bureau of Indian Affairs (BIA) June 30, 1920 where she questioned why the Oneida had not been compensated for tribal land rented by non-tribal organizations. By this time, the original 300,000 acre Oneida reservation had been reduced to only 32 acres, due to pressure from the state to move Tribes westward. These 32 acres became central to the Oneida Nation, housing many important community buildings. Mary Winder began travelling to other areas to seek evidence, legal advice, and law professionals. After the Indian Reorganization Act of 1934, which sought to reduce Native American assimilation and redistribute land rights, Winder contacted the Oneida of Wisconsin. From this communication, the New York and Wisconsin Oneida were able to unite their land claim efforts.

=== 1940s letters ===
In April 1943, Winder wrote a letter to the Federal Indian Superintendent of the New York Indian Agency, Charles Berry. The letter expressed the continued frustration of the Oneida people not possessing homeland. She received a response stating that nothing could be done about the issue. This response led Winder to call for the creation of a formal organization, which is required for a land claim to be processed. Throughout the 1940s, Winder conducted research about land claims and evidence of how the Oneida were wronged by the federal government. After collecting information, Winder authored another letter in June 1948 to Theodore Haas, Chief Counsel of the Bureau of Indian Affairs (BIA), asking for the return of Oneida land from New York State or compensation for the land. She explained that the Oneida Nation had allied with the United States during the Revolutionary War, so the United States should help in returning the land they had promised. Shortly after the Revolutionary War, Oneida members Hanjyrrie Thowaweh Thasogweh, John Otaawiton, Nicholas Kanatjogh, and Cornelius Kakeghdotxa wrote a letter to George Washington. In this letter, the Oneida reminded the US President of the hardships they had endured for the US to become an independent nation and asked for their effort to be compensated. Several letters were also written by Oneida members to other US officials, including James Madison and Patrick Henry, with similar messages. Winder used these same arguments when writing her own letters. After her June 1948 letter, she followed up with two more, one in August 1948 and one in August 1949, both addressed to William Benge, the Federal Indian Superintendent of the New York Indian Agency at the time. Winder continued to explain the tragic reduction in Oneida lands and called for action from the BIA to return the lands or provide compensation to the Oneida people.

=== Letter results ===
Winder's letters often received no response or simple denials, much to the frustration of her and the Oneida Nation. While she would never see a promising solution during her lifetime, a land claim was officially filed three years before her death. The letters also helped instill a sense of perseverance and activism in her community and family. Winder's grandson, Arthur "Ray" Halbritter, has become a significant representative of the Oneida Nation as the CEO of Nation Enterprises. In August 2014 Halbritter aided in reclaiming approximately 13,000 acres of historic Oneida land, which was placed into a trust under the responsibility of the Department of the Interior. The 2014 victory for the Oneida Indian Nation was heavily based on the 2005 case, Sherrill v. Oneida, which proved that New York State had violated earlier treaties by allowing white settlers onto the 300,000-acre Oneida Reservation. However, the case also proved that too much time had passed for the Oneida to assert a sovereignty based land claim. Fortunately for the Oneida, the court stated that the Oneida could ask the Department of the Interior to place lands into a trust, since the 1794 treaty still held standing. The land claim into trust eventually came to a settlement between the Oneida Nation, the State of New York, the County of Madison, and the County of Oneida. Halbritter hopes to continue growing the land claim, re-collecting as much historical Oneida land as possible. The content of the case and settlement was essentially Winder's arguments and letters, which she had written over 50 years earlier. Winder has been cited by many Oneida members as an inspirational force and ahead of her time. Ray Halbritter told Oneida Indian Nation News, "The story of Mary Winder is the story of the Nation. It's because of my grandmother and my mother that I came back and became involved in the land claims and continue to carry on the struggle today."
