= Walt Bellamy =

American basketball player (1939–2013)

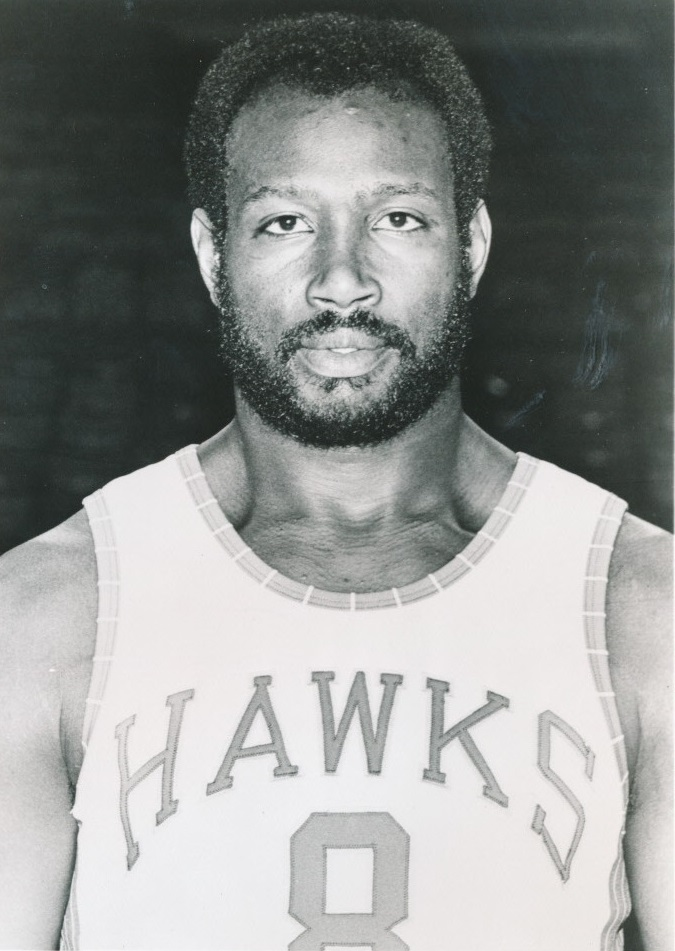
- Bellamy with the Atlanta Hawks in 1972

Personal information
- Born: July 24, 1939 New Bern, North Carolina, U.S.
- Died: November 2, 2013 (aged 74) College Park, Georgia, U.S.
- Listed height: 6 ft 10 in (2.08 m)
- Listed weight: 225 lb (102 kg)

Career information
- High school: J.T. Barber (New Bern, North Carolina)
- College: Indiana (1958–1961)
- NBA draft: 1961: 1st round, 1st overall pick
- Drafted by: Chicago Packers
- Playing career: 1961–1974
- Position: Center
- Number: 8

Career history
- 1961–1965: Chicago Packers / Zephyrs / Baltimore Bullets
- 1965–1968: New York Knicks
- 1968–1970: Detroit Pistons
- 1970–1974: Atlanta Hawks
- 1974: New Orleans Jazz

Career highlights
- 4× NBA All-Star (1962–1965); NBA Rookie of the Year (1962); Consensus second-team All-American (1961); First-team All-American – USBWA (1960); Second-team All-American – NEA (1960); Third-team All-American – UPI (1960)

Career statistics
- Points: 20,941 (20.1 ppg)
- Rebounds: 14,241 (13.7 rpg)
- Assists: 2,544 (2.4 apg)
- Stats at NBA.com
- Stats at Basketball Reference
- Basketball Hall of Fame
- Collegiate Basketball Hall of Fame
Medals
Men's basketball
Representing United States
Olympic Games
Gold medal – first place	1960 Rome	Team competition

Walter Jones "The Big Bell" Bellamy (July 24, 1939 – November 2, 2013) was an American professional basketball player. He played 13 full seasons as a center in the National Basketball Association (NBA) for four different franchises. Bellamy was inducted into the Naismith Memorial Basketball Hall of Fame twice: in 1993 for his individual career and again in 2010 as a member of the 1960 United States men's Olympic basketball team.

He was a star player for Indiana University in basketball, where he averaged 20.6 points and 15.5 rebounds per game over a three-year career, with a .517 field goal percentage. Bellamy was named an All-American and first-team All-Big Ten while at Indiana as a junior and senior. After his junior year, Bellamy was invited to join the 1960 United States men's Olympic basketball team. In the Olympic Games that year, the U.S. gold medal team won every game by an average of over 40 points and is considered among the best amateur level basketball teams of all time.

Bellamy was the first overall pick of the 1961 draft, when he was selected by the expansion team Chicago Packers. In his rookie season, he averaged 31.6 points and 19 rebounds per game on his way to winning Rookie of the Year in what has been called one of the best rookie seasons in NBA history. He had a double-double in every game in which he played during his rookie season.

After over four seasons with the franchise (which moved to Baltimore in 1963), Bellamy was traded to the New York Knicks in 1965. He played nearly four seasons with the Knicks before being traded to the Detroit Pistons, whereupon he played parts of two seasons before being traded to the Atlanta Hawks in the close of the 1969-70 season. He played four seasons for the team before playing one game for the New Orleans Jazz to close his career. Bellamy reached the Division finals in 1965 and 1970, but never played in the NBA Finals.

Bellamy was a durable player who played 74 or more games in thirteen consecutive seasons, including a record-setting 88 games in one season. He was an efficient scorer and leading rebounder who averaged over 20 points and 13 rebounds per game for his career. Bellamy ranked third all-time in field goal percentage at the time his career ended, after leading the NBA in field goal percentage as a rookie, being second to Wilt Chamberlain four times, and third in the NBA three times. He is 7th all-time in NBA history in rebounds per game. Bellamy was named an NBA All-Star during the first four seasons of his career. He was the second player (after Wilt Chamberlain) to score 20,000 points and have 14,000 rebounds for a career; only seven other players have achieved the mark since Bellamy.

== Early life ==
Bellamy was born on July 24, 1939, in New Bern, North Carolina. Money was tight and food sparse for his family. His father and grandfather were Masons, and his older brother was an early advocate against segregation. Bellamy attended West Street School and J.T. Barber High School, where the 6 ft 1 in (1.85 m) 14-year-old learned basic basketball skills from coach Simon Coates. As a senior in 1956, he was on the football team that won a state championship, with Bellamy gaining All-State honors as a football player.

As a member of J.T. Barber's basketball team; Bellamy averaged 19 points per game as a sophomore, 22 points per game as a junior, and 31 points per game as a senior. In 1956, he had 47 points in a state playoff basketball game and was All-State and All-Conference in basketball as a senior. He was also selected to play in two all-star games where he scored a combined 62 points. Bellamy graduated in 1957. There is a street named for him in New Bern.

== College career ==
Bellamy chose to play basketball at Indiana University under coach Branch McCracken. Bellamy's high school coach Simon Coates had attended graduate courses at Indiana, and initiated an interest in Bellamy to attend Indiana. Bellamy himself recalled: "In the summer after my junior year of high school I played with some guys from Indiana. Indiana at the time was the closest school to the South that would accept African-Americans. It was an easy transition for me to make. Not that I was naive to what was going on in Bloomington in terms of the times, but it didn't translate to the athletic department or the classroom. Every relationship was good".

Bellamy played center for three years on Indiana's varsity team (1958 to 1961). As a sophomore (1958–59), his Indiana team had an 11–11 record. Bellamy averaged 17.4 points and 15.2 rebounds per game. He was third in the Big Ten Conference in total rebounds (335) as well as rebounds per game. The Associated Press (AP) and United Press International (UPI) named Bellamy second-team All-Big Ten in 1959.

Indiana was 20–4 the next season (1959–60), and was ranked No. 7 in the AP's final poll that season. The 6 ft 11 in (2.08 m) 225 lb (102 kg) Bellamy averaged 22.4 points and 13.5 rebounds per game; with a .535 field goal percentage. He was third among all Big Ten players in total points (537); and fourth in points per game, total rebounds (324), and rebounds per game. The Associated Press and United Press International named Bellamy first-team All-Big Ten in 1960. The Newspaper Enterprise Association (NEA) named Bellamy a second-team All-American in 1960. The Associated Press and UPI named him a third-team All-American. Bellamy was among the 10 players chosen as All-Americans by the United States Basketball Writers Association for Look magazine in 1960.

As a senior (1960–61), Bellamy averaged 21.8 points and 17.8 rebounds per game; with a .501 field goal percentage. He was first among all Big Ten players in rebounds per game, second in total rebounds (428), and fourth in both points per game and total points (522). The Newspaper Enterprise Association selected Bellamy a first-team All-American in 1961. The Associated Press and United Press International named Bellamy a second-team All-American in 1961, and he was a consensus second-team All American. The Associated Press named Bellamy first-team All-Big Ten again in 1961, and United Press International named him second-team All-Big Ten.

Bellamy had 27 points and 28 rebounds in a March 6, 1961 game against the Wisconsin Badgers, setting an Indiana single game rebounding record. The following week in his last collegiate basketball game, Bellamy broke that record with 33 rebounds, while also scoring 28 points, in an 82–67 win over Michigan. The 33 rebounds is still a Big Ten Conference and Indiana record for rebounds in a single game.

Bellamy played in 70 career games for Indiana, with 1,441 points (20.6 per game), 1,087 rebounds (15.5 per game) and a .517 career field goal percentage. He graduated from Indiana University holding the school record for most rebounds in a career, which stood as the school record until broken by Alan Henderson in 1995; with Bellamy now third all-time in career rebounds for Indiana. Bellamy's 17.8 rebounds per game and 428 total rebounds as a senior are school single season records (through 2025–26). His career 59 double-doubles at Indiana is also a school record. His career scoring average is fourth best in Indiana history.

== 1960 Olympics ==
Bellamy was the starting center on the gold medal-winning 1960 United States men's Olympic basketball team at the 1960 Summer Olympics. Ten of the 12 players on the undefeated American squad went on to play professionally in the NBA, including fellow Big Ten player Terry Dischinger (a future Bellamy NBA teammate in Chicago and Baltimore), and fellow future Hall of Famers Jerry West, Oscar Robertson, and Jerry Lucas. The team produced four consecutive NBA rookies of the year, and three members of the NBA's 50 greatest players list announced in 1996. Bellamy averaged 7.9 points per game, over eight games, and the U.S. men's team won their games by an average of over 40 points per game.

== NBA career ==
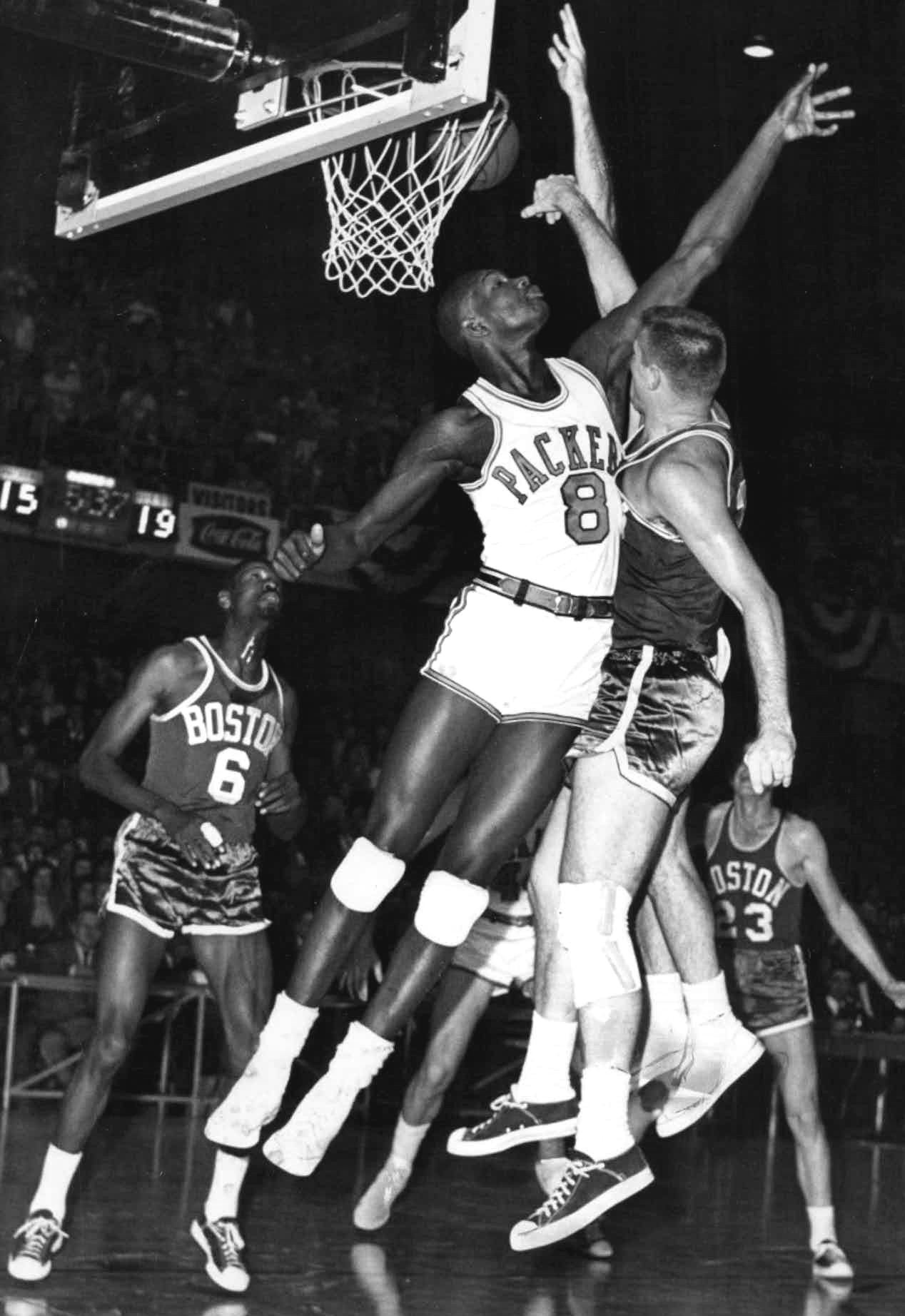
Bellamy (No. 8) averaged 31.6 points per game and 19.0 rebounds per game during his rookie season.

Bellamy had a stellar 13-year career in the NBA (1961 to 1974), and was inducted into the Naismith Basketball Hall of Fame in 1993. He was nicknamed "the Big Bell".

=== Chicago Packers/Zephyrs and Baltimore Bullets ===
Bellamy was the NBA first overall draft pick in 1961, drafted by the Chicago Packers; the NBA's first expansion team. Bellamy was named the NBA Rookie of the Year in 1962 after having arguably one of the three greatest rookie seasons in NBA history along with Hall of Famers Wilt Chamberlain and Oscar Robertson; at least as to highest scoring averages. Bellamy's 31.6 points per game average that season is second all-time for an NBA rookie to Chamberlain's 37.6 points per game, and ahead of Robertson's 30.5 points per game.

Bellamy's 19 rebounds per game average in 1961–62 is the third-best all-time rookie mark (to Chamberlain's 27 and Bill Russell's 19.6 rebounds per game). No NBA rookie has since surpassed Bellamy's 973 field goals during the 1961–62 season, and the only rookie with more field goals was Wilt Chamberlain with 1,065. Others have rated Bellamy's rookie season highly, but not among the top three in NBA history when looking at factors beyond the highest scoring numbers and personal statistics; and some do not include him in their top 10.

Bellamy's .519 field goal percentage led the NBA in his rookie season (ahead of Chamberlain's .506). His 31.6 points per game was second in the NBA to Chamberlain's 50.4 points per game; and Bellamy's 2,495 total points were also second to Chamberlain's 4,029 points. Bellamy was third in total rebounds (1,500) and rebounds per game to Chamberlain (2052, 25.6) and Bill Russell (1790, 23.6). Bellamy was a starter as a rookie in the 1962 NBA All-Star Game, and had a 23-point, 17-rebound performance. Bellamy had a double-double in all 79 games in which he played during the 1961–62 season; scoring over 40 points in 12 games and having 20 or more rebounds in 37 games (with 30 or more twice).

In Bellamy's first career game against Chamberlain on November 19, 1961, Bellamy did not score in the first half; Chamberlain blocking Bellamy's first nine shots. At the end of that game between the Packers and Philadelphia Warriors, Chamberlain had 51 points and 16 rebounds, and Bellamy had 14 points and 17 rebounds. The following week Bellamy played against Chamberlain again, with 27 points and 21 rebounds to Chamberlain's 39 points and 38 rebounds. In their third meeting Bellamy had 39 points and 27 rebounds, but Chamberlain had 61 points and 36 rebounds. In a late January game, Bellamy had 47 points and 26 rebounds against Chamberlain, who had 55 points and 32 rebounds. Bellamy finally outscored Chamberlain for the first time in the 10th and final game they played against each other that season, 38 to 34; an overtime game where both Bellamy and Chamberlain played all 53 minutes.

On January 10, 1962, Bellamy had 35 points and 30 rebounds against Hall of Fame center Bill Russell and the Boston Celtics; including 12 rebounds in the second period alone. Russell had 14 points and 18 rebounds. The expansion Packers defeated the NBA champion Celtics 103–90. Russell is considered the greatest defensive center in NBA history, but as a 22-year old rookie Bellamy played well against Russell in a number of other games that season: December 1 (33 points and 25 rebounds), December 14 (41 points and 22 rebounds), January 31 (47 points and 23 rebounds), February 5 (34 points and 25 rebounds), and March 8 (31 points and 23 rebounds).

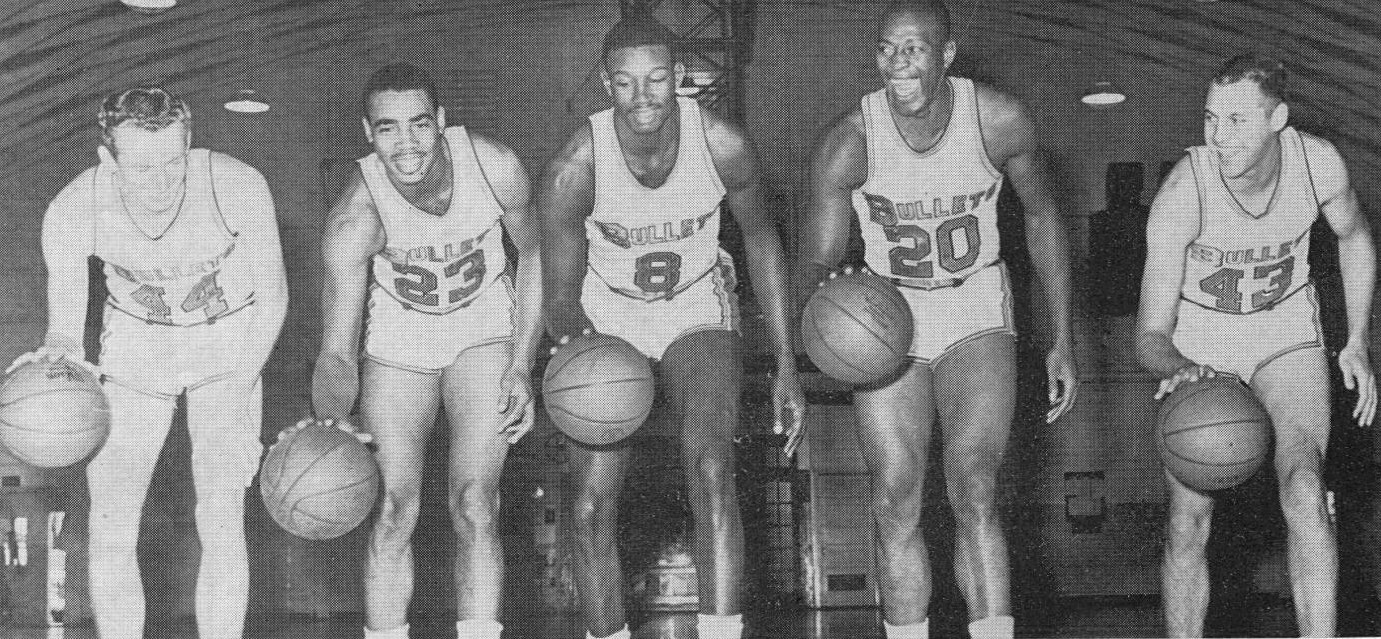
Members of the 1963–64 Baltimore Bullets, from left to rightː Rod Thorn, Charles Hardnett, Walt Bellamy, Gus Johnson, and Terry Dischinger. Thorn, Bellamy and Johnson were elected to the Naismith Basketball Hall of Fame.

The following season (1962–63), Bellamy played for the renamed Chicago Zephyrs. He averaged 41.3 minutes, 27.9 points, 16.4 rebounds and 2.9 assists per game. His 1960 Olympic teammate Terry Dischinger joined the team that season. Both Bellamy and Dischinger were selected to play in the 1963 NBA All-Star Game, with Bellamy named as a starter for the second consecutive season.

Bellamy was third in the NBA that season in total rebounds (1,309) and rebounds per game (behind Chamberlain and Russell), and was fifth in total points (2,233) and points per game. His .527 field goal percentage was second only to Chamberlain's .528 field goal percentage. He had 46 points and 22 rebounds to Chamberlain's 54 points and 27 rebounds in a November 9, 1962 loss to the Warriors. In a January 29, 1963 one-point loss against the Celtics, Bellamy had 33 points and 24 rebounds to Russell's 10 points and 18 rebounds.

Bellamy started the NBA All-Star Game for the third consecutive season in 1963–64. The franchise had moved to Baltimore, as the Baltimore Bullets. Bellamy averaged 42.4 minutes, 27 points, and 17 rebounds per game. He was third in the NBA that season in field goal percentage (.513), fourth in rebounding average, total points (2,159) and total rebounds (1,361), and fifth in scoring average. In the first game of the season, Bellamy had 32 points and 28 rebounds in 30 minutes against Russell and the Celtics. In the season's third game he had 36 points and 23 rebounds against Chamberlain and the Warriors in a one-point loss. He had games of 45 points and 15 rebounds, 29 points and 25 rebounds, and 25 points and 23 rebounds against the Celtics that season.

In 1964–65, Bellamy was selected to play in the NBA All-Star Game for a fourth consecutive season. He averaged 41.3 minutes, 24.8 points, 14.6 rebounds, and 2.4 assists per game for the Bullets that season, with a .509 field goal percentage. In early December 1964, Bellamy scored 37 points and had 37 rebounds in a win against the St. Louis Hawks. His 37 rebounds was his career-high in rebounds. Bellamy's .509 field goal percentage was second in the NBA to Chamberlain's .510 that season, and he was sixth in the NBA in scoring and rebounding average.

The Bullets defeated the St. Louis Hawks and future Hall of Fame center Zelmo Beaty in the first round of the 1965 NBA playoffs in four games; Bellamy averaging 42.5 minutes, 18.5 points, and 15 rebounds per game. He had 20 points and 20 rebounds in Game 1, and 23 points and 18 rebounds in Game 3; both Bullets victories. The Bullets lost in six games to the Los Angeles Lakers in the Western Division finals. Bellamy averaged 22.5 points, 15.5 rebounds, and 4.3 assists in that series.

Bellamy led the franchise in scoring and rebounding during his first four seasons. The Bullets had new ownership going into the 1965–66 season, and they offered Bellamy a contract with a $5,000 pay reduction claiming he had not given full effort the previous season. In response, Bellamy held out during training camp; eventually signing before the start of the season, with a slight pay increase. On November 1, 1965, the Bullets traded Bellamy to the New York Knicks for Johnny Green, Johnny Egan, Jim Barnes and cash. Bellamy had been coveted by the Knicks since he entered the league. Bellamy played in only eight games for the Bullets that year before being traded, averaging 33.5 minutes, 19 points and 14.5 rebounds per game.

=== New York Knicks and Detroit Pistons ===
Rookie of the Year, 1965 NBA All-Star, and future Hall of Famer Willis Reed was the Knicks starting center during the 1964–65 season. The Knicks moved Reed to power forward after acquiring Bellamy the next season. Bellamy played in 72 games for the Knicks during the 1965–66 season. Bellamy averaged 42.8 minutes, 23.2 points, 16 rebounds, and three assists per game with the Knicks. For his total 80 games played in 1964–65, Bellamy ended the NBA season third in field goal percentage (.505), fifth in total points (1,820), total rebounds (1,254) and rebounds per game (15.7), and seventh in points per game (22.8).

In the 1966–67 season, Bellamy remained at center with Reed (an NBA-All Star and second-team All-NBA) at power forward. Bellamy averaged 38.1 minutes, 19 points, and 13.5 rebounds per game that season. Bellamy's .521 field goal percentage was again second only to Chamberlain's that season, and he was seventh in rebounds per game. Bellamy appeared in the 1967 NBA playoffs, averaging 18.3 points, 16.5 rebounds, and three assists in a four-game first round series loss to the Celtics.

The next season (1967–68), Bellamy played in all 82 games but started only 64. He averaged 16.7 points and 11.7 rebounds for the Knicks at center, while Reed was an all-star and second-team All-NBA player for the second consecutive season. The Knicks lost to Wilt Chamberlain and the Philadelphia 76ers in the first round of the 1968 NBA playoffs in six games; with Bellamy averaging 46.2 minutes, 20 points, 16 rebounds, and 3.5 assists per game. His .541 field goal percentage that season was again second to Chamberlain in the NBA.

On December 19, 1968, the Knicks traded Bellamy and Howard Komives to the Detroit Pistons for future Hall of Fame power forward Dave DeBusschere, and made Reed their center. The trade allowed Reed to move back to his natural center position, and gave the Knicks a true power forward. After the trade, Reed stated "'Since the trade I feel like a new person . . . Center is my position'". With Reed and DeBusschere, the Knicks reached the Eastern Division finals in 1969, and made the playoffs every year from 1969 to 1974, winning two NBA championships. Naismith Memorial Basketball Hall of Fame Curt Gowdy Media Award writer Peter Vecsey believes that the significance of this trade to the Knicks future success obscured the fact that Bellamy was one of the top players in NBA history.

At the beginning of the 1968–69 season, Bellamy played in 35 games for the Knicks, averaging 32.5 minutes, 15.2 points and 11 rebounds per game. Bellamy played in 53 games for the Pistons, averaging 38.2 minutes, 18.8 points, 13.5 rebounds and 1.9 assists per game. Due to trades between teams with offset game schedules during the 1968–69 season, Bellamy set a still-standing record for NBA games played in a single season with 88. On the season, he averaged 35.9 minutes, 17.4 points, and 12.5 rebounds per game.

Bellamy played in 56 games for the Pistons during the 1969–70 season, averaging 20.9 minutes, 10 points, and 7.1 rebounds per game. On February 1, 1970, the Pistons traded Bellamy to the Atlanta Hawks for cash and a player to be named later.

=== Atlanta Hawks and New Orleans Jazz ===
Bellamy became the Hawks' starting center. In 23 games, he averaged 37.2 minutes, 15.5 points, 13.5 rebounds, and 3.8 assists per game during the remainder of the 1969–70 season. The Hawks defeated the Chicago Bulls in five games in the first round of the 1970 NBA playoffs. Bellamy averaged 40.6 minutes, 14.2 points, 15.4 rebounds, and 5.2 assists per game. The Hawks lost the 1970 Western Division finals in four games to Chamberlain and the Los Angeles Lakers. Bellamy averaged 41.3 minutes, 20 points, 15.8 rebounds, and 2.3 assists per game in the series.

Overall in 1969–70, Bellamy averaged 25.7 minutes, 11.6 points, and 8.9 rebounds per game. He had averaged a double-double in his first eight seasons before that (1961 to 1969). This was Bellamy's only full NBA season playing less than 31.7 minutes per game. He did average 12.6 rebounds and 16.3 points per 36 minutes that season.

The next season with the Hawks (1970–71), Bellamy played in all 82 games at center, averaging 35.5 minutes, 14.7 points, 12.9 rebounds, and 2.8 assists per game, with a .493 field goal percentage. In the first round of the 1971 NBA playoffs, the Hawks lost to the Knicks and Reed in five games, with Bellamy averaging 43.2 minutes, 20.8 points, 14.4 rebounds, and two assists per game in that series.

In the 1971–72 season, his 11th NBA season, Bellamy again was the Hawks starting center. He played in all 82 games, averaging 38.9 minutes, 18.6 points, 12.8 rebounds, and 3.2 assists per game; with a .545 field goal percentage. He was third in the NBA in field goal percentage, behind only Chamberlain and Kareem Abdul-Jabbar. The Hawks lost in six games to the Boston Celtics in the Eastern Conference semifinals of the 1972 NBA playoffs. Bellamy averaged 41.2 minutes, 18.5 points, 13.7 rebounds, and 1.8 assists per game in that series, with a .488 field goal percentage.

Bellamy played 74 games for the Hawks at center the following season (1972–73), averaging 37.9 minutes, 16.1 points, 13 rebounds, and 2.4 assists per game with a .505 field goal percentage. The Hawks lost to the Celtics again in the first round of the 1973 NBA playoffs; with Bellamy averaging 41.2 minutes, 13.7 points, and 12.2 rebounds per game. Bellamy played in 77 games for the Hawks during the 1973–74 season. He averaged 31.7 minutes, 13.1 points, 9.6 rebounds, and 2.5 assists per game. This was his 13th NBA season.

The Hawks did not protect Bellamy in the 1974 NBA expansion draft, and he was selected by the New Orleans Jazz. Bellamy believed at the time this was part of a subterfuge between the Hawks and the Jazz, in connection with the Jazz's acquiring Pete Maravich; and the Hawks hoping to force Bellamy into retirement with one year remaining on his contract. Bellamy played in the first game for the Jazz franchise, on October 17, 1974. He played fourteen minutes and scored six points while recording five rebounds in the 89-74 loss to the New York Knicks. It was Bellamy's final NBA game as he was waived the next day. The Jazz stated Bellamy was waived so he could negotiate a deal with a new team of his choice. He worked out with the Milwaukee Bucks soon after, but did not play in the NBA again.

== Legacy and honors ==
Bellamy is a two-time Naismith Memorial Basketball Hall of Fame inductee, being inducted in 1993 for his individual career, and in 2010 as a member of the 1960 United States men's Olympic basketball team. In 2000, he was selected to Indiana University's All-Century Team. In 1982, he was inducted into the Indiana University Athletic Hall of Fame. Bellamy was picked No. 1 in the 1961 NBA draft and named NBA Rookie of the Year, becoming the first player from Indiana University to achieve that status and honor.

Over his NBA career, Bellamy played in 1,043 regular season games, with 20,941 points and 14,241 rebounds. He averaged 37.3 minutes, 20.1 points, 13.7 rebounds, and 2.4 assists per game. Bellamy is 7th all-time in NBA history in rebounds per game, and 8th in combined ABA/NBA history (through 2025–26). He is 12th all-time in NBA history in total rebounds and 13th in combined ABA/NBA history . He is 43rd in NBA history in total points, and 48th in combined ABA/NBA history. He is 93rd all-time in NBA history in field goal percentage, and 97th in combined ABA/NBA history. Bellamy led the NBA in field goal percentage as a rookie, was second to Wilt Chamberlain four times in field goal percentage, and was third in field goal percentage three times.

When Bellamy retired, he was the sixth all-time leading scoring and third all-time in rebounding and field goal percentage in NBA history. Bellamy was the second player (after Wilt Chamberlain) to score 20,000 points and have 14,000 rebounds for a career; only seven other players have achieved the mark since Bellamy. During a period from 1964 to 1966 he was the all-time NBA leader in field goal percentage, but was passed by Chamberlain. Bellamy played in at least 74 games per season over his first 13 seasons, and played in 80 or more games eight times, including a record 88 games in one regular season. He averaged a double-double in 11 of his 13 full NBA seasons; only missing one season where he was used part-time (still averaging 8.9 rebounds in less than 26 minutes per game), and another where he averaged 9.6 rebounds per game.

== Personal life ==
After his retirement from the NBA, Bellamy was active with the NAACP, the Atlanta Urban League, the YMCA in the Atlanta area, and served on the boards of the Southern Christian Leadership Conference, the Atlanta Police Athletic League and the National Scholarship Service for Negro Students. He served as a Goodwill Ambassador and member of the Executive Committee of the NAACP's Georgia State Conference. In 1987, he was elected first president of the College Park, Georgia NAACP branch. From 1977-81 he was Senate sergeant-at-arms in Georgia's General assembly, was chair of the Fulton County Democratic Committee, and was a delegate to the 1976, 1984 and 1988 Democratic National Conventions. On October 13, 1974, he was honored with the Atlanta Salutes Walt Bellamy Day because of his civic contributions during his playing career.

Bellamy was a member of Alpha Phi Alpha fraternity. His half-brother is professional boxer Ron Bellamy.

== Death ==
Bellamy died on November 2, 2013, at the age of 74. He was survived by his wife of 53 years, Helen Hollie Ragland Bellamy, son Derrin Bellamy, and two grandsons. He was buried at Atlanta's South-View Cemetery.

== NBA career statistics ==
Legend
GP	Games played	GS	Games started	MPG	Minutes per game
FG%	Field goal percentage	3P%	3-point field goal percentage	FT%	Free throw percentage
RPG	Rebounds per game	APG	Assists per game	SPG	Steals per game
BPG	Blocks per game	PPG	Points per game	**Bold**	Career high
*	Led the league	‡	NBA record

=== Regular season ===
Year	Team	GP	GS	MPG	FG%	3P%	FT%	RPG	APG	SPG	BPG	PPG
1961–62	Chicago	79	–	42.3	.519*	–	.644	**19.0**	2.7	–	–	**31.6**
1962–63	Chicago	80*	–	41.3	.527	–	.674	16.4	2.9	–	–	27.9
1963–64	Baltimore	80	–	42.4	.513	–	.651	17.0	1.6	–	–	27.0
1964–65	Baltimore	80*	–	41.3	.509	–	.685	14.6	2.4	–	–	24.8
1965–66	Baltimore	8*	–	33.5	.452	–	.597	12.8	2.3	–	–	19.0
1965–66	New York	72*	72	**42.8**	.512	–	.627	16.0	3.0	–	–	23.2
1966–67	New York	79	**78**	38.1	.521	–	.636	13.5	2.6	–	–	19.0
1967–68	New York	82	64	32.9	.541	–	.662	11.7	2.0	–	–	16.7
1968–69	New York	**35**‡	31	32.5	.507	–	.619	11.0	2.2	–	–	15.2
1968–69	Detroit	**53**‡	31	38.2	.512	–	.663	13.5	1.9	–	–	18.8
1969–70	Detroit	56	–	20.9	.547	–	.562	7.1	1.0	–	–	10.0
1969–70	Atlanta	23	–	37.2	.491	–	.605	13.5	**3.8**	–	–	15.5
1970–71	Atlanta	82	–	35.5	.493	–	.604	12.9	2.8	–	–	14.7
1971–72	Atlanta	82	–	38.9	.545	–	.585	12.8	3.2	–	–	18.6
1972–73	Atlanta	74	–	37.9	.505	–	.538	13.0	2.4	–	–	16.1
1973–74	Atlanta	77	–	31.7	.486	–	.608	9.6	2.5	**.7**	**.6**	13.1
1974–75	New Orleans	1	–	14.0	**1.000**	–	**1.000**	5.0	.0	.0	.0	6.0
Career		1,043	–	37.3	.516	–	.632	13.7	2.4	.7	.6	20.1
All-Star		4	3	20.8	.500	–	.526	7.5	1.0	–	–	12.0

=== Playoffs ===
Year	Team	GP	GS	MPG	FG%	3P%	FT%	RPG	APG	SPG	BPG	PPG
1965	Baltimore	**10**	–	42.7	.468	–	.663	15.1	3.4	–	–	**20.9**
1967	New York	4	–	39.3	.519	–	.586	**16.5**	3.0	–	–	18.3
1968	New York	6	–	**46.2**	.421	–	.625	16.0	3.5	–	–	20.0
1970	Atlanta	9	–	40.9	.468	–	.717	15.6	**3.9**	–	–	16.8
1971	Atlanta	5	–	43.2	**.594**	–	**.759**	14.4	2.0	–	–	20.8
1972	Atlanta	6	–	41.2	.488	–	.628	13.7	1.8	–	–	18.5
1973	Atlanta	6	–	41.2	.395	–	.452	12.2	2.2	–	–	13.7
Career		46	–	42.2	.471	–	.642	14.8	3.0	–	–	18.5

== See also ==
- List of NBA career scoring leaders
- List of NBA career rebounding leaders
- List of NBA career personal fouls leaders
- List of NBA career free throw scoring leaders
- List of NBA career minutes played leaders
- List of NBA rookie single-season scoring leaders
