= Aaron Martin (American football) =

American football player (1941–2017)

No. 42, 40
- Position: Cornerback

Personal information
- Born: February 10, 1941; New Bern, North Carolina, U.S.
- Died: January 9, 2017 (aged 75); Gambrills, Maryland, U.S.
- Listed height: 6 ft 0 in (1.83 m)
- Listed weight: 190 lb (86 kg)

Career information
- High school: J.T. Barber (New Bern)
- College: North Carolina Central (1960-1963)
- NFL draft: 1964: undrafted

Career history
- Los Angeles Rams (1964–1965); Philadelphia Eagles (1966–1967); Washington Redskins (1968); Bridgeport Jets (1969); Los Angeles Rams (1970)*
- * Offseason or practice squad member only

Career NFL statistics
- Interceptions: 11
- Fumble recoveries: 5
- Kick/punt return yards: 554
- Total touchdowns: 3
- Stats at Pro Football Reference

Aaron Beamon Martin Sr. (February 10, 1941 – January 9, 2017) was an American professional football player who was a cornerback in the National Football League (NFL) for the Los Angeles Rams, the Philadelphia Eagles, and the Washington Redskins. He played college football for the North Carolina Central Eagles, earning induction into the school's Alex M. Rivera Athletics Hall of Fame.

Martin died on January 9, 2017, at the age of 75.
