= Felix S. Cohen =

American lawyer and scholar (1907–1953)

- Born: July 3, 1907; Manhattan, New York City, U.S.
- Died: October 19, 1953 (aged 46)

Education
- Education: City College of New York; Harvard University; Columbia University

Philosophical work
- Era: 20th-century philosophy
- Region: Western philosophy
- School: Legal realism
- Main interests: Legal philosophy

Felix Solomon Cohen (July 3, 1907 – October 19, 1953) was an American lawyer and scholar who made a lasting mark on legal philosophy and fundamentally shaped federal Indian law and policy.

== Biography ==
Felix S. Cohen was born in Manhattan, New York City, in 1907 and grew up in Yonkers. Cohen attended the City College of New York, and received an M.A. and Ph.D. in philosophy from Harvard University in 1927 and 1929, respectively. Cohen entered Columbia Law School in 1928 and graduated in 1931. He was the legislation and book review editor of the Columbia Law Review, serving under Editor-in-Chief Herbert Wechsler.

Cohen became a leading figure in Legal Realism, a legal movement that challenged the Formalist idea that legal principles could be discerned in the abstract, separate from their enforcement, judicial interpretation, or impact on society. Cohen's most famous contribution to this debate was "Transcendental Nonsense and the Functional Approach", which ran in the Columbia Law Review in 1935 and remains among the most-cited law review articles ever written.

Franklin Roosevelt's New Deal administration brought Cohen from academic study to public service. Cohen worked in the Solicitor's Office of the Department of the Interior from 1933 to 1947. In this position, Cohen was the primary legal architect of the Indian New Deal, a federal policy that sought to strengthen tribal governments and reduce federal domination of Indian tribes. Cohen was the drafter of the centerpiece legislation of this era, the 1934 Indian Reorganization Act. In his research on Indian law, he was assisted by his wife Lucy Kramer Cohen (1907-2007). She had studied mathematics and anthropology at Barnard College in the 1920s and earned her master's degree in mathematics from Columbia University. With background in anthropology, economics, and statistics, she had worked for anthropology professor Franz Boas.

In 1939 Felix Cohen became Chief of the Indian Law Survey, an effort to compile the federal laws and treaties regarding American Indians. The resulting book, published in 1941 as The Handbook of Federal Indian Law, became much more than a simple survey. The Handbook was the first to show how hundreds of years of diverse treaties, statutes, and decisions formed a comprehensive whole. Today, Cohen is credited with creating the modern field of Federal Indian Law. Although the treatise began as a joint project between the Department of Interior and the Department of Justice, Justice fired Cohen from the project and terminated the survey. The motivations of Justice are not entirely clear. Cohen seemed to believe that antisemitism was at play, but there were also substantial ideological differences between Cohen and his supervisors at Justice. Justice may have been concerned that the book would be too powerful a tool for Indian tribes. Ultimately, the book was published, but under the auspices of Interior alone. For this work, Cohen received the department's Distinguished Service Award in 1948. The University of New Mexico reissued the initial Handbook in 1971, and updated versions of the Handbook were published in 1982 and 2005.

Cohen left government service in 1947 after federal policy shifted from one of support for tribal governments to that of terminating tribal sovereign status. He then entered private legal practice and taught legal philosophy at Yale Law School, The City College of New York, and Rutgers Law School. In 1951 Cohen published Readings in Jurisprudence and Legal Philosophy with his father, Professor Morris R. Cohen. While in private practice, Cohen litigated Indian land claims, won the right to vote for American Indians in New Mexico and Arizona, and successfully challenged Arizona's practice of denying social security benefits to Indians. He also continued to write and advocate regarding Federal Indian Law, publishing The Erosion of Indian Rights 1950-1953: A Case Study in Bureaucracy, 62 Yale L. J. 348 (1952–53), shortly before his untimely death in 1953. Cohen had also become increasingly committed to fighting other forms of oppression, in particular to securing the rights of immigrants and ethnic minorities. His major articles are anthologized in The Legal Conscience: Selected Papers of Felix S. Cohen, which was edited and assembled by his widow Lucy Kramer Cohen in 1960.

== See also ==
- Native American–Jewish relations

== Selected works ==
- Cohen, Felix S. (1942). Handbook of federal Indian law : with reference tables and index. Washington, D.C.: GPO. LCCN 42038386.
- Cohen, Felix S. (1933). Ethical systems and legal ideals : an essay on the foundations of legal criticism (Reprint ed.). Westport, Conn.: Greenwood Press. LCCN 75040440.
- Cohen, Felix S. (1960). The legal conscience, selected papers. Edited by Lucy Kramer Cohen. Foreword by Felix Frankfurter. Introd. by Eugene V. Rostow. New Haven, Conn.: Yale University Press. LCCN 60014249.
- Cohen, Felix S. (1929). What is a Question?. Oxford University Press.
