= Pietro Lazzari =

American painter

- Born: May 15, 1895; Rome, Italy
- Died: May 1, 1979 (aged 83)

Pietro Lazzari (May 15, 1895 – May 1, 1979) was an Italian-American artist and sculptor. He is known for his sculptures, paintings, murals, illustrations, and printmaking.

== Education ==
Pietro Lazzari received his formal education from the Ornamental School of Rome (Master Artist). After the end of the First World War, Lazzari joined the Italian Futurist movement and exhibited with such artists as Giacomo Balla and Gino Severini. He then moved to Paris for several years before returning to Rome where his first solo exhibition was held at the Theatre of the Independents.

== America ==
With the rise of Fascism, Lazzari left Italy for New York in 1925. In the following year he was one of nine European artists who contributed to an important exhibition at the New Gallery. Other participating artists included Pablo Picasso, Pascin and Amedeo Modigliani.

During the era of the Great Depression Lazzari became an American citizen and did commissions for the Works Progress Administration and the Federal Art Project including murals and sculptures. He also participated in the influential Abstract Art in America exhibition at the Whitney Museum of American Art.

In the early 1940s, Pietro Lazzari moved permanently to Washington D.C., where he established his studio and participated in the World War II National Artists for Victory exhibition at the Metropolitan Museum of Art (1942). During the following years Lazzari was awarded a Fulbright Fellowship and received commissions for bronze portraits of Pope Paul VI and Eleanor Roosevelt. Beginning in the 1950s, Lazzari worked closely with Lucy Kramer Cohen, a civil servant and amateur artist who managed his correspondence with figures like Roosevelt and publicized his work in Washington, D.C.

== Career ==
Lazzari was a full member of the National Society of Mural Painters, Artists Equity Association, Art Guild of Washington and the Washington Watercolor Society. He also taught sculpture and drawing techniques at the American University, Washington DC (1948–50), and at the Corcoran School of Art (1965–69). Today his sculpture, paintings and drawings are found in such major collections as the Whitney Museum of American Art, New York, Art Institute of Chicago, Washington Gallery of Modern Art, the Smithsonian Institution, Miami Museum of Modern Art, Georgetown University and the San Francisco Museums of Fine Art.

His work includes a pair of murals in the Jasper, Florida post office, commissioned by the Treasury Section of Fine Arts, and completed in 1942. The works, Harvest at Home and News from Afar deal with subjects at home during war-time. He also painted a mural, Good News in "glazed tempera" for the post office in Brevard, North Carolina and The Kinfolk of Virginia Dare (1938) in Sanford, North Carolina.
