= Ron Bellamy =

American boxer

"Rockin'" Ronald Lee Bellamy (born December 13, 1964) is an American professional boxer. He is the half-brother of former NBA center Walt Bellamy. Ron also started his career in basketball, playing collegiately at UNC-Charlotte and professionally in New Zealand and Europe.

At age 35, with his basketball playing days over, Bellamy entered a career as a professional boxer. In his career, he has amassed a record of 14 wins (9 knockouts), 5 losses, and 4 draws. Bellamy was the opponent in Joe Mesi's comeback bout on April 1, 2006, and he lost to Mesi by unanimous decision.
