= Lucy Kramer Cohen =

American anthropologist (1907-2007)

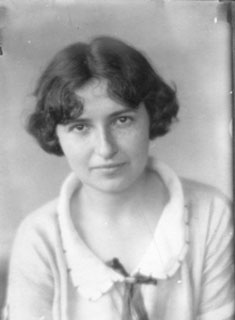
- Lucy Kramer Cohen, circa 1924
- Born: Lucy Michelle Kramer; May 22, 1907; Brooklyn, New York
- Died: January 2, 2007 (aged 99); Washington, D.C.
- Occupations: Anthropologist, civil servant

Lucy Kramer Cohen (May 22, 1907 – January 2, 2007) was an American anthropologist and civil servant who worked with her husband Felix S. Cohen on the Indian Reorganization Act and The Handbook of Federal Indian Law, which are both considered landmarks in Native American legal history in the United States. After her husband's death in 1953, she edited The Legal Conscience, a collection of Felix's writings published by Yale University Press in 1960. Initially, Kramer Cohen's contributions to her husband's work were not widely recognized. In 2005, a revised edition of The Handbook of Federal Indian Law was dedicated to Kramer Cohen in honor of her work.

== Early life ==
Lucy Kramer was born in 1907 to a Jewish family in Brooklyn, New York. She received her bachelor's degree from Barnard College in 1928 and earned master's degrees in mathematics and anthropology from Columbia University, where she studied under anthropologist Franz Boas. Kramer met Felix S. Cohen in 1925, and they married in 1931.

== Career ==
In 1933, Felix Cohen accepted a position in the solicitor's office of the United States Department of the Interior and Kramer Cohen joined him, often working without pay due to federal employment rules during the Great Depression. Together, the Cohens conducted a comprehensive survey of Native American tribes in the United States, which led to the creation of the Indian Reorganization Act of 1934, also known as the Wheeler-Howard Act. Lucy Kramer Cohen drafted the questionnaires for the surveys and tabulated the results. The Cohens' next project at the Department of the Interior was The Handbook of Federal Indian Law, which compiled decades of legal precedents concerning relations between Native Americans and the United States government. Lucy Kramer Cohen contributed to the research and drafting of the Handbook, writing several chapters without receiving credit.

Felix Cohen died in 1953 at the age of 46. Lucy Kramer Cohen raised their two daughters while continuing to work full-time for various government agencies. In addition to her work at the Department of the Interior, she worked for the Department of Agriculture, National War Labor Board, Department of Labor, and Public Health Service. She also served as a researcher and speechwriter for Helen Gahagan Douglas, a California Congresswoman who ran for the U.S. Senate in 1950.

Kramer Cohen was involved with various political causes and organizations throughout her life, including the League for Industrial Democracy, the Association on American Indian Affairs, and the Socialist Party of the USA. In the 1950s, she was the subject of a loyalty investigation during the Second Red Scare.

== Later life ==
Kramer Cohen officially retired from government service in 1977 but continued to work on annual contracts until 1989. In her later life, she became an artist and worked closely with Italian-American artist Pietro Lazzari. She died in 2007 after suffering a stroke.
