= Upstate Citizens for Equality =

American citizens' rights group

Upstate Citizens for Equality (UCE) was a citizens' rights group based in Verona, New York, that opposed Oneida Indian Nation (OIN) land claims, the Turning Stone Resort Casino, the OIN's application to the US Interior Department to place 13,000 acres (53 km^{2}) into federal trust, OIN sovereignty, and what it viewed as flawed federal Indian policy. The group organized protests at the OIN's gas stations and casino condemning OIN's sovereign status and unique relationship with the US government and New York State.

== Legal actions ==
UCE and some individual members filed several legal actions to further UCE's goals, including several failed challenges to the OIN's land claim. UCE challenged the validity of the 1993 tribal-state gaming compact between the Oneidas and New York State that Turning Stone Casino & Resort operates under. UCE and some individual members also challenged the OIN's application to have land taken into trust under the Indian Reorganization Act of 1934. Judge Kahn dismissed UCE's complaints, including the failed theory that the IRA is unconstitutional, on the basis of longstanding and settled law on this issue. UCE appealed the dismissal to the US Second Circuit Court of Appeals, where the decision was affirmed.

== Criticism ==
It has been reported that every Native Nation located in the vicinity of New York State and other tribes represented by the United South and Eastern Tribes (USET) views UCE as an anti-Indian hate group. The article was published in Indian Country, which is now owned by the OIN. Though, the OIN condemned UCE long before purchasing the paper. The OIN had the most contact with this organization. The OIN were critical of UCE and its members. USET currently, and at the time of the adoption of this resolution was led by a representative of the Oneida Indian Nation of New York elected by the 24 Native Nation representatives. UCE countered that the OIN lodged accusations of racism in order to stifle the voice of those who oppose its policies. Non-Indians also charged UCE members as being a group of racists. UCE denied such accusations, despite its stated purpose.

In December 2006, UCE President David Vickers made a comment while speaking on a Syracuse, NY radio program that sparked allegations of racism. Mr. Vickers and WSYR talk show host Jim Reith were discussing the U.S. Supreme Court's refusal to hear an appeal from the New York State Court Appeals in Peterman v Pataki. The following is a snippet of the dialog that transpired during that show:

"We'll have to follow the legal channels," Vickers said. "We live in a modern society. These people can't be shot, so we have to try to do what we can legally."

Reith interrupted, "Not that you would want them shot."

"No, of course not," Vickers said. "But the kind of lawlessness that's taking place is absurd, and previous generations would not have tolerated their leadership doing things like this."

The National Congress of American Indians, which is made up of elected representatives of the overwhelming majority of Indian tribes, also condemned the UCE as a racist hate group; comparing UCE members to David Duke.

Gone is the obvious snarl of yesteryear; and no one wants to be too quick with accusations of racism, but is perhaps now the noose simply hiding behind a smile of civility and the claim of "nothing personal?" Ever since David Duke replaced his white robes for the legitimate veneer of suit and tie, organizations taking aim at peoples of color have become increasingly sophisticated. They are now much more cleverly attuned to image and language. It may not be racist in the sense of a KKK mob burning your house and lynching your men, but the clear outright call for the eradication of all the rights your ancestors retained for you, of everything that gives you identity and legal recognition, everything that gives your children and future generations an opportunity at economic justice in America, this is clearly a hostile intention, directed specifically at the destruction of Indian governments and, therefore, at the very existence of our peoples.
