= Oneida Indian Nation =

Federally recognized Indigenous nation in New York

Oneida Indian Nation of New York
Onyotaʼa꞉ká꞉ (Oneida)

Total population
- 1,000+ (2017)

Regions with significant populations
- Wisconsin

Languages
- English, Oneida

Religion
- Haudenosaunee mythology, Longhouse religion, Christianity

Related ethnic groups
- Oneida Nation of Wisconsin, Oneida Nation of the Thames, Oneida First Nation, other Haudenosaunee peoples

The Oneida Indian Nation (OIN; Oneida: Onyotaʼa꞉ká꞉) (/oʊˈnaɪdə/ oh-NY-də) is a federally recognized tribe of Oneida people in the United States. The tribe is headquartered in Verona, New York, where the tribe originated and held territory prior to European colonialism, and continues to hold territory today. They are Iroquoian-speaking people, and one of the original Five Nations of the Haudenosaunee, or Iroquois Confederacy.

The Oneida are known as "America's first allies" as they were the first Haudenosaunee nation, and one of the few, to support the American cause. Three other federally recognized Oneida tribes operate in locations where they migrated or were removed to during and after the American Revolutionary War: one in Wisconsin in the United States, and two in Ontario, Canada.

The OIN was a party to land claim suits against the state of New York for treaties and purchases it made after the American Revolutionary War without ratification by the United States Congress, as required under the US Constitution. The litigation covered complex issues related to trust lands, Class III gaming, property, and sales tax collection. The 2013 landmark agreement entered into on May 16, 2013, between Madison and Oneida Counties, the OIN, and the state resolved these issues.

Today, the Oneida Indian Nation maintains sovereignty over roughly 18,000 acres of land in Madison and Oneida County, New York where they operate a number of businesses under the 2013 landmark agreement between the OIN, the State of New York, and Madison and Oneida Counties. These businesses include a resort with a Class III gambling casino.

== Government ==
The tribe is headquartered in Verona, New York, and the national representative is Ray Halbritter. Halbritter has led the OIN since 1985, alongside Richard Chrisjohn; an additional leader. In 1993, the United States government formally recognized Halbritter as the OIN leader. The tribal council consists of 8 clan members.

Traditionally, the male council members are responsible for daily decisions. The Clan Mothers make long-term decisions. Tradition also requires national leaders and citizens to consider the impact on the next seven generations when making decisions.

=== OIN Court ===
The OIN has its own court system. The current presiding judges are the Honorable Robert G. Hurlbutt and the Honorable John J. Brunetti. The Court is governed by its own Rules of Civil Procedure, Rules of Criminal Procedure, Rules of Evidence, Rules of Debt Collection, and Rules of Peacemaking. The Court operates under the guidelines on traditional Oneida values of peaceful mediation and reconciliation.

=== OIN police department ===
The OIN has its own police department that coordinates with New York State, Madison and Oneida County, and local law enforcement. "Deputized by federal authority, the Oneida Nation Police Department was the first tribal police force in the U.S. to receive accreditation by the Commission on Accreditation for Law Enforcement Agencies and is a professionally trained law enforcement agency empowered by the sovereign authority of the Oneida Indian Nation." Gary Henderson is the current police chief.

=== Treaties ===
In addition to being a member of the nation of the 1794 Treaty of Canandaigua, the OIN is a member of the following treaties:

- Treaty of Amity Commerce and Navigation; known as the Jay Treaty
- Treaty with the Six Nations, 1784; known as the Veterans Treaty
- Treaty with the Six Nations, 1789; known as the Veterans Treaty
- Treaty with the Oneida, Etc., 1794; known as the Veterans Treaty

== Citizenship ==
The tribal council of the OIN has established the rules for citizenship: it requires documentation of at least 1/4 blood ancestry (equivalent to one grandparent) through the maternal line. The OIN and other Haudenosaunee nations have had a matrilineal kinship system, with descent and inheritance through the mother's line.

== Clans ==
The Oneida Indian Nation consists of three matrilineal clans: Turtle, Wolf, and Bear. Each OIN citizen belongs to one of these clans. A child is considered born into the mother's clan, and takes social status from her people.

=== Clan creation ===
Oral history states that clan names and the matrilineal kinship system came from a response to issues that arose during the Haudenosaunee mourning process. Before the clans' creation, the entire Oneida village would mourn after the death of a village member. This caused problems since important decisions were put on hold during the time of mourning. Village leaders were at a loss as to how to continue everyday life while observing mourning practices. A young villager proposed a solution to the leaders. He suggested sending three female elders to the nearby river and having them build a fire and spend the night. At dawn, the women would pray to the Creator and take notice of the first animal that approached the river. Once the women had seen an animal, they were to report back to the village leaders. The elders implemented the plan. Three women were sent to the river. Upon their return, one woman reported seeing a turtle. The second saw a wolf. The third woman saw bear. The village leaders named their clans Turtle, Wolf and Bear and determined clans would be passed down through the mother's line, since women have the Creator's gift to create life. After the clans were established, when there was a death in the village, only the members of the deceased person's clan would mourn. The members of a second clan would console them, and the members of the third clan would carry on village business.

== Businesses ==
The tribe set up Oneida Nation Enterprises, through which it operates a number of businesses in Central New York. As of 2013, it was the largest employer of the area, with approximately 5,000 jobs total. Business interests include:

=== Bingo and gasoline ===
In the early 1990s, the OIN opened a bingo hall. Ray Halbritter (Oneida), opened a gas station known as SavOn across the street. The cheaper gasoline made the gas station popular among the community.

Eventually the OIN bought SavOn and expanded it into multiple locations within the area. Today SavOn (or SāvOn) is a chain of gas stations and convenience stores in Oneida and Madison counties, owned and operated by the Oneida Indian Nation.

=== Casinos and resorts ===
The OIN owns several casinos. They opened first opening Turning Stone Casino & Resort in 1993. After the 2013 landmark settlement, the OIN opened the Yellow Brick Road Casino in 2015. They opened the Point Place Casino in Bridgeport, New York, in 2018.

==== Turning Stone Resort Casino ====
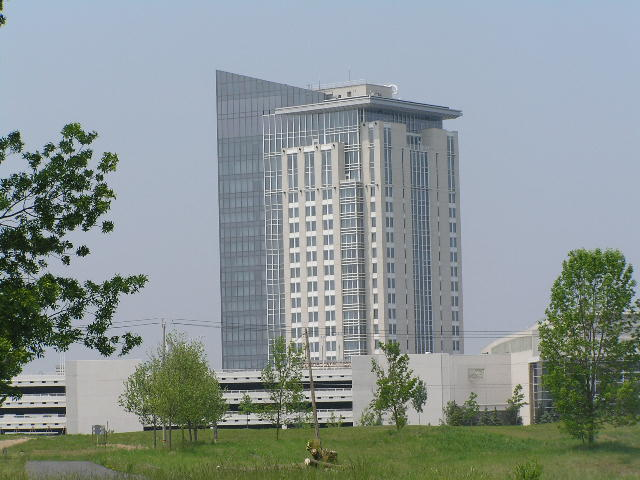
The Turning Stone Resort & Casino

The tribe's most profitable business is the Turning Stone Resort & Casino, which has been expanding continuously since its opening in 1993. The current game-space is approximately 100,000 square feet (9,300 m^{2}). Begun as a bingo hall, it has been developed as a large, Class III gaming facility and resort. The entertainment site includes nationally ranked hotels and restaurants. Many shows are performed throughout the year. The resort is the host for a fall Professional Golfers' Association (PGA) tournament. Some parties have challenged the tribal-state gaming compact between the OIN and New York state. The 2013 agreement between the OIN, Madison and Oneida Counties, and New York resolved all challenges to the casino.

In 2016, the casino and resort underwent a $20 million upgrade and renovation project to provide better smoke-free areas on the gambling floor, improve ventilation facilities, add a cafeteria, and add/upgrade rooms.

==== "Yellow Brick Road" Casino ====
In June 2015, the OIN opened a casino based on themes from the popular book and film, The Wizard of Oz, indirectly honoring writer L. Frank Baum, who was from Central New York. The facility is located in Tops Plaza, 800 W. Genesee St., Chittenango, NY and contains 67,000 square feet (6,200 m^{2}) of gaming space with over 400 slot machines; open 24/7. Table games are open Sunday-Thursday from 10am to 12am, and Friday & Saturday from 10am to 2am.

Other Native Americans have criticized this choice, as Baum was noted for supporting genocide against the Sioux Nation. The Washington Post noted that their choice was a problem, as Mr. Halbritter led the effort to force the Washington Redskins to change their name by dropping the reference to Native Americans because Mr. Halbritter believes it is derogatory to all Native Americans.

In recent years, the casino has since been renamed to the YBR Casino & Sports Book, as the company is making efforts to move away from the Wizard of Oz theme. New renovations include additional table games, a six-lane bowling alley, an indoor virtual driving range by Topgolf, and a large sportsbook area.

==== Point Place Casino ====
Located at 450 NY-31, Bridgeport, NY, this facility contains 65,000 square feet (6,000 m^{2}) of gaming space. It is the newest casino the Oneida Nation Enterprises operates and it is entirely smoke-free. Visitors can choose from over 500 slot machines and 20 classic table games. Table game hours are Sunday - Thursday 10am - 12am and Friday - Saturday 10am - 3am.

=== Other business ventures ===
The OIN has purchased a marina on the southeastern shore of Oneida Lake and many plots of land in the area.

The Indian Country Media Network (ICMN) was owned by the Oneida Nation of New York until 2017; it included the Indian Country Today online newspaper. That year the OIN donated the news organization's assets to the National Congress of American Indians (NCAI). The NCAI has continued to publish Indian Country Today online.

== OIN land litigation ==
Since the 1970s, the OIN have been involved in several lawsuits involving real property. In the 70s, the OIN filed suit seeking recovery of the original land grant contained in the 1794 Treaty of Canandaigua arguing the land was improperly transferred in violation of federal law and the US Constitution. As time progressed, the OIN began purchasing real property within this original grant as it became available. The OIN asserted its limited sovereignty status to claim the properties exempt from county and state property taxes. This culminated in several additional suits preceding the 2013 landmark agreement.

=== Land claim ===
In 1970 and 1974, the OIN, Oneida Nation of Wisconsin and the Oneida Nation of the Thames (Canada) filed lawsuits in the United States District Court for the Northern District of New York; they alleged that the reservation land granted to them by a treaty between the OIN and New York State was taken from the Oneida people (from their historic territory) and the treaty was never ratified by the Senate, making it unconstitutional. The state did not have authority under the US Constitution to deal directly with the Indian nations. The Oneida said that they still legally owned the lands in question.

In 1970, the OIN filed a "test" case in federal court, suing Oneida and Madison counties for two years' rent (1968-1969) on county-owned acreage; the rent amounted to $16,694. The OIN argue that as the original action by the state was unconstitutional, they still owned the land and were owed rent by the counties. The United States District Court for the Northern District of New York dismissed the action, and the OIN appealed. On July 12, 1972, the Second Circuit United States Court of Appeals affirmed the District Court's decision. The OIN petitioned the U.S. Supreme Court to grant certiorari In Oneida Indian Nation v. County of Oneida (1974), the Supreme Court decided in favor of the Oneida Indian Nation.

On July 12, 1977, on remand to the District Court with Judge Edmund Port presiding, the Court sided with the OIN. The counties appealed to the Second Circuit, which affirmed Judge Port's decision. The counties had argued the OIN did not have standing for its claim, and the claim was too old and should not be considered. The counties petitioned the U.S. Supreme Court for a writ of cert., which the court granted.

On March 4, 1985, the U.S. Supreme Court found in favor of the OIN in a 5 to 4 vote. The Court opined on three principles:

- that the OIN had a common-law right to sue in federal courts;
- that such claims were justiciable; and
- there was no state or federal statute of limitations that would bar such claims. The majority opinion includes the following footnote:

"The question whether equitable considerations should limit the relief available to the present day Oneida Indians was not addressed by the Court of Appeals or presented to this Court by petitioners. Accordingly, we express no opinion as to whether other considerations may be relevant to the final disposition of this case should Congress not exercise its authority to resolve these far-reaching Indian claims."

Justice John Paul Stevens wrote in his dissent:

"This decision upsets long-settled expectations in the ownership of real property in the Counties of Oneida and Madison, New York, and the disruption it is sure to cause will confirm the common law wisdom that ancient claims are best left in repose. The Court, no doubt, believes that it is undoing a grave historical injustice, but in so doing it has caused another, which only Congress may now rectify."

In 1998, the United States Department of Justice intervened in the lawsuits on the plaintiff's behalf in order for the claim to proceed against New York State because the state asserted its immunity under the 11th Amendment. Based on City of Sherrill v. Oneida Indian Nation and Cayuga Indian Nation v New York, the Defendants moved for summary judgment. On May 21, 2007, Judge Kahn dismissed the OIN's possessory land claims and allowed the non-possessory claims to proceed.

Both parties appealed Judge Kahn's decision. In a decision dated August 9, 2010, the Second Circuit opined that the non-possessory claims could not proceed and remanded the case back to the district court to enter a judgement in favor of the State and Counties. The OIN appealed to the US Supreme Court.

=== Status of former tribal lands re-acquired on the open market ===
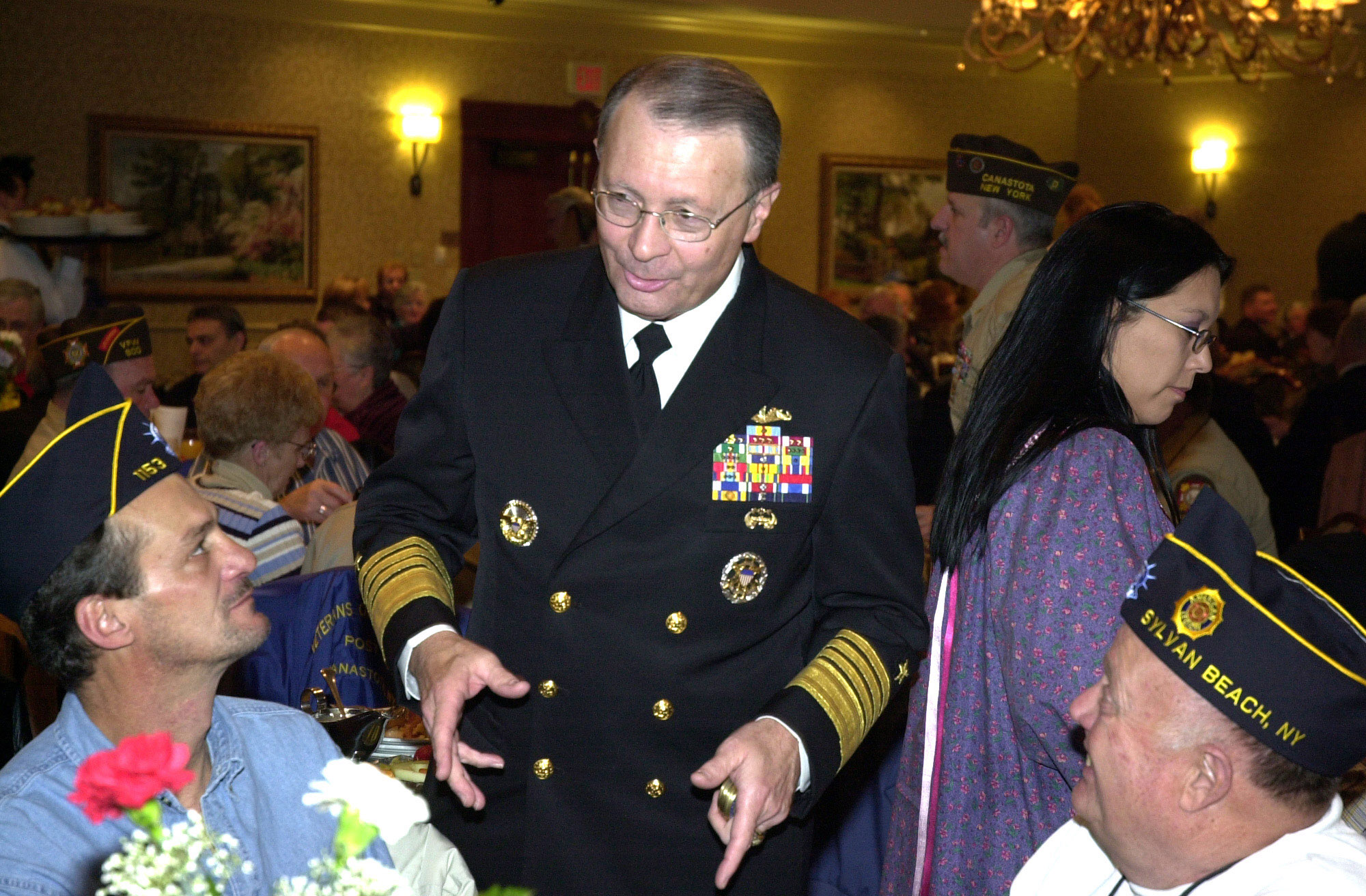
Joint Chiefs of Staff Vice Chairman, Navy Adm. Edmund Giambastiani speaks with attendees of the Oneida Indian Nation veterans recognition ceremony in Verona, N.Y, November 4, 2006

The OIN has purchased lands which had been part of its historic reservation, as established by treaty with New York State. These had later been sold to the state and subsequently to non-Indians. For some time, the OIN and the state believed that the OIN's purchase of the land restored the property to its status as Indian Territory under Oneida possession.

State law prohibits Class III gaming facilities. The OIN developed its resort and casino on what was understood to be its federal reservation, where that action was authorized under tribal sovereignty.

The city of Sherrill challenged the OIN by trying to collect property taxes on the land the tribe bought in that jurisdiction, where it developed its casino. In City of Sherrill v. Oneida Indian Nation, US Supreme Court Justice Ginsburg determined that the land the casino is on was part of the original tribal lands. (Note: 544 US 197 [2005]) But, Justice Ginsburg held that although the land may be part of an ancient reservation land grant, as the OIN had not controlled it for more than 200 years, during which time it was non-Indian territory, the tribe could not re-establish its immunity (from state law) over those lands.

To "re-establish sovereign authority" over ancient tribal lands which the Oneida had re-acquired on the open market, the U.S. Supreme Court said that the "proper avenue" for the Oneida Indian Nation was through § 465 of the Indian Reorganization Act. The OIN needed to apply to the Department of the Interior to place the disputed lands into federal trust. (Note: 544 US 197, 217-221 [2005])

Comments on the court decision varied. The issue in Sherrill was whether the city could levy property taxes on OIN's re-acquired tribal lands. The US Supreme Court determined that the City of Sherrill could levy property taxes. But the court failed to overturn the Second Circuit's finding that the land qualified as Indian Territory.

OIN supporters argued that Sherrill stands only to say that the OIN cannot re-instate its tax immunity, but that the land is Indian Land. UCE and its supporters disagreed; they countered that the Sherrill ruling provided a blanket approval for the jurisdictions to foreclose on all OIN property that owe back taxes. Some UCE members interpreted the ruling as making the OIN casino operation illegal under state law, and speculated that it should be closed until the state and the OIN reach a new agreement on gaming.

=== Land trust application ===
In April 2005, the OIN applied to the Department of Interior to have this land taken into federal trust on its behalf. By letter dated June 10, 2005, Associate Deputy Secretary Cason advised Ray Halbritter, the tribe's lead on this issue, of its position:

"Department of Interior’s ("DOI") position with respect to certain issues related to the status of OIN lands ... we do not agree with [the] assertion that the Court’s ruling in Sherrill recognizes the continuation of restriction on alienation protections over recently re-acquired lands ... it is our opinion that Court in City of Sherrill unmistakably held that the lands at issue (property interests purchased by OIN on the open market) are subject to real property taxes. In the event these taxes are not paid, we believe such lands are subject to foreclosure. Further, please be advised that the BIA is in the process of taking appropriate action to clarify that its recordation of OIN deeds does not have the legal effect of designating these lands as restricted against alienation pursuant to 25 USC 177."

In order to accept the lands as federal trust property, the BIA had to prepare an environmental assessment of the action. On February 27, 2008, the BIA released its Final Environmental Impact Statement (EIS) on taking the lands in question into trust on behalf of the OIN. It recommended that 13,084 acres (20.444 mi^{2}; 52.95 km^{2}) be placed into trust. After this announcement, the DOI gave a 30-day comment period and announced that it would have a decision on or after March 25, 2008.

Some government officials expressed concern about creating a "patchwork of taxable and tax-exempt properties," making a "jurisdictional nightmare." However, a sting operation conducted in conjunction with OIN Police and the Oneida County Sheriff disproved this argument.

In opposing the OIN's land-into-trust application, New York State raised the question of whether the Indian Reorganization Act (IRA) applies to the OIN, as the OIN had rejected reorganizing according to its rules, by a vote of 12 to 57 on June 17, 1936. According to the letter from Richard Platkin, Counsel to the Governor, to Franklin Keel, citing Michael T. Smith's Memorandum to Director, Office of Indian Services, Bureau of Indian Affairs, dated February 24, 1982, "the Oneida were considered not eligible, but in a reconsideration based on the discussion in the case of 'US v Boylan', the Department of Interior changed its position and conducted the referendum."

The OIN have noted that, as early as 1910, they have been a federally recognized tribe. The OIN is part of the original Oneida tribe that was party to the 1794 Treaty of Canadaigua. In unrelated cases involving other Indian tribes and whether the IRA applied to them, the BIA issued a ruling that the fact that a tribe conducted a vote related to reorganizing under the IRA, was sufficient to establish that an Indian Tribe was under federal jurisdiction in 1934. A 1980 BIA memorandum determined that the phrase "recognized tribe now under federal jurisdiction" includes tribes that existed in 1934 and had a continuing course of dealing with the United States or some other legal obligation. To this day, the United States honors its legal obligations to the OIN under the 1794 Treaty of Canandaigua. Any flawed claim that the OIN is not a federally recognized tribe was unequivocally debunked in the US Second Circuit Court of Appeals decision in 2016, where the Court affirmed, inter alia, that the OIN is an Indian Tribe within the meaning of the IRA.

On December 23, 2013, the BIA issued an amendment to its 2008 record of decision, accepting 13,082 acres into federal trust. In that amendment, the BIA unequivocally determined that the Indian Reorganization Act of 1934 is applicable to the OIN not only by virtue of the vote held, but also by the Boylan litigation, the 1794 Treaty of Canadaigua, and the historical record. As noted below, New York State, and Oneida and Madison Counties have agreed to this decision's validity and discontinued any legal challenge, in perpetuity.

In March 2008, County Executive Anthony Picente held a public meeting to discuss the possibility of negotiating a settlement before the March 25 deadline. Congressman Arcuri tried to stall the decision by seeking to block such a settlement through legislation. While criticized by both sides for killing any progress made between the two sides, Arcuri said he wanted to encourage negotiations.

In January 2008, Halbritter sent a proposed settlement offer to the state and the county, but did not receive a response before DOI announced its decision. The OIN offered to negotiate an agreement pertaining to future trust applications, but the state and local governments have not responded.

On May 20, 2008, the DOI announced that it would take 13,004 acres (20.319 mi^{2}; 52.63 km^{2}) into trust. The OIN offered to negotiate and settle the issues involved, while the state and county officials promised continued litigation.

On or about June 17, 2008, two groups filed separate lawsuits in federal court challenging the DOI's decision. UCE's suit challenged the DOI's authority to take the land into trust under the Indian Reorganization Act of 1934, alleging that this trust decision violates the United States Constitution. The other group alleged that the DOI's decision was arbitrary and capricious because some of the trust land is subject to outstanding litigation between the group and the OIN.

On June 19, 2008 (the deadline to file suit), New York State, Oneida and Madison counties filed their suits in federal court. The state and county governments' arguments were similar to those of UCE. The opposing parties alleged that the DOI's decision violates the United States constitution and that the DOI's decision was arbitrary.

By letter dated January 7, 2009, Steven Miskinis, Esq. of the U.S. Department of Justice notified the Court that the U.S. has taken 18 acres (0.028 mi^{2}; 73,000 m^{2}; 0.073 km^{2}) of land known as the former United States Air Force Space Command Complex at the Verona Research Facility, Germany Road, Verona, New York into trust for the OIN. Two days later, the Assistant Attorney General for the State of New York objected to this action. He requested an expedited conference and asked that the United States voluntarily refrain from any further efforts to transfer land into trust for the OIN. Judge Kahn dismissed UCE's complaint, including the failed theory that the IRA is unconstitutional, on the basis of longstanding and settled law on this issue.

As detailed below, on May 16, 2013, New York Governor Andrew Cuomo, Oneida County Executive Anthony Picente, Madison County Board of Supervisors Chairman John Becker, and Oneida Indian Nation leader Ray Halbritter announced a deal that settled all of their differences. Before the deal became effective, the majority of each government's legislative branches had to approve it. The key components of the agreement are as follows:

1. The OIN will pay 25% of its profits from its new slot machines to the state;
2. The State agrees to allow a maximum of 25,000 acres (39 mi^{2}; 100 km^{2}) to be placed into federal trust;
3. The OIN will have exclusive gaming rights within a 10-county region;
4. All pending litigation will be withdrawn; and
5. The OIN will charge its own sales tax on cigarettes and gas sales made to non-Indian purchasers, to be paid to the state. Of the 25% revenue that the state will receive, it will give half to the governments of Oneida and Madison counties.

== Issues ==
The OIN has both internal and external opposition. Internally, members of the Wolf Clan in particular protest Halbritter's assumption of power and dissolving of the traditional Oneida government, which was based on hereditary leaders for life.

=== Internal governance issues ===
Shenandoah v. United States DOI was a lawsuit that challenged the legitimacy and authority of Ray Halbritter to act on behalf of the OIN. Specifically,

"In 1977, members of the Oneida Nation appointed Halbritter and two other Nation members as interim representatives of the Nation. On April 25, 1993, the Grand Council, consisting of representatives from all six Haudenosaunee nations, including the Oneida Nation, purported to remove Halbritter from his position as interim Nation representative. The Department [of Interior] acknowledged the removal on August 10, 1993, but the next day stayed its acknowledgment pending BIA review. After requesting the Nation to conduct a referendum to select a representative, the Department agreed to Halbritter's proposal to submit "statements of support" from Nation members. On February 4, 1994, the Department notified Halbritter that it would continue to recognize him as the Nation's permanent representative until such time as he resigned or was removed by the Nation in accordance with certain procedures. According to plaintiffs, on May 21, 1995, the Nation once again removed Halbritter from his position as Oneida representative. Although informed of Halbritter's alleged second removal, the Department had not acted upon that notification by the time of oral argument, and as of the time of this opinion, we have received no information to the contrary."

The district court granted the defendants' motions to dismiss both the non-habeas and habeas claims of the plaintiffs. The Second Circuit Court of Appeals affirmed the judgment of the district court.

=== External issues ===
External opposition comes from organizations such as Upstate Citizens for Equality (UCE), a now-disbanded group that opposed Haudenosaunee land claims in upstate New York. UCE also opposed the OIN being able to operate its enterprises tax-free on land it asserted sovereign status. These issues were resolved by the 2013 landmark agreement.

==== Tax issues ====
Disputes have arisen with the state over the OIN's economic advantage of operating the Class III gaming facility without having to collect or pay state taxes on retail sales at the resort. The tribe does pay a portion of the revenues to the state under the gaming compact (essentially in lieu of taxes). The OIN and other parties believed operations on property it controlled were tax free. City of Sherrill v. Oneida Indian Nation.

Vernon Downs opened a casino to try to compete with Turning Stone. Prior to February 2008, the racino was heavily taxed under state law. Vernon Downs struggled to operate and, in late 2007, many of the original investors pulled out of the venture. The Upstate Citizens for Equality and supporters attributed to the OIN being able to operate its casino tax free.

OIN supporters attribute Vernon Downs's troubles to the state collecting a total of 54% of the revenue in taxes (50% to the state education fund and 4% sales tax), making profitability difficult. On February 11, 2008, Director Steve Gural closed down the racino at Vernon Downs for three days. He was trying to make the state decrease its rate of taxation of the facility, to enable it to be more profitable.[8] This period of closure cost the state approximately $1.5 million in lost tax revenues. (The state has earmarked revenues from gambling for education, which was part of the original campaign to have voters approve the state's authorization of gaming activities.)[8] Many argued that the state should not call this "lost revenue." Building the track created the revenue; without the track, there would be no revenue. The track was facing insolvency.

The OIN asserted that it made up for this lack of land tax by donating to local schools in amounts that exceed the taxes which the county would normally receive from the land plots, in a program known as the Silver Covenant Chain Education Grants. As tensions increased between the various local governments, the state government, and the OIN, the OIN decreased or stopped the donations.

Stockbridge Valley School has several OIN children as students, but the OIN has discontinued grants to the school because it disapproved of the views of one teacher. In late fall 2003, an OIN representative contacted the Stockbridge Valley Community School District and advised that it would not make the Silver Covenant unless a particular teaching assistant was fired.

Cayuga Indian Nation of New York v Gould is a case brought on the issue of whether federally recognized Indian Tribes, such as the OIN, have to collect state sales taxes from retail sales to non-Indian consumers made within their reservation. According to the Court of Appeals in Gould, the Indian Tribe is not subject to State tax law. For purposes of the State Tax Law, the Nation's retail operations on its lands, even if reacquired on the open market, are not subject to state tax law.

=== Potential pact between Oneida County and the OIN in 2009 ===
On May 8, 2009, Anthony Picente, Oneida County Executive, announced a pact between Oneida County and the OIN. The Oneida County Board of Legislators and the State legislature would have had to approve this pact within the next 60 days. If this pact had been approved, the OIN would have paid $55 million to Oneida County over the next 10 years, beginning with a $30 million lump sum payment the same year. Additionally, the OIN would have made make Silver Covenant Grants for the next five years, in order to apply for more trust land without county opposition. In return for this, the county would have agreed to drop its lawsuits and satisfy all pending tax lien and tax foreclosure proceedings. The OIN would have agreed to impose a sales tax on all businesses situated on its lands equal to Oneida County's sales tax rate. This OIN sales tax would have been imposed on all non-Indian patrons as well as tribal members.

The pact would have required the Oneida County Sheriff and the OIN Police Department to negotiate a law enforcement pact to settle questions of jurisdictional authority and operations. On May 27, 2009, the County Board of Legislators rejected the proposed pact, citing many reasons for rejecting the proposed agreement.

== 2013 landmark agreement between New York State, Madison and Oneida Counties, and the OIN ==
On May 16, 2013, Governor Andrew Cuomo announced that the OIN reached a settlement agreement between the state, and Oneida and Madison counties. The agreement resolved multiple legal issues between the parties. Pursuant to the agreement, the OIN would pay 25% of its revenue to the State, a quarter of which is paid to Oneida County and Madison County. These monies are to offset any property and sales taxes the Counties would otherwise receive if the property remained on the tax rolls.

The State and Madison and Oneida counties agree to withdraw their objections to the OIN's numerous land-trust applications, with a cap of 25,000 acres (39 mi^{2}; 100 km^{2}) that could ultimately be transferred into trust by the U.S. Federal Government. According to the agreement, all of the (potential total) 25,000 acres of OIN trust land would be within the physical boundaries of the reservation of the Oneida Nation as described in Article II of the Treaty of Canandaigua, 7 Stat. 44 (1794). At the time of the 2013 Agreement, 4,366 acres of land were held in trust for the Nation. However, given that the State and Madison and Oneida counties agreed to withdraw their objections to the OIN's land-trust applications as part of the settlement, the OIN's applications were granted, therefore, the agreement effectively transferred an additional 13,004 acres of land to trust for the OIN, bringing the OIN's total trust land to 17,370 acres. As of 2022, the OIN has roughly 18,000 acres in trust.

The OIN will have a 10-county (Oneida, Madison, Onondaga, Cayuga, Herkimer, Oswego, Cortland, Chenango, Otsego, and Lewis counties) geographic gambling monopoly. The OIN will implement a sales tax system to tax products sold to non-Indians on Indian Territory, such as cigarettes. And the agreement would terminate all related litigation between the OIN, the state, and Madison and Oneida Counties. This agreement required the State Legislature, the Oneida County and Madison County Boards of Legislators, the US Department of the Interior, and the Judiciary to ratify this agreement.

On May 28, 2013, the Oneida County Board of Legislators approved the agreement in a 16–13 vote. On May 29, 2013, New York State, through Governor Cuomo, signed the agreement. On May 30, 2013, the Madison County Board of Supervisors approved the agreement in a weighted vote of 847–653. On January 1, 2014, the US Department of the Interior approved of the agreement. On June 22, 2013, both the state Senate (48-11) and the state Assembly (83-44) approved the agreement. The final entity to approve the agreement was the Judiciary. On March 4, 2014, US District Court Judge Kahn approved the settlement agreement. On September 4, 2014, the 13,000 acres (20 mi^{2}; 53 km^{2}) of OIN real property was formally transferred into US trust.

On August 19, 2013, the Towns of Vernon and Verona jointly filed a lawsuit to oppose the ratified settlement, citing a violation of their freedom of speech and equal protection. On October 30, 2013, US District Court Judge Kahn remanded the lawsuit to the state court system because the towns lacked standing. On June 27, 2014, Albany County Supreme Court denied and dismissed the lawsuit.

=== OIN revenue sharing agreement ===
Oneida County offered an OIN revenue sharing agreement with at least five municipalities affected most by the 2013 landmark agreement. The five municipalities offered this deal are the City of Sherrill, Town of Sylvan, Town of Verona, Village of Vernon, and Town of Augusta. On May 27, 2014, the Sherrill City Commission voted 3–1 to accept $160,000 annually from Oneida County, in exchange for the current commission and future commissions waiving their right to challenge the settlement. On May 29, 2014, the Vernon Village Board unanimously agreed to receive annual payments of $60,000 from Oneida County in exchange for the current board and future boards waiving their right to challenge the settlement. On June 7, 2014, the Town of Augusta accepted an agreement with Oneida County. By a 3–1 vote, the town will receive $107,500 a year as compensation for lost property tax revenue based on OIN trust lands.

Since then, several other municipalities and school districts have requested to become part of the OIN revenue sharing agreement. However, to do this, Oneida County is trying to undo its agreements with the prior municipalities in order to do a new agreement that covers all of the affected municipalities. This has drawn strong opposition from the original municipalities that accepted the initial agreement.

== Notable Oneida Indian Nation people ==
- Arthur Raymond Halbritter, representative of the Oneida Indian Nation and CEO of Oneida Nation Enterprises
- Emma Camp Mead (1866–1934), hotelkeeper and herbalist at Indian Lake, New York
- Joanne Shenandoah (1957–2021), award-winning singer and performer
- Mary Cornelius Winder, 1898–1954, activist for land claim

== See also ==
- Oneida people
- Oneida Nation of Wisconsin
- Oneida Nation of the Thames
- Six Nations of the Grand River
- Washington Redskins name controversy
