= Indian Reorganization Act =

United States Law

- Other short titles: Indian New Deal; Indian Reorganization Act of 1934
- Long title: An Act to conserve and develop Indian lands and resources; to extend to Indians the right to form business and, other organizations; to establish a credit system for Indians; to grant certain rights of home rule to Indians; to provide for vocational education for Indians; and for other purposes.
- Nicknames: Wheeler–Howard Act
- Enacted by: the 73rd United States Congress
- Effective: June 18, 1934

Citations
- Public law: Pub. L. 73–383
- Statutes at Large: 48 Stat. 984

Codification
- Titles amended: 25 U.S.C.: Indians
- U.S.C. sections created: 25 U.S.C. ch. 14, subch. V § 461 et seq.

Legislative history
- Introduced in the Senate as S. 3645 by Burton K. Wheeler (D-MT) on May 22, 1934; Passed the Senate on June 12, 1934 (passed); Passed the House on June 15, 1934 (284-101); Reported by the joint conference committee on June 15, 1934; agreed to by the Senate on June 16, 1934 (agreed) and by the House on June 16, 1934 (agreed); Signed into law by President Franklin D. Roosevelt on June 18, 1934

The Indian Reorganization Act (IRA) of June 18, 1934, or the Wheeler–Howard Act, was U.S. federal legislation that dealt with the status of American Indians in the United States. It was the centerpiece of what has been often called the "Indian New Deal".

The Act also restored to Indians the management of their assets—land and mineral rights—and included provisions intended to create a sound economic foundation for the residents of Indian reservations. Total U.S. spending on Indians averaged $38 million a year in the late 1920s, dropping to an all-time low of $23 million in 1933, and reaching $38 million in 1940.

The IRA was the most significant initiative of John Collier, who was President Franklin D. Roosevelt's Commissioner of the Bureau of Indian Affairs (BIA) from 1933 to 1945. He had long studied Indian issues and worked for change since the 1920s, particularly with the American Indian Defense Association. He intended to reverse the assimilationist policies that had resulted in considerable damage to American Indian cultures and to provide a means for American Indians to re-establish sovereignty and self-government, reduce the losses of reservation lands, and build economic self-sufficiency. He believed that Indian traditional culture was superior to that of modern America and thought it worthy of emulation. His proposals were highly controversial, as numerous powerful interests had profited from the sale and management of Native lands. Congress revised Collier's proposals and preserved oversight of tribes and reservations by the Bureau of Indian Affairs within the Department of Interior. Felix S. Cohen and Lucy Kramer Cohen, officials at the Department of the Interior Solicitor's Office, were also significant architects of the Indian New Deal who helped draft the 1934 act.

The self-government provisions would automatically go into effect for a tribe unless a clear majority of the eligible Indians voted it down.

== History ==
=== Background ===
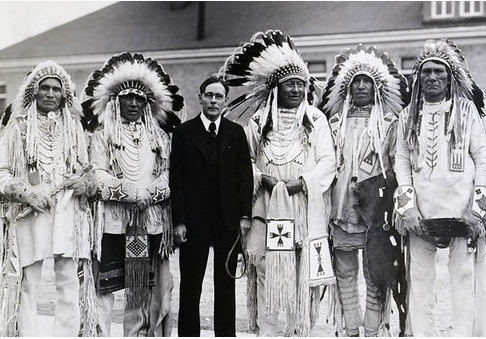
Collier in a 1934 meeting with South Dakota Blackfoot Indian chiefs to discuss the Wheeler-Howard Act.

The process of allotment started with the General Allotment Act of 1887. By 1934, two-thirds of Indian land had converted to traditional private ownership (i.e., it was owned in fee simple). Most of that had been sold by Indian allottees, often because they could not pay local taxes on the lands they were newly responsible for. The IRA provided a mechanism for the recovery of land that had been previously sold, including land that had been sold to tribal Indians. They would lose individual property under the law.

John Collier was appointed Commissioner of the Indian Bureau (it is now called the Bureau of Indian Affairs, BIA) in April 1933 by President Franklin Delano Roosevelt. He had the full support of his boss, Secretary of the Interior Harold L. Ickes, who was also an expert on Indian issues.

The federal government held land in trust for many tribes. Numerous claims cases had been presented to Congress because of failures in the government's management of such lands. There were particular grievances and claims due to the government's failure to provide for sustainable forestry. The Indian Claims Act of 1946 included a requirement that the Interior Department manage Indian forest resources "on the principle of sustained-yield management." Representative Edgar Howard of Nebraska, co-sponsor of the Act and Chairman of the House Committee on Indian Affairs, explained that the purpose of the provision was "to assure a proper and permanent management of the Indian Forest" under modern sustained-yield methods to "assure that the Indian forests will be permanently productive and will yield continuous revenues to the tribes."

=== Implementation and results ===
The act slowed the practice of allotting communal tribal lands to individual tribal members. It did not restore to Indians land that had already been patented to individuals. However, much land at that time was still unallotted or allotted to an individual but still held in trust for that individual by the U.S. government. Because the Act did not disturb existing private ownership of Indian reservation lands, it left reservations as a checkerboard of tribal or individual trust and fee land, which remains the case today.

However, the Act also allowed the U.S. to purchase some of the fee land and restore it to tribal trust status. Due to the Act and other federal courts and government actions, more than two million acres (8,000 km^{2}) of land were returned to various tribes in the first 20 years after passage.

In 1954, the United States Department of the Interior (DOI) began implementing the termination and relocation phases of the Act, which had been added by Congress. These provisions resulted from the continuing interest of some members of Congress in having American Indians assimilate into the majority society. Among other effects, termination resulted in the legal dismantling of 61 tribal nations within the United States and ending their recognized relationships with the federal government. This also ended the eligibility of the tribal nations and their members for various government programs to assist American Indians. Of the "Dismantled Tribes" 46 regained their legal status as indigenous communities.

=== Constitutional challenges ===
Since the late 20th century and the rise of Indian activism over sovereignty issues, as well as many tribes' establishment of casino gambling on reservations as a revenue source, the U.S. Supreme Court has been repeatedly asked to address the IRA's constitutionality. A controversial provision of the Act allows the U.S. government to acquire non-Indian land (by voluntary transfer) and convert it to Indian land ("take it into trust"). In doing so, the U.S. government partially removes the land from the state's jurisdiction, allowing activities like casino gambling on the land for the first time. It also exempts the land from state property and other state taxes. Consequently, many state or local governments opposed the IRA and filed lawsuits challenging its constitutionality.

In 1995, South Dakota challenged the authority of the Interior Secretary, under the IRA, to take 91 acres (370,000 m^{2}) of land into trust on behalf of the Lower Brule Sioux Tribe (based on the Lower Brule Indian Reservation) in South Dakota v. United States Dep't of the Interior, 69 F.3d 878, 881-85 (8th Cir. 1995). The Eighth Circuit Court of Appeals found Section 5 of the IRA to be unconstitutional, ruling that it violated the nondelegation doctrine and that the Secretary of Interior did not have the authority to take the land into trust.

The U.S. Department of the Interior (DOI) sought a U.S. Supreme Court review. But, as DOI was implementing new regulations related to land trusts, the agency asked the Court to remand the case to the lower court for reconsideration with the decision based on the new regulations. The U.S. Supreme Court granted the DOI's petition, vacated the lower court's ruling, and remanded the case back to the lower court.

Justices Antonin Scalia, Sandra Day O'Connor, and Clarence Thomas dissented, stating that "[t]he decision today—to grant, vacate, and remand in light of the Government's changed position—is both unprecedented and inexplicable." They went on, "[W]hat makes today's action inexplicable as well as unprecedented is the fact that the Government's change of legal position does not even purport to be applicable to the present case." Seven months after the Supreme Court's decision to grant, vacate, and remand, the DOI removed the land in question from trust.

In 1997, the Lower Brulé Sioux submitted an amended trust application to the DOI, requesting that the United States take the 91 acres (370,000 m^{2}) of land into trust on the Tribe's behalf. South Dakota challenged this in 2004 in district court, which upheld DOI's authority to take the land in trust. The state appealed to the Eighth Circuit, but when the court reexamined the constitutionality issue, it upheld the constitutionality of Section 5 in agreement with the lower court. The U.S. Supreme Court denied the State's petition for certiorari. Since then, district and circuit courts have rejected claims of non-delegation by states. The Supreme Court refused to hear the issue in 2008.

In 2008 (before the U.S. Supreme Court heard the Carcieri case below), in MichGO v Kempthorne, Judge Janice Rogers Brown of the D.C. Circuit Court of Appeals wrote a dissent stating that she would have struck down key provisions of the IRA. Of the three circuit courts to address the IRA's constitutionality, Judge Brown is the only judge to dissent on the IRA's constitutionality. The majority opinion upheld its constitutionality. The U.S. Supreme Court did not accept the MichGO case for review, thus keeping the previous precedent in place. Additionally, the First, Eighth, and Tenth Circuits of the U.S. Court of Appeals have upheld the constitutionality of the IRA.

In 2008, Carcieri v Kempthorne was argued before the U.S. Supreme Court; the Court ruled on it in 2009, with the decision called Carcieri v. Salazar. In 1991, the Narragansett Indian tribe bought 31 acres (130,000 m^{2}) of land. They requested that the DOI take it into trust, which the agency did in 1998, thus exempting it from many state laws. The State was concerned that the tribe would open a casino or tax-free business on the land and sued to block the transfer. The state argued that the IRA did not apply because the Narragansett was not "now under federal jurisdiction" as of 1934, as distinguished from "federally recognized." In fact, the Narragansett had been placed under Rhode Island guardianship since 1709. In 1880, the tribe was illegally pressured into relinquishing its tribal authority to Rhode Island. Some historians disagree that the action was illegal because, although not sanctioned by Congress, it was "desired" by the tribe members. The tribe did not receive federal recognition until 1983, after the 1934 passage of the IRA. The U.S. Supreme Court agreed with the State.

In a challenge to the U.S. DOI's decision to take land into trust for the Oneida Indian Nation in present-day New York, Upstate Citizens for Equality (UCE), New York, Oneida County, Madison County, the town of Verona, the town of Vernon, and others argued that the IRA is unconstitutional. Judge Kahn dismissed UCE's complaint, including the failed theory that the IRA is unconstitutional, on the basis of longstanding and settled law on this issue. The U.S. Court of Appeals for the Second Circuit affirmed the dismissal.

=== Approval by tribes ===
Section 18 of the IRA required that members of the affected Indian nation or tribe vote on whether to accept it within one year of the effective date of the act (25 U.S.C. 478) and had to approve it by a majority. There was confusion about who should be allowed to vote on creating new governments, as many non-Indians lived on reservations and many Indians owned no land there, and also over the effect of abstentions. Under the voting rules, abstentions were counted as yes votes, but in Oglala Lakota culture, for example, abstention had traditionally equaled a no vote. The resulting confusion caused disputes on many reservations about the results. When the final results were in, 172 tribes had accepted the act, and 75 had rejected it. The largest tribe, the Navajo, had been badly hurt by the federal Navajo Livestock Reduction Program, which took away half their livestock and jailed dissenters. They strongly opposed the act, the chief promoter John Collier, and the entire Indian New Deal. Historian Brian Dippie notes that the Indian Rights Association denounced Collier as a "dictator" and accused him of a "near reign of terror" on the Navajo reservation. Dippie adds, "[h]e became an object of 'burning hatred' among the very people whose problems so preoccupied him."

Among the Lakota, traditionalists criticised the IRA for imposing an alien constitutional order by the government and local 'mixed-blood' peoples against the traditionalist population.

== Legacy ==
Historians have mixed reactions to the Indian New Deal. Many praise Collier's energy and his initiative. Kenneth R. Philp praised Collier's Indian New Deal for protecting Indian freedom to engage in traditional religious practices, obtaining additional relief money for reservations, providing a structure for self-government, and enlisting the help of anthropologists who respected traditional cultures. However, he concludes that the Indian New Deal was unable to stimulate economic progress, nor did it provide a usable structure for Indian politics. Philp argues these failures gave ammunition to the return to the previous policy of termination that took place after Collier resigned in 1945. In surveying the scholarly literature, E. A. Schwartz concludes that there is:

a near consensus among historians of the Indian New Deal that Collier temporarily rescued Indian communities from federal abuses and helped Indian people survive the Depression but also damaged Indian communities by imposing his own social and political ideas on them.

Collier's reputation among the Indians was mixed—praised by some, vilified by others. Though highly regarded by most Indian tribes he assisted, Collier antagonized the Navajo, the largest tribe, as well as the Seneca people, Iroquois, and many others. Some anthropologists criticized him for not recognizing the diversity of Native American lifestyles. Hauptman argues that his emphasis on Northern Pueblo arts and crafts and the uniformity of his approach to all tribes are partly explained by his belief that his tenure as Commissioner would be short, meaning that packaging large, lengthy legislative reforms seemed politically necessary. Despite being outspokenly critical of the American society's treatment of Indians, and also making a serious effort to increase art participation among Indians, Collier was also acknowledged for the vital effort he made to spread his own ideas about romanticism on tribes he assisted as well.

The Reorganization Act was wide-ranging legislation authorizing tribal self-rule under federal supervision, ending land allotment, and generally promoting measures to enhance tribes and encourage education.

Having described the American society as "physically, religiously, socially, and aesthetically shattered, dismembered, directionless", Collier was later criticized for his romantic views about the moral superiority of traditional society as opposed to modernity. Philp says after his experience at the Taos Pueblo, Collier "made a lifelong commitment to preserve tribal community life because it offered a cultural alternative to modernity....His romantic stereotyping of Indians often did not fit the reality of contemporary tribal life."

The act has helped conserve the communal tribal land bases. Collier supporters blame Congress for altering the legislation proposed by Collier, so that it has not been as successful as possible. On many reservations, its provisions exacerbated longstanding differences between traditionals and those who had adopted more European-American ways. Many Native Americans believe their traditional systems of government were better for their culture.

== See also ==
- New Deal for Aborigines, 1930s policy initiative in Australia
- Cultural assimilation of Native Americans
- Henry Roe Cloud
- Native Americans in the United States
- Navajo Livestock Reduction

== Sources ==
- Hauptman, Laurence (1979). "Alice Jemison ... Seneca Political Activist". The Indian Historian (Wassaja). 12 (July): 15–22, 60–62.
- Hauptman, Laurence (1988) [1981]. The Iroquois and the New Deal. Syracuse University Press. ISBN 0815624395.
- Wallis, Michael & Parsons, Jack (2001). Heaven's Window: A Journey Through Northern New Mexico. Graphic Arts Center Publishing Co. pp. 73 ff. ISBN 9781558685475.
