= Notah Begay III Foundation Challenge =

Golf tournament

The Notah Begay III Foundation Challenge, or NB3 Challenge, was a charity golf tournament played at Atunyote Golf Club at the Turning Stone Resort & Casino in Oneida, New York. All proceeds benefit the Notah Begay III Foundation for the creation and delivery of sustainable athletic programming for Native American youth.

== Notah Begay III Foundation ==
In 2005, Notah Begay III, a four-time PGA Tour winner and the first Native American PGA Tour player, established the Notah Begay III Foundation. It is a federally recognized 501(c)3 non-profit organization designed to provide sustainable health and wellness programs for Native American youth. Recognizing the lack of sustainable programming for youth within Tribal communities, Begay established the Foundation to deliver youth sports activities in tribal communities in the form of golf and soccer programs.

== Winners ==
Team event

- 2013 Team USA (Notah Begay III, Rickie Fowler, Bo Van Pelt, Gary Woodland)
- 2012 Team West (Notah Begay III, Rickie Fowler, Cristie Kerr, Lexi Thompson, Gary Woodland, Tiger Woods)

Year	Winner	Country	Score	Margin of victory	Runner(s)-up
Notah Begay III Foundation Challenge
2011	Cristie Kerr and Hunter Mahan	United States	-11 (61)	1 stroke	(United States) Rickie Fowler and (Sweden) Annika Sorenstam
2010	Cristie Kerr and Hunter Mahan	United States	-10 (60)	2 strokes	(United States) Rickie Fowler and (Sweden) Annika Sorenstam

Individual event

Year	Winner	Country	Skins ($)	Runner-up	Skins ($)
Notah Begay III Foundation Challenge
2009	Tiger Woods	United States	230,000	(Colombia) Camilo Villegas	200,000
2008	Camilo Villegas	Colombia	220,000	(Fiji) Vijay Singh	180,000
