= J.T. Barber School =

Historic school building in North Carolina, United States

- U.S. National Register of Historic Places
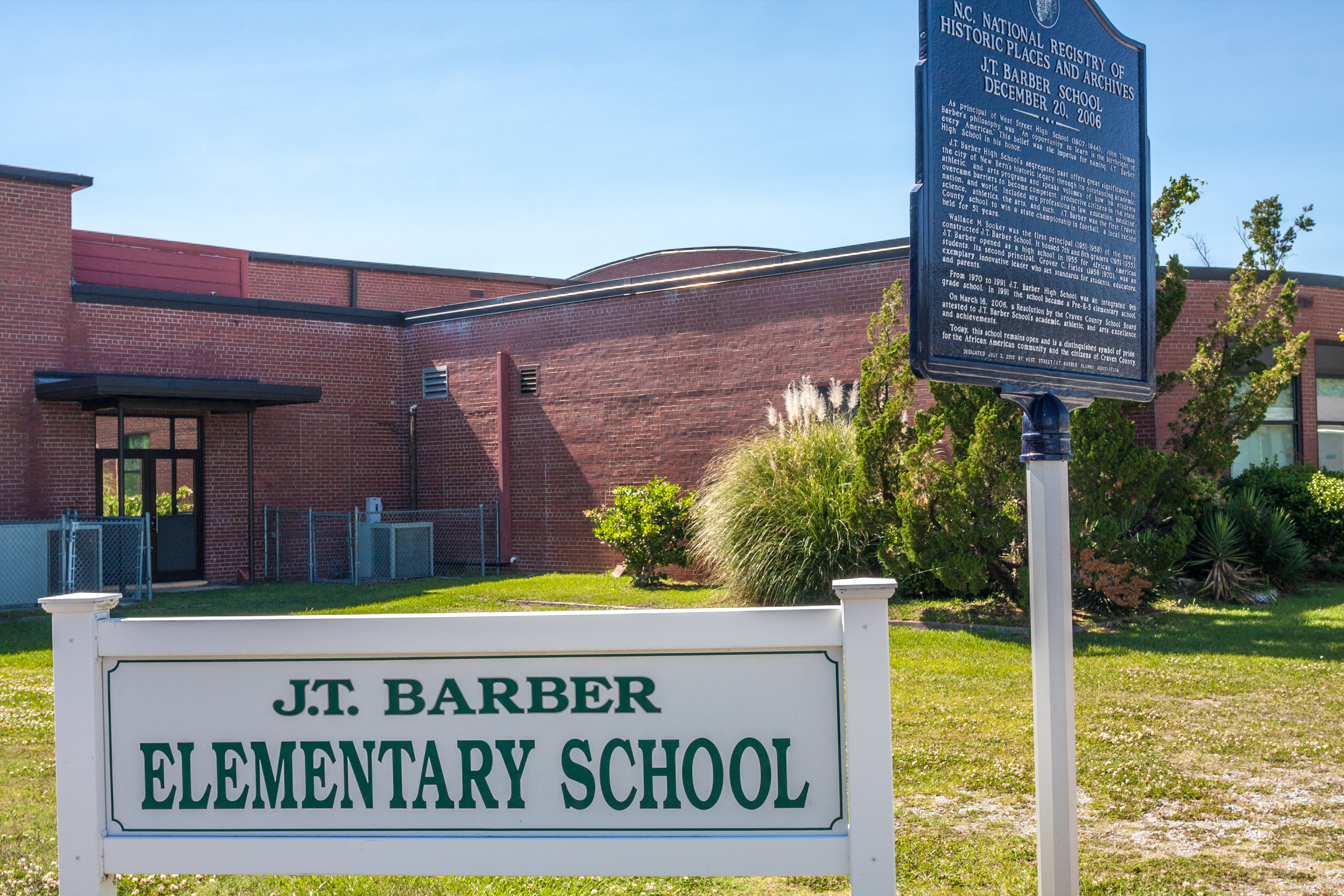
- J.T. Barber School, May 2013

- Location within North Carolina Location within the United States
- Location: 1700 Cobb St., New Bern, North Carolina
- Coordinates: 35°7′04″N 77°3′54″W
- Area: 11 acres (4.5 ha)
- Built: 1951-1955
- Architect: Fuson, Raymond
- Architectural style: Modern Movement
- NRHP reference No.: 06001139
- Added to NRHP: December 20, 2006

J.T. Barber School is a historic high school building for African-American students located at New Bern, Craven County, North Carolina. It was built in stages between 1951 and 1955, and is a one-story, flat roofed, concrete block school with brick veneer in the Modern style. The school consists of seven separate wings consisting of a cafeteria, a library, a gymnasium flanked on either side by classrooms, an auditorium and music room, and three additional classroom wings. Also on the property are contributing athletic fields. The school has also operated as a middle school and elementary school.

It was listed on the National Register of Historic Places in 2006.
