= Turning Stone Resort Casino =

Casino and Resort in Upstate New York, USA

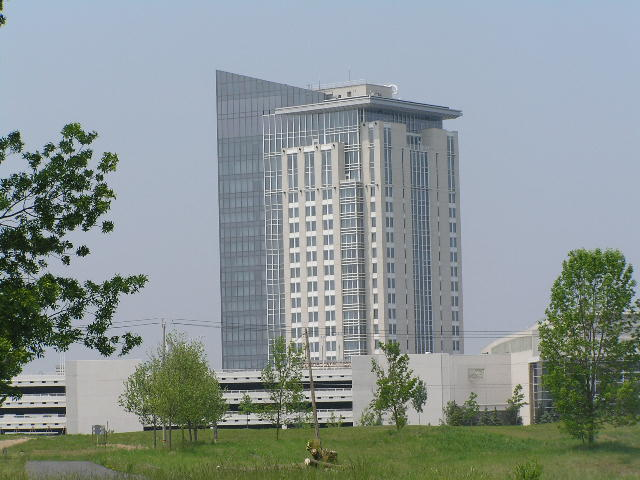

- Location in central New York
- Interactive map of Turning Stone Resort Casino
- Location: Verona, New York; 5218 Patrick Road; 43.115°N 75.589°W
- Opened: July 16, 1993; 33 years ago
- No. of rooms: 709 (across four hotels)
- Gaming space: 125,000 square foot Las Vegas-style gaming floor
- Signature attractions: PGA-quality golf course, spa, showroom, and 5,000-seat arena
- Notable restaurants: TS Steakhouse, Tin Rooster
- Casino type: Land-based
- Owner: Oneida Nation Enterprises
- Renovated in: 1997 (addition of hotel); 2004 (second hotel tower); 2010-2012 (renovation of existing hotel building)
- Website: turningstone.com

Turning Stone Resort Casino is a Native American resort casino owned and operated by the Oneida Indian Nation of New York (OIN) in Verona, New York.

The facility opened on July 20, 1993, and offers golf amenities (on- and off-site golf courses, one of PGA Tour quality, and an indoor golf dome), an RV park, trails for walking, an amusement arcade, many restaurants, spas, Bingo, Keno, table games, and many types of reel and video slot machines. Until the Seneca Niagara Casino opened in 2002, it was the only land-based casino in New York. Adjacent to exit 33 of the New York State Thruway, the resort is a popular tourist destination in central New York State and has received numerous awards in the industry.

== Construction and expansion ==
The casino, and associated hotel for visitors and conventions, was conceived as a revenue-generating enterprise to aid in economic and social development of the OIN. It was developed at a time when Native American sovereignty and the right to establish gaming casinos on reservations had survived court challenges. Development of the casino was opposed from within and outside the OIN. As a fall-back plan, the OIN had the casino designed so that it could be adapted as a small shopping mall, if necessary. Ultimately, the OIN decided not to add a shopping mall because online shopping has diminished patronage to shopping malls.

The land upon which the casino is located was acquired from Ibrahim Batca and his family in two transactions in 1992 and 1993. Construction of an on-site hotel and a bingo hall began in 1994. The Bingo Hall's construction was completed in 1995. Disagreements over the hotel plans delayed its construction for a year. The hotel's original design plans had the hotel and casino separate, connected only by an outdoor walkway. Because of the delay, the hotel plans were re-designed to combine the hotel and casino into one structure. This new design allowed the Oneida Indian Nation to offer more services, including a pool, a spa, and a gym. Additionally, the combination created a larger and more formal lobby to serve both the hotel and casino to be one structure.

In 1997, the OIN paid for construction of a water tower near the casino and donated it to the Town of Verona, as one of their community contributions. The water tower has a capacity to hold 1,000,000 gallons of water. In 2005 the OIN consumed 600,000 gallons per day, which was four times the amount guaranteed to them under an agreement with the Town of Verona. In about July 2005 the Town of Verona notified the OIN that after 5:00 p.m. on August 2, 2005, the water would be shut off after the tribe had used the 150,000 gallons of water that is guaranteed under the agreement. Just hours before this deadline, the OIN began paying for a new water pump to be installed to provide the needed water capacity for the casino and resort.

In 2002, construction of a gaming expansion and showroom were completed to provide the only Ticketmaster-approved venue in the area. The popularity of the casino provided sufficient revenue for the OIN to build second and third hotels at the site to satisfy demand. Construction of the new hotel was finished in late 2004. One of the hotels is the tallest structure between Syracuse and Albany to serve the common guest; the other hotel is a luxury resort that caters to golf customers and fans. DeSimone Consulting Engineers is the structural engineering firm for the project.

== Entertainment ==
The Turning Stone Casino and Resort hosted NESN and YES Network's Boston vs. New York Poker Challenge for two seasons.

The casino hosts several shows throughout the year, featuring musicians (KISS, Kelly Clarkson, Carrie Underwood, Fergie, Mariah Carey, Gwen Stefani, No Doubt, Jordin Sparks, Alicia Keys & Wayne Newton), comedians and other entertainment groups (Purrrfect Angels). The Irish Rovers played their two 2014 St Patrick's Day Concerts at the resort.

The resort's Atunyote Golf Club, located on tribal land, hosted the Turning Stone Resort Championship, a PGA Tour event, from 2007 through 2010. It was dropped from the tour schedule over a 2011 scheduling dispute. In 2006, it hosted the B.C. Open on the PGA Tour in July and the PGA Professional National Championship, which returns in 2016.

== Legal issues ==
The casino's early success met opposition from New York State, Oneida County, Madison County, Vernon town government, and a now-defunct citizens' group called Upstate Citizens for Equality (UCE). Several lawsuits were commenced that challenged the casino's legal authority to operate.

=== The tribal-state gaming compact ===
Until the November 5, 2013, election that amended the New York State Constitution, state law prohibited gambling, particularly class III gaming. The OIN wanted to take advantage of expanding the original bingo hall into a full casino, which would include Class III gaming. To do so, OIN negotiated a gaming compact with then Governor Mario Cuomo in 1993; a prerequisite to creating an Indian casino pursuant to the Indian Gaming Regulatory Act (IGRA). UCE challenged the compact's validity because the state legislature failed to approve the compact, pursuant to the New York State Constitution. In Pataki, the New York State Supreme Court held that despite Cuomo's representation and belief that legislative approval was unnecessary, the compact was not valid because the state legislature had not approved the same. The OIN appealed this decision to the Appellate Division, which affirmed the lower court. The Appellate Division granted leave to appeal to the Court of Appeals, which affirmed the Appellate Division's decision. After the Court of Appeals decision, the OIN petitioned the US Supreme Court to review the decision, but the high court denied certiori.

The OIN argued that the US Secretary of the Interior approved the compact and that removed the need for the state legislature's approval. The IGRA incorporates state laws into federal law. Specifically, 18 U.S.C. § 1166 provides "for purposes of Federal law, all State laws pertaining to the licensing, regulation, or prohibition of gambling, . . . shall apply in Indian country in the same manner and to the same extent as such laws apply elsewhere in the State." The Tenth Circuit held that the Secretary of the Interior's approval of a gaming compact has no impact on its validity because state law controls whether a gaming compact is valid." However, to date, the Second Circuit has not adopted this view in regards to the validity of a compact. The Pataki case was a state court action, and did not receive review in the Second Circuit.

The OIN then sought relief with the U.S. Department of the Interior (DOI) Bureau of Indian Affairs (BIA). After many failed attempts to negotiate a settlement by an April 2007 deadline, the Department of the Interior launched its own investigation into the compact's validity. On June 13, 2007, when the Associate Deputy Secretary of the Interior declined to reconsider its approval of the compact, Mr. Cason stated, "the 1993 Compact continues to be in effect for purposes of the IGRA". In UCE's lawsuit against the DOI, UCE challenged the DOI's decision regarding the compact's validity in addition to its challenge of the DOI's decision to take land into trust for the OIN. The US Interior Department's position was that the June 13, 2007, correspondence was not the end of it reconsidering the validity of the tribal-state compact, but merely a suspension of its reconsideration.

On August 7, 2007, in an action between New York State and the OIN, U.S. District Court Judge Kahn upheld Magistrate Treece's order directing the depositions of high-ranking officials and denying the State's motions. The decision also dismissed the Amended Complaint pleading, which attacked the Board's authority to amend the Compact due to Peterman and Seneca, on subject matter jurisdiction grounds. The fact that the amended complaint was dismissed on jurisdictional grounds deprived the court of the opportunity to address, directly, the compact's validity at the federal level. If the compact was invalid, then the Oneida Indian Nation would be violating federal law (operating a gaming facility without a tribal-state compact). Such a violation of federal law would have provided the requisite subject matter jurisdiction (federal question) to address the amended complaint. Even though the State sought to enjoin the Nation from operating Instant Multi Game ("IMG") based on its failure to adhere to the procedures in the Compact, the state has since dropped this case.

In 2013, the OIN, New York State, and Madison and Oneida Counties reached a landmark agreement that resolved the ongoing issues regarding the tribal-state compact, taxing issues, and the land upon which the resort casino is built. The agreement also ended all litigation pending between the three entities at the time of the agreement.

=== Casino location site legality ===
In addition to whether the tribe-state gaming compact was valid, the other issue was whether the location chosen to conduct the gaming was legal. New York State Law forbade Class III gaming on lands within New York State. The casino was located on Indian Territory as defined in the IGRA. However, the issue was compounded in light of the City of Sherrill v Oneida Indian Nation US Supreme Court decision. The DOI stated "compact does not specifically refer to the site where ... the Nation has built a major new facility in anticipation of being able to conduct gaming in the future. Since the compact tracks the [IGRA's definition of 'Indian lands'], we ... take no position with regard to whether this new facility is on 'Indian land' as that term is used in IGRA". Justice Ginsburg opined that although the land was part of the original tribal land grant of the 1796 Treaty of Canadagua, 200+ years in non-Indian control was too long a time for the Oneida Indian Nation to re-establish its immunity over those lands once it re-acquired the ownership of those lands. As directed in the Sherrill decision, the OIN applied to the DOI to have this land taken into trust, which was approved and formalized on September 4, 2014.

=== Gaming issues resolved ===
In May 2013, the OIN, New York State, and Madison and Oneida Counties reached a landmark agreement that resolved the gaming compact issue, among other issues needing resolution. As part of the agreement, the state held a referendum to amend the New York State Constitution to allow for full gambling casinos to operate within the state, which passed on November 5, 2013. The agreement paved the way for the OIN to open two more casinos within its 10-county area of exclusivity.

=== Liquor license ===
The casino applied for several liquor licenses with the New York State Liquor Authority in 2007 that were denied on October 3, 2007. After delaying a decision for a month, the liquor board told the OIN it cannot issue permits while unsettled sovereignty issues between the OIN and the state (related to land issues) are being litigated in court. "The Liquor Authority said the applications were disapproved without prejudice, and the Nation can reapply for the licenses after the reservation issue is solved." The licenses would have allowed the casino to serve alcohol on the gaming floor and at its several restaurants.

While the applications were pending before the Liquor Authority, the resort did not allow any kind of alcohol on the premises, as part of their application. Since the Liquor Authority's denial on the applications, the OIN lifted the alcohol ban in the resort. In response, the casino reached an agreement with the Beeches Hotel And Catering Service which received multiple one-day permits to sell alcohol at the premises. This generated much controversy because the Beech's owner's wife, Roan Destito sits on the committee governing liquor laws. In May 2010, the casino leased portions of the property to a subsidiary of the Beech's which in turn was awarded a full license to sell liquor and other alcohol. This allowed the casino to offer alcohol to its patrons at all the restaurants and the gaming floor, in addition to the private nightclub.

== Smoking ==
Smoking is allowed around the resort; non-smoking sections have been established and expanded in all areas. In 2016, the casino and resort underwent a $20 million upgrade and renovation project to provide better smoke-free areas on the gambling floor, and improve ventilation facilities to enhance all non-smoking zones within the resort and casino.

== Awards and recognitions ==
Since 2001, Turning Stone has received more than 480 different awards and recognitions.

In 2018, Forbes Travel Guide awarded the resort with three Four Star ratings for The Lodge hotel, Wildflowers restaurant, and Skana spa. The year before, AAA awarded three of its prestigious AAA Four Diamond Awards, to the resort's The Lodge and Tower hotels, as well as Wildflowers restaurant, making Turning Stone the only resort in the Northeastern United States to earn both three AAA and Forbes awards.

In 2017, the resort was named Best Overall Gaming Resort in New York by Casino Player magazine.

All three of Turning Stone's championship-caliber golf courses were included in Golfweek magazine's list of Best Golf Courses you Can Play in New York, and two of the courses were included in Golf Digest's 100 Greatest Public Courses in America.

The Nation's Atunyote Golf Course hosts both the Turning Stone Resort Championship and the annual Notah Begay III Foundation Challenge charity event.

== In popular culture ==
- American metal band Bible of the Devil recorded a song about the casino, titled "The Turning Stone". It appears on their 2008 album Freedom Metal.

== See also ==
- List of integrated resorts
