= 1960–61 NCAA University Division men's basketball rankings =

- Season: 1960–61
- NCAA Tournament: 1961
- NCAA Tournament Champions: Cincinnati
NCAA University Division men's basketball rankings


The 1960–61 NCAA men's basketball rankings was made up of two human polls, the AP Poll and the Coaches Poll.

== Legend ==
	Increase in ranking
	Decrease in ranking
	New to rankings from previous week
Italics	Number of first place votes
(#–#)	Win–loss record
т	Tied with team above or below also with this symbol

== AP Poll ==
The December AP polls included 20 ranked teams, while AP polls for the remainder of the season included only 10 ranked teams.

	Week 2 Dec. 13	Week 3 Dec. 20	Week 4 Dec. 27	Week 5 Jan. 3	Week 6 Jan. 10	Week 7 Jan. 17	Week 8 Jan. 24	Week 9 Jan. 31	Week 10 Feb. 7	Week 11 Feb. 14	Week 12 Feb. 21	Week 13 Feb. 28	Final Mar. 7	
1.	Ohio State (3–0)	Ohio State (4–0)	Ohio State (6–0)	Ohio State (9–0)	Ohio State (10–0)	Ohio State (12–0)	Ohio State (13–0)	Ohio State (14–0)	Ohio State (16–0)	Ohio State (18–0)	Ohio State (20–0)	Ohio State (22–0)	Ohio State (23–0)	1.
2.	Bradley (3–0)	Bradley (6–0)	Bradley (8–0)	Bradley (10–0)	Bradley (12–0)	St. Bonaventure (13–1)	St. Bonaventure (14–1)	St. Bonaventure (14–1)	St. Bonaventure (16–1)	St. Bonaventure (18–1)	St. Bonaventure (20–1)	St. Bonaventure (21–2)	Cincinnati (23–3)	2.
3.	Detroit (3–0)	St. Bonaventure (6–0)	St. Bonaventure (7–0)	St. Bonaventure (9–1)	St. Bonaventure (11–1)	Bradley (13–1)	Bradley (13–1)	Bradley (14–2)	Duke (16–1)	Duke (17–2)	Cincinnati (19–3)	Cincinnati (21–3)	St. Bonaventure (22–3)	3.
4.	Indiana (2–1)	Indiana (4–1)	Indiana (5–1)	Louisville (11–0)	Louisville (13–0)	Iowa (11–1)	North Carolina (12–2)	Duke (14–1)	Bradley (14–3)	Cincinnati (17–3)	Bradley (19–4)	Bradley (21–4)	Kansas State (20–4)	4.
5.	North Carolina (2–0)	Louisville (8–0)	Louisville (9–0)	St. John's (8–1)	St. John's (9–1)	Louisville (13–1)	Duke (13–1)	North Carolina (12–2)	Cincinnati (16–3)	Bradley (16–4)	Iowa (14–4)	North Carolina (19–4)	North Carolina (19–4)	5.
6.	St. Bonaventure (4–0)	St. John's (4–0)	Duke (7–0)	North Carolina (7–2)	Iowa (9–1)	North Carolina (10–2)	Iowa (12–2)	Iowa (12–2)	North Carolina (14–3)	Kansas State (15–3)	Duke (18–4)	Iowa (16–4)	Bradley (21–5)	6.
7.	St. John's (3–0)	Duke (5–0)	St. John's (6–0)	Iowa (8–1)	North Carolina (8–2)	DePaul (11–0)	St. John's (10–2)	St. John's (10–3)	Kansas State (14–3)	North Carolina (15–4)	North Carolina (18–4)	Kansas State (18–4)	USC (19–5)	7.
8.	Duke (3–0)	Detroit (4–1)	Saint Louis (7–1)	Duke (9–1)	Duke (11–1)	Duke (13–1)	Louisville (14–2)	Louisville (15–2)	USC (15–3)	USC (16–3)	Kansas State (16–4)	West Virginia (22–3)	Iowa (17–5)	8.
9.	Louisville (5–0)	Auburn (5–0)	Auburn (5–0)	UCLA (7–2)	Kansas State (10–2)	St. John's (10–2)	USC (12–2)	USC (14–2)	Iowa (12–3)	Iowa (13–3)	West Virginia (20–3)	Duke (20–5)	West Virginia (23–4)	9.
10.	NC State (4–0)	North Carolina (3–2) т	NC State (6–1)	Auburn (6–0)	UCLA (8–3)	Kansas State (11–2)	Purdue (9–3)	Kansas State (12–3)	Louisville (17–2)	West Virginia (18–3)	USC (16–4)	USC (17–5)	Duke (22–6)	10.
11.	Auburn (3–0)	NC State (5–1) т	North Carolina (4–2)											11.
12.	Maryland (4–0)	Kansas State (5–2)	Kansas State (6–2)											12.
13.	UCLA (3–1)	Providence (6–0)	Detroit (5–2)											13.
14.	Utah State (2–2)	UCLA (5–1)	Drake (6–0)											14.
15.	Georgia Tech (3–0)	Colorado (7–0)	Providence (7–0)											15.
16.	Kansas (2–1) т	Saint Louis (4–1)	UCLA (5–1) т											16.
17.	Wichita (4–0) т	Vanderbilt (5–0)	Vanderbilt (7–0) т											17.
18.	Utah (3–2)	Utah (4–2)	Wichita (7–2)											18.
19.	Illinois (2–0)	Wake Forest (5–2)	Memphis State (7–0) т											19.
20.	Kansas State (2–2) т Kentucky (2–1) т	Drake (5–0) т Kansas (3–2) т	Kentucky (4–3) т											20.
	Week 2 Dec. 13	Week 3 Dec. 20	Week 4 Dec. 27	Week 5 Jan. 3	Week 6 Jan. 10	Week 7 Jan. 17	Week 8 Jan. 24	Week 9 Jan. 31	Week 10 Feb. 7	Week 11 Feb. 14	Week 12 Feb. 21	Week 13 Feb. 28	Final Mar. 7	
		Dropped: Maryland (4–2); Utah State (4–3); Georgia Tech (3–2); Wichita (5–2); Illinois (2–2); Kentucky (2–3)	Dropped: Colorado (7–2); Utah (6–2); Wake Forest (5–2); Kansas (4–3)	Dropped: Indiana (6–3); Saint Louis (8–2); NC State (8–2); Kansas State (9–2); Detroit (7–2); Drake (8–1); Providence (7–2); Vanderbilt (8–2); Wichita (10–2); Memphis State (8–1); Kentucky (6–3)	Dropped: Auburn (7–1)	Dropped: UCLA (10–3)	Dropped: DePaul (11–2); Kansas State (11–3)	Dropped: Purdue (9–5)	Dropped: St. John's (11–4)	Dropped: Louisville (17–4)	None	None	None	

== UPI Poll ==
	Week 1 Dec. 5	Week 2 Dec. 13	Week 3 Dec. 20	Week 4 Dec. 27	Week 5 Jan. 3	Week 6 Jan. 10	Week 7 Jan. 17	Week 8 Jan. 24	Week 9 Jan. 31	Week 10 Feb. 7	Week 11 Feb. 14	Week 12 Feb. 21	Week 13 Feb. 28	Final Mar. 7	
1.	Ohio State (1–0)	Ohio State (3–0)	Ohio State (4–0)	Ohio State (6–0)	Ohio State (9–0)	Ohio State (10–0)	Ohio State (12–0)	Ohio State (13–0)	Ohio State (14–0)	Ohio State (16–0)	Ohio State (18–0)	Ohio State (20–0)	Ohio State (22–0)	Ohio State (23–0)	1.
2.	Bradley (1–0)	Bradley (3–0)	Bradley (6–0)	Bradley (8–0)	Bradley (10–0)	Bradley (12–0)	St. Bonaventure (13–1)	St. Bonaventure (14–1)	Bradley (14–2)	St. Bonaventure (16–1)	St. Bonaventure (18–1)	St. Bonaventure (20–1)	St. Bonaventure (21–2)	Cincinnati (23–3)	2.
3.	Indiana (1–0)	North Carolina (2–0)	Indiana (4–1)	St. John's (6–0)	St. Bonaventure (9–1)	St. Bonaventure (11–1)	Bradley (13–1)	Bradley (13–1)	St. Bonaventure (14–1)	Duke (16–1)	Duke (17–2)	Bradley (19–4)	Cincinnati (21–3)	St. Bonaventure (22–3)	3.
4.	Kansas (1–0)	Indiana (2–1)	St. John's (4–0)	Indiana (5–1)	St. John's (8–1)	Louisville (13–0)	Iowa (11–1)	North Carolina (12–2)	North Carolina (12–2)	Bradley (14–3)	USC (16–3)	Cincinnati (19–3)	Bradley (21–4)	Kansas State (20–4)	4.
5.	North Carolina (1–0)	Detroit (3–0)	St. Bonaventure (6–0)	St. Bonaventure (7–0)	North Carolina (7–2)	St. John's (9–1)	Kansas State (11–2)	St. John's (10–2)	Duke (14–1)	North Carolina (14–3)	Bradley (16–4)	North Carolina (18–4)	Kansas State (18–4)	USC (19–5)	5.
6.	St. Bonaventure (2–0) т	St. John's (3–0)	Detroit (4–1)	Saint Louis (7–1)	Louisville (11–0)	Kansas State (10–2)	North Carolina (10–2)	Duke (13–1)	USC (14–2)	USC (15–3)	Cincinnati (17–3)	USC (16–4)	North Carolina (19–4)	North Carolina (19–4)	6.
7.	Utah State (1–0) т	St. Bonaventure (4–0)	North Carolina (3–2)	UCLA (5–1)	Kansas State (9–2)	North Carolina (8–2)	St. John's (10–2)	Louisville (14–2)	Iowa (12–2) т	Kansas State (14–3)	North Carolina (15–4)	Kansas State (16–4)	Duke (20–5)	Bradley (21–5)	7.
8.	Cincinnati (2–0)	Kansas (2–1)	UCLA (5–1)	Detroit (5–2)	UCLA (7–2)	Iowa (9–1)	Duke (13–1)	Iowa (12–2)	Louisville (15–2) т	Iowa (12–3)	Kansas State (15–3)	Duke (18–4)	Iowa (16–4)	St. John's (19–4)	8.
9.	Detroit (1–0)	Providence (3–0)	Louisville (8–0)	Louisville (9–0)	Iowa (8–1)	Duke (11–1)	Louisville (13–1)	USC (12–2)	St. John's (10–3)	Cincinnati (16–3) т	St. John's (13–4)	Iowa (14–4)	St. John's (17–4)	Duke (22–6)	9.
10.	St. John's (1–0)	Cincinnati (3–1)	Kansas (3–2)	Duke (7–0)	Duke (9–1)	UCLA (8–3)	DePaul (11–0)	Kansas State (11–3)	Kansas State (12–3)	Louisville (17–2) т	Louisville (17–4)	St. John's (15–4)	USC (17–5)	Iowa (17–5) т	10.
11.	Kansas State (1–0)	UCLA (3–1)	Kansas State (5–2)	North Carolina (4–2)	Detroit (7–2)	Indiana (7–3)	UCLA (10–3)	UCLA (10–3)	UCLA (12–3)	Kansas (11–5)	Iowa (13–3)	Kansas (15–5)	West Virginia (22–3)	Wake Forest (17–10) т	11.
12.	Georgia Tech (2–0)	Georgia Tech (3–0)	Duke (5–0)	Kansas State (6–2)	Saint Louis (8–2)	Utah (8–4)	USC (12–2)	Kansas (10–5)	Kansas (10–5)	UCLA (13–4)	Kansas (13–5)	Utah (17–5)	Utah (19–5)	West Virginia (23–4)	12.
13.	Providence (1–0)	Duke (3–0)	Saint Louis (4–1)	Auburn (5–0) т	Indiana (6–3)	USC (10–2)	Kansas (9–4)	Indiana (8–3) т	Indiana (9–3)	St. John's (11–4)	Utah (15–5)	Louisville (18–5)	Louisville (18–6)	Utah (20–6)	13.
14.	Auburn (2–0)	Auburn (3–0)	California (4–0)	Kansas (4–3) т	Vanderbilt (8–0) т	Detroit (9–3)	Indiana (8–3)	Memphis State (13–1) т	Cincinnati (14–3)	Indiana (10–5)	UCLA (13–5)	West Virginia (20–3)	Dayton (17–7)	Saint Louis (20–7)	14.
15.	Utah (0–2)	Maryland (4–0)	Colorado (7–0)	California (6–1)	Utah (7–4) т	Memphis State (9–1) т	Utah (10–4)	DePaul (11–2)	Memphis State (14–1)	Utah (14–5)	West Virginia (18–3)	UCLA (14–6)	UCLA (15–6)	Louisville (18–7)	15.
16.	Duke (1–0)	California (3–0)	Auburn (5–0)	Providence (7–0) т	West Virginia (6–2) т	Vanderbilt (10–0) т	Memphis State (11–1)	Cincinnati (13–3)	Utah (12–5)	West Virginia (16–3)	Memphis State (17–2)	Dayton (15–7)	Memphis State (20–2)	Saint Joseph's (22–4)	16.
17.	California (1–0)	Utah State (2–2)	Providence (6–0)	Vanderbilt (7–0)	Wichita (10–2)	Wichita (11–3)	Wake Forest (9–5)	Utah (11–5)	Wake Forest (11–5)	Wichita (15–4)	Wichita (16–4)	Memphis State (19–2)	Kentucky (15–7)	Dayton (19–7)	17.
18.	Washington (1–1)	Utah (3–2)	NC State (5–1)	Utah (6–2)	Kansas (6–4)	DePaul (9–0) т	Cincinnati (11–3)	Xavier (11–3)	Detroit (11–5)	Mississippi State (14–3)	Indiana (10–7)	Kentucky (13–7)	Vanderbilt (18–4) т	Kentucky (17–7)	18.
19.	Western Kentucky (2–0)	Illinois (2–0)	Wake Forest (5–2)	Memphis State (7–0)	Auburn (6–0)	Kansas (7–4) т	Wichita (12–4)	West Virginia (12–3)	West Virginia (13–3)	Saint Louis (12–5) т	Saint Joseph's (16–4)	Wichita (16–7)	Wichita (16–8) т	Texas Tech (14–9)	19.
20.	Dayton (0–0)	Washington (2–1)	Utah State (4–3)	NC State (6–1)	Providence (7–2) т Memphis State (8–1) т NC State (8–2) т USC (8–2) т Iowa State (5–4) т	West Virginia (8–2)	Detroit (9–5)	Wake Forest (10–5) т Wichita (13–4) т	Wichita (14–4)	Oregon (12–5) т	Ohio (15–4) т Providence (16–3) т	Saint Louis (14–7)	Texas Tech (13–8)	Memphis State (20–2)	20.
	Week 1 Dec. 5	Week 2 Dec. 13	Week 3 Dec. 20	Week 4 Dec. 27	Week 5 Jan. 3	Week 6 Jan. 10	Week 7 Jan. 17	Week 8 Jan. 24	Week 9 Jan. 31	Week 10 Feb. 7	Week 11 Feb. 14	Week 12 Feb. 21	Week 13 Feb. 28	Final Mar. 7	
		Dropped: Kansas State (2–2); Western Kentucky (3–1); Dayton (1–1)	Dropped: Cincinnati (3–2); Georgia Tech (3–4); Maryland (4–2); Utah (4–2); Illinois (3–2); Washington (3–2)	Dropped: Colorado (7–2); Wake Forest (5–2); Utah State (5–3)	Dropped: California (8–2)	Dropped: Saint Louis (8–4); Auburn (7–1); Providence (9–2); NC State (8–3); Iowa State (6–5)	Dropped: Vanderbilt (10–2); West Virginia (9–3)	Dropped: Detroit	Dropped: DePaul; Xavier	Dropped: Memphis State; Wake Forest; Detroit	Dropped: Mississippi State; Saint Louis; Oregon	Dropped: Indiana; Saint Joseph's; Ohio; Providence	Dropped: Kansas; Saint Louis	Dropped: UCLA (18–8); Vanderbilt (18–5); Wichita (16–9)	
