= 1960–61 Kentucky Wildcats men's basketball team =

1960–61 season of University of Kentucky men's basketball team

1960–61 Kentucky Wildcats men's basketball

NCAA Tournament, Mideast finals
- Conference: Southeastern Conference

Ranking
- Coaches: No. 18
- Record: 19–9 (10–4 SEC)
- Head coach: Adolph Rupp
- Captain: Dick Parsons
- Home arena: Memorial Coliseum

1960–61 Southeastern Conference men's basketball standings
| | Conf. | | | | Overall |
| Team | W | | L | PCT | W | | L | PCT |
|---|---|---|---|---|---|---|---|---|
| Mississippi State | 11 | – | 3 | .786 | 19 | – | 6 | .760 |
| Vanderbilt | 10 | – | 4 | .714 | 19 | – | 5 | .792 |
| Kentucky | 10 | – | 4 | .714 | 19 | – | 9 | .679 |
| Florida | 9 | – | 5 | .643 | 15 | – | 11 | .577 |
| Auburn | 8 | – | 6 | .571 | 15 | – | 7 | .682 |
| Georgia Tech | 6 | – | 8 | .429 | 13 | – | 13 | .500 |
| Tulane | 6 | – | 8 | .429 | 11 | – | 13 | .458 |
| LSU | 6 | – | 8 | .429 | 11 | – | 14 | .440 |
| Ole Miss | 5 | – | 9 | .357 | 10 | – | 14 | .417 |
| Alabama | 5 | – | 9 | .357 | 7 | – | 18 | .280 |
| Tennessee | 4 | – | 10 | .286 | 10 | – | 15 | .400 |
| Georgia | 4 | – | 10 | .286 | 8 | – | 18 | .308 |
Rankings from AP Poll

The 1960–61 Kentucky Wildcats men's basketball team represented the University of Kentucky during the 1960–61 NCAA men's basketball season.

== Schedule ==
| Date time, TV | Rank^{#} | Opponent^{#} | Result | Record | Site city, state |
|---|---|---|---|---|---|
| December 1* | | VMI | W 72–56 | | Memorial Coliseum; Lexington, KY |
| December 3* | | Florida State | L 58–63 | | Memorial Coliseum; Lexington, KY |
| December 7* | | vs. Notre Dame | W 68–62 | | Freedom Hall; Louisville, KY |
| December 13* | No. 20 | vs. No. 5 North Carolina; Rivalry | W 70–65 | | Greensboro Coliseum; Greensboro, NC |
| December 17* | No. 20 | at Temple | L 58–66 | | |
| December 21* | | Illinois; UK Invitation Tournament | W 83–78 | | Memorial Coliseum; Lexington, KY |
| December 22* | | No. 16 Saint Louis; UK Invitation Tournament | L 72–74 ^{OT} | | Memorial Coliseum; Lexington, KY |
| December 31* | No. 19 | Missouri | W 81–69 | | Memorial Coliseum; Lexington, KY |
| January 2* | No. 19 | Miami (OH) | W 70–58 | | Memorial Coliseum; Lexington, KY |
| January 7 | | Georgia Tech | W 89–79 | | Memorial Coliseum; Lexington, KY |
| January 9 | | at Vanderbilt | L 62–64 | | Nashville, TN |
| January 13 | | at LSU | L 59–73 | | Baton Rouge, LA |
| January 14 | | at Tulane | L 70–72 | | New Orleans, LA |
| January 21 | | Tennessee | W 83–54 | | Memorial Coliseum; Lexington, KY |
| January 30 | | at Georgia Tech | L 60–62 | | Atlanta, GA |
| February 4 | | Florida; Rivalry | W 89–68 | | Memorial Coliseum; Lexington, KY |
| February 7 | | Georgia | W 74–67 | | Memorial Coliseum; Lexington, KY |
| February 11 | | vs. Ole Miss | W 74–60 | | Municipal Auditorium; Jackson, MS |
| February 13 | | at Mississippi State | W 68–62 | | Starkville, MS |
| February 17* | | UCLA | W 77–76 | | Memorial Coliseum; Lexington, KY |
| February 21 | | Vanderbilt | W 60–59 | | Memorial Coliseum; Lexington, KY |
| February 25 | | Alabama | W 80–53 | | Memorial Coliseum; Lexington, KY |
| February 27 | | Auburn | W 77–51 | | Memorial Coliseum; Lexington, KY |
| March 4 | | at Tennessee | W 68–61 | | Knoxville, TN |
| March 9* | | vs. Vanderbilt; SEC Playoff | W 88–67 | | Knoxville, TN |
| March 11* | | vs. Marquette | L 72–88 | | Chicago Stadium; Chicago, IL |
| March 17* | | vs. Morehead State; NCAA Tournament | W 71–64 | | Freedom Hall; Louisville, KY |
| March 18* | | vs. No. 1 Ohio State; NCAA Tournament | L 74–87 | | Freedom Hall; Louisville, KY |
*Non-conference game. ^{#}Rankings from AP Poll. (#) Tournament seedings in parentheses. All times are in Eastern Time.
