= 1959–60 Idaho Vandals men's basketball team =

American college basketball season

1959–60 Idaho Vandals men's basketball
- Conference: Independent
- Record: 11–15 (.423)
- Head coach: Dave Strack (1st season)
- Assistant coach: Wayne Anderson
- MVP: Joe King
- Home arena: Memorial Gymnasium

The 1959–60 Idaho Vandals men's basketball team represented the University of Idaho during the 1959–60 NCAA University Division basketball season. The independent Vandals were led by first-year head coach Dave Strack and played their home games on campus at Memorial Gymnasium in Moscow, Idaho.

In the four years between the demise of the Pacific Coast Conference (1959) and the founding of the Big Sky Conference (1963), Idaho was an independent; this season the Vandals had an 11–15 (.423) record.

Hired in June, Strack was previously an assistant coach at the University of Michigan, his alma mater. After just one season in Moscow, Strack resigned in May 1960 to return to Michigan as head coach; he was succeeded at Idaho by Joe Cipriano, a former player (and assistant coach) at the University of Washington in Seattle.
