= 1967–68 Wisconsin Badgers men's basketball team =

American college basketball season

1967–68 Wisconsin Badgers men's basketball
- Conference: Big Ten Conference
- Record: 13–11 (7–7 Big Ten)
- Head coach: John Erickson
- Home arena: UW Fieldhouse

1967–68 Big Ten Conference men's basketball standings
	Conf.				Overall
Team	W		L	PCT	W		L	PCT
Ohio State	10	–	4	.714	21	–	8	.724
Iowa	10	–	4	.714	16	–	9	.640
Purdue	9	–	5	.643	15	–	9	.625
Northwestern	8	–	6	.571	13	–	10	.565
Wisconsin	7	–	7	.500	13	–	11	.542
Michigan State	6	–	8	.429	12	–	12	.500
Illinois	6	–	8	.429	11	–	13	.458
Michigan	6	–	8	.429	11	–	13	.458
Indiana	4	–	10	.286	10	–	14	.417
Minnesota	4	–	10	.286	7	–	17	.292
Rankings from AP Poll

The 1967–68 Wisconsin Badgers men's basketball team represented University of Wisconsin–Madison. The head coach was John Erickson, coaching his ninth season with the Badgers. The team played their home games at the UW Fieldhouse in Madison, Wisconsin and was a member of the Big Ten Conference.

== Schedule ==
Date time, TV	Rank^{#}	Opponent^{#}	Result	Record	Site city, state
Regular Season
12/02/1967*		DePauw	W 90–68	1–0	UW Fieldhouse; Madison, WI
12/05/1967*		Notre Dame	L 73–81	1–1	UW Fieldhouse; Madison, WI
12/09/1967*		Southern Methodist	W 120–82	2–1	UW Fieldhouse; Madison, WI
12/15/1967*		vs. LSU; Milwaukee Classic	W 96–94	3–1	Milwaukee Arena; Milwaukee, WI
12/16/1967*		vs. Marquette; Milwaukee Classic	W 70–62	4–1	Milwaukee Arena; Milwaukee, WI
12/20/1967*		Florida	W 86–81	5–1	UW Fieldhouse; Madison, WI
12/27/1967*		vs. Pennsylvania; Quaker City Classic	W 86–67	6–1	Palestra; Philadelphia, PA
12/28/1967*		vs. Temple; Quaker City Classic	L 80–82	6–2	Palestra; Philadelphia, PA
12/29/1967*		vs. Duquesne; Quaker City Classic	L 66–76	6–3	Palestra; Philadelphia, PA
1/06/1968		Michigan	W 77–75	7–3 (1–0)	UW Fieldhouse; Madison, WI
1/09/1968		at Purdue	L 79–99	7–4 (1–1)	Purdue Arena; West Lafayette, IN
1/11/1968*		at Marquette	L 56–71	7–5	Marquette Gymnasium; Milwaukee, WI
1/16/1968		Michigan State	W 70–68	8–5 (2–1)	UW Fieldhouse; Madison, WI
1/30/1968		at Minnesota	W 72–62	9–5 (3–1)	Williams Arena; Minneapolis, MN
2/03/1968		at Ohio State	L 64–86	9–6 (3–2)	St. John Arena; Columbus, OH
2/06/1968		Illinois	L 60–68	9–7 (3–3)	UW Fieldhouse; Madison, WI
2/10/1968		Indiana	W 95–83	10–7 (4–3)	UW Fieldhouse; Madison, WI
2/12/1968		Ohio State	W 86–78	11–7 (5–3)	UW Fieldhouse; Madison, WI
2/17/1968		at Iowa	L 61–69	11–8 (5–4)	Iowa Field House; Iowa City, IA
2/24/1968		at Michigan State	L 77–87	11–9 (5–5)	Jenison Fieldhouse; East Lansing, MI
2/27/1968		Minnesota	W 94–82	12–9 (6–5)	UW Fieldhouse; Madison, WI
3/02/1968		Purdue	W 104–84	13–9 (7–5)	UW Fieldhouse; Madison, WI
3/05/1968		at Indiana	L 85–93	13–10 (7–6)	New Fieldhouse; Bloomington, IN
3/09/1968		at Northwestern	L 75–77	13–11 (7–7)	Welsh-Ryan Arena; Evanston, IL
*Non-conference game. ^{#}Rankings from AP Poll. (#) Tournament seedings in parentheses.
