= 1960–61 Illinois Fighting Illini men's basketball team =

American college basketball season

1960–61 Illinois Fighting Illini men's basketball
- Conference: Big Ten Conference
- Record: 9-15 (5-9 Big Ten)
- Head coach: Harry Combes (14th season)
- Assistant coaches: Howie Braun (24th season); Jim Wright (3rd season)
- MVP: Dave Downey
- Captain: Selected each game
- Home arena: Huff Hall

1960–61 Big Ten Conference men's basketball standings
	Conf.				Overall
Team	W		L	PCT	W		L	PCT
No. 1 Ohio State	14	–	0	1.000	27	–	1	.964
No. 8 Iowa	10	–	4	.714	18	–	6	.750
Purdue	10	–	4	.714	16	–	7	.696
Indiana	8	–	6	.571	15	–	9	.625
Minnesota	8	–	6	.571	10	–	13	.435
Northwestern	6	–	8	.429	10	–	12	.455
Illinois	5	–	9	.357	9	–	15	.375
Wisconsin	4	–	10	.286	7	–	17	.292
Michigan State	3	–	11	.214	7	–	17	.292
Michigan	2	–	12	.143	6	–	18	.250
Rankings from https://www.sports-reference.com/cbb/conferences/big-ten/1961.html

The 1960–61 Illinois Fighting Illini men's basketball team represented the University of Illinois.

== Regular season ==
Head coach Harry Combes experienced the worst record of his 20 years at the University of Illinois. His Fighting Illini basketball team, for the second year in a row, played in a mid-season tournament. The tournament they would compete in would be the Kentucky Invitational Tournament held at Memorial Coliseum in Lexington, Kentucky December 21–22.

The 1960-61 team utilized several returning lettermen including the leading scorer and team "MVP" Dave Downey. It also saw the return of Jerry Colangelo, John Wessels, Bill Burwell, Bill Small, as well as Doug Mills. The Illini also added sophomore Bob Starnes to their lineup. The Illini finished the season with a conference record of 5 wins and 9 losses, finishing 7th in the Big Ten. They would finish with an overall record of 9 wins and 15 losses. The starting lineup included Bill Burwell at the center position, Bill Small and Jerry Colangelo at guard and Dave Downey and John Wessels at the forward slots.

=== Roster ===
1960–61 Illinois Fighting Illini men's basketball team
Players
Coaches

Pos.	#	Name	Height	Weight	Year	Previous school	Hometown
C	10	John Wessels	6 ft 7 in (2.01 m)	210 lb (95 kg)	Sr	Rockford West High School	Rockford, Illinois
F	20	Jerry Renner	6 ft 1 in (1.85 m)	180 lb (82 kg)	Jr	East High School	Aurora, Illinois
G	21	Sam Leeper	6 ft 0 in (1.83 m)	165 lb (75 kg)	Jr	Unity High School	Tolono, Illinois
G	22	Jay Lovelace	6 ft 2 in (1.88 m)	165 lb (75 kg)	So	Carbondale Community High School	Carbondale, Illinois
G	23	Jerry Colangelo	6 ft 2 in (1.88 m)	175 lb (79 kg)	Jr	Bloom High School	Chicago Heights, Illinois
C	25	Bill Burwell	6 ft 8 in (2.03 m)	243 lb (110 kg)	So	Boys High School	Brooklyn, New York
G	30	Jeff Ferguson	6 ft 3 in (1.91 m)	180 lb (82 kg)	Fr	Benton Consolidated High School	Benton, Illinois
G	31	Doug Mills	6 ft 0 in (1.83 m)	165 lb (75 kg)	Jr	Galesburg High School	Galesburg, Illinois
F	33	James Knoefel	6 ft 4 in (1.93 m)	180 lb (82 kg)	Jr	Valparaiso High School	Valparaiso, Indiana
F	34	Gary McClung	6 ft 4 in (1.93 m)	185 lb (84 kg)	Jr	Maroa-Forsyth High School	Maroa, Illinois
F	40	Dave Downey	6 ft 4 in (1.93 m)	200 lb (91 kg)	So	Canton High School	Canton, Illinois
G	41	Jerry Curless	6 ft 0 in (1.83 m)	160 lb (73 kg)	Jr	VIT High School	Table Grove, Illinois
F	42	Ed Searcy	6 ft 5 in (1.96 m)	185 lb (84 kg)	Jr	Attucks High School	Indianapolis, Indiana
F	44	Bob Starnes	6 ft 4 in (1.93 m)	180 lb (82 kg)	So	Gage Park High School	Chicago, Illinois
G	51	Bill Mohlenbrock	6 ft 3 in (1.91 m)	178 lb (81 kg)	So	Murphysboro High School	Murphysboro, Illinois
G	53	Bill Small	6 ft 2 in (1.88 m)	185 lb (84 kg)	So	West Aurora High School	Aurora, Illinois

Head coach

- Harry Combes (University of Illinois) (14th year)

Assistant coach(es)

- Howie Braun (University of Illinois) (24th year)
- Jim Wright (University of Illinois) (3rd year)

Legend

- (C) Team captain
- (S) Suspended
- (I) Ineligible
- (W) Walk-on
- Injured
- Current redshirt

Roster

== Schedule ==
Date time, TV	Rank^{#}	Opponent^{#}	Result	Record	Site (attendance) city, state
Non-Conference regular season
12/1/1960*		Creighton	W 99-74	1-0	Huff Hall (6,708); Champaign, IL
12/6/1960*		Butler	W 84-52	2-0	Huff Hall (6,689); Champaign, IL
12/12/1960*		at Colorado	L 81-90	2-1	Balch Fieldhouse (4,100); Boulder, CO
12/17/1960*		at Marquette	L 88-96	2-2	Marquette Gymnasium (8,440); Milwaukee, WI
12/19/1960*		Washington State	W 79-58	3-2	Huff Hall (3,507); Champaign, IL
12/21/1960*		at Kentucky; Kentucky Invitational Tournament	L 78-83	3-3	Memorial Coliseum (7,500); Lexington, KY
12/22/1960*		vs. California; Kentucky Invitational Tournament	L 54-72	3-4	Memorial Coliseum (8,000); Lexington, KY
12/27/1960*		at Butler	L 68-70	3-5	Hinkle Fieldhouse (6,100); Indianapolis, IN
12/28/1960*		vs. Notre Dame	L 66-69	3-6	Hinkle Fieldhouse (6,591); Indianapolis, IN
Big Ten regular season
1/7/1961		at No. 1 Ohio State	L 65-91	3-7 (0-1)	St. John Arena (13,408); Columbus, OH
1/14/1961		Michigan	W 88-64	4-7 (1-1)	Huff Hall (6,705); Champaign, IL
1/16/1961		at No. 6 Iowa; Rivalry	L 71-78	4-8 (1-2)	Iowa Field House (12,700); Iowa City, IA
1/28/1961*		vs. Notre Dame	W 77-62	5-8	Chicago Stadium (11,800); Chicago, IL
1/30/1961		Michigan State	W 93-92	6-8 (2-2)	Huff Hall (3,132); Champaign, IL
2/4/1961		at Minnesota	W 65-60	7-8 (3-2)	Williams Arena (12,001); Minneapolis, MN
2/6/1961		Wisconsin	W 77-73	8-8 (4-2)	Huff Hall (6,775); Champaign, IL
2/11/1961		at Purdue	L 73-89	8-9 (4-3)	Lambert Fieldhouse (10,000); West Lafayette, IN
2/18/1961		Northwestern; Rivalry	L 72-78	8-10 (4-4)	Huff Hall (6,569); Champaign, IL
2/20/1961		at Michigan State	L 80-90	8-11 (4-5)	Jenison Fieldhouse (4,185); East Lansing, MI
2/25/1961		at Indiana; Rivalry	L 82-93	8-12 (4-6)	New Fieldhouse (600); Bloomington, IN
2/27/1961		Minnesota	L 76-85	8-13 (4-7)	Huff Hall (6,569); Champaign, IL
3/4/1961		Purdue	W 85-75	9-13 (5-7)	Huff Hall (6,891); Champaign, IL
3/6/1961		at Michigan	L 66-74	9-14 (5-8)	Yost Field House (2,000); Ann Arbor, MI
3/11/1961		No. 1 Ohio State	L 66–95	9-15 (5-9)	Huff Hall (6,912); Champaign, IL
*Non-conference game. ^{#}Rankings from AP Poll. (#) Tournament seedings in parentheses. All times are in Central Time.

== Player stats ==
Player	Games played	Field goals	Free throws	Rebounds	Points
Dave Downey	24	157	88	267	402
Jerry Colangelo	24	128	71	94	327
John Wessels	24	119	83	217	321
Bill Burwell	24	117	57	207	291
Bill Small	22	73	42	56	188
Bob Starnes	24	29	25	61	83
Doug Mills	21	26	20	15	72
Ed Searcy	13	23	12	62	58
Jerry Curless	22	17	13	38	47
Jerry Renner	19	11	2	22	24
Jeff Ferguson	11	2	5	4	9
Jay Lovelace	7	2	2	2	6
Sam Leeper	7	1	2	5	2
Bill Mohlenbrock	2	0	0	1	0
Butch Jones	1	0	0	1	0

== Awards and honors ==
- Dave Downey
  - Converse Honorable Mention All-American
  - Team Most Valuable Player
- John Wessels
  - Converse Honorable Mention All-American

== Team players drafted into the NBA ==
Player	NBA club	Round	Pick
John Wessels	Chicago Packers	8	8
