= 1960–61 Iowa Hawkeyes men's basketball team =

American college basketball season

1960–61 Iowa Hawkeyes men's basketball

Los Angeles Classic champion
- Conference: Big Ten Conference

Ranking
- Coaches: No. 10 т
- AP: No. 8
- Record: 18–6 (10–4 Big Ten)
- Head coach: Sharm Scheuerman (3rd season)
- Assistant coaches: Dick Schultz (1st season); Bob King (1st season)
- MVP: Don Nelson
- Home arena: Iowa Field House (Capacity: 13,365)

1960–61 Big Ten Conference men's basketball standings
| | Conf. | | | | Overall |
| Team | W | | L | PCT | W | | L | PCT |
|---|---|---|---|---|---|---|---|---|
| No. 1 Ohio State | 14 | – | 0 | 1.000 | 27 | – | 1 | .964 |
| No. 8 Iowa | 10 | – | 4 | .714 | 18 | – | 6 | .750 |
| Purdue | 10 | – | 4 | .714 | 16 | – | 7 | .696 |
| Indiana | 8 | – | 6 | .571 | 15 | – | 9 | .625 |
| Minnesota | 8 | – | 6 | .571 | 10 | – | 13 | .435 |
| Northwestern | 6 | – | 8 | .429 | 10 | – | 12 | .455 |
| Illinois | 5 | – | 9 | .357 | 9 | – | 15 | .375 |
| Wisconsin | 4 | – | 10 | .286 | 7 | – | 17 | .292 |
| Michigan State | 3 | – | 11 | .214 | 7 | – | 17 | .292 |
| Michigan | 2 | – | 12 | .143 | 6 | – | 18 | .250 |
Rankings from https://www.sports-reference.com/cbb/conferences/big-ten/1961.html

The 1960–61 Iowa Hawkeyes men's basketball team represented the University of Iowa in intercollegiate basketball during the 1960–61 season. The team was led by head coach Sharm Scheuerman and played their home games at the Iowa Field House. The Hawkeyes finished the season 18–6 and were 10–4 in Big Ten conference games.

== Roster ==
1960–61 Iowa Hawkeyes men's basketball team
Players
Coaches

| Pos. | # | Name | Height | Weight | Year | Hometown |
|---|---|---|---|---|---|---|
| F | 11 | Matt Szykowny | — | — | So |
| C | 13 | Frank Allan | — | — | Sr |
| C | 15 | Don Nelson | 6 ft 6 in (1.98 m) | 205 lb (93 kg) | Jr | Rock Island, Illinois |
| F | 24 | Mark Schantz | — | — | Sr |
| G | 30 | Tom Purcell | 6 ft 2 in (1.88 m) | — | So |
| F | 40 | Robert McCauley | — | — |
| G | 42 | Joel Novak | 6 ft 0 in (1.83 m) | 180 lb (82 kg) | Jr | Rock Island, Illinois |
| G | 43 | Gary Lorenz | 6 ft 2 in (1.88 m) | — | Jr |
| G | 44 | Joe Reddington | — | — | So |
| F | 45 | Dick Shaw | — | — | So |
| F | 52 | Dennis Runge | 6 ft 9 in (2.06 m) | 190 lb (86 kg) | Sr | Paullina, Iowa |

Head coach

- Sharm Scheuerman (Iowa)

Assistant coach(es)

Legend

- (C) Team captain
- (S) Suspended
- (I) Ineligible
- (W) Walk-on
- Injured
- Current redshirt

Connie Hawkins was on the freshmen team during the 1960–61 season. However, he could not play due to NCAA rules on freshmen players at the time and would later be barred from playing for Iowa after the season's conclusion due to his perceived involvement in the 1961 NCAA University Division men's basketball gambling scandal just by seeing key perpetrator Jack Molinas.

== Schedule/results ==
| Date time, TV | Rank^{#} | Opponent^{#} | Result | Record | Site (attendance) city, state |
Regular Season
| Dec 1, 1960* | | South Dakota State | W 77–75 | 1–0 | Iowa Field House; Iowa City, Iowa |
| Dec 3, 1960* | | at Evansville | W 83–71 | 2–0 | Roberts Municipal Stadium; Evansville, Indiana |
| Dec 10, 1960* | | Saint Louis | L 55–61 | 2–1 | Iowa Field House; Iowa City, Iowa |
| Dec 12, 1960* | | Creighton | W 89–71 | 3–1 | Iowa Field House; Iowa City, Iowa |
| Dec 17, 1960* | | Wyoming | W 78–67 | 4–1 | Iowa Field House; Iowa City, Iowa |
| Dec 19, 1960* | | Arizona | W 105–64 | 5–1 | Iowa Field House; Iowa City, Iowa |
| Dec 28, 1960* | | vs. California; Los Angeles Classic | W 83–80 | 6–1 | Los Angeles Memorial Sports Arena; Los Angeles, California |
| Dec 29, 1960* | | at Southern California; Los Angeles Classic | W 70–62 | 7–1 | Los Angeles Memorial Sports Arena; Los Angeles, California |
| Dec 30, 1960* | | at No. 16 UCLA; Los Angeles Classic | W 71–65 | 8–1 | Los Angeles Memorial Sports Arena; Los Angeles, California |
| Jan 7, 1961 | No. 7 | Minnesota | W 71–46 | 9–1 (1–0) | Iowa Field House; Iowa City, Iowa |
| Jan 9, 1961 | No. 6 | at Wisconsin | W 76–68 | 10–1 (2–0) | Wisconsin Field House; Madison, Wisconsin |
| Jan 14, 1961 | No. 6 | Michigan State | W 86–72 | 11–1 (3–0) | Iowa Field House; Iowa City, Iowa |
| Jan 16, 1961 | No. 4 | Illinois; Rivalry | W 78–71 | 12–1 (4–0) | Iowa Field House (12,700); Iowa City, Iowa |
| Jan 21, 1961 | No. 4 | at Purdue | L 41–47 | 12–2 (4–1) | Lambert Fieldhouse; West Lafayette, Indiana |
| Feb 4, 1961* | No. 6 | vs. Cincinnati | L 60–77 | 12–3 | Chicago Stadium; Chicago, Illinois |
| Feb 11, 1961 | No. 9 | at Indiana | W 74–67 | 13–3 (5–1) | New Field House; Bloomington, Indiana |
| Feb 13, 1961 | No. 9 | Wisconsin | W 63–61 | 14–3 (6–1) | Iowa Field House; Iowa City, Iowa |
| Feb 18, 1961 | No. 9 | No. 1 Ohio State | L 61–62 | 14–4 (6–2) | Iowa Field House; Iowa City, Iowa |
| Feb 20, 1961 | No. 5 | at Michigan | W 50–46 | 15–4 (7–2) | Yost Field House; Ann Arbor, Michigan |
| Feb 25, 1961 | No. 5 | at Minnesota | W 61–43 | 16–4 (8–2) | Williams Arena; Minneapolis, Minnesota |
| Feb 27, 1961 | No. 6 | Purdue | W 73–62 | 17–4 (9–2) | Iowa Field House; Iowa City, Iowa |
| Mar 4, 1961 | No. 6 | Indiana | L 69–78 | 17–5 (9–3) | Iowa Field House; Iowa City, Iowa |
| Mar 6, 1961 | No. 8 | at Michigan State | L 64–74 | 17–6 (9–4) | Jenison Field House; East Lansing, Michigan |
| Mar 11, 1961 | No. 8 | at Northwestern | W 63–62 | 18–6 (10–4) | McGaw Memorial Hall; Evanston, Illinois |
*Non-conference game. ^{#}Rankings from AP Poll. (#) Tournament seedings in parentheses.

== Rankings ==
Ranking movements Legend: ██ Increase in ranking ██ Decrease in ranking — = Not ranked
| | Week | | | | | | | | | | | | | |
| Poll | 1 | 2 | 3 | 4 | 5 | 6 | 7 | 8 | 9 | 10 | 11 | 12 | 13 | Final |
|---|---|---|---|---|---|---|---|---|---|---|---|---|---|---|
| AP | Not released | — | — | — | 7 | 6 | 4 | 6 | 6 | 9 | 9 | 5 | 6 | 8 |
| Coaches | — | — | — | — | 9 | 8 | 4 | 8 | 7 | 8 | 11 | 9 | 8 | 10 |

== Awards and honors ==
- Don Nelson – Honorable Mention All-American (AP)
