= 1960–61 UCLA Bruins men's basketball team =

American college basketball season

1960–61 UCLA Bruins men's basketball
- Conference: Athletic Association of Western Universities
- Record: 18–8 (7–5 AAWU)
- Head coach: John R. Wooden (13th season)
- Assistant coaches: Bill Putnam; Jerry Norman
- Home arena: Los Angeles Memorial Sports Arena

1960–61 AAWU Conference men's basketball standings
	Conf.				Overall
Team	W		L	PCT	W		L	PCT
No. 7 USC	9	–	3	.750	21	–	8	.724
UCLA	7	–	5	.583	18	–	8	.692
Washington	6	–	6	.500	13	–	13	.500
California	5	–	7	.417	16	–	10	.615
Stanford	3	–	9	.250	7	–	17	.292
Rankings from AP Poll

The 1960–61 UCLA Bruins men's basketball team represented the University of California, Los Angeles during the 1960–61 NCAA men's basketball season and were members of the Pacific Coast Conference. The Bruins were led by 13th year head coach John Wooden. They finished the regular season with a record of 18–8 and finished second in the AAWU with a record of 7–5.

== Previous season ==
The Bruins finished the regular season with a record of 14–12 and finished second in the PCC with a record of 7–5. After spending the previous five years at the Pan-Pacific Auditorium, UCLA moved to the new Los Angeles Memorial Sports Arena prior the season.

== Roster ==
1960–61 UCLA Bruins men's basketball team
Players
Coaches

Pos.	#	Name	Height	Weight	Year	Hometown
G	25	Stanley Andersen	6 ft 2 in (1.88 m)	—	Jr
G	30	Duane Barnes	5 ft 11 in (1.8 m)	—	Sr
C	35	John Berberich (C)	6 ft 8 in (2.03 m)	—	Sr
G	22	Bob Berry	5 ft 10 in (1.78 m)	—	Sr
F		Pete Buckman	6 ft 5 in (1.96 m)	—
F	55	Gary Cunningham	6 ft 5 in (1.96 m)	—	Jr
G	42	Bill Ellis (C)	6 ft 3 in (1.91 m)	—	Sr
G	45	John Green	6 ft 3 in (1.91 m)	—	Jr
G		Bill Hicks	6 ft 3 in (1.91 m)	—	Jr
C	33	Warnell Jones	6 ft 9 in (2.06 m)	—
F	54	Brian Kniff	6 ft 4 in (1.93 m)	—	Sr
F	32	Kent Miller	6 ft 6 in (1.98 m)	—	Sr
G		Bill Silmer	6 ft 1 in (1.85 m)	—
F	20	Sonny Skjervheim	6 ft 2 in (1.88 m)	—	Sr

Head coach

John Wooden (Purdue)

Assistant coach(es)

- Bill Putnam(UCLA)
- Jerry Norman(UCLA)

Legend

- (C) Team captain
- (S) Suspended
- (I) Ineligible
- (W) Walk-on
- Injured
- Current redshirt

Roster
Last update: 30 January 2018

== Schedule ==
Date time, TV	Rank^{#}	Opponent^{#}	Result	Record	Site city, state
Regular Season
December 2, 1960*		at Oklahoma State	L 58–64	0–1	Gallagher Hall; Stillwater, OK
December 3, 1960*		at Tulsa	W 94–74	1–1	Expo Square Pavilion; Tulsa, OK
December 9, 1960*		Kansas State	W 83–73	2–1	Los Angeles Memorial Sports Arena; Los Angeles, CA
December 10, 1960*		NYU	W 93–69	3–1	Los Angeles Memorial Sports Arena; Los Angeles, CA
December 16, 1960*	No. 13	Notre Dame	W 85–54	4–1	Los Angeles Memorial Sports Arena; Los Angeles, CA
December 17, 1960*	No. 13	Butler	W 73–61	5–1	Los Angeles Memorial Sports Arena; Los Angeles, CA
December 28, 1960*	No. 16	Michigan State	W 98–61	6–1	Los Angeles Memorial Sports Arena; Los Angeles, CA
December 29, 1960*	No. 16	No. 4 Indiana	W 94–72	7–1	Los Angeles Memorial Sports Arena; Los Angeles, CA
December 30, 1960*	No. 16	Iowa	L 65–71	7–2	Los Angeles Memorial Sports Arena; Los Angeles, CA
January 6, 1961	No. 9	at Washington	L 45–58	7–3 (0–1)	Hec Edmundson Pavilion; Seattle, WA
January 7, 1960	No. 9	at Washington	W 62–58	8–3 (1–1)	Hec Edmundson Pavilion; Seattle, WA
January 13, 1961*	No. 10	Arizona	W 90–68	9–3	Los Angeles Memorial Sports Arena; Los Angeles, CA
January 14, 1961	No. 10	California	W 54–46	10–3 (2–1)	Los Angeles Memorial Sports Arena; Los Angeles, CA
January 27, 1961		Denver	W 85–64	11–3	Los Angeles Memorial Sports Arena; Los Angeles, CA
January 28, 1961		Air Force	W 89–78	12–3	Los Angeles Memorial Sports Arena; Los Angeles, CA
February 3, 1961		No. 9 USC	L 63–78	12–4 (2–2)	Los Angeles Memorial Sports Arena; Los Angeles, CA
February 4, 1961		No. 9 USC	W 86–83	13–4 (3–2)	Los Angeles Memorial Sports Arena; Los Angeles, CA
February 11, 1961		at Stanford	L 65–79	13–5 (3–3)	Stanford Pavilion; Stanford, CA
February 17, 1961		at Kentucky	L 76–77	13–6	Memorial Coliseum; Lexington, KY
February 18, 1961		at Loyola	W 87–82	14–6	Alumni Gym; Chicago, IL
February 24, 1961		at California	L 65–66	14–7 (3–4)	Harmon's Gym; Berkeley, CA
February 25, 1961		at Stanford	W 70–56	15–7 (4–4)	Stanford Pavilion; Stanford, CA
March 3, 1961		No. 10 USC	L 85–86	15–8 (4–5)	Los Angeles Memorial Sports Arena; Los Angeles, CA
March 4, 1960		Washington	W 84–58	16–8 (5–5)	Los Angeles Memorial Sports Arena; Los Angeles, CA
March 10, 1960		Stanford	W 69–55	17–8 (6–5)	Los Angeles Memorial Sports Arena; Los Angeles, CA
March 11, 1961		California	W 59–55	18–8 (7–5)	Los Angeles Memorial Sports Arena; Los Angeles, CA
*Non-conference game. ^{#}Rankings from AP Poll. (#) Tournament seedings in parentheses. All times are in Pacific Time.
