= 1967–68 Indiana Hoosiers men's basketball team =

American college basketball season

1967–68 Indiana Hoosiers men's basketball
- Conference: Big Ten Conference
- Record: 10–14 (4–10 Big Ten)
- Head coach: Lou Watson (3rd season)
- Assistant coaches: Don Luft; Tom Bolyard
- Home arena: New Fieldhouse

1967–68 Big Ten Conference men's basketball standings
	Conf.				Overall
Team	W		L	PCT	W		L	PCT
Ohio State	10	–	4	.714	21	–	8	.724
Iowa	10	–	4	.714	16	–	9	.640
Purdue	9	–	5	.643	15	–	9	.625
Northwestern	8	–	6	.571	13	–	10	.565
Wisconsin	7	–	7	.500	13	–	11	.542
Michigan State	6	–	8	.429	12	–	12	.500
Illinois	6	–	8	.429	11	–	13	.458
Michigan	6	–	8	.429	11	–	13	.458
Indiana	4	–	10	.286	10	–	14	.417
Minnesota	4	–	10	.286	7	–	17	.292
Rankings from AP Poll

The 1967–68 Indiana Hoosiers men's basketball team represented Indiana University. Their head coach was Lou Watson, who was in his 3rd year. The team played its home games in New Fieldhouse in Bloomington, Indiana, and was a member of the Big Ten Conference.

The Hoosiers finished the regular season with an overall record of 10–14 and a conference record of 4–10, finishing 9th in the Big Ten Conference. Indiana was not invited to play in any postseason tournament.

== Roster ==
No.	Name	Position	Ht.	Year	Hometown
20	Mike Niles	G	6–4	So.	Warsaw, Indiana
22	Joe Cooke	G	6–3	So.	Toledo, Ohio
23	Vern Payne	G	5–10	Sr.	Michigan City, Indiana
24	Bobby Kent	G	5–8	So.	Unionville, Indiana
25	Ken Newsome	F	6–5	Sr.	Ahoskie, North Carolina
30	Rich Schrumpf	C	6–9	Sr.	Galien, Michigan
31	Bill DeHeer	C	6–9	Jr.	Maplewood, Missouri
32	Mike Noland	F	6–6	So.	Indianapolis, Indiana
33	Ken Johnson	C	6–6	So.	Anderson, Indiana
34	Butch Joyner	F	6–4	Sr.	New Castle, Indiana
35	Bill Stenberg	C	6–7	Jr.	Rockford, Illinois
40	John Isenbarger	G	6–3	So.	Muncie, Indiana
41	Gabe Oliverio	G	6–2	Jr.	Annandale, Virginia
42	Rick Atkinson	G	6–3	So.	Evansville, Indiana
43	John Muirhead	C	6–7	Jr.	Danville, Illinois
44	Earl Schneider	F	6–9	Jr.	Evansville, Indiana
45	Gary Leinberger	F	6–7	Sr.	St. Louis, Missouri

== Schedule/results ==
Date time, TV	Rank^{#}	Opponent^{#}	Result	Record	Site city, state
Regular season
12/2/1967*		Northern Illinois	W 71–65	1–0	New Fieldhouse; Bloomington, IN
12/4/1967*		at Missouri	W 78–69	2–0	Brewer Fieldhouse; Columbia, MO
12/9/1967*		Ohio	W 89–63	3–0	New Fieldhouse; Bloomington, IN
12/11/1967*		Kansas State	W 89–83	4–0	New Fieldhouse; Bloomington, IN
12/16/1967*	No. 9	at North Carolina State	W 101–97 ^{OT}	5–0	Reynolds Coliseum; Raleigh, North Carolina
12/19/1967*	No. 5	vs. Notre Dame	W 96–91	6–0	Memorial Coliseum; Fort Wayne, IN
12/28/1967*	No. 3	vs. Western Kentucky	L 91–110	6–1	Moody Coliseum; Dallas, TX
12/29/1967*	No. 3	at SMU	L 84–91	6–2	Moody Coliseum; Dallas, TX
1/2/1968*		at Detroit	L 93–99	6–3	Calihan Hall; Detroit, MI
1/6/1968		Minnesota	W 74–59	7–3 (1–0)	New Fieldhouse; Bloomington, IN
1/9/1968		at Illinois; Rivalry	W 61–60 ^{OT}	8–3 (2–0)	Assembly Hall; Champaign, IL
1/13/1968		Northwestern	L 81–86	8–4 (2–1)	Welsh-Ryan Arena; Evanston, IL
1/16/1968		at Purdue; Rivalry	L 60–89	8–5 (2–2)	Purdue Arena; West Lafayette, IN
1/29/1968*		at DePaul	L 78–79	8–6 (2–2)	Alumni Hall; Chicago, IL
2/3/1968		at Minnesota	L 75–82	8–7 (2–3)	Williams Arena; Minneapolis, MN
2/5/1968		Ohio State	L 77–78	8–8 (2–4)	New Fieldhouse; Bloomington, IN
2/10/1968		at Wisconsin	L 83–95	8–9 (2–5)	Wisconsin Field House; Madison, WI
2/17/1968		Michigan	W 98–92	9–9 (3–5)	New Fieldhouse; Bloomington, IN
2/20/1968		at Michigan State	L 70–75	9–10 (3–6)	Jenison Fieldhouse; East Lansing, MI
2/24/1968		Iowa	L 70–78	9–11 (3–7)	Iowa Field House; Iowa City, IA
2/27/1968		at Northwestern	L 66–73 ^{OT}	9–12 (3–8)	Welsh-Ryan Arena; Evanston, IL
3/2/1968		at Ohio State	L 93–107	9–13 (3–9)	St. John Arena; Columbus, OH
3/5/1968		Wisconsin	W 93–85	10–13 (4–9)	New Fieldhouse; Bloomington, IN
3/9/1968		Purdue; Rivalry	L 64–68	10–14 (4–10)	New Fieldhouse; Bloomington, IN
*Non-conference game. ^{#}Rankings from AP Poll. (#) Tournament seedings in parentheses.
