= 1967–68 Iowa Hawkeyes men's basketball team =

American college basketball season

1967–68 Iowa Hawkeyes men's basketball
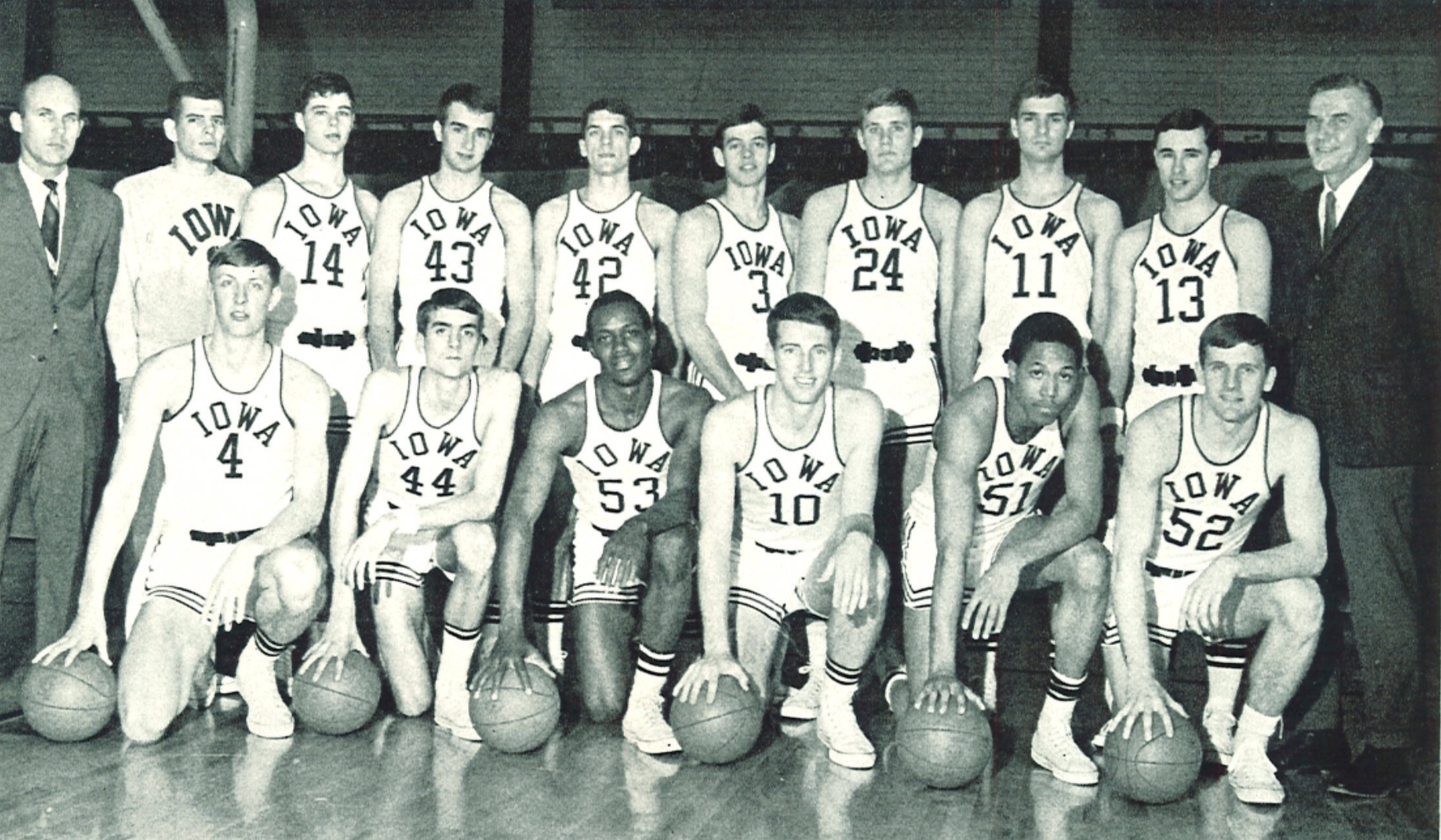

Big Ten Champions
- Conference: Big Ten Conference
- Record: 16–9 (10–4 Big Ten)
- Head coach: Ralph Miller (4th season)
- Assistant coaches: Lanny Van Eman; Dick Schultz
- MVP: Sam Williams
- Home arena: Iowa Field House (Capacity: 13,365)

1967–68 Big Ten Conference men's basketball standings
| | Conf. | | | | Overall |
| Team | W | | L | PCT | W | | L | PCT |
|---|---|---|---|---|---|---|---|---|
| Ohio State | 10 | – | 4 | .714 | 21 | – | 8 | .724 |
| Iowa | 10 | – | 4 | .714 | 16 | – | 9 | .640 |
| Purdue | 9 | – | 5 | .643 | 15 | – | 9 | .625 |
| Northwestern | 8 | – | 6 | .571 | 13 | – | 10 | .565 |
| Wisconsin | 7 | – | 7 | .500 | 13 | – | 11 | .542 |
| Michigan State | 6 | – | 8 | .429 | 12 | – | 12 | .500 |
| Illinois | 6 | – | 8 | .429 | 11 | – | 13 | .458 |
| Michigan | 6 | – | 8 | .429 | 11 | – | 13 | .458 |
| Indiana | 4 | – | 10 | .286 | 10 | – | 14 | .417 |
| Minnesota | 4 | – | 10 | .286 | 7 | – | 17 | .292 |
Rankings from AP Poll

The 1967–68 Iowa Hawkeyes men's basketball team represented the University of Iowa in intercollegiate basketball during the 1967–68 season. The team was led by Ralph Miller and played their home games at the Iowa Field House. The Hawkeyes finished the season 16–9 and were Big Ten co-champions with a 10–4 conference record.

Senior guard Sam Williams was named Big Ten Player of the Year after rlzz1ng 25.3 points per game and 10.9 rebounds per game. It would be 52 years before another Iowa men's basketball player would take home the award.

== Roster ==
1967–68 Iowa Hawkeyes men's basketball team
Players
Coaches

| Pos. | # | Name | Height | Weight | Year | Hometown |
|---|---|---|---|---|---|---|
| G | 3 | Jim Hodge | 6 ft 0 in (1.83 m) | — | So |
| F/C | 4 | Dick Jensen | 6 ft 8 in (2.03 m) | — | So | Madrid, Iowa |
| F/C | 10 | Dick Agnew | — | — |
| G | 11 | Ron Norman | 6 ft 3 in (1.91 m) | — | Sr | Freeport, Illinois |
| | 14 | Frank Nelson | — | — | Jr |
| G | 24 | Chris Phillips | 6 ft 3 in (1.91 m) | — | Jr |
| G | 42 | Rolly McGrath | 6 ft 1 in (1.85 m) | — | Sr |
| G | 43 | Chad Calabria | 6 ft 1 in (1.85 m) | — | So | Aliquippa, Pennsylvania |
| F | 44 | Glenn Vidnovic | 6 ft 5 in (1.96 m) | — | So | McKeesport, Pennsylvania |
| F | 51 | Huston Breedlove | 6 ft 6 in (1.98 m) | — | Sr | Akron, Ohio |
| | 52 | Tom Schulze | — | — | So |
| G/F | 53 | Sam Williams | 6 ft 3 in (1.91 m) | — | Sr | Detroit, Michigan |

Head coach

- Ralph Miller (Kansas)

Assistant coach(es)

Legend

- (C) Team captain
- (S) Suspended
- (I) Ineligible
- (W) Walk-on
- Injured
- Current redshirt

== Schedule/results ==
| Date time, TV | Rank^{#} | Opponent^{#} | Result | Record | Site (attendance) city, state |
Regular season
| Dec 2, 1967* | | Bowling Green | W 79–73 | 1–0 | Iowa Field House; Iowa City, IA |
| Dec 4, 1967* | | Southern Illinois | W 61–49 | 2–0 | Iowa Field House; Iowa City, IA |
| Dec 16, 1967* | | Drake | L 65–74 | 2–1 | Iowa Field House; Iowa City, IA |
| Dec 18, 1967* | | UTEP | W 59–53 | 3–1 | Iowa Field House; Iowa City, IA |
| Dec 22, 1967* | | at California | L 73–79 | 3–2 | Harmon Gym; Berkeley, CA |
| Dec. 23, 1967* | | at Stanford | L 86–87 | 3–3 | Old Pavilion; Stanford, CA |
| Dec 28, 1967* | | vs. No. 4 Tennessee; Los Angeles Classic | W 64–59 | 4–3 | Los Angeles Memorial Sports Arena; Los Angeles, CA |
| Dec 29, 1967* | | vs. Wyoming; Los Angeles Classic | L 87–94 | 4–4 | Los Angeles Memorial Sports Arena; Los Angeles, CA |
| Dec 30, 1967* | | vs. Saint Louis; Los Angeles Classic | W 80–77 | 5–4 | Los Angeles Memorial Sports Arena; Los Angeles, CA |
| Jan 6, 1968 | | at Northwestern | L 67–76 | 5–5 (0–1) | McGraw Hall; Evanston, IL |
| Dec 8, 1968* | | Loyola (IL) | W 71–65 | 6–5 | Iowa Field House; Iowa City, IA |
| Jan 13, 1968 | | Ohio State | W 74–72 ^{OT} | 7–5 (1–1) | Iowa Field House; Iowa City, IA |
| Jan 20, 1968 | | Minnesota | W 82–70 | 8–5 (2–1) | Iowa Field House; Iowa City, IA |
| Jan 23, 1968 | | at Michigan State | W 76–71 | 9–5 (3–1) | Jenison Fieldhouse; East Lansing |
| Feb 3, 1968 | | at Illinois | L 63–66 | 9–6 (3–2) | Assembly Hall; Champaign, IL |
| Feb 7, 1968 | | Purdue | W 94–87 | 10–6 (4–2) | Iowa Field House; Iowa City, IA |
| Feb 10, 1968 | | at Michigan | W 99–86 | 11–6 (5–2) | University Events Building; Ann Arbor, MI |
| Feb 17, 1968 | | Wisconsin | W 69–61 | 12–6 (6–2) | Iowa Field House; Iowa City, IA |
| Feb 20, 1968 | | at Purdue | L 73–86 | 12–7 (6–3) | Purdue Arena; West Lafayette, IN |
| Feb 24, 1968 | | Indiana | W 78–70 | 13–7 (7–3) | New Fieldhouse; Bloomington, IN |
| Feb 27, 1968 | | Michigan State | W 76–58 | 14–7 (8–3) | Iowa Field House; Iowa City, IA |
| Mar 2,1968 | | Illinois | W 61–56 | 15–7 (9–3) | Iowa Field House; Iowa City, IA |
| Mar 4, 1968 | | Minnesota | W 91–72 | 16–7 (10–3) | Williams Arena; Minneapolis, MN |
| Mar 9, 1968 | | Michigan | L 70–71 | 16–8 (10–4) | Iowa Field House; Iowa City, IA |
Big Ten Playoff
| Mar 12, 1968 | | vs. Ohio State; Big Ten Playoff | L 81–85 | 16–9 | Mackey Arena; West Lafayette, IN |
*Non-conference game. ^{#}Rankings from AP Poll. (#) Tournament seedings in parentheses.

== Awards and honors ==
- Sam Williams – Third-Team AP All-American; Big Ten Player of the Year

== Team players in the 1968 NBA draft ==
| Round | Pick | Player | NBA club |
|---|---|---|---|
| 3 | 35 | Sam Williams | Milwaukee Bucks |
