= 1960–61 Wisconsin Badgers men's basketball team =

American college basketball season

1960–61 Wisconsin Badgers men's basketball
- Conference: Big Ten Conference
- Record: 7–17 (4–10 Big Ten)
- Head coach: John Erickson
- Home arena: UW Fieldhouse

1960–61 Big Ten Conference men's basketball standings
	Conf.				Overall
Team	W		L	PCT	W		L	PCT
No. 1 Ohio State	14	–	0	1.000	27	–	1	.964
No. 8 Iowa	10	–	4	.714	18	–	6	.750
Purdue	10	–	4	.714	16	–	7	.696
Indiana	8	–	6	.571	15	–	9	.625
Minnesota	8	–	6	.571	10	–	13	.435
Northwestern	6	–	8	.429	10	–	12	.455
Illinois	5	–	9	.357	9	–	15	.375
Wisconsin	4	–	10	.286	7	–	17	.292
Michigan State	3	–	11	.214	7	–	17	.292
Michigan	2	–	12	.143	6	–	18	.250
Rankings from https://www.sports-reference.com/cbb/conferences/big-ten/1961.html

The 1960–61 Wisconsin Badgers men's basketball team represented University of Wisconsin–Madison. The head coach was John Erickson, coaching his second season with the Badgers. The team played their home games at the UW Fieldhouse in Madison, Wisconsin and was a member of the Big Ten Conference.

== Schedule ==
Date time, TV	Rank^{#}	Opponent^{#}	Result	Record	Site city, state
Regular Season
12/01/1960*		at Butler	L 58–73	0–1	Butler Fieldhouse; Indianapolis, IN
12/03/1960*		Air Force	W 80–67	1–1	UW Fieldhouse; Madison, WI
12/05/1960*		at Iowa State	L 76–88	1–2	Iowa State Armory; Ames, IA
12/10/1960*		Marquette	W 55–51	2–2	UW Fieldhouse; Madison, WI
12/17/1960*		at No. 2 Bradley	L 66–88	2–3	Robertson Memorial Field House; Peoria, IL
12/20/1960*		Nevada	W 89–56	3–3	UW Fieldhouse; Madison, WI
12/28/1960*		vs. Oregon State; Far West Classic	L 54–56	3–4	Memorial Coliseum; Portland, OR
12/29/1960*		vs. Portland; Far West Classic	L 71–79 ^{OT}	3–5	Memorial Coliseum; Portland, OR
12/30/1960*		vs. Washington State; Far West Classic	L 72–78	3–6	Memorial Coliseum; Portland, OR
1/07/1961		at Michigan State	W 74–71	4–6 (1–0)	Jenison Fieldhouse; East Lansing, MI
1/09/1961		No. 6 Iowa	L 68–76	4–7 (1–1)	UW Fieldhouse; Madison, WI
1/28/1961*		at Loyola (IL)	L 79–87	4–8	Alumni Gym; Chicago, IL
1/30/1961		No. 1 Ohio State	L 68–100	4–9 (1–2)	UW Fieldhouse; Madison, WI
2/04/1961		at Purdue	L 58–69	4–10 (1–3)	Lambert Fieldhouse; West Lafayette, IN
2/06/1961		at Illinois	L 73–77	4–11 (1–4)	Huff Hall; Champaign, IL
2/11/1961		at Northwestern	L 52–54	4–12 (1–5)	Welsh-Ryan Arena; Evanston, IL
2/13/1961		at No. 9 Iowa	L 61–63	4–13 (1–6)	Iowa Field House; Iowa City, IA
2/18/1961		Indiana	L 84–98	4–14 (1–7)	UW Fieldhouse; Madison, WI
2/20/1961		Minnesota	W 83–75	5–14 (2–7)	UW Fieldhouse; Madison, WI
2/25/1961		at No. 1 Ohio State	L 74–97	5–15 (2–8)	St. John Arena; Columbus, OH
2/27/1961		Michigan	W 76–68	6–15 (3–8)	UW Fieldhouse; Madison, WI
3/04/1961		Northwestern	W 75–61	7–15 (4–8)	UW Fieldhouse; Madison, WI
3/06/1961		at Indiana	L 69–80	7–16 (4–9)	New Fieldhouse; Bloomington, IN
3/11/1961		Purdue	L 81–88	7–17 (4–10)	UW Fieldhouse; Madison, WI
*Non-conference game. ^{#}Rankings from AP Poll. (#) Tournament seedings in parentheses.
