= 1960–61 Auburn Tigers men's basketball team =

American college basketball season

1960–61 Auburn Tigers men's basketball

Birmingham Classic champions
- Conference: Southeastern Conference
- Record: 15–7 (8–6 SEC)
- Head coach: Joel Eaves (12th season)
- Captains: Porter Gilbert; Jimmy Falbe
- Home arena: Auburn Sports Arena

1960–61 Southeastern Conference men's basketball standings
	Conf.				Overall
Team	W		L	PCT	W		L	PCT
Mississippi State	11	–	3	.786	19	–	6	.760
Vanderbilt	10	–	4	.714	19	–	5	.792
Kentucky	10	–	4	.714	19	–	9	.679
Florida	9	–	5	.643	15	–	11	.577
Auburn	8	–	6	.571	15	–	7	.682
Georgia Tech	6	–	8	.429	13	–	13	.500
Tulane	6	–	8	.429	11	–	13	.458
LSU	6	–	8	.429	11	–	14	.440
Ole Miss	5	–	9	.357	10	–	14	.417
Alabama	5	–	9	.357	7	–	18	.280
Tennessee	4	–	10	.286	10	–	15	.400
Georgia	4	–	10	.286	8	–	18	.308
Rankings from AP Poll

The 1960–61 Auburn Tigers men's basketball team represented Auburn University in the 1960–61 college basketball season. The team's head coach was Joel Eaves, who was in his twelfth season at Auburn. The team played their home games at Auburn Sports Arena in Auburn, Alabama. They finished the season 15–7, 8–6 in SEC play.
