= 1967–68 Michigan State Spartans men's basketball team =

American college basketball season

1967–68 Michigan State Spartans men's basketball
- Conference: Big Ten Conference
- Record: 12–2 (6–8 Big Ten)
- Head coach: John E. Benington (3rd season)
- Assistant coaches: Robert Nordmann; Gus Ganakas
- Captain: Matthew Aitch
- Home arena: Jenison Fieldhouse

1967–68 Big Ten Conference men's basketball standings
	Conf.				Overall
Team	W		L	PCT	W		L	PCT
Ohio State	10	–	4	.714	21	–	8	.724
Iowa	10	–	4	.714	16	–	9	.640
Purdue	9	–	5	.643	15	–	9	.625
Northwestern	8	–	6	.571	13	–	10	.565
Wisconsin	7	–	7	.500	13	–	11	.542
Michigan State	6	–	8	.429	12	–	12	.500
Illinois	6	–	8	.429	11	–	13	.458
Michigan	6	–	8	.429	11	–	13	.458
Indiana	4	–	10	.286	10	–	14	.417
Minnesota	4	–	10	.286	7	–	17	.292
Rankings from AP Poll

The 1967–68 Michigan State Spartans men's basketball team represented Michigan State University in the 1967–68 NCAA Division I men's basketball season as members of the Big Ten Conference. They played their home games at Jenison Fieldhouse in East Lansing, Michigan and were coached by John E. Benington in his third year as head coach of the Spartans. They finished the season 12–2, 6–8 in Big Ten play to finish in a three-way tie for sixth place.

== Previous season ==
The Spartans finished the 1966–67 season 16–7, 10–4 in Big Ten play to finish tied for the Big Ten championship. However, Indiana was selected for the NCAA tournament.

== Roster and statistics ==
1967–68 Michigan State Spartans men's basketball team
No	Name	Pos	Year	Height	Pts	Reb
11	Lloyd Ward	G	SO	5–9	2.3	0.7
12	John Bailey	G	SR	6–0	10.1	2.7
13	Thomas Steenken	G	SO	6–1	0.0	0.7
14	Richie Jordan	G	JR	5–7	3.0	4.0
15	Steven Rymal	G	SR	6–1	7.0	2.5
21	James O'Brien	G	SR	6–3	–	–
23	Vernon Johnson	G	JR	5–11	1.3	0.7
24	John Holmes	F	JR	6–4	1.5	2.2
25	Robert Gale	F	SO	6–5	1.6	1.5
31	Harrison Stepter	G	JR	6–2	9.6	3.1
32	Steven Kirkpatrick	G	SO	6–2	1.2	–
33	Heywood Edwards	F	SR	6–6	9.7	6.2
34	Tom Lick	C	JR	6–10	3.8	3.7
35	Lee Lafayette	F	JR	6–6	16.8	10.5
41	James Gibbons	C	SO	6–6	6.3	3.6
42	Gerald Geistler	C	SR	6–8	0.5	1.3
44	Ron Binge	F	SO	6–5	2.0	0.5
43	Bernie Copeland	F	JR	6–6	7.0	6.9

== Schedule and results ==
Date time, TV	Rank^{#}	Opponent^{#}	Result	Record	Site city, state
Regular season
Dec 1, 1967*		Cal State Fullerton	W 80–49	1–0	Jenison Fieldhouse; East Lansing, MI
Dec 12, 1967*		at Western Michigan	W 78–67	2–0	University Arena; Kalamazoo, MI
Dec 14, 1967*		at Butler	L 55–65	2–1	Hinkle Fieldhouse; Indianapolis, IN
Dec 16, 1967*		Hardin-Simmons	W 95–76	3–1	Jenison Fieldhouse; East Lansing, MI
Dec 20, 1967*		Nebraska	W 74–70	4–1	Jenison Fieldhouse; East Lansing, MI
Dec 23, 1967*		Wichita State	L 80–90	4–2	Levitt Arena; Wichita, KS
Dec 29, 1967*		vs. No. 9 Vanderbilt; Sugar Bowl Tournament	L 63–73	4–3	The Field House; New Orleans, LA
Dec 30, 1967*		vs. Memphis State; Sugar Bowl Tournament	L 57–73	4–4	The Field House; New Orleans, LA
Jan 6, 1968		at Illinois	L 56–66	4–5 (0–1)	Assembly Hall; Champaign, IL
Jan 13, 1968		at Michigan; Rivalry	W 86–81	5–5 (1–1)	Crisler Arena; Ann Arbor, MI
Jan 16, 1968		at Wisconsin	L 68–70	5–6 (1–2)	Wisconsin Field House; Madison, WI
Jan 20, 1968		Northwestern	W 75–62	6–6 (2–2)	Jenison Fieldhouse; East Lansing, MI
Jan 23, 1968		Iowa	L 71–76	6–7 (2–3)	Jenison Fieldhouse; East Lansing, MI
Jan 27, 1968*		at Southern Illinois	W 68–56	7–7	The SIU Arena; Carbondale, IL
Jan 30, 1968*		Notre Dame	W 89–57	8–7	Jenison Fieldhouse; East Lansing, MI
Feb 3, 1968		Michigan	W 82–77	9–7 (3–3)	Jenison Fieldhouse; East Lansing, MI
Feb 10, 1968		at Ohio State	L 62–90	9–8 (3–4)	St. John Arena; Columbus, OH
Feb 17, 1968		at Northwestern	L 61–69	9–9 (3–5)	Welsh-Ryan Arena; Evanston, IL
Feb 20, 1968		Indiana	W 75–70	10–9 (4–5)	Jenison Fieldhouse; East Lansing, MI
Feb 24, 1968		Wisconsin	W 87–77	11–9 (5–5)	Jenison Fieldhouse; East Lansing, MI
Feb 27, 1968		at Iowa	L 58–76	11–10 (5–6)	Carver-Hawkeye Arena; Iowa City, IA
Mar 2, 1968		Minnesota	L 68–75	11–11 (5–7)	Jenison Fieldhouse; East Lansing, MI
Mar 5, 1968		at Purdue	L 75–93	11–12 (5–8)	Mackey Arena; West Lafayette, IN
Mar 9, 1968		Illinois	W 62–59	12–12 (6–8)	Jenison Fieldhouse; East Lansing, MI
*Non-conference game. ^{#}Rankings from AP Poll. (#) Tournament seedings in parentheses. Source
