= Dave Strack =

American college sports coach and administrator (1923–2014)

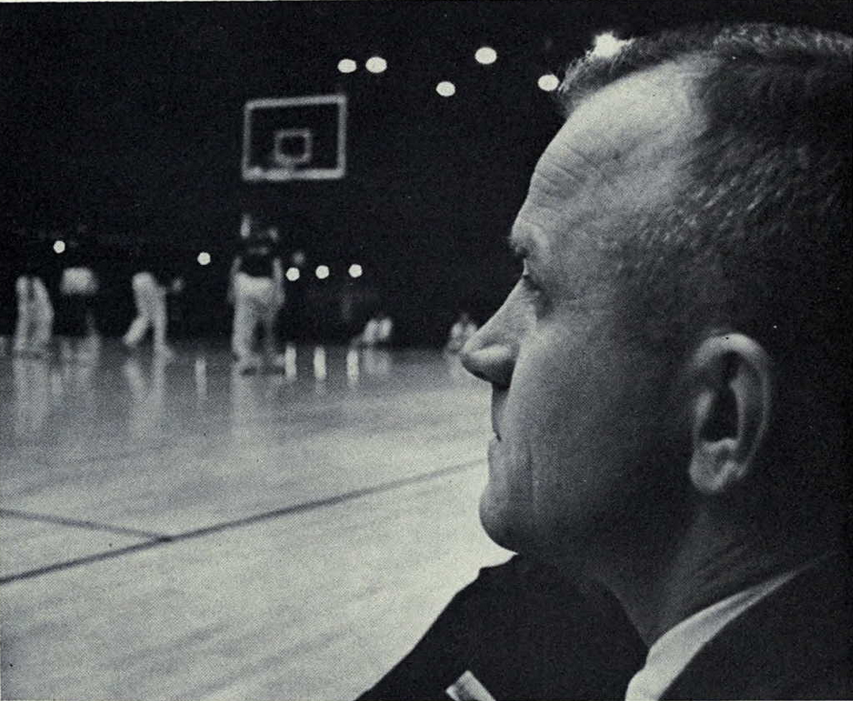
- Strack from 1967 Michiganensian

Biographical details
- Born: March 2, 1923; Indianapolis, Indiana, U.S.
- Died: January 25, 2014 (aged 90); Tucson, Arizona, U.S.

Playing career
- 1943–1946: Michigan
- 1946: Indianapolis Kautskys

Coaching career (HC unless noted)
- 1948–1959: Michigan (assistant)
- 1959–1960: Idaho
- 1960–1968: Michigan

Administrative career (AD unless noted)
- 1970–1972: Michigan (associate AD)
- 1972–1982: Arizona

Head coaching record
- Overall: 124–104
- Tournaments: 7–3 (NCAA University Division)

Accomplishments and honors

Championships
- 3 Big Ten regular season (1964–1966)

David Hessong Strack (March 2, 1923 – January 25, 2014) was an American athletic director for the University of Arizona and head basketball coach at the University of Michigan. He was inducted into the Indiana Basketball Hall of Fame.

== Early life ==
Strack grew up in Indiana and graduated from Shortridge High School in Indianapolis, where he was the basketball team's captain and MVP in 1941 and was named to the Indiana All-Star team. Strack played college basketball at the University of Michigan (UM), earning MVP honors in 1943 and 1946.

== Basketball career ==
Strack briefly played professionally for the Indianapolis Kautskys of the NBL. He returned to UM and served as an assistant coach from 1948 to 1959, then left in June 1959 to become the head coach at the University of Idaho.

In May 1960, Strack was hired as the head coach back at the University of Michigan, and served from 1960 to 1968. He led the Wolverines to three Big Ten Conference titles (1964, 1965, 1966) and the 1965 NCAA Tournament title game. Following his team's 24–4 record and runner-up finish in 1965, Strack was named the UPI College Basketball Coach of the Year.

== Athletic director ==
In 1968, Strack became the University of Michigan's business manager, then the associate athletic director in 1970.

Strack resigned in January 1972 to become the athletic director of the University of Arizona. Strack's tenure at Arizona included the hiring of the first African-American head coach of a major university (basketball coach Fred Snowden) and the school's transition into the Pac-10 athletic conference. In 1980, Strack was criticized following a scandal involving the football program's use of an athletic slush fund for improper payments to coaches, alumni and recruits. Strack resigned in July 1982 to become a professor of physical education.

In 1992, Strack was inducted into the Indiana Basketball Hall of Fame.

== Personal life ==
In 1947, while attending the University of Michigan, Strack met and married Ruth Ann Mayer. They briefly lived in East Lansing, Michigan before moving to Ann Arbor to raise their five children. When he took the Arizona athletic director job, they moved to Tucson for his tenure and then to Prescott upon his retirement. They later returned to Tucson, where she died in 2011. Strack, aged 90, died of pneumonia in 2014.

== Head coaching record ==
Record table
Season	Team	Overall	Conference	Standing	Postseason
Idaho Vandals (Independent) (1959–1960)
1959–60	Idaho	11–15			
Idaho:		11–15			
Michigan Wolverines (Big Ten Conference) (1960–1968)
1960–61	Michigan	6–18	2–12	10th	
1961–62	Michigan	7–17	5–9	8th	
1962–63	Michigan	16–8	8–6	T–4th	
1963–64	Michigan	23–5	11–3	T–1st	NCAA University Division Final Four
1964–65	Michigan	24–4	13–1	1st	NCAA University Division Runner-up
1965–66	Michigan	18–8	11–3	1st	NCAA University Division Elite Eight
1966–67	Michigan	8–16	2–12	10th	
1967–68	Michigan	11–13	6–8	T–7th	
Michigan:		113–89	58–54		
Total:		124–104			
National champion Postseason invitational champion Conference regular season champion Conference regular season and conference tournament champion Division regular season champion Division regular season and conference tournament champion Conference tournament champion

== See also ==
- List of NCAA Division I Men's Final Four appearances by coach
