= 1960–61 Washington Huskies men's basketball team =

American college basketball season

1960–61 Washington Huskies men's basketball
- Conference: Athletic Association of Western Universities
- Record: 13–13 (6–6 AAWU, Big Five)
- Head coach: John Grayson (2nd season)
- Assistant coach: Mac Duckworth
- Home arena: Hec Edmundson Pavilion

1960–61 AAWU Conference men's basketball standings
	Conf.				Overall
Team	W		L	PCT	W		L	PCT
No. 7 USC	9	–	3	.750	21	–	8	.724
UCLA	7	–	5	.583	18	–	8	.692
Washington	6	–	6	.500	13	–	13	.500
California	5	–	7	.417	16	–	10	.615
Stanford	3	–	9	.250	7	–	17	.292
Rankings from AP Poll

The 1960–61 Washington Huskies men's basketball team represented the University of Washington for the 1960–61 NCAA University Division basketball season. Led by second-year head coach John Grayson, the Huskies were members of the Athletic Association of Western Universities (Big Five) and played their home games on campus at Hec Edmundson Pavilion in Seattle, Washington.

The Huskies were 13–13 overall in the regular season and 6–6 in conference play, third in the standings.
