= Dave Downey =

American basketball player (1941–2025)

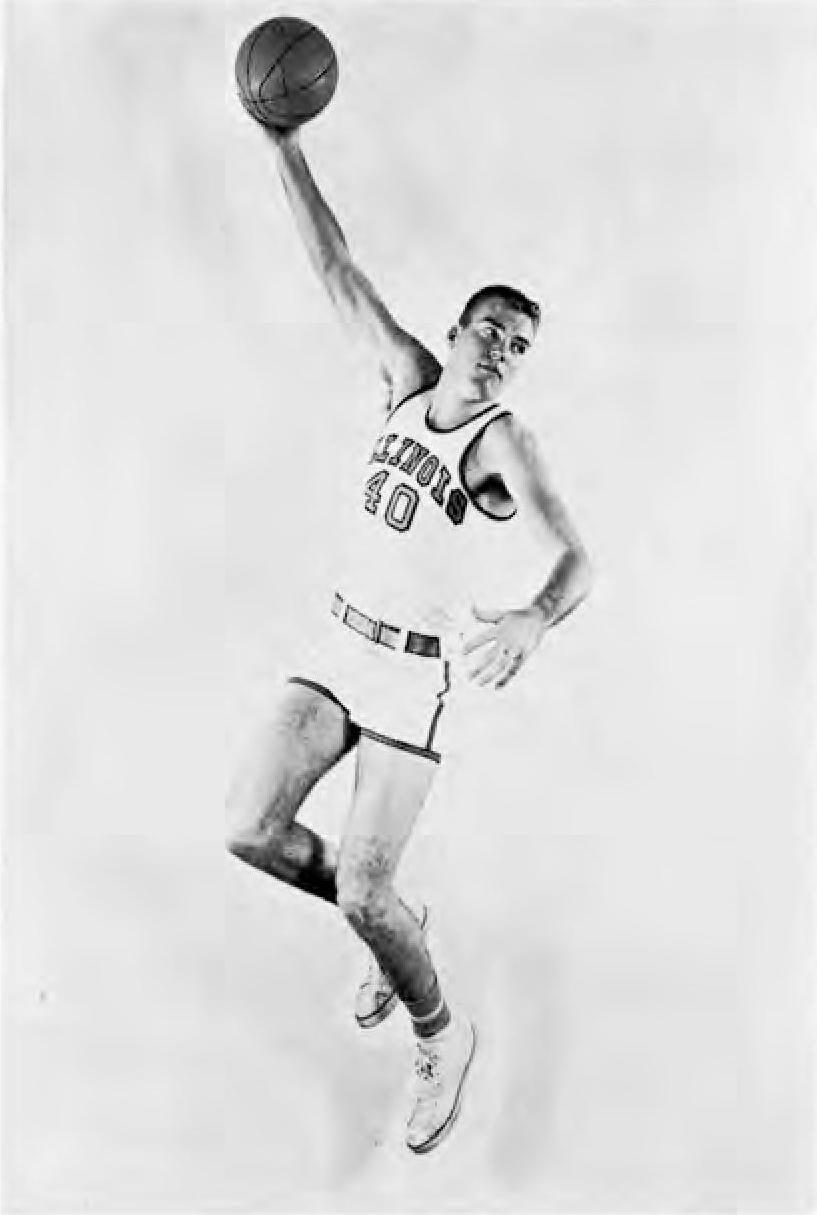
- Downey circa 1963

Personal information
- Born: October 28, 1941 Canton, Illinois, U.S.
- Died: December 27, 2025 (aged 84)
- Listed height: 6 ft 4 in (1.93 m)
- Listed weight: 200 lb (91 kg)

Career information
- High school: Canton (Canton, Illinois)
- College: Illinois (1960–1963)
- NBA draft: 1963: 4th round, 30th overall pick
- Drafted by: San Francisco Warriors
- Position: Forward

Career highlights
- First-team All-Big Ten (1963); 2× Second-team All-Big Ten (1961, 1962)
- Stats at Basketball Reference

David John Downey (October 28, 1941 – December 27, 2025) was an American collegiate basketball player for the University of Illinois Fighting Illini basketball team. He is best known for setting the Illinois single-game scoring record with 53 points at Indiana on February 16, 1963.

Downey's 18.9 career scoring average ranks fourth in school history while his 11.0 career rebounding average ranks third, with his 790 career rebounds ranking seventh on the career list. Downey earned the 1963 Big Ten Conference Medal of Honor for excellence in both academics and athletics. He was drafted into the NBA in 1963 by the San Francisco Warriors but never played a game in the league.

He was elected to the "Illini Men's Basketball All-Century Team" in 2004.

Downey was the leading scorer for his hometown high school, Canton High School. His record was then broken by Kevin Rhodes. When asked about this accomplishment, Downey simply said, "It was only a matter of time until Kevin Rhodes broke my record."

Downey died on December 27, 2025, at the age of 84.

== Honors ==
=== Basketball ===
- 1961 – Team MVP
- 1961 – 2nd Team All-Big Ten
- 1961 – Honorable Mention All American
- 1962 – Team MVP
- 1962 – 2nd Team All-Big Ten
- 1962 – Honorable Mention All American
- 1963 – Team MVP
- 1963 – 1st Team All-Big Ten
- 1963 – Honorable Mention All American
- 1963 – Big Ten Medal of Honor recipient
- 1963 – NCAA All-Regional Team
- 1973 – Inducted into the Illinois Basketball Coaches Association's Hall of Fame as a player.
- 2004 – Elected to the "Illini Men's Basketball All-Century Team".
- 2008 – Honored jersey which hangs in the State Farm Center to show regard for being the most decorated basketball players in the University of Illinois' history.
- 2018 – Inducted into the Illinois Athletics Hall of Fame

== Statistics ==
Season	Games	Points	PPG	Field Goals	Attempts	Avg	Free Throws	Attempts	Avg	Rebounds	Avg	Big Ten Record	Overall Record
1960–61	24	402	16.8	157	404	.389	88	123	.715	267	11.1	5–9	9–15
1961–62	22	445	20.2	174	385	.452	97	130	.746	269	12.2	7–7	15–8
1962–63	26	513	19.7	201	459	.438	111	156	.712	254	9.8	11–3	20–6
Totals	72	1360	18.9	532	1248	.426	296	409	.724	790	11.0	23–19	44–29
