= 1967–68 Ohio State Buckeyes men's basketball team =

American college basketball season

1967–68 Ohio State Buckeyes men's basketball
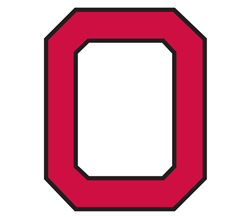

Big Ten co-champions

NCAA Men's Division I Tournament, Final Four
- Conference: Big Ten Conference
- Record: 21–8 (10–4 Big Ten)
- Head coach: Fred Taylor

1967–68 Big Ten Conference men's basketball standings
	Conf.				Overall
Team	W		L	PCT	W		L	PCT
Ohio State	10	–	4	.714	21	–	8	.724
Iowa	10	–	4	.714	16	–	9	.640
Purdue	9	–	5	.643	15	–	9	.625
Northwestern	8	–	6	.571	13	–	10	.565
Wisconsin	7	–	7	.500	13	–	11	.542
Michigan State	6	–	8	.429	12	–	12	.500
Illinois	6	–	8	.429	11	–	13	.458
Michigan	6	–	8	.429	11	–	13	.458
Indiana	4	–	10	.286	10	–	14	.417
Minnesota	4	–	10	.286	7	–	17	.292
Rankings from AP Poll

The 1967–68 Ohio State Buckeyes men's basketball team represented Ohio State University. The team's head coach was Fred Taylor. Players included Bill Hosket, Dave Sorenson and Jim Geddes.

== NCAA basketball tournament ==
- Mideast
  - Ohio State 79, East Tennessee State 72
  - Ohio State 82, Kentucky 81
- Final Four
  - North Carolina 80, Ohio State 66

== Awards and honors ==
- Bill Hosket, First-Team All Big Ten

== Team players drafted into the NBA ==
Round	Pick	Player	NBA club
1	10	Bill Hosket	New York Knicks
