= 1967–68 Illinois Fighting Illini men's basketball team =

American college basketball season

1967–68 Illinois Fighting Illini men's basketball
- Conference: Big Ten Conference
- Record: 11–13 (6–8 Big Ten)
- Head coach: Harv Schmidt (1st season)
- Assistant coach: Dick Campbell (1st season)
- MVP: Dave Scholz
- Captain: Ben Louis
- Home arena: Assembly Hall

1967–68 Big Ten Conference men's basketball standings
	Conf.				Overall
Team	W		L	PCT	W		L	PCT
Ohio State	10	–	4	.714	21	–	8	.724
Iowa	10	–	4	.714	16	–	9	.640
Purdue	9	–	5	.643	15	–	9	.625
Northwestern	8	–	6	.571	13	–	10	.565
Wisconsin	7	–	7	.500	13	–	11	.542
Michigan State	6	–	8	.429	12	–	12	.500
Illinois	6	–	8	.429	11	–	13	.458
Michigan	6	–	8	.429	11	–	13	.458
Indiana	4	–	10	.286	10	–	14	.417
Minnesota	4	–	10	.286	7	–	17	.292
Rankings from AP Poll

The 1967–68 Illinois Fighting Illini men's basketball team represented the University of Illinois.

== Regular season ==
Harv Schmidt, the 1957 Illini MVP and team captain, returned to his alma mater in 1967 after serving as an assistant at New Mexico for three years. Schmidt succeeded legendary coach Harry Combes after his dismissal related to a "slush-fund" scandal that devastated both the basketball and football programs for many years into the future. Schmidt, originally from Kankakee, was the slender 6 foot 6 inch star Illini forward who came highly recommended as both a coach and recruiter. Unfortunately, he had never been a head coach before, but he was considered the best the under the circumstances. Within three years of his arrival, he had brought Illinois back to among the elite programs in the Big Ten. The beginning of his tenure marked what possibly was the high-water mark in fan enthusiasm. Illinois led the nation in attendance in 1970, averaging 16,128 per home contest, with students routinely camped out for tickets outside the state-of-the-art Assembly Hall.

Even though Schmidt lacked coaching experience, he believed in the importance of an aggressive, overplaying defense with the intent of frustrating opponents, generating turnovers and creating easy baskets. He was a stickler to detail and used scouting techniques to learn ways of shutting down opponents offenses. Schmidt was always teaching, as well as coaching his teams, in order to compete favorably against any competition.

Due to the scandal that plagued the Illini, Schmidt's first team was primarily made up of walk-ons. Expectations of the 1967–68 team were low, however, they began to surprise even the experts when, in just their second game of the season, the Illini took on hall of fame player Elvin Hayes and the nationally ranked Houston Cougars at the Assembly Hall. During the matchup, Randy Crews, a 6-foot 5 inch high school All-American guard from Bradley-Bourbonnais Community High School, became a defensive stopper in just his second varsity game by taking on the 6 foot 9 inch Hayes. The Illini were forced to use a slow-down style to keep the game close and stayed with the Cougars the whole game, losing by a final score of 54–46.

During the remainder of the season, the Illini defeated such teams as Georgia Tech, Texas El Paso, Notre Dame, Michigan State, Iowa and Michigan. Unfortunately, the Ilini would lose 7 of their last 9 games of the Big Ten season to finish with a 6–8 conference record and an 11–13 mark overall, good for a second straight 7th-place finish in the Big Ten.

Positive signs for the Illini included a freshman team that included future varsity players Greg Jackson, Fred Miller, Rick Howat and Bob Windmiller. As sophomores, they would combine with returnees Dave Scholz, Randy Crews, future New York Knicks draft pick Mike Price, Alabama transfer Jodie Harrison, Dennis Pace and walk-on Les Busboom to form the best group Schmidt would ever coach. Scholz would finish this season by being named 1st team All-American by the Helms Foundation and to the Converse honorable mention All-American team.

The 1967–68 team's starting lineup included Crews and Benny Louis at the forward spots, Price and Harrison as guards and Scholz at center.

=== Roster ===
1967–68 Illinois Fighting Illini men's basketball team
Players
Coaches

Pos.	#	Name	Height	Weight	Year	Previous school	Hometown
G	11	Benny Louis (C)	6 ft 3 in (1.91 m)	180 lb (82 kg)	Sr	Pinckneyville Community High School	Pinckneyville, Illinois
F/C	12	Paul Nitz	6 ft 6 in (1.98 m)	195 lb (88 kg)	Jr	Marian Central Catholic High School	Woodstock, Illinois
G	15	Mike Price	6 ft 3 in (1.91 m)	195 lb (88 kg)	So	Arsenal Technical High School	Indianapolis, Indiana
G/F	24	Dan Kuemmerle	6 ft 3 in (1.91 m)	190 lb (86 kg)	Sr	Schlarman High School	Danville, Illinois
G	25	Steve Kohn	6 ft 4 in (1.93 m)	190 lb (86 kg)	So	Ladue High School	Creve Coeur, Missouri
F	30	Randy Crews	6 ft 5 in (1.96 m)	210 lb (95 kg)	So	Bradley-Bourbonnais Community High School	Kankakee, Illinois
G/F	32	Les Busboom	6 ft 4 in (1.93 m)	190 lb (86 kg)	Jr	St. Joseph-Ogden High School	Royal, Illinois
G	33	Jodie Harrison	6 ft 3 in (1.91 m)	200 lb (91 kg)	Jr	Streator High School	Streator, Illinois
G/F	34	Denny Pace	6 ft 3 in (1.91 m)	175 lb (79 kg)	Jr	Collinsville High School	Collinsville, Illinois
C	40	Dave Scholz	6 ft 8 in (2.03 m)	210 lb (95 kg)	Jr	Stephen Decatur High School	Decatur, Illinois
F	42	Jim Skarda	6 ft 5 in (1.96 m)	190 lb (86 kg)	So	Badger High School	Lake Geneva, Wisconsin
F	43	Rich Crusius	6 ft 6 in (1.98 m)	190 lb (86 kg)	Sr	Bloomington High School	Bloomington, Illinois
G	44	Ron Armbrust	6 ft 1 in (1.85 m)	180 lb (82 kg)	So	Lincoln High School	Lincoln, Illinois
G	45	Bill Jones	6 ft 1 in (1.85 m)	195 lb (88 kg)	So	Waller High School	Chicago, Illinois

Head coach

- Harv Schmidt (University of Illinois) (1st year)

Assistant coach(es)

- Dick Campbell (1st year)

Legend

- (C) Team captain
- (S) Suspended
- (I) Ineligible
- (W) Walk-on
- Injured
- Current redshirt

Roster

== Schedule ==
Date time, TV	Rank^{#}	Opponent^{#}	Result	Record	Site (attendance) city, state
Non-Conference regular season
12/2/1967*		at Butler	W 75-57	1-0	Hinkle Fieldhouse (5,875); Indianapolis
12/9/1967*		Houston	L 46-54	1-1	Assembly Hall (7,605); Champaign, Illinois
12/14/1967*		BYU	W 63-55	2-1	Assembly Hall (6,842); Champaign, Illinois
12/15/1967*		at Tennessee; Volunteer Classic	L 42-66	2-2	Stokely Athletic Center (8,500); Knoxville, Tennessee
12/16/1967*		vs. Army; Volunteer Classic	L 57-65	2-3	Stokely Athletic Center (9,650); Knoxville, Tennessee
12/22/1967*		at Stanford	L 72-74	2-4	Maples Pavilion (1,800); Stanford, California
12/23/1967*		at California	L 72-89	2-5	Haas Pavilion (3,400); Berkeley, California
12/28/1967*		vs. Georgia Tech	W 65-54	3-5	Chicago Stadium (5,212); Chicago
12/30/1967*		vs. UTEP	W 68-50	4-5	Chicago Stadium (5,108); Chicago
Big Ten regular season
1/6/1968		Michigan State	W 66-56	5-5 (1-0)	Assembly Hall (7,932); Champaign, Illinois
1/9/1968		Indiana; Rivalry	L 60-61 ^{ot}	5-6 (1-1)	Assembly Hall (6,396); Champaign, Il
1/13/1968		at Minnesota	W 61-60	6-6 (2-1)	Williams Arena (6,676); Minneapolis
1/27/1968*		vs. Notre Dame	W 68-67	7-6	Chicago Stadium (13,472); Chicago
2/3/1968		Iowa; Rivalry	W 66-63	8-6 (3-1)	Assembly Hall (8,553); Champaign, Illinois
2/6/1968		at Wisconsin	W 68-60	9-6 (4-1)	Wisconsin Field House (10,094); Madison, Wisconsin
2/10/1968		at Northwestern; Rivalry	L 71-78	9-7 (4-2)	McGaw Memorial Hall (8,349); Evanston, Illinois
2/13/1968		Michigan	L 65-67	9-8 (4-3)	Assembly Hall (8,850); Champaign, Illinois
2/17/1968		Purdue	L 68-75	9-9 (4-4)	Assembly Hall (11,941); Champaign, Illinois
2/20/1968		at Michigan	W 72-64	10-9 (5-4)	Crisler Arena (6,500); Ann Arbor, Michigan
2/24/1968		Northwestern; Rivalry	W 62-61	11-9 (6-4)	Assembly Hall (12,857); Champaign, Illinois
2/26/1968		at Ohio State	L 75-95	11-10 (6-5)	St. John Arena (12,591); Columbus, Ohio
3/2/1968		at Iowa; Rivalry	L 56-61	11-11 (6-6)	Iowa Field House (12,900); Iowa City, Iowa
3/4/1968		Ohio State	L 64-67	11-12 (6-7)	Assembly Hall (9,227); Champaign, Illinois
3/9/1968		at Michigan State	L 59-62	11-13 (6-8)	Jenison Fieldhouse (5,112); East Lansing, Michigan
*Non-conference game. ^{#}Rankings from AP Poll. (#) Tournament seedings in parentheses. All times are in Central Time.

== Player stats ==
Player	Games played	Field goals	Free throws	Rebounds	Points
Dave Scholz	24	223	83	230	529
Jodie Harrison	24	88	61	100	237
Randy Crews	23	88	60	155	236
Mike Price	24	71	62	123	204
Denny Pace	19	53	22	56	128
Benny Louis	24	37	19	50	93
Les Busboom	24	33	20	92	86
Paul Nitz	9	6	8	11	20
Ron Armbrust	6	1	1	0	3
Dan Kuemmerle	5	1	0	3	2
Jim Skarda	2	1	0	0	2
Rich Crusius	5	0	1	1	1
Bill Jones	4	0	0	1	0
Steven Kohn	1	0	0	0	0

== Awards and honors ==
- Dave Scholz
  - Team Most Valuable Player
  - 1st team All-American (Helms)
  - Honorable Mention All-American (Converse)

== Team players drafted into the NBA ==
Player	NBA club	Round	Pick
Ron Dunlap*	Chicago Bulls	2	5

*Dunlap was forced to skip his last two years of basketball due to the "Slush-Fund" scandal in 1966.
