= 1960–61 Michigan Wolverines men's basketball team =

American college basketball season

1960–61 Michigan Wolverines men's basketball
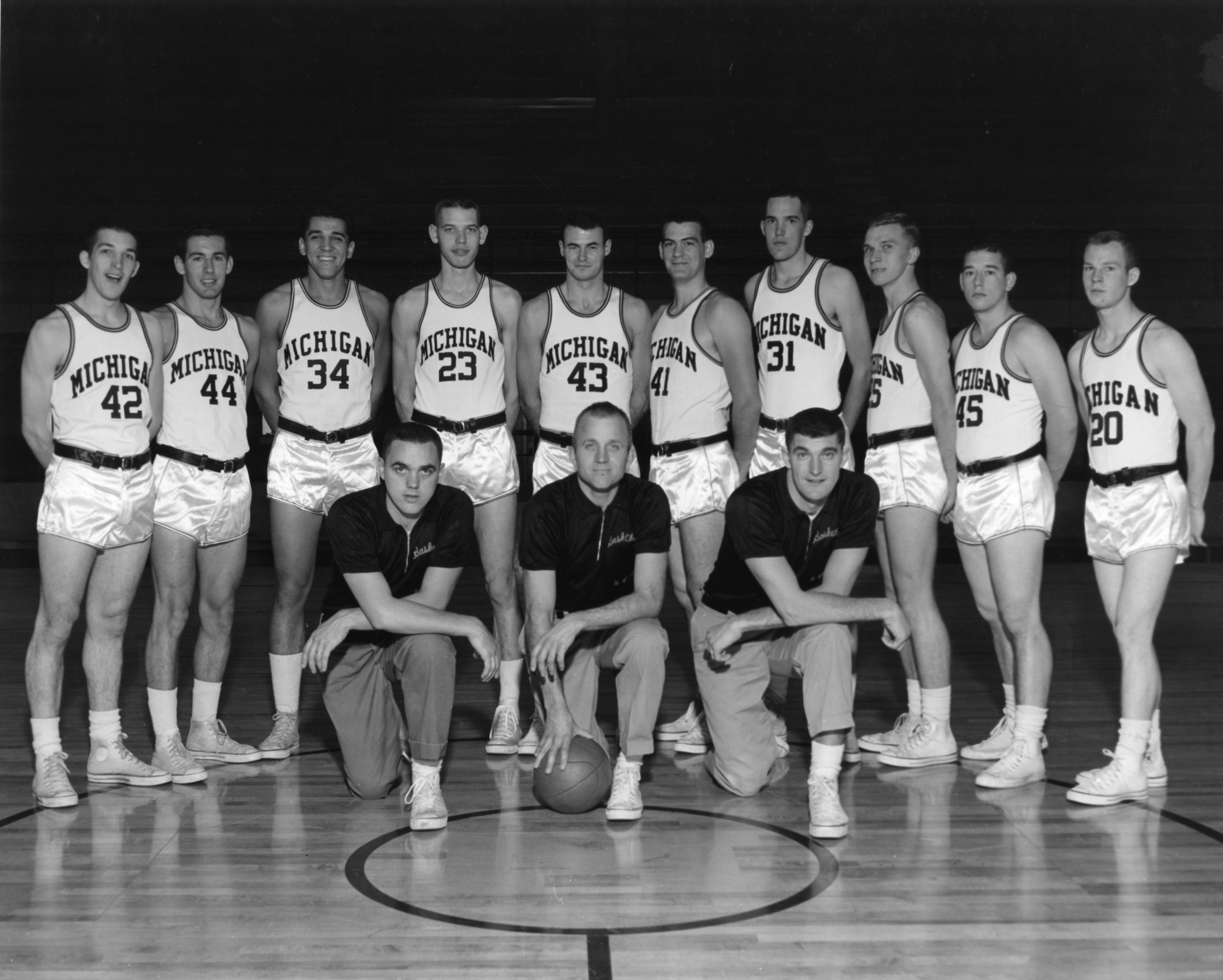
- Conference: Big Ten Conference
- Record: 6–18 (2–12 Big Ten)
- Head coach: Dave Strack
- Assistant coaches: James Skala; Tom Jorgensen
- MVP: John Tidwell
- Captain: John Tidwell
- Home arena: Fielding H. Yost Field House

1960–61 Big Ten Conference men's basketball standings
	Conf.				Overall
Team	W		L	PCT	W		L	PCT
No. 1 Ohio State	14	–	0	1.000	27	–	1	.964
No. 8 Iowa	10	–	4	.714	18	–	6	.750
Purdue	10	–	4	.714	16	–	7	.696
Indiana	8	–	6	.571	15	–	9	.625
Minnesota	8	–	6	.571	10	–	13	.435
Northwestern	6	–	8	.429	10	–	12	.455
Illinois	5	–	9	.357	9	–	15	.375
Wisconsin	4	–	10	.286	7	–	17	.292
Michigan State	3	–	11	.214	7	–	17	.292
Michigan	2	–	12	.143	6	–	18	.250
Rankings from https://www.sports-reference.com/cbb/conferences/big-ten/1961.html

The 1960–61 Michigan Wolverines men's basketball team represented the University of Michigan in intercollegiate college basketball during the 1960–61 season. The team played its home games at Fielding H. Yost Field House (renamed Yost Ice Arena in 1973) on the school's campus in Ann Arbor, Michigan.

== Season overview ==
Under the direction of first-year head coach Dave Strack, the team compiled 6–18 record (2–12 in conference games), finished tenth in the Big Ten Conference and failed to get an invitation to either the 1961 NCAA Men's Division I Basketball Tournament or the 1961 National Invitation Tournament. Over the course of the season, the team lost to both ranked opponents that it faced. Although it had a 6–6 record at home, it lost all 12 of its road games.

After two road losses to Vanderbilt and Tennessee to open the season, Michigan returned to Yost Field House and won its home opener over Pittsburgh, 86–70, on December 6, 1960. Team captain and senior, John Tidwell led Michigan's scoring with 38 points.

On February 2, 1961, Michigan tallied its highest point total of the year and easily defeated Western Ontario, 88–58, in a non-conference home game. All 13 Michigan players saw action against Western Ontario, a team that was "rated as Canada's best." Tidwell led the team in scoring with 28 points, and Tom Cole led the way on the boards with 13 rebounds. The team set a Michigan single-game record with 72 rebounds against Western Ontario, but the record would be broken exactly two years later when the current record of 77 was set.

Two days after its victory over the Canadians, Michigan suffered its worst loss of the season, losing at home to an undefeated and No. 1 ranked Ohio State team by a score of 80–58. The game was played in front of a crowd of 6,000 fans and a regional television audience. The Associated Press wrote, "The fabulous Buckeys, now 16–0 for the season and 6–0 in the Big Ten, dispatched the conference cellar dwellers with an adding machine offense."

Michigan's second worst loss of the season came on the road against Purdue, 96–79, on February 6, 1961. Four Michigan players fouled out of the game, as the Wolverines were called for 58 personal fouls. Purdue converted 40 of 48 free throw attempts. Michigan's leading scorer, Tidwell, was among the four Wolverines to foul out, and he finished the game with only one point.

On February 13, 1961, Michigan won its first Big Ten Conference game, defeating Michigan State 78–67 in front of a season-high crowd of 6,500 at Yost Field House. In the battle of in-state rivals, the Wolverines' center, Scott Maentz of East Grand Rapids, was the only Michigan-born player to start for either team. Michigan's Tom Cole was the high scorer with 29 points. Maentz, who also played end for the Michigan football team, scored 19 points and pulled in 18 rebounds.

On March 4, 1961, Tidwell established a Big Ten Conference single-game record by making 20 field goals in a 73–70 loss against Minnesota. Tidwell also broke his own Michigan single-game scoring record with 43 points in the loss to Minnesota. Tidwell's Big Ten record of 20 field goals stood until February 16, 1963, when Jimmy Rayl posted 23 for Indiana.

On March 6, 1961, in the final home game of the season, Michigan won only its second conference game, defeating Illinois, 74–66. Scott Maentz led a second-half rally that put the Wolverines on top. After a slow start with two points in the first half, Maentz scored 16 points in the second half before fouling out with six minutes left in the game. Tidwell, playing in his final home game in front of a crowd of 3,000, led Michigan's scorers with 24 points. Tidwell set nearly every Michigan scoring record, and when he was pulled from the game, he was "given a three-minute, standing ovation for his effort."

On March 11, 1961, Michigan closed its season with an 82–67 loss to Indiana in Bloomington. The season-ending loss to Indiana is notable in that the two teams set a National Collegiate Athletic Association single-game record, that still stands as of 2010, with 152 total rebounds, 95 by Indiana and 57 for Michigan. Indiana's Walt Bellamy led the effort with 33 rebounds to break his own Indiana record.

At the conclusion of the season, the members of the team chose Tidwell as the team's Most Valuable Player. Tidwell scored 441 points for a 19.2 point average during his senior year. Tidwell became the first Wolverine to end his career with a 20-point per game scoring average, and his career point total (1,386) eclipsed the school scoring record set by Ron Kramer in 1957 (1,119). Bill Buntin broke Tidwell's scoring record in 1965 with 1,725 points and a 21.8 point per game average.

== Schedule ==
Opponent	Date	Location	W/L	Attendance
Vanderbilt	December 2, 1960	Knoxville, Tennessee	L-43-58	4,500
Tennessee	December 3, 1960	Knoxville, Tennessee	L-64-75	-
Pittsburgh	December 6, 1960	Yost Field House	W-86-70	2,000
Butler	December 8, 1960	Yost Field House	L-58-68	2,000
Drake	December 10, 1960	Des Moines, Iowa	L-72-83	-
Idaho	December 14, 1960	Yost Field House	W-68-57	1,500
Wichita State	December 19, 1960	Wichita, Kansas	L-76-94	3,320
Denver	December 21, 1960	University of Denver Fieldhouse	L-59-68	547
Brown	December 28, 1960	Yost Field House	W-74-56	1,800
Indiana	January 7, 1961	Yost Field House	L-70-81	3,800
Illinois	January 14, 1961	George Huff Gymnasium, Champaign, Illinois	L-64-88	6,705
Michigan State	January 16, 1961	East Lansing, Michigan	L-69-81	8,015
Western Ontario	February 2, 1961	Yost Field House	W-88-58	800
Ohio State	February 4, 1961	Yost Field House	L-58-80	6,000
Purdue	February 6, 1961	Lafayette, Indiana	L-79-96	8,500
Minnesota	February 11, 1961	Williams Arena, Minneapolis, Minnesota	L-53-70	7,863
Michigan State	February 13, 1961	Yost Field House	W-78-67	5,500
Purdue	February 18, 1961	Yost Field House	L-64-65	4,500
Iowa	February 20, 1961	Yost Field House	L-46-50	4,000
Northwestern	February 25, 1961	Evanston, Illinois	L-56-66	3,500
Wisconsin	February 27, 1961	UW Field House	L-68-76	4,476
Minnesota	March 4, 1961	Yost Field House	L-70-73	3,000
Illinois	March 6, 1961	Yost Field House	W-74-66	3,000
Indiana	March 11, 1961	Gladstein Fieldhouse, Bloomington, Indiana	L-67-82	3,862

== Player statistics ==
The following player statistics are taken from the University of Michigan's Men's Basketball Statistic Archive Query Page.

Name	GP	GS	FG	FT	FTA	FT%	Points	Avg
John Tidwell	23	20	182	77	158	0.487	441	19.2
Tom Cole	23	20	107	77	133	0.579	291	12.7
Scott Maentz	23	15	82	21	40	0.525	185	8.0
Don Petroff	15	9	65	28	42	0.667	158	10.5
Jon Hall	22	17	54	43	73	0.589	151	6.9
Steve Schoenherr	20	8	44	12	18	0.667	100	5.0
Charles Higgs	21	11	33	26	45	0.578	92	4.4
Robert Brown	23	13	28	21	60	0.350	77	3.4
Richard Donley	15	3	16	23	35	0.657	55	3.7
Tom Eveland	13	1	9	8	15	0.533	26	2.0
Syl Jankowski	2	1	0	2	2	1.000	2	1.0
George Ginger	2	0	1	0	0	.000	2	1.0

== Team players drafted into the NBA ==
One player from this team were selected in the NBA draft.

Year	Round	Pick	Overall	Player	NBA Club
1961	4	6	38	John Tidwell	Philadelphia Warriors
