= Sam Williams (basketball, born 1945) =

American basketball player

Personal information
- Born: January 22, 1946 (age 80) Detroit, Michigan, U.S.
- Listed height: 6 ft 3 in (1.91 m)
- Listed weight: 180 lb (82 kg)

Career information
- High school: Northern (Detroit, Michigan)
- College: Southeastern CC (1964–1966); Iowa (1966–1968)
- NBA draft: 1968: 3rd round, 35th overall pick
- Drafted by: Milwaukee Bucks
- Playing career: 1968–1970
- Position: Shooting guard
- Number: 3

Career history
- 1968–1970: Milwaukee Bucks

Career highlights
- Third-team All-American – AP (1968); 2× First-team All-Big Ten (1967, 1968)

Career NBA statistics
- Points: 255 (3.9 ppg)
- Rebounds: 116 (1.8 rpg)
- Assists: 64 (1.0 apg)
- Stats at NBA.com
- Stats at Basketball Reference

Samuel H. Williams (born January 22, 1945) is an American former professional basketball player who played for the National Basketball Association’s Milwaukee Bucks from 1968 until 1970.

== Career ==
Williams attended Northern High School in Detroit, Michigan and was awarded an athletic scholarship to attend the University of Iowa in 1964. Iowa enjoyed six years of tremendous success under coach Ralph Miller from 1964–65 through 1969–1970, winning two Big Ten conference titles during that span. The 1967–68 team tied for the Big Ten Title with Ohio State with a 10–4 conference record, and a 16–9 overall record. This team was led by Williams, a 6-foot, 3 inch, 180 lbs guard, who led the Big Ten in scoring that year. Williams had a career high 39 points in a game against Northwestern University in 1967.

Williams scored a season average 25.3 points a game his senior year. Williams was voted the Big Ten MVP in 1968, as well as Iowa's team MVP. He was named a third-team All-American that year. Williams was drafted by the Milwaukee Bucks in the 3rd round (13th pick, 35th overall) of the 1968 NBA draft and was a pre-draft selection of the Minnesota Pipers of the ABA. He played two seasons for the Bucks, averaging 3.9 points a game and was cut by the team at the end of the 1969–70 season. Williams earned $25,000 in his first season and $30,000 in his second year.

== Career statistics ==
Legend
| GP | Games played | GS | Games started | MPG | Minutes per game |
| FG% | Field goal percentage | 3P% | 3-point field goal percentage | FT% | Free throw percentage |
| RPG | Rebounds per game | APG | Assists per game | SPG | Steals per game |
| BPG | Blocks per game | PPG | Points per game | **Bold** | Career high |

=== NBA ===
==== Regular season ====
| Year | Team | GP | MPG | FG% | FT% | RPG | APG | PPG |
|---|---|---|---|---|---|---|---|---|
| 1968–69 | Milwaukee | **55** | **11.4** | .342 | **.537** | **2.0** | **1.1** | **4.1** |
| 1969–70 | Milwaukee | 11 | 4.0 | **.458** | .455 | .6 | .3 | 2.5 |
| Career | | 66 | 10.2 | .353 | .531 | 1.8 | 1.0 | 3.9 |

==== Playoffs ====
| Year | Team | GP | MPG | FG% | FT% | RPG | APG | PPG |
|---|---|---|---|---|---|---|---|---|
| 1970 | Milwaukee | 2 | 8.0 | .571 | .000 | 2.0 | .5 | 4.0 |
