= 1967–68 Michigan Wolverines men's basketball team =

American college basketball season

1967–68 Michigan Wolverines men's basketball
- Conference: Big Ten Conference
- Record: 11–13 (6–8 Big Ten)
- Head coach: Dave Strack
- Captain: Jim Pitts
- Home arena: Crisler Arena

1967–68 Big Ten Conference men's basketball standings
	Conf.				Overall
Team	W		L	PCT	W		L	PCT
Ohio State	10	–	4	.714	21	–	8	.724
Iowa	10	–	4	.714	16	–	9	.640
Purdue	9	–	5	.643	15	–	9	.625
Northwestern	8	–	6	.571	13	–	10	.565
Wisconsin	7	–	7	.500	13	–	11	.542
Michigan State	6	–	8	.429	12	–	12	.500
Illinois	6	–	8	.429	11	–	13	.458
Michigan	6	–	8	.429	11	–	13	.458
Indiana	4	–	10	.286	10	–	14	.417
Minnesota	4	–	10	.286	7	–	17	.292
Rankings from AP Poll

The 1967–68 Michigan Wolverines men's basketball team represented the University of Michigan in intercollegiate basketball during the 1967–68 season. The team finished the season tied for seventh place in the Big Ten Conference with an overall record of 11–13 and 6–8 against conference opponents.

Dave Strack was in his eighth and final year as the team's coach. Sophomore Rudy Tomjanovich was the team's leading scorer and rebounder with 471 points and 323 rebounds in 24 games for an average of 19.6 points and 13.5 rebounds per game.

== Scoring statistics ==
Player	Pos.	Yr	G	FG	FT	RB	Pts	PPG
Rudy Tomjanovich	F	Soph	24	211-446	49-78	323	471	19.6
Dennis Stewart	F	Jr.	24	171-420	83-115	223	425	17.7
Jim Pitts	G	Sr.	24	142-340	134-221	177	418	17.4
Bob Sullivan	G	Jr.	23	112-233	71-102	126	295	12.8
Ken Maxey			24	74-190	37-52	75	185	7.7
Dave McClellan	C	Jr.	20	24-63	19-23	54	67	3.4
Totals			24	794-1836	429-654	1240	2017	84.0

== Team players drafted into the NBA ==
Three players from this team were selected in the NBA draft.

Year	Round	Pick	Overall	Player	NBA Club
1969	4	1	44	Dennis Stewart	Phoenix Suns
1970	1	2	2	Rudy Tomjanovich	San Diego Rockets
