= Canton High School (Illinois) =

Public school in Illinois, United States

Location
- 1001 N. Main Street; Canton, Illinois 61520; United States; 40°34′08″N 90°02′03″W

Information
- Type: Public
- Established: 1860
- School district: Canton Union School District 66
- Principal: Jay Valencia
- Teaching staff: 44.50 (on FTE basis)
- Grades: 9 to 12
- Enrollment: 609 (2023-2024)
- Student to teacher ratio: 13.69
- Colors: Purple and Gold
- Athletics conference: Mid-Illini
- Mascot: Little Giants/Lady Giants
- Nickname: CHS
- Team name: Little Giants/Lady Giants
- Rival: Morton High School "Potters".
- Website: CHS home page

Canton High School is a public high school located in Canton, Illinois. The school serves about 700 students in grades 9 to 12 in the Canton Union School District.

The school's team name was once the Plowboys but was changed in 1932 to the Little Giants after a plow made by the International Harvester company in downtown Canton.

== Notable alumni ==
- Steven R. Nagel (1946–2014), astronaut
- Dave Downey (1941–2025), basketball player
