= 1960–61 Indiana Hoosiers men's basketball team =

American college basketball season

1960–61 Indiana Hoosiers men's basketball
- Conference: Big Ten Conference
- Record: 15–9 (8–6 Big Ten)
- Head coach: Branch McCracken (20th season)
- Assistant coach: Lou Watson
- Captain: Gary Long
- Home arena: New Fieldhouse

1960–61 Big Ten Conference men's basketball standings
	Conf.				Overall
Team	W		L	PCT	W		L	PCT
No. 1 Ohio State	14	–	0	1.000	27	–	1	.964
No. 8 Iowa	10	–	4	.714	18	–	6	.750
Purdue	10	–	4	.714	16	–	7	.696
Indiana	8	–	6	.571	15	–	9	.625
Minnesota	8	–	6	.571	10	–	13	.435
Northwestern	6	–	8	.429	10	–	12	.455
Illinois	5	–	9	.357	9	–	15	.375
Wisconsin	4	–	10	.286	7	–	17	.292
Michigan State	3	–	11	.214	7	–	17	.292
Michigan	2	–	12	.143	6	–	18	.250
Rankings from https://www.sports-reference.com/cbb/conferences/big-ten/1961.html

The 1960–61 Indiana Hoosiers men's basketball team represented Indiana University. Their head coach was Branch McCracken, who was in his 20th year. For the first time, the team played its home games in the New Fieldhouse in Bloomington, Indiana, and was a member of the Big Ten Conference.

The Hoosiers finished the regular season with an overall record of 15–9 and a conference record of 8–6, finishing 4th in the Big Ten Conference. Indiana was not invited to participate in any postseason tournament.

== Roster ==
No.	Name	Position	Ht.	Year	Hometown
13	Dan Prickett	G	5–11	So.	Wolf Lake, Indiana
15	Gary Long	G	6–1	Sr.	Shelbyville, Indiana
20	Dave Granger	F	6–7	So.	Hillsdale, Michigan
22	Jimmy Rayl	G	6–2	So.	Kokomo, Indiana
23	Jerry Bass	G	5–9	Jr.	Morristown, Indiana
24	Ray Pavy	G	6–1	So.	New Castle, Indiana
25	Charley Roush	F	6–1	So.	Columbus, Indiana
30	Gordon Mickey	F	6–7	Jr.	Chillicothe, Ohio
31	Dick Sparks	C	6–5	So.	Bloomington, Indiana
32	Ernie Wilhoit	G	6–3	Jr.	Collinsville, Illinois
33	Winston Fairfield	C	6–9	So.	Wilmington, Massachusetts
35	Walt Bellamy	C	6–11	Sr.	New Bern, North Carolina
41	Frank Daly	F	6–2	F	Springfield, MA
42	Charley Hall	F	6–6	Jr.	Terre Haute, Indiana
43	Dave Porter	F	6–4	So.	Noblesville, Indiana
45	Tom Bolyard	F	6–4	So.	Fort Wayne, Indiana

== Schedule/results ==
Date time, TV	Rank^{#}	Opponent^{#}	Result	Record	Site city, state
Regular season
12/3/1960*		Indiana State	W 80–53	1–0	New Fieldhouse; Bloomington, IN
12/5/1960*		at Kansas State	W 98–80	2–0	Ahearn Field House; Manhattan, KS
12/10/1960*		at Detroit	L 79–81 ^{OT}	2–1	Calihan Hall; Detroit, MI
12/12/1960*		Missouri	W 66–55	3–1	New Fieldhouse; Bloomington, IN
12/17/1960*	No. 4	Nevada	W 80–52	4–1	New Fieldhouse; Bloomington, IN
12/20/1960*	No. 4	vs. Notre Dame	W 74–69	5–1	Memorial Coliseum; Fort Wayne, IN
12/28/1960*	No. 4	vs. Stanford; Los Angeles Basketball Classic	W 58–50	6–1	Los Angeles Memorial Sports Arena; Los Angeles, CA
12/29/1960*	No. 4	at UCLA; Los Angeles Basketball Classic	L 72–94	6–2	Los Angeles Memorial Sports Arena; Los Angeles, CA
12/30/1960*	No. 4	at USC; Los Angeles Basketball Classic	L 71–90	6–3	Los Angeles Memorial Sports Arena; Los Angeles, CA
1/7/1961		at Michigan	W 81–70	7–3 (1–0)	Yost Field House; Ann Arbor, MI
1/9/1961		Michigan State	W 79–55	8–3 (2–0)	New Fieldhouse; Bloomington, IN
1/28/1961*		DePaul	W 81–78	9–3 (2–0)	New Fieldhouse; Bloomington, IN
1/30/1961		at Minnesota	L 58–66	9–4 (2–1)	Williams Arena; Minneapolis, MN
2/4/1961		Northwestern	W 90–78	10–4 (3–1)	New Fieldhouse; Bloomington, IN
2/6/1961		at Ohio State	L 65–100	10–5 (3–2)	St. John Arena; Columbus, OH
2/11/1961		Iowa	L 67–74	10–6 (3–3)	New Fieldhouse; Bloomington, IN
2/13/1961		at Purdue; Rivalry	L 55–64	10–7 (3–4)	Lambert Fieldhouse; West Lafayette, IN
2/18/1961		at Wisconsin	W 98–84	11–7 (4–4)	Wisconsin Field House; Madison, WI
2/20/1961		Ohio State	L 69–73	11–8 (4–5)	New Fieldhouse; Bloomington, IN
2/25/1961		Illinois; Rivalry	W 93–82	12–8 (5–5)	New Fieldhouse; Bloomington, IN
2/27/1961		at Northwestern	L 58–60 ^{OT}	12–9 (5–6)	Welsh-Ryan Arena; Evanston, IL
3/4/1961		at Iowa	W 78–69	13–9 (6–6)	Iowa Field House; Iowa City, IA
3/6/1961		Wisconsin	W 80–69	14–9 (7–6)	New Fieldhouse; Bloomington, IN
3/11/1961		Michigan	W 82–67	15–9 (8–6)	New Fieldhouse; Bloomington, IN
*Non-conference game. ^{#}Rankings from AP Poll. (#) Tournament seedings in parentheses.
