= 1960–61 Ohio State Buckeyes men's basketball team =

American college basketball season

1960–61 Ohio State Buckeyes men's basketball
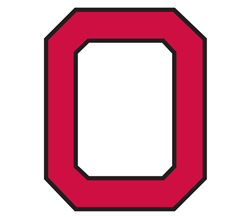

Big Ten Champions NCAA regular season champions NCAA Tournament, runner-up

National Championship Game, L 65-70 ^{OT} vs. Cincinnati
- Conference: Big Ten

Ranking
- Coaches: No. 1
- AP: No. 1
- Record: 27–1 (14–0 Big Ten)
- Head coach: Fred Taylor
- Home arena: St. John Arena

1960–61 Big Ten Conference men's basketball standings
	Conf.				Overall
Team	W		L	PCT	W		L	PCT
No. 1 Ohio State	14	–	0	1.000	27	–	1	.964
No. 8 Iowa	10	–	4	.714	18	–	6	.750
Purdue	10	–	4	.714	16	–	7	.696
Indiana	8	–	6	.571	15	–	9	.625
Minnesota	8	–	6	.571	10	–	13	.435
Northwestern	6	–	8	.429	10	–	12	.455
Illinois	5	–	9	.357	9	–	15	.375
Wisconsin	4	–	10	.286	7	–	17	.292
Michigan State	3	–	11	.214	7	–	17	.292
Michigan	2	–	12	.143	6	–	18	.250
Rankings from https://www.sports-reference.com/cbb/conferences/big-ten/1961.html

The 1960–61 Ohio State Buckeyes men's basketball team represented Ohio State University. The team's head coach was Fred Taylor. The team finished with an overall record of 27–1 and were undefeated in Big Ten conference play. In the 1961 NCAA Tournament Ohio State made it all the way to the championship game but lost to Cincinnati 70–65 in overtime.

== Roster ==
1960–61 Ohio State Buckeyes men's basketball team
Players
Coaches

Pos.	#	Name	Height	Weight	Year	Previous school	Hometown
G	3	Mel Nowell	6 ft 2 in (1.88 m)	165 lb (75 kg)	Jr	East	Columbus, Ohio
G	5	John Havlicek	6 ft 5 in (1.96 m)	195 lb (88 kg)	Jr	Bridgeport	Bridgeport, Ohio
F/C	11	Jerry Lucas	6 ft 8 in (2.03 m)	220 lb (100 kg)	Jr	Middletown	Middletown, Ohio
G	21	Larry Siegfried	6 ft 3 in (1.91 m)	185 lb (84 kg)	Sr	Shelby	Shelby, Ohio
F	24	Bob Knight	6 ft 5 in (1.96 m)	—	Jr	Orrville	Orrville, Ohio

Head coach

- Fred Taylor

Assistant coach(es)

Legend

- (C) Team captain
- (S) Suspended
- (I) Ineligible
- (W) Walk-on
- Injured
- Current redshirt

== NCAA basketball tournament ==
- Mideast
  - Ohio State 56, Louisville 55
  - Ohio State 87, Kentucky 74
- Final Four
  - Ohio State 95, St. Joseph’s, Pennsylvania 69
  - Cincinnati 70, Ohio State 65 OT

== Rankings ==
Ranking movements
	Week													
Poll	1	2	3	4	5	6	7	8	9	10	11	12	13	Final
AP	Not released	1	1	1	1	1	1	1	1	1	1	1	1	1
Coaches	1	1	1	1	1	1	1	1	1	1	1	1	1	1

== Awards and honors ==
- John Havlicek, First-Team All Big Ten
- Jerry Lucas, All-America selection
- Jerry Lucas, NCAA Men's MOP Award
- Jerry Lucas, Chicago Tribune Silver Basketball
- Jerry Lucas, First-Team All Big Ten
- Jerry Lucas, USBWA College Player of the Year
- Larry Siegfried, First-Team All Big Ten

== Team players drafted into the NBA ==
Round	Pick	Player	NBA club
1	3	Larry Siegfried	Cincinnati Royals
