= Gladstein Fieldhouse =

Sports complex in Bloomington, Indiana

Coordinates: 39°10′51″N 86°31′13″W

Harry Gladstein Fieldhouse
- Interactive map of Harry Gladstein Fieldhouse
- Former names: New Fieldhouse
- Location: 1101 E 17th Street; Bloomington, Indiana 47408
- Owner: Indiana University
- Operator: Indiana University
- Capacity: 9,000 (approx., former)
- Surface: Mondo-surface banked track, Mondo Super-X infield

Construction
- Groundbreaking: 1958
- Opened: 1960
- Cost: $1,694,725

Tenants
- Indiana Hoosiers (track & field - current) (basketball - 1960–1971)

The Harry Gladstein Fieldhouse, also known as the New Fieldhouse, is an indoor track and field complex on the campus of Indiana University in Bloomington, Indiana. From 1960 to 1971 it also served as the home of the Indiana Hoosiers men's basketball team.

== History ==
The Fieldhouse was originally planned to be a new modern basketball arena to replace the Old IU Fieldhouse. However, the allocated money for the project was used to build a new football stadium. As a result, the plans were revised to be for a temporary, interim basketball facility.

The Fieldhouse cost $1.7 million to build. The basketball team spent eleven years there before moving to Assembly Hall in 1971. The last game was played on March 13, 1971, where the Hoosiers lost 103–87 to Illinois.

In the summer of 1972, a Tartan track surface was installed for $280,000. In 1997, the fieldhouse was renamed for Harry Gladstein, a 1931 graduate and former student manager for the track team. His family's $1 million donation allowed for a Mondo Super-X surface to be installed in the fieldhouse. In 2006, a Mondo-surface banked track was installed in the fieldhouse. This track had previously been installed in the RCA Dome and used for the inaugural 1987 IAAF Indoor World Championships and the NCAA Division I and II indoor track championships held annually through 1999.

== Track and field facility records ==
The track and field records for the facility are as follows:

Event	Mark	Athlete	Team	Date
Men's 60 meter hurdles	7.51	Terrence Trammel	Doyle Mgmt	2/17/2006
Women's 60 meter hurdles	8.02	Perdita Felicien	University of Illinois	3/02/2003
Men's 60 meter dash	6.58	Terrence Trammel	Doyle Mgmt	2/17/2007
		Ryan Shields	O.F.F. Track Club	1/30/2010
Women's 60 meter dash	7.17	Javianne Oliver	Unattached	12/8/2017
Men's 200 meter dash	20.86	Christian Coleman	University of Tennessee	1/7/2017
Women's 200 meter dash	23.20	Felicia Brown	University of Tennessee	1/9/2016
Men's 400 meter dash	46.39	Antonio McKay	Georgia Tech	1985
Women's 400 meter dash	52.23	Mary Wineberg	Nike-Indiana	1/25/2008
Men's 600 meters	1:15.88	Daniel Kuhn	Indiana University	1/28/2017
Women's 600 meters	1:27.78	Heather Dorniden	University of Minnesota	3/1/2009
Men's 800 meters	1:47.03	Daniel Kuhn	Indiana University	1/21/2017
Women's 800 meters	2:02.88	Kelsey Harris	Unattached	2/6/2021
Men's 1000 meters	2:21.03	Kris Gauson	Butler University	12/9/2011
Men's Mile	3:56.17	Jim Spivey	Athletics West	1984
Women's Mile	4:31.37	Andre Everett	Purdue University	1986
Men's 3000 meters	7:48.35	Andrew Bayer	Indiana University	1/21/2011
Women's 3000 meters	9:08.42	Stephanie Herbst	University of Wisconsin	1986
Men's 5000 meters	13:38.87	Marc Scott	University of Tulsa	12/9/2016
Women's 5000 meters	15:34.53	Alicia Monson	University of Wisconsin	1/26/2019
Men's High Jump	2.31 meters	Mark Reed	University of Houston	1988
Women's High Jump	1.87 meters	Connie Teaberry	Goldwin Track Club	2/6/1993
Men's Long Jump	8.26 meters	Charlton Ehizuelen	University of Illinois	3/7/1975
Women's Long Jump	6.48 meters	Rose Richmond	Indiana University	2003
		Hyless Fountain	Nike	2/11/2011
Men's Triple Jump	16.89 meters	Jan Cado	North Central	1989
Women's Triple Jump	13.0 meters	Tania Longe	Unknown	2/28/1997
Men's Pole Vault	5.66 meters	Mark Buse	Indiana University	2/12/1994
Women's Pole Vault	4.21 meters	Natalya Bartnovskaya	Vincennes University	1/29/2011
		Mackenzie Fields	University of Cincinnati	2/11/2011
Men's Shot Put	21.38 meters	Mike Lehman	University of Illinois	1982
Women's Shot Put	18.00 meters	Faith Sherrill	Indiana University	1/8/2011
Men's Weight Throw	23.36 meters	Cory Martin	Nike	1/23/2010
Women's Weight Throw	24.57	Brittany Riley	Southern Illinois University	1/26/2007
Men's 4x400 meter relay	3:11.07	Unknown	University of Minnesota	2/27/2007
Women's 4x400 meter relay	3:38.89	Unknown	University of Illinois	2/3/2007
Men's 4x800 meter relay	7:30.50	Unknown	Murray State University	1978
Women's 4x800 meter relay	8:49.71	Unknown	Indiana University	1988
Men's Distance Medley Relay	9:30.78	Stockberger, Vaughn, Holahan, Bayer	Indiana University	2/11/2011
Women's Distance Medley Relay	11:29.93	McCarthy, Vallar, Caldwell, Kinney	Grand Valley State University	1/29/2011
Heptathlon	5861 points	Jake Arnold	Asics	3/7/2010
Pentathlon	4544 points	Diane Pickler	Asics	3/6/2010
