= 1954–55 NCAA men's basketball season =

Men's university basketball season

- Preseason AP No. 1: None
- NCAA Tournament: 1955
- Tournament dates: March 8 – 19, 1955
- National Championship: Municipal Auditorium; Kansas City, Missouri
- NCAA Champions: San Francisco Dons
- Helms National Champions: San Francisco Dons
- Other champions: Duquesne Dukes (NIT)
- Player of the Year (Helms): Bill Russell, San Francisco Dons

The 1954–55 NCAA men's basketball season began in December 1954, progressed through the regular season and conference tournaments, and concluded with the 1955 NCAA basketball tournament championship game on March 19, 1955, at Municipal Auditorium in Kansas City, Missouri. The San Francisco Dons won their first NCAA national championship with a 77–63 victory over the La Salle Explorers.

== Rule changes ==
- The "one-and-one" free throw was introduced, allowing a player to attempt a second free throw after a foul if he made the first free throw. Previously, a player shot only one free throw after a foul.
- Games once again are divided into two 20-minute halves, as had been the practice through the 1950–51 season. From the 1951–52 season though the 1953–54 season, games had been divided into four 10-minute quarters.

== Season headlines ==
- Tom Gola of La Salle completed his collegiate career (1952–1955) with a total of 2,462 points and 2,201 rebounds, making him the first player to achieve 2,000 or more points and 2,000 or more rebounds in his career.
- Gola was named the 1955 player of the year by United Press (later United Press International), the first player to be recognized as the national player of the year.
- Head coach Phil Woolpert of San Francisco was named coach of the year by United Press (the future United Press International), becoming the first person to be recognized as national coach of the year.
- The Eastern Intercollegiate Basketball League disbanded at the end of the season. Its teams, history, and heritage were absorbed into the Ivy League the following season.

== Season outlook ==
=== Pre-season polls ===
The Top 20 from the AP Poll and the UP Coaches Poll during the pre-season.

Associated Press
Ranking	Team
1	La Salle
2	Kentucky
3	Duquesne
4	Iowa
5	Holy Cross
6	Indiana
7	Dayton
8	Niagara
9	Notre Dame
10	NC State
11	Oklahoma A&M
12	Saint Louis
13	UCLA
14	Illinois
15	Wichita
16	Utah
17 (tie)	Duke
17 (tie)	Wake Forest
19	Penn State
20	Western Kentucky State

UP Coaches
Ranking	Team
1	La Salle
2	Iowa
3	Duquesne
4	Kentucky
5	Indiana
6	Illinois
7	NC State
8	Holy Cross
9	UCLA
10	Niagara
11	Notre Dame
12	Dayton
13 (tie)	Saint Louis
13 (tie)	Utah
15	USC
16	DePaul
17 (tie)	Oklahoma A&M
17 (tie)	Oregon State
19	Cincinnati
20	Wichita

== Arenas ==
- Kansas began playing at Allen Fieldhouse late in the season, on March 1, 1955. The arena was named for Kansas's coach at the time, Phog Allen. Allen Fieldhouse would eventually give Kansas one of the top college basketball home-court advantages in the United States.

== Regular season ==
=== Conference ===
==== Conference winners and tournaments ====
Conference	Regular season winner	Conference player of the year	Conference tournament	Tournament venue (City)	Tournament winner
Atlantic Coast Conference	NC State	Dickie Hemric, Wake Forest	1955 ACC men's basketball tournament	Reynolds Coliseum (Raleigh, North Carolina)	NC State
Big Seven Conference	Colorado	None selected	No Tournament		
Big Ten Conference	Iowa	None selected	No Tournament		
Border Conference	Texas Tech & West Texas A&M		No Tournament		
California Basketball Association	San Francisco	Ken Sears, Santa Clara	No Tournament		
Eastern Intercollegiate Basketball League	Princeton	None selected	No Tournament		
Metropolitan New York Conference	Manhattan		No Tournament		
Mid-American Conference	Miami (OH)	None selected	No Tournament		
Missouri Valley Conference	Saint Louis & Tulsa	None selected	No Tournament		
Mountain States (Skyline) Conference	Utah		No Tournament		
Ohio Valley Conference	Western Kentucky State	None selected	1955 Ohio Valley Conference men's basketball tournament	Jefferson County Armory (Louisville, Kentucky)	Eastern Kentucky State
Pacific Coast Conference	Oregon State (North); UCLA (South)		No Tournament; Oregon State defeated UCLA in best-of-three conference playoff series		
Southeastern Conference	Kentucky	None selected	No Tournament		
Southern Conference	West Virginia	Darrell Floyd, Furman	1955 Southern Conference men's basketball tournament	Richmond Arena (Richmond, Virginia)	West Virginia
Southwest Conference	SMU	None selected	No Tournament		
Western New York Little Three Conference	Niagara		No Tournament		
Yankee Conference	Connecticut	None selected	No Tournament		

==== Conference standings ====
1954–55 ACC men's basketball standings
	Conf.				Overall
Team	W		L	PCT	W		L	PCT
No. 4 NC State †	12	–	2	.857	28	–	4	.875
Duke	11	–	3	.786	20	–	8	.714
Maryland	10	–	4	.714	17	–	7	.708
Wake Forest	8	–	6	.571	17	–	10	.630
North Carolina	8	–	6	.571	10	–	11	.476
Virginia	5	–	9	.357	14	–	15	.483
South Carolina	2	–	12	.143	10	–	17	.370
Clemson	0	–	14	.000	2	–	21	.087
† 1955 ACC tournament winner Rankings from AP Poll

1954–55 Big Seven Conference men's basketball standings
	Conf.				Overall
Team	W		L	PCT	W		L	PCT
No. 15 Colorado	11	–	1	.917	19	–	6	.760
Missouri	9	–	3	.750	16	–	5	.762
Kansas State	6	–	6	.500	11	–	10	.524
Nebraska	6	–	6	.500	9	–	12	.429
Kansas	5	–	7	.417	11	–	10	.524
Iowa State	4	–	8	.333	11	–	10	.524
Oklahoma	1	–	11	.083	3	–	18	.143
Rankings from AP Poll

1954–55 Big Ten Conference men's basketball standings
	Conf.				Overall
Team	W		L	PCT	W		L	PCT
No. 5 Iowa	11	–	3	.786	19	–	7	.731
No. 18 Illinois	10	–	4	.714	17	–	5	.773
No. 11 Minnesota	10	–	4	.714	15	–	7	.682
Michigan State	8	–	6	.571	13	–	9	.591
Northwestern	7	–	7	.500	12	–	10	.545
Purdue	5	–	9	.357	12	–	10	.545
Michigan	5	–	9	.357	11	–	11	.500
Wisconsin	5	–	9	.357	10	–	12	.455
Indiana	5	–	9	.357	8	–	14	.364
Ohio State	4	–	10	.286	10	–	12	.455
Rankings from AP Poll

1954–55 Border Conference men's basketball standings
	Conf.				Overall
Team	W		L	PCT	W		L	PCT
West Texas State	9	–	3	.750	15	–	7	.682
Texas Tech	9	–	3	.750	18	–	7	.720
Texas Western	8	–	4	.667	13	–	8	.619
Arizona State–Tempe	8	–	4	.667	10	–	14	.417
Hardin–Simmons	4	–	8	.333	9	–	15	.375
Arizona	3	–	9	.250	8	–	17	.320
New Mexico A&M	1	–	11	.083	6	–	13	.316
Rankings from AP Poll

1954–55 California Basketball Association men's basketball standings
	Conf.				Overall
Team	W		L	PCT	W		L	PCT
No. 1 San Francisco	12	–	0	1.000	28	–	1	.966
San Jose State	7	–	5	.583	16	–	9	.640
Santa Clara	6	–	6	.500	13	–	11	.542
Pacific	4	–	8	.333	11	–	15	.423
Saint Mary's	1	–	11	.083	6	–	19	.240
Rankings from AP Poll

1954–55 Eastern Intercollegiate Basketball League standings
	Conf.				Overall
Team	W		L	PCT	W		L	PCT
Princeton†	10	–	4	.714	13	–	12	.520
Pennsylvania	10	–	4	.714	19	–	6	.760
Columbia	12	–	5	.706	17	–	8	.680
Dartmouth	9	–	5	.643	18	–	7	.720
Cornell	8	–	6	.571	10	–	13	.435
Brown	3	–	11	.214	7	–	18	.280
Harvard	3	–	11	.214	6	–	17	.261
Yale	3	–	11	.214	3	–	21	.125
† Regular-season championship winner Rankings from AP Poll

1954–55 Metropolitan New York Conference men's basketball standings
	Conf.				Overall
Team	W		L	PCT	W		L	PCT
Manhattan	6	–	0	1.000	18	–	5	.783
St. John's	5	–	11	.313	9	–	0	1.000
Fordham	3	–	2	.600	18	–	9	.667
St. Francis (NY)	3	–	3	.500	18	–	8	.692
Brooklyn	1	–	3	.250	7	–	11	.389
NYU	1	–	3	.250	7	–	13	.350
CCNY	0	–	6	.000	8	–	10	.444
Rankings from AP Poll

1954–55 Mid-American Conference men's basketball standings
	Conf.				Overall
Team	W		L	PCT	W		L	PCT
Miami (Ohio)	11	–	3	.786	14	–	9	.609
Marshall	10	–	4	.714	17	–	4	.810
Ohio	9	–	5	.643	16	–	5	.762
Western Michigan	9	–	5	.643	12	–	10	.545
Kent State	5	–	9	.357	8	–	14	.364
Bowling Green	5	–	9	.357	6	–	16	.273
Toledo	4	–	10	.286	5	–	17	.227
Western Reserve	3	–	11	.214	8	–	14	.364
Rankings from AP Poll

1954–55 Missouri Valley Conference men's basketball standings
	Conf.				Overall
Team	W		L	PCT	W		L	PCT
No. 16 Tulsa	8	–	2	.800	21	–	7	.750
No. 20 Saint Louis	8	–	2	.800	20	–	8	.714
Oklahoma A&M	5	–	5	.500	12	–	13	.480
Wichita Municipal	4	–	6	.400	17	–	9	.654
Houston	3	–	7	.300	15	–	10	.600
Detroit	2	–	8	.200	15	–	11	.577
Rankings from AP Poll

1954–55 Mountain States Conference men's basketball standings
	Conf.				Overall
Team	W		L	PCT	W		L	PCT
No. 7 Utah	13	–	1	.929	24	–	4	.857
BYU	10	–	4	.714	13	–	13	.500
Utah State	9	–	5	.643	15	–	7	.682
Wyoming	9	–	5	.643	17	–	9	.654
Colorado A&M	5	–	9	.357	11	–	12	.478
Montana	4	–	10	.286	12	–	14	.462
Denver	4	–	10	.286	9	–	14	.391
New Mexico	2	–	12	.143	7	–	17	.292
Rankings from AP Poll

1954–55 Ohio Valley Conference men's basketball standings
	Conf.				Overall
Team	W		L	PCT	W		L	PCT
Western Kentucky State	8	–	2	.800	18	–	10	.643
Eastern Kentucky State†	6	–	4	.600	15	–	8	.652
Murray State	6	–	4	.600	11	–	15	.423
Morehead State		–		–	14	–	10	.583
Tennessee Tech		–		–	9	–	11	.450
Middle Tennessee		–		–	11	–	16	.407
† Ohio Valley Conference Tournament winner Rankings from AP Poll

1954–55 Pacific Coast Conference men's basketball standings
	Conf.				Overall
Team	W		L	PCT	W		L	PCT
North
No. 10 Oregon State †	15	–	1	.938	22	–	8	.733
Oregon	8	–	8	.500	13	–	13	.500
Washington	7	–	9	.438	13	–	12	.520
Washington State	5	–	11	.313	11	–	15	.423
Idaho	5	–	11	.313	8	–	18	.308
South
No. 13 UCLA	11	–	1	.917	21	–	5	.808
Stanford	7	–	5	.583	17	–	8	.680
USC	5	–	7	.417	14	–	11	.560
California	1	–	11	.083	9	–	16	.360
† Conference playoff series winner Rankings from AP Poll

1954–55 Southeastern Conference men's basketball standings
	Conf.				Overall
Team	W		L	PCT	W		L	PCT
No. 2 Kentucky	12	–	2	.857	23	–	3	.885
No. 12 Alabama	11	–	3	.786	19	–	5	.792
No. 17 Vanderbilt	9	–	5	.643	16	–	6	.727
Tulane	9	–	5	.643	14	–	6	.700
Tennessee	8	–	6	.571	15	–	7	.682
Georgia Tech	7	–	7	.500	12	–	13	.480
Georgia	7	–	7	.500	9	–	16	.360
Auburn	6	–	8	.429	11	–	9	.550
Florida	5	–	9	.357	12	–	10	.545
Ole Miss	5	–	9	.357	8	–	15	.348
LSU	3	–	11	.214	6	–	18	.250
Mississippi State	2	–	12	.143	6	–	17	.261
Rankings from AP Poll

1954–55 Southern Conference men's basketball standings
	Conf.				Overall
Team	W		L	PCT	W		L	PCT
No. 19 West Virginia †	9	–	1	.900	19	–	11	.633
No. 14 George Washington	8	–	2	.800	24	–	6	.800
Richmond	10	–	4	.714	19	–	9	.679
Washington and Lee	8	–	5	.615	16	–	13	.552
Furman	6	–	4	.600	17	–	10	.630
William & Mary	7	–	5	.583	11	–	14	.440
Davidson	4	–	6	.400	8	–	13	.381
VMI	4	–	9	.308	8	–	15	.348
Virginia Tech	4	–	14	.222	7	–	20	.259
The Citadel	0	–	10	.000	0	–	17	.000
† Southern Conference Tournament winner Rankings from AP Poll

1954–55 Southwest Conference men's basketball standings
	Conf.				Overall
Team	W		L	PCT	W		L	PCT
SMU	9	–	3	.750	15	–	10	.600
TCU	8	–	4	.667	17	–	7	.708
Arkansas	8	–	4	.667	14	–	9	.609
Baylor	7	–	5	.583	13	–	11	.542
Rice	6	–	6	.500	10	–	12	.455
Texas	3	–	9	.250	4	–	20	.167
Texas A&M	1	–	11	.083	4	–	20	.167
Rankings from AP Poll

1954–55 Western New York Little Three Conference men's basketball standings
	Conf.				Overall
Team	W		L	PCT	W		L	PCT
Niagara	3	–	1	.750	20	–	6	.769
Canisius	2	–	2	.500	18	–	7	.720
St. Bonaventure	1	–	3	.250	13	–	10	.565
Rankings from AP Poll

1954–55 Yankee Conference men's basketball standings
	Conf.				Overall
Team	W		L	PCT	W		L	PCT
Connecticut	7	–	0	1.000	20	–	5	.800
Vermont	4	–	1	.800	6	–	15	.286
Massachusetts	4	–	2	.667	10	–	14	.417
Rhode Island	5	–	3	.625	17	–	10	.630
Maine	1	–	7	.125	4	–	13	.235
New Hampshire	1	–	9	.100	4	–	14	.222

=== Major independents ===
A total of 44 college teams played as major independents. Among them, Holy Cross (24–3) had the best winning percentage (.889) and La Salle (26–5) finished with the most wins.

1954–55 NCAA men's basketball independents standings
	Conf.				Overall
Team	W		L	PCT	W		L	PCT
No. 8 Marquette		–		–	24	–	3	.889
Lafayette		–		–	23	–	3	.885
No. 9 Dayton		–		–	25	–	4	.862
No. 6 Duquesne		–		–	22	–	4	.846
No. 3 La Salle		–		–	26	–	5	.839
Seattle		–		–	22	–	7	.759
Holy Cross		–		–	19	–	7	.731
DePaul		–		–	16	–	6	.727
Cincinnati		–		–	21	–	8	.724
Louisville		–		–	19	–	8	.704
Seton Hall		–		–	17	–	9	.654
Penn State		–		–	18	–	10	.643
Villanova		–		–	18	–	10	.643
Loyola (Calif.)		–		–	16	–	9	.640
John Carroll		–		–	14	–	9	.609
Loyola (La.)		–		–	14	–	9	.609
Notre Dame		–		–	14	–	10	.583
Gonzaga		–		–	15	–	11	.577
Muhlenberg		–		–	14	–	11	.560
Colgate		–		–	11	–	9	.550
Navy		–		–	11	–	9	.550
Loyola (Ill.)		–		–	13	–	11	.542
Valparaiso		–		–	13	–	11	.542
Temple		–		–	11	–	10	.524
Army		–		–	9	–	9	.500
Xavier		–		–	13	–	13	.500
Georgetown		–		–	12	–	13	.480
Iona		–		–	10	–	11	.476
Lehigh		–		–	10	–	11	.476
Syracuse		–		–	10	–	11	.476
Saint Joseph's		–		–	12	–	14	.462
Miami (Fla.)		–		–	9	–	11	.450
Drake		–		–	9	–	12	.429
Butler		–		–	10	–	14	.417
Portland		–		–	9	–	13	.409
Pittsburgh		–		–	10	–	16	.385
Washington University		–		–	8	–	14	.364
Oklahoma City		–		–	9	–	18	.333
Bradley		–		–	9	–	20	.310
Boston College		–		–	8	–	18	.308
Creighton		–		–	5	–	14	.263
Siena		–		–	3	–	13	.188
Bucknell		–		–	3	–	18	.143
Rutgers		–		–	2	–	22	.083
Rankings from AP Poll

== Post-season tournaments ==
=== NCAA tournament ===
==== Final Four ====
National semifinals
Iowa	73
La Salle	76
Colorado	50
San Francisco	62

National finals
La Salle	63
San Francisco	77
Third place
Iowa	54
Colorado	75

=== National Invitation tournament ===
==== Semifinals & finals ====
Semifinals
Duquesne	65
Cincinnati	61
St. Francis (Pa.)	73
Dayton	79

Finals
Duquesne	70
Dayton	58
Third place
Cincinnati	96
St. Francis (Pa.)	91

== Awards ==
=== Consensus All-American teams ===
Consensus First Team
Player	Position	Class	Team
Dick Garmaker	G	Senior	Minnesota
Tom Gola	F	Senior	La Salle
Sihugo Green	G	Junior	Duquesne
Dick Ricketts	F/C	Senior	Duquesne
Bill Russell	C	Junior	San Francisco

Consensus Second Team
Player	Position	Class	Team
Darrell Floyd	G	Junior	Furman
Robin Freeman	G	Junior	Ohio State
Dickie Hemric	C	Senior	Wake Forest
Don Schlundt	C	Senior	Indiana
Ronnie Shavlik	F/C	Junior	North Carolina State

=== Major player of the year awards ===
- Helms Player of the Year: Bill Russell, San Francisco
- UP Player of the Year: Tom Gola, La Salle

=== Major coach of the year awards ===
- UP Coach of the Year: Phil Woolpert, San Francisco

=== Other major awards ===
- NIT/Haggerty Award (Top player in New York City metro area): Ed Conlin, Fordham

== Coaching changes ==
A number of teams changed coaches during the season and after it ended.

Team	Former Coach	Interim Coach	New Coach	Reason
The Citadel	Jim Browning		Hank Witt	
Creighton	Sebastian Salerno		Theron Thomsen	
Davidson	Danny Miller		Tom Scott	
Holy Cross	Buster Sheary		Roy Leenig	
Indiana State	John Longfellow	Paul Wolf	Duane Klueh	Longfellow retired after 7 games into the season due to health issues. Paul Wolf stepped in to finish the season.
Kent State	Clarence Haerr		David E. McDowell	
La Salle	Ken Loeffler		Jim Pollard	Loeffler left to coach Texas A&M.
Lafayette	Butch van Breda Kolff		George Davidson	
Maine	Russell DeVette		Harold Woodbury	
Marshall	Cam Henderson		Jule Rivlin	
Mississippi State	Paul Gregory		Babe McCarthy	
Montana	George Dahlberg		Frosty Cox	
Montana State	Wally Lemm		Dobbie Lambert	
New Mexico	Woody Clements		Bill Stockton	
Oklahoma	Bruce Drake		Doyle Parrack	
Oklahoma City	Doyle Parrack		Abe Lemons	
Portland	Art McLarney	Mike Tichy	Al Negratti	
Saint Joseph's	John McMenamin		Jack Ramsay	
Saint Mary's	Thomas Foley		Jim Weaver	
Tennessee Tech	Raymond Brown		John Oldham	
Texas A&M	John Floyd		Ken Loeffler	
Virginia Tech	Red Laird		Chuck Noe	
VMI	Chuck Noe		Jack Null	Noe left to coach Virginia Tech.
