= UConn Huskies men's basketball statistical leaders =

The UConn Huskies men's basketball statistical leaders are individual statistical leaders of the UConn Huskies men's basketball program in various categories, including points, three-pointers, assists, blocks, rebounds, and steals. Within those areas, the lists identify single-game, single-season, and career leaders. The Huskies represent the University of Connecticut in the NCAA Division I Big East Conference.

UConn began competing in intercollegiate basketball in 1900. However, the school's record book does not generally list records from before the 1950s, as records from before this period are often incomplete and inconsistent. Since scoring was much lower in this era, and teams played much fewer games during a typical season, it is likely that few or no players from this era would appear on these lists anyway.

The NCAA did not officially record assists as a stat until the 1983–84 season, and blocks and steals until the 1985–86 season, but UConn's record books includes players in these stats before these seasons. These lists are updated through the end of the 2020–21 season.

Players active in the 2026–27 season are in bold type.

== Scoring ==
Career
Rk	Player	Points	Seasons
1	Chris Smith	2,145	1988–89 1989–90 1990–91 1991–92
2	Richard Hamilton	2,036	1996–97 1997–98 1998–99
3	Tony Hanson	1,990	1973–74 1974–75 1975–76 1976–77
4	Shabazz Napier	1,959	2010–11 2011–12 2012–13 2013–14
5	Ray Allen	1,922	1993–94 1994–95 1995–96
6	Alex Karaban	1,880	2022–23 2023–24 2024–25 2025–26
7	Corny Thompson	1,810	1978–79 1979–80 1980–81 1981–82
8	Ben Gordon	1,795	2001–02 2002–03 2003–04
9	Ryan Boatright	1,786	2011–12 2012–13 2013–14 2014–15
10	Kemba Walker	1,783	2008–09 2009–10 2010–11

Season
Rk	Player	Points	Season
1	Kemba Walker	965	2010–11
2	Donyell Marshall	855	1993–94
3	Ray Allen	818	1995–96
4	Richard Hamilton	795	1997–98
5	Richard Hamilton	732	1998–99
6	Ben Gordon	732	2003–04
7	Shabazz Napier	720	2013–14
8	Tony Hanson	702	1976–77
9	Caron Butler	691	2001–02
10	Ray Allen	675	1994–95

Single game
Rk	Player	Points	Season	Opponent
1	Bill Corley	51	1967–68	New Hampshire
2	Wes Bialosuknia	50	1966–67	Maine
3	Art Quimby	49	1954–55	Boston College
4	Art Quimby	46	1954–55	Maine
5	Toby Kimball	43	1963–64	Colgate
	Art Quimby	43	1954–55	New Hampshire
	Al Weston	43	1972–73	Boston University
8	Kemba Walker	42	2010–11	Vermont
	Clifford Robinson	42	1987–88	Hartford
	Tony Hanson	42	1976–77	Vermont
	Wes Bialosuknia	42	1966–67	N. Hampshire
	Donyell Marshall	42	1993–94	St. John's
	Donyell Marshall	42	1993–94	St. John's

== Rebounds ==
Career
Rk	Player	Rebounds	Seasons
1	Art Quimby	1,716	1951–52 1952–53 1953–54 1954–55
2	Toby Kimball	1,324	1962–63 1963–64 1964–65
3	Jeff Adrien	1,126	2005–06 2006–07 2007–08 2008–09
4	Emeka Okafor	1,091	2001–02 2002–03 2003–04
5	John Thomas	1,023	1972–73 1973–74 1974–75 1975–76
6	Corny Thompson	1,017	1978–79 1979–80 1980–81 1981–82
7	Bill Corley	986	1965–66 1966–67 1967–68
8	Kevin Freeman	913	1996–97 1997–98 1998–99 1999–00
9	Jake Voskuhl	880	1996–97 1997–98 1998–99 1999–00
10	Hasheem Thabeet	847	2006–07 2007–08 2008–09

Season
Rk	Player	Rebounds	Season
1	Art Quimby	611	1954–55
2	Art Quimby	588	1953–54
3	Toby Kimball	483	1964–65
4	Toby Kimball	466	1963–64
5	Art Quimby	430	1952–53
6	Emeka Okafor	415	2003–04
7	John Thomas	402	1975–76
8	Burr Carlson	391	1951–52
9	Hasheem Thabeet	388	2008–09
10	Toby Kimball	375	1962–63

Single game
Rk	Player	Rebounds	Season	Opponent
1	Art Quimby	40	1954–55	Boston University
2	Toby Kimball	34	1964–65	New Hampshire

== Assists ==
Career
Rk	Player	Assists	Seasons
1	Taliek Brown	722	2000–01 2001–02 2002–03 2003–04
2	Tate George	677	1986–87 1987–88 1988–89 1989–90
3	Shabazz Napier	646	2010–11 2011–12 2012–13 2013–14
4	Kevin Ollie	619	1991–92 1992–93 1993–94 1994–95
5	Doron Sheffer	559	1993–94 1994–95 1995–96
6	Karl Hobbs	534	1980–81 1981–82 1982–83 1983–84
7	Jalen Adams	511	2015–16 2016–17 2017–18 2018–19
8	Ricky Moore	510	1995–96 1996–97 1997–98 1998–99
	Marcus Williams	510	2003–04 2004–05 2005–06
10	Ryan Boatright	491	2011–12 2012–13 2013–14 2014–15

Season
Rk	Player	Assists	Season
1	Taliek Brown	253	2003–04
2	Tristen Newton	248	2023–24
3	Marcus Williams	243	2004–05
4	**Silas Demary Jr.**	229	2025–26
5	Doron Sheffer	212	1995–96
	Kevin Ollie	212	1994–95
7	Kevin Ollie	209	1993–94
8	Hassan Diarra	200	2024–25
9	Marcus Williams	198	2005–06
	Shabazz Napier	198	2011–12

Single game
Rk	Player	Assists	Season	Opponent
1	Marcus Williams	16	2004–05	Notre Dame
	Marcus Williams	16	2004–05	CCSU
3	**Silas Demary Jr.**	15	2025–26	Providence
4	Craig Austrie	14	2005–06	Quinnipiac
	Kevin Ollie	14	1994–95	Boston College
	Kevin Ollie	14	1993–94	Tennessee Tech
	Earl Kelley	14	1985–86	Boston University
8	Tristen Newton	13	2023–24	Manhattan
	Shabazz Napier	13	2011–12	Coppin State
	Shabazz Napier	13	2011–12	Holy Cross
	Marcus Williams	13	2005–06	Notre Dame
	Marcus Williams	13	2004–05	Providence
	Taliek Brown	13	2003–04	Miami
	Marcus Williams	13	2003–04	Sacred Heart
	Earl Kelley	13	1985–86	Central Connecticut

== Steals ==
Career
Rk	Player	Steals	Seasons
1	Scott Burrell	310	1989–90 1990–91 1991–92 1992–93
2	Shabazz Napier	251	2010–11 2011–12 2012–13 2013–14
3	Christian Vital	215	2016–17 2017–18 2018–19 2019–20
4	Tate George	201	1986–87 1987–88 1988–89 1989–90
5	Doron Sheffer	194	1993–94 1994–95 1995–96
6	Chris Smith	193	1988–89 1989–90 1990–91 1991–92
7	Jerome Dyson	188	2006–07 2007–08 2008–09 2009–10
8	Khalid El-Amin	186	1997–98 1998–99 1999–2000
9	Kemba Walker	185	2008–09 2009–10 2010–11
10	Ryan Boatright	180	2011–12 2012–13 2013–14 2014–15

Season
Rk	Player	Steals	Season
1	Nadav Henefeld	138	1989–90
2	Scott Burrell	112	1990–91
3	Bobby Dulin	83	1979–80
4	Doron Sheffer	79	1993–94
5	Christian Vital	78	2019–20
6	Kemba Walker	77	2010–11
7	Scott Burrell	75	1991–92
8	Tate George	74	1989–90
9	Shabazz Napier	73	2013–14
10	Caron Butler	71	2001–02

Single game
Rk	Player	Steals	Season	Opponent
1	Jerome Dyson	9	2007–08	St. John's
	Scott Burrell	9	1990–91	Maine
3	Richard Hamilton	8	1997–98	Boston University
	Bobby Dulin	8	1979–80	New Hampshire
	Bobby Dulin	8	1979–80	Providence

== Blocks ==
Career
Rk	Player	Blocks	Seasons
1	Emeka Okafor	441	2001–02 2002–03 2003–04
2	Hasheem Thabeet	417	2006–07 2007–08 2008–09
3	Amida Brimah	367	2013–14 2014–15 2015–16 2016–17
4	Donyell Marshall	245	1991–92 1992–93 1993–94
5	Josh Boone	222	2003–04 2004–05 2005–06
6	Isaiah Whaley	212	2017–18 2018–19 2019–20 2020–21 2021–22
7	Jake Voskuhl	193	1996–97 1997–98 1998–99 1999–00
8	Hilton Armstrong	191	2002–03 2003–04 2004–05 2005–06
9	Travis Knight	179	1992–93 1993–94 1994–95 1995–96
10	Alex Oriakhi	166	2009–10 2010–11 2011–12

Season
Rk	Player	Blocks	Season
1	Emeka Okafor	156	2002–03
2	Hasheem Thabeet	152	2008–09
3	Hasheem Thabeet	147	2007–08
	Emeka Okafor	147	2003–04
5	Emeka Okafor	138	2001–02
6	Amida Brimah	121	2014–15
7	Hasheem Thabeet	118	2006–07
8	Donyell Marshall	111	1993–94
9	Hilton Armstrong	107	2005–06
10	Andre Drummond	92	2011–12
	Amida Brimah	92	2013–14

Single game
Rk	Player	Blocks	Season	Opponent
1	Hasheem Thabeet	10	2008–09	Providence
	Hasheem Thabeet	10	2007–08	Notre Dame
	Hasheem Thabeet	10	2006–07	Texas Southern
	Emeka Okafor	10	2003–04	Army
	Donyell Marshall	10	1993–94	Hartford
6	Amida Brimah	9	2015–16	Maine
	Hasheem Thabeet	9	2008–09	Seton Hall
	Hasheem Thabeet	9	2007–08	Florida A&M
	Hasheem Thabeet	9	2006–07	Fairfield
	Hilton Armstrong	9	2005–06	Louisville
	Josh Boone	9	2004–05	St. John's
	Emeka Okafor	9	2003–04	Oklahoma
	Emeka Okafor	9	2001–02	Arizona
	Emeka Okafor	9	2001–02	Rutgers
	Emeka Okafor	9	2001–02	Boston College
	Clifford Robinson	9	1987–88	Georgetown

== See also ==
- UConn Huskies women's basketball statistical leaders
