= 1954–55 Georgia Bulldogs basketball team =

American college basketball season

1954–55 Georgia Bulldogs basketball
- Conference: Southeastern Conference
- Record: 9–16 (7–7 SEC)
- Head coach: Harbin Lawson (4th season)
- Captain: Lamar Potts
- Home arena: Woodruff Hall

1954–55 Southeastern Conference men's basketball standings
	Conf.				Overall
Team	W		L	PCT	W		L	PCT
No. 2 Kentucky	12	–	2	.857	23	–	3	.885
No. 12 Alabama	11	–	3	.786	19	–	5	.792
No. 17 Vanderbilt	9	–	5	.643	16	–	6	.727
Tulane	9	–	5	.643	14	–	6	.700
Tennessee	8	–	6	.571	15	–	7	.682
Georgia Tech	7	–	7	.500	12	–	13	.480
Georgia	7	–	7	.500	9	–	16	.360
Auburn	6	–	8	.429	11	–	9	.550
Florida	5	–	9	.357	12	–	10	.545
Ole Miss	5	–	9	.357	8	–	15	.348
LSU	3	–	11	.214	6	–	18	.250
Mississippi State	2	–	12	.143	6	–	17	.261
Rankings from AP Poll

The 1954–55 Georgia Bulldogs basketball team represented the University of Georgia as a member of the Southeastern Conference (SEC) during the 1954–55 NCAA men's basketball season. Led by fourth-year head coach Harbin Lawson, the Bulldogs compiled an overall record of 9–16 with a mark of 7–7 conference play, tying for sixth place in the SEC. The team captain was Lamar Potts.

== Roster ==
1954–55 Georgia Bulldogs men's basketball team
Players
Coaches

Pos.	#	Name	Height	Weight	Year	Previous school	Hometown
G		Murphy McManus	6 ft 0 in (1.83 m)	—	Sr
G		Morris Dinwiddie	5 ft 10 in (1.78 m)	—	Jr
F		Lamar Potts	6 ft 4 in (1.93 m)	—	Sr
F		Bill Ensley	6 ft 5 in (1.96 m)	—	So
F		Horace Knight	6 ft 2 in (1.88 m)	—
C		Al Parrish	6 ft 6 in (1.98 m)	—	Sr
F		Ronald Bradley	6 ft 0 in (1.83 m)	—	Jr
G		Virgil Mills	6 ft 2 in (1.88 m)	—
F		Billy Howard	—	—
G		W.C. Jones	6 ft 0 in (1.83 m)	—
F		George Bell	6 ft 3 in (1.91 m)	—	Jr
F		John Cummings	6 ft 1 in (1.85 m)	—
F		Billy Joe Groover	—	—

Head coach

Harbin Lawson

Assistant coach(es)

Legend

- (C) Team captain
- (S) Suspended
- (I) Ineligible
- (W) Walk-on
- Injured
- Current redshirt

== Schedule ==
Date time, TV	Opponent	Result	Record	Site city, state
12/3/1954	at South Carolina	L 54-74	0–1	
12/7/1954	Clemson	L 72-74	0–2	Athens, GA
12/11/1954	Mercer	W 95-75	1–2	Athens, GA
12/27/1954	Spring Hill	L 69-78	1–3	Athens, GA
12/28/1954	Florida State	L 87-97	1–4	Athens, GA
1/3/1955	at Florida	L 68-81	1–5	
1/7/1955	Miss. State	W 90-75	2–5	Athens, GA
1/8/1955	LSU	W 76-70	3–5	Athens, GA
1/10/1955	Tulane	W 67-65	4–5	Athens, GA
1/15/1955	at Florida State	L 81-90	4–6	
1/22/1955	Auburn	W 88-83	5–6	Athens, GA
1/24/1955	at Georgia Tech	W 70-66	6–6	
1/26/1955	at Mercer	L 66-68	6–7	
1/29/1955	at Alabama	L 74-101	6–8	
1/31/1955	at Auburn	L 76-78	6–9	
2/7/1955	at Tennessee	L 81-97	6–10	
2/9/1955	at Kentucky	L 40-86	6–11	
2/13/1955	Alabama	L 77-98	6–12	Athens, GA
2/14/1955	Florida State	L 79-88	6–13	Athens, GA
2/17/1955	GeorgiaTech	L 54-75	6–14	Athens, GA
2/19/1955	Ole Miss	W 86-80	7–14	Athens, GA
2/21/1955	at Clemson	L 94-105	7–15	
2/26/1955	at Georgia Tech	W 67-66	8–15	
2/28/1955	at Vanderbilt	L 57-78	8–16	
3/4/1955	Florida	W 69-61	9–16	Athens, GA
*Non-conference game. (#) Tournament seedings in parentheses.
