= 1954–55 Iowa State Cyclones men's basketball team =

American college basketball season

1954–55 Iowa State Cyclones men's basketball
- Conference: Big Seven Conference
- Record: 11–10 (4–8 Big Seven)
- Head coach: Bill Strannigan (1st season)
- Home arena: Iowa State Armory

1954–55 Big Seven Conference men's basketball standings
	Conf.				Overall
Team	W		L	PCT	W		L	PCT
No. 15 Colorado	11	–	1	.917	19	–	6	.760
Missouri	9	–	3	.750	16	–	5	.762
Kansas State	6	–	6	.500	11	–	10	.524
Nebraska	6	–	6	.500	9	–	12	.429
Kansas	5	–	7	.417	11	–	10	.524
Iowa State	4	–	8	.333	11	–	10	.524
Oklahoma	1	–	11	.083	3	–	18	.143
Rankings from AP Poll

The 1954–55 Iowa State Cyclones men's basketball team represented Iowa State University during the 1954–55 NCAA men's basketball season. The Cyclones were coached by Bill Strannigan, who was in his first season with the Cyclones. They played their home games at the Iowa State Armory in Ames, Iowa.

They finished the season 11–10, 4–8 in Big Seven play to finish in sixth place.

== Roster ==
1954–55 Iowa State Cyclones men's basketball team
Players
Coaches

Pos.	#	Name	Height	Weight	Year	Hometown
F	41	Barney Alleman	6 ft 2 in (1.88 m)	—	Sr	Ankeny, Iowa
C	40	Bill Dale	6 ft 5 in (1.96 m)	—	Jr	Lehigh, Iowa
F	33	Don DeKoster	6 ft 3 in (1.91 m)	—		Spencer, Iowa
G	35	Mark DeRuyter	6 ft 2 in (1.88 m)	—		Sioux Center, Iowa
C	30	Chuck Duncan (C)	6 ft 5 in (1.96 m)	—	Sr	Atlantic, Iowa
F	34	Stanley Frahm	6 ft 3 in (1.91 m)	—		Manning, Iowa
G	22	Arnie Gaarde	5 ft 10 in (1.78 m)	—	Jr	Armstrong, Iowa
F	25	Tom LeBuhn	6 ft 3 in (1.91 m)	—		Davenport, Iowa
F	31	Jake Muehlenthaler	6 ft 4 in (1.93 m)	—		Sheldahl, Iowa
F	24	Jack Peterson	6 ft 2 in (1.88 m)	—		Des Moines, Iowa
G	32	Jerry Sandbulte	6 ft 0 in (1.83 m)	—		Sioux Center, Iowa
C	42	Jim Sinning	6 ft 8 in (2.03 m)	—		Marshalltown, Iowa
G	20	Gary Thompson	5 ft 10 in (1.78 m)	—	So	Roland, Iowa
F	21	Chuck Vogt	6 ft 6 in (1.98 m)	—	So	Clinton, Iowa
G	23	Larry Wetter (C)	5 ft 11 in (1.8 m)	—		Rinard, Iowa

Head coach

- Bill Strannigan

Assistant coach(es)

Legend

- (C) Team captain
- (S) Suspended
- (I) Ineligible
- (W) Walk-on
- Injured
- Current redshirt

== Schedule and results ==
Date time, TV	Rank^{#}	Opponent^{#}	Result	Record	Site city, state
Regular season
December 6, 1954*; 7:35 pm		Carleton	W 78–60	1–0	Iowa State Armory; Ames, Iowa
December 11, 1954*; 8:00 pm		at Bradley	L 67–79	1–1	Robertson Memorial Field House; Peoria, Illinois
December 17, 1954*; 7:15 pm		Denver	W 80–59	2–1	Iowa State Armory (4,000); Ames, Iowa
December 18, 1954*; 8:15 pm		Creighton	W 100–65	3–1	Iowa State Armory; Ames, Iowa
December 21, 1954*; 8:45 pm		Drake; Iowa Big Four	W 72–53	4–1	Iowa State Armory; Ames, Iowa
December 28, 1954*; 8:00 pm		vs. No. 20 Kansas; Big Seven Holiday Tournament Quarterfinals	W 82–81	5–1	Municipal Auditorium (10,500); Kansas City, Missouri
December 29, 1954*; 10:00 pm		vs. Kansas State; Big Seven Holiday Tournament Semifinals	L 60–70	5–2	Municipal Auditorium; Kansas City, Missouri
December 30, 1954*; 8:00 pm		vs. Oklahoma; Big Seven Holiday Tournament Third Place	W 71–64	6–2	Municipal Auditorium; Kansas City, Missouri
January 4, 1955; 8:05 pm		at Nebraska	L 63–76	6–3 (0–1)	Nebraska Coliseum; Lincoln, Nebraska
January 8, 1955; 7:35 pm		Kansas State	L 77–78	6–4 (0–2)	Iowa State Armory; Ames, Iowa
January 15, 1955; 7:35 pm		Oklahoma	W 105–78	7–4 (1–2)	Iowa State Armory; Ames, Iowa
January 17, 1955; 7:35 pm		Kansas	L 72–73	7–5 (1–3)	Iowa State Armory; Ames, Iowa
January 22, 1955; 8:00 pm		at Kansas State	L 67–79	7–6 (1–4)	Ahearn Fieldhouse; Manhattan, Kansas
January 24, 1955; 8:05 pm		at Colorado	L 71–78	7–7 (1–5)	Balch Fieldhouse; Boulder, Colorado
February 1, 1955; 7:35 pm		No. 17 Missouri	L 67–84	7–8 (1–6)	Iowa State Armory; Ames, Iowa
February 5, 1955; 7:35 pm		Colorado	L 70–86	7–9 (1–7)	Iowa State Armory; Ames, Iowa
February 8, 1955; 7:30 pm		at Kansas	W 77–59	8–9 (2–7)	Hoch Auditorium; Lawrence, Kansas
February 16, 1955*; 8:15 pm		at Drake; Iowa Big Four	W 82–73	9–9	Drake Fieldhouse; Des Moines, Iowa
February 19, 1955; 8:00 pm		at Missouri	L 63–78	9–10 (2–8)	Brewer Fieldhouse; Columbia, Missouri
February 26, 1955; 7:35 pm		Nebraska	W 82–75	10–10 (3–8)	Iowa State Armory; Ames, Iowa
March 5, 1955; 8:00 pm		at Oklahoma	W 84–71	11–10 (4–8)	OU Field House; Norman, Oklahoma
*Non-conference game. ^{#}Rankings from AP poll. (#) Tournament seedings in parentheses. All times are in Central Time.
