= 1955 Southern Conference men's basketball tournament =

- Classification: Division I
- Season: 1954–55
- Teams: 8
- Site: Richmond Arena; Richmond, VA
- Champions: West Virginia (1st title)
- Winning coach: Fred Schaus (1st title)

1954–55 Southern Conference men's basketball standings
	Conf.				Overall
Team	W		L	PCT	W		L	PCT
No. 19 West Virginia †	9	–	1	.900	19	–	11	.633
No. 14 George Washington	8	–	2	.800	24	–	6	.800
Richmond	10	–	4	.714	19	–	9	.679
Washington and Lee	8	–	5	.615	16	–	13	.552
Furman	6	–	4	.600	17	–	10	.630
William & Mary	7	–	5	.583	11	–	14	.440
Davidson	4	–	6	.400	8	–	13	.381
VMI	4	–	9	.308	8	–	15	.348
Virginia Tech	4	–	14	.222	7	–	20	.259
The Citadel	0	–	10	.000	0	–	17	.000
† Southern Conference Tournament winner Rankings from AP Poll

The 1955 Southern Conference men's basketball tournament took place from March 3–5, 1955 at the Richmond Arena in Richmond, Virginia. The West Virginia Mountaineers, led by head coach Fred Schaus, won their first Southern Conference title and received the automatic berth to the 1955 NCAA tournament.

== Format ==
The top eight finishers of the conference's ten members were eligible for the tournament. Teams were seeded based on conference winning percentage. The tournament used a preset bracket consisting of three rounds.

== Bracket ==
Quarterfinals; March 3
1	West Virginia	73
8	VMI	66
4	Washington and Lee	97
5	Furman	63
2	#13 George Washington	74
7	Davidson	36
3	Richmond	90
6	William & Mary	75

Semifinals; March 4
1	West Virginia	89
4	Washington and Lee	74
2	#13 George Washington	67
3	Richmond	65

Finals; March 5
1	West Virginia	58
2	#13 George Washington	48

* Overtime game

== See also ==
- List of Southern Conference men's basketball champions
