= 1954–55 Washington Huskies men's basketball team =

American college basketball season

1954–55 Washington Huskies men's basketball
- Conference: Pacific Coast Conference
- Record: 13–12 (7–9 PCC)
- Head coach: Tippy Dye (5th season)
- Home arena: Hec Edmundson Pavilion

1954–55 Pacific Coast Conference men's basketball standings
	Conf.				Overall
Team	W		L	PCT	W		L	PCT
North
No. 10 Oregon State †	15	–	1	.938	22	–	8	.733
Oregon	8	–	8	.500	13	–	13	.500
Washington	7	–	9	.438	13	–	12	.520
Washington State	5	–	11	.313	11	–	15	.423
Idaho	5	–	11	.313	8	–	18	.308
South
No. 13 UCLA	11	–	1	.917	21	–	5	.808
Stanford	7	–	5	.583	17	–	8	.680
USC	5	–	7	.417	14	–	11	.560
California	1	–	11	.083	9	–	16	.360
† Conference playoff series winner Rankings from AP Poll

The 1954–55 Washington Huskies men's basketball team represented the University of Washington for the 1954–55 NCAA college basketball season. Led by fifth-year head coach Tippy Dye, the Huskies were members of the Pacific Coast Conference and played their home games on campus at Hec Edmundson Pavilion in Seattle, Washington.

The Huskies were 13–12 overall in the regular season and 7–9 in conference play, third in the Northern division standings.
