= Art Quimby =

American college basketball standout

Personal information
- Born: July 1, 1933 New London, Connecticut, U.S.
- Died: December 6, 2010 (aged 77) Columbia, Connecticut, U.S.
- Listed height: 6 ft 5 in (1.96 m)

Career information
- High school: Bulkeley (New London, Connecticut)
- College: UConn (1951–1955)
- NBA draft: 1955: 7th round, 48th overall pick
- Drafted by: Rochester Royals
- Position: Center
- Number: 25

Career highlights
- NCAA rebounding leader (1954); 3× First-team All-Yankee Conference
- Stats at Basketball Reference

Arthur R. Quimby Jr. (July 1, 1933 – December 6, 2010) was an American college basketball player from the University of Connecticut.

== Early life ==
A native of New London, Connecticut, Quimby attended the Bulkeley School, which was a small all-boys school whose basketball program was generally very good. He led the team to undefeated state and New England championships as a senior and was heavily recruited by college teams. Quimby was initially going to attend the University of Kentucky (UK) to play for Adolph Rupp, but due to a scandal at UK he decided to attend Connecticut.

== College ==
During Quimby's career as a Huskie he compiled an 80–19 overall record. He led them to four Yankee Conference championships and was a three-time First Team All-Conference selection. During his junior and senior seasons, Quimby led the National Collegiate Athletic Association (NCAA) in total rebounds. As a junior, he led the nation in rebounding average. In 1954, Connecticut earned a berth in the NCAA Division I men's basketball tournament, and in 1955 they earned their first-ever National Invitation Tournament (NIT) bid. They lost the opening round games of each tournament.

Quimby is the Huskies' all-time leader in rebounds for a single game (40), single season (611) and career (1,716). He also owns the single season and career rebounding averages (24.4 and 21.5 per game, respectively). Quimby's combined career point and rebound totals (3,114) are more than any other Connecticut player.

== Later life ==
After his college career ended, Quimby was selected by the Rochester Royals in the 1955 NBA draft after his territorial rights had been traded by the Boston Celtics. There was not enough money in professional basketball at the time for Quimby to want to play, so instead he spent the rest of his life as an educator after service with the military, serving in the Army Reserve as an officer.

== See also ==
- List of NCAA Division I men's basketball players with 30 or more rebounds in a game
- List of NCAA Division I men's basketball season rebounding leaders
- List of NCAA Division I men's basketball career rebounding leaders

== Statistics ==
Art Quimby Statistics at University of Connecticut
Year	G	FG	FGA	PCT	3FG	3FGA	PCT	FT	FTA	PCT	REB	AVG	A	TO	B	S	MIN	PTS	AVG
1951–52	27	18	74	0.243	—	—	N/A	8	15	0.533	87	3.22		—	—	—		44	1.6
1952–53	21	125	307	0.407	—	—	N/A	100	168	0.595	430	20.47		—	—	—		350	16.7
1953–54	26	158			—	—	N/A	107			588	22.61		—	—	—		423	16.3
1954–55	25	227	546	0.415	—	—	N/A	127	248	0.512	611	24.44		—	—	—		581	23.2
Totals	99	528			—	—	N/A	342			1,716	21.5		—	—	—		1,398	14.12
