= 1954–55 Washington State Cougars men's basketball team =

American college basketball season

1954–55 Washington State Cougars men's basketball
- Conference: Pacific Coast Conference
- Record: 11–15 (5–11 PCC)
- Head coach: Jack Friel (27th season)
- Home arena: Bohler Gymnasium

1954–55 Pacific Coast Conference men's basketball standings
	Conf.				Overall
Team	W		L	PCT	W		L	PCT
North
No. 10 Oregon State †	15	–	1	.938	22	–	8	.733
Oregon	8	–	8	.500	13	–	13	.500
Washington	7	–	9	.438	13	–	12	.520
Washington State	5	–	11	.313	11	–	15	.423
Idaho	5	–	11	.313	8	–	18	.308
South
No. 13 UCLA	11	–	1	.917	21	–	5	.808
Stanford	7	–	5	.583	17	–	8	.680
USC	5	–	7	.417	14	–	11	.560
California	1	–	11	.083	9	–	16	.360
† Conference playoff series winner Rankings from AP Poll

The 1954–55 Washington State Cougars men's basketball team represented Washington State College for the 1954–55 NCAA college basketball season. Led by 27th-year head coach Jack Friel, the Cougars were members of the Pacific Coast Conference and played their home games on campus at Bohler Gymnasium in Pullman, Washington.

The Cougars were 11–15 overall in the regular season and 5–11 in conference play, tied for last in the Northern division standings.
