= Bebe Lee =

American basketball coach

Biographical details
- Born: December 3, 1916; Dallas, Texas, U.S.
- Died: March 31, 2013 (aged 96); Southport, North Carolina, U.S.

Playing career
- 1942–1945: Stanford

Coaching career (HC unless noted)
- 1945–1947: Utah State
- 1949–1950: Colorado State
- 1950–1956: Colorado

Administrative career (AD unless noted)
- 1956–1968: Kansas State

Head coaching record
- Overall: 91–119
- Tournaments: 3–3 (NCAA)

Accomplishments and honors

Championships
- 2 Big Seven (1954, 1955); NCAA Final Four (1955)

Awards
- National Association of Collegiate Directors of Athletics Hall of Fame

H. B. "Bebe" Lee (December 3, 1916 – March 31, 2013) was a college men's basketball coach and athletics administrator. He was the head coach of Utah State from 1945 to 1947, Colorado State from 1949 to 1950, and Colorado from 1950 to 1956. He coached his teams to a 91–119 record, winning two Big Seven Conference championships and made the 1955 Final Four in two NCAA tournament appearances. He also served as Kansas State's athletic director from 1956 to 1968. He played college basketball at Stanford.

== Head coaching record ==
Record table
| Season | Team | Overall | Conference | Standing | Postseason |
|---|---|---|---|---|---|
Utah State Aggies (Mountain States Conference) (1945–1947)
| 1945–46 | Utah State | 7–12 | 2–10 | 6th | |
| 1946–47 | Utah State | 14–10 | 6–6 | T–3rd | |
| Utah State: | | 21–22 (.488) | 8–16 (.333) | | |
Colorado State Rams (Mountain States Conference) (1949–1950)
| 1949–50 | Colorado State | 7–23 | 2–18 | 6th | |
| Colorado State: | | 7–23 (.233) | 2–18 (.100) | | |
Colorado Buffaloes (Big Seven Conference) (1950–1956)
| 1950–51 | Colorado | 4–20 | 2–10 | 7th | |
| 1951–52 | Colorado | 8–16 | 4–8 | T–4th | |
| 1952–53 | Colorado | 10–11 | 3–9 | 7th | |
| 1953–54 | Colorado | 11–11 | 10–2 | T–1st | NCAA Regional Fourth Place |
| 1954–55 | Colorado | 19–6 | 11–1 | 1st | NCAA Final Four |
| 1955–56 | Colorado | 11–10 | 7–5 | 4th | |
| Colorado: | | 63–74 (.460) | 37–35 (.514) | | |
| Total: | | 91–119 (.433) | | | |
National champion Postseason invitational champion Conference regular season champion Conference regular season and conference tournament champion Division regular season champion Division regular season and conference tournament champion Conference tournament champion

== See also ==
- List of NCAA Division I Men's Final Four appearances by coach
