= 1954–55 Idaho Vandals men's basketball team =

American college basketball season

1954–55 Idaho Vandals men's basketball
- Conference: Pacific Coast Conference
- Record: 8–18 (5–11 PCC)
- Head coach: Harlan Hodges (1st season)
- Assistant coach: Clem Parberry
- Home arena: Memorial Gymnasium

1954–55 Pacific Coast Conference men's basketball standings
	Conf.				Overall
Team	W		L	PCT	W		L	PCT
North
No. 10 Oregon State †	15	–	1	.938	22	–	8	.733
Oregon	8	–	8	.500	13	–	13	.500
Washington	7	–	9	.438	13	–	12	.520
Washington State	5	–	11	.313	11	–	15	.423
Idaho	5	–	11	.313	8	–	18	.308
South
No. 13 UCLA	11	–	1	.917	21	–	5	.808
Stanford	7	–	5	.583	17	–	8	.680
USC	5	–	7	.417	14	–	11	.560
California	1	–	11	.083	9	–	16	.360
† Conference playoff series winner Rankings from AP Poll

The 1954–55 Idaho Vandals men's basketball team represented the University of Idaho during the 1954–55 NCAA college basketball season. Members of the Pacific Coast Conference, the Vandals were led by first-year head coach Harlan Hodges and played their home games on campus at Memorial Gymnasium in Moscow, Idaho.

The Vandals were 8–18 overall and 5–11 in conference play.

Hodges was hired in May 1954, after six seasons as head coach at Murray State in Kentucky.
