= 1954–55 UCLA Bruins men's basketball team =

American college basketball season

1954–55 UCLA Bruins men's basketball

PCC Southern Division
- Conference: Pacific Coast Conference

Ranking
- Coaches: No. 12
- AP: No. 13
- Record: 21–5 (11–1 PCC)
- Head coach: John R. Wooden (7th season)
- Assistant coach: Doug Sale
- Home arena: Men's Gym

1954–55 Pacific Coast Conference men's basketball standings
	Conf.				Overall
Team	W		L	PCT	W		L	PCT
North
No. 10 Oregon State †	15	–	1	.938	22	–	8	.733
Oregon	8	–	8	.500	13	–	13	.500
Washington	7	–	9	.438	13	–	12	.520
Washington State	5	–	11	.313	11	–	15	.423
Idaho	5	–	11	.313	8	–	18	.308
South
No. 13 UCLA	11	–	1	.917	21	–	5	.808
Stanford	7	–	5	.583	17	–	8	.680
USC	5	–	7	.417	14	–	11	.560
California	1	–	11	.083	9	–	16	.360
† Conference playoff series winner Rankings from AP Poll

The 1954–55 UCLA Bruins men's basketball team represented the University of California, Los Angeles during the 1954–55 NCAA men's basketball season and were members of the Pacific Coast Conference. The Bruins were led by seventh year head coach John Wooden. They finished the regular season with a record of 21–5 and won the PCC Southern Division with a record of 11–1. UCLA lost to Oregon State in the PCC conference play-offs.

== Previous season ==
The Bruins finished the regular season with a record of 18–7 and finished 2nd in the PCC Southern Division with a record of 7–5.

== Roster ==
1954–55 UCLA Bruins men's basketball team
Players
Coaches

Pos.	#	Name	Height	Weight	Year	Hometown
F	55	Carroll Adams	6 ft 1 in (1.85 m)	—	Jr
F	78	Bob Ballard	6 ft 2 in (1.88 m)	—
F	57	Ron Bane	6 ft 2 in (1.88 m)	—	Sr
G	56	Don Bragg (C)	6 ft 4 in (1.93 m)	—	Sr
F		Mark Costello	6 ft 2 in (1.88 m)	—	Sr	El Monte, California
G	25	Dave Hall	—	—
F	53	Allen Herring	—	—	Jr
G	23	Lindy Kell	5 ft 10 in (1.78 m)	—
F	32	John Moore (C)	6 ft 5 in (1.96 m)	—	Sr
C	33	Willie Naulls	6 ft 5 in (1.96 m)	—	Jr	Dallas, Texas
G	22	Morris Taft	6 ft 2 in (1.88 m)	—	Jr
G	76	Ed White	6 ft 2 in (1.88 m)	—

Head coach

John Wooden (Purdue)

Assistant coach(es)

- Eddie Powell
- Alan Sawyer (UCLA)

Legend

- (C) Team captain
- (S) Suspended
- (I) Ineligible
- (W) Walk-on
- Injured
- Current redshirt

Roster
Last update: 30 January 2018

== Schedule ==
Date time, TV	Rank^{#}	Opponent^{#}	Result	Record	Site city, state
Regular Season
December 4, 1954*		Kansas State	W 86–57	1–0	Men's Gym; Los Angeles, CA
December 10, 1954*	No. 13	Santa Clara	W 74–39	2–0	Men's Gym; Los Angeles, CA
December 11, 1954*	No. 13	San Francisco	W 47–40	3–0	Men's Gym; Los Angeles, CA
December 17, 1954*	No. 8	at Santa Clara	W 65–58	4–0	San Jose Civic Auditorium; San Jose, CA
December 18, 1954*	No. 8	at San Francisco	L 44–56	4–1	Cow Palace; San Francisco, CA
December 21, 1954*	No. 17	Colorado	W 65–62	5–1	Men's Gym; Los Angeles, CA
December 22, 1954*	No. 17	New Mexico	W 106–41	6–1	Men's Gym; Los Angeles, CA
December 27, 1954*	No. 17	vs. No. 10 Niagara; ECAC Holiday Festival	W 88–86	7–1	Madison Square Garden; New York, NY
December 29, 1954*	No. 15	vs. No. 3 La Salle; ECAC Holiday Festival	L 77–85	7–2	Madison Square Garden; New York, NY
December 31, 1954*	No. 15	vs. No. 4 Dayton; ECAC Holiday Festival	W 104–92	8–2	Madison Square Garden; New York, NY
January 7, 1955	No. 7	at Stanford	L 56–61	8–3 (0–1)	Stanford Pavilion; Stanford, CA
January 8, 1955	No. 7	Stanford	W 91–75	9–3 (1–1)	Stanford Pavilion; Stanford, CA
January 14, 1955	No. 10	No. 18 USC	W 70–67	10–3 (2–1)	Men's Gym; Los Angeles, CA
January 15, 1955*	No. 10	No. 18 USC	W 76–64	11–3 (3–1)	Men's Gym; Los Angeles, CA
January 28, 1955*	No. 9	UC Santa Barbara	W 91–62	12–3 (3–1)	Men's Gym; Los Angeles, CA
January 29, 1955*	No. 9	Cal Poly	W 84–55	13–3 (5–1)	Men's Gym; Los Angeles, CA
February 4, 1955	No. 8	California	W 83–64	14–3 (6–1)	Men's Gym; Los Angeles, CA
February 5, 1955	No. 8	California	W 84–63	15–3 (7–1)	Men's Gym; Los Angeles, CA
February 11, 1955	No. 8	Stanford	W 72–59	16–3 (8–1)	Men's Gym; Los Angeles, CA
February 12, 1955	No. 8	Stanford	W 72–59	17–3 (9–1)	Men's Gym; Los Angeles, CA
February 18, 1954	No. 9	at California	W 55–48	18–3 (10–3)	Men's Gym; Berkeley, CA
February 19, 1955	No. 9	at California	W 84–76	19–3 (11–3)	Men's Gym; Berkeley, CA
February 25, 1955	No. 9	at USC	W 66–65	20–3 (12–3)	Long Beach Arena; Long Beach, CA
February 26, 1955	No. 9	at USC	W 75–55	21–3 (13–3)	Long Beach Arena; Long Beach, CA
Conference Championship Play-offs
March 4, 1955	No. 9	at No. 14 Oregon State; PCC Championship play-offs	L 75–82	21–4	Oregon State Coliseum; Corvallis, OR
March 5, 1955	No. 9	at No. 14 Oregon State; PCC Championship play-offs	L 64–83	21–5	Oregon State Coliseum; Corvallis, OR
*Non-conference game. ^{#}Rankings from AP Poll. (#) Tournament seedings in parentheses. All times are in Pacific Time.
