= 1954–55 Kansas Jayhawks men's basketball team =

American college basketball season

1954–55 Kansas Jayhawks men's basketball
- Conference: Big Eight Conference|Big Seven Conference
- Record: 11–10 (5–7 Big 7)
- Head coach: Phog Allen (38th season)
- Assistant coaches: Jack Eskridge (1st season); Dick Harp (6th season)
- Captain: John Anderson
- Home arena: Hoch Auditorium; Allen Fieldhouse

1954–55 Big Seven Conference men's basketball standings
	Conf.				Overall
Team	W		L	PCT	W		L	PCT
No. 15 Colorado	11	–	1	.917	19	–	6	.760
Missouri	9	–	3	.750	16	–	5	.762
Kansas State	6	–	6	.500	11	–	10	.524
Nebraska	6	–	6	.500	9	–	12	.429
Kansas	5	–	7	.417	11	–	10	.524
Iowa State	4	–	8	.333	11	–	10	.524
Oklahoma	1	–	11	.083	3	–	18	.143
Rankings from AP Poll

The 1954–55 Kansas Jayhawks men's basketball team represented the University of Kansas during the 1954–55 college men's basketball season. The Jayhawks were coached by Phog Allen who in his 36th season of his second tenure, 38th season overall. Kansas played their home games primarily at Hoch Auditorium, however, they did play their first game at Allen Fieldhouse, named after their head coach, on March 1, 1955 against Kansas State. They would play one more game at Allen Fieldhouse that season. The Jayhawks finished 11–10 and failed to qualify for the NCAA tournament.

== Roster ==
- Dallas Dobbs
- Gene Elstun
- Bill Brainard
- Lew Johnson
- John Parker
- John Anderson
- Maurice King
- Gary Padgett
- Larry Davenport
- Blaine Hollinger
- Chris Divich
- Ron Johnston
- Lee Green
- Harry Jett
- Jack Wolfe
- Jerry Alberts
- Jim Toft
- Bill Heitholt
- Dick Warren
- Allan Hurst

== Schedule ==
Date time, TV	Rank^{#}	Opponent^{#}	Result	Record	Site city, state
December 6*		LSU	W 83–58	1-0	Hoch Auditorium; Lawrence, KS
December 14*		Tulsa	W 73–66	2-0	Hoch Auditorium; Lawrence, KS
December 17*		Rice	W 77–67	3-0	Hoch Auditorium; Lawrence, KS
December 18*		Rice	W 100–72	4-0	Hoch Auditorium; Lawrence, KS
December 27	No. 20	vs. Iowa State	L 81–82	4-1	Municipal Auditorium; Kansas City, MO
December 29*	No. 16	vs. California	L 62–65	4-2	Municipal Auditorium; Kansas City, MO
December 31	No. 16	vs. Nebraska	W 69–66	5-2	Municipal Auditorium; Kansas City, MO
January 4		No. 9 Missouri; Border War	L 65–76	5-3 (0-1)	Hoch Auditorium; Lawrence, KS
January 10		Colorado	L 54–65	5-4 (0-2)	Hoch Auditorium; Lawrence, KS
January 15		at Nebraska	L 55–66	5-5 (0-3)	Nebraska Coliseum; Lincoln, NE
January 17		at Iowa State	W 73–72	6-5 (1-3)	The Armory; Ames IA
February 8		Iowa State	L 59–77	6-6 (1-4)	Hoch Auditorium; Lawrence, KS
February 12		at Kansas State; Sunflower Showdown	W 78–68	7-6 (2-4)	Ahearn Field House; Manhattan, KS
February 14		Oklahoma A&M	W 50–42	8-6	Hoch Auditorium; Lawrence, KS
February 16		at Oklahoma	W 87–75	9-6 (3-4)	Field House; Norman, OK
February 19		Nebraska	L 55–66	9-7 (3-5)	Hoch Auditorium; Lawrence, KS
February 22		Colorado	L 69–80	9-8 (3-6)	Balch Fieldhouse; Boulder, CO
February 27		at Oklahoma A&M	L 49–63	9-9	Gallagher-Iba Arena; Stillwater, Oklahoma
March 1		Kansas State; Sunflower Showdown	W 77–67	10-9 (4-6)	Allen Fieldhouse; Lawrence, KS
March 5		at No. 20 Missouri; Border War	L 71–90	10-10 (4-7)	Brewer Fieldhouse; Columbia, MO
March 8		Oklahoma	W 71–67	11-10 (5-7)	Allen Fieldhouse; Lawrence, KS
*Non-conference game. ^{#}Rankings from AP Poll. (#) Tournament seedings in parentheses.
