= 1954–55 Colorado Buffaloes men's basketball team =

American college basketball season

1954–55 Colorado Buffaloes men's basketball

Big 7 Conference champion

NCAA tournament, Final Four
- Conference: Big 7 Conference

Ranking
- Coaches: No. 11
- AP: No. 15
- Record: 19–6 (11–1 Big 7)
- Head coach: Bebe Lee (5th season)
- Home arena: Balch Fieldhouse

1954–55 Big Seven Conference men's basketball standings
	Conf.				Overall
Team	W		L	PCT	W		L	PCT
No. 15 Colorado	11	–	1	.917	19	–	6	.760
Missouri	9	–	3	.750	16	–	5	.762
Kansas State	6	–	6	.500	11	–	10	.524
Nebraska	6	–	6	.500	9	–	12	.429
Kansas	5	–	7	.417	11	–	10	.524
Iowa State	4	–	8	.333	11	–	10	.524
Oklahoma	1	–	11	.083	3	–	18	.143
Rankings from AP Poll

The 1954–55 Colorado Buffaloes Men's basketball team represented the University of Colorado in the 1954–55 NCAA men's basketball season. Led by fifth-year head coach Bebe Lee, the Buffaloes were Big Seven Conference champions and made a run to the Final Four of the NCAA tournament. In the National semifinals, Colorado lost to Bill Russell and San Francisco by a respectable 62–50 margin. The Buffaloes bounced back in the consolation game to defeat Iowa to finish the season with a 19–6 record (11–1 Big Seven).

== Roster ==
1954–55 Colorado Buffaloes men's basketball team
Players
Coaches

Pos.	#	Name	Height	Weight	Year	Previous school	Hometown
C	22	Burdette Haldorson	6 ft 9 in (2.06 m)	220 lb (100 kg)	Sr	Austin HS	Austin, Minnesota
F		Robert Jeangerard	6 ft 3 in (1.91 m)	190 lb (86 kg)	Sr	New Trier HS	Winnetka, Illinois

Head coach

Bebe Lee

Assistant coach(es)

Legend

- (C) Team captain
- (S) Suspended
- (I) Ineligible
- (W) Walk-on
- Injured
- Current redshirt

== Schedule and results ==
Date time, TV	Rank^{#}	Opponent^{#}	Result	Record	Site city, state
Non-conference regular season
Dec 4, 1954*		Brigham Young	W 88–66	1–0	Balch Fieldhouse; Boulder, Colorado
Dec 5, 1954*		Brigham Young	W 65–46	2–0	Balch Fieldhouse; Boulder, Colorado
Dec 11, 1954*		Colorado State	W 66–47	3–0	Balch Fieldhouse; Boulder, Colorado
Dec 17, 1954*		at California	L 44–57	3–1	Men's Gym; Berkeley, California
Dec 18, 1954*		at California	L 46–59	3–2	Men's Gym; Berkeley, California
Dec 21, 1954*		at No. 17 UCLA	L 62–65	3–3	Men's Gym; Los Angeles, California
Dec 27, 1954*		vs. Oklahoma; Big Seven Holiday Tournament	L 71–73 ^{OT}	3–4	Municipal Auditorium; Kansas City, Missouri
Dec 29, 1954*		vs. Nebraska; Big Seven Holiday Tournament	W 89–47	4–4	Municipal Auditorium; Kansas City, Missouri
Dec 30, 1954*		vs. California; Big Seven Holiday Tournament	W 69–60	5–4	Municipal Auditorium; Kansas City, Missouri
Big 7 Regular season
Jan 8, 1955		at Oklahoma	W 61–55	6–4 (1–0)	McCasland Field House; Norman, Oklahoma
Jan 10, 1955		at Kansas	W 65–54	7–4 (2–0)	Hoch Auditorium; Lawrence, Kansas
Jan 17, 1955		Oklahoma	W 91–82	8–4 (3–0)	Balch Fieldhouse; Boulder, Colorado
Jan 24, 1955		Iowa State	W 78–71	9–4 (4–0)	Balch Fieldhouse; Boulder, Colorado
Feb 5, 1955		at Iowa State	W 86–70	10–4 (5–0)	Iowa State Armory; Ames, Iowa
Feb 7, 1955		at Nebraska	L 77–84	10–5 (5–1)	Nebraska Coliseum; Lincoln, Nebraska
Feb 12, 1955		No. 14 Missouri	W 80–71	11–5 (6–1)	Balch Fieldhouse; Boulder, Colorado
Feb 19, 1955		Kansas State	W 61–53	12–5 (7–1)	Balch Fieldhouse; Boulder, Colorado
Feb 22, 1955		Kansas	W 80–69	13–5 (8–1)	Balch Fieldhouse; Boulder, Colorado
Feb 26, 1955		at Kansas State	W 63–60	14–5 (9–1)	Ahearn Field House; Manhattan, Kansas
Feb 28, 1955		at No. 20 Missouri	W 66–57	15–5 (10–1)	Brewer Fieldhouse; Columbia, Missouri
Mar 5, 1955		Nebraska	W 77–66	16–5 (11–1)	Balch Fieldhouse; Boulder, Colorado
NCAA Tournament
Mar 11, 1955*	No. 15	vs. No. 16 Tulsa; Midwest Regional semifinal	W 69–59	17–5	Ahearn Field House; Manhattan, Kansas
Mar 12, 1955*	No. 15	vs. Bradley; Midwest Regional final	W 93–81	18–5	Ahearn Field House; Manhattan, Kansas
Mar 18, 1955*	No. 15	vs. No. 1 San Francisco; National semifinal – Final Four	L 50–62	18–6	Municipal Auditorium; Kansas City, Missouri
Mar 19, 1955*	No. 15	vs. No. 5 Iowa; Consolation	W 75–54	19–6	Municipal Auditorium; Kansas City, Missouri
*Non-conference game. ^{#}Rankings from AP Poll. (#) Tournament seedings in parentheses. E=East. All times are in Mountain Time.

== NBA draft ==
Round	Pick	Player	NBA Club
4	23	Burdette Haldorson	St. Louis Hawks
