= 1966–67 Connecticut Huskies men's basketball team =

American college basketball season

1966–67 Connecticut Huskies men's basketball

Yankee Conference Regular Season Champions

NCAA University Division Tournament, First Round
- Conference: Yankee Conference
- Record: 17–7 (9–1 YC)
- Head coach: Fred Shabel (4th season)
- Assistant coach: Burr Carlson
- Home arena: Hugh S. Greer Field House

1966–67 Yankee Conference men's basketball standings
| | Conf. | | | | Overall |
| Team | W | | L | PCT | W | | L | PCT |
|---|---|---|---|---|---|---|---|---|
| Connecticut | 9 | – | 1 | .900 | 17 | – | 7 | .708 |
| Rhode Island | 8 | – | 2 | .800 | 14 | – | 12 | .538 |
| Massachusetts | 7 | – | 3 | .700 | 11 | – | 14 | .440 |
| New Hampshire | 4 | – | 6 | .400 | 10 | – | 12 | .455 |
| Maine | 1 | – | 9 | .100 | 8 | – | 12 | .400 |
| Vermont | 1 | – | 9 | .100 | 9 | – | 15 | .375 |

The 1966–67 Connecticut Huskies men's basketball team represented the University of Connecticut in the 1966–67 collegiate men's basketball season. The Huskies completed the season with a 17–7 overall record. The Huskies were members of the Yankee Conference, where they ended the season with a 9–1 record. They were the Yankee Conference Regular Season Champions and made it to the first round in the 1967 NCAA Division I men's basketball tournament. The Huskies played their home games at Hugh S. Greer Field House in Storrs, Connecticut, and were led by fourth-year head coach Fred Shabel.

== Schedule ==
| Date time, TV | Rank^{#} | Opponent^{#} | Result | Record | Site (attendance) city, state |
Regular Season
| 12/1/1966* | | American International | W 81–58 | 1–0 | Hugh S. Greer Field House; Storrs, CT |
| 12/3/1966* | | at Yale | L 57–65 | 1–1 | Payne Whitney Gymnasium; New Haven, CT |
| 12/7/1966 | | at New Hampshire | W 77–56 | 2–1 (1–0) | Lundholm Gym; Durham, NH |
| 12/10/1966* | | at Boston College | L 69–87 | 2–2 | Roberts Center; Boston, MA |
| 12/14/1966* | | St. Francis (NY) | W 85–61 | 3–2 | Hugh S. Greer Field House; Storrs, CT |
| 12/17/1966* | | East Carolina | W 89–60 | 4–2 | Hugh S. Greer Field House; Storrs, CT |
| 12/28/1966* | | George Washington; Basketball Classic | W 89–69 | 5–2 | Hugh S. Greer Field House; Storrs, CT |
| 12/30/1966* | | Virginia; Basketball Classic | W 100–79 | 6–2 | Hugh S. Greer Field House; Storrs, CT |
| 1/4/1967* | | Holy Cross | L 69–74 ^{OT} | 6–3 | Hugh S. Greer Field House; Storrs, CT |
| 1/7/1967 | | at Vermont | W 58–49 | 7–3 (2–0) | Patrick Gym; Burlington, VT |
| 1/14/1967 | | Rhode Island | W 80–78 | 8–3 (3–0) | Hugh S. Greer Field House; Storrs, CT |
| 1/16/1967 | | Vermont | W 99–70 | 9–3 (4–0) | Hugh S. Greer Field House; Storrs, CT |
| 1/21/1967* | | Fordham | W 67–66 | 10–3 | Hugh S. Greer Field House; Storrs, CT |
| 2/1/1967 | | Massachusetts | W 66–59 | 11–3 (5–0) | Hugh S. Greer Field House; Storrs, CT |
| 2/4/1967 | | Maine | W 109–65 | 12–3 (6–0) | Hugh S. Greer Field House; Storrs, CT |
| 2/6/1967* | | Syracuse; Rivalry | L 79–90 | 12–4 | Hugh S. Greer Field House; Storrs, CT |
| 2/11/1967* | | Boston University | W 113–64 | 13–4 | Hugh S. Greer Field House; Storrs, CT |
| 2/13/1967 | | at Maine | W 114–88 | 14–4 (7–0) | Memorial Gymnasium; Orono, ME |
| 2/18/1967 | | at Massachusetts | W 60–59 | 15–4 (8–0) | Curry Hicks Cage; Amherst, MA |
| 2/21/1967 | | New Hampshire | W 114–75 | 16–4 (9–0) | Hugh S. Greer Field House; Storrs, CT |
| 2/23/1967* | | Rutgers | W 84–77 | 17–4 | Hugh S. Greer Field House; Storrs, CT |
| 2/25/1967 | | at Rhode Island | L 86–87 | 17–5 (9–1) | Keaney Gymnasium; Kingston, RI |
| 3/1/1967* | | at Holy Cross | L 61–70 | 17–6 | Worcester, MA |
NCAA Tournament
| 3/11/1967* | | vs. Boston College; First Round | L 42–48 | 17–7 | Kingston, RI |
*Non-conference game. ^{#}Rankings from AP Poll. (#) Tournament seedings in parentheses. All times are in Eastern Time.

Schedule Source:
