= 1954–55 Iowa Hawkeyes men's basketball team =

American college basketball season

1954–55 Iowa Hawkeyes men's basketball
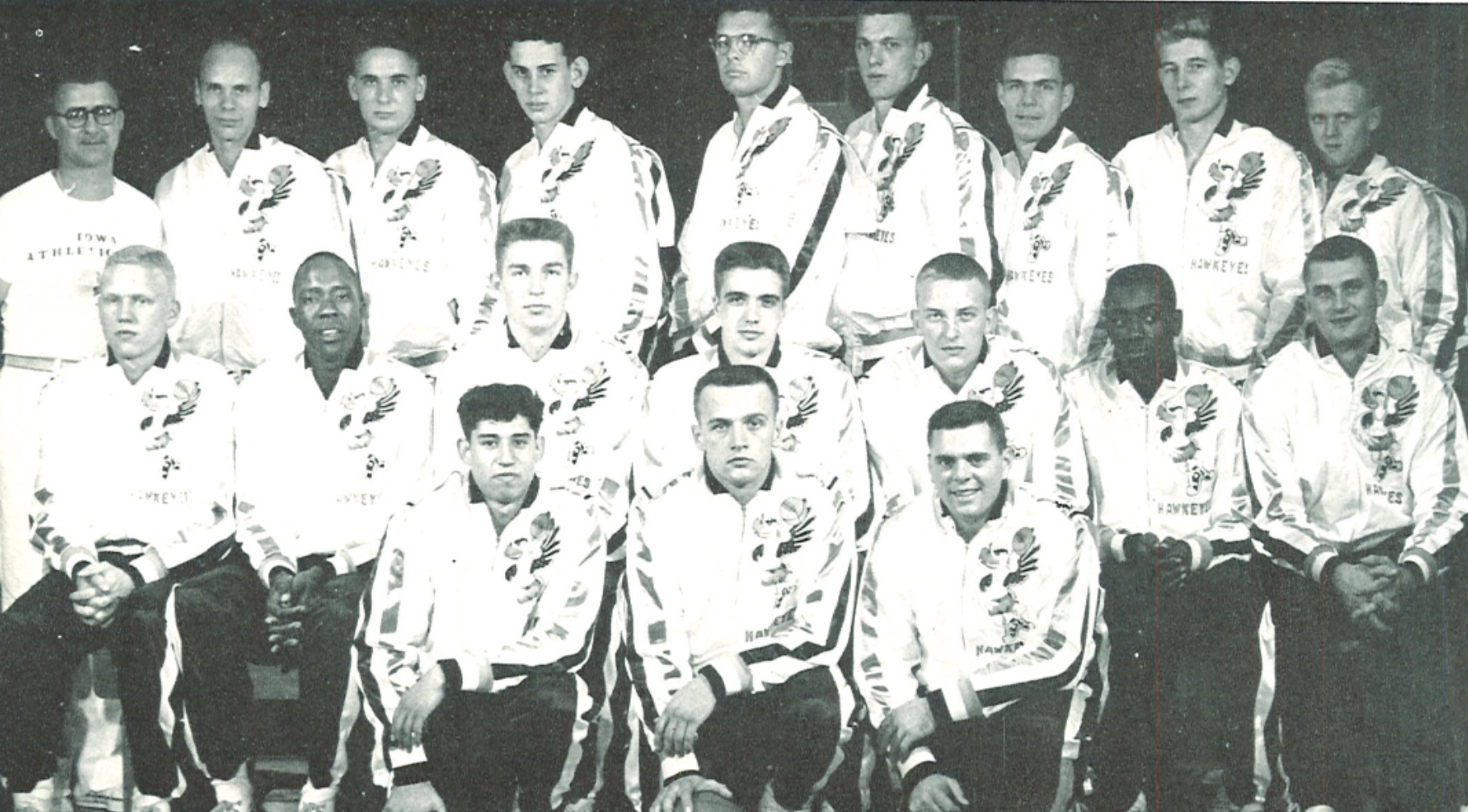

Big Ten Champions

NCAA men's Division I tournament, Final Four
- Conference: Big Ten Conference

Ranking
- Coaches: No. 5
- AP: No. 5
- Record: 19–7 (11–3 Big Ten)
- Head coach: Bucky O'Connor
- MVP: Bill Seaberg
- Home arena: Iowa Field House

1954–55 Big Ten Conference men's basketball standings
	Conf.				Overall
Team	W		L	PCT	W		L	PCT
No. 5 Iowa	11	–	3	.786	19	–	7	.731
No. 18 Illinois	10	–	4	.714	17	–	5	.773
No. 11 Minnesota	10	–	4	.714	15	–	7	.682
Michigan State	8	–	6	.571	13	–	9	.591
Northwestern	7	–	7	.500	12	–	10	.545
Purdue	5	–	9	.357	12	–	10	.545
Michigan	5	–	9	.357	11	–	11	.500
Wisconsin	5	–	9	.357	10	–	12	.455
Indiana	5	–	9	.357	8	–	14	.364
Ohio State	4	–	10	.286	10	–	12	.455
Rankings from AP Poll

The 1954–55 Iowa Hawkeyes men's basketball team represented the University of Iowa in intercollegiate basketball during the 1954–55 season. The team finished the season with a 19–7 record (11-3 in Big Ten), won the Big Ten title, and made the school's first trip to the Final Four.

== Roster ==
The group of juniors on this team – Sharm Scheuerman, Bill Logan, Carl Cain, Bill Seaberg and Bill Schoof – are known to Hawkeye fans as the "Fabulous Five."

1954–55 Iowa Hawkeyes men's basketball team
Players
Coaches

Pos.	#	Name	Height	Weight	Year	Previous school	Hometown
		Henry Berry	—	—	Jr	–	Chicago, IL
F	21	Carl Cain	6 ft 3 in (1.91 m)	—	Jr	Freeport High School	Freeport, IL
		Tom Choules	—	—	Jr	–	Idaho Falls, ID
		Carter Crookham	—	—	So	–	Oskaloosa, IA
F	16	McKinley Davis	6 ft 2 in (1.88 m)	—	Sr	–	Freeport, IL
C		Douglas Duncan	—	—	Sr	–	Salt Lake City, UT
F/C	35	Bob George	—	—	Jr	–	Deerfield, IL
G		Lester Hawthorne	—	—	Jr	–	Saybrook, IL
G	23	Roy Johnson	—	—	Jr	–	Homewood, IL
		John Liston	—	—	So	–	Knoxville, IL
C	31	Bill Logan	6 ft 6 in (1.98 m)	—	Jr	–	Keokuk, IA
G	24	Augie Martel	5 ft 10 in (1.78 m)	—	So	–	Moline, IL
		Jerry Reichow	—	—	Jr	–	Decorah, IA
F		Jerry Ridley	—	—	Jr	–	Riverside, IL
		Richard Ritter	—	—	Jr	–	Grinnell, IA
G	46	Sharm Scheuerman	6 ft 2 in (1.88 m)	—	Jr	Rock Island High School	Moline, IL
F	33	Bill Schoof	6 ft 6 in (1.98 m)	—	Jr	–	Homewood, IL
G	22	Bill Seaberg	6 ft 2 in (1.88 m)	—	Jr	–	Moline, IL
		Frank Sebolt	—	—	So	–	Davenport, IA

Head coach

- Bucky O'Connor (Drake)

Assistant coach(es)

Legend

- (C) Team captain
- (S) Suspended
- (I) Ineligible
- (W) Walk-on
- Injured
- Current redshirt

Roster

== Schedule/results ==
Date time, TV	Rank^{#}	Opponent^{#}	Result	Record	Site (attendance) city, state
Non-conference
12/1/1954*		Washington (MO)	W 80–61	1–0	Iowa Field House; Iowa City, IA
12/4/1954*		at Loyola (IL)	W 89–79	2–0	Alumni Gym; Chicago, IL
12/6/1954*	No. 4	Nebraska; Rivalry	W 84-61	3-0	Iowa Field House; Iowa City, IA
12/11/1954*	No. 4	at Missouri	L 94–97	3–1	Brewer Fieldhouse; Columbia, MO
12/13/1954*	No. 13	Saint Mary's (CA)	W 68–49	4–1	Iowa Field House; Iowa City, IA
12/17/1954*	No. 13	at Pennsylvania	L 75–87	4–2	The Palestra; Philadelphia, PA
12/18/1954*	No. 18	vs. Princeton	W 71–52	5–2	The Palestra; Philadelphia, PA
12/30/1954*	No. 19	Stanford	W 73–46	6–2	Iowa Field House; Iowa City, IA
Conference
1/3/1955	No. 14	at Wisconsin	W 86–69	7–2 (1–0)	Wisconsin Field House; Madison, WI
1/8/1955	No. 14	No. 13 Minnesota	L 80–81	7–3 (1–1)	Iowa Field House; Iowa City, IA
1/10/1955	No. 19	Michigan State	W 94–81	8–3 (2–1)	Iowa Field House; Iowa City, IA
1/17/1955	No. 19	No. 7 Illinois	W 92–80	9–3 (3–1)	Iowa Field House; Iowa City, IA
1/22/1955	No. 19	at Northwestern	L 73–93	9–4 (3–2)	McGaw Hall; Evanston, IL
1/24/1955	No. 19	at Ohio State	W 79–66	10–4 (4–2)	Ohio Expo Center Coliseum; Columbus, OH
2/5/1954		Purdue	W 76–67	11–4 (5–2)	Iowa Field House; Iowa City, IA
2/12/1955	No. 15	Indiana	W 90–75	12–4 (6–2)	Iowa Field House; Iowa City, IA
2/14/1955	No. 15	Ohio State	W 79–68	13–4 (7–2)	Iowa Field House; Iowa City, IA
2/19/1955	No. 15	at Michigan State	W 78–69	14–4 (8–2)	Jenison Fieldhouse; East Lansing, MI
2/21/1955	No. 16	No. 13 Illinois	W 89–70	15–4 (9–2)	Huff Hall; Champaign, IL
2/26/1955	No. 16	Michigan	W 96–84	16–4 (10–2)	Iowa Field House; Iowa City, IA
2/28/1955	No. 12	at No. 6 Minnesota	W 72–70	17–4 (11–2)	Williams Arena; Minneapolis, MN
3/7/1955	No. 12	at Michigan	L 58–74	17–5 (11–3)	Yost Field House; Ann Arbor, MI
NCAA tournament
3/11/1955*	No. 5	vs. Penn State; Regional semifinal	W 82–53	18–5	McGaw Hall; Evanston, IL
3/12/1955*	No. 5	vs. No. 4 Marquette; Regional Final	W 86–81	19–5	McGaw Hall; Evanston, IL
3/18/1955*	No. 5	vs. No. 3 La Salle; National semifinal	L 73–76	19–6	Municipal Auditorium; Kansas City, MO
3/19/1955*	No. 5	vs. No. 15 Colorado; National third-place game	L 54–75	19–7	Municipal Auditorium; Kansas City, MO
*Non-conference game. ^{#}Rankings from AP Poll. (#) Tournament seedings in parentheses.

== Awards and honors ==
- Carl Cain – Honorable Mention AP All-American
