= George Davidson (basketball) =

American basketball coach and player

Personal information
- Born: October 17, 1925 Philadelphia, Pennsylvania, U.S.
- Died: March 5, 2017 (aged 91) Murrells Inlet, South Carolina, U.S.
- Listed height: 6 ft 1 in (1.85 m)
- Listed weight: 175 lb (79 kg)

Career information
- College: Lafayette (1948–1951)
- NBA draft: 1951: 8th round, 77th overall pick
- Drafted by: Rochester Royals
- Playing career: 1951–1952
- Position: Guard

Career history

Playing
- 1951–1952: Reading Merchants
- 1952: Lancaster Rockets

Coaching
- 1955–1967: Lafayette
- Stats at Basketball Reference

George E. Davidson (October 17, 1925 – March 5, 2017) was an American basketball coach and professional player. He played college basketball for the Lafayette Leopards from 1948 to 1951. After a brief professional career, Davidson returned to serve as head coach of Lafayette from 1955 to 1967.

== Playing career ==
Davidson served as the captain of the Leopards basketball team during his senior season. He set team records in single-season scoring with 473 points and a single-game performance with 34 points. Davidson's points were ranked 13th highest in the nation.

Davidson was selected in the 1951 NBA draft by the Rochester Royals but chose to sign with the Reading Merchants of the Eastern Professional Basketball League (EPBL). He split the 1951–52 season in the EPBL with the Merchants and the Lancaster Rockets. Davidson averaged 9.7 points per game in 17 games played.

== Coaching career ==
Davidson began his coaching career at the Pennsylvania Military Preparatory School and Germantown Academy. He returned to Lafayette and replaced Butch van Breda Kolff to become the youngest head coach in the basketball team's history at the age of 28. Davidson's 1956–57 team accumulated a 22–5 record and secured the team's first appearance in the NCAA Division I men's basketball tournament. His Lafayette teams compiled a 170–116 record during his 12-year tenure.

Davidson spent more than 20 years as an assistant athletic director for Lafayette where he was responsible for ticketing and business affairs. He also coached the college's golf team.

Davidson was inducted into the Lafayette Maroon Club Hall of Fame for its 1977–78 class.
