= Bulkeley School =

- U.S. National Register of Historic Places
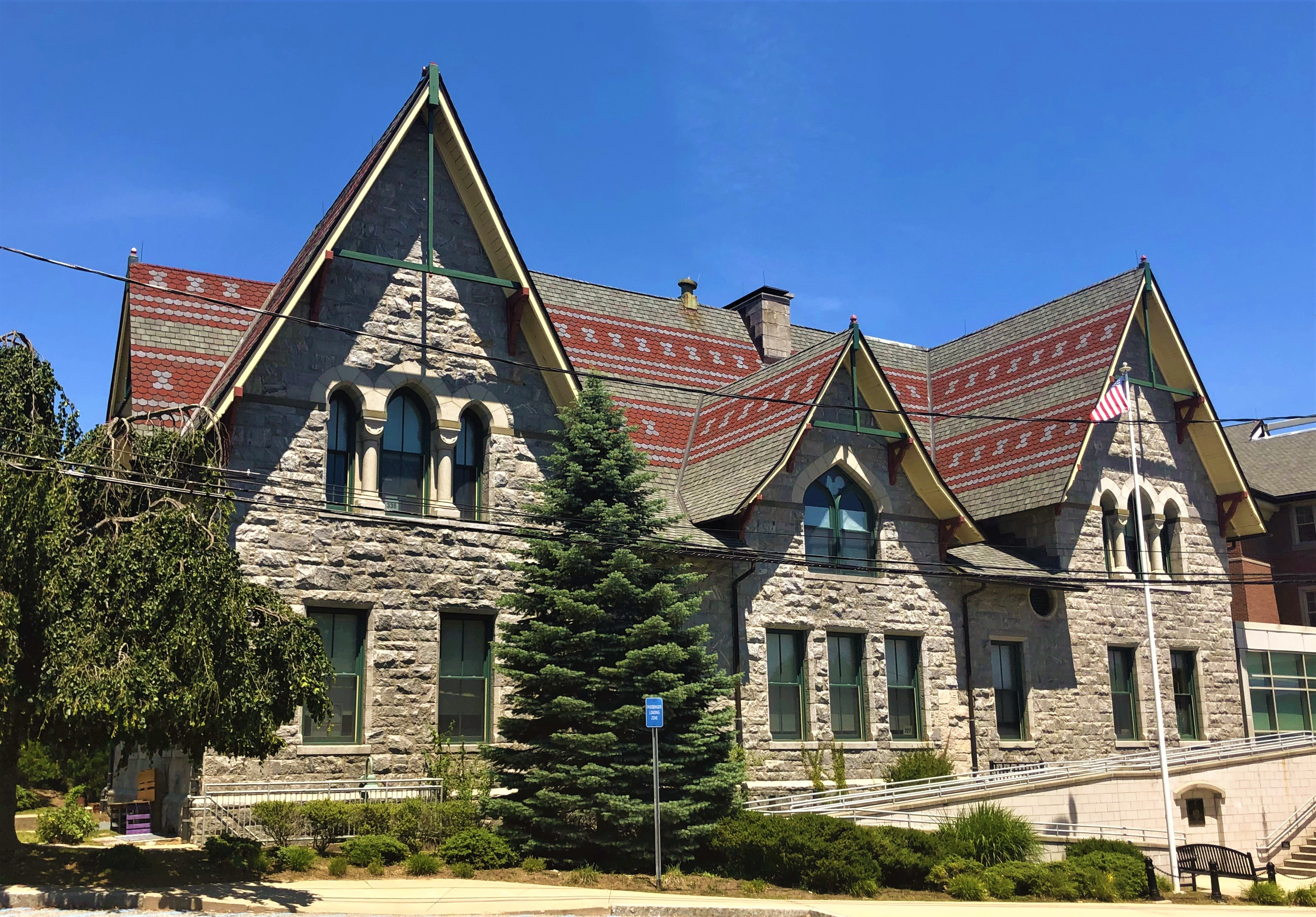
- (2022)

- Location within Connecticut Location within the United States
- Location: 1 Bulkeley Place, New London, Connecticut
- Coordinates: 41°21′31″N 72°6′3″W
- Area: 1.4 acres (0.57 ha)
- Built: 1871
- Architect: Eidlitz, Leopold; Multiple
- Architectural style: Gothic
- NRHP reference No.: 81000613
- Added to NRHP: August 13, 1981

The Bulkeley School is a historic school building at 1 Bulkeley Place at the intersection of Hempstead Street in New London, Connecticut. It is a High Victorian Gothic stone structure, built in 1871–73 to a design by Leopold Eidlitz, with numerous additions. It was a private boys high school until 1951, educating generations of city leaders.

The building was listed the National Register of Historic Places on August 13, 1981, for its architecture and its role in the city's development. It is now home to the Regional Multicultural Magnet School (RMMS), grades K-5.

== Description and history ==
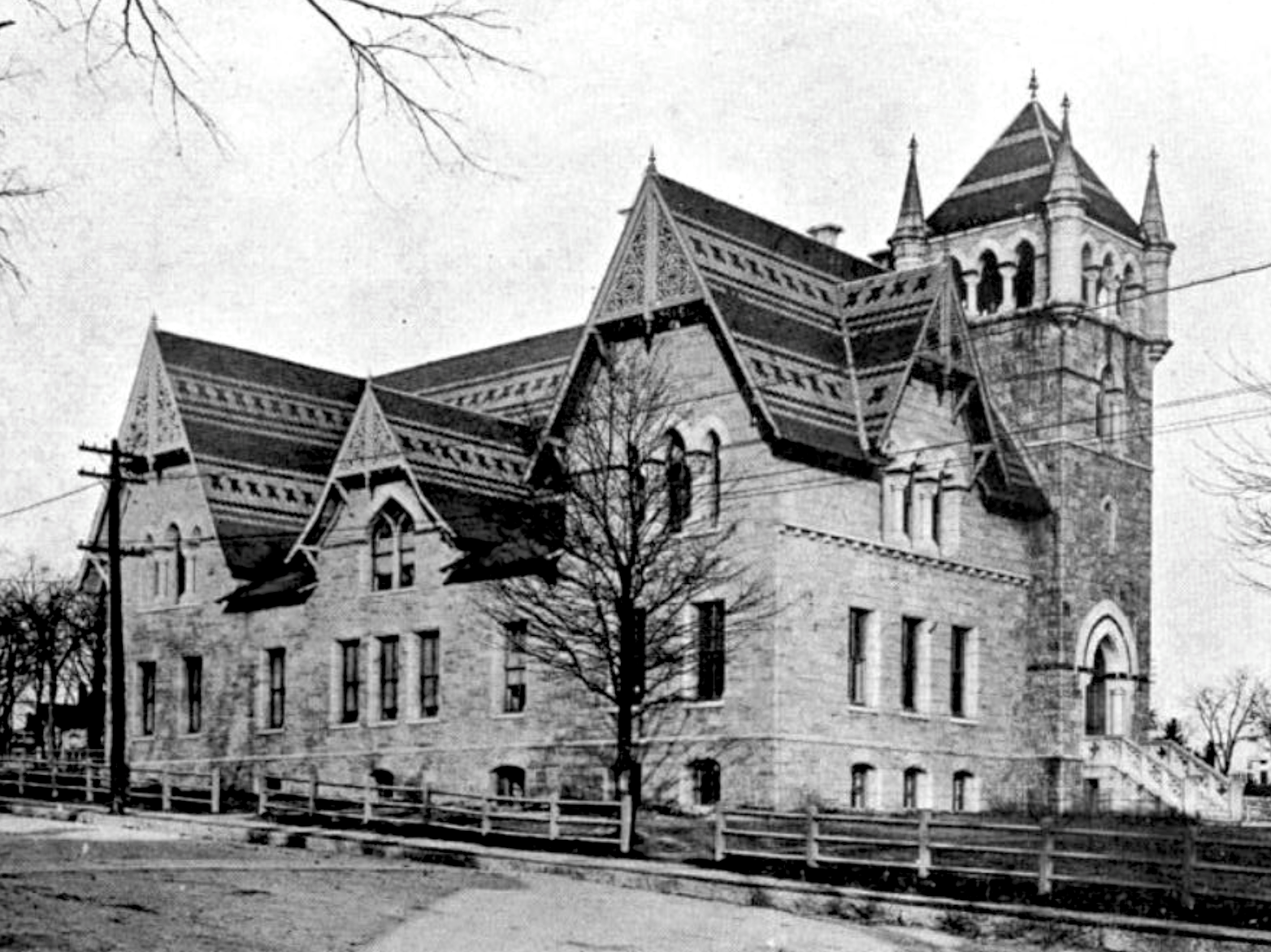
The school c.1913

The Bulkeley School building is located a short way north of Downtown New London on a lot bounded by Huntington Street, Bulkeley Place, Hempstead Street, and Ye Antientist Burial Ground. The western portion of the building is the oldest section, with a larger modern brick structure to the east overlooking Huntington Street. The older section is built out of granite, and is 2 1/2 stories in height with High Victorian Gothic styling. It has steeply pitched gable roofs covered in multicolored slate, with Gothic arched windows in the large flanking gables, the sections separated by pillars. A central gable is lower, with a single Gothic window at its center.

The main building design was by Leopold Eidlitz, a prominent New York City architect, and it was completed in 1873. The Bulkeley School was founded under a bequest from local merchant Leonard H. Bulkeley for the establishment of a private boys secondary school. It was open at no cost to New London students, who had to pass an exam to gain admission. In 1891, the school began accepting tuition-paying out-of-town students, and its success prompted several rounds of expansion. It continued to operate as a private school until 1951, when it was merged into New London's public school system; it was later used to house town offices.

== See also ==
- National Register of Historic Places listings in New London County, Connecticut
