= 1954–55 Michigan Wolverines men's basketball team =

American college basketball season

1954–55 Michigan Wolverines men's basketball
- Conference: Big Ten Conference
- Record: 11–11 (5–9 Big Ten)
- Head coach: William Perigo
- Captain: Paul Groffsky
- Home arena: Yost Field House

1954–55 Big Ten Conference men's basketball standings
	Conf.				Overall
Team	W		L	PCT	W		L	PCT
No. 5 Iowa	11	–	3	.786	19	–	7	.731
No. 18 Illinois	10	–	4	.714	17	–	5	.773
No. 11 Minnesota	10	–	4	.714	15	–	7	.682
Michigan State	8	–	6	.571	13	–	9	.591
Northwestern	7	–	7	.500	12	–	10	.545
Purdue	5	–	9	.357	12	–	10	.545
Michigan	5	–	9	.357	11	–	11	.500
Wisconsin	5	–	9	.357	10	–	12	.455
Indiana	5	–	9	.357	8	–	14	.364
Ohio State	4	–	10	.286	10	–	12	.455
Rankings from AP Poll

The 1954–55 Michigan Wolverines men's basketball team represented the University of Michigan in intercollegiate basketball during the 1954–55 season. The team finished the season in a tie for 6th place in the Big Ten Conference with an overall record of 11–11 and 5–9 against conference opponents.

William Perigo was in his third year as the team's head coach. Sophomore Ron Kramer was the team's leading scorer with 352 points in 22 games for an average of 16.0 points per game. Paul Groffsky was the team captain. Two members of the team went on to play as a professional in sports other than basketball. Kramer played in the National Football League, and Don Eaddy played Major League Baseball.

== Statistical leaders ==
Player	Pos.	Yr	G	FG	FT	RB	Pts	PPG
Ron Kramer		Soph.	22	133	86		352	16.0
Tom Jorgensen			22	121	91		333	15.1
Don Eaddy			22	132	63		327	14.9
Paul Groffsky			22	84	53		221	10.0
Harvey Williams			18	72	34		178	9.9
Jim Barron			8	27	47		101	12.6
Jim Shearon			20	29	27		85	4.3
Totals			22	642	436		1720	78.2

== Team players drafted into the NBA ==
One player from this team were selected in the NBA draft.

Year	Round	Pick	Overall	Player	NBA Club
1957	5	2	34	Ron Kramer	Detroit Pistons
