= 1967–68 Connecticut Huskies men's basketball team =

American college basketball season

1967–68 Connecticut Huskies men's basketball
- Conference: Yankee Conference
- Record: 11–13 (7–3 YC)
- Head coach: Burr Carlson (1st season)
- Assistant coach: Jack Coniam
- Home arena: Hugh S. Greer Field House

1967–68 Yankee Conference men's basketball standings
	Conf.				Overall
Team	W		L	PCT	W		L	PCT
Rhode Island	8	–	2	.800	15	–	11	.577
Massachusetts	8	–	2	.800	14	–	11	.560
Connecticut	7	–	3	.700	11	–	13	.458
Vermont	5	–	5	.500	12	–	12	.500
Maine	2	–	8	.200	7	–	17	.292
New Hampshire	0	–	10	.000	1	–	22	.043

The 1967–68 Connecticut Huskies men's basketball team represented the University of Connecticut in the 1967–68 collegiate men's basketball season. The Huskies completed the season with an 11–13 overall record. The Huskies were members of the Yankee Conference, where they ended the season with a 7–3 record. The Huskies played their home games at Hugh S. Greer Field House in Storrs, Connecticut, and were led by first-year head coach Burr Carlson.

== Schedule ==
Date time, TV	Rank^{#}	Opponent^{#}	Result	Record	Site (attendance) city, state
Regular Season
12/2/1967*		Yale	W 70–62	1–0	Hugh S. Greer Field House; Storrs, CT
12/5/1967*		at Boston University	L 72–79	1–1	Boston, MA
12/9/1967*		Boston College	L 60–76	1–2	Hugh S. Greer Field House; Storrs, CT
12/13/1967*		at St. Francis (NY)	L 62–82	1–3	69th Regiment Armory; New York, NY
12/16/1967*		at Fordham	L 48–57	1–4	Rose Hill Gymnasium; New York, NY
12/28/1967*		William & Mary; Basketball Classic	W 51–49	2–4	Hugh S. Greer Field House; Storrs, CT
12/29/1967*		Texas Christian; Basketball Classic	L 65–72	2–5	Hugh S. Greer Field House; Storrs, CT
1/3/1968*		at Holy Cross	L 77–83	2–6	Worcester, MA
1/6/1968		at Maine	W 81–79	3–6 (1–0)	Memorial Gymnasium; Orono, ME
1/10/1968		New Hampshire	W 96–70	4–6 (2–0)	Hugh S. Greer Field House; Storrs, CT
1/13/1968		at Rhode Island	L 65–78	4–7 (2–1)	Keaney Gymnasium; Kingston, RI
1/25/1968		at Vermont	W 87–59	5–7 (3–1)	Patrick Gym; Burlington, VT
1/27/1968*		at Syracuse; Rivalry	W 89–84	6–7	Manley Field House; Syracuse, NY
1/31/1968		at Massachusetts	L 63–65	6–8 (3–2)	Curry Hicks Cage; Amherst, MA
2/3/1968		Vermont	W 82–62	7–8 (4–2)	Hugh S. Greer Field House; Storrs, CT
2/10/1968		Maine	W 93–69	8–8 (5–2)	Hugh S. Greer Field House; Storrs, CT
2/13/1968*		at Rutgers	L 66–71	8–9	College Avenue Gymnasium; Newark, NJ
2/17/1968		Massachusetts	L 44–56	8–10 (5–3)	Hugh S. Greer Field House; Storrs, CT
2/20/1968		at New Hampshire	W 94–68	9–10 (6–3)	Lundholm Gym; Durham, NH
2/22/1968*		Holy Cross	L 85–86 ^{OT}	9–11	Hugh S. Greer Field House; Storrs, CT
2/24/1968*		Long Island	L 47–64	9–12	Hugh S. Greer Field House; Storrs, CT
2/26/1968*		Seton Hall	W 71–66	10–12	Hugh S. Greer Field House; Storrs, CT
2/29/1968*		vs. Manhattan	L 69–83	10–13	Madison Square Garden; New York, NY
3/2/1968		Rhode Island	W 62–58	11–13 (7–3)	Hugh S. Greer Field House; Storrs, CT
*Non-conference game. ^{#}Rankings from AP Poll. (#) Tournament seedings in parentheses. All times are in Eastern Time.

Schedule Source:
