= 1954–55 NCAA men's basketball rankings =

- Season: 1954–55
- NCAA Tournament: 1955
- Preseason No. 1: La Salle
- NCAA Tournament Champions: San Francisco
NCAA men's basketball rankings


The 1954–55 NCAA men's basketball rankings was made up of two human polls, the AP Poll and the Coaches Poll.

== Legend ==
	Increase in ranking
	Decrease in ranking
	New to rankings from previous week
Italics	Number of first place votes
(#–#)	Win–loss record
т	Tied with team above or below also with this symbol

== AP Poll ==
	Week 1 Dec. 7	Week 2 Dec. 14	Week 3 Dec. 21	Week 4 Dec. 28	Week 5 Jan. 4	Week 6 Jan. 11	Week 7 Jan. 18	Week 8 Jan. 25	Week 9 Feb. 1	Week 10 Feb. 8	Week 11 Feb. 15	Week 12 Feb. 22	Week 13 Mar. 1	Final Mar. 8	
1.	La Salle (2–0)	La Salle (4–0)	Kentucky (3–0)	Kentucky (5–0)	Kentucky (7–0) (89)	Kentucky (7–1) (52)	Kentucky (9–1)	Kentucky (12–1)	Kentucky (12–1)	San Francisco (16–1)	San Francisco (18–1)	San Francisco (20–1)	San Francisco (21–1)	San Francisco (23–1)	1.
2.	Kentucky (1–0)	Kentucky (2–0)	Utah (7–0)	NC State (10–0)	Duquesne (8–1) (14)	NC State (13–1) (22)	NC State (15–2)	San Francisco (12–1)	San Francisco (14–1)	Kentucky (14–2)	Kentucky (16–2)	Kentucky (18–2)	Kentucky (20–2)	Kentucky (22–2)	2.
3.	Duquesne (1–0)	Illinois (3–0)	Illinois (5–0)	La Salle (6–2)	NC State (12–1) (3)	Duquesne (9–2)	San Francisco (12–1)	NC State (16–3)	La Salle (14–4)	La Salle (16–4)	La Salle (18–4)	La Salle (20–4)	La Salle (22–4)	La Salle (22–4)	3.
4.	Iowa (2–0)	NC State (3–0)	La Salle (5–1)	Dayton (7–0)	La Salle (9–3) (2)	La Salle (10–3)	La Salle (12–3)	Duquesne (11–3)	Duquesne (11–3)	Duquesne (12–3)	Duquesne (15–3)	Duquesne (17–3)	Marquette (22–1)	NC State (28–4)	4.
5.	Holy Cross (1–0)	Dayton (4–0)	NC State (8–0)	San Francisco (7–1)	San Francisco (8–1) (4)	San Francisco (9–1)	Duquesne (10–3)	La Salle (13–4)	Utah (14–2)	Utah (17–2)	George Washington (18–3)	Marquette (20–1)	NC State (25–4)	Iowa (17–4)	5.
6.	Indiana (0–0)	Missouri (3–1)	Dayton (6–0)	Illinois (6–1)	George Washington (8–2)	Missouri (9–2)	Maryland (12–2)	George Washington (13–3)	NC State (16–4)	George Washington (15–3)	Marquette (18–1)	NC State (23–4)	Minnesota (15–6)	Duquesne (19–4)	6.
7.	Dayton (2–0)	Indiana (2–2)	Missouri (4–1)	Utah (7–2)	UCLA (1) (9–2)	Illinois (7–2)	Illinois (9–2)	Utah (13–2)	George Washington (13–3)	NC State (18–4)	NC State (21–4)	Minnesota (14–5)	Utah (21–3)	Utah (23–3)	7.
8.	Niagara (3–0)	UCLA (3–0)	George Washington (4–1)	Duquesne (4–1)	Utah (7–2)	George Washington (9–3)	Missouri (10–2)	Maryland (13–3)	UCLA (13–3)	UCLA (15–3)	Minnesota (12–5)	Utah (19–3)	Duquesne (19–4)	Marquette (22–2)	8.
9.	Notre Dame (1–0)	Duquesne (2–1)	Duquesne (4–1)	George Washington (5–2)	Missouri (7–2) (2)	Utah (9–2)	George Washington (11–3)	UCLA (11–3)	Marquette (15–1)	Marquette (16–1)	UCLA (16–3)	UCLA (19–3)	UCLA (21–4)	Dayton (23–3)	9.
10.	NC State (2–0)	Niagara (3–1)	Niagara (6–1)	Niagara (6–1)	Dayton (8–2)	UCLA (10–3)	UCLA (11–2)	Illinois (9–3)	Illinois (10–3)	Illinois (11–3)	Utah (18–3)	George Washington (19–4)	Dayton (22–3)	Oregon State (21–7)	10.
11.	Oklahoma A&M (2–0)	George Washington (3–0)	Ohio State (4–0)	Missouri (4–2)	Maryland (7–2)	Maryland (10–2)	Utah (11–3)	Marquette (13–1)	Minnesota (10–5)	Maryland (14–3)	Maryland (15–4)	Dayton (20–3)	Alabama (18–4)	Minnesota (15–7)	11.
12.	Saint Louis (1–0)	Louisville (6–0)	West Virginia (4–1)	Alabama (5–1)	Illinois (6–2)	Dayton (8–3)	Alabama (11–2)	Missouri (10–3)	Maryland (13–3)	Minnesota (11–5)	Cincinnati (19–3)	Alabama (16–4)	Iowa (14–4)	Alabama (19–5)	12.
13.	UCLA (1–0)	Iowa (4–1)	USC (5–1)	Louisville (8–1)	Minnesota (5–4)	Richmond (8–3)	Richmond (12–3)	Holy Cross (11–2)	Alabama (12–2)	Alabama (13–3)	Dayton (18–3)	Illinois (14–4)	George Washington (21–5)	UCLA (21–5)	13.
14.	Illinois (2–0)	Ohio State (3–0)	Louisville (7–1)	USC (6–3)	Iowa (6–2)	Minnesota (7–4)	Minnesota (8–4)	Alabama (11–2)	Holy Cross (11–2)	Missouri (12–3)	Illinois (12–4)	Vanderbilt (14–5)	Oregon State (19–7)	George Washington (24–6)	14.
15.	Wichita (0–0)	Utah (6–0)	Wichita (3–0)	UCLA (6–1)	Niagara (7–3)	Niagara (8–3)	Marquette (13–1)	Dayton (13–3)	Dayton (14–3)	Iowa (11–4)	Iowa (12–4)	Memphis State (17–3)	Tulsa (14–6)	Colorado (16–5)	15.
16.	Utah (2–0)	St. John's (3–0)	Penn (6–0)	Kansas (4–0)	Louisville (1) (10–2)	Alabama (9–2)	Holy Cross (10–2)	Northwestern (8–4)	Niagara (13–3)	Dayton (16–3)	Oregon State (14–6)	Iowa (14–4)	Vanderbilt (15–6)	Tulsa (20–6)	16.
17.	Duke (1–0) т	Wake Forest (4–1)	San Francisco (4–1)	Penn (6–0)	Duke (6–3)	Purdue (8–1)	Vanderbilt (8–1)	Richmond (12–3)	Missouri (10–3)	Cincinnati (17–3)	Alabama (14–4)	Cincinnati (19–5)	Illinois (15–5)	Vanderbilt (16–6)	17.
18.	Wake Forest (2–0) т	Wichita (2–0)	UCLA (5–1)	Duke (5–1)	Villanova (5–2)	USC (9–4)	Dayton (11–3)	Vanderbilt (10–2)	Villanova (11–4)	Oregon State (14–6)	Tennessee (13–3)	Maryland (16–5)	Maryland (17–6)	Illinois (17–5)	18.
19.	Penn State (1–0)	Holy Cross (2–1)	Alabama (4–1)	Iowa (5–2)	Penn (6–1)	Iowa (7–3)	Iowa (8–3)	Iowa (9–4)	Oregon State (12–6)	Villanova (12–4)	Tulsa (12–6)	Tulsa (17–6)	Memphis State (18–3)	West Virginia (19–10)	19.
20.	Western Kentucky (1–1)	Notre Dame (3–1)	Iowa (5–2) т Kansas (4–0) т	Ohio State (4–2)	Alabama (5–4) т Notre Dame (7–2) т Seton Hall (8–1) т	Auburn (6–0) т Louisville (11–3) т	Niagara (11–3) т TCU (11–3) т	Niagara (12–3)	Vanderbilt (10–3)	Vanderbilt (11–3)	Vanderbilt (13–4)	Missouri (15–3)	Missouri (15–4)	Saint Louis (19–7)	20.
	Week 1 Dec. 7	Week 2 Dec. 14	Week 3 Dec. 21	Week 4 Dec. 28	Week 5 Jan. 4	Week 6 Jan. 11	Week 7 Jan. 18	Week 8 Jan. 25	Week 9 Feb. 1	Week 10 Feb. 8	Week 11 Feb. 15	Week 12 Feb. 22	Week 13 Mar. 1	Final Mar. 8	
		Dropped: Oklahoma A&M (3–1); Saint Louis (2–1); Duke (2–1); Penn State; Western Kentucky	Dropped: Indiana (2–3); St. John's; Wake Forest; Holy Cross (4–1); Notre Dame	Dropped: West Virginia; Wichita	Dropped: USC; Kansas; Ohio State	Dropped: Duke; Villanova; Penn; Notre Dame; Seton Hall	Dropped: Purdue; USC; Auburn; Louisville	Dropped: Minnesota (8–5); TCU	Dropped: Northwestern; Richmond; Iowa	Dropped: Holy Cross; Niagara (15–3)	Dropped: Missouri (12–4); Villanova	Dropped: Oregon State (17–7); Tennessee	Dropped: Cincinnati (19–6)	Dropped: Maryland (17–7); Memphis State (18–4); Missouri (15–5)	

== UP Poll ==
	Week 1 Dec. 7	Week 2 Dec. 14	Week 3 Dec. 21	Week 4 Dec. 28	Week 5 Jan. 4	Week 6 Jan. 11	Week 7 Jan. 18	Week 8 Jan. 25	Week 9 Feb. 1	Week 10 Feb. 8	Week 11 Feb. 15	Week 12 Feb. 22	Week 13 Mar. 1	Final Mar. 8	
1.	La Salle (2–0)	La Salle (4–0)	Illinois (5–0)	Kentucky (5–0)	Kentucky (7–0)	Kentucky (7–1)	Kentucky (9–1)	Kentucky (11–1)	Kentucky (12–1)	San Francisco (16–1)	San Francisco (18–1)	San Francisco (20–1)	San Francisco (21–1)	San Francisco (23–1)	1.
2.	Iowa (2–0)	Kentucky (2–0)	Utah (7–0)	NC State (10–0)	Duquesne (8–1)	Duquesne (9–2)	La Salle (12–3)	NC State (16–3)	San Francisco (14–1)	Kentucky (14–2)	Kentucky (16–2)	Kentucky (18–2)	Kentucky (20–2)	Kentucky (22–2)	2.
3.	Duquesne (1–0)	Illinois (3–0)	Kentucky (3–0)	La Salle (6–2)	NC State (12–1)	La Salle (10–3)	Illinois (9–2)	San Francisco (12–1)	Utah (14–2)	La Salle (16–4)	La Salle (18–4)	La Salle (20–4)	La Salle (22–4)	La Salle (22–4)	3.
4.	Kentucky (1–0)	NC State (3–0)	La Salle (5–1)	Illinois (6–1)	La Salle (9–3)	NC State (13–1)	San Francisco (12–1)	Utah (13–2)	La Salle (14–4)	Utah (17–2)	Duquesne (15–3)	Minnesota (14–5)	NC State (25–4) т	Utah (23–3)	4.
5.	Indiana (0–0)	Indiana (2–2)	NC State (8–0)	Dayton (7–0)	San Francisco (8–1)	San Francisco (9–1)	NC State (15–2)	Duquesne (11–3)	Duquesne (11–3)	Duquesne (12–3)	Utah (18–3)	Duquesne (17–3)	Minnesota (15–6) т	Iowa (17–4)	5.
6.	Illinois (2–0)	UCLA (3–0)	Dayton (6–0)	San Francisco (7–1)	Missouri (7–2)	Illinois (7–2)	Duquesne (10–3)	La Salle (13–4)	NC State (16–4)	NC State (18–4)	UCLA (16–3)	UCLA (19–3)	Utah (21–3)	NC State (28–4)	6.
7.	NC State (2–0)	Duquesne (2–1)	Ohio State (4–0)	Utah (7–2)	Utah (7–2)	Utah (9–2)	Utah (11–2)	UCLA (11–3)	UCLA (13–3)	UCLA (15–3)	NC State (21–4)	NC State (23–4)	UCLA (21–4)	Duquesne (19–4)	7.
8.	Holy Cross (1–0)	Utah (6–0)	Missouri (4–1)	Duquesne (4–1)	Illinois (6–2)	Missouri (9–2)	Missouri (10–2)	George Washington (13–3)	George Washington (13–3)	George Washington (15–3)	Minnesota (12–5)	Utah (19–3)	Marquette (22–1)	Oregon State (21–7)	8.
9.	UCLA (1–0)	Missouri (3–1)	Niagara (6–1)	UCLA (6–1)	UCLA (9–2)	UCLA (10–3)	Minnesota (8–4)	Illinois (9–3) т	Minnesota (10–5)	Minnesota (11–5)	George Washington (18–3)	Marquette (20–1)	Duquesne (19–4)	Marquette (22–2)	9.
10.	Niagara (3–0)	Niagara (3–1) т	Duquesne (4–1)	Missouri (4–2)	Minnesota (5–4)	Minnesota (7–4)	UCLA (11–3)	Northwestern (8–4) т	Marquette (15–1)	Illinois (11–3)	Marquette (18–1)	George Washington (19–4)	Iowa (14–4)	Dayton (23–3)	10.
11.	Notre Dame (1–0)	Iowa (4–1) т	UCLA (5–1)	Niagara (6–1)	Dayton (8–2)	Dayton (8–3)	Maryland (12–2)	Missouri (10–3)	Illinois (10–3)	Marquette (16–1)	Illinois (12–4)	Illinois (14–4)	Dayton (22–3)	Colorado (16–5)	11.
12.	Dayton (2–0)	Dayton (4–0)	USC (5–1)	USC (6–3)	Niagara (7–3)	USC (9–4)	Iowa (8–3)	Maryland (13–3)	Missouri (10–3)	Iowa (11–4)	Missouri (12–4)	Iowa (14–4)	Oregon State (19–7)	UCLA (21–5)	12.
13.	Saint Louis (1–0) т	Ohio State (3–0)	Cincinnati (6–1)	Cincinnati (7–1)	George Washington (8–2)	Niagara (8–3)	Holy Cross (10–2)	Marquette (13–1)	Niagara (13–3)	Missouri (12–3)	Iowa (12–4)	Dayton (20–3)	Missouri (15–4)	Minnesota (15–7)	13.
14.	Utah (2–0) т	USC (3–1)	Iowa (5–2)	Kansas (4–0)	Maryland (7–2) т	Maryland (10–2) т	Marquette (13–1)	Holy Cross (11–2) т	Maryland (13–3)	Dayton (16–3)	Oregon State (14–6)	Oregon State (17–7)	George Washington (21–5)	Tulsa (20–6)	14.
15.	USC (1–0)	Notre Dame (3–1)	Wyoming (5–2)	California (7–1)	Iowa (6–2) т	Purdue (8–1) т	Dayton (11–3)	Niagara (12–3) т	Holy Cross (11–2) т	Oregon State (14–6)	Dayton (18–3)	Missouri (15–3)	Colorado (14–5)	George Washington (24–6)	15.
16.	DePaul (2–0)	Holy Cross (2–1)	Kansas (4–0)	Alabama (5–1)	Notre Dame (5–4)	Wichita (9–1)	Niagara (11–3)	Minnesota (8–5) т	Oregon State (12–6) т	Villanova (12–4)	Cincinnati (19–3)	Saint Louis (16–6)	Illinois (15–5)	Illinois (17–5)	16.
17.	Oklahoma A&M (2–0) т	Saint Louis (2–1)	Louisville (7–1)	Seton Hall (7–0)	Cincinnati (9–2) т	Iowa (7–3) т	Cincinnati (11–3)	Dayton (13–3)	Dayton (14–3) т	Cincinnati (17–3)	Maryland (15–4)	TCU (17–5)	Tulsa (14–6)	Niagara (20–5)	17.
18.	Oregon State (2–1) т	Oklahoma A&M (3–1)	Holy Cross (4–1)	Holy Cross (5–1)	Holy Cross (6–2) т	Xavier (7–3) т	George Washington (11–3)	Stanford (10–3)	Villanova (11–4) т	Maryland (14–3) т	Holy Cross (14–4) т	Colorado (12–5) т	Niagara (19–5)	Saint Louis (19–7)	18.
19.	Cincinnati (2–0)	George Washington (3–0) т	Wichita (3–0) т	Iowa (5–2)	Wisconsin (5–4)	George Washington (9–3) т	TCU (13–1) т	Oregon State (10–6)	Saint Louis (10–5)	Niagara (15–3) т	Saint Louis (13–6) т	Wyoming (16–7) т	Alabama (18–4)	Holy Cross (19–6)	19.
20.	Wichita (0–0)	Cincinnati (4–0) т	Alabama (4–1) т	Minnesota (4–2)	Alabama (7–2)	Louisville (11–3) т	Oregon State (8–6) т Saint Louis (8–5) т	Saint Louis (9–5)	Cincinnati (15–3)	Stanford (14–4)	Colorado (11–5)	Niagara (18–5)	Cincinnati (19–6) т Holy Cross (19–6) т Louisville (19–7) т Villanova (16–8) т	Cincinnati (19–7); SMU (15–8)	20.
	Week 1 Dec. 7	Week 2 Dec. 14	Week 3 Dec. 21	Week 4 Dec. 28	Week 5 Jan. 4	Week 6 Jan. 11	Week 7 Jan. 18	Week 8 Jan. 25	Week 9 Feb. 1	Week 10 Feb. 8	Week 11 Feb. 15	Week 12 Feb. 22	Week 13 Mar. 1	Final Mar. 8	
		Dropped: DePaul; Oregon State; Wichita (2–0)	Dropped: Indiana (2–3); Notre Dame; Saint Louis; Oklahoma A&M; George Washington (4–1)	Dropped: Ohio State; Wyoming; Louisville; Wichita	Dropped: USC; Kansas; California; Seton Hall (8–1)	Dropped: Notre Dame; Cincinnati; Holy Cross; Wisconsin; Alabama (9–2)	Dropped: USC; Purdue; Wichita; Xavier; Louisville	Dropped: Iowa (9–4); Cincinnati; TCU	Dropped: Northwestern; Stanford	Dropped: Holy Cross; Saint Louis	Dropped: Villanova; Niagara; Stanford	Dropped: Cincinnati; Maryland; Holy Cross	Dropped: Saint Louis; TCU; Wyoming	Dropped: Missouri (15–6); Alabama; Louisville (19–8); Villanova (16–9)	
