= 1955 National Invitation Tournament =

Annual NCAA basketball competition

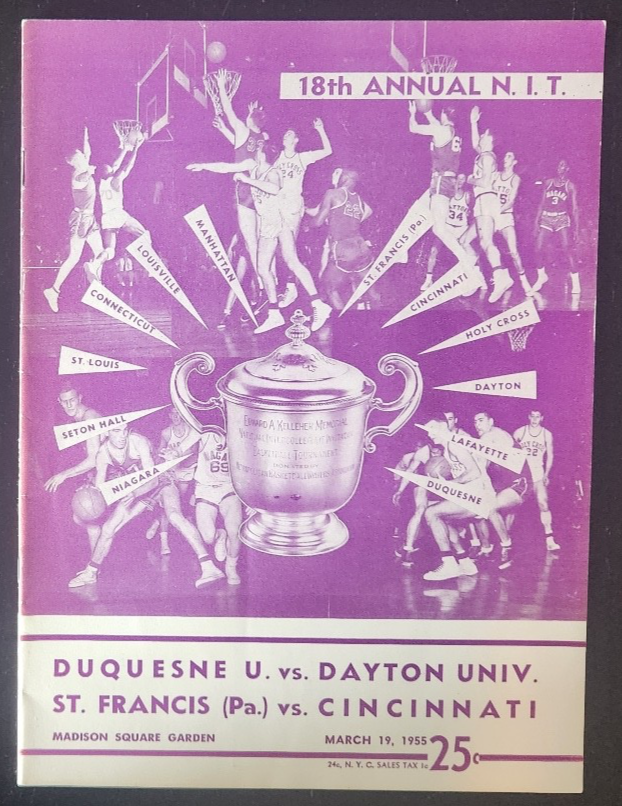
- Season: 1954–55
- Teams: 12
- Finals site: Madison Square Garden, New York City
- Champions: Duquesne Dukes (1st title)
- Runner-up: Dayton Flyers (3rd title game)
- Semifinalists: Cincinnati Bearcats (1st semifinal); St. Francis (PA) Red Flash (1st semifinal)
- Winning coach: Dudey Moore (1st title)
- MVP: Maurice Stokes (St. Francis (PA))

The 1955 National Invitation Tournament was the eighteenth edition of the annual NCAA college basketball competition.

== Selected teams ==
Below is a list of the 12 teams selected for the tournament.

- Cincinnati
- Connecticut
- Dayton
- Duquesne
- Holy Cross
- Lafayette
- Louisville
- Manhattan
- Niagara
- Saint Francis (PA)
- Saint Louis
- Seton Hall

== Bracket ==
Below is the tournament bracket.

First round
Louisville	91
Manhattan	86
Niagara	83
Lafayette	70
Saint Francis (PA)	89
Seton Hall	78
Saint Louis	110
Connecticut	103

Quarterfinals
Louisville	66
Duquesne	74
Cincinnati	85
Niagara	83
Saint Francis (PA)	68
Holy Cross	64
Dayton	97
Saint Louis	81

Semifinals; Thursday, March 17
Duquesne	65
Cincinnati	61
Saint Francis (PA)	73
Dayton	79

Final; Saturday, March 19
Duquesne	70
Dayton	58

Third place game Saturday, March 19
Cincinnati	96
Saint Francis (PA)	91

== See also ==
- 1955 NCAA basketball tournament
- 1955 NAIA Basketball Tournament
