= 1954–55 Wisconsin Badgers men's basketball team =

American college basketball season

1954–55 Wisconsin Badgers men's basketball
- Conference: Big Ten Conference
- Record: 10–12 (5–9 Big Ten)
- Head coach: Harold E. Foster
- Home arena: UW Fieldhouse

1954–55 Big Ten Conference men's basketball standings
	Conf.				Overall
Team	W		L	PCT	W		L	PCT
No. 5 Iowa	11	–	3	.786	19	–	7	.731
No. 18 Illinois	10	–	4	.714	17	–	5	.773
No. 11 Minnesota	10	–	4	.714	15	–	7	.682
Michigan State	8	–	6	.571	13	–	9	.591
Northwestern	7	–	7	.500	12	–	10	.545
Purdue	5	–	9	.357	12	–	10	.545
Michigan	5	–	9	.357	11	–	11	.500
Wisconsin	5	–	9	.357	10	–	12	.455
Indiana	5	–	9	.357	8	–	14	.364
Ohio State	4	–	10	.286	10	–	12	.455
Rankings from AP Poll

The 1954–55 Wisconsin Badgers men's basketball team represented University of Wisconsin–Madison. The head coach was Harold E. Foster, coaching his twentyfirst season with the Badgers. The team played their home games at the UW Fieldhouse in Madison, Wisconsin and was a member of the Big Ten Conference.

== Schedule ==
Date time, TV	Rank^{#}	Opponent^{#}	Result	Record	Site city, state
Regular Season
12/04/1954*		at Notre Dame	L 61–72	0–1	Notre Dame Fieldhouse; Notre Dame, IN
12/06/1954*		Western Michigan	W 80–68	1–1	UW Fieldhouse; Madison, WI
12/11/1954*		at Oklahoma	W 77–66	2–1	McCasland Field House; Norman, OK
12/13/1954*		at Missouri	L 56–67	2–2	Brewer Fieldhouse; Columbia, MO
12/18/1954*		LSU	W 107–68	3–2	UW Fieldhouse; Madison, WI
12/20/1954*		Tulane	L 66–69	3–3	UW Fieldhouse; Madison, WI
12/29/1954*		Princeton	W 66–64	4–3	UW Fieldhouse; Madison, WI
1/01/1955		at Illinois	W 79–64	5–3 (1–0)	Huff Hall; Champaign, IL
1/03/1955		Iowa	L 69–86	5–4 (1–1)	UW Fieldhouse; Madison, WI
1/08/1955		at Michigan State	L 77–94	5–5 (1–2)	Jenison Fieldhouse; East Lansing, MI
1/10/1955		at Michigan	L 63–90	5–6 (1–3)	Yost Field House; Ann Arbor, MI
1/15/1955		Indiana	W 77–66	6–6 (2–3)	UW Fieldhouse; Madison, WI
1/17/1955*		at Butler	W 57–53	7–6	Butler Fieldhouse; Indianapolis, IN
2/05/1955		Michigan State	L 70–73	7–7 (2–4)	UW Fieldhouse; Madison, WI
2/07/1955		at Indiana	L 58–65	7–8 (2–5)	The Fieldhouse; Bloomington, IN
2/12/1955		Ohio State	W 86–63	8–8 (3–5)	UW Fieldhouse; Madison, WI
2/14/1955		at Purdue	L 63–75	8–9 (3–6)	Lambert Fieldhouse; West Lafayette, IN
2/19/1955		Illinois	L 71–99	8–10 (3–7)	UW Fieldhouse; Madison, WI
2/21/1955		Minnesota	L 69–71	8–11 (3–8)	UW Fieldhouse; Madison, WI
2/26/1955		at Northwestern	L 72–80	8–12 (3–9)	Welsh-Ryan Arena; Evanston, IL
2/28/1955		Purdue	W 75–73	9–12 (4–9)	UW Fieldhouse; Madison, WI
3/05/1955		at Minnesota	W 78–72	10–12 (5–9)	Williams Arena; Minneapolis, MN
*Non-conference game. ^{#}Rankings from AP Poll. (#) Tournament seedings in parentheses.
