= 1954–55 Auburn Tigers men's basketball team =

American college basketball season

1954–55 Auburn Tigers men's basketball

Blue–Gray Tournament champions
- Conference: Southeastern Conference
- Record: 11–9 (6–8 SEC)
- Head coach: Joel Eaves (6th season)
- Captain: Bill Kirkpatrick
- Home arena: Auburn Sports Arena

The 1954–55 Auburn Tigers men's basketball team represented Auburn University in the 1954–55 college basketball season. The team's head coach was Joel Eaves, who was in his sixth season at Auburn. The team played their home games at Auburn Sports Arena in Auburn, Alabama. They finished the season 11–9, 6–8 in SEC play.
