= 1954–55 Illinois Fighting Illini men's basketball team =

American college basketball season

1954–55 Illinois Fighting Illini men's basketball
- Conference: Big Ten Conference

Ranking
- Coaches: No. 16
- AP: No. 18
- Record: 17–5 (10-4 Big Ten)
- Head coach: Harry Combes (8th season)
- Assistant coach: Howie Braun (18th season)
- MVP: Paul Judson
- Captain: Morris Sterneck
- Home arena: Huff Hall

1954–55 Big Ten Conference men's basketball standings
	Conf.				Overall
Team	W		L	PCT	W		L	PCT
No. 5 Iowa	11	–	3	.786	19	–	7	.731
No. 18 Illinois	10	–	4	.714	17	–	5	.773
No. 11 Minnesota	10	–	4	.714	15	–	7	.682
Michigan State	8	–	6	.571	13	–	9	.591
Northwestern	7	–	7	.500	12	–	10	.545
Purdue	5	–	9	.357	12	–	10	.545
Michigan	5	–	9	.357	11	–	11	.500
Wisconsin	5	–	9	.357	10	–	12	.455
Indiana	5	–	9	.357	8	–	14	.364
Ohio State	4	–	10	.286	10	–	12	.455
Rankings from AP Poll

The 1954–55 Illinois Fighting Illini men’s basketball team represented the University of Illinois.

== Regular season ==
Head coach Harry Combes, in his eighth year at Illinois, directed a youthful team with only three returning seniors, none of which were regular players. Combes' team, once again, was primarily made of sophomores and juniors recruited from the state of Illinois.

The 1954-55 team had some talented juniors including the return of twin brothers, Paul and Phil Judson from Hebron, Illinois, Bruce Brothers and Bill Ridley. It also added sophomores George Bon Salle, Bill Altenberger, Hiles Stout, and future Illini head coach, Harv Schmidt. Exactly like the previous season, the Illini finished with a conference record of 10 wins and 4 losses, finishing in a 2nd place tie in the Big Ten. The Illini lost 5 total games with three of the five losses coming at the hands of ranked opponents. The starting lineup included George Bon Salle at the center position, Bill Ridley and Bill Altenberger at guard and Bruce Brothers and Paul Judson at the forward slots.

=== Roster ===
1954–55 Illinois Fighting Illini men's basketball team
Players
Coaches

Pos.	#	Name	Height	Weight	Year	Previous school	Hometown
G	7	Morris Sterneck (C)	6 ft 1 in (1.85 m)	175 lb (79 kg)	Sr	Salem High School	Salem, Illinois
G	9	Elmer Plew	6 ft 0 in (1.83 m)	170 lb (77 kg)	Sr	Paris High School	Paris, Illinois
F	10	Hiles Stout	6 ft 4 in (1.93 m)	205 lb (93 kg)	So	Central High School	Peoria, Illinois
G	11	Bill Ridley	5 ft 9 in (1.75 m)	160 lb (73 kg)	Jr	Taylorville High School	Taylorville, Illinois
F	16	James Burks	6 ft 8 in (2.03 m)	210 lb (95 kg)	So	Caverna High School	Horse Cave, Kentucky
G	20	Bill Altenberger	6 ft 1 in (1.85 m)	175 lb (79 kg)	So	Senior High School	East St. Louis, Illinois
C	22	George Bon Salle	6 ft 7 in (2.01 m)	215 lb (98 kg)	So	Loyola Academy	Chicago, Illinois
F	27	Jim Dutcher	6 ft 3 in (1.91 m)	185 lb (84 kg)	Sr	Downers Grove High School	Downers Grove, Illinois
G	30	Phil Judson	6 ft 2 in (1.88 m)	165 lb (75 kg)	Jr	Alden-Hebron High School	Hebron, Illinois
F	32	Bruce Brothers	6 ft 5 in (1.96 m)	200 lb (91 kg)	Jr	Quincy Senior High School	Quincy, Illinois
G	33	Harvard Schmidt	6 ft 6 in (1.98 m)	190 lb (86 kg)	So	Kankakee High School	Kankakee, Illinois
G	34	Paul Judson	6 ft 3 in (1.91 m)	170 lb (77 kg)	Jr	Alden-Hebron High School	Hebron, Illinois

Head coach

- Harry Combes (University of Illinois) (8th year)

Assistant coach(es)

- Howie Braun (University of Illinois) (18th year)

Legend

- (C) Team captain
- (S) Suspended
- (I) Ineligible
- (W) Walk-on
- Injured
- Current redshirt

Roster

== Schedule ==
Date time, TV	Rank^{#}	Opponent^{#}	Result	Record	Site (attendance) city, state
Non-Conference regular season
12/2/1954*		Butler	W 88–34	1-0	Huff Hall (4,566); Champaign, IL
12/4/1954*		Missouri; Rivalry	W 77–69	2-0	Huff Hall (4,766); Champaign, IL
12/11/1954*	No. 14	at No. 11 Oklahoma A&M	W 59–53	3-0	Gallagher Hall (8,200); Stillwater, OK
12/15/1954*	No. 3	Miami (OH)	W 97–72	4-0	Huff Hall (4,898); Champaign, IL
12/18/1954*	No. 3	No. 20 Notre Dame	W 66–57	5-0	Huff Hall (6,804); Champaign, IL
12/21/1954*	No. 3	at Rice	W 86–53	6-0	Tudor Fieldhouse (3,300); Houston, TX
12/22/1954*	No. 3	at Loyola (New Orleans)	L 66–72	6-1	The Den (-); New Orleans, LA
Big Ten regular season
1/1/1955	No. 6	Wisconsin	L 64–79	6-2 (0-1)	Huff Hall (6,912); Champaign, IL
1/8/1955	No. 12	Indiana; Rivalry	L 64–67	7-2 (1-1)	Huff Hall (6,912); Champaign, IL
1/10/1955	No. 12	at Purdue	W 83–73	8-2 (2-1)	Lambert Fieldhouse (9,700); West Lafayette, IN
1/15/1955	No. 7	at Ohio State	W 86–78	9-2 (3-1)	Ohio Expo Center Coliseum (6,154); Columbus, OH
1/17/1955	No. 7	at No. 19 Iowa; Rivalry	L 80–92	9-3 (3-2)	Iowa Field House (15,000); Iowa City, IA
1/29/1955*	No. 10	at Loyola (Chicago)	W 95–69	10-3	Chicago Stadium (12,181); Chicago, IL
2/5/1955	No. 10	Northwestern; Rivalry	W 104–89	11-3 (4-2)	Huff Hall (5,844); Champaign, IL
2/7/1955	No. 10	at Michigan	W 81–80	12-3 (5-2)	Yost Field House (6,913); Ann Arbor, MI
2/12/1955	No. 10	at No. 12 Minnesota	L 71–78 ^{OT}	12-4 (5-3)	Williams Arena (11,879); Minneapolis, MN
2/14/1955	No. 10	Michigan State	W 90–72	13-4 (6-3)	Huff Hall (6,912); Champaign, IL
2/19/1955	No. 14	at Wisconsin	W 99–71	14-4 (7-3)	Wisconsin Field House (12,100); Madison, WI
2/21/1955	No. 14	No. 15 Iowa; Rivalry	L 70–89	14-5 (7-4)	Huff Hall (6,912); Champaign, IL
2/26/1955	No. 13	Ohio State	W 85–77	15-5 (8-4)	Huff Hall (5,829); Champaign, IL
2/28/1955	No. 13	Michigan	W 81–75	16-5 (9-4)	Huff Hall (4,366); Champaign, IL
3/5/1955	No. 17	at Northwestern; Rivalry	W 81–69	17-5 (10-4)	McGaw Memorial Hall (9,765); Evanston, IL
*Non-conference game. ^{#}Rankings from AP Poll. (#) Tournament seedings in parentheses. All times are in Central Time.

== Player stats ==
Player	Games played	Field goals	Free throws	Points
Paul Judson	22	139	85	363
Bill Ridley	22	123	88	334
George BonSalle	20	98	67	263
Bruce Brothers	22	93	55	241
Bill Altenberger	22	91	25	207
Hiles Stout	16	40	44	124
Harv Schmidt	21	36	28	100
Phil Judson	22	35	22	92
Jim Dutcher	13	20	20	60
Morris Sterneck	12	4	1	9
Elmer Plew	12	3	3	9
James Burks	7	2	2	6
Dick Rapp	2	0	0	0
William Bosnak	2	0	0	0

== Awards and honors ==
- Paul Judson
  - International News Service Honorable Mention All-American
  - Converse Honorable Mention All-American
  - Team Most Valuable Player
- Bill Ridley
  - Associated Press Honorable Mention All-American
  - Converse Honorable Mention All-American
- George Bon Salle
  - Converse Honorable Mention All-American

== Team players drafted into the NBA ==
Player	NBA club	Round	Pick
No Player Drafted			
