= 1954–55 Connecticut Huskies men's basketball team =

American college basketball season

1954–55 Connecticut Huskies men's basketball

Yankee Conference Regular Season Champions

National Invitation Tournament, First Round
- Conference: Yankee Conference
- Record: 20–5 (8–0 YC)
- Head coach: Hugh Greer (9th season)
- Assistant coach: Nick Rodis
- Home arena: Hugh S. Greer Field House

1954–55 Yankee Conference men's basketball standings
	Conf.				Overall
Team	W		L	PCT	W		L	PCT
Connecticut	7	–	0	1.000	20	–	5	.800
Vermont	4	–	1	.800	6	–	15	.286
Massachusetts	4	–	2	.667	10	–	14	.417
Rhode Island	5	–	3	.625	17	–	10	.630
Maine	1	–	7	.125	4	–	13	.235
New Hampshire	1	–	9	.100	4	–	14	.222

The 1954–55 Connecticut Huskies men's basketball team represented the University of Connecticut in the 1954–55 collegiate men's basketball season. The Huskies completed the season with a 20–5 overall record. The Huskies were members of the Yankee Conference, where they ended the season with an 8–0 record. They were the Yankee Conference regular season champions and made it to the first round of the 1955 National Invitation Tournament. The Huskies played their home games at Hugh S. Greer Field House in Storrs, Connecticut, and were led by ninth-year head coach Hugh Greer.

== Schedule ==
Date time, TV	Rank^{#}	Opponent^{#}	Result	Record	Site (attendance) city, state
Regular Season
12/1/1954		Rhode Island	W 116–77	1–0 (1–0)	Hugh S. Greer Field House; Storrs, CT
12/3/1954*		St. Joseph's (PA)	W 79–78	2–0	Hugh S. Greer Field House; Storrs, CT
12/8/1954*		at Yale	W 83–57	3–0	Payne Whitney Gymnasium; New Haven, CT
12/13/1954*		at Boston College	W 117–74	4–0	Boston, MA
12/17/1954*		American International	W 103–78	5–0	Hugh S. Greer Field House; Storrs, CT
12/21/1954*		at Manhattan	W 90–79	6–0	Manhattan, NY
12/27/1954*		Harvard; New England Tournament	W 98–60	7–0	Hugh S. Greer Field House; Storrs, CT
12/28/1954*		Brown; New England Tournament	W 91–68	8–0	Hugh S. Greer Field House; Storrs, CT
12/29/1954*		Dartmouth; New England Tournament	L 68–69	8–1	Hugh S. Greer Field House; Storrs, CT
1/5/1955		New Hampshire	W 102–84	9–1 (2–0)	Hugh S. Greer Field House; Storrs, CT
1/6/1955		Maine	W 99–58	10–1 (3–0)	Hugh S. Greer Field House; Storrs, CT
1/8/1955		Rhode Island	W 92–83	11–1 (4–0)	Hugh S. Greer Field House; Storrs, CT
1/11/1955*		Boston University	W 84–75	12–1	Hugh S. Greer Field House; Storrs, CT
1/15/1955*		Boston College	W 95–76	13–1	Hugh S. Greer Field House; Storrs, CT
1/29/1955*		at Northeastern	W 72–44	14–1	Matthews Arena; Boston, MA
2/2/1955*		Fordham	L 65–70	14–2	Hugh S. Greer Field House; Storrs, CT
2/5/1955*		Colgate	W 93–85	15–2	Hugh S. Greer Field House; Storrs, CT
2/8/1955*		at Dartmouth	L 54–69	15–3	Alumni Gymnasium; Hanover, NH
2/11/1955		at New Hampshire	W 103–85	16–3 (5–0)	Lundholm Gym; Durham, NH
2/12/1955		at Maine	W 116–73	17–3 (6–0)	Memorial Gymnasium; Orono, ME
2/16/1955*		at Rutgers	W 91–78	18–3	College Avenue Gymnasium; Newark, NJ
2/19/1955		at Rhode Island	W 90–72	19–3 (7–0)	Keaney Gymnasium; Kingston, RI
2/22/1955		Massachusetts	W 93–75	20–3 (8–0)	Hugh S. Greer Field House; Storrs, CT
2/26/1955*		Holy Cross	L 58–60	20–4	Hugh S. Greer Field House; Storrs, CT
National Invitation Tournament
3/12/1955*		vs. St. Louis; First Round	L 103–110	20–5	Madison Square Garden; New York, NY
*Non-conference game. ^{#}Rankings from AP Poll. (#) Tournament seedings in parentheses. All times are in Eastern Time.

Schedule Source:
