= 1954–55 Indiana Hoosiers men's basketball team =

American college basketball season

1954–55 Indiana Hoosiers men's basketball
- Conference: Big Ten Conference
- Record: 8–14 (5–9 Big Ten)
- Head coach: Branch McCracken (14th season)
- Assistant coaches: Ernie Andres; Phil Buck
- Captain: Don Schlundt
- Home arena: The Fieldhouse

1954–55 Big Ten Conference men's basketball standings
	Conf.				Overall
Team	W		L	PCT	W		L	PCT
No. 5 Iowa	11	–	3	.786	19	–	7	.731
No. 18 Illinois	10	–	4	.714	17	–	5	.773
No. 11 Minnesota	10	–	4	.714	15	–	7	.682
Michigan State	8	–	6	.571	13	–	9	.591
Northwestern	7	–	7	.500	12	–	10	.545
Purdue	5	–	9	.357	12	–	10	.545
Michigan	5	–	9	.357	11	–	11	.500
Wisconsin	5	–	9	.357	10	–	12	.455
Indiana	5	–	9	.357	8	–	14	.364
Ohio State	4	–	10	.286	10	–	12	.455
Rankings from AP Poll

The 1954–55 Indiana Hoosiers men's basketball team represented Indiana University. Their head coach was Branch McCracken, who was in his 14th year. The team played its home games in The Fieldhouse in Bloomington, Indiana, and was a member of the Big Ten Conference.

The Hoosiers finished the regular season with an overall record of 8–14 and a conference record of 5–9, finishing 6th in the Big Ten Conference. Indiana was not invited to participate in any postseason tournament.

== Roster ==
No.	Name	Position	Ht.	Year	Hometown
13	Dick Baumgartner	G	6–1	Sr.	LaPorte, Indiana
14	Phil Byers	G	5–11	Sr.	Evansville, Indiana
15	Neal Skeeters	G	5–11	Jr.	Louisville, Kentucky
20	Jim Barley	G	6–2	Jr.	Marion, Indiana
21	Hallie Bryant	G	6–3	So.	Indianapolis, Indiana
22	Warren Fisher	F	6–3	Jr.	Fort Wayne, Indiana
23	Jim Phipps	G	5–11	Jr.	Kokomo, Indiana
23	Charlie Hodson	G	5–9	So.	Muncie, Indiana
24	John Wood	G	5–7	Sr.	Morristown, Indiana
25	Burke Scott	G	6–1	Sr.	Tell City, Indiana
31	Paul Poff	G	6–1	Sr.	New Albany, Indiana
32	Dick Kirkpatrick	F	6–3	So.	Terre Haute, Indiana
33	Bill Maetschke	F	6–4	Jr.	New Albany, Indiana
34	Don Schlundt	C	6–10	Sr.	South Bend, Indiana
35	Dick Neal	F	6–5	So.	Reelsville, Indiana
41	Dick White	F	6–1	Sr.	Terre Haute, Indiana
42	Charles Mead	G	6–3	Jr.	Oak Park, Illinois
43	Cliff Williamson	F	6–3	Sr.	Kokomo, Indiana
44	Wally Choice	F	6–4	Jr.	Montclair, New Jersey
45	Frank Stemle	F	6–3	Jr.	New Albany, Indiana

== Schedule/results ==
Date time, TV	Rank^{#}	Opponent^{#}	Result	Record	Site city, state
Regular season
12/4/1954*		Valparaiso	W 77–66	1–0	The Fieldhouse; Bloomington, Indiana
12/6/1954*		Missouri	L 61–64	1–1	The Fieldhouse; Bloomington, Indiana
12/11/1954*	No. 6	at Notre Dame	W 73–70	2–1	Notre Dame Fieldhouse; Notre Dame, Indiana
12/13/1954*	No. 6	SMU	L 78–83	2–2	The Fieldhouse; Bloomington, Indiana
12/18/1954*	No. 7	at Cincinnati	L 65–97	2–3	Armory Fieldhouse; Cincinnati
12/21/1954*		at Kansas State	L 74–91	2–4	Ahearn Field House; Manhattan, Kansas
12/27/1954*		at Saint Louis	L 78–80	2–5	Kiel Auditorium; St. Louis
1/3/1955		Michigan	W 95–77	3–5 (1–0)	The Fieldhouse; Bloomington, Indiana
1/8/1955		at Illinois; Rivalry	L 75–99	3–6 (1–1)	Huff Hall; Champaign, Illinois
1/10/1955		at Minnesota	L 74–88	3–7 (1–2)	Williams Arena; Minneapolis
1/15/1955		at Wisconsin	L 66–77	3–8 (1–3)	Wisconsin Field House; Madison, Wisconsin
1/17/1955		Michigan State	W 88–79	4–8 (2–3)	The Fieldhouse; Bloomington, Indiana
1/31/1955*		Butler	W 87–56	5–8 (2–3)	The Fieldhouse; Bloomington, Indiana
2/5/1955		at Ohio State	L 87–90	5–9 (2–4)	Ohio Expo Center Coliseum; Columbus, Ohio
2/7/1955		Wisconsin	W 65–58	6–9 (3–4)	The Fieldhouse; Bloomington, Indiana
2/12/1955		at Iowa	L 75–90	6–10 (3–5)	Iowa Field House; Iowa City, IA
2/14/1955		Minnesota	L 70–80	6–11 (3–6)	The Fieldhouse; Bloomington, Indiana
2/19/1955		Northwestern	L 78–85	6–12 (3–7)	The Fieldhouse; Bloomington, Indiana
2/21/1955		Purdue; Rivalry	W 75–62	7–12 (4–7)	The Fieldhouse; Bloomington, Indiana
2/26/1955		at Purdue; Rivalry	L 67–92	7–13 (4–8)	Lambert Fieldhouse; West Lafayette, Indiana
2/28/1955		at Michigan State	L 77–93	7–14 (4–9)	Jenison Fieldhouse; East Lansing, Michigan
3/5/1955		Ohio State	W 84–66	8–14 (5–9)	The Fieldhouse; Bloomington, Indiana
*Non-conference game. ^{#}Rankings from AP Poll. (#) Tournament seedings in parentheses.
