= Alexander Shaw =

Alexander Shaw may refer to:

- Alexander Shaw (surgeon) (1804–1890), Scottish surgeon
- Alexander Shaw (Canadian politician) (1833–1911), Canadian lawyer and politician
- Alexander Croft Shaw (1846–1902), Canadian Anglican missionary to Japan
- Alexander Preston Shaw (1879–1966), African-American clergyman
- Alexander William Shaw (1847–1923), Irish bacon manufacturer and golf enthusiast
- Alexander Shaw, 2nd Baron Craigmyle (1883–1944), MP for Kilmarnock, 1915–1923
- Alexander Shaw (cricketer) (1907–1945), English cricketer
- Alexander Shaw (British Army officer) (1737–1811), soldier and Lieutenant Governor of the Isle of Man
- Alex Shaw (rugby union) (born 1987), rugby player
- Alex Shaw (basketball) (1907–2009), college men's basketball coach
- Alex Shaw (soccer), Canadian soccer player
