= Hal Perry (basketball) =

American basketball player and attorney

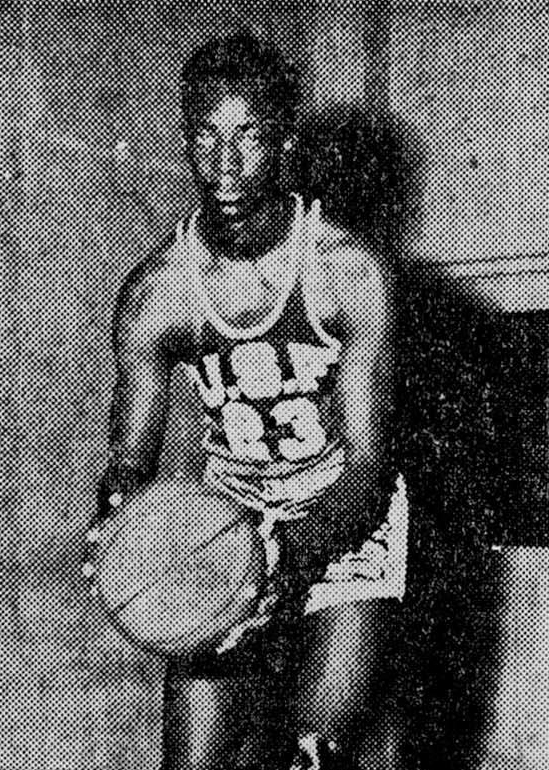
- Perry with San Francisco circa 1955

Personal information
- Born: December 15, 1933
- Died: April 30, 2009 (aged 75) El Cerrito, California, U.S.

Career information
- High school: Ukiah (Ukiah, California)
- College: San Francisco (1953–1956)
- NBA draft: 1956: undrafted
- Position: Guard
- Number: 23

Career highlights
- 2× NCAA champion (1955–1956); Second-team All-CBA (1956)

Harold L. Perry (December 15, 1933 – April 30, 2009) was an American basketball player and attorney famous for being a starter on the University of San Francisco back to back NCAA championship teams of 1955 and 1956.

Perry, a guard from Ukiah High School in Ukiah, California, made history when he teamed up with future Hall of Fame players K. C. Jones and Bill Russell to make San Francisco the first college to win an NCAA tournament title with three black starters in the 1954–55 NCAA men's basketball season, Perry's junior year. Hal Perry averaged 6.9 points and 1.9 rebounds per game that year.

His senior season, the Dons outdid themselves, going undefeated and repeating as national champions. Perry increased his scoring average to 9.1 points per game for the year and was named second team all-conference. However, when star guard Jones was declared ineligible for the 1956 NCAA tournament, coach Phil Woolpert asked Perry to take a larger role. Perry responded by averaging 14 points per game in the Final Four and joined national player of the year Russell on the All-Tournament team.

Following his graduation from USF, Perry played briefly for the Harlem Globetrotters. However, Globetrotters owner Abe Saperstein told Perry he was too smart for the barnstorming life and offered to pay his way to law school. Perry took him up on his offer and went to Lincoln Law School. He ran a successful private practice for many years.

Perry died on April 30, 2009, after a long illness.
