= 1955 NCAA basketball championship game =

1955 NCAA Tournament Championship Game
National championship game
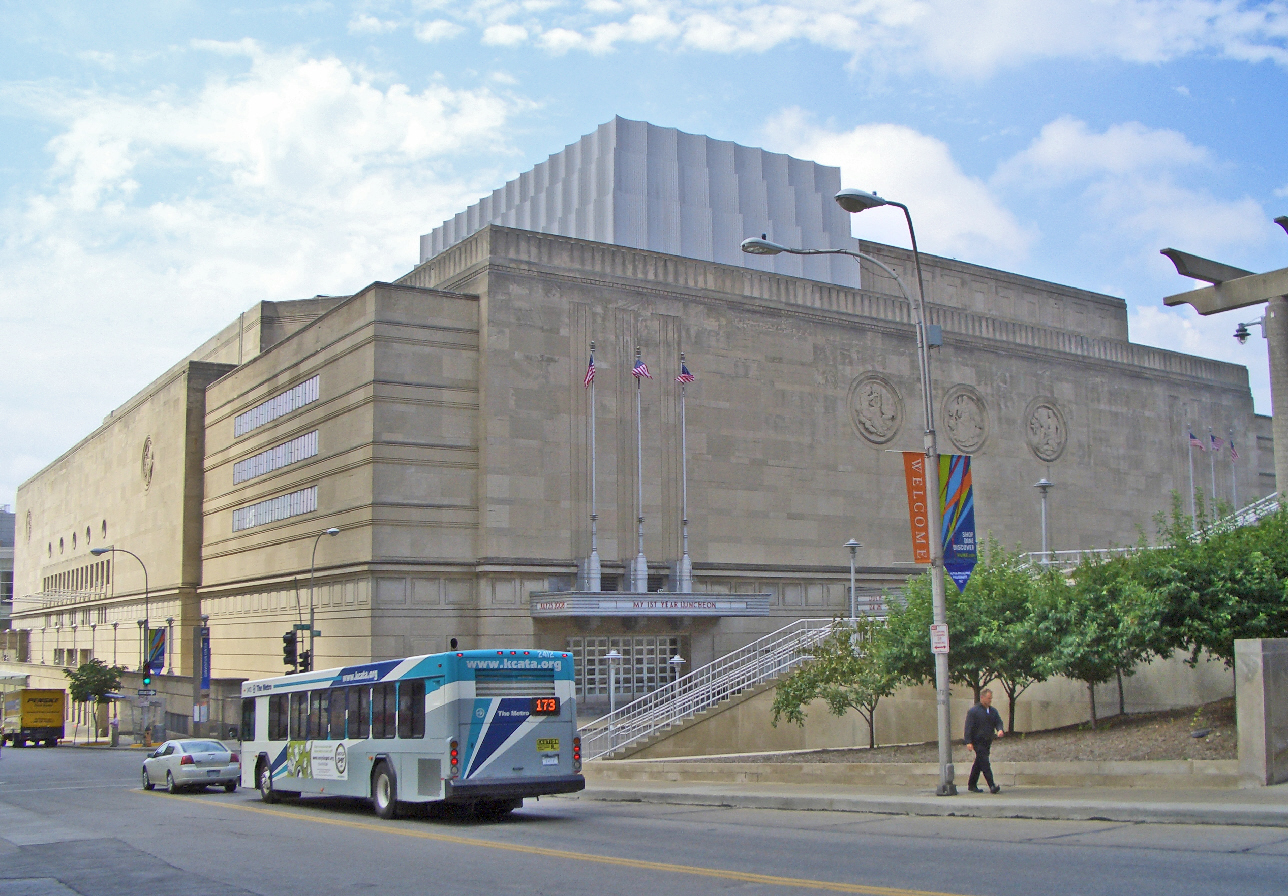
- The Municipal Auditorium in Kansas City, Missouri, hosted the championship game.
San Francisco Dons	La Salle Explorers
CBA	Independent
(27-1)	(25-5)
77	63
Head coach: Phil Woolpert	Head coach: Ken Loeffler
- AP: 1
- Coaches: 1
- AP: 3
- Coaches: 3
	1st half	2nd half	Total
San Francisco Dons	35	42	77
La Salle Explorers	24	39	63
- Date: March 19, 1955
- Venue: Municipal Auditorium, Kansas City, Missouri
- MVP: Bill Russell, San Francisco

The 1955 NCAA University Division Basketball Championship Game was the finals of the 1955 NCAA basketball tournament and it determined the national champion for the 1954-55 NCAA men's basketball season. The game was played on March 19, 1955, at Municipal Auditorium in Kansas City, Missouri. It featured the San Francisco Dons of the California Basketball Association, and the independent La Salle Explorers, the defending national champions.

== Participating teams ==
=== San Francisco Dons ===
- West-2
  - San Francisco 98, West Texas State 66
  - San Francisco 78, Utah 59
  - San Francisco 57, Oregon State 56
- Final Four
  - San Francisco 62, Colorado 50

=== La Salle Explorers ===
- Midwest
  - La Salle 95, West Virginia 61
  - La Salle 73, Princeton 46
  - La Salle 99, Canisius 64
- Final Four
  - La Salle 76, Iowa 73

== Game summary ==
March 19, 1955

#1 San Francisco Dons 77, #3 La Salle Explorers 63
Scoring by half: 35-24, 42-39
Pts: K.C. Jones 24; Rebs: Bill Russell 25	Pts: Charles Singley 20; Rebs: Tom Gola 18

Municipal Auditorium, Kansas City, Missouri
