= UPI Coach of the Year =

UPI Coach of the Year may refer to:

- UPI College Basketball Coach of the Year, an annual United Press International award given from 1955 through 1996 to the best men's basketball head coach in NCAA Division I competition
- UPI NFL Coach of the Year, an annual National Football League Coach of the Year Award presented from 1955 through 1996 by United Press International
