= UPI College Basketball Coach of the Year =

College basketball award

- Awarded for: the best men's basketball head coach in NCAA Division I
- Country: United States
- Presented by: United Press International

History
- First award: 1952
- Final award: 1996

The UPI College Basketball Coach of the Year was an annual basketball award given to the best men's basketball head coach in NCAA Division I competition. The award was first given following the 1951–52 season and was discontinued following the 1995–96 season. It voted upon by over 230 sportswriters and broadcasters across the country and was presented by United Press International (UPI), a news agency in the United States that rivaled the Associated Press. UPI began to shrink in the 1990s primarily due to its ongoing financial decline, bankruptcy, and restructuring.

UCLA claimed the most all-time winners with six (all of whom were John Wooden), followed by San Francisco with three. Five additional schools claimed two winners apiece. Wooden garnered the most UPI Coach of the Year awards. Seven other coaches received the award twice: Bob Knight, Ray Meyer, Adolph Rupp, Norm Stewart, Fred Taylor, Phil Woolpert, and Ken Loeffler.

== Key ==
Coach (X)	Denotes the number of times the coach has been awarded the UPI Coach of the Year Award at that point
W, L, W %	Total wins, total losses, win percentage
Finish	National postseason tournament result
C	Denotes national championship season

== Winners ==
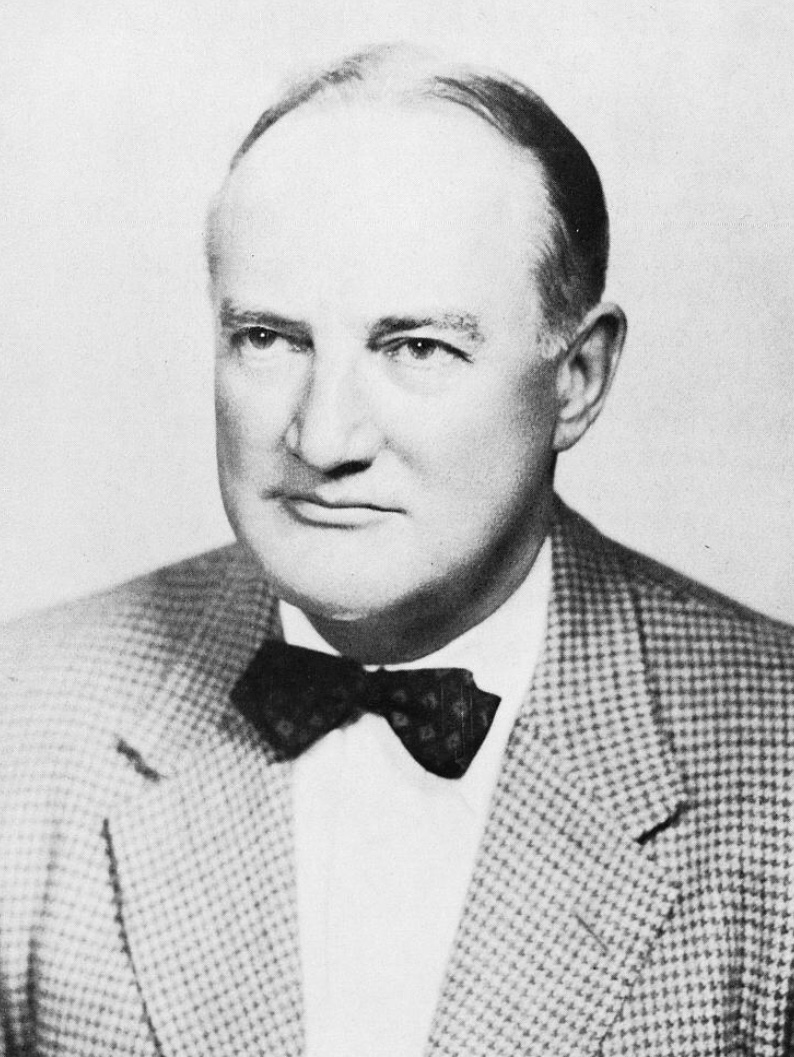
Ken Loeffler, La Salle, 1952 and 1954

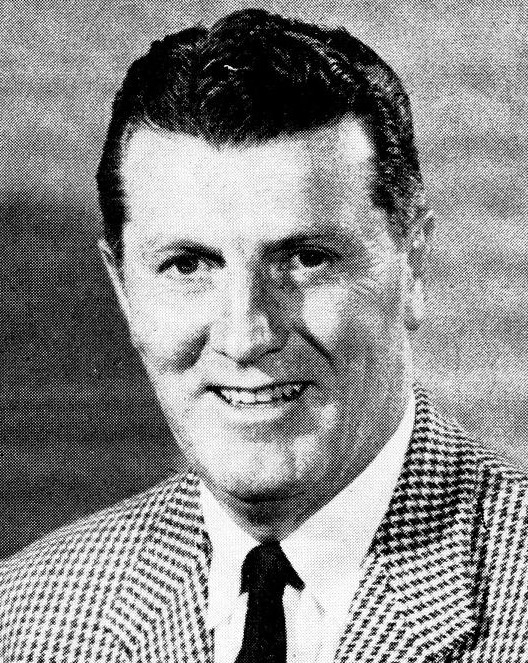
Frank McGuire, North Carolina, 1957

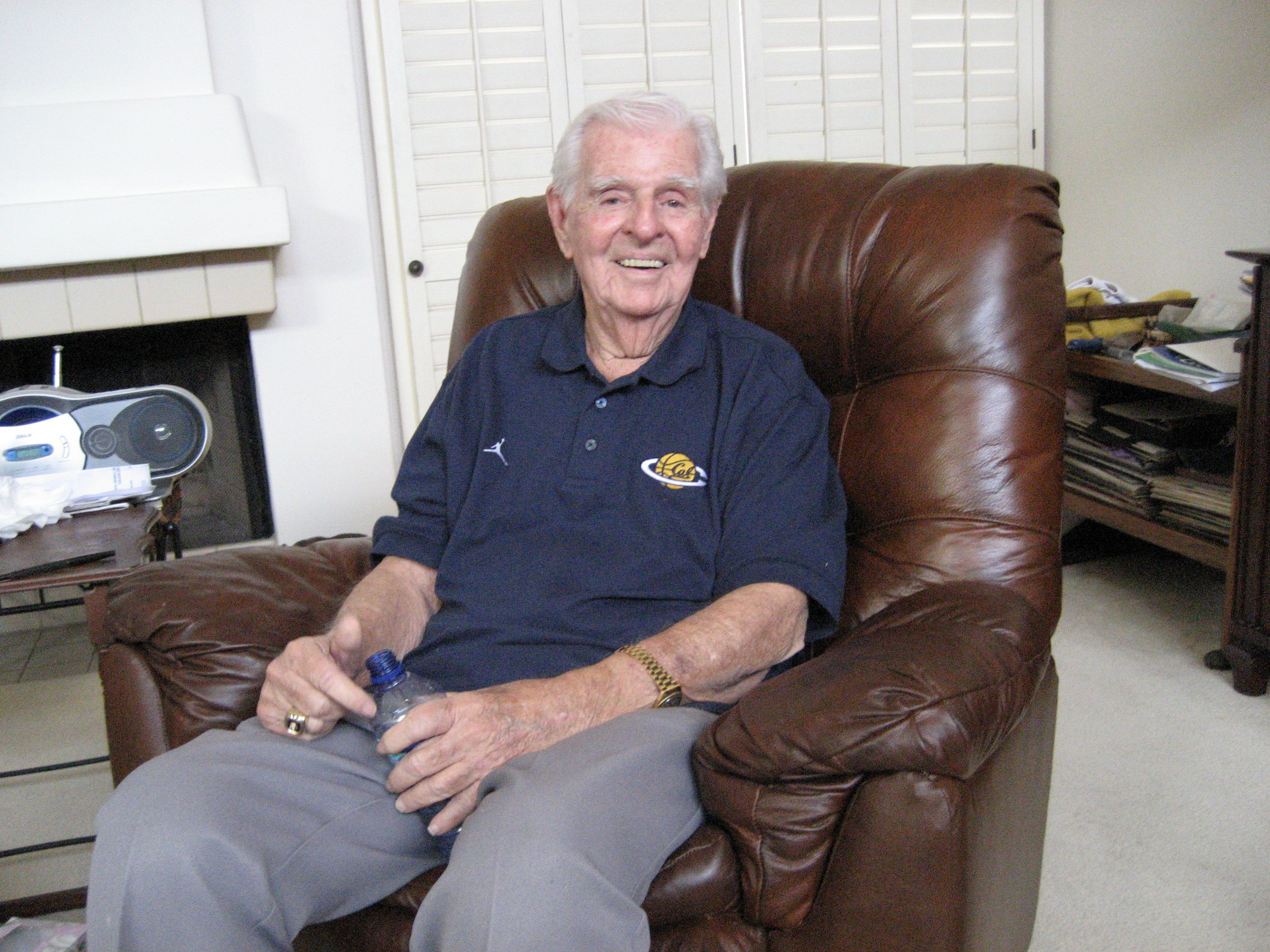
Pete Newell, California, 1960

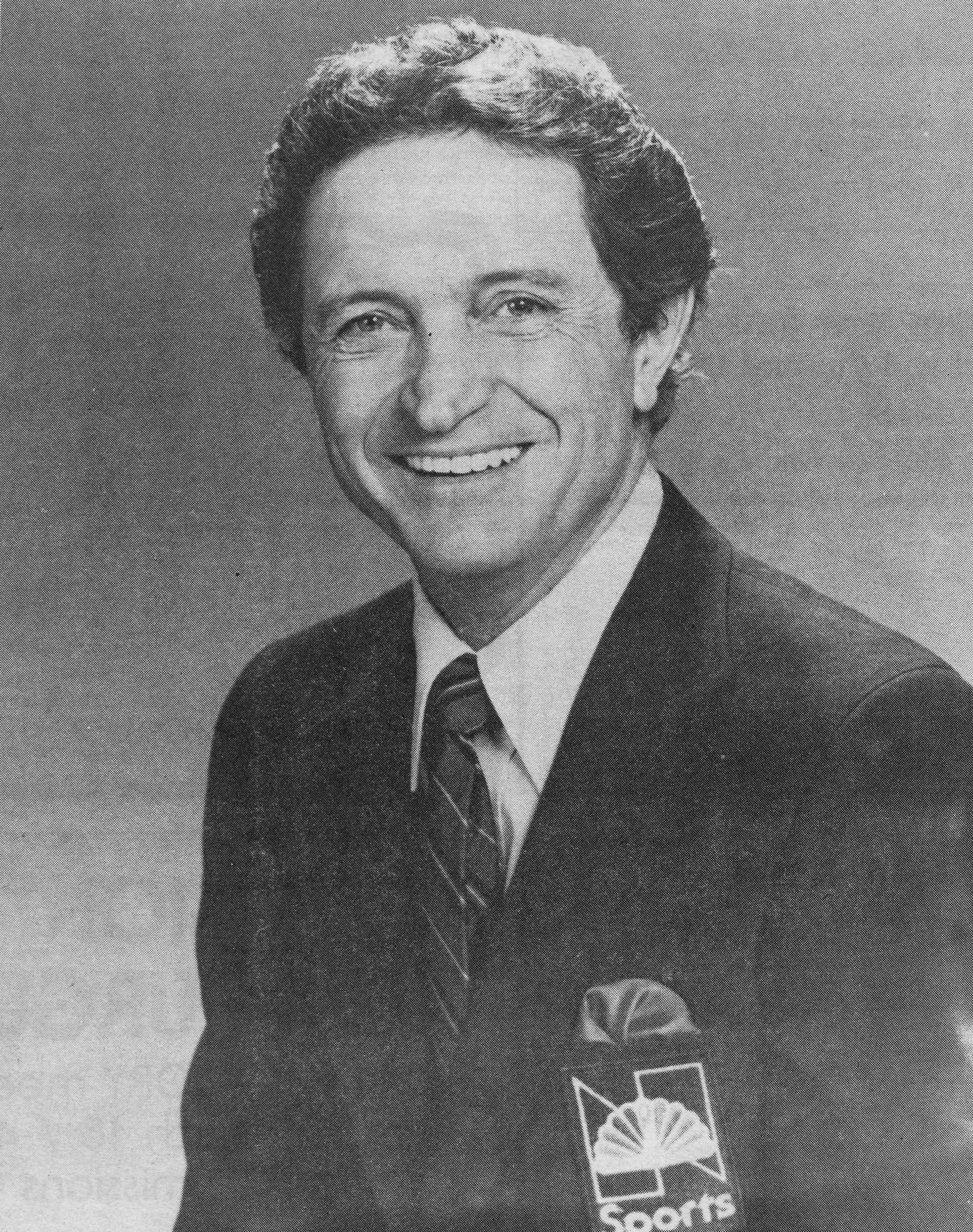
Al McGuire, Marquette, 1971

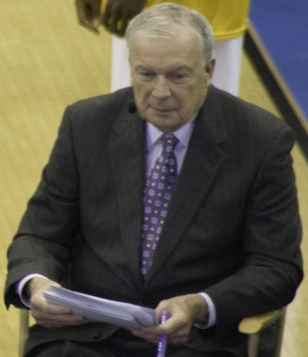
Digger Phelps, Notre Dame, 1974

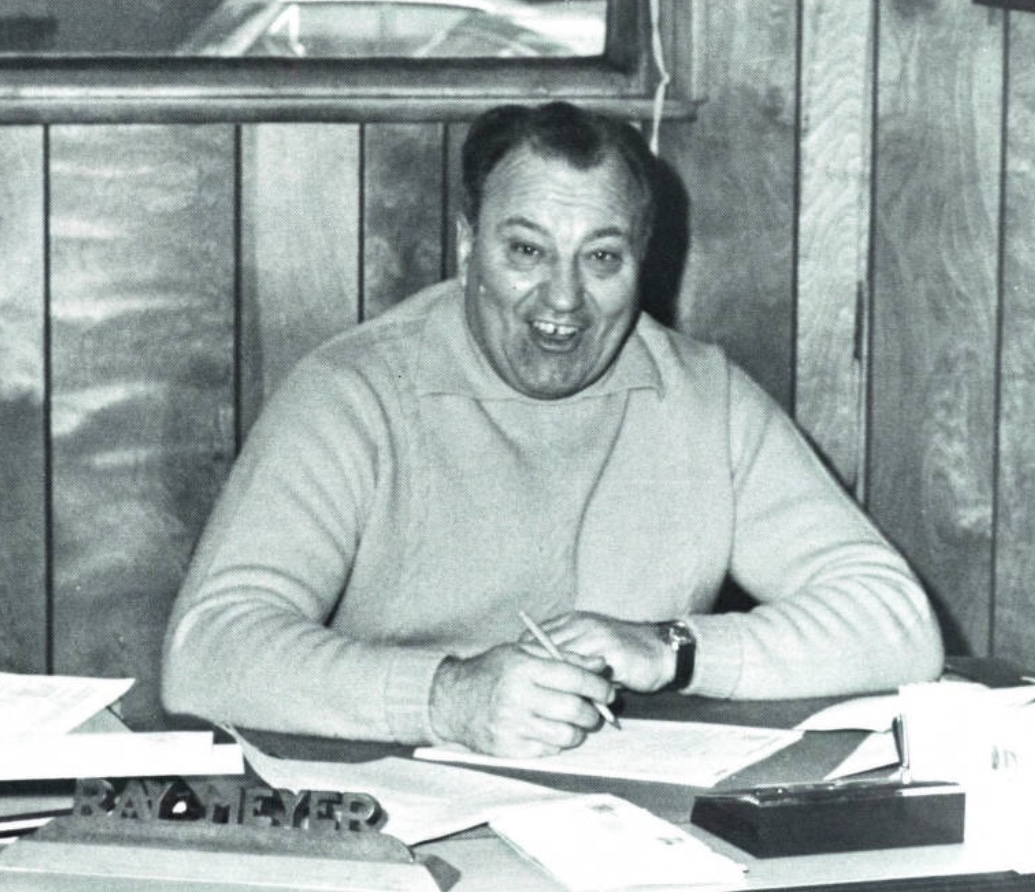
Ray Meyer, DePaul, 1980 and 1984

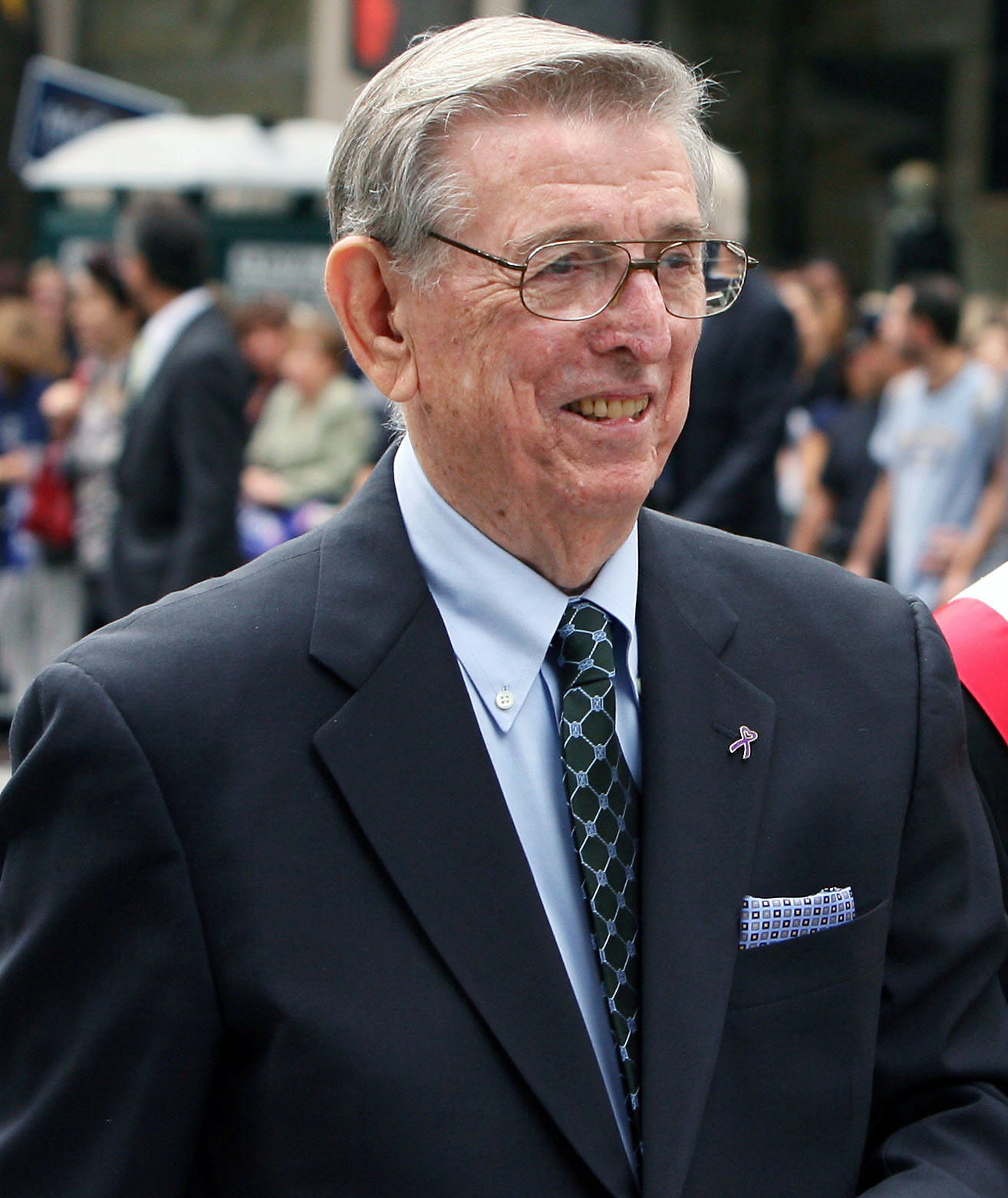
Lou Carnesecca, St. John's, 1985

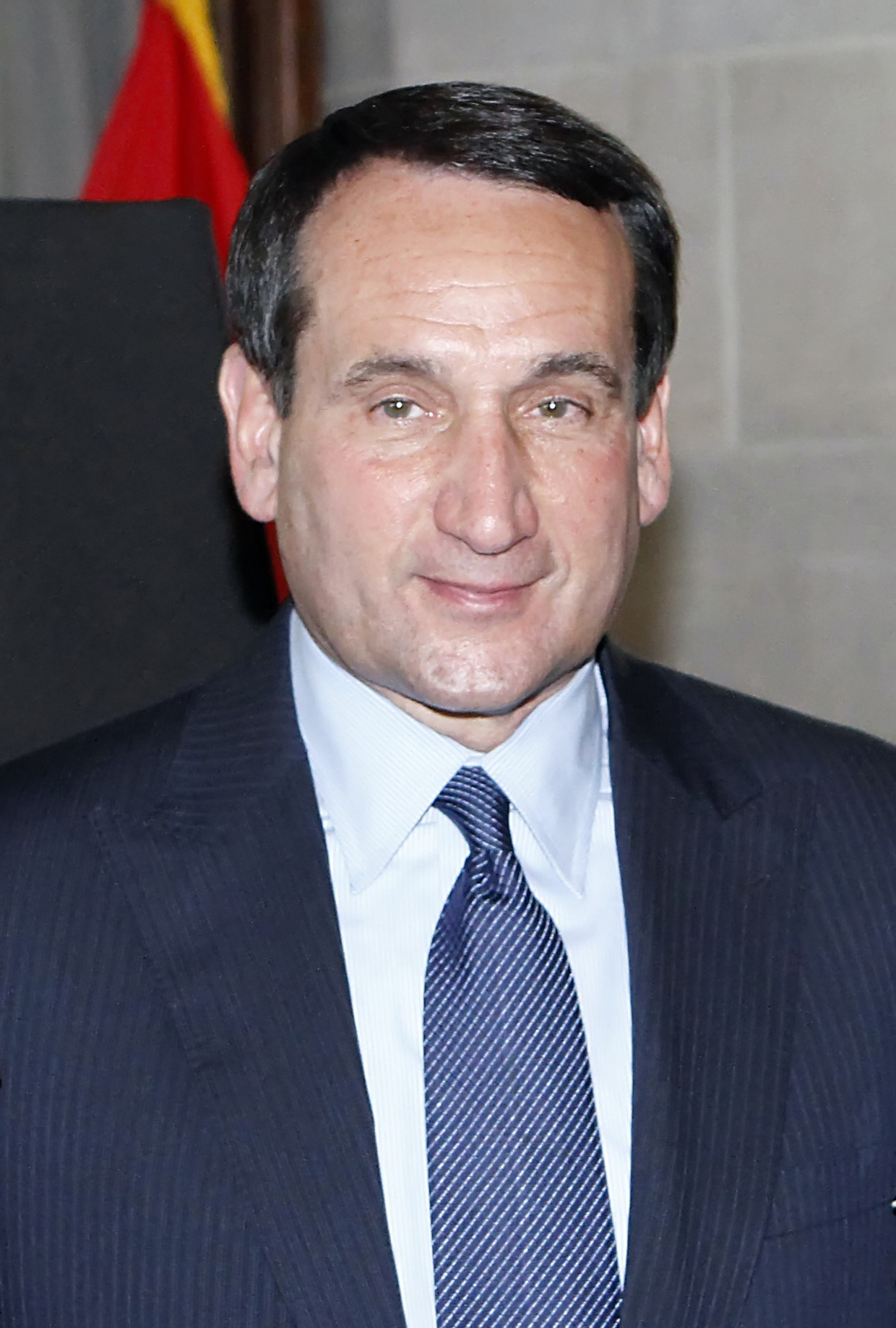
Mike Krzyzewski, Duke, 1986

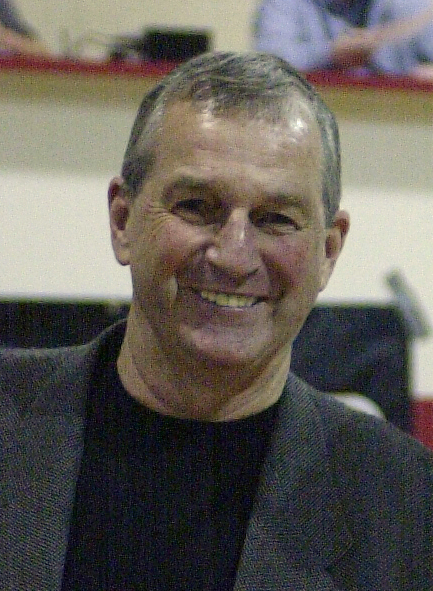
Jim Calhoun, UConn, 1990

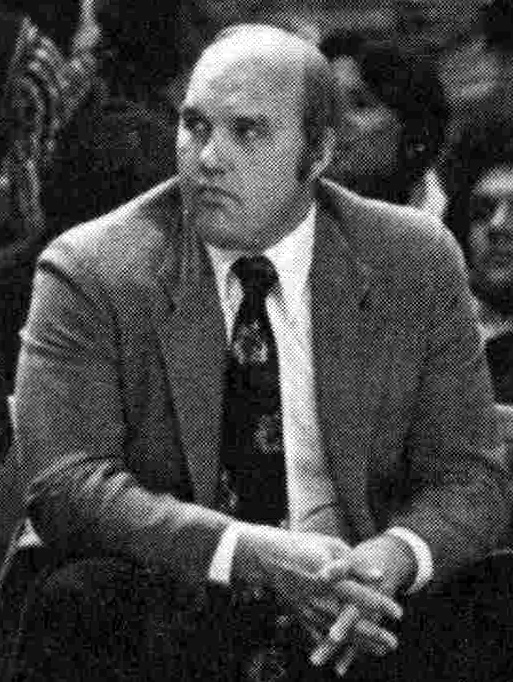
Rick Majerus, Utah, 1991

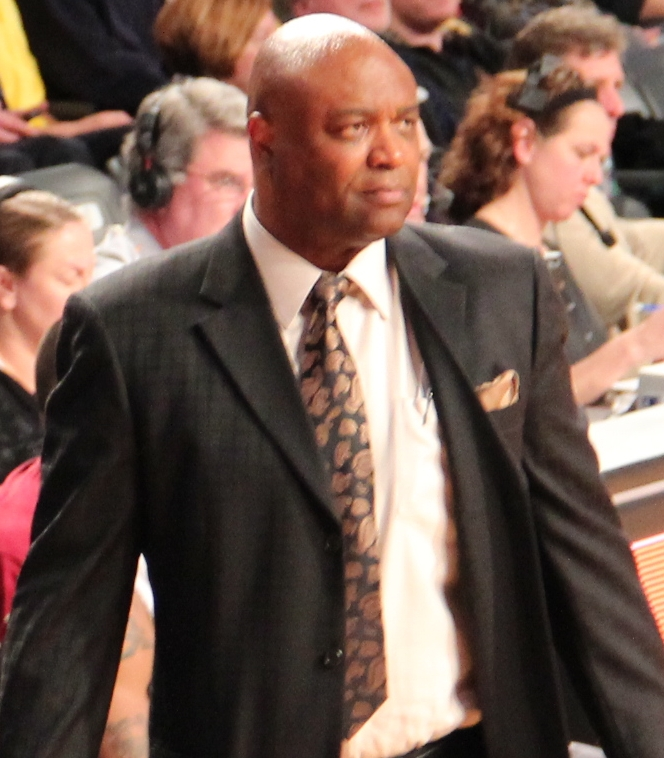
Leonard Hamilton, Miami (Florida), 1995

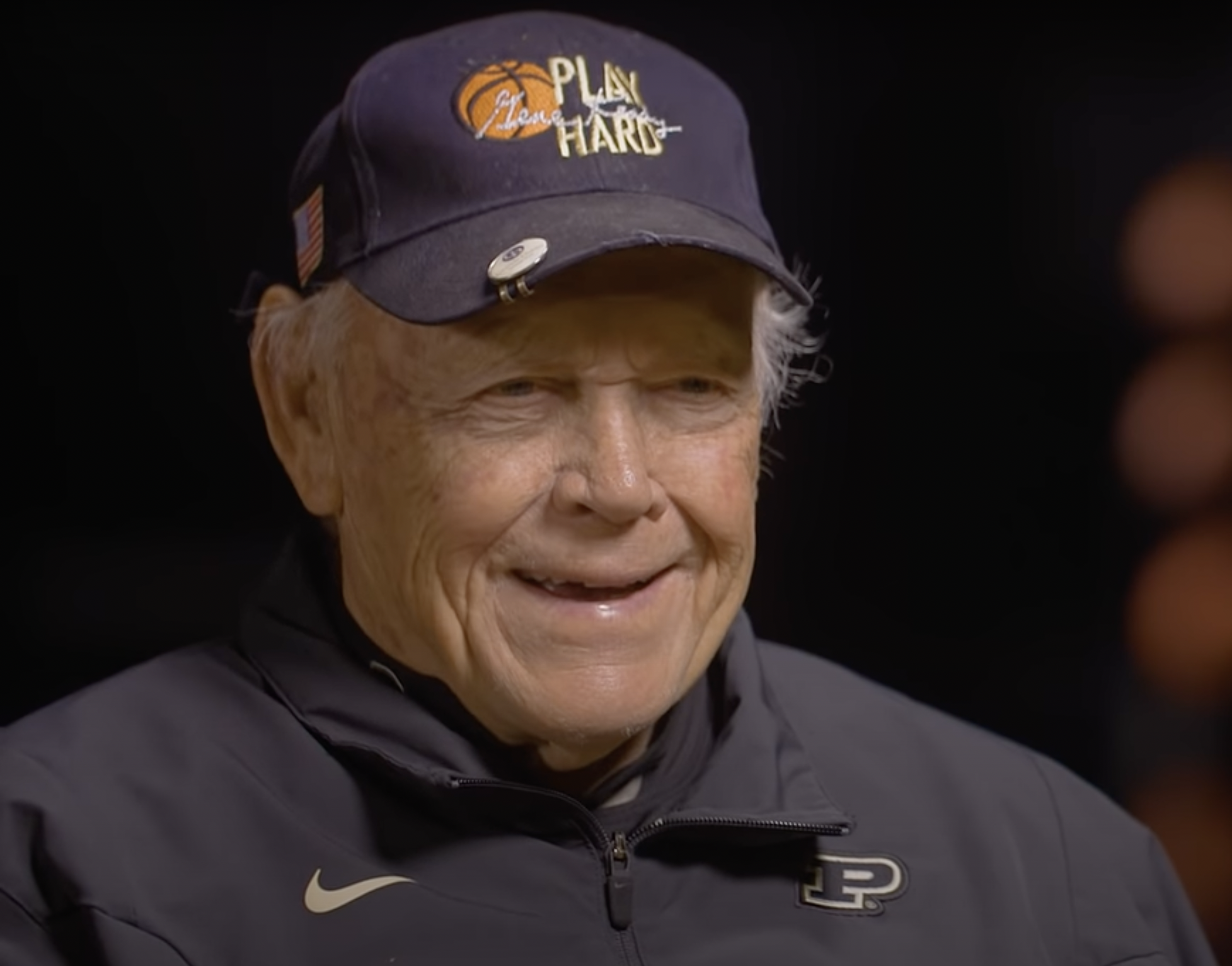
Gene Keady, Purdue, 1996

Season	Coach	School	W	L	W %	Finish	Reference
1951–52	Ken Loeffler	La Salle	25	7	.781	NIT champion	
1952–53	Branch McCracken	Indiana	23	3	.885	NCAA champion^{C}	
1953–54	Ken Loeffler (2)	La Salle	26	4	.867	NCAA champion^{C}	
1954–55	Phil Woolpert	San Francisco	28	1	.966	NCAA champion^{C}	
1955–56	Phil Woolpert (2)	San Francisco	29	0	1.000	NCAA champion^{C}	
1956–57	Frank McGuire	North Carolina	32	0	1.000	NCAA champion^{C}	
1957–58	Tex Winter	Kansas State	22	5	.815	NCAA Fourth Place	
1958–59	Adolph Rupp	Kentucky	24	3	.889	NCAA Sweet Sixteen	
1959–60	Pete Newell	California	28	2	.933	NCAA runners-up	
1960–61	Fred Taylor	Ohio State	27	1	.964	NCAA runners-up	
1961–62	Fred Taylor (2)	Ohio State	26	2	.929	NCAA runners-up	
1962–63	Ed Jucker	Cincinnati	26	2	.929	NCAA runners-up	
1963–64	John Wooden	UCLA	30	0	1.000	NCAA champion^{C}	
1964–65	Dave Strack	Michigan	24	4	.857	NCAA runners-up	
1965–66	Adolph Rupp (2)	Kentucky	27	2	.931	NCAA runners-up	
1966–67	John Wooden (2)	UCLA	30	0	1.000	NCAA champion^{C}	
1967–68	Guy Lewis	Houston	31	2	.939	NCAA Final Four	
1968–69	John Wooden (3)	UCLA	29	1	.967	NCAA champion^{C}	
1969–70	John Wooden (4)	UCLA	28	2	.933	NCAA champion^{C}	
1970–71	Al McGuire	Marquette	28	1	.966	NCAA Regional Third Place	
1971–72	John Wooden (5)	UCLA	30	0	1.000	NCAA champion^{C}	
1972–73	John Wooden (6)	UCLA	30	0	1.000	NCAA champion^{C}	
1973–74	Digger Phelps	Notre Dame	26	3	.897	NCAA Regional Third Place	
1974–75	Bob Knight	Indiana	31	1	.969	NCAA Elite Eight	
1975–76	Tom Young	Rutgers	31	2	.939	NCAA Final Four	
1976–77	Bob Gaillard	San Francisco	29	2	.935	NCAA first round^{[a]}	
1977–78	Eddie Sutton	Arkansas	32	4	.889	NCAA Final Four	
1978–79	Bill Hodges	Indiana State	33	1	.971	NCAA runners-up	
1979–80	Ray Meyer	DePaul	26	2	.929	NCAA second round	
1980–81	Ralph Miller	Oregon State	26	2	.929	NCAA second round	
1981–82	Norm Stewart	Missouri	27	4	.871	NCAA Sweet Sixteen	
1982–83	Jerry Tarkanian	UNLV	28	3	.903	NCAA second round	
1983–84	Ray Meyer (2)	DePaul	27	3	.900	NCAA Sweet Sixteen	
1984–85	Lou Carnesecca	St. John's	31	4	.886	NCAA Final Four	
1985–86	Mike Krzyzewski	Duke	37	3	.925	NCAA runners-up	
1986–87	John Thompson	Georgetown	29	5	.853	NCAA Elite Eight	
1987–88	John Chaney	Temple	32	2	.941	NCAA Elite Eight	
1988–89	Bob Knight (2)	Indiana	27	8	.771	NCAA Sweet Sixteen	
1989–90	Jim Calhoun	UConn	31	6	.838	NCAA Elite Eight	
1990–91	Rick Majerus	Utah	30	4	.882	NCAA Sweet Sixteen	
1991–92	Perry Clark	Tulane	22	9	.710	NCAA second round	
1992–93	Eddie Fogler	Vanderbilt	28	6	.824	NCAA Sweet Sixteen	
1993–94	Norm Stewart (2)	Missouri	28	4	.875	NCAA Elite Eight	
1994–95	Leonard Hamilton	Miami (Florida)	15	13	.536	NIT first round	
1995–96	Gene Keady	Purdue	26^{[b]}	6^{[b]}	.813^{[b]}	NCAA second round	

- ^{a} The NCAA men's tournament expanded beyond 32 teams starting with the 1979 tournament. For purposes of sorting the "Finish" column, San Francisco's 1976–77 exit in the first round (when there were still 32 participating teams) will be 32, not 64.
- ^{b} In 1999, the NCAA Division I Committee on Infractions ruled that Purdue had violated laws involving recruiting, extra benefits, and ethical conduct, as well as several secondary violations in the women's basketball program. Their 26–6 overall record (15–3 conference) retroactively forfeited 18 wins and vacated 2 games for using an ineligible player.
