= Ukiah High School =

Public secondary school in Ukiah, California (USA)

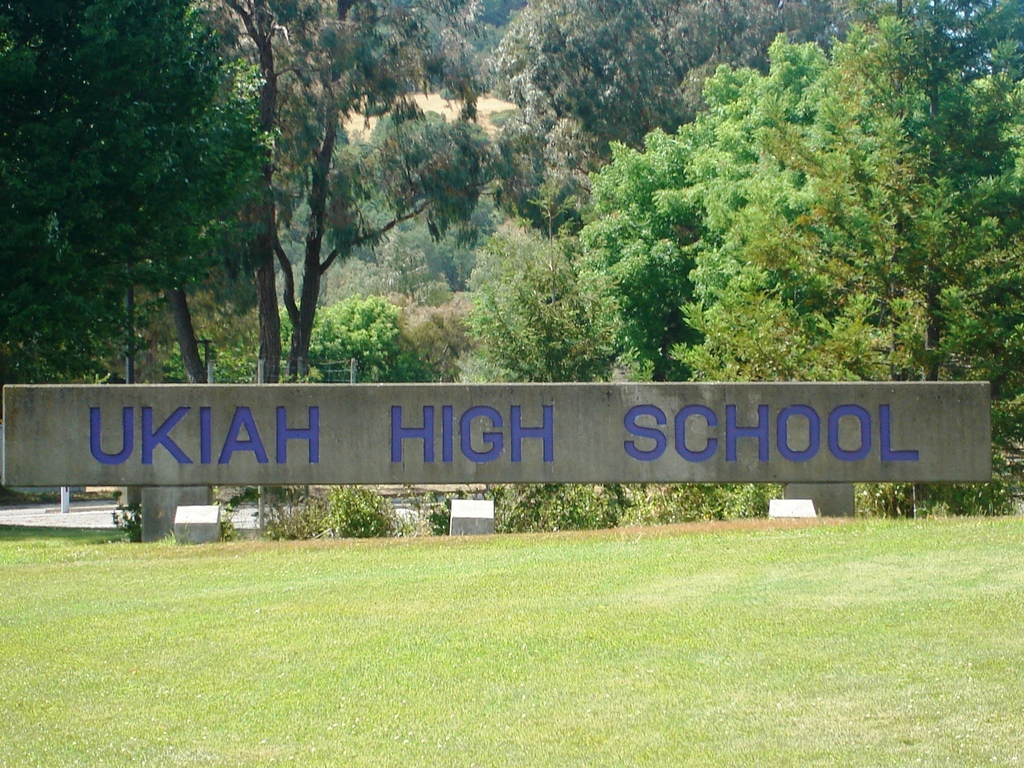
- Ukiah High School sign

Location
- 1000 Low Gap Road; Ukiah, Mendocino County, California 95482; United States
- Coordinates: 39.164°N 123.224°W

Information
- Other names: UHS; "Ukiahi"
- School type: Public, comprehensive high school
- Established: 1893; 133 years ago
- Status: Operating
- School district: Ukiah Unified School District
- NCES District ID: 0640300
- Educational authority: California Department of Education
- Oversight: Mendocino County Office of Education
- Superintendent: Debra Kubin
- School code: CDS 23-65615-2335024
- CEEB code: 053580
- NCES School ID: 064030006665
- Principal: Analese Alvarez
- Staff: 82.26 FTE
- Faculty: 82.26 (FTE) (2017-18)
- Grades: 9^{th} through 12^{th}
- Gender: Coeducational
- Enrollment: 1,778 (2023-24)
  - Grade 9: 494
  - Grade 10: 466
  - Grade 11: 423
  - Grade 12: 395
- Student to teacher ratio: 21.14:1
- Education system: California Common Core
- Schedule: 180 days/year Mon-Fri, August–June
- Hours in school day: 6 instructional + breaks/lunch
- Campus size: 60 acres (24 ha)
- Campus type: Suburban
- Colors: Purple and Gold
- Athletics conference: Calif. Interscholastic Federation; North Coast Section; Redwood Empire Conf.; North Bay League
- Mascot: Willy the Wildcat
- Nickname: Wildcats
- Accreditation: ACS WASC (2015-21)
- USNWR ranking: 685 / 2,494 in California (2019)
- National ranking: 4,774 / 17,245 (2019)
- SAT average: 1119 / 1600 (2018)
- Communities served: Calpella; Hopland; Redwood Valley; Talmage; Ukiah
- Feeder schools: Eagle Peak Middle School; Pomolita Middle School
- Graduates (2017): 281
- Pupil/counselor ratio: 330:1
- Website: www.ukiahhigh.uusd.net

Ukiah High School (also referred to as UHS or "Ukiahi") is the oldest public high school in Ukiah, California, the seat of Mendocino County. Established in 1893, it is the largest school by enrollment and the only four-year comprehensive high school in the Ukiah Unified School District. It serves all students in the ninth through twelfth grades from the incorporated city of Ukiah plus the four smaller, adjacent communities of Calpella, Hopland, Redwood Valley and Talmage and other rural residents of southeastern Mendocino County. The district's boundaries encompass a total area of 495 square miles (1,280 km^{2}) with a population of approximately 40,000.

== Campus ==
The school's current location, a campus built on 60 acres (24 ha) on Low Gap Road in the northwest portion of the city, opened for the 1978–79 academic year.

== Awards and recognition ==
The school was recognized as a California Distinguished School in 1988 and again in 2001.

== Notable alumni ==
- Kelvin Chapman, MLB second baseman (New York Mets 1979-85)
- Shiloh Fernandez, actor
- Holly Near, actress and songwriter
- Harold L. "Hal" Perry ('52), college basketball player for the USF Dons, 1952-56 (1955 & 1956 NCAA Men's Division I National Champions)
- Rick Warren, minister and author
- Members of the band AFI (A Fire Inside):
  - Adam Carson
  - Davey Havok
  - Jade Puget
