= Ross Giudice =

American basketball player and coach (1924–2017)

Biographical details
- Born: 1924; Detroit, Michigan, U.S.
- Died: July 14, 2017 (aged 93); Sonoma County, California, U.S.

Playing career
- 1945–1950: San Francisco
- Position: Shooting guard / small forward

Coaching career (HC unless noted)
- 1950–1959: San Francisco (assistant)
- 1959–1960: San Francisco

Head coaching record
- Overall: 9–16 (.360)

Ross Giudice (1924 – July 14, 2017) was an American college basketball coach at the University of San Francisco (USF). He is best remembered as the assistant coach for the Dons' 1955 and 1956 NCAA championship teams.

Giudice was born in Detroit and moved to San Francisco as a child. After graduating from George Washington High School, he joined the United States Navy and fought in World War II on the USS California. Following his time in the service, he enrolled at USF and was a member of the school's basketball team. He played for the Dons from 1945 to 1950 and was a member of the school's 1949 National Invitation Tournament championship team, sinking a crucial free throw to clinch the title.

When Phil Woolpert was hired as head coach at USF in 1950, Giudice was named his lone assistant and coach of the freshman team. In this capacity, Giudice was responsible for developing incoming freshmen and preparing them for the varsity team the following year. Two of Giudice's notable pupils we future Hall of Fame players K. C. Jones and Bill Russell. These two players served as the foundation for USF's two national championship teams. Years later, Russell would credit Giudice with playing a crucial role in his development as a player.

When Woolpert resigned in 1959, Giudice took over as head coach of the Dons. However, he was not interested in the head job and after one season he left coaching for good to go into the furniture business.

Giudice died on July 14, 2017, at an assisted-living facility in Sonoma County, California.

== Head coaching record ==
Record table
Season	Team	Overall	Conference	Standing	Postseason
San Francisco Dons (West Coast Athletic Conference) (1959–1960)
1959–60	San Francisco	9–16	5–7	5th	
San Francisco:		9–16 (.360)	5–7 (.417)		
Total:		9–16 (.360)			
