= Robert Ames =

Robert Ames may refer to:

- Robert Ames (actor) (1889–1931), American stage and film actor
- Robert Ames (CIA official) (1934–1983), American CIA analyst, a/k/a Bob Ames
- Robert Ames (conductor) (born 1985), English conductor and violist
