= Jerry Mullen =

American basketball player (1933–1979)

Personal information
- Born: November 23, 1933 Berkeley, California
- Died: September, 1979 (aged 45)
- Listed height: 6 ft 5 in (1.96 m)
- Listed weight: 200 lb (91 kg)

Career information
- High school: St. Mary's (Berkeley, California)
- College: San Francisco (1951–1955)
- NBA draft: 1955: 2nd round, 11th overall pick
- Drafted by: New York Knicks
- Playing career: 1955–1961
- Position: Forward
- Number: 14

Career history
- 1955–1961: Wichita Vickers

Career highlights
- AP honorable mention All-American (1955); NCAA champion (1955); AAU champion (1959)
- Stats at Basketball Reference

Jerry Mullen (November 23, 1933 – September, 1979) was an American basketball player. He was an All-American at the University of San Francisco and a second round draft pick of the New York Knicks.

Mullen, a 6'5 forward from St. Mary's College High School in Berkeley, California, played college basketball at the University of San Francisco from 1951 to 1955. At USF, Mullen teamed with future Hall of Fame center Bill Russell in the frontcourt to bring home the first of the Dons' consecutive national titles in 1955. Mullen was a key player for the team, averaging 13.6 points and 7.1 rebounds per game and earning AP honorable mention All-America honors that year. He was also named to the All-Western Regional team in the tournament.

After graduating from USF, Mullen was drafted in the second round (13th pick overall) of the 1955 NBA draft by the New York Knicks. However, Mullen chose instead to continue his basketball career in the Amateur Athletic Union, playing for the Wichita Vickers for six seasons. The Vickers won the AAU title in 1959 with Mullen playing a key reserve role.

After his AAU playing days were over, Jerry Mullen returned to his home state of California for a career in sales and consulting. He died in September 1979 at the age of 45.
