= 1954–55 San Francisco Dons men's basketball team =

American college basketball season

1954–55 San Francisco Dons men's basketball
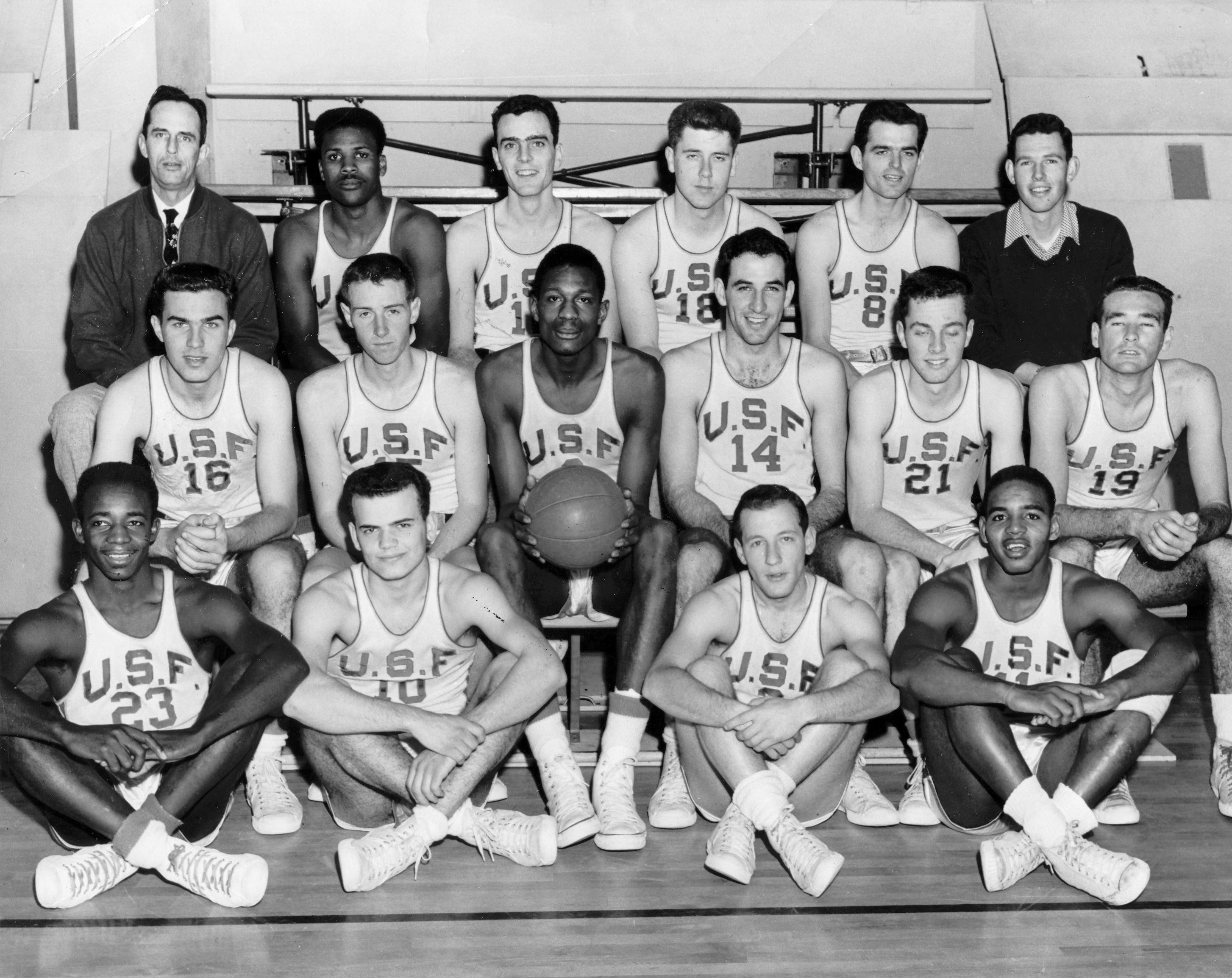

NCAA tournament National champions NCAA regular season champions CBA regular season champions

National Championship Game, W 77–63 vs. La Salle
- Conference: California Basketball Association

Ranking
- Coaches: No. 1
- AP: No. 1
- Record: 28–1 (12–0 CBA)
- Head coach: Phil Woolpert (5th season)
- Assistant coach: Ross Giudice
- Home arena: Kezar Pavilion

1954–55 California Basketball Association men's basketball standings
	Conf.				Overall
Team	W		L	PCT	W		L	PCT
No. 1 San Francisco	12	–	0	1.000	28	–	1	.966
San Jose State	7	–	5	.583	16	–	9	.640
Santa Clara	6	–	6	.500	13	–	11	.542
Pacific	4	–	8	.333	11	–	15	.423
Saint Mary's	1	–	11	.083	6	–	19	.240
Rankings from AP Poll

The 1954–55 San Francisco Dons men's basketball team represented the University of San Francisco in NCAA competition in the 1954–55 season. The Dons, a member of the California Basketball Association (now known as the West Coast Conference), finished the season ranked #1 in the nation.

== Roster ==
1954–55 San Francisco Dons men's basketball team
Players
Coaches

Pos.	#	Name	Height	Weight	Year	Hometown
G	4	K. C. Jones	6 ft 1 in (1.85 m)	195 lb (88 kg)	Jr	San Francisco, California
C	6	Bill Russell	6 ft 9 in (2.06 m)	210 lb (95 kg)	Jr	Oakland, California
F	14	Jerry Mullen	6 ft 5 in (1.96 m)	195 lb (88 kg)	Sr	Berkeley, California
G	23	Hal Perry	5 ft 10 in (1.78 m)	—	Jr	Ukiah, California

Head coach

- Phil Woolpert (Loyola Marymount)

Assistant coach(es)

- Ross Giudice (San Francisco)

Legend

- (C) Team captain
- (S) Suspended
- (I) Ineligible
- (W) Walk-on
- Injured
- Current redshirt

== Schedule and results ==
Date time, TV	Rank^{#}	Opponent^{#}	Result	Record	High points	High rebounds	High assists	Site city, state
Regular Season
Dec 2, 1955*		Chico State	W 70–39	1–0	–	–	–	Kezar Pavilion; San Francisco, California
Dec 10, 1954*		at Loyola (Los Angeles)	W 54–45	2–0	–	–	–	Alumni Memorial Gymnasium; Los Angeles, California
Dec 11, 1954*		at No. 13 UCLA	L 40–47	2–1	–	–	–	UCLA Men's Gymnasium; Los Angeles, California
Dec 17, 1954*		Oregon State	W 60–34	3–1	–	–	–	Cow Palace; Daly City, California
Dec 18, 1954*		No. 8 UCLA	W 56–44	4–1	–	–	–	Cow Palace; Daly City, California
Dec 20, 1954*		vs. No. 17 Wichita State; All-College Tournament	W 94–75	5–1	–	–	–	Oklahoma City Municipal Auditorium; Oklahoma City, Oklahoma
Dec 21, 1954*	No. 17	at Oklahoma City; All-College Tournament	W 75–51	6–1	–	–	–	Oklahoma City Municipal Auditorium; Oklahoma City, Oklahoma
Dec 22, 1954*	No. 17	vs. No. 8 George Washington; All-College Tournament	W 73–57	7–1	–	–	–	Oklahoma City Municipal Auditorium; Oklahoma City, Oklahoma
Dec 29, 1954*	No. 5	San Diego State	W 70–56	8–1	–	–	–	Kezar Pavilion; San Francisco, California
Jan 4, 1955	No. 5	at Saint Mary's	W 51–37	9–1 (1–0)	–	–	–	Madigan Gymnasium; Moraga, California
Jan 10, 1955	No. 5	San Jose State	W 56–30	10–1 (2–0)	–	–	–	Kezar Pavilion; San Francisco, California
Jan 12, 1955	No. 5	at Santa Clara	W 54–44	11–1 (3–0)	–	–	–	Oakland, California
Jan 14, 1955	No. 5	Pacific	W 62–49	12–1 (4–0)	12 – Tied	–	–	Kezar Pavilion; San Francisco, California
Jan 28, 1955*	No. 2	Stanford	W 76–60	13–1	–	–	–	Kezar Pavilion; San Francisco, California
Jan 29, 1955*	No. 2	California	W 84–62	14–1	–	–	–	Kezar Pavilion; San Francisco, California
Feb 4, 1955*	No. 2	Loyola (Los Angeles)	W 65–55	15–1	–	–	–	Kezar Pavilion; San Francisco, California
Feb 5, 1955	No. 2	Saint Mary's	W 69–48	16–1 (5–0)	–	–	–	Kezar Pavilion; San Francisco, California
Feb 9, 1955	No. 1	at Pacific	W 72–52	17–1 (6–0)	–	–	–	Pacific Pavilion; Stockton, California
Feb 11, 1955	No. 1	at San Jose State	W 59–49	18–1 (7–0)	–	–	–	Spartan Gym; San Jose, California
Feb 14, 1955	No. 1	at Santa Clara	W 66–52	19–1 (8–0)	31 – Russell	–	–	San Jose Civic Auditorium; San Jose, California
Feb 16, 1955	No. 1	at Saint Mary's	W 65–57	20–1 (9–0)	–	–	–	Madigan Gymnasium; Moraga, California
Feb 23, 1955	No. 1	at San Jose State	W 64–40	21–1 (10–0)	–	–	–	Spartan Gym; San Jose, California
Feb 26, 1955	No. 1	Pacific	W 67–57	22–1 (11–0)	–	–	–	Kezar Pavilion; San Francisco, California
Mar 2, 1955	No. 1	Santa Clara	W 73–61	23–1 (12–0)	–	–	–	Kezar Pavilion; San Francisco, California
NCAA Tournament
Mar 8, 1955*	No. 1	vs. West Texas A&M; First round	W 89–66	24–1	29 – Russell	11 – Tied	–	Cow Palace; Daly City, California
Mar 11, 1955*	No. 1	vs. No. 7 Utah; West Regional semifinal	W 78–59	25–1	24 – Mullen	9 – Russell	–	Oregon State Coliseum; Corvallis, Oregon
Mar 12, 1955*	No. 1	vs. No. 10 Oregon State; West Regional Final	W 57–56	26–1	29 – Russell	16 – Russell	–	Oregon State Coliseum; Corvallis, Oregon
Mar 18, 1955*	No. 1	vs. No. 15 Colorado; National semifinal	W 62–50	27–1	24 – Russell	9 – Russell	–	Municipal Auditorium; Kansas City, Missouri
Mar 19, 1955*	No. 1	vs. No. 3 La Salle; National Championship Game	W 77–63	28–1	24 – Jones	25 – Russell	–	Municipal Auditorium; Kansas City, Missouri
*Non-conference game. ^{#}Rankings from AP Poll. (#) Tournament seedings in parentheses. W=West. All times are in Pacific Time.

== Rankings ==
Ranking movements Legend: ██ Increase in ranking ██ Decrease in ranking — = Not ranked
	Week													
Poll	1	2	3	4	5	6	7	8	9	10	11	12	13	Final
AP	—	—	17	5	5	5	3	2	2	1	1	1	1	1
Coaches	—	—	—	6	5	5	4	3	2	1	1	1	1	1

== Awards and honors ==
- Bill Russell, First Team All-America selection

== Team players drafted into the NBA ==
Round	Pick	Player	NBA club
2	11	Jerry Mullen	New York Knicks
10	76	K. C. Jones	Minneapolis Lakers
