= 1954–55 La Salle Explorers men's basketball team =

American college basketball season

1954–55 La Salle Explorers men's basketball

NCAA tournament, Runner-up

National Championship Game, L 63-77 vs. San Francisco
- Conference: Independent

Ranking
- Coaches: No. 3
- AP: No. 3
- Record: 26–5
- Head coach: Ken Loeffler

== Season summary ==
Robert Ames, later a CIA official killed in the 1983 bombing of the United States embassy in Beirut, Lebanon, was a member of the 1954–55 Explorers.

== NCAA tournament ==
- East
  - La Salle 95, West Virginia 61
  - La Salle 73, Princeton 46
  - La Salle 99, Canisius College 64
- Final Four
  - La Salle 76, Iowa 73
  - San Francisco 77, La Salle 63

== Team players drafted into the NBA ==
Round	Pick	Player	NBA club
1	3	Tom Gola	Philadelphia Warriors
