= Alexander Shaw (cricketer) =

English cricketer

Alexander Armstrong Shaw (7 September 1907 – 19 July 1945) was an English cricketer. He was a right-handed batsman and wicket-keeper. He was born in Shardlow and died in New Delhi.

Shaw's first-class debut was playing for Sussex against Cambridge University. In Shaw's first innings in the field, he caught three batsmen and stumped three others.

Shaw's second and final first-class match was eight years later, playing for Bengal. Shaw scored just a single run in the two innings in which he batted.
