= Alex Shaw (soccer) =

Canadian soccer player

Personal information
- Date of birth: 22 November 1924
- Place of birth: Glasgow, Scotland
- Date of death: 4 January 2013 (aged 88)
- Place of death: Parry Sound, Ontario, Canada
- Position: Inside forward

Senior career*
Years	Team	Apps	(Gls)
- Strathclyde
1949–1951	Dundee United	12	(5)
1952–1955	Toronto St. Andrews		

International career
1957	Canada	1	(0)
- * Club domestic league appearances and goals

Alex Shaw (22 November 1924 – 4 January 2013) was a Canadian international soccer player.

== Career ==
After playing with Strathclyde, Shaw signed with Dundee United in 1949, where he played for two seasons, appearing in 12 matches league matches, scoring five goals. In 1952, he played in the National Soccer League with Toronto St. Andrews. He later played with Toronto Thistle and coached Toronto Ulster United.

He made his debut for the Canada men's national soccer team on 6 July 1957 against the United States in a World Cup qualifier match. He died on 4 January 2013 in Perry Sound, Ontario.
