= Robert Ames (CIA official) =

American CIA officer (1934–1983)

Robert Clayton Ames
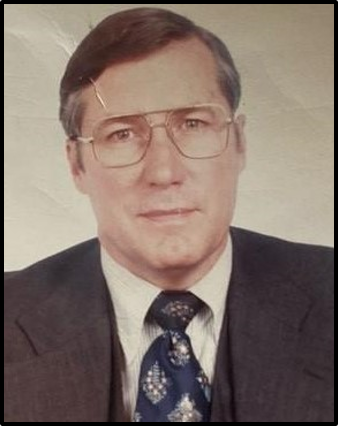
- Born: March 6, 1934; Philadelphia, Pennsylvania, United States
- Died: April 18, 1983 (aged 49); Beirut, Lebanon
- Resting place: Arlington National Cemetery
- Occupations: Near East Director, Central Intelligence Agency

Robert Clayton Ames (March 6, 1934 – April 18, 1983) was an operations officer and Near East specialist for the Central Intelligence Agency. He was killed in the 1983 United States embassy bombing in Beirut.

== Early life ==
Raised in Philadelphia, the son of a steelworker, Ames was a 1956 graduate of La Salle University. While at La Salle, he was a member of the La Salle basketball team which won the NCAA championship in 1954 and was runner-up in 1955.

== Career ==
In 1956, he joined the US Army in signals intelligence and assigned to duty in Ethiopia. On visits to Cairo and Jerusalem, Ames became interested in the Middle East and learned Arabic. In 1960, he joined the Central Intelligence Agency (CIA), specializing in the Middle East. Over his twenty three year CIA career, Ames was posted in Sana'a, South Yemen; Beirut, Lebanon; Tehran, Iran and Kuwait City, Kuwait.

According to Ames' biographer Kai Bird, Ames rose to become America's most influential intelligence officer in the Middle East due to his connections with Palestinian militancy figures, including Ali Hassan Salameh, the head of Black September, a link which is corroborated by Jack O'Connell, the CIA station chief in Amman (1963-71). The backchannel with Yasir Arafat's Palestine Liberation Organization (PLO) was politically risky, when the PLO was viewed as a terrorist organization in Washington.

He rose to become the CIA's chief analyst for the Middle East at CIA headquarters, regularly briefing President Ronald Reagan. He was involved in the development of Operation Eagle Claw, a failed rescue attempt during the Iran hostage crisis.

=== Death ===
Ames was killed on April 18, 1983, when a suicide bomber detonated a bomb at the United States embassy in Beirut. A total of 63 people were killed in the explosion, including Ames, the CIA Lebanon station chief and his deputy, as well as six other CIA officers and eight other Americans. CIA Director William Casey described Ames as "the closest thing to an irreplaceable man".

US President Ronald Reagan and his wife, Nancy Reagan, attended the ceremony marking the arrival of the victims’ coffins at Andrews Air Force Base. A memorial service for them, held at Washington National Cathedral, was attended by three thousand people. Ames is buried at Arlington National Cemetery.

After his death, Ames was selected as one of CIA's first Trailblazers.

== Personal life ==
He and his wife, Yvonne, had six children. Only after his death did Ames' children learn he was a spy.

He is the uncle of former Major League Baseball pitcher Mark Gubicza.
