= Alex Shaw (basketball) =

American basketball player and coach

Biographical details
- Born: July 8, 1907; Detroit, Michigan, U.S.
- Died: November 29, 2009 (aged 102); North Adams, Massachusetts, U.S.

Playing career
- 1929–1932: Michigan

Coaching career (HC unless noted)
- 1934–1949: Ann Arbor HS
- 1949–1973: Williams

Head coaching record
- Overall: 312–171
- Tournaments: 0–1 (NCAA D-I); 2–3 (NCAA D-II)

Accomplishments and honors

Championships
- NCAA Division II Regional Champions (1961)

Awards
- NABC Merit Award (1970)

Alex Shaw (July 8, 1907 – November 29, 2009) was an American college men's basketball coach. He was the head coach of the Williams College Ephs from 1949 to 1973. He coached Williams to a 312–171 record, making three NCAA tournament appearances, one Division I appearance (1955) and two Division II appearances (1959 and 1961). Shaw also served as an assistant football coach at Williams. He played his college basketball at Michigan and coached at Ann Arbor High School from 1934 until he took the job at Williams.
