= Phil Woolpert =

American basketball coach (1915–1987)

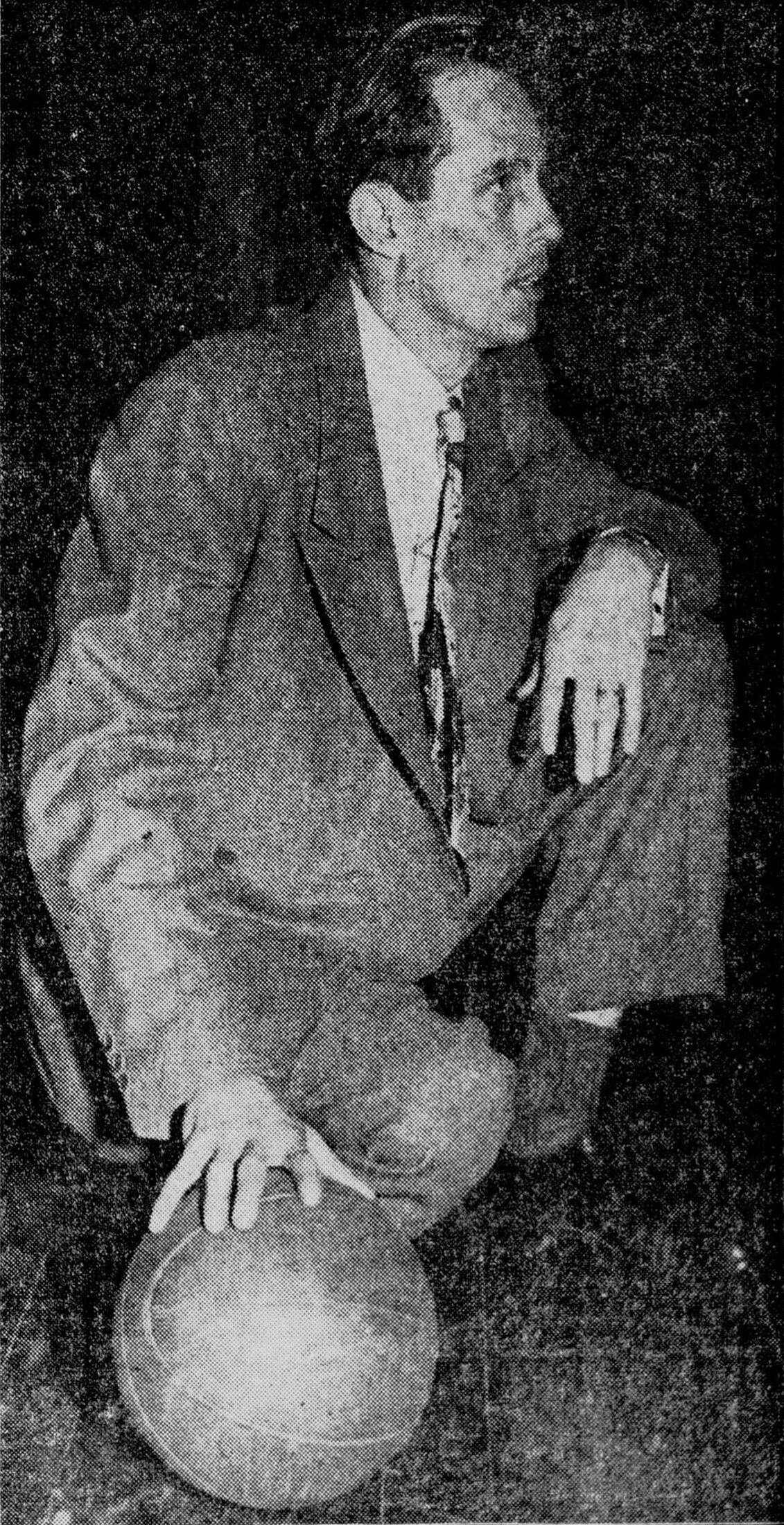
- Woolpert with San Francisco circa 1954

Biographical details
- Born: December 15, 1915; Danville, Kentucky, U.S.
- Died: May 5, 1987 (aged 71); Sequim, Washington, U.S.
- Education: Loyola University (CA), 1940; Los Angeles Junior College

Playing career
- 1936–1940: Loyola (CA)

Coaching career (HC unless noted)
- 1946–1950: St. Ignatius Prep
- 1950–1959: San Francisco
- 1961–1962: San Francisco Saints (asst.)
- 1962–1969: San Diego

Administrative career (AD unless noted)
- 1950–1959: San Francisco
- 1962–1969: San Diego

Head coaching record
- Overall: 243–168 (college); 63–29 (high school)
- Tournaments: 13–2 (NCAA DI); 0–2 (NCAA DII)

Accomplishments and honors

Championships
- 2 NCAA tournament (1955, 1956); 4 CBA/WCAC regular season (1955–1958)

Awards
- 2× UPI Coach of the Year (1955, 1956); 4× CBA/WCAC Coach of the Year (1955–1958)
- Basketball Hall of Fame; Inducted in 1992 (profile)
- College Basketball Hall of Fame; Inducted in 2006

Philipp D. Woolpert (December 15, 1915 – May 5, 1987) was an American basketball coach, best known as the head coach of the University of San Francisco Dons in the 1950s. He led them to consecutive national championships in 1955 and 1956.

== Biography ==
Born in Danville, Kentucky, Woolpert was raised in Los Angeles, graduating from Manual Arts High School in 1933, in the depths of the Great Depression. He attended L.A. Junior College and Loyola University, where he played basketball for three years, was initiated into the Alpha Delta Gamma fraternity, and graduated in 1940 with a degree in political science.

In 1946, Woolpert was hired as basketball coach for St. Ignatius College Preparatory in San Francisco, where he posted a 63–29 (.685) record in his four years as coach. Upon Pete Newell's departure for Michigan State University, the University of San Francisco hired Woolpert to succeed Newell. He assumed both the posts of men's basketball coach and athletic director.

During his tenure at USF, Woolpert posted a 153–78 (.662) record, including a 60-game win streak that at the time was the longest in college basketball, surpassed later by John Wooden's 88 straight wins at UCLA. Woolpert's teams, anchored by Bill Russell, K. C. Jones, Gene Brown, and Mike Farmer, were known for their defense and held opponents below 60 points on 47 different occasions. USF won the NCAA tournament in 1955 and 1956, and finished third in 1957. At the time the youngest college basketball coach to win a national championship, Woolpert also won Coach of the Year honors in 1955 and 1956.

After briefly coaching the San Francisco Saints of the American Basketball League, Woolpert returned to the college ranks in 1962, this time with the University of San Diego. While at USD, Woolpert posted a 90–90 record and served as both men's basketball coach and athletic director.

Woolpert retired from coaching in 1969, and later settled down on the Olympic Peninsula in Washington and became a school bus driver in Sequim. He died of lung cancer at age 71 at his home in 1987.

Woolpert's son Paul was the assistant coach of the G-League South Bay Lakers.

== Head coaching record ==
=== College ===
Record table
Season	Team	Overall	Conference	Standing	Postseason
San Francisco Dons (Independent) (1950–1952)
1950–51	San Francisco	9–17			
1951–52	San Francisco	11–13			
San Francisco Dons (California Basketball Association / West Coast Athletic Conference) (1952–1959)
1952–53	San Francisco	10–11	6–2	2nd	
1953–54	San Francisco	14–7	8–4	2nd	
1954–55	San Francisco	28–1	12–0	1st	NCAA Champion
1955–56	San Francisco	29–0	14–0	1st	NCAA Champion
1956–57	San Francisco	21–7	12–2	1st	NCAA University Division Third Place
1957–58	San Francisco	25–2	12–0	1st	NCAA University Division Regional Semifinals
1958–59	San Francisco	6–20	3–9	6th	
San Francisco:		153–78 (.662)	67–17 (.785)		
San Diego Toreros (Independent) (1962–1969)
1962–63	San Diego	6–19			
1963–64	San Diego	13–13			
1964–65	San Diego	15–11			
1965–66	San Diego	17–11			NCAA College Division Regional Semifinals
1966–67	San Diego	14–11			
1967–68	San Diego	15–10			
1968–69	San Diego	10–15			
San Diego:		90–90 (.500)			
Total:		243–168 (.591)			
National champion Postseason invitational champion Conference regular season champion Conference regular season and conference tournament champion Division regular season champion Division regular season and conference tournament champion Conference tournament champion

== See also ==
- List of NCAA Division I Men's Final Four appearances by coach
