= 1955 NCAA basketball tournament =

Edition of USA college basketball tournament

- Season: 1954–55
- Teams: 24
- Finals site: Municipal Auditorium, Kansas City, Missouri
- Champions: San Francisco Dons (1st title, 1st title game, 1st Final Four)
- Runner-up: La Salle Explorers (2nd title game, 2nd Final Four)
- Semifinalists: Colorado Buffaloes (2nd Final Four); Iowa Hawkeyes (1st Final Four)
- Winning coach: Phil Woolpert (1st title)
- MOP: Bill Russell (San Francisco)
- Attendance: 116,983
- Top scorer: Bill Russell (San Francisco) (118 points)

The 1955 NCAA basketball tournament involved 24 schools playing in single-elimination play to determine the national champion of men's NCAA Division I college basketball. The 17th annual edition of the tournament began on March 8, 1955, and ended with the championship game on March 19, at the Municipal Auditorium in Kansas City, Missouri. A total of 28 games were played, including a third-place game in each region and a national third-place game.

San Francisco, coached by Phil Woolpert, won the national title with a 77–63 victory in the final game over La Salle, coached by Ken Loeffler. Bill Russell of San Francisco was named the tournament's Most Outstanding Player.

== Locations ==
The following are the sites selected to host each round of the 1955 tournament:

=== East-1 Region ===
First round (March 8)
Madison Square Garden, New York, New York (Hosts: Fordham University, Columbia University)

East-1 Regional (March 11 and 12)
The Palestra, Philadelphia, Pennsylvania (Host: University of Pennsylvania)

=== East-2 Region ===
First round (March 9)
Memorial Coliseum, Lexington, Kentucky (Host: University of Kentucky)

East-2 Regional (March 11 and 12)
McGaw Memorial Hall, Evanston, Illinois (Host: Northwestern University)

=== West-1 Region ===
First round (March 8)
Thunderbird Coliseum, El Reno, Oklahoma (Host: Oklahoma City University)

West Regional (March 11 and 12)
Ahearn Field House, Manhattan, Kansas (Host: Kansas State University)

=== West-2 Region ===
First round (March 8)
Cow Palace, San Francisco, California (Hosts: University of San Francisco, Stanford University, University of California, Berkeley)

West-2 Regional (March 11 and 12)
Oregon State Coliseum, Corvallis, Oregon (Host: Oregon State University)

=== Final Four ===
March 18 and 19
Municipal Auditorium, Kansas City, Missouri (Host: Missouri Valley Conference)

== Teams ==
Region	Team	Coach	Conference	Finished	Final Opponent	Score
East
East	Canisius	Joseph Curran	WNY3	Regional Runner-up	La Salle	L 99–64
East	Duke	Harold Bradley	Atlantic Coast	First round	Villanova	L 74–73
East	Iowa	Bucky O'Connor	Big Ten	Fourth Place	Colorado	L 75–54
East	Kentucky	Adolph Rupp	Southeastern	Regional third place	Penn State	W 84–59
East	La Salle	Ken Loeffler	Independent	Runner Up	San Francisco	L 77–63
East	Marquette	Jack Nagle	Independent	Regional Runner-up	Iowa	L 86–81
East	Memphis State	Eugene Lambert	Independent	First round	Penn State	L 59–55
East	Miami (OH)	Bill Rohr	Mid-American	First round	Marquette	L 90–79
East	Penn State	John Egli	Independent	Regional Fourth Place	Kentucky	L 84–59
East	Princeton	Franklin Cappon	Ivy League	Regional Fourth Place	Villanova	L 64–57
East	Villanova	Alex Severance	Independent	Regional third place	Princeton	W 64–57
East	West Virginia	Fred Schaus	Southern	First round	La Salle	L 95–61
East	Williams	Alex Shaw	Independent	First round	Canisius	L 73–60
West
West	Bradley	Bob Vanatta	Independent	Regional Runner-up	Colorado	L 93–81
West	Colorado	Bebe Lee	Big 7	Third Place	Iowa	W 75–54
West	Idaho State	Steve Belko	Independent	First round	Seattle	L 80–63
West	Oklahoma City	Doyle Parrack	Independent	First round	Bradley	L 69–65
West	Oregon State	Slats Gill	Pacific Coast	Regional Runner-up	San Francisco	L 57–56
West	San Francisco	Phil Woolpert	CBA	Champion	La Salle	W 77–63
West	Seattle	Al Brightman	Independent	Regional Fourth Place	Utah	L 108–85
West	SMU	Doc Hayes	Southwest	Regional Fourth Place	Tulsa	L 68–67
West	Tulsa	Clarence Iba	Missouri Valley	Regional third place	SMU	W 68–67
West	Utah	Jack Gardner	Mountain States	Regional third place	Seattle	W 108–85
West	West Texas State	Gus Miller	Border	First round	San Francisco	L 89–66

== Bracket ==
=== East-1 Region ===
First round
La Salle	95
West Virginia	61
Canisius	73
Williams	60
Villanova	74
Duke	73

Regional semifinals
Princeton	46
La Salle	73
Canisius	73
Villanova	71

Regional Finals
La Salle	99
Canisius	64
Third place
Villanova	64
Princeton	57

=== East-2 Region ===
First round
Marquette	90
Miami (OH)	79
Penn State	59
Memphis State	55

Regional semifinals
Kentucky	71
Marquette	79
Iowa	82
Penn State	53

Regional Finals
Marquette	81
Iowa	86
Third place
Kentucky	84
Penn St.	59

=== West-1 Region ===
First round
Bradley	69
Oklahoma City	65

Regional semifinals
SMU	79
Bradley	81
Colorado	69
Tulsa	59

Regional Finals
Bradley	81
Colorado	93
Third place
Tulsa	68
SMU	67

=== West-2 Region ===
First round
Seattle	80
Idaho State	63
San Francisco	89
West Texas State	66

Regional semifinals
Oregon State	83
Seattle	71
Utah	59
San Francisco	78

Regional Finals
Oregon State	56
San Francisco	57
Third place
Utah	108
Seattle	85

=== Final Four ===
National semifinal
Iowa	73
La Salle	76
Colorado	50
San Francisco	62

National Championship
La Salle	63
San Francisco	77
National third-place game
Iowa	54
Colorado	75

== See also ==
- 1955 National Invitation Tournament
- 1955 NAIA Basketball Tournament

== Notes ==
- The 1955 tournament saw a record eleven teams - Canisius, Duke, Iowa, Marquette, Memphis State, San Francisco, Southern Methodist, Tulsa, West Texas State, West Virginia and Williams College - make the tournament for the first time. This beat the record of ten teams set in 1953 (the first year which the tournament expanded to include a regional quarterfinal round), and would be beat in 1981 when 12 teams made the tournament.
- Two teams in the field, West Texas State College (now known as West Texas A&M University) and Williams College of Williamstown, Massachusetts, are no longer in Division I. Neither team would make the tournament again; West Texas is now in Division II and Williams is in Division III. The NCAA would split into University and College Divisions in 1956, thus ending the chances for smaller teams such as these to make the tournament.
