= List of Indianapolis Olympians players =

The following is a list of players of the now-defunct Indianapolis Olympians professional basketball team.

- Cliff Barker
- Leo Barnhorst
- Ralph Beard
- Leon Blevins
- Dillard Crocker
- Bob Evans
- Joe Graboski
- Alex Groza
- Bruce Hale
- Don Hanrahan
- Marshall Hawkins
- Kleggie Hermsen
- Joe Holland
- Wallace Jones
- Bob Lavoy
- Don Lofgran
- John Mahnken
- Mal McMullen
- Ed Mikan
- Chuck Mrazovich
- Bob Naber
- Ralph O'Brien
- Jack Parkinson
- Mel Payton
- Gene Rhodes
- Carl Shaeffer
- Bill Tosheff
- Floyd Volker
- Paul Walther
- Zeke Zawoluk
