= List of Kentucky Wildcats in the NBA draft =

The Kentucky Wildcats men's basketball team, representing the University of Kentucky, has had 138 players drafted into the National Basketball Association (NBA) since the league began holding drafts in 1947. Kentucky has had 60 players selected in the opening round of the draft.

Each NBA franchise seeks to add new players through an annual draft. The NBA uses a draft lottery to determine the first four picks of the NBA draft; the 14 teams that did not make the playoffs the previous year are eligible to participate. After the first four picks are decided, the rest of the teams pick in reverse order of their win–loss record. To be eligible for the NBA draft, a player in the United States must be at least 19 years old during the calendar year of the draft and must be at least one year removed from the graduation of his high school class. From 1967 until the ABA–NBA merger in 1976, the American Basketball Association (ABA) held its own draft.

== Key ==
F	Forward	C	Center	G	Guard

^{*}	Selected to an all-star game (ABA All-Star Game, NBA All-Star game)
^{†}	Won a championship (ABA Champion, NBA Champion)
^{§}	Won a Naismith College Player of the Year, National Championship, and NBA Finals
^{◊}	Honored as leagues NBA Most Valuable Player or NBA Defensive Player of the Year
^{Δ}	Inducted into Naismith Memorial Basketball Hall of Fame

== Players selected ==
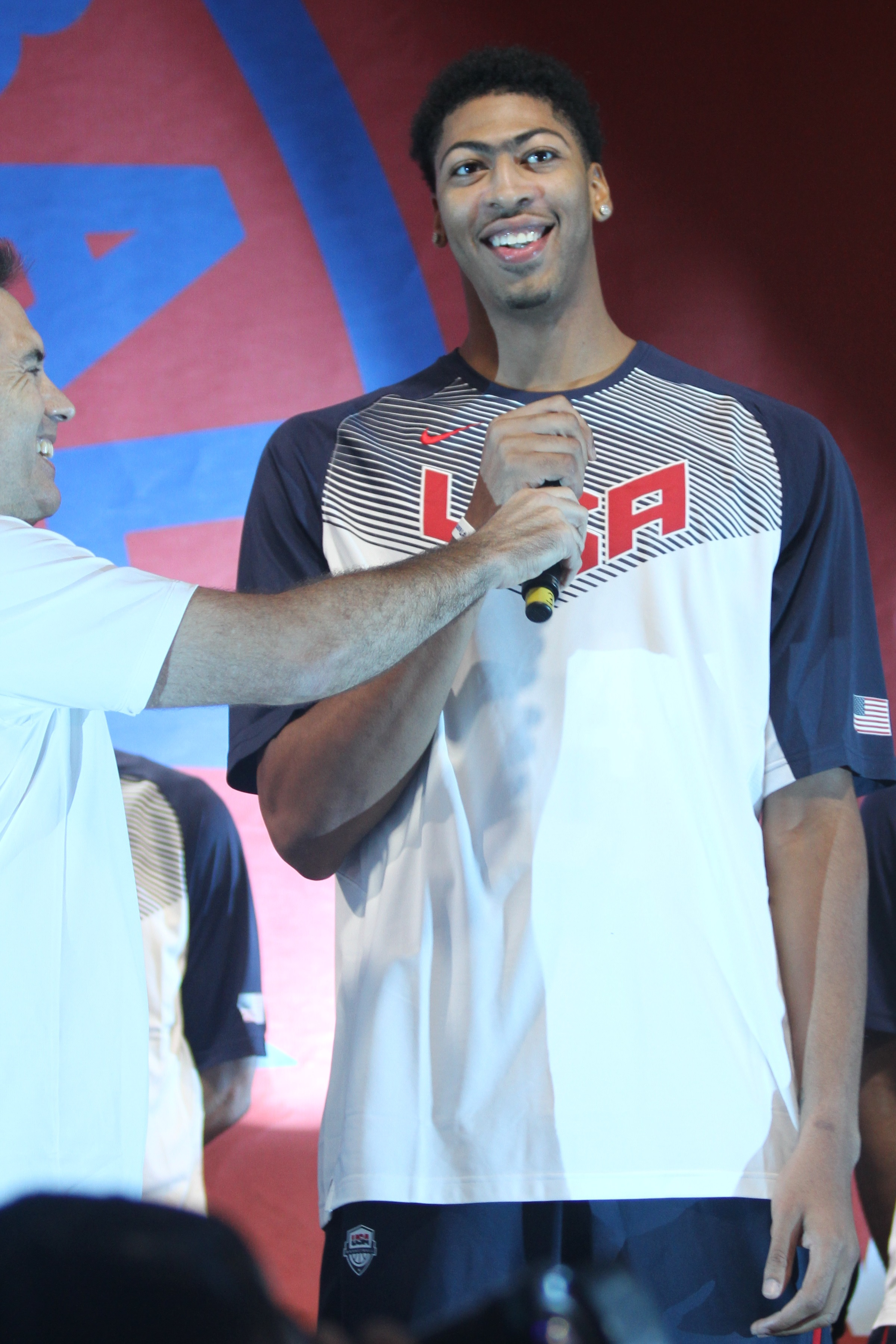
Anthony Davis was drafted 1st overall by the New Orleans Pelicans in the 2012 NBA Draft.

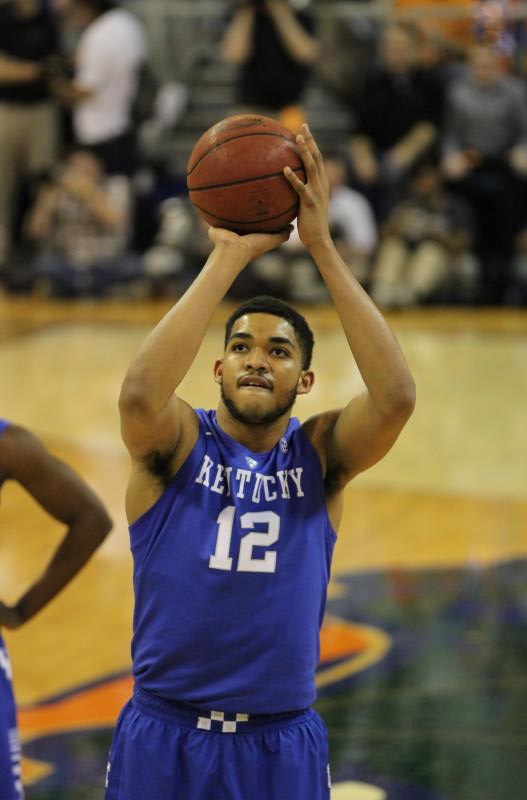
Karl-Anthony Towns was drafted 1st overall by the Minnesota Timberwolves in the 2015 NBA Draft.

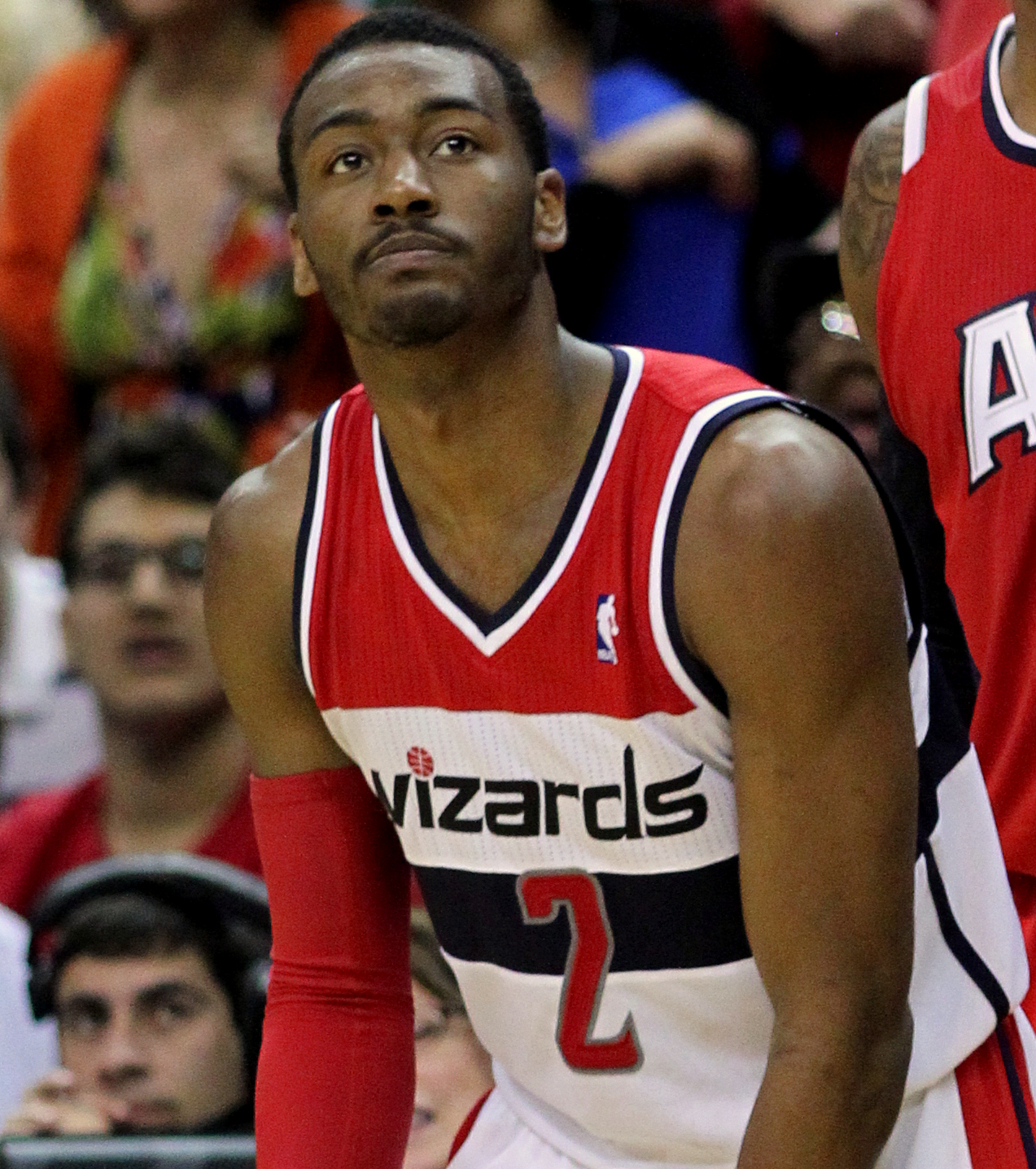
John Wall was drafted 1st overall by the Washington Wizards in the 2010 NBA Draft.

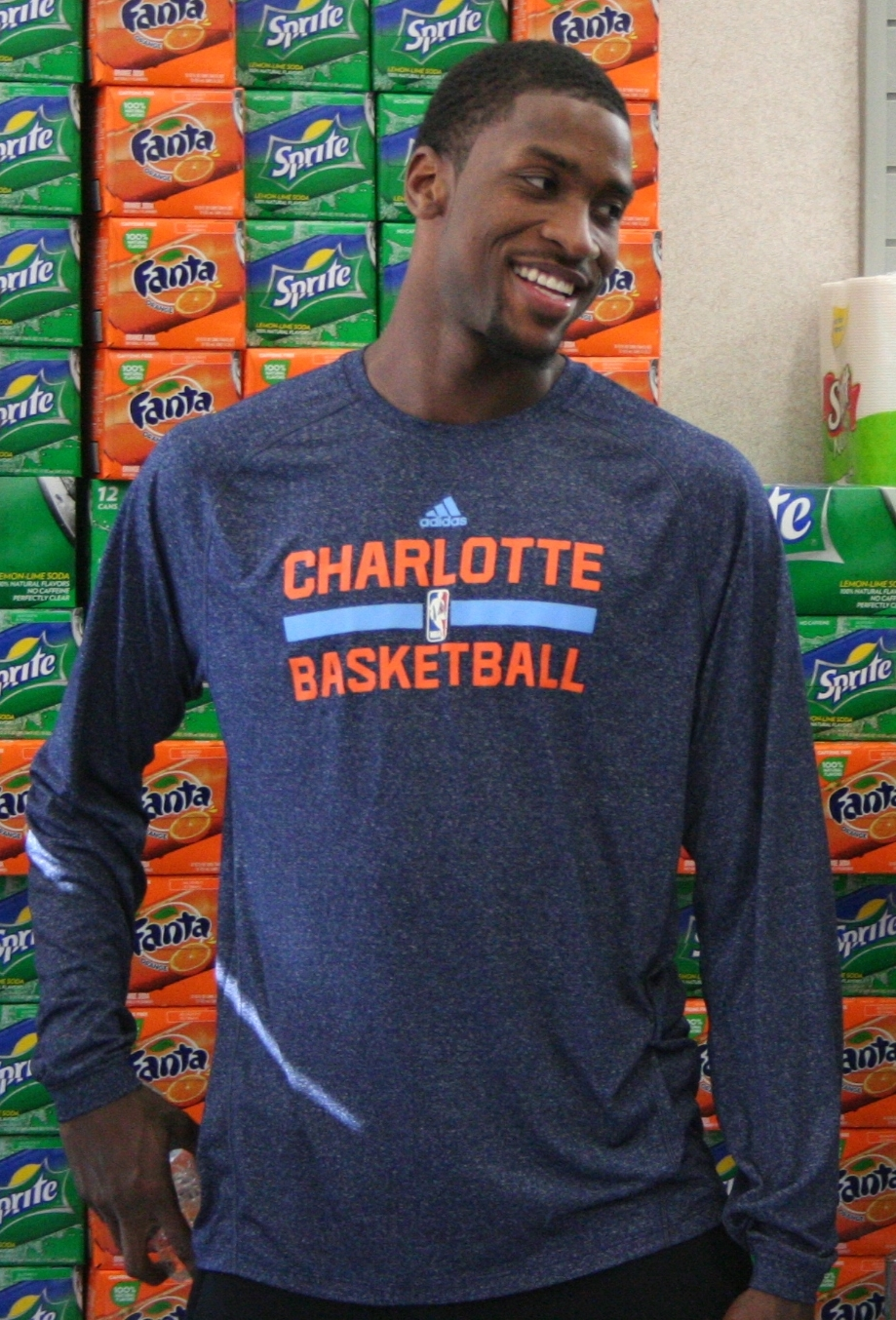
Michael Kidd-Gilchrist was drafted 2nd overall by the Charlotte Hornets in the 2012 NBA Draft.

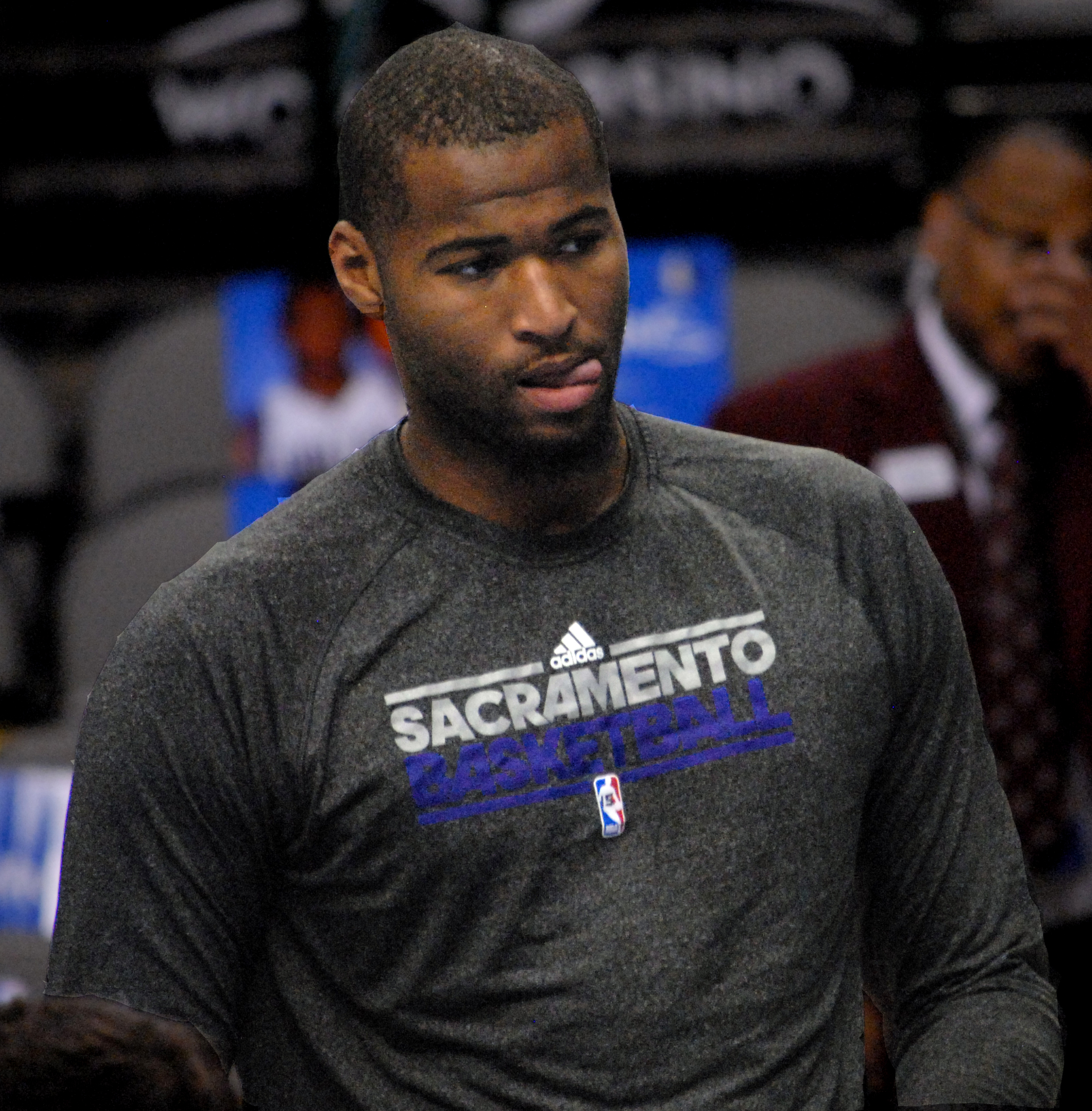
DeMarcus Cousins was drafted 5th overall by the Sacramento Kings in the 2010 NBA Draft.

Year	Round	Pick	Overall	Player name	Position	NBA team	Notes
1947	2	9	20	Jack Tingle	F	Washington Capitols	—
1948	2	6	18	Joe Holland	F	Baltimore Bullets	—
1948	2	12	24	Jack Parkinson	G	Washington Capitols	—
1948	3	8	32	Ken Rollins	G	Fort Wayne Pistons	—
1949	1	2	2	Alex Groza*	F	Indianapolis Olympians	NBA All-Star (1951)
1949	1	8	8	Wallace Jones	G	Washington Capitols	—
1949	2	10	22	Ralph Beard*	G	Chicago Stags	NBA All-Star (1951)
1949	5	8	52	Cliff Barker	SG	Washington Capitols	—
1950	7	1	73	Dale Barnstable	F	Boston Celtics	—
1950	4	9	45	Jim Line	F	Washington Capitols	—
1951	No selections						
1952	3	1	21	Bobby Watson	G	Milwaukee Hawks	—
1952	3	5	25	Skippy Whitaker	G	Indianapolis Olympians	—
1953	1	5	5	Frank Ramsey^{‡}	G	Boston Celtics	NBA Champion (1957, 1959, 1960, 1961, 1962, 1963, 1964); Naismith Memorial Basketball Hall of Fame Inductee (1981)
1953	3	6	22	Cliff Hagan^{‡}	G	Boston Celtics	NBA Champion (1958); NBA All-Star (1958, 1959, 1960, 1961, 1962); Naismith Memorial Basketball Hall of Fame Inductee (1977)
1953	7	6	58	Lou Tsioropoulos^{†}	F	Boston Celtics	NBA Champion (1957, 1959)
1953	10	7	86	Richard Prater	G	New York Knicks	—
1954	No selections						
1955	5	2	32	William Evans	F	Rochester Royals	—
1956	3	3	18	Jerry Bird	G	Minneapolis Lakers	—
1956	2	1	8	Bob Burrow	F	Rochester Royals	—
1956	10	3	72	Phil Grawemeyer	F	Minneapolis Lakers	—
1957	10	4	73	Gerry Calvert	G	Philadelphia 76ers	—
1958	2	2	9	Vernon Hatton	F	Cincinnati Royals	—
1959	4	6	28	Johnny Cox	G	New York Knicks	—
1960	4	8	32	Sid Cohen	G	Boston Celtics	—
1960	7	5	53	Bennie Kauffman	G	Syracuse Nationals	—
1960	18	2	96	Don Mills	G	Cincinnati Royals	—
1961	5	4	45	Bill Lickert	G, F	Los Angeles Lakers	—
1961	7	5	64	Roger Newman	G, F	Syracuse Nationals	—
1961	13	1	102	Ned Jennings	C	New York Knicks	—
1962	8	1	61	Larry Pursiful	F	Chicago Zephyrs	—
1963	No selections						
1964	2	5	12	Cotton Nash	F	Los Angeles Lakers	—
1965	No selections						
1966	3	4	24	Tommy Kron	G	St. Louis Hawks	—
1967	1	7	7	Pat Riley^{†‡}	G, F	San Diego Rockets	NBA Champion (1972 as player; 1982, 1985, 1987, 1988, 2006 as head coach; 2012, 2013 as executive); Naismith Memorial Basketball Hall of Fame Inductee (2008)
1967	4	7	28	Louie Dampier^{†‡}	G	Cincinnati Royals	ABA Champion (1975); ABA All-Star (1968, 1969, 1970, 1972, 1973, 1974, 1975); All-ABA Second Team (1968, 1969, 1970, 1974)
1968	5	10	60	Thad Jaracz	F	Boston Celtics	—
1968	9	13	119	Cliff Berger	F	Milwaukee Bucks	—
1969	10	15	139	Phil Argento	G	Los Angeles Lakers	—
1970	8	3	122	Dan Issel^{†‡}	F	Detroit Pistons	ABA Champion (1975); NBA All-Star (1977); ABA All-Star (1971, 1972, 1973, 1974, 1975, 1976); Naismith Memorial Basketball Hall of Fame Inductee (1993)
1970	8	11	130	Mike Casey	F	Chicago Bulls	—
1971	3	2	37	Larry Steele^{†}	F	Portland Trail Blazers	NBA Champion (1977)
1972	No selections						
1973	No selections						
1974	No selections						
1975	1	18	18	Kevin Grevey^{†}	G	Washington Bullets	NBA Champion (1978)
1975	2	18	36	Jimmy Dan Conner	G	Phoenix Suns	—
1975	3	12	49	Bob Guyette	G	Kansas City Kings	—
1975	7	5	113	Mike Flynn	G	Philadelphia 76ers	—
1976	No selections						
1977	2	2	24	Larry Johnson	G	Buffalo Braves	–
1978	1	4	4	Rick Robey^{†}	C	Indiana Pacers	NBA Champion (1981)
1978	1	16	16	Jack Givens	F	Atlanta Hawks	–
1978	2	18	39	James Lee	F	Seattle SuperSonics	–
1978	3	1	45	Mike Phillips	F	New Jersey Nets	–
1979	1	22	22	Kyle Macy	G	Phoenix Suns	–
1979	6	3	111	Truman Claytor	G	Detroit Pistons	–
1980	5	12	101	LaVon Williams	F	Cleveland Cavaliers	–
1980	9	4	183	Jay Shidler	G	Chicago Bulls	–
1981	6	12	127	Fred Cowan	F, C	Houston Rockets	–
1982	7	7	145	Chuck Verderber	G	Chicago Bulls	–
1983	2	9	33	Dirk Minniefield	G	Dallas Mavericks	–
1983	3	21	67	Derrick Hord	F	Cleveland Cavaliers	–
1983	6	18	134	Charles Hurt	F	Milwaukee Bucks	–
1984	1	2	2	Sam Bowie	F, C	Portland Trail Blazers	–
1984	1	6	6	Melvin Turpin	F, C	Washington Bullets	–
1984	4	11	81	Dickie Beal	G	Atlanta Hawks	–
1984	6	11	127	Jim Master	G	Atlanta Hawks	—
1984	8	1	163	Tom Heitz	G	Indiana Pacers	—
1985	No selections						
1986	1	5	5	Kenny Walker	F	New York Knicks	—
1986	5	13	105	Roger Harden	G	Los Angeles Lakers	—
1987	5	2	94	James Blackmon	G	New Jersey Nets	—
1988	1	8	8	Rex Chapman	G	Charlotte Hornets (Note: When the franchise previously known as the Charlotte Bobcats renamed itself the Charlotte Hornets starting with the 2014–15 season, it received sole ownership of the history and records of the original Charlotte Hornets, which played from 1988 to 2002.)	—
1988	3	1	51	Rob Lock	F	Los Angeles Clippers	—
1988	3	10	60	Ed Davender	G	Washington Bullets	—
1988	3	14	64	Winston Bennett	F	Cleveland Cavaliers	—
1989	No selections						
1990	No selections						
1991	No selections						
1992	No selections						
1993	1	4	4	Jamal Mashburn*	F	Dallas Mavericks	NBA All-Star (2003)
1994	2	2	4	Rodney Dent	F	Orlando Magic	—
1995	No selections						
1996	1	6	6	Antoine Walker^{†‡}	F	Boston Celtics	NBA Champion (2006); NBA All-Star (1998, 2002, 2003)
1996	1	16	16	Tony Delk	G	Charlotte Hornets	—
1996	1	19	19	Walter McCarty	F	New York Knicks	—
1996	2	23	52	Mark Pope	F	Indiana Pacers	—
1997	1	6	6	Ron Mercer	F	Boston Celtics	–
1997	1	13	13	Derek Anderson^{†}	G	Cleveland Cavaliers	NBA Champion (2006)
1998	1	29	29	Nazr Mohammed^{†}	C	Utah Jazz	NBA Champion (2005)
1999	1	28	28	Scott Padgett	F	Utah Jazz	—
2000	1	19	19	Jamaal Magloire*	F	Charlotte Hornets	NBA All-Star (2004)
2001	No selections						
2002	1	23	23	Tayshaun Prince^{†}	F	Detroit Pistons	NBA Champion (2004)
2003	2	13	43	Keith Bogans	G	Milwaukee Bucks	—
2004	No selections						
2005	No selections						
2006	1	21	21	Rajon Rondo^{†}	G	Phoenix Suns	NBA Champion (2008, 2020); NBA All-Star (2010, 2011, 2012, 2013)
2007	No selections						
2008	2	28	58	Joe Crawford	G	Los Angeles Lakers	—
2009	2	11	41	Jodie Meeks^{†}	G	Milwaukee Bucks	NBA Champion (2019)
2010	1	1	1	John Wall*	G	Washington Wizards	NBA All-Star (2014, 2015, 2016, 2017, 2018)
2010	1	5	5	DeMarcus Cousins*	F, C	Sacramento Kings	NBA All-Star (2015, 2016, 2017, 2018)
2010	1	13	13	Patrick Patterson	F	Houston Rockets	—
2010	1	18	18	Eric Bledsoe	G	Oklahoma City Thunder	—
2010	1	29	29	Daniel Orton	C	Orlando Magic	—
2011	1	3	3	Enes Kanter	F	Utah Jazz	—
2011	1	8	8	Brandon Knight	G	Detroit Pistons	—
2011	2	15	45	Josh Harrellson	G	New Orleans Hornets	—
2011	2	23	53	DeAndre Liggins	G	Orlando Magic	—
2012	1	1	1	Anthony Davis^{†}^{§}	F, C	New Orleans Hornets	NBA Champion (2020); NBA All-Star (2014, 2015, 2016, 2017, 2018, 2019, 2020, 2021)
2012	1	2	2	Michael Kidd-Gilchrist	F	Charlotte Bobcats	—
2012	1	18	18	Terrence Jones	F	Houston Rockets	—
2012	1	29	29	Marquis Teague	G	Chicago Bulls	—
2012	2	12	42	Doron Lamb	G	Milwaukee Bucks	—
2012	2	16	46	Darius Miller	F	New Orleans Hornets	–
2013	1	6	6	Nerlens Noel	C	New Orleans Pelicans	—
2013	1	29	29	Archie Goodwin	G	Oklahoma City Thunder	—
2014	1	7	7	Julius Randle*	F	Los Angeles Lakers	Most Improved Player (2021); NBA All-Star (2021, 2023, 2024)
2014	1	17	17	James Young	F	Boston Celtics	—
2015	1	1	1	Karl-Anthony Towns*	F, C	Minnesota Timberwolves	Rookie of the Year (2016); NBA All-Star (2018, 2019, 2022, 2024)
2015	1	6	6	Willie Cauley-Stein	C	Sacramento Kings	—
2015	1	12	12	Trey Lyles	F	Utah Jazz	—
2015	1	13	13	Devin Booker*	G	Phoenix Suns	NBA All-Star (2020, 2021, 2022, 2024)
2015	2	14	44	Andrew Harrison	G	Phoenix Suns	—
2015	2	18	48	Dakari Johnson	C	Oklahoma City Thunder	—
2016	1	7	7	Jamal Murray^{†}	G	Denver Nuggets	NBA Champion (2023)
2016	1	28	28	Skal Labissière	C	Phoenix Suns	—
2016	2	4	34	Tyler Ulis	G	Phoenix Suns	—
2017	1	5	5	De'Aaron Fox*	G	Sacramento Kings	NBA All-Star (2023)
2017	1	11	11	Malik Monk	G	Charlotte Hornets	—
2017	1	14	14	Bam Adebayo*	C	Miami Heat	NBA All-Star (2020, 2023, 2024)
2018	1	9	9	Kevin Knox II	F	New York Knicks	—
2018	1	11	11	Shai Gilgeous-Alexander*^{†}^{◊}	G	Charlotte Hornets	NBA MVP (2025, 2026); NBA champion (2025), NBA All-Star (2023, 2024, 2025, 2026)
2018	2	11	41	Jarred Vanderbilt	F	Orlando Magic	—
2018	2	15	45	Hamidou Diallo	G	Brooklyn Nets	—
2019	1	12	12	P. J. Washington	F	Charlotte Hornets	—
2019	1	13	13	Tyler Herro	G	Miami Heat	NBA Sixth Man of the Year (2022)
2019	1	29	29	Keldon Johnson	F	San Antonio Spurs	—
2020	1	21	21	Tyrese Maxey*	G	Philadelphia 76ers	NBA All-Star (2024)
2020	1	25	25	Immanuel Quickley	G	Oklahoma City Thunder	—
2020	2	11	42	Nick Richards	C	Charlotte Hornets	—
2021	1	22	22	Isaiah Jackson	PF	Indiana Pacers	—
2021	2	20	51	Brandon Boston Jr.	PG	Los Angeles Clippers	—
2021				Terrence Clarke	PG	NBA	Ceremonial pick
2022	1	7	7	Shaedon Sharpe	G	Portland Trail Blazers	—
2022	1	29	29	TyTy Washington Jr.	PG	Memphis Grizzlies	—
2023	1	10	10	Cason Wallace	G	Dallas Mavericks	—
2023	2	28	58	Chris Livingston	F	Milwaukee Bucks	—
2024	1	3	3	Reed Sheppard	PG	Houston Rockets	—
2024	1	8	8	Rob Dillingham	PG	San Antonio Spurs	—
2024	2	17	43	Antonio Reeves	SG	Orlando Magic	
2025	2	11	41	Koby Brea	SG	Golden State Warriors	—
2025	2	16	46	Amari Williams	C	Orlando Magic	—
