= Kentucky Wildcats men's basketball under Adolph Rupp =

College head coaching tenure

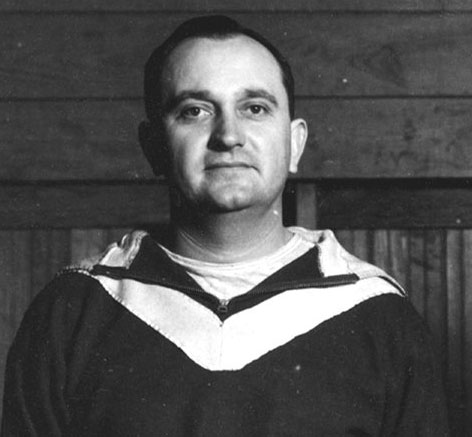
- Adolph Rupp

Biographical details
- Born: September 2, 1901; Halstead, Kansas
- Died: December 10, 1977 (aged 76); Lexington, Kentucky

Coaching career (HC unless noted)
- 1930–1972: Kentucky

Head coaching record
- Overall: 876–190, 5th most wins all-time; 82.2% winning percentage, 2nd highest all-time

Accomplishments and honors

Championships
- NCAA championship (1948, 1949, 1951, 1958); Regional Championships – Final Four (1942, 1948, 1949, 1951, 1958, 1966)

Awards
- National Coach of the Year (5-time, 1950, 1954, 1959, 1966, 1970); SEC Coach of the Year (7-time, 1964, 1966, 1968, 1969, 1970, 1971, 1972)
- Basketball Hall of Fame; Inducted in 1969
- College Basketball Hall of Fame; Inducted in 2006

Kentucky Wildcats men's basketball under Adolph Rupp covers the history of the University of Kentucky Wildcats college basketball team during the period from when Adolph Rupp was hired as head coach in 1930 through 1972. Under Rupp, Kentucky played as part of the National Collegiate Athletic Association (NCAA), and as a member of the Southeastern Conference (SEC). The Wildcats under Rupp played its home games at Memorial Coliseum in Lexington, Kentucky. During the forty years Rupp has served as head basketball coach, Kentucky compiled an overall official record of 876–190 (.822), won four NCAA championships (1948, 1949, 1951, 1958), one NIT title in 1946, appeared in 20 NCAA tournaments, had six NCAA Final Four appearances, captured twenty-seven Southeastern Conference (SEC) regular season titles, and won thirteen SEC tournaments.

Rupp gained the nicknames "Baron of the Bluegrass" and "The Man in the Brown Suit" during his time with the Wildcats. On the court, he popularized the fast break and set offense in college basketball, and his teams were known for stern discipline. He required his players to keep their hair short and attend to detail, and former player Alex Groza called him a "strict fundamentalist".

== Year-by-year results ==
Record table
Season	Coach	Overall	Conference	Standing	Postseason
Adolph Rupp (Southeastern) (1932–1972)
1932–33	Adolph Rupp	21-3	8-0	1st	Helms National Champion
1933–34	Adolph Rupp	16-1	11-0	1st	
1934–35	Adolph Rupp	19-2	11-0	1st	
1935–36	Adolph Rupp	15-6	6-2	2nd	
1936–37	Adolph Rupp	17-5	5-3	1st	
1937–38	Adolph Rupp	13-5	6-0	2nd	
1938–39	Adolph Rupp	16-4	5-2	1st	
1939–40	Adolph Rupp	15-6	4-4	1st	
1940–41	Adolph Rupp	17-8	8-1	2nd	
1941–42	Adolph Rupp	19-6	6-2	1st	NCAA Final Four
1942–43	Adolph Rupp	17-6	8-1	2nd	
1943–44	Adolph Rupp	19-2	–	1st	NIT Third Place
1944–45	Adolph Rupp	22-4	5-0	1st	NCAA Elite Eight
1945–46	Adolph Rupp	28-2	6-0	1st	NIT champions
1946–47	Adolph Rupp	34-3	11-0	1st	NIT Runner-up
1947–48	Adolph Rupp	36-3	9-0	1st	NCAA champions
1948–49	Adolph Rupp	32-2	13-0	1st	NCAA champions
1949–50	Adolph Rupp	25-5	11-2	1st	NIT First round
1950–51	Adolph Rupp	32-2	14-0	1st	NCAA champions
1951–52	Adolph Rupp	29-3	14-0	1st	NCAA Elite Eight
1952–53	No season				
1953–54	Adolph Rupp	25-0	15-0	1st	declined NCAA bid
1954–55	Adolph Rupp	23-3	12-2	1st	NCAA Sweet Sixteen
1955–56	Adolph Rupp	20-6	12-2	2nd	NCAA Elite Eight
1956–57	Adolph Rupp	23-5	12-2	1st	NCAA Elite Eight
1957–58	Adolph Rupp	23-6	12-2	1st	NCAA champion
1958–59	Adolph Rupp	24-3	12-2	2nd	NCAA Sweet Sixteen
1959–60	Adolph Rupp	18-7	10-4	3rd	
1960–61	Adolph Rupp	19-9	11-4	2nd	NCAA Elite Eight
1961–62	Adolph Rupp	23-3	13-1	1st	NCAA Elite Eight
1962–63	Adolph Rupp	16-9	8-6	5th	
1963–64	Adolph Rupp	21-6	11-3	1st	NCAA Sweet Sixteen
1964–65	Adolph Rupp	15-10	10-6	5th	
1965–66	Adolph Rupp	27-2	15-1	1st	NCAA Runner-up
1966–67	Adolph Rupp	13-13	8-10	5th	
1967–68	Adolph Rupp	22-5	15-3	1st	NCAA Elite Eight
1968–69	Adolph Rupp	23-5	16-2	1st	NCAA Sweet Sixteen
1969–70	Adolph Rupp	26-2	17-1	1st	NCAA Elite Eight
1970–71	Adolph Rupp	22-6	16-2	1st	NCAA Sweet Sixteen
1971–72	Adolph Rupp	21-7	14-4	1st	NCAA Elite Eight
Total:		876-190			
National champion Postseason invitational champion Conference regular season champion Conference regular season and conference tournament champion Division regular season champion Division regular season and conference tournament champion Conference tournament champion

== NBA draft picks ==
Kentucky Wildcats under Adolph Rupp selected in the NBA draft
Draft				Player name	Position	NBA team (Note: This is the team that drafted the player, not their most recent team.)	Notes
Year	Round	Pick	Overall	Player name	Position	NBA team	Notes
1947	—	—	—	Jack Tingle	F	Washington Capitols	—
1948	—	—	—	Joe Holland	F	Baltimore Bullets	—
1948	—	—	—	Jack Parkinson	G	Washington Capitols	—
1948	—	—	—	Ken Rollins	G	Fort Wayne Pistons	—
1949	1	2	2	Alex Groza*	F	Indianapolis Olympians	NBA All-Star (1951); All-NBA First Team (1950); All-NBA First Team (1951)
1949	1	6	6	Wallace Jones	G	Washington Capitols	—
1949	2	—	22	Ralph Beard*	G	Chicago Stags	NBA All-Star (1951); All-NBA First Team (1951); All-NBA Second Team (1950)
1950	—	—	—	Dale Barnstable	F	Boston Celtics	—
1950	—	—	—	Jim Line	F	Washington Capitols	—
1952	—	—	—	Bobby Watson	G	Milwaukee Hawks	—
1952	—	—	—	Skippy Whitaker	G	Indianapolis Olympians	—
1953	1	5	5	Frank Ramsey^{†}	G	Boston Celtics	NBA Champion (1957, 1959, 1960, 1961, 1962, 1963, 1964); Naismith Memorial Basketball Hall of Fame Inductee (1981)
1953	3	—	13	Cliff Hagan^{‡}	G	Boston Celtics	NBA Champion (1958); NBA All-Star (1958, 1959, 1960, 1961, 1962); All-NBA Second Team (1958, 1959); Naismith Memorial Basketball Hall of Fame Inductee (1977)
1953	7	—	23	Lou Tsioropoulos^{†}	F	Boston Celtics	NBA Champion (1957, 1959)
1955	5	2	32	Billy Evans	F	Rochester Royals	—
1956	—	—	—	Jerry Bird	G	Minneapolis Lakers	—
1956	—	—	—	Bob Burrow	F	Rochester Royals	—
1956	—	—	—	Phil Grawemeyer		Minneapolis Lakers	—
1957	10	4	73	Gerry Calvert	G	Philadelphia 76ers	—
1958	2	2	9	Vernon Hatton	F	Cincinnati Royals	—
1959	4	6	28	Johnny Cox	G	New York Knicks	—
1960	4	8	32	Sid Cohen	G	Boston Celtics	—
1960	7	5	53	Bernie Kauffman	G	Syracuse Nationals	—
1960	18	2	96	Don Mills	G	Cincinnati Royals	—
1961	5	4	45	Bill Lickert	G, F	Los Angeles Lakers	—
1961	7	5	64	Roger Newman	G, F	Syracuse Nationals	—
1961	13	1	102	Ned Jennings	C	New York Knicks	—
1962	8	1	61	Larry Pursiful	F	Chicago Zephyrs	—
1964	2	5	13	Cotton Nash	F	Los Angeles Lakers	—
1966	3	4	24	Tommy Kron	G	St. Louis Hawks	—
1967	1	1	7	Pat Riley^{†}	G, F	San Diego Rockets	NBA Champion (1972, 1982, 1985, 1987, 1988, 2006, 2012, 2013); NBA Coach of the Year (1990, 1993, 1997); NBA Executive of the Year (2011); Naismith Memorial Basketball Hall of Fame Inductee (2008)
1967	4	7	28	Louie Dampier^{‡}	G	Cincinnati Royals	ABA Champion (1975); ABA All-Star (1968, 1969, 1970, 1972, 1973, 1974, 1975); All-ABA Second Team (1968, 1969, 1970, 1974); Naismith Memorial Basketball Hall of Fame Inductee (2015)
1965	5	10	60	Thad Jaracz	F	Boston Celtics	
1965	9	13	119	Cliff Berger	F	Milwaukee Bucks	
1969	10	15	139	Phil Argento	G	Los Angeles Lakers	
1970	8	3	122	Dan Issel^{‡}	F	Detroit Pistons	ABA Champion (1975); NBA All-Star (1977); ABA All-Star (1971, 1972, 1973, 1974, 1975, 1976); ABA All-Star Game MVP (1972); ABA Rookie of the Year (1971); Naismith Memorial Basketball Hall of Fame Inductee (1993)
1970	8	11	130	Mike Casey	F	Chicago Bulls	—
1971	3	2	37	Larry Steele^{†}	F	Portland Trail Blazers	NBA Champion (1977)

== Fabulous Five ==
The 1948 Kentucky Wildcats not only won the 1948 NCAA title, but provided the core of the United States 1948 Olympic team that won the gold medal in the London Games. The core of five players that made up the Fabulous Five were Ralph Beard, Alex Groza, Wallace 'Wah Wah' Jones, Cliff Barker and Kenny Rollins.

A year later in 1949, the same team would win back-to-back champions, making Kentucky only the second team to repeat after Oklahoma A&M (Now Oklahoma State).

The Fabulous Five are considered one of the greatest teams in Kentucky basketball history. Over two seasons the Fabulous Five compiled a 68–5 record with two consecutive NCAA Championships.

== Point Shaving Scandal ==
On October 20, 1951, former Kentucky players Alex Groza, Ralph Beard, and Dale Barnstable were arrested for taking bribes from gamblers to shave points during the National Invitation Tournament game against the Loyola Ramblers in the 1948–49 season. This game occurred during the same year that Kentucky won their second straight NCAA title under Rupp. Rupp and the university were criticized by the presiding judge, Saul Streit, for creating an atmosphere for the violations to occur and for "failing in his duty to observe the amateur rules, to build character, and to protect the morals and health of his charges". Rupp denied any knowledge of the point shaving and no evidence was ever brought against him to show he was connected to the incident in any way.

At the conclusion of this scandal, a subsequent NCAA investigation found that Kentucky had committed several rule violations, including giving illegal spending money to players on several occasions, and also allowing some ineligible athletes to compete. As a result, the Southeastern Conference voted to ban Kentucky from competing for a year and the NCAA requested all other basketball-playing members not to schedule Kentucky, with eventually none doing so. As a result of these actions, Kentucky was forced to cancel the entire 1952–53 basketball season. Years later, Walter Byers, the first executive director of the NCAA, unofficially referred to this punishment as the first de facto NCAA death penalty, despite the current rule first coming into effect in 1985, thus the NCAA having no such enforcement power previous to that. Echoing Byers' view, the NCAA's official stance is very much the same, and they now state in hindsight, "In effect, it was the Association's first death penalty, though its enforcement was binding only through constitutional language that required members to compete against only those schools that were compliant with NCAA rules. Despite fears that it would resist, Kentucky accepts the penalty and, in turn, gives the NCAA credibility to enforce its rules."

== A perfect season ==
The team returned with a vengeance the next year, posting a perfect 25–0 record (Rupp's only undefeated season), for which it was awarded the 1954 Helms National Championship. In addition, Kentucky also finished ranked #1 in the final Associated Press poll. On the team were three players who had graduated at the conclusion of the previous academic year. When, at the last minute, the NCAA ruled these players ineligible from post-season play, Rupp decided to skip the 1954 NCAA Tournament in protest.

== Fiddlin' Five ==
Before the 1957–58 season began, Coach Adolph Rupp commented about the upcoming season, "They might be pretty good barnyard fiddlers, but we have a Carnegie Hall schedule, and it will take violinists to play that competition". When the Wildcats became notorious for, as Rupp put it, "fiddlin' around and fiddlin' around then finally pulling it out at the end," the team was tagged with the nickname "The Fiddlin' Five." The "Fiddlin' Five" became Rupp's fourth national championship team when it defeated Elgin Baylor and Seattle in the title game at Louisville's Freedom Hall, 84–72. After the game Rupp said, "Those boys certainly are not concert violinists, but they sure can fiddle."

== Rupp's Runts ==
The last of Rupp's teams were the Rupp's Runts. Nicknamed such because there was no starter taller than 6'5". Despite its lack of size, it used defensive pressure and a fast-paced offense to take a 27–1 record and top national ranking into the NCAA final against Texas Western (who also finished the season with only one loss and entered the tournament ranked second).

The now historic 1966 NCAA championship game against Texas Western (now University of Texas at El Paso or UTEP) marked the first occurrence that an all-white starting five (Kentucky) played an all-black starting five (Texas Western) in the NCAA championship game. Texas Western won the game 72–65, on the night of March 19, 1966. This game, and the result of it, were especially significant as the game came at a time when the civil rights movement was coming into full swing around the country. In 1969, after recruiting several black players for over six years (Wes Unseld was the first black player to receive a formal scholarship offer in 1964), Rupp finally signed his first black player, Tom Payne, an athletic 7'-1" center out of Louisville. This ended the aspect of all-white Kentucky teams forever, and marked a new era with many notable black Kentucky basketball legends, including Jack Givens, Sam Bowie, Kenny Walker, Jamal Mashburn, Tayshaun Prince, Rajon Rondo, John Wall, and Anthony Davis.

== Rupp Arena ==
Adolph Rupp left a lasting legacy on the Wildcats basketball program. In the fall of 1975 Lexington opened a new basketball arena for the Kentucky basketball program. The Wildcats moved off campus from Memorial Coliseum to Rupp Arena in the downtown metroplex. Appropriately the arena was named after the man that had built the program's tradition in the forty years that he was head coach. With an official capacity of 23,500, it is the largest arena designed specifically for basketball, as well as the largest indoor arena by capacity, in the United States. In Rupp Arena, the Kentucky Wildcats men's basketball team regularly leads the nation in college basketball home attendance. The arena also regularly hosts NCAA tournament games including as the host of the 1985 NCAA Final Four, won in an upset by eighth-seeded Villanova.
