= Jack Parkinson (basketball) =

American basketball player (born 1924–1997)

Personal information
- Born: March 4, 1924 Yorktown, Indiana, U.S.
- Died: May 29, 1997 (aged 73) Yorktown, Indiana, U.S.
- Listed height: 6 ft 0 in (1.83 m)
- Listed weight: 174 lb (79 kg)

Career information
- High school: Yorktown (Yorktown, Indiana)
- College: Kentucky (1943–1948)
- NBA draft: 1948: 2nd round, 24th overall pick
- Drafted by: Washington Capitols
- Playing career: 1949–1950
- Position: Guard
- Number: 5

Career history
- 1949–1950: Indianapolis Olympians

Career highlights
- NCAA champion (1948); NIT champion (1946); Consensus second-team All-American (1946)

Career NBA statistics
- Points: 3
- Assists: 2
- Games played: 4
- Stats at NBA.com
- Stats at Basketball Reference

Jack Gordon Parkinson (March 4, 1924 – May 29, 1997) was an American basketball player who is one of few players in National Collegiate Athletic Association (NCAA) history to win both the National Invitation Tournament (1946) and the NCAA tournament (1948). He also played one season in the National Basketball Association.

== Early life ==
Parkinson grew up in Yorktown, Indiana and attended Yorktown High School. A two-sport star, he earned varsity letters in baseball and basketball for all four years. In 1941–42, Parkinson's senior year, he led Delaware County in scoring for basketball and hit .500 in baseball. He also threw a no-hitter during the county baseball championship match. Parkinson was offered a contract by Major League Baseball's Cincinnati Reds, but his desire to play basketball for legendary Kentucky Wildcats men's basketball coach Adolph Rupp was so strong that he passed up a professional baseball opportunity to play for him.

== College and professional ==
Parkinson earned four varsity letters as a member of the Kentucky men's basketball team in the Southeastern Conference (SEC). He played for Rupp from 1943–44 through 1945–46 and again in 1947–48; during what would have been his true senior season, Parkinson was overseas for 11 months after enlisting in the Army.

As a freshman in 1943–44, he helped lead the Wildcats to a 19–2 overall record and win both the SEC regular season and tournament championships. He was named to the All-SEC First Team and All-SEC Tournament Team.

In 1944–45, the Wildcats once again were SEC regular season and tournament champions. Parkinson earned his second All-SEC First Team and All-Tournament Team honors while helping the team earn a berth in the NCAA tournament. They finished the season with a 22–4 record.

Parkinson's best collegiate season came as a junior in 1945–46. He averaged 11.3 points per game, earned his third consecutive All-SEC First Team and All-SEC Tournament Team selections while leading the Wildcats to yet more championships, and ultimately led them to win their first-ever NIT. They finished the season 30–2 and edged Rhode Island, 46–45, in the NIT championship game. Parkinson was named a consensus Second Team All-American as well. After the school year ended, he spent an 11-month stint in the Army, which put off his college career by one season.

When Parkinson returned in 1947–48 for his senior season, he found himself relegated to coming off of the bench rather than starting, something which he had done for his whole career. He was playing behind what came to be known as Kentucky's "Fab Five" of Alex Groza, Ralph Beard, Cliff Barker, Kenny Rollins and Wallace "Wah Wah" Jones, which is one of Kentucky's most famous all-time teams. Kentucky would go on to win the SEC regular season and tournament as well as the 1948 NCAA Championship, but Parkinson's role in the success was greatly reduced from two years prior. Despite this, he would end his career with a distinguished collection of championships and accolades, including:

- 1946 NIT champion
- 1946 Consensus second-team All-American
- 1948 NCAA champion
- 3× First-team All-Southeastern Conference
- 3× All-SEC tournament team
- 4× SEC regular season champion
- 4× SEC Tournament champion
- 851 career points in 106 games (8.02 ppg)
- 105–11 overall record in Parkinson's four seasons

Jack Parkinson was selected in the 1949 BAA Draft by the Washington Capitols. He did not play in the league until 1949–50, however, as a member of the Indianapolis Olympians. In only four career games, Parkinson scored three points. In addition to his brief NBA career, he also played with the Whiskered Wizards basketball team of St. Augustine, Florida, and with the Toledo Mercurys, who traveled with the Harlem Globetrotters.

== Later life ==
Parkinson returned to Yorktown, Indiana and opened a wholesale plumbing and heating business in Muncie. He was elected into the Delaware County Athletic Hall of Fame and the Indiana Basketball Hall of Fame.

His son, Bruce G. Parkinson, was an All-American as a player at Purdue and still holds the school's record for career assists (690). Bruce led the Boilermakers to the 1974 NIT Championship and was the Captain of the 1975 Pan-Am Gold Medal Men's Basketball Team. Bruce was elected to the Indiana Basketball Hall of Fame in 2004.

The Parkinsons are one of a handful of father-son pairs who have been elected to the Indiana Basketball Hall of Fame.

His grandson, Austin Parkinson, is the current head coach of the women's basketball team at Butler University. Austin was an Academic All-Big Ten point guard at Purdue; following a celebrated career in high school (Indiana All-Star; scored over 1,665+ points).

Jack Parkinson died on May 29, 1997, due to complications from a brain tumor.

== Career statistics ==
Legend
GP	Games played	GS	Games started	MPG	Minutes per game
FG%	Field goal percentage	3P%	3-point field goal percentage	FT%	Free throw percentage
RPG	Rebounds per game	APG	Assists per game	SPG	Steals per game
BPG	Blocks per game	PPG	Points per game	**Bold**	Career high

=== NBA ===
==== Regular season ====
Year	Team	GP	FG%	FT%	APG	PPG
1949–50	Indianapolis	4	.083	1.000	.5	.8
