= Joe Holland (basketball) =

American basketball player

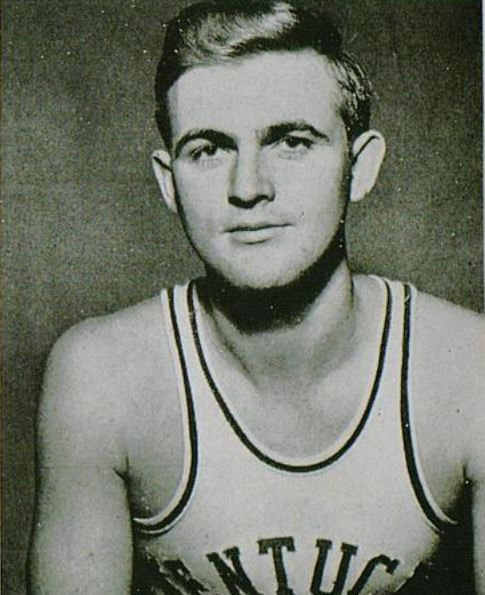
- Holland in 1948

Personal information
- Born: September 26, 1925 Birmingham, Kentucky, U.S.
- Died: September 18, 2010 (aged 84)
- Listed height: 6 ft 4 in (1.93 m)
- Listed weight: 185 lb (84 kg)

Career information
- High school: Benton (Benton, Kentucky)
- College: Kentucky (1945–1948)
- NBA draft: 1948: 2nd round, -
- Drafted by: Baltimore Bullets
- Position: Small forward
- Number: 14

Career history
- 1949–1952: Indianapolis Olympians

Career highlights
- NCAA champion (1948)
- Stats at NBA.com
- Stats at Basketball Reference

Joseph Burnett Holland Sr. (September 26, 1925 – September 18, 2010) was an American basketball player. He won an NCAA championship at the University of Kentucky and played three years in the National Basketball Association from 1949 to 1952.

== College career ==
Holland, a 6'4 forward from Benton, Kentucky, played for Kentucky from 1945 to 1948. He was a key player for the Wildcats, earning first team All-Southeastern Conference in 1947 and playing a key role in helping Adolph Rupp win his first championship as a part of the 1947–48 Wildcats team.

== Professional career ==
After graduating from UK in 1949, Holland was drafted by the Baltimore Bullets in the 1948 BAA Draft. Holland played three seasons with the Indianapolis Olympians, where he was reunited with college teammates Cliff Barker, Ralph Beard, Wah Wah Jones and Jack Parkinson. Holland played three seasons for the Olympians, averaging 5.8 points, 4.2 rebounds and 2.1 assists per game in 186 total games.

== Career statistics ==
Legend
GP	Games played	GS	Games started	MPG	Minutes per game
FG%	Field goal percentage	3P%	3-point field goal percentage	FT%	Free throw percentage
RPG	Rebounds per game	APG	Assists per game	SPG	Steals per game
BPG	Blocks per game	PPG	Points per game	**Bold**	Career high

=== NBA ===
==== Regular season ====
Year	Team	GP	MPG	FG%	FT%	RPG	APG	PPG
1949–50	Indianapolis	64		.320	**.690**		2.0	6.1
1950–51	Indianapolis	**67**		.330	.569	**5.1**	**2.2**	**7.0**
1951–52	Indianapolis	55	**13.4**	**.351**	.580	3.0	.9	4.1
Career		186	13.4	.331	.621	4.2	1.8	5.8

==== Playoffs ====
Year	Team	GP	MPG	FG%	FT%	RPG	APG	PPG
1949–50	Indianapolis	**6**		.344	**.400**		2.5	8.0
1950–51	Indianapolis	3		**.472**	.250	**4.0**	**3.7**	**11.7**
1951–52	Indianapolis	1	**1.0**	–	–	.0	.0	.0
Career		10	1.0	.392	.368	3.0	2.6	8.3
