= 1949–50 Indianapolis Olympians season =

- Division champions
- Head coach: Cliff Barker
- Arena: Hinkle Fieldhouse

Results
- Record: 39–25 (.609)
- Place: Division: 1st (Western)
- Playoff finish: Division finals (eliminated 1-2)
- Stats at Basketball Reference
- Radio: WXLW

The 1949–50 Indianapolis Olympians season was the first season for the Indianapolis Olympians in the National Basketball Association (NBA). Originally, the Olympians franchise was created as a response by the older National Basketball League (NBL) to the younger Basketball Association of America (BAA) losing the Indianapolis Jets team by bankruptcy (though that team ironically had its greatest history within the NBL as the Indianapolis Kautskys under grocer Frank Kautsky's ownership) months before the NBL and BAA merged operations to become the present-day NBA (though with the BAA's history holding a greater presence there). As a result of this situation at hand, the Olympians franchise would enter the NBA not as a continuation of the Indianapolis Jets franchise, but as an expansion franchise for the newly merged league instead. Despite them being an expansion franchise, the Olympians would end up being the champions of the Central Division, though they would be eliminated from the playoffs by the Anderson Packers, who previously were the final champions held in the NBL's history. By the end of the season, the Olympians would join the Tri-Cities Blackhawks as the only other Central Division team to play in the NBA beyond this current season, as the other four Central Division teams would defect from the NBA to create a short-lived rivaling professional basketball league to compete against the NBA called the National Professional Basketball League.

== BAA/NBA draft ==
Round	Pick	Player	Position	Nationality	School/Club team
1	2	Alex Groza	C	United States	Kentucky
2	–	Leo Barnhorst	F/G	United States	Notre Dame
3	–	Mac Otten	F/C	United States	Bowling Green
4	–	Bob Evans	G	United States	Butler
6	–	Don Boven	F/G	United States	Western Michigan

The following selections above would actually be draft selections made by the Indianapolis Jets, a team that originally was operating within the Basketball Association of America at the time, who are primarily here for completion's sake since the Olympians would not take on the Jets' history as a franchise. The Indianapolis Olympians would actually participate in the 1949 NBL draft, which occurred months before the National Basketball League and the rivaling Basketball Association of America would merge operations to become the present-day National Basketball Association, with the Olympians making their selections as an expansion franchise some time after the Jets franchise went into bankruptcy. However, as of 2026, no records of what the Olympians' draft picks were for the NBL have properly come up outside of the top selection still being Alex Groza and the Olympians' second selection after Groza being teammate Ralph Beard from the University of Kentucky, with any information on who those final selections for the NBL and what the expansion draft picks for the Olympians franchise might have been currently being lost to time in the process.

== Roster ==
1949–50 Indianapolis Olympians roster
Players

Pos.	No.	Player	Height	Weight	DOB	From
G	10	Cliff Barker	6 ft 2 in (1.88 m)	185 lb (84 kg)		Kentucky
G	12	Ralph Beard	5 ft 10 in (1.78 m)	175 lb (79 kg)		Kentucky
G	9	Bob Evans	6 ft 2 in (1.88 m)	175 lb (79 kg)		Butler
C	15	Alex Groza	6 ft 7 in (2.01 m)	218 lb (99 kg)		Kentucky
G/F	7	Bruce Hale	6 ft 1 in (1.85 m)	170 lb (77 kg)		Santa Clara
F	19	Marshall Hawkins	6 ft 3 in (1.91 m)	205 lb (93 kg)		Tennessee
F	14	Joe Holland	6 ft 4 in (1.93 m)	185 lb (84 kg)		Kentucky
F	17	Wallace Jones	6 ft 4 in (1.93 m)	225 lb (102 kg)		Kentucky
F/C	16	Mal McMullen	6 ft 5 in (1.96 m)	210 lb (95 kg)		Xavier
G	5	Jack Parkinson	6 ft 0 in (1.83 m)	174 lb (79 kg)		Kentucky
G/F		Carl Shaeffer	6 ft 3 in (1.91 m)	185 lb (84 kg)		Alabama
F/C	20	Floyd Volker	6 ft 4 in (1.93 m)	205 lb (93 kg)		Wyoming
G/F	5	Paul Walther	6 ft 2 in (1.88 m)	160 lb (73 kg)		Tennessee

Coaches
Head coach
- Cliff Barker

Legend
- (DP) Unsigned draft pick
- (FA) Free agent
- (S) Suspended
- Injured

== Regular season ==
=== Season standings ===
Western Division	W	L	PCT	GB	Home	Road	Neutral	Div
x-Indianapolis Olympians	39	25	.609	–	24–7	12–16	3–2	26–9
x-Anderson Packers	37	27	.578	2	22–9	12–18	3–0	25–12
x-Tri-Cities Blackhawks	29	35	.453	10	20–13	6–20	3–2	20–17
x-Sheboygan Red Skins	22	40	.355	17	17–14	5–22	0–4	15–20
Waterloo Hawks	19	43	.306	20	16–15	2–22	1–6	13–22
Denver Nuggets	11	51	.177	28	9–16	1–25	1–10	8–27

=== Game log ===
1949–50 game log
#	Date	Opponent	Score	High points	Venue	Record
1	November 1	Denver	W 71–64	Alex Groza (19)		1–0
2	November 8	New York	L 64–79	Alex Groza (18)		1–1
3	November 9	at Syracuse	L 73–103	Alex Groza (24)		1–2
4	November 10	at New York	W 83–79	Alex Groza (41)		2–2
5	November 11	at Philadelphia	W 91–84	Ralph Beard (20)		3–2
6	November 12	St. Louis	W 94–71	Alex Groza (26)		4–2
7	November 13	at Sheboygan	L 101–104	Alex Groza (30)		4–3
8	November 15	Anderson	L 72–83	Alex Groza (22)		4–4
9	November 17	at Boston	L 68–90	Alex Groza (21)		4–5
10	November 19	Waterloo	W 106–74	Ralph Beard (27)		5–5
11	November 20	at Minneapolis	L 95–121	Ralph Beard (24)		5–6
12	November 22	Rochester	W 80–74	Alex Groza (43)		6–6
13	November 23	at Chicago	L 72–92	Wallace Jones (22)		6–7
14	November 26	Sheboygan	W 85–59	Alex Groza (20)		7–7
15	November 27	at Tri-Cities	L 88–104	Alex Groza (21)		7–8
16	November 29	Tri-Cities	W 92–76	Alex Groza (28)		8–8
17	December 1	Minnesota	W 86–68	Alex Groza (38)		9–8
18	December 3	at Rochester	L 77–99	Alex Groza (21)		9–9
19	December 4	at Syracuse	L 61–67	Alex Groza (26)		9–10
20	December 6	Boston	W 93–82	Alex Groza (22)		10–10
21	December 8	at Anderson	W 72–69	Alex Groza (30)		11–10
22	December 9	Denver	W 78–75	Alex Groza (18)		12–10
23	December 11	at Fort Wayne	L 74–90	Alex Groza (22)		12–11
24	December 13	Tri-Cities	W 84–63	Alex Groza (21)		13–11
25	December 16	at Denver	W 81–79	Alex Groza (29)		14–11
26	December 18	at Denver	W 83–79	Alex Groza (22)		15–11
27	December 20	Baltimore	L 79–88	Alex Groza (27)		15–12
28	December 22	Chicago	W 104–92	Alex Groza (42)		16–12
29	December 25	at Waterloo	L 93–97	Alex Groza (28)		16–13
30	December 27	Anderson	W 89–82	Bruce Hale (17)		17–13
31	January 1	at Sheboygan	W 89–75	Alex Groza (27)		18–13
32	January 3	Tri-Cities	W 78–76	Wallace Jones (24)		19–13
33	January 7	at Baltimore	W 85–61	Alex Groza (22)		20–13
34	January 10	Sheboygan	W 107–77	Alex Groza (25)		21–13
35	January 13	Waterloo	W 80–64	Alex Groza (28)		22–13
36	January 15	at Syracuse	L 69–82	Alex Groza (24)		22–14
37	January 17	Denver	W 101–81	Bruce Hale (23)		23–14
38	January 19	vs. Waterloo	W 104–87	Alex Groza (30)		24–14
39	January 21	Fort Wayne	W 112–94	Ralph Beard (31)		25–14
40	January 24	Waterloo	W 107–69	Alex Groza (28)		26–14
41	January 27	at Anderson	W 91–78	Groza, Jones (23)		27–14
42	January 28	at Tri-Cities	L 81–97	Alex Groza (20)		27–15
43	January 30	vs. Syracuse	L 75–91	Alex Groza (19)		27–16
44	February 2	Syracuse	L 67–73	Alex Groza (20)		27–17
45	February 5	at St. Louis	L 64–76	Wallace Jones (18)		27–18
46	February 7	Washington	W 88–81	Wallace Jones (18)		28–18
47	February 10	Anderson	L 76–107	Alex Groza (25)		28–19
48	February 12	at Tri-Cities	W 95–89	Alex Groza (25)		29–19
49	February 14	Philadelphia	W 86–67	Alex Groza (22)		30–19
50	February 15	at Waterloo	L 74–76	Ralph Beard (21)		30–20
51	February 18	at Washington	L 79–81	Alex Groza (26)		30–21
52	February 19	at Syracuse	L 78–82	Alex Groza (22)		30–22
53	February 21	Sheboygan	L 78–83	Groza, Jones (17)		30–23
54	February 24	vs Syracuse	L 67–72	Ralph Beard (18)		30–24
55	February 26	at Sheboygan	W 107–86	Ralph Beard (34)		31–24
56	February 28	Syracuse	W 110–72	Alex Groza (29)		32–24
57	March 3	Tri-Cities	L 83–96	Wallace Jones (32)		32–25
58	March 5	at Sheboygan	W 92–87	Alex Groza (31)		33–25
59	March 7	Anderson	W 107–93	Ralph Beard (30)		34–25
60	March 9	at Anderson	W 97–90	Barker, Groza (19)		35–25
61	March 12	Waterloo	W 90–89	Alex Groza (29)		36–25
62	March 14	Syracuse	W 68–65	Alex Groza (28)		37–25
63	March 16	vs. Denver	W 111–99	Alex Groza (36)		38–25
64	March 18	vs. Denver	W 110–73	Ralph Beard (23)		39–25

== Playoffs ==
=== Western Division Semifinals ===
(1) Indianapolis Olympians vs. (4) Sheboygan Red Skins: Olympians win series 2-1

- Game 1 @ Indianapolis (March 21): Indianapolis 86, Sheboygan 85
- Game 2 @ Sheboygan (March 23): Sheboygan 95, Indianapolis 85
- Game 3 @ Indianapolis (March 25): Indianapolis 91, Sheboygan 84

This was the first and only playoff meeting between the Olympians and Red Skins.

=== Western Division Finals ===
(1) Indianapolis Olympians vs. (2) Anderson Packers: Packers win series 2-1

- Game 1 @ Indianapolis (March 28): Indianapolis 77, Anderson 74
- Game 2 @ Anderson (March 30): Anderson 84, Indianapolis 67
- Game 3 @ Indianapolis (April 1): Anderson 67, Indianapolis 65

This was the first and only playoff meeting between the Olympians and Packers.
