= Don Hanrahan =

American basketball player

Personal information
- Born: February 6, 1929 Chicago, Illinois, U.S.
- Died: February 8, 2010 (aged 81) Cos Cob, Connecticut, U.S.
- Listed height: 6 ft 7 in (2.01 m)
- Listed weight: 200 lb (91 kg)

Career information
- High school: Foreman (Chicago, Illinois)
- College: Loyola Chicago (1949–1952)
- NBA draft: 1952: undrafted
- Position: Forward
- Number: 18

Career history
- 1952–1953: Indianapolis Olympians
- Stats at NBA.com
- Stats at Basketball Reference

Donald Eugene Hanrahan (February 6, 1929 – February 8, 2010) was an American professional basketball forward who spent one season in the National Basketball Association (NBA) as a member of the Indianapolis Olympians during the 1952–53 season. He attended Loyola University of Chicago.

== Career statistics ==
Legend
GP	Games played	GS	Games started	MPG	Minutes per game
FG%	Field goal percentage	3P%	3-point field goal percentage	FT%	Free throw percentage
RPG	Rebounds per game	APG	Assists per game	SPG	Steals per game
BPG	Blocks per game	PPG	Points per game	**Bold**	Career high

=== NBA ===
==== Regular season ====
Year	Team	GP	MPG	FG%	FT%	RPG	APG	PPG
1952–53	Indianapolis	18	6.7	.344	.733	1.7	.6	1.8
