= 1927 in basketball =

The following are the basketball events of the year 1927 throughout the world.

== Events ==
- The Harlem Globetrotters play their first game.

== Championships ==
Men

- (United States) AAU
  - Hillyard Chemical 29, Ke-Nash-A 10

== Births ==
- March 11 — Vince Boryla, NBA player, coach and executive (died 2016)
- December 2 — Ralph Beard, All-American at Kentucky. Two-time National Champion and Olympic Gold Medalist (died 2007)
