= 1952–53 Indianapolis Olympians season =

- Head coach: Herm Schaefer
- Arena: Hinkle Fieldhouse

Results
- Record: 28–43 (.394)
- Place: Division: 4th (Western)
- Playoff finish: West Division Semifinals (eliminated 0-2)
- Stats at Basketball Reference
- Radio: WXLW

The 1952-53 Indianapolis Olympians season was the Olympians' 4th and final season in the NBA. Leo Barnhorst and Joe Graboski led the team in scoring; while Graborski dominated on the boards. Despite the Olympians struggling with their worst season as a franchise following the aftermath of the 1951 college basketball point-shaving scandal that led to two of their best players (Alex Groza and Ralph Beard) being banned for life by the NBA, the Olympians would still barely qualify for the 1953 NBA playoffs due to them being one game ahead of the Milwaukee Hawks for the last playoff spot in the Western Division. However, they would be quickly swept and eliminated by the eventual two-time (later three-time) defending NBA champion Minneapolis Lakers in the Western Division Semifinals due to Indianapolis' poor 28–43 record being far too reflective of the difference in talent between the Lakers and Olympians franchises by this point in time. Following the conclusion of the playoffs, the Olympians franchise would fold on April 23, 1953, despite their consistent successes as a team due to the financial burdens following the 1951 college basketball point-shaving scandal being far too much for the franchise to overcome in the end. As a result of their folding, the Olympians would be the last NBL-adjacent franchise out of the five currently surviving franchises that started out within the NBL to fold operations entirely within the NBA.

== Draft picks ==
Round	Pick	Player	Position(s)	Nationality	College
1	4	Joe Dean	SG	United States	LSU
2	14	Zeke Zawoluk	PF/C	United States	St. John's
3	24	Skippy Whitaker	PG	United States	Kentucky
4	34	Gene Rhodes	PG	United States	Western Kentucky
5	44	Jay Handlan	SF	United States	Washington & Lee
6	54	Billy Harrell	PG	United States	St. Bernadine of Siena
7	64	Jim Hoverder	PF/C	United States	Central Missouri State
8	74	Gordon C. Stauffer	PG	United States	Michigan State
9	83	Dale Toft	F	United States	Denver

Indianapolis would only utilize nine out of the 17 total rounds of this draft before opting out of using the rest of the available rounds entirely. This draft would later become the Olympians' final draft that they would ever do as a franchise. While they were initially slated to appear in the 1953 NBA draft, the Olympians franchise would end up folding operations the day before the 1953 draft officially began following the aftermath of former Olympians players Ralph Beard and Alex Groza's involvement in the CCNY point-shaving scandal back when they were college players for the University of Kentucky, thus leaving the NBA with only nine operable teams by the start of the following year's draft.

== Regular season ==
=== Season standings ===
Western Division	W	L	PCT	GB	Home	Road	Neutral	Div
x-Minneapolis Lakers	48	22	.686	-	24–2	16–15	8–5	17–13
x-Rochester Royals	44	26	.629	4	24–8	13–17	7–1	27–13
x-Fort Wayne Pistons	36	33	.522	11.5	25–9	8–19	3–5	18–22
x-Indianapolis Olympians	28	43	.394	20.5	19–14	4–23	5–6	15–26
Milwaukee Hawks	27	44	.380	21.5	14–8	3–24	10–12	15–26

=== Game log ===
1952–53 Game log
#	Date	Opponent	Score	High points	Record
1	October 31	Boston	83–68	Bob Lavoy (20)	0–1
2	November 1	@ Milwaukee	71–73	Leo Barnhorst (20)	0–2
3	November 7	Rochester	65–63	Leo Barnhorst (22)	0–3
4	November 8	@ Rochester	96–99 (4OT)	Leo Barnhorst (22)	0–4
5	November 9	@ Fort Wayne	71–74	Graboski, Walther (16)	0–5
6	November 11	Fort Wayne	63–78	Joe Graboski (23)	1–5
7	November 14	@ Philadelphia	77–71	Bob Lavoy (17)	2–5
8	November 15	N Philadelphia	76–79	Joe Graboski (18)	3–5
9	November 16	@ Syracuse	78–84	Barnhorst, Tosheff (15)	3–6
10	November 18	New York	90–100	Joe Graboski (23)	4–6
11	November 20	N New York	72–67	Joe Graboski (21)	4–7
12	November 22	@ Boston	91–96 (OT)	Leo Barnhorst (24)	4–8
13	November 23	@ Baltimore	100–90	Barnhorst, Tosheff (23)	5–8
14	November 25	Milwaukee	78–66	Leo Barnhorst (14)	5–9
15	November 27	@ Minneapolis	69–90	Leo Barnhorst (19)	5–10
16	November 28	Minneapolis	97–82	Joe Graboski (22)	5–11
17	November 29	@ New York	72–94	Bill Tosheff (15)	5–12
18	December 2	Rochester	76–85	Barnhorst, Graboski (19)	6–12
19	December 5	Fort Wayne	74–84	Barnhorst, Walther (17)	7–12
20	December 6	@ Rochester	79–82	Bill Tosheff (18)	7–13
21	December 8	N Minneapolis	76–81	Joe Graboski (20)	8–13
22	December 9	Syracuse	87–70	Leo Barnhorst (20)	8–14
23	December 12	Milwaukee	49–63	Paul Walther (19)	9–14
24	December 14	@ Fort Wayne	71–86	Barnhorst, Graboski (14)	9–15
25	December 16	Rochester	84–71	Graboski, Lavoy (15)	9–16
26	December 19	Minneapolis	87–69	Bob Lavoy (14)	9–17
27	December 21	N Rochester	83–65	Mel Payton (16)	9–18
28	December 23	Fort Wayne	59–72	Bill Tosheff (19)	10–18
29	December 25	@ Minneapolis	73–90	Mel Payton (16)	10–19
30	December 26	Boston	74–85	Joe Graboski (25)	11–19
31	December 27	@ Rochester	73–94	Bill Tosheff (22)	11–20
32	December 28	@ Syracuse	73–84	Joe Graboski (12)	11–21
33	December 30	Minneapolis	69–74	Joe Graboski (19)	12–21
34	December 31	@ Fort Wayne	85–91	Mel Payton (22)	12–22
35	January 2	Baltimore	66–73	Joe Graboski (24)	13–22
36	January 3	N Boston	63–78	Joe Graboski (17)	13–23
37	January 6	Philadelphia	76–71	Joe Graboski (15)	13–24
38	January 9	New York	58–54	Gene Rhodes (15)	13–25
39	January 11	@ Fort Wayne	68–72	Gene Rhodes (16)	13–26
40	January 15	N Milwaukee	68–75	Leo Barnhorst (22)	14–26
41	January 16	N Fort Wayne	68–75	Joe Graboski (15)	14–27
42	January 17	@ Baltimore	66–82	Mel Payton (17)	14–28
43	January 18	N Philadelphia	74–76 (OT)	Paul Walther (16)	15–28
44	January 20	Rochester	59–70	Joe Graboski (15)	16–28
45	January 23	Boston	85–90	Joe Graboski (20)	17–28
46	January 24	@ Milwaukee	64–72	Leo Barnhorst (22)	17–29
47	January 27	Syracuse	72–76	Bob Lavoy (18)	18–29
48	January 31	@ Baltimore	90–97	Leo Barnhorst (24)	18–30
49	February 3	Minneapolis	93–96 (3OT)	Leo Barnhorst (27)	19–30
50	February 5	@ Fort Wayne	63–68	Bill Tosheff (21)	19–31
51	February 6	New York	84–73	Leo Barnhorst (14)	19–32
52	February 8	@ Minneapolis	67–71	Paul Walther (20)	19–33
53	February 10	Baltimore	83–88	Leo Barnhorst (19)	20–33
54	February 11	N Milwaukee	67–65 (OT)	Lavoy, Tosheff (10)	20–34
55	February 13	Syracuse	89–86 (2OT)	Leo Barnhorst (19)	20–35
56	February 14	@ New York	79–91	Zeke Zawoluk (22)	20–36
57	February 15	@ Boston	76–89	Leo Barnhorst (26)	20–37
58	February 17	Philadelphia	77–80	Leo Barnhorst (23)	21–37
59	February 20	Baltimore	58–59	Mel Payton (17)	22–37
60	February 21	N Milwaukee	61–60	Leo Barnhorst (22)	22–38
61	February 22	@ Milwaukee	64–71	Gene Rhodes (18)	22–39
62	February 24	Milwaukee	69–71 (OT)	Zeke Zawoluk (16)	23–39
63	March 3	Philadelphia	73–90	Leo Barnhorst (26)	24–39
64	March 6	Fort Wayne	73–64	Leo Barnhorst (20)	24–40
65	March 9	N Minneapolis	83–95	Mel Payton (19)	25–40
66	March 10	Rochester	61–59	Joe Graboski (16)	25–41
67	March 13	Milwaukee	50–52 (OT)	Leo Barnhorst (12)	26–41
68	March 14	@ Rochester	90–82	Joe Graboski (25)	27–41
69	March 15	@ Syracuse	68–84	Joe Graboski (19)	27–42
70	March 17	Minneapolis	73–71	Joe Graboski (23)	27–43
71	March 18	@ Milwaukee	74–69	Bill Tosheff (18)	28–43

== Playoffs ==
=== West Division Semifinals ===
(1) Minneapolis Lakers vs. (4) Indianapolis Olympians: Lakers win series 2-0

- Game 1 @ Minneapolis: Minneapolis 85, Indianapolis 69
- Game 2 @ Indianapolis: Minneapolis 81, Indianapolis 79

Last Playoff Meeting: 1952 Western Division Semifinals (Minneapolis won 2–0)

This was the third and final playoff meeting between the Lakers and the Olympians.

== Player statistics ==
Legend
GP	Games played	GS	Games started	MPG	Minutes per game
FG%	Field-goal percentage	3P%	3-point field-goal percentage	FT%	Free-throw percentage
RPG	Rebounds per game	APG	Assists per game	SPG	Steals per game
BPG	Blocks per game	PPG	Points per game

== Dispersal Draft ==
After the Olympians franchise folded operations on April 23, 1953 (one day before the 1953 NBA draft began), a few of their players were dispersed to other teams throughout the 1953 free agency period. Joe Graboski and Paul Walther were sent off to the Philadelphia Warriors during the month of May 1953, while Bob Lavoy and Bill Tosheff went to the Milwaukee Hawks on August 22 that year and Leo Barnhorst went to the Baltimore Bullets on September 2, 1953.
