= 1950–51 Indianapolis Olympians season =

- Head coach: Cliff Barker (24–32); Wally Jones (7–5)
- Arena: Butler Fieldhouse

Results
- Record: 31–37 (.456)
- Place: Division: 4th (Western)
- Playoff finish: West Division Semifinals (eliminated 1–2)
- Stats at Basketball Reference
- Radio: WXLW

The 1950–51 Indianapolis Olympians season was the Olympians' 2nd season in the NBA. One lesser known aspect regarding this season involves how an NBA referee named Sol Levy would successfully rig a game involving the Olympians on November 12, 1950, to have them lose their match to the Boston Celtics instead, which later led to him being caught in the act and arrested as an eventual accomplice in the CCNY point-shaving scandal of 1951. Despite finishing this season with a worse 31–37 record in a newly realigned Western Division, the Olympians would qualify for the NBA playoffs once again for the revised formatting for the 1951 NBA playoffs due to their record being much better than that of the Tri-Cities Blackhawks (who would later move to Milwaukee to become the Milwaukee Hawks for the following season of play), though they would lose in the Western Division Semifinals in a close 2–1 series defeat to the three-time defending NBL/BAA/NBA champion Minneapolis Lakers, who later on lost to the eventual new champions of the NBA this season in the Rochester Royals.

== NBA draft ==
Round	Pick	Player	Position	Nationality	College
1	8	Bob Lavoy	F/C	United States	Western Kentucky
2	20	Paul Unruh	F	United States	Bradley
3	32	Chuck Mrazovich	F	United States	Eastern Kentucky
6	68	Ralph O'Brien	G	United States	Butler
7	80	Leon Blevins	G	United States	Arizona

== Roster ==
1950–51 Indianapolis Olympians roster
Players

Pos.	No.	Player	Height	Weight	DOB	From
SG	10	Cliff Barker	6 ft 2 in (1.88 m)	185 lb (84 kg)		Kentucky
SF	20	Leo Barnhorst	6 ft 4 in (1.93 m)	190 lb (86 kg)		Notre Dame
G	12	Ralph Beard	5 ft 10 in (1.78 m)	175 lb (79 kg)		Kentucky
G	9	Leon Blevins	6 ft 2 in (1.88 m)	160 lb (73 kg)		Arizona
C	15	Alex Groza	6 ft 7 in (2.01 m)	218 lb (99 kg)		Kentucky
G/F	7	Bruce Hale	6 ft 1 in (1.85 m)	170 lb (77 kg)		Santa Clara
SF	14	Joe Holland	6 ft 4 in (1.93 m)	185 lb (84 kg)		Kentucky
PF	17	Wallace Jones	6 ft 4 in (1.93 m)	225 lb (102 kg)		Kentucky
PF	8	Bob Lavoy	6 ft 7 in (2.01 m)	185 lb (84 kg)		Western Kentucky
F/C	18	Don Lofgran	6 ft 5 in (1.96 m)	200 lb (91 kg)		San Francisco
C	19	John Mahnken	6 ft 8 in (2.03 m)	220 lb (100 kg)		Georgetown
F/C	16	Mal McMullen	6 ft 5 in (1.96 m)	210 lb (95 kg)		Xavier
F	19	Chuck Mrazovich	6 ft 5 in (1.96 m)	185 lb (84 kg)		Eastern Kentucky
G/F	18	Carl Shaeffer	6 ft 3 in (1.91 m)	185 lb (84 kg)		Alabama
SG	5	Paul Walther	6 ft 2 in (1.88 m)	160 lb (73 kg)		Tennessee

Coaches
Head coach
- Cliff Barker
  Wally Jones

Legend
- (DP) Unsigned draft pick
- (FA) Free agent
- (S) Suspended
- Injured

== Regular season ==
=== Season standings ===
Western Division	W	L	PCT	GB	Home	Road	Neutral	Div
x-Minneapolis Lakers	44	24	.647	–	29–3	12–21	3–0	24–12
x-Rochester Royals	41	27	.603	3	29–5	12–22	–	18–15
x-Fort Wayne Pistons	32	36	.471	12	27–7	5–27	0–2	18–6
x-Indianapolis Olympians	31	37	.456	13	19–12	10–24	2–1	15–20
Tri-Cities Blackhawks	25	43	.368	19	22–13	2–28	1–2	12–24

=== Game log ===
1950–51 Game log
#	Date	Opponent	Score	High points	Location	Record
1	November 1	@ Washington	L 84–100	Alex Groza (23)		0–1
2	November 4	@ Baltimore	L 86–102	Alex Groza (26)		0–2
3	November 5	@ Fort Wayne	L 63–68	Alex Groza (31)		0–3
4	November 7	New York	W 86–73	Alex Groza (18)		1–3
5	November 9	@ New York	W 85–73	Bob Lavoy (23)		2–3
6	November 12	@ Boston	L 75–78	Ralph Beard (22)		2–4
7	November 14	Syracuse	W 108–78	Bob Lavoy (21)		3–4
8	November 16	@ Philadelphia	L 67–85	Alex Groza (23)		3–5
9	November 18	Tri-Cities	W 74–67	Alex Groza (17)		4–5
10	November 19	@ Tri-Cities	L 81–104	Alex Groza (16)		4–6
11	November 21	Rochester	W 91–79	Alex Groza (32)		5–6
12	November 23	@ Syracuse	W 92–85	Ralph Beard (25)		6–6
13	November 25	Baltimore	W 92–81	Alex Groza (23)		7–6
14	November 26	@ Fort Wayne	L 70–79	Alex Groza (21)		7–7
15	November 28	Fort Wayne	W 90–66	Alex Groza (25)		8–7
16	December 1	Minneapolis	W 66–65	Ralph Beard (18)		9–7
17	December 2	@ Rochester	L 72–94	Bob Lavoy (15)		9–8
18	December 3	@ Syracuse	L 81–84	Alex Groza (18)		9–9
19	December 5	New York	W 95–89	Ralph Beard (20)		10–9
20	December 6	@ Washington	W 101–79	Wallace Jones (34)		11–9
21	December 7	@ Philadelphia	L 73–102	Alex Groza (18)		11–10
22	December 10	@ New York	L 84–106	Alex Groza (33)		11–11
23	December 12	Tri-Cities	W 75–74	Ralph Beard (21)		12–11
24	December 15	Minneapolis	L 71–82	Alex Groza (19)		12–12
25	December 17	@ Minneapolis	L 60–79	Alex Groza (20)		12–13
26	December 19	Fort Wayne	L 92–93	Alex Groza (34)		12–14
27	December 23	@ Washington	W 87–79 (OT)	Paul Walther (17)		13–14
28	December 26	Washington	L 81–88	Alex Groza (27)		13–15
29	December 29	Tri-Cities	W 112–81	Ralph Beard (28)		14–15
30	January 2	Philadelphia	L 86–87 (OT)	Beard, Groza (19)		14–16
31	January 4	@ Fort Wayne	W 94–83	Ralph Beard (28)		15–16
32	January 6	@ Rochester	W 75–73 (6OT)	Beard, Groza (17)		16–16
33	January 7	@ Tri-Cities	L 79–83	Alex Groza (20)		16–17
34	January 9	Rochester	L 59–77	Alex Groza (19)		16–18
35	January 12	Fort Wayne	L 81–89	Bob Lavoy (18)		16–19
36	January 14	@ Minneapolis	L 84–86 (OT)	Ralph Beard (22)		16–20
37	January 16	Minneapolis	W 82–68	Alex Groza (19)		17–20
38	January 18	@ Philadelphia	L 80–114	Alex Groza (24)		17–21
39	January 20	@ Baltimore	L 63–102	Alex Groza (24)		17–22
40	January 23	Boston	L 79–83 (OT)	Ralph Beard (27)		17–23
41	January 26	Philadelphia	W 78–75	Alex Groza (27)		18–23
42	January 28	@ Minneapolis	L 75–101	Alex Groza (24)		18–24
43	January 29	Tri-Cities	W 87–85	Alex Groza (30)		19–24
44	January 31	Rochester	W 68–63	Alex Groza (28)		20–24
45	February 3	Minneapolis	L 84–89	Alex Groza (21)		20–25
46	February 4	@ New York	W 105–83	Ralph Beard (31)		21–25
47	February 5	vs. Boston	L 57–70	Ralph Beard (24)		21–26
48	February 6	Rochester	W 78–76	Ralph Beard (24)		22–26
49	February 10	Philadelphia	L 78–88	Alex Groza (25)		22–27
50	February 11	@ Minneapolis	L 78–91	Alex Groza (21)		22–28
51	February 13	Fort Wayne	W 80–78	Beard, Groza (21)		23–28
52	February 14	@ Tri-Cities	L 91–98	Alex Groza (24)		23–29
53	February 15	vs. Baltimore	W 69–60	Alex Groza (24)		24–29
54	February 16	Minneapolis	L 71–76	Ralph Beard (24)		24–30
55	February 18	@ Boston	L 75–78	Beard, Groza (17)		24–31
56	February 20	Syracuse	L 79–81	Alex Groza (29)		24–32
57	February 25	@ Minneapolis	W 75–73	Alex Groza (19)		25–32
58	February 27	Baltimore	W 96–74	Ralph Beard (32)		26–32
59	March 4	@ Tri-Cities	L 72–87	Ralph Beard (20)		26–33
60	March 6	Boston	W 75–73	Alex Groza (20)		27–33
61	March 8	@ Syracuse	L 97–121	Alex Groza (27)		27–34
62	March 9	Rochester	L 84–91	Alex Groza (23)		27–35
63	March 11	@ Rochester	W 95–88	Ralph Beard (35)		28–35
64	March 13	Syracuse	W 98–93	Alex Groza (28)		29–35
65	March 14	@ Fort Wayne	L 109–115	Alex Groza (35)		29–36
66	March 15	New York	W 74–70	Alex Groza (26)		30–36
67	March 17	@ Baltimore	W 92–91	Alex Groza (37)		31–36
68	March 18	@ Rochester	L 79–91	Ralph Beard (22)		31–37

== Playoffs ==
=== West Division Semifinals ===
(1) Minneapolis Lakers vs. (4) Indianapolis Olympians: Lakers win series 2-1

- Game 1 @ Minneapolis: Minneapolis 95, Indianapolis 81
- Game 2 @ Indianapolis: Indianapolis 108, Minneapolis 88
- Game 3 @ Minneapolis: Minneapolis 85, Indianapolis 80

== Awards and records ==
- Alex Groza, All-NBA First Team
- Ralph Beard, All-NBA First Team
