= Chuck Mrazovich =

American basketball player (1924–2020)

Personal information
- Born: February 26, 1924 Ambridge, Pennsylvania, U.S.
- Died: November 8, 2020 (aged 96) Hialeah, Florida, U.S.
- Listed height: 6 ft 5 in (1.96 m)
- Listed weight: 185 lb (84 kg)

Career information
- High school: Ambridge Area (Ambridge, Pennsylvania)
- College: Eastern Kentucky (1947–1950)
- NBA draft: 1950: 3rd round, 32nd overall pick
- Drafted by: Indianapolis Olympians
- Playing career: 1950–1953
- Position: Forward
- Number: 19

Career history
- 1950: Anderson Packers
- 1950–1951: Indianapolis Olympians
- 1951–1953: Wilkes-Barre Barons
- Stats at NBA.com
- Stats at Basketball Reference

Charles Mrazovich (February 26, 1924 – November 8, 2020) was an American professional basketball player. Mrazovich was selected in the third round of the 1950 NBA draft by the Indianapolis Olympians after a collegiate career at Eastern Kentucky. In addition to competing on the basketball team, Mrazovich also competed on Eastern Kentucky's track and field team.

Mrazovich died in November 2020 at the age of 96.

== Career statistics ==
Legend
GP	Games played	GS	Games started	MPG	Minutes per game
FG%	Field goal percentage	3P%	3-point field goal percentage	FT%	Free throw percentage
RPG	Rebounds per game	APG	Assists per game	SPG	Steals per game
BPG	Blocks per game	PPG	Points per game	**Bold**	Career high

=== NBA ===
==== Regular season ====
Year	Team	GP	FG%	FT%	RPG	APG	PPG
1950–51	Indianapolis	25	.350	.604	1.6	.5	3.4
