= Floyd Volker =

American basketball player (1921–1995)

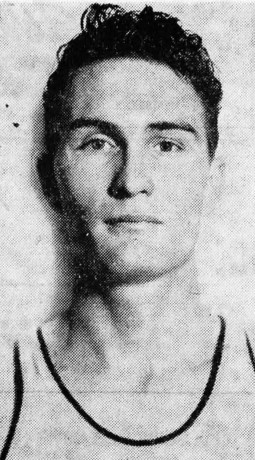

Personal information
- Born: June 21, 1921 Casper, Wyoming, U.S.
- Died: January 5, 1995 (aged 73) Casper, Wyoming, U.S.
- Listed height: 6 ft 4 in (1.93 m)
- Listed weight: 205 lb (93 kg)

Career information
- High school: Casper (Casper, Wyoming)
- College: Wyoming (1941–1943, 1946–1947)
- BAA draft: 1947: undrafted
- Playing career: 1947–1951
- Position: Power forward / center
- Number: 20, 29

Career history
- 1947–1949: Oshkosh All-Stars
- 1949: Indianapolis Olympians
- 1949–1950: Denver Nuggets
- 1950–1951: Denver Refiners

Career highlights
- NCAA champion (1943)
- Stats at NBA.com
- Stats at Basketball Reference

Floyd William Volker (June 21, 1921 – January 5, 1995) was an American basketball player. He played professionally in the National Basketball League (NBL), the National Professional Basketball League (NPBL), and in the National Basketball Association (NBA) in the early days of professional basketball.

Volker, a 6'4 forward from Casper High School in Casper, Wyoming, went on to play collegiately at the University of Wyoming. He was a starting forward on the Cowboys' 1943 national championship team as a junior. After a pause in his career to serve in the US military during World War II, Volker returned to campus for his senior year in 1946–47.

After his college playing days, Volker signed with the Oshkosh All-Stars of the NBL in 1947. In 1949, when the NBL and the Basketball Association of America merged to form the NBA, the All-Stars were disbanded and Volker was assigned to the Indianapolis Olympians for the inaugural season of the NBA. During the season, his rights were sold to the Denver Nuggets. He averaged 7.4 points and 2.1 assists in his lone NBA season. He then played one season in the short-lived NPBL in 1950–51 until the demise of that league at the end of the season.

Volker died in January 1995, aged 73.

== Career statistics ==
Legend
GP	Games played	GS	Games started	MPG	Minutes per game
FG%	Field goal percentage	3P%	3-point field goal percentage	FT%	Free throw percentage
RPG	Rebounds per game	APG	Assists per game	SPG	Steals per game
BPG	Blocks per game	PPG	Points per game	**Bold**	Career high

=== NBA ===
==== Regular season ====
Year	Team	GP	FG%	FT%	APG	PPG
1949–50	Indianapolis	17	**.321**	.389	.4	2.4
1949–50	Denver	**37**	.308	**.577**	**2.8**	**9.6**
Career		54	.309	.550	2.1	7.4
