= Bob Lavoy =

American basketball player and coach

Personal information
- Born: June 29, 1926 Aurora, Illinois, U.S.
- Died: December 18, 2010 (aged 84) Tampa, Florida, U.S.
- Listed height: 6 ft 7 in (2.01 m)
- Listed weight: 185 lb (84 kg)

Career information
- High school: East Aurora (Aurora, Illinois)
- College: Western Kentucky (1947–1950)
- NBA draft: 1950: 1st round, 8th overall pick
- Drafted by: Indianapolis Olympians
- Playing career: 1950–1954
- Position: Power forward / center
- Number: 8, 16

Career history

Playing
- 1950–1953: Indianapolis Olympians
- 1953: Milwaukee Hawks
- 1953–1954: Syracuse Nationals

Coaching
- 1958–1966: Tampa Spartans

Career highlights
- Second team All-American – INS (1950)

Career NBA statistics
- Points: 2,156 (8.2 ppg)
- Rebounds: 1,634 (6.2 rpg)
- Assists: 391 (1.5 apg)
- Stats at NBA.com
- Stats at Basketball Reference

Robert William Lavoy (June 29, 1926 – December 18, 2010) was an American professional basketball player and coach. Lavoy played for three years at Western Kentucky University before a short stint in the National Basketball Association. Lavoy spent most of his time in the NBA with the Indianapolis Olympians but also played a season with the Syracuse Nationals. He also coached at the University of Tampa for eight years.

== College career ==
Lavoy played his college ball at Western Kentucky University and led the Hilltoppers to a 78–12 record during his three years in Bowling Green. He helped Western Kentucky capture a Kentucky Intercollegiate Conference title and two Ohio Valley Conference championships. Lavoy and the Hilltoppers played in the National Invitational Tournament three years in a row. The closest the Hilltoppers came to winning the NIT was in 1948 when the Hilltoppers fell in the semifinals to Saint Louis University 60–53. Saint Louis was led by future member of the Basketball Hall of Fame, Ed Macauley.

Lavoy was inducted into the Western Kentucky Athletic Hall of Fame, the Illinois Athletic Hall of Fame and the East Aurora High School.

== Professional career ==
Lavoy was drafted by the Indianapolis Olympians with the 9th overall pick in the 1950 NBA draft. Lavoy started for the Olympians for three seasons and was 10th in the league in field goal percentage in 1952 and 9th in 1953. The Olympians folded after the 1952–53 season and Lavoy was selected by the Milwaukee Hawks in the dispersal draft. He never played a game for the Hawks though, and was traded to the Syracuse Nationals for Noble Jorgensen. Lavoy only played one season in Syracuse and in that season, the Nationals lost in the 1954 NBA Finals to the Minneapolis Lakers in seven games. During his four-year career in the NBA, Lavoy averaged 27 minutes a game, 8.2 points a game (.384 FG%, .707 FT%), 6.2 rebounds a game and 1.5 assists a game.

== Career statistics ==
Legend
GP	Games played	GS	Games started	MPG	Minutes per game
FG%	Field goal percentage	3P%	3-point field goal percentage	FT%	Free throw percentage
RPG	Rebounds per game	APG	Assists per game	SPG	Steals per game
BPG	Blocks per game	PPG	Points per game	**Bold**	Career high
*	Led the league

=== NBA ===
==== Regular season ====
Year	Team	GP	MPG	FG%	FT%	RPG	APG	PPG
1950–51	Indianapolis	63		.357	.632	4.9	1.2	8.3
1951–52	Indianapolis	63	29.0	.397	**.753**	**7.6**	1.7	**10.3**
1952–53	Indianapolis	**70**	**33.2**	.402	.694	7.5	**1.9**	8.8
1953–54	Milwaukee	8	15.6	**.444**	.563	3.8	1.3	5.1
1953–54	Syracuse	60	19.2	.372	.752	4.8	1.1	5.4
Career		264	27.0	.384	.707	6.2	1.5	8.4

==== Playoffs ====
Year	Team	GP	MPG	FG%	FT%	RPG	APG	PPG
1951	Indianapolis	3		.000	.600	2.0	1.3	1.0
1952	Indianapolis	2	**39.0**	.333	.750	**10.0**	**2.0**	**12.0**
1953	Indianapolis	2	23.5	.250	.400	5.0	1.0	5.0
1954	Syracuse	**13***	27.5	**.389**	**.800**	6.5	1.5	9.1
Career		20	28.4	.345	.753	6.1	1.5	7.8
