= Mal McMullen =

American basketball player

Personal information
- Born: August 23, 1927 Fostoria, Ohio, U.S.
- Died: April 13, 1995 (aged 67) Kokomo, Indiana, U.S.
- Listed height: 6 ft 5 in (1.96 m)
- Listed weight: 210 lb (95 kg)

Career information
- High school: Hamilton (Hamilton, Ohio)
- College: Kentucky (1945–1947); Xavier (1948–1949)
- BAA draft: 1949: 6th round, 57th overall pick
- Drafted by: Baltimore Bullets
- Position: Center / forward
- Number: 16

Career history
- 1949–1951: Indianapolis Olympians
- Stats at NBA.com
- Stats at Basketball Reference

Malcolm H. McMullen (August 23, 1927 – April 13, 1995) was an American professional basketball player. He played for two seasons in the National Basketball Association for the Indianapolis Olympians and averaged 4.8 points per game for his career.

McMullen was also a golf professional in his post-basketball life and won several tournaments including the Indiana Open in 1974. He was the professional at Kokomo Country Club in Kokomo, Indiana from 1960 to 1992. He was inducted into the Indiana Golf Hall of Fame in 1981.

== Golf tournament wins ==
- 1974 Indiana Open
- 1979 Indiana PGA Senior Championship
- 1980 Indiana PGA Championship, Indiana PGA Senior Championship
- 1984 Indiana PGA Senior Open
- 1991 Indiana PGA Senior Championship

== Career statistics ==
Legend
GP	Games played	GS	Games started	MPG	Minutes per game
FG%	Field goal percentage	3P%	3-point field goal percentage	FT%	Free throw percentage
RPG	Rebounds per game	APG	Assists per game	SPG	Steals per game
BPG	Blocks per game	PPG	Points per game	**Bold**	Career high

=== NBA ===
==== Regular season ====
Year	Team	GP	FG%	FT%	RPG	APG	PPG
1949–50	Indianapolis	**58**	**.324**	.546	–	**1.5**	**5.6**
1950–51	Indianapolis	51	.282	**.585**	2.5	.6	4.0
Career		109	.306	.561	2.5	1.1	4.8

==== Playoffs ====
Year	Team	GP	FG%	FT%	RPG	APG	PPG
1949–50	Indianapolis	6	.190	.667	–	1.5	2.3
