= Bruce Hale =

American basketball player and coach

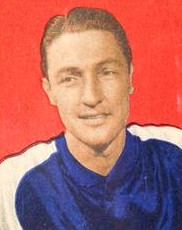
- Hale in 1948

Personal information
- Born: August 30, 1918 Medford, Oregon, U.S.
- Died: December 30, 1980 (aged 62) Orinda, California, U.S.
- Listed height: 6 ft 1 in (1.85 m)
- Listed weight: 170 lb (77 kg)

Career information
- High school: Galileo (San Francisco, California)
- College: Santa Clara (1938–1941)
- Playing career: 1946–1951
- Position: Guard / forward
- Number: 22, 35, 7
- Coaching career: 1946–1973

Career history

Playing
- 1946–1947: Chicago American Gears
- 1947–1948: St. Paul Saints
- 1947–1948: Indianapolis Kautskys
- 1948: Indianapolis Jets
- 1948–1949: Fort Wayne Pistons
- 1949–1951: Indianapolis Olympians

Coaching
- 1946–1947: Chicago American Gears (interim)
- 1947–1948: St. Paul Saints
- 1948: Indianapolis Jets
- 1954–1967: Miami (Florida)
- 1967–1968: Oakland Oaks
- 1970–1973: Saint Mary's

Career highlights
- NBL champion (1947)
- Stats at NBA.com
- Stats at Basketball Reference

William Bruce Hale (August 30, 1918 – December 30, 1980) was an American professional basketball player and coach.

A 6'1" guard/forward from Medford, Oregon, Hale played college basketball for the Santa Clara Broncos, then played professionally in the early National Basketball Association (NBA) as a member of the Indianapolis Jets, Fort Wayne Pistons, and Indianapolis Olympians. He averaged 9.1 points per game over his NBA career. He later held coaching positions with the University of Miami, the Oakland Oaks of the American Basketball Association, and St. Mary's College of California. With Miami, he took the program to their first NCAA Division I men's basketball tournament in 1960, which would be the last for the program for 38 years. Before he died of a heart attack in 1980, he had been working as a marketing director at the KNBR radio station.

Hale's daughter, Pam, married basketball player Rick Barry, who played for Hale at the University of Miami. Through Pam, Hale is the grandfather of NBA players Brent Barry, Jon Barry, and Drew Barry.

Hale was inducted into the University of Miami Sports Hall of Fame in 1986.

== Career playing statistics ==
Legend
GP	Games played	FGM	Field-goals made
FG%	Field-goal percentage	FTM	Free-throws made
FTA	Free-throws attempted	FT%	Free-throw percentage
RPG	Rebounds per game	APG	Assists per game
PTS	Points	PPG	Points per game
**Bold**	Career high

†	Denotes seasons in which Hale's team won an NBL championship

=== NBL ===
==== Regular season ====
Year	Team	GP	FGM	FTM	FTA	FT%	PTS	PPG
1946–47†	Chicago	41	156	116	141	**.823**	428	10.4
1947–48	Indianapolis	**48**	**196**	**155**	**215**	.721	**547**	**11.4**
Career		89	352	271	356	.761	975	11.0

==== Playoffs ====
Year	Team	GP	FGM	FTM	FTA	FT%	PTS	PPG
1947†	Chicago	**11**	**35**	**24**	**30**	**.800**	**94**	8.5
1948	Indianapolis	4	21	20	25	**.800**	62	**15.5**
Career		15	56	44	55	.800	156	10.4

=== BAA/NBA ===
==== Regular season ====
Year	Team	GP	FG%	FT%	RPG	APG	PPG
1948–49	Indianapolis	18	.329	.761	–	**3.8**	**12.6**
1948–49	Fort Wayne	34	.313	.750	–	2.6	9.4
1949–50	Indianapolis	**64**	.353	**.782**	–	3.5	10.3
1950–51	Indianapolis	26	**.396**	.609	**1.9**	1.6	3.6
Career		152	.333	.763	1.9	3.0	9.1

==== Playoffs ====
Year	Team	GP	FG%	FT%	RPG	APG	PPG
1950	Indianapolis	**6**	**.350**	**.882**	–	**2.8**	**7.2**
1951	Indianapolis	1	.000	.000	.0	.0	.0
Career		7	.350	.882	.0	2.4	6.1

== Head coaching record ==
=== NBA/ABA ===
Legend
Regular season	G	Games coached	W	Games won	L	Games lost	W–L %	Win–loss %
Playoffs	PG	Playoff games	PW	Playoff wins	PL	Playoff losses	PW–L %	Playoff win–loss %

Team	Year	G	W	L	W–L%	Finish	PG	PW	PL	PW–L%	Result
Indianapolis (BAA)	1948–49	17	4	13	.235	—	—	—	—	—	(replaced)
Oakland (ABA)	1967–68	78	22	56	.282	6th in Western	—	—	—	—	Missed Playoffs
Career (overall)		95	26	69	.274		—	—	—	—	

=== College ===
Record table
Season	Team	Overall	Conference	Standing	Postseason
Miami Hurricanes (NCAA University Division independent) (1954–1967)
1954–55	Miami	9–11			
1955–56	Miami	14–12			
1956–57	Miami	13–13			
1957–58	Miami	14–8			
1958–59	Miami	18–7			
1959–60	Miami	23–4			NCAA University Division First Round
1960–61	Miami	20–7			NIT First Round
1961–62	Miami	14–12			
1962–63	Miami	23–5			NIT Quarterfinal
1963–64	Miami	20–7			NIT First Round
1964–65	Miami	22–4			
1965–66	Miami	15–11			
1966–67	Miami	15–11			
Total:		220–112 (.663)			
National champion Postseason invitational champion Conference regular season champion Conference regular season and conference tournament champion Division regular season champion Division regular season and conference tournament champion Conference tournament champion
