= Leon Blevins =

American basketball player

Personal information
- Born: June 25, 1926 Black Oak, Arkansas, U.S.
- Died: September 2, 1987 (aged 61)
- Listed height: 6 ft 2 in (1.88 m)
- Listed weight: 160 lb (73 kg)

Career information
- High school: Phoenix Union (Phoenix, Arizona)
- College: Phoenix College (1946–1948); Arizona (1948–1950)
- NBA draft: 1950: 7th round, 81st overall pick
- Drafted by: Indianapolis Olympians
- Playing career: 1950–1951
- Position: Guard
- Number: 9
- Coaching career: 1951–1979

Career history

Playing
- 1950: Indianapolis Olympians
- 1950: Grand Rapids Hornets

Coaching
- 1964–1979: Phoenix College
- Stats at NBA.com
- Stats at Basketball Reference

Leon Gravette Blevins (June 25, 1926 – September 2, 1987) was an American basketball player and coach.

== College career ==
He played collegiately for the University of Arizona after two seasons at Phoenix College, where he scored over 1000 points.

== Professional career ==
He was selected by the Indianapolis Olympians in the 7th round of the 1950 NBA draft and signed with them during the summer.

He played for the Olympians (1950–51) in the NBA for 2 games before being waived by the club in middle of November. On November 23, he signed with the Grand Rapids Hornets of the National Professional Basketball League and played 13 games with the team until it folded in late December. Later, he played with Funk Jewelers in the Phoenix Metropolitan Division.

== Coaching career ==
In 1951, Blevins started his coaching career after being hired as the head coach of Yuma High School.

== Career statistics ==
=== NBA ===
Legend
GP	Games played	GS	Games started	MPG	Minutes per game
FG%	Field goal percentage	3P%	3-point field goal percentage	FT%	Free throw percentage
RPG	Rebounds per game	APG	Assists per game	SPG	Steals per game
BPG	Blocks per game	PPG	Points per game	**Bold**	Career high

==== Regular season ====
Year	Team	GP	FG%	FT%	RPG	APG	PPG
1950–51	Indianapolis	2	.250	.000	1.0	.5	1.0
