= Carl Shaeffer =

American basketball player

Personal information
- Born: October 25, 1924 Delphi, Indiana, U.S.
- Died: October 25, 1974 (aged 50) Delphi, Indiana, U.S.
- Listed height: 6 ft 3 in (1.91 m)
- Listed weight: 185 lb (84 kg)

Career information
- High school: Delphi (Delphi, Indiana)
- College: Alabama (1945–1949)
- NBA draft: 1949: undrafted
- Position: Small forward / shooting guard
- Number: 18

Career history
- 1949–1950: Indianapolis Olympians
- Stats at NBA.com
- Stats at Basketball Reference

Carl Edgel Shaeffer (October 25, 1924 – October 25, 1974) was an American professional basketball player. He played for the Indianapolis Olympians in the National Basketball Association (NBA) between 1949–50 and 1950–51 after a collegiate career with the Alabama Crimson Tide. Shaeffer was Alabama's first-ever professional basketball player. He became a businessman in Indianapolis, Indiana after his short-lived NBA career.

== Personal life ==
Shaeffer served in the United States Army during World War II and was taken prisoner of war by German forces in Belgium on January 18, 1945. Initially reported missing in action, he was later found to be a prisoner and was released at the end of the war. Following his basketball career, Shaeffer operated a tavern in Brookston, Indiana. He committed suicide by shooting himself on his 50th birthday in 1974.

== Career statistics ==
Legend
GP	Games played	GS	Games started	MPG	Minutes per game
FG%	Field goal percentage	3P%	3-point field goal percentage	FT%	Free throw percentage
RPG	Rebounds per game	APG	Assists per game	SPG	Steals per game
BPG	Blocks per game	PPG	Points per game	**Bold**	Career high

=== NBA ===
==== Regular season ====
Year	Team	GP	FG%	FT%	RPG	APG	PPG
1949–50	Indianapolis	**43**	**.369**	.561		**.9**	**3.5**
1950–51	Indianapolis	10	.273	**1.000**	1.0	.6	1.5
Career		53	.357	.583	1.0	.9	3.1

==== Playoffs ====
Year	Team	GP	FG%	FT%	APG	PPG
1949–50	Indianapolis	6	.333	.000	1.2	3.5
