= Marshall Hawkins (basketball) =

American basketball player (1924–2010)

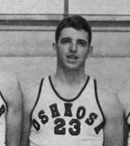
- Hawkins in 1948.

Personal information
- Born: August 3, 1924 Huntington, West Virginia, U.S.
- Died: October 8, 2010 (aged 86) Huntington, West Virginia, U.S.
- Listed height: 6 ft 3 in (1.91 m)
- Listed weight: 205 lb (93 kg)

Career information
- High school: Huntington (Huntington, West Virginia)
- College: Tennessee (1942–1943, 1945–1948)
- NBA draft: 1948: 3rd round, 27th overall pick
- Drafted by: Boston Celtics
- Position: Forward
- Number: 19

Career history
- 1948–1949: Oshkosh All-Stars
- 1949–1950: Indianapolis Olympians
- Stats at NBA.com
- Stats at Basketball Reference

James Marshall Hawkins (August 3, 1924 – October 28, 2010) was an American professional basketball player. Hawkins was selected in the 1948 BAA Draft by the Boston Celtics. He played for the Indianapolis Olympians in 1949–50, but prior to that he spent one season playing for the Oshkosh All-Stars in the National Basketball League.

== Career statistics ==
=== NBA ===
Legend
GP	Games played	GS	Games started	MPG	Minutes per game
FG%	Field goal percentage	3P%	3-point field goal percentage	FT%	Free throw percentage
RPG	Rebounds per game	APG	Assists per game	SPG	Steals per game
BPG	Blocks per game	PPG	Points per game	**Bold**	Career high

==== Regular season ====
Year	Team	GP	FG%	FT%	APG	PPG
1949–50	Indianapolis	39	.282	.689	1.3	3.9

==== Playoffs ====
Year	Team	GP	FG%	FT%	APG	PPG
1949–50	Indianapolis	2	.000	–	.0	.0
