= Bob Evans (basketball) =

American basketball player

Personal information
- Born: May 31, 1925 Indianapolis, Indiana
- Died: September 27, 1997 (aged 72) Southport, Indiana
- Listed height: 6 ft 2 in (1.88 m)
- Listed weight: 175 lb (79 kg)

Career information
- College: Butler (1946–1949)
- NBA draft: 1949: 4th round, –
- Drafted by: Indianapolis Jets
- Playing career: 1949–1950
- Position: Guard
- Number: 9

Career history
- 1949–1950: Indianapolis Olympians

Career NBA statistics
- Points: 142 (3.0 ppg)
- Assists: 55 (1.2 apg)
- Stats at NBA.com
- Stats at Basketball Reference

Robert W. Evans (May 31, 1925 – September 27, 1997) was an American professional basketball player. Evans was selected in the fourth round of the 1949 BAA Draft by the Indianapolis Jets after a collegiate career at Butler. He never played for the Jets, with the team folding prior to the merger of the BAA and the NBL, but played for one season with the Indianapolis Olympians in the National Basketball Association and averaged 3.0 points and 1.2 assists per game.

== Career statistics ==
Legend
GP	Games played	GS	Games started	MPG	Minutes per game
FG%	Field goal percentage	3P%	3-point field goal percentage	FT%	Free throw percentage
RPG	Rebounds per game	APG	Assists per game	SPG	Steals per game
BPG	Blocks per game	PPG	Points per game	**Bold**	Career high

=== NBA ===
==== Regular season ====
Year	Team	GP	FG%	FT%	APG	PPG
1949–50	Indianapolis	47	.280	.682	1.2	3.0

==== Playoffs ====
Year	Team	GP	FG%	FT%	APG	PPG
1949–50	Indianapolis	2	.250	–	.0	1.0
