= Leo Barnhorst =

American basketball player (1924–2000)

Personal information
- Born: May 11, 1924 Indianapolis, Indiana, U.S.
- Died: August 25, 2000 (aged 76)
- Listed height: 6 ft 4 in (1.93 m)
- Listed weight: 190 lb (86 kg)

Career information
- High school: Cathedral (Indianapolis, Indiana)
- College: Notre Dame (1946–1949)
- BAA draft: 1949: 2nd round
- Drafted by: Indianapolis Jets
- Playing career: 1949–1954
- Position: Small forward
- Number: 20, 8, 15

Career history
- 1949–1950: Chicago Stags
- 1950–1953: Indianapolis Olympians
- 1953–1954: Baltimore Bullets
- 1954: Fort Wayne Pistons

Career highlights
- 2× NBA All-Star (1952, 1953)

Career NBA statistics
- Points: 3,232 (9.4 ppg)
- Rebounds: 1,506 (5.4 rpg)
- Assists: 1,116 (3.2 apg)
- Stats at NBA.com
- Stats at Basketball Reference

Leo Alphonse "Barney" Barnhorst (May 11, 1924 – August 25, 2000) was an American basketball player.

A 6'4" forward/guard from Cathedral High School in Indianapolis, Barnhorst played four seasons at University of Notre Dame, where he was an honorable mention All-American. He then played professionally in the NBA for the Chicago Stags, Indianapolis Olympians, Baltimore Bullets and Fort Wayne Pistons. Barnhorst appeared in two NBA All-Star Games (1952, 1953) and scored 3,232 career points.

Barnhorst was inducted into the Indiana Basketball Hall of Fame in 1980.

== Career statistics ==
Legend
GP	Games played	GS	Games started	MPG	Minutes per game
FG%	Field goal percentage	3P%	3-point field goal percentage	FT%	Free throw percentage
RPG	Rebounds per game	APG	Assists per game	SPG	Steals per game
BPG	Blocks per game	PPG	Points per game	**Bold**	Career high

=== NBA ===
==== Regular season ====
Year	Team	GP	MPG	FG%	FT%	RPG	APG	PPG
1949–50	Chicago	67	–	.349	.698	–	2.1	6.5
1950–51	Indianapolis	68	–	.346	.689	4.4	3.2	8.0
1951–52	Indianapolis	66*	35.5	**.389**	.629	6.5	**3.9**	12.4
1952–53	Indianapolis	**71**	**40.4**	**.389**	.727	**6.8**	**3.9**	**13.6**
1953–54	Baltimore	55	34.2	.352	.707	4.7	3.9	7.9
1953–54	Fort Wayne	17	10.9	.211	**.833**	2.2	.7	1.7
Career		344	34.8	.368	.665	5.4	3.2	9.4
All-Star		2	18.0	.444	.000	2.5	1.5	8.0

==== Playoffs ====
Year	Team	GP	MPG	FG%	FT%	RPG	APG	PPG
1950	Chicago	2	–	.320	**1.000**	–	2.0	11.0
1951	Indianapolis	3	–	.371	.800	3.0	**4.0**	11.3
1952	Indianapolis	2	**42.5**	.412	.429	4.5	**4.0**	**15.5**
1953	Indianapolis	2	39.5	.364	.667	**11.0**	2.5	15.0
1954	Fort Wayne	**4**	15.0	**.526**	.600	1.3	1.5	5.8
Career		13	28.0	.390	.703	4.1	2.7	10.8
