= Paul Walther =

American basketball player

Personal information
- Born: March 23, 1927 Covington, Kentucky, U.S.
- Died: December 21, 2014 (aged 87) Atlanta, Georgia, U.S.
- Listed height: 6 ft 2 in (1.88 m)
- Listed weight: 160 lb (73 kg)

Career information
- High school: Covington Catholic (Park Hills, Kentucky)
- College: Tennessee (1944–1945, 1947–1949)
- NBA draft: 1949: – round, –
- Drafted by: Minneapolis Lakers
- Playing career: 1949–1955
- Position: Shooting guard / small forward
- Number: 14, 5

Career history
- 1949: Minneapolis Lakers
- 1949–1953: Indianapolis Olympians
- 1953–1954: Philadelphia Warriors
- 1954–1955: Fort Wayne Pistons

Career highlights
- NBA All-Star (1952); First-team All-SEC (1949)

Career NBA statistics
- Points: 2,838 (7.7 ppg)
- Rebounds: 1,168 (3.7 rpg)
- Assists: 974 (2.6 apg)
- Stats at NBA.com
- Stats at Basketball Reference

Paul Philip Walther (March 23, 1927 – December 21, 2014) was an American professional basketball player.

== Life ==
Walther was born in Covington, Kentucky, as the third of six children to George A. and Rosalie Walther. He was a graduate of Covington Catholic High School. He was a 6'2" guard/forward at the University of Tennessee, where he was coached by Emmett Lowery. His playing career was split by World War II, when he served in the United States Navy. Walther returned in 1947. He was team captain at Tennessee during 1948–49, his final season there.

Walther played six seasons (1949–1955) in the National Basketball Association as a member of the Minneapolis Lakers, Indianapolis Olympians, Philadelphia Warriors, and Fort Wayne Pistons. He averaged 7.7 points per game in his career and appeared in the 1952 NBA All-Star Game.

After his basketball career, Walther worked 32 years for Merrill Lynch in Chicago.

Walther died on December 21, 2014, in Atlanta at the age of 87.

== NBA career statistics ==
Legend
GP	Games played	GS	Games started	MPG	Minutes per game
FG%	Field goal percentage	3P%	3-point field goal percentage	FT%	Free throw percentage
RPG	Rebounds per game	APG	Assists per game	SPG	Steals per game
BPG	Blocks per game	PPG	Points per game	**Bold**	Career high

=== Regular season ===
Year	Team	GP	MPG	FG%	FT%	RPG	APG	PPG
1949–50	Minneapolis	22	–	.400	.524	–	.5	3.4
1949–50	Indianapolis	31	–	.390	.591	–	1.5	7.0
1950–51	Indianapolis	63	–	.336	.694	3.6	**3.6**	9.1
1951–52	Indianapolis	55	34.6	**.401**	**.750**	**4.5**	2.5	**12.2**
1952–53	Indianapolis	67	**36.8**	.352	.746	4.2	3.1	10.7
1953–54	Philadelphia	64	32.3	.352	.704	4.0	3.4	6.6
1954–55	Fort Wayne	**68**	12.1	.348	.614	2.3	1.9	2.4
	Career	370	28.6	.362	.708	3.7	2.6	7.7

=== Playoffs ===
Year	Team	GP	MPG	FG%	FT%	RPG	APG	PPG
1950	Indianapolis	6	–	.293	.474	–	1.3	5.5
1951	Indianapolis	3	–	.429	.733	1.7	**3.0**	5.7
1952	Indianapolis	2	42.5	.500	.889	3.5	**3.0**	**16.0**
1953	Indianapolis	2	37.5	.250	**.941**	**4.0**	2.0	13.0
1955	Fort Wayne	**10**	9.5	**.545**	.611	2.0	.8	3.5
	Career	23	18.2	.377	.724	2.4	1.5	6.2
