= 1946 National Invitation Tournament =

Annual NCAA basketball competition

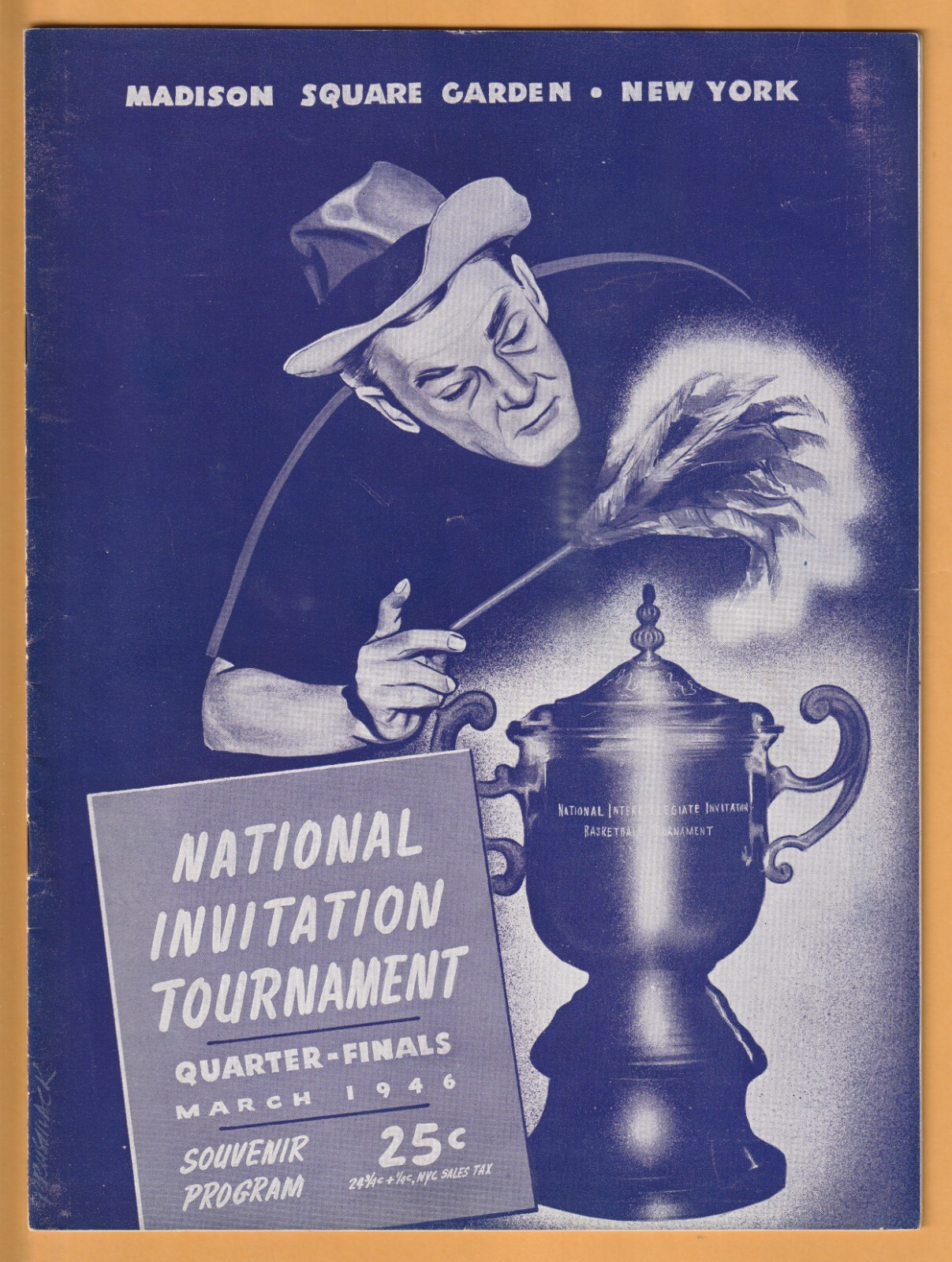

Tournament details
- City: New York City
- Venue: Madison Square Garden
- Teams: 8

Final positions
- Champions: Kentucky Wildcats (1st title)
- Runners-up: Rhode Island Rams
- Semifinalists: West Virginia Mountaineers; Muhlenberg Mules

Awards
- MVP: Ernie Calverley (Rhode Island)

The 1946 National Invitation Tournament was the 1946 edition of the annual NCAA college basketball competition.

== Selected teams ==
Below is a list of the eight teams selected for the tournament.

- Arizona
- Bowling Green
- Kentucky
- Muhlenberg
- Rhode Island
- St. John's
- Syracuse
- West Virginia

== Bracket ==
Below is the tournament bracket.

Quarterfinals
Rhode Island	82
Bowling Green	79
Muhlenberg	47
Syracuse	41
West Virginia	70
St. John's	58
Kentucky	77
Arizona	53

Semifinals
Rhode Island	59
Muhlenberg	49
West Virginia	51
Kentucky	59

Finals
Rhode Island	45
Kentucky	46

Third place game
Muhlenberg	40
West Virginia	65

== See also ==
- 1946 NCAA basketball tournament
- 1946 NAIA Division I men's basketball tournament
