= Alex Groza =

American basketball player (1926–1995)

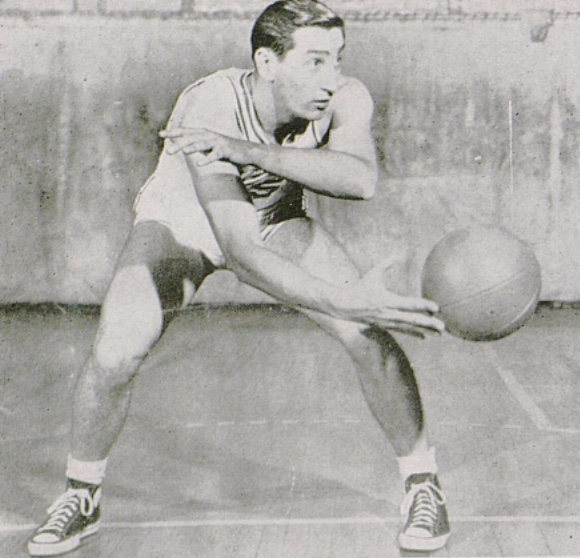

Personal information
- Born: October 7, 1926 Martins Ferry, Ohio, U.S.
- Died: January 21, 1995 (aged 68) San Diego, California, U.S.
- Listed height: 6 ft 7 in (2.01 m)
- Listed weight: 218 lb (99 kg)

Career information
- High school: Martins Ferry (Martins Ferry, Ohio)
- College: Kentucky (1945–1949)
- BAA draft: 1949: 1st round, 2nd overall pick
- Drafted by: Indianapolis Jets
- Playing career: 1949–1951
- Position: Center
- Number: 15

Career history

Playing
- 1949–1951: Indianapolis Olympians

Coaching
- 1959–1966: Bellarmine
- 1970: Kentucky Colonels
- 1974–1975: San Diego Conquistadors

Career highlights
- NBA All-Star (1951); 2× All-NBA First Team (1950, 1951); 2× NCAA champion (1948, 1949); 2× NCAA Final Four MOP (1948, 1949); 2× Consensus first-team All-American (1947, 1949); Consensus second-team All-American (1948); First-team All-SEC (1949)

Career NBA statistics
- Points: 2,925 (22.5 ppg)
- Rebounds: 709 (10.7 rpg)
- Assists: 318 (2.4 apg)
- Stats at NBA.com
- Stats at Basketball Reference
Medals
Men's basketball
Representing United States
Olympic Games
Gold medal – first place	1948 London	Team competition

Alex John Groza (October 7, 1926 – January 21, 1995) was an American professional basketball player from Martins Ferry, Ohio. As a result of the 1951 college basketball point-shaving scandal, Groza was banned from the National Basketball Association (NBA) for life. In college, he won two NCAA championships as captain of the University of Kentucky Wildcats, and was a two-time All-NBA player for the Indianapolis Olympians before his career abruptly ended.

== Early life ==
Groza grew up in Martins Ferry, Ohio and attended Martins Ferry High School. He was the brother of future Pro Football Hall-of-Famer Lou Groza.

Alex Groza led the Purple Riders to two undefeated regular seasons and to the Ohio state tournament both years, as Martins Ferry finished 24–1 in 1943 and 26–1 in 1944. In 1944, he scored 628 points, including 41 in one game, and was named first-team All-Ohio.

Groza was partway through the 1944–1945 season when he entered the United States Army for World War II in January 1945. Stationed at Fort Hood, Texas, he worked in a military hospital and played for the base's basketball team. He was discharged as a Technician Fourth Grade (TEC 4).

== College career ==
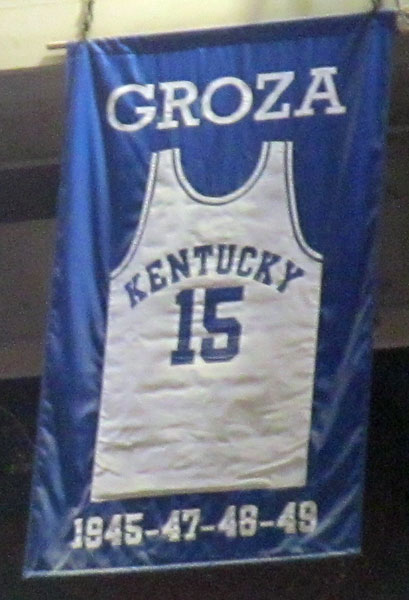
A jersey honoring Groza hangs in Rupp Arena.

Groza was the captain and center of the "Fabulous Five" that won the 1948 and 1949 NCAA Men's Basketball Championships, as well as the leading scorer on the gold medal-winning 1948 US Olympic basketball team. Groza was three-time All-American and All-SEC, and two-time NCAA Final Four Most Outstanding Player.

== Professional career ==
Groza was drafted in the 1st round of the 1949 BAA draft by the Indianapolis Jets. While he signed a contract to play for the Jets, he later changed his mind and signed with Indianapolis Olympians of the National Basketball League as a player and co-owner. With the merger of the BAA and the NBL to form the National Basketball Association in August the same year, Groza started his professional career in the new league where he averaged 23.4 points per game in his rookie season and was named NBA Rookie of the Year. Because the award was selected by newspaper writers at the time, the NBA currently does not recognize Groza having won the award. He averaged 22.5 points per game over two seasons before being implicated along with college teammates Ralph Beard and Dale Barnstable in a point shaving scandal during the 1948–49 season at Kentucky. NBA president Maurice Podoloff banned all of the implicated players from the league for life.

As a result of this ban, Groza became the first player in NBA history to end his career with a season in which he averaged at least 20 points per game (Groza averaged 21.7 PPG during the 1950–51). In NBA history, only three players have had higher scoring averages in their final NBA seasons: Bob Pettit (22.5 PPG in 1964–65), Paul Arizin (21.9 PPG in 1961–62), and Dražen Petrović (22.3 PPG in 1992–93).

Groza, along with Beard, attempted a comeback in late 1952 with the Jersey City Titans, formerly of the American Basketball League, but were barred by Judge Saul S. Streit from participating in any professional athletics while under probation.

== NBA career statistics ==
Legend
GP	Games played	GS	Games started	MPG	Minutes per game
FG%	Field goal percentage	3P%	3-point field goal percentage	FT%	Free throw percentage
RPG	Rebounds per game	APG	Assists per game	SPG	Steals per game
BPG	Blocks per game	PPG	Points per game	**Bold**	Career high
*	Led the league

=== Regular season ===
Year	Team	GP	FG%	FT%	RPG	APG	PPG
1949–50	Indianapolis	64	**.478***	.729	–	**2.5**	**23.4**
1950–51	Indianapolis	**66**	.470*	**.786**	**10.7**	2.4	21.7
Career		130	.474	.765	10.7	2.4	22.5
All-Star		1	.500	1.000	13.0	1.0	17.0

=== Playoffs ===
Year	Team	GP	FG%	FT%	RPG	APG	PPG
1950	Indianapolis	**6**	**.595**	**.831**	–	**2.0**	22.8
1951	Indianapolis	3	.493	.758	**14.0**	0.7	**32.3**
Career		9	.544	.804	14.0	1.6	26.0

== Coaching career ==
After his playing career ended, Groza became the coach of Bellarmine College (now University) in Louisville, Kentucky. In 1963, Groza led the Knights to a Kentucky Intercolliegiate Athletic Conference title and was named KIAC coach of the year. Groza left Bellarmine in 1966 for a brief coaching and managerial career in the American Basketball Association. Between 1971 and 1975, Groza coached 40 games with the Kentucky Colonels and San Diego Conquistadors and held a number of front office positions, including becoming the Kentucky Colonels' business manager in 1969 and general manager of the San Diego Conquistadors in 1972 (and, later, San Diego's head coach). Groza was 2–0 as coach of the Colonels but 15–23 as coach of the Conquistadors after replacing Wilt Chamberlain in 1974, putting his career coaching record at 17–23. He was named general manager of the expansion Conquistadors on August 8, 1972. In 1975 Groza became director of player development for the San Diego Sails of the ABA. After the Sails folded, he was named vice president and general manager of the San Diego Breakers of the International Volleyball Association on April 5, 1976.

== Personal life ==
After the team moved to Houston, Groza remained in San Diego, working as a sales manager for Reynolds International until his death.

Alex Groza died of cancer in 1995 at age 68. He was survived by his wife of 42 years, Jean (Watson) Groza, two sons, two daughters, and two grandchildren.

Groza's nickname during his playing career was "The Beak".

== Head coaching record ==
Legend
Regular season	G	Games coached	W	Games won	L	Games lost	W–L %	Win–loss %
Playoffs	PG	Playoff games	PW	Playoff wins	PL	Playoff losses	PW–L %	Playoff win–loss %

=== ABA ===
Team	Year	G	W	L	W–L%	Finish	PG	PW	PL	PW–L%	Result
Kentucky	1970–71	2	2	0	1.000	(interim)	—	—	—	—	—
San Diego	1974–75	38	15	23	.395	(reassigned)	—	—	—	—	—
**Career**		40	17	23	.425		—	—	—	—	

== See also ==
- List of people banned or suspended by the NBA
- San Diego Conquistadors

Preceded by Gene Rhodes	Kentucky Colonels Head Coach; 1970	Succeeded by Frank Ramsey
Preceded by Wilt Chamberlain	San Diego Conquistadors Head Coach; 1974–1975	Succeeded by Beryl Shipley
