= Ralph Beard =

American basketball player (1927–2007)

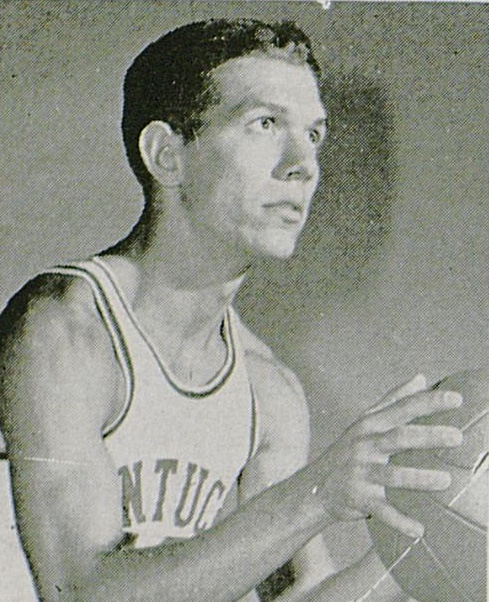

Personal information
- Born: December 2, 1927 Hardinsburg, Kentucky, U.S.
- Died: November 29, 2007 (aged 79) Louisville, Kentucky, U.S.
- Listed height: 5 ft 10 in (1.78 m)
- Listed weight: 175 lb (79 kg)

Career information
- High school: Louisville Male (Louisville, Kentucky)
- College: Kentucky (1945–1949)
- BAA draft: 1949: 2nd round, 22nd overall pick
- Drafted by: Chicago Stags
- Playing career: 1949–1951
- Position: Guard
- Number: 12

Career history
- 1949–1951: Indianapolis Olympians

Career highlights
- NBA All-Star (1951); All-NBA First-Team (1951); 2× NCAA champion (1948, 1949); 3× Consensus first-team All-American (1947–1949); First-team All-SEC (1949)

Career statistics
- Points: 2,006 (15.9 ppg)
- Rebounds: 251 (3.8 rpg)
- Assists: 551 (4.4 apg)
- Stats at NBA.com
- Stats at Basketball Reference
Medals
Men's basketball
Representing the United States
Gold medal – first place	1948 London	Team competition

Ralph Milton Beard Jr. (December 2, 1927 – November 29, 2007) was an American collegiate and professional basketball player. He won two NCAA national basketball championships at the University of Kentucky and played two years in the National Basketball Association prior to being barred for life for his participation in the 1951 college basketball point-shaving scandal.

== Early life ==
Beard was born in Hardinsburg, Kentucky. Beard grew up in Louisville and attended Louisville Male High School. He later cited the family's finances as a reason he took money from gamblers. His mother worked as a cleaning lady after his father left the family.

== College career ==
He was a member of Adolph Rupp's "Fabulous Five" University of Kentucky basketball team, with Alex Groza, Wallace Jones, Cliff Barker, and Kenny Rollins. Beard won a gold medal in the 1948 Summer Olympics with the Fabulous Five and the Phillips 66ers.

== Professional career ==
=== Indianapolis Olympians (1949–1951) ===
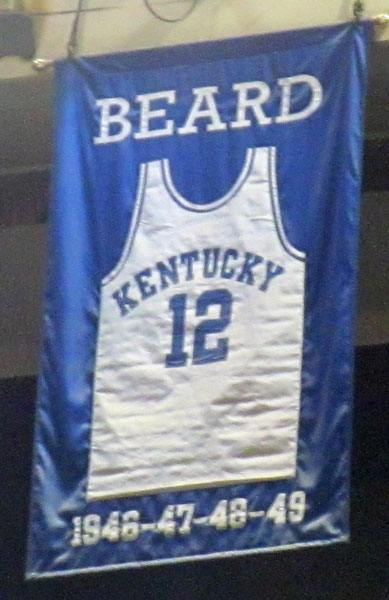
A jersey honoring Beard hangs in Rupp Arena.

Taken in the second round of the 1949 NBA draft, Beard played two seasons with the Indianapolis Olympians and averaged 15.9 points and 4.4 assists per game.

=== 1951 college basketball point-shaving scandal ===
In October 1951, authorities charged him along with his former teammates Alex Groza and Dale Barnstable with taking bribes as part of the 1951 college basketball point-shaving scandal. They pleaded guilty and received suspended sentences but the NBA Commissioner Maurice Podoloff banned all three for life from the NBA. Beard admitted that he took $700 but denied that he had ever shaved points in a game. He claimed that Frank Hogan, the New York district attorney, conspired with Podoloff of the NBA and Cardinal Francis Spellman, the Archbishop of New York to go after Midwestern players in an effort to protect players at Catholic colleges.

==== Aftermath ====
He worked in the pharmaceutical industry afterward. His only involvement in the sport after his ban was some scouting work with the Kentucky Colonels of the American Basketball Association. He tried playing professional baseball but his ban for gambling prevented him from that sport as well.

== NBA career statistics ==
Legend
GP	Games played	GS	Games started	MPG	Minutes per game
FG%	Field goal percentage	3P%	3-point field goal percentage	FT%	Free throw percentage
RPG	Rebounds per game	APG	Assists per game	SPG	Steals per game
BPG	Blocks per game	PPG	Points per game	**Bold**	Career high

=== Regular season ===
Year	Team	GP	MPG	FG%	FT%	RPG	APG	PPG
1949–50	Indianapolis	60	–	.363	.762	–	3.9	14.9
1950–51	Indianapolis	**66**	–	**.368**	**.775**	**3.8**	**4.8**	**16.8**
Career		126	–	.366	.770	3.8	4.4	15.9
All-Star		1	–	.375	.000	3.0	2.0	6.0

=== Playoffs ===
Year	Team	GP	MPG	FG%	FT%	RPG	APG	PPG
1950	Indianapolis	**5**	–	.314	**.786**	–	**4.4**	13.2
1951	Indianapolis	3	–	**.443**	.706	**4.0**	4.3	**22.0**
Career		8	–	.374	.756	4.0	4.4	16.5

== Personal life ==
Later in life, the University of Kentucky welcomed Beard back. The school retired his jersey in 1995 and invited him to speak to players about point shaving.

In 1985, he was inducted into the Kentucky Athletic Hall of Fame.

Beard died on November 29, 2007, at his Louisville, Kentucky home.

== See also ==
- List of people banned or suspended by the NBA
