= Wallace Jones =

American basketball player (1926–2014)

Personal information
- Born: July 14, 1926 Harlan, Kentucky, U.S.
- Died: July 27, 2014 (aged 88) Lexington, Kentucky, U.S.
- Listed height: 6 ft 4 in (1.93 m)
- Listed weight: 225 lb (102 kg)

Career information
- High school: Harlan (Harlan, Kentucky)
- College: Kentucky (1945–1949)
- BAA draft: 1949: 1st round, 8th overall pick
- Drafted by: Washington Capitols
- Playing career: 1949–1952
- Position: Power forward
- Number: 17

Career history
- 1949–1952: Indianapolis Olympians

Career highlights
- 2× NCAA champion (1948, 1949); Consensus second-team All-American (1949); First-team All-SEC (1949)

Career NBA statistics
- Points: 1,428 (10.2 ppg)
- Rebounds: 408 (5.1 rpg)
- Assists: 429 (3.1 apg)
- Stats at NBA.com
- Stats at Basketball Reference
Medals
Men's basketball
Representing the United States
Olympic Games
Gold medal – first place	1948 London	Team competition

Wallace Clayton "Wah Wah" Jones (July 14, 1926 – July 27, 2014) was an American professional basketball player. He played in the National Basketball Association (NBA) from 1949 to 1952 with the Indianapolis Olympians.

== Biography ==
Jones was born in Harlan, Kentucky. He attended Harlan High School, where he set a national scoring record in basketball and led his school to a state championship. He was all-state in football, basketball and baseball.

Jones attended the University of Kentucky, where he continued to play varsity football, basketball and baseball. He was twice All-SEC in football. In basketball, he was a three time All-American and four time All-SEC. He led the Wildcats to two NCAA Championships, in 1948 and 1949. Jones was a member of the 1948 Olympic Gold medal-winning team with Adolph Rupp's "Fabulous Five" and the Phillips 66ers. During his four years at Kentucky, the basketball team had a combined record of 130–10 and won the SEC championship every year.

He holds the unique distinction of being an All-American under both legends, Adolph Rupp (basketball) and Bear Bryant (football) when both coached at Kentucky. He is the only player to have his number retired in both football and basketball at Kentucky. At the University of Kentucky, Jones was a member of the Phi Delta Theta fraternity. Jones was selected in the seventh round of the 1949 NFL draft by the Chicago Bears, but did not play in the league.

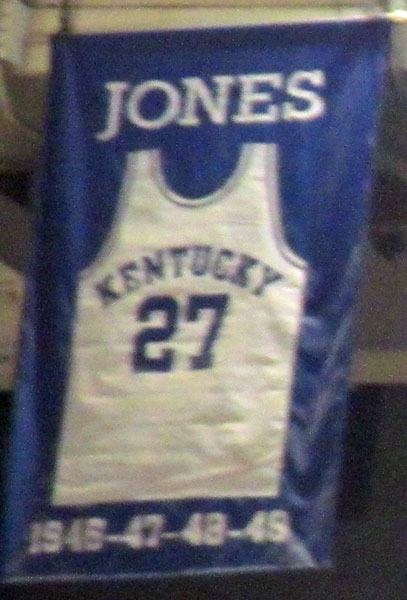
A jersey honoring Jones hangs in Rupp Arena.

In 1953, Jones was elected the sheriff of Fayette County, Kentucky. In 1956, Jones was the Republican nominee for Kentucky's 6th congressional district seat in the United States House of Representatives. Though Dwight Eisenhower, heading the Republican ticket, carried the state, Jones lost the election to Democrat John C. Watts.

In 1978, Jones started a charter bus company called "Blue Grass Tours" that is contracted to the UK Athletics department. Blue Grass Tours is currently run by his son Wallace (Wah) Jones and grandson Corey Jones, and manages a fleet of coach busses for the use of the athletic teams.

=== "Wah Wah" ===
Known as Wallace in his early years, Jones acquired the nickname, "Wah Wah", when his younger sister Jackie, just learning to talk, could not pronounce his name.

=== Death ===
Jones died in Lexington on July 27, 2014, at the age of 88.

== Career statistics ==
Legend
GP	Games played	GS	Games started	MPG	Minutes per game
FG%	Field goal percentage	3P%	3-point field goal percentage	FT%	Free throw percentage
RPG	Rebounds per game	APG	Assists per game	SPG	Steals per game
BPG	Blocks per game	PPG	Points per game	**Bold**	Career high

=== NBA ===
==== Regular season ====
Year	Team	GP	MPG	FG%	FT%	RPG	APG	PPG
1949–50	Indianapolis	**60**	–	.374	.751	–	3.2	**12.5**
1950–51	Indianapolis	22	–	**.392**	**.792**	**5.7**	**3.9**	11.2
1951–52	Indianapolis	58	22.8	.313	.750	4.9	2.6	7.4
Career		140	22.8	.355	.757	5.1	3.1	10.2

==== Playoffs ====
Year	Team	GP	MPG	FG%	FT%	RPG	APG	PPG
1950	Indianapolis	**5**		.301	**.853**		**4.4**	**14.6**
1952	Indianapolis	1	8.0	**.333**	–	.0	.0	2.0
Career		6	8.0	.303	.853	.0	3.7	12.5

== Head coaching record ==
Team	Year	G	W	L	W–L%	Finish	PG	PW	PL	PW–L%	Result
Indianapolis	1950–51	12	7	5	.583	4th in Western	3	1	2	.333	Lost in division semifinals
Career		12	7	5	.583		3	1	2	.333	
