= Cliff Barker =

American basketball player (1921–1998)

Personal information
- Born: January 15, 1921 Yorktown, Indiana, U.S.
- Died: March 17, 1998 (aged 77) Satsuma, Florida, U.S.
- Listed height: 6 ft 2 in (1.88 m)
- Listed weight: 185 lb (84 kg)

Career information
- High school: Yorktown (Yorktown, Indiana)
- College: Kentucky (1946–1949)
- NBA draft: 1949: 5th round, 52nd overall pick
- Drafted by: Washington Capitols
- Playing career: 1949–1952
- Position: Guard
- Number: 10

Career history
- 1949–1952: Indianapolis Olympians

Career highlights
- 2× NCAA champion (1948, 1949); Second-team All-SEC (1949)

Career statistics
- Points: 557
- Rebounds: 181
- Assists: 294
- Stats at NBA.com
- Stats at Basketball Reference
Medals
Men's basketball
Representing the United States
Olympic Games
Gold medal – first place	1948 London	Team competition

Clifford Eugene Barker (January 15, 1921 – March 17, 1998) was an American basketball player who won the gold medal with the USA national basketball team at the 1948 Summer Olympics in London and two national championships at the University of Kentucky.

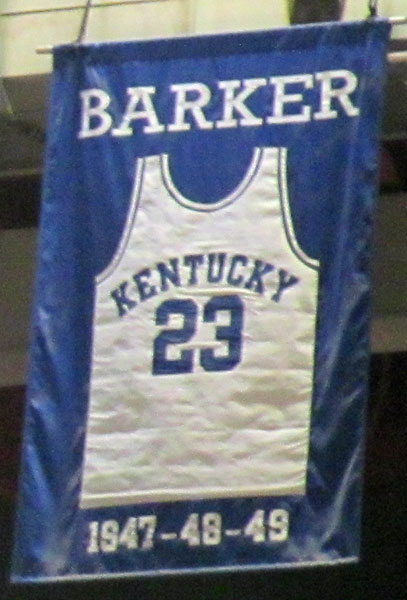
A jersey honoring Barker hangs in Rupp Arena.

While at the University of Kentucky, Barker was an All-SEC (Second Team) and All-SEC Tournament guard during the 1947–48 and 1948–49 seasons.

A member of the United States Army Air Forces during World War II, Barker was a B-17 Flying Fortress waist gunner and spent 16 months as a prisoner-of-war. "Fancy Nancy III," the B-17 he was assigned to was shot down in the vicinity of Konigslutter. "Fancy Nancy III" was assigned to the 612 Bombardment Squadron, a unit of the 401st Bombardment Group.

== Career statistics ==
Legend
GP	Games played	GS	Games started	MPG	Minutes per game
FG%	Field goal percentage	3P%	3-point field goal percentage	FT%	Free throw percentage
RPG	Rebounds per game	APG	Assists per game	SPG	Steals per game
BPG	Blocks per game	PPG	Points per game	**Bold**	Career high

=== NBA ===
==== Regular season ====
Year	Team	GP	MPG	FG%	FT%	RPG	APG	PPG
1949–50	Indianapolis	49		**.372**	**.708**		**2.2**	**5.7**
1950–51	Indianapolis	**56**		.252	.649	**1.8**	2.1	2.7
1951–52	Indianapolis	44	**11.2**	.298	.588	1.8	1.6	2.9
Career		149	11.2	.316	.662	1.8	2.0	3.7

==== Playoffs ====
Year	Team	GP	FG%	FT%	RPG	APG	PPG
1949–50	Indianapolis	**6**	**.387**	**.667**		2.2	**5.7**
1950–51	Indianapolis	3	.211	.000	**5.0**	**3.3**	2.7
Career		9	.320	.556	5.0	2.6	4.7

== Head coaching record ==
=== NBA ===
Legend
Regular season	G	Games coached	W	Games won	L	Games lost	W–L %	Win–loss %
Playoffs	PG	Playoff games	PW	Playoff wins	PL	Playoff losses	PW–L %	Playoff win–loss %

Team	Year	G	W	L	W–L%	Finish	PG	PW	PL	PW–L%	Result
Indianapolis	1949–50	64	39	25	.609	1st in Western	6	3	3	.500	Lost in Division finals
Indianapolis	1950–51	56	24	32	.429	(resigned)	—	—	—	—	Missed Playoffs
Career		120	63	57	.525		6	3	3	.500	

== See also ==
- Fabulous Five (Kentucky Wildcats)
