= Indianapolis Olympians =

Basketball team

- Division: Western
- Founded: 1949
- Folded: 1953
- History: Indianapolis Olympians; 1949–1953
- Arena: Butler Fieldhouse
- Location: Indianapolis, Indiana
- Team colors: Blue, white, red
- Division titles: 1 (1950)

The Indianapolis Olympians were a founding National Basketball Association (NBA) team based in Indianapolis. They were founded in 1949 and folded in 1953. Their home arena was Butler Fieldhouse on the campus of Butler University, now known as Hinkle Fieldhouse.

== Franchise history ==
The Olympians were founded in 1949 and were originally slated to play in the National Basketball League (NBL). However, with the merger of the NBL and the Basketball Association of America, the franchise played its first games in the newly formed National Basketball Association (NBA), essentially replacing the previously existing Indianapolis Jets franchise. The Olympians were led by University of Kentucky alumni Alex Groza and Ralph Beard, both of whom were key contributors on the gold medal-winning 1948 US Olympic basketball team. Olympic team members Wallace Jones and Cliff Barker (both also Kentucky alumni) also played on the team. An Olympic alternate and UK grad, Joe Holland, played forward for the Indianapolis team through the 1952 season.

After the 1951 season, Groza and Beard were suspended from the NBA for life by commissioner Maurice Podoloff when the players admitted point shaving during their college careers. The Olympians finished with a 28–43 record in 1953, and folded after that season on April 23, 1953. The Olympians compiled a 132–137 record in four seasons in the NBA.

Indianapolis would not have an NBA team until 1976 when the Indiana Pacers were one of the four teams admitted from the American Basketball Association in the ABA–NBA merger.

The Olympians still hold the distinction of being the winning team in the longest game in NBA history—they were the 75–73 victors in a six-overtime game against the Rochester Royals in a game played on January 6, 1951.

== Seasons ==
NBA champions ‡	Division champions ^	Playoff berth #

Season	Division	Finish (Note: The Finish column lists regular season results and excludes postseason play.)	W (Note: The Wins and Losses columns list regular season results and exclude any postseason play. Regular and postseason records are combined only below the table.)	L	Win%	GB	Playoffs	Awards	Head coach
1949–50	Western ^	1st ^	39	25	.609	—	Won Division semifinals (Red Skins) 2–1; Lost Division finals (Packers) 1–2		Cliff Barker
1950–51	Western	4th #	31	37	.456	13	Lost Division semifinals (Lakers) 1–2		Cliff Barker; Wally Jones
1951–52	Western	3rd #	34	32	.515	7	Lost Division semifinals (Lakers) 0–2		Herm Schaefer
1952–53	Western	4th #	28	43	.394	20.5	Lost Division semifinals (Lakers) 0–2		Herm Schaefer

== Notable players ==
=== Basketball Hall of Famers ===
None

=== Others ===
- Ralph Beard
- Alex Groza
- Wallace Jones
- Paul Walther
- Kleggie Hermsen
