= 1951 college basketball point-shaving scandal =

College basketball gambling scandal

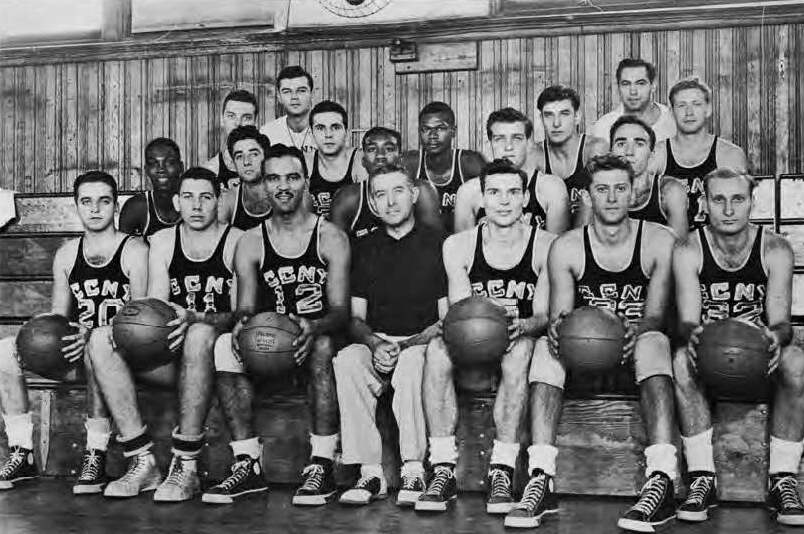
The 1949–50 CCNY Beavers men's basketball team, led by coach Nat Holman, are the team most associated with the point-shaving scandal, having won both the 1950 NCAA tournament and the 1950 National Invitation Tournament. Several players from that team (as shown here) would later be implicated in the scandal in 1951.

In 1951, allegations of point-shaving and match fixing in college basketball revealed widespread bribery and corruption involving major colleges and universities in and around New York City, particularly at Madison Square Garden. While the public scandal officially involved at least seven American colleges and universities (with one university having a player retroactively participating in the event during this time after initially being missed during the original investigation period), the scandal has been most closely associated with the 1949–50 CCNY Beavers, which won both the 1950 NCAA basketball tournament and 1950 National Invitation Tournament and had a number of players implicated in point shaving and match fixing.

The initial scandal centered on New York City area colleges and universities: CCNY, Manhattan College, New York University and Long Island University, before spreading farther out west to the University of Toledo, Bradley University, and 1951 NCAA champion University of Kentucky. Players in California (specifically in Southern California and San Francisco), Oregon, Colorado, Georgetown, and the Ivy League also met up with gamblers, though only one player from those areas would ultimately accept any of their offers. CCNY was eventually banned from playing at Madison Square Garden, although both head coach Nat Holman and assistant coach Bobby Sand were cleared of any wrongdoing themselves. Manhattan District Attorney Frank Hogan led the prosecution of dozens of gamblers and players for attempted bribery and match fixing, including thirty-five players (some of whom had played professionally, including at the NBA), a disgraced NBA referee, and multiple members of organized crime. Previous investigations related to the scandal also revealed widespread bribery of police and corruption within the New York City Police Department, which led to the resignations of Mayor William O'Dwyer and Police Commissioner William O'Brien alongside multiple other police officers who accepted bribes.

The scandal itself compromised the integrity of college basketball and threatened its very existence at the time.

== Background ==
=== Early match fixing attempts ===
The earliest reported attempt at fixing a college basketball match occurred on January 21, 1927, when Wabash College athletic director Harry Scholler reported that a professional gambler attempted to bribe their star player, Benjamin "Benny" Devol, before their game against Franklin College of Indianapolis. However, Devol rejected the offer and finished the game with more points than the entire Franklin College team in Wabash College's 47–32 win. Another early attempt occurred in early March 1931, when the Brooklyn Eagle reported St. John's University star Max Posnack was offered $3,000 (equivalent to $51,047 in 2025 and more than twice the average annual income for a U.S. worker at the time) to rig a game against Manhattan College at Madison Square Garden. No further match fixing attempts were reported in college basketball until the 1940s, partially because any players seeking to fix games would rarely memorialize their gambling activities and partially because illegal activity was intentionally ignored in hopes that the sport's gambling problem would disappear on its own accord.

By 1944, illegal bookmakers were common in the United States. Many started out as bootleggers and expanded into gambling and prostitution rings following the end of Prohibition and the start of the Great Depression. Bookmakers often cooperated with law enforcement to report attempted bribery in order to develop a reputation for honesty dealing with bettors, seek political protection, and avoid losing a rigged bet. Despite these efforts, gambling and match fixing became more widespread and serious within college basketball. In January 1945, Arthur Daley of The New York Times heard rumors of college basketball games being thrown for around 15 years, with him even recalling certain games that had the final results being questioned at the time.

On the day before the 1944 NCAA championship, a gambler reportedly approached University of Utah head coach Vadal Peterson and asked how much would it take for Utah to lose to Dartmouth College. Peterson responded with a quick right punch to the gambler in question. Utah would later win the championship game in overtime that year. In October 1944, University of Kansas coach Phog Allen warned of a major gambling incident "that would stink to high heaven", citing an earlier incident where two Philadelphia Textile Institute players agreed to rig a game for $1,000 (equivalent to $14,508 in 2025), though they ultimately did not follow through with the event.

Following the conclusion of World War II, football became the biggest sport for colleges and universities, but basketball became a popular alternative revenue stream, particularly for schools, given its more modest operating costs and potentially greater return on expenses, especially considering the potential for one great recruit to carry his team to success and celebrity status. Newspapers and magazines began covering the sport in syndicated columns, with writers depending on coaches and athletic administrations to provide stories. This media environment rarely led to stories being critical of college programs, including moments that felt like fixing was going on within the games at hand, with the rare stories in question that were critical noting a select few teams like the Long Island Blackbirds that felt like they were routinely working with gamblers or that they had betting suspended on them due to "unusual money" coming in too often on the Long Island team in particular. Regardless, following the 1945 Brooklyn College scandal, things with college basketball and gambling were considered relatively calm up until 1948.

=== 1945 Brooklyn College scandal and Wilson-Moritt Act ===
Prior to the CCNY scandal, the most infamous case of match fixing in college basketball occurred on January 29, 1945, when five Brooklyn College players (Bernard Barnett, Jerome Green, Robert Leder, Larry Pearlstein, and Stanley Simon) were arrested and confessed to accepting $1,000 each from multiple gamblers with promises of an extra $2,000 (equivalent to over $34,900 in 2024) included to throw their scheduled game against the Municipal University of Akron at the Boston Garden alongside a later game against St. Francis College at Madison Square Garden. Interestingly enough, one other individual that would mistakenly be named as an involved individual in this Brooklyn College scandal in at least one major resource, David Budin, would later be involved in a different NCAA gambling scandal many years later through the 1961 NCAA University Division men's basketball gambling scandal. Regardless of the actual individuals involved, though, the revelation of the scandal at hand would lead to Akron and Brooklyn cancelling their planned match that was presumed to be held for later that day altogether.

The "Brooklyn Five" scandal came to light when two detectives noticed Barnett and Pearlstein entering the home of Henry Rosen, a suspected fence for teenage garment thieves. On following the two players, the detectives saw them enter to gambler Harvey Stemmer's house, leading to the players' arrest and expulsion from the college. One of the five players involved questioned why the Brooklyn players were expelled, especially since he claimed that every college in the city was fixing games. Both Rosen and Stemmer would later be indicted for their involvement alongside a third individual referred to only as "Danny"; while in prison, Stemmer was found to be involved in bribing two New York Giants players (quarterback Frank Filchock and running back Merle Hapes) ahead of the 1946 NFL Championship Game. The two Giants players in question would later be given lifetime bans from the NFL following that event, though their lifetime bans would later be repealed in the early 1950s.

During the scandal, mayor Fiorello La Guardia revealed that Pearlstein had not attended Brooklyn College directly while he was playing for the team. In response, Manhattan assemblyman William J. A. Glancy raised the possibility that "dummy students", who joined teams despite not meeting admission and scholastic requirements, could be planted by gamblers. Jack Laub of CCNY was raised as one of those students in question. The Brooklyn Five scandal led the New York State Legislature to pass the 1945 Wilson-Moritt Bill on April 9, which made it a felony to extend or accept a bribe to throw a game in a wide number of amateur sports, including basketball.

The NCAA addressed concerns following the 1945 scandal by creating the Principles for the Conduct of Intercollegiate Athletics, known colloquially as the "Sanity Code". The "Sanity Code" was made in an early attempt to help get rid of any early point-shaving or other gambling-related problems with the NCAA, especially in the college basketball scene, but it would ultimately prove to be a failure in the end. By the end of the 1940s, according to author Stanley Cohen, even children and casual spectators began to suspect corruption was rampant in college basketball.

== Origins ==
During the 1944–45 season, City College of New York player Lenny Hassman, who was reported to be a "dumper", attempted to bribe star player Paul Schmones, but Schmones reported the offer to head coach Nat Holman, who immediately removed Hassman from the team and reported the attempt to Frank S. Lloyd, the university's hygiene chairman. However, neither Holman nor Lloyd took further action on this situation or made the incident public following Hassman's removal from the team. During the same season, CCNY player William Levine was approached by gamblers before a game against the University of Syracuse, but Levine declined their offers to rig games. On January 14, 1948, Leonard Cohen of the New York Post reported another attempt to fix a game between CCNY and the University of Syracuse at the Madison Square Garden, but the bettors favoring Syracuse lost $50,000 (equivalent to $651,815 in 2024) that night. CCNY athletic director Sam Winograd admitted that he had received a telegram warning him of the fix, but had not commented to the press on it.

At a sportswriters' meeting in 1948, Holman claimed another scandal similar to the Brooklyn Five would break out during the season. Holman's claim was suggested to have occurred before the January 14, 1948 game against Syracuse took place. Later in the year, Maude Stewart, the director of information services for the New York Board of Education, wrote to CCNY president Harry N. Wright regarding gambling influences at Madison Square Garden. Wright considered Stewart's suggestions unacceptable, given the results of the 1945 Brooklyn College scandal.

The apex of the cheating occurred on a double-header night at the Madison Square Garden on December 28, 1950. Salvatore T. Sollazzo, a jeweler-turned-gambler, attempted to fix games by both CCNY and Long Island against the underdogs at the University of Arizona and Western Kentucky University, respectively. CCNY, who were favored by six points, attempted to win by less than that, but ultimately lost to Arizona by a meager 41–38 final. Meanwhile, Long Island actually double-crossed Sollazzo by winning their match over Western Kentucky by only 7 points, with Western Kentucky scoring 13 unanswered points in the final two minutes of the game. Spectators left both games furious, with some of them claiming the games felt like "slot machines on wheels".

== Investigations and arrests ==
Although match fixing was not limited to New York City, the 1951 scandal primarily surrounded the activities of several New York City colleges and universities. Arrests and indictments made by Manhattan District Attorney Frank Hogan primarily focused on New York City before implicating players from other schools who had fixed games in New York City.

=== Manhattan district attorney ===
On January 4, 1949, Manhattan District Attorney Frank Hogan arrested four men (Joseph Aronowitz, Phillip Klein, Jack Levy, and William Rivlin) for attempting to bribe David Shapiro, co-captain for George Washington University, to fix a game against Manhattan College at the Madison Square Garden. One of the four men approached Shapiro the previous summer, but Shapiro insisted on an advance payment if he wanted to go through with the bribe, which led to the conspirators trying to bribe his uncle on game night. Max Rumack, a member of Hogan's staff, posed as the uncle for that event. What figured to be an isolated incident at the time would later be seen as a precursor of what was to come in 1951.

=== New York Journal-American ===
The first newspaper to seriously investigate the scandal was the New York Journal-American, led by sports editor Max Kase. After hearing rumors of widespread corruption in the late 1940s, Kase assigned a crime reporter to obtain evidence of match fixing during the 1948–49 season. Kase later presented the Journal-American's evidence to Frank Hogan on January 10, 1951. Hogan asked Kase to delay the story, in order to wiretap and surveil individuals related to the case. Kase's own story eventually being released would help shed light on not just the scandal coming to light, but also on having other college players report on gamblers trying to bribe them in games played, such as with University of Southern California player Ken Flower reporting to head coach Forrest Twogood that a gambler offered him $1,500 (equivalent to $18,125 in 2024) to throw a game against UCLA; former University of San Francisco All-American Don Lofgran revealing he had multiple calls from Portland, Oregon inquiring if he and his teammate Frank Kuzara were interested in "doing business" with them and that threats of violence could have happened to them if they reported the calls to head coach Pete Newell; University of Oregon head coach John A. Warren revealing a gambler came into his team's dressing room in Kansas City, Missouri during the 1945 NCAA basketball tournament to offer star player Dick Wilkins $500 to lose their game against the University of Arkansas (which Oregon did lose on that night); University of Colorado head coach Frosty Cox reporting to Ned Irish that Lee Robbins had gamblers try to proposition him, but he denied them and reported them to Cox (though Irish claimed not to remember the conversation); and Barry F. Sullivan from the University of Georgetown would also see gamblers try to proposition him, with Sullivan denying them all as well. Kase later earned a Pulitzer Prize in 1952 for his investigative stories into the scandal.

=== New York City Police Department cover-up ===
Parallel to the January 1951 case that led to the arrests of multiple college players, a report released by the Brooklyn Eagle in February 1951 revealed that the New York City Police Department suppressed around forty recordings of telephone conversations before, during, and after the 1949–50 season that detailed accounts of a substantial fix involving players from every major college in and around New York City. Further investigations revealed that bookie Harry Gross and his brother Frank Gross had engaged in widespread manipulation and bribery of city police. The Gross scandal eventually resulted in the resignation of Mayor William O'Dwyer, police commissioner William O'Brien, and various other officers who accepted bribes, as well as led to numerous police reforms along the way.

==== Manhattan College arrests ====
In January 1951, Junius Kellogg, a standout Manhattan College center, was offered a $1,000 bribe (equivalent to $12,800 in 2024) to shave points against DePaul on January 16. Although he was working for minimum wage at a frozen custard shop near campus, Kellogg reported the offer to his Manhattan coach Ken Norton, who referred Kellogg to Hogan. To obtain evidence, Kellogg wore a wire when he was approached again in a nearby bar by Henry "Hank" Poppe, who explained the point-shaving scheme in great detail and claimed professional players were involved as well. After the DePaul game, Poppe and co-captain John Byrnes were arrested alongside fixers Cornelius Kelleher and brothers Benjamin and Irving Schwartzberg. Kelleher had paid the two players $40 per week (equivalent to $528.03 in 2024) before the 1949–50 season, as well as $3,000 per game to ensure Manhattan lost against Siena, Santa Clara, and Bradley and $2,000 per game (equivalent to over $26,400 in 2024) to beat the spread against St. Francis and NYU. Following their arrest, Poppe and Byrnes asked why they were being targeted when others were involved in match fixing.

==== CCNY, NYU, and LIU arrests ====
On February 17, 1951, after a victory over Temple in Philadelphia, the CCNY team were stopped in Camden, New Jersey by two undercover detectives from Hogan's office. The detectives arrested three players who had been instrumental to the 1950 championship team: center Ed Roman, guard Alvin Roth, and All-American forward Ed Warner. All three men were charged with conspiring to fix games, along with jeweler-turned-gambler Salvatore Sollazzo, Harvey Schaff of New York University, and former Long Island player Eddie Gard, who by then worked as an agent for Sollazzo. While under arrest, the CCNY players confessed to shaving points against inferior teams in exchange for $1,500 per player per game (equivalent to over $19,550 in 2024). Roman, Roth, and Warner were indicted for accepting bribes, while Gard was indicted for bribery and Schaff was indicted for attempting to bribe a teammate of his named Jim Brasco. Sollazzo and Gard were indicted for paying a total of $30,000 in bribes (equivalent to over $396,000 in 2024) to players over the prior two seasons.

==== Sol Levy ====
Sol Levy, an NBA referee who was in his early 40s at the time, was suspended and later arrested for arranging the outcome for fixing (or at least attempting to fix) six different NBA games in 1950. Notably, he succeeded in fixing games on November 11 between the Boston Celtics and Washington Capitols, November 12 between the Celtics and Indianapolis Olympians (which was the game that notably caught him in the act), and November 19 between the New York Knicks and Syracuse Nationals, but failed in fixing games on November 4 between the Minneapolis Lakers and Washington Capitols, November 15 between the Baltimore Bullets and Philadelphia Warriors, and November 18 between the Knicks and Warriors. However, Levy would also admit to associating with Salvatore Sollazzo and Eddie Gard, one of the implicated players from Long Island who also became a fixer himself, during this period of time. With Levy later receiving $1,000 from the duo (Sollazzo in particular), Levy would end up becoming an accomplice of them during this period of time as well. Levy's arrest later led to a modification to the Wilson-Morritt Act of 1945 to include a provision for referees. After Levy was freed up from his prison sentence he was initially given, Levy was later found murdered for not upholding his part in rigging at least three more games in the NBA.

==== Continued CCNY and LIU arrests ====
On February 20, three Long Island players admitted to their own complicity in the growing scandal. The three players had accepted a total of $18,500 (equivalent to over $244,210 in 2024) for eight games in the two most recent seasons, including their NIT opening round loss against Syracuse, and were arrested themselves. Alongside Adolph Bigos and Leroy Smith, the most notable arrest of the trio of player was that of Sherman White, who had been named the Sporting News Player of the Year the day prior. White's arrest prematurely ended his college career with him being only 77 points short of the all-time college scoring record at the time, as well as ended his chances of playing in the NBA; the New York Knicks had planned on drafting him with a territorial pick in the 1951 NBA draft.

A week after the Long Island arrests, Nat Miller of LIU and Floyd Layne of CCNY were also arrested. Layne admitted to accepting $3,000 (equivalent to over $39,100 in 2024) for rigged games during the most recent season. On information given out by Eddie Gard, Miller was charged for rigging two games for $1,500 (equivalent to $19,800 in 2024). Layne's arrest came after he scored 19 points for CCNY in a 67–48 win over Lafayette College and a game against Cincinnati was canceled. On March 26, three more players from the CCNY championship team were arrested: Herb Cohen, Irwin Dambrot (then a dental student at Columbia University), and Norm Mager (then a rookie season for the original Baltimore Bullets franchise of the NBA). Mager later became the first player to be permanently banned from the NBA. On March 30, former LIU player Louis Lipman was arrested for fixing a game against Duquesne University on January 1, 1949. On April 13, LIU player Richard Fuertado was arrested for admitting to fixing four games in the prior two seasons. On April 28, gambler Eli "Kaye" Klukofsky was arrested for his own involvement in fixing some of the CCNY games.

===== University of Toledo arrests =====
On July 20, four players from the University of Toledo (Jack Feeman, Bob McDonald, Carlos Muzi, and Bill Walker) were arrested on charges of point-shaving in New York City and the surrounding area. Local bookmakers tipped Hogan off that gamblers frequently attended Toledo's home games and that some Toledo players were involved with both betting on and fixing a December 14, 1950 game against Niagara University. While local law enforcement had previously raided Toledo gambling establishments with the university's support, there had been little permanent effects involved. Instead, surveillance on Jacob Rubinstein, a Brooklyn bookie and friend of Toledo freshman Joe Massa, led the New York investigators to Toledo. Massa had previously trained with Bill Walker and introduced him to Eli "Kaye" Klukofsky, who offered Walker $250 (equivalent to nearly $3,260 in 2024) to fix games and an additional $250 for every player he recruited to join in. Rubinstein and three of the four players implicated Massa. Feeman's participation was revealed later on by an intercollegiate investigatory committee headed by Toledo's own President, Asa S. Knowles.

==== Jackie Goldsmith ====
Hogan made his biggest arrest on July 22, two days after the arrests in Toledo, when his office arrested Jackie Goldsmith, a former LIU and professional basketball player turned fixer. Goldsmith was reportedly the "master fixer" and "the sum of all that has been wrong in the basketball picture in recent years". After Goldsmith declined to play in his senior year for unknown reasons, he built connections in gambling and organized crime. Even while playing professionally for several minor leagues, Goldsmith had been "responsible for the corruption of more college basketball games than any other single person". Goldsmith reportedly kept apprised of all match fixing in New York City to advise gamblers that certain games were fixed and if games weren't as he sold them to be as such, he would plead innocence by claiming a double-cross.

===== Bradley University arrests =====
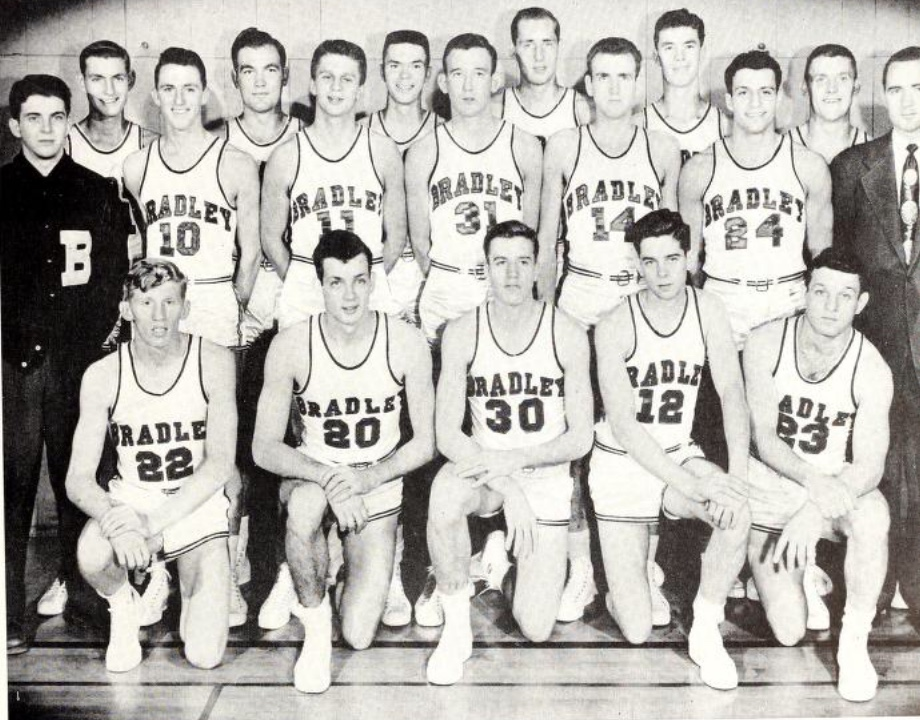
Months after participating in multiple college tournaments against CCNY, multiple players from this Bradley University roster would be implicated in the point-shaving scandal.

On July 24, four days after the arrests in Toledo and two days after the arrest of Goldsmith, detectives from Hogan's office travelled to Peoria, Illinois to arrest three players from Bradley University (Mike Chianakas, Bill Mann, and Gene Melchiorre) for fixing their 1949 NIT consolation game against Bowling Green at Madison Square Garden. Melchiorre, an All-American point guard and the first overall pick of the 1951 NBA draft, was also considered the contact man for the group. The three players, along with teammates Charles Grover, Jim Kelly, Aaron Preece, and Fred Schlictman, admitted that they also fixed four games during the 1949–50 season.

The Bradley investigation in particular revealed threats of physical violence and murder against players and their families, helping law enforcement understand how gamblers ensured that players kept their promise to rig games in the gamblers and fixers' favors. On August 27, Hogan obtained indictments against the Bradley players, along with gamblers Nick and Tony Englisis of Brooklyn; Marvin Mansberg; Jacob Rubinstein; Joseph Benintende of Kansas City, a known narcotics dealer suspected of murdering Charles Binaggio and Charles Gargotta; and Jack West, who had also been questioned in 1947 for allegedly offering a $100,000 bribe (equivalent to $1,408,856.50 in 2024) to boxer Rocky Graziano. The Bradley players also willingly offered to fix games by contacting bookmakers themselves. In at least once case, players attempted to fix games in opposite directions, as was the case in a Bradley–Manhattan game, where Klukofsky offered Melchiorre $500 if Bradley failed to cover the five-point spread, while Byrnes and Poppe on Manhattan accepted a bribe to fail to cover from the other direction. The match in question ended with Bradley winning 89–67, well over the spread in question.

===== University of Kentucky arrests =====
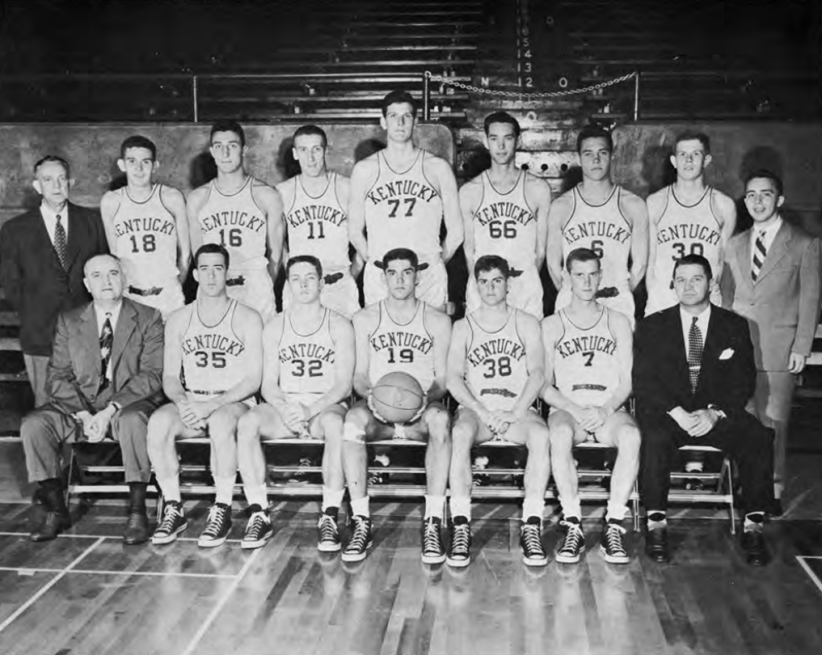
Multiple players who had taken part in the championship winning rosters in 1948, 1949, and 1951 (shown here) were eventually discovered to have also taken part in the point-shaving scandal after their championship season in 1951.

On October 20, former University of Kentucky players Dale Barnstable (who was working as a high school teacher in Louisville at the time of his arrest), Ralph Beard and Alex Groza (both playing for the Indianapolis Olympians in the NBA) were arrested on suspicion that they threw a 1949 first round NIT game against Loyola University Chicago at Madison Square Garden. The arrests came just months after Kentucky won the 1951 NCAA tournament and head coach Adolph Rupp claimed gamblers "couldn't touch [our] students with a ten-foot pole."

Despite his initial comments, the suspicions were first raised by Rupp himself, when he told assistant coach Harry Lancaster and athletic director Bernie Shively that "something was wrong with [this] team" after the Loyola game. Hogan alleged that during the 1948–49 season, eleven different Kentucky games were fixed, beginning with a game against St. John's University at Madison Square Garden. Hogan also alleged that while the team was in New York, the Englisis brothers and former Harvard Law School student Saul Feinberg plotted with the three Kentucky players to fix more games. Barnstable, Beard, and Groza admitted to rigging three games, including the loss to Loyola. Tony Englisis alleged in a 1952 True magazine article that more games had been rigged, but the players denied it, and the New York courts declined to hear cases of match fixing which occurred entirely outside the state. Beard and Groza, who had signed a package deal with the Olympians for a seventy percent share of profits and ownership of the team, with an option to buy the team outright in three years, were permanently banned from the NBA and forced to sell their shares at ten percent of their original value. Despite making the playoffs in every season, the Olympians folded as a franchise in 1953.

Kentucky players Walter Hirsch and Jim Line admitted to complicity in rigging games during the 1948–49 and 1949–50 seasons. Hirsch and Line also implicated Bill Spivey in rigging the 1950 Sugar Bowl against St. Louis, but Spivey was adamant that he had never fixed a game. While no charges were ever filed against Hirsch and Line since all of their match fixing had occurred in states without anti-bribery laws for amateur sports at the time, Assistant District Attorney Vincent A.G. O'Connor indicted Spivey for first degree perjury for failure to truthfully testify that he received $1,000 (equivalent to nearly $13,040 in 2024) for the Sugar Bowl from Jack West. His case ultimately resulted in a mistrial. Hirsch was permanently banned from both the NBA and minor league baseball as a first baseman once the discovery came to light.

The entire Kentucky team would be suspended from basketball play during the 1952–53 NCAA basketball season.

== Trials and sentencing ==
On October 27, 1951, Frank Hogan officially closed the investigation into the point-shaving scandal. In total, thirty-five players from seven colleges admitted to taking bribes between 1947 and 1950 to fix eighty-six games in seventeen states, with varying results and punishments being given out to each player at hand. All thirty-five players involved were permanently banned from the NBA, with some players also banned from other professional sports leagues as well.

With the exception of the initial Manhattan College arrests, the trials were presided over by Judge of the Court of General Sessions Saul S. Streit.

During the trials, Mike Chianakas and Gene Melchiorre of Bradley revealed that they could take easy courses, such as individual gymnastics, elementary badminton, elements of tumbling, golf, boxing, and both social and square dancing in order to maintain easy academic credits and graduate on time. By early October, Chianakas, Melchiorre, and Bill Mann would plead guilty to a misdemeanor, while the rest of the Bradley players would find themselves acquitted in the case.

At sentencing, Judge Streit made scathing remarks on the roles of college officials and coaches and the corruption and commercialization of college athletics as a whole. When Streit sentenced the Bradley players on December 7, 1951, he vigorously castigated Bradley president David B. Owen, who had accompanied the team to all of their away games, blaming Owen and the university's booster club for openly giving money to players after games, paying for bogus jobs, and creating an atmosphere "inimical to sound educational practices". Streit's most damning remarks followed the sentencing of the Kentucky players on April 29, 1952. He issued a 63-page report including a litany of abuses against the university's basketball and football programs as "money-mad". He would also label the university's athletic department in general to be "a highly systematized, professionalized, and commercialized enterprise" and "an acme of commercialization" with budgets comparable to that of professional sports franchises.

Eli Kukofsky died of a heart attack before the end of his trial, leading to all charges against the Toledo players to be dropped.

Sherman White received one year in prison, while his teammates received suspended sentences. Questions regarding White's race have been raised by sports historians with respect to his comparatively harsh sentence.

The following sentences or punishments that were given out by Judge Saul S. Streit, unless stated otherwise:

Role(s)	Name	Sentences / punishments / aftermath
Manhattan player	John Byrnes	by Judge James M. Barrett: three years of probation; permanently banned from the NBA and other professional basketball leagues; was also playing for the Bridgeport Aer-A-Sols in the ABL before his arrest
Manhattan player	Henry "Hank" Poppe	by Judge James M. Barrett: three years of probation; permanently banned from the NBA and other professional basketball leagues; was also playing for the Allentown Aces in the ABL before his arrest
Fixer	Cornelius Kelleher	by Judge James M. Barrett: one year of probation
Fixer	Benjamin Schwartzberg	by Judge James M. Barrett: one year in prison
Fixer	Irving Schwartzberg	by Judge James M. Barrett: one year in prison
NBA referee & accomplice of Salvatore Sollazzo and Eddie Gard	Sol Levy	three years in prison, reduced to a suspended sentence following appeal; fired from his position as a referee from the NBA, if not permanently banned from the NBA and other basketball leagues altogether; was later murdered some time after his release from prison, likely in retaliation by organized crime
CCNY player	Alvin Roth	six months in a workhouse, suspended for service in the United States Army; permanently banned from the NBA
CCNY player	Ed Roman	six months in prison, suspended for service in the United States Army; permanently banned from the NBA
CCNY player	Ed Warner	six months in prison at Rikers Island; permanently banned from the NBA
CCNY player	Herb Cohen	six months in prison, suspended for service in the United States Army; permanently banned from the NBA
CCNY player	Irwin Dambrot	was attending the Columbia University College of Dental Medicine at the time of his arrest; was also playing for the Paterson Crescents in the ABL in his spare time; suspended sentence for realizing the "enormity of his misstep"; permanently banned from the NBA and the ABL; was previously selected 7th by the New York Knicks in the 1950 NBA draft
CCNY player	Norm Mager	suspended sentence; permanently banned from the NBA; was playing with the Baltimore Bullets before his ban
CCNY player	Floyd Layne	suspended sentence; permanently banned from the NBA
NYU player	Harvey "Connie" Schaff	six-month suspended sentence; permanently banned from the NBA
Fixer	Salvatore Sollazzo	eight to sixteen years in a state prison (ultimately served twelve years)
Agent of Salvatore Sollazzo & Long Island player	Eddie Gard	up to three years in prison for two counts of conspiracy (ultimately served nine months); praised by ADA Vincent A.G. O'Connor for cooperation; permanently banned from the NBA
Long Island player	Adolph "Dolph" Bigos	suspended sentence; permanently banned from the NBA
Long Island player	Leroy Smith	suspended sentence; permanently banned from the NBA
Long Island player	Natie "Nat" Miller	suspended sentence; permanently banned from the NBA
Long Island player	Richard "Dick" Feurtado	suspended sentence; permanently banned from the NBA
Long Island player	Louis Lipman	suspended sentence due to previous military service; previously played for the Schenectady Packers and Hartford Hurricanes in the American Basketball League before his arrest; permanently banned from the NBA and the ABL
Long Island player	Sherman White	one year in prison (served close to nine months at Rikers Island); permanently banned from the NBA
Fixer	Eli "Kaye" Klukofsky	suffered a fatal heart attack while awaiting trial
Toledo player	Jack Feeman	charges dropped following death of Eli Klukofsky; permanently banned from the NBA
Toledo player	Bob McDonald	charges dropped following death of Eli Klukofsky; permanently banned from the NBA
Toledo player	Carlos Muzi	charges dropped following death of Eli Klukofsky; permanently banned from the NBA
Toledo player	Bill Walker	charges dropped following death of Eli Klukofsky; permanently banned from the NBA
Bradley player	Charles "Bud" Grover	acquitted; permanently banned from the NBA
Bradley player	Jim Kelly	acquitted; permanently banned from the NBA
Bradley player	Fred Schlictman	acquitted; permanently banned from the NBA
Bradley player	Mike Chianakas	pleaded guilty to misdemeanor for accepting bribes to shave points; praised by ADA Vincent A.G. O'Connor for cooperation; suspended sentence; permanently banned from the NBA
Bradley player	Bill Mann	pleaded guilty to misdemeanor for accepting bribes to shave points; praised by ADA Vincent A.G. O'Connor for cooperation; suspended sentence; permanently banned from the NBA; was selected 21st by the Baltimore Bullets of the 1951 NBA draft before the arrest
Bradley player	Gene Melchiorre	pleaded guilty to misdemeanor for accepting bribes to shave points; praised by ADA Vincent A.G. O'Connor for cooperation; suspended sentence (later had a probation period); permanently banned from the NBA; was selected as the #1 pick of the 1951 NBA draft by the Baltimore Bullets before the arrest
Bradley player	Aaron Preece	pleaded guilty to misdemeanor for accepting bribes to shave points; praised by ADA Vincent A.G. O'Connor for cooperation; suspended sentence; permanently banned from the NBA; was selected 72nd by the Tri-Cities Blackhawks of the 1951 NBA draft before the arrest
Fixer & Long Island player	Jackie Goldsmith	two-and-a-half to four years in prison for fixing games; permanently banned from the NBA; previously played professional basketball in the NBL, PCPBL, and ABL
Gambler	Nick Englisis	up to three years in prison
Gambler	Tony Englisis	six months in prison
Gambler	Joe Benintende	four to seven years in prison
Fixer	Jack West	two to three years in prison
Kentucky player	Dale Barnstable	suspended sentence; indefinite probation; permanently banned from the NBA; barred from professional sports for three years; was previously selected 73rd by the Boston Celtics in the 1950 NBA draft
Kentucky player	Ralph Beard	suspended sentence; indefinite probation; permanently banned from the NBA; barred from professional sports for three years; was playing with the Indianapolis Olympians before the ban
Kentucky player	Alex Groza	suspended sentence; indefinite probation; permanently banned from the NBA; barred from professional sports for three years; was playing with the Indianapolis Olympians before the ban; coached the Kentucky Colonels and San Diego Conquistadors, as well as took on multiple positions for the San Diego Conquistadors/Sails in the ABA during the 1970s
Kentucky player	Walter Hirsch	not formally charged; permanently banned from the NBA and minor league baseball
Kentucky player	Jim Line	acquitted; permanently banned from the NBA
Kentucky player	Bill Spivey	barred from collegiate play on March 2, 1952; indicted for perjury through statements made by Kentucky teammates Walter Hirsch and Jim Line; case resulted in a mistrial and was subsequently dismissed; permanently banned from the NBA; sued the NBA and de facto commissioner Maurice Podoloff in 1960 for $800,000 (equivalent to nearly $8.5 million in 2024) before accepting a settlement of $10,000 (equivalent to $106,140 in 2024); played professional basketball in the American Basketball League (1961–1962)
Columbia player	Jack Molinas	While he was never caught during the initial scandal period in 1951, he would be caught during his later years when playing professional basketball for the Fort Wayne Pistons (now Detroit Pistons) of the NBA. After he got caught gambling during the period before the 1954 NBA All-Star Game took place in January 1954, Molinas was permanently banned from the NBA as a late suspect connected to the scandal alongside him betting on games that he played for the Pistons. Years later, Molinas would be involved as a centerpiece figure in the 1961 NCAA men's basketball gambling scandal that involved 50 players from 27 colleges, including future Hall of Fame players Connie Hawkins and Roger Brown. He would later be given a 10 to 15 year sentence at the Attica Correctional Facility by Judge Joseph Sarafite in relation to the 1961 scandal, though he was ultimately paroled after five years spent in prison for that event. Was later shot to death on August 3, 1975 in what could be seen as a mob-related murder.

== Aftermath ==
Some investigative journalists questioned why the scandal did not reach colleges or universities in Philadelphia or any Catholic institution (outside of Manhattan College). In the book Barney Polan's Game, Charley Rosen suggests that some players from St. John's University were also involved in match fixing. Hogan countered claims of pro-Catholic bias by stating that the main players and gamblers involved were apprehended and that further punishments would be given out in order to help prevent future corruption. Ultimately, the scandal did little to reduce corruption or bribery in college sports and involvement with gambling, and CCNY coach Nat Holman wrote in 1954 that gambling in college basketball was as rampant as ever and that the game would once again be tainted by scandal. In 1961, an even broader scandal resulted in the arrests of 37 students from 22 different colleges and implicated hundreds more.

The scandal had long-lasting effects for some of the individuals and programs involved, as well as college basketball itself.

- Sherman White was barred from college play after being only seventy-seven points short of the all-time college scoring record, with the New York Knicks also being barred from selecting him as their territorial pick in the 1951 NBA draft.
- Gene Melchiorre, who had been the first overall pick in the 1951 NBA draft by the Baltimore Bullets, was barred for life.
- Bill Spivey sued the NBA and de facto commissioner Maurice Podoloff in 1960 for $800,000 (equivalent to nearly $8.5 million in 2024) before accepting a settlement of $10,000 (equivalent to $106,140 in 2024). After playing professional basketball for the rivaling American Basketball League in the early 1960s, Spivey was eventually able to technically play an NBA game on February 11, 1968, when he participated in an exhibition game organized in Baltimore by the most recent iteration of the Bullets at that time between the Eastern Basketball League's Baltimore Bullets All-Star team and the original Baltimore Bullets All-Star team of past ABL, BAA, and NBA talents.
- The Indianapolis Olympians folded operations in 1953 after both Ralph Beard and Alex Groza were forced to sell their shares in the team as losses due to their involvement in the scandal.
- The original version of the American Basketball League would note that the intended inclusion of a few players involved from this scandal (Ralph Beard, Alex Groza, Gene Melchiorre, and Sherman White for an intended new ABL team called the Jersey City Titans alongside Bill Spivey for the Elmira Colonels) would become the final, major catalyst for that league's ultimate destruction, as their protest over those four potentially joining the ABL following their controversies with the point-shaving scandal led to the Jersey City Titans leaving the league without playing a single game and the Elmira Colonels almost joining them (thus subsequently cancelling what later became their final season of play) before Elmira changed their minds on that situation and waived Spivey to allow the ABL to continue play for one more season. After the ABL completed their final season of play in 1953 with little fanfare, they attempted to reorganize their league to the best of their abilities, but with a limited number of competitive teams, one of their teams not having available benches for fans to sit on to cheer their team on, and another team having their owner suddenly pass away from a heart attack, the ABL ultimately decided to suspend operations on October 16, 1953 before later disbanding entirely for good by their 1954–55 season had that occurred for them.

Some figures involved in the scandal, such as Eddie Gard, would later play semi-professional basketball in the summer.

=== Kentucky ===
Kentucky cancelled one season of play following the university's involvement in the scandal and accusations of an overemphasis on athletics at the expense of academics. However, it was the only program that was not permanently hobbled by the scandal. The scandal forced Adolph Rupp to renege on plans to resign from coaching for health reasons that he first had at the time. He continued working as a head coach for Kentucky until 1972, winning another NCAA championship for the program in 1958. To date, Bradley is the only other affected school to have appeared in a final major media poll since 1951 (being the runner-up again in 1954), with NYU being the only other program to reach as far as the Final Four since then.

=== CCNY ===
Following the discovery of several other irregularities involved with the program, CCNY would deemphasize athletics entirely and eventually became a Division III program. In November 1952, the New York Board of Education's Committee on Intercollegiate Basketball made further revelations that ultimately led to the demise of the CCNY program, including fourteen fraudulent transcripts, an illegal recruiting mechanism in the Student Athletic Academic Council, and plans for a South American tour that would have paid players. Nat Holman and assistant Bobby Sand initially resigned from their positions before ultimately returning in 1954, for everything outside of bad judgment and Sand being demoted to other duties instead.

=== Long Island ===
Following Long Island's 1951 expansion separating the main campus of Long Island University, Brooklyn from the then-newly created C.W. Post Campus of Long Island University, LIU Brooklyn fired basketball coach Clair Bee and shut down its entire athletic program from 1951 to 1957, with LIU Brooklyn competing separately as a Division II program afterward. Bee would later coach the Baltimore Bullets in the NBA from 1952–1954 in the franchise's final seasons of operation (including their final full season of play and a majority of their final season of play) before retiring from coaching altogether. The school did not return to Division I sports properly until the 1980s. Beginning in July 2019, the LIU Post Pioneers merged with the long-standing LIU Brooklyn Blackbirds to form a new Division I program, reunifying the locations for the first time since their separation in 1951 to become the LIU Sharks.

=== New York University ===
Following a surprising Final Four appearance amidst the subsequent 1961 scandal implicating New York University in the early 1960s, the Violets would disband their athletics programs for financial reasons in 1971 before reinstating them in 1983 as a Division III team. The Violets would start seeing newer, greater success as a Division III program since then.

=== Jack Molinas ===
In 1954, Jack Molinas of the Fort Wayne Pistons was suspended and later permanently banned for gambling by the NBA for betting on games involving his own team. He was ultimately linked back to the 1951 scandal by bets he had also placed on his then-college team, Columbia University, working alongside another gambler that had slipped through the cracks at the time (specifically a brother-in-law of one of the gamblers arrested). Molinas later became an associate of the Genovese crime family and a central player in one of the most wide-reaching college basketball point-shaving scandals in 1961.

Interestingly, during his junior year in high school (in 1948), when he also was playing for the Hacken All-Stars (an independent team that mostly involved young high school students owned by bookmaker Joe Hacken, who not only was a longtime friend of Jack Molinas even back then, but also would later be involved in a future scandal with him years later, that went up against both college and amateur teams in various tournaments and exhibition matches), Molinas and the rest of the Hacken All-Stars would practice at CCNY, where Howard Cann would often try and recruit the young players like him into joining CCNY.

== Legacy ==
=== Documentaries ===
In 1998, George Roy and Steven Hilliard Stern, Black Canyon Productions, and HBO Sports made a documentary film about the CCNY Point Shaving Scandal, City Dump: The Story of the 1951 CCNY Basketball Scandal, that appeared on HBO. Initially, six of the surviving point-shavers of the time and Eddie Gard were discussed to have been involved in the documentary, but they would all back out, with most of them looking for financial compensation for participating in the documentary. However, Junius Kellogg and the now former Assistant District Attorney Vincent A.G. O'Connor would appear in the documentary, with archived footage of Frank Hogan also being shown as well.

The story is also detailed in The First Basket, a 2008 documentary covering the history of Jewish players in basketball.

=== In popular culture ===
- A 1951 movie, The Basketball Fix, was based on the scandal.
- Jay Neugeboren's 1966 novel Big Man is based on what happens to an All-American African American basketball star five years after he was caught in this scandal.
- The scandal is referenced in the second episode of the fifth season of the HBO series The Sopranos, "Rat Pack", first broadcast on March 14, 2004. After learning of the death of New York mob boss Carmine Lupertazzi, Junior Soprano says that Lupertazzi invented point shaving: "CCNY versus Kentucky, 1951. Nobody beat the spread. I bought a black Fleetwood."

== See also ==
- List of people banned or suspended by the NBA
- 1946 NFL Championship Game, an earlier major sports scandal in New York that involved Frank Hogan's services
- William & Mary scandal of 1951, another college scandal going on around the same time
- 1950s quiz show scandals, a contemporaneous scandal and criminal case involving rigged television quiz shows that also involved Frank Hogan's services
- 1961 NCAA University Division men's basketball gambling scandal
