= Bill Spivey =

American basketball player (1929–1995)

Personal information
- Born: March 19, 1929 Lakeland, Florida, U.S.
- Died: May 8, 1995 (aged 66) Quepos, Costa Rica
- Listed height: 7 ft 0 in (2.13 m)
- Listed weight: 200 lb (91 kg)

Career information
- College: Kentucky (1949–1951)
- Playing career: 1952–1968
- Position: Center
- Number: 77

Career history
- 1952: Elmira Colonels
- 1957–1959: Wilkes-Barre Barons
- 1959–1961: Baltimore Bullets
- 1961–1962: Long Beach / Hawaii Chiefs
- 1963–1967: Scranton Miners

Career highlights
- 3× EPBL champion (1958, 1959, 1961); EPBL Most Valuable Player (1959); 2× All-EPBL First Team (1959, 1960); 2× All-EPBL Second Team (1961, 1965); All-ABL Second Team (1962); NCAA champion (1951); Consensus first-team All-American (1951); Third-team All-American – AP (1950); 2× First-team All-SEC (1950, 1951)

William Edwin Spivey (March 19, 1929 – May 8, 1995) was an American basketball player. A 7 ft 0 in (2.13 m) center, he played college basketball for the National Collegiate Athletic Association's (NCAA) Kentucky Wildcats from 1949 to 1951. After his high school career, Spivey was recruited by the University of Kentucky. During his time with the Wildcats, he led the team to the 1951 NCAA tournament championship. When a point shaving scandal was revealed that year, Spivey was accused of being involved, which he denied. He left the Wildcats in December 1951, and the university banned him from the squad in March 1952.

After he testified before a grand jury in New York, he was indicted on perjury charges. Although Spivey was not convicted when the case went to trial in 1953, he was prevented from competing in the National Basketball Association (NBA) afterward. Spivey instead played professionally for various minor league teams. In 10 Eastern Professional Basketball League (EPBL) seasons, his teams won three championships. Spivey retired in 1968 and became a businessman, working in sales and operating restaurants. Upset by the accusations against him in the early 1950s, he was reclusive in his final years.

== Early life ==
William Edwin Spivey was born in Lakeland, Florida, and had moved to Columbus, Georgia, by 1944, at which time he was 6 ft 9 in (2.06 m). After taking up basketball, he played for his high school's team and had 18 points in his first half of game action. The following year, he moved to Warner Robins, Georgia, which did not have a basketball team before he arrived. The principal of Warner Robins' high school created a team, however, once Spivey came. During one of his high school seasons, he was forced to play without shoes—since none of the school's shoes fit him—and wear three pairs of socks. Spivey had over 1,800 points in his three-year high school career.

== College career ==
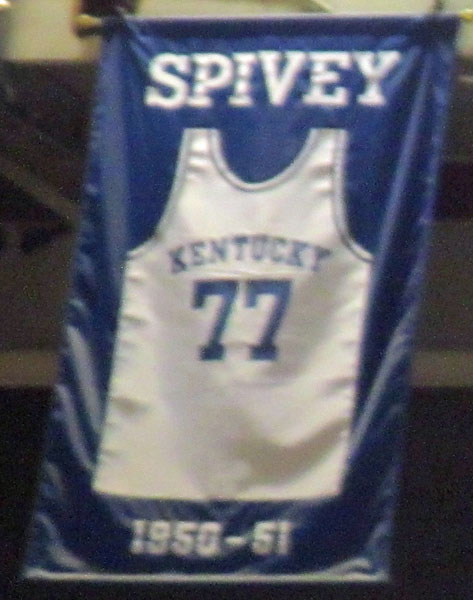
A jersey honoring Spivey hangs in Rupp Arena.

=== Recruitment ===
Several universities wanted to give Spivey a basketball scholarship in 1948. The University of Kentucky first became aware of Spivey when a Georgia newspaper executive told Fred Wachs, whom writer Earl Cox said "pretty much ran Lexington", about him. After hearing of Spivey from the executive, Wachs notified Kentucky's men's basketball coach, Adolph Rupp, who elected to have a former Wildcats player watch Spivey. Following positive feedback from the player, Rupp invited Spivey to try out for a spot on the team against other leading high school players. After the tryout, Spivey received a scholarship.

=== 1948–49 to 1949–50 ===
Even though he offered a scholarship to the seven-foot Spivey, Rupp was concerned about his weight, which was between 160 and 165 pounds. Rupp told him that he would play only if he added 40 pounds (18 kg), and Spivey bulked up to 200 pounds (91 kg) during the summer of 1948. Spivey spent his first year at Kentucky on a freshman team, while the varsity team won its second consecutive NCAA Basketball Championship in 1949. The U.S. Olympic team, which had six Wildcats players on it, practiced in Lexington, and Spivey gained knowledge and skills from team members Alex Groza, Vince Boryla and Bob Kurland. Spivey also competed in games against other freshman teams, including one against Xavier in which he posted 31 points. In 15 games, he averaged about 20 points per game.

In the 1949–50 season, the Wildcats lost several of the leading players from their championship-winning teams to graduation, including Ralph Beard and Groza. In response, Rupp made Spivey the focal point of the team, and the team exceeded expectations. In a February 18, 1950 game against Georgia Tech, which the Wildcats won 97–62, Spivey broke the team record for points in a game with 40, two more than Groza scored in a game the previous season. That record has since been broken, but his 42 field goal attempts remain a school record as of 2017. Spivey tied another of Groza's point-scoring records on March 5 with a 37-point performance in a Southeastern Conference (SEC) men's basketball tournament game. Kentucky won over Tennessee 95–58 to win the SEC Tournament for the seventh consecutive season. Kentucky ended the regular season with a 25–4 record, and Spivey averaged 19.4 points a game. Despite the Wildcats' record and SEC title, the NCAA Tournament selection committee did not give the team a berth in the 1950 tournament. Kentucky did gain a berth to the National Invitation Tournament, but was eliminated in the quarterfinals by City College of New York (CCNY), 89–50. In that game, Spivey was forced to the bench for the final nine minutes of the first half after accumulating four personal fouls. At the end of the season, Spivey was named to the All-SEC team, and the Associated Press selected him for its 1950 All-American third team.

=== 1950–51 ===
Kentucky played a much-anticipated game versus Kansas on December 16, 1950, with Spivey matched up against Jayhawks center Clyde Lovellette. The Wildcats won by 29 points as Spivey outplayed Lovellette, in what he later called the best performance of his college career. After one steal, he drove to the Kansas basket and did a slam dunk; this was rare for Kentucky basketball at the time, as Rupp instructed players not to dunk during games. Spivey set another school record in a February 13, 1951, game, gathering 34 rebounds. As of 2017, he remains tied for the team record with Bob Burrow, who had the same number of rebounds in a 1955 game. For the season, Spivey again averaged more than 19 points per game, and he added 17.2 rebounds per game. His point total led the SEC, and his 479 regular season points were the third-most in league history at the time.

The Wildcats had a 28–2 record during the regular season, and entered the postseason as the top-ranked team in the country. One of those losses came in the SEC Tournament against Vanderbilt, but it did not affect the team's prospects for an NCAA Tournament berth because the SEC had decided to send its regular season champion to the newly expanded 16-team tournament. Kentucky advanced to the Tournament's Final Four, where Spivey had 28 points and 16 rebounds in a 76–74 win over Illinois. The Wildcats then faced Kansas State in the NCAA championship game. Despite falling behind early in the contest, they took the lead in the second half and pulled away to win 68–58. Spivey played an important role in the victory, scoring 22 points and pulling down 21 rebounds. Rupp said after the game that "Spivey made the difference after he went to work." After the game, no vote was taken nor was a player presented with the Most Outstanding Player award, although contemporary sources agree that Spivey would have likely won the award. Despite the award never being officially presented, the official NCAA record book lists Spivey as the 1951 Most Outstanding Player. He was later selected to the 1951 All-American team, as well as the All-SEC team for the second straight season.

== Implication in gambling scandal ==
The CCNY point shaving scandal was revealed in 1951. A series of college basketball players had conspired with gamblers to shave points to ensure that their teams lost against the point spread. According to Manhattan District Attorney Frank Hogan, 32 players were involved in point shaving or match fixing, and 86 games were affected. That figure included three ex-Kentucky players: Dale Barnstable, Beard, and Groza, who engaged in point shaving during a 1949 National Invitation Tournament game. Having been sidelined in the early part of the 1951–52 season after knee surgery, Spivey gave up his eligibility to play for the Wildcats on December 24, 1951. He denied rumors that he was involved in the scandal, calling them "false and malicious".

Spivey intended to return to the Wildcats once the situation was resolved, which Kentucky's athletic association expected before reinstatement. On February 16, 1952, he and the association's directors agreed to have him testify before a grand jury in New York. After Spivey's grand jury appearance later in February, however, the university banned him permanently on March 2. In its statement, Kentucky's athletic board said evidence pointed to him fixing games during the 1950 Sugar Bowl basketball tournament. Gambler Jack West was charged with bribing two Wildcats players, Spivey and Walter Hirsch, to engage in point shaving during one of the tournament's games, and eventually pleaded guilty. In his grand jury testimony, Spivey denied receiving $1,000 ($13,382 in 2025) to shave points in games from December 1950 to January 1951, or talking about doing so with gamblers. He was the only implicated player to deny allegations of point shaving. In April, the grand jury indicted him on charges of perjury for lying under oath during his testimony, claiming he had done so on seven occasions.

=== Trial ===
On June 9, Spivey was arrested in New York, and was released pending a trial, which started in January 1953. Hirsch testified that Spivey asked to be included as a point shaver, and was upset that the payment for his role in shaving during the 1950 Sugar Bowl tournament was less than he anticipated. This, however, contradicted his original grand jury testimony, which had no mention of Spivey's involvement. Hirsch also told the grand jury that Spivey and West, the ringleader, had not met. West declined to testify, leading to criminal contempt charges against him. Spivey again denied taking part in the scandal, stating that he had turned down a different gambler on two occasions. According to him, ex-teammate Jim Line mentioned his name to the grand jury; Spivey said he learned this from Line. John Y. Brown Sr., the attorney representing Spivey, argued that Hirsch and Line had lied to gamblers in claiming that they had given Spivey a share of the point shaving proceeds. The trial lasted for 13 days before the case went to a jury. By a 9–3 margin, the majority of jurors supported acquittal for Spivey, and the hung jury caused a mistrial. The grand jury eventually dropped the charges against Spivey.

== Professional career ==
Although Spivey was not found guilty in the scandal, he found himself blackballed from the National Basketball Association (NBA) after league president Maurice Podoloff banned all 32 players involved in the CCNY scandal for life. The Cincinnati Royals later tried to sign Spivey, but Podoloff refused to approve the contract. Spivey filed a lawsuit against the NBA and Podoloff in 1960, seeking more than $800,000 ($8.71 million in 2025) in damages. Afterward, he claimed that his rights under the Sherman Antitrust Act had been violated and sued the league in federal court, dropping his initial case. In response, Podoloff offered to settle with Spivey for $10,000 ($108,830 in 2025), which he accepted. According to sportswriter Jim Murray, Spivey felt that he had no choice but to accept because the court schedule was so full that even if he had won his case, he would have been too old to be a viable NBA prospect in any case. Future Kentucky coach Joe B. Hall said that "most people feel [Spivey] would have been one of the top five centers of all-time had he had the chance to mature in the NBA." Instead, Spivey spent his professional career playing for numerous minor league and barnstorming teams.

=== 1952–53 to 1956–57 ===
In October 1952, Spivey played in two games for the American Basketball League's Elmira Colonels, scoring 21 and 32 points in the contests. That season, he also was a member of the Detroit Vagabond Kings barnstorming team. For the next three seasons, he spent time with three teams connected to the Harlem Globetrotters exhibition team: the Boston Whirlwinds, the House of David, and the Washington Generals. In one game with the Whirlwinds, Spivey got into a fight with Globetrotters player Bobby "Showboat" Hall. For the 1955–56 and 1956–57 seasons, Spivey played for another barnstorming team, the New York Olympians, later renamed the Kentucky Colonels.

=== 1957–58 to 1962–63 ===
Beginning with the 1957–58 season, Spivey spent 10 of his remaining 12 professional seasons in the Eastern Professional Basketball League (EPBL). The first two of those EBL seasons were spent with the Wilkes-Barre Barons, and Spivey led the team to consecutive league championships. On April 20, 1958, he scored 62 points in the title-clinching game against the Easton Madisons, setting an EPBL playoff record. In 1958–59, he became the first player in league history with a 1,000-point season, and had 64 points in a March 1959 game. That season, he was named the league's most valuable player. Along with his play in the EPBL, Spivey reached an agreement to join the Ansonia Norwoods of the semi-professional Connecticut Basketball Association (CBA) in 1958. Over two years with the Norwoods, his points-per-game average exceeded 30.0.

Spivey moved to the Baltimore Bullets for the 1959–60 season, and played two seasons for the club. In Spivey's first season with the Bullets, he had 36.3 points per game, the highest average of his EPBL career. Outside EBL competition, he received an opportunity to play opposite leading NBA center Wilt Chamberlain in a 1960 exhibition game, held in Milford, Connecticut, against the CBA's Milford Chiefs. Spivey had a 30-point, 23-rebound performance; his statistics were comparable to those of Chamberlain, who recorded a 31-point, 27-rebound game.

The Bullets won the league championship in 1960–61, after which Spivey played two seasons in a different American Basketball League (ABL), with the Los Angeles Jets and Long Beach–Hawaii Chiefs. Spivey was named to the 1961–62 All-ABL Second Team after averaging 22.7 points per game and 11.2 rebounds per game with the Chiefs; his total of 1,773 points was second behind Connie Hawkins. In the 1962–63 season, which was shortened when the league suspended operations, he had an average of 22.5 points per game in 24 games with Long Beach. In ABL history, Spivey was third in points scored and fourth in rebounds.

=== 1963–64 to 1967–68 ===
Spivey returned to the EPBL in 1963 to join the Scranton Miners, for whom he played five seasons. His highest scoring average for the Miners came in the 1964–65 season, when he had 27.0 points per game. In 1967–68, his final professional season, Spivey went back to the Barons. Playing for about $200 ($1,931 in 2025) in salary per contest, he had 10.4 points per game. On February 11, 1968, Spivey participated in his final professional game. Taking advantage of a loophole in the NBA's rules, he took part in an all-star game in Baltimore featuring former Baltimore Bullets players before a Bullets – San Diego Rockets game. Spivey led both teams by scoring 12 points, but his team lost by one point. One day later he retired, saying "It really meant something for me to finish off my career with a game like that." By the end of his career, Spivey's physical condition had declined; Lou Tsioropoulos, who had played with him at Kentucky, said, "He was just completely disabled. He could barely walk."

== Later life ==
After retiring from basketball, Spivey became a businessman, and moved back to Kentucky. The majority of his jobs involved sales; these included the selling of building materials and insurance. He also helped to develop real estate and owned restaurants, including a Lexington-based eatery, Bill Spivey's Restaurant and Lounge. For a time he was the state's deputy insurance commissioner. Spivey ran in the primary election for Lieutenant Governor of Kentucky in 1983 as a Democrat, but came in last in the seven-person race.

Spivey made his final public appearance in 1991, at a reunion of the 1950–51 Kentucky Wildcats men's basketball team in Lexington. Writer Greg Doyel says that "he was a recluse" at the time. According to his wife, Audrey Spivey, "He never got over [his accusation in the 1951 college basketball scandal]. Bill could not let that go. He was just devastated." Then living in Daytona Beach, Florida, he was later hurt in an automobile accident, which aggravated a lower-back injury. Spivey's son, Cashton, said that "He never made a full recovery from that. It affected his posture, and he had chronic pain from that." In a post-accident bone grafting operation, a piece of equipment became lodged in Spivey's lower back; according to Cashton, he won a small amount from the hospital in a lawsuit.

Spivey moved to Quepos, Costa Rica, around 1993, after vacationing there with a friend six months before. Audrey did not come with him, although the couple did not separate legally. On May 8, 1995, he was found dead of natural causes at the age of 66. Spivey received two notable honors posthumously: his jersey number, 77, was retired by the University of Kentucky in January 2000, and the Kentucky Sports Hall of Fame inducted him in September 2004.

== See also ==
- List of people banned or suspended by the NBA
