= List of people banned or suspended by the NBA =

Under Article 24 of the National Basketball Association (NBA) Constitution, the NBA commissioner has the power to hand down disciplinary actions (either suspensions or fines less than $60,000) on players for on-court incidents, conduct that does not conform to standards of fair play, conduct that does not comply with federal or state laws, and conduct that is detrimental to the game of basketball or the league. As defined by the 2005 Collective Bargaining Agreement (CBA) between the National Basketball Players Association (NBPA) and the NBA, any party (a player, a team, the NBA or the NBPA) can appeal to an arbitrator if a suspension is longer than 12 games or a fine is more than $50,000. If an appeal is filed, the arbitrator would have the power to either uphold or reject the decisions made by the commissioner. If the incident is serious enough, such as point shaving or substance abuse, players can be permanently banned from playing, although players banned for substance abuse are permitted to be reinstated two years later under the anti-drug agreement between the league and the NBPA.

In the league's early years, a handful of players were banned permanently because of their involvement with point shaving in college, although Connie Hawkins was able to overturn the ban through litigation. Several more were banned permanently for abusing banned substances and they usually never returned, though some players like Micheal Ray Richardson and Chris Andersen were able to return to play after their bans were repealed. Among those suspended, Metta Sandiford-Artest (formerly known as Ron Artest at the time and then Metta World Peace later in his career) and Latrell Sprewell faced the most serious punishments for on-court altercations; they were suspended for 86 and 68 games, respectively. Gilbert Arenas was also suspended for more than half of a regular season's games for bringing firearms into an arena and drawing them in a dispute with teammate Javaris Crittenton, who also got suspended for the rest of that season himself. In more recent years, under Adam Silver's tenure as commissioner, other people involved with NBA teams beyond just the players have faced serious punishments for their actions themselves. Most notably, former Los Angeles Clippers owner Donald Sterling was permanently banned from the NBA for a leaked conversation condemning black people from coming to his games, primarily former Los Angeles Lakers player Magic Johnson. However, Golden State Warriors minority owner Mark Stevens, then-Phoenix Suns majority owner Robert Sarver, and then-Boston Celtics head coach Ime Udoka have also faced season-long suspensions for actions considered detrimental to the league. However, players are also eligible for long-term suspensions or permanent bannings in the event they do something egregious themselves under Silver's tenure, such as O. J. Mayo for substance abuse or Jontay Porter for gambling purposes.

== Permanently banned and never reinstated ==
Only three individuals who were not players were permanently banned or have been permanently banned from the NBA directly. One person was a referee that had fixed NBA games during the early days of the league's existence at the time. Another individual was a college student who was mistaken for a student-athlete at the time that was also involved with a major college scandal as a game fixer. Finally, the last individual was a team owner who was banned for egregious behavior revealed to the public behind the scenes. The rest of the names involved were players who were banned either during their NBA careers or before they ever had a chance to start their professional basketball careers.

=== Via the 1951 college basketball point-shaving scandal ===
The first major instance of permanent bans being used throughout the NBA revolved around the case of the 1951 college basketball point-shaving scandal that primarily happened in 1951. As a result of this incident, 36 different collegiate players (including a few that were either already in the NBA or were drafted into the NBA by this time) and one NBA referee were reported to have been involved with this case at the time were permanently banned from the league due to said involvement (either confirmed or alleged) in this scandal, with one specific player only being caught years after the initial scandal died down.

Name	Team(s)	Year(s)	Season(s)	Reason
John Byrnes	—	1950; 1951	1950–51	On January 17, 1951, Byrnes and Manhattan College teammate Henry Poppe were both arrested alongside three other men for the purpose of fixing a college basketball game. Both Byrnes and Poppe were given suspended sentences, put on probation for three years, and given the first official bannings from the NBA in what became the precursor to the 1951 college basketball point-shaving scandal.
Henry "Hank" Poppe	—	1950; 1951	1950–51	On January 17, 1951, Poppe and Manhattan College teammate John Byrnes were both arrested alongside three other men for the purpose of fixing a college basketball game. Both Poppe and Byrnes were given suspended sentences, put on probation for three years, and given the first official bannings from the NBA in what became the precursor to the 1951 college basketball point-shaving scandal.
Sol Levy	—	1950; 1951	1950–51	In 1951, Levy was effectively removed from his position as a referee in the NBA that he held for three seasons, if not outright permanently banned from the NBA entirely, after it was discovered he had arranged the outcome of "fixing" six NBA games in 1950 under the discretion of former Long Island University basketball player Eddie Gard as an accomplice of his. Levy was later sentenced to three years in prison for his work in "fixing" those NBA games, though ultimately won an appeal after spending a year in prison due to a technicality. Levy could be considered the first person within the NBA proper to be permanently banned from the NBA in that case following the revelation that he fixed games within the league.
Alvin Roth	—	1951	1950–51	In 1951, Roth, a City College of New York player, was banned permanently for his involvement in the 1951 college basketball point-shaving scandal, with him avoiding prison time from it by choosing to join the United States Army as a private for two years.
Ed Roman	—	1951	1950–51	In 1951, Roman, a City College of New York player, was banned permanently for his involvement in the 1951 college basketball point-shaving scandal.
Ed Warner	—	1951	1950–51	In 1951, Warner, a City College of New York player, was banned permanently for his involvement in the 1951 college basketball point-shaving scandal after being sentenced to six months in prison in Rikers Island due to a previous run-in with the law he had earlier on before the scandal occurred.
Harvey "Connie" Schaff	—	1951	1950–51	In 1951, Schaff, a New York University player, was banned permanently for his involvement in the 1951 college basketball point-shaving scandal.
Eddie Gard	—	1950; 1951	1950–51	On February 18, 1951, Gard, a former Long Island University player and agent to greedy jeweler turned game fixer Salvatore "Tarto" Sollazzo at the time of his arrest, was first arrested alongside Sollazzo, Schaff, Warner, Roman, and Roth. After originally being given a three year sentence in prison for his involvement with gambling before only serving nine months in the end for helping out in his case, Gard was permanently banned from the NBA and other professional sports leagues for his role in the 1951 college basketball point-shaving scandal.
Adolph "Dolph" Bigos	—	1951	1950–51	In 1951, Bigos, a Long Island University player, was banned permanently for his involvement in the 1951 college basketball point-shaving scandal.
Leroy Smith	—	1951	1950–51	In 1951, Smith, a Long Island University player, was banned permanently for his involvement in the 1951 college basketball point-shaving scandal.
Sherman White	—	1951	1950–51	On February 20, 1951, White, a Long Island University player, was arrested alongside Long Island teammates Smith and Bigos. After originally being given a year-long prison sentence at Rikers Island before only serving eight months and twenty-four days there, White was banned permanently for his involvement in the 1951 college basketball point-shaving scandal. He was originally intended to have been selected by the New York Knicks with a territorial pick in the 1951 NBA draft before he was caught in the scandal.
Floyd Layne	—	1951	1950–51	In 1951, Layne, a City College of New York player, was banned permanently for his involvement in the 1951 college basketball point-shaving scandal alongside Long Island player Natie "Nat" Miller for his involvement in the 1951 college basketball point-shaving scandal after Eddie Gard told police about their involvement in the scandal as well.
Natie "Nat" Miller	—	1951	1950–51	On February 27, 1951, Miller, a Long Island University player, was arrested and later banned permanently alongside CCNY player Floyd Layne for his involvement in the 1951 college basketball point-shaving scandal after Eddie Gard told police about their involvement in the scandal as well.
Herbert "Herb" Cohen	—	1951	1950–51	In 1951, Cohen, a City College of New York player, was banned permanently for his involvement in the 1951 college basketball point-shaving scandal.
Irwin Dambrot	New York Knicks	1950	1950–51	In 1951, Dambrot, a former City College of New York player, a seventh overall pick of the New York Knicks in the 1950 NBA draft, and a graduate student and dental student at the Columbia University College of Dental Medicine at the time of his arrest, was given a permanent ban from the NBA due to his involvement in the 1951 college basketball point-shaving scandal. While he had considered his path to the NBA unlikely at the time due to his decision to get a greater education for dentistry instead, the decision for said banning was still made final all the same for Dambrot.
Norm Mager	Baltimore Bullets	1950	1950–51	On March 26, 1951, Mager was arrested alongside former City College of New York teammates Cohen and Dambrot despite him playing in the NBA by this point in time. He was later banned permanently as a result of shaving points while playing in college alongside his other teammates that were implicated in that case. Mager would technically be considered the first official NBA player to ever be banned properly from the NBA due to his banning occurring while he was playing for the original Baltimore Bullets franchise in the NBA.
Louis "Lou" Lipman	—	1949; 1951	1950–51	On March 30, 1951, Lipman, a Long Island University player, was arrested under suspicions of match fixing the January 1, 1949 match Long Island had against Duquesne University. He was later given a permanent banning in relation to the 1951 college basketball point-shaving scandal.
Richard "Dick" Fuertado	—	1949; 1951	1950–51	On April 13, 1951, Fuertado, a Long Island University player, was accused of dumping games himself all the way back in 1949 before his name was brought up in the 1951 college basketball point-shaving scandal altogether. Despite later being handed a suspended sentence in that point-shaving scandal, he was still given a permanent banning afterward due to his association at hand in the case.
Jack Feeman	—	1951	1951–52	On July 20, 1951, Feeman was one of four University of Toledo basketball players named under fixer Eli "Kaye" Klukofsky after his arrest that day as different players that had dumped games for him either two or three years earlier. Despite having his charges dropped in the end (likely due to Klukofsky having a fatal heart attack before hearing awaiting his trial and hearing his verdict), he would still be permanently banned from the NBA alongside the other players named from Klukofsky due to their relation in the 1951 college basketball point-shaving scandal.
Bob McDonald	—	1951	1951–52	On July 20, 1951, McDonald was one of four University of Toledo basketball players named under fixer Eli "Kaye" Klukofsky after his arrest that day as different players that had dumped games for him either two or three years earlier. Despite having his charges dropped in the end (likely due to Klukofsky having a fatal heart attack before hearing awaiting his trial and hearing his verdict), he would still be permanently banned from the NBA alongside the other players named from Klukofsky due to their relation in the 1951 college basketball point-shaving scandal.
Carlos Muzi	—	1951	1951–52	On July 20, 1951, Muzi was one of four University of Toledo basketball players named under fixer Eli "Kaye" Klukofsky after his arrest that day as different players that had dumped games for him either two or three years earlier. Despite having his charges dropped in the end (likely due to Klukofsky having a fatal heart attack before hearing awaiting his trial and hearing his verdict), he would still be permanently banned from the NBA alongside the other players named from Klukofsky due to their relation in the 1951 college basketball point-shaving scandal.
Bill Walker	—	1951	1951–52	On July 20, 1951, Walker was one of four University of Toledo basketball players named under fixer Eli "Kaye" Klukofsky after his arrest that day as different players that had dumped games for him either two or three years earlier. Despite having his charges dropped in the end (likely due to Klukofsky having a fatal heart attack before hearing awaiting his trial and hearing his verdict), he would still be permanently banned from the NBA alongside the other players named from Klukofsky due to their relation in the 1951 college basketball point-shaving scandal.
Jackie Goldsmith	—	1949; 1951	1951–52	On July 22, 1951, Goldsmith, a former Long Island University, National Basketball League (NBL), and American Basketball League (ABL) player, was arrested for his involvement in the 1951 college basketball point-shaving scandal, specifically in games revolving around Long Island with Eddie Gard and Manhattan College with players John Byrnes and Henry Poppe. Goldsmith was ultimately given a two-and-a-half to four year prison sentence for his primary role in the point shaving scandal, which was the largest sentence given to a player (current at the time or former) involved in that scandal. Despite not playing professionally since 1949 following a brief stint with the Brooklyn Gothams in the original ABL, Goldsmith was still issued a permanent ban from the NBA and other professional sports leagues for what he had done.
Charles "Bud" Grover	—	1951	1951–52	On July 24, 1951, Grover alongside four other Bradley University basketball players (current or former at the time) admitted to taking bribes from gamblers to hold down scores in multiple specific games of interest. He was later acquitted in the case alongside three other students from Bradley, but he was still permanently banned from the NBA due to his association with the point-shaving case.
Jim Kelly	—	1951	1951–52	On July 24, 1951, Kelly alongside four other Bradley University basketball players that had since graduated and mostly been drafted by other NBA teams by this time admitted to taking bribes from gamblers to hold down scores in multiple specific games of interest. He was later acquitted in the case alongside three other students from Bradley, but he was still permanently banned from the NBA due to his association with the point-shaving case.
Bill Mann	Baltimore Bullets	1951	1951–52	On July 24, 1951, only months after being selected as the 21st pick of the 1951 NBA draft by the Baltimore Bullets, Mann alongside four other Bradley University basketball players (current or former at the time) admitted to taking bribes from gamblers to hold down scores in multiple specific games of interest. Originally, Mann was looking at a three year sentence in prison by Judge Saul S. Streit after pleading guilty to a misdemeanor by accepting bribes from gamblers to hold down scores before praise from Assistant District Attorney Vincent A.J. O'Connor led to him getting a suspended sentence instead. Despite the leniency, he was still given a permanent banning from the NBA in relation to the point-shaving scandal.
Gene Melchiorre	Baltimore Bullets	1951	1951–52	On July 24, 1951, only months after being selected as the #1 pick of the 1951 NBA draft by the Baltimore Bullets, Melchiorre alongside four other Bradley University basketball players (current or former at the time) admitted to taking bribes from gamblers to hold down scores in multiple specific games of interest. Originally, Melchiorre was looking at a three year sentence in prison by Judge Saul S. Streit after pleading guilty to a misdemeanor by accepting bribes from gamblers to hold down scores before praise from Assistant District Attorney Vincent A.J. O'Connor led to him getting a suspended sentence instead. Despite the leniency, he was still given a permanent banning from the NBA in relation to the point-shaving scandal, with Melchiorre being the second ever #1 pick in NBA history to never play a single game in the NBA behind Clifton McNeely from the inaugural 1947 BAA draft.
Aaron Preece	Tri-Cities Blackhawks	1951	1951–52	On July 24, 1951, only months after being selected as the 72nd pick of the 1951 NBA draft by the Tri-Cities Blackhawks (who would soon become the Milwaukee Hawks before the end of the year), Preece alongside four other Bradley University basketball players (current or former at the time) admitted to taking bribes from gamblers to hold down scores in multiple specific games of interest. He was later acquitted in the case alongside three other students from Bradley, but he was still permanently banned from the NBA due to his association with the point-shaving case.
Mike Chianakas	—	1951	1951–52	On August 27, 1951, an indictment was filed against Chianakas in relation to taking bribes from gamblers to holding down scores in multiple games of interest. Originally, Chianakas was looking at a three year sentence in prison by Judge Saul S. Streit after pleading guilty to a misdemeanor by accepting bribes from gamblers to hold down scores before praise from Assistant District Attorney Vincent A.J. O'Connor led to him getting a suspended sentence instead. Despite the leniency, he was still given a permanent banning from the NBA in relation to the point-shaving scandal.
Fred Schlictman	—	1951	1951–52	Sometime after August 27, 1951, Schlictman's name would be brought up as a player involved with the other Bradley University basketball players involved with the point-shaving scandal that was grouped in with CCNY by this time. However, no charges were ultimately filed against Schlictman and he was considered acquitted alongside three other Bradley teammates of his. Despite his apparently random inclusion in the case, Schlictman was still given a permanent banning from the NBA due to that association with the point-shaving scandal.
Dale Barnstable	Boston Celtics	1949; 1951	1951–52	On October 20, 1951, over a year after being drafted as the 73rd pick of the 1950 NBA draft by the Boston Celtics (though never officially playing for them), former University of Kentucky players Dale Barnstable, Ralph Beard, and Alex Groza were arrested after admitting they had shaved points while playing in college. Barnstable, Beard, and Groza would each receive suspended sentences, be placed on an indefinite probation period, and be barred from playing professional sports for three years in addition to receiving permanent bans from the NBA.
Ralph Beard	Indianapolis Olympians	1949; 1951	1951–52	In 1951, Beard and teammate Alex Groza were banned permanently from the NBA after they admitted that they had shaved points while playing in college. Beard and Groza also received suspended sentences, be placed on indefinite probation periods, and be barred from playing other professional sports for three years in addition to the ban.
Alex Groza	Indianapolis Olympians	1949; 1951	1951–52	In 1951, Groza and teammate Ralph Beard were banned permanently from the NBA after they admitted that they had shaved points while playing in college. Groza and Beard also received suspended sentences, be placed on indefinite probation periods, and be barred from playing other professional sports for three years in addition to the ban. Groza would later coach for the Kentucky Colonels and San Diego Conquistadors and become the general manager of the Conquistadors and director of player development for the San Diego Sails in the American Basketball Association, a future rival to the NBA, during the 1970s.
Walter Hirsch	—	1950; 1952	1951–52	On March 2, 1952, Hirsch, a University of Kentucky player, was permanently banned from both the NBA and minor league baseball from his role as first baseman there after Hirsch and former teammate Jim Line admitted to point shaving while in college and sought to implicate Bill Spivey as well, though Hirsch was never formally charged in the 1951 college basketball point-shaving scandal.
Jim Line	Indianapolis Olympians	1950; 1952	1951–52	On March 2, 1952, Line, a former University of Kentucky player and 45th pick of the 1950 NBA draft by the Indianapolis Olympians that never played with the Olympians at the time, was permanently banned from the NBA after Line and former college teammate Walter Hirsch admitted to point shaving while in college and sought to implicate Bill Spivey as well, though Line was ultimately acquitted in his case.
Bill Spivey	—	1951; 1952	1951–52	On March 2, 1952, Spivey, a University of Kentucky player, was barred from athletic play in college after previously giving up his eligibility to play for them earlier in the season due to a knee injury and surgery on December 24, 1951, despite not being directly implicated in the 1951 college basketball point-shaving scandal (though he was accused of being involved by his fellow Kentucky teammates). Not long after that, he was considered permanently banned from the NBA in relation to his supposed involvement in the CCNY point shaving scandal, with Kentucky subsequently being suspended for their 1952–53 season. His case against him originally resulted in perjury before it ultimately resulted in a mistrial and subsequently got dismissed afterward. While being banned from the NBA, the Cincinnati Royals were still interested in acquiring Spivey at the time due to the mistrial results. He then tried to sue the NBA for an unjust blacklisting with $800,000 in damages being sought after, but he would only get $10,000 in a settlement. On February 11, 1968, Spivey would take advantage of NBA loopholes to play in an unofficial game hosted by the Baltimore Bullets that involved players from both the original team from 1944–1954 and the EPBL, the latter of which Spivey played for at one point in time, which became the last basketball game he ever played.
Jack Molinas	Fort Wayne Pistons	1952; 1954	1953–54	On January 10, 1954, Molinas was banned permanently for betting on his own team while playing in college and the NBA, with there being claims that he was also involved in the 1951 college basketball point-shaving scandal during that period of time. Years later, Molinas became a key figure in the 1961 NCAA University Division men's basketball gambling scandal as a tamperer to other student-athletes and more college sports games, which banned more student athletes from play at the time than the 1951 college basketball point-shaving scandal.

=== Via the 1961 NCAA gambling scandal ===
By 1961, thanks in part to former player Jack Molinas, a greater scandal within the NCAA would lead to even more individuals from a mostly collegiate background (with some involving younger individuals at the time whose main crime in the event was just mainly meeting up with Molinas or one of his associates at the time) getting permanently banned from the NBA, including some players that would later get drafted into the NBA and a future Basketball Hall of Famer. One college football player that was involved in this scandal named William "Bill" Minnerly from the University of Connecticut was also expelled from college and barred from entering the NFL as well following the revelations of this scandal.

Name	Team(s)	Year(s)	Season(s)	Reason
Ed Bowler	—	1961	1961–62	After being named as one of the players involved with fixed NCAA games according to the testimony of the gamblers involved in the 1961 NCAA University Division men's basketball gambling scandal, Bowler, a La Salle University player, would be permanently banned from collegiate play and the NBA.
David "Dave" Budin	—	1961	1961–62	After previously going from a captain of the Brooklyn College men's basketball team to later joining a group of fixers and gamblers primarily led by Jack Molinas under the 1961 NCAA University Division men's basketball gambling scandal, Budin was given a permanent ban from the NBA and other similar leagues even though he was primarily a school teacher that was 27 years old when he got caught at the time. Budin would later receive a suspended sentence in New York for his involvement in the gambling scandal.
Michael "Mike" Callahan	—	1961	1961–62	After being one of the players indicted following the early 1960s arrest of Jack Molinas, Callahan, a former University of South Carolina player, was given a permanent banning from the NBA.
William "Bill" Chrystal	—	1957; 1961	1961–62	After being named as one of the first ever players involved with fixed NCAA games according to the testimony of the gamblers involved in the 1961 NCAA University Division men's basketball gambling scandal, Chrystal, a St. John's University player, was given a permanent ban from the NBA despite not playing basketball since 1957.
Glenn Cross	—	1961	1961–62	Following the arrests of pool shark Aaron Wagman and gambler Joey Hacken, Cross, a University of Connecticut player, was expelled from his university and given a permanent ban from the NBA alongside two of his teammates due to their involvement in the scandal.
Larry Dial	—	1961	1961–62	After being one of the players indicted following the early 1960s arrest of Jack Molinas, Dial, a former University of South Carolina player, was given a permanent banning from the NBA.
Jack Egan	Philadelphia Warriors	1961	1961–62	After being discovered as one of three players from St. Joseph's University to have shaved points for the team during the 1961 NCAA University Division men's basketball gambling scandal (which subsequently led to their third place finish being stripped away from the NCAA), Egan was permanently banned from the NBA for his involvement in the scandal after being drafted by the Philadelphia Warriors as the 29th pick in 1961.
Dick Falenski	—	1961	1961–62	Despite not taking up an offer made by local dental teacher Edward H. Sebastian, Falenski, a University of Pittsburgh player, would be permanently banned from the NBA due to him meeting up with Sebastian three different times regarding his offers.
Thomas Falentino	—	1961	1961–62	After being named as one of the players involved with fixed NCAA games according to the testimony of the gamblers involved in the 1961 NCAA University Division men's basketball gambling scandal, Falentino and his apparent Bowling Green State University teammate Billy Reed were given permanent bans from both collegiate play and the NBA.
Richard "Dick" Fisher	—	1961	1961–62	After being one of the players indicted following the early 1960s arrest of Jack Molinas, Fisher, a University of Tennessee player, was given a permanent banning from the NBA.
Robert "Bob" Frantz	—	1961	1961–62	After being one of the players indicted following the early 1960s arrest of Jack Molinas, Frantz, a former University of South Carolina player, was given a permanent banning from the NBA.
John Fridley	—	1961	1961–62	Despite not taking up an offer made by local dental teacher Edward H. Sebastian, Fridley, a University of Pittsburgh player, would be permanently banned from the NBA due to him meeting up with Sebastian twice regarding his offers.
Donald "Don" Gallagher	—	1961	1961–62	After being one of the players indicted following the early 1960s arrest of Jack Molinas, Gallagher, a North Carolina State University player, was given a permanent banning from the NBA.
Jerry Graves	Chicago Packers	1961	1961–62	After being drafted by the Chicago Packers expansion team in 1961 as the 19th pick, Graves was permanently banned from the NBA for his involvement in the 1961 NCAA University Division men's basketball gambling scandal due to him only "providing information" to gamblers and never shaving points for them, but accepting $4,750 in bribes from gamblers that bet on Mississippi State University games and paid him if he won.
Joe Green	—	1961	1961–62	After going from a former standout high school basketball player at William Howard Taft High School in New York City to one of the key pool sharks to fix and gamble on college games during the 1961 NCAA University Division men's basketball gambling scandal for his own purpose of rebelling against the college education system for professional basketball, Green was given a permanent ban from the NBA and other similar professional leagues despite never attending college due to his lack of credits to graduate high school properly. Green would later receive a six-to-seven year prison sentence as a part of a plea deal in New York alongside a three-to-five year suspended sentence in North Carolina due to his major involvement in the gambling scandal.
Hank Gunter	—	1961	1961–62	After being named as one of the players involved with fixed NCAA games according to the testimony of the gamblers involved in the 1961 NCAA University Division men's basketball gambling scandal, Gunter and his Seton Hall University teammate Hicks were both permanently banned from the NBA.
Arthur "Art" Hicks	—	1961	1961–62	After being named as one of the players involved with fixed NCAA games according to the testimony of the gamblers involved in the 1961 NCAA University Division men's basketball gambling scandal, Hicks and his Seton Hall University teammate Gunter were both permanently banned from the NBA.
Richard "Dick" Hoffman	—	1961	1961–62	After being one of the players indicted following the early 1960s arrest of Jack Molinas, Hoffman, a former University of South Carolina player, was given a permanent banning from the NBA.
Tony Jackson	New York Knicks	1961	1961–62	After being drafted by the New York Knicks as the 24th pick in 1961, Jackson was permanently banned from the NBA for his involvement in the 1961 NCAA University Division men's basketball gambling scandal due to his connection with Jack Molinas, despite Jackson claiming Molinas' offer to him was "a joke". Jackson later played in the rivaling American Basketball League (ABL) and American Basketball Association (ABA) during his banning.
Leonard Kaplan	—	1959; 1961	1961–62	After being one of the players indicted following the early 1960s arrest of Jack Molinas, Kaplan, a former University of Alabama player, was given a permanent banning from the despite him not playing basketball since completing college back in 1959.
Gary Kaufman	—	1961	1961–62	After being named as one of the players involved with fixed NCAA games according to the testimony of the gamblers involved in the 1961 NCAA University Division men's basketball gambling scandal, Kaufman, a College of the Pacific (University of the Pacific) player from Stockton, California, was given a permanent ban from the NBA.
Pete Kelly	—	1961	1961–62	Following the arrests of pool shark Aaron Wagman and gambler Joey Hacken, Kelly, a University of Connecticut player, was expelled from his university and given a permanent ban from the NBA alongside two of his teammates due to their involvement in the scandal.
Vincent "Vince" Kempton	New York Knicks	1961	1961–62	After being discovered as one of three players from St. Joseph's University to have shaved points for the team during the 1961 NCAA University Division men's basketball gambling scandal (which subsequently led to their third place finish being stripped away from the NCAA), Kempton was permanently banned from the NBA for his involvement in the scandal after being selected by the New York Knicks as the 107th and final pick in 1961.
Terry Litchfield	—	1961	1961–62	After being named as one of the players involved with fixed NCAA games according to the testimony of the gamblers involved in the 1961 NCAA University Division men's basketball gambling scandal, Litchfield alongside three of his teammates from North Carolina State University were all permanently banned from the NBA, with Litchfield also being permanently banned from collegiate play as well.
Frank Majewski	—	1961	1961–62	After being discovered as one of three players from St. Joseph's University to have shaved points for the team during the 1961 NCAA University Division men's basketball gambling scandal (which subsequently led to their third place finish being stripped away from the NCAA), Majewski was permanently banned from the NBA for his involvement in the scandal.
John Morgan	—	1960; 1961	1961–62	After taking on a fix with Charles North's friend, Mike Siegel, and attorney Charlie Tucker, Morgan was immediately expelled from the University of Detroit in December 1960. Following the revelation that it was in relation to the 1961 NCAA University Division men's basketball gambling scandal, Morgan was also permanently banned by the NBA as well.
Anton Muehlbauer	—	1961	1961–62	After being named as one of the players involved with fixed NCAA games according to the testimony of the gamblers involved in the 1961 NCAA University Division men's basketball gambling scandal, Muehlbauer alongside three of his teammates from North Carolina State University were all permanently banned from the NBA, with Muehlbauer also being permanently banned from collegiate play as well.
Stanley "Stan" Niewierowski	—	1961	1961–62	After being named as one of the players involved with fixed NCAA games according to the testimony of the gamblers involved in the 1961 NCAA University Division men's basketball gambling scandal, Niewierowski alongside three of his teammates from North Carolina State University were all permanently banned from the NBA.
Charles "Charlie" North	—	1960; 1961	1961–62	After agreeing with teammate John Morgan to fix a game with his own friend, Mike Siegel, and attorney Charlie Tucker, North was immediately expelled from the University of Detroit in December 1960. Following the revelation that it was in relation to the 1961 NCAA University Division men's basketball gambling scandal, North was also permanently banned by the NBA as well.
Ray Paprocky	—	1961	1961–62	After being named as one of the players involved with fixed NCAA games according to the testimony of the gamblers involved in the 1961 NCAA University Division men's basketball gambling scandal, Paprocky, a New York University player, was given a permanent ban from the NBA.
Mike Parenti	—	1957; 1961	1961–62	After being named as one of the first ever players involved with fixed NCAA games according to the testimony of the gamblers involved in the 1961 NCAA University Division men's basketball gambling scandal, Parenti, a St. John's University player, was given a permanent ban from the NBA despite not playing basketball since 1957.
Fred Portnoy	—	1961	1961–62	After being named as one of the players involved with fixed NCAA games according to the testimony of the gamblers involved in the 1961 NCAA University Division men's basketball gambling scandal, Portnoy, a Columbia University player, was given a permanent ban from both collegiate play and the NBA.
Dan Quindazzi	—	1959; 1961	1961–62	Despite not playing the sport of basketball since graduating from the University of Alabama in 1959, Quindazzi was given a permanent ban from the NBA following the revelation that he had acted as a go-between guy in at least one fix alongside former teammate Jerry Vogel and University of Connecticut football player William Minnerly. Both Quindazzi and Jerry Vogel were later given suspended sentences and lengthy probation periods in New York due to their involvement as recruiter-players.
Billy "Bill" Reed	—	1961	1961–62	After being named as one of the players involved with fixed NCAA games according to the testimony of the gamblers involved in the 1961 NCAA University Division men's basketball gambling scandal (specifically as the sole collegiate player that was directly bribed by Jack Molinas himself), Reed and his apparent Bowling Green State University teammate Thomas Falentino were given permanent bans from both collegiate play and the NBA.
Tim Robinson	—	1961	1961–62	After being named as one of the players to have been involved with fixed money from gamblers in relation to the 1961 NCAA University Division men's basketball gambling scandal, Robinson and his Bradley University teammate Alphra Saunders were given permanent bans from the NBA.
Jack Rose	—	1961	1961–62	Following the arrests of pool shark Aaron Wagman and gambler Joey Hacken, Rose, a University of Connecticut player, was given a permanent ban from the NBA alongside two of his teammates due to their involvement in the scandal.
Alphra Saunders	—	1961	1961–62	After being named as one of the players to have been involved with fixed money from gamblers in relation to the 1961 NCAA University Division men's basketball gambling scandal, Saunders and his Bradley University teammate Tim Robinson were given permanent bans from the NBA.
Phil Silber	—	1960; 1961	1961–62	After the University of Florida student was caught and arrested in Gainesville, Florida alongside pool shark Aaron Wagman via trying to bribe Florida fullback Jon MacBeth in a game against the in-state rival Florida State on September 24, 1960, Silber was considered permanently banned from both the NFL and the NBA following the revelation that Silber's case was related to the 1961 NCAA University Division men's basketball gambling scandal.
Edward "Eddie" Test	—	1961	1961–62	After being one of the players indicted following the early 1960s arrest of Jack Molinas, Test, a University of Tennessee player, was given a permanent banning from the NBA.
Salvatore "Sal" Vergopia	—	1961	1961–62	After being one of the players indicted following the early 1960s arrest of Jack Molinas, Vergopia, a Niagara University player, was given a permanent banning from the NBA.
Jerry Vogel	—	1959; 1961	1961–62	Despite not playing the sport of basketball since graduating from the University of Alabama in 1959, Vogel was given a permanent ban from the NBA following the revelation that he had acted as a go-between guy in at least one fix alongside former teammate Dan Quindazzi and University of Connecticut football player William Minnerly. Both Vogel and Dan Quindazzi were later given suspended sentences and lengthy probation periods in New York due to their involvement as recruiter-players.
Leonard "Len" Whelan	—	1961	1961–62	After being one of the players indicted following the early 1960s arrest of Jack Molinas, Whelan, a Niagara University player, was given a permanent banning from the NBA.
Leroy Wright	Boston Celtics	1961	1961–62	After being drafted by the Boston Celtics as the 16th pick of the 1960 NBA draft, Wright, a former College of the Pacific (now University of the Pacific) player, was given a permanent banning from the NBA following Jack Molinas' arrest in the early 1960s and Wright's subsequent indictment in relation to Molinas' arrest. Wright would never have the chance to play in the NBA despite being drafted early during that period of time.
Charlie Williams	—	1965	1965–66	Williams was banned permanently from the NBA after graduating from Seattle University in 1965 due to alleged involvement with gambler Jack Molinas in the 1961 NCAA University Division men's basketball gambling scandal. This announcement of his alleged involvement would occur years after the initial scandal concluded, with Williams having already played for Seattle's college basketball teams for the already allotted time he was allowed to do so. He would later play for the rivaling American Basketball Association (ABA) due to commissioner George Mikan forgiving him and other star players that were said to have been involved in the gambling scandal at the time, with Williams playing in the league from 1967 until 1973 under a technically true six different team names involved there, including the debut champions of the league in the Pittsburgh Pipers.
Roger Brown	—	1966	1966–67	Brown was banned permanently from the NCAA and the University of Dayton for his association with gambler Jack Molinas in 1960 before being permanently banned by the NBA for that same reason in 1966, but went on to play in the rivaling American Basketball Association (ABA) following that league's inception in 1967. On February 15, 2013, Brown was announced as one of five direct inductees to join the Naismith Hall of Fame, having been elected by the Hall's ABA Committee, later being inducted in September 2013. His number is one of currently four players' numbers retired by the Indiana Pacers. He also was an assistant coach for the Pacers during the 1979–80 NBA season after retiring from playing professional basketball in 1975.

=== After the major NCAA scandals ===
While the NBA has resorted to less permanent bans following the two major NCAA scandals of 1951 and 1961, the league has still resorted to using them as a dramatic last resort even to this present day, primarily with the use of hard drugs entering the 1980s decade. While some players that might have been permanently banned during that time were able to get out via appeal or even waiting until a later date, others were still stuck on the permanent ban list even after being freed from it.

Name	Team(s)	Year(s)	Season(s)	Reason
Ernie Cobb	Utah Jazz; New Jersey Nets	1978; 1979; 1981	1980–81	After previously being selected by the Utah Jazz as the 109th pick of the 1979 NBA draft and at one point trying out for the New Jersey Nets during training camp, Cobb would be permanently banned from the NBA alongside former Boston College teammates Rick Kuhn and Jim Sweeney on February 16, 1981 due to his participation in the 1978–79 Boston College basketball point-shaving scandal. This would be the last known case where college basketball players who were involved with point-shaving in college would be permanently banned from the NBA before having a chance to play in the league.
Rick Kuhn	—	1978; 1979; 1981	1980–81	On February 16, 1981, Kuhn alongside former Boston College teammates Ernie Cobb and Jim Sweeney would be permanently banned from the NBA due to his participation in the 1978–79 Boston College basketball point-shaving scandal. This would be the last known case where college basketball players who were involved with point-shaving in college would be permanently banned from the NBA before having a chance to play in the league. Kuhn was later sentenced to 10 years in prison for his role in the scandal, though his sentence was later reduced to 28 months in prison instead due to him later testifying in court.
Jim Sweeney	—	1978; 1979; 1981	1980–81	On February 16, 1981, Sweeney alongside former Boston College teammates Ernie Cobb and Rick Kuhn would be permanently banned from the NBA due to his participation in the 1978–79 Boston College basketball point-shaving scandal. This would be the last known case where college basketball players who were involved with point-shaving in college would be permanently banned from the NBA before having a chance to play in the league.
John Drew	Atlanta Hawks; Utah Jazz	1986	1985–86	In January 1986, Drew was banned permanently for repeatedly violating the NBA's substance abuse policy, becoming the first player to truly be permanently banned from the NBA due to violating the NBA's substance abuse policies despite him playing for the Wyoming Wildcatters of the Continental Basketball Association at the time his ban happened. The Washington Bullets had expressed interest in signing Drew during the month of December 1985, but were prohibited from signing him before his banning due to his previous incidents with each team before them.
Eddie Johnson	Seattle SuperSonics	1987	1987–88	On December 6, 1987, Eddie Lee Johnson was banned permanently after failing to follow through mandatory drug counseling in an attempt to kick his cocaine addiction that he had throughout his playing career.
Chris Washburn	Golden State Warriors; Atlanta Hawks	1989	1989–90	On June 29, 1989, Washburn was banned permanently after three different positive drug tests while playing for two different teams throughout his career.
Roy Tarpley	Dallas Mavericks	1991; 1995	1991–92; 1995–96	In October 1991, Tarpley was initially banned permanently for repeatedly violating the NBA's substance abuse policy. He was reinstated three years later in 1994, but was permanently banned from the league again in December 1995 for using alcohol during his return to the NBA.
Richard Dumas	Phoenix Suns; Philadelphia 76ers	1991; 1993; 1996	1991–92; 1993–94; 1995–96	In 1991, Dumas was briefly suspended for a season as a drafted rookie for violating the NBA's substance abuse policy. In 1993, he was suspended indefinitely after finishing his official rookie season when he tested positive for a banned substance and then failed to participate in a drug rehabilitation program. After two years and later being traded to Philadelphia, he was reinstated and then subsequently banned in 1996 for violating a clause in his contract which prohibited him from consuming alcohol.
Donald Sterling	Los Angeles Clippers	2013; 2014	2013–14	In September 2013, Sterling was recorded making racist remarks privately to V. Stiviano (born María Vanessa Perez; also known as Monica Gallegos, Vanessa Perez, and Maria Valdez), his mistress girlfriend at the time. The remarks stemmed from her posting a picture of herself on Instagram with Magic Johnson. He said, "Don’t put him on an Instagram for the world to have to see so they have to call me. And don’t bring him to my games. Yeah, it bothers me a lot that you want to promo, broadcast that you’re associating with black people. Do you have to?", and, "You can sleep with [black people]. You can bring them in, you can do whatever you want", but "the little I ask you is ... not to bring them to my games". On April 25, 2014, during that season's playoffs, TMZ leaked an audio recording of the conversation. After protests involving multiple Clippers players occurred, on April 29, 2014, Commissioner Adam Silver banned the Clippers owner for life, as well as fined him. Silver also began the procedure of forcing Sterling out of the league, eventually replacing his position with then-Microsoft CEO Steve Ballmer buying the team for around a then-record high $2 billion after it was discovered that Donald was in the early stages of Alzheimer's disease, which allowed his wife, Shelly, to be his financial trustee going forward in order for the sale to happen for Ballmer. Events from this series would later be showcased in the 2024 FX on Hulu miniseries called Clipped.
O. J. Mayo	Milwaukee Bucks	2016	2016–17	On July 1, 2016, Mayo was banned from playing in the NBA for violating the league's substance abuse policy by smoking marijuana and abusing painkillers. He was eligible to apply for reinstatement in 2018, but never returned to the NBA. His original suspension for violating the substance abuse policy is considered to be the longest suspension in NBA history at 164 games in length (excluding 13 playoff games the Bucks played during that period in time, which would count toward the overall total of 177 games missed during that time) by some media outlets due to it covering two straight seasons at once, though he never returned to the NBA in order for it to even be considered a proper suspension in this case. In 2024, Mayo would retire from play to be an assistant coach for the Liaoning Flying Leopards' C team out in China.
Jontay Porter	Toronto Raptors	2024	2023–24	On March 25, 2024, Porter was placed on a team leave for "personal reasons" after it was reported the NBA opened investigations on him for "multiple instances of betting irregularities" between the months of January and March of that year. On April 17, 2024, Porter was banned by the NBA for violating the league's gambling policies, with bets relating on his own statistics and health to even betting against his own team at times. He became the first player in NBA history to be permanently banned from the NBA while also being on a two-way contract at the time since he was a member of the Raptors 905 during that period as well, meaning Porter was also permanently banned from the NBA G League, the official development league of the NBA, as well. Porter later pled guilty to his involvement in the act in a federal case in the U.S.A. and is also being tried in Canada as well due to the team he played for. The NBA would also implement the Jontay Porter Rule following his ban, forbidding sportsbooks to include player props for players that are on two-way contracts or 10-day contracts.

== Banned but later reinstated ==
Most cases where a player has been banned from the NBA but later reinstated are a result of the league's anti-drug policy, which was started back in 1983 after a rise in drugs like cocaine and methamphetamine had occurred. The policy, developed jointly between the NBA and the players' association, made a third illegal drug use offense punishable by a ban, although a player could apply for reinstatement after a minimum of two years (or in the case of Jalen Harris, only one year).

Name	Team	Year	Season	Reason
Connie Hawkins	—	1966	—	During his freshman year in college, Hawkins was linked to a point shaving scandal. As a result of this connection, he was informally banned from the NBA in 1961, and formally banned in 1966. Hawkins filed an anti-trust lawsuit against the NBA, claiming that he was unfairly banned from participation when there was no substantial evidence linking him to the scandal. In 1969, the NBA settled the suit with Hawkins, paying him a cash settlement and lifting his ban to play with the Phoenix Suns. Despite being unable to play in the NBA when he was in his prime, Hawkins' performance with the Suns gave him the honor of being the first player in franchise history to have his jersey number retired in what is now known as the Phoenix Suns Ring of Honor, with his performances throughout the ABL, ABA and NBA later helping him get inducted into the Naismith Memorial Basketball Hall of Fame in 1992.
Micheal Ray Richardson	New Jersey Nets	1986	1985–86	In February 1986, Richardson was banned permanently after violating the NBA's substance abuse policy for a third time. He was the first active NBA player to be banned by the league. He was reinstated two years later in July 1988, although he never played in the NBA again on his own accord.
Mitchell Wiggins	Houston Rockets	1987	1986–87	On January 13, 1987, Wiggins and Lloyd were banned permanently after testing positive for cocaine, a banned substance. Wiggins was reinstated on July 28, 1989, while Lloyd was reinstated on September 8, 1989.
Lewis Lloyd	Houston Rockets	1987	1986–87	On January 13, 1987, Wiggins and Lloyd were banned permanently after testing positive for cocaine, a banned substance. Wiggins was reinstated on July 28, 1989, while Lloyd was reinstated on September 8, 1989.
Duane Washington	New Jersey Nets	1988	1988–89	In October 1988, Washington was banned permanently after testing positive for cocaine, a banned substance. He was later reinstated, and played briefly for the Clippers in the 1992–93 season.
Stanley Roberts	Philadelphia 76ers	1999	1999–00	On November 25, 1999, Roberts was banned permanently after testing positive for a banned substance. He was reinstated three seasons later, and had a brief stint with the Toronto Raptors in 2003.
Chris Andersen	New Orleans/Oklahoma City Hornets	2006	2005–06	On January 25, 2006, Andersen was banned permanently for violating the NBA's substance abuse policy. He subsequently filed a grievance against the NBA, but an arbitrator denied his request in March 2006. He was reinstated two years later with the New Orleans Hornets on March 4, 2008.
Tyreke Evans	Indiana Pacers	2019	2018–19	On May 17, 2019, Evans was banned for violating the league's anti-drug policy regarding a drug of abuse. He was eligible to apply for reinstatement after two seasons passed in 2021, and he was officially reinstated on February 14, 2022.
Jalen Harris	Toronto Raptors	2021	2021–22	On July 1, 2021, Harris was banned for violating the league's anti-drug policy. He was eligible to apply for reinstatement during 2022, and he was officially reinstated on September 25, 2022.

== Suspended ==
Only suspensions lasting six games or more from individuals involved with NBA teams are included.

=== 51 or more games ===
Length	Name	Team(s)	Year(s)	Season(s)	Reason
93 games (1 year) (82 regular season games and 11 playoff games) (Entire 2022–23 season)	Robert Sarver	Phoenix Suns	2022	2022–23	On September 13, 2022, the NBA suspended Sarver for the entire 2022–23 season (and the entire 2023 WNBA season), fining him the maximum salary of $10 million. An independent investigation on him and the team that lasted nearly the full 2021–22 season found that he not only used the word "nigger" at least five times (with four such instances resulting in subordinates telling Sarver afterward that he should not use that word), but that he also was involved in conduct that included "unequal treatment of female employees; sex-related statements and conduct; and harsh treatment of employees that on occasion constituted bullying." During the rest of the 2022–23 season until the day new ownership took over Sarver's position, any actions requiring him normally were instead performed by Suns vice chairman and minority owner Sam Garvin. After various personnel relating to the Suns and the NBA thought that Sarver's punishment was too lenient for his actions, Sarver announced he would begin the process of selling both the Suns and the Phoenix Mercury on September 21. Sarver eventually accepted a deal with United Wholesale Mortgage's CEO Mat Ishbia and his brother Justin to purchase the Suns and Mercury for the asking price of $4 billion on December 20, 2022, with the NBA approving the new ownership group taking over Sarver's majority stake on February 6, 2023, being 55 games played at the time out of 82 games total, plus potential playoff and/or play-in tournament action, into Sarver's suspension by that period of time. However, despite no longer owning either basketball team, Sarver's suspensions from both the NBA & WNBA were still considered active until September 13, 2023. In terms of games played, the Suns competed in 93 total games between a full 82 game regular season and 11 playoff games that season.
87 games (81 regular season games, 1 NBA play-in tournament game, and 5 playoff games); Rest of the 2025–26 season)	Chauncey Billups	Portland Trail Blazers	2025	2025–26	On October 23, 2025, following the Portland Trail Blazers' opening game loss against the Minnesota Timberwolves, head coach Chauncey Billups would be placed under arrest in relation to his involvement in the 2025 NBA illegal gambling prosecution. In effect, he would be suspended by the team for the rest of the season, as Billups would be placed under team leave while assistant head coach Tiago Splitter took on the duties of the interim head coach role for the rest of the season following this sudden situation. Splitter would later lead the team to the 2026 NBA play-in tournament and five games in the 2026 NBA playoffs for a grand total of 87 out of 88 games missed by Billups during this season.
86 games (73 regular season games and 13 playoff games) (Rest of the 2004–05 season)	Ron Artest	Indiana Pacers	2004	2004–05	On November 19, 2004, Artest entered the stands and grabbed a fan after a drink was thrown at him during an NBA game against the Detroit Pistons, causing a large brawl between players and fans. After Artest left the stands, he punched another fan that came onto the court to confront him.
82 games (1 year) (Entire 2026–27 season)	Steve Ballmer	Los Angeles Clippers	2026	2026–27	On September 2025, an episode of Pablo Torre Finds Out by Pulitzer Prize-winning investigative sports journalist Pablo Torre revealed that Steve Ballmer and the Los Angeles Clippers had circumvented the NBA salary cap to compensate star forward Kawhi Leonard through the since-bankrupt Aspiration company while trying to remain competitive at the time. Following a year-long investigation by commissioner Adam Silver and the NBA, the league would, in addition to a list of other serious punishments against the Clippers organization, suspend Clippers team owner Steve Ballmer from all league and team activities for an entire season for his actions in relation to this investigation. According to the NBA, Ballmer "knowingly" sought to help Leonard obtain off-court income opportunities, approved a business deal he knew was a precondition for Aspiration to enter into its endorsement agreement with Leonard, and failed to "create conditions under which his organization abided by the NBA’s circumvention rules." In terms of games played, it'll be a full 82 games lost this season (barring any setbacks similar to the 2019–20 NBA season suspension), with any potential NBA Cup championship games, play-in tournament games, or playoff games being added later on for good measure.
82 games (1 year) (Entire 2026–27 season)	Gillian Zucker	Los Angeles Clippers	2026	2026–27	On September 2, 2026, in relation to previous punishments regarding the salary cap circumvention case with star forward Kawhi Leonard, including the aforementioned one on team owner Steve Ballmer, the NBA suspended Los Angeles Clippers co-president of basketball operations Gillian Zucker for the entire 2026–27 season without pay due to her being "primarily and directly culpable for the impermissible endorsement arrangements" alongside providing "false and misleading statements to investigators." In terms of games played, it'll be a full 82 games lost this season (barring any setbacks similar to the 2019–20 NBA season suspension), with any potential NBA Cup championship games, play-in tournament games, or playoff games being added later on for good measure. Zucker would end up being the first female to ever be suspended by the NBA in relation to this scandal.
68 games (originally set to be 10 and then 82 games) (Rest of the 1997–98 season)	Latrell Sprewell	Golden State Warriors	1997	1997–98	On December 1, 1997, Sprewell threatened, choked, and punched Warriors head coach P. J. Carlesimo during team practice after Carlesimo criticized his passing. He was immediately suspended ten games; however, the Warriors terminated Sprewell's $23.7 million contract two days later, and he was subsequently suspended for a year. Upon appeal, his original contract termination was overturned and his 82-game suspension was reduced to 68 games.
65 games (1 year) (Entire 2019–20 season)	Mark Stevens	Golden State Warriors	2019	2019–20	On June 6, 2019, Stevens, a minority owner of the Golden State Warriors, pushed Toronto Raptors guard Kyle Lowry during Game 3 of the 2019 NBA Finals. He was later barred by the Warriors from attending the rest of that year's NBA Finals in both Oakland and Toronto before being suspended for one year from all NBA games and arenas, as well as fined half-a-million dollars ($500,000) for the incident. His suspension unofficially ended prematurely on March 11, 2020, when the NBA's season was temporarily suspended as a result of the COVID-19 pandemic starting to affect some of the league's players. The official end to his suspension came when the Warriors were not invited to play in the 2020 NBA Bubble during the July and August 2020 period due to them having the worst record of the season by March 11, 2020 at 15–50, officially finishing 65 of their originally scheduled 82 regular season games that season. Stevens ultimately returned to help with the team's duties and watch their games inside NBA arenas again by December 2020 for the start of their 2020–21 season.
60 games (six months)	Lawrence Frank	Los Angeles Clippers	2026	2026–27	On September 2, 2026, in relation to previous punishments regarding the salary cap circumvention case with star forward Kawhi Leonard, including season-long punishments toward team owner Steve Ballmer and Gillian Zucker, the NBA suspended Los Angeles Clippers co-president of basketball operations Lawrence Frank for six months without pay due to "his involvement with the impermissible endorsement arrangements and for approving impermissible expenses incurred by Leonard and his family." He is currently slated to be back by March 2, 2027, with that date also being the Clippers' 61st game of the season by that point in time against the Portland Trail Blazers.
59 games (Originally the entire 2022–23 season)	Ime Udoka	Boston Celtics	2022	2022–23	On September 22, 2022, the Boston Celtics organization suspended Udoka, their head coach, for the entire 2022–23 season for violations of team policies pertaining to an improper intimate relationship with a female Celtics staff member. While the relationship was originally believed by the organization to be consensual, the woman later accused Udoka of making unwanted comments towards her. Udoka chose not to resign from his position as a result of the violation, though Adrian Wojnarowski reported that Udoka was not guaranteed to stay with the organization following the 2022–23 season, to the point that he was considered free to coach for any other NBA team later on in that season if the opportunity presented itself for him to do so. Assistant coach Joe Mazzulla took his place as the interim head coach throughout the season, including coaching Team Giannis for the 2023 NBA All-Star Game, until the Celtics made the announcements of firing Ime Udoka and hiring Joe Mazzulla as the official head coach of the Boston Celtics on February 16, 2023. By that point in time, the Celtics played 59 games out of 82 total, as well as had a 42–17 record before entering the All-Star Weekend at the time of the announcement. Udoka was later hired as the head coach of the Houston Rockets on April 25, 2023, while the Celtics were competing in the 2023 NBA playoffs at the time.

=== 21 to 50 games ===
Length	Name	Team(s)	Year(s)	Season(s)	Reason
50 games (Rest of the 2009–10 season)	Gilbert Arenas	Washington Wizards	2010	2009–10	On January 27, 2010, Arenas was suspended for violating NBA rules and Washington, D.C. firearm laws by storing an unloaded firearm in his locker and drawing it on teammate Javaris Crittenton during an argument regarding gambling debts in December 2009. Arenas was already on an indefinite suspension since January 6 while under investigation for carrying and storing unlicensed firearms.
38 games (Rest of the 2009–10 season)	Javaris Crittenton	Washington Wizards	2010	2009–10	On January 27, 2010, Crittenton was suspended for violating NBA rules and Washington, D.C. laws by storing an unloaded firearm in his locker and drawing it on teammate Gilbert Arenas during an argument regarding gambling debts in December 2009. He did not play a single game with the Wizards that season before his suspension and was waived from the team after that season. He also never played another NBA game again afterward, with Crittenton eventually being sentenced to 23 years in prison for manslaughter and assault in 2011, though serving only 10 years in prison from 2013 to 2023 due to a district attorney agreement.
30 games	Stephen Jackson	Indiana Pacers	2004	2004–05	On November 19, 2004, Jackson entered the stands and punched a fan after a drink was thrown at teammate Ron Artest during an NBA game against the Detroit Pistons.
30 games	Miles Bridges	Charlotte Hornets	2023	2022–23; 2023–24	On April 14, 2023, Bridges was suspended after pleading no contest to a felony domestic violence charge against the mother of his children, which occurred in June 2022 while he was a free agent, being considered a restricted free agent with the Charlotte Hornets at the time. Following his arrest and plea, Bridges did not sign an NBA contract for the 2022–23 season, missing all 82 games that season. In recognition of that outcome, the NBA deemed 20 games of the suspension were already served during that time. With Bridges signing a new one season deal with the Hornets for the 2023–24 season, he was required to miss the first 10 games of that season before returning with the Hornets properly on November 17, 2023.
26 games	Kermit Washington	Los Angeles Lakers	1977	1977–78	On December 9, 1977, Washington punched Houston Rockets player Rudy Tomjanovich in the face during a fight in an NBA game. Tomjanovich was seriously injured and missed the rest of the season, but later made a full recovery.
25 games	Jodie Meeks	Washington Wizards	2018	2017–18; 2018–19	On April 4, 2018, Meeks was suspended after testing positive for Ipamorelin and GHRP-2. Meeks missed all of the playoffs and the start of the 2018–19 season.
25 games	Wilson Chandler	Brooklyn Nets	2019	2019–20	On August 29, 2019, Chandler was suspended by the NBA for 25 games for use of performance-enhancing drugs (PED).
25 games	Deandre Ayton	Phoenix Suns	2019	2019–20	On October 24, 2019, Ayton was suspended for 25 games after testing positive for a diuretic.
25 games	John Collins	Atlanta Hawks	2019	2019–20	On November 5, 2019, Collins was suspended for 25 games after testing positive for pralmorelin.
25 games	Didi Louzada	New Orleans Pelicans	2021	2021–22	On November 19, 2021, Louzada was suspended for 25 games after testing positive for drostanolone and testosterone.
25 games	Ja Morant	Memphis Grizzlies	2023	2023–24	On June 16, 2023, Morant was suspended after a series of incidents where he was seen flashing a gun, including another live instance of him holding a gun on Instagram Live video earlier in May. His suspension also required he fulfilled a league-wide sponsored program to help address his wrongdoings before returning to play.
25 games	Tristan Thompson	Cleveland Cavaliers	2024	2023–24	On January 23, 2024 Thompson was suspended without pay after testing positive for ibutamoren and SARM LGD-4033.
25 games	Bobby Portis	Milwaukee Bucks	2025	2024–25	On February 20, 2025, Portis was suspended without pay after testing positive for Tramadol.
25 games	Paul George	Philadelphia 76ers	2026	2025–26	On January 31, 2026, George was suspended without pay for an unspecified violation of the league's anti-drug policy for "improper medication".
24 games	Jeffery Taylor	Charlotte Hornets	2014	2014–15	On November 29, 2014, Taylor was suspended after pleading guilty to one count of domestic assault and malicious destruction of property.

=== 11 to 20 games ===
Length	Name	Team(s)	Year(s)	Season(s)	Reason
20 games	Hedo Türkoğlu	Orlando Magic	2013	2012–13	On February 13, 2013, Türkoğlu was suspended after testing positive for methenolone, a banned substance.
20 games	Joakim Noah	New York Knicks	2017	2016–17; 2017–18	On March 24, 2017, Noah was suspended after testing positive for ligandrol, a banned substance. Noah was suspended for the last 10 games of the Knicks' 2016–17 regular season, as well as the first 10 games of the 2017–18 season.
16 games (originally an indefinite period of time)	Draymond Green	Golden State Warriors	2023; 2024	2023–24	On December 12, 2023, during a game between the Warriors and the Phoenix Suns, Green struck Jusuf Nurkić in the face while being guarded by him. Green was subsequently assessed with a type 2 flagrant foul and was ejected from the game. The next day, the NBA announced his indefinite suspension. Green was previously suspended for five games as a result of an altercation between the Warriors and the Minnesota Timberwolves (wherein Green “forcibly grabbed” Rudy Gobert’s neck). He was reinstated to the team 12 games into the season in January 2024, but he did not play until January 15, 2024 against the Memphis Grizzlies, which concluded his indefinite suspension period at 16 straight games. Green later revealed in an episode of The Draymond Green Show that he had considered retirement during the suspension, only to then be talked out of it by commissioner Adam Silver.
15 games (originally set to be 25 games)	Jermaine O'Neal	Indiana Pacers	2004	2004–05	On November 19, 2004, O'Neal punched a fan who came onto the court to confront teammate Ron Artest during an NBA game against the Detroit Pistons. Upon appeal, his original 25-game suspension was reduced to 15 games.
15 games	Carmelo Anthony	Denver Nuggets	2006	2006–07	On December 16, 2006, Anthony punched New York Knicks player Mardy Collins in the face during a brawl in an NBA game.
15 games (originally set to be 5 games)	Mitch McGary	Oklahoma City Thunder	2016	2016–17	On July 8, 2016, McGary was suspended for five games for violating the NBA's drug policy. However, on September 13 that same year, McGary was suspended an additional 10 games for non-compliance with the league's drug policy, thus bringing the number of regular season games he was suspended for to 15. On October 24, McGary was waived by the Thunder before the season started. If McGary signs up with an NBA team again, he will still serve his suspension in the regular season before returning to play.
12 games	Malik Beasley	Minnesota Timberwolves	2021	2020–21	On February 25, 2021, Beasley was suspended for 12 games for his arrest on September 27, 2020 for possession of marijuana and concealing stolen property.
11 games	Dennis Rodman	Chicago Bulls	1997	1996–97	On January 15, 1997, Rodman kicked a courtside cameraman in the groin after tripping over him during an NBA game against the Minnesota Timberwolves. Though he was not assessed a technical foul at the time, he was suspended two days later.

=== 6 to 10 games ===
Length	Name	Team(s)	Year(s)	Season(s)	Reason
10 games	Vernon Maxwell	Houston Rockets	1995	1994–95	On February 6, 1995, Maxwell entered the stands and punched a fan who he claimed was heckling him during an NBA game against the Portland Trail Blazers.
10 games	J. R. Smith	Denver Nuggets	2006	2006–07	On December 16, 2006, Smith fought with New York Knicks player Nate Robinson during a brawl in an NBA game.
10 games	Nate Robinson	New York Knicks	2006	2006–07	On December 16, 2006, Robinson fought with Denver Nuggets player J. R. Smith during a brawl in an NBA game.
10 games	Lindsey Hunter	Detroit Pistons	2007	2006–07	On March 7, 2007, Hunter was suspended after testing positive for phentermine, a banned substance.
10 games	Darius Miles	Boston Celtics	2008	2008–09	On September 20, 2008, Miles was suspended after testing positive for phentermine, a banned substance.
10 games	Rashard Lewis	Orlando Magic	2009	2009–10	On August 6, 2009, Lewis was suspended after testing positive for dehydroepiandrosterone, a banned substance.
10 games	Delonte West	Boston Celtics	2010	2010–11	On August 20, 2010, West was suspended after pleading guilty to weapon charges from September 2009.
10 games	O. J. Mayo	Memphis Grizzlies	2011	2010–11	On January 27, 2011, Mayo was suspended after testing positive for dehydroepiandrosterone, a banned substance.
10 games	Larry Sanders	Milwaukee Bucks	2015	2014–15	On January 16, 2015, Sanders was suspended after testing positive for marijuana, a banned substance, for the second time. After Sanders' suspension ended, the Bucks bought him out before he played another game.
10 games	Dion Waiters	Miami Heat	2019	2019–20	On November 8, 2019, Waiters missed a game against the Los Angeles Lakers due to a panic attack he experienced while flying to the game. His panic attack stemmed from over-consumption of THC-infused edibles. Two days later, the Heat suspended Waiters for 10 games, including the previous game he missed, for the consumed edible.
8 games	Chris Webber	Sacramento Kings	2004	2003–04	On February 17, 2004, Webber was suspended five games for violating the NBA's drug policy and suspended three games for pleading guilty to lying to a grand jury about making an illegal loan when he was a college basketball player for University of Michigan. He served both suspensions together.
8 games	Darren Collison	Sacramento Kings	2016	2016–17	On October 2, 2016, Collison was suspended after pleading guilty to a misdemeanor domestic battery charge against his wife in May.
8 games	Bobby Portis	Chicago Bulls	2017	2017–18	On October 17, 2017, Portis punched teammate Nikola Mirotić in the face during an altercation in team practice. Mirotić suffered a concussion and facial fractures, which left him out until December 8, 2017. A day after the incident, Portis was suspended for the first eight games of the 2017–18 season.
8 games (Rest of the 2019–20 season)	Malik Monk	Charlotte Hornets	2020	2019–20	On February 26, 2020, Monk was suspended on an indefinite basis for violating the NBA's Anti-Drug Program. The suspension could have lasted for the entire, initial regular season in April, but the 2019–20 season was suspended by the end of March 11 due to the COVID-19 pandemic. While Monk was reinstated to play on June 8, the Hornets failed to qualify for the 2020 NBA Bubble at the ESPN Wide World of Sports Complex to resume their season due to them being the last team left out for qualification in the Eastern Conference, leaving Monk with an 8-game suspension officially. Had the suspension period lasted as long as it did without the pandemic coming about, Monk would have missed a grand total of 25 games (excluding the outside possibility of reaching the playoffs that season) during that time instead of just 8 total games played, as 17 planned games were officially cancelled as a result of the pandemic.
8 games (originally set to be 5 games and then indefinite)	Kyrie Irving	Brooklyn Nets	2022	2022–23	On October 27, 2022, Irving tweeted out a listing on Amazon for a 2018 film called Hebrews to Negroes: Wake Up Black America as a means to try and promote the Black Hebrew Israelite ideology. However, his tweet mainly encouraged fans to watch a film that included Holocaust denial, quotes from Adolf Hitler (albeit allegedly fake quotes) and Henry Ford's The International Jew, claims that Jewish people worship Satan, and accusations that the Jewish people controlled the Atlantic slave trade and other antisemitic tropes. After the NBA and the Brooklyn Nets expressed their disappointment toward Irving for his action, he continued defending his actions for promoting the film multiple times days later. On November 3, Irving was initially suspended for at least five games, which later became an indefinite amount of time, due to his failure to "unequivocally say he has no antisemitic beliefs" and for being unfit to be associated with the Brooklyn Nets organization at that point in time. During his suspension, Irving had a set list of requirements that he had to do in order to prove that he can return to play in the NBA again, including talks with the team, commissioner Adam Silver, and other prominent Jewish leaders, including rabbis in Brooklyn. After missing eight straight games due to the suspension, Irving was allowed to play for the Nets again on November 20.
8 games (originally absent from team for 2 and then 6 games)	Ja Morant	Memphis Grizzlies	2023	2022–23	On March 4, 2023, the NBA launched an investigation into an Instagram Live video of Morant displaying a gun at a Colorado nightclub earlier that morning. Morant later announced he would be away from the team the next two games after that video came out, with coach Taylor Jenkins confirming no timetable was announced for Morant's return the following day. The Grizzlies later announced that Morant would be out for the next four games as well. On March 15, the NBA announced that they had suspended him for eight games without pay for the incident, though his suspension already covered the previous six games Morant was away from the team. Despite later meeting the amount of time out through his suspension on March 18, 2023, Morant did not play with Memphis for a ninth straight game two days later on March 20 before he ultimately played again on March 22, which unofficially made his suspension period nine games long instead.
7 games	Nick Van Exel	Los Angeles Lakers	1996	1995–96	On April 10, 1996, Van Exel shoved referee Ron Garretson onto the scorer's table after Garretson ejected him for arguing a call during an NBA game against the Denver Nuggets.
7 games	Rasheed Wallace	Portland Trail Blazers	2003	2002–03	On January 15, 2003, Wallace confronted and threatened referee Tim Donaghy in the parking lot outside of the Rose Garden after Donaghy had given him a technical foul earlier during an NBA game against the Memphis Grizzlies.
7 games	Ron Artest	Sacramento Kings	2007	2007–08	On July 15, 2007, Artest was suspended after pleading no contest to a misdemeanor domestic violence charge against his wife in May.
7 games	Stephen Jackson	Golden State Warriors	2007	2007–08	On July 15, 2007, Jackson was suspended after pleading guilty to a felony charge of criminal recklessness for firing a gun outside of an Indiana strip club during an altercation in October 2006.
7 games	J. R. Smith	Denver Nuggets	2009	2009–10	On August 28, 2009, Smith was suspended after pleading guilty to a reckless driving charge for a 2007 traffic collision that resulted in the death of a passenger. He was already suspended two games right after the crash.
7 games	Metta World Peace	Los Angeles Lakers	2012	2011–12	On April 24, 2012, World Peace elbowed Oklahoma City Thunder player James Harden in the head during an NBA game.
7 games (originally set to be 20 games) (Entire 2014 NBA playoffs)	Nick Calathes	Memphis Grizzlies	2014	2013–14	After the end of the regular season, on April 18, 2014, Calathes was initially suspended for 20 games after testing positive for tamoxifen, a banned substance. As a result, Calathes would miss the Grizzlies' entire 2014 playoff run, with the rest of the suspension being appealed successfully following Memphis' first-round playoff exit.
7 games	Jimmy Butler	Miami Heat	2025	2024–25	On January 3, 2025, Butler was suspended after the Miami Heat deemed him culpable for "multiple instances of conduct detrimental to the team over the course of the season," mainly expressing his disdain with his own situation involving the Heat during the season.
7 games	Isaiah Stewart	Detroit Pistons	2026	2025–26	On February 9, 2026, during a game where the Pistons were visitors to the Charlotte Hornets, Stewart left the stands to join a physical altercation involving teammate Jalen Duren, and Hornets players Miles Bridges and Moussa Diabaté. Subsequently, Duren was suspended two games, while the Hornets players were suspended for four games. Stewart was suspended for seven due to a "repeated history of unsportsmanlike acts".
6 games	Dennis Rodman	Chicago Bulls	1996	1995–96	On March 18, 1996, Rodman headbutted referee Ted Bernhardt after being ejected during an NBA game against the New Jersey Nets.
6 games	Rick Fox	Los Angeles Lakers	2002	2002–03	On October 25, 2002, Fox got into an on-court altercation with Sacramento Kings player Doug Christie during a preseason game. Following their ejections, Fox ran down the hallway under the stands to confront Christie, starting another fight. Fox served his suspension for the first six games of the regular season.
6 games (originally set to be 10 games)	Maurice Taylor	Houston Rockets	2003	2003–04	On November 8, 2003, Taylor violated the NBA's drug policy. Upon appeal, his original 10-game suspension was reduced to six games.
6 games	Ben Wallace	Detroit Pistons	2004	2004–05	On November 19, 2004, Wallace shoved Indiana Pacers player Ron Artest after a hard foul during an NBA game, leading to a large brawl between players and fans.
6 games	D. J. Mbenga	Dallas Mavericks	2006	2005–06	On June 2, 2006, Mbenga entered the stands to aid the wife of head coach Avery Johnson, who was in a confrontation with two fans.
6 games	Mardy Collins	New York Knicks	2006	2006–07	On December 16, 2006, Collins flagrantly fouled Denver Nuggets player J. R. Smith and tried to attack Nuggets player Carmelo Anthony during a brawl in an NBA game.
6 games	Willie Reed	Detroit Pistons	2017	2016–17	On February 6, 2017, Reed was suspended following a domestic violence incident against his wife on August 5 of the previous year when he played for the Los Angeles Clippers. After missing the first game a day later against the Brooklyn Nets, the Pistons traded him and future second-round draft picks to the Chicago Bulls for Jameer Nelson on February 8. He was immediately waived by the Bulls. If Reed signs up with an NBA team again, he will still serve his suspension in the regular season before returning to play.
6 games	Dion Waiters	Miami Heat	2019	2019–20	On December 10, 2019, Waiters called in to work sick before posting a picture of himself on a boat celebrating his 28th birthday on his Instagram page. The Heat announced his suspension two days later.

a: Now goes by Metta Sandiford-Artest after previously going by his birth name of Ron Artest until September 16, 2011 and then his newer name of Metta World Peace until May 4, 2020, after retiring from the NBA.

== See also ==
- List of suspensions in the NFL
- Doping in American football
- List of people banned from Major League Baseball
- List of Major League Baseball players suspended for performance-enhancing drugs
- National Basketball Association criticisms and controversies
- NBA records
