= Jim Line =

American basketball player

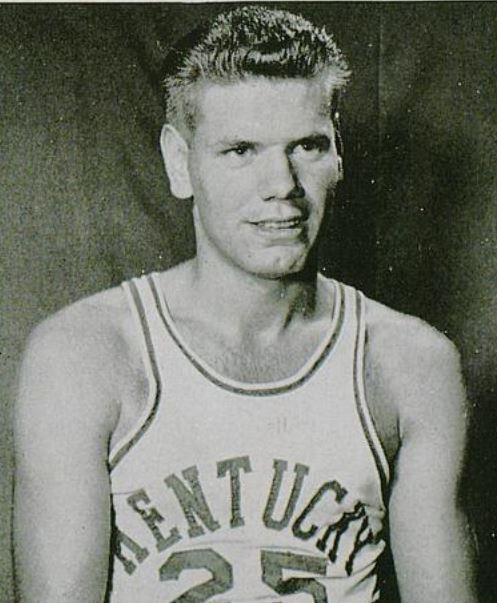
- Line from the 1948 Kentuckian

Personal information
- Born: January 19, 1926 Port Royal, Pennsylvania, U.S.
- Died: January 24, 2013 (aged 87) Russell, Kansas, U.S.
- Listed height: 6 ft 2 in (1.88 m)
- Listed weight: 185 lb (84 kg)

Career information
- High school: North (Akron, Ohio)
- College: Kentucky (1946–1950)
- NBA draft: 1950: 4th round, 45th overall pick
- Drafted by: Indianapolis Olympians
- Position: Forward

Career highlights
- 2× NCAA champion (1948, 1949); Third-team All-American – UPI (1950); First-team All-SEC (1950)
- Stats at Basketball Reference

James R. Line (January 19, 1926 – January 24, 2013) was an American basketball player. He was an All-American at the University of Kentucky and a key player on two NCAA championship teams.

Line, a 6'2" guard/forward from North High School in Akron, Ohio, played for Adolph Rupp at Kentucky from 1946 to 1950. Line was on some of the best Kentucky teams of all time, as the Wildcats went 127–13 in his four years. He started at forward on Kentucky's 1947–48 championship team and played a significant role off of the bench for the 1948–49 team. In his senior year, 1949–50, Line averaged 13.1 points per game and was named a third team All-American by United Press International (UPI), along with teammate Bill Spivey. For his career, Line scored 1,041 points.

After graduation, he was drafted in the fourth round of the 1950 NBA draft by the Indianapolis Olympians, but never played in the National Basketball Association.

In 1952, Line was one of several former Kentucky players implicated in a point shaving scandal, with former teammates Spivey and Walter Hirsch. He was acquitted, however.

Line died on January 24, 2013, at his home in Russell, Kansas.

== See also ==
- List of people banned or suspended by the NBA
