= Jackie Goldsmith =

American basketball player

Personal information
- Born: March 18, 1921 Mainz, Weimar Republic (now Germany)
- Died: October 23, 1968 (aged 47)
- Listed height: 5 ft 8 in (1.73 m)
- Listed weight: 155 lb (70 kg)

Career information
- High school: Thomas Jefferson (Brooklyn, New York)
- College: LIU Brooklyn (1945–1947)
- Playing career: 1941–1949
- Position: Guard

Career history
- 1947–1948: Toledo Jeeps
- 1947–1948: Portland Indians
- 1948–1949: Brooklyn Gothams

Career highlights
- Second-team All-American – Helms (1946)

Jackie Goldsmith (born Hanns Reiner Karl Otto Ludwig Goldschmidt, March 18, 1921 – October 23, 1968) was an American basketball player. He was an All-American at the Brooklyn campus of Long Island University and played for one season in the American National Basketball League.

Goldsmith, a 5'8 guard, came to LIU following a high school career at nearby Thomas Jefferson High School. After a season on the school's freshman team, he spent three years in the United States Coast Guard during World War II, where he played basketball for various coast guard teams including the Diesels and the New London Bears at the Coast Guard Station New London, Connecticut, and the District Coast Guard in New York. After serving in the Coast Guard, he returned to LIU. Following the close of his college career, Goldsmith played briefly for the Toledo Jeeps of the NBL. He also played for the Portland Indians from 1947 to 1948 in the Pacific Coast Professional Basketball League and the Brooklyn Gothams from 1948 to 1949 in the American Basketball League.

In 1951, Goldsmith became one of a number of New York City basketball figures implicated in the 1951 college basketball point-shaving scandal. He was ultimately sentenced to two and a half to four years in prison for fixing games at LIU and Manhattan College.

== See also ==
- List of people banned or suspended by the NBA
