= Dale Barnstable =

American basketball player (1925–2019)

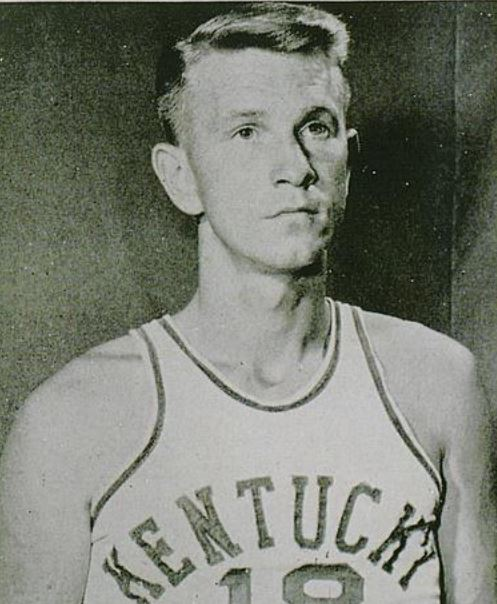
- Barnstable from the 1948 Kentuckian

Personal information
- Born: March 4, 1925 Antioch, Illinois, U.S.
- Died: January 26, 2019 (aged 93) Louisville, Kentucky, U.S.
- Listed height: 6 ft 3 in (1.91 m)
- Listed weight: 175 lb (79 kg)

Career information
- High school: Antioch (Antioch, Illinois)
- College: Kentucky (1946–1950)
- NBA draft: 1950: 7th round, 73rd overall pick
- Drafted by: Boston Celtics
- Position: Shooting guard / small forward
- Number: 18

Career highlights
- 2× NCAA champion (1948, 1949); Third-team All-SEC (1949)
- Stats at Basketball Reference

Dale Barnstable (March 4, 1925 – January 26, 2019) was an American basketball player from Antioch, Illinois who was banned for life from the National Basketball Association (NBA) in 1951 for point shaving during his college career at the University of Kentucky.

== Early life ==
Barnstable was born in Antioch, Illinois. Barnstable attended the Antioch Community High School, where he anchored his athletic career.

== College career ==
After high school, he was recruited by the University of Kentucky where he played for Hall of Fame coach Adolph Rupp at the Kentucky Wildcats men's basketball from 1946 to 1950. While there, Barnstable was a key player on Rupp's first two championship teams in 1948 and 1949. Barnstable was a starter on the 1949 team, earning third team All-Southeastern Conference honors that season. For his Wildcat career, Barnstable scored 635 points (4.9 per game).

== Professional career ==
=== Boston Celtics (1950–1951) ===
Towards the end of his college career, Barnstable was drafted in the seventh round of the 1950 NBA draft by the Boston Celtics.

=== 1951 college basketball point-shaving scandal ===
In 1951 Barnstable became a key figure in a point shaving scandal – In the wake of an increasing number of point shaving schemes coming to light throughout the year, on October 20 Barnstable was arrested along with teammates Ralph Beard and Alex Groza for allegedly taking $500 to shave points in a National Invitation Tournament game in 1949. Although his sentence was suspended, as a result of the affair he lost his first post-graduation job as a high school coach at duPont Manual High School in Louisville, Kentucky, and was banned for life from the NBA by NBA president Maurice Podoloff.

== Personal life ==
After losing his high school coaching job, Barnstable worked at American Air Filter in Louisville as a salesman until retirement. In the meantime, he became a talented golfer, winning the Kentucky Senior Open twice and playing in The Senior Open Championship (the first Kentucky amateur to do so). As a result, Kentucky state golfers in their 60's are eligible for the Dale Barnstable Award awarded to the best amateur golfer in the state.

Barnstable was the father of identical twin actresses, Patricia "Tricia" Barnstable and Priscilla "Cyb" Barnstable, known for their roles in the television series Quark.

Barnstable died on January 26, 2019, aged 93.

== See also ==
- List of people banned or suspended by the NBA
