= Walter Hirsch =

American basketball player (1929–2022)

Personal information
- Born: July 15, 1929 Dayton, Ohio, U.S.
- Died: May 10, 2022 (aged 92) Mason City, Iowa, U.S.
- Listed height: 6 ft 4 in (1.93 m)
- Listed weight: 180 lb (82 kg)

Career information
- High school: Northridge (Dayton, Ohio)
- College: Kentucky (1947–1951)
- Position: Forward
- Number: 19

Career highlights
- 3× NCAA champion (1948, 1949, 1951); Second-team All-SEC (1950)

Walter E. Hirsch (July 15, 1929 – May 10, 2022) was an American college basketball player. He is known for winning three NCAA championships at the University of Kentucky, and for being a central figure in the point shaving scandal that impacted American college basketball in the 1950s.

== Early life ==
Hirsch was born in Dayton, Ohio, on July 15, 1929. He attended Northridge High School in his hometown, where he received All-Ohio honors, and was part of the school's basketball team that won the Class B state championship in 1945.

== College career ==
After graduating from high school in 1947, Hirsch was awarded a scholarship to study at the University of Kentucky. There he played for the Wildcats under future Hall of Fame coach Adolph Rupp. During his time at UK, Hirsch was a part of three championship teams, in 1948, 1949 and 1951.

As a freshman in 1947–48, Hirsch appeared in 13 regular-season games for the Wildcats. As a sophomore and junior, Hirsch moved into the Wildcats regular rotation, and as a senior was the captain of UK's 1950–51 championship team. While he made the SEC All-tournament team in 1951, he was declared ineligible for the 1951 NCAA tournament as he was a fourth year varsity player (prohibited at that time).

After his career was over, Hirsch became embroiled in a point shaving scandal that implicated players from seven different schools across the nation. Hirsch, along with former UK teammates Bill Spivey and Jim Line, was accused of taking money to affect the outcome of several games during the 1950–51 season. Hirsch and Line admitted to shaving points and implicated Spivey as well. However, Hirsch was never formally charged.

Hirsch's involvement with gamblers led to a ban from minor league baseball for the promising first baseman prospect. He was coming off a strong 1952 season for the Danville Dans of the Mississippi–Ohio Valley League, but Minor League president George Trautman (a former college basketball coach himself at Ohio State) declared him permanently banned from minor league baseball.

== Personal life ==
Hirsch married Vicki Pals in October 1960. They met while he was working in Waterloo, Iowa, and remained married until her death. Together, they had two children: Pam and Nancy.

Hirsch joined the US Army after completing his studies at Kentucky and served from 1952 to 1954. Upon his return from military service, he was employed by the Rath Packing Company. He died on May 10, 2022, in Mason City, Iowa. He was 92, and suffered from a brief unspecified illness prior to his death.

== See also ==
- List of people banned or suspended by the NBA
