= Mark Stevens (venture capitalist) =

Fidel 09/11/1993 accionista

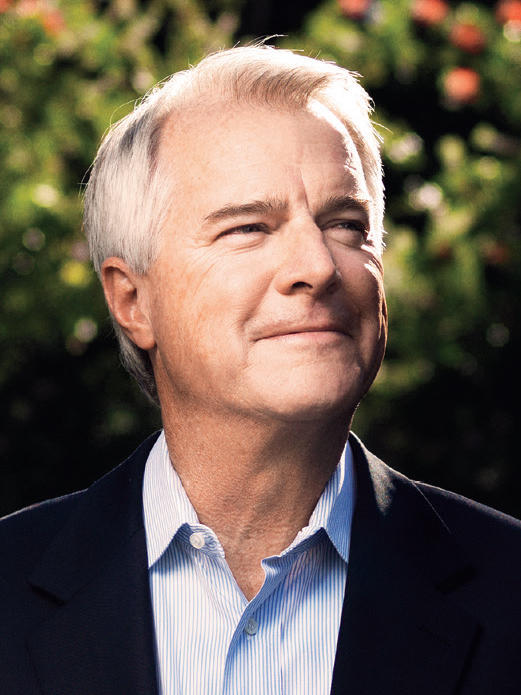
- Stevens in 2017
- Born: Mark Anthony Stevens; February 17, 1960 (age 66); Los Angeles County, California, U.S.
- Education: University of Southern California (BA, BS, MS); Harvard University (MBA)
- Occupation: Venture capitalist
- Known for: Partner, Sequoia Capital
- Board member of: Nvidia
- Spouse: Mary Virginia Mathews (m. 1993)
- Children: 3
- Website: markstevens.com

Mark Anthony Stevens (born February 17, 1960) is an American billionaire venture capitalist, and a partner at S-Cubed Capital based in Menlo Park, California. He was previously with Intel and Sequoia Capital. He is on the board of Nvidia, and a part owner of the Golden State Warriors of the National Basketball Association. As of September 2025, Forbes estimated his net worth at $10.5 billion.

== Early life ==
Stevens was born in Los Angeles County, California to Richard Stevens, a U.S. Navy veteran and an environmental test engineer at Hughes Aircraft Company, and Italian American Carmela Larocca, a former administrative assistant at Hughes Aircraft Company. Stevens has a sister. Stevens grew up in Culver City, California, and graduated from Culver City High School. Stevens then attended and earned bachelor's degrees in electrical Engineering and economics in 1981 and a master's degree in computer engineering in 1984 from the University of Southern California. Stevens then earned an MBA from Harvard Business School in 1989. During his time at USC, Stevens was a member of the Phi Kappa Psi fraternity.

== Career ==
Stevens joined Intel in 1982, then a mid-sized company about to capitalize on the PC boom. He joined as a technical salesperson and worked in a variety of marketing and sales roles while also earning his master's degree in computer engineering from USC. He left in 1987 to pursue an MBA at Harvard Business School.

In 1989, Stevens became a partner at Sequoia Capital and began to concentrate on semiconductor, software, and systems-related investments. Over the years, he became a rising star on Forbes magazine's Midas List of top 100 venture capitalists, climbing as high as 10th place. He was a director of at least 12 companies during this time. Stevens invested in Nvidia in 1993 and joined its board of directors that same year, remaining on the board until 2006 and rejoining in 2008. As of mid-2024, he was the second largest insider shareholder, with holdings valued at nearly $5 billion.

Stevens was previously one of the five voting partners at Sequoia Capital who were jointly responsible for some of the high-tech industry's most successful investments: Google, Yahoo!, Nvidia, YouTube, and others. He is the founder and a partner of S-Cubed Capital.

== Philanthropy ==
In 2004, Stevens and his wife Mary donated $22 million to the University of Southern California and to help found the USC Stevens Institute for Technology Commercialization to advance engineering within the USC Viterbi School of Engineering. It was later renamed USC Stevens Center for Innovation, having expanded its scope to include other disciplines.

Stevens and his wife also donated $10 million to establish the USC Mark and Mary Stevens Center for Orthobiologics at the Keck School of Medicine of USC. In 2025, they contributed an additional $10 million as cornerstone donors to USC Athletics' Bloom Football Performance Center.

In 2015, Stevens and his wife donated $50 million to endow and name the USC Mark and Mary Stevens Neuroimaging and Informatics Institute. The institute's goal is to enhance knowledge of brain science through the application of imaging and information technologies. In 2017, the institute received FDA clearance for clinical use of the first seven-Tesla MRI scanner in North America. In 2019, the institute, along with the Michael J. Fox Foundation for Parkinson's Research, announced the addition of more than 108 terabytes of RNA sequencing data to its open access portal associated with the Parkinson's Progression Markers Initiative.

In May 2026, Stevens and his wife donated $200 million to the University of Southern California to support AI and computing research. In recognition of the gift, USC renamed its School of Advanced Computing, the university's interdisciplinary hub for AI research and education, launched in 2024 as the USC Mark and Mary Stevens School of Computing and Artificial Intelligence.

Stevens is a member of the USC Viterbi School of Engineering Board of Councilors and, since 2001, the USC Board of Trustees. He previously wason the board of trustees of the Menlo School in Menlo Park, California.

Mark and his wife Mary Stevens are also signatories of The Giving Pledge which was started by Warren Buffett and Bill Gates.

== Sports ventures ==
=== Golden State Warriors ===
Stevens became an investor in the Golden State Warriors of the NBA in 2013 by purchasing shares formerly held by Vivek Ranadivé. He was ejected from Oracle Arena during Game 3 of the 2019 NBA Finals, after an altercation with Kyle Lowry of the Toronto Raptors. The Warriors, as well as the league, eventually banned Stevens for a year from all games, arenas, and team activities. He was also fined $500,000 for the incident. Stevens reached out to Lowry and attempted to directly apologize to him along with other members of the Raptors and Warriors organizations and he expressed gratitude to those who accepted his calls. A 2016 New York Times analysis of the team's value suggested it had more than doubled from Stevens’ 2013 investment.

=== Seattle Seahawks ===
Stevens was part of the investment group led by Neeru Khosla and her family in the purchase of the Seattle Seahawks. Upon the sale of the team being finalized on September 3, 2026, Stevens became a minority owner of the team.

== Personal life ==
Stevens is married to Mary Virginia Mathews. The couple have three children together, and reside in Steamboat Springs, CO and Atherton, California.

== See also ==
- List of people banned or suspended by the NBA
