= Saul S. Streit =

Polish-American lawyer and politician (1897–1983)

Saul S. Streit (May 5, 1897 – September 3, 1983) was a Polish-born Jewish-American lawyer, politician, and judge from New York City.

== Life ==
Streit was born on May 5, 1897, in Poland as the son of Jacob Streit and Bebe Baron. He immigrated to America in 1901.

Streit attended public school in New York City, New York, and Stuyvesant High School. He graduated from New York Law School in 1922, and by 1927 he was working as a lawyer with an office in the Flatiron Building. He was an assistant New York County District Attorney under Joab H. Banton. In 1926, he was elected to the New York State Assembly as a Democrat, representing the New York County 7th District. He served in the Assembly in 1927, 1928, 1929, 1930, 1931, 1932, 1933, 1934, 1935, and 1936.

One of the more progressive members of the Tammany Hall delegation in the Assembly, Streit served as chairman of the joint legislative committee to investigate bondholders, stockholders, and creditors committees. In his first Assembly session, he introduced a bill passed and signed by Governor Al Smith to amend the Fraudulent Check Law in an attempt to reduce the number of frauds from passing worthless checks and voted with Republicans on a bill that made a seller of poison liquor guilty of first-degree manslaughter. In later sessions, he sponsored bills to oppose ticket speculation, memorialize Congress for repealing the Volstead Act, curb misleading medical reports in radio advertisements, create "people's counsels" in public utility proceedings, study methods of providing security against unemployment, curb alimony jailing, and defining the new crime of "fixing." He also sponsored a bill to create a charter commission for New York City and introduced a bill for Congressional reapportionment, although he previously attacked a Republican reapportionment bill as a gerrymander.

In November 1936, Streit was elected Judge of the Court of General Sessions. He succeeded Jonah J. Goldstein to the Court, who in turn was appointed earlier in the year to fill a vacancy caused by the death of Otto A. Rosalsky. He was inducted to the Court in January 1937. In late 1951 and early 1952, Streit served as the primary judge for the majority of the suspects involved in what's commonly known as the CCNY point-shaving scandal, despite it involving more universities than just the previous "Grand Slam" basketball champion City College of New York. In 1954, he was elected unopposed Justice of the New York Supreme Court, First District, with nominations from three parties. In 1962, he was appointed Administrative Judge of the First District. As Administrative Judge, he helped complete the merger of the General Sessions Court in Manhattan and the Bronx County Court into the newly-consolidated Supreme Court. He served as a delegate of the 1967 New York State Constitutional Convention. At one point, he handled a case involving Jacqueline Kennedy Onassis's fight with writer William Manchester over his book The Death of a President. He retired as Justice in 1972 and joined the law offices of Shea, Gould, Climenko and Kramer as counsel to the firm.

Streit was a member of the New York City Bar Association, the New York County Lawyers' Association, the New York State Bar Association, the American Bar Association, the Freemasons, the Level Club, and the Young Mens Philanthropic League. In 1958, he married Jean F. McBride, a television actress who appeared in the daytime television serial Love of Life. Together, they had a son named Saul S. Streit Jr.

Streit died at home on September 3, 1983.

New York State Assembly
Preceded by John L. Buckley	New York State Assembly; New York County, 7th District; 1927–1936	Succeeded by Irwin D. Davidson
