= Maurice Podoloff =

American sports executive and lawyer (1890–1985)

President of the American Hockey League
- In office June 28, 1938 – June 1, 1952
- Succeeded by: Emory D. Jones

1st President of the NBA
- In office June 6, 1946 – September 1, 1963
- Succeeded by: J. Walter Kennedy

Personal details
- Born: August 18, 1890 Yelisavetgrad, Kherson Governorate, Russian Empire
- Died: November 24, 1985 (aged 95) New Haven, Connecticut, U.S.
- Education: Yale University; Yale Law School (JD)
- Occupation: Lawyer, sports executive

Maurice Podoloff (August 18, 1890 – November 24, 1985) was an American lawyer and a basketball and ice hockey administrator. He served as the president of the Basketball Association of America (BAA) from 1946 to 1949, and the National Basketball Association (NBA) from 1949 to 1963, making Podoloff the de facto first commissioner in NBA history.

== Biography ==
Podoloff was born to a Russian Jewish family in the Russian Empire, on or about August 18, 1890. Doubt remains about birthplace and birthday; some claim he was born in Yelisavetgrad, but he himself said he did not know exactly: "I guess they didn't keep records in Russia in those days", he said. "I was born on either Aug. 18 or Aug. 31, and it was somewhere in Ukraine, possibly near Odessa." As a child, his family immigrated to the United States, where he graduated from Hillhouse High School in New Haven, Connecticut in 1909, and then from Yale University in New Haven with a Juris Doctor degree in 1915.

In 1926, Podoloff opened the New Haven Arena on Grove Street in downtown New Haven with his father Abraham and brothers Nathan and Jacob. The Arena held over 4,000 people and hosted ice hockey, concerts, and circus events before it was demolished in 1974.

The Podoloffs also owned the New Haven Eagles hockey team, a charter member of the Canadian-American Hockey League. Maurice Podoloff served on the league’s board of governors, and later became secretary-treasurer of the league in 1935.

On June 6, 1946, while still serving as president of the AHL, he was appointed president of the newly formed Basketball Association of America (BAA). He would continue as head of the AHL until 1952.

After BAA teams signed several players in the National Basketball League, Podoloff negotiated a merger with the NBL to form the National Basketball Association, or NBA, in 1949.

As president, Podoloff expanded the NBA to 17 teams in three divisions and worked out a 557-game schedule.

He introduced the BAA's collegiate draft in 1947, and in 1954 instituted the NBA's 24-second shot clock created by Dan Biasone, owner of the Syracuse Nationals, and his executive vice-president, Leo Ferris, which quickened the pace of games. That same year, he increased national recognition of the NBA through its first television contract.

During his NBA presidency, he meted out lifetime suspensions to 32 players who were involved in a point shaving scandal in 1951. Among these players were Indianapolis Olympians players Ralph Beard and Alex Groza for their actions at University of Kentucky, and 1951's number one draft pick Gene Melchiorre, for his actions at Bradley University.

He stepped down as NBA president in 1963.

== Legacy ==
In his honor, the NBA named its annual league Most Valuable Player trophy the Maurice Podoloff Trophy, which lasted until 2022. Podoloff was subsequently honored with a new trophy dedicated in his name for the team with the best regular season record.

In 1974, Podoloff was inducted into the Naismith Memorial Basketball Hall of Fame, and in 2011 was inducted into the American Hockey League Hall of Fame. He was inducted into the International Jewish Sports Hall of Fame in 1989.
