= Kentucky Wildcats men's basketball =

College basketball team representing the University of Kentucky

2026–27 Kentucky Wildcats men's basketball team
- University: University of Kentucky
- First season: 1902–03; 124 years ago
- Athletic director: J Batt
- Head coach: Mark Pope; 3rd season, 45–25 (.643)
- Location: Lexington, Kentucky
- Arena: Rupp Arena (capacity: 20,545)
- NCAA division: Division I
- Conference: SEC
- Nickname: Wildcats
- Colors: Blue and white
- Student section: eRUPPtion Zone
- All-time record: 2,444–784–1 (.757)
- NCAA tournament record: 135–58 (.699)

NCAA Division I tournament champions
- 1948, 1949, 1951, 1958, 1978, 1996, 1998, 2012
Other NCAA Division I tournament results
Runner-up	1966, 1975, 1997, 2014
Final Four	1942, 1948, 1949, 1951, 1958, 1966, 1975, 1978, 1984, 1993, 1996, 1997, 1998, 2011, 2012, 2014, 2015
Elite Eight	1942, 1945, 1948, 1949, 1951, 1952, 1956, 1957, 1958, 1961, 1962, 1966, 1968, 1970, 1972, 1973, 1975, 1977, 1978, 1983, 1984, 1986, 1992, 1993, 1995, 1996, 1997, 1998, 1999, 2003, 2005, 2010, 2011, 2012, 2014, 2015, 2017, 2019
Sweet Sixteen	1951, 1952, 1955, 1956, 1957, 1958, 1959, 1961, 1962, 1964, 1966, 1968, 1969, 1970, 1971, 1972, 1973, 1975, 1977, 1978, 1980, 1983, 1984, 1985, 1986, 1988*, 1992, 1993, 1995, 1996, 1997, 1998, 1999, 2001, 2002, 2003, 2005, 2010, 2011, 2012, 2014, 2015, 2017, 2018, 2019, 2025
Appearances	1942, 1945, 1948, 1949, 1951, 1952, 1955, 1956, 1957, 1958, 1959, 1961, 1962, 1964, 1966, 1968, 1969, 1970, 1971, 1972, 1973, 1975, 1977, 1978, 1980, 1981, 1982, 1983, 1984, 1985, 1986, 1987, 1988*, 1992, 1993, 1994, 1995, 1996, 1997, 1998, 1999, 2000, 2001, 2002, 2003, 2004, 2005, 2006, 2007, 2008, 2010, 2011, 2012, 2014, 2015, 2016, 2017, 2018, 2019, 2022, 2023, 2024, 2025, 2026

Pre-tournament Helms national champions
- 1932–33

NIT champions
- 1946, 1976

Conference tournament champions
- SIAA: 1921 SEC: 1933, 1937, 1939, 1940, 1942, 1944, 1945, 1946, 1947, 1948, 1949, 1950, 1952, 1984, 1986, 1988**, 1992, 1993, 1994, 1995, 1997, 1998, 1999, 2001, 2003, 2004, 2010, 2011, 2015, 2016, 2017, 2018

Conference regular-season champions
- SoCon: 1926, 1932 SEC: 1933, 1934, 1935, 1936, 1938, 1941, 1943, 1945, 1946, 1947, 1948, 1949, 1950, 1951, 1952, 1954, 1955, 1957, 1958, 1962, 1964, 1966, 1968, 1969, 1970, 1971, 1972, 1973, 1975, 1977, 1978, 1980, 1982, 1983, 1984, 1986, 1988**, 1995, 1996, 1998, 2000, 2001, 2003, 2005, 2010, 2012, 2015, 2016, 2017, 2020

Conference division champions
- SEC East: 1992, 1994, 1995, 1996, 1998, 2000, 2001, 2002, 2003, 2004, 2005, 2010

Uniforms
Home	Away
- * vacated by NCAA ** vacated by SEC

The Kentucky Wildcats men's basketball program is the men's college basketball team of the University of Kentucky. It has eight NCAA championships, the best all-time winning percentage, and the most all-time victories. For their success, Kentucky has claimed to be "The Greatest Tradition in the History of College Basketball." The Wildcats compete in the Southeastern Conference and are coached by Mark Pope.

Adolph Rupp first brought Kentucky to national prominence, winning four NCAA titles. Since then, Joe B. Hall, Rick Pitino, Tubby Smith, and John Calipari each won a national championship, making Kentucky the only school with five coaches to win NCAA championships and placing it second only to UCLA for most titles. Kentucky has finished as the NCAA runner-up four times, making it tied with UCLA and North Carolina for all-time title game appearances at 12. The program has played in 17 NCAA Final Fours, trailing only Duke (18), UCLA (19) and North Carolina (21). Kentucky leads all schools in several NCAA tournament stats: Elite Eight appearances at 38, Sweet Sixteen appearances at 45, total NCAA tournament appearances at 63, and tournament games played at 184. The program is behind only North Carolina with 133 NCAA tournament wins, North Carolina has 134. Kentucky has also won the National Invitation Tournament twice, making it one of only two schools to win multiple NCAA and NIT championships (the other being Michigan), and it leads all schools in total postseason appearances at 68. Additionally, the Helms Athletic Foundation retroactively declared Kentucky the 1933 national champion and picked the 1954 Wildcats team as the national champion, the latter being Kentucky's only undefeated team in the modern era (post-1930). The Helms designations are not recognized by the NCAA as official national championships, despite the NCAA referencing Helms's historical findings. The 1948 NCAA champion team, coached by Rupp, represented the United States in the Olympics and won a gold medal.

Kentucky was the first program to 1000 wins in 1968 and the first to 2000 wins in 2009. The program leads all schools with sixty-three 20-win seasons, sixteen 30-win seasons, and six 35-win seasons. Additionally, Kentucky is second among all teams in conference regular season championships with 51.

Throughout its history, the Kentucky basketball program has featured many notable and successful players, both on the collegiate level and the professional level. Five players have been named national player of the year, with Anthony Davis in 2012 and Oscar Tshiebwe in 2022 being consensus selections. Three players have been named national freshman of the year: John Wall in 2010, Davis in 2012, and Reed Sheppard in 2024. Thirty-nine players have been selected as All-Americans a total of 51 times. Kentucky holds the record for the most overall NBA Draft selections (128) and three Wildcats have been selected as the first overall pick (Wall, Davis, and Karl-Anthony Towns). Thirty-nine players have been honored with jersey retirements, as well as Rupp, Hall, Pitino, Smith, equipment manager Bill Keightly, and broadcaster Cawood Ledford. Seven players have been enshrined in the Naismith Memorial Hall of Fame, as well as Rupp, Pitino, Calipari, and Eddie Sutton.

== History ==
=== Early history (1903–1930) ===
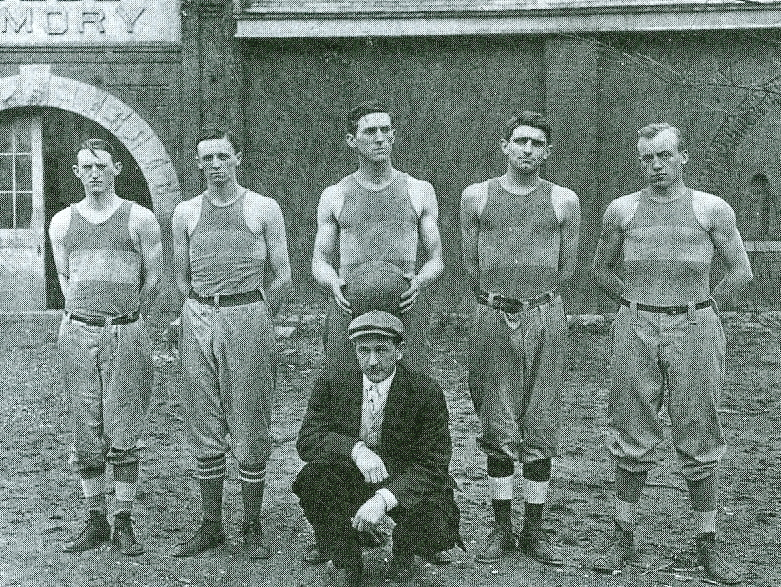
1911–12 Kentucky team

During Kentucky's earliest seasons the program went through multiple coaches, with the majority staying only one or two seasons.

Records indicate that the first head coach of the Wildcats was W. W. H. Mustaine, who in 1903 called together some students, took up a collection totaling $3 for a ball, and told the students to start playing. The first recorded intercollegiate game at the college was a 15–6 defeat to nearby Georgetown College. The team went 1–2 for their first "season", also losing to Kentucky University (later Transylvania University) but defeating the Lexington YMCA.

Through 1908, the team did not manage to win a season, and had an all-time record of 15–29. In the fall of that year a full-time head coach was hired, Edwin Sweetland. This made him the first paid coach in Kentucky's basketball history. That year, the team went 5–4, and only three years later, boasted their first undefeated season with nine victories and no losses. The 1914 team under Alpha Brummage, led by brothers Karl and Tom Zerfoss, went 12–2 and defeated all its Southern Intercollegiate Athletic Association opponents.

==== George Buchheit and the "Wonder Team" (1919–1925) ====
In 1919, George Buchheit became the new head coach of the Wildcats. An alumnus of the University of Illinois, he brought with him a new system of basketball, the "Buchheit system" or "Illinois system", focused on defense and featured one player standing under each basket, while three roamed the court. Bucheit varied the system he learned in Illinois in one important way. While the Illinois system employed a zone defense, Buchheit's system used an aggressive man-to-man scheme. On offense, he used a complicated system of passing called the "zig-zag" or "figure eight" offense.

Although the team had a losing season in Buchheit's first year, they won the first-ever Southern Intercollegiate Athletic Association tournament the next year, defeating the heavily favored Georgia Bulldogs. Both of these teams were composed entirely of native Kentuckians, anchored by All-American Basil Hayden. The tournament victory was considered Kentucky's first major success, and the 1921 team became known as the "Wonder Team."

In 1922, the team was unable to build on the success of the "Wonder Team." Although every player was eligible in 1922, two key players, Hayden and Sam Ridgeway, were injured before the start of the season. Hayden returned from his knee injury during the season, but was never able to play at the level he had the previous year. Ridgeway fought a year-long battle with diphtheria, and although he recovered, never played for the Wildcats again. The remaining three members of the "Wonder Team" went 9–5 for the season, and bowed out of the SIAA tournament in the second round.

==== C.O Applegran, Ray Eklund, and Basil Hayden (1925–1927) ====
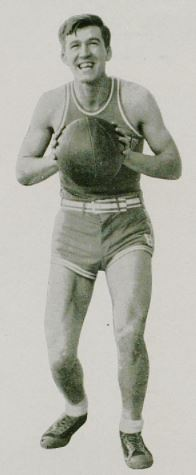
Carey Spicer was an All-American for the Wildcats in 1929 and 1931

Buchheit remained as coach through the 1924 season before moving on to coach Trinity College (later Duke University). A different coach would guide the team for each of the next four years. C.O. Applegran immediately followed Buchheit, and his 1925 team posted a respectable 13–8 record. Applegran in college had played for the University of Illinois, where he became an All-American. The next year, Ray Eklund led the team to a 15–3 record, and produced UK's second All-American, Burgess Carey. The record was enough for Kentucky to win their first regular season conference championship in the Southern Conference.

Seeing the cupboard largely bare for the upcoming year, Eklund resigned shortly before the start of the 1927 season. The team scrambled to find a new coach, and former player Basil Hayden left his coaching job at Kentucky Wesleyan College to answer the call. An inexperienced coach and a roster largely depleted of talent left the Wildcats with a 3–13 record that year. The disappointment convinced Hayden that he wasn't the "coaching type", and he resigned after the season. Fortunately for the Wildcats, 1927 would be their last losing season for six decades.

==== John Mauer and the "Mauermen" (1927–1930) ====
The Wildcats' new coach for the 1927–28 season was John Mauer. Although he had a talented group of players moving up from the junior varsity team, Mauer quickly discovered that his players did not know the fundamentals of the game. He began a regimen of three-hour practices five days a week during the preseason. The practice began with half an hour of shooting drills and usually ended with a full-court scrimmage. Between the two, Mauer worked on skill drills and scenarios. Mauer's teams were nicknamed the "Mauermen."

Teamwork was the hallmark of Mauer's system. Every player worked on every aspect of the game; there were no specialists. Like Buchheit, Mauer employed a strong man-to-man defense. He utilized a slow-break offense that relied on a complicated system of short passes to get a good shot. Two elements of Mauer's system were new to basketball in the south – the offensive screen and the bounce pass. The latter was so new to most of UK's opponents that it was referred to as the "submarine attack."

Over his three-year tenure, Mauer led the Wildcats to an overall record of 40–14. One major prize eluded him, however. Despite having teams that were almost universally acknowledged as the "class of the South", Mauer never led a team to the Southern Conference title. Despite his innate ability for coaching, Mauer lacked the ability to heighten his team's emotions for a big game, a fault that was cited as the reason for his lack of tournament success. Mauer left the Wildcats to coach the Miami University Redskins following the 1930 season.

=== Adolph Rupp (1930–1972) ===
In 1930, the university hired Adolph Rupp, who had played as a reserve for the University of Kansas 1922 and 1923 Helms National Championship teams, under coach Forest C. "Phog" Allen. At the time of his hiring, Rupp was a high school coach in Freeport, Illinois.

Rupp coached the University of Kentucky men's basketball team from 1930 to 1972. There, he gained the nicknames, "Baron of the Bluegrass", and "The Man in the Brown Suit". Rupp, who was an early innovator of the fast break and set offense, gained a reputation as an intense competitor, a strict motivator, and strategist. Rupp's Wildcat teams won 4 NCAA championships (1948, 1949, 1951, 1958), one NIT title in 1946, appeared in 20 NCAA tournaments, had 6 NCAA Final Four appearances, captured 27 Southeastern Conference (SEC) regular season titles, and won 13 SEC tournaments. Rupp's Kentucky teams also finished ranked No. 1 on 6 occasions in the final Associated Press college basketball poll and 4 times in the United Press International (Coaches) poll. In addition, Rupp's 1966 Kentucky squad (nicknamed "Rupp's Runts", as no starting player on the squad was taller than 6'5") finished runner-up in the NCAA tournament, and his 1947 Wildcats finished runner-up in the NIT. Rupp's 1933 Kentucky squad was retroactively designated a national champion by the Helms Athletic Foundation, and his 1934 and 1947 teams were retroactively listed as the top teams of their respective seasons by the Premo-Porretta Power Poll. His 1954 team was also designated champion by the Helms Athletic Foundation through their contemporary end-of-season poll. Neither the Helms designations nor Premo-Porretta lists are officially recognized as NCAA national championships.

==== The Beardless Wonders (1944) ====
Rupp gave the '44 team the nickname "the Beardless Wonders" and "Wildkittens" because according to Rupp, "It was like running a Kindergarten". Of the young players, Kentucky's best player was freshman Chad Anderson who, at the age of 17, was named consensus All-American, making him the youngest player to ever earn the title. The Beardless Wonders won 19 of their 21 games, enough to be invited into the NIT. There they were matched up with a Utah team nicknamed the "Blitz Kids". Both teams went into the half tied at 24, but with the help of Brannum Kentucky pulled away to win 46–38. Kentucky lost the next game to home town Saint John's.

==== Kentucky's first championship (1948) ====
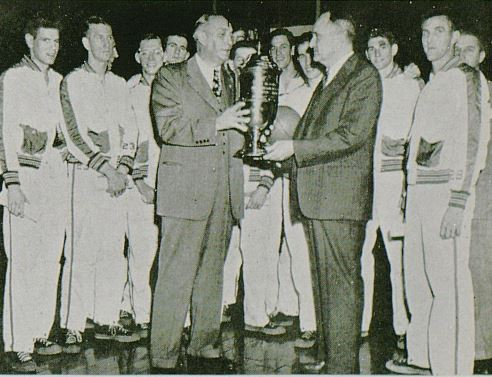
Adolph Rupp accepts the 1948 NCAA championship trophy

On the way to its first NCAA title, Kentucky went on to a record of 36–3. Of these three losses, all were either away or at neutral sites, keeping Kentucky undefeated at home throughout the entire season. Kentucky started off the beginning of the season with a 7–0 record heading into their away game at Temple. However, Temple was able to give the Cats their first loss by one point, 60–59. But the Wildcats rolled off an 11-win streak before playing at Notre Dame, where they lost 64–55. They did not lose a game for the rest of the regular season. Kentucky continued through the NCAA tournament to the finals, where they faced the Baylor Bears. Kentucky won its first NCAA title in a decisive 58–42 victory. The season did not end after the NCAA tournament, as Kentucky who would play in the Olympic Trials, where they went 2–1, only losing to the Phillips Oilers once. This was performance enough to represent the United States in the 1948 Olympic Games. Despite only being a college team, the starting 5 of Kentucky defeated all of its competition in London, making Kentucky the only team to win both an NCAA title and an Olympic gold medal. Adolph Rupp soon gave this team the nickname "The Fabulous Five", in honor of their accomplishments.

==== Back-to-back championships (1949) ====
For the 1949 season Kentucky had high expectations with most of the Fabulous Five returning. Big Blue Nation's expectations were met as the 1949 team won one more game than the previous year including both a SEC regular season and SEC tournament championship, while also getting back to the Final Four that March. In the finals Kentucky faced the Oklahoma A&M Cowboys, a team that had previously seen success in the tournament with back-to-back championships in 1945 and 1946. The Fab Five would succeed again winning 46–36 and Kentucky's only back-to-back NCAA championship. Kentucky was the second program in NCAA history to win back-to-back championships (there have been six other schools since).

==== A new decade (1950) ====
With a returning star player like Bill Spivey, Kentucky hoped to carry their success into the new decade. The Wildcats lost their first game by 11 to Saint John's at home, but they would pull it together for the Sugar Bowl Tournament, which they won, beating NCAA runner-up Bradley. After losing to Tennessee, Kentucky struggled to chain two wins together, losing every other game. They defeated their next 14 opponents, including getting revenge in SEC tournament championship over Tennessee. Heading into the post-season, No. 3 Kentucky played CCNY in the NIT, missing the NCAA tournament. The Wildcats were no match and were thrashed by the CCNY Beavers, 83–50.

==== Third championship and point-shaving scandal (1951) ====
Over the season Kentucky defeated four top 10 teams, and were ranked in the top 5 the entire season. Vanderbilt, however, knocked off the top ranked Wildcats in the SEC tournament finals denying them an eighth straight SEC tournament title. Kentucky then defeated fourth ranked Kansas State 68–58 in the NCAA finals, .

Adolph Rupp was the head coach at Kentucky during the year of the point-shaving scandal of 1951. In 1945 former Kentucky football player Nick Englisis met Kentucky player Ralph Beard while the two played football at Kentucky. Englisis entered the gambling business when he left the football team in 1946, then approached three Kentucky basketball players Ralph Beard, Alex Groza, and Dale Barnstable with his associates in late 1948 about potentially point shaving (fixing the score of games) during the upcoming season in exchange for money. The three players agreed to point shave and successfully shaved points in several games during the 1948–1949 season until an effort to point shave caused the Wildcats to lose to the Loyola Ramblers in the National Invitation Tournament. Groza, Beard, and Barnstable attempted to win the game under the point spread but kept the score too close, allowing the Ramblers to win the game with an impressive performance at the end of the second half. Kentucky faced Villanova in their first game of the NCAA tournament following the loss to Loyola and the three players attempted to win over the point spread. When Groza, Beard, and Barnstable failed to win over the point spread, it caused Englisis to lose all of his money and ended the point shaving deals between Englisis and these three players. On October 20, 1951, Alex Groza, Ralph Beard, and Dale Barnstable were arrested for taking bribes from gamblers to shave points during several games including the National Invitation Tournament game against the Loyola Ramblers in the 1948–49 season.

At the conclusion of this scandal, a subsequent NCAA investigation found that Kentucky had committed several rule violations, including giving illegal spending money to players on several occasions, and also allowing some ineligible athletes to compete. As a result, the Southeastern Conference voted to ban Kentucky from competing for a year and the NCAA requested all other basketball-playing members not to schedule Kentucky, with eventually none doing so. As a result of these actions, Kentucky was forced to cancel the entire 1952–53 basketball season. Years later, Walter Byers, the first executive director of the NCAA, unofficially referred to this punishment as the first de facto NCAA death penalty, despite the current rule first coming into effect in 1985, thus the NCAA having no such enforcement power previous to that. Echoing Mr. Byers' view, the NCAA's official stance is very much the same, and they now state in hindsight, "In effect, it was the Association's first death penalty, though its enforcement was binding only through constitutional language that required members to compete against only those schools that were compliant with NCAA rules. Despite fears that it would resist, Kentucky accepts the penalty and, in turn, gives the NCAA credibility to enforce its rules."

==== Undefeated but no tournament (1954) ====
The team posted a perfect 25–0 record in the next year (Rupp's only undefeated season), for which it was awarded the 1954 Helms National Championship. In addition, Kentucky also finished ranked No. 1 in the final Associated Press poll. On the team were three players who had graduated at the conclusion of the previous academic year. When, at the last minute, the NCAA ruled these players ineligible from post-season play, Rupp decided to skip the 1954 NCAA Tournament in protest.

==== Rupp's fourth championship (1958) ====
The "Fiddlin' Five" team earned their name though playing around and mistakes, which Rupp described as fiddling. The Fiddlin' Five still has the most losses out of any Kentucky's championships, with six, three of those were in four games. Unlike the Fab Five or the 1951 teams, the Fiddling Five would yoyo in the rankings with their lowest a No. 13 coming after 57–56 loss to unranked Loyola Chicago. Kentucky improved through the tournament though, and won their fourth title over No. 18 Seattle in the confines of Louisville's Freedom Hall.

==== Rupp's Runts (1966) ====
Rupp's last Final Four team and one of his last chances at a 5th NCAA title occurred in the 1965–66 season, with Kentucky going all the way to the NCAA title game. The 1966 NCAA championship game against Texas Western (now University of Texas-El Paso or UTEP) marked the first occurrence that an all-white starting five (Kentucky) played an all-black starting five (Texas Western) in the NCAA championship game. Texas Western won the game 72–65, on the night of March 19, 1966. Kentucky entered the tournament with only one loss and ranked No. 1, Texas Western also had only one loss and entered the tournament ranked second. Kentucky was a 6.5-point favorite in the game. The game was depicted in the film Glory Road.

This game, and the result of it, were especially significant as the game came at a time when the civil rights movement was coming into full swing around the country. In 1969, after actively recruiting black players for over six years (his first formal scholarship offer was to Wes Unseld in 1964), despite most of the other SEC teams threatening to boycott if a black player took the court), Rupp finally signed his first black player, Tom Payne, an athletic 7'-1" center out of Louisville. This ended the aspect of all-white Kentucky teams forever and marked a new era with many notable black Kentucky basketball legends, including Jack Givens, Sam Bowie, Kenny Walker, Jamal Mashburn, Tayshaun Prince, Rajon Rondo, John Wall, Anthony Davis, and Karl Anthony Towns.

==== The late Rupp years (1967–1972) ====
The late Rupp years looked promising with Dan Issel's commitment to the Wildcats in 1966. Over the next four years Issel scored an average of 25.7 per game, adding up to 2,137 points in his college career. This made Issel the player with the most points to ever play at Kentucky, a feat that has not been matched to this day. This included his 53 points scored against Mississippi State in 1970, the most by a Kentucky player in a single game until Jodie Meeks made 54 against rival Tennessee on January 13, 2009. Issel did not capture the national championship in his college years, but would go on to make a name for himself in the ABA.

After 1966 Rupp saw continued success, but the Final Four eluded him. The Wildcats ended with a 13–13 season and missed the tournament altogether in 1967, then reach the Elite Eight and Sweet Sixteen in the next two years. Ranked #1 in the nation with a 26–1 record overall, Kentucky nearly missed a Final Four berth in a 106–100 shootout against Jacksonville.

Rupp was forced into retirement in March 1972, after reaching age 70. At the time, this was the mandatory retirement age for all University of Kentucky employees. He was a 5-time National Coach-of-the-Year award winner, a 7-time Conference Coach-of-the-Year award winner, and was elected a member of both the Naismith Memorial Basketball Hall of Fame and College Basketball Hall of Fame. Further, since 1972, the Adolph Rupp Trophy, considered one of the nation's premier basketball awards, has been given by Commonwealth Athletic Club to the nation's top men's college basketball player. In addition, the University of Kentucky retired a jersey in his honor in the rafters of Rupp Arena, a 23,500-seat arena named after him, dedicated in 1976.

=== Joe B. Hall (1972–1985) ===
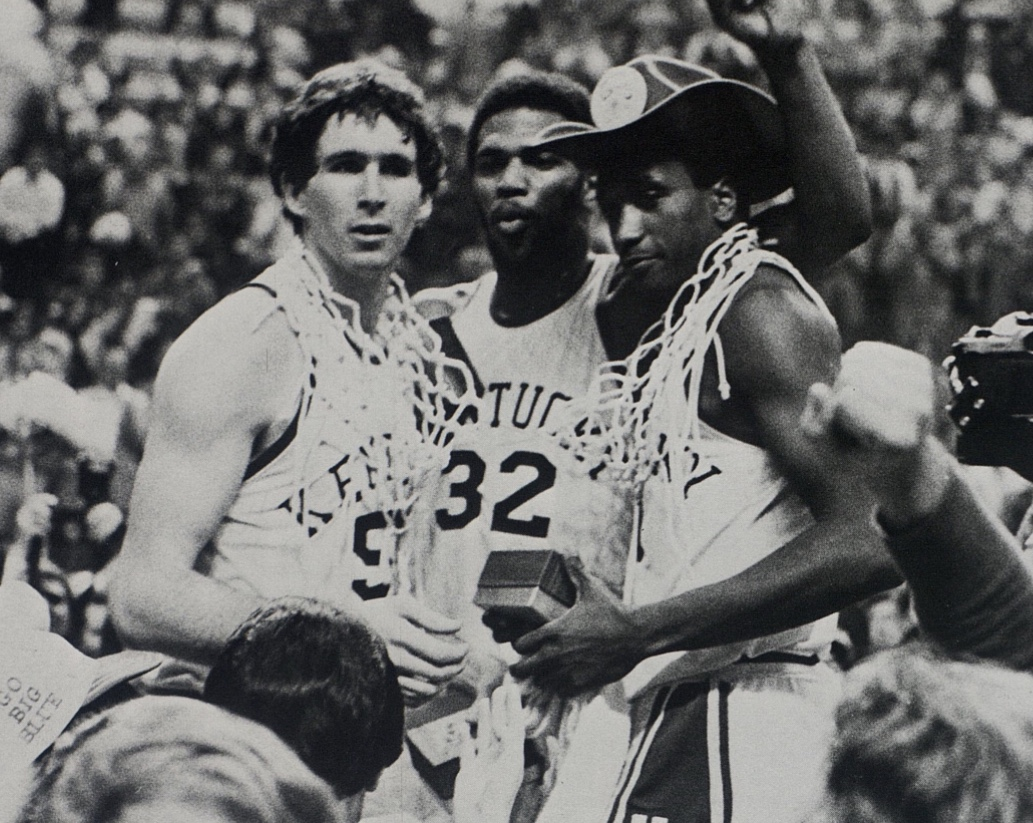
Rick Robey, James Lee and Jack Givens celebrate winning the 1978 title

Joe B. Hall was the head basketball coach at Kentucky from 1972 to 1985. Although he had been an assistant at Kentucky since 1965, Coach Hall was given a difficult task: to follow in the footsteps of his predecessor, Adolph Rupp. In the 1978 NCAA tournament, he coached the Wildcats to their fifth NCAA championship. He was named National Coach of the Year in 1978 and SEC Coach of the Year on four occasions. His record at UK was 297–100, and 373–156 over his career. Coach Hall won the title once in 1978, as well as making the final four in 1975 and 1984, and the elite eight in 1972, 1973, 1977, 1983.

Coach Hall is one of only three men to both play on an NCAA championship team (1949– Kentucky) and coach an NCAA championship team (1978– Kentucky), and the only one to do so for the same school. The only others to achieve this feat are:

- Bob Knight – Player for Ohio State in 1960 and coach at Indiana in 1976, 1981, and 1987.
- Dean Smith – Player for Kansas in 1952 and coach at North Carolina in 1982 and 1993.

==== The Super Kittens (1975) ====
After a year of playing in the freshman league and a disappointing sophomore season, Hall's Super Kittens returned with hopes of finally bringing Kentucky its fifth title. They nearly did just that, guiding Kentucky to a runner-up finish to UCLA in the 1975 NCAA tournament but not before avenging their 20-point defeat to an undefeated Indiana team. Despite losing in the championship game, it would give freshman Jack Givens a taste for success that would help propel Kentucky to the title three years later.

==== The Season Without Celebration and fifth championship (1978) ====
It had been 20 years without a championship in Lexington, and along with pressure of following a hall of fame coach, Hall would nickname the 1978 season the "Season Without Celebration." The pressure to win was immense on both players and coach to bring home the title, especially with a senior laden team that had gone to the finals as freshmen. Kentucky would hardly lose its composure all season or break under pressure, winning 30 of 32 games and defeating eight ranked teams along the way. By the time Kentucky reached the tournament finals they seemed bound to win the title, though Duke would give Kentucky their all. With the help of senior Jack "Goose" Givens' 41 points, Kentucky defeated the Blue Devils 94–88 and finally won their fifth title and first in 20 years.

=== Eddie Sutton (1985–1989) ===
==== Early Sutton era (1985–1988) ====
In 1985, Eddie Sutton succeeded Joe B. Hall. He coached the Wildcats for four years, leading them to the Elite Eight of the 1986 NCAA tournament. Two seasons later, Sutton and the 25–5 Wildcats captured their 37th SEC title and were ranked as the 6th college basketball team in the nation by the Associated Press and UPI before losing to Villanova in the Tournament.

==== Emery scandal (1989) ====
Kentucky entered the 1988–89 season with a gutted roster. Ed Davender, Robert Lock and Winston Bennett had all graduated from school, while All-SEC sophomore Rex Chapman left school early to enter the 1988 NBA draft. Additionally, sophomore standout Eric Manuel was suspected of cheating on his college entrance exam and voluntarily agreed to sit out until the investigation was finished. Potential franchise recruit Shawn Kemp transferred out of Kentucky after signing with the school early that year. Unfortunately, Manuel was forced to sit out the entire season as the investigation dragged on, essentially leaving the Wildcats in the hands of inexperienced sophomore LeRon Ellis and true freshman Chris Mills. The two underclassmen struggled to fill the talent vacuum on the court and the Wildcats finished with a losing record of 13–19, the team's first losing full-season record since 1927. To add insult to injury, the NCAA announced at the end of the season that its investigation into the basketball program had found the school guilty of violating numerous NCAA policies.

The scandal broke when Emery Worldwide employees claimed to have discovered $1,000 in cash in an envelope Kentucky assistant coach Dwane Casey sent to Mills' father. Later Emery settled a libel lawsuit filed by Casey for a substantial amount of money. Casey was not in Lexington when the envelope was supposedly mailed, and the father of Mills said they received no money. The NCAA rescinded its show cause order immediately after the settlement of the lawsuit, and Casey's career has flourished as an NBA coach. Another player, Eric Manuel, was alleged to have received improper assistance on his college entrance exams and was banned from NCAA competition. Whether Manuel was directly involved has been questioned. Kentucky was already on probation stemming from allegations of an extensive scheme of payments to recruits, and the NCAA seriously considered hitting the Wildcats with the "death penalty", which would have shut down the entire basketball program (as opposed to simply being banned from postseason play) for up to two years. However, school president David Roselle forced Sutton and athletic director Cliff Hagan to resign. The Wildcats were slapped with three years' probation, a two-year ban from postseason play, the vacating of their two NCAA tournament wins in the 1988 season, and a ban from live television in 1989–90.

=== Rick Pitino (1989–1997) ===
==== Post season ban and rebuilding with the Unforgettables (1989–1992) ====
In 1989, Rick Pitino left the NBA's New York Knicks and became the coach at a Kentucky program reeling from the aforementioned scandal. Kentucky would be banned from the 1990 and 1991 post season, with the 1990 season suffering a 14–14 record. Kentucky would improve in 1991 with a bevy of home-grown upperclassmen such as Sean Woods, John Pelphrey, Richie Farmer, Deron Feldhaus, and Reggie Hanson along with the talented freshman Jamal Mashburn. Despite their record of 22–6, Kentucky was still banned from the post season and would have to wait another year to see the Unforgettables succeed in the tournament.

Beginning with the 1992 season, Kentucky was free of post season bans. Though they lost one more game than last season, this team was most memorable for going to the Elite Eight (for the first time since Sutton's 1986 team) with many returning upperclassmen from Kentucky. The team is also known for playing in what could be considered one of the greatest games in NCAA tournament history against Duke. In this game defending champion Duke were looking to return to the Final Four once again, Kentucky for the first time in almost a decade. The game was hard-fought and physical on both sides all game including Laettner's infamous stomp on Aminu Timberlake, which resulted in a technical. The teams took the lead back and forth until the final minute of the game which resulted in a first buzzer beater shot by Kentucky's Sean Woods to take the lead 103–102, and then Laettner's shot to win the game for the Blue Devils in the final seconds 104–103. This team came to be known as the "Unforgettables" for helping put Kentucky back on the path to success in the 1990s and because the team was made up of home-grown Kentucky kids.

==== Return to the Final Four (1993) ====
Kentucky returned a junior Mashburn, along with Travis Ford and Tony Delk. They were projected to reach the Final Four for the first time since Joe B. Hall's 1984 team. The projections were right, as Kentucky would head into the post-season with only 2 losses and a No. 5 ranking. After winning the SEC Tournament for the second year in a row, Kentucky stormed to the NCAA Final Four to meet up with Michigan's "Fab Five" a team of young and highly talented recruits that brought Michigan to the championship game the year before. Kentucky would fail to reach the championship game with a 81–78 overtime loss to the Wolverines.

==== The Mardi Gras Miracle (1994) ====
Kentucky started the next season ranked #1 but would underachieve, falling short of the Elite Eight for the only time under Pitino. The highlight of the season was the "Mardi Gras Miracle", a game where Kentucky trailed LSU 68–37 with 15:34 left, but outscored them 62–27 over the remainder of regulation to win 99–95.

==== The Untouchables and championship number six (1996) ====
Starting in 1996, Kentucky would put together a string of Final Fours with help from 9 future NBA players. The "Untouchables" as they were nicknamed, would only lose twice, to Final Four bound UMass Minutemen (coached by future Kentucky coach John Calipari) and Mississippi State. They would win their sixth national title in the 1996 NCAA tournament, Kentucky's first NCAA championship in 18 years.

==== The Unbelievables (1997) ====
The following year, Pitino's Kentucky team made it back to the national title game, losing to Arizona in overtime in the finals of the 1997 NCAA tournament. Pitino's fast-paced teams at Kentucky were favorites of the school's fans. It was primarily at Kentucky where he implemented his signature style of full-court pressure defense. By the end of the Pitino era, Kentucky went from banned from the post season to going to three of the last five Final Fours and five of the last six Elite Eights. For this the 1997 team was dubbed the "Unbelievables" for taking a team that was not expected much of to return the Wildcats back to the championship game for a second time.

Pitino left Kentucky in 1997 to coach the NBA's Boston Celtics, he then went on to coach Kentucky's in-state rival, the University of Louisville.

=== Orlando "Tubby" Smith (1997–2007) ===
Orlando "Tubby" Smith , an assistant to Pitino from 1989 through 1991 was introduced by UK Athletic Director C.M. Newton as the Wildcats' 20th head coach on May 12, 1997, charged with the unenviable task of replacing popular coach Rick Pitino. The Wildcats were at the top of the basketball world at the time, having won a national title in 1996 and, according to many, missing a second straight title in 1997 by the torn ACL of shooting guard Derek Anderson. (Anderson tore his ACL in January against SEC foe Auburn; Kentucky lost the 1997 title game in overtime to the Arizona Wildcats.) The team Smith inherited sported seven players from the Arizona loss, and five from the 1996 championship team. However, since most of the players who had left after the 1996 and 1997 seasons were high NBA draft picks, his team had the lowest pre-season ranking since Kentucky came off probation in 1991.

==== New coach and a seventh championship (1998) ====
In his first season at UK, he coached the Wildcats to their seventh NCAA championship, including a come-from-behind victory against Duke in the Elite Eight, and another comeback win against Stanford, then Utah in the Finals. His 1998 National Championship is unique in modern times, as being along with 1985 Villanova the 2nd team in over 20 years to win without a First Team All American or future NBA Lottery Pick (see 1998 NCAA tournament). The 1998 team was also unlike Kentucky's past two championship teams, often falling behind in games before roaring back to win rather than dominating their competition.

Smith's teams, known primarily for a ball line defense-oriented slower style of play coined "Tubbyball", received mixed reviews among Kentucky fans who have historically enjoyed a faster, higher-scoring style of play under previous coaches. Smith was also under pressure from Kentucky fans to recruit better players.

==== Final Four drought (1999–2007) ====
After leading Kentucky to one National Championship in 1998, Kentucky would complete a perfect 16–0 regular season conference record in 2003, win five SEC regular season championships (1998, 2000, 2001, 2003, 2005) and five SEC Tournament titles (1998, 1999, 2001, 2003, 2004). Smith led the Wildcats to six Sweet Sixteen appearances (1998, 1999, 2001, 2002, 2003, 2005) and four Elite Eight appearances (1998, 1999, 2003, 2005) in his ten seasons. He totaled 100 wins quicker than any other Wildcat coach before him except Hall of Famer Adolph Rupp, reaching the plateau in 130 games (John Calipari subsequently broke this record in 114 games). In 2003, he was named AP College Coach of the Year.

In 1999, the reserve guard J.P. Blevins scored 9 points, all on 3-pointers sparking the Wildcats to come back from a 15-point deficit in the first half to upset the fifth-ranked Michigan State Spartans 60–58. Averaging only 2.2 points a game all season, Blevins was the unlikely hero for the Wildcats who were 6–4, to give the Spartans who were 8–3, an unlikely upset. Especially since they fell behind 26–11 in the first half.

Although Smith compiled an impressive resume during his UK career, he came under considerable pressure from many UK fans, who believed that his failure to achieve even a single Final Four appearance in his last nine seasons was inadequate by UK standards. He was infamously dubbed "Ten Loss Tubby" by several disgruntled UK fans. Smith's Final Four drought is the longest of any coach in UK history, although Smith did come just a double-overtime loss short of another Final Four appearance in 2005. On March 22, 2007, Smith resigned his position of UK Head Coach to accept the head coach position at the University of Minnesota.

=== Billy Gillispie (2007–2009) ===
On April 6, 2007, Billy Gillispie was formally announced as the new head coach of the University of Kentucky by UK athletic director Mitch Barnhart. He fielded questions from the media during the press conference held at UK's new practice facility, the Joe Craft Center. He expressed his excitement and joy to be not only considered for the position but to have been given the honor and the opportunity to coach what former UK coach Rick Pitino referred to as the "Roman Empire" of college basketball. "I'm very, very grateful and honored to be here, but we have a lot of work to do." Gillispie became only the sixth head coach in the last 76 years at the school.

==== Decline in form (2008–2009) ====
Gillispie's second season again started out rocky in 2008 as the 'Cats fell to Virginia Military Institute in their season opener. The second game of the season saw the Wildcats fall to North Carolina by 19 points. UK rebounded to win 11 of their next 12 games, improving their record to 11–3. On January 4, the Wildcats lost a heart breaker to archrival Louisville 74–71 after a 25 ft. shot by Edgar Sosa with 2.3 seconds remaining in the game. Prior to the shot, UK was down 7 with 38.5 seconds left, and Jodie Meeks was fouled shooting a three, proceeded to make all three free throw shots, Patrick Patterson stole an inbound and passed it to Meeks who laid it in to bring the game to 71–69 with 29.6 left, and then an inbound pass went long and Meeks snatched the pass, drove to the hoop and was fouled, and then made both free throws to tie the game at 71 with 22.9 left. UK and Meeks got seven points in about 15 seconds to tie the game. Kentucky disposed of Vanderbilt to win their SEC opener on January 10, 70–60. On January 13, in a road game against Tennessee, Jodie Meeks set a new Kentucky scoring record by dropping 54 points on the Volunteers. This total bested Dan Issel's 39-year-old scoring record by 1 point, and propelled UK to a 90–72 win and 2–0 start in conference play. Kentucky followed up this effort with a 68–45 victory at Georgia, improving to 14–4 on the season. With wins over Auburn and Alabama, Kentucky moved to 5–0 in the SEC. On January 26, UK was ranked in the AP Poll (24th) for the first time since week 1 of the 2007–08 season. UK promptly dropped 3 in a row (to Ole Miss, South Carolina, and Mississippi State) before rebounding at home with a thrilling 68–65 win over Florida. Jodie Meeks scored 23 points in the contest, including the fade-away contested 3-point basket with less than 5 seconds remaining to seal the win for UK. On Valentine's Day Kentucky handily defeated Arkansas at Bud Walton Arena 79–63 behind another strong performance from Meeks. Meeks contributed 45 points and helped UK win despite the absence of Patrick Patterson (sprained ankle). With the win, UK remained tied with South Carolina and Tennessee for 1st in the SEC East at 7–3. Following the win UK completely collapsed, losing 5 of its last 6 games to finish the regular season 19–12 with an 8–8 SEC record. Entering the SEC tournament many felt UK would need to win the championship game to get into the NCAA tournament, but UK was defeated in the second game vs. LSU. With an unimpressive regular season and quick elimination in the SEC tournament, UK did indeed miss the NCAA tournament for the first time in 18 years and instead received an invitation to the NIT tournament where the team was defeated in the quarterfinal round against Notre Dame.

On March 27, 2009, an 18-minute-long meeting occurred between Billy Gillispie, President Dr. Lee Todd, Jr. and Athletic Director Mitch Barnhart, after which it was announced that Gillispie would not be returning as the head coach the next season. Barnhart stressed the firing was due to more than wins and losses, citing "philosophical differences" and "a clear gap in how the rules and responsibilities overseeing the program are viewed".

=== John Calipari (2009–2024) ===
==== Calipari's first class (2010) ====
On April 1, 2009, John Calipari replaced former head coach Billy Gillispie as the Wildcats head coach. To begin his tenure at the University of Kentucky, John Calipari signed one of the best all time recruiting classes. The class was headlined by four five-star recruits: John Wall, DeMarcus Cousins, Daniel Orton, and Eric Bledsoe. On December 19, 2009, the Wildcats defeated Austin Peay 90–69 extending their record to 11–0, and John Calipari broke Adolph Rupp's record for the most consecutive wins to start a season for a first-year head coach at Kentucky. Kentucky defeated the Drexel Dragons 88–44 on December 21, 2009, to become the first program in college basketball history to claim their 2000th victory. By January 25, 2010, Coach "Cal" had the Kentucky Wildcats ranked No. 1 in both the ESPN/Coaches poll and AP poll with a record of 19–0. Calipari helped raise in excess of $1.5 million to aid the country of Haiti during the aftermath of the 2010 Haiti earthquake. President Barack Obama called the Wildcats to thank them for their relief efforts and wish them luck in their future endeavors. To finish off the 2009–10 regular season, Kentucky won its 44th SEC regular season championship (with a final 14–2 SEC record), and won its 26th SEC tournament championship, beating Mississippi State in the finals. The Wildcats then received a No. 1 seed (their 10th No. 1 seed in history) in the East Regional of the NCAA tournament, where they eventually lost to West Virginia in the Elite Eight. This also marked Kentucky's record 50th NCAA Tournament appearance.

==== Run to the Final Four (2011) ====
In 2011 the Wildcats got off to a good start in the regular season with a record of 12–2, with their only losses being North Carolina away and UConn in the Maui Invitational Finals. Conference play was a different matter, and Kentucky would struggle in the SEC losing 6 out of their 8 away games, all of one were against unranked opponents. To close out the season with a three-game defeat No. 13 Florida, No. 23 Vanderbilt and Tennessee at home for a 22–8 record. The hot streak would continue, and Kentucky would win their 27th SEC Tournament Title. This was enough for No. 4 seed on the East regional where they played Princeton in a very close first-round game that ended in a 59–57 victory for the Cats. Knight, Jones and company would exact their revenge in the second round against West Virginia, who knocked off Kentucky in the 2010 tourney. In the Sweet Sixteen and Elite Eight they would upset the No. 1 seed Ohio State Buckeyes and No. 2 seed North Carolina Tar Heels on their way to the school's 14th Final Four. They lost in the Final Four to eventual National Champion No. 3 seed UConn 56–55.

==== The road to an eighth championship (2012) ====
In the 2011–12 season, Calipari led Kentucky to being 16–0 in SEC regular season play, clinching its 45th SEC regular season championship. The last team to do so in the SEC was the 2002–03 Kentucky Wildcats, and before that, the 1995–96 Kentucky Wildcats. Kentucky's regular season record was 30–1, with its only loss being by one point coming from a 3-pointer buzzer-beater by the Indiana Hoosiers' Christian Watford at Assembly Hall on December 10, 2011. In the SEC Tournament, Kentucky fell to Vanderbilt in the championship game, making its overall record 32–2 going into the NCAA tournament. Kentucky was both selected as the No. 1 seed in the South Region and also the No. 1 seed overall of the entire NCAA Tournament. The Sweet 16 match-up on March 23, 2012, was a rematch against Indiana, in which this time the Wildcats prevailed over the Hoosiers 102–90. On March 25, 2012, Kentucky won the South Regional, setting up a Final Four semifinal with the Louisville Cardinals. Calipari's Wildcats defeated the Cardinals (coached by former Kentucky coach Rick Pitino) by a score of 69–61. This sent Kentucky to the National Championship game against the Kansas Jayhawks, where they defeated Kansas 67–59, winning UK's 8th NCAA championship, along with John Calipari's first NCAA Championship as a head coach. This Kentucky team had a record six players drafted in the 2012 NBA draft, including the first time two teammates have been chosen with the first two picks: Anthony Davis (1st overall), Michael Kidd-Gilchrist (2nd), Terrence Jones (18th), Marquis Teague (29th), Doron Lamb (42nd) and Darius Miller (46th).

==== Starting anew (2013) ====
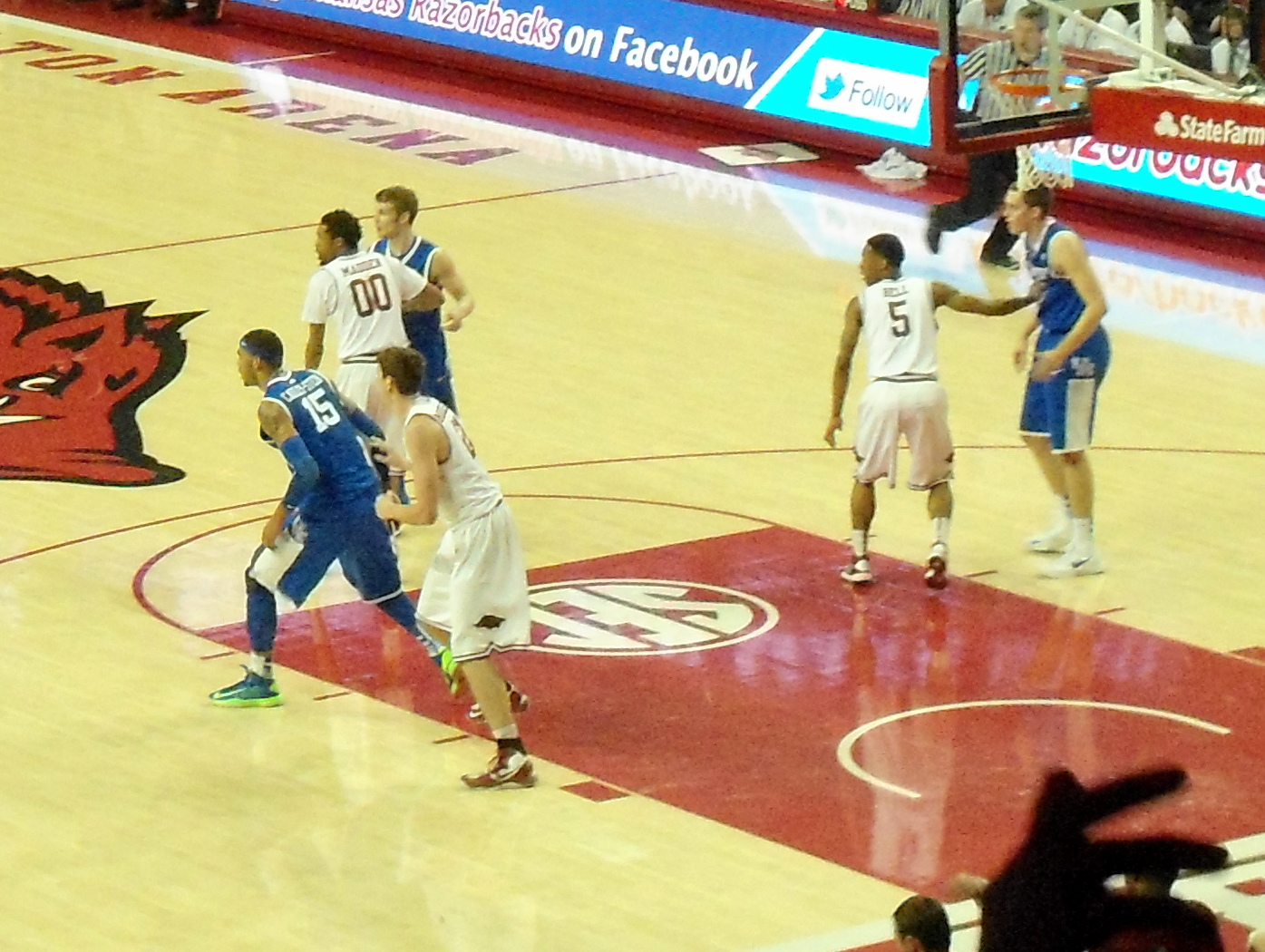
Kentucky v Arkansas game in March 2013

The 2012–13 season's recruiting class ranked either first or second by various recruiting experts led by top center Nerlens Noel, guard Archie Goodwin, forward Alex Poythress, and four-star center Willie Cauley-Stein. Kentucky also brought in transfer guard Julius Mays, a graduate student who had previously played at Wright State University and North Carolina State. Mays was eligible to play immediately, because UK offered a master's degree program that Wright State did not. However, the only returner that saw significant minutes from the championship squad was back-up power forward Kyle Wiltjer, who averaged 11 minutes per game (Ryan Harrow sat out the previous season after transferring from NC State before the 2011–12 season). Although the team saw the rise of Jarrod Polson in the first game of the season against Maryland, they struggled to close out closer games and play with the will to win that Calipari demands. On February 12, Noel tore his ACL in a loss against Florida. UK was 17–7 including that game and went 4–5 the remainder of the season, losing all 5 games away from Rupp Arena. The fourth of those losses was against Vanderbilt in the first round of the SEC tournament, and UK missed the NCAA tournament altogether, being the overall No. 1 seed of the NIT. UK was upset by Robert Morris in the first round of the NIT, ending their season with a 21–12 record.

In the press conference following the loss to Robert Morris, Calipari stated that his 2013–14 team would be a "tough, hard-nosed, fighting team." Noel and Goodwin both entered the NBA draft and were both taken in the first round at 6th and 29th, respectively. Ryan Harrow transferred to Georgia State to be closer to his father that had suffered from a stroke, and Kyle Wiltjer transferred to Gonzaga. Kentucky brought in the No. 1 recruiting class, featuring a record six McDonald's All-Americans in Julius Randle, Andrew Harrison, Aaron Harrison, James Young, Dakari Johnson, and Marcus Lee, as well as Kentucky natives Derek Willis and Dominique Hawkins, and walk-on E. J. Floreal (son of Edrick Floréal, head coach of UK's track and field team). Alex Poythress and Willie Cauley-Stein did not declare for the 2013 NBA draft and decided to return for their sophomore seasons.

==== The Tweakables (2014) ====
In 2013–14, Kentucky looked to make up for its struggles in the previous season. Despite making the NIT, there were high expectations for this team. The team, however, would be without some of its top players from the 2012–13 team including Nerlens Noel and starting shooting guard Archie Goodwin, who were first-round draft choices in the 2013 NBA draft. Starting power forward Kyle Wiltjer transferred to Gonzaga and starting point guard Ryan Harrow transferred to Georgia State. Returning was former McDonald's All-American Alex Poythress and starting center Willie Cauley-Stein. The poor success of the 2012–13 team did not stop John Calipari from again producing another number one recruiting class. The entering class included a record six McDonald's All-Americans highlighted by Julius Randle and the Harrison Twins from Texas, Aaron and Andrew. Many recruiting analysts and experts proclaimed that the 2013 signing class was the greatest recruiting class since the infamous Fab Five in the 1990s.

The team began the season ranked number one in both the AP and Coaches polls. The season was full of ups and downs. Early in the season the team experienced close losses to Baylor, Michigan State, and North Carolina. Despite those losses the team was able to defeat in-state rival Louisville. Nothing changed in SEC play for them either. The team ended the regular season losing three of their last four games including once to South Carolina, who finished the season 14–20 overall. The team limped into the SEC tournament unranked and desperately looking for any answer to their disappointing season. Calipari during his weekly radio call-in show mentioned the team was given a "tweak". The "tweak" sparked speculation and curiosity among the fans and the media to what it could be. The "tweak" was never fully revealed. However, the "tweak" caused the team to go on an historic run through both the SEC and NCAA tournaments. UK was the runner-up to number one Florida in the SEC Tournament. During the NCAA tournament UK became the first team in history to eliminate three teams from the previous Final Four (Wichita State, Louisville, Michigan). UK was the National Runner-up after losing to Connecticut in the national championship game.

==== Pursuit of perfection (2015) ====
After the 2014 season, Kentucky only lost Julius Randle and James Young to the NBA draft. The returning players consisted of a record-tying nine McDonald's All-Americans. Juniors Cauley-Stein and Poythress returned with sophomores Aaron and Andrew Harrison, Johnson, and Lee to join the No. 2 ranked 2015 recruiting class which was highlighted of Gatorade Player of the Year Karl-Anthony Towns for the 2015 season. The team began its season in the Bahamas on a six-game tour against international clubs and teams. While in the Bahamas the team established a "platoon system" which featured two groups of five players that would rotate every four minutes within the game. The "platoon system" was put on display nationally in a 72–40 victory over No. 5 Kansas in the Champions Classic in November. In December, the team defeated UCLA 83–44. Kentucky led 41–7 at halftime, the lowest UCLA point total for a half in its storied history. The SEC regular season began with two overtime victories over Ole Miss and Texas A&M, the closest games Kentucky would play all season. Kentucky finished the regular season with a perfect 31–0 record, the best start in school history. In the SEC tournament, the team won each game by double digits, including a 78–63 victory over Arkansas in the finals. Cauley-Stein was named the MVP of the Tournament. In the NCAA tournament Kentucky played its first two games at the KFC Yum! Center in Louisville. Prior to the regional semifinal against West Virginia, Mountaineers guard Daxter Miles proclaimed that Kentucky would be 36–1 after the game. The comment fueled the team as they defeated West Virginia 78–39, tying the largest margin of victory in the Sweet 16 in NCAA Tournament history. In the regional final Kentucky narrowly defeated Notre Dame 68–66. The only loss of the season was in the Final Four to Wisconsin, who Kentucky defeated the previous season in the Final Four. The 2014–15 team tied the NCAA record for most wins in a season (38). After the season Cauley-Stein and Towns were named consensus All-Americans among other awards received.

==== 2023 ====
The Kentucky Wildcats represented USA Basketball, at Globl Jam 2023, and defeated Canada to win the gold medal.

==== 2024 ====
Following a first round upset as a 3 seed in the 2024 NCAA Tournament, John Calipari resigned his position of Head Coach to accept the same role at the University of Arkansas. He was officially announced as the Razorbacks Head Coach on April 10, 2024, marking the end of his storied tenure at Kentucky.

=== Mark Pope (2024–present) ===
On April 12, 2024, Kentucky hired BYU head coach Mark Pope for the same position in Lexington, days after Calipari left for the vacant head coaching post at Arkansas. Pope was a member of the Wildcats' 1995-1996 team that won the NCAA Tournament.

Kentucky finished the 2024–25 season with a 24–12 overall record with key wins over Gonzaga, Duke in the Champions Classic, and with wins over rivals Louisville, Florida, and sweeping the regular season series against Tennessee. Major losses include Ohio State in the CBS Sports Classic, Arkansas in John Calipari's return to Lexington, and Tennessee in the NCAA Tournament Sweet 16.

== Coaches ==
The Wildcats have had 23 coaches in their 112-year history. Mark Pope is the current head coach. Six Wildcats coaches have won the National Coach-of-the-Year award: Adolph Rupp in 1950, 1954, 1959, 1966, and 1970, Joe B. Hall in 1978, Eddie Sutton in 1986, Rick Pitino in 1990 and 1992, Tubby Smith in 1998, 2003, and 2005, and John Calipari in 2012 and 2015. Additionally, seven Wildcats coaches have been named Southeastern Conference Coach-of-the-Year: Adolph Rupp in 1964, 1966, 1968, 1969, 1970, 1971 and 1972, Joe B. Hall in 1973, 1975, 1978 and 1983, Eddie Sutton in 1986, Rick Pitino in 1990, 1991 and 1996, Tubby Smith in 1998, 2003, and 2005, Billy Gillispie in 2008, and John Calipari in 2010, 2012, and 2015.

== Rivalries ==
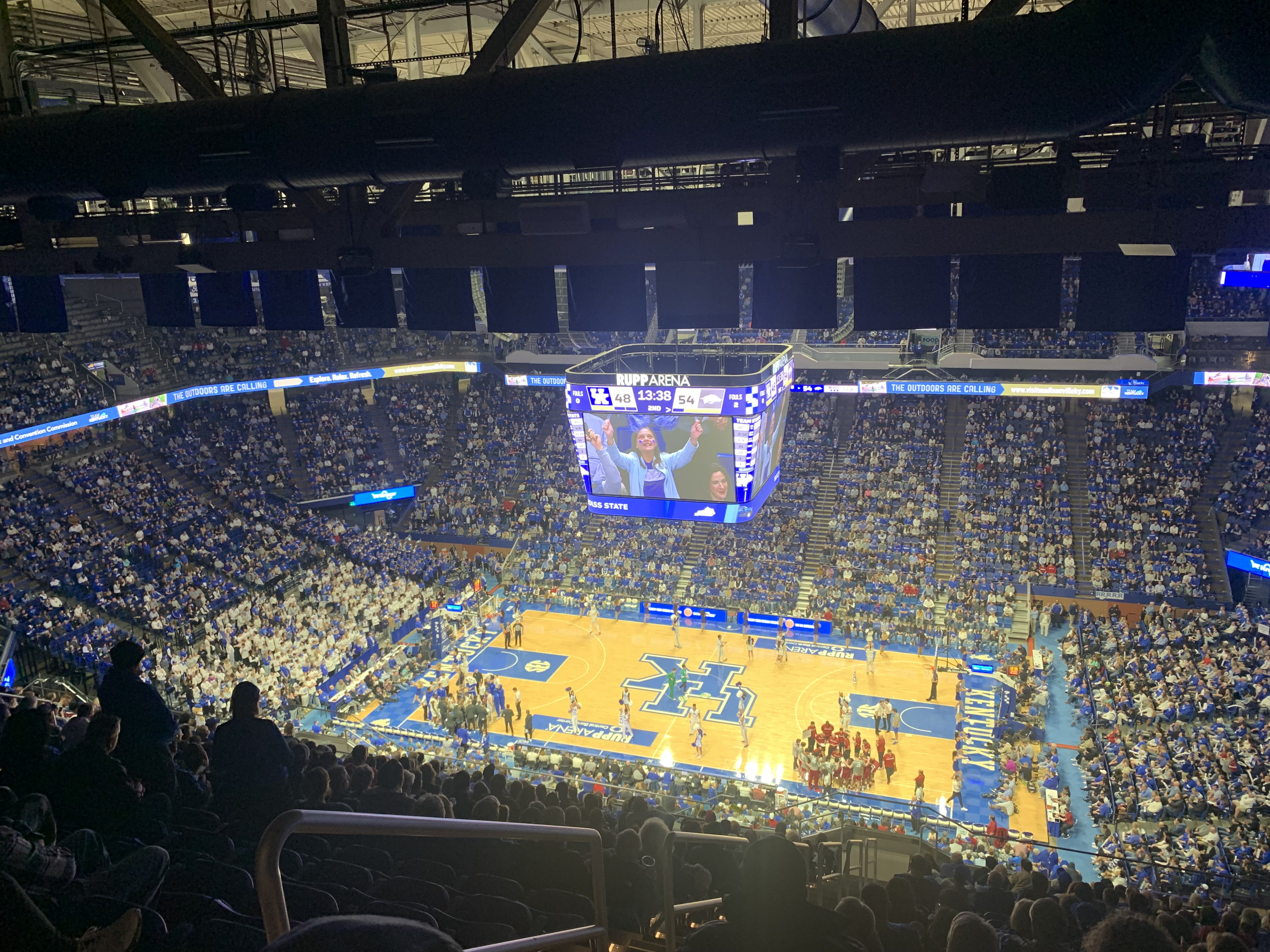
Kentucky playing Rival Arkansas in 2023

The Kentucky Wildcats have numerous rivalries with various other College Basketball programs.

=== Conference ===
- Arkansas
- Florida
- Tennessee

=== Non-Conference Rivals ===
- Duke
- Indiana
- Louisville
- North Carolina

=== Historic/Defunct Rivalries ===
- Centre College
- Transylvania University

== Postseason results ==
Kentucky has appeared in the NCAA tournament 63 times; they first appeared in the 1942 edition and last appeared in 2026. They have a record of 134–57.

=== Final Four appearances ===
Kentucky has appeared in the Final Four 17 times, including four finishes as the runner-up and eight national championships.

Year	Result	Final Opponent	Score	Coach	Record
1942	Semifinalist	Dartmouth	28–47	Adolph Rupp	19–6
1948	Champion	Baylor	58–42	Adolph Rupp	36–3
1949	Champion	Oklahoma State	46–36	Adolph Rupp	32–2
1951	Champion	Kansas State	68–58	Adolph Rupp	32–2
1958	Champion	Seattle	84–72	Adolph Rupp	23–6
1966	Runner-Up	Texas Western	65–72	Adolph Rupp	27–2
1975	Runner-Up	UCLA	85–92	Joe B. Hall	15–3
1978	Champion	Duke	94–88	Joe B. Hall	30–2
1984	Semifinalist	Georgetown	40–53	Joe B. Hall	29–5
1993	Semifinalist	Michigan	78–81 ^{OT}	Rick Pitino	30–4
1996	Champion	Syracuse	76–67	Rick Pitino	34–2
1997	Runner-Up	Arizona	79–84 ^{OT}	Rick Pitino	35–3
1998	Champion	Utah	78–69	Tubby Smith	35–4
2011	Semifinalist	UConn	55–56	John Calipari	29–9
2012	Champion	Kansas	67–59	John Calipari	38–2
2014	Runner-Up	UConn	54–60	John Calipari	29–11
2015	Semifinalist	Wisconsin	64–71	John Calipari	38–1

=== NCAA Tournament seeding history ===
Full seeding began with the 1979 edition.

Years →	'80	'81	'82	'83	'84	'85	'86	'87	'88	'92	'93	'94	'95	'96	'97	'98	'99	'00	'01
Seeds →	1	2	6	3	1	12	1	8	2	2	1	3	1	1	1	2	3	5	2

Years →	'02	'03	'04	'05	'06	'07	'08	'10	'11	'12	'14	'15	'16	'17	'18	'19	'22	'23	'24
Seeds →	4	1	1*	2	8	8	11	1	4	1*	8	1*	4	2	5	2	2	6	3

Years →	'25	'26
Seeds →	3	7

The * represents overall number one seed which began with the 2004 Tournament.

== Honorees ==
Kentucky has 45 men's basketball players, coaches, and contributors honored in Rupp Arena with banners hung from the rafters featuring a jersey and their number. Before 1991, jersey retirements were a rare honor at Kentucky. The first to receive the honor was Layton Rouse, whose jersey was retired at the end of the 1940 season. The "Fabulous Five" was honored after their back-to-back championships in 1948 and 1949, with coach Adolph Rupp declaring no player would wear their numbers at Kentucky. Five years later, the entire 1953–54 team was honored with retired numbers after their undefeated season (they were later declared national champions by the Helms Foundation). One player from the team, Linville Puckett, was to be honored after graduation in 1956 but quit the team in 1955 and Rupp revoked the honor. Due to "unretiring" Puckett's number, and the point-shaving scandal that embroiled some of the Fabulous Five leading to the cancelled 1952–53 season, Rupp stopped honoring players with retired numbers. As a result of an NCAA rule in effect from 1957 to 2023 restricting jersey numbers to the digits 0 to 5, Kentucky began allowing players to wear the previously retired numbers.

In 1990, under the leadership of new athletic director C. M. Newton, Kentucky began again to honor players from the past, although the honor was a "retired jersey" hung from the rafters and all numbers would remain available for future players. At that time, jerseys for all the previously honored players were hung in the rafters of Rupp Arena for the first time and former coaches Adolph Rupp and Joe B. Hall were honored with banners as well. Ten days after losing in the 1992 East Regional Finals to Duke, Kentucky's four seniors, named the "Unforgettables", were honored with jersey retirement for their commitment to the program and helping lead it out of NCAA probation. This would be the final time players were honored with jersey retirement while still students. To be honored today, the individual must first be elected to the UK Athletics Hall of Fame, which they are eligible for starting ten years after their final contributing year. Five years after being elected, they can be considered for jersey retirement.

The last player and last contributor to be honored is Mike Pratt, who was honored on February 4, 2023, with a banner denoting both his three years as a player and 20 years as a broadcaster on the UK Radio Network. The last coach to be honored is Tubby Smith, who was honored on December 31, 2021.

=== Honored players ===
Name	Number	Years	Awards and Achievements
Basil Hayden	–	1920–22	1921 All-American
Burgess Carey	56	1925–26	1925 All-American
Carey Spicer	–	1929–31	1929 & 1931 All-American
Forest Sale	19	1931–33	1933 National Champion; 1933 National Player of the Year; 1932 & 1933 All-American
John DeMoisey	7	1932–34	1933 National Champion; 1934 All-American
Layton Rouse	4	1938–40	1940 All-SEC & All-SEC Tournament
Ralph Beard	12	1946–49	1948 & 1949 NCAA Champion; 1946 NIT Champion; 1947, 1948 & 1949 All-American; One of the "Fabulous Five"
Alex Groza	15	1945, 47–49	1948 & 1949 NCAA Champion; 1949 National Player of the Year; 1947, 1948 & 1949 All-American; 1948 & 1949 NCAA Tournament Most Outstanding Player; One of the "Fabulous Five"
Kenny Rollins	26	1943, 47–48	1948 NCAA Champion; One of the "Fabulous Five"
Cliff Barker	22	1947–49	1948 & 1949 NCAA Champion; One of the "Fabulous Five"
Wallace Jones	27	1946–49	1948 & 1949 NCAA Champion; 1946 NIT Champion; 1947 & 1949 All-American; One of the "Fabulous Five"
Bill Spivey	77	1950–51	1951 NCAA Champion; 1951 National Player of the Year; 1951 All-American; 1951 NCAA Tournament Most Outstanding Player
Cliff Hagan	6	1951–52, 54	1951 NCAA Champion; 1954 Undefeated Season; 1952 & 1954 All-American
Frank Ramsey	30	1951–52, 54	1951 NCAA Champion; 1954 Undefeated Season; 1951, 1952 & 1954 All-American
Lou Tsioropoulos	16	1951–52, 54	1951 NCAA Champion; 1954 Undefeated Season
William Evans	42	1952, 54–55	1954 Undefeated Season
Gayle Rose	20	1952, 54–55	1954 Undefeated Season
Jerry Bird	22	1954–56	1954 Undefeated Season
Phil Grawemeyer	44	1954–56	1954 Undefeated Season
Bob Burrow	50	1955–56	1955 & 1956 All-American
Vernon Hatton	52	1956–58	1958 NCAA Champion; 1958 All-American; 1958 All-Final Four
Johnny Cox	24	1957–59	1958 NCAA Champion; 1959 All-American; 1958 All-Final Four
Cotton Nash	44	1962–64	1962, 1963 & 1964 All-American
Louie Dampier	10	1965–67	1966 & 1967 All-American; 1966 All-Final Four
Pat Riley	42	1965–67	1966 SEC Player of the Year; 1966 All-American; 1966 All-Final Four
Mike Pratt	22	1968–70	1970 All-American
Dan Issel	44	1968–70	1969 & 1970 All-American; Kentucky All-Time Scoring Leader
Kevin Grevey	35	1973–75	1973 SEC Player of the Year; 1975 All-American; 1975 All-Final Four
Jack Givens	21	1975–78	1978 NCAA Champion; 1976 NIT Champion; 1978 National Player of the Year; 1976 & 1978 All-American; 1978 NCAA Tournament Most Outstanding Player
Rick Robey	53	1975–78	1978 NCAA Champion; 1976 NIT Champion; 1977 & 1978 All-American; 1978 All-Final Four
Kyle Macy	4	1978–80	1978 NCAA Champion; 1980 SEC Player of the Year; 1979 & 1980 All-American; 1978 NCAA Tournament Mideast Region MOP; 1979 SEC Tournament MVP
Sam Bowie	31	1980–81, 84	1981 & 1984 All-American
Kenny Walker	34	1983–86	1985 SEC Player of the Year; 1985 & 1986 All-American
Sean Woods	11	1990–92	One of the "Unforgettables"
Deron Feldhaus	12	1989–92	One of the "Unforgettables"
John Pelphrey	34	1989–92	One of the "Unforgettables"
Richie Farmer	32	1989–92	One of the "Unforgettables"
Jamal Mashburn	24	1991–93	1993 SEC Player of the Year; 1992 & 1993 All-American; 1993 All-Final Four; 1992 SEC Tournament MVP
Tony Delk	00	1993–96	1996 NCAA Champion; 1996 SEC Player of the Year; 1996 All-American; 1996 NCAA Tournament Most Outstanding Player

=== Honored coaches ===
Names	Years	Awards and Achievements
Adolph Rupp	1930–72	1948, 1949, 1951, 1958 NCAA Championship head coach, 1946 NIT Championship head coach, 7x SEC Coach of the Year, Naismith Hall of Fame Class of 1969
Joe B. Hall	1972–85	1978 NCAA Championship head coach, 1975 NIT Championship head coach, 4x SEC Coach of the Year
Rick Pitino	1989–97	1996 NCAA Championship head coach, 3x SEC Coach of the Year, Naismith Hall of Fame Class of 2013
Tubby Smith	1997–2007	1998 NCAA Championship head coach, 3x SEC Coach of the Year

=== Honored contributors ===
Name	Years	Notes
Bill Keightley	1962–2008	Equipment Manager, "Mr. Wildcat"
Cawood Ledford	1953–92	"Voice of the Wildcats"
Mike Pratt	2002–22	Broadcaster

== All-Time statistical leaders ==
Points
Name	Years	Points
Dan Issel	1967–1970	2,138
Kenny Walker	1982–1986	2,080
Jack Givens	1975–1978	2,038
Keith Bogans	1999–2003	1,923
Tony Delk	1992–1996	1,890
Jamal Mashburn	1990–1993	1,843
Kevin Grevey	1972–1975	1,801
Tayshaun Prince	1998–2002	1,775
Cotton Nash	1961–1964	1,770
Alex Groza	1945–1949	1,744

Rebounds
Name	Years	Rebounds
Dan Issel	1967–1970	1,078
Frank Ramsey	1950–1954	1,038
Cliff Hagan	1950–1954	1,035
Johnny Cox	1956–1959	1,004
Cotton Nash	1961–1964	962
Kenny Walker	1982–1986	942
Chuck Hayes	2001–2005	910
Sam Bowie	1979–1984	843
Rick Robey	1974–1978	838
Bob Burrow	1954–1956	823

Assists
Name	Years	Assists
Dirk Minniefield	1979–1983	646
Anthony Epps	1993–1997	544
Roger Harden	1982–1986	498
Wayne Turner	1995–1999	494
Sean Woods	1988–1992	482
Kyle Macy	1976–1980	470
Cliff Hawkins	2000–2004	468
Ed Davender	1984–1988	436
Travis Ford	1990–1994	428
Tyler Ulis	2014–2016	381

Steals
Name	Years	Steals
Wayne Turner	1995–1999	238
Tony Delk	1992–1996	201
Cliff Hawkins	2000–2004	199
Ed Davender	1984–1988	191
Jared Prickett	1992–1997	187
Anthony Epps	1993–1997	184
John Pelphrey	1988–1992	173
Chuck Hayes	2001–2005	169
Rodrick Rhodes	1992–1995	163
Rajon Rondo	2004–2006	156
Dirk Minniefield	1979–1983	156

Blocked Shots
Name	Years	Blocks
Jamaal Magloire	1996–2000	268
Willie Cauley-Stein	2012–2015	233
Melvin Turpin	1980–1984	226
Sam Bowie	1979–1984	218
Andre Riddick	1991–1995	212
Anthony Davis	2011–2012	186
Perry Stevenson	2006–2010	160
Souleymane Camara	1998–2003	155
Patrick Patterson	2007–2010	152
Tayshaun Prince	1998–2002	142

Games Played
Name	Years	Games
Darius Miller	2008–2012	152
Wayne Turner	1995–1999	151
Jamaal Magloire	1996–2000	145
Jared Prickett	1992–1997	143
Saul Smith	1997–2001	143
Anthony Epps	1993–1997	141
Ralph Beard	1945–1949	139
Jeff Sheppard	1993–1998	139
Keith Bogans	1999–2003	135
Jim Line	1946–1950	135
Tayshaun Prince	1998–2002	135

== Awards ==
National Coach of the Year

- Adolph Rupp – 1950, 1954, 1959, 1966, 1970
- Joe B. Hall – 1978
- Eddie Sutton – 1986
- Rick Pitino – 1990, 1991
- Tubby Smith – 1998, 2003, 2005
- John Calipari – 2010, 2015

SEC Coach of the Year

- Adolph Rupp – 1964, 1966, 1968, 1969, 1970, 1971, 1972
- Joe B. Hall – 1973, 1975, 1978, 1983
- Eddie Sutton – 1986
- Rick Pitino – 1990, 1991, 1996
- Tubby Smith – 1998, 2003, 2005
- Billy Gillispie – 2008
- John Calipari – 2010, 2012, 2015, 2020

National Player of the Year

- Forest Sale – 1933
- Leroy Edwards – 1935
- John Wall – 2010
- Anthony Davis – 2012
- Oscar Tshiebwe - 2022

SEC Player of the Year

- Pat Riley – 1966
- Tom Parker – 1972
- Kevin Grevey – 1973, 1975
- Kyle Macy – 1980
- Kenny Walker – 1985, 1986
- Jamal Mashburn – 1993
- Tony Delk – 1996
- Ron Mercer – 1997
- Tayshaun Prince – 2001
- Keith Bogans – 2003
- John Wall – 2010
- Anthony Davis – 2012
- Tyler Ulis – 2016
- Malik Monk – 2017
- Immanuel Quickley - 2020
- Oscar Tshiebwe - 2022

National Freshman of the Year

- John Wall – 2010
- Anthony Davis – 2012
- Reed Sheppard – 2024

SEC Rookie of the Year

- Patrick Patterson – 2008
- DeMarcus Cousins – 2010
- Terrence Jones – 2011
- Anthony Davis – 2012
- Nerlens Noel – 2013
- Julius Randle – 2014
- Karl-Anthony Towns – 2015
- Malik Monk – 2017
- Kevin Knox II - 2018
- Reed Sheppard - 2024

NCAA Tournament MOPs

- Alex Groza – 1948, 1949
- Jack Givens – 1978
- Tony Delk – 1996
- Jeff Sheppard – 1998
- Anthony Davis – 2012

SEC Tournament MVPs

- Kyle Macy – 1979
- Dirk Minniefield – 1982
- Rex Chapman – 1988
- Jamal Mashburn – 1992
- Travis Ford – 1993, 1994
- Antoine Walker – 1995
- Ron Mercer – 1997
- Wayne Turner – 1998
- Scott Padgett – 1999
- Tayshaun Prince – 2001
- Keith Bogans – 2003
- Gerald Fitch – 2004
- John Wall – 2010
- Darius Miller – 2011
- Willie Cauley-Stein – 2015
- Tyler Ulis – 2016
- De'Aaron Fox – 2017
- Shai Gilgeous-Alexander - 2018

=== Naismith Hall of Fame Members ===
The following Kentucky players, coaches, and contributors have been enshrined in the Naismith Memorial Basketball Hall of Fame.

Year Inducted	Name	Position	Years at Kentucky
1969	Adolph Rupp	Head coach	1930–1972
1978	Cliff Hagan	Player, Administrator	1950–1954; 1975–1989
1982	Frank Ramsey	Player	1950–1953
1993	Dan Issel	Player	1967–1970
2000	C.M. Newton	Player, Administrator	1949–1951; 1989–2000
2008	Pat Riley	Player	1964–1967
2013	Rick Pitino	Head coach	1989–1997
2015	John Calipari	Head coach	2009–2024
2015	Louie Dampier	Player	1964–1967
2020	Eddie Sutton	Head coach	1985–1989
2025	Billy Donovan	Assistant Coach	1989–1994

Additionally, players Adrian Smith and Tayshaun Prince have been inducted into the Hall of Fame as parts of honored Olympic teams.

=== Olympians ===
The following Kentucky players and coaches have represented their country in basketball in the Summer Olympic Games:

Year	Player/Coach	Country	Location	Medal
1948	Cliff Barker	United States	London	Gold
1948	Ralph Beard	United States	London	Gold
1948	Alex Groza	United States	London	Gold
1948	Wah Wah Jones	United States	London	Gold
1948	Ken Rollins	United States	London	Gold
1948	Adolph Rupp (asst. coach)	United States	London	Gold
1956	Billy Evans	United States	Melbourne	Gold
1960	Adrian Smith	United States	Rome	Gold
2000	Tubby Smith (asst. coach)	United States	Sydney	Gold
2008	Tayshaun Prince	United States	Beijing	Gold
2012	Anthony Davis	United States	London	Gold
2016	DeMarcus Cousins	United States	Rio de Janeiro	Gold
2020	Bam Adebayo	United States	Tokyo	Gold
2020	Devin Booker	United States	Tokyo	Gold
2020	Keldon Johnson	United States	Tokyo	Gold
2024	Bam Adebayo	United States	Paris	Gold
2024	Devin Booker	United States	Paris	Gold
2024	Anthony Davis	United States	Paris	Gold
2024	Shai Gilgeous-Alexander	Canada	Paris	–
2024	Trey Lyles	Canada	Paris	–
2024	Jamal Murray	Canada	Paris	–
2024	Wenyen Gabriel	South Sudan	Paris	–

== Wildcats in the NBA ==
Kentucky has had 145 players selected in the history of the NBA draft, of which 62 have been selected in the first round. Three players have been selected as the number one pick: John Wall, Anthony Davis, and Karl-Anthony Towns. Since 2004 when the NBA expanded to its current size, 25 players have been Lottery Picks in the first fourteen selections of the first round. Five players were selected in the first round of the 2010 Draft, a record for the number of players drafted in the first round from the same school. One player was selected in the American Basketball Association Draft and not selected in the NBA Draft; all other Kentucky players selected in the ABA draft were also selected in the NBA Draft.

Active Wildcats in the NBA
Position	Name	Height	Weight (lbs.)	Hometown	Draft Year	Pick	All-Star Selections	NBA Championships	NBA Team
F	Bam Adebayo	6'10"	255	Little Washington, North Carolina	2017	14th	3 (2020, 2023, 2024)	0	Miami
G	Koby Brea	6'6"	203	New York, New York	2025	41st	0	0	Phoenix
G	Devin Booker	6'6"	206	Moss Point, Mississippi	2015	13th	4 (2020, 2021, 2022, 2024)	0	Phoenix
C	Anthony Davis	6'10"	253	Chicago, Illinois	2012	1st	10 (2014, 2015, 2016, 2017, 2018, 2019, 2020, 2021, 2024, 2025)	1 (2020)	Washington
G	Rob Dillingham	6'3"	175	Hickory, North Carolina	2024	8th	0	0	Chicago
F	Justin Edwards	6'7"	203	Philadelphia, Pennsylvania	2024	UDFA	0	0	Philadelphia
G	De'Aaron Fox	6’3"	175	Houston, Texas	2017	5th	2 (2023, 2026)	0	San Antonio
G	Shai Gilgeous-Alexander	6’6"	180	Hamilton, Ontario	2018	10th	4 (2023, 2024, 2025, 2026)	1 (2025)	Oklahoma City
G	Tyler Herro	6'5"	195	Milwaukee, Wisconsin	2019	13th	1 (2025)	0	Miami
C	Isaiah Jackson	6'10"	206	Pontiac, Michigan	2021	22nd	0	0	L.A. Clippers
F	Keldon Johnson	6'6"	211	Chesterfield, Virginia	2019	29th	0	0	San Antonio
F	Chris Livingston	6'6"	220	Akron, Ohio	2023	58th	0	0	Cleveland
G	Tyrese Maxey	6’2"	200	Dallas, Texas	2020	21st	2 (2024, 2026)	0	Philadelphia
G	Malik Monk	6'3"	200	Lepanto, Arkansas	2017	11th	0	0	Sacramento
G	Jamal Murray	6'4"	207	Kitchener, Ontario	2016	7th	1	1 (2023)	Denver
G	Immanuel Quickley	6’3"	190	Havre de Grace, Maryland	2020	25th	0	0	Toronto
F	Julius Randle	6'9"	240	Dallas, Texas	2014	7th	3 (2021, 2023, 2024)	0	Minnesota
G	Antonio Reeves	6'5"	205	Chicago, Illinois	2024	47th	0	0	Charlotte
F	Nick Richards	7'0"	245	Kingston, Jamaica	2020	42nd	0	0	Chicago
G	Shaedon Sharpe	6'6"	200	London, Ontario	2022	7th	0	0	Portland
G	Reed Sheppard	6'2"	185	London, Kentucky	2024	3rd	0	0	Houston
F	Jacob Toppin	6'8"	200	Ossining, New York	2023	UDFA	0	0	Atlanta
C	Karl-Anthony Towns	7'0"	250	Metuchen, New Jersey	2015	1st	6 (2018, 2019, 2022, 2024, 2025, 2026)	1 (2026)	New York
F	Oscar Tshiebwe	6'9"	255	Lubumbashi, Congo	2023	UDFA	0	0	Utah
F	Jarred Vanderbilt	6'8"	214	Houston, Texas	2018	41st	0	0	L.A. Lakers
G	Cason Wallace	6'3"	195	Dallas, Texas	2023	10th	0	1 (2025)	Oklahoma City
F	P. J. Washington	6'8"	228	Henderson, Nevada	2019	12th	0	0	Dallas
G	TyTy Washington Jr.	6'3"	195	Phoenix, Arizona	2022	29th	0	0	L.A. Clippers
C	Amari Williams	6'10"	262	Nottingham, United Kingdom	2025	46th	0	0	Boston

== Facilities ==
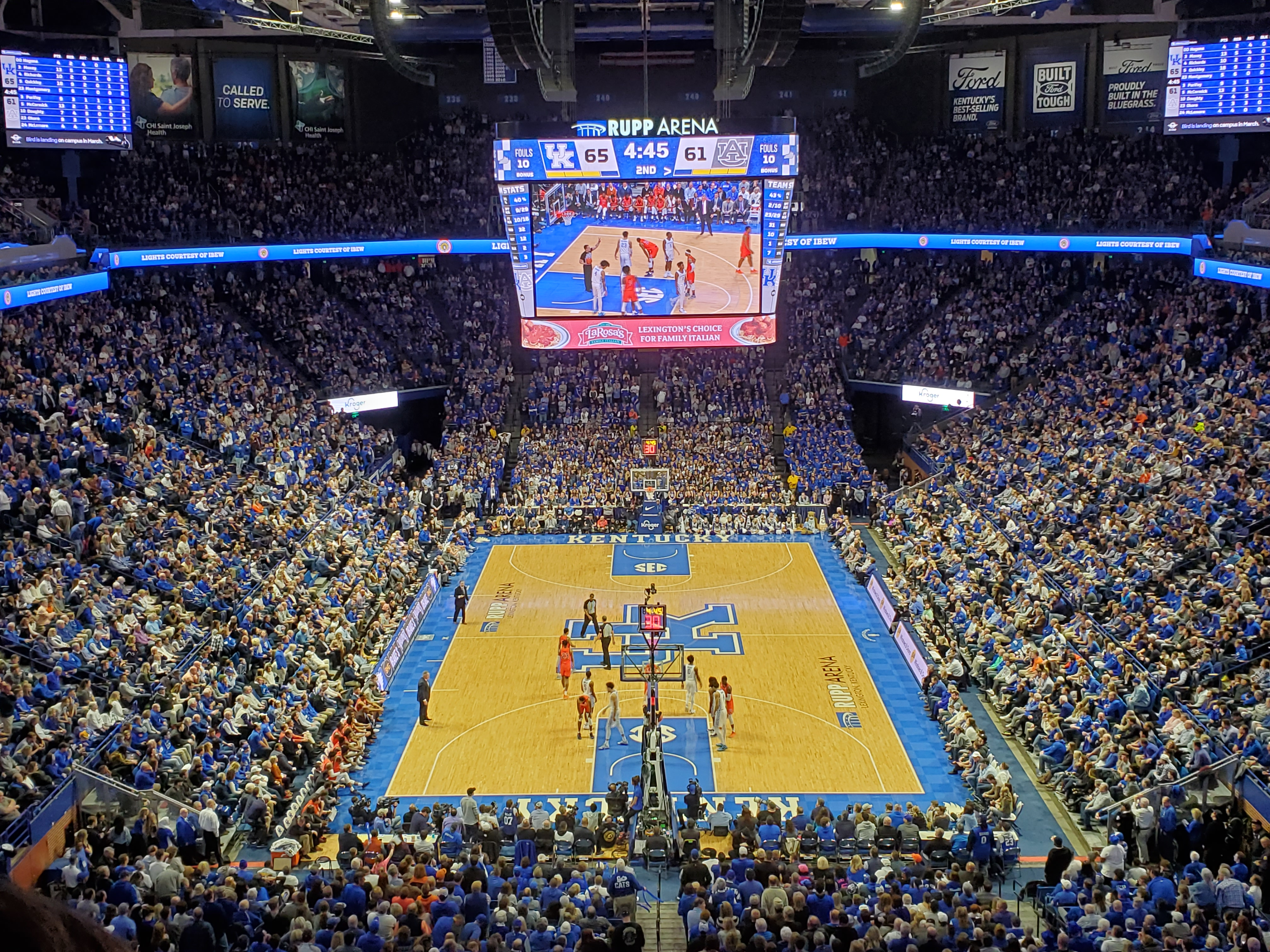
Rupp Arena in 2020

=== Rupp Arena (1976–present) ===
The Kentucky Wildcats presently play their home games in 20,545-seat Rupp Arena. When it opened in 1976, it was the largest arena in the United States built specifically for basketball, and retained that status for much of the following 40-plus years. It was opened in 1976 and is named after legendary Kentucky head coach Adolph Rupp. Located off-campus, in downtown Lexington, the facility's official capacity was 23,500+ until a renovation project in the 2019 offseason reduced the capacity to 20,545. The Wildcats have consistently led the country in home attendance since the 1976–77 season (when Rupp Arena first opened), winning the National Attendance Title a record 25 times, including 17 of the past 20 seasons, and 8 of the last 10 seasons. Kentucky also has an impressive 529–64 (.892) all-time record in Rupp Arena.

=== Joe Craft Center (2007–present) ===
In 2007, the university unveiled the Joe Craft Center, a state-of-the-art basketball practice facility and athletics office building attached to the north side of Memorial Coliseum on the "Avenue of Champions" at the University of Kentucky campus in Lexington, Kentucky. The 102,000 ft^{2} structure contains separate practice courts for the men's and women's basketball programs, separate men's and women's locker rooms, state-of-the-art video rooms for game film viewing, new coaches offices, a ticket office, and athletic administration offices. As a result, Memorial Coliseum has more ample space for volleyball and gymnastics practice and games. The facility is named after businessman and philanthropist Joe Craft, a Hazard, Kentucky native, who pledged $6 million towards the completion of the $30 million project.

=== Memorial Coliseum (1950–76) ===
Coming off back-to-back national championships, the team moved to Memorial Coliseum in 1950. Nicknamed "The House That Rupp Built", the multipurpose facility cost $4 million and seated 12,000 people. It also housed a swimming pool, physical education equipment, and offices for the athletics staff. The team occupied Memorial Coliseum for twenty-six seasons, and sold out all 345 home games they played there during that period. Kentucky also played a 2009 NIT game at Memorial Coliseum due to Rupp Arena being booked. The Wildcats are 307–38 (.890) all-time at Memorial Coliseum. Today, Memorial Coliseum is home to three UK women's teams—basketball, gymnastics, and volleyball.

=== Alumni Gymnasium (1924–50) ===
In 1924, Alumni Gymnasium was completed. It included seating for 2,800 people and cost $92,000 to construct. Kentucky played 271 games at Alumni Gymnasium from 1924 to 1950, going 247–24 (.911). After a major renovation completed in 2018, it is now a student recreation facility known as Alumni Gym Fitness Center.

=== Woodland Park Auditorium (1914–16) ===
Woodland Park Auditorium, opened in 1906 and closed in 1941, was located on the corner of East High Street and Kentucky Avenue in Lexington, Kentucky. Kentucky used this facility for home games during World War I between 1914 and 1916 going 15–7 there all-time.

A 1909 picture of Buell Armory Gymnasium (right side) and Alumni Hall (main building) on the campus of the University of Kentucky.

=== Buell Armory Gymnasium (1910–24) ===
The Wildcats played 84 home games at Buell Armory Gymnasium from 1910 to 1924. It was named for Union Civil War General Don Carlos Buell who was a member of the first board of trustees at Kentucky. The armory was also used during World War I to teach truck maintenance and repair among other skills. Kentucky was 59–25 all-time at Buell Armory Gymnasium.

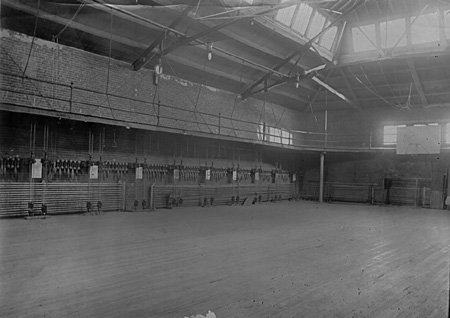
State College Gymnasium "The Gymnasium" first home basketball court used by the Kentucky Wildcats men's basketball team in 1902.

=== State College Gymnasium (1902–14) ===
The first home court for the Wildcats was simply called "The Gymnasium" or State College Gymnasium until 1910. It was located in the north wing of Barker Hall on the university campus. Constructed in 1902, it also housed the university's physical education classes until 1909. The facility had a capacity of 650 people, and with no bleachers or seats, fans had to stand to watch the games that were played there. By the 1920s, it had become clear that "The Gymnasium" (by then renamed "The Ladies' Gym") was inadequate to house the university's basketball team. Records show Kentucky was 17–14 at State College Gymnasium.

== Controversies and scandals ==
=== Compliance issues, violations, and reforms ===
The University of Kentucky's athletics programs have faced multiple NCAA sanctions over several decades, including penalties in 1953, 1964, 1976, 1988–1989, and 2002, reflecting recurring compliance challenges in the basketball program.

In men's basketball, a major case in 1989 involved recruiting violations and academic fraud. Improper benefits, including cash payments to prospective player Chris Mills, and academic assistance provided to Eric Manuel resulted in a three-year probation, a two-year postseason ban, and the vacating of 94 wins from 1987 to 1989. Earlier, in 1976, the program was placed on probation for additional recruiting and eligibility violations.

One of the most significant scandals in the university's history was the 1951 point-shaving scandal, in which several basketball players were implicated in gambling-related manipulation of game outcomes. The incident led to player suspensions and the cancellation of the 1952–53 season.

The 1989 basketball scandal further damaged the program's reputation, exposing systemic recruiting violations and improper benefits under head coach Eddie Sutton.

== See also ==
- NCAA Division I men's basketball tournament consecutive appearances
- Florida–Kentucky men's basketball rivalry
