= Columbia Lions men's basketball =

Men's college basketball team

Columbia Lions
2025–26 Columbia Lions men's basketball team
- University: Columbia University
- Head coach: Kevin Hovde (1st season)
- Arena: Levien Gymnasium (capacity: 2,500)
- Conference: Ivy League
- Nickname: Lions
- Colors: Columbia blue and white

NCAA Division I tournament Sweet Sixteen
- 1968

NCAA Division I tournament appearances
- 1948, 1951, 1968

Pre-tournament Helms national champions
- 1904, 1905, 1910

Conference regular-season champions
- 1904, 1905, 1911, 1912, 1914, 1926, 1930, 1931, 1936, 1947, 1948, 1951, 1968

Uniforms
Home	Away

The Columbia Lions basketball team is the basketball team that represents Columbia University in New York City. The school's team currently competes in the Ivy League. The team's last appearance in the NCAA Division I men's basketball tournament was in 1968. The Lions are led by head coach Kevin Hovde. Their home games are held in the Levien Gymnasium.

Columbia began varsity intercollegiate competition in men's basketball in 1901. The Lions have been retroactively designated as national champions for five seasons during the pre-NCAA tournament era (pre-1939), though these claims are not recognized as official titles by the NCAA in the contemporary sense. The Premo-Porretta Power Poll rated Columbia the highest in 1904 and 1905, and the Helms Athletic Foundation listed Columbia as champions for 1904, 1905, and 1910. While the selections from both the Premo-Porretta Power Poll and the Helms Athletic Foundation are unofficial, the Helms champions are listed in the Official NCAA Men's Basketball Records Book for historical reference.

== Coaching History ==
No.	Tenure	Coach	Years	Record	Pct.
1	1906–1916	Harry A. Fisher*	10	101–39	.721
2	1916–1917	Carl Merner	1	6–8	.429
3	1917–1918	John Murray	1	4–9	.308
4	1918–1919	Fred Dawson	1	3–7	.300
5	1919–1920	Bebe Benson	1	4–10	.286
6	1920–1925	Joseph Deering	5	47–40	.540
7	1925–1933	Daniel Meehan	8	94–56	.627
8	1933–1942; 1945–1946	Paul Mooney^	10	101–81	.555
9	1942–1943	Cliff Battles	1	8–8	.500
10	1943–1945	Elmer Ripley	2	16–19	.457
11	1946–1950	Gordon Ridings	4	70–21	.769
12	1950–1958	Lou Rossini*	8	117–81	.591
13	1958–1961	Archie Oldham	3	15–39	.278
14	1960–1961	Kenneth Hunter	1	5–11	.313
15	1961–1974; 1990–1995	Jack Rohan*	18	197–248	.443
16	1974–1978	Tom Penders	4	43–60	.417
17	1978–1984	Buddy Mahar^	6	70–86	.449
18	1984–1987	Wayne Szoke	3	37–41	.474
19	1987–1990	Wally Halas	3	18–60	.231
20	1995–2003	Armond Hill	8	72–141	.338
21	2003–2010	Joe Jones	7	86–108	.443
22	2010–2016	Kyle Smith	6	101–82	.552
23	2016–2025	Jim Engles^	9	71–150	.321
24	2025–present	Kevin Hovde^	1	16–12	.571
Totals		24 coaches	125 seasons	1360–1425	.488
Records updated through end of 2025–26 season Source; *Alum^Promoted from assistant to head coach

== Postseason results ==
=== NCAA tournament results ===
The Lions have appeared in the NCAA tournament three times. Their combined record is 2–4.

Year	Round	Opponent	Result
1948	Regional semifinal Third-place game	Kentucky; Michigan	L 53–76; L 49–66
1951	First round	Illinois	L 71–79
1968	First round Regional semifinal Third-place game	La Salle; Davidson; St. Bonaventure	W 83–69; L 59–61; W 95–75

=== CIT results ===
The Lions have appeared in two CollegeInsider.com Postseason Tournament (CIT). Their combined record is 6–1. They were CIT champions in 2016.

Year	Round	Opponent	Result
2014	First round Second round Quarterfinals	Valparaiso; Eastern Michigan; Yale	W 58–56; W 69–56; L 69–72
2016	First round Quarterfinals; Semifinals; Championship Game	Norfolk State; Ball State; NJIT; UC Irvine	W 86–54; W 69–67; W 80–65; W 73–67
