= 1947–48 Holy Cross Crusaders men's basketball team =

American college basketball season

1947–48 Holy Cross Crusaders men's basketball

NCAA tournament, Third place
- Conference: Independent
- Record: 26–4
- Head coach: Alvin "Doggie" Julian
- Assistant coach: Hop Riopel

The 1947–48 Holy Cross Crusaders men's basketball team represented the College of the Holy Cross (located in Worcester, Massachusetts) in NCAA competition in the 1947–48 season. The Crusaders, behind coach Alvin "Doggie" Julian, George Kaftan, Joe Mullaney and sophomore point guard Bob Cousy, reached the Final Four for the second straight season before losing to Kentucky in the National semifinals. Holy Cross defeated Kansas State in the Third place game.

== Previous season ==
The Crusaders, who played their home games at Boston Garden and the South High Community School in Worcester, Massachusetts, won their first four games of 1946–47, tripped through a three-game losing streak, then finished the year with 23 straight victories.

The team entered the NCAA Division I men's basketball tournament as the last seed in the 8-team tournament. In the first match, Holy Cross defeated the United States Naval Academy in front of a sold-out crowd at Madison Square Garden by a score of 55 to 47. Mullaney led the team in scoring with 18 points, mostly in part to Navy coach Ben Carnevale's decision to have his players back off from Mullaney, who was reputed as being more of a playmaker than a shooter. In the semi-final match, Holy Cross faced the City College of New York (CCNY), coached by Nat Holman, one of the game's earliest innovators. The Crusaders, led by Kaftan's 30-point game, easily defeated the Beavers 60–45. In the championship game, Holy Cross faced the University of Oklahoma, behind coach Bruce Drake, in another sold-out game at Madison Square Garden. Kaftan followed up the semi-final match with 18 points in the title game, leading the Crusaders to a 58–47 victory against the Sooners.

Holy Cross became the first school from the New England area, as well as the state of Massachusetts, to win a national college basketball title. The Crusaders finished the 1947 season with 23 straight wins. Afterward, 35,000 people watched a parade in the team's honor on Holy Cross Day in Worcester. Future NBA legend Cousy was named AP and UP player of the year, and George Kaftan was voted to the all-decade team of the 1940s by the NCAA in 1989.

== Roster ==
1947–48 Holy Cross Crusaders men's basketball team
Players
Coaches

Pos.	#	Name	Height	Weight	Year	Hometown
G		Bob Cousy	6 ft 1 in (1.85 m)	170 lb (77 kg)	So	New York, New York
G		Joe Mullaney	6 ft 0 in (1.83 m)	165 lb (75 kg)	Jr
F		George Kaftan	6 ft 3 in (1.91 m)	190 lb (86 kg)	Jr

Head coach

- Doggie Julian

Assistant coach(es)

Legend

- (C) Team captain
- (S) Suspended
- (I) Ineligible
- (W) Walk-on
- Injured
- Current redshirt

== Schedule and results ==
Date time, TV	Rank^{#}	Opponent^{#}	Result	Record	Site city, state
Regular season
NCAA tournament
Mar 19, 1948*		vs. Michigan; East Regional Semifinal – Elite Eight	W 63–45	25–3	Madison Square Garden; New York, New York
Mar 20, 1948*		vs. Kentucky; National Semifinal	L 52–60	25–4	Madison Square Garden; New York, New York
Mar 23, 1948*		vs. Kansas State; National consolation game	W 60–54	26–4	Madison Square Garden; New York, New York
*Non-conference game. ^{#}Rankings from AP Poll. (#) Tournament seedings in parentheses.
