= Gordon Ridings =

American basketball coach (1907–1958)

George Ridings
Biographical details
- Born: c. 1907
- Died: November 16, 1958 (aged 51)

Playing career

Basketball
- 1967–1929: Oregon

Baseball
- 1925: Oregon
- 1927–1929: Oregon
- Position: Guard (basketball)

Coaching career (HC unless noted)

Basketball
- 1945–1946: Columbia (JV)
- 1946–1950: Columbia

Head coaching record
- Overall: 70–21
- Tournaments: 0–2 (NCAA)

Accomplishments and honors

Championships
- 2 EIBL (1946, 1947)

Awards
- 2× All-PCC Northern Division (1928, 1929)

Gordon Ridings (c. 1907 – November 16, 1958) was an American college basketball player and coach. He served as head basketball coach at Columbia University from 1946 until 1950, when he suffered a heart attack and handed over coaching duties to Lou Rossini. Ridings graduated of University of Oregon in 1929, where he was a two-time All-Pacific Coast Conference Northern Division selection (1928, 1929). Ridings was remembered as one of the first great teachers of defensive basketball. Story has it that Red Auerbach of the Boston Celtics often came to Morningside Heights to learn how to coach defense. Ridings died of a heart attack, on November 16, 1958, at the age of 51.

== Head coaching record ==
Record table
Season	Team	Overall	Conference	Standing	Postseason
Columbia Lions (Eastern Intercollegiate Basketball League) (1946–1950)
1946–47	Columbia	15–5	11–1	1st	
1947–48	Columbia	20–3	11–1	1st	NCAA Regional Fourth Place
1948–49	Columbia	14–6	8–4	T–2nd	
1949–50	Columbia	21–7	9–3	2nd	
Columbia:		70–21 (.769)	39–9 (.813)		
Total:		70–21 (.769)			
National champion Postseason invitational champion Conference regular season champion Conference regular season and conference tournament champion Division regular season champion Division regular season and conference tournament champion Conference tournament champion
