= 1947–48 Baylor Bears basketball team =

American college basketball season

1947–48 Baylor Bears men's basketball

NCAA tournament, Runner-up Southwest Conference champions

National Championship Game, L 42-58 vs. Kentucky
- Conference: Southwest Conference
- Record: 24–8 (11–1 SWC)
- Head coach: Bill Henderson (5th season)
- Home arena: Marrs McLean Gymnasium

1947–48 Southwest Conference men's basketball standings
	Conf.				Overall
Team	W		L	PCT	W		L	PCT
Baylor	11	–	1	.917	24	–	8	.750
Texas	9	–	3	.750	20	–	5	.800
Arkansas	8	–	4	.667	16	–	8	.667
Rice	6	–	6	.500	10	–	14	.417
SMU	5	–	7	.417	13	–	10	.565
Texas A&M	2	–	10	.167	7	–	17	.292
TCU	1	–	11	.083	3	–	20	.130

The 1947–48 Baylor Bears men's basketball team represented the Baylor University as a member of the Southwest Conference (SWC) during the 1947–48 NCAA men's basketball season. Led by 5th-year head coach Bill Henderson, the team played their home games at Marrs McLean Gymnasium in Waco, Texas.

This season marked the first Final Four appearance in program history for the Bears. Baylor would return again in 1950, but then waited another 71 years before winning the national championship in 2021.

== Roster ==
1947–48 Baylor Bears men's basketball team
Players
Coaches

Pos.	#	Name	Height	Weight	Year	Hometown
G		Red Owens	6 ft 3 in (1.91 m)	180 lb (82 kg)	Jr	Houston, Texas
F	14	Bill DeWitt	6 ft 3 in (1.91 m)	—	So
C		Don Heathington	6 ft 3 in (1.91 m)	—	So

Head coach

- Bill Henderson

Assistant coach(es)

Legend

- (C) Team captain
- (S) Suspended
- (I) Ineligible
- (W) Walk-on
- Injured
- Current redshirt

== Schedule and results ==
Date time, TV	Rank^{#}	Opponent^{#}	Result	Record	Site city, state
Non-conference regular season
Dec 8, 1947*		North Texas	W 51–43	1–0	Marrs McLean Gymnasium; Waco, Texas
Dec 9, 1947*		North Texas	W 64–53	2–0	Marrs McLean Gymnasium; Waco, Texas
Dec 12, 1947*		at Wichita	W 52–43	3–0	Wichita, Kansas
Dec 13, 1947*		at Saint Louis	L 38–65	3–1	St. Louis Arena; St. Louis, Missouri
Dec 18, 1947*		at Arizona	L 54–62	3–2	Tucson, Arizona
Dec 19, 1947*		at UCLA	W 45–42	4–2	Men's Gym; Los Angeles, California
Dec 29, 1947*		vs. Wyoming; All-College Basketball Classic	W 36–29	7–3	Oklahoma City, Oklahoma
Dec 30, 1947*		vs. Oklahoma A&M; All-College Basketball Classic	L 21–22	7–4	Oklahoma City, Oklahoma
Dec 31, 1947*		vs. Alabama; All-College Basketball Classic	W 29–24	8–4	Oklahoma City, Oklahoma
Southwest Conference regular season
Jan 10, 1948		at SMU	W 43–42	9–4 (1–0)	Perkins Gymnasium; Dallas, Texas
Jan 13, 1948		Texas A&M	W 57–41	10–4 (2–0)	Marrs McLean Gymnasium; Waco, Texas
Feb 17, 1948		SMU	W 51–49	18–4 (10–0)	Marrs McLean Gymnasium; Waco, Texas
Feb 25, 1948		at Texas	L 28–32	18–5 (10–1)	Gregory Gymnasium; Austin, Texas
Feb 28, 1948		TCU	W 61–47	19–5 (11–1)	Marrs McLean Gymnasium; Waco, Texas
NCAA Division Six Playoffs
Mar 12, 1948*		vs. Arizona	W 65–59	20–5	Dallas, Texas
Mar 13, 1948*		vs. Arizona	W 64–54	21–5	Dallas, Texas
NCAA tournament
Mar 19, 1948*		vs. Washington; Regional Semifinal – Elite Eight	W 64–62	22–5	Municipal Auditorium (9,700); Kansas City, Missouri
Mar 20, 1948*		vs. Kansas State; Regional Final/National semifinal – Final Four	W 60–52	23–5	Municipal Auditorium; Kansas City, Missouri
Mar 23, 1948*		vs. Kentucky; National championship game	L 42–58	23–6	Madison Square Garden; New York, New York
Olympic Basketball Trials
Mar 27, 1948*		at NYU	W 59–57	24–6	Madison Square Garden; New York, New York
Mar 30, 1948*		vs. Kentucky	L 59–77	24–7	Madison Square Garden; New York, New York
Mar 31, 1948*		vs. Denver Nuggets	L 64–73	24–8	Madison Square Garden; New York, New York
*Non-conference game. ^{#}Rankings from AP Poll. (#) Tournament seedings in parentheses.
