= Arkansas–Kentucky men's basketball rivalry =

College basketball rivalry in the United States

Arkansas-Kentucky Basketball Rivalry
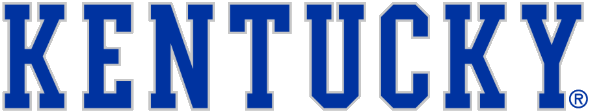
- Arkansas Razorbacks Kentucky Wildcats
- First meeting: December 18, 1945; Kentucky 67-42
- Latest meeting: January 31, 2025; Kentucky 85-77
- Next meeting: 2027 (Next Scheduled Meeting)

Statistics
- Total meetings: 52
- Top scorer: Jodie Meeks (45 Points); February 14, 2009
- All-time record: Kentucky, 37-15
- Postseason results: Kentucky, 10-1 (SEC & NCAA Tournament)
- Largest victory: Kentucky, 76-39; December 13, 1948
- Current win streak: Kentucky, 1 (2026-Present)

The Arkansas–Kentucky men's basketball rivalry is a college basketball rivalry between the University of Arkansas Razorbacks and the University of Kentucky Wildcats. Though mistakenly attributed to Arkansas's hiring of former Kentucky coach John Calipari, this rivalry has been present since Arkansas joined the Southeastern Conference in 1990. Due to Arkansas's relative success in the Southeastern Conference and their lack of a natural in-state rival, Arkansas and Kentucky have formed a rivalry as two of the best teams in the conference. Though only meeting 51 times, 10 of their meetings have been in the SEC Tournament (4 times in the Championship Game) and one of their meetings was in the 1978 Final Four. Since 1992, Kentucky and Arkansas have meet at least once a season.

Kentucky leads the Series 37–15.

== History ==
This Rivalry is in inner-Conference Rivalry in the Southeastern Conference

Arkansas and Kentucky first played in the 1940s. Both teams found success during that time, with both teams making a combined 5 Final Fours. However, until the 1970s, Arkansas and Kentucky only played 3-times (each of which were in the regular season).

In 1978, Kentucky and Arkansas met in the Final Four in St. Louis, Missouri. Kentucky's Jack "Goose" Givens led the scoring for the Wildcats with 23 points as they downed the Razorbacks 64–59. Kentucky would go on to win the National Championship, marking their only championship under Head Coach Joe B. Hall.

While Arkansas and Kentucky played prior to the 1990s, their rivalry truly started when Arkansas joined the SEC in 1990. Arkansas and Kentucky both saw great success throughout the 1990s, in the conference and in the NCAA tournament. Throughout the decade, Arkansas made 6 Sweet Sixteen appearances, 3 Final Four appearances and they won the 1994 National Championship. Additionally, Arkansas was crowned SEC Regular-Season Champions 4 times throughout the 1990s while also winning the SEC Tournament in 1990 and 1991. While Arkansas had most of its success in the early-half of the decade, Kentucky found more success in the latter half. In the 1990s, Kentucky made 7 Sweet Sixteen appearances, 4 final four appearances and they won the 1996 and 1998 National Championships. During this run in the 1990s, Arkansas and Kentucky met 8 times in the regular season (with Arkansas winning 5 of the 8) and 6 times in the SEC Tournament (Kentucky won all 6).

Additional to their on-court battles, Kentucky and Arkansas battled as symbols of the sport during the 1990s. Future legends such as Corliss Williamson, Lee Mayberry, Todd Day, Oliver Miller, Jamal Mashburn, Tony Delk, Ron Mercer, Antoine Walker, Tayshaun Prince, Derek Anderson, Nazr Mohammed, Mark Pope, among many others would play for these two historic schools throughout the decade.

As the 1990s faded into the 2000s, Arkansas would fall from National prominence after the university fired their National Champion head coach Nolan Richardson amidst controversy where Richardson claimed he was being mistreated by the University of Arkansas due to his race. Arkansas would struggle to find consistency, being coached by 4 different coaches (one of which, Dana Altman, was only coach for a single day) during the 2000s. The early 2000s were equally unkind to Kentucky due to several tough seasons for Kentucky Head Coach Tubby Smith and a disastrous 2-year tenure with Coach Billy Gillespie.

Kentucky would return to the national spotlight with the hiring of Head Coach John Calipari in 2009. Calipari would lead the Wildcats to the 2012 National Championship and 6 SEC Tournament Championships. Arkansas too would return to prominence with the hiring of Head Coach Eric Musselman in 2019, though to a lesser extent, only making the Sweet Sixteen 3 times under his leadership. The 2010s ultimately would see a return to competitive play between the two rivals, with Kentucky winning 9–4 during the 2010s. In the 2020s, the two teams are 4–4 in head-to-head matchups. The 2010s and 2020s have been hallmarked by epic battles between the two programs. Throughout the 2010s and 2020s, Arkansas and Kentucky have had 3 games go into overtime, 2 games occur in the SEC Tournament and 3 games occur when both teams were ranked in the Top-25. An additional game of note was the March 2, 2024, matchup where both teams scored 100+ points in regulation as the Wildcats won 111–102.

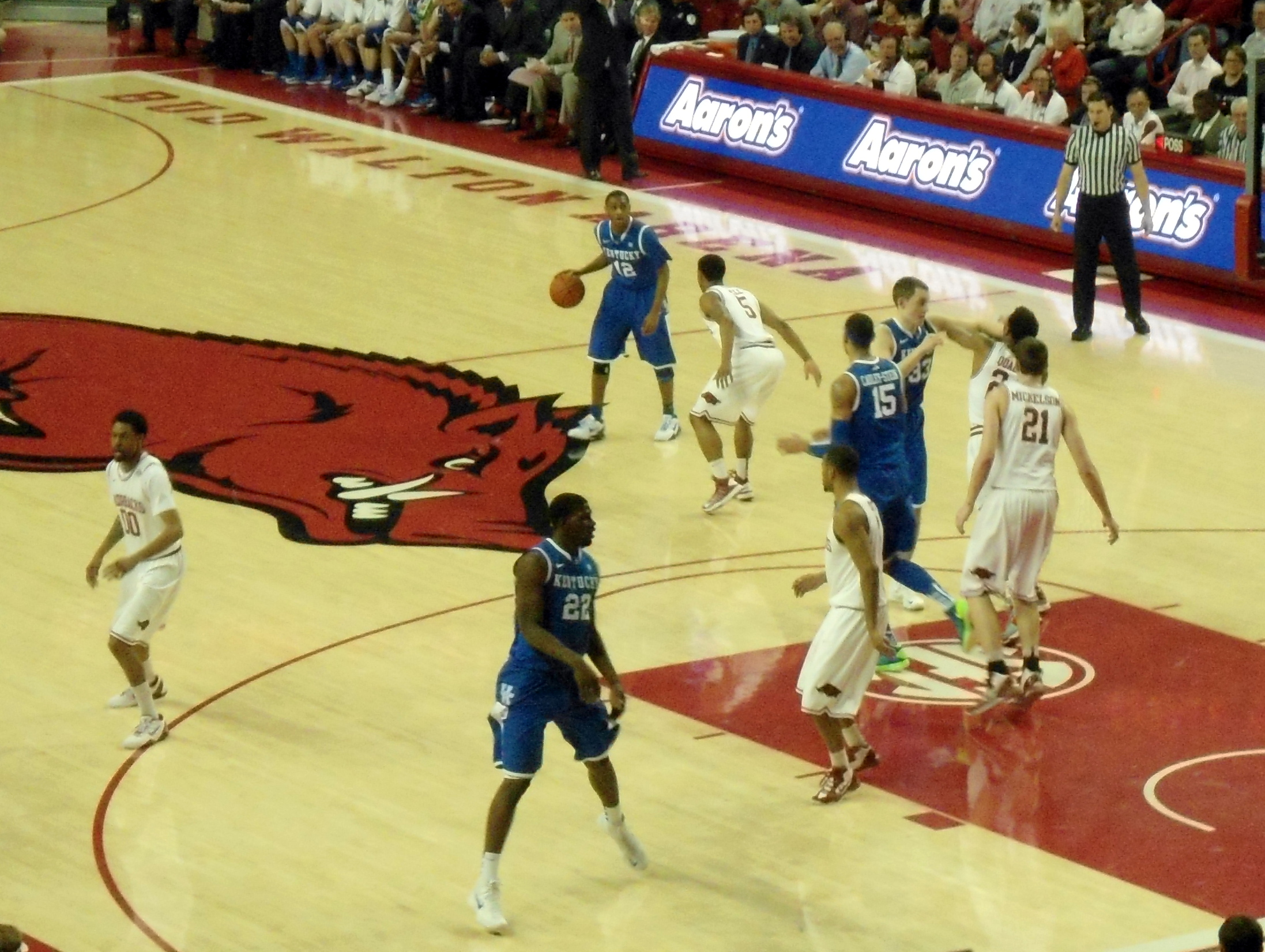
Kentucky vs Arkansas in 2013

In 2024, the University of Arkansas hired former Kentucky Head Coach John Calipari. On April 9, 2024, Calipari announced he would be leaving Kentucky, but did not immediately announce plans to retire or accept another job. The next day, he signed with Arkansas for a 5-year deal worth $7 million a season. Many Kentucky fans were outraged that Calipari would sign with an SEC opponent, reigniting the rivalry between the two. Throughout the 2024–2025 season, Arkansas and Kentucky fans would harass each other incessantly on social media leading up to the February 1, 2025, matchup in Rupp Arena. In his return, Calipari was met with boos from the Kentucky faithful, as he led a team composed mostly of former Kentucky players to a 89–79 win over newly hired Kentucky Head Coach Mark Pope. Tickets for Calipari's return were sold-out, and resale pricing of courtside tickets were as high as $12,000. The website for the student ticket's sale crashed 14 times upon the publishing of student ticket sales for the game. The night prior to the game, the Staff at Rupp Arena forbade students from camping out until midnight. The line of students before the game was so long that Rupp Arena staff had to open the gates an hour earlier than usual, and students attempting to breach the arena gates resulted in police being deployed to reorganize the crowd.

In 2026, the rivalry ascended to new heights. The Wildcats would enact revenge for 2025's loss by beating the 17th ranked Razorbacks in front of a sold-out Bud Walton Arena crowd. During the game, Kentucky and Arkansas would engage in a physical game which resulted in 4 technical fouls (3 of which were assessed to Kentucky within a span of :38) and several off-ball personal fouls. As the game concluded, both Coach Mark Pope and Coach John Calipari entered the court to break up an impeding fight between the two teams. ESPN in-game analyst Fran Fraschilla described the rivalry as "one of the best in the SEC."

== Arkansas and Kentucky overlap ==
Arkansas and Kentucky have significant overlap between coaches and players, more so than most conference rivals.

=== Coaches ===
Arkansas and Kentucky shared two hall-of-fame head coaches: Eddie Sutton and John Calipari.

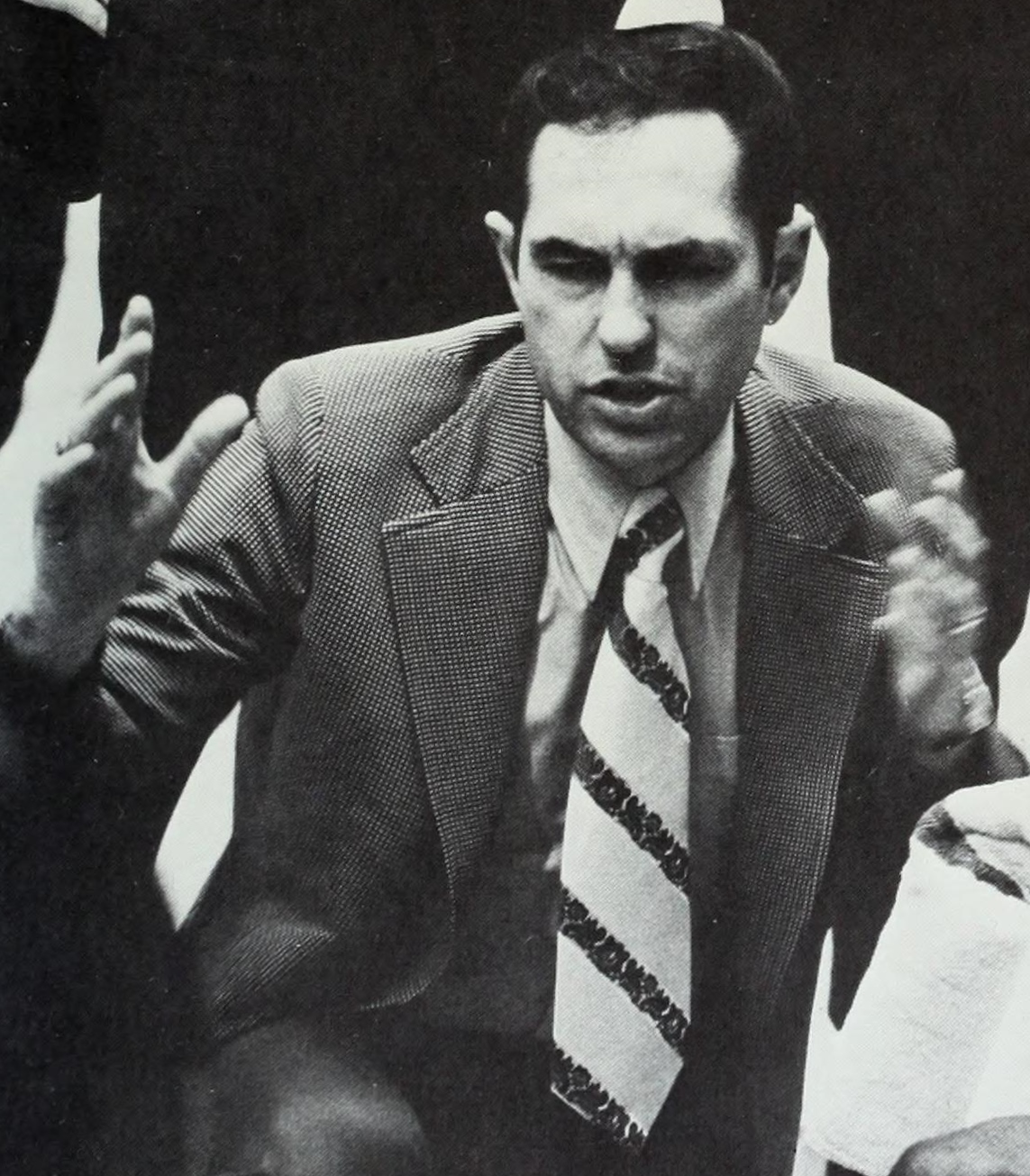
Head Coach Eddie Sutton (Arkansas 1974–1985 & Kentucky 1985–1989)

Sutton coached the Razorbacks for 11 years from 1974 to 1985, Sutton held a record of 260–75—including five Southwest Conference regular season championships, nine NCAA Tournament appearances, and a Final Four appearance in 1978. In 1985, Sutton would be hired away from Arkansas by Kentucky, leading them to the Elite Eight of the 1986 NCAA tournament. Two seasons later, Sutton and the 25–5 Wildcats captured their 37th SEC title (which was later vacated by the SEC) and were ranked as the No. 6 college basketball team in the nation before being upset in the Southeast Regional by Villanova in the 1988 NCAA tournament. Sutton would resign in 1989 amidst controversy regarding NCAA recruiting and bribery violations.

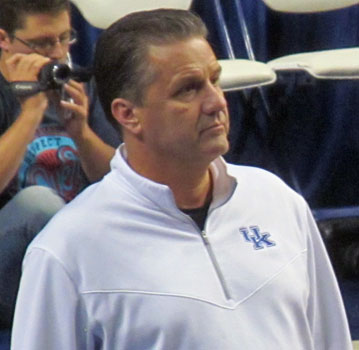
Head Coach John Calipari (Kentucky 2009-2024 & Arkansas 2025-Present)

Calipari coached the Wildcats for 15 seasons from 2009 to 2024. Calipari held a record of 410–123—including 6 Southeastern Conference championships, 12 NCAA Tournament appearances, 4 Final Four appearances and the 2012 National Championship. John Calipari would leave Kentucky due to pressure from the Kentucky boosters and fanbase despite being offered a lifetime contract by the Athletic Director Mitch Barnhart. Calipari would sign with Arkansas just a day after departing from Kentucky. As of February 8, 2025, John Calipari is 14-9 (3–6) with the Razorbacks.

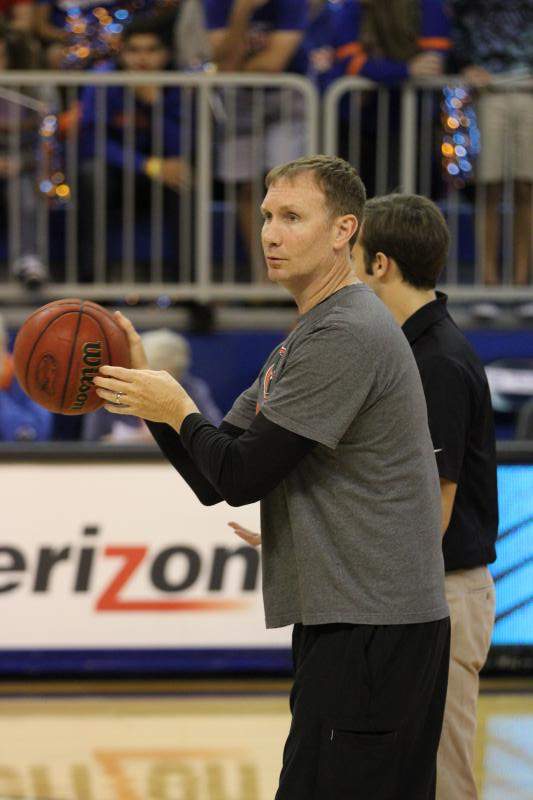
Head Coach John Pelphrey (Kentucky Player 1988–1992 & Arkansas Coach 2007–2011)

Additional to these coaches, in 2007, Arkansas hired former Kentucky player John Pelphrey to be their head coach. However, after going 1–3 against Kentucky, Pelphrey was fired in 2011.

=== Players ===
With John Calipari's departure from Kentucky, he took with him 3 players with him: Zvonimir Ivisic, Adou Thiero and DJ Wagner. Additionally, Calipari was able to flip three of his Kentucky commitments to Arkansas: Karter Knox, Johnuel “Boogie” Fland and Billy Richmond. Kentucky's 2024-2025 roster includes Jaxon Robinson, who began his collegiate career at Arkansas before transferring to BYU, eventually transferring with Mark Pope to Kentucky.

== Game results ==
Arkansas victories	Kentucky victories	Tie games

No.	Date	Location	Winning team		Losing team	
1	December 18, 1945	Lexington, KY	Kentucky	67	Arkansas	42
2	December 13, 1948	Lexington, KY	Kentucky	76	Arkansas	59
3	January 2, 1950	Fayetteville, AR	Kentucky	57	Arkansas	53
4	March 25, 1978	St. Louis, MO (Final Four)	#1 Kentucky	64	#5 Arkansas	59
5	January 25, 1992	Lexington, KY	#9 Arkansas	105	#8 Kentucky	88
6	February 10, 1993	Fayetteville, AR	#14 Arkansas	101	#2 Kentucky	94
7	March 13, 1993	Lexington, KY (SEC Tournament)	#4 Kentucky	92	#14 Arkansas	81
8	February 9, 1994	Lexington, KY	#3 Arkansas	90	#4 Kentucky	82
9	March 12, 1994	Memphis, TN (SEC Tournament)	#10 Kentucky	90	#1 Arkansas	78
10	January 29, 1995	Fayetteville, AR	#9 Arkansas	94	#5 Kentucky	92
11	March 12, 1995	Atlanta, GA (SEC Championship)	#3 Kentucky	95^{OT}	#5 Arkansas	93
12	February 11, 1996	Lexington, KY	#2 Kentucky	88	Arkansas	73
13	March 3, 1996	New Orleans, LA (SEC Tournament)	#1 Kentucky	95	Arkansas	75
14	January 26, 1997	Fayetteville, AR	#3 Kentucky	83	Arkansas	73
15	January 17, 1998	Lexington, KY	#6 Kentucky	80^{OT}	#22 Arkansas	77
16	March 7, 1998	Atlanta, GA (SEC Tournament)	#7 Kentucky	99	#16 Arkansas	74
17	February 20, 1999	Fayetteville, AR	Arkansas	74	#6 Kentucky	70
18	March 7, 1999	Atlanta, GA (SEC Championship)	#14 Kentucky	76	#22 Arkansas	63
19	February 26, 2000	Lexington, KY	#18 Kentucky	60	Arkansas	55
20	March 10, 2000	Atlanta, GA (SEC Tournament)	Arkansas	86	#16 Kentucky	72
21	February 25, 2001	Fayetteville, AR	Arkansas	82	#13 Kentucky	78
22	March 10, 2001	Nashville, TN (SEC Tournament)	#15 Kentucky	87	Arkansas	78
23	February 23, 2002	Lexington, KY	#12 Kentucky	71	Arkansas	58
24	February 19, 2003	Fayetteville, AR	#2 Kentucky	66	Arkansas	50
25	February 18, 2004	Lexington, KY	#9 Kentucky	73	Arkansas	56
26	January 29, 2005	Fayetteville, AR	#7 Kentucky	68	Arkansas	67
27	January 29, 2006	Lexington, KY	Kentucky	78	Arkansas	76
28	February 3, 2007	Fayetteville, AR	Kentucky	82	Arkansas	74
29	February 23, 2008	Lexington, KY	Kentucky	63	Arkansas	58
30	February 14, 2009	Fayetteville, AR	Kentucky	79	Arkansas	63
31	January 23, 2010	Lexington, KY	#2 Kentucky	101	Arkansas	70
32	February 23, 2011	Fayetteville, AR	Arkansas	77^{OT}	#22 Kentucky	76
33	January 17, 2012	Lexington, KY	#2 Kentucky	86	Arkansas	63
34	March 2, 2013	Fayetteville, AR	Arkansas	73	Kentucky	60
35	January 14, 2014	Fayetteville, AR	Arkansas	87^{OT}	#13 Kentucky	85
36	February 27, 2014	Lexington, KY	Arkansas	71^{OT}	#17 Kentucky	67
37	February 28, 2015	Lexington, KY	#1 Kentucky	84	#18 Arkansas	67
38	March 15, 2015	Nashville, TN (SEC Tournament)	#1 Kentucky	78	#21 Arkansas	63
39	January 21, 2016	Fayetteville, AR	#23 Kentucky	80	Arkansas	66
40	January 7, 2017	Lexington, KY	#6 Kentucky	97	Arkansas	71
41	March 12, 2017	Nashville, TN (SEC Championship)	#8 Kentucky	82	Arkansas	65
42	February 20, 2018	Fayetteville, AR	Kentucky	87	Arkansas	72
43	February 26, 2019	Lexington, KY	#4 Kentucky	70	Arkansas	66
44	January 18, 2020	Fayetteville, AR	#10 Kentucky	73	Arkansas	66
45	February 9, 2021	Lexington, KY	Arkansas	81	Kentucky	80
46	February 26, 2022	Fayetteville, AR	#18 Arkansas	75	#6 Kentucky	73
47	February 7, 2023	Lexington, KY	Arkansas	88	Kentucky	73
48	January 27, 2024	Fayetteville, AR "College Gameday"	#23 Kentucky	88	Arkansas	79
49	March 2, 2024	Lexington, KY	#16 Kentucky	111	Arkansas	102
50	February 1, 2025	Lexington, KY "Calipari's Return"	Arkansas	89	#12 Kentucky	79
51	January 31, 2026	Fayetteville, AR	Kentucky	85	#15 Arkansas	77
Series: Kentucky leads 36–15

=== Locations by frequency ===
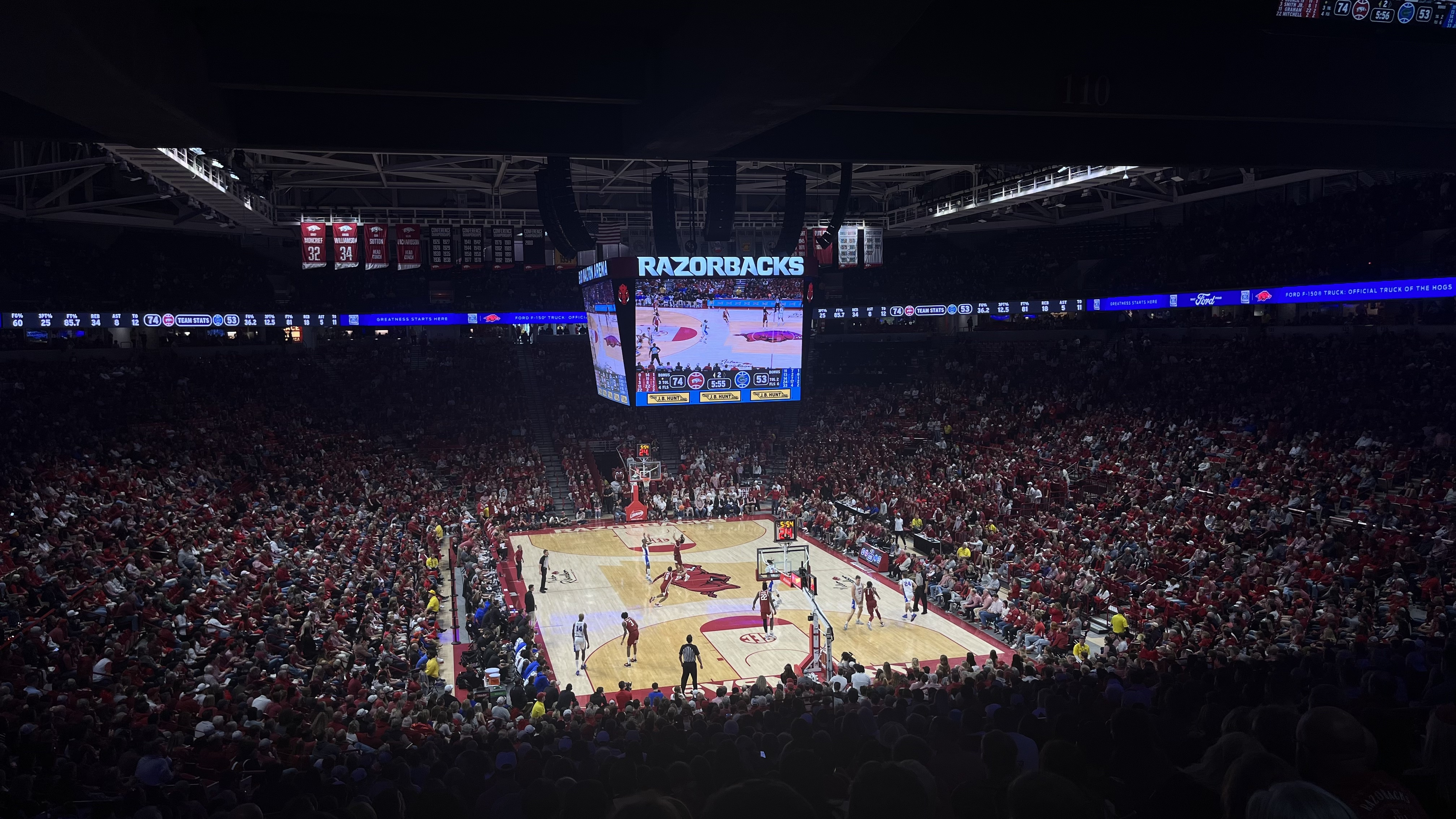
Bud Walton Arena in Fayetteville, AR

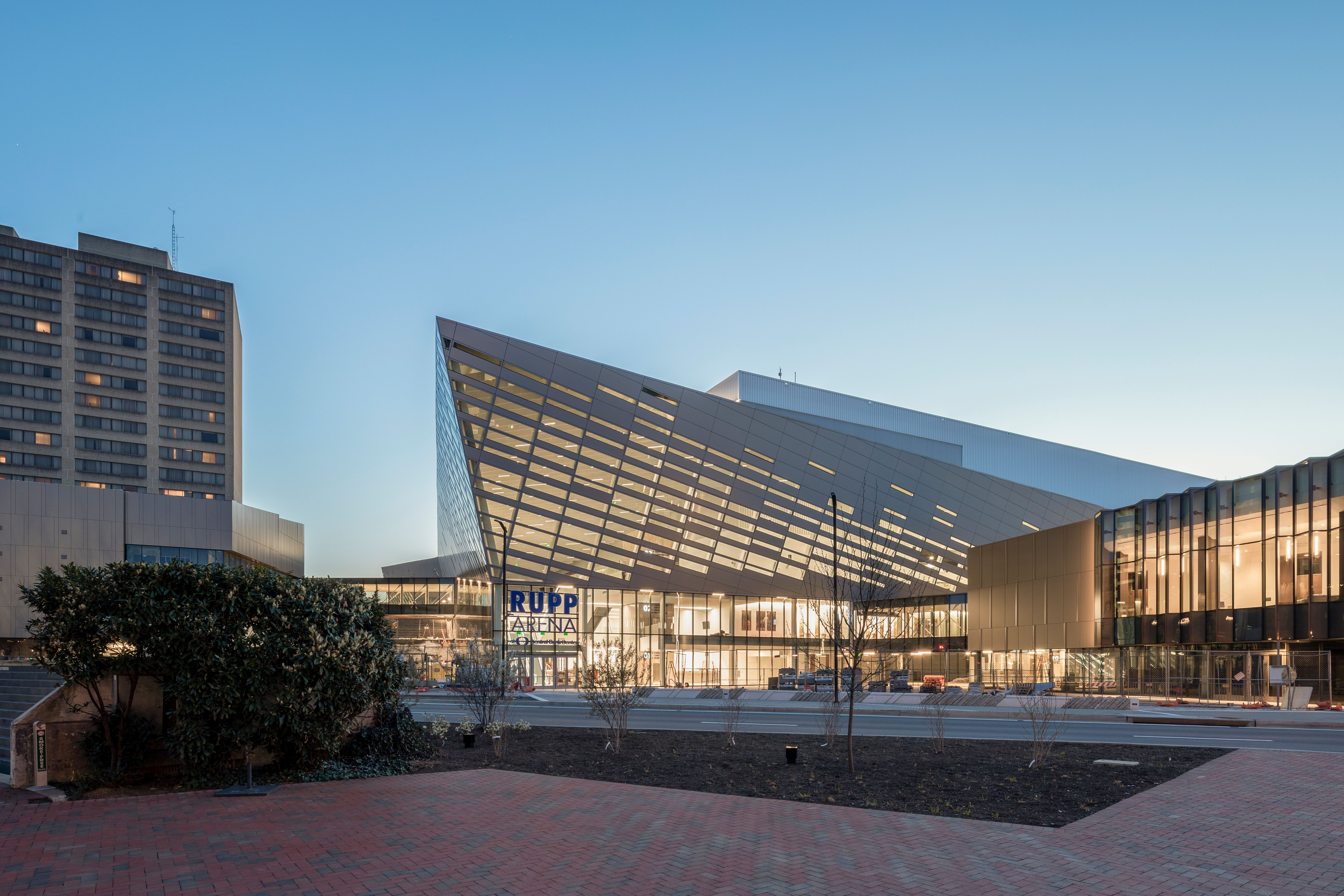
Rupp Arena in Lexington, KY

- Alumni Gym (Lexington, KY): 2 games (1945–1948)
- Barnhill Arena (Fayetteville, AR): 1 game (1950)
- Rupp Arena (Lexington, KY): 21 games (1992–present)
- Bud Walton Arena (Fayetteville, AR): 18 games (1993–present)
- The Checkerdome (St. Louis, MO): 1 game (1978)
- The Pyramid Arena (Memphis, TN): 1 game (1994)
- The Georgia Dome (Atlanta, GA): 3 games (1995–1999)
- The Louisiana Superdome (New Orleans, LA): 1 game (1996)
- Gaylord Entertainment Center/Bridgestone Arena (Nashville, TN): (2001–present)
