= 1948 NCAA basketball tournament =

Edition of USA college basketball tournament

- Teams: 8
- Finals site: Madison Square Garden, New York City, New York
- Champions: Kentucky Wildcats (1st title, 1st title game, 2nd Final Four)
- Runner-up: Baylor Bears (1st title game, 1st Final Four)
- Semifinalists: Holy Cross Crusaders (2nd Final Four); Kansas State Wildcats (1st Final Four)
- Winning coach: Adolph Rupp (1st title)
- MOP: Alex Groza (Kentucky)
- Attendance: 72,523
- Top scorer: Alex Groza (Kentucky) (54 points)

The 1948 NCAA basketball tournament involved 8 schools playing in single-elimination play to determine the national champion of men's NCAA Division I college basketball. The 10th annual edition of the tournament began on March 19, 1948, and ended with the championship game on March 23, at Madison Square Garden in New York City. A total of 10 games were played, including a third place game in each region and a national third place game.

Kentucky, coached by Adolph Rupp, won the national title with a 58–42 victory in the final game over Baylor, coached by Bill Henderson. Alex Groza of Kentucky was named the tournament's Most Outstanding Player.

== Locations ==
The following are the sites selected to host each round of the 1948 tournament:

=== Regionals ===
March 19 and 20
East Regional, Madison Square Garden, New York, New York (Host: Metropolitan New York Conference)
West Regional, Municipal Auditorium, Kansas City, Missouri (Host: Missouri Valley Conference)

=== Championship Game ===
March 23
Madison Square Garden, New York, New York (Host: Metropolitan New York Conference)

== Teams ==
Region	Team	Coach	Conference	Finished	Final Opponent	Score
East
East	Columbia	Gordon Ridings	EIBL	Regional Fourth Place	Michigan	L 66–49
East	Holy Cross	Doggie Julian	Independent	Third Place	Kansas State	W 60–54
East	Kentucky	Adolph Rupp	Southeastern	Champion	Baylor	W 58–42
East	Michigan	Ozzie Cowles	Big Ten	Regional third place	Columbia	W 66–49
West
West	Baylor	Bill Henderson	Southwest	Runner-up	Kentucky	L 58–42
West	Kansas State	Jack Gardner	Big Six	Fourth Place	Holy Cross	L 60–54
West	Washington	Art McLarney	Pacific Coast	Regional third place	Wyoming	W 57–47
West	Wyoming	Everett Shelton	Skyline	Regional Fourth Place	Washington	L 57–47

== Bracket ==
Quarterfinals
Kentucky	76
Columbia	53
Holy Cross	63
Michigan	45
Kansas State	58
Wyoming	48
Baylor	64
Washington	62

Semifinals
Kentucky	60
Holy Cross	52
Kansas State	52
Baylor	60

Finals
Kentucky	58
Baylor	42
Third place
Holy Cross	60
Kansas State	54

=== Regional third place games ===
East Regional third place
Columbia	49
Michigan	66

West Regional third place
Wyoming	47
Washington	57

== See also ==
- 1948 National Invitation Tournament
- 1948 NAIA Basketball Tournament
