= 1948 NCAA basketball championship game =

1948 NCAA Tournament Championship Game
National championship game
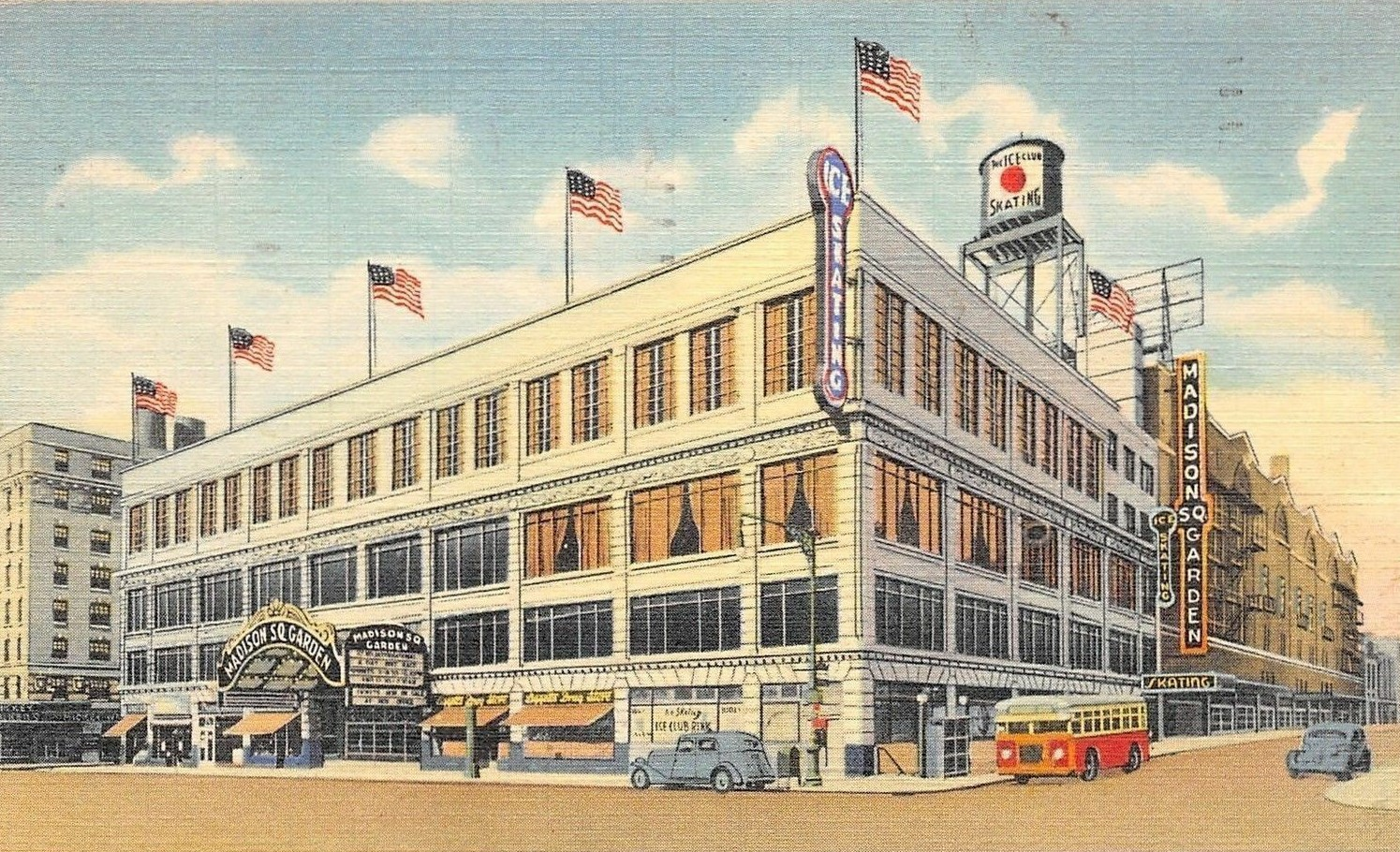
- Madison Square Garden in New York City hosted the championship game.
Kentucky Wildcats	Baylor Bears
SEC	SWC
(35-3)	(24-7)
58	42
Head coach: Adolph Rupp	Head coach: Bill Henderson
	1st half	2nd half	Total
Kentucky Wildcats	29	29	58
Baylor Bears	16	26	42
- Date: March 23, 1948
- Venue: Madison Square Garden, New York City
- MVP: Alex Groza, Kentucky

The 1948 NCAA University Division Basketball Championship Game was the finals of the 1948 NCAA basketball tournament and it determined the national champion for the 1947-48 NCAA men's basketball season. The game was played on March 23, 1948, at Madison Square Garden in New York City. It featured the Kentucky Wildcats of the Southeastern Conference, and the Baylor Bears of the Southwest Conference.

This was Baylor's last appearance in the title game until 2021, where they defeated the Gonzaga Bulldogs to win the national championship.

== Participating teams ==
=== Kentucky Wildcats ===
- East
  - Kentucky 76, Columbia 53
- Final Four
  - Kentucky 60, Holy Cross 52

=== Baylor Bears ===
- West
  - Baylor 64, Washington 62
- Final Four
  - Baylor 60, Kansas State 52

== Game summary ==
March 23, 1948

Kentucky Wildcats 58, Baylor Bears 42
Scoring by half: 29-16, 29-26
Pts: Alex Groza 14	Pts: Bill Johnson 10

Madison Square Garden, New York City
