= 1947–48 Kentucky Wildcats men's basketball team =

1947–48 season of University of Kentucky men's basketball team

1947–48 Kentucky Wildcats men's basketball
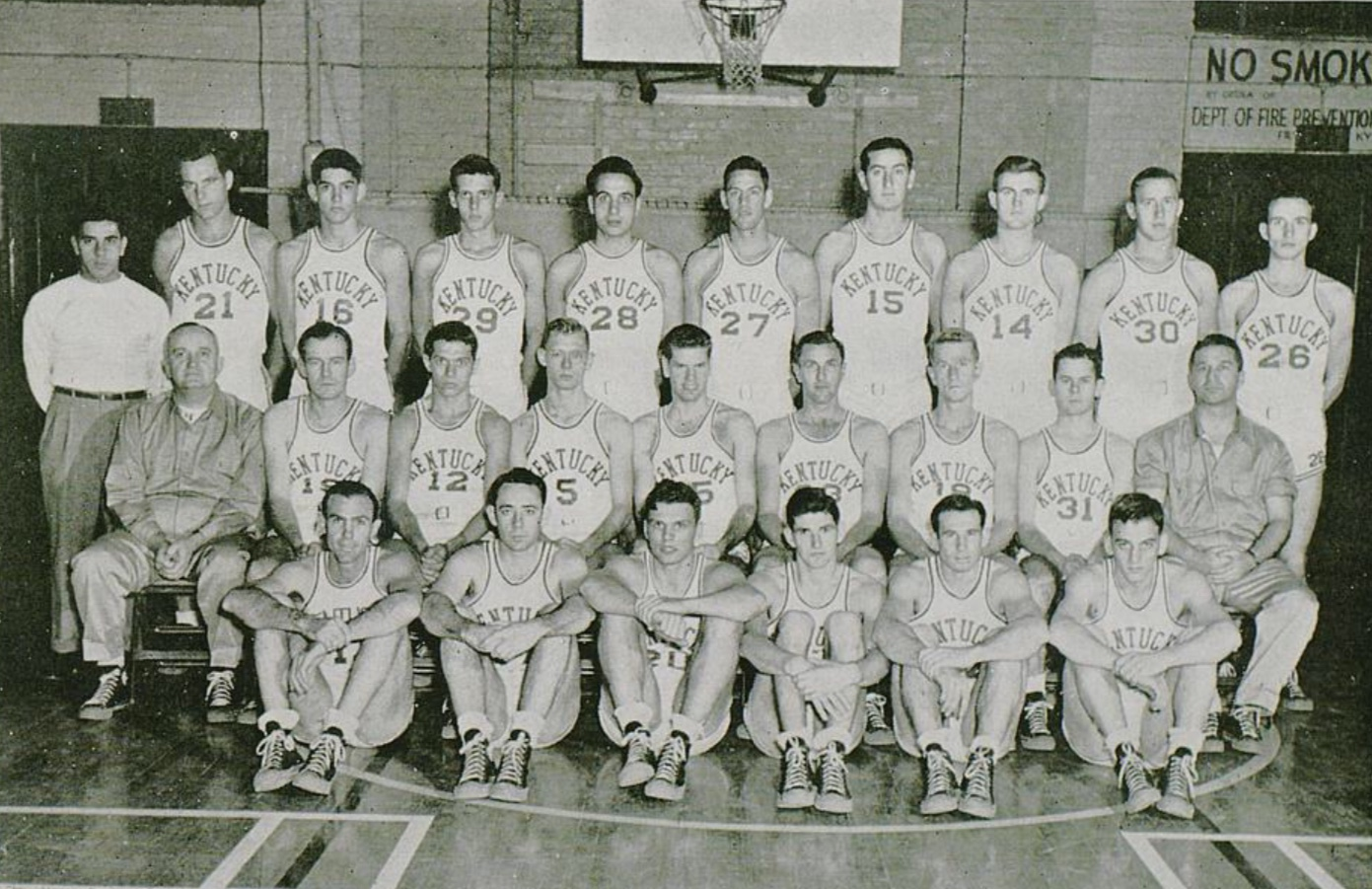

NCAA tournament National champions SEC regular season and tournament champions

National Championship Game, W 58–42 vs. Baylor
- Conference: Southeast Conference
- Record: 36–3 (9–0 SEC)
- Head coach: Adolph Rupp
- Assistant coach: Harry Lancaster
- Home arena: Alumni Gymnasium

The 1947–48 Kentucky Wildcats men's basketball team, also known as the Fabulous Five, represented University of Kentucky. The head coach was Adolph Rupp. The team was a member of the Southeast Conference and played their home games at Alumni Gymnasium.

They won 36 of 39 games in their conference, earning them the 1948 NCAA basketball tournament championship.

== NCAA tournament ==
- East
  - Kentucky 76, Columbia 53
- Final Four
  - Kentucky 60, Holy Cross 52
- Championship
  - Kentucky 58, Baylor 42

== Team players drafted into the NBA ==
Player	NBA club
Joe Holland	Baltimore Bullets
Ken Rollins	Fort Wayne Pistons
Jack Parkinson	Washington Capitols

== Fabulous Five ==
Though the Fabulous Five referred to the whole team during the 1947–1948 season, five players stood out in particular: Ralph Beard (guard), Alex Groza (center), Wallace "Wah Wah" Jones (forward), Cliff Barker (forward), and Kenny Rollins (guard). Following the successful 1947–1948 season at UK, all five competed as a unit and won gold at the 1948 Summer Olympics in London. Rollins graduated but the other four returned for the 1948–1949 season, which they dominated. Coach Rupp then retired the jerseys of Barker, Beard, Groza, Jones, and Rollins.
