= 1947–48 NCAA men's basketball season =

Men's collegiate basketball season

- NCAA Tournament: 1948
- Tournament dates: March 19 – 23, 1948
- National Championship: Madison Square Garden; New York City, New York
- NCAA Champions: Kentucky Wildcats
- Helms National Champions: Kentucky Wildcats
- Other champions: Saint Louis Billikens (NIT)
- Player of the Year (Helms): Ed Macauley, Saint Louis Billikens

The 1947–48 NCAA men's basketball season began in December 1947, progressed through the regular season and conference tournaments, and concluded with the 1948 NCAA basketball tournament championship game on March 23, 1948, at Madison Square Garden in New York, New York. The Kentucky Wildcats won their first NCAA national championship with a 58–42 victory over the Baylor Bears.

== Season headlines ==
- The dispute among basketball fans over which was more prestigious, the National Invitation Tournament or the NCAA Tournament, continued throughout the entire year.
- Saint Louis won the 1948 National Invitation Tournament.
- In 1995, the Premo-Porretta Power Poll retroactively selected Kentucky as its top-ranked team for the 1947–48 season.

== Conference membership changes ==
School	Former conference	New conference
Colorado Buffaloes	Skyline Conference	Big Seven Conference
Dickinson College Red Devils	Middle Atlantic States Conference North	No NCAA basketball program
Miami (OH) Redskins	Independent	Mid-American Conference
Washington University Bears	Missouri Valley Conference	Independent
Wayne Tartars	Mid-American Conference	Independent
Western Michigan Broncos	Independent	Mid-American Conference

== Regular season ==
=== Conferences ===
==== Conference winners and tournaments ====
Conference	Regular season winner	Conference player of the year	Conference tournament	Tournament venue (City)	Tournament winner
Big Seven Conference	Kansas State	None selected	No Tournament		
Big Nine Conference	Michigan	None selected	No Tournament		
Border Conference	Arizona	None selected	No Tournament		
Eastern Intercollegiate Basketball League	Yale	None selected	No Tournament		
Metropolitan New York Conference	Columbia		No Tournament		
Mid-American Conference	Cincinnati	None selected	No Tournament		
Middle Atlantic States Conference North	Muhlenberg		No Tournament		
Missouri Valley Conference	Oklahoma A&M	None selected	No Tournament		
Mountain States (Skyline) Conference	BYU		No Tournament		
Pacific Coast Conference	Washington (North); USC (South)		No Tournament; Washington defeated USC in best-of-three conference championship playoff series		
Southeastern Conference	Kentucky	None selected	1948 SEC men's basketball tournament	Jefferson County Armory, (Louisville, Kentucky)	Kentucky
Southern Conference	NC State	None selected	1948 Southern Conference men's basketball tournament	Duke Indoor Stadium (Durham, North Carolina)	NC State
Southwest Conference	Baylor	None selected	No Tournament		
Western New York Little Three Conference	Niagara		No Tournament		
Yankee Conference	Connecticut	None selected	No Tournament		

==== Conference standings ====
1947–48 Big Seven Conference men's basketball standings
	Conf.				Overall
Team	W		L	PCT	W		L	PCT
Kansas State	9	–	3	.750	22	–	6	.786
Oklahoma	7	–	5	.583	13	–	9	.591
Missouri	7	–	5	.583	14	–	10	.583
Iowa State	6	–	6	.500	15	–	8	.652
Nebraska	5	–	7	.417	11	–	13	.458
Kansas	4	–	8	.333	9	–	15	.375
Colorado	4	–	8	.333	7	–	14	.333

1947–48 Big Nine Conference men's basketball standings
	Conf.				Overall
Team	W		L	PCT	W		L	PCT
Michigan	10	–	2	.833	16	–	6	.727
Iowa	8	–	4	.667	15	–	4	.789
Illinois	7	–	5	.583	15	–	5	.750
Wisconsin	7	–	5	.583	12	–	8	.600
Purdue	6	–	6	.500	11	–	9	.550
Minnesota	5	–	7	.417	10	–	10	.500
Ohio State	5	–	7	.417	10	–	10	.500
Indiana	3	–	9	.250	8	–	12	.400
Northwestern	3	–	9	.250	6	–	14	.300

1947–48 Border Conference men's basketball standings
	Conf.				Overall
Team	W		L	PCT	W		L	PCT
Arizona	12	–	4	.750	19	–	10	.655
Texas Tech	10	–	6	.625	16	–	12	.571
Arizona State–Tempe	9	–	11	.450	13	–	11	.542
Arizona State–Flagstaff	8	–	8	.500	13	–	8	.619
New Mexico	8	–	8	.500	14	–	15	.483
West Texas State	7	–	9	.438	11	–	13	.458
New Mexico A&M	6	–	10	.375	12	–	11	.522
Texas State M&M	6	–	10	.375	13	–	16	.448
Hardin–Simmons	6	–	10	.375	6	–	10	.375

1947–48 Eastern Intercollegiate Basketball League standings
	Conf.				Overall
Team	W		L	PCT	W		L	PCT
Columbia	11	–	1	.917	20	–	3	.870
Cornell	9	–	3	.750	16	–	9	.640
Princeton	6	–	6	.500	12	–	11	.522
Dartmouth	6	–	6	.500	12	–	12	.500
Pennsylvania	5	–	7	.417	10	–	14	.417
Yale	4	–	8	.333	14	–	13	.519
Harvard	1	–	11	.083	5	–	20	.200

1947–48 Metropolitan New York Conference men's basketball standings
	Conf.				Overall
Team	W		L	PCT	W		L	PCT
NYU	5	–	1	.833	22	–	4	.846
CCNY	4	–	1	.800	18	–	3	.857
Fordham	3	–	3	.500	17	–	6	.739
Manhattan	3	–	3	.500	22	–	6	.786
St. John's	3	–	3	.500	12	–	11	.522
St. Francis (NY)	2	–	3	.400	16	–	9	.640
Brooklyn	0	–	6	.000	10	–	10	.500

1947–48 Mid-American Conference men's basketball standings
	Conf.				Overall
Team	W		L	PCT	W		L	PCT
Cincinnati	7	–	2	.778	17	–	7	.708
Butler	4	–	2	.667	14	–	7	.667
Ohio	4	–	4	.500	10	–	10	.500
Miami (Ohio)	3	–	5	.375	13	–	15	.464
Western Reserve	2	–	6	.250	14	–	10	.583
Western Michigan	1	–	2	.333	12	–	10	.545

1947–48 Middle Atlantic States Conference North men's basketball standings
	Conf.				Overall
Team	W		L	PCT	W		L	PCT
Muhlenberg	8	–	0	1.000	21	–	4	.840
Lafayette	5	–	3	.625	12	–	9	.571
Gettysburg	4	–	4	.500	10	–	10	.500
Bucknell	2	–	6	.250	5	–	17	.227
Lehigh	1	–	7	.125	2	–	16	.111

1947–48 Missouri Valley Conference men's basketball standings
	Conf.				Overall
Team	W		L	PCT	W		L	PCT
Oklahoma A&M	10	–	0	1.000	27	–	4	.871
Saint Louis	8	–	2	.800	24	–	3	.889
Drake	5	–	5	.500	14	–	12	.538
Creighton	4	–	6	.400	10	–	13	.435
Tulsa	2	–	8	.200	7	–	16	.304
Wichita Municipal	1	–	9	.100	12	–	13	.480

1947–48 Mountain States Conference men's basketball standings
	Conf.				Overall
Team	W		L	PCT	W		L	PCT
BYU	8	–	2	.800	16	–	11	.593
Wyoming	6	–	4	.600	18	–	9	.667
Denver	6	–	4	.600	18	–	11	.621
Utah	6	–	4	.600	11	–	9	.550
Utah State	3	–	7	.300	8	–	16	.333
Colorado State	1	–	9	.100	6	–	15	.286

1947–48 Pacific Coast Conference men's basketball standings
	Conf.				Overall
Team	W		L	PCT	W		L	PCT
North
Washington †	10	–	6	.625	23	–	11	.676
Oregon State	10	–	6	.625	21	–	13	.618
Washington State	9	–	7	.563	19	–	10	.655
Oregon	8	–	8	.500	18	–	11	.621
Idaho	3	–	13	.188	17	–	15	.531
South
California	11	–	1	.917	25	–	9	.735
USC	7	–	5	.583	14	–	10	.583
UCLA	3	–	9	.250	12	–	13	.480
Stanford	3	–	9	.250	15	–	11	.577
† Conference playoff series winner

1947–48 Rocky Mountain Conference men's basketball standings
	Conf.				Overall
Team	W		L	PCT	W		L	PCT
Colorado State–Greeley	5	–	1	.833	10	–	13	.435
Colorado College	4	–	2	.667	11	–	8	.579
Western State (CO)	3	–	3	.500	8	–	14	.364
Colorado Mines	0	–	6	.000	1	–	18	.053
Montana State	0	–	0	–	18	–	9	.667

1947–48 Southeastern Conference men's basketball standings
	Conf.				Overall
Team	W		L	PCT	W		L	PCT
Kentucky †	9	–	0	1.000	36	–	3	.923
Tulane	13	–	1	.929	23	–	3	.885
Tennessee	10	–	2	.833	20	–	5	.800
Alabama	8	–	8	.500	15	–	12	.556
Auburn	7	–	7	.500	12	–	10	.545
Georgia	6	–	8	.429	18	–	10	.643
Florida	5	–	7	.417	15	–	10	.600
Georgia Tech	6	–	10	.375	12	–	16	.429
Mississippi State	6	–	10	.375	6	–	12	.333
Ole Miss	5	–	9	.357	11	–	12	.478
LSU	4	–	10	.286	8	–	18	.308
Vanderbilt	4	–	11	.267	8	–	14	.364
† Regular-season championship and SEC Tournament winner

1947–48 Southern Conference men's basketball standings
	Conf.				Overall
Team	W		L	PCT	W		L	PCT
North Carolina State †	12	–	0	1.000	29	–	3	.906
George Washington	13	–	3	.813	19	–	7	.731
North Carolina	11	–	4	.733	20	–	7	.741
Maryland	9	–	6	.600	11	–	14	.440
Davidson	10	–	7	.588	19	–	9	.679
Virginia Tech	7	–	5	.583	14	–	9	.609
Duke	8	–	6	.571	17	–	12	.586
Wake Forest	8	–	7	.533	18	–	11	.621
William & Mary	8	–	7	.533	13	–	10	.565
South Carolina	8	–	7	.533	12	–	11	.522
Washington and Lee	5	–	9	.357	7	–	17	.292
The Citadel	4	–	8	.333	8	–	9	.471
Richmond	4	–	9	.308	8	–	14	.364
Furman	3	–	10	.231	11	–	15	.423
Clemson	3	–	14	.176	6	–	17	.261
VMI	1	–	12	.077	3	–	16	.158
† Southern Conference Tournament winner

1947–48 Southwest Conference men's basketball standings
	Conf.				Overall
Team	W		L	PCT	W		L	PCT
Baylor	11	–	1	.917	24	–	8	.750
Texas	9	–	3	.750	20	–	5	.800
Arkansas	8	–	4	.667	16	–	8	.667
Rice	6	–	6	.500	10	–	14	.417
SMU	5	–	7	.417	13	–	10	.565
Texas A&M	2	–	10	.167	7	–	17	.292
TCU	1	–	11	.083	3	–	20	.130

1947–48 Western New York Little Three Conference men's basketball standings
	Conf.				Overall
Team	W		L	PCT	W		L	PCT
Niagara	3	–	1	.750	15	–	9	.625
Canisius	2	–	2	.500	10	–	15	.400
St. Bonaventure	1	–	3	.250	12	–	10	.545

1947–48 Yankee Conference men's basketball standings
	Conf.				Overall
Team	W		L	PCT	W		L	PCT
Connecticut	6	–	1	.857	17	–	6	.739
Rhode Island State	5	–	1	.833	17	–	6	.739
Vermont	2	–	1	.667	14	–	6	.700
Maine	2	–	5	.286	11	–	7	.611
New Hampshire	2	–	5	.286	5	–	12	.294
Massachusetts	0	–	4	.000	2	–	14	.125

=== Major independents ===
A total of 56 college teams played as major independents. Western Kentucky State (28–2) had the best winning percentage (.933) and Louisville (29–6) finished with the most wins.

1947–48 NCAA men's basketball independents standings
	Conf.				Overall
Team	W		L	PCT	W		L	PCT
Western Kentucky State		–		–	28	–	2	.933
Bradley		–		–	28	–	3	.903
Hamline		–		–	28	–	3	.903
Holy Cross		–		–	26	–	4	.867
West Virginia		–		–	17	–	3	.850
La Salle		–		–	20	–	4	.833
Louisville		–		–	29	–	6	.829
Bowling Green State		–		–	27	–	6	.818
Seton Hall		–		–	18	–	4	.818
LIU		–		–	17	–	4	.810
Toledo		–		–	21	–	5	.808
Indiana State		–		–	27	–	7	.794
Lawrence Tech		–		–	22	–	6	.786
Siena		–		–	22	–	6	.786
Xavier		–		–	24	–	8	.750
Loyola (Ill.)		–		–	26	–	9	.743
Baldwin Wallace		–		–	17	–	6	.739
Duquesne		–		–	17	–	6	.739
Colgate		–		–	14	–	5	.737
DePaul		–		–	22	–	8	.733
Eastern Kentucky State		–		–	17	–	7	.708
Notre Dame		–		–	17	–	7	.708
Marshall		–		–	22	–	11	.667
Montana State		–		–	18	–	9	.667
Montana		–		–	21	–	11	.656
Kent State		–		–	15	–	8	.652
Texas Wesleyan		–		–	19	–	11	.633
Akron		–		–	15	–	9	.625
Villanova		–		–	15	–	9	.625
Virginia		–		–	16	–	10	.615
Rutgers		–		–	14	–	9	.609
Navy		–		–	10	–	7	.588
Boston College		–		–	13	–	10	.565
Michigan State		–		–	12	–	10	.545
St. Joseph's		–		–	13	–	11	.542
San Francisco		–		–	13	–	11	.542
Boston University		–		–	10	–	9	.526
Temple		–		–	12	–	11	.522
Santa Clara		–		–	11	–	11	.500
Pittsburgh		–		–	10	–	11	.476
Washington University		–		–	10	–	11	.476
Penn State		–		–	9	–	10	.474
Army		–		–	8	–	9	.471
Georgetown		–		–	13	–	15	.464
Dayton		–		–	12	–	14	.462
Saint Mary's		–		–	11	–	13	.458
Syracuse		–		–	11	–	13	.458
Youngstown		–		–	10	–	14	.417
John Carroll		–		–	9	–	14	.391
Wayne		–		–	8	–	13	.381
Marquette		–		–	9	–	15	.375
Nevada		–		–	9	–	16	.360
Valparaiso		–		–	8	–	15	.348
Detroit		–		–	7	–	15	.318
Brown		–		–	6	–	14	.300
Scranton		–		–	7	–	20	.259

== Post-season tournaments ==
=== NCAA tournament ===
==== Semifinals & finals ====
National Semifinals
Kentucky	60
Holy Cross	52
Kansas State	52
Baylor	60

National Finals
Kentucky	58
Baylor	42
Third place
Holy Cross	60
Kansas State	54

=== National Invitation tournament ===
==== Semifinals & finals ====
Semifinals
Western Kentucky State	53
Saint Louis	60
NYU	72
DePaul	59

Finals
Saint Louis	65
NYU	52
Third place
Western Kentucky State	61
DePaul	59

== Awards ==
=== Consensus All-American teams ===
Consensus First Team
Player	Position	Class	Team
Ralph Beard	G	Junior	Kentucky
Ed Macauley	F	Junior	Saint Louis
Jim McIntyre	C	Junior	Minnesota
Kevin O'Shea	G	Sophomore	Notre Dame
Murray Wier	G	Senior	Iowa

Consensus Second Team
Player	Position	Class	Team
Dick Dickey	F	Sophomore	NC State
Arnie Ferrin	F	Senior	Utah
Alex Groza	C	Junior	Kentucky
Hal Haskins	F/G	Sophomore	Hamline
George Kaftan	F	Senior	Holy Cross
Duane Klueh	G	Junior	Indiana State
Tony Lavelli	F	Junior	Yale
Jack Nichols	C	Senior	Washington
Andy Wolfe	G/F	Senior	California

=== Major player of the year awards ===
- Helms Player of the Year: Ed Macauley, Saint Louis

=== Other major awards ===
- NIT/Haggerty Award (Top player in New York City metro area): Dolph Schayes, NYU

== Coaching changes ==
A number of teams changed coaches during the season and after it ended.

Team	Former Coach	Interim Coach	New Coach	Reason
Arizona State–Tempe	Rudy Lavik		Bill Kajikawa	
Boston University	Russ Peterson		Charles Cummings	
Bradley	Alfred J. Robertson		Forddy Anderson	Robertson also stepped down from the baseball team, football team, and athletic director duties.
Canisius	Earl Brown		Joseph Niland	
Detroit	John Shada		Bob Calihan	
Drake	Forddy Anderson		Jack McClelland	Anderson left to coach Bradley.
Duquesne	Chick Davies		Dudey Moore	
Holy Cross	Doggie Julian		Buster Sheary	
Indiana State	John Wooden		John Longfellow	
Kent State	Harry C. Adams		David E. McDowell	
Michigan	Osborne Cowles		Ernie McCoy	McCoy is also the assistant athletic director. Cowles left to coach Minnesota.
Minnesota	Dave MacMillan		Osborne Cowles	
Montana State	Max Worthington		Brick Breeden	
Penn	Red Kellett		Howie Dallmar	
Rhode Island State	Frank Keaney		Red Haire	
St. Francis (NY)	Joseph Brennan		Daniel Lynch	
Texas State M&M	Ross Moore		Dale Waters	
TCU	Herb McQuillan		Buster Brannon	
UCLA	Wilbur Johns		John Wooden	
Valparaiso	Emory Bauer		Don Warnke	
Wichita Municipal	Melvin J. Binford		Ken Gunning	
