= 1947–48 Illinois Fighting Illini men's basketball team =

American college basketball season

1947–48 Illinois Fighting Illini men's basketball
- Conference: Big Ten Conference
- Record: 15–5 (7–5 Big Ten)
- Head coach: Harry Combes (1st season)
- Assistant coaches: Howie Braun (11th season); Wally Roettger (13th season)
- MVP: Jack Burmaster
- Captain: Jack Burmaster
- Home arena: Huff Hall

1947–48 Big Nine Conference men's basketball standings
	Conf.				Overall
Team	W		L	PCT	W		L	PCT
Michigan	10	–	2	.833	16	–	6	.727
Iowa	8	–	4	.667	15	–	4	.789
Illinois	7	–	5	.583	15	–	5	.750
Wisconsin	7	–	5	.583	12	–	8	.600
Purdue	6	–	6	.500	11	–	9	.550
Minnesota	5	–	7	.417	10	–	10	.500
Ohio State	5	–	7	.417	10	–	10	.500
Indiana	3	–	9	.250	8	–	12	.400
Northwestern	3	–	9	.250	6	–	14	.300

The 1947–48 Illinois Fighting Illini men's basketball team represented the University of Illinois.

== Regular season ==
After 11 seasons that included three Big Ten Conference championships and a trip to the NCAA tournament, Doug Mills removed himself as head coach of the Fighting Illini, however; he remained as the University of Illinois athletic director until 1966. Replacing Mills was a former Illini player, Harry Combes. Combes was a senior during Mills' first season with the Fighting Illini, a team that won the conference championship. During Combes' 20 years as head coach, the Illini won 316 games while losing only 150, a .678 winning percentage. During conference play, his teams won 174 times while only losing 104 games. Combes still owns several Illini coaching records including winning 4 conference championships. Combes most significant feat over his 20 years was back-to-back NCAA tournament third-place finishes in 1951 and 1952. Combes came to Illinois after spending five seasons at Champaign High School where he served as boys basketball and baseball coach. While at Champaign High School, from 1939 to 1947, he compiled an impressive of 254–46 record in basketball and an equally substantial baseball record of 70-26-2 (.724) over a five-year period (1937–1942).

With the 'Whiz Kids' gone, a fresh start with a couple of All-American athletes was the focus for the new head coach. Bill Erickson, Dwight Eddleman, Jack Burmaster, Wally Osterkorn, Fred Green, Burdette Thurlby and Jim Marks returned from a team that finished with an overall record of 14–6, placing second in the Big Ten.

=== Roster ===
1947–48 Illinois Fighting Illini men's basketball team
Players
Coaches

Pos.	#	Name	Height	Weight	Year	Previous school	Hometown
C	7	Robert Menke	6 ft 3 in (1.91 m)	185 lb (84 kg)	Jr	Elgin High School	Elgin, Illinois
G	9	Dick Foley	6 ft 0 in (1.83 m)	160 lb (73 kg)	Jr	Paris High School	Paris, Illinois
G	11	Jack Burmaster (C)	6 ft 2 in (1.88 m)	188 lb (85 kg)	Sr	Elgin High School	Elgin, Illinois
C	13	Walter Osterkorn	6 ft 4 in (1.93 m)	205 lb (93 kg)	So	Amundsen High School	Chicago, Illinois
F	14	Burdette Thurlby	6 ft 2 in (1.88 m)	180 lb (82 kg)	So	Kirkland High School	Kirkland, Illinois
F	16	Robert Doster	6 ft 1 in (1.85 m)	170 lb (77 kg)	Jr	Decatur High School	Decatur, Illinois
G	17	Joseph Rodriguez	5 ft 10 in (1.78 m)	165 lb (75 kg)	Sr	Niagara Falls High School	Niagara Falls, New York
C	19	Robert Rowe	6 ft 7 in (2.01 m)	200 lb (91 kg)	Jr	Warren High School	Warren, Illinois
C	21	Walt Kersulis	6 ft 4 in (1.93 m)	190 lb (86 kg)	So	East St. Louis Senior High School	East St. Louis, Illinois
F	22	Van Anderson	6 ft 2 in (1.88 m)	190 lb (86 kg)	So	Sullivan Community High School	Sullivan, Illinois
F	24	Benton Odum	6 ft 0.5 in (1.84 m)	175 lb (79 kg)	So	Marion High School	Marion, Illinois
G	26	Stanley Fronczak	6 ft 2 in (1.88 m)	200 lb (91 kg)	Sr	Brooklyn High School	Brooklyn, New York
F	27	Jim Marks	6 ft 1 in (1.85 m)	175 lb (79 kg)	Jr	Edwardsville High School	Edwardsville, Illinois
F	29	Dwight Humphrey	5 ft 9 in (1.75 m)	145 lb (66 kg)	Jr	Moline High School	Moline, Illinois
F	33	Bill Erickson	6 ft 1 in (1.85 m)	174 lb (79 kg)	So	East High School	Rockford, Illinois
F	40	Dwight Eddleman	6 ft 2 in (1.88 m)	190 lb (86 kg)	Jr	Centralia High School	Centralia, Illinois
C	48	Fred Green	6 ft 7 in (2.01 m)	206 lb (93 kg)	Jr	Urbana High School	Urbana, Illinois

Head coach

- Harry Combes (University of Illinois) (1st year)

Assistant coach(es)

- Wally Roettger (University of Illinois) (13th year)
- Howie Braun (University of Illinois) (11th year)

Legend

- (C) Team captain
- (S) Suspended
- (I) Ineligible
- (W) Walk-on
- Injured
- Current redshirt

Roster

== Schedule ==
Date time, TV	Rank^{#}	Opponent^{#}	Result	Record	Site (attendance) city, state
Non-Conference regular season
12/5/1947*		Coe	W 67–27	1–0	Huff Hall (6,905); Champaign, IL
12/8/1947*		Notre Dame	W 40–38	2–0	Huff Hall (6,905); Champaign, IL
12/13/1947*		Pittsburgh	W 70–33	3–0	Huff Hall (6,905); Champaign, IL
12/20/1947*		at Penn	W 70–44	4–0	Palestra (2,500); Philadelphia, PA
12/22/1947*		Washington State	W 71–35	5–0	Huff Hall (5,196); Champaign, IL
12/23/1947*		Washington State	W 59–42	6–0	Huff Hall (4,142); Champaign, IL
1/1/1948*		Harvard	W 77–41	7–0	Huff Hall (6,905); Champaign, IL
Big Ten regular season
1/3/1948		at Wisconsin	L 47–52	7–1 (0–1)	Wisconsin Field House (13,000); Madison, WI
1/5/1948		Northwestern; Rivalry	W 52–47	8–1 (1–1)	Huff Hall (6,905); Champaign, IL
1/10/1948		Ohio State	W 61-58	9–1 (2–1)	Huff Hall (6,905); Champaign, IL
1/17/1948		at Minnesota	L 51–59	9–2 (2–2)	Williams Arena (16,690); Minneapolis, MN
1/19/1948		Indiana; Rivalry	W 46–45	10–2 (3–2)	Huff Hall (6,905); Champaign, IL
1/24/1948		Wisconsin	W 57–36	11-2 (4–2)	Huff Hall (6,905); Champaign, IL
1/28/1948*		at Marquette	W 88–66	12–2 (4–2)	Marquette Gymnasium (5,200); Milwaukee, WI
2/7/1948		Michigan	L 57–66	12–3 (4–3)	Huff Hall (6,905); Champaign, IL
2/9/1948*		at Iowa; Rivalry	L 61–70	12–4 (4–4)	Iowa Field House (16,048); Iowa City, IA
2/14/1948		at Ohio State	L 50–57	12–5 (4–5)	Ohio Expo Center Coliseum (4,449); Columbus, OH
2/21/1948		at Purdue	W 98–54	13–5 (5–5)	Lambert Fieldhouse (6,905); West Lafayette, IN
2/28/1948		at Northwestern; Rivalry	W 60–43	14–5 (6–5)	Chicago Stadium (17,680); Chicago, IL
3/1/1948		at Indiana; Rivalry	W 52–51	15–5 (7–5)	The Field House (10,500); Bloomington, IN
*Non-conference game. ^{#}Rankings from AP Poll. (#) Tournament seedings in parentheses. All times are in Central Time.

== Player stats ==
Player	Games played	Field goals	Free throws	Points
Dwight Eddleman	20	115	47	277
Jack Burmaster	18	72	34	178
Bill Erickson	18	55	37	147
Wally Osterkorn	15	48	45	141
Fred Green	18	43	21	107
Jim Marks	15	33	18	84
Burdette Thurlby	17	28	18	74
Walt Kersulis	15	25	18	68
Van Anderson	14	21	8	50
Stan Fronczak	17	21	7	49
Dick Foley	16	13	6	32
Bob Doster	7	3	4	10
Cliff Fulton	5	3	0	6
Benton Odum	2	2	0	4
Joe Rodriguez	2	1	1	3
Tom Gallagher	6	1	0	2
Bob Menke	1	1	0	2
Robert Rowe	1	0	0	0
Dwight Humphrey	5	0	0	0

== Awards and honors ==
- Dwight Eddleman
  - Associated Press 2nd team All-American (1948)
  - Converse 3rd team All-American (1948)
  - True Magazine 3rd team All-American (1948)
  - Fighting Illini All-Century team (2005)
- Jack Burmaster
  - Converse Honorable Mention All-American (1948)
  - Team Most Valuable Player

== Team players drafted into the NBA ==
Round	Pick	Player	NBA club
2	-	Jack Burmaster	St. Louis Bombers
