= 1947–48 Iowa State Cyclones men's basketball team =

American college basketball season

1947–48 Iowa State Cyclones men's basketball
- Conference: Big Six Conference
- Record: 14–9 (6–6 Big Six)
- Head coach: Clay Sutherland (1st season)
- Assistant coach: Cap Timm
- Home arena: Iowa State Armory

1947–48 Big Seven Conference men's basketball standings
	Conf.				Overall
Team	W		L	PCT	W		L	PCT
Kansas State	9	–	3	.750	22	–	6	.786
Oklahoma	7	–	5	.583	13	–	9	.591
Missouri	7	–	5	.583	14	–	10	.583
Iowa State	6	–	6	.500	15	–	8	.652
Nebraska	5	–	7	.417	11	–	13	.458
Kansas	4	–	8	.333	9	–	15	.375
Colorado	4	–	8	.333	7	–	14	.333

The 1947–48 Iowa State Cyclones men's basketball team represented Iowa State University during the 1947–48 NCAA men's basketball season. The Cyclones were coached by Clay Sutherland, who was in his first season with the Cyclones. They played their home games at the Iowa State Armory in Ames, Iowa.

They finished the season 14–9, 6–6 in Big Six play to finish in fourth place.

== Roster ==
1947–48 Iowa State Cyclones men's basketball team
Players
Coaches

Pos.	#	Name	Height	Weight	Year	Hometown
F	21	Gay Anderson	6 ft 5 in (1.96 m)	—	Fr	Council Bluffs, Iowa
G		Bill Block	—	—	Sr	Muscatine, Iowa
G		Don Ferguson	5 ft 7 in (1.7 m)	—		Ottumwa, Iowa
G		Clayton Johnson	—	—
F		Lloyd Kester	6 ft 0 in (1.83 m)	—		Ames, Iowa
F		Jim Kilgariff	—	—
F		Bob McLuen	6 ft 1 in (1.85 m)	—		Ashton, Iowa
G		Ron Norman (C)	—	—		Fairfield, Iowa
G		Gene Oulman	—	—
F		Don Paulsen	6 ft 4 in (1.93 m)	—		Huxley, Iowa
G		Bob Petersen	5 ft 8 in (1.73 m)	—		Harlan, Iowa
F		Therol Peterson	6 ft 1 in (1.85 m)	—		Clinton, Iowa
G		Dudley Ruisch	6 ft 4 in (1.93 m)	—		Sioux City, Iowa
F		Leo Schneider	6 ft 3 in (1.91 m)	—		Rock Island, Illinois
G		John Sheperd	6 ft 1 in (1.85 m)	—		Gary, Indiana
F		Ray Wehde	—	—		Holstein, Iowa
F		Roy Wehde	—	—		Holstein, Iowa

Head coach

- Clay Sutherland

Assistant coach(es)

Cap Timm

Legend

- (C) Team captain
- (S) Suspended
- (I) Ineligible
- (W) Walk-on
- Injured
- Current redshirt

== Schedule and results ==
Date time, TV	Rank^{#}	Opponent^{#}	Result	Record	Site city, state
Regular season
December 8, 1947*; 7:30 pm		Simpson	W 43–29	1–0	Iowa State Armory; Ames, Iowa
December 13, 1947*; 7:30 pm		Morningside	W 68–50	2–0	Iowa State Armory; Ames, Iowa
December 18, 1947*; 8:00 pm		vs. Oklahoma State; Big Six Holiday Tournament Quarterfinals	L 33–44	2–1	Municipal Auditorium; Kansas City, Missouri
December 19, 1947*; 2:00 pm		vs. Missouri; Big Six Holiday Tournament Consolation Semifinals	L 40–48	2–2	Municipal Auditorium; Kansas City, Missouri
December 20, 1947*; 2:00 pm		vs. Colorado; Big Six Holiday Tournament Seventh Place	W 49–40	3–2	Municipal Auditorium; Kansas City, Missouri
December 29, 1947*; 8:30 pm		Michigan	W 53–51	4–2	Iowa State Armory (6,500); Ames, Iowa
December 30, 1947*; 8:30 pm		Michigan	W 47–41	5–2	Iowa State Armory; Ames, Iowa
January 3, 1948*; 8:15 pm		at Drake; Iowa Big Four	W 49–47	6–2	Drake Fieldhouse; Des Moines, Iowa
January 6, 1948; 7:30 pm		Nebraska	W 55–44	7–2 (1–0)	Iowa State Armory; Ames, Iowa
January 10, 1948; 7:30 pm		Missouri	W 53–45	8–2 (2–0)	Iowa State Armory; Ames, Iowa
January 12, 1948*; 7:00 pm		at Iowa State Teacher's College; Iowa Big Four	W 52–47	9–2	Men's Gym; Cedar Falls, Iowa
January 17, 1948; 8:00 pm		at Oklahoma	L 39–66	9–3 (2–1)	OU Field House; Norman, Oklahoma
January 19, 1948		at Kansas State	L 42–61	9–4 (2–2)	Nichols Hall; Manhattan, Kansas
January 22, 1948*; 7:30 pm		Drake; Iowa Big Four	L 49–60	9–5	Iowa State Armory; Ames, Iowa
January 31, 1948		at Colorado	W 39–38	10–5 (3–2)	Balch Fieldhouse; Boulder, Colorado
February 7, 1948; 7:30 pm		Colorado	L 32–33	10–6 (3–3)	Iowa State Armory; Ames, Iowa
February 13, 1948; 7:30 pm		Kansas	W 52–50	11–6 (4–3)	Iowa State Armory; Ames, Iowa
February 16, 1948; 8:00 pm		at Missouri	W 48–47	12–6 (5–3)	Brewer Fieldhouse; Columbia, Missouri
February 21, 1948		at Nebraska	L 57–62	12–7 (5–4)	Nebraska Coliseum; Lincoln, Nebraska
February 24, 1948; 7:30 pm		Kansas State	L 48–54	12–8 (5–5)	Iowa State Armory; Ames, Iowa
February 28, 1948; 7:30 pm		Oklahoma	W 55–35	13–8 (6–5)	Iowa State Armory; Ames, Iowa
March 5, 1948*; 7:30 pm		South Dakota	W 72–50	14–8	Iowa State Armory; Ames, Iowa
March 12, 1948; 7:30 pm		at Kansas	L 54–61	14–9 (6–6)	Hoch Auditorium; Lawrence, Kansas
*Non-conference game. ^{#}Rankings from AP poll. (#) Tournament seedings in parentheses. All times are in Central Time.
