= 1947–48 UCLA Bruins men's basketball team =

American college basketball season

1947–48 UCLA Bruins men's basketball
- Conference: Pacific Coast Conference
- South
- Record: 12–13 (3–9 PCC)
- Head coach: Wilbur Johns (9th season)
- Assistant coach: Bill Putnam
- Home arena: Men's Gym

1947–48 Pacific Coast Conference men's basketball standings
	Conf.				Overall
Team	W		L	PCT	W		L	PCT
North
Washington †	10	–	6	.625	23	–	11	.676
Oregon State	10	–	6	.625	21	–	13	.618
Washington State	9	–	7	.563	19	–	10	.655
Oregon	8	–	8	.500	18	–	11	.621
Idaho	3	–	13	.188	17	–	15	.531
South
California	11	–	1	.917	25	–	9	.735
USC	7	–	5	.583	14	–	10	.583
UCLA	3	–	9	.250	12	–	13	.480
Stanford	3	–	9	.250	15	–	11	.577
† Conference playoff series winner

The 1947–48 UCLA Bruins men's basketball team represented the University of California, Los Angeles during the 1947–48 NCAA men's basketball season and were members of the Pacific Coast Conference. The Bruins were led by ninth year head coach Wilbur Johns. They finished the regular season with a record of 12–13 and were third in the PCC southern division with a record of 3–9. It was also the Bruins' final season before the legendary John Wooden took over as the head coach the next season.

== Previous season ==
The Bruins finished the regular season with a record of 18–7 and won the PCC southern division with a record of 9–3.

== Roster ==
1947–48 UCLA Bruins men's basketball team
Players
Coaches

Pos.	#	Name	Height	Weight	Year	Hometown
C	35	Ray Alba	—	—
F		Jim Baker	—	—
F	55	Eldon Bennett	—	—
G	53	Wayne Boulding	—	—
F	56	Guy Buccola	—	—	Jr
F	57	Chuck Clustka	—	—	Jr
F	76	Ernie Johnson	—	—	So	Berkeley, California
G	10	Dave Minor	—	—
G	78	Ron Pearson	—	—	Jr
G	3	Bill Rankin	—	—	Sr
F	54	Alan Sawyer	6 ft 5 in (1.96 m)	195 lb (88 kg)	So	Long Beach, California
G	74	Don Seidel	—	—
G	73	George Stanich	—	—	So	Sacramento, California
F	6	John Stanich (C)	—	—		Sacramento, California
F	12	Dick West	—	—	Sr
C	32	Gene Williams	—	—	So

Head coach

Wilbur Johns (UCLA)

Assistant coach(es)

Bill Putnam

Legend

- (C) Team captain
- (S) Suspended
- (I) Ineligible
- (W) Walk-on
- Injured
- Current redshirt

Roster
Last update: 30 January 2018

== Schedule ==
Date time, TV	Rank^{#}	Opponent^{#}	Result	Record	Site city, state
Regular Season
November 28, 1947*		Loyola Marymount	W 49–34	1–0	Men's Gym; Los Angeles, CA
November 29, 1947*		Loyola Marymount	W 53–24	2–0	Men's Gym; Los Angeles, CA
December 5, 1957*		Santa Clara	W 47–42	3–0	Men's Gym; Los Angeles, CA
December 6, 1947*		Santa Clara	L 50–55	3–1	Men's Gym; Los Angeles, CA
December 12, 1947*		at Nevada	W 51–38	4–1	Reno, NV
December 13, 1947*		at Oakland Bittners	L 63–67	4–2	Oakland, CA
December 16, 1947*		20th Century Fox	W 67–47	5–2	Men's Gym; Los Angeles, CA
December 19, 1947*		Baylor	L 42–45	5–3	Men's Gym; Los Angeles, CA
December 20, 1947*		Pacific	W 58–41	6–3	Men's Gym; Los Angeles, CA
December 27, 1947*		at St. Joseph's	W 64–54	7–3	Philadelphia, PA
December 29, 1947*		at Long Island	W 66–64	8–3	Long Island, NY
January 1, 1948*		at Cornell	W 50–47	9–3	Ithaca, NY; Barton Hall
January 9, 1948		California	L 49–58	9–4 (0–1)	Men's Gym; Los Angeles, CA
January 10, 1948		Stanford	W 55–47	10–4 (1–1)	Stanford Pavilion; Stanford, CA
January 16, 1948		USC	L 42–56	10–5 (1–2)	Men's Gym; Los Angeles, CA
January 17, 1948		at USC	W 51–50	11–5 (2–2)	Shrine Auditorium; Los Angeles, CA
January 24, 1948		at Sacramento Senators	L 57–59	11–6	Sacramento, CA
February 13, 1948		at Stanford	L 47–64	11–7 (2–3)	Stanford Pavilion; Stanford, CA
February 14, 1948		at California	L 44–62	11–8 (2–4)	Men's Gym; Berkeley, CA
February 20, 1948		Stanford	L 47–55	11–9 (2–5)	Men's Gym; Los Angeles, CA
February 21, 1948		California	L 39–44	11–10 (2–6)	Men's Gym; Los Angeles, CA
February 27, 1948		at California	L 37–41	11–11 (2–7)	Men's Gym; Berkeley, CA
February 28, 1948		at Stanford	W 48–46	12–11 (3–7)	Stanford Pavilion; Stanford, CA
March 5, 1948		USC	L 57–68	12–12 (3–8)	Men's Gym; Los Angeles, CA
March 6, 1948		at USC	L 46–62	12–13 (3–9)	Shrine Auditorium; Los Angeles, CA
*Non-conference game. ^{#}Rankings from AP Poll. (#) Tournament seedings in parentheses. All times are in Pacific Time.
