= Governor's Victory Bell =

College football rivalry

- Minnesota Golden Gophers Penn State Nittany Lions
- Sport: Football
- First meeting: September 4, 1993; Penn State 38–20
- Latest meeting: November 14, 2026; Penn State 42–14
- Next meeting: TBD
- Stadiums: Beaver Stadium; Hubert H. Humphrey Metrodome; TCF Bank Stadium/Huntington Bank Stadium
- Trophy: Governor's Victory Bell

Statistics
- Total meetings: 18
- All-time series: Penn State leads 12–6 (.667)
- Largest victory: Penn State, 56–3 (1994)
- Longest win streak: Penn State, 4 (1993–1998, 2005–2010); Minnesota, 4 (1999–2004)
- Current win streak: Penn State, 3 (2022–present)

The Governor's Victory Bell is an American college rivalry trophy contested between the Minnesota Golden Gophers of the University of Minnesota, and the Penn State Nittany Lions of the Pennsylvania State University.

Both teams are members of the Big Ten Conference. Minnesota is a founding member, since 1896, while long-independent Penn State joined in 1993. The Governor's Victory Bell trophy was created to commemorate Penn States' first Big Ten conference game, against Minnesota, on September 4, 1993.

The Governor's Victory Bell, alongside the Land Grant Trophy, is one of Penn State's two traveling rivalry trophies. It is Minnesota's fourth official trophy, behind the Little Brown Jug, Floyd of Rosedale, and Paul Bunyan's Axe, and ranks the Golden Gophers first in the Big Ten for number of in-conference rivalry trophies.

Locations of Minnesota and Penn State

== History ==
Minnesota and Penn State had never played a game prior to the later team's entrance into the Big Ten in 1993. The long-independent Nittany Lions were matched with the Golden Gophers for their first-ever in-conference game, and their first game of the 1993 season, on September 4 at Beaver Stadium.

A trophy to mark the occasion was established by Minnesota Governor Arne Carlson and Pennsylvania Governor Robert Casey, represented at the time by acting Governor Mark Singel. Singel presented an artist's conception of the prospective Governor's Victory Bell prior to the game.

In 2013 Minnesota reclaimed the trophy after an interrupted four-game, nine-year losing streak, having last won vs. Penn State in 2004. The team accidentally broke the trophy in the ensuing celebration.

In 2019, both teams were undefeated with Penn State ranked #4 and Minnesota #17. This was the first matchup in which both teams were ranked. The game went down to the wire and ended with a dramatic interception by the Gophers in their own end zone to win 31–26. Later that month the Associated Press listed the matchup as a "Forced Rivalry" in their evaluation of the Big Ten's rivalries and 17 trophy games.

The Big Ten conference expanded in 2024, adding four teams from the Pac-12 conference. Tom Fornelli for CBS Sports listed the Minnesota-Penn State game last in a new ranking of the league's 21 football rivalries, stating "This game has a trophy, so I included it in the rankings, but I don't know how many Minnesota or Penn State students are even aware that this is considered a rivalry."

== Game results ==
Rankings are from the AP Poll.

Minnesota victories	Penn State victories

No.	Date	Location	Winner	Score
1	September 4, 1993	University Park, PA	No. 17 Penn State	38–20
2	September 3, 1994	Minneapolis, MN	No. 9 Penn State	56–3
3	October 18, 1997	University Park, PA	No. 1 Penn State	16–15
4	October 10, 1998	Minneapolis, MN	No. 13 Penn State	27–17
5	November 6, 1999	University Park, PA	Minnesota	24–23
6	October 7, 2000	Minneapolis, MN	Minnesota	25–16
7	September 27, 2003	University Park, PA	No. 24 Minnesota	20–14
8	October 2, 2004	Minneapolis, MN	No. 18 Minnesota	16–7
9	October 1, 2005	University Park, PA	Penn State	44–14
10	October 7, 2006	Minneapolis, MN	Penn State	28–27^{OT}
11	October 17, 2009	University Park, PA	No. 14 Penn State	20–0
12	October 23, 2010	Minneapolis, MN	Penn State	33–21
13	October 9, 2013	Minneapolis, MN	Minnesota	24–10
14	October 1, 2016	University Park, PA	Penn State	29–26^{OT}
15	November 9, 2019	Minneapolis, MN	No. 17 Minnesota	31–26
16	November 22, 2022	University Park, PA	No. 16 Penn State	45–17
17	November 23, 2024	Minneapolis, MN	No. 4 Penn State	26–25
18	November 14, 2026	University Park, PA	Penn State	42–14
Series: Penn State leads 12–6

== See also ==
- List of NCAA college football rivalry games
