= 1947–48 Iowa Hawkeyes men's basketball team =

American college basketball season

1947–48 Iowa Hawkeyes men's basketball
- Conference: Big Ten Conference
- Record: 15–4 (8–4 Big Ten)
- Head coach: Pops Harrison (6th season)
- Home arena: Iowa Field House

1947–48 Big Nine Conference men's basketball standings
	Conf.				Overall
Team	W		L	PCT	W		L	PCT
Michigan	10	–	2	.833	16	–	6	.727
Iowa	8	–	4	.667	15	–	4	.789
Illinois	7	–	5	.583	15	–	5	.750
Wisconsin	7	–	5	.583	12	–	8	.600
Purdue	6	–	6	.500	11	–	9	.550
Minnesota	5	–	7	.417	10	–	10	.500
Ohio State	5	–	7	.417	10	–	10	.500
Indiana	3	–	9	.250	8	–	12	.400
Northwestern	3	–	9	.250	6	–	14	.300

The 1947–48 Iowa Hawkeyes men's basketball team represented the University of Iowa in intercollegiate basketball during the 1947–48 season. The team was led by sixth-year head coach Pops Harrison and played their home games at the Iowa Field House. The Hawkeyes finished the season with a 15–4 record (8–4 in Big Ten) and in second place in the Big Ten standings.

== Roster ==
1947–48 Iowa Hawkeyes men's basketball team
Players
Coaches

Pos.	#	Name	Height	Weight	Year	Hometown
F	4	Charlie Mason	—	—	Jr	–	–
F	5	Floyd Magnusson	—	—	Jr	–	–
G	7	Jack Spencer	—	—	Sr	–	–
C	11	Roger Finley	—	—	So	–	–
F	17	Murray Wier	5 ft 9 in (1.75 m)	155 lb (70 kg)	Sr	Muscatine HS	Muscatine, IA
C	22	Leonard Metcalfe	—	—	Sr	–	–
G	23	Bob Schulz	—	—	So	–	–
F	26	Bob Vollers	—	—	So	–	–

Head coach

- Pops Harrison (Iowa)

Assistant coach(es)

Legend

- (C) Team captain
- (S) Suspended
- (I) Ineligible
- (W) Walk-on
- Injured
- Current redshirt

== Schedule/results ==
Date time, TV	Rank^{#}	Opponent^{#}	Result	Record	Site (attendance) city, state
Non-conference
Dec 1, 1947*		Carleton	W 82–43	1–0	Iowa Field House; Iowa City, Iowa
Dec 6, 1947*		South Dakota	W 66–30	2–0	Iowa Field House; Iowa City, Iowa
Dec 13, 1947*		North Dakota	W 58–47	3–0	Iowa Field House; Iowa City, Iowa
Dec 20, 1947*		at Washington (MO)	W 44–41	4–0	WU Field House; St. Louis, Missouri
Dec 31, 1947*		Harvard	W 61–41	5–0	Iowa Field House; Iowa City, Iowa
Jan 3, 1948*		Princeton	W 52–40	6–0	Iowa Field House; Iowa City, Iowa
Big Nine Conference
Jan 5, 1948; 7:00 p.m.		at Ohio State	W 49–41	7–0 (1–0)	Ohio Expo Center Coliseum; Columbus, Ohio
Jan 10, 1948		Purdue	W 60–49	8–0 (2–0)	Iowa Field House; Iowa City, Iowa
Jan 12, 1948		at Wisconsin	L 35–51	8–1 (2–1)	Wisconsin Field House; Madison, Wisconsin
Jan 10, 1948		Indiana	W 61–52	9–1 (3–1)	Iowa Field House; Iowa City, Iowa
Jan 19, 1948		at Minnesota	L 56–72	9–2 (3–2)	Williams Arena; Minneapolis, Minnesota
Jan 31, 1948*		Regis	W 76–48	10–2	Iowa Field House; Iowa City, Iowa
Feb 2, 1948		Northwestern	W 57–54 ^{OT}	11–2 (4–2)	Iowa Field House; Iowa City, Iowa
Feb 7, 1948		at Purdue	W 41–33	12–2 (5–2)	Mackey Arena; West Lafayette, Indiana
Feb 9, 1948		Illinois; Rivalry	W 70–61	13–2 (6–2)	Iowa Field House (16,048); Iowa City, Iowa
Feb 14, 1948		at Indiana	L 47–49	13–3 (6–3)	The Fieldhouse; Bloomington, Indiana
Feb 21, 1948		Wisconsin	W 62–40	14–3 (7–3)	Iowa Field House; Iowa City, Iowa
Feb 28, 1948		Minnesota	W 54–50	15–3 (8–3)	Iowa Field House; Iowa City, Iowa
Mar 1, 1948		at Michigan	L 35–51	15–4 (8–4)	Fielding H. Yost Field House; Ann Arbor, Michigan
*Non-conference game. ^{#}Rankings from AP Poll. (#) Tournament seedings in parentheses.

== Honors and awards ==
- Murray Wier – Chicago Tribune Silver Basketball, Consensus First-team All-American, NCAA scoring leader

== BAA draft ==
Round	Pick	Player	Team
–	–	Murray Wier	Fort Wayne Pistons
