= 1947–48 Georgia Bulldogs basketball team =

American college basketball season

1947–48 Georgia Bulldogs basketball
- Conference: Southeastern Conference
- Record: 18–10 (6–8 SEC)
- Head coach: Ralph Jordan (2nd season)
- Captain: Morgan Harvill
- Home arena: Woodruff Hall

1947–48 Southeastern Conference men's basketball standings
| | Conf. | | | | Overall |
| Team | W | | L | PCT | W | | L | PCT |
|---|---|---|---|---|---|---|---|---|
| Kentucky † | 9 | – | 0 | 1.000 | 36 | – | 3 | .923 |
| Tulane | 13 | – | 1 | .929 | 23 | – | 3 | .885 |
| Tennessee | 10 | – | 2 | .833 | 20 | – | 5 | .800 |
| Alabama | 8 | – | 8 | .500 | 15 | – | 12 | .556 |
| Auburn | 7 | – | 7 | .500 | 12 | – | 10 | .545 |
| Georgia | 6 | – | 8 | .429 | 18 | – | 10 | .643 |
| Florida | 5 | – | 7 | .417 | 15 | – | 10 | .600 |
| Georgia Tech | 6 | – | 10 | .375 | 12 | – | 16 | .429 |
| Mississippi State | 6 | – | 10 | .375 | 6 | – | 12 | .333 |
| Ole Miss | 5 | – | 9 | .357 | 11 | – | 12 | .478 |
| LSU | 4 | – | 10 | .286 | 8 | – | 18 | .308 |
| Vanderbilt | 4 | – | 11 | .267 | 8 | – | 14 | .364 |
† Regular-season championship and SEC Tournament winner

The 1947–48 Georgia Bulldogs basketball team represented the University of Georgia as a member of the Southeastern Conference (SEC) during the 1947–48 NCAA men's basketball season. Led by second-year head coach Ralph Jordan, the Bulldogs compiled an overall record of 18–10 with a mark of 6–8 conference play, placing sixth in the SEC. The team captain was Morgan Harvill.

== Roster ==
1947–48 Georgia Bulldogs men's basketball team
Players
Coaches

| Pos. | # | Name | Height | Weight | Year | Previous school | Hometown |
|---|---|---|---|---|---|---|---|
| F | | Bob Healey | 6 ft 2 in (1.88 m) | — | Jr |
| F | | Earl Davis | 6 ft 2 in (1.88 m) | — | So |
| C | | Bob Schloss | 6 ft 8 in (2.03 m) | — | So |
| G | | Joe Jordan | 5 ft 9 in (1.75 m) | — | So |
| G | | E.L. Rainey | 6 ft 0 in (1.83 m) | — | Jr |
| G | | J.B. Farr | — | — |
| C | | Al Fabian | — | — |
| F | | Dick Thomas | 6 ft 0 in (1.83 m) | — | So |
| G | | Ryle Tatum | 6 ft 0 in (1.83 m) | — |
| F | | John Davis | — | — |
| C | | Jesse Fox | — | — |
| G | | Minton Williams | 6 ft 0 in (1.83 m) | — |
| F | | Gene Lorendo | — | — |

Head coach

Ralph Jordan

Assistant coach(es)

Legend

- (C) Team captain
- (S) Suspended
- (I) Ineligible
- (W) Walk-on
- Injured
- Current redshirt

== Schedule ==
| Date time, TV | Opponent | Result | Record | Site city, state |
|---|---|---|---|---|
| 12/5/1947 | Furman | W 74-66 | 1–0 | Athens, GA |
| 12/6/1947 | Erskine | W 81-37 | 2–0 | Athens, GA |
| 12/8/1947 | Mercer | W 80-62 | 3–0 | Athens, GA |
| 12/11/1947 | at Clemson | W 61-52 | 4–0 | |
| 12/12/1947 | at Erskine | W 71-37 | 5–0 | |
| 12/18/1947 | Chattanooga | W 62-34 | 6–0 | Athens, GA |
| 12/19/1947 | Virginia | W 62-55 | 7–0 | Athens, GA |
| 1/6/1948 | at Furman | W 49-44 | 8–0 | |
| 1/9/1948 | Alabama | W 47-44 | 9–0 | Athens, GA |
| 1/10/1948 | Ole Miss | W 74-66 | 10–0 | Athens, GA |
| 1/12/1948 | South Carolina | W 70-57 | 11–0 | Athens, GA |
| 1/16/1948 | at Auburn | L 41-52 | 11–1 | |
| 1/17/1948 | at Alabama | L 47-48 | 11–2 | |
| 1/20/1948 | Kentucky | L 51-88 | 11–3 | Athens, GA |
| 1/23/1948 | at Florida | W 55-52 | 12–3 | |
| 1/24/1948 | at Florida | L 38-46 | 12–4 | |
| 1/26/1948 | Tennessee | L 64-70 | 12–5 | Athens, GA |
| 1/30/1948 | at Mercer | W 55-53 | 13–5 | |
| 2/3/1948 | Georgia Tech | L 58-68 | 13–6 | Athens, GA |
| 2/7/1948 | at Tennessee | L 60-69 | 13–7 | |
| 2/9/1948 | at Chattanooga | W 73-55 | 14–7 | |
| 2/12/1948 | Georgia Tech | L 64-73 | 14–8 | Athens, GA |
| 2/14/1948 | Florida | W 56-44 | 15–8 | Athens, GA |
| 2/18/1948 | Georgia Tech | W 65-58 | 16–8 | Athens, GA |
| 2/21/1948 | Auburn | W 74-36 | 17–8 | Athens, GA |
| 2/25/1948 | at South Carolina | L 61-64 | 17–9 | |
| 2/28/1948 | Clemson | W 81-35 | 18–9 | Athens, GA |
| 3/4/1948 | Georgia Tech | L 57-60 | 18–10 | Athens, GA |
*Non-conference game. (#) Tournament seedings in parentheses.
