= Joseph Niland =

Biographical details
- Born: Tonawanda, New York, U.S.
- Died: February 18, 2007; Buffalo, New York, U.S.

Playing career
- 1938–1942: Canisius

Coaching career (HC unless noted)
- 1947–1948: Gannon
- 1948–1953: Canisius

Head coaching record
- Overall: 84–75

Accomplishments and honors

Awards
- Canisius College Sports Hall of Fame inductee (1964); Greater Buffalo Sports Hall of Fame inductee (2001)

Joseph Patrick Niland (died February 18, 2007) is an American former basketball coach and player at Canisius College.

== Early life ==
Niland played college basketball at Canisius from 1938 to 1942, graduating in 1942 as an All-American. From 1943 to 1945, Niland served under General George S. Patton in the US Army's 20th Armored Division during World War II.

== Coaching ==
Niland was the men's basketball coach at Gannon College during the 1947–48 season, amassing an 8–14 record. He was the head basketball coach at Canisius College from 1948 to 1953, compiling an overall record of 76–61.

== Honors ==
Niland was elected to the Canisius College Sports Hall of Fame in 1964, and the Greater Buffalo Sports Hall of Fame in 2001.

== Personal life ==
Niland is the father of college coaches Joseph Niland Jr and David Niland and uncle of current University of Michigan men's basketball head coach John Beilein.

== Head coaching record ==
Record table
Season	Team	Overall	Conference	Standing	Postseason
Canisius Golden Griffins () (1948–1953)
1947–48	Canisius	4–8			
1948–49	Canisius	16–12			
1949–50	Canisius	17–8			
1950–51	Canisius	15–10			
1951–52	Canisius	15–9			
1952–53	Canisius	9–14			
Canisius:		76–61 (.555)			
Total:		76–61 (.555)			
National champion Postseason invitational champion Conference regular season champion Conference regular season and conference tournament champion Division regular season champion Division regular season and conference tournament champion Conference tournament champion
