= 1947–48 Kansas Jayhawks men's basketball team =

American college basketball season

1947–48 Kansas Jayhawks men's basketball
- Conference: Big Eight Conference|Big Six Conference
- Record: 9–15 (4–8 Big 7)
- Head coach: Phog Allen (31st season)
- Captain: Otto Schnellbacher
- Home arena: Hoch Auditorium

1947–48 Big Seven Conference men's basketball standings
	Conf.				Overall
Team	W		L	PCT	W		L	PCT
Kansas State	9	–	3	.750	22	–	6	.786
Oklahoma	7	–	5	.583	13	–	9	.591
Missouri	7	–	5	.583	14	–	10	.583
Iowa State	6	–	6	.500	15	–	8	.652
Nebraska	5	–	7	.417	11	–	13	.458
Kansas	4	–	8	.333	9	–	15	.375
Colorado	4	–	8	.333	7	–	14	.333

The 1947–48 Kansas Jayhawks men's basketball team represented the University of Kansas during the 1947–48 college men's basketball season.

== Roster ==
- Otto Schnellbacher
- Eugene Barr
- Gilbert Stramel
- Jack Eskridge
- John Dewell
- Myron Enns
- Guy Mabry
- Jerry Waugh
- Claude Houchin
- William Sapp
- Charles Penny
- Maurice Martin
- Harold England

== Schedule ==
Date time, TV	Rank^{#}	Opponent^{#}	Result	Record	Site city, state
December 13*		at Emporia State	L 44–67	0-1	William L. White Auditorium; Emporia, KS
December 18		vs. Colorado	W 49–39	1-1	Municipal Auditorium; Kansas City, MO
December 19		vs. Kansas State; Sunflower Showdown	L 42–56	1-2	Municipal Auditorium; Kansas City, MO
December 20		vs. Nebraska	W 64–60	2-2	Municipal Auditorium; Kansas City, MO
December 23*		Notre Dame	L 49–51	2-3	Hoch Auditorium; Lawrence, KS
December 26		at San Francisco	W 57–43	3-3	Kezar Pavilion; San Francisco, CA
December 29*		at Oregon	L 61–66	3-4	McArthur Court; Eugene, OR
December 30*		at Oregon	L 53–61	3-5	McArthur Court; Eugene, OR
January 1		at Nevada	W 52–45	4-5	University Gymnasium; Reno, NV
January 6		Oklahoma	W 39–38	5-5 (1-0)	Hoch Auditorium; Lawrence, KS
January 10		Colorado	W 57–44	6-5 (2-0)	Hoch Auditorium; Lawrence, KS
January 14		Drake	W 72–42	7-5	Hoch Auditorium; Lawrence, KS
January 17		at Missouri; Border War	W 58–46	8-5 (3-0)	Brewer Fieldhouse; Columbia, MO
January 21*		Oklahoma A&M	L 35–47	8-6	Hoch Auditorium; Lawrence, KS
February 7		Nebraska	L 57–61	8-7 (3-1)	Hoch Auditorium; Lawrence, KS
February 9		Missouri; Border War	L 39–42	8-8 (3-2)	Hoch Auditorium; Lawrence, KS
February 13		at Iowa State	L 50–52	8-9 (3-3)	The Armory; Ames, IA
February 18		at Kansas State; Sunflower Showdown	L 29–48	8-10 (3-4)	Nichols Hall; Manhattan, KS
February 21		at Oklahoma	L 46–50	8-11 (3-5)	Field House; Norman, OK
March 1		Kansas State; Sunflower Showdown	L 60–61	8-12 (3-6)	Hoch Auditorium; Lawrence, KS
March 4*		at Oklahoma A&M	L 25–37	8-13	Gallagher-Iba Arena; Stillwater, OK
March 6		at Nebraska	L 65–70	8-14 (3-7)	Nebraska Coliseum; Lincoln, NE
March 8		at Colorado	L 60–77	8-15 (3-8)	Balch Fieldhouse; Boulder, CO
March 12		Iowa State	W 61–54	9-15 (4-8)	Hoch Auditorium; Lawrence, KS
*Non-conference game. ^{#}Rankings from AP Poll. (#) Tournament seedings in parentheses.
