= List of Big Ten Conference football rivalry games =

== Big Ten conference rivalry games ==
Game	Trophy	Team	Team	First Year	Latest Year	Meetings
Illinois–Indiana		Illinois	Indiana	1899	2025	74
Illinois–Iowa		Illinois	Iowa	1899	2023	79
Illinois–Northwestern	Land of Lincoln Trophy	Illinois	Northwestern	1892	2022	116
Illinois–Ohio State	Illibuck	Illinois	Ohio State	1902	2017	103
Illinois–Purdue	Purdue Cannon	Illinois	Purdue	1890	2022	98
Indiana–Michigan State	Old Brass Spittoon	Indiana	Michigan State	1922	2022	69
Indiana–Purdue	Old Oaken Bucket	Indiana	Purdue	1891	2022	124
Iowa–Minnesota	Floyd of Rosedale	Iowa	Minnesota	1891	2024	118
Iowa–Nebraska	Heroes Trophy	Iowa	Nebraska	1891	2024	53
Iowa–Wisconsin	Heartland Trophy	Iowa	Wisconsin	1894	2025	96
Maryland–Penn State		Maryland	Penn State	1917	2022	46
Michigan State–Penn State	Land Grant Trophy	Michigan State	Penn State	1914	2022	37
Michigan–Michigan State	Paul Bunyan Trophy	Michigan	Michigan State	1898	2023	116
Michigan–Minnesota	Little Brown Jug	Michigan	Minnesota	1892	2024	106
Michigan-Northwestern	George Jewett Trophy	Michigan	Northwestern	1892	2021	76
The Game		Michigan	Ohio State	1897	2023	119
Minnesota–Nebraska	$5 Bits of Broken Chair Trophy	Minnesota	Nebraska	1900	2025	64
Minnesota–Penn State	Governor's Victory Bell	Minnesota	Penn State	1993	2024	17
Minnesota–Wisconsin	Paul Bunyan's Axe (replaced The Slab of Bacon Trophy)	Minnesota	Wisconsin	1890	2024	134
Nebraska–Wisconsin	Freedom Trophy	Nebraska	Wisconsin	1901	2022	16
Ohio State-Penn State		Ohio State	Penn State	1912	2022	38
Oregon–Washington		Oregon	Washington	1900	2025	117
Oregon–USC		Oregon	USC	1915	2025	65
UCLA–USC	Victory Bell	UCLA	USC	1929	2022	92

== Big Ten non-conference rivalry games ==
Game	Trophy	Team	Team	First Year	Latest Year	Meetings
Alabama–Penn State		Alabama	Penn State	1959	2011	15
Cal–UCLA		Cal	UCLA	1933	2021	92
Chicago–Michigan		Chicago	Michigan	1892	1936	26
Chicago–Purdue		Chicago	Purdue	1892	1936	42
Colorado–Nebraska	Bison Head Trophy (Lost)	Colorado	Nebraska	1898	2024	73
Crab Bowl Classic	The Crab Bowl	Maryland	Navy	1905	2010	21
Illinois–Missouri		Illinois	Missouri	1896	2010	24
Indiana–Kentucky	Bourbon Barrel	Indiana	Kentucky	1893	2005	36
Iowa–Iowa State	Cy-Hawk Trophy	Iowa	Iowa State	1894	2025	72
Maryland–Virginia		Maryland	Virginia	1919	2013	78
Maryland–West Virginia		Maryland	West Virginia	1919	2021	52
Michigan State–Notre Dame	Megaphone Trophy	Michigan State	Notre Dame	1897	2017	78
Michigan–Notre Dame		Michigan	Notre Dame	1887	2019	44
Missouri–Nebraska	Victory Bell	Missouri	Nebraska	1892	2010	104
Nebraska–Oklahoma		Nebraska	Oklahoma	1912	2021	86
Northwestern–Notre Dame	Shillelagh (Lost)	Northwestern	Notre Dame	1889	2018	49
Notre Dame–Purdue	Shillelagh Trophy	Notre Dame	Purdue	1896	2021	86
Notre Dame–USC	Jeweled Shillelagh	Notre Dame	USC	1926	2023	94
Oregon–Oregon State	Platypus Trophy	Oregon	Oregon State	1894	2024	128
Oregon–Saint Mary's	The Governors' Perpetual Trophy	Oregon	Saint Mary's	1929	1950	10
Penn State–Pittsburgh		Penn State	Pittsburgh	1893	2019	100
Penn State–Syracuse		Penn State	Syracuse	1922	2013	71
Penn State–West Virginia		Penn State	West Virginia	1904	1992	59
Stanford–USC		Stanford	USC	1905	2023	102
Washington–Washington State	Apple Cup	Washington	Washington State	1900	2024	116
