= 1947–48 Indiana Hoosiers men's basketball team =

American college basketball season

1947–48 Indiana Hoosiers men's basketball
- Conference: Big Ten Conference
- Record: 8–12 (3–9 Big Nine)
- Head coach: Branch McCracken (7th season)
- Captain: Ward Williams
- Home arena: The Fieldhouse

1947–48 Big Nine Conference men's basketball standings
	Conf.				Overall
Team	W		L	PCT	W		L	PCT
Michigan	10	–	2	.833	16	–	6	.727
Iowa	8	–	4	.667	15	–	4	.789
Illinois	7	–	5	.583	15	–	5	.750
Wisconsin	7	–	5	.583	12	–	8	.600
Purdue	6	–	6	.500	11	–	9	.550
Minnesota	5	–	7	.417	10	–	10	.500
Ohio State	5	–	7	.417	10	–	10	.500
Indiana	3	–	9	.250	8	–	12	.400
Northwestern	3	–	9	.250	6	–	14	.300

The 1947–48 Indiana Hoosiers men's basketball team represented Indiana University. Their head coach was Branch McCracken, who was in his seventh year. The team played its home games in The Fieldhouse in Bloomington, Indiana, and was a member of the Big Nine Conference.

The Hoosiers finished the regular season with an overall record of 8–12 and a conference record of 3–9, finishing eighth in the Big Nine Conference. Indiana was not invited to participate in any postseason tournament.

== Roster ==
No.	Name	Position	Ht.	Year	Hometown
3	Jerry Stuteville	F	6–3	So.	Attica, Indiana
4	Gene Farris	F	6–1	So.	Campbellsburg, Indiana
5	Murray Mendenhall	G	5–9	So.	Fort Wayne, Indiana
6	Lou Watson	G	6–5	So.	Jeffersonville, Indiana
7	Don Ritter	G	5–10	Jr.	Aurora, Indiana
8	Stuart Chestnut	F	6–2	So.	Terre Haute, Indiana
10	John Wallace	F	6–3	Sr.	Richmond, Indiana
11	Lou Jensen	G	5–11	So.	New Albany, Indiana
12	Norbert Hermann	G	6–2	Sr.	Brownstown, Indiana
14	Ward Williams	C	6–3	Sr.	Colfax, Indiana
15	Bob Armstrong	C	6–4	So.	Fort Wayne, Indiana
18	Tom Schwartz	C	6–6	So.	Kokomo, Indiana
19	Charley Meyer	C	6–5	So.	Jeffersonville, Indiana
22	Jack Brown	F	6–3	So.	Bloomington, Indiana
34	Bob Lollar	F	6–2	Jr.	Indianapolis, Indiana
N/A	Joe Blumenthal	C	6–4	So.	Rochester, Indiana
N/A	Joe Gerich	F	6–1	So.	Francesville, Indiana
N/A	Byard Hey	G	6–1	So.	Fort Wayne, Indiana
N/A	Robert McKinnis	G	6–1	So.	Evansville, Indiana
N/A	Joe Piatek	C	6–3	So.	Hammond, Indiana
N/A	Robert Ritter	F	5–10	So.	Anderson, Indiana
N/A	Ed Stuteville	C	6–4	So.	Attica, Indiana
N/A	Lloyd Vogel	G	6–1	So.	Fort Wayne, Indiana

== Schedule/results ==
Date time, TV	Rank^{#}	Opponent^{#}	Result	Record	Site city, state
Regular season
12/6/1947*		DePauw	W 59–43	1–0	The Fieldhouse; Bloomington, Indiana
12/13/1947*		Carleton	W 76–42	2–0	The Fieldhouse; Bloomington, Indiana
12/15/1947*		at Kansas State	L 53–61	2–1	Nichols Hall; Manhattan, Kansas
12/18/1947*		Loyola (Chicago)	W 59–40	3–1	The Fieldhouse; Bloomington, Indiana
12/23/1947*		at Michigan State	L 60–64	3–2	Jenison Fieldhouse; East Lansing, Michigan
1/1/1948*		vs. Notre Dame; Hoosier Classic	W 72–46	4–2	Butler Fieldhouse; Indianapolis
1/2/1948*		at Butler; Hoosier Classic	L 51–64	4–3	Butler Fieldhouse; Indianapolis
1/5/1948		at Purdue; Rivalry	L 49–58	4–4 (0–1)	Lambert Fieldhouse; West Lafayette, Indiana
1/10/1948		Wisconsin	L 54–58	4–5 (0–2)	The Fieldhouse; Bloomington, Indiana
1/12/1948		Ohio State	W 71–54	5–5 (1–2)	The Fieldhouse; Bloomington, Indiana
1/17/1948		at Iowa	L 52–61	5–6 (1–3)	Iowa Field House; Iowa City, IA
1/19/1948		at Illinois; Rivalry	L 45–46	5–7 (1–4)	Huff Hall; Champaign, Illinois
1/24/1948		Minnesota	W 65–43	6–7 (2–4)	The Fieldhouse; Bloomington, Indiana
2/7/1948*		at Miami (OH)	W 57–48	7–7 (2–4)	Withrow Court; Oxford, Ohio
2/14/1948		Iowa	W 49–47	8–7 (3–4)	The Fieldhouse; Bloomington, Indiana
2/16/1948		at Michigan	L 54–66	8–8 (3–5)	Yost Field House; Ann Arbor, Michigan
2/21/1948		at Northwestern	L 42–47	8–9 (3–6)	Patten Gymnasium; Evanston, Illinois
2/23/1948		at Ohio State	L 45–60	8–10 (3–7)	Ohio Expo Center Coliseum; Columbus, Ohio
2/28/1948		Purdue; Rivalry	L 49–51	8–11 (3–8)	The Fieldhouse; Bloomington, Indiana
3/1/1948		Illinois; Rivalry	L 51–52	8–12 (3–9)	The Fieldhouse; Bloomington, Indiana
*Non-conference game. ^{#}Rankings from AP Poll. (#) Tournament seedings in parentheses.
