= 1947–48 Kansas State Wildcats men's basketball team =

American college basketball season

1947–48 Kansas State Wildcats men's basketball

Big Seven Champions

NCAA tournament, Final Four
- Conference: Big Six Conference
- Record: 22–6 (9–3 Big Six)
- Head coach: Jack Gardner (5th season)
- Assistant coach: Tex Winter (1st season)
- Home arena: Nichols Hall

1947–48 Big Seven Conference men's basketball standings
	Conf.				Overall
Team	W		L	PCT	W		L	PCT
Kansas State	9	–	3	.750	22	–	6	.786
Oklahoma	7	–	5	.583	13	–	9	.591
Missouri	7	–	5	.583	14	–	10	.583
Iowa State	6	–	6	.500	15	–	8	.652
Nebraska	5	–	7	.417	11	–	13	.458
Kansas	4	–	8	.333	9	–	15	.375
Colorado	4	–	8	.333	7	–	14	.333

The 1947–48 Kansas State Wildcats men's basketball team represented Kansas State University as a member of the Big Seven Conference during the 1947–48 NCAA men's basketball season. The head coach was Jack Gardner, who was in his fifth season at the helm. Playing out of the West region of the NCAA tournament, the Wildcats reached the first Final Four in school history. The team was defeated by Baylor in the National semifinals, lost in the National Third Place game to Holy Cross, and finished with a record of 22–6 (9–3 Big Seven).

The team played its home games at Nichols Hall in Manhattan, Kansas.

== Roster ==
1947–48 Kansas State Wildcats men's basketball team
Players	Coaches
Pos. / # / Name / Height / Weight / Year / Previous school / Hometown; G/F / / Howie Shannon / 6 ft 2 in (1.88 m) / 175 lb (79 kg) / Sr / Munday HS / Munday, Texas	Head coach: Jack Gardner (USC); Assistant coach(es): Tex Winter (USC); Legend: (C) Team captain; (S) Suspended; (I) Ineligible; (W) Walk-on; Injured; Current redshirt; Roster

== Schedule and results ==
Date time, TV	Rank^{#}	Opponent^{#}	Result	Record	Site city, state
Non-conference regular season
Dec 1, 1947*		Rockhurst	W 52–37	1–0	Nichols Hall; Manhattan, Kansas
Dec 4, 1947*		Culver-Stockton	W 55–34	2–0	Nichols Hall; Manhattan, Kansas
Dec 11, 1947*		TCU	W 75–17	3–0	Nichols Hall; Manhattan, Kansas
Dec 15, 1947*		vs. Indiana; Kansas City Tournament	W 61–53	4–0	Municipal Auditorium; Kansas City, Missouri
Dec 18, 1947*		vs. Oklahoma; Big Seven Holiday Tournament	W 55–48	5–0	Municipal Auditorium; Kansas City, Missouri
Dec 19, 1947*		vs. Kansas; Big Seven Holiday Tournament	W 56–42	6–0	Municipal Auditorium; Kansas City, Missouri
Dec 20, 1947*		vs. Oklahoma A&M; Big Seven Holiday Tournament	W 50–43	7–0	Municipal Auditorium; Kansas City, Missouri
Dec ?, 1947*		Fort Hays State	W 60–32	8–0	Nichols Hall; Manhattan, Kansas
Dec 30, 1947*		at Canisius	W 47–45	9–0	Buffalo Memorial Auditorium; Buffalo, New York
Jan 3, 1948*		at Saint Joseph's	W 59–44	10–0	Alumni Memorial Fieldhouse; Philadelphia, Pennsylvania
Jan 6, 1948*		at Long Island University	L 47–65	10–1	Madison Square Garden; New York, New York
Big Seven Regular Season
Jan 12, 1948		Colorado	W 65–51	11–1 (1–0)	Nichols Hall; Manhattan, Kansas
Jan 19, 1948		Iowa State	W 61–42	12–1 (2–0)	Nichols Hall; Manhattan, Kansas
Jan 24, 1948*		Drake	W 56–45	13–1	Nichols Hall; Manhattan, Kansas
Jan 31, 1948		at Nebraska	W 64–45	14–1 (3–0)	Nebraska Coliseum; Lincoln, Nebraska
Feb 2, 1948		at Colorado	W 50–44	15–1 (4–0)	Balch Fieldhouse; Boulder, Colorado
Feb 7, 1948		at Missouri	L 46–48	15–2 (4–1)	Brewer Fieldhouse; Columbia, Missouri
Feb 14, 1948		Oklahoma	L 47–49	15–3 (4–2)	Nichols Hall; Manhattan, Kansas
Feb 18, 1948		Kansas	W 48–29	16–3 (5–2)	Nichols Hall; Manhattan, Kansas
Feb 21, 1948		Missouri	W 55–53	17–3 (6–2)	Nichols Hall; Manhattan, Kansas
Feb 24, 1948		at Iowa State	W 54–48	18–3 (7–2)	Iowa State Armory; Ames, Iowa
Feb 27, 1948		Nebraska	W 56–49	19–3 (8–2)	Nichols Hall; Manhattan, Kansas
Mar 1, 1948		at Kansas	W 61–60	20–3 (9–2)	Hoch Auditorium; Lawrence, Kansas
Mar 8, 1948		at Oklahoma	L 52–56	20–4 (9–3)	McCasland Field House; Norman, Oklahoma
Mar 15, 1948*		vs. Oklahoma A&M; Big Seven Playoff	W 43–34	21–4	Municipal Auditorium; Kansas City, Missouri
NCAA Tournament
Mar 19, 1948*		vs. Wyoming regional semifinal – Elite Eight	W 58–48	22–4	Municipal Auditorium; Kansas City, Missouri
Mar 20, 1948*		vs. Baylor; Regional Final/National semifinal – Final Four	L 52–60	22–5	Municipal Auditorium; Kansas City, Missouri
Mar 23, 1948*		vs. Holy Cross; National third-place game	L 54–60	22–6	Madison Square Garden; New York, New York
*Non-conference game. ^{#}Rankings from AP Poll. (#) Tournament seedings in parentheses. W=West.

== Awards and honors ==
- Howie Shannon – All-American
