= 1948 SEC men's basketball tournament =

- Classification: Division I
- Teams: 12
- Site: Jefferson County Armory; Louisville, Kentucky
- Champions: Kentucky (10th title)
- Winning coach: Adolph Rupp (10th title)

1947–48 Southeastern Conference men's basketball standings
	Conf.				Overall
Team	W		L	PCT	W		L	PCT
Kentucky †	9	–	0	1.000	36	–	3	.923
Tulane	13	–	1	.929	23	–	3	.885
Tennessee	10	–	2	.833	20	–	5	.800
Alabama	8	–	8	.500	15	–	12	.556
Auburn	7	–	7	.500	12	–	10	.545
Georgia	6	–	8	.429	18	–	10	.643
Florida	5	–	7	.417	15	–	10	.600
Georgia Tech	6	–	10	.375	12	–	16	.429
Mississippi State	6	–	10	.375	6	–	12	.333
Ole Miss	5	–	9	.357	11	–	12	.478
LSU	4	–	10	.286	8	–	18	.308
Vanderbilt	4	–	11	.267	8	–	14	.364
† Regular-season championship and SEC Tournament winner

The 1948 Southeastern Conference men's basketball tournament took place on March 4–6, 1949, in Louisville, Kentucky at the Jefferson County Armory. It was the fifteenth SEC basketball tournament.

Kentucky won the tournament by beating Georgia Tech in the championship game. The Wildcats would go on to win the 1948 NCAA tournament.

== Bracket ==
First Round
Georgia Tech	46
Alabama	34
Tulane	47
Auburn	40
Tennessee	73
Mississippi State	52
Kentucky	87
Florida	31

Quarterfinals
Georgia	57
Georgia Tech	60
Vanderbilt	53
Tulane	67
Ole Miss	62
Tennessee	81
LSU	47
Kentucky	63

Semifinals
Georgia Tech	50
Tulane	40
Tennessee	47
Kentucky	70

Finals
Georgia Tech	43
Kentucky	54
