= 1947–48 Michigan Wolverines men's basketball team =

American college basketball season

1947–48 Michigan Wolverines men's basketball

Big Ten regular season champions

NCAA tournament, Elite Eight
- Conference: Big Ten Conference
- Record: 16–6 (10–2 Big Ten)
- Head coach: Osborne Cowles
- Assistant coaches: Ernest McCoy; Joe Vancisin
- MVP: Pete Elliott
- Captain: Bob Harrison
- Home arena: Yost Arena

1947–48 Big Nine Conference men's basketball standings
	Conf.				Overall
Team	W		L	PCT	W		L	PCT
Michigan	10	–	2	.833	16	–	6	.727
Iowa	8	–	4	.667	15	–	4	.789
Illinois	7	–	5	.583	15	–	5	.750
Wisconsin	7	–	5	.583	12	–	8	.600
Purdue	6	–	6	.500	11	–	9	.550
Minnesota	5	–	7	.417	10	–	10	.500
Ohio State	5	–	7	.417	10	–	10	.500
Indiana	3	–	9	.250	8	–	12	.400
Northwestern	3	–	9	.250	6	–	14	.300

The 1947–48 Michigan Wolverines men's basketball team represented the University of Michigan in intercollegiate college basketball during the 1947–48 season. The team played its home games at Yost Arena on the school's campus in Ann Arbor, Michigan. The team won the Western Conference Championship. Under the direction of head coach Osborne Cowles, the team earned Michigan's first invitation to the NCAA Division I men's basketball tournament in 1948. The team was led the school's first two All-Big Nine honorees: Bob Harrison and Pete Elliott as well as the team's leading scorer Mack Suprunowicz. The team earned the Big Nine team statistical championships for both scoring defense (46.3) and scoring margin (7.6). Harrison served as team captain and Elliott earned team MVP.

== Schedule ==
1947-48 Overall: 16-6 Big Ten: 10-2 (1st | Champions) Postseason: NCAA (East), (Regional Third Place) Head Coach: Osborne Cowles Staff: Ernest McCoy, Joe Vancisin & Ray Fisher (Freshmen) Captain: Bob Harrison Home Arena: Yost Field House (7,500)

Date Rk Opponent H/A W/L Score +/-
12/13/1947 - Western Michigan H W 63-50 +13
12/18/1947 - at Michigan State A L 38-43 -5
12/20/1947 - at Marquette A W 78-70 +8
12/22/1947 - USC H W 51-38 +13
12/29/1947 - at Iowa State A L 51-53 -2
12/30/1947 - at Iowa State A L 41-47 -6
1/3/1948 - at Toledo A W 58-52 +6
1/10/1948 - Minnesota+ H W 43-41 +2
1/12/1948 - at Northwestern+ A L 48-51 -3
1/17/1948 - at Wisconsin+ A W 43-38 +5
1/31/1948 - Northwestern+ H W 53-37 +16
2/2/1948 - at Ohio State+ A L 66-70 -4
2/7/1948 - at Illinois+ A W 66-57 +9
2/14/1948 - Purdue+ H W 69-56 +13
2/16/1948 - Indiana+ H W 66-54 +12
2/21/1948 - at Minnesota+ A W 56-45 +11
2/23/1948 - at Purdue+ A W 46-35 +11
2/28/1948 - Ohio State+ H W 40-36 +4
3/1/1948 - Iowa+ H W 51-35 +16
3/6/1948 - Michigan State H W 69-28 +41
3/18/1948 - vs. Holy Cross N1 L 45-63 -18
3/20/1948 - vs. Columbia N2 W 66-49 +17

(1) NC Eastern Regional, New York, N.Y. (Madison Square Garden) (2) NC Eastern Third Place game, New York, N.Y. (Madison Square Garden)
