= 1947–48 Washington Huskies men's basketball team =

American college basketball season

1947–48 Washington Huskies men's basketball

Pacific Coast Conference Champions

NCAA tournament, Regional third place
- Conference: Pacific Coast Conference
- Record: 23–11 (10–6 PCC)
- Head coach: Art McLarney (1st season)
- Home arena: Hec Edmundson Pavilion

1947–48 Pacific Coast Conference men's basketball standings
	Conf.				Overall
Team	W		L	PCT	W		L	PCT
North
Washington †	10	–	6	.625	23	–	11	.676
Oregon State	10	–	6	.625	21	–	13	.618
Washington State	9	–	7	.563	19	–	10	.655
Oregon	8	–	8	.500	18	–	11	.621
Idaho	3	–	13	.188	17	–	15	.531
South
California	11	–	1	.917	25	–	9	.735
USC	7	–	5	.583	14	–	10	.583
UCLA	3	–	9	.250	12	–	13	.480
Stanford	3	–	9	.250	15	–	11	.577
† Conference playoff series winner

The 1947–48 Washington Huskies men's basketball team represented the University of Washington for the 1947–48 NCAA college basketball season. Led by first-year head coach Art McLarney, the Huskies were members of the Pacific Coast Conference and played their home games on campus at Hec Edmundson Pavilion in Seattle, Washington.

The Huskies were 19–9 overall in the regular season and 10–6 in conference play; tied with Oregon State for the Northern Division title, which required a one-game playoff. Held at neutral McArthur Court in Eugene, Oregon, the Huskies defeated the injury-hampered Beavers by seventeen points.

Washington advanced to the three-game conference championship series at Berkeley against host California, the Southern Division champion. The Golden Bears won the opener, but the Huskies rallied and took the next two for the conference title. It was the first time in fourteen years that a Northern team won the playoff series on a Southern home court.

The eight-team NCAA tournament had two regionals with four teams each. Washington fell to Baylor by two points in the opener of the West regional in Kansas City. In the regional third place game, the Huskies defeated Wyoming by ten points.

Longtime head coach Hec Edmundson stepped down before this season, but continued as track coach; the twenty-year-old UW Pavilion was renamed for him in January 1948.

== Postseason results ==
Date time, TV	Opponent	Result	Record	Site (attendance) city, state
Pacific Coast Conference Northern Division Playoff
Tue, March 9; 8:00 pm	vs. Oregon State	W 59–42	20–9	McArthur Court (7,000); Eugene, Oregon
Pacific Coast Conference Playoff Series
Fri, March 12; 8:30 pm	at California; Game One	L 51–64	20–10	UC Men's Gym; Berkeley, California
Sat, March 13; 8:30 pm	at California; Game Two	W 64–57	21–10	UC Men's Gym; Berkeley, California
Mon, March 15; 8:30 pm	at California; Game Three	W 59–49	22–10	UC Men's Gym; Berkeley, California
NCAA Tournament
Fri, March 19*; 7:30 pm	vs. Baylor; Regional semifinal	L 62–64	22–11	Municipal Auditorium (9,700); Kansas City, Missouri
Sat, March 20*; 5:45 pm	vs. Wyoming; Regional third place	W 57–47	23–11	Municipal Auditorium (9,700); Kansas City, Missouri
*Non-conference game. (#) Tournament seedings in parentheses. All times are in Pacific time.
