= 1947–48 Wisconsin Badgers men's basketball team =

American college basketball season

1947–48 Wisconsin Badgers men's basketball
- Conference: Big Ten Conference
- Record: 12–8 (7–5 Big Ten)
- Head coach: Harold E. Foster
- Home arena: UW Fieldhouse

1947–48 Big Nine Conference men's basketball standings
	Conf.				Overall
Team	W		L	PCT	W		L	PCT
Michigan	10	–	2	.833	16	–	6	.727
Iowa	8	–	4	.667	15	–	4	.789
Illinois	7	–	5	.583	15	–	5	.750
Wisconsin	7	–	5	.583	12	–	8	.600
Purdue	6	–	6	.500	11	–	9	.550
Minnesota	5	–	7	.417	10	–	10	.500
Ohio State	5	–	7	.417	10	–	10	.500
Indiana	3	–	9	.250	8	–	12	.400
Northwestern	3	–	9	.250	6	–	14	.300

The 1947–48 Wisconsin Badgers men's basketball team represented University of Wisconsin–Madison. The head coach was Harold E. Foster, coaching his fourteenth season with the Badgers. The team played their home games at the UW Fieldhouse in Madison, Wisconsin and was a member of the Big Nine Conference.

== Schedule ==
Date time, TV	Rank^{#}	Opponent^{#}	Result	Record	Site city, state
Regular Season
12/06/1947*		Marquette	W 57–50	1–0	UW Fieldhouse; Madison, Wisconsin
12/08/1947*		Butler	W 61–53	2–0	UW Fieldhouse; Madison, Wisconsin
12/12/1947*		Pittsburgh	W 49–36	3–0	UW Fieldhouse; Madison, Wisconsin
12/19/1947*		at California	L 61–73	3–1	Men's Gym; Berkeley, California
12/20/1947*		at California	L 44–59	3–2	Men's Gym; Berkeley, California
12/22/1947*		at Oklahoma	L 49–75	3–3	McCasland Field House; Norman, Oklahoma
12/31/1947*		at Marquette	W 67–60	4–3	Marquette Gymnasium; Milwaukee
1/03/1948		Illinois	W 52–47	5–3 (1–0)	UW Fieldhouse; Madison, Wisconsin
1/05/1948		Minnesota	W 59–50	6–3 (2–0)	UW Fieldhouse; Madison, Wisconsin
1/10/1948		at Indiana	W 58–54	7–3 (3–0)	IU Fieldhouse; Bloomington, Indiana
1/12/1948		Iowa	W 60–51	8–3 (4–0)	UW Fieldhouse; Madison, Wisconsin
1/17/1948		Michigan	L 39–43	8–4 (4–1)	UW Fieldhouse; Madison, Wisconsin
1/19/1948		Purdue	W 49–44	9–4 (5–1)	UW Fieldhouse; Madison, Wisconsin
1/24/1948		at Illinois	L 36–57	9–5 (5–2)	Huff Hall; Champaign, Illinois
2/07/1948		vs. Northwestern	W 68–62	10–5 (6–2)	Chicago Stadium; Chicago
2/09/1948*		Michigan State	W 51–39	11–5	UW Fieldhouse; Madison, Wisconsin
2/16/1948		at Ohio State	L 47–53	11–6 (6–3)	Ohio Expo Center Coliseum; Columbus, Ohio
2/21/1948		at Iowa	L 40–62	11–7 (6–4)	Iowa Field House; Iowa City, IA
2/23/1948		Northwestern	W 59–54	12–7 (7–4)	UW Fieldhouse; Madison, Wisconsin
3/01/1948		at Minnesota	L 41–46	12–8 (7–5)	Minnesota Field House; Minneapolis
*Non-conference game. ^{#}Rankings from AP Poll. (#) Tournament seedings in parentheses.
