= 1947–48 Idaho Vandals men's basketball team =

American college basketball season

1947–48 Idaho Vandals men's basketball
- Conference: Pacific Coast Conference
- Record: 17–15 (3–13 PCC)
- Head coach: Charles Finley (1st season)
- MVP: Preston Brimhall
- Home arena: Memorial Gymnasium

1947–48 Pacific Coast Conference men's basketball standings
	Conf.				Overall
Team	W		L	PCT	W		L	PCT
North
Washington †	10	–	6	.625	23	–	11	.676
Oregon State	10	–	6	.625	21	–	13	.618
Washington State	9	–	7	.563	19	–	10	.655
Oregon	8	–	8	.500	18	–	11	.621
Idaho	3	–	13	.188	17	–	15	.531
South
California	11	–	1	.917	25	–	9	.735
USC	7	–	5	.583	14	–	10	.583
UCLA	3	–	9	.250	12	–	13	.480
Stanford	3	–	9	.250	15	–	11	.577
† Conference playoff series winner

The 1947–48 Idaho Vandals men's basketball team represented the University of Idaho during the 1947–48 NCAA college basketball season. Members of the Pacific Coast Conference, the Vandals were led by first-year head coach Charles Finley and played their home games on campus at Memorial Gymnasium in Moscow, Idaho.

The Vandals were 17–15 overall and 3–13 in conference play.

Finley was hired in the summer of 1947; he was the athletic director and coached two sports at the New Mexico School of Mines in Socorro and was also a baseball scout for the Boston Braves organization.
