= Illinois–Indiana rivalry =

American college multi-sports rivalry

- Illinois Fighting Illini Indiana Hoosiers
- Sport: Basketball; Football

The Illinois–Indiana rivalry is a college sports rivalry between the University of Illinois Fighting Illini and the Indiana University Hoosiers. The rivalry between these bordering-state schools dates back to 1899 when the Indiana Hoosiers joined the Big Ten Conference of which Illinois is a founding member. The rivalry is most prominent in men's basketball, where both teams are perennial contenders of the Big Ten Championship. In football, the rivalry is less intense, but notable for the two school's geographic proximity, the history and longevity of the series with 74 total meetings dating back to 1899 and their status as a previously "protected rivalry" in the Big Ten.

This multi-sports rivalry is further hallmarked by the two schools' similarities. Both schools are flagship universities in bordering states in the Midwest, both schools start with the letter "I", both schools are longtime members of the Big Ten Conference, both school's mascots are named after their respective state's demonym and both schools play their home football games in a stadium named "Memorial Stadium." Additionally, in basketball, the Indiana Hoosiers play their home games in Assembly Hall while the Illinois Fighting Illini play their home games in State Farm Center, which was formerly named Assembly Hall.

Locations of Illinois and Indiana

== Men's basketball ==
Illinois and Indiana first met on January 20, 1906, with an Illinois victory, 27–24. The location of the game alternates between Simon Skjodt Assembly Hall in Bloomington and the State Farm Center, formerly Assembly Hall, in Champaign. There have been a total of five overtime games in this series.

In mid-1980s Indiana head coach Bob Knight brought allegations to the NCAA that Illinois assistant coaches had acted improperly in the recruitment of Lowell Hamilton. Hamilton was the focus of a recruiting competition between Illinois and Indiana, and while the allegations of improper conduct were unfounded by the NCAA, the controversy had some level of impact on the games at the time.

Illinois–Indiana men's basketball rivalry
- Illinois Fighting Illini Indiana Hoosiers
- Sport: College basketball
- First meeting: January 20, 1906; Illinois 27 – Indiana 24
- Latest meeting: February 15, 2026; Illinois 71 – Indiana 51
- Stadiums: State Farm Center, Simon Skjodt Assembly Hall

Statistics
- Total meetings: 190
- All-time series: Indiana leads, 96–94
- Largest victory: Indiana, 107–67 (1974)
- Longest win streak: Indiana, 9 (1972–1977)
- Current win streak: Illinois, 3 (2024–present)

On March 10, 1991, after an Indiana victory in Champaign, a profanity-laced shouting match between Knight and Fighting Illini coach Lou Henson erupted outside the team locker rooms. The incident started when Knight left the Assembly Hall court with seven seconds remaining in the game, skipping the traditional postgame handshake while laughing and waving to the Illinois crowd. This incident enraged Henson to the point of confronting Knight outside of the locker room. Henson's anger continued as he spoke out against Knight at the postgame press conference.

"What do you expect out of Knight? He`s a classic bully. I was in the (Indiana) locker room, he jumped on me and I wanted him to come outside. He intimidates the Big 10 office; he tries to intimidate everybody. His entire life is based on intimidation, but the big bully won`t intimidate me."

— Lou Henson

In a game at Bloomington on February 25, 1998, Indiana head coach Bob Knight was issued two technical fouls by referee Ted Valentine for first arguing a call after a hard collision between Illinois guard Sergio McClain and Indiana guard Luke Recker in which McClain was issued a technical foul for touching the rim after blocking Recker's shot. Coach Knight argued the call should have been goaltending. From the collision, Recker fell hard to the court in pain. To check on his player, Coach Knight rushed to the court for which he was issued the second technical foul by Valentine.

Occasional feuds and incidents between the schools' programs have fueled the competition over the years. Illinois has dominated Indiana in the short history of the Big Ten tournament. Since the onset of the conference tournament, Illinois and Indiana have played a total of 9 times. Illinois holds the record of 6–3 over Indiana. In the 1999 Big Ten tournament the Hoosiers and the Illini faced each other and Illinois won the game 82–66. Illinois would go on to win 4 of the next 5 tournament meetings.

Another feud is less focused on the tension between the two schools, but rather a former Illinois head coach and his ties to Indiana. Bruce Weber coached the Fighting Illini from 2003 to 2012, but the history between Weber and Indiana began before he set foot in Champaign. As head coach at Southern Illinois University for five years from 1998 to 2003, he scheduled some non-conference meetings against Indiana. Before that, Weber served as an assistant coach under Gene Keady at Purdue University for 18 years. During his tenure at Illinois, Weber noted that there was tension between himself and Indiana (see Indiana–Purdue rivalry).

In 2007 there was a recruiting battle between the schools over Indiana Mr. Basketball, Eric Gordon. Gordon initially verbally committed to play for Illinois. However, when Mike Davis resigned as Indiana's head coach and Kelvin Sampson was hired, Gordon decommitted and signed his National Letter of Intent to play for Indiana.

Team	Illinois	Indiana
National titles	0	5
Final Four appearances	5	8
NCAA Tournament appearances	32	41
NCAA Tournament record	42-34	68-36
Big Ten tournament titles	3	0
Big Ten regular season titles	18	22
Consensus First Team All-Americans	16	16
Naismith Players of the Year	0	2
Big Ten Players of the Year	3	6
Big Ten Medal of Honor Recipients	19	16
All-time program record	1876-1054	1909-1106
All-time winning percentage	.640	.633

- Through March 19, 2023

=== Game results ===
Illinois victories	Indiana victories	Tie games

No.	Date	Location	Winner	Score
1	January 20, 1906	Kenney Gym	Illinois	27–24
2	February 16, 1906	Old Assembly Hall	Indiana	37–8
3	January 25, 1908	Kenney Gym	Illinois	39–12
4	January 9, 1909	Kenney Gym	Illinois	30–2
5	March 6, 1909	Old Assembly Hall	Indiana	23–13
6	February 5, 1910	Kenney Gym	Illinois	30–20
7	March 5, 1910	Old Assembly Hall	Illinois	26–12
8	January 8, 1911	Kenney Gym	Illinois	33–22
9	February 12, 1911	Old Assembly Hall	Indiana	19–14
10	February 7, 1912	Old Assembly Hall	Indiana	24–23
11	February 23, 1912	Kenney Gym	Illinois	41–18
12	March 1, 1913	Kenney Gym	Illinois	29–12
13	March 8, 1913	Old Assembly Hall	Illinois	23–17
14	January 6, 1914	Kenney Gym	Illinois	35–6
15	February 7, 1914	Old Assembly Hall	Illinois	31–15
16	January 11, 1915	Kenney Gym	Illinois	34–14
17	January 26, 1915	Old Assembly Hall	Illinois	20–4
18	January 23, 1923	Kenney Gym	Illinois	31–22
19	February 12, 1923	Men's Gymnasium	Indiana	31–24
20	January 17, 1925	Kenney Gym	Illinois	31–22
21	February 23, 1925	Men's Gymnasium	Indiana	30–24
22	February 19, 1926	Men's Gymnasium	Illinois	21–20
23	March 6, 1926	Huff Gym	Indiana	28–25
24	January 21, 1928	Men's Gymnasium	Indiana	44–29
25	March 6, 1928	Huff Gym	Indiana	27–23
26	January 8, 1929	Huff Gym	Illinois	20–16
27	February 26, 1929	Men's Gymnasium	Indiana	32–22
28	January 17, 1931	Huff Gym	Indiana	35–34
29	February 23, 1931	The Field House	Illinois	39–25
30	January 11, 1932	The Field House	Illinois	30–22
31	March 7, 1932	Huff Gym	Illinois	33–32
32	February 10, 1934	Huff Gym	Illinois	28–25
33	February 24, 1934	The Field House	Indiana	36–24
34	January 5, 1935	Huff Gym	Indiana	32–28
35	January 14, 1935	The Field House	Indiana	42–29
36	January 11, 1937	Huff Gym	Illinois	40–31
37	February 20, 1937	The Field House	Illinois	42–25
38	January 4, 1938	The Field House	Indiana	51–46
39	March 4, 1938	Huff Gym	Indiana	45–35
40	January 9, 1939	Huff Gym	Indiana	38–32
41	January 6, 1940	The Field House	Indiana	38–36
42	January 11, 1941	Huff Gym	Indiana	48–38
43	February 9, 1942	The Field House	Indiana	41–36
44	February 12, 1945	Huff Gym	Illinois	71–48
45	February 28, 1945	The Field House	Indiana	65–55
46	February 15, 1947	Huff Gym	Illinois	59–50
47	March 1, 1947	The Field House	Indiana	48–41
48	January 19, 1948	Huff Gym	Illinois	46–45
49	March 1, 1948	The Field House	Illinois	52–51
50	January 8, 1949	The Field House	Illinois	44–42
51	February 28, 1949	Huff Gym	No. 4 Illinois	76–60
52	February 13, 1950	Huff Gym	No. 16 Indiana	83–72
53	February 27, 1950	The Field House	No. 17 Indiana	80–66
54	January 15, 1951	The Field House	No. 6 Indiana	64–53
55	February 19, 1951	Huff Gym	No. 11 Illinois	71–65
56	February 14, 1952	Huff Gym	No. 2 Illinois	78–66
57	February 18, 1952	The Field House	No. 6 Illinois	77–70
58	January 17, 1953	The Field House	No. 6 Indiana	74–70^{OT}
59	February 28, 1953	Huff Gym	No. 2 Indiana	91–79
60	March 6, 1954	The Field House	No. 2 Indiana	67–64
61	January 8, 1955	Huff Gym	No. 12 Illinois	99–75
62	January 14, 1956	The Field House	No. 8 Illinois	96–72
63	February 6, 1956	Huff Gym	No. 6 Illinois	92–89
64	January 14, 1957	Huff Gym	No. 10 Illinois	112–91
65	March 4, 1957	The Field House	No. 10 Indiana	84–76
66	January 11, 1958	The Field House	Indiana	89–82
67	March 3, 1958	Huff Gym	Indiana	96–86
68	February 9, 1959	The Field House	Illinois	89–83
69	February 21, 1959	Huff Gym	Illinois	100–98
70	February 22, 1960	Huff Gym	Indiana	92–78
71	February 25, 1961	New Field House	Indiana	93–82
72	February 3, 1962	Huff Gym	No. 4 Illinois	96–85
73	March 5, 1962	New Field House	Indiana	104–92
74	February 4, 1963	Huff Gym	No. 4 Illinois	104–101
75	February 16, 1963	New Field House	Indiana	103–100
76	February 3, 1964	New Field House	Indiana	104–96
77	January 4, 1965	Assembly Hall^{Champaign}	No. 6 Illinois	86–81
78	January 8, 1966	New Field House	Illinois	98–84
79	February 12, 1966	Assembly Hall^{Champaign}	Indiana	81–77
80	February 20, 1967	New Field House	Indiana	96–81
81	March 4, 1967	Assembly Hall^{Champaign}	Illinois	80–70
82	January 9, 1968	Assembly Hall^{Champaign}	Indiana	61–60^{OT}
83	March 1, 1969	New Field House	No. 15 Illinois	77–64
84	January 6, 1970	Assembly Hall^{Champaign}	Illinois	94–74
85	March 3, 1970	New Field House	Illinois	85–75
86	February 20, 1971	Assembly Hall^{Champaign}	Indiana	88–86
87	March 13, 1971	Assembly Hall^{Bloomington}	Illinois	103–87
88	February 22, 1972	Assembly Hall^{Champaign}	Indiana	90–71
89	February 12, 1973	Assembly Hall^{Bloomington}	No. 4 Indiana	87–66
90	February 9, 1974	Assembly Hall^{Bloomington}	No. 12 Indiana	107–67
91	February 18, 1974	Assembly Hall^{Champaign}	No. 12 Indiana	101–83
92	January 27, 1975	Assembly Hall^{Bloomington}	No. 1 Indiana	73–57
93	February 24, 1975	Assembly Hall^{Champaign}	No. 1 Indiana	112–89
94	January 17, 1976	Assembly Hall^{Champaign}	No. 1 Indiana	83–55
95	February 24, 1976	Assembly Hall^{Bloomington}	No. 1 Indiana	58–48
96	January 8, 1977	Assembly Hall^{Bloomington}	Indiana	80–60

No.	Date	Location	Winner	Score
97	February 17, 1977	Assembly Hall^{Champaign}	Illinois	73–69
98	January 7, 1978	Assembly Hall^{Bloomington}	Illinois	65–64
99	March 2, 1978	Assembly Hall^{Champaign}	Indiana	77–68
100	January 4, 1979	Assembly Hall^{Bloomington}	No. 4 Illinois	65–61
101	March 3, 1979	Assembly Hall^{Champaign}	Indiana	72–60
102	January 31, 1980	Assembly Hall^{Bloomington}	No. 18 Indiana	60–54
103	February 9, 1980	Assembly Hall^{Champaign}	Illinois	69–68
104	January 10, 1981	Assembly Hall^{Bloomington}	Indiana	78–61
105	March 5, 1981	Assembly Hall^{Champaign}	No. 14 Indiana	69–66
106	January 21, 1982	Assembly Hall^{Champaign}	Indiana	54–53
107	February 11, 1982	Assembly Hall^{Bloomington}	Indiana	73–60
108	January 13, 1983	Assembly Hall^{Champaign}	No. 4 Indiana	69–55
109	March 5, 1983	Assembly Hall^{Bloomington}	No. 11 Indiana	67–55
110	January 11, 1984	Assembly Hall^{Bloomington}	Indiana	73–68
111	March 4, 1984	Assembly Hall^{Champaign}	No. 10 Illinois	70–53
112	January 27, 1985	Assembly Hall^{Champaign}	No. 6 Illinois	52–41
113	February 21, 1985	Assembly Hall^{Bloomington}	No. 16 Illinois	66–50
114	January 25, 1986	Assembly Hall^{Bloomington}	Indiana	71–69
115	February 20, 1986	Assembly Hall^{Champaign}	No. 15 Indiana	61–60
116	January 28, 1987	Assembly Hall^{Bloomington}	No. 4 Indiana	69–66
117	March 1, 1987	Assembly Hall^{Champaign}	No. 14 Illinois	69–67
118	February 6, 1988	Assembly Hall^{Champaign}	Indiana	75–74
119	February 29, 1988	Assembly Hall^{Bloomington}	Illinois	75–65
120	January 28, 1989	Assembly Hall^{Champaign}	No. 1 Illinois	75–65
121	March 5, 1989	Assembly Hall^{Bloomington}	No. 8 Illinois	70–67
122	February 4, 1990	Assembly Hall^{Champaign}	No. 11 Illinois	70–65
123	March 10, 1990	Assembly Hall^{Bloomington}	No. 20 Illinois	69–63
124	January 2, 1991	Assembly Hall^{Bloomington}	No. 5 Indiana	109–74
125	March 10, 1991	Assembly Hall^{Champaign}	No. 3 Indiana	70–58
126	February 4, 1992	Assembly Hall^{Champaign}	No. 6 Indiana	76–65
127	March 1, 1992	Assembly Hall^{Bloomington}	No. 2 Indiana	76–70
128	January 16, 1993	Assembly Hall^{Champaign}	No. 6 Indiana	83–79
129	February 17, 1993	Assembly Hall^{Bloomington}	No. 1 Indiana	93–71
130	January 30, 1994	Assembly Hall^{Champaign}	Illinois	88–81
131	March 1, 1994	Assembly Hall^{Bloomington}	No. 17 Indiana	82–77
132	January 14, 1995	Assembly Hall^{Champaign}	Illinois	78–67
133	March 2, 1995	Assembly Hall^{Bloomington}	Indiana	89–85
134	January 13, 1996	Assembly Hall^{Champaign}	Indiana	85–71
135	February 28, 1996	Assembly Hall^{Bloomington}	Indiana	76–64
136	February 2, 1997	Assembly Hall^{Bloomington}	Illinois	78–74
137	January 3, 1998	Assembly Hall^{Champaign}	Illinois	74–72
138	February 24, 1998	Assembly Hall^{Bloomington}	Illinois	82–72
139	January 3, 1999	Assembly Hall^{Bloomington}	No. 8 Indiana	62–53
140	February 24, 1999	Assembly Hall^{Champaign}	No. 20 Indiana	70–64
141	March 5, 1999*	United Center	Illinois	82–66
142	February 22, 2000	Assembly Hall^{Champaign}	Illinois	87–63
143	March 10, 2000*	United Center	No. 21 Illinois	72–69
144	February 17, 2001	Assembly Hall^{Bloomington}	No. 16 Illinois	67–61
145	March 10, 2001*	United Center	Indiana	58–56
146	January 26, 2002	Assembly Hall^{Bloomington}	Indiana	88–57
147	February 26, 2002	Assembly Hall^{Champaign}	No. 15 Illinois	70–62
148	January 18, 2003	Assembly Hall^{Bloomington}	No. 18 Indiana	74–66
149	February 25, 2003	Assembly Hall^{Champaign}	No. 18 Illinois	80–54
150	March 15, 2003*	United Center	No. 13 Illinois	73–72
151	February 3, 2004	Assembly Hall^{Bloomington}	Illinois	51–49
152	March 12, 2004*	Conseco Fieldhouse	No. 12 Illinois	71–59
153	February 6, 2005	Assembly Hall^{Champaign}	No. 1 Illinois	60–47
154	January 17, 2006	Assembly Hall^{Bloomington}	No. 13 Indiana	62–60
155	February 19, 2006	Assembly Hall^{Champaign}	No. 14 Illinois	70–58
156	January 23, 2007	Assembly Hall^{Champaign}	Illinois	51–43
157	February 10, 2007	Assembly Hall^{Bloomington}	No. 24 Indiana	65–61
158	March 9, 2007*	United Center	Illinois	58–54^{OT}
159	January 13, 2008	Assembly Hall^{Bloomington}	No. 11 Indiana	62–58
160	February 7, 2008	Assembly Hall^{Champaign}	No. 13 Indiana	83–79^{OT}
161	January 10, 2009	Assembly Hall^{Champaign}	Illinois	76–45
162	February 15, 2009	Assembly Hall^{Bloomington}	No. 20 Illinois	65–52
163	January 9, 2010	Assembly Hall^{Bloomington}	Illinois	66–60
164	January 30, 2010	Assembly Hall^{Champaign}	Illinois	71–70
165	January 27, 2011	Assembly Hall^{Bloomington}	Indiana	52–49
166	March 5, 2011	Assembly Hall^{Champaign}	Illinois	72–48
167	February 9, 2012	Assembly Hall^{Bloomington}	No. 23 Indiana	84–71
168	February 7, 2013	Assembly Hall^{Champaign}	Illinois	74–72
169	March 15, 2013*	United Center	No. 3 Indiana	80–64
170	December 31, 2013	State Farm Center	Illinois	83–80^{OT}
171	January 26, 2014	Assembly Hall^{Bloomington}	Indiana	56–46
172	March 13, 2014*	Conseco Fieldhouse	Illinois	64–54
173	January 18, 2015	State Farm Center	Indiana	80–74
174	January 19, 2016	Simon Skjodt Assembly Hall	No. 25 Indiana	103–69
175	February 25, 2016	State Farm Center	No. 18 Indiana	74–47
176	January 7, 2017	Simon Skjodt Assembly Hall	No. 25 Indiana	96–80
177	January 24, 2018	State Farm Center	Illinois	73–71
178	February 14, 2018	Simon Skjodt Assembly Hall	Indiana	78–68
179	January 3, 2019	Simon Skjodt Assembly Hall	No. 21 Indiana	73–65
180	March 7, 2019	State Farm Center	Indiana	92–74
181	March 1, 2020	State Farm Center	Illinois	67–66
182	December 26, 2020	State Farm Center	No. 18 Illinois	69–60
183	February 2, 2021	Simon Skjodt Assembly Hall	No. 12 Illinois	75–71^{OT}
184	February 5, 2022	Simon Skjodt Assembly Hall	No. 18 Illinois	74–57
185	March 11, 2022*	Gainbridge Fieldhouse	Indiana	65–63
186	January 19, 2023	State Farm Center	Indiana	80–65
187	February 18, 2023	Simon Skjodt Assembly Hall	No. 14 Indiana	71–68
188	January 27, 2024	State Farm Center	No. 10 Illinois	70–62
189	January 14, 2025	Simon Skjodt Assembly Hall	No. 19 Illinois	94–69
190	February 15, 2026	State Farm Center	No. 8 Illinois	71–51
Series: Indiana leads 96–94

- *Denotes game played during the Big Ten tournament

By decade (through 2026)

Illinois advantage	Indiana advantage	Tie

Decade	Illinois	Indiana
1900	3	2
1910	10	2
1920	4	6
1930	6	7
1940	6	5
1950	9	9
1960	6	8
1970	6	12
1980	8	12
1990	8	12
2000	14	7
2010	7	11
2020	7	3
Total	94	96

== Football ==
Illinois–Indiana football rivalry
- Illinois Fighting Illini Indiana Hoosiers
- Sport: American football
- First meeting: October 14, 1899; Indiana 5, Illinois 0
- Latest meeting: September 20, 2025; Indiana 63, Illinois 10
- Next meeting: 2027
- Stadiums: Gies Memorial Stadium (Illinois); Memorial Stadium (Indiana)
- Trophy: None

Statistics
- Total meetings: 74
- All-time series: Illinois leads 46–26–2
- Largest victory: Indiana, 63–10 (2025)
- Longest win streak: Illinois, 6 (1981–86)
- Current win streak: Indiana, 1 (2025–present)

From 2014 to 2023, the Illinois Fighting Illini and the Indiana Hoosiers were in opposite divisions within the Big Ten Conference (Indiana was in the East Division and Illinois was in the West Division). For this reason, the two teams were not required to play each other every season, whereas if they had been in the same division, there would have been annual meetings. From 2011 to 2013, the two teams were "protected rivals" as members of the Big Ten's non-geographically organized "Leaders" division, which required them to play annually. The conference eliminated its divisional format for 2024 and beyond; only protected rivalries now compete annually, and Illinois–Indiana was not included as a protected rivalry, dropped in favor of Illinois–Purdue.

=== Game results ===
Illinois victories	Indiana victories	Tie games

No.	Date	Location	Winner	Score
1	October 14, 1899	Champaign, IL	Indiana	5–0
2	November 17, 1900	Indianapolis, IN	Tie	0–0
3	November 2, 1901	Indianapolis, IN	Illinois	18–0
4	November 1, 1902	Champaign, IL	Illinois	47–0
5	November 6, 1903	Bloomington, IN	Indiana	17–0
6	October 15, 1904	Champaign, IL	Illinois	10–0
7	November 22, 1907	Bloomington, IN	Illinois	10–6
8	October 31, 1908	Champaign, IL	Illinois	10–0
9	November 6, 1909	Champaign, IL	Illinois	6–5
10	November 5, 1910	Bloomington, IN	Illinois	3–0
11	November 11, 1911	Bloomington, IN	Tie	0–0
12	October 19, 1912	Champaign, IL	Illinois	13–7
13	October 25, 1913	Indianapolis, IN	Illinois	10–0
14	October 10, 1914	Champaign, IL	Illinois	51–0
15	October 20, 1928	Champaign, IL	Illinois	13–7
16	November 12, 1932	Champaign, IL	Illinois	18–6
17	October 16, 1937	Bloomington, IN	Indiana	13–6
18	October 8, 1938	Champaign, IL	Illinois	12–2
19	October 21, 1939	Champaign, IL	Indiana	7–6
20	September 23, 1944	Champaign, IL	Illinois	26–18
21	October 6, 1945	Champaign, IL	Indiana	6–0
22	October 12, 1946	Bloomington, IN	Indiana	14–7
23	November 5, 1949	Champaign, IL	Illinois	33–14
24	October 28, 1950	Champaign, IL	No. 12 Illinois	20–0
25	October 27, 1951	Bloomington, IN	No. 4 Illinois	21–0
26	September 26, 1959	Bloomington, IN	Indiana	20–0
27	September 24, 1960	Champaign, IL	No. 4 Illinois	17–6
28	October 16, 1965	Champaign, IL	Illinois	34–13
29	October 15, 1966	Bloomington, IN	Illinois	24–10
30	October 7, 1967	Champaign, IL	Indiana	20–7
31	October 5, 1968	Bloomington, IN	Indiana	28–14
32	October 18, 1969	Bloomington, IN	Indiana	41–20
33	October 17, 1970	Champaign, IL	Indiana	30–24
34	November 6, 1971	Bloomington, IL	Illinois	22–21
35	November 11, 1972	Champaign, IL	Illinois	37–20
36	September 15, 1973	Bloomington, IN	Illinois	28–14
37	September 14, 1974	Champaign, IL	Illinois	16–0
38	October 22, 1977	Champaign, IL	Illinois	21–7

No.	Date	Location	Winner	Score
39	October 28, 1978	Bloomington, IN	Indiana	37–10
40	November 10, 1979	Champaign, IL	Indiana	45–14
41	November 15, 1980	Bloomington, IN	Indiana	26–24
42	November 14, 1981	Champaign, IL	Illinois	35–14
43	November 13, 1982	Bloomington, IN	Illinois	48–7
44	November 12, 1983	Champaign, IL	No. 5 Illinois	49–21
45	November 10, 1984	Indianapolis, IN	Illinois	34–7
46	November 16, 1985	Champaign, IL	Illinois	41–24
47	November 15, 1986	Bloomington, IN	Illinois	21–16
48	November 7, 1987	Bloomington, IN	No. 18 Indiana	34–22
49	November 5, 1988	Champaign, IL	Illinois	21–20
50	November 18, 1989	Champaign, IL	No. 12 Illinois	41–28
51	November 17, 1990	Bloomington, IN	No. 22 Illinois	24–10
52	October 7, 1995	Bloomington, IN	Illinois	17–10
53	October 5, 1996	Champaign, IL	Illinois	46–43
54	November 1, 1997	Bloomington, IN	Indiana	23–6
55	November 7, 1998	Champaign, IL	Illinois	31–16
56	October 2, 1999	Bloomington, IN	Indiana	34–31
57	November 4, 2000	Champaign, IL	Illinois	42–35
58	October 13, 2001	Bloomington, IN	Illinois	35–14
59	October 26, 2002	Champaign, IL	Illinois	45–14
60	November 8, 2003	Bloomington, IN	Indiana	17–14
61	November 6, 2004	Champaign, IL	Illinois	26–22
62	October 8, 2005	Bloomington, IN	Indiana	36–13
63	October 7, 2006	Champaign, IL	Indiana	34–32
64	September 22, 2007	Bloomington, IN	Illinois	27–14
65	October 18, 2008	Champaign, IL	Illinois	55–13
66	October 17, 2009	Bloomington, IN	Indiana	27–14
67	October 23, 2010	Champaign, IL	Illinois	43–13
68	October 8, 2011	Bloomington, IN	No. 19 Illinois	41–20
69	October 27, 2012	Champaign, IL	Indiana	31–17
70	November 9, 2013	Bloomington, IN	Indiana	52–35
71	November 11, 2017	Champaign, IL	Indiana	24–14
72	September 2, 2022	Bloomington, IN	Indiana	23–20
73	November 11, 2023	Champaign, IL	Illinois	48–45^{OT}
74	September 20, 2025	Bloomington, IN	No. 19 Indiana	63–10
Series: Illinois leads 46–26–2

By decade (through 2025)

Illinois advantage	Indiana advantage	Tie

Decade	Illinois	Indiana	Tie
1890s		1	
1900s	6	1	1
1910s	4		1
1920s	1		
1930s	2	2	
1940s	2	2	
1950s	2	1	
1960s	3	3	
1970s	5	3	
1980s	8	2	
1990s	4	2	
2000s	6	4	
2010s	2	3	
2020s	1	2	
Total	46	26	2

== See also ==
- List of NCAA college football rivalry games
- List of Big Ten Conference football rivalry games
