= Illinois–Iowa rivalry =

American college multi-sports rivalry

- Illinois Fighting Illini Iowa Hawkeyes
- Sport: Basketball; Football

The Illinois–Iowa rivalry is a college multi-sport rivalry between the University of Illinois Fighting Illini and the University of Iowa Hawkeyes. While the bordering-state schools compete against each other in many different sports, the rivalry is most prominent in men's basketball and football. Both schools have been long-time members of the Big Ten Conference, with Illinois serving as a founding member of the conference in 1896 and Iowa joining in 1900.

Locations of Illinois and Iowa

== Men's basketball ==
Illinois–Iowa men's basketball rivalry
- Illinois Fighting Illini Iowa Hawkeyes
- Sport: College basketball
- First meeting: February 14, 1908; Iowa 46 – Illinois 36
- Latest meeting: March 28, 2026; Illinois 71 – Iowa 59
- Stadiums: State Farm Center, Carver–Hawkeye Arena

Statistics
- Total meetings: 173
- All-time series: Illinois leads, 96–77
- Largest victory: Illinois, 118–85 (1990)
- Longest win streak: Illinois, 7 (2008–2012)
- Current win streak: Illinois, 6 (2024–present)

The Illinois–Iowa men's basketball rivalry is an intra-Big Ten Conference, college basketball rivalry between the Illinois Fighting Illini and Iowa Hawkeyes. Multiple factors have played into the creation of the games between the two schools; Illinois and Iowa share a state border and are located about 242 miles (389 km) apart, and they share recruiting ground. The rivalry has been evidenced both on the court and off the court. Among the off the court elements of the rivalry, recruiting of basketball talent has resulted in battles for specific athletes. The most notable battle turned into the Pearl/Thomas Incident which began when both schools sought the services of Deon Thomas and resulted in recruiting restrictions and a one-year post-season ban for Illinois.

=== History ===
Illinois and Iowa first met on February 14, 1908, with an Iowa victory, 46–36. The teams would not meet again until 1913 in Urbana, Illinois, however, after 1924 the teams would play every year with the exception of six seasons. Since the two teams are both in the Big Ten Conference, they meet at least once per season. The location of the game alternates between State Farm Center, formerly Assembly Hall, in Champaign, and in Iowa City at Carver-Hawkeye Arena. There have been a total of six neutral site games in this series. Illinois leads the series 94–77.

==== Pearl/Thomas incident ====
In 1986 head coach Tom Davis took over an Iowa team from George Raveling that included two key forwards, Ed Horton and Kevin Gamble, each from Lanphier High School in Springfield, Illinois. Utilizing the success of those players, Bruce Pearl, assistant coach and key recruiter for Iowa, was working the state of Illinois to acquire Deon Thomas, a highly talented Chicago Public League player from Simeon High School. Simultaneously, Jimmy Collins, assistant coach to Lou Henson and the Fighting Illini, was also attempting to acquire Thomas. Pearl brought allegations to the NCAA that Illinois assistant coaches had acted improperly in the recruitment of Thomas, including secretly tape-recorded phone conversations with Thomas that were used in the investigation. While the allegations of improper conduct were unfounded by the NCAA, the investigation did uncover other violations that cost the University of Illinois with restrictions in football and basketball in the manner of limiting scholarships, recruiting and tournament participation.

==== Coleman/McCaffery Incident ====
In a game played in Iowa City on February 2, 2020, after an intensely physical game which saw 14 lead-changes and 8 ties, the Hawkeyes would come out on top with a final score of 72–65. During the closing seconds of the game, with Illinois' defense willing to let the final 12 seconds expire, sophomore guard Joe Wieskamp dunked to extend the Iowa lead to 10 points. This appeared to agitate the Illini players and, after a 3-point field goal by Illinois guard Ayo Dosunmu, with four seconds left, the Hawkeyes in-bounded the ball to CJ Fredrick and it appeared that Illinois was trying to intentionally foul. Fredrick kicked it out to Connor McCaffery, who was hugged by Dosunmu. Mike Eades, an official for the game, elected not to call the foul as the clock expired. The exchanges between both teams spilled over into the post-game handshake line when Illinois assistant coach Ron Coleman took exception to Joe Wieskamp's dunk with 12 seconds left to give the Hawkeyes a double-digit lead. Coleman shouted profanities in the direction of coach McCaffery, leading the coach to shout back at Coleman and instruct his Hawkeyes to head to the locker room, skipping the handshake line. The Illini staff eventually held their players near the scorer's table to let the Iowa players get to the tunnel to the locker room and off the court.

==== Ticket scandal ====
On February 1, 2023, a student spirit group known as "Orange Krush" from the University of Illinois, had 200 tickets to the game taking place on February 4, 2023, at Carver-Hawkeye Arena, rescinded with the $5,400 purchase price returned to the organization. The reason for the denial was due to the leader of the Orange Krush claiming they were being purchased for the Boys and Girls Club of Champaign, a non-profit organization who would get a discounted rate for the 200 tickets. The Iowa Athletic Department deemed this purchase to be under false pretenses, allowing them the right to deny the Orange Krush the opportunity to enter the game and barcodes for the tickets blocked, thus denying them the attempt to make the 20th annual road trip for the group. Because the order was made in September 2022, the Orange Krush had procured donations that could be utilized for charter bus transportation from Champaign to Iowa City. The denial of entry cost the Orange Krush $6,000 that had been paid towards the prearranged transportation. As for the 200 tickets retained by the Iowa Athletic Department, those were donated to the Boys and Girls Club of Cedar Rapids.

==== Other ====
Occasional feuds and incidents between the schools' programs have fueled the competition over the years. Neither team has the advantage in the history of the Big Ten tournament. Of the 20+ years the conference tournament has been held, Illinois and Iowa have played a total of six times, with each team winning three games. In the 2016 Big Ten tournament the Hawkeyes were the fifth seed and the Illini, who were seeded twelfth, faced each other in the second round with Illinois upsetting Iowa 68–66. Illinois and Iowa squared off in the 2021 Big Ten tournament semi-final where Illinois would win and later go on to win their third tournament title.

The schools faced off in the NCAA tournament for the first time during the 2026 edition. They met in the Elite 8 of the south region, with Illinois winning 71–59 after a close battle where Iowa lead by as much as 10 points.

=== Accomplishments ===
The following summarizes the accomplishments of the two programs.

Team	Illinois	Iowa
National titles	0	0
Final Four appearances	6	3
NCAA Tournament appearances	36	30
NCAA Tournament record	45–35	31–31
Big Ten tournament titles	4	3
Big Ten regular season titles	18	8
Consensus First Team All-Americans	16	4
Naismith Players of the Year	0	1
Big Ten Players of the Year	3	1
Big Ten Medal of Honor Recipients	19	18
All-time program record	1876–1054	1740–1217–1
All-time winning percentage	.640	.588

- Through March 16, 2023

=== Game results ===
==== Games with both teams ranked ====
(Rankings are from AP Poll)

Winning team is shown. Ranking of the team at the time of the game by the AP poll is shown under the team name.

Date	Illinois rank	Iowa rank	Winner	Score
February 9, 1952	3	9	Iowa	73–68
February 23, 1952	5	4	Illinois	78–62
January 17, 1955	7	19	Iowa	92–80
February 21, 1955	14	15	Iowa	85–77
March 3, 1956	2	10	Iowa	96–72
January 3, 1980	20	10	Iowa	72–71
February 7, 1981	18	15	Iowa	72–66
January 14, 1987	8	2	Iowa	91–88^{OT}
February 14, 1987	11	4	Iowa	66–61
January 21, 1988	13	19	Iowa	93–79
February 5, 1989	2	9	Iowa	86–82
March 8, 1989	4	15	Illinois	118–94
January 15, 2002	11	17	Illinois	77–66
January 20, 2005	1	23	Illinois	73–68^{OT}
February 25, 2006	8	20	Illinois	71–59
February 2, 2020	19	18	Iowa	72–65
March 8, 2020	23	18	Illinois	78–76
January 29, 2021	19	7	Illinois	80–75
March 13, 2021	3	5	Illinois	82–71
March 6, 2022	20	24	Illinois	74–72
January 11, 2026	16	19	Illinois	75–69

=== Game results ===
Winning team is shown. Ranking of the team at the time of the game by the AP poll is shown by the team name.

Illinois victories	Iowa victories	Tie games

No.	Date	Location	Winner	Score
1	February 14, 1908	Iowa Armory	Iowa	46–36
2	January 18, 1913	Kenney Gym	Illinois	35–9
3	February 22, 1924	Iowa Armory	Illinois	26–14
4	February 29, 1924	Kenney Gym	Illinois	38–19
5	January 24, 1925	Kenney Gym	Illinois	23–15
6	February 27, 1925	Iowa Armory	Iowa	33–25
7	January 22, 1927	Huff Gym	Illinois	40–33
8	February 12, 1927	Iowa Armory	Iowa	26–24
9	January 13, 1928	Iowa Field House	Iowa	36–30
10	February 24, 1928	Huff Gym	Iowa	41–27
11	February 14, 1931	Iowa Field House	Illinois	26–23
12	February 28, 1931	Huff Gym	Illinois	31–13
13	February 27, 1933	Iowa Field House	Iowa	30–27
14	March 4, 1933	Huff Gym	Illinois	44–16
15	January 15, 1934	Iowa Field House	Iowa	36–14
16	February 26, 1934	Huff Gym	Illinois	35–31
17	January 11, 1936	Iowa Field House	Iowa	27–26
18	February 10, 1936	Huff Gym	Illinois	36–14
19	January 16, 1937	Huff Gym	Illinois	42–28
20	February 27, 1937	The Field House	Illinois	40–29
21	February 6, 1939	Huff Gym	Illinois	34–26
22	March 2, 1940	Iowa Field House	Iowa	62–47
23	February 17, 1941	Huff Gym	Illinois	56–53
24	January 19, 1942	Huff Gym	Illinois	42–35
25	March 2, 1942	Iowa Field House	Iowa	46–32
26	January 16, 1943	Huff Gym	Illinois	61–41
27	January 18, 1943	Huff Gym	Illinois	66–34
28	January 21, 1944	Iowa Field House	Iowa	56–51
29	January 22, 1944	Iowa Field House	Iowa	53–44
30	January 26, 1945	Huff Gym	Illinois	43–42
31	March 3, 1945	Iowa Field House	Iowa	43–37
32	December 22, 1945	Iowa Field House	Iowa	41–39
33	February 23, 1946	Huff Gym	Illinois	57–51
34	February 8, 1947	Huff Gym	Illinois	45–36
35	February 9, 1948	Iowa Field House	Iowa	70–61
36	February 21, 1949	Huff Gym	No. 4 Illinois	80–61
37	February 11, 1950	Iowa Field House	Iowa	70–65
38	January 8, 1951	Iowa Field House	Illinois	72–65
39	January 20, 1951	Huff Gym	No. 14 Illinois	69–53
40	February 9, 1952	Iowa Field House	No. 9 Iowa	73–68
41	February 23, 1952	Huff Gym	No. 5 Illinois	78–62
42	February 14, 1953	Huff Gym	No. 5 Illinois	80–63
43	February 21, 1953	Iowa Field House	Iowa	67–62
44	January 18, 1954	Huff Hall	Iowa	79–70
45	February 20, 1954	Iowa Field House	Illinois	74–51
46	January 17, 1955	Iowa Field House	No. 19 Iowa	92–80
47	February 22, 1955	Huff Gym	No. 15 Iowa	89–70
48	March 3, 1956	Iowa Field House	No. 10 Iowa	92–72
49	January 7, 1957	Huff Gym	No. 5 Illinois	81–70
50	January 6, 1958	Huff Gym	Iowa	70–68
51	February 22, 1958	Iowa Field House	Iowa	83–79
52	January 12, 1959	Huff Gym	No. 20 Illinois	103–97
53	February 28, 1959	Iowa Field House	Illinois	72–70
54	February 27, 1960	Huff Gym	No. 20 Illinois	85–70
55	January 16, 1961	Iowa Field House	No. 6 Iowa	78–71
56	February 10, 1962	Iowa Field House	Illinois	91–81
57	March 3, 1962	Huff Gym	Iowa	88–78
58	January 5, 1963	Iowa Field House	No. 3 Illinois	85–76
59	March 9, 1963	Assembly Hall	No. 8 Illinois	73–69
60	January 11, 1964	Iowa Field House	Illinois	87–70
61	March 4, 1964	Assembly Hall	Illinois	90–67
62	February 23, 1965	Assembly Hall	Illinois	97–80
63	March 6, 1965	Iowa Field House	Iowa	94–84
64	March 5, 1966	Assembly Hall	Illinois	106–90
65	February 7, 1967	Iowa Field House	Iowa	96–89
66	February 3, 1968	Assembly Hall	Illinois	66–63
67	March 2, 1968	Iowa Field House	Iowa	61–56
68	February 8, 1969	Assembly Hall	No. 10 Illinois	98–69
69	February 25, 1969	Iowa Field House	Iowa	74–53
70	February 17, 1970	Assembly Hall	No. 11 Iowa	83–81
71	March 2, 1971	Iowa Field House	Iowa	92–84
72	February 15, 1972	Iowa Field House	Iowa	87–84
73	March 7, 1972	Assembly Hall	Illinois	91–84
74	January 13, 1973	Assembly Hall	Illinois	80–78
75	March 10, 1973	Iowa Field House	Iowa	93–76
76	February 23, 1974	Assembly Hall	Illinois	91–84
77	January 4, 1975	Iowa Field House	Iowa	95–70
78	March 8, 1975	Assembly Hall	Iowa	73–70
79	January 3, 1976	Iowa Field House	Iowa	84–60
80	March 6, 1976	Assembly Hall	Iowa	82–70
81	January 15, 1977	Assembly Hall	Iowa	84–81^{OT}
82	February 24, 1977	Iowa Field House	Iowa	76–64
83	January 26, 1978	Iowa Field House	Illinois	70–61
84	February 18, 1978	Assembly Hall	Illinois	77–76
85	January 25, 1979	Iowa Field House	Iowa	58–52
86	February 17, 1979	Assembly Hall	No. 14 Iowa	67–53
87	January 3, 1980	Assembly Hall	No. 10 Iowa	72–71

No.	Date	Location	Winner	Score
88	March 1, 1980	Iowa Field House	Iowa	75–71
89	January 31, 1981	Assembly Hall	Illinois	79–66
90	February 7, 1981	Iowa Field House	No. 15 Iowa	72–66
91	January 9, 1982	Iowa Field House	No. 7 Iowa	56–50
92	March 4, 1982	Assembly Hall	Illinois	73–67^{OT}
93	February 3, 1983	Assembly Hall	Illinois	62–61
94	February 12, 1983	Carver–Hawkeye Arena	No. 20 Iowa	68–66
95	February 2, 1984	Carver–Hawkeye Arena	No. 8 Illinois	54–52^{OT}
96	February 12, 1984	Assembly Hall	No. 8 Illinois	73–53
97	January 5, 1985	Carver–Hawkeye Arena	Iowa	64–60
98	March 7, 1985	Assembly Hall	No. 14 Illinois	59–53^{OT}
99	January 4, 1986	Assembly Hall	Iowa	60–59
100	March 6, 1986	Carver–Hawkeye Arena	Iowa	57–53
101	January 14, 1987	Assembly Hall	No. 8 Iowa	91–88^{OT}
102	February 14, 1987	Carver–Hawkeye Arena	No. 4 Iowa	66–61
103	January 21, 1988	Carver–Hawkeye Arena	No. 19 Iowa	93–79
104	March 6, 1988	Assembly Hall	Illinois	94–81
105	February 5, 1989	Carver–Hawkeye Arena	No. 9 Iowa	86–82
106	March 8, 1989	Assembly Hall	No. 4 Illinois	118–94
107	January 29, 1990	Carver–Hawkeye Arena	Iowa	69–67
108	March 4, 1990	Assembly Hall	No. 18 Illinois	118–85
109	January 28, 1991	Assembly Hall	Illinois	53–50
110	February 23, 1991	Carver–Hawkeye Arena	Illinois	79–74
111	January 15, 1992	Carver–Hawkeye Arena	Iowa	74–69
112	February 23, 1992	Assembly Hall	Illinois	77–72^{OT}
113	February 4, 1993	Assembly Hall	Illinois	78–77
114	March 13, 1993	Carver–Hawkeye Arena	No. 17 Iowa	63–53
115	January 19, 1994	Assembly Hall	Illinois	105–90
116	February 19, 1994	Carver–Hawkeye Arena	Iowa	83–69
117	February 1, 1995	Carver–Hawkeye Arena	Illinois	79–74
118	February 11, 1995	Assembly Hall	Illinois	104–97^{OT}
119	January 18, 1996	Carver–Hawkeye Arena	No. 16 Iowa	82–79
120	February 24, 1996	Assembly Hall	Illinois	91–86
121	January 29, 1997	Carver–Hawkeye Arena	Iowa	82–65
122	February 9, 1997	Assembly Hall	Illinois	66–51
123	January 8, 1998	Carver–Hawkeye Arena	Illinois	76–64
124	February 22, 1998	Assembly Hall	No. 23 Illinois	79–72
125	January 7, 1999	Carver–Hawkeye Arena	No. 17 Iowa	84–62
126	February 21, 1999	Assembly Hall	No. 20 Iowa	78–72
127	January 26, 2000	Carver–Hawkeye Arena	Illinois	69–58
128	February 12, 2000	Assembly Hall	Illinois	78–50
129	January 11, 2001	Carver–Hawkeye Arena	Iowa	78–62
130	February 24, 2001	Assembly Hall	No. 3 Illinois	89–63
131	January 15, 2002	Assembly Hall	No. 11 Illinois	77–66
132	January 15, 2003	Carver–Hawkeye Arena	Iowa	68–61
133	January 17, 2004	Assembly Hall	No. 25 Illinois	88–82
134	February 25, 2004	Carver–Hawkeye Arena	No. 23 Illinois	78–59
135	January 20, 2005	Assembly Hall	No. 1 Illinois	73–68^{OT}
136	February 19, 2005	Carver–Hawkeye Arena	No. 1 Illinois	75–65
137	January 7, 2006	Carver–Hawkeye Arena	Iowa	63–48
138	February 25, 2006	Assembly Hall	No. 8 Illinois	71–59
139	January 10, 2007	Assembly Hall	Illinois	74–70
140	March 3, 2007	Carver–Hawkeye Arena	Iowa	60–53
141	March 1, 2008	Carver–Hawkeye Arena	Illinois	58–47
142	February 1, 2009	Assembly Hall	No. 19 Illinois	62–54
143	January 5, 2010	Assembly Hall	Illinois	59–42
144	February 3, 2010	Carver–Hawkeye Arena	Illinois	57–49
145	December 29, 2010	Carver–Hawkeye Arena	No. 23 Illinois	87–77
146	February 26, 2011	Assembly Hall	Illinois	81–68
147	February 26, 2012	Assembly Hall	Illinois	65–54
148	March 8, 2012*	Bankers Life Fieldhouse	Iowa	64–61
149	March 5, 2013	Carver–Hawkeye Arena	Iowa	63–55
150	February 1, 2014	State Farm Center	No. 15 Iowa	81–74
151	March 8, 2014	Carver–Hawkeye Arena	Illinois	66–63
152	February 25, 2015	Carver–Hawkeye Arena	Iowa	68–60
153	February 7, 2016	State Farm Center	No. 5 Iowa	77–65
154	March 10, 2016*	Bankers Life Fieldhouse	Illinois	68–66
155	January 25, 2017	State Farm Center	Illinois	76–64
156	February 18, 2017	Carver–Hawkeye Arena	Illinois	70–66
157	January 11, 2018	State Farm Center	Iowa	104–97^{OT}
158	February 28, 2018*	Madison Square Garden	No. 12 Iowa	96–87
159	January 20, 2019	Carver–Hawkeye Arena	No. 23 Iowa	95–71
160	March 14, 2019*	United Center	No. 6 Iowa	83–62
161	February 2, 2020	Carver–Hawkeye Arena	No. 18 Iowa	72–65
162	March 8, 2020	State Farm Center	No. 23 Illinois	78–76
163	January 29, 2021	State Farm Center	No. 19 Illinois	80–75
164	March 13, 2021*	Lucas Oil Stadium	No. 3 Illinois	82–71
165	December 6, 2021	Carver–Hawkeye Arena	Illinois	87–83
166	March 6, 2022	State Farm Center	No. 20 Illinois	74–72
167	February 4, 2023	Carver–Hawkeye Arena	Iowa	81–79
168	February 24, 2024	State Farm Center	No. 12 Illinois	95–85
169	March 10, 2024	Carver–Hawkeye Arena	No. 12 Illinois	73–61
170	February 25, 2025	State Farm Center	Illinois	81–61
171	March 16, 2025*	Gainbridge Fieldhouse	No. 24 Illinois	106–94
172	January 11, 2026	Carver–Hawkeye Arena	No. 16 Illinois	75–69
173	March 28, 2026*	Toyota Center	No. 13 Illinois	71–59
Series: Illinois leads 96–77

- *Denotes game played during the Big Ten tournament or the NCAA tournament

=== Series statistics ===
- Series Record: Illinois leads 96 to 77
- Current Streak: Illinois, 6 wins
- Illinois when ranked: 33–22
- Iowa when ranked: 24–17
- When both teams are ranked: Iowa leads 11–10
- Illinois when unranked: 62–54
- Iowa when unranked: 52–73
- When both teams are unranked: Illinois leads 51–40
- In overtime games: Illinois leads 6–3
- Neutral site: Illinois 4–3
- Longest Illinois W-Streak: 7 (3/1/2008 – 2/26/2012)
- Longest Iowa W-Streak: 6 (1/4/1975 – 2/24/1977)
- Longest Illinois Home W-Streak: 17 (2/28/1931 – 2/14/1953)
- Longest Iowa Home W-Streak: 10 (3/6/1965 – 2/24/1977)
- Longest Illinois Road W-Streak: 3, twice (last, 3/1/2008 – 12/29/2010)
- Longest Iowa Road W-Streak: 3 (3/8/1975 – 1/15/1977)
- Largest Illinois Win Margin: 33 (118–85), 3/4/1990 at ILL
- Largest Illinois Road Win Margin: 23 (74–51), 2/20/1954
- Largest Iowa Win Margin: 25 (95–70), 1/4/1975 at IOWA
- Largest Iowa Road Win Margin: 19 (89–70), 2/21/1955

== Football ==
Illinois–Iowa football rivalry
- Illinois Fighting Illini Iowa Hawkeyes
- Sport: American football
- First meeting: November 30, 1899; Iowa, 58–0
- Latest meeting: November 21, 2026; Iowa, 34–17
- Next meeting: 2028
- Trophy: None

Statistics
- Total meetings: 80
- All-time series: Tied, 39–39–2
- Largest victory: Illinois, 80–0 (1902)
- Longest win streak: Illinois, 12 (1942–67)
- Current win streak: Iowa, 2 (2023–present)

The Illinois–Iowa football rivalry is an American college football rivalry game between the Illinois Fighting Illini and Iowa Hawkeyes. The series dates back to the first meeting in 1899 and has been played 79 times. When the Big Ten split into non-geographical "Leaders" and "Legends" divisions in 2011, The Illini and Hawkeyes were placed in opposite divisions and weren't designated as protected annual cross-divisional so the series became intermittent again. However, in 2014, the conference scrapped that divisional format in favor of a more geographically friendly "East" and West" divisional arrangement. In so doing, the Big Ten placed both Illinois and Iowa in the West division which revived the annual rivalry once again.

Perhaps the 1952 game is the most notable matchup in the history of the football rivalry. Illinois won 33–13, but the game is more known for egregious Hawkeye penalties, angry Iowa fans throwing apples at Illini football players and a punch thrown between players on both teams that lead to the Big Ten suspending the series indefinitely. The conference would not lift the indefinite suspension until 1967, the longest break in the history of the football rivalry.

=== Game results ===
Illinois victories	Iowa victories	Tie games

No.	Date	Location	Winner	Score
1	November 30, 1899	Rock Island, IL	Iowa	58–0
2	November 9, 1901	Iowa City, IA	Illinois	27–0
3	November 27, 1902	Champaign, IL	Illinois	80–0
4	November 21, 1903	Iowa City, IA	Iowa	12–0
5	November 19, 1904	Champaign, IL	Illinois	29–0
6	November 9, 1907	Iowa City, IA	Iowa	25–12
7	November 7, 1908	Champaign, IL	Illinois	22–0
8	November 2, 1918	Iowa City, IA	Illinois	19–0
9	October 18, 1919	Champaign, IL	Illinois	9–7
10	October 16, 1920	Champaign, IL	Illinois	20–3
11	October 15, 1921	Iowa City, IA	Iowa	14–2
12	October 21, 1922	Champaign, IL	Iowa	8–7
13	October 20, 1923	Iowa City, IA	Illinois	9–6
14	November 1, 1924	Champaign, IL	Illinois	36–0
15	October 17, 1925	Iowa City, IA	Iowa	12–10
16	October 16, 1926	Champaign, IL	Illinois	13–6
17	November 5, 1927	Iowa City, IA	Illinois	14–0
18	October 19, 1929	Iowa City, IA	Tie	7–7
19	October 26, 1935	Champaign, IL	Iowa	19–0
20	October 17, 1936	Iowa City, IA	Tie	0–0
21	November 23, 1940	Iowa City, IA	Iowa	18–7
22	November 8, 1941	Champaign, IL	Iowa	21–0
23	October 17, 1942	Iowa City, IA	No. 5 Illinois	12–7
24	November 6, 1943	Iowa City, IA	Illinois	19–10
25	October 14, 1944	Champaign, IL	No. 14 Illinois	40–6
26	November 10, 1945	Champaign, IL	Illinois	48–7
27	November 2, 1946	Iowa City, IA	No. 11 Illinois	7–0
28	October 4, 1947	Iowa City, IA	Illinois	35–12
29	November 6, 1948	Champaign, IL	Illinois	14–0
30	October 8, 1949	Iowa City, IA	Illinois	20–14
31	November 11, 1950	Iowa City, IA	No. 10 Illinois	21–7
32	November 10, 1951	Champaign, IL	No. 2 Illinois	40–13
33	November 8, 1952	Iowa City, IA	Illinois	33–13
34	November 25, 1967	Iowa City, IA	Illinois	21–19
35	November 23, 1968	Champaign, IL	Iowa	37–13
36	November 22, 1969	Champaign, IL	Iowa	40–0
37	November 21, 1970	Iowa City, IA	Iowa	22–16
38	November 20, 1971	Champaign, IL	Illinois	31–0
39	November 25, 1972	Iowa City, IA	Iowa	15–14
40	October 27, 1973	Champaign, IL	Illinois	50–0
41	October 26, 1974	Iowa City, IA	Iowa	14–12

No.	Date	Location	Winner	Score
42	September 13, 1975	Iowa City, IA	Illinois	27–12
43	September 11, 1976	Champaign, IL	Illinois	24–6
44	October 6, 1979	Champaign, IL	Iowa	13–7
45	October 11, 1980	Iowa City, IA	Illinois	20–14
46	October 31, 1981	Champaign, IL	Illinois	24–7
47	October 30, 1982	Iowa City, IA	Iowa	14–13
48	October 1, 1983	Champaign, IL	Illinois	33–0
49	September 29, 1984	Iowa City, IA	Iowa	21–16
50	November 9, 1985	Iowa City, IA	No. 6 Iowa	59–0
51	November 8, 1986	Champaign, IL	Illinois	20–16
52	November 4, 1989	Iowa City, IA	No. 8 Illinois	31–7
53	November 3, 1990	Champaign, IL	No. 13 Iowa	54–28
54	October 19, 1991	Iowa City, IA	No. 15 Iowa	24–21
55	October 17, 1992	Champaign, IL	Iowa	24–14
56	October 16, 1993	Iowa City, IA	Illinois	49–3
57	October 15, 1994	Champaign, IL	Illinois	47–7
58	November 4, 1995	Iowa City, IA	Illinois	26–7
59	November 2, 1996	Champaign, IL	No. 25 Iowa	31–21
60	September 27, 1997	Iowa City, IA	No. 11 Iowa	38–10
61	September 26, 1998	Champaign, IL	Iowa	37–14
62	November 6, 1999	Iowa City, IA	Illinois	40–24
63	October 14, 2000	Champaign, IL	Illinois	31–0
64	November 1, 2003	Iowa City, IA	No. 13 Iowa	41–10
65	October 30, 2004	Champaign, IL	No. 23 Iowa	23–13
66	October 1, 2005	Iowa City, IA	Iowa	35–7
67	September 23, 2006	Champaign, IL	No. 14 Iowa	24–7
68	October 13, 2007	Iowa City, IA	Iowa	10–6
69	November 1, 2008	Champaign, IL	Illinois	27–24
70	November 15, 2014	Champaign, IL	Iowa	30–14
71	October 10, 2015	Iowa City, IA	No. 22 Iowa	29–20
72	November 19, 2016	Champaign, IL	Iowa	28–0
73	October 7, 2017	Iowa City, IA	Iowa	45–16
74	November 17, 2018	Champaign, IL	Iowa	63–0
75	November 23, 2019	Iowa City, IA	No. 17 Iowa	19–10
76	December 5, 2020	Champaign, IL	No. 19 Iowa	35–21
77	November 20, 2021	Iowa City, IA	No. 17 Iowa	33–23
78	October 8, 2022	Champaign, IL	Illinois	9–6
79	November 18, 2023	Iowa City, IA	No. 16 Iowa	15–13
80	November 21, 2026	Champaign, IL	No. 15 Iowa	34–17
Series: Tied 39–39–2

Game results sources:

== See also ==
- List of NCAA college football rivalry games
- List of Big Ten Conference football rivalry games
