= 1947–48 Washington State Cougars men's basketball team =

American college basketball season

1947–48 Washington State Cougars men's basketball
- Conference: Pacific Coast Conference
- Record: 19–10 (9–7 PCC)
- Head coach: Jack Friel (20th season)
- Home arena: Bohler Gymnasium

1947–48 Pacific Coast Conference men's basketball standings
| | Conf. | | | | Overall |
| Team | W | | L | PCT | W | | L | PCT |
|---|---|---|---|---|---|---|---|---|
North
| Washington † | 10 | – | 6 | .625 | 23 | – | 11 | .676 |
| Oregon State | 10 | – | 6 | .625 | 21 | – | 13 | .618 |
| Washington State | 9 | – | 7 | .563 | 19 | – | 10 | .655 |
| Oregon | 8 | – | 8 | .500 | 18 | – | 11 | .621 |
| Idaho | 3 | – | 13 | .188 | 17 | – | 15 | .531 |
South
| California | 11 | – | 1 | .917 | 25 | – | 9 | .735 |
| USC | 7 | – | 5 | .583 | 14 | – | 10 | .583 |
| UCLA | 3 | – | 9 | .250 | 12 | – | 13 | .480 |
| Stanford | 3 | – | 9 | .250 | 15 | – | 11 | .577 |
† Conference playoff series winner

The 1947–48 Washington State Cougars men's basketball team represented Washington State College for the 1947–48 college basketball season. Led by twentieth-year head coach Jack Friel, the Cougars were members of the Pacific Coast Conference and played their home games on campus at Bohler Gymnasium in Pullman, Washington.

The Cougars were 19–10 overall in the regular season and 9–7 in conference play, third place in the Northern division.
