= BYU Cougars men's basketball statistical leaders =

The BYU Cougars basketball statistical leaders are individual statistical leaders of the BYU Cougars men's basketball program in various categories, including points, rebounds, assists, three-pointers, steals, and blocks. Within those areas, the lists identify single-game, single-season, and career leaders. The Cougars represent Brigham Young University in the NCAA Division I Big 12 Conference.

BYU began competing in intercollegiate basketball in 1902. However, the school's record book does not generally list records from before the 1950s, as records from before this period are often incomplete and inconsistent. Since scoring was much lower in this era, and teams played much fewer games during a typical season, it is likely that few or no players from this era would appear on these lists anyway.

Official NCAA records date only to the 1937–38 season, the start of what it calls the "modern era" of basketball. That season was the first after the center jump after each made basket was abolished. Weekly recording of scoring leaders started in 1947–48. Rebounding and assists were added in the 1950–51 season. While rebounding has been recorded in each subsequent season, the NCAA stopped recording assists after the 1951–52 season, and did not reinstate assists as an official statistic until 1983–84. Blocks and steals were added in 1985–86, and three-pointers were first officially recorded in 1986–87, the first season in which the three-pointer was mandatory throughout NCAA Division I men's basketball. Apart from three-pointers, which have only been recorded since the three-point shot was nationally adopted, BYU's record book includes all seasons, whether or not the NCAA officially recorded those statistics in the relevant seasons.

A recent NCAA rule change likely to significantly affect future career leaderboards was introduced in 2026 with full implementation starting with the 2027 freshman class. Going forward, redshirting will be prohibited, but players will have five years of full athletic eligibility, provided that they are no older than 19 when they first enroll in a postsecondary institution—with a caveat especially relevant to BYU. This rule change specifically maintained the NCAA's longstanding practice of not counting time spent on religious missions against athletic eligibility. With most male LDS Church members, including many future BYU players, going on missions immediately after high school graduation, their eligibility clock will not start until after they complete their two-year mission term. Players who had remaining eligibility under previous rules at the end of the 2025 season will benefit from the new rule.

These lists are updated through the end of the 2025–26 season.

== Scoring ==
Career
Rk	Player	Points	Seasons
1	Tyler Haws	2,720	2009–10 2012–13 2013–14 2014–15
2	Jimmer Fredette	2,599	2007–08 2008–09 2009–10 2010–11
3	Danny Ainge	2,467	1977–78 1978–79 1979–80 1980–81
4	Michael Smith	2,319	1983–84 1986–87 1987–88 1988–89
5	Devin Durrant	2,285	1978–79 1979–80 1982–83 1983–84
6	Yoeli Childs	2,031	2016–17 2017–18 2018–19 2019–20
7	T.J. Haws	1,899	2016–17 2017–18 2018–19 2019–20
8	Russell Larson	1,885	1991–92 1992–93 1993–94 1994–95
9	Fred Roberts	1,841	1978–79 1979–80 1980–81 1981–82
10	Jeff Chatman	1,824	1984–85 1985–86 1986–87 1987–88

Season
Rk	Player	Points	Season
1	Jimmer Fredette	1,068	2010–11
2	AJ Dybantsa	894	2025–26
3	Devin Durrant	866	1983–84
4	Danny Ainge	782	1980–81
5	Tyler Haws	780	2012–13
6	Tyler Haws	776	2014–15
7	Tyler Haws	767	2013–14
8	Michael Smith	765	1988–89
9	Jimmer Fredette	751	2009–10
10	Eric Mika	691	2016–17

Single game
Rk	Player	Points	Season	Opponent
1	Jimmer Fredette	52	2010–11	New Mexico
2	Jimmer Fredette	49	2009–10	Arizona
3	Tyler Haws	48	2013–14	Portland
4	Bob Skousen	47	1961–62	UCLA
	Jimmer Fredette	47	2010–11	Utah
6	Jimmer Fredette	45	2009–10	TCU
7	Dave Eastis	44	1959–60	New Mexico
8	Jimmer Fredette	43	2010–11	San Diego State
	AJ Dybantsa	43	2025–26	Utah
10	Jimmer Fredette	42	2010–11	Colorado State
	Tyler Haws	42	2012–13	Virginia Tech

== Rebounds ==
Career
Rk	Player	Rebounds	Seasons
1	Yoeli Childs	1,053	2016–17 2017–18 2018–19 2019–20
2	Kyle Collinsworth	1,047	2010–11 2013–14 2014–15 2015–16
3	Michael Smith	922	1983–84 1986–87 1987–88 1988–89
3	Kresimir Cosic	919	1970–71 1971–72 1972–73
	Alan Taylor	919	1976–77 1977–78 1978–79 1979–80
6	Fousseyni Traore	868	2021–22 2022–23 2023–24 2024–25
7	Greg Kite	847	1979–80 1980–81 1981–82 1982–83
8	Brandon Davies	840	2009–10 2010–11 2011–12 2012–13
9	Fred Roberts	838	1978–79 1979–80 1980–81 1981–82
10	Steve Trumbo	835	1978–79 1979–80 1980–81 1981–82

Season
Rk	Player	Rebounds	Season
1	Mel Hutchins	471	1950–51
2	Brett Applegate	352	1983–84
3	John Fairchild	348	1964–65
4	Steve Trumbo	342	1980–81
5	Kresimir Cosic	341	1970–71
6	Steve Trumbo	335	1981–82
7	Kresimir Cosic	332	1971–72
8	John Fairchild	330	1963–64
9	John Benson	317	1956–57
	Alan Taylor	317	1979–80

Single game
Rk	Player	Rebounds	Season	Opponent
1	Scott Warner	27	1969–70	Texas Tech
2	John Benson	26	1956–57	Washington
3	Mel Hutchins	25	1950–51	Denver
	John Benson	25	1955–56	Utah State
	Bruce Burton	25	1961–62	Denver
	John Fairchild	25	1963–64	Michigan State
7	Mel Hutchins	23	1950–51	Utah
	Nick Mateljan	23	1953–54	Duke
	Kresimir Cosic	23	1970–71	UCLA
	Mark Handy	23	1974–75	Wyoming
	Alan Taylor	23	1979–80	San Diego State
	Steve Trumbo	23	1981–82	Air Force

== Assists ==
Career
Rk	Player	Assists	Seasons
1	Kyle Collinsworth	703	2010–11 2013–14 2014–15 2015–16
2	T. J. Haws	603	2016–17 2017–18 2018–19 2019–20
3	Matt Montague	570	1996–97 1999–00 2000–01 2001–02
4	Danny Ainge	539	1977–78 1978–79 1979–80 1980–81
5	Nathan Call	528	1986–87 1987–88 1990–91 1991–92
6	Jimmer Fredette	515	2007–08 2008–09 2009–10 2010–11
7	Marty Haws	502	1986–87 1987–88 1988–89 1989–90
8	Randy Reid	458	1992–93 1993–94 1994–95 1995–96
9	Matt Carlino	437	2011–12 2012–13 2013–14
10	Dallin Hall	413	2022–23 2023–24 2024–25

Season
Rk	Player	Assists	Season
1	Kyle Collinsworth	275	2015–16
2	Matt Montague	217	2001–02
3	Nathan Call	204	1991–92
4	Kyle Collinsworth	197	2014–15
5	T. J. Haws	185	2019–20
6	Egor Dëmin	180	2024–25
7	Dallin Hall	172	2023–24
8	Matt Carlino	171	2012–13
9	Nathan Call	164	1990–91
10	T. J. Haws	162	2018–19
	Robert Wright III	162	2025–26

Single game
Rk	Player	Assists	Season	Opponent
1	Mike May	16	1976–77	Niagara
	Kyle Collinsworth	16	2015–16	Portland
3	Matt Montague	15	2001–02	Idaho
	Matt Montague	15	2001–02	Wyoming
	Kyle Collinsworth	15	2015–16	Loyola Marymount
6	Randy Reid	14	1995–96	Texas Tech
	T. J. Haws	14	2019–20	Portland
8	Danny Ainge	13	1977–78	Long Beach State
	Scott Sinek	13	1981–82	Utah State
	Nathan Call	13	1991–92	New Mexico
	T. J. Haws	13	2019–20	Pepperdine

== Three-pointers ==
Career
Rk	Player	3FG	Seasons
1	Jimmer Fredette	296	2007–08 2008–09 2009–10 2010–11
2	Jonathan Tavernari	265	2006–07 2007–08 2008–09 2009–10
3	T. J. Haws	242	2016–17 2017–18 2018–19 2019–20
4	Trevin Knell	239	2019–20 2020–21 2021–22 2023–24 2024–25
5	Jackson Emery	230	2005–06 2008–09 2009–10 2010–11
6	Chase Fischer	215	2014–15 2015–16
7	Mark Bigelow	213	1998–99 2001–02 2002–03 2003–04
8	Richie Saunders	203	2022–23 2023–24 2024–25 2025–26
–	Nick Emery	199 (Note: Nick Emery's statistics from 2015–2017 are not officially counted by the NCAA due to NCAA sanctions. BYU includes Emery's statistics from those seasons in its record book, but not in any official leaderboard, specifically citing said NCAA sanctions.)	2015–16 2016–17 2018–19
9	Alex Barcello	194	2019–20 2020–21 2021–22
10	Zac Seljaas	171	2015–16 2017–18 2018–19 2019–20

Season
Rk	Player	3FG	Season
1	Jimmer Fredette	124	2010–11
2	Chase Fischer	112	2015–16
3	Chase Fischer	103	2014–15
–	Nick Emery	97	2015–16
4	Jackson Emery	92	2010–11
5	Jonathan Tavernari	88	2007–08
5	Alex Barcello	88	2021–22
7	Jonathan Tavernari	85	2008–09
7	Jackson Emery	85	2009–10
7	Elijah Bryant	85	2017–18
7	Jake Toolson	85	2018–19

Single game
Rk	Player	3FG	Season	Opponent
–	Nick Emery	10	2015–16	San Francisco
1	Chase Fischer	10	2014–15	Chaminade
2	Jimmer Fredette	9	2009–10	Arizona
2	Chase Fischer	9	2015–16	New Mexico
2	Alex Barcello	9	2021–22	Pepperdine
2	Travis Knell	9	2023–24	Cincinnati
6	Mike Rose	8	2003–04	Southern Utah
6	Mike Rose	8	2006–07	UNLV
6	Matt Carlino	8	2013–14	Pepperdine
6	Jaxson Robinson	8	2023–24	Denver
10	9 times by 7 players	7	Most recent: Jake Toolson, 2019–20 vs. Pepperdine	

== Steals ==
Career
Rk	Player	Steals	Seasons
1	Jackson Emery	249	2005–06 2008–09 2009–10 2010–11
2	Kyle Collinsworth	229	2010–11 2013–14 2014–15 2015–16
3	Danny Ainge	195	1977–78 1978–79 1979–80 1980–81
4	Marty Haws	182	1986–87 1987–88 1988–89 1989–90
5	Jimmer Fredette	167	2007–08 2008–09 2009–10 2010–11
6	Jonathan Tavernari	165	2006–07 2007–08 2008–09 2009–10
7	Matt Carlino	161	2011–12 2012–13 2013–14
8	TJ Haws	158	2016–17 2017–18 2018–19 2019–20
9	Scott Sinek	140	1981–82 1982–83 1983–84 1984–85
10	Nathan Call	138	1986–87 1987–88 1990–91 1991–92
	Tyler Haws	138	2009–10 2012–13 2013–14 2014–15

Season
Rk	Player	Steals	Season
1	Jackson Emery	101	2010–11
2	Jackson Emery	91	2009–10
3	Kyle Collinsworth	74	2015–16
4	Marty Haws	66	1989–90
5	Matt Carlino	64	2012–13
6	Terrell Lyday	62	1999–00
7	Robbie Reid	61	1994–95
	Matt Carlino	61	2013–14
9	Danny Ainge	60	1977–78
10	Kyle Collinsworth	59	2014–15

Single game
Rk	Player	Steals	Season	Opponent
1	Mark Bigelow	9	1998–99	Arizona
2	Brandon Davies	8	2011–12	Portland
3	Matt Carlino	7	2013–14	Portland
4	Marty Perry	6	1983–84	Oregon
	Andy Toolson	6	1988–89	Miami
	Scott Sinek	6	1984–85	Washington
	Brent Stephenson	6	1985–86	Hawaii
	Marty Haws	6	1989–90	Utah State
	Nathan Call	6	1990–91	Utah State
	Robbie Reid	6	1994–95	Nevada
	Terrell Lyday	6	1999–00	UC Santa Barbara
	Terrell Lyday	6	1999–00	UNLV
	Jackson Emery	6	2008–09	Air Force
	Jackson Emery	6	2009–10	Utah
	Jackson Emery	6	2010–11	UTEP
	Jackson Emery	6	2010–11	Utah
	Brandon Davies	6	2011–12	Gonzaga
	Anson Winder	6	2013–14	Loyola Marymount
	Kyle Collinsworth	6	2014–15	Purdue

== Blocks ==
Career
Rk	Player	Blocks	Seasons
1	Greg Kite	208	1979–80 1980–81 1981–82 1982–83
2	Shawn Bradley	177	1990–91
	Noah Hartsock	177	2008–09 2009–10 2010–11 2011–12
4	Russell Larson	166	1991–92 1992–93 1993–94 1994–95
5	Yoeli Childs	159	2016–17 2017–18 2018–19 2019–20
6	Brandon Davies	123	2009–10 2010–11 2011–12 2012–13
7	Alan Taylor	119	1976–77 1977–78 1978–79 1979–80
8	Trent Plaisted	107	2004–05 2005–06 2006–07 2007–08
	Jeff Chatman	107	1984–85 1985–86 1986–87 1987–88
10	Lee Cummard	106	2005–06 2006–07 2007–08 2008–09

Season
Rk	Player	Blocks	Season
1	Shawn Bradley	177	1990–91
2	Greg Kite	81	1982–83
3	Greg Kite	71	1980–81
4	Eric Mika	63	2016–17
	Yoeli Childs	63	2017–18
6	Noah Hartsock	61	2010–11
7	Keba Keita	58	2025–26
8	Noah Hartsock	55	2011–12
9	Alan Taylor	52	1979–80
10	Kyle Davis	50	2015–16
	Matt Haarms	50	2020–21

Single game
Rk	Player	Blocks	Season	Opponent
1	Shawn Bradley	14	1990–91	Eastern Kentucky
2	Shawn Bradley	10	1990–91	Virginia
3	Alan Taylor	9	1979–80	New Mexico
	Shawn Bradley	9	1990–91	Wyoming
	Shawn Bradley	9	1990–91	Tulsa
6	Greg Kite	8	1982–83	New Mexico
7	Greg Kite	7	1982–83	Colorado State
	Shawn Bradley	7	1990–91	Utah State
	Shawn Bradley	7	1990–91	Arizona State
	Shawn Bradley	7	1990–91	South Carolina
	Shawn Bradley	7	1990–91	Colorado State
	Keba Keita	7	2025–26	Miami (FL)
