= List of BYU Cougars men's basketball seasons =

This is a list of seasons completed by the BYU Cougars men's basketball team since the team's formation in 1902. They have been conference regular season champions 30 times and conference tournament champions 3 times. They have also appeared in 33 NCAA basketball tournaments, reaching the Elite Eight 3 times.

== Seasons ==
Statistics overview
Season	Coach	Overall	Conference	Standing	Postseason
W.A. Colton (Independent) (1902–1905)
1902–03	W.A. Colton	4–5			
1903–04	W.A. Colton	3–3			
1904–05	W.A. Colton	9–3			
C.T. Teezel (Independent) (1905–1908)
1905–06	C.T. Teezel	11–1			
1906–07	C.T. Teezel	7–3			
1907–08	C.T. Teezel	4–2			
Fred Bennion (Independent) (1908–1910)
1908–09	Fred Bennion	7–4			
1909–10	Fred Bennion	9–2			
Henry Rose (Independent) (1910–1911)
1910–11	Henry Rose	8–0			
E.L. Roberts (Independent) (1911–1917)
1911–12	E.L. Roberts	7–0			
1912–13	E.L. Roberts	7–3			
1913–14	E.L. Roberts	8–2			
1914–15	E.L. Roberts	6–2			
1915–16	E.L. Roberts	3–3			
1916–17	E.L. Roberts	14–2			
E.L. Roberts (Rocky Mountain Athletic Conference) (1917–1920)
1917–18	E.L. Roberts	5–3	1–1		AAU Runner–up
1918–19	E.L. Roberts	5–3	1–1	3rd	
1919–20	E.L. Roberts	4–2	0–2	T–3rd	
Alvin Twitchell (Rocky Mountain Athletic Conference) (1920–1925)
1920–21	Alvin Twitchell	10–2	2–2	2nd	
1921–22	Alvin Twitchell	9–3	3–1	1st	
1922–23	Alvin Twitchell	7–5	4–4	T–2nd	
1923–24	Alvin Twitchell	14–4	6–2	1st	
1924–25	Alvin Twitchell	10–6	7–1	1st	
E.L. Roberts (Rocky Mountain Athletic Conference) (1925–1928)
1925–26	E.L. Roberts	11–5	7–5	2nd	
1926–27	E.L. Roberts	5–14	1–11	4th	
1927–28	E.L. Roberts	13–10	3–9	4th	
G. Ott Romney (Rocky Mountain Athletic Conference) (1928–1935)
1928–29	G. Ott Romney	20–10	6–6	T–2nd	
1929–30	G. Ott Romney	23–7	6–6	3rd	
1930–31	G. Ott Romney	20–13	7–5	T–2nd	
1931–32	G. Ott Romney	20–12	8–4	T–1st	
1932–33	G. Ott Romney	20–7	9–3	T–1st	
1933–34	G. Ott Romney	18–12	9–3	1st	
1934–35	G. Ott Romney	18–10	6–6	2nd	
Edwin R. Kimball (Rocky Mountain Athletic Conference) (1935–1936)
1935–36	Edwin R. Kimball	16–9	6–6	2nd	
Buck Dixon (Rocky Mountain Athletic Conference) (1936–1937)
1936–37	Buck Dixon	17–10	5–7	T–3rd	
Buck Dixon (Skyline Conference) (1937–1938)
1937–38	Buck Dixon	8–13	4–8	5th	
Edwin R. Kimball (Skyline Conference) (1938–1941)
1938–39	Edwin R. Kimball	12–12	4–8	T–5th	
1939–40	Edwin R. Kimball	17–8	7–5	T–3rd	
1940–41	Edwin R. Kimball	14–9	6–6	4th	
Floyd Millet (Skyline Conference) (1941–1949)
1941–42	Floyd Millet	17–3	9–3	T–2nd	
1942–43	Floyd Millet	15–7	7–1	1st	
1943–44	Floyd Millet	3–2	—		
1944–45	Floyd Millet	11–12	—		
1945–46	Floyd Millet	12–13	6–6	T–4th	
1946–47	Floyd Millet	9–16	3–9	6th	
1947–48	Floyd Millet	16–11	8–2	1st	NAIB Second Round
1948–49	Floyd Millet	21–13	11–9	4th	NAIB Second Round
Stan Watts (Skyline Conference) (1949–1962)
1949–50	Stan Watts	22–12	14–6	1st	NCAA Elite Eight
1950–51	Stan Watts	28–9	15–5	1st	NIT Champion; NCAA Elite Eight
1951–52	Stan Watts	14–10	9–5	T–2nd	
1952–53	Stan Watts	22–8	11–3	2nd	NIT First Round
1953–54	Stan Watts	18–11	9–5	3rd	NIT First Round
1954–55	Stan Watts	13–13	10–4	2nd	
1955–56	Stan Watts	18–8	10–4	2nd	
1956–57	Stan Watts	19–9	11–3	1st	NCAA University Division Sweet Sixteen
1957–58	Stan Watts	13–3	9–5	2nd	
1958–59	Stan Watts	15–11	8–6	4th	
1959–60	Stan Watts	8–17	5–9	5th	
1960–61	Stan Watts	15–11	9–5	3rd	
1961–62	Stan Watts	10–16	5–9	4th	
Stan Watts (Western Athletic Conference) (1962–1972)
1962–63	Stan Watts	12–14	6–4	2nd	
1963–64	Stan Watts	13–12	5–5	3rd	
1964–65	Stan Watts	21–7	8–2	1st	NCAA University Division Sweet Sixteen
1965–66	Stan Watts	20–5	6–4	2nd	NIT Champion
1966–67	Stan Watts	14–10	8–2	T–1st	
1967–68	Stan Watts	13–12	4–6	T–4th	
1968–69	Stan Watts	16–12	6–4	T–1st	NCAA University Division First Round
1969–70	Stan Watts	8–18	4–10	7th	
1970–71	Stan Watts	18–11	10–4	1st	NCAA University Division Sweet Sixteen
1971–72	Stan Watts	21–5	12–2	1st	NCAA University Division First Round
Glenn Potter (Western Athletic Conference) (1972–1975)
1972–73	Glenn Potter	19–7	9–5	T–2nd	
1973–74	Glenn Potter	11–15	6–8	6th	
1974–75	Glenn Potter	12–14	5–9	6th	
Frank Arnold (Western Athletic Conference) (1975–1983)
1975–76	Frank Arnold	12–14	10–4	5th	
1976–77	Frank Arnold	12–15	4–10	7th	
1977–78	Frank Arnold	12–18	6–8	4th	
1978–79	Frank Arnold	20–8	10–2	1st	NCAA Division I First Round
1979–80	Frank Arnold	24–5	13–1	1st	NCAA Division I First Round
1980–81	Frank Arnold	25–7	12–4	3rd	NCAA Division I Elite Eight
1981–82	Frank Arnold	17–13	9–7	T–4th	NIT First Round
1982–83	Frank Arnold	15–14	11–5	T–1st	
LaDell Andersen (Western Athletic Conference) (1983–1989)
1983–84	LaDell Andersen	20–11	12–4	2nd	NCAA Division I Second Round
1984–85	LaDell Andersen	15–14	9–7	T–3rd	
1985–86	LaDell Andersen	18–14	11–5	4th	NIT Quarterfinal
1986–87	LaDell Andersen	21–11	12–4	2nd	NCAA Division I First Round
1987–88	LaDell Andersen	26–6	13–3	1st	NCAA Division I Second Round
1988–89	LaDell Andersen	14–15	7–9	5th	
Roger Reid (Western Athletic Conference) (1989–1997)
1989–90	Roger Reid	21–9	11–5	T–1st	NCAA Division I First Round
1990–91	Roger Reid	21–13	11–5	2nd	NCAA Division I Second Round
1991–92	Roger Reid	25–7	12–4	1st	NCAA Division I First Round
1992–93	Roger Reid	25–9	15–3	T–1st	NCAA Division I Second Round
1993–94	Roger Reid	22–10	12–6	2nd	NIT Second Round
1994–95	Roger Reid	22–10	13–5	T–2nd	NCAA Division I First Round
1995–96	Roger Reid	15–13	9–9	5th	
1996–97	Roger Reid; Tony Ingle	1–25	0–16	8th	
Steve Cleveland (Western Athletic Conference) (1997–1999)
1997–98	Steve Cleveland	9–21	4–10	6th	
1998–99	Steve Cleveland	12–16	6–8	5th	
Steve Cleveland (Mountain West Conference) (1999–2005)
1999–00	Steve Cleveland	22–11	7–7	6th	NIT Quarterfinal
2000–01	Steve Cleveland	24–9	10–4	1st	NCAA Division I First Round
2001–02	Steve Cleveland	18–12	7–7	T–4th	NIT Second Round
2002–03	Steve Cleveland	23–9	11–3	T–1st	NCAA Division I First Round
2003–04	Steve Cleveland	21–9	10–4	2nd	NCAA Division I First Round
2004–05	Steve Cleveland	9–21	3–11	T–7th	
Dave Rose (Mountain West Conference) (2005–2011)
2005–06	Dave Rose	20–9	12–4	T–2nd	NIT First Round
2006–07	Dave Rose	25–9	13–3	1st	NCAA Division I First Round
2007–08	Dave Rose	27–7	14–2	1st	NCAA Division I First Round
2008–09	Dave Rose	25–8	12–4	T–1st	NCAA Division I First Round
2009–10	Dave Rose	30–5	13–3	2nd	NCAA Division I Second Round
2010–11	Dave Rose	32–5	14–2	T–1st	NCAA Division I Sweet Sixteen
Dave Rose (West Coast Conference) (2011–2019)
2011–12	Dave Rose	26–9	12–4	3rd	NCAA Division I Second Round
2012–13	Dave Rose	24–12	10–6	3rd	NIT Semifinal
2013–14	Dave Rose	23–12	13–5	2nd	NCAA Division I Second Round
2014–15	Dave Rose	25–10	13–5	2nd	NCAA Division I First Four
2015–16	Dave Rose	26–11^{[Note A]}	11–5^{[Note A]}	3rd	NIT Semifinal
2016–17	Dave Rose	22–12^{[Note B]}	12–6^{[Note B]}	3rd	NIT First Round
2017–18	Dave Rose	24–11	11–7	3rd	NIT First Round
2018–19	Dave Rose	19–13	11–5	3rd	
Mark Pope (West Coast Conference) (2019–2023)
2019–20	Mark Pope	24–8	13–3	2nd	No postseason held
2020–21	Mark Pope	20–7	10–3	2nd	NCAA Division I First Round
2021–22	Mark Pope	24–11	9–6	5th	NIT Quarterfinals
2022–23	Mark Pope	19–15	7–9	T–5th	
Mark Pope (Big 12 Conference) (2023–2024)
2023–24	Mark Pope	23–11	10–8	T–5th	NCAA Division I First Round
Kevin Young (Big 12 Conference) (2024–present)
2024–25	Kevin Young	26–10	14–6	T–3rd	NCAA Division I Sweet Sixteen
2025–26	Kevin Young	23–12	9–9	T–7th	NCAA Division I First round
Total:		1,988–1,169 (.630)			
National champion Postseason invitational champion Conference regular season champion Conference regular season and conference tournament champion Division regular season champion Division regular season and conference tournament champion Conference tournament champion

^A. Adjusted record is 1–10 (25 wins and 1 loss vacated) and 0–5 (11 wins vacated) in conference. One win was not vacated; Nick Emery (the player who was ruled ineligible) did not play in one of BYU's wins.
^B. Adjusted record is 0–11 (22 wins and 1 loss vacated) and 0–6 (12 wins vacated) in conference.
