= List of BYU Cougars men's basketball head coaches =

The following is a list of BYU Cougars men's basketball head coaches. There have been 20 head coaches of the Cougars in their 122-season history.

| No. | Tenure | Coach | Years | Record | Pct. |
|---|---|---|---|---|---|
| 1 | 1902–1903 | W. A. Colton | 1 | 4–5 | .444 |
| – | 1903–1905 | Unknown | 2 | 12–6 | .667 |
| 2 | 1905–1908 | Clayton Teetzel | 3 | 22–6 | .786 |
| 3 | 1908–1910 | Fred Bennion | 2 | 16–6 | .727 |
| 4 | 1910–1911 | Henry Rose | 1 | 8–0 | 1.000 |
| 5 | 1911–1920; 1925–1927 | E. L. Roberts | 11 | 87–49 | .640 |
| 6 | 1920–1925 | Alvin Twitchell | 5 | 49–21 | .700 |
| 7 | 1927–1935 | G. Ott Romney | 8 | 139–71 | .662 |
| 8 | 1935–1936; 1938–1941 | Eddie Kimball | 4 | 59–38 | .608 |
| 9 | 1936–1938 | Fred Dixon | 2 | 25–23 | .521 |
| 10 | 1941–1949 | Floyd Millet | 8 | 104–77 | .575 |
| 11 | 1949–1972 | Stan Watts | 23 | 371–254 | .594 |
| 12 | 1972–1975 | Glenn Potter | 3 | 42–36 | .538 |
| 13 | 1975–1983 | Frank Arnold | 8 | 137–94 | .593 |
| 14 | 1983–1989 | LaDell Andersen | 6 | 114–71 | .616 |
| 15 | 1989–1996 (Note: Reid was fired on December 17, 1996. Tony Ingle served as interim head coach for the remainder of the season.) | Roger Reid | 8 | 152–77 | .664 |
| 16 | 1996–1997* | Tony Ingle | 1 | 0–19 | .000 |
| 17 | 1997–2005 | Steve Cleveland | 8 | 138–108 | .561 |
| 18 | 2005–2019 (Note: BYU vacated 49 games from the 2015–16 and 2016–17 seasons. Rose's on-court record is 348–135 (.720).) | Dave Rose | 14 | 301–133 | .694 |
| 19 | 2019–2024 | Mark Pope | 5 | 110–52 | .679 |
| 19 | 2024–present | Kevin Young | 1 | 26–10 | .722 |
| Totals | | 20 coaches | 123 seasons | 1,937–1,178 | .622 |
Records updated through end of 2024–25 season * - Denotes interim head coach. Source
