= 2011–12 BYU Cougars men's basketball team =

American college basketball season

2011–12 BYU Cougars men's basketball

NCAA tournament, Round of 64
- Conference: West Coast Conference
- Record: 26–9 (12–4 WCC)
- Head coach: Dave Rose (7th season)
- Assistant coaches: Terry Nashif; Tim LaComb; Mark Pope
- Home arena: Marriott Center

2011–12 West Coast Conference men's basketball standings
	Conf.				Overall
Team	W		L	PCT	W		L	PCT
No. 24 Saint Mary's†	14	–	2	.875	27	–	6	.818
Gonzaga	13	–	3	.813	26	–	7	.788
BYU	12	–	4	.750	26	–	9	.743
Loyola Marymount	11	–	5	.688	21	–	13	.618
San Francisco	8	–	8	.500	20	–	14	.588
San Diego	7	–	9	.438	13	–	18	.419
Pepperdine	4	–	12	.250	10	–	19	.345
Portland	3	–	13	.188	7	–	24	.226
Santa Clara	0	–	16	.000	8	–	22	.267
† Conference tournament winner Rankings from AP poll

The 2011–12 BYU Cougars men's basketball team represented Brigham Young University in the 2011–12 college basketball season. This was head coach Dave Rose's seventh season at BYU. The Cougars, in their first season in the West Coast Conference, played their home games at the Marriott Center. They finished the season 26–9, 12–4 in WCC play to finish in third place. They lost in the semifinals of the West Coast Basketball tournament to Gonzaga. They received an at-large bid to the 2012 NCAA tournament where they defeated Iona in the First Four round before falling in the Round of 64 (then called the "Second Round") to Marquette.

== Preseason ==
The Cougars, coming off a 2010–11 season that saw them rise as high as #3 in the AP Poll and ended in the Sweet Sixteen of the NCAA Tournament, had to recover from major personnel losses. Consensus national player of the year Jimmer Fredette and all-time BYU steals leader Jackson Emery, called BYU's "best backcourt ever" by Salt Lake Tribune writer Jay Drew, both graduated. Another frequent starter, freshman swingman Kyle Collinsworth, temporarily left the team to go on a two-year LDS mission.

In addition to the departing players, assistant Dave Rice left to take the head coaching vacancy at UNLV.

The Cougars were picked to finish third in the WCC by the media.

=== Departures ===
Name	Number	Pos.	Height	Weight	Year	Hometown	Notes
Kyle Collinsworth	31	G	6'6"	210	Freshman	Provo, Utah	LDS mission (returned in 2013–14)
Jackson Emery	4	G	6'3"	190	Senior	Alpine, Utah	Graduated
Jimmer Fredette	32	G	6'2"	195	Senior	Glens Falls, New York	Graduated; selected in 2011 NBA draft
Logan Magnusson	12	F	6'6"	210	Senior	Heber City, Utah	Graduated
James Anderson	15	F	6'10"	240	Junior	Page, Arizona	Graduated early

=== Recruiting ===
Gaining size was a key for the 2011 BYU team. In addition to a returning Brandon Davies who would help inside the paint, BYU focused on three centers, two of which are return missionaries who will have their first playing time. The third center, Isaac Nielson, committed to BYU and announced he would serve a church mission before joining the school for the 2013–14 season.

College recruiting (2011)
Name	Hometown	School	Height	Weight	Commit date
Damarcus Harrison; SG	Greenwood, SC	Christ School	6 ft 5 in (1.96 m)	190 lb (86 kg)	Oct 7, 2010
Damarcus Harrison; SG	Recruit ratings: Scout: Rivals: (91)				
Isaac Nielson; C	Mission Viejo, CA	Mission Viejo	6 ft 10 in (2.08 m)	205 lb (93 kg)	Nov 10, 2010
Isaac Nielson; C	Recruit ratings: Scout: (88)				
Matt Carlino; PG	Scottsdale, AZ	UCLA	6 ft 1 in (1.85 m)	175 lb (79 kg)	Dec 17, 2010
Matt Carlino; PG	Recruit ratings: Scout: Rivals: (TR)				
Overall recruit ranking: Scout: nr Rivals: nr ESPN: nr
Note: In many cases, Scout, Rivals, 247Sports, On3, and ESPN may conflict in their listings of height and weight.; In these cases, the average was taken. ESPN grades are on a 100-point scale.; Sources: "ESPN". ESPN.; "2011 Team Ranking". Rivals.

=== 2011–12 return missionaries ===
College recruiting (2011)
Name	Hometown	School	Height	Weight	Commit date
Nate Austin; C	Highland, UT	Lone Peak	6 ft 9 in (2.06 m)	215 lb (98 kg)	May 16, 2008
Nate Austin; C	Recruit ratings: Scout: Rivals: (POST)				
Ian Harward; C	Orem, UT	Orem	6 ft 10 in (2.08 m)	215 lb (98 kg)	Aug 17, 2008
Ian Harward; C	Recruit ratings: Scout: Rivals: (POST)				
Overall recruit ranking: Scout: nr Rivals: nr ESPN: nr
Note: In many cases, Scout, Rivals, 247Sports, On3, and ESPN may conflict in their listings of height and weight.; In these cases, the average was taken. ESPN grades are on a 100-point scale.; Sources: "ESPN". ESPN.; "2011 Team Ranking". Rivals.

== 2011 media ==
The school began to hype the basketball season with basketball media days webcasts shown live on BYUtv.org Wednesday, October 12, 2011. Jarom Jordan interviewed all the players, except for Brandon Davies who chose to abstain from interviews until the regular season begins, from the Marriott Center. Common questions asked to the players were how they chose their numbers, what they expected for the upcoming season, what they thought of the new court, and the West Coast Conference. Additionally the Cougars announced that BYUtv would air a True Blue Basketball Preview special on Thursday, November 10, 2011. All Cougar games will be broadcast on the BYU Radio Sports Network with Greg Wrubell serving as the play-by-play man (unless he is away for football) and Mark Durrant providing analysis. When Wrubell is gone for football, Durrant will serve as the play-by-play man with Russ Larson serving as the analyst. Steve Cleveland will also provide analysis on the radio for select conference games. Dave McCann, Blaine Fowler, Steve Cleveland, Robbie Bullough, Jarom Jordan, and Lakia Holmes will provide coverage for BYUtv Sports throughout the season.

The Pre-season WCC poll expects the Cougars to finish 3rd behind Gonzaga and St. Mary's and just ahead of Santa Clara.

=== BYU Radio Sports Network Affiliates ===
KSL 102.7 FM and 1160 AM- Flagship Station (Salt Lake City/ Provo, UT and ksl.com)
BYU Radio- Nationwide (Dish Network 980, Sirius XM 143, and byuradio.org)
KTHK- Blackfoot/ Idaho Falls/ Pocatello/ Rexburg, ID
KMGR- Manti, UT
KSUB- Cedar City, UT
KDXU- St. George, UT

== Roster ==
2011–12 BYU Cougars men's basketball team
Players
Coaches

Pos.	#	Name	Height	Weight	Year	Previous school	Hometown
F	0	Brandon Davies	6 ft 9 in (2.06 m)	235 lb (107 kg)	Jr	Provo	Provo, UT
G/F	1	Charles Abouo (C)	6 ft 5 in (1.96 m)	215 lb (98 kg)	Sr	Brewster Academy (Wolfeboro, NH)	Abidjan, Côte d'Ivoire
G	2	Craig Cusick	6 ft 2 in (1.88 m)	185 lb (84 kg)	RS Jr	Orem; Utah	Orem, UT
G	3	Austin Nelson (redshirt)	6 ft 0 in (1.83 m)	160 lb (73 kg)	Fr	Coronado	Henderson, NV
F	5	Chris Collinsworth (injured)	6 ft 9 in (2.06 m)	235 lb (107 kg)	RS So	Provo	Provo, UT
G	10	Matt Carlino	6 ft 2 in (1.88 m)	175 lb (79 kg)	RS Fr	Bloomington South (Bloomington, IN)	Scottsdale, AZ
F	12	Josh Sharp	6 ft 7 in (2.01 m)	185 lb (84 kg)	RS Fr	Lone Peak; Utah	Highland, UT
G/F	13	Brock Zylstra (C)	6 ft 6 in (1.98 m)	210 lb (95 kg)	Jr	Bonita	La Verne, CA
G	14	Nick Martineau	6 ft 0 in (1.83 m)	170 lb (77 kg)	Jr	Davis	Fruit Heights, UT
G/F	15	Jaren Sweeney (redshirt)	6 ft 5 in (1.96 m)	190 lb (86 kg)	Fr	Mesa View	Mesa, AZ
G	20	Anson Winder	6 ft 3 in (1.91 m)	195 lb (88 kg)	RS Fr	Bishop Gorman	Las Vegas, NV
F	21	Stephen Rogers (injured)	6 ft 8 in (2.03 m)	195 lb (88 kg)	Jr	Mountain View; Mesa CC	Mesa, AZ
G	24	Damarcus Harrison	6 ft 5 in (1.96 m)	190 lb (86 kg)	Fr	Christ	Greenwood, SC
F/C	33	Nate Austin	6 ft 11 in (2.11 m)	230 lb (104 kg)	Fr	Lone Peak	Alpine, UT
F	34	Noah Hartsock (C)	6 ft 8 in (2.03 m)	230 lb (104 kg)	Sr	Bartlesville	Bartlesville, OK
F	35	Michael Boswell	6 ft 9 in (2.06 m)	215 lb (98 kg)	RS Fr	Aloha	Aloha, OR
F/C	42	Ian Harward (redshirt)	6 ft 10 in (2.08 m)	215 lb (98 kg)	Fr	Orem	Orem, UT

Head coach

- Dave Rose (Houston)

Assistant coach(es)

- Terry Nashif (BYU)
- Tim LaComb (Utah)
- Mark Pope (Kentucky)

Legend

- (C) Team captain
- (S) Suspended
- (I) Ineligible
- (W) Walk-on
- Injured
- Current redshirt

== High school prospects ==
=== 2011–12 underclassmen verbal commitments ===
College recruiting (2011)
Name	Hometown	School	Height	Weight	Commit date
Nick Emery (2013 Commit); SG	Highland, Utah	Lone Peak	6 ft 2 in (1.88 m)	170 lb (77 kg)	Aug 29, 2011
Nick Emery (2013 Commit); SG	Recruit ratings: Scout:				
T. J. Haws (2014 Commit); PG	Highland, Utah	Lone Peak	6 ft 2 in (1.88 m)	175 lb (79 kg)	Aug 29, 2011
T. J. Haws (2014 Commit); PG	Recruit ratings: No ratings found				
Erik Mika (2013 Commit); PF	Highland, Utah	Lone Peak	6 ft 8 in (2.03 m)	210 lb (95 kg)	Dec 16, 2011
Erik Mika (2013 Commit); PF	Recruit ratings: No ratings found				
Braiden Shaw (2013 Commit); PF	Eagle, Idaho	Eagle	6 ft 8 in (2.03 m)	210 lb (95 kg)	Oct 7, 2011
Braiden Shaw (2013 Commit); PF	Recruit ratings: No ratings found				
Jakob Hartsock (2013 Commit); C	Bartlesville, Oklahoma	Bartlesville	6 ft 8 in (2.03 m)	215 lb (98 kg)	Feb 23, 2012
Jakob Hartsock (2013 Commit); C	Recruit ratings: No ratings found				
Overall recruit ranking: Scout: nr Rivals: nr ESPN: nr
Note: In many cases, Scout, Rivals, 247Sports, On3, and ESPN may conflict in their listings of height and weight.; In these cases, the average was taken. ESPN grades are on a 100-point scale.; Sources: "ESPN". ESPN.; "2011 Team Ranking". Rivals.

== Schedule and results ==
Date time, TV	Rank^{#}	Opponent^{#}	Result	Record	Site city, state
Exhibition
October 29, 2011*; 7:00 p.m., BYUtv		Midwestern State	W 91–74	n/a	Marriott Center; Provo, UT
November 4, 2011*; 7:00 p.m., BYUtv		Dixie State	W 96–85	n/a	Marriott Center; Provo, UT
Regular season
November 11, 2011*; 7:00 p.m., KCSG		at Utah State; Old Oquirrh Bucket	L 62–69	0–1	Smith Spectrum (10,270); Logan, UT
November 15, 2011*; 7:00 p.m., BYUtv		BYU–Hawaiʻi	W 73–52	1–1	Marriott Center (13,435); Provo, UT
November 18, 2011*; 7:00 p.m., BYUtv		Longwood; Chicago Invitational Challenge	W 92–60	2–1	Marriott Center (10,173); Provo, UT
November 22, 2011*; 7:00 p.m., BYUtv		Prairie View A&M; Chicago Invitational Challenge	W 90–51	3–1	Marriott Center (11,760); Provo, UT
November 25, 2011*; 4:00 p.m., BYUtv		vs. Nevada; Chicago Invitational Challenge Semifinals	W 76–55	4–1	Sears Centre; Chicago, IL
November 26, 2011*; 6:00 p.m., BTN		vs. No. 11 Wisconsin; Chicago Invitational Challenge Championship	L 56–73	4–2	Sears Centre (2,634); Chicago, IL
November 30, 2011*; 7:00 p.m., BYUtv		vs. Northern Arizona; Lumberjack Classic	W 87–52	5–2	Tim's Toyota Center (3,215); Prescott Valley, AZ
December 3, 2011*; 3:00 p.m., ESPNU		vs. Oregon	W 79–65	6–2	EnergySolutions Arena (12,845); Salt Lake City, UT
December 7, 2011*; 7:00 p.m., BYUtv		Weber State; Old Oquirrh Bucket	W 94–66	7–2	Marriott Center (11,676); Provo, UT
December 10, 2011*; 12:00 p.m., FSN		at Utah; Old Oquirrh Bucket	W 61–42	8–2	Huntsman Center (10,327); Salt Lake City, UT
December 17, 2011*; 12:00 p.m., BYUtv		No. 6 Baylor	L 83–86	8–3	Marriott Center (22,700); Provo, UT
December 20, 2011*; 7:00 p.m., BYUtv		Buffalo	W 93–78	9–3	Marriott Center; Provo, UT
December 22, 2011*; 7:00 p.m., BYUtv		UC Santa Barbara	W 89–75	10–3	Marriott Center (10,670); Provo, UT
December 27, 2011*; 7:00 p.m., BYUtv		Cal State-San Marcos	W 79–51	11–3	Marriott Center (13,007); Provo, UT
December 29, 2011; 9:00 p.m., ESPN2		at Saint Mary's	L 82–98	11–4 (0–1)	McKeon Pavilion (3,500); Moraga, CA
December 31, 2011; 4:00 p.m., BYUtv		San Diego	W 88–52	12–4 (1–1)	Marriott Center (16,369); Provo, UT
January 5, 2012; 7:00 p.m., BYUtv		at Loyola Marymount	W 73–65	13–4 (2–1)	Gersten Pavilion (3,073); Los Angeles, CA
January 7, 2012; 4:00 p.m., BYUtv		San Francisco	W 81–56	14–4 (3–1)	Marriott Center (14,823); Provo, UT
January 14, 2012; 6:00 p.m., ESPNU		Santa Clara	W 95–78	15–4 (4–1)	Marriott Center (16,116); Provo, UT
January 16, 2012; 8:00 p.m., BYUtv		at San Diego	W 82–63	16–4 (5–1)	Jenny Craig Pavilion (3,204); San Diego, CA
January 19, 2012; 6:30 p.m., BYUtv		Loyola Marymount	L 68–82	16–5 (5–2)	Marriott Center (12,751); Provo, UT
January 21, 2012; 6:00 p.m., BYUtv		at Pepperdine	W 77–64	17–5 (6–2)	Firestone Fieldhouse (3,104); Malibu, CA
January 25, 2012*; 5:00 p.m., ESPN3		at Virginia Tech	W 70–68	18–5	Cassell Coliseum (9,231); Blacksburg, VA
January 28, 2012; 7:00 p.m., ESPNU		No. 21 Saint Mary's	L 66–80	18–6 (6–3)	Marriott Center (22,700); Provo, UT
February 2, 2012; 9:00 p.m., ESPN2		No. 24 Gonzaga	W 83–73	19–6 (7–3)	Marriott Center (19,257); Provo, UT
February 4, 2012; 8:00 p.m., BYUtv		at Portland	W 79–60	20–6 (8–3)	Chiles Center (4,159); Portland, OR
February 11, 2012; 4:00 p.m., BYUtv		Pepperdine	W 86–48	21–6 (9–3)	Marriott Center (19,008); Provo, UT
February 16, 2012; 8:00 p.m., ESPNU		at San Francisco	W 85–84	22–6 (10–3)	War Memorial Gymnasium (2,875); San Francisco, CA
February 18, 2012; 5:00 p.m., ESPNU		at Santa Clara	W 82–67	23–6 (11–3)	Leavey Center (4,700); Santa Clara, CA
February 23, 2012; 9:00 p.m., ESPN2		at Gonzaga	L 63–74	23–7 (11–4)	McCarthey Athletic Center (6,000); Spokane, WA
February 25, 2012; 4:00 p.m., BYUtv		Portland	W 76–66	24–7 (12–4)	Marriott Center (22,700); Provo, UT
WCC tournament
March 2, 2012; 9:30 p.m., ESPNU	(3)	vs. (6) San Diego; Quarterfinals	W 73–68	25–7	Orleans Arena (5,037); Las Vegas, NV
March 3, 2012; 10:00 p.m., ESPN2	(3)	vs. (2) Gonzaga; Semifinals	L 58–77	25–8	Orleans Arena (7,828); Las Vegas, NV
NCAA tournament
March 13, 2012*; 7:45 p.m., truTV	(14 W)	vs. (14 W) Iona; First Four	W 78–72	26–8	University of Dayton Arena; Dayton, OH
March 15, 2012*; 12:53 p.m., CBS	(14 W)	vs. (3 W) No. 11 Marquette; Second Round	L 68–88	26–9	KFC Yum! Center (16,069); Louisville, KY
*Non-conference game. ^{#}Rankings from AP Poll. (#) Tournament seedings in parentheses.

On March 13, 2012, BYU set a record for the largest comeback in an NCAA tournament game, as they were down by 25 points at one point in their first match of the 2012 NCAA Division I men's basketball tournament and came back to beat the Iona Gaels 78–72.

== Game summaries ==
=== Cougar tipoff ===
Broadcasters: Jarom Jordan and Steve Cleveland

BYUtv.org

Oct 26
7:00 pm

Recap

BYU Blue 74, BYU White 71
Scoring by half: 32–22, 42–49
Pts: Noah Hartsock 24; Rebs: Noah Hartsock 13; Asts: Matt Carlino 5	Pts: Stephen Rogers 20; Rebs: Anson Winder 5 Asts: Brock Zylstra 6

Marriott Center
Provo, UT
Attendance: N/A

=== Exhibition: Midwestern State ===
Broadcasters: Dave McCann, Steve Cleveland, and Robbie Bullough

BYUtv

Oct 29
7:00 pm

Recap

Midwestern State Broncos 74, BYU Cougars 91
Scoring by half: 36–50, 38–41
Pts: DeJuan Plummer 16; Rebs: David Terrell 7 Asts: 3 tied with 4	Pts: Stephen Rogers 16; Rebs: Brandon Davies 9 Asts: Brock Zylstra 5

Marriott Center
Provo, UT
Attendance: N/A
Referees: Glen Mayberry, Casey McClellan, Daryl Gelinas

=== Exhibition: Dixie State ===
Broadcasters: Dave McCann, Steve Cleveland, and Robbie Bullough

BYUtv

Nov 4
7:00 pm

Recap

Dixie State Red Storm 85, BYU Cougars 96
Scoring by half: 35–41, 50–55
Pts: Griffon Jones 26; Rebs: McKay Massey 5 Asts: Maurice Cole 10	Pts: Brock Zylstra 23; Rebs: Noah Hartsock 12; Asts: 2 tied with 3

Marriott Center
Provo, UT
Attendance: N/A
Referees: Michael Greenstein, Tony Padilla, Klaus Endrissat

=== At Utah State ===
BYU leads series 136-91
Broadcasters: Mychal Clanton and Brooks Hansen

KCSG/ESPN3

Nov 11
7:00 pm

Recap

BYU Cougars 62, Utah State Aggies 69
Scoring by half: 28–30, 34–39
Pts: Noah Hartsock 18; Rebs: Charles Abouo 6 Asts: Noah Hartsock 4	Pts: Brockeith Pane 21; Rebs: 2 tied with 8 Asts: 2 tied with 5

Dee Glen Smith Spectrum
Logan, UT
Attendance: 10,270
Referees: Bobby McRoy, Mike Eggers, Sam Haddad

=== BYU-Hawaiʻi ===
First series meeting
Broadcasters: Jarom Jordan and Steve Cleveland

BYUtv

Nov 15
7:00 pm

Recap

#5 (D2) BYU-Hawaiʻi Seasiders 52, BYU Cougars 73
Scoring by half: 17–40, 35–33
Pts: 2 tied with 12; Rebs: Bracken Funk 8 Asts: 2 tied with 3	Pts: Brandon Davies 25; Rebs: 2 tied with 9 Asts: Noah Hartsock 5

Marriott Center
Provo, UT
Attendance: 13,435
Referees: Glen Mayberry, James Giron, Casey McClellan

=== Longwood ===
First series meeting
Broadcasters: Dave McCann and Steve Cleveland

BYUtv

Nov 18
7:00 pm

Recap

Longwood Lancers 60, BYU Cougars 92
Scoring by half: 29–35, 31–57
Pts: Antwan Carter 18; Rebs: 3 tied with 4 Asts: Martiz Washington 4	Pts: Charles Abouo 19; Rebs: Charles Abouo 16; Asts: Anson Winder 5

Marriott Center
Provo, UT
Attendance: 10,173
Referees: Daryl Gelinas, Mark Cook, Jeffrey Kent

=== Prairie View A&M ===
First series meeting
Broadcasters: Dave McCann, Blaine Fowler, and Robbie Bullough

BYUtv

Nov 22
7:00 pm

Recap

Prairie View A&M Panthers 51, BYU Cougars 90
Scoring by half: 25–34, 26–56
Pts: Jourdan Demuynck 11; Rebs: Jourdan Demuynck 8 Asts: 3 tied with 2	Pts: Stephen Rogers 18; Rebs: Brandon Davies 8 Asts: Anson Winder 4

Marriott Center
Provo, UT
Attendance: 11,760
Referees: Michael Eggers, Jeff Ketchu, Coban Lopez

=== Vs. Nevada ===
BYU leads series 12-6
Broadcasters: Dave McCann and Steve Cleveland

BYUtv

Nov 25
4:00 pm

Recap

Nevada Wolf Pack 55, BYU Cougars 76
Scoring by half: 27–34, 28–42
Pts: 3 tied with 11; Rebs: Olek Czyz 9 Asts: Deonte Burton 8	Pts: Charles Abouo 22; Rebs: Charles Abouo 8 Asts: 2 tied with 4

Sears Centre
Chicago, IL
Attendance: N/A
Referees: Tim Kelly, Tony Dawkins, Ron Tyburski

=== Vs. Wisconsin ===
Wisconsin leads series 1-0
Broadcasters: Brian Anderson and Eddie Johnson

BTN

Nov 26
6:00 pm

Recap

#11 Wisconsin Badgers 73, BYU Cougars 56
Scoring by half: 34–32, 39–24
Pts: Ben Brust 21; Rebs: Mike Bruesewitz 6 Asts: Jordan Taylor 8	Pts: Noah Hartsock 18; Rebs: Noah Hartsock 6 Asts: Craig Cusick 4

Sears Centre
Chicago, IL
Attendance: 2,634
Referees: Bill Covington, Tony Dawkins, Bob Testa

=== Vs. Northern Arizona ===
Northern Arizona leads series 1-0
Broadcasters: Dave McCann and Steve Cleveland

BYUtv

Nov 30
7:00 pm

Recap

BYU Cougars 87, Northern Arizona Lumberjacks 52
Scoring by half: 44–21, 43–31
Pts: Brock Zylstra 23; Rebs: Brandon Davies 9 Asts: Anson Winder 9	Pts: Colin Gruber 13; Rebs: Durrell Norman 6 Asts: Stallon Saldivar 6

Tim's Toyota Center
Prescott Valley, AZ
Attendance: 3,215
Referees: Scott Twardoski, Chris Rastatter, Gregory Nixon

=== Vs. Oregon ===
Oregon leads series 12-8
Broadcasters: Roxy Bernstein and Miles Simon

ESPNU

Dec 3
3:00 pm

Recap

Oregon Ducks 65, BYU Cougars 79
Scoring by half: 31–38, 34–41
Pts: Garrett Sim 16; Rebs: Olu Ashaolu 9 Asts: Garret Sim 7	Pts: Noah Hartsock 23; Rebs: 2 tied with 12; Asts: Anson Winder 6

EnergySolutions Arena
Salt Lake City, UT
Attendance: 12,845
Referees: Kevin Brill, Gregory Nixon, JP Orr

=== Weber State ===
BYU leads series 26-10
Broadcasters: Dave McCann, Blaine Fowler, and Lakia Holmes

BYUtv

Dec 7
7:00 pm

Recap

Weber State Wildcats 66, BYU Cougars 94
Scoring by half: 34–47, 32–47
Pts: Damian Lillard 15; Rebs: Damian Lillard 10; Asts: Frank Otis 3	Pts: Noah Hartsock 19; Rebs: Noah Hartsock 12; Asts: Craig Cusick 8

Marriott Center
Provo, UT
Attendance: 11,676
Referees: Eric Curry, Jon Stigliano, Scott Brown

=== At Utah ===
BYU leads series 127-125
Broadcasters: Barry Tompkins and Reggie Theus

FSN

Dec 10
12:00 pm

Recap

BYU Cougars 61, Utah Utes 42
Scoring by half: 25–17, 36–25
Pts: Noah Hartsock 19; Rebs: Brandon Davies 9 Asts: Craig Cusick 6	Pts: Josh Watkins 14; Rebs: Dijon Farr 7 Asts: Josh Watkins 5

Huntsman Center
Salt Lake City, UT
Attendance: 10,327
Referees: Deron White, Bobby McRoy, Glen Mayberry

=== Baylor ===
BYU leads series 5-2
Broadcasters: Dave McCann, Blaine Fowler, and Robbie Bullough (Steve Cleveland Halftime and Postgame)

BYUtv

Dec 17
12:00 pm

Recap

#6 Baylor Bears 86, BYU Cougars 83
Scoring by half: 38–42, 48–41
Pts: Perry Jones III 28; Rebs: Perry Jones III 8 Asts: Pierre Jackson 7	Pts: 2 tied with 18; Rebs: Brandon Davies 13; Asts: Craig Cusick 4

Marriott Center
Provo, UT
Attendance: 22,700
Referees: Rick Crawford, Keith Kimble, Joe DeRosa

=== Buffalo ===
BYU leads series 1-0
Broadcasters: Dave McCann, Blaine Fowler, and Robbie Bullough

BYUtv

Dec 20
7:00 pm

Recap

Buffalo Bulls 78, BYU Cougars 93
Scoring by half: 39–47, 39–46
Pts: Mitchell Watt 18; Rebs: Mitchell Watt 8 Asts: Jarod Oldham 9	Pts: Brock Zylstra 26; Rebs: Matt Carlino 7 Asts: Matt Carlino 11

Marriott Center
Provo, UT
Attendance: 9,632
Referees: Ken Ditty, Tom Nally, Jeffrey Kent

=== UC Santa Barbara ===
First series meeting
Broadcasters: Dave McCann, Blaine Fowler, and Robbie Bullough

BYUtv

Dec 22
7:00 pm

Recap

UC Santa Barbara Gauchos 75, BYU Cougars 89
Scoring by half: 32–38, 43–51
Pts: 2 tied with 22; Rebs: Orlando Johnson 9 Asts: Kyle Boswell 4	Pts: Matt Carlino 22; Rebs: Brock Zylstra 7 Asts: Matt Carlino 6

Marriott Center
Provo, UT
Attendance: 10,670
Referees: Ken Ditty, Tom Nally, Jeffrey Kent

=== Cal State- San Marcos ===
First series meeting
Broadcasters: Dave McCann, Steve Cleveland, and Robbie Bullough

BYUtv

Dec 27
7:00 pm

Recap

Cal State-San Marcos Cougars 51, BYU Cougars 79
Scoring by half: 23–32, 28–47
Pts: Tim Steed 11; Rebs: Jamel McGuire 8 Asts: Daniel Redmond 6	Pts: Noah Hartsock 20; Rebs: Brandon Davies 13; Asts: Charles Abouo 4

Marriott Center
Provo, UT
Attendance: 13,007
Referees: Mike Reed, Michael Eggers, Gregory Nixon

=== At Saint Mary's ===
BYU leads series 8-2
Broadcasters: Dave Flemming and Sean Farnham

ESPN2

Dec 29
9:00 pm

Recap

BYU Cougars 82, Saint Mary's Gaels 98
Scoring by half: 43–53, 39–45
Pts: Brandon Davies 28; Rebs: Brandon Davies 7 Asts: Matt Carlino 6	Pts: Rob Jones 24; Rebs: Rob Jones 15; Asts: Matthew Dellavedova 12

McKeon Pavilion
Moraga, CA
Attendance: 3,500
Referees: Tom Wood, Ken Ditty, Deron White

=== San Diego ===
BYU leads series 2-0
Broadcasters: Jarom Jordan, Blaine Fowler, and Robbie Bullough

BYUtv, 4SD

Dec 31
4:00 pm

Recap

San Diego Toreros 54, BYU Cougars 88
Scoring by half: 24-34, 30-54
Pts: Ken Rancifer 12; Rebs: Ken Rancifer 8 Asts: Christopher Anderson 4	Pts: Brandon Davies 21; Rebs: Brandon Davies 22; Asts: Anson Winder 5

Marriott Center
Provo, UT
Attendance: 16,369
Referees: Donald Scott Harris, Bruce Hicks, Dennis Flannery Jr.

=== At Loyola Marymount ===
Loyola Marymount leads series 2-1
Broadcasters: Dave McCann and Blaine Fowler

BYUtv, Prime Ticket

Jan 5
7:00 pm

Recap

BYU Cougars 73, Loyola Marymount Lions 65
Scoring by half: 34-34, 39-31
Pts: Noah Hartsock 21; Rebs: Brandon Davies 10; Asts: Matt Carlino 7	Pts: Anthony Ireland 21; Rebs: Alex Osborne 11; Asts: Anthony Ireland 7

Gersten Pavilion
Los Angeles, CA
Attendance: 3,073
Referees: Jimmy Casas, Casey McClellan, Dildre Carr

=== San Francisco ===
Series tied 5-5
Broadcasters: Dave McCann, Blaine Fowler, and Robbie Bullough (Steve Cleveland Halftime and Postgame Show)

BYUtv

Jan 7
4:00 pm

Recap

San Francisco Dons 56, BYU Cougars 81
Scoring by half: 20-42, 36-29
Pts: Michael Williams 10; Rebs: Perris Blackwell 10; Asts: Avery Johnson 3	Pts: Brock Zylstra 22; Rebs: Nate Austin 9 Asts: Charles Abouo 7

Marriott Center
Provo, UT
Attendance: 14,823
Referees: Tom Wood, Brett Nansel, Horace Shields

=== Santa Clara ===
BYU leads series 15-5
Broadcasters: Dave Flemming and Sean Farnham

ESPNU

Jan 14
6:00 pm

Recap

Santa Clara Broncos 78, BYU Cougars 95
Scoring by half: 42-45, 36-50
Pts: Kevin Foster 22; Rebs: Yannick Atanga 5 Asts: Kevin Foster 5	Pts: Brandon Davies 23; Rebs: Nate Austin 7 Asts: Matt Carlino 8; 3 Cougars scored 20+ points

Marriott Center
Provo, UT
Attendance: 16,116
Referees: Rick Batsell, Randy Burkhart, Mike Peterson

=== At San Diego ===
BYU leads series 3-0
Broadcasters: Steve Quis and Jim Brogan (Blaine Fowler and Steve Cleveland Halftime)

BYUtv, 4SD

Jan 16
8:00 pm

Recap

BYU Cougars 82, San Diego Toreros 63
Scoring by half: 37-29, 45-34
Pts: Brock Zylstra 17; Rebs: Brandon Davies 12; Asts: Charles Abouo 7	Pts: Dennis Kramer 15; Rebs: Dennis Kramer 8 Asts: 3 tied with 3

Jenny Craig Pavilion/ The Slim Gym
San Diego, CA
Attendance: 3,204
Referees: Dick Cartmell, Mike Reed, Tony Padilla

=== Loyola Marymount ===
Series even 2-2
Broadcasters: Dave McCann, Blaine Fowler, and Robbie Bullough

BYUtv, Prime Ticket

Jan 19
6:30 pm

Recap

Loyola Marymount Lions 82, BYU Cougars 68
Scoring by half: 34-28, 48-40
Pts: Anthony Ireland 27; Rebs: Ashley Hamilton 7 Asts: Anthony Ireland 5	Pts: Noah Hartsock 28; Rebs: Brandon Davies 9 Asts: Craig Cusick 4

Marriott Center
Provo, UT
Attendance: 12,751
Referees: Glen Mayberry, Marc A. Beasley, Daryl Gelinas

=== At Pepperdine ===
Series even 4-4
Broadcasters: Dave McCann and Steve Cleveland (Jamie Zaninovich Halftime)

BYUtv, FS West

Jan 21
6:00 pm

Recap

BYU Cougars 77, Pepperdine Waves 64
Scoring by half: 42-29, 35-35
Pts: Brandon Davies 29 (career high); Rebs: Charles Abouo 9 Asts: 2 tied with 4 Noah Hartsock joins 1000 pnt club	Pts: Taylor Darby 21; Rebs: Taylor Darby 8 Asts: Jordan Baker 7

Firestone Fieldhouse
Malibu, CA
Attendance: 3,104
Referees: Klaus Endrissat, Dennis Flannery, Deldre Carr

=== At Virginia Tech ===
BYU leads series 1-0
Broadcasters: Walter Storhlot and Steven Binder

ESPN3

Jan 25
5:00 pm

Recap

BYU Cougars 70, Virginia Tech Hokies 68
Scoring by half: 29-25, 41-43
Pts: Noah Hartsock 22; Rebs: Charles Abouo 8 Asts: Matt Carlino 5; 1st ever win for BYU in ACC Country	Pts: Dorenzo Hudson 14; Rebs: Jarell Eddie 14; Asts: 2 tied with 5

Cassell Coliseum
Blacksburg, VA
Attendance: 9,231
Referees: Mike Eades, Bernard Clinton, Raymond Styons

=== Saint Mary's ===
BYU leads series 8-3
Broadcasters: Dave Flemming and Sean Farnham (Jarom Jordan, Steve Cleveland, and Robbie Bullough Postgame)

ESPNU

Jan 28
7:00 pm

Recap

#21 Saint Mary's Gaels 80, BYU Cougars 66
Scoring by half: 40-28, 40-38
Pts: Brad Waldow 19; Rebs: Rob Jones 9 Asts: Stephen Holt 5	Pts: 2 tied with 15; Rebs: Brandon Davies 7 Asts: 2 tied with 3

Marriott Center
Provo, UT
Attendance: 22,700
Referees: Frank Harvey, James Giron, Glen Mayberry

=== Gonzaga ===
Series even 1-1
Broadcasters: Dave Flemming and Sean Farnham (Blaine Fowler, Steve Cleveland, and Robbie Bullough Postgame)

ESPN2

Feb 2
9:00 pm

Recap

#24 Gonzaga Bulldogs 73, BYU Cougars 83
Scoring by half: 24-38, 49-45
Pts: Sam Dower 15; Rebs: Elias Harris 6 Asts: David Stockton 5	Pts: Noah Hartsock 24; Rebs: Noah Hartsock 14; Asts: 2 tied with 5

Marriott Center
Provo, UT
Attendance: 19,257
Referees: Dick Cartmell, Rick Batsell, Jimmy Casas

=== At Portland ===
BYU leads series 4-1
Broadcasters: Dave McCann and Steve Cleveland

BYUtv

Feb 4
8:00 pm

Recap

BYU Cougars 79, Portland Pilots 60
Scoring by half: 37-32, 42-28
Pts: Brandon Davies 18; Rebs: Brandon Davies 13; Asts: 2 tied with 4	Pts: Kevin Bailey 15; Rebs: Ryan Nicholas 11; Asts: Derrick Rodgers 4

Chiles Center
Portland, OR
Attendance: 4,159
Referees: Horace Shields, Scott Harris, Michael Greenstein

=== Pepperdine ===
BYU leads series 5-4
Broadcasters: Dave McCann, Steve Cleveland, and Robbie Bullough

BYUtv, FS West

Feb 11
4:00 pm

Recap

Pepperdine Waves 48, BYU Cougars 86
Scoring by half: 25-46, 23-40
Pts: 2 tied with 8 Rebs: Jordan Baker 7 Asts: 2 tied with 3	Pts: Charles Abouo 23; Rebs: Charles Abouo 12; Asts: Matt Carlino 6

Marriott Center
Provo, UT
Attendance: 19,008
Referees: Tom Wood, Bobby McRoy, Michael Rapp

=== At San Francisco ===
BYU leads series 6-5
Broadcasters: Mark Neely and Miles Simon

ESPNU

Feb 16
8:00 pm

Recap

BYU Cougars 85, San Francisco Dons 84
Scoring by half: 49-44, 36-40
Pts: Matt Carlino 30 (career high); Rebs: 2 tied with 6 Asts: Charles Abouo 4	Pts: Angelo Calioaro 23; Rebs: Perris Blackwell 11; Asts: Cody Doolin 7

War Memorial Gymnasium/ The Hilltop
San Francisco, CA
Attendance: 2,875
Referees: Dick Cartmell, Tony Padilla, Deron White

=== At Santa Clara ===
BYU leads series 16-5
Broadcasters: Mark Neely and Miles Simon

ESPNU

Feb 18
5:00 pm

Recap

BYU Cougars 82, Santa Clara Broncos 67
Scoring by half: 34-31, 48-36
Pts: Noah Hartsock 21; Rebs: Charles Abouo 8 Asts: 2 tied with 5	Pts: 2 tied with 19; Rebs: Niyi Harrison 6 Asts: Evan Roquemore 7

Leavey Center
Santa Clara, CA
Attendance: 4,700
Referees: Brett Nansel, Donald Harris, Marc Beasley

=== At Gonzaga ===
BYU leads series 2-1
Broadcasters: Brent Musburger and Sean Farnham

ESPN2

Feb 23
9:00 pm

Recap

BYU Cougars 63, Gonzaga Bulldogs 74
Scoring by half: 27-37, 36-37
Pts: Brandon Davies 23; Rebs: 3 tied with 10; Asts: Matt Carlino 3	Pts: Elias Harris 19; Rebs: Elias Harris 16; Asts: Kevin Pangos 3

McCarthey Athletic Center/ The Kennel
Spokane, WA
Attendance: 6,000
Referees: Mike Reed, Frank Harvey, Michael Greenstein

=== Portland ===
BYU leads series 5-1
Broadcasters: Dave McCann, Steve Cleveland, and Robbie Bullough

BYUtv

Feb 25
4:00 pm

Recap

Portland Pilots 66, BYU Cougars 76
Scoring by half: 29-42, 37-34
Pts: Ryan Nicholas 19; Rebs: Ryan Nicholas 14; Asts: Tim Douglas 4	Pts: Brandon Davies 25; Rebs: Brock Zylstra 9 Asts: Matt Carlino 8

Marriott Center
Provo, UT
Attendance: 22,700
Referees: Tom Wood, Mike Peterson, Milt Stowe

=== WCC Tournament: vs. San Diego ===
BYU leads series 4-0
Broadcasters: Dave Flemming and Sean Farnham

ESPNU

Mar 2
8:30 pm

Recap

BYU Cougars 73, San Diego Toreros 68
Scoring by half: 34-34, 39-34
Pts: Noah Hartsock 19; Rebs: Charles Abouo 7 Asts: Matt Carlino 7	Pts: Dennis Kramer 17; Rebs: Dennis Kramer 9 Asts: Christopher Anderson 6

Orleans Arena
Las Vegas, NV
Attendance: 5,037
Referees: Scott Harris, Sam Haddad, Mike Peterson

=== WCC Tournament: vs. Gonzaga ===
Series even 2-2
Broadcasters: Dave Flemming and Sean Farnham

ESPN2

Mar 3
10:00 pm

Recap

Gonzaga Bulldogs 77, BYU Cougars 58
Scoring by half: 38-26, 39-32
Pts: Kevin Pangos 30; Rebs: Elias Harris 15; Asts: 2 tied with 4	Pts: Brandon Davies 17; Rebs: Charles Abouo 10; Asts: Matt Carlino 4

Orleans Arena
Las Vegas, NV
Attendance: 7,828
Referees: Ken Ditty, Gregory Nixon, Michael Eggers

=== NCAA Tournament First Four: vs. Iona ===
First series meeting
Broadcasters: Jim Nantz, Clark Kellogg, Steve Kerr, and Tracy Wolfson

truTV

Mar 13
7:45 pm

Recap

Iona Gaels 72, BYU Cougars 78
Scoring by half: 55-40, 17-38
Pts: Scott Machado 15; Rebs: Mike Glover 9 Asts: Scott Machado 10	Pts: Noah Hartsock 23; Rebs: Brandon Davies 15; Asts: Craig Cusick 8; 25 pnt comeback largest comeback in NCAA Tourney History

University of Dayton Arena
Dayton, OH
Attendance: 8,510
Referees: John Higgins, Mike Kitts, Sean Corbin

=== NCAA Tournament 2nd Round: vs. Marquette ===
Series even 2-2
Broadcasters: Verne Lundquist, Bill Raftery, and Lesley Visser

CBS

Mar 15
12:53 pm

Recap

BYU Cougars 68, #11 Marquette Golden Eagles 88
Scoring by half: 34-49, 34-39
Pts: Brandon Davies 19; Rebs: Brandon Davies 11; Asts: Matt Carlino 4	Pts: Jae Crowder 25; Rebs: Jae Crowder 16; Asts: Junior Cadouugan 5

KFC Yum! Arena
Louisville, KY
Attendance: 16,069
Referees: Jamie Luckie, Craig Boroski, Raymond Perone

== Rankings ==
Ranking movements Legend: ██ Increase in ranking ██ Decrease in ranking — = Not ranked RV = Received votes
	Week																			
Poll	Pre	1	2	3	4	5	6	7	8	9	10	11	12	13	14	15	16	17	18	Final
AP	—	—	—	—	—	—	—	—	—	—	—	—	—	RV	RV	RV	RV	—	—	Not released
Coaches	RV	RV	—	—	—	—	—	RV	—	—	RV	—	—	—	—	—	—	—	—	—

*AP does not release post-NCAA Tournament rankings.
