= Old Oquirrh Bucket =

College basketball award in Utah

The Old Oquirrh Bucket (named after the Oquirrh Mountains to the west of Salt Lake City, as well as the famous Old Oaken Bucket) is the symbol of in-state basketball supremacy in Utah, United States. Every year from 1974 to 2010, the trophy was awarded to the in-state college team (University of Utah (U of U), Brigham Young University (BYU), Utah State University (USU), Weber State University (WSU), Utah Valley University (UVU), and Southern Utah University (SUU)) that had the best win–loss record against in-state competition.

In 1974, a proposal was presented to create a trophy—a symbol to be awarded annually to Utah's best college basketball team. The concept was accepted and for the first two years the in-state title was awarded to the USU Aggies, although no actual trophy had been determined.

In 1977, after Weber State won the title for the first time, an Ogden businessman located a pioneer bucket at a local auction, complete with a history of how it had been found. It became the traveling trophy emblematic of Utah college basketball supremacy.

The plaque on the bucket includes a map with the names and locations of the four original schools (BYU, U of U, USU, and WSU or WSC for Weber State College). SUU and UVU did not field Division I basketball programs at the time the trophy was created, but have since become members of the NCAA Division I. The plaque includes the caption "The Oquirrh Bucket Utah State Collegiate Champ Basketball".

Utah (U of U) has won the bucket 14 times, followed by Utah State (USU) and Brigham Young (BYU) with nine victories each, and Weber State (WSU) with four. Neither of the other two schools have ever won the award. On November 15, 2010, it was announced that the trophy would be retired, due to the recent changes in conference alignments (Utah leaving the Mountain West for the Pac-12, BYU leaving the Mountain West for the West Coast Conference) and changes in scheduling of games among the in-state schools. The Old Oquirrh Bucket was last won by Utah State in both 2008–09 and 2009–10, and will be donated by Utah State University to the Utah Sports Hall of Fame.

== Oquirrh Bucket history ==
Season	Victor	Record	Coach
2009–2010	Utah State	5–1	Stew Morrill
2008–2009	Utah State	4–1	Stew Morrill
2007–2008	BYU	4–0	Dave Rose
2006–2007	BYU	5–0	Dave Rose
2005–2006	Utah	4–1	Ray Giacoletti
2004–2005	Utah State	4–0	Stew Morrill
2003–2004	Utah	4–1	Rick Majerus
2002–2003	Utah	4–1	Rick Majerus
2001–2002	Utah State	2–1	Stew Morrill
2000–2001	BYU	4–1	Steve Cleveland
1999–2000	Weber State		Joe Cravens
1998–1999	Utah	3–1	Rick Majerus
1997–1998	Utah	5–0	Rick Majerus
1996–1997	Utah	5–0	Rick Majerus
1995–1996	Utah	4–0	Rick Majerus
1994–1995	Utah	3–1	Rick Majerus
1993–1994	BYU	4–0	Roger Reid
1992–1993	Weber State		Ron Abegglen

Season	Victor	Record	Coach
1991–1992	BYU	5–0	Roger Reid
1990–1991	Utah	5–0	Rick Majerus
1989–1990	Utah	3–2	Rick Majerus
1988–1989	Utah	4–1	Lynn Archibald
1987–1988	Utah	3–2	Lynn Archibald
1986–1987	BYU	4–1	LaDell Andersen
1985–1986	Weber State		Larry Farmer
1984–1985	Utah State	5–1	Rod Tueller
1983–1984	Utah State	5–1	Rod Tueller
1982–1983	Utah State	5–1	Rod Tueller
1981–1982	BYU	3–2	Frank Arnold
1980–1981	Utah	4–1	Jerry Pimm
1979–1980	BYU	4–0	Frank Arnold
1978–1979	BYU	3–1	Frank Arnold
1977–1978	Utah	4–2	Jerry Pimm
1976–1977	Weber State		Neil McCarthy
1975–1976	Utah State	4–2	Dutch Belnap
1974–1975	Utah State	4–2	Dutch Belnap
