= 1979–80 BYU Cougars men's basketball team =

American college basketball season

1979–80 BYU Cougars men's basketball

WAC champion

NCAA Tournament, First round
- Conference: Western Athletic Conference

Ranking
- Coaches: No. 12
- AP: No. 12
- Record: 24–5 (13–1 WAC)
- Head coach: Frank Arnold
- Assistant coaches: Roger Reid; Harry Anderson
- Home arena: Marriott Center

1979–80 WAC men's basketball standings
	Conf.				Overall
Team	W		L	PCT	W		L	PCT
No. 12 BYU	13	–	1	.929	24	–	5	.828
UTEP	10	–	4	.714	20	–	8	.714
Utah	10	–	4	.714	18	–	10	.643
Wyoming	5	–	9	.357	18	–	10	.643
Colorado State	5	–	9	.357	10	–	17	.370
Hawaii	4	–	10	.286	13	–	14	.481
New Mexico	3	–	11	.214	7	–	21	.250
San Diego State	3	–	11	.214	6	–	21	.222
Rankings from AP Poll

The 1979–80 BYU Cougars men's basketball team represented Brigham Young University in the 1979–80 college basketball season. This was head coach Frank Arnold's 5th season at BYU. The Cougars finished the regular season with a record of 24–5, 13–1 in the Western Athletic Conference. The team's sole conference loss was by a 56–53 score against Wyoming.

Junior Guard Danny Ainge was leading scorer, averaging 19.1 points per game. Center Alan Taylor with 12.5 rebounds per game.

== Roster ==
1979–80 BYU Cougars men's basketball team
Players
Coaches

Pos.	#	Name	Height	Weight	Year	Hometown
G	22	Danny Ainge	6 ft 5 in (1.96 m)	190 lb (86 kg)	Jr	Eugene, Oregon
F	34	Fred Roberts	6 ft 10 in (2.08 m)	220 lb (100 kg)	So	Riverton, Utah
F	35	Devin Durrant	6 ft 7 in (2.01 m)	195 lb (88 kg)	So	Provo, Utah
C	50	Greg Kite	6 ft 11 in (2.11 m)	245 lb (111 kg)	Fr	Houston, TX

Head coach

- Frank Arnold

Assistant coach(es)

- Roger Reid

Legend

- (C) Team captain
- (S) Suspended
- (I) Ineligible
- (W) Walk-on
- Injured
- Current redshirt

Roster

== Schedule ==
Date time, TV	Rank^{#}	Opponent^{#}	Result	Record	Site city, state
Regular Season
November 30*		Illinois	L 76–86	0–1	Marriott Center; Provo, Utah
December 1*		Baylor	W 100–58	1–1	Marriott Center; Provo, Utah
December 7*		at Tulsa	W 73–71	2–1	Tulsa Convention Center; Tulsa, Oklahoma
December 8*		at Oral Roberts	W 76–75	3–1	Mabee Center; Tulsa, Oklahoma
December 11*		Cal State Fullerton	W 80–64	4–1	Marriott Center; Provo, Utah
December 14*		UC-Santa Barbara	W 87–65	5–1	Marriott Center; Provo, Utah
December 15*		La Salle	W 108–106	6–1	Marriott Center; Provo, Utah
December 18*		at Long Beach State	L 76–78	6–2	Long Beach Arena; Long Beach, California
December 22*		at Utah State	W 89–84	7–2	Dee Glen Smith Spectrum; Logan, Utah
December 26*		vs. Penn State	W 58–50	8–2	Memorial Coliseum; Portland, OR
December 27*		vs. Oregon State	L 71–86	8–3	Memorial Coliseum; Portland, OR
December 28*		vs. Charlotte	W 104–91	9–3	Memorial Coliseum; Portland, OR
January 3		at New Mexico	W 75–63	10–3 (1–0)	The Pit/Bob King Court; Albuquerque, New Mexico
January 5		at UTEP	W 70–69	11–3 (2–0)	Special Events Center; El Paso, Texas
January 12		Utah	W 89–72	12–3 (3–0)	Marriott Center; Provo, Utah
January 17		Wyoming	L 53–56	12–4 (3–1)	Marriott Center; Provo, Utah
January 19		Colorado State	W 104–82	13–4 (4–1)	Marriott Center; Provo, Utah
January 24		at San Diego State	W 123–91	14–4 (5–1)	San Diego Sports Arena; San Diego, California
January 26		at Hawaii	W 34–33	15–4 (6–1)	Neal S. Blaisdell Center; Honolulu, Hawaii
January 31		UTEP	W 89–81	16–4 (7–1)	Marriott Center; Provo, Utah
February 2		New Mexico	W 89–68	17–4 (8–1)	Marriott Center; Provo, Utah
February 9		at Utah	W 83–82	18–4 (9–1)	Jon M. Huntsman Center; Salt Lake City, Utah
February 12*		Utah State	W 84–83	19–4 (9–1)	Marriott Center; Provo, Utah
February 16*		Alaska	W 93–59	20–4 (9–1)	Marriott Center; Provo, Utah
February 21		at Colorado State	W 111–86	21–4 (10–1)	Moby Arena; Fort Collins, Colorado
February 23		at Wyoming	W 39–30	22–4 (11–1)	War Memorial Fieldhouse; Laramie, Wyoming
February 28		Hawaii	W 107–82	23–4 (12–1)	Marriott Center; Provo, Utah
March 1		San Diego State	W 114–81	24–4 (13–1)	Marriott Center; Provo, Utah
NCAA Tournament
March 8*		at Clemson	L 66–71	24–5 (13–1)	Dee Events Center; Ogden, Utah
*Non-conference game. ^{#}Rankings from AP Poll. (#) Tournament seedings in parentheses.
