= 1978–79 BYU Cougars men's basketball team =

American college basketball season

1978–79 BYU Cougars men's basketball

WAC champion

NCAA Tournament, Second round
- Conference: Western Athletic Conference
- Record: 20-8 (10-2 WAC)
- Head coach: Frank Arnold
- Assistant coaches: Roger Reid; Harry Anderson
- Home arena: Marriott Center

1978–79 WAC men's basketball standings
| | Conf. | | | | Overall |
| Team | W | | L | PCT | W | | L | PCT |
|---|---|---|---|---|---|---|---|---|
| BYU | 10 | – | 2 | .833 | 20 | – | 8 | .714 |
| Utah | 9 | – | 3 | .750 | 20 | – | 10 | .667 |
| New Mexico | 8 | – | 4 | .667 | 19 | – | 10 | .655 |
| Wyoming | 5 | – | 7 | .417 | 15 | – | 12 | .556 |
| San Diego State | 4 | – | 8 | .333 | 15 | – | 12 | .556 |
| UTEP | 3 | – | 9 | .250 | 11 | – | 15 | .423 |
| Colorado State | 3 | – | 9 | .250 | 11 | – | 16 | .407 |
Rankings from AP Poll

The 1978–79 BYU Cougars men's basketball team represented Brigham Young University in the 1978–79 college basketball season. This was head coach Frank Arnold's 4th season at BYU. The Cougars reached the NCAA tournament and finished the season with a record of 20–8, 10–2 in the Western Athletic Conference.

== Roster ==
1978–79 BYU Cougars men's basketball team
Players
Coaches

| Pos. | # | Name | Height | Weight | Year | Hometown |
|---|---|---|---|---|---|---|
| G | 22 | Danny Ainge | 6 ft 5 in (1.96 m) | 190 lb (86 kg) | So | Eugene, Oregon |
| F | 34 | Fred Roberts | 6 ft 10 in (2.08 m) | 220 lb (100 kg) | Fr | Riverton, Utah |
| F | 35 | Devin Durrant | 6 ft 7 in (2.01 m) | 190 lb (86 kg) | Fr | Provo, Utah |

Head coach

- Roger Reid

Assistant coach(es)

Legend

- (C) Team captain
- (S) Suspended
- (I) Ineligible
- (W) Walk-on
- Injured
- Current redshirt

== Schedule ==
| Date time, TV | Rank^{#} | Opponent^{#} | Result | Record | Site city, state |
Regular Season
| Nov 24, 1978* | | Hawaii | W 93–69 | 1–0 | Marriott Center; Provo, Utah |
| Nov 25, 1978* | | Portland State | W 111–82 | 2–0 | Marriott Center; Provo, Utah |
| Dec 1, 1978* | | at Baylor | W 92–86 | 3–0 | Heart O' Texas Coliseum; Waco, Texas |
| Dec 2, 1978* | | at No. 13 Texas | L 57–96 | 3–1 | Frank Erwin Center; Austin, Texas |
| Dec 6, 1978* | | Utah State | W 99–80 | 4–1 | Marriott Center; Provo, Utah |
| Dec 8, 1978* | | Saint Joseph's | W 90–71 | 5–1 | Marriott Center; Provo, Utah |
| Dec 9, 1978* | | Purdue | W 76–64 | 6–1 | Marriott Center; Provo, Utah |
| Dec 14, 1978* | | at Rhode Island | L 76–85 | 6–2 | Providence Civic Center; Kingston, Rhode Island |
| Dec 16, 1978* | | at St. John's | L 83–90 | 6–3 | Alumni Hall; New York, New York |
| Dec 21, 1978* | | Harvard | W 113–72 | 7–3 | Marriott Center; Provo, Utah |
| Dec 23, 1978* | | Oral Roberts | W 120–104 | 8–3 | Marriott Center; Provo, Utah |
| Dec 29, 1978* | | vs. Georgia Tech | L 81–83 | 8–4 | Met Center; Bloomington, Minnesota |
| Dec 30, 1978* | | vs. Houston | W 84–77 | 9–4 | Met Center; Bloomington, Minnesota |
| Jan 4, 1979* | | Denver | W 92–53 | 10–4 | Marriott Center; Provo, Utah |
| Jan 6, 1979* | | at Utah State | L 68–84 | 10–5 | Dee Glen Smith Spectrum; Logan, Utah |
| Jan 11, 1979 | | UTEP | W 80–56 | 11–5 (1–0) | Marriott Center; Provo, Utah |
| Jan 13, 1979 | | New Mexico | W 100–83 | 12–5 (2–0) | Marriott Center; Provo, Utah |
| Jan 20, 1979 | | at Utah | W 90–76 | 13–5 (3–0) | Jon M. Huntsman Center; Salt Lake City, Utah |
| Jan 25, 1979 | | at Colorado State | W 98–83 | 14–5 (4–0) | Moby Arena; Fort Collins, Colorado |
| Jan 27, 1979 | | at Wyoming | L 69–71 | 14–6 (4–1) | War Memorial Fieldhouse; Laramie, Wyoming |
| Feb 3, 1979 | | San Diego State | W 88–80 | 15–6 (5–1) | Marriott Center; Provo, Utah |
| Feb 9, 1979 | | at New Mexico | L 65–66 | 15–7 (5–2) | University Arena; Albuquerque, New Mexico |
| Feb 10, 1979 | | at UTEP | W 77–68 | 16–7 (6–2) | Special Events Center; El Paso, Texas |
| Feb 17, 1979 | | Utah | W 76–50 | 17–7 (7–2) | Marriott Center; Provo, Utah |
| Feb 22, 1979 | | Wyoming | W 78–73 | 18–7 (8–2) | Marriott Center; Provo, Utah |
| Feb 24, 1979 | | Colorado State | W 66–61 | 19–7 (9–2) | Marriott Center; Provo, Utah |
| Mar 2, 1979 | | at San Diego State | W 96–95 | 20–7 (10–2) | San Diego Sports Arena; San Diego, California |
NCAA Tournament
| Mar 11, 1979* | (5 W) | vs. (4 W) No. 19 San Francisco; Second round | L 63–86 | 20–8 | McKale Center; Tucson, Arizona |
*Non-conference game. ^{#}Rankings from AP Poll. (#) Tournament seedings in parentheses. W=West.
