= 1980–81 BYU Cougars men's basketball team =

American college basketball season

1980–81 BYU Cougars men's basketball

NCAA Tournament 3-Seed, Elite Eight
- Conference: Western Athletic Conference

Ranking
- Coaches: No. 17
- AP: No. 16
- Record: 25–7 (12–4 WAC)
- Head coach: Frank Arnold (6th season)
- Assistant coaches: Roger Reid (3rd season); Harry Anderson
- Home arena: Marriott Center

1980–81 WAC men's basketball standings
	Conf.				Overall
Team	W		L	PCT	W		L	PCT
No. 14 Utah	13	–	3	.813	25	–	5	.833
No. 17 Wyoming	13	–	3	.813	24	–	6	.800
No. 16 BYU	12	–	4	.750	25	–	7	.781
UTEP	9	–	7	.563	18	–	12	.600
San Diego State	8	–	8	.500	15	–	12	.556
Hawaii	7	–	9	.438	14	–	13	.519
New Mexico	6	–	10	.375	11	–	15	.423
Air Force	3	–	13	.188	9	–	18	.333
Colorado State	1	–	15	.063	3	–	24	.111
Rankings from AP Poll

The 1980–81 BYU Cougars men's basketball team represented Brigham Young University in the 1980–81 college basketball season. This was head coach Frank Arnold's sixth season at BYU. The Cougars played their home games at the Marriott Center and reached the Elite Eight, where they fell to Virginia.

== Personnel ==
1980–81 BYU Cougars men's basketball team
Players
Coaches

Pos.	#	Name	Height	Weight	Year	Hometown
G	22	Danny Ainge	6 ft 5 in (1.96 m)	188 lb (85 kg)	Sr	Eugene, Oregon
G	24	Greg Baliff	6 ft 3 in (1.91 m)	190 lb (86 kg)	Jr	Provo, Utah
F	31	John Batholomew	6 ft 6 in (1.98 m)	195 lb (88 kg)	Sr	Raleigh, North Carolina
G	25	Dave Challis	6 ft 4 in (1.93 m)	170 lb (77 kg)	Sr	Walnut Creek, California
G	21	Craig Christensen	6 ft 4 in (1.93 m)	185 lb (84 kg)	Jr	Salt Lake City, Utah
G	23	Steve Craig	6 ft 3 in (1.91 m)	180 lb (82 kg)	Sr	Los Angeles, California
F	42	Gary Furniss	6 ft 8 in (2.03 m)	215 lb (98 kg)	So	Driggs, Idaho
C	50	Greg Kite	6 ft 11 in (2.11 m)	250 lb (113 kg)	So	Houston, TX
G	21	Mike Maxwell	6 ft 1 in (1.85 m)	160 lb (73 kg)	So	Salt Lake City, Utah
C	52	Dave McGuire	7 ft 0 in (2.13 m)	225 lb (102 kg)	Jr	West Covina, California
F	32	Keith Rice	6 ft 5 in (1.96 m)	200 lb (91 kg)	Sr	Portland, Oregon
F	34	Fred Roberts	6 ft 10 in (2.08 m)	220 lb (100 kg)	Jr	Riverton, Utah
F	33	Timo Saarelainen	6 ft 6 in (1.98 m)	200 lb (91 kg)	Fr	Helsinki, Finland
F	44	Steve Trumbo	6 ft 8 in (2.03 m)	223 lb (101 kg)	Jr	Las Vegas, Nevada
G	23	Richie Webb	6 ft 5 in (1.96 m)	180 lb (82 kg)	Fr	Idaho Falls, Idaho

Head coach

Frank Arnold

Assistant coach(es)

- Harry Anderson
- Roger Reid

Legend

- (C) Team captain
- (S) Suspended
- (I) Ineligible
- (W) Walk-on
- Injured
- Current redshirt

Roster
Last update: 2022-Oct-17

== Schedule ==
Date time, TV	Rank^{#}	Opponent^{#}	Result	Record	Site city, state
Regular season
Nov 28, 1980*	No. 18	at Washington	W 80–70	1–0	Hec Edmundson Pavilion (8,059); Seattle, Washington
Nov 29, 1980*	No. 18	at No. 7 Oregon State	L 68–75	1–1	Gill Coliseum (10,000); Corvallis, Oregon
Dec 6, 1980*	No. 19	at Utah State	W 82–79	2–1	Dee Glen Smith Spectrum (10,291); Logan, Utah
Dec 12, 1980*	No. 19	North Texas	W 108–92	3–1	Marriott Center (21,758); Provo, Utah
Dec 13, 1980*	No. 19	Saint Mary's	W 95–76	4–1	Marriott Center (21,583); Provo, Utah
Dec 16, 1980*	No. 18	Michigan State	W 82–50	5–1	Marriott Center (20,703); Provo, Utah
Dec 19, 1980*	No. 18	vs. No. 17 Illinois	W 80–75	6–1	Stokely Athletic Center (11,905); Knoxville, Tennessee
Dec 20, 1980*	No. 18	at Tennessee	L 65–81	6–2	Stokely Athletic Center (12,700); Knoxville, Tennessee
Dec 23, 1980*	No. 20	at Weber State	W 85–78	7–2	Dee Events Center (10,118); Ogden, Utah
Dec 27, 1980*	No. 20	Utah State	W 104–89	8–2	Marriott Center (23,037); Provo, Utah
Jan 2, 1981	No. 19	at Air Force	W 77–65	9–2 (1–0)	Clune Arena (5,600); Colorado Springs, Colorado
Jan 3, 1981*	No. 19	at UNLV	W 92–90	10–2	Las Vegas Convention Center (6,393); Las Vegas, Nevada
Jan 8, 1981	No. 17	San Diego State	W 84–73	11–2 (2–0)	Marriott Center (22,718); Provo, Utah
Jan 10, 1981	No. 17	Hawaii	W 91–74	12–2 (3–0)	Marriott Center (22,873); Provo, Utah
Jan 15, 1981	No. 15	at New Mexico	W 92–87	13–2 (4–0)	University Arena (16,416); Albuquerque, New Mexico
Jan 17, 1981	No. 15	at UTEP	L 62–64	13–3 (4–1)	Special Events Center (9,825); El Paso, Texas
Jan 23, 1981	No. 18	Colorado State	W 66–46	14–3 (5–1)	Marriott Center (22,697); Provo, Utah
Jan 24, 1981	No. 18	Wyoming	W 84–70	15–3 (6–1)	Marriott Center (22,983); Provo, Utah
Jan 31, 1981	No. 15	at No. 9 Utah	L 56–60	15–4 (6–2)	Jon M. Huntsman Center (15,281); Salt Lake City, Utah
Feb 6, 1981	No. 16	UNLV	W 86–77	16–4	Marriott Center (22,841); Provo, Utah
Feb 7, 1981	No. 16	Air Force	W 62–51	17–4 (7–2)	Marriott Center (22,724); Provo, Utah
Feb 12, 1981	No. 15	at Hawaii	W 77–72	18–4 (8–2)	Neal S. Blaisdell Center (3,948); Honolulu, Hawaii
Feb 14, 1981	No. 15	at San Diego State	L 72–73	18–5 (8–3)	San Diego Sports Arena (6,883); San Diego, California
Feb 19, 1981	No. 17	UTEP	W 84–75	19–5 (9–3)	Marriott Center (22,373); Provo, Utah
Feb 21, 1981	No. 17	New Mexico	W 78–72	20–5 (10–3)	Marriott Center (22,184); Provo, Utah
Feb 26, 1981	No. 15	at Wyoming	L 84–86	20–6 (10–4)	War Memorial Fieldhouse (9,300); Laramie, Wyoming
Feb 28, 1981	No. 15	at Colorado State	W 80–69	21–6 (11–4)	Moby Arena (5,107); Fort Collins, Colorado
Mar 7, 1981	No. 18	No. 9 Utah	W 95–76	22–6 (12–4)	Marriott Center (23,106); Provo, Utah
NCAA Tournament
Mar 12, 1981*	(6 E) No. 16	vs. (11 E) Princeton; First round	W 60–51	23–6	Providence Civic Center (8,273); Providence, Rhode Island
Mar 14, 1981*	(6 E) No. 16	vs. (3 E) No. 10 UCLA; Second Round	W 78–55	24–6	Providence Civic Center (12,823); Providence, Rhode Island
Mar 19, 1981*	(6 E) No. 16	vs. (2 E) No. 7 Notre Dame; East Regional semifinal – Sweet Sixteen	W 51–50	25–6	Omni Coliseum (15,461); Atlanta, Georgia
Mar 21, 1981*	(6 E) No. 16	vs. (1 E) No. 5 Virginia; East Regional final – Elite Eight	L 60–74	25–7	Omni Coliseum (15,461); Atlanta, Georgia
*Non-conference game. ^{#}Rankings from AP Poll. (#) Tournament seedings in parentheses. E=East.

== Awards and honors ==
- Danny Ainge – WAC Player of the Year

== NBA draft ==
Round	Pick	Player	NBA club
2	31	Danny Ainge	Boston Celtics
