= Sean Farnham =

American sports analyst (born 1977)

Sean Travis Farnham (born September 16, 1977) is an American sports analyst who covers college basketball for ESPN. He played college basketball for the UCLA Bruins.

Farnham typically calls games featuring the Southeastern Conference as part of ESPN's Super Tuesday and Thursday Night Showcase packages, while he has previously called games for the Big Ten Conference, Atlantic Coast Conference, Western Athletic Conference, West Coast Conference Pac-12 Conference and the Big 12 Conference.

Before joining ESPN, Farnham worked for CBS Sports Network, then known as CSTV and CBS College Sports, calling games from the Mountain West Conference, the Atlantic 10 Conference, and Conference USA. He has also called Pac-12 games for Fox Sports West.

== Early life ==
Farnham was born in Walnut Creek, California. He grew up in Clayton, California, and attended De La Salle High School, where he played basketball. Farnham was a member of the powerful Oakland Soldiers AAU program; it was on this team that he gained attention for his play at the BCI event in Phoenix in July 1993, where he was named BCI All-American. He led De La Salle to their first-ever NorCal championship his senior year in 1996, when they also faced Crenshaw in the D-1 state final. After high school, Farnham would play for the UCLA Bruins from 1997–2000.

== College career ==
Farnham entered UCLA as a walk-on so he could play for a national title contender, passing up athletic scholarship offers from other universities. He earned a scholarship days before the start of his freshman year. On a year-to-year scholarship, Farnham's funding was cut off during his junior year in 1998–99, as UCLA coach Steve Lavin used it to secure one of the best recruiting classes in the nation. In that season's Pac-10 conference (later known as the Pac-12) opener against No. 6 Arizona, Farnham received his first career start after JaRon Rush had been suspended, and Jerome Moiso and Dan Gadzuric were benched for not practicing earlier in the week. Farnham left the game after four minutes with UCLA ahead 13–4, and the Bruins won 82–75 over the previously undefeated Wildcats. Farnham regained his scholarship as a senior in 1999–2000.

During his time at UCLA, Farnham was known for his hard work, effort, and determination. During his four seasons in Westwood, Farnham took home several team awards: Freshman of the Year in 1997, Most Improved in 1999, and the UCLA Faculty Athletic Representative Award in 2000. During the 1997–98 season, Farnham told Bill Macdonald that he had an easy job. Farnham then proceeded to deliver an intro that the producer at Fox Sports West heard over the headset. After the game, Fox Sports West approached Farnham and offered him an unpaid position that wouldn't violate NCAA rules but would allow Farnham to deliver insights on players at UCLA and across the Pac-12 Conference. Farnham took the position and continued doing these profiles until his graduation in 2000. During his senior season, Farnham would play in 23 games, start in 11, and average 1.2 rebounds and 1.3 assists. During his career, UCLA had a 19–2 record with Farnham as a starter.

== Coaching & Broadcasting ==
Upon graduation, Farnham would be hired as an assistant coach at Pepperdine University. Farnham became the youngest assistant coach in the nation, working alongside Jan van Breda Kolff. Despite an impressive record of 22–9, his tenure in coaching lasted only one season. Van Breda Kolff would be hired as the head coach at Saint Bonaventure University, and Farnham found himself with two choices: head east, or find a new job in the West. He called up his old friends at Fox Sports West, where his broadcasting career would begin. Farnham would initially start with doing athlete profiles, but he would work his way up to high school analyst and then college basketball analyst. During his 10-year broadcast career at Fox Sports West, Farnham would win two Los Angeles-based broadcast Emmys, and cover the Lakers, Clippers, Angels, and Dodgers as well.

In addition to his television broadcasts, Farnham would add radio broadcasting career to his resume. Beginning in 2003, Farnham would host postgame shows for the Lakers, USC, and UCLA on ESPN 710 AM. In 2008 Farnham became the co-host for a nationally syndicated afternoon drive show with Chris Meyers on Fox Sports Radio. He would remain on the afternoon show until he was hired with ESPN in 2010. During these years at Fox Sports Radio, Farnham anchored their NFL Draft show, and was on-site for multiple Super Bowls, World Series, MLB All-Star Games, Final Fours, Daytona 500, American Century Golf Championships, and the Dew Action Sports Tour.

During his time with ESPN, Farnham has partnered with Dan Shulman, David Flemming, Joe Tessitore, Dave O'Brien, and Carter Blackburn on game broadcasts. He has appeared on First Take, The Herd, SportsCenter, College Basketball Live, Katz Korner, Get Up, The Experts, BYU Sports Nation, and Numbers Never Lie.

== Personal life ==
Farnham currently lives in California with his wife and children.

The uncle of Farnham's wife is Michael Mullen, the former Chairman of the Joint Chiefs of Staff. In 2012, Farnham launched Hoops From Home, a non-profit organization that brought basketball camps to children of military personnel living on military bases.
