= Kyle Collinsworth =

American basketball player (born 1991)

Personal information
- Born: October 3, 1991 (age 34) Provo, Utah, U.S.
- Listed height: 6 ft 6 in (1.98 m)
- Listed weight: 210 lb (95 kg)

Career information
- High school: Provo (Provo, Utah)
- College: BYU (2010–2011, 2013–2016)
- NBA draft: 2016: undrafted
- Playing career: 2016–2023
- Position: Point guard
- Number: 6, 5, 2, 55

Career history
- 2016–2018: Texas Legends
- 2017–2018: Dallas Mavericks
- 2018–2019: Raptors 905
- 2019–2020: Salt Lake City Stars
- 2020–2022: SeaHorses Mikawa
- 2022–2023: San-en NeoPhoenix

Career highlights
- WCC Player of the Year (2016); 3× First-team All-WCC (2014–2016); 2× AP honorable mention All-American (2015, 2016); Utah Mr. Basketball (2010)
- Stats at NBA.com
- Stats at Basketball Reference

Kyle Collinsworth (born October 3, 1991) is an American former professional basketball player. He played college basketball for Brigham Young University (BYU). During the 2014–15 season, Collinsworth broke the NCAA single-season record for triple-doubles with six, which also tied the NCAA career record. On March 16, 2016, Collinsworth recorded his twelfth career triple-double, extending the NCAA record he set earlier in the season.

== High school career ==
Born in Provo, Utah, Collinsworth attended Provo High School, where he was a four-year starter and played for teams that won two 4A state titles. He was three times named to the first-team all-state team. As a senior, he averaged 23.7 points, 10.8 rebounds, 8.3 assists, 4.0 steals, and 2.0 blocks per game and recorded five triple-doubles. He was Deseret News Mr. Basketball, Salt Lake Tribune Male Athlete of the Year and Utah Gatorade Player of the Year. He was also selected to play in the 2010 High School Academic All-American Classic.

Collinsworth was recruited by ASU, BYU, Cal, Stanford, Gonzaga, Kansas, USC, Utah, Utah State, Virginia, and Washington State. He committed to play college basketball at BYU and signed his letter of intent on November 12, 2009.

== College career ==
=== Freshman year ===
As a freshman, Collinsworth averaged 5.8 points, 5.1 rebounds, 2.1 assists and 1.1 steals while shooting .481 from the field, .259 from three and .568 from the free throw line. He posted season highs of 16 points, 15 rebounds, 6 assists, 4 steals and 3 blocks and recorded 1 double-double. He posted 15 rebounds against Florida in the NCAA Tournament. Following his freshman season, Collinsworth departed on a two-year LDS mission to Russia.

=== Sophomore year ===
Following his LDS mission, Collinsworth was readmitted to BYU and was named as a team captain for the 2013–14 season. As a sophomore, he averaged 14.0 points, 8.1 rebounds, 4.6 assists and 1.7 steals and recorded 7 double-doubles. He ranked second in the WCC in rebounding (83rd in the nation), third in steals (89th nationally), and third in assists (60th nationally). He was one of only four players in the country to be ranked in the top 100 in assists and steals. Collinsworth was named to the All-WCC First Team, the WCC All-Tournament Team, and the CollegeSportsMadness.com All-WCC Third Team.

=== Junior year ===
In his junior year, Collinsworth averaged 13.5 points, 8.7 rebounds, 5.9 assists per game, and set an NCAA single-season record of six triple-doubles. That also tied an NCAA record for career triple-doubles, joining former Drexel guard Michael Anderson and past LSU superstar center Shaquille O'Neal. Collinsworth was the only player in the nation who ranked in the top 100 nationally in rebounds (42nd), assists (16th), and steals (71st) per game. He ranked second in the WCC in each category, and was again named All-WCC First Team and WCC All-Tournament Team at the end of the season.

=== Senior year ===
On February 1, 2016, Collinsworth was named one of 10 finalists for the Bob Cousy Point Guard of the Year Award. For the season, he averaged 15.3 points, 8.2 rebounds, and 7.4 assists per game - ranking 5th in the nation in the latter. With a triple-double against UAB, he tied his own single-season record for triple doubles with six, and extended his NCAA record for career triple doubles to 12, which still stands today in NCAA men's basketball. (In women's play, Sabrina Ionescu had 26 for Oregon from 2016 to 2020.) He led his team to the NIT final four, although the NCAA ordered the NIT appearance and all but one of BYU's wins in that season vacated due to findings that BYU boosters had provided improper benefits to Collinsworth's teammate Nick Emery. (Note: Collinsworth's triple-double record was not affected by this NCAA action. The only season in which Collinsworth played that was affected by NCAA sanctions was his senior season of 2015–16, and the NCAA's official decision specified that Emery was the only player who would have any records vacated in that season. Specifically, Page 15 of the decision stated that "...the individual finishes and any awards for all eligible student-athletes shall be retained.") For his efforts, Collinsworth was named WCC Player of the Year, and again repeated as All-WCC First Team (for the third season in a row). He was also named Honorable Mention All-American by several media organizations, including the Associated Press.

=== College statistics ===
Year	Team	GP	GS	MPG	FG%	3P%	FT%	RPG	APG	SPG	BPG	PPG
2010–11	BYU	36	26	25.7	.481	.259	.568	5.1	2.1	1.1	0.4	5.8
2013–14	BYU	34	33	33.4	.497	.364	.576	8.1	4.6	1.7	0.4	14.0
2014–15	BYU	33	33	30.9	.472	.286	.736	8.7	6.0	1.8	0.3	13.8
2015–16	BYU	37	36	33.8	.464	.243	.652	8.2	7.4	2.0	0.5	15.3
Career		140	128	30.9	.477	.280	.642	7.5	5.0	1.6	0.4	12.2

== Professional career ==
=== Texas Legends (2016–2018) ===
After going undrafted in the 2016 NBA draft, Collinsworth joined the Dallas Mavericks for the 2016 NBA Summer League. On July 21, 2016, he signed with the Mavericks, but was waived on October 22 after appearing in five preseason games. On October 30, 2016, he was acquired by the Texas Legends of the NBA Development League, now known as the NBA G League, as an affiliate player of the Mavericks.

On March 30, 2017, Collinsworth was waived by the Legends. He was then reacquired by the Legends for their 2017 training camp.

=== Dallas Mavericks (2017–2018) ===
On December 19, 2017, Collinsworth was signed by the Dallas Mavericks to a two-way contract. During that time, he split playing time between the Mavericks and their G-League affiliate the Texas Legends. He made his debut a day later, in a 110–93 win over the Detroit Pistons, in which he recorded three points, a steal and a rebound in 13 minutes of action. He was waived on January 11, 2018, but was re-signed to a 10-day contract two days later. The Mavericks let his second 10-day contract expire. On February 8, 2018, the Mavericks signed him for the rest of the season.

He was waived by the Mavericks on July 6, 2018, and played for them in the 2018 NBA Summer League.

On September 14, 2018, Collinsworth signed with the Toronto Raptors on a training camp deal. On October 12, 2018, Collinsworth was waived by the Raptors.

=== Salt Lake City Stars (2019–2020) ===
Collinsworth was added to the opening night roster of the Salt Lake City Stars in 2019. On January 18, 2020, Collinsworth scored 16 points, grabbed 15 rebounds and dished out seven assists in a loss to the Westchester Knicks. He sat out with an unspecified illness between January 24 and February 19.

=== SeaHorses Mikawa (2020–2022) ===
On October 9, 2020, the SeaHorses Mikawa announced that they had signed with Collinsworth.

=== San-en NeoPhoenix (2022–2023) ===
On July 1, 2022, the San-en NeoPhoenix announced that Collinsworth is part of the team for the 2022–23 season.

== Career statistics ==
Legend
GP	Games played	GS	Games started	MPG	Minutes per game
FG%	Field goal percentage	3P%	3-point field goal percentage	FT%	Free throw percentage
RPG	Rebounds per game	APG	Assists per game	SPG	Steals per game
BPG	Blocks per game	PPG	Points per game	**Bold**	Career high

=== NBA ===
Year	Team	GP	GS	MPG	FG%	3P%	FT%	RPG	APG	SPG	BPG	PPG
2017–18	Dallas	32	2	15.0	.384	.235	.525	3.3	1.8	.5	.3	3.2
Career		32	2	15.0	.384	.235	.525	3.3	1.8	.5	.3	3.2

=== G League ===
Year	Team	GP	GS	MPG	FG%	3P%	FT%	RPG	APG	SPG	BPG	PPG
2016-17	Texas Legends	36	16	27.3	.430	.286	.549	7.0	3.8	1.7	.9	6.4
2017-18	Texas Legends	20	19	35.6	.483	.317	.552	8.7	5.4	1.8	.3	10.9
2018-19	Raptors 905	28	28	31.1	.449	.322	.655	7.5	3.6	1.8	.7	10.5
2019-20	Salt Lake City	25	19	26.8	.510	.308	.600	6.0	3.0	.8	.2	9.5
Career		109	82	29.7	.465	.309	.588	7.2	3.9	1.5	.6	9.0

=== B.League ===
==== Regular season ====
Year	Team	GP	GS	MPG	FG%	3P%	FT%	RPG	APG	SPG	BPG	PPG
2020-21	Mikawa	48	44	26.7	.518	.318	.556	9.0	6.0	1.1	.2	9.1
2021-22	Mikawa	25	25	24.8	.558	.235	.591	6.8	5.5	1.7	.4	8.2
Career		73	69	26.1	.530	.295	.567	8.2	5.8	1.3	.2	8.7

==== Playoffs ====
Year	Team	GP	GS	MPG	FG%	3P%	FT%	RPG	APG	SPG	BPG	PPG
2020-21	Mikawa	2	2	35.8	.500	.000	.583	8.0	5.5	3.5	1.5	11.5
Career		2	2	35.8	.500	.000	.583	8.0	5.5	3.5	1.5	11.5

== Personal life ==
Collinsworth served as a missionary for the Church of Jesus Christ of Latter-day Saints for two years (2011–2012) in Russia between his freshman and sophomore years of college. He is married to Shea Martinez-Collinsworth, an All-American 800m runner on the BYU track team. Together they started the blog Athlete's Guide 5, which gave advice to youth about improving athletic performance through 2018 when it became defunct. His older brother, Chris, played for BYU Men's Basketball, but his playing career was cut short due to injuries.

== See also ==
- List of NCAA Division I basketball career triple-doubles leaders
