= Glenn Potter =

American basketball coach

Glenn Potter (born c. 1938) is a former college basketball coach, who succeeded Stan Watts at Brigham Young University in 1972. Potter coached three seasons for the Cougars and posted a 42–36 (.538) record before resigning in 1975. He was replaced by Frank Arnold
