= Jackson Emery =

American basketball player (born 1987)

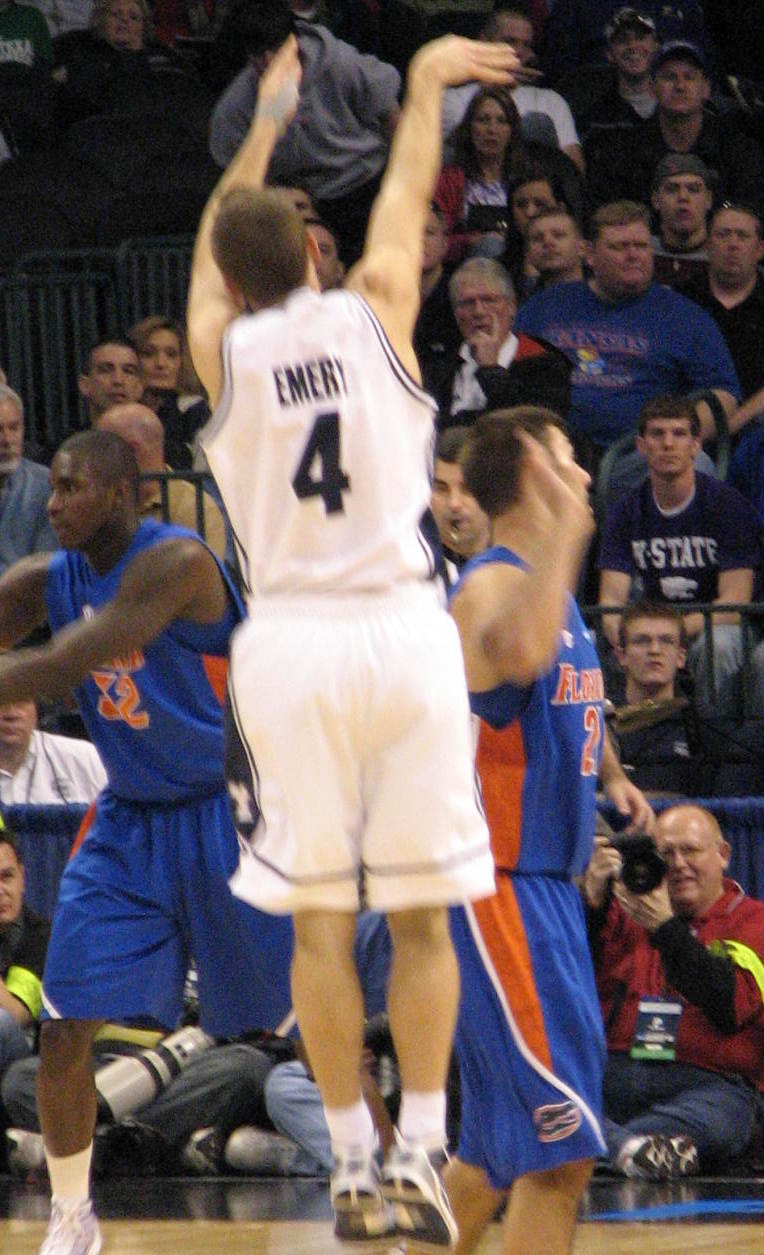

Personal information
- Born: June 22, 1987 (age 39) Salt Lake City, Utah, U.S.
- Listed height: 6 ft 3 in (1.91 m)
- Listed weight: 190 lb (86 kg)

Career information
- High school: Lone Peak (Highland, Utah)
- College: BYU (2005–2006, 2008–2011)
- NBA draft: 2008: undrafted
- Position: Shooting guard

Career highlights
- MWC Defensive Player of the Year (2011); Utah Mr. Basketball (2005)

Jackson Emery (born June 22, 1987) is an American former basketball player who played for the BYU Cougars men's basketball team.

Emery was born in Salt Lake City and grew up in Alpine, Utah. He earned several accolades for his basketball performance in high school, leading his team to a state championship and being named Utah Mr. Basketball in 2005. Emery was recruited by nine schools for collegiate play and elected to attend Brigham Young University, which is sponsored by the Church of Jesus Christ of Latter-day Saints, of which he is a member. After his freshman year, he took a two-year hiatus to serve an LDS mission in Mexico, then returned to BYU. Emery is married, and finished his senior year serving as co-captain of the team alongside Jimmer Fredette and Logan Magnusson. In Emery's senior season, he was named the Mountain West Conference defensive player of the year. He holds both BYU's and the MWC's all-time season and career steal records.

Seeing virtually no interest from anyone in professional basketball, Emery ended his basketball career, and began working for EcoScraps, a composting company. On 23 September 2011, he played in the Jimmer All-Star Game. Jackson currently works for Domo, a business intelligence software company based in American Fork, Utah. He serves as a Corporate Account Development Manager.

== See also ==
- 2008–09 BYU Cougars men's basketball team
- 2009–10 BYU Cougars men's basketball team
- 2010–11 BYU Cougars men's basketball team
