= Frank Arnold (basketball) =

American college basketball coach (1934–2024)

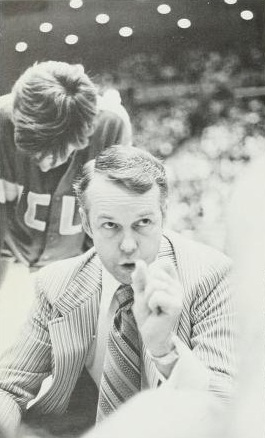
- Arnold from 1973 UCLA yearbook

Biographical details
- Born: October 1, 1934; Ogden, Utah, U.S.
- Died: June 8, 2024 (aged 89)

Playing career
- 1954–1956: Idaho State

Coaching career (HC unless noted)
- 1956–1958: Payette HS (assistant)
- 1958–1960: Brigham Young HS
- 1960–1962: BYU Laboratory HS
- 1962–1963: Oregon (GA)
- 1963–1964: Pocatello HS
- 1964–1966: Clark JC
- 1966–1971: Oregon (assistant)
- 1971–1975: UCLA (assistant)
- 1975–1983: BYU
- 1985–1987: Hawaii
- 1987–1989: Arizona State (assistant)

Head coaching record
- Overall: 148–139 (college); 30–22 (junior college)
- Tournaments: 3–3 (NCAA Division I); 0–1 (NIT)

Accomplishments and honors

Championships
- 3 WAC regular season (1979, 1980, 1983)

Frank Harold Arnold (October 1, 1934 – June 8, 2024) was an American college basketball coach. He served as the head basketball coach at Brigham Young University (BYU) from 1975 to 1983 and at the University of Hawaii at Manoa from 1985 to 1987.

== Early life and college playing career ==
Arnold was born in Ogden, Utah, on October 1, 1934. He grew up in Pocatello, Idaho, and graduated from Pocatello High School in 1952. He then attended Idaho State University in Pocatello and lettered on the Idaho State Bengals basketball team from 1954 to 1956.

== Coaching career ==
After graduating from Idaho State in 1956, Arnold became an assistant basketball coach at Payette High School in Payette, Idaho, in 1956. In 1958, Arnold became head coach at Brigham Young High School in Provo, Utah, and enrolled in graduate school at the Brigham Young University College of Education, from which he earned a master's degree in education in 1960, then coached at BYU's laboratory school until 1962.

In 1962, Arnold enrolled in a doctoral program at the University of Oregon and became a graduate assistant on the Ducks basketball team. In 1963, Arnold returned to Pocatello High to be head coach. The following year, Arnold moved to Vancouver, Washington, to be head coach at Clark Junior College, where he would stay for two seasons until 1966. Arnold then returned to the University of Oregon to be assistant coach under Steve Belko, who coached Arnold at Idaho State.

Arnold joined John Wooden's staff at UCLA in 1971 to replace Denny Crum, who left to take the head coaching position at Louisville. He was tutored by the “Wizard of Westwood” during the school's glory years, including three NCAA championships in four seasons.

Hired in 1975 to replace Glenn Potter at BYU, Arnold led the Cougars to a 137–94 (.593) record, with three consecutive Western Athletic Conference (WAC) titles, three trips to NCAA tournament, and another to the National Invitation Tournament (NIT) in 1982. BYU made it to the NCAA final 8 in 1981 with a team starring future NBA players Danny Ainge, Greg Kite, and Fred Roberts. Arnold struggled after the 1981 season and finished coaching at BYU in 1983.

Arnold accepted the head coaching position at the University of Hawaii in 1985 and coached at the school for two seasons and led the Rainbow Warriors to an 11–45 (.196) record. He resigned in 1987 and noted that his lack of success at the school was because "In order to win here you have to have J.C. transfers and that doesn't fit into my recruiting or coaching style". Arnold then was an assistant at Arizona State for two seasons.

== Personal life and death ==
His son Gib Arnold also became a basketball coach and was most recently head coach at Hawaii from 2010 to 2014.

Frank Arnold died on June 8, 2024, at the age of 89.

== Head coaching record ==
=== Junior college ===
Record table
Season	Team	Overall	Conference	Standing	Postseason
Clark Penguins (Northwestern Athletic Conference) (1964–1966)
1964–65	Clark	15–11	12–4	2nd (Western)	
1965–66	Clark	15–11	11–5	T–2nd (Western)	
Clark:		30–22	23–9		
Total:		30–22			

=== College ===
Record table
Season	Team	Overall	Conference	Standing	Postseason
BYU Cougars (Western Athletic Conference) (1975–1983)
1975–76	BYU	12–14	6–8	T–5th	
1976–77	BYU	12–15	4–10	7th	
1977–78	BYU	12–18	6–8	T–4th	
1978–79	BYU	20–8	10–2	1st	NCAA Division I Second Round
1979–80	BYU	24–5	13–1	1st	NCAA Division I Second Round
1980–81	BYU	25–7	12–4	3rd	NCAA Division I Elite Eight
1981–82	BYU	17–13	9–7	T–4th	NIT First Round
1982–83	BYU	15–14	11–5	T–1st	
BYU:		137–94	71–45		
Hawaii Rainbow Warriors (Western Athletic Conference) (1985–1987)
1985–86	Hawaii	4–24	1–15	9th	
1986–87	Hawaii	7–21	2–14	T–8th	
Hawaii:		11–45	3–29		
Total:		148–139			
National champion Postseason invitational champion Conference regular season champion Conference regular season and conference tournament champion Division regular season champion Division regular season and conference tournament champion Conference tournament champion
