= Fred Roberts =

American basketball player

Personal information
- Born: August 14, 1960 (age 66) Provo, Utah, U.S.
- Listed height: 6 ft 10 in (2.08 m)
- Listed weight: 227 lb (103 kg)

Career information
- High school: Bingham (South Jordan, Utah)
- College: BYU (1978–1982)
- NBA draft: 1982: 2nd round, 27th overall pick
- Drafted by: Milwaukee Bucks
- Playing career: 1982–1997
- Position: Power forward / center
- Number: 11, 33, 31, 34, 24, 44

Career history
- 1982–1983: Fortitudo Bologna
- 1983–1984: San Antonio Spurs
- 1984–1986: Utah Jazz
- 1986–1988: Boston Celtics
- 1988–1993: Milwaukee Bucks
- 1993–1994: FC Barcelona
- 1994–1995: Chicago Rockers
- 1995: Cleveland Cavaliers
- 1995–1996: Los Angeles Lakers
- 1996–1997: Dallas Mavericks

Career highlights
- Spanish Cup (1994); 2× First-team All-WAC (1981, 1982); Third-team Parade All-American (1978)
- Stats at NBA.com
- Stats at Basketball Reference
Medals
Men's basketball
Representing United States
FIBA U19 World Championship
Gold medal – first place	1979 Salvador	National team

Frederick Clark Roberts (born August 14, 1960) is an American former basketball player who played power forward in the National Basketball Association (NBA) for 13 seasons, a career spanning from 1983 to 1997, becoming a successful journeymen in the league. He also played in FC Barcelona of the Liga ACB.

== College career ==
Roberts played four years of college basketball at Brigham Young University (BYU) in Utah, from 1978 to 1982. He played in 119 total games, averaged 15.5 points and seven rebounds and shot 54.6% from the field. His playing ability along with Danny Ainge and Greg Kite led to the success of the BYU program during this time. Roberts also played on the USA Junior World Championship Team in 1979, playing alongside greats such as James Worthy and leading the US to an undefeated 8–0 record.

=== College statistics ===
Legend
GP	Games played	GS	Games started	MPG	Minutes per game
FG%	Field goal percentage	3P%	3-point field goal percentage	FT%	Free throw percentage
RPG	Rebounds per game	APG	Assists per game	SPG	Steals per game
BPG	Blocks per game	PPG	Points per game	**Bold**	Career high

Year	Team	GP	GS	MPG	FG%	3P%	FT%	RPG	APG	SPG	BPG	PPG
1978–79	BYU	28	-	30.8	.543	-	.783	6.8	2.3	**0.9**	**0.8**	14.3
1979–80	BYU	29	-	30.7	**.588**	-	.724	6.1	2.5	0.3	0.7	12.9
1980–81	BYU	**32**	-	37.1	.579	-	.777	**8.0**	**3.4**	0.8	0.4	**18.8**
1981–82	BYU	30	-	**37.3**	.479	-	**.798**	7.2	3.2	0.7	0.6	15.5
Career		119	-	34.1	.546	-	.776	7.0	2.9	0.7	0.6	15.5

== Professional career ==
He was drafted by the Milwaukee Bucks in the second round of the 1982 NBA draft, but opted to play basketball for a year in Bologna, Italy. While overseas, Roberts was traded to the New Jersey Nets on November 12, 1982, for Phil Ford and a second-round draft choice, and from there was traded to the San Antonio Spurs on June 7, 1983, with other players in exchange for coach Stan Albeck. Afterwards, he played his first full NBA season with the Spurs.

He played just over a season with San Antonio before being traded to the Utah Jazz for two second-round draft picks. In September 1986, the Boston Celtics offered him a two-year deal worth $315,000, which the Jazz matched. Almost immediately after matching the offer, the Jazz traded him to Boston for a future draft pick and two Boston-Utah preseason games, the Celtics agreeing to play the Jazz twice during the next preseason as part of the trade. He played two seasons for the Celtics, appearing in the 1987 NBA Finals, before being chosen by the Miami Heat in the 1988 NBA expansion draft.

However, Roberts was traded to the Milwaukee Bucks before ever playing a game for the Heat. He played for the Bucks for five seasons, where he had his best years as a professional, reaching the 10 points per game mark and playing more minutes than he ever had in his career. The highlight of his time in Milwaukee came in Game 4 of the Eastern Conference semi-finals in 1989, in which Roberts replaced injured forward Terry Cummings and scored a career-high 33 points in a 96–94 loss to the Detroit Pistons. The performance was especially impressive considering it came against Dennis Rodman, one of the best defenders in the league. The tough, defense-minded Pistons would eventually win the NBA championship later that season. Roberts was released by the Bucks when his contract expired after the 1992-93 NBA season.

After not renewing with the Bucks in 1993, he signed with FC Barcelona of the Spanish Liga ACB, where in his only season he managed to win the Spanish Cup, defeating Taugrés Baskonia in the final. For the season he averaged 14.8 points and 5.8 rebounds per game.

After his second stint in Europe, he played for the Chicago Rockers of the Continental Basketball Association. He then signed a 10-day contract with the Cleveland Cavaliers, and was immediately put to work due to starting power forward Tyrone Hill going down with an ankle injury. Once Hill returned though, Roberts stopped seeing playing time, but considered his stint with the Cavs as a stepping stone.

He then signed with the Los Angeles Lakers for the 1995-96 season, playing only 33 games. Coinciding with Magic Johnson's "comeback" year, Roberts became the only player in NBA history to be a teammate of both Johnson and Larry Bird. The following year, he signed a one-year contract with the Dallas Mavericks, but was released almost immediately after Don Nelson became General Manager.

== NBA career statistics ==
Legend
GP	Games played	GS	Games started	MPG	Minutes per game
FG%	Field goal percentage	3P%	3-point field goal percentage	FT%	Free throw percentage
RPG	Rebounds per game	APG	Assists per game	SPG	Steals per game
BPG	Blocks per game	PPG	Points per game	**Bold**	Career high
*	Led the league

=== Regular season ===
Year	Team	GP	GS	MPG	FG%	3P%	FT%	RPG	APG	SPG	BPG	PPG
1983–84	San Antonio	79	8	19.4	**.536**	.250	.837	**3.8**	1.2	0.7	**0.5**	7.3
1984–85	San Antonio	22	0	13.9	.449	.000	.763	1.6	1.0	0.5	**0.5**	5.3
1984–85	Utah	52	0	16.8	.513	**1.000**	**.840**	2.9	1.3	0.3	0.2	8.7
1985–86	Utah	58	0	8.1	.443	.500	.770	1.4	0.5	0.1	0.1	3.7
1986–87	Boston	73	11	14.8	.515	.000	.810	2.6	0.8	0.3	0.3	5.5
1987–88	Boston	74	14	13.9	.488	.000	.776	2.2	1.1	0.2	0.2	6.1
1988–89	Milwaukee	71	3	17.6	.486	.214	.806	2.9	0.9	0.5	0.3	5.9
1989–90	Milwaukee	**82***	66	**27.3**	.495	.182	.783	**3.8**	**1.8**	0.7	0.3	10.5
1990–91	Milwaukee	**82***	**82**	25.8	.533	.160	.813	3.4	1.6	**0.8**	0.4	**10.8**
1991–92	Milwaukee	80	63	21.8	.482	.514	.749	3.2	1.5	0.7	**0.5**	9.6
1992–93	Milwaukee	79	5	18.8	.528	.414	.799	3.0	1.5	0.7	0.3	7.6
1994–95	Cleveland	21	0	10.6	.389	.364	.769	1.6	0.4	0.3	0.1	3.8
1995–96	Los Angeles	33	1	9.6	.495	.286	.786	1.4	0.8	0.5	0.1	3.7
1996–97	Dallas	12	0	3.3	.400	.000	.714	0.8	0.0	0.0	0.1	1.8
Career		818	253	18.0	.502	.325	.796	2.8	1.2	0.5	0.3	7.3

=== Playoffs ===
Year	Team	GP	GS	MPG	FG%	3P%	FT%	RPG	APG	SPG	BPG	PPG
1984–85	Utah	10	0	13.0	.442	.000	.800	1.7	0.9	**0.7**	0.3	5.4
1985–86	Utah	4	0	7.8	.467	.000	.889	1.8	0.8	0.0	0.0	5.5
1986–87	Boston	**20**	4	13.3	.508	.000	.705	1.7	0.6	0.3	0.2	4.6
1987–88	Boston	15	0	6.7	.524	.000	.636	1.1	0.2	0.2	0.0	1.9
1988–89	Milwaukee	9	**5**	**38.3**	.490	.000	.850	4.3	2.2	0.6	**0.4**	**14.7**
1989–90	Milwaukee	4	4	19.8	.650	.000	.813	2.0	0.8	0.0	0.3	9.8
1990–91	Milwaukee	3	3	34.3	.457	.000	**1.000**	**5.0**	**2.3**	**0.7**	0.3	11.3
1994–95	Cleveland	1	0	7.0	**.750**	.000	.000	2.0	0.0	0.0	0.0	6.0
1995–96	Los Angeles	1	0	3.0	.000	.000	.000	3.0	0.0	0.0	0.0	0.0
Career		67	16	15.9	.495	.000	.771	2.1	0.9	0.3	0.2	6.1

== Later work ==
After his basketball career, Roberts became an educator in Utah. He worked as a principal for five years, then began teaching sixth grade in 2007.
