= Greg Kite =

American basketball player (born 1961)

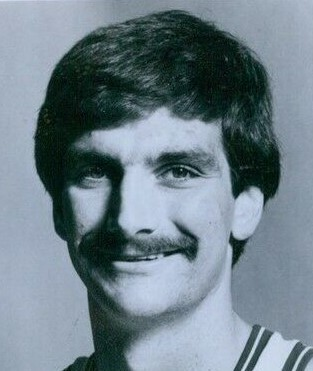

Personal information
- Born: August 5, 1961 (age 65) Houston, Texas, U.S.
- Listed height: 6 ft 11 in (2.11 m)
- Listed weight: 250 lb (113 kg)

Career information
- High school: Madison (Houston, Texas)
- College: BYU (1979–1983)
- NBA draft: 1983: 1st round, 21st overall pick
- Drafted by: Boston Celtics
- Playing career: 1983–1996
- Position: Center
- Number: 50, 32, 34, 40, 54

Career history
- 1983–1988: Boston Celtics
- 1988–1989: Los Angeles Clippers
- 1989: Charlotte Hornets
- 1989–1990: Sacramento Kings
- 1990–1994: Orlando Magic
- 1995: New York Knicks
- 1995: Indiana Pacers
- 1995: Rapid City Thrillers
- 1995–1996: Fort Wayne Fury

Career highlights
- 2× NBA champion (1984, 1986); McDonald's All-American (1979); Second-team Parade All-American (1979)

Career NBA statistics
- Points: 1,717 (2.5 ppg)
- Rebounds: 2,607 (3.8 rpg)
- Assists: 345 (0.5 apg)
- Stats at NBA.com
- Stats at Basketball Reference

Gregory Fuller Kite (born August 5, 1961) is an American former professional basketball player. Kite was a member of two NBA Championship teams with the Boston Celtics in 1984 and 1986. Kite played eleven NBA seasons.

== Early life ==
Kite was the youngest of four siblings with a brother and two sisters. He first played team basketball when he was 10 years old at the Southwest YMCA in Houston, while also playing other sports. He attended Pershing Junior High, where he played basketball in grades seven through nine.

Kite attended Madison High School in Houston, Texas, under Coach Paul Benton. Kite was 6′10” by the time he was 15, and had given up other sports.

Basketball Weekly ranked Madison as high as 5th in the nation in 1979 and 1st in Texas. With a record of 39–0, Madison lost in the state semifinals to Lufkin High School from Lufkin, Texas. Kite averaged 18 points and 15 rebounds as a senior.

Kite was selected to play in the 1979 McDonald's All-American Game, alongside players such as Sam Bowie, Antoine Carr, Quintin Dailey, Sidney Green, Clark Kellogg, Sidney Lowe, John Paxson, Ralph Sampson, Byron Scott, Steve Stipanovich, Isiah Thomas, Dereck Whittenburg, Dominique Wilkins and James Worthy.

== College career ==
Kite was recruited by Duke, Kentucky and UCLA among others. Family connections led to him attending Brigham Young University, where he played for coach Frank Arnold.

Kite was a sophomore on the 1980–1981 BYU team that finished 25–7 under Coach Frank Arnold. Playing alongside future Celtic teammates Danny Ainge and Fred Roberts, Kite averaged 8.3 points, 8.5 rebounds and 1.2 assists as the Cougars defeated Princeton, UCLA and Notre Dame in the 1981 NCAA Division I Basketball Tournament, before losing to Ralph Sampson and Virginia in the East Regional Final. Kite had 12 points and 11 rebounds in the win over UCLA.

Kite averaged 6.4 points and 7.6 rebounds in 112 games over his four-year college career.

== Professional career ==
Kite was selected 21st overall by the Boston Celtics in the 1983 NBA draft. Said Kite about the draft: "That summer the Celtics traded Rick Robey to the Phoenix Suns for Dennis Johnson and a first-round pick. What that did was open up a spot for a backup center. Red Auerbach really wanted to pick Roy Hinson from Rutgers. Hinson was a heck of a player who ended up having some knee problems later on, and Roy had really long arms like Kevin McHale. He could reach four or five inches higher than I could, even though he was only 6′-9”. So Red really wanted him and hoped he would last until the Celtics could pick, but Roy was selected by Cleveland. I was the alternative."

As a Celtic, he won two championship rings in 1984 and 1986, serving as a reserve center behind Hall of Famers Robert Parish, Larry Bird, and Kevin McHale.

On June 7, 1987 in game three of the 1987 NBA Finals, with Robert Parish in foul trouble and Bill Walton ailing, Kite was called upon by Coach KC Jones to match up against Kareem Abdul-Jabbar for 22 minutes. He responded with defense that tired Abdul-Jabbar, and blocked a shot by Magic Johnson. Kite had zero points, nine rebounds, two assists, one block, and five fouls in his 22 minutes and his play helped the Celtics to a 109–103 victory.

"Kite didn't score a point?" Laker Coach Pat Riley asked after the game. "It looked like he had 100."

After the game, Larry Bird said, "I've seen Greg play real well at times. He's got limited offensive ability, but he is a banger and he is probably our hardest worker. He kept Kareem off balance and got a lot of rebounds. His work ethic finally paid off. He stayed with his game and did a real good job."

Kite played five seasons with Boston, until he was waived on February 1, 1988.

“My time in Boston was incredible, unique. I played with Larry, Kevin, Dennis Johnson. I loved New England, made a lot of friends there. It was a great time, great era." Kite recalled. "We went into the 87–88 season and Bird, McHale were getting pretty banged up. They brought in Artis Gilmore and put me on injured reserve, even though I wasn’t injured. You can always have a bad back.”

Kite then played for the Los Angeles Clippers and five other NBA teams, including 12 games with the Charlotte Hornets in that team's inaugural season of 1988–89.

“When I went to the Celtics I wanted to play, but there were four Hall of Famers there. I stuck around after practice to work on my game and there were other veterans on the team who would do that, too." Kite said. “When I left the Celtics, yes, I was able to play more, but when you go from a championship team to a team like the Clippers, who were one of the worst teams back then, you can develop some bad habits. You didn’t see anyone sticking around after practice there.”

With the Sacramento Kings on January 6, 1990, Kite made the only 3-pointer of his career against the Portland Trail Blazers. Kite shot 1 of 6 from three for his career. "I led the league in three-point shooting one year. I was 1-for-1 shooting threes for the Sacramento Kings. So I quit while I was ahead." Kite said of his three.

Kite played for the Orlando Magic between 1990 and 1994. In his first season with the team, he started all 82 games at center and led the Magic with 7.2 rebounds and 1.0 blocked shots per game, both career highs. He served as backup to Shaquille O'Neal in his final two seasons in Orlando. Kite finished the 1992–93 season playing with the Rapid City Thrillers of the Continental Basketball Association (CBA). He was brought back to Orlando on a veterans' minimum contract. Kite finished his NBA career with the Knicks and Pacers in 1995.

Kite played 680 games in eleven NBA seasons, starting 225 of them. He averaged 2.5 points, 2.3 fouls and 3.8 rebounds in 14 minutes per game. Kite played for the Boston Celtics (1983–1988), Los Angeles Clippers (1988–1989), Charlotte Hornets (1989), Sacramento Kings (1989–1990), Orlando Magic (1990–1994), New York Knicks (1995) and the Indiana Pacers (1995).

“With my skills and ability, I was a backup,” Kite said. “I played 12 years and played until I was 35. I wanted it to last longer. It would’ve been great to play my whole career in Boston.”

== Post-playing career ==
Currently residing in Central Florida, Kite is commissioner of the Florida Basketball Association, while also working as a financial adviser.

In 1997, Kite served as an interim assistant basketball coach at his alma mater, Brigham Young University.

== Personal life ==
Kite and his wife Jennifer have 10 adopted children.

== NBA career statistics ==
Legend
GP	Games played	GS	Games started	MPG	Minutes per game
FG%	Field goal percentage	3P%	3-point field goal percentage	FT%	Free throw percentage
RPG	Rebounds per game	APG	Assists per game	SPG	Steals per game
BPG	Blocks per game	PPG	Points per game	**Bold**	Career high
†	Won an NBA championship	*	Led the league

=== Regular season ===
Year	Team	GP	GS	MPG	FG%	3P%	FT%	RPG	APG	SPG	BPG	PPG
1983–84†	Boston	35	1	5.6	.455	–	.313	1.8	.2	.0	.1	1.9
1984–85	Boston	55	4	7.7	.375	–	**.688**	1.6	.3	.1	.2	1.6
1985–86†	Boston	64	2	7.3	.374	.000	.385	2.0	.3	.0	.4	1.3
1986–87	Boston	74	1	10.1	.427	.000	.382	2.3	.4	.2	.6	1.7
1987–88	Boston	13	0	6.6	.391	–	.167	1.8	.2	.2	.6	1.5
1987–88	L. A. Clippers	40	19	24.4	.456	.000	.534	6.0	**1.1**	**.4**	**1.3**	**5.1**
1988–89	L. A. Clippers	58	12	12.6	.405	–	.452	3.3	.5	**.4**	.8	1.9
1988–89	Charlotte	12	12	17.8	**.533**	–	.600	4.4	.6	.3	.7	3.2
1989–90	Sacramento	71	47	21.3	.432	**1.000**	.500	5.3	**1.1**	**.4**	.7	3.2
1990–91	Orlando	**82***	**82***	**27.1**	.491	–	.512	**7.2**	.7	.3	1.0	4.8
1991–92	Orlando	72	44	20.5	.437	.000	.588	5.6	.6	**.4**	.8	3.2
1992–93	Orlando	64	1	10.0	.452	.000	.542	3.0	.2	.2	.2	1.4
1993–94	Orlando	29	0	10.7	.371	–	.364	2.4	.1	.1	.4	1.2
1994–95	New York	2	0	8.0	.000	–	–	2.0	.0	.0	.0	.0
1994–95	Indiana	9	0	6.8	.214	–	.200	2.0	.1	.0	.0	.9
Career		680	225	14.8	.438	.167	.486	3.8	.5	.2	.6	2.5

=== Playoffs ===
Year	Team	GP	GS	MPG	FG%	3P%	FT%	RPG	APG	SPG	BPG	PPG
1984†	Boston	11		3.5	.125	–	.833	.8	.3	.0	.1	.6
1985	Boston	9	0	7.0	.417	–	.500	1.8	.3	.1	.0	1.2
1986†	Boston	13	0	6.0	**.700**	–	.571	1.5	.2	**.2**	.3	**1.4**
1987	Boston	**20**	**1**	**8.6**	.350	–	.429	**2.3**	**.4**	.1	**.4**	.9
1995	Indiana	8	0	3.3	.333	–	**1.000**	.9	.0	.1	.0	.5
Career		61	1	6.2	.396	–	.625	1.6	.3	.1	.2	.9
