= Steve Cleveland =

American basketball player-coach

Biographical details
- Born: February 4, 1952 (age 74); Los Angeles County, California, U.S.

Playing career
- 1970–1971, 1973–1974: Fresno CC
- 1974–1976: UC Irvine
- Position: Forward

Coaching career (HC unless noted)
- 1980–1990: Clovis West HS
- 1990–1997: Fresno CC
- 1997–2005: BYU
- 2005–2011: Fresno State

Head coaching record
- Overall: 230–206 (.528) (college); 157–77 (.671) (junior college); 180–70 (.720) (high school)
- Tournaments: 0–3 (NCAA); 3–3 (NIT); 9–7 (CCCAA)

Accomplishments and honors

Championships
- MWC tournament (2001); 2 MWC regular season (2001, 2003); CVC regular season (1997)

Awards
- MWC Coach of the Year (2003)

Steve is a nickname for "Stephen". For the president, see Stephen Cleveland.

Steven Cornell Cleveland (born February 4, 1952) is an American former college basketball coach. He was the men's basketball head coach at Fresno City College, BYU, and Fresno State.

== Early life and education ==
Cleveland was born in Los Angeles County and raised in Fresno, California. He attended Herbert Hoover High School in Fresno, then began his college basketball career at Fresno City College before going on a mission for the Church of Jesus Christ of Latter-day Saints to England from 1971 to 1973. Cleveland returned to Fresno City College in the 1973–74 season, after which he was named the team's Most Outstanding Player and transferred to UC Irvine. At UC Irvine, Cleveland played at forward. He averaged 8.8 points and 4.8 rebounds as a junior in 1974–75 and 15.0 points and 5.5 rebounds as a senior in 1975–76. Cleveland graduated from UC Irvine with a bachelor's degree in social science in 1976 and later completed a master's in education administration from Fresno Pacific University in 1979.

== Coaching career ==
=== High school and junior college ===
From 1980 to 1990, Cleveland was varsity boys' basketball head coach at Clovis West High School and went 180–70 in those ten seasons. At Clovis West, Cleveland also taught U.S. government and economics. Cleveland returned to Fresno City College to be men's basketball head coach. From 1990 to 1997, Cleveland went 157–77 with a Central Valley Conference championship in 1997 and CCCAA Tournament appearances every year. Among players he coached at Fresno City were Rafer Alston, who would go on to play in the NBA.

=== BYU ===
Cleveland moved up to the major college level in 1997 as head coach at BYU. He inherited a team that had just suffered a 1–25 season, the worst in school history.

In his first season, BYU finished 9–21 in 1997–98. BYU improved to 22–11 in 1999–2000, BYU's first season in the Mountain West Conference (MW) and made the NIT quarterfinals. The following season, BYU won the MW Tournament after splitting the regular season title and made the NCAA tournament. BYU then made the 2002 NIT and NCAA Tournaments of 2003 and 2004 and again was MW co-champion in 2003. The MW also awarded Cleveland with Coach of the Year honors in 2003. BYU fell to 9–21 in 2004–05, Cleveland's final season.

=== Fresno State ===
On April 9, 2005, Fresno State hired Cleveland as men's basketball head coach. Cleveland's hiring followed the resignation of previous head coach Ray Lopes. In 2006, due to recruiting violations under Lopes's watch, the NCAA issued a show-cause penalty to Lopes and placed Fresno State men's basketball on five years of probation. Also, Cleveland inherited a program whose Academic Progress Rate (APR) was 611, the worst in the nation.

Cleveland went 92–98 in six seasons at Fresno State. In his first two seasons, Fresno State finished 8–8 and 10–6 in Western Athletic Conference (WAC) play, and Fresno State's only postseason appearance in his tenure was in the NIT. The 2006–07 team also featured Dominic McGuire, a transfer from Cal who became a second-round 2007 NBA draft pick. The team APR also improved to 928 by the end of his tenure.

== Post-coaching career ==
On March 17, 2011, Cleveland stepped down from coaching to assume an administrative post in the Fresno State athletic department. Later that year, Cleveland took a position as an analyst for BYUtv Sports.

In 2013, he began a three-year term as a mission president for the Church of Jesus Christ of Latter-day Saints in the Indiana Indianapolis Mission.

== Head coaching record ==
=== Junior college ===
Record table
Season	Team	Overall	Conference	Standing	Postseason
Fresno City Rams (Central Valley Conference) (1990–1997)
1990–91	Fresno City	19–14	4–8	5th	CCCAA Regional
1991–92	Fresno City	24–10	8–4	2nd	CCCAA Regional
1992–93	Fresno City	17–15	5–7	4th	CCCAA Regional
1993–94	Fresno City	18–13	7–5	4th	CCCAA Regional
1994–95	Fresno City	26–11	9–5	4th	CCCAA Elite Eight
1995–96	Fresno City	22–10	9–5	2nd	CCCAA Regional
1996–97	Fresno City	31–4	13–1	1st	CCCAA Final Four
Fresno City:		157–77 (.671)	55–35 (.611)		
Total:		157–77 (.671)			
National champion Postseason invitational champion Conference regular season champion Conference regular season and conference tournament champion Division regular season champion Division regular season and conference tournament champion Conference tournament champion

=== College ===
Record table
Season	Team	Overall	Conference	Standing	Postseason
BYU Cougars (Western Athletic Conference) (1997–1999)
1997–98	BYU	9–21	4–10	6th (Mountain)	
1998–99	BYU	12–16	6–8	5th (Pacific)	
BYU Cougars (Mountain West Conference) (1999–2005)
1999–00	BYU	22–11	7–7	6th	NIT Quarterfinals
2000–01	BYU	24–9	10–4	T–1st	NCAA Division I First Round
2001–02	BYU	18–12	7–7	T–4th	NIT Second Round
2002–03	BYU	23–9	11–3	T–1st	NCAA Division I First Round
2003–04	BYU	21–9	10–4	2nd	NCAA Division I First Round
2004–05	BYU	9–21	3–11	T–7th	
BYU:		138–108 (.561)	58–54 (.518)		
Fresno State Bulldogs (Western Athletic Conference) (2005–2011)
2005–06	Fresno State	15–13	8–8	6th	
2006–07	Fresno State	22–10	10–6	3rd	NIT First Round
2007–08	Fresno State	13–19	5–11	T–6th	
2008–09	Fresno State	13–21	3–13	9th	
2009–10	Fresno State	15–18	7–9	5th	
2010–11	Fresno State	14–17	6–10	7th	
Fresno State:		92–98 (.484)	39–57 (.406)		
Total:		230–206 (.528)			
National champion Postseason invitational champion Conference regular season champion Conference regular season and conference tournament champion Division regular season champion Division regular season and conference tournament champion Conference tournament champion
