= Roger Reid (basketball) =

American basketball coach (born 1946)

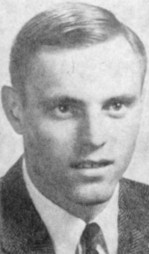
- Reid, circa 1968

Biographical details
- Born: August 3, 1946 (age 80)

Coaching career (HC unless noted)
- 1971–1974: Payson HS (UT)
- 1974–1978: Clearfield (UT)
- 1978–1989: BYU (asst.)
- 1989–1996: BYU
- 1998–2003: Phoenix Suns (asst.)
- 2003–2005: Hangzhou Horses
- 2005–2007: Snow CC
- 2007–2012: Southern Utah

Head coaching record
- Overall: 206–174 (.542) (college); 33–28 (.541) (junior college)
- Tournaments: 2–5 (NCAA Division I); 1–1 (NIT)

Accomplishments and honors

Championships
- 3 WAC regular season (1990, 1992, 1993); 2 WAC tournament (1991, 1992); SWAC regular season (2007)

Awards
- 2× WAC Coach of the Year (1990, 1992)

Roger L. Reid (born August 3, 1946) is an American former college basketball coach who most recently guided the Southern Utah University (SUU) men's basketball team. He served as head coach at Brigham Young University (BYU) from 1989 to 1996 and assistant coach for the NBA's Phoenix Suns. He has also coached at the high school, junior college and international levels. In addition, he played for former NBA coach Dick Motta at Weber State University.

== High school and college ==
Reid attended Springville High School in Springville, Utah and was an all-state performer in both baseball and basketball. He went on to play both sports at the College of Eastern Utah and was recognized as a junior college All-American in baseball. Reid concluded his collegiate playing days at Weber State earning all conference honors in baseball both seasons he played and was also a key player for coach Dick Motta's Big Sky Conference championship team in basketball.

== Minor League Baseball ==
After finishing college, Reid was drafted and played professionally, as a shortstop, for both the Atlanta Braves and Chicago White Sox minor league farm systems over four seasons (eventually playing at the AAA level).

== Coaching career ==
=== High school ===
In 1971, Reid embarked on his basketball coaching career at Payson High School in Utah. He compiled a 50–26 in three seasons before moving on to Clearfield High School in 1974. He finished coaching at the northern Utah high school with a 60–24 record.

=== BYU ===
Reid became a member of Frank Arnold's staff at BYU in 1978 and stayed on as an assistant under LaDell Andersen when he replaced Arnold. He was named as BYU head coach in 1989. His BYU teams were consistent winners and Reid led them to a 152–77 (.667) record. BYU also made five NCAA Tournament appearances, won three conference regular season titles and two conference tournament championships during his tenure.

His success did not prevent him from being disliked by some BYU fans and players. Reid's sons, Randy and Robbie (both heavily recruited by other schools), decided to play for their father at BYU. Some disgruntled alumni were not pleased that the Reids were playing for the Cougars, and some insinuated that Reid's decision to play his sons amounted to nepotism. By 1996, Reid's coaching future at BYU was in doubt. Some school administrators strongly suggested that getting Chris Burgess—a highly touted player from Irvine, California—to play for the Cougars, could save Reid's job. Burgess was a member of the Church of Jesus Christ of Latter-day Saints, and his father had played for BYU, which is owned by the Church. In the end, Burgess told Reid that he was going to play for Duke. Upon hearing this, Reid allegedly told him that he had let down all members of the LDS church. Reid was dismissed as BYU head coach on December 17, 1996, shortly after the recruiting incident. Reid has stated since then that his remarks to Burgess were taken out of context. BYU had started the season 1–7 after being decimated by injuries; assistant Tony Ingle replaced Reid for the rest of what would become a 1–25 season—the worst in school history. Reid's comments to Burgess have frequently been cited by the media and many associated with BYU as the primary reason for Reid's dismissal. While they were a factor in the decision, athletic director Rondo Fehlberg primarily cited concerns about sluggish attendance; despite recent conference success, his team was struggling to draw half-capacity crowds for even the most significant home games in the 22,700-seat Marriott Center. Other factors included the old charges of nepotism, as well as the slow start to the 1996–97 season.

Reid's son, Robbie, did not return to BYU after serving a two-year LDS church mission to Greece. He attended the University of Michigan instead and became a two-year starter for the Wolverines to close out his college basketball career.

=== Phoenix Suns ===
Reid was hired by former BYU and NBA player Danny Ainge to be an assistant coach for the Phoenix Suns. During his five years with the Suns they made two playoff appearances.

=== Hangzhou Horses ===
Reid coached the Hangzhou Horses in China's top professional league for two years.

=== Snow College ===
On May 9, 2005, Reid was hired as the head basketball coach for the Snow College Badgers. His teams at Snow compiled an overall record of 33–28 in two seasons including a 23–8 mark for the 2006–2007 season.

=== Southern Utah ===
On March 14, 2007, SUU President Michael Benson announced the hiring of Roger Reid to replace Coach Bill Evans. Reid coached for five seasons, then retired from coaching on March 8, 2012.

Reid finished his run at Southern Utah with a 54–97 record.

== Head coaching record ==
=== College ===
Record table
Season	Team	Overall	Conference	Standing	Postseason
BYU Cougars (Western Athletic Conference) (1989–1997)
1989–90	BYU	21–9	11–5	T–1st	NCAA Division I First Round
1990–91	BYU	21–13	11–5	2nd	NCAA Division I Second Round
1991–92	BYU	25–7	12–4	T–1st	NCAA Division I First Round
1992–93	BYU	25–9	15–3	T–1st	NCAA Division I Second Round
1993–94	BYU	22–10	12–6	3rd	NIT Second Round
1994–95	BYU	22–10	13–5	T–2nd	NCAA Division I First Round
1995–96	BYU	15–13	9–9	5th	
1996–97	BYU	1–6			
BYU:		152–77 (.664)	83–37 (.692)		
Southern Utah Thunderbirds (Summit League) (2007–2012)
2007–08	Southern Utah	11–19	9–9	T–5th	
2008–09	Southern Utah	11–20	8–10	T–5th	
2009–10	Southern Utah	7–22	3–15	T–9th	
2010–11	Southern Utah	11–19	7–11	8th	
2011–12	Southern Utah	14–17	8–10	6th	
Southern Utah:		54–97 (.358)	35–55 (.389)		
Total:		206–174 (.542)			
National champion Postseason invitational champion Conference regular season champion Conference regular season and conference tournament champion Division regular season champion Division regular season and conference tournament champion Conference tournament champion

=== Junior College ===
Record table
Season	Team	Overall	Conference	Standing	Postseason
Snow College Badgers (Scenic West Athletic Conference) (2005–2007)
2005–06	Snow College	10–20	7–11	6th	
2006–07	Snow College	23–8	15–5	T–1st	
Snow College:		33–28 (.541)	22–16 (.579)		
Total:		33–28 (.541)			
National champion Postseason invitational champion Conference regular season champion Conference regular season and conference tournament champion Division regular season champion Division regular season and conference tournament champion Conference tournament champion
