= 1950–51 Kansas State Wildcats men's basketball team =

American college basketball season

1950–51 Kansas State Wildcats men's basketball

NCAA tournament, Runner-up Big Seven Champions

National Championship Game, L 58-68 vs. Kentucky
- Conference: Big Seven Conference

Ranking
- Coaches: No. 3
- AP: No. 4
- Record: 25–4 (11–1 Big Seven)
- Head coach: Jack Gardner (8th season)
- Assistant coach: Tex Winter (4th season)
- Home arena: Ahearn Field House

1950–51 Big Seven Conference men's basketball standings
	Conf.				Overall
Team	W		L	PCT	W		L	PCT
No. 4 Kansas State	11	–	1	.917	25	–	4	.862
Kansas	8	–	4	.667	16	–	8	.667
Missouri	8	–	4	.667	16	–	8	.667
Oklahoma	6	–	6	.500	14	–	10	.583
Nebraska	4	–	8	.333	9	–	14	.391
Iowa State	3	–	9	.250	9	–	12	.429
Colorado	2	–	10	.167	4	–	20	.167
Rankings from AP Poll

The 1950–51 Kansas State Wildcats men's basketball team represented Kansas State University as a member of the Big Seven Conference during the 1950–51 NCAA men's basketball season. The head coach was Jack Gardner, who was in his eighth season at the helm. The Wildcats reached the Final Four of the NCAA tournament, losing to Kentucky in the national championship game, and finished with a record of 25–4 (11–1 Big 7).

The team played its home games at Ahearn Field House in Manhattan, Kansas.

== Roster ==
1950–51 Kansas State Wildcats men's basketball team
Players
Coaches

Pos.	#	Name	Height	Weight	Year	Previous school	Hometown
G/F	22	Ernie Barrett	6 ft 3 in (1.91 m)	180 lb (82 kg)	Sr	Wellington HS	Wellington, Kansas
F/C	25	Lew Hitch	6 ft 8 in (2.03 m)	200 lb (91 kg)	Sr		Griggsville, Illinois
G/F		Jack Stone	6 ft 3 in (1.91 m)	190 lb (86 kg)	Sr	University HS	Los Angeles, California

Head coach

- Jack Gardner (USC)

Assistant coach(es)

- Tex Winter (USC)

Legend

- (C) Team captain
- (S) Suspended
- (I) Ineligible
- (W) Walk-on
- Injured
- Current redshirt

Roster

== Schedule and results ==
Date time, TV	Rank^{#}	Opponent^{#}	Result	Record	Site city, state
Regular season
Dec 2, 1950*		at Long Island University	L 59–60	0–1	Madison Square Garden; New York, New York
Dec 4, 1950*		at Ohio State	W 68–51	1–1	Ohio State Men's Gym; Columbus, Ohio
Dec 6, 1950*		at Purdue	W 60–44	2–1	Lambert Fieldhouse; West Lafayette, Indiana
Dec 9, 1950*		Utah State	W 66–56	3–1	Ahearn Field House; Manhattan, Kansas
Dec 12, 1950*		Wichita	W 73–42	4–1	Ahearn Field House; Manhattan, Kansas
Dec 16, 1950*		Indiana	L 52–58 ^{OT}	4–2	Ahearn Field House; Manhattan, Kansas
Dec 18, 1950*		Wisconsin	W 77–58	5–2	Ahearn Field House; Manhattan, Kansas
Dec 21, 1950*	No. 20	Springfield (MO)	W 82–59	6–2	Ahearn Field House; Manhattan, Kansas
Dec 28, 1950*		Oklahoma; Big Seven Holiday Tournament	W 55–53	7–2	Municipal Auditorium; Kansas City, Missouri
Dec 29, 1950*		vs. Nebraska; Big Seven Holiday Tournament	W 72–53	8–2	Municipal Auditorium; Kansas City, Missouri
Dec 30, 1950*		vs. Minnesota; Big Seven Holiday Tournament	W 70–62	9–2	Municipal Auditorium; Kansas City, Missouri
Jan 6, 1951	No. 9	at Missouri	W 60–43	10–2 (1–0)	Brewer Fieldhouse; Columbia, Missouri
Jan 13, 1951	No. 9	Iowa State	W 98–58	11–2 (2–0)	Ahearn Field House; Manhattan, Kansas
Jan 15, 1951	No. 10	at Kansas	W 47–43	12–2 (3–0)	Hoch Auditorium; Lawrence, Kansas
Jan 27, 1951	No. 9	Colorado	W 63–42	13–2 (4–0)	Ahearn Field House; Manhattan, Kansas
Jan 31, 1951*	No. 7	No. 4 Long Island University	W 85–65	14–2	Ahearn Field House (14,028); Manhattan, Kansas
Feb 3, 1951	No. 7	at Colorado	W 60–45	15–2 (5–0)	Balch Fieldhouse; Boulder, Colorado
Feb 5, 1951	No. 7	at Nebraska	W 79–50	16–2 (6–0)	Nebraska Coliseum; Lincoln, Nebraska
Feb 10, 1951	No. 4	Missouri	W 75–64	17–2 (7–0)	Ahearn Field House; Manhattan, Kansas
Feb 17, 1951	No. 3	at Oklahoma	L 46–49	17–3 (7–1)	McCasland Field House; Norman, Oklahoma
Feb 24, 1951	No. 5	Kansas	W 65–51	18–3 (8–1)	Ahearn Field House; Manhattan, Kansas
Feb 26, 1951	No. 4	Nebraska	W 74–48	19–3 (9–1)	Ahearn Field House; Manhattan, Kansas
Mar 3, 1951	No. 4	at Iowa State	W 81–47	20–3 (10–1)	Iowa State Armory; Ames, Iowa
Mar 5, 1951	No. 4	Oklahoma	W 87–48	21–3 (11–1)	Ahearn Field House; Manhattan, Kansas
Mar 14, 1951*	No. 4	No. 5 Illinois	W 91–72	22–3	Ahearn Field House; Manhattan, Kansas
NCAA Tournament
Mar 21, 1951*	No. 4	vs. No. 12 Arizona; NCAA First Round	W 61–59	23–3	Municipal Auditorium; Kansas City, Missouri
Mar 23, 1951*	No. 4	vs. No. 11 Brigham Young; NCAA Regional Semifinal	W 64–54	24–3	Municipal Auditorium; Kansas City, Missouri
Mar 24, 1951*	No. 4	vs. No. 2 Oklahoma A&M; NCAA Regional Final	W 68–44	25–3	Municipal Auditorium; Kansas City, Missouri
Mar 27, 1951*	No. 4	vs. No. 1 Kentucky; NCAA National Championship	L 58–68	25–4	Williams Arena; Minneapolis, Minnesota
*Non-conference game. ^{#}Rankings from AP Poll. (#) Tournament seedings in parentheses. W=West.

== Team players drafted into the NBA ==
Round	Pick	Player	NBA club
1	7	Ernie Barrett	Boston Celtics
2	10	Jack Stone	Baltimore Bullets
2	19	Lew Hitch	Minneapolis Lakers
