= 1950–51 Kansas Jayhawks men's basketball team =

American college basketball season

1950–51 Kansas Jayhawks men's basketball
- Conference: Big Eight Conference|Big Seven Conference
- Record: 16–8 (8–4 Big 7)
- Head coach: Phog Allen (34th season)
- Assistant coach: Dick Harp (2nd season)
- Captain: Jerry Waugh
- Home arena: Hoch Auditorium

1950–51 Big Seven Conference men's basketball standings
| | Conf. | | | | Overall |
| Team | W | | L | PCT | W | | L | PCT |
|---|---|---|---|---|---|---|---|---|
| No. 4 Kansas State | 11 | – | 1 | .917 | 25 | – | 4 | .862 |
| Kansas | 8 | – | 4 | .667 | 16 | – | 8 | .667 |
| Missouri | 8 | – | 4 | .667 | 16 | – | 8 | .667 |
| Oklahoma | 6 | – | 6 | .500 | 14 | – | 10 | .583 |
| Nebraska | 4 | – | 8 | .333 | 9 | – | 14 | .391 |
| Iowa State | 3 | – | 9 | .250 | 9 | – | 12 | .429 |
| Colorado | 2 | – | 10 | .167 | 4 | – | 20 | .167 |
Rankings from AP Poll

The 1950–51 Kansas Jayhawks men's basketball team represented the University of Kansas during the 1950–51 college men's basketball season. The Jayhawks were coached by Phog Allen in his 34th year of his second tenure and 36th overall. On December 16, Allen coached against one of his former players, Adolph Rupp, for the first time. Rupp was the coach at Kentucky. The Jayhawks finished the season 8–4 in the Big Seven Conference, finishing 2nd in the conference, and 16–8 overall. They were not selected to the 1951 NCAA Tournament. One notable player on the team was Dean Smith, who would later go on to a Hall of Fame coaching career at North Carolina.

== Roster ==
- Clyde Lovellette
- Ben Kenney
- Bill Lienhard
- Bill Hougland
- Jerry Waugh
- Charlie Hoag
- Dale Engel
- Sonny Enns
- Dean Kelley
- Clinton Bull
- John Keller
- Bill Schaake
- Dean Wells
- Ken Buller
- Wally Beck
- Harold Lowe
- Jack Rodgers
- Dean Smith
- Aubrey Linville
- Mark Rivard
- Don Woodson

== Schedule ==
| Date time, TV | Rank^{#} | Opponent^{#} | Result | Record | Site city, state |
|---|---|---|---|---|---|
| December 4* | | Creighton | W 51–35 | 1-0 | Hoch Auditorium; Lawrence, KS |
| December 6* | | Utah State | W 56–38 | 2-0 | Hoch Auditorium; Lawrence, KS |
| December 9* | | at Saint Joseph's | W 60–41 | 3-0 | Convention Hall; Philadelphia, PA |
| December 12* | | at St. John's | W 52–51 | 4-0 | Madison Square Garden (III); New York, NY |
| December 16* | | at Kentucky | L 39–68 | 4-1 | Memorial Coliseum; Lexington, KY |
| December 19* | No. 11 | Springfield (MA) | W 78–52 | 5-1 | Hoch Auditorium; Lawrence, KS |
| December 27 | No. 10 | vs. Iowa State | W 75–51 | 6-1 | Municipal Auditorium; Kansas City, MO |
| December 29* | No. 10 | vs. Minnesota | L 51–62 | 6-2 | Municipal Auditorium; Kansas City, MO |
| December 30 | No. 10 | vs. Nebraska | W 63–47 | 7-2 | Municipal Auditorium; Kansas City, MO |
| January 5 | No. 20 | Nebraska | W 66–41 | 8-2 (1-0) | Hoch Auditorium; Lawrence, KS |
| January 8 | No. 20 | Missouri | W 61–46 | 9-2 (2-0) | Hoch Auditorium; Lawrence, KS |
| January 11 | No. 17 | Colorado | W 54–48 | 10-2 (3-0) | Hoch Auditorium; Lawrence, KS |
| January 15 | No. 17 | No. 9 Kansas State; Sunflower Showdown | L 43–47 | 10-3 (3-1) | Hoch Auditorium; Lawrence, KS |
| January 27 | | at No. 18 Oklahoma | W 58–52 | 11-3 (4-1) | Field House; Norman, OK |
| February 3* | No. 17 | at Northwestern | L 53–54 | 11-4 | Chicago Stadium; Chicago, IL |
| February 5* | No. 17 | Oklahoma A&M | L 41–46 | 11-5 | Hoch Auditorium; Lawrence, KS |
| February 10 | No. 20 | at Nebraska | W 61–52 | 12-5 (5-1) | Nebraska Coliseum; Lincoln, NE |
| February 12 | No. 20 | at Missouri; Border War | L 38–39 | 12-6 (5-2) | Brewer Fieldhouse; Columbia, MO |
| February 17 | | at Iowa State | W 56–54 | 13-6 (6-2) | The Armory; Ames, IA |
| February 19 | | Oklahoma | L 59–61 | 13-7 (6-3) | Hoch Auditorium; Lawrence, KS |
| February 24 | | at No. 5 Kansas State; Sunflower Showdown | L 51–65 | 13-8 (6-4) | Nichols Hall; Manhattan, KS |
| February 26 | | Colorado | W 58–56 | 14-8 (7-4) | Balch Fieldhouse; Boulder, CO |
| March 7 | | Iowa State | W 70–64 | 15-8 (8-4) | Hoch Auditorium; Lawrence, KS |
| March 10* | | at No. 2 Oklahoma A&M | W 37–27 | 15-8 | Gallagher-Iba Arena; Stillwater, OK |
*Non-conference game. ^{#}Rankings from AP Poll. (#) Tournament seedings in parentheses.
