= 1951 SEC men's basketball tournament =

- Classification: Division I
- Season: 1950–51
- Teams: 12
- Site: Jefferson County Armory; Louisville, Kentucky
- Champions: Vanderbilt (1st title)
- Winning coach: Bob Polk (1st title)
- MVP: None

1950–51 Southeastern Conference men's basketball standings
	Conf.				Overall
Team	W		L	PCT	W		L	PCT
No. 1 Kentucky	14	–	0	1.000	32	–	2	.941
Vanderbilt †	10	–	4	.714	19	–	8	.704
Alabama	10	–	4	.714	15	–	8	.652
Tulane	8	–	6	.571	12	–	12	.500
Auburn	6	–	8	.429	12	–	10	.545
Georgia	6	–	8	.429	13	–	11	.542
Florida	6	–	8	.429	11	–	12	.478
LSU	6	–	8	.429	10	–	14	.417
Georgia Tech	6	–	8	.429	8	–	19	.296
Ole Miss	5	–	9	.357	12	–	12	.500
Tennessee	5	–	9	.357	10	–	13	.435
Mississippi State	2	–	12	.143	3	–	16	.158
† 1951 SEC Tournament winner Rankings from AP Poll

The 1951 SEC men's basketball tournament took place March 1–3, 1951 in Louisville, Kentucky at the Jefferson County Armory. It was the eighteenth SEC tournament.

The Vanderbilt Commodores won the tournament championship game by beating the Kentucky Wildcats, 61–57. The Commodores season came to a close after the win, while Kentucky would go on to win the 1951 NCAA tournament.

Starting in 1951, the SEC played a round robin schedule and awarded its conference championship to the team with the best regular season record. The winner of the SEC tournament was awarded the title of tournament champion and the conference's bid to the NCAA tournament.

== Bracket ==
First Round; March 1
Vanderbilt	88
Tennessee	52
Ole Miss	44
Alabama	42
Tulane	66
Florida	62
#1 Kentucky	92
Mississippi State	70

Second Round; March 2
Georgia	60
Vanderbilt	70
LSU	62
Ole Miss	57
Georgia Tech	63^{OT}
Tulane	61
Auburn	54
#1 Kentucky	84

Semifinals; March 3
Vanderbilt	75
LSU	63
Georgia Tech	56
#1 Kentucky	82

Championship; March 3
Vanderbilt	61
#1 Kentucky	57
