= 1950–51 Illinois Fighting Illini men's basketball team =

American college basketball season

1950–51 Illinois Fighting Illini men's basketball

Big Ten conference champions

NCAA men's Division I tournament, Final Four
- Conference: Big Ten Conference

Ranking
- Coaches: No. 4
- AP: No. 5
- Record: 22–5 (13-1 Big Ten)
- Head coach: Harry Combes (4th season)
- Assistant coaches: Howie Braun (14th season); Cliff Fulton (1st season)
- MVP: Don Sunderlage
- Captain: Don Sunderlage
- Home arena: Huff Hall

1950–51 Big Ten Conference men's basketball standings
	Conf.				Overall
Team	W		L	PCT	W		L	PCT
No. 5 Illinois	13	–	1	.929	22	–	5	.815
No. 7 Indiana	12	–	2	.857	19	–	3	.864
Iowa	9	–	5	.643	15	–	7	.682
Minnesota	7	–	7	.500	13	–	9	.591
Northwestern	7	–	7	.500	12	–	10	.545
Wisconsin	7	–	7	.500	10	–	12	.455
Michigan State	5	–	9	.357	10	–	11	.476
Purdue	4	–	10	.286	8	–	14	.364
Michigan	3	–	11	.214	7	–	15	.318
Ohio State	3	–	11	.214	6	–	16	.273
Rankings from AP Poll

The 1950–51 Illinois Fighting Illini men’s basketball team represented the University of Illinois.

== Regular season ==
A 13 win conference season marked only the second time since 1942 that the Fighting Illini men's basketball team had completed that feat. The only time they finished with a better conference record was 1943, where they completed the season with a perfect 12-0 record.

Head coach Harry Combes had guided his team to a Big Ten championship, a third-place finish in the 1951 NCAA Division I men's basketball tournament and a final AP ranking of No. 5 in the nation. This was Combes 2nd Big Ten Championship as well as his 2nd third-place finish in the NCAA tournament within his first 4 years as head coach.

The 1950-51 team compiled an overall record of 22 wins and 5 losses with a conference record of 13 wins and 1 loss. The season featured a rematch with Kentucky, which had downed the Illini in the national semifinals in 1949. Illinois beat Columbia, 79-71, and North Carolina State, 84-70, to get to the national semifinals and a rematch with the Wildcats. In a heart-breaking loss, Kentucky nipped Illinois, 76-74, on a shot by Wildcat sub Shelby Linville with 12 seconds remaining in the game. The Illini collected third place nationally by beating Oklahoma A&M, 61-46, in Minneapolis.

The starting lineup included captain Donald Sunderlage and Theodore Beach as forwards, Rodney Fletcher and Irving Bemoras at guard and Robert Peterson and Mack Follmer rotating at the center position.

=== Roster ===
1950–51 Illinois Fighting Illini men's basketball team
Players
Coaches

Pos.	#	Name	Height	Weight	Year	Previous school	Hometown
F	8	Theodore Beach	6 ft 1 in (1.85 m)	165 lb (75 kg)	Sr	Champaign Central High School	Champaign, Illinois
F	11	Don Sunderlage (C)	6 ft 1 in (1.85 m)	180 lb (82 kg)	Sr	Elgin High School	Elgin, Illinois
G	19	James Bredar	5 ft 11 in (1.8 m)	167 lb (76 kg)	So	Salem High School	Salem, Illinois
F	24	Ed Makovsky	6 ft 5 in (1.96 m)	194 lb (88 kg)	Fr	Morton High School	Cicero, Illinois
C	25	Robert Peterson	6 ft 8 in (2.03 m)	235 lb (107 kg)	So	Elgin High School	Wayne, Illinois
G	26	Irving Bemoras	6 ft 3.5 in (1.92 m)	185 lb (84 kg)	So	Marshall High School	Chicago, Illinois
C	27	Mack Follmer	6 ft 4 in (1.93 m)	200 lb (91 kg)	Jr	Forrest High School	Forrest, Illinois
F	29	Max Baumgardner	6 ft 3 in (1.91 m)	175 lb (79 kg)	So	Sterling High School	Sterling, Illinois
F	33	Clive Follmer	6 ft 4 in (1.93 m)	195 lb (88 kg)	So	Forrest High School	Forrest, Illinois
G	34	Seymour Gantman	5 ft 7 in (1.7 m)	165 lb (75 kg)	Jr	Marshall High School	Chicago, Illinois
G	35	Ren Alde	6 ft 2 in (1.88 m)	180 lb (82 kg)	Jr	Pana High School	Pana, Illinois
G	37	Rod Fletcher	6 ft 4 in (1.93 m)	194 lb (88 kg)	Jr	Champaign Central High School	Champaign, Illinois
G	38	Herb Gerecke	6 ft 1 in (1.85 m)	180 lb (82 kg)	Jr	Pekin High School	Pekin, Illinois
F	41	Max Hooper	6 ft 5 in (1.96 m)	200 lb (91 kg)	Fr	Mt. Vernon High School	Mt. Vernon, Illinois
G	47	Dick Christiansen	6 ft 3.5 in (1.92 m)	180 lb (82 kg)	Jr	New Trier High School	Winnetka, Illinois
G	48	James Schuldt	6 ft 0 in (1.83 m)	195 lb (88 kg)	So	Dundee Community High School	Dundee, Illinois
		John Marks	—	—	Sr	Edwardsville High School	Edwardsville, Illinois
		Richard Ems	—	—	Jr	Fisher High School	Fisher, Illinois
		James Hoffman	—	—	Fr
		George Shapland	—	—	Fr
		Andy Toth	—	—	Fr

Head coach

- Harry Combes (University of Illinois) (4th year)

Assistant coach(es)

- Howie Braun (University of Illinois) (14th year)
- Cliff Fulton (University of Illinois) (1st year)

Legend

- (C) Team captain
- (S) Suspended
- (I) Ineligible
- (W) Walk-on
- Injured
- Current redshirt

Roster

== Schedule ==
Date time, TV	Rank^{#}	Opponent^{#}	Result	Record	Site (attendance) city, state
Non-Conference regular season
12/4/1950*		Marquette	W 66–47	1-0	Huff Hall (6,532); Champaign, IL
12/8/1950*		Oregon State	W 74–51	2-0	Huff Hall (6,400); Champaign, IL
12/9/1950*		at Toledo	L 54–68	2-1	The Field House (6,300); Toledo, OH
12/16/1950*		at DePaul	W 69–68	3-1	Chicago Stadium (12,000); Chicago, IL
12/20/1950*		Washington State	W 71–48	4-1	Huff Hall (2,575); Champaign, IL
12/22/1950*		Pennsylvania	W 75–65	5-1	Huff Hall (2,411); Champaign, IL
12/28/1950*	No. 20	DePaul	L 65–68	5-2	Huff Hall (5,942); Champaign, IL
12/29/1950*	No. 20	Butler	W 88–52	6-2	Huff Hall (2,921); Champaign, IL
Big Ten regular season
1/1/1951	No. 20	at Wisconsin	W 71–69 ^{OT}	7-2 (1-0)	Wisconsin Field House (12,500); Madison, WI
1/6/1951		Minnesota	W 70–62	8-2 (2-0)	Huff Hall (6,905); Champaign, IL
1/8/1951		at Iowa; Rivalry	L 62–83	9-2 (3-0)	Iowa Field House (13,732); Iowa City, IA
1/13/1951	No. 14	Michigan	W 68–47	10-2 (4-0)	Huff Hall (6,905); Champaign, IL
1/15/1951	No. 14	at No. 6 Indiana; Rivalry	L 53–64	10-3 (4-1)	The Fieldhouse (10,283); Bloomington, IN
1/20/1951	No. 14	Iowa; Rivalry	W 69–53	11-3 (5-1)	Huff Hall (6,905); Champaign, IL
2/5/1951	No. 14	at Purdue	W 85–76	12-3 (6-1)	Lambert Fieldhouse (10,000); West Lafayette, IN
2/10/1951	No. 16	Wisconsin	W 63–52	13-3 (7-1)	Huff Hall (6,905); Champaign, IL
2/12/1951	No. 16	Ohio State	W 79–59	14-3 (8-1)	Huff Hall (6,905); Champaign, IL
2/17/1951	No. 11	Purdue	W 70–65	15-3 (9-1)	Huff Hall (6,905); Champaign, IL
2/19/1951	No. 11	No. 6 Indiana; Rivalry	W 71–65	16-3 (10-1)	Huff Hall (6,905); Champaign, IL
2/24/1951	No. 10	at Ohio State	W 89–69	17-3 (11-1)	Ohio Expo Center Coliseum (4,220); Columbus, OH
3/3/1951	No. 6	at Northwestern; Rivalry	W 80–76	18-3 (12-1)	Patten Gymnasium (18,000); Evanston, IL
3/5/1951	No. 5	at Michigan State	W 49–43	19-3 (13-1)	Jenison Fieldhouse (6,234); East Lansing, MI
NCAA tournament
3/14/1951*	No. 5	at No. 4 Kansas State; NCAA Tournament Warm-Up Game	L 72–91	19-4	Ahearn Field House (14,000); Manhattan, KS
3/20/1951*	No. 5	vs. No. 3 Columbia; NCAA Tournament first round	W 79–71	20-4	Madison Square Garden (17,107); New York, NY
3/22/1951*	No. 5	vs. No. 8 NC State; NCAA Tournament Second Round	W 84–70	21-4	Madison Square Garden (17,000); New York, NY
3/24/1951*	No. 5	vs. No. 1 Kentucky; NCAA Tournament East Regional Final	L 74–76	21-5	Madison Square Garden (17,000); New York, NY
3/27/1951*	No. 5	vs. No. 14 Oklahoma A&M; NCAA Tournament 3rd Place Game	W 57–53	22-5	Williams Arena (15,438); Minneapolis, MN
*Non-conference game. ^{#}Rankings from AP Poll. (#) Tournament seedings in parentheses. All times are in Central Time.

== Player stats ==
Player	Games Played	Field Goals	Free Throws	Points
Don Sunderlage	27	150	171	471
Ted Beach	27	124	47	295
Rod Fletcher	27	115	60	290
Clive Follmer	27	88	64	240
Bob Peterson	27	85	67	237
Irv Bemoras	27	83	49	215
Max Baumgardner	23	29	11	69
Jim Bredar	20	15	4	34
Mack Follmer	12	9	3	21
Herb Gerecke	11	5	5	15
Dick Christiansen	7	6	3	15
John Marks	8	4	0	8
Jim Schuldt	16	1	4	6
Seymour Gantman	5	0	3	3
Richard Ems	1	1	0	2

== Awards and honors ==
- Don Sunderlage
  - Chicago Tribune Silver Basketball award (1951)
  - Helms 2nd team All-American (1951)
  - Sporting News 2nd team All-American (1951)
  - United Press International 3rd team All-American (1951)
  - Converse 3rd team All-American (1951)
  - Associated Press Honorable Mention All-American (1951)
  - Team Most Valuable Player
- Ted Beach
  - Converse Honorable Mention All-American (1951)
- Rod Fletcher
  - Converse Honorable Mention All-American (1951)

== Team players drafted into the NBA ==
Player	NBA Club	Round	Pick
Don Sunderlage	Philadelphia Warriors	1	9
Ted Beach	Indianapolis Olympians	7	73
