= Tom Blake (American football) =

American football player (1927–2020)

No. 64
- Position: Offensive tackle

Personal information
- Born: July 19, 1927; Bushton, Illinois, U.S.
- Died: September 29, 2020 (aged 93); Middletown, Ohio, U.S.
- Listed height: 6 ft 2 in (1.88 m)
- Listed weight: 220 lb (100 kg)

Career information
- High school: Middletown
- College: Tennessee (1945); Cincinnati (1947–1948)
- NFL draft: 1950: 30th round, 379th overall pick

Career history
- Erie Vets (1949); New York Bulldogs (1949)

Career NFL statistics
- Games played: 5
- Fumble recoveries: 1
- Stats at Pro Football Reference

Thomas Clinton Blake (July 19, 1927 – September 29, 2020) was an American professional football tackle who played for the New York Bulldogs. He played college football at the University of Tennessee and the University of Cincinnati, having previously attended Middletown High School in Ohio. He was inducted into the University of Cincinnati Athletic Hall of Fame in 1998.
