= Skippy Whitaker =

American basketball player

Personal information
- Born: August 29, 1930 Quantico, Virginia, U.S.
- Died: August 1990 (aged 59–60) London, United Kingdom
- Listed height: 6 ft 1 in (1.85 m)
- Listed weight: 180 lb (82 kg)

Career information
- High school: Sarasota (Sarasota, Florida)
- College: Kentucky (1949–1952)
- NBA draft: 1952: 3rd round, 25th overall pick
- Drafted by: Indianapolis Olympians
- Position: Point guard
- Number: 5

Career history
- 1955: Boston Celtics

Career highlights
- NCAA champion (1951)
- Stats at NBA.com
- Stats at Basketball Reference

Lucian Cary "Skippy" Whitaker (August 29, 1930 – August 1990) was an American professional basketball player. He won an NCAA championship at the University of Kentucky in 1951 and played briefly in the National Basketball Association (NBA).

Whitaker, a 6'1 Point guard, played collegiately at Kentucky for Adolph Rupp. As a junior, he was a member of the Wildcats' 1951 national championship team.

Whitaker was drafted by the Indianapolis Olympians in the 1952 NBA draft. He served as a second lieutenant in the United States Marine Corps after his graduation from the University of Kentucky in May 1952.

Whitaker played three games for the Boston Celtics during the 1954–55 NBA season. He scored 2 points in his 15 total minutes in the NBA.

Whitaker is believed to have died in London during August 1990.

== Career statistics ==
Legend
GP	Games played	GS	Games started	MPG	Minutes per game
FG%	Field goal percentage	3P%	3-point field goal percentage	FT%	Free throw percentage
RPG	Rebounds per game	APG	Assists per game	SPG	Steals per game
BPG	Blocks per game	PPG	Points per game	**Bold**	Career high

=== NBA ===
==== Regular season ====
Year	Team	GP	MPG	FG%	FT%	RPG	APG	PPG
1954–55	Boston	3	5.0	.167	–	.3	.3	.7
