= Bushton =

Bushton may refer to:

- Bushton, Illinois, USA
- Bushton, Kansas, USA
- Bushton, Wiltshire, England
