= Roland Minson =

American basketball player and coach (1929–2020)

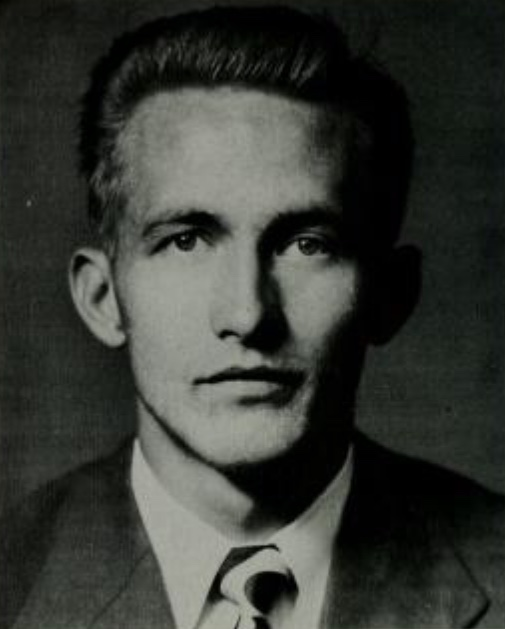
- Minson from the 1951 Banyan

Personal information
- Born: February 18, 1929 Idaho Falls, Idaho, U.S.
- Died: January 1, 2020 (aged 90) Afton, Wyoming, U.S.
- Listed height: 6 ft 0 in (1.83 m)
- Listed weight: 180 lb (82 kg)

Career information
- High school: Idaho Falls (Idaho Falls, Idaho)
- College: BYU (1948–1951)
- NBA draft: 1951: 2nd round, 15th overall pick
- Drafted by: New York Knicks
- Position: Small forward
- Number: 11
- Coaching career: 1961–1963

Career history

Coaching
- 1961–1963: BYU (assistant)

Career highlights
- 3× First-team All-Skyline Conference (1949–1951); NIT MVP (1951); NIT champion (1951); No. 11 retired by BYU Cougars
- Stats at Basketball Reference

Roland T. Minson (February 18, 1929 – January 1, 2020) was an American basketball player and coach, best known for his college career at Brigham Young University (BYU), where he led the Cougars to the 1951 National Invitation Tournament (NIT) championship.

Minson came to BYU from Idaho Falls High School in Idaho Falls, Idaho. He became a three-year starter and was a first team All-Conference pick for each of his varsity seasons. In his senior season, Minson averaged 16.7 points and along with teammate Mel Hutchins, led the Cougars to the 1951 National Invitation Tournament title at a time when the NIT winner was considered a national champion on par with the winner of the NCAA Tournament. Minson averaged 26 points per game in the tournament to take MVP honors. Following the conclusion of the NIT and NCAA Tournaments, Minson was selected to represent the West in the College East-West All-Star game. In his BYU career, Minson scored 1,407 points. At the time of his graduation, this made him the all-time leading scorer in Cougar history - a mark that would stand until Krešimir Ćosić broke it in 1973.

Following the close of his college career, Minson was drafted by the New York Knicks in the second round of the 1951 NBA draft (15th pick overall). However, he was drafted into active duty in the United States Navy for the Korean War. Upon returning, he passed on an offer to join the Knicks to go into the banking industry, continuing his basketball career with the Denver Bankers in the Amateur Athletic Union. He was on the All-Navy team in 1952. He served as an assistant coach at BYU from 1961 to 1963 under Stan Watts. Following his coaching stint, Minson returned to banking.

On February 16, 2013, Minson's jersey was retired by BYU alongside his former teammate Mel Hutchins.

Alongside his wife Carol, Minson raised seven children. Carol died in 2017. Minson died in his home in Afton, Wyoming on January 1, 2020. He was 90 years old.
