= 1950–51 Kentucky Wildcats men's basketball team =

1950–51 season of University of Kentucky men's basketball team

1950–51 Kentucky Wildcats men's basketball

NCAA tournament National champions NCAA men's basketball regular season champions SEC regular season champions

National Championship Game, W 68–58 vs. Kansas State
- Conference: Southeast Conference

Ranking
- Coaches: No. 1
- AP: No. 1
- Record: 32–2 (14–0 SEC)
- Head coach: Adolph Rupp
- Assistant coach: Harry Lancaster
- Captain: Walter Hirsch
- Home arena: Memorial Coliseum

1950–51 Southeastern Conference men's basketball standings
	Conf.				Overall
Team	W		L	PCT	W		L	PCT
No. 1 Kentucky	14	–	0	1.000	32	–	2	.941
Vanderbilt †	10	–	4	.714	19	–	8	.704
Alabama	10	–	4	.714	15	–	8	.652
Tulane	8	–	6	.571	12	–	12	.500
Auburn	6	–	8	.429	12	–	10	.545
Georgia	6	–	8	.429	13	–	11	.542
Florida	6	–	8	.429	11	–	12	.478
LSU	6	–	8	.429	10	–	14	.417
Georgia Tech	6	–	8	.429	8	–	19	.296
Ole Miss	5	–	9	.357	12	–	12	.500
Tennessee	5	–	9	.357	10	–	13	.435
Mississippi State	2	–	12	.143	3	–	16	.158
† 1951 SEC Tournament winner Rankings from AP Poll

The 1950–51 Kentucky Wildcats men's basketball team represented University of Kentucky. The head coach was Adolph Rupp. The team was a member of the Southeast Conference and played their home games at Memorial Coliseum. Two members of this team eventually returned to Kentucky as athletic director: Cliff Hagan from 1975 to 1988, and Charles Newton from 1989 to 2000.

== Roster ==
1950–51 Kentucky Wildcats men's basketball team
Players
Coaches

Pos.	#	Name	Height	Weight	Year	Previous school	Hometown
C	6	Cliff Hagan	6 ft 4 in (1.93 m)	200 lb (91 kg)	So	Owensboro	Owensboro, Kentucky
F	19	Walter Hirsch	6 ft 4 in (1.93 m)	180 lb (82 kg)	Sr	Northridge	Dayton, Ohio
F	11	Shelby Linville	6 ft 5 in (1.96 m)	200 lb (91 kg)	Jr	Middletown	Middletown, Ohio
G/F	35	Charles Newton	6 ft 2 in (1.88 m)	190 lb (86 kg)	Sr	Fort Lauderdale	Fort Lauderdale, Florida
C	77	Bill Spivey	7 ft 0 in (2.13 m)	200 lb (91 kg)	Jr	Macon Jordan	Warner Robins, Georgia
G	7	Guy Strong	6 ft 0 in (1.83 m)	165 lb (75 kg)	Sr	Irvine, Kentucky
G	38	Bobby Watson	5 ft 10 in (1.78 m)	155 lb (70 kg)	Jr	Owensboro, Kentucky
G	32	Lucian Whitaker	6 ft 0 in (1.83 m)	170 lb (77 kg)	Jr	Sarasota, Florida

Head coach

- Adolph Rupp (Kansas)

Assistant coach(es)

Legend

- (C) Team captain
- (S) Suspended
- (I) Ineligible
- (W) Walk-on
- Injured
- Current redshirt

== Schedule and results ==
Date time, TV	Rank^{#}	Opponent^{#}	Result	Record	Site city, state
Regular season
NCAA tournament
Mar 20, 1951*	No. 1	vs. Louisville	W 79–68	29–2	Madison Square Garden; New York, New York
Mar 22, 1951*	No. 1	vs. No. 9 St. John's	W 59–43	30–2	Madison Square Garden; New York, New York
Mar 24, 1951*	No. 1	vs. No. 5 Illinois; National Semifinal	W 76–74	31–2	Madison Square Garden (17,000); New York, New York
Mar 27, 1951*	No. 1	vs. No. 4 Kansas State; National Championship game	W 68–58	32–2	Williams Arena; Minneapolis, Minnesota
*Non-conference game. ^{#}Rankings from AP Poll. (#) Tournament seedings in parentheses.

=== NCAA basketball tournament ===
- Mideast
  - Kentucky 79, Louisville 68
  - Kentucky 59, St. John's, New York 43
- Final Four
  - Kentucky 76, Illinois 74
  - Kentucky 68, Kansas State 58

== Awards and honors ==
- Bill Spivey – consensus first-team All-American

== Team players drafted into the NBA ==
- No one from the Wildcats men's team was selected in the 1951 NBA draft.
