= 1970–71 Utah Redskins men's basketball team =

American college basketball season

1970–71 Utah Redskins men's basketball
- Conference: Western Athletic Conference
- Record: 15–11 (9–5 WAC)
- Head coach: Jack Gardner (18th season)
- Home arena: Jon M. Huntsman Center

1970–71 WAC men's basketball standings
	Conf.				Overall
Team	W		L	PCT	W		L	PCT
BYU	10	–	4	.714	18	–	11	.621
UTEP	9	–	5	.643	15	–	10	.600
Utah	9	–	5	.643	15	–	11	.577
Arizona State	8	–	6	.571	16	–	10	.615
Colorado State	7	–	7	.500	15	–	10	.600
Wyoming	6	–	8	.429	10	–	15	.400
New Mexico	4	–	10	.286	14	–	12	.538
Arizona	3	–	11	.214	10	–	16	.385
Rankings from AP Poll

The 1970–71 Utah Utes men's basketball team represented the University of Utah as a member of the Western Athletic Conference during the 1970–71 men's basketball season. The team finished with an overall record of 15–11 (9–5 WAC).

== Roster ==
1970–71 Utah Redskins men's basketball team
Players
Coaches

Pos.	#	Name	Height	Weight	Year	Hometown
G	25	Bob Beam	6 ft 3 in (1.91 m)	173 lb (78 kg)	Sr	La Crescenta, California
F	13	Dan Cowan	6 ft 4 in (1.93 m)	212 lb (96 kg)	Jr	Salt Lake City, Utah
F	35	Jack Gardner	6 ft 5 in (1.96 m)	204 lb (93 kg)	Sr	Clearfield, Utah
C	41	Jim Mahler	6 ft 10 in (2.08 m)	243 lb (110 kg)	Sr	West Jordan, Utah
G	14	Mike Newlin	6 ft 4 in (1.93 m)	201 lb (91 kg)	Sr	La Crescenta, California

Head coach

- Jack Gardner

Assistant coach(es)

- George Fisher
- Jerry Pimm

Legend

- (C) Team captain
- (S) Suspended
- (I) Ineligible
- (W) Walk-on
- Injured
- Current redshirt

== Schedule ==
Date time, TV	Rank^{#}	Opponent^{#}	Result	Record	Site city, state
December 3*		USC	L 81–90	0–1	Jon M. Huntsman Center; Salt Lake City, Utah
December 5*		at Utah State	L 77–94	0–2	Dee Glen Smith Spectrum; Logan, Utah
December 7*		at Oregon State	L 75–91	0–3	Gill Coliseum
December 12*		Northern Michigan	W 102–94	1–3	Jon M. Huntsman Center; Salt Lake City, Utah
December 18*		New York	W 102–67	2–3	Jon M. Huntsman Center; Salt Lake City, Utah
December 19*		Washington	W 89–78	3–3	Jon M. Huntsman Center; Salt Lake City, Utah
December 22*		No. 17 North Carolina	W 105–86	4–3	Jon M. Huntsman Center; Salt Lake City, Utah
December 26*		at Army	W 65–56	5–3	USMA Fieldhouse
December 28*		at Penn	L 78–86	5–4	Palestra; Philadelphia, Pennsylvania
December 29*		at St. Joseph	L 72–74	5–5	Hagan Arena
January 8		at UTEP	L 56–80	5–6 (0–1)	Memorial Gym; El Paso, Texas
January 9		at New Mexico	L 77–78	5–7 (0–2)	The Pit; Albuquerque, NM
January 15		Wyoming	W 93–74	6–7 (1–2)	Jon M. Huntsman Center; Salt Lake City, Utah
January 16		Colorado State	W 80–78	7–7 (2–2)	Jon M. Huntsman Center; Salt Lake City, Utah
January 21*		No. 12 Utah State	L 92–102	7–8 (2–2)	Jon M. Huntsman Center; Salt Lake City, Utah
January 23*		at Stanford	W 99–91	8–8 (2–2)	Maples Pavilion
January 28		at Arizona	W 99–86	9–8 (3–2)	Bear Down Gym; Tucson, Arizona
January 30		at Arizona State	W 95–90	10–8 (4–2)	Sun Devil Gymnasium
February 6		at BYU	L 89–103	10–9 (4–3)	George Albert Smith Field House
February 11		New Mexico	W 69–62	11–9 (5–3)	Jon M. Huntsman Center; Salt Lake City, Utah
February 13		UTEP	W 69–64	12–9 (6–3)	Jon M. Huntsman Center; Salt Lake City, Utah
February 19		at Colorado State	L 86–101	12–10 (6–4)	Moby Arena; Fort Collins, Colorado
February 20		at Wyoming	W 83–79	13–10 (7–4)	War Memorial Fieldhouse; Laramie, Wyoming
February 26		Arizona State	W 106–97	14–10 (8–4)	Jon M. Huntsman Center; Salt Lake City, Utah
February 27		Arizona	W 102–91	15–10 (9–4)	Jon M. Huntsman Center; Salt Lake City, Utah
March 6		BYU	L 87–98	15–11 (9–5)	Jon M. Huntsman Center; Salt Lake City, Utah
*Non-conference game. ^{#}Rankings from AP Poll. (#) Tournament seedings in parentheses.
