= Darrell Hunter =

American gridiron football player (born 1983)

No. 23
- Position: Cornerback

Personal information
- Born: November 29, 1983 (age 42); Middletown, Ohio, U.S.
- Listed height: 5 ft 11 in (1.80 m)
- Listed weight: 211 lb (96 kg)

Career information
- High school: Middletown
- College: Miami (Ohio)
- NFL draft: 2006: undrafted

Career history
- Arizona Cardinals (2006); Tampa Bay Buccaneers (2007)*; Indianapolis Colts (2007)*; Tampa Bay Buccaneers (2007–2008)*; New Orleans Saints (2008)*; Edmonton Eskimos (2009)*; Tampa Bay Buccaneers (2009)*; Florida Tuskers (2010)
- * Offseason or practice squad member only

Awards and highlights
- Second-team All-MAC (2004)

Career NFL statistics
- Total tackles: 2
- Stats at Pro Football Reference

Darrell Hunter Jr. (born November 29, 1983) is an American former professional football player who was a cornerback in the National Football League (NFL). He was signed by the Arizona Cardinals as an undrafted free agent in 2006. He played college football for the Miami RedHawks.

Hunter was also a member of the Tampa Bay Buccaneers, Indianapolis Colts, New Orleans Saints, Edmonton Eskimos, and Florida Tuskers.
