= 1966 National Invitation Tournament =

American basketball competition

- Season: 1965–66
- Teams: 14
- Finals site: Madison Square Garden, New York City
- Champions: BYU Cougars (2nd title)
- Runner-up: NYU Violets (2nd title game)
- Semifinalists: Villanova Wildcats (3rd semifinal); Army Black Knights (3rd semifinal)
- Winning coach: Stan Watts (2nd title)
- MVP: Bill Melchionni (Villanova)

The National Invitation Tournament was originated by the Metropolitan Basketball Writers Association in 1938. Responsibility for its administration was transferred two years later to local colleges, first known as the Metropolitan Intercollegiate Basketball Committee and in 1948, as the Metropolitan Intercollegiate Basketball Association (MIBA), which comprised representatives from five New York City schools: Fordham University, Manhattan College, New York University, St. John's University, and Wagner College. Originally all of the teams qualifying for the tournament were invited to New York City, and all games were played at Madison Square Garden.

The tournament originally consisted of only 6 teams, which later expanded to 8 teams in 1941, 12 teams in 1949, 14 teams in 1965, 16 teams in 1968, 24 teams in 1979, 32 teams in 1980, and 40 teams from 2002 through 2006. In 2007, the tournament reverted to the current 32-team format.

== Selected teams ==
Connecticut declined its invitation to the tournament. The 14 teams selected for the tournament were:

- Army
- Boston College
- BYU
- DePaul
- Louisville
- Manhattan
- NYU
- Penn State
- St. John's
- San Francisco
- Temple
- Villanova
- Virginia Tech
- Wichita State

== Bracket ==
Below is the tournament bracket.

First Round
Temple	88
Virginia Tech	73
San Francisco	89
Penn State	77
Army	71
Manhattan	66
NYU	68
DePaul	65
Villanova	63
St. John's	61
Boston College	96
Louisville	90

Quarterfinals
Temple	78
BYU	90
San Francisco	63
Army	80
NYU	90
Wichita State	84
Villanova	86
Boston College	85

Semifinals
BYU	66
Army	60
NYU	69
Villanova	63

Finals
BYU	97
NYU	84

Third place game
Army	65
Villanova	76

== See also ==
- 1966 NCAA University Division basketball tournament
- 1966 NCAA College Division basketball tournament
- 1966 NAIA Division I men's basketball tournament
