= 1950–51 Michigan Wolverines men's basketball team =

American college basketball season

1950–51 Michigan Wolverines men's basketball
- Conference: Big Ten Conference
- Record: 7–15 (3–11 Big Ten)
- Head coach: Ernie McCoy
- Captain: Chuck Murray
- Home arena: Yost Field House

1950–51 Big Ten Conference men's basketball standings
	Conf.				Overall
Team	W		L	PCT	W		L	PCT
No. 5 Illinois	13	–	1	.929	22	–	5	.815
No. 7 Indiana	12	–	2	.857	19	–	3	.864
Iowa	9	–	5	.643	15	–	7	.682
Minnesota	7	–	7	.500	13	–	9	.591
Northwestern	7	–	7	.500	12	–	10	.545
Wisconsin	7	–	7	.500	10	–	12	.455
Michigan State	5	–	9	.357	10	–	11	.476
Purdue	4	–	10	.286	8	–	14	.364
Michigan	3	–	11	.214	7	–	15	.318
Ohio State	3	–	11	.214	6	–	16	.273
Rankings from AP Poll

The 1950–51 Michigan Wolverines men's basketball team represented the University of Michigan in intercollegiate basketball during the 1950–51 season. The team finished the season in a tie for ninth place in the Big Ten Conference with an overall record of 7–15 and 3–11 against conference opponents.

Ernie McCoy was in his third year as the team's head coach. Leo VanderKuy was the team's leading scorer with 329 points in 22 games for an average of 15.0 points per game. Chuck Murray was the team captain.

== Statistical leaders ==
Player	Pos.	Yr	G	FG	FT	RB	Pts	PPG
Leo VanderKuy			22	119	91-169		329	15.0
James Skala			22	67	31-64		165	7.5
Chuck Murray			21	41	79-137		161	7.7
Thomas Tiernan			22	67	22-41		156	7.1
Robert Olson			22	43	21-35		107	4.9
Paul Geyer			16	21	6-17		48	3.0
Totals			22	423	314-569		1160	52.7
