= 1950–51 Georgia Bulldogs basketball team =

American college basketball season

1950–51 Georgia Bulldogs basketball
- Conference: Southeastern Conference
- Record: 13–11 (6–8 SEC)
- Head coach: Jim Whatley (2nd season)
- Captains: Joe Jordan; Earl Davis; Bob Schloss
- Home arena: Woodruff Hall

1950–51 Southeastern Conference men's basketball standings
	Conf.				Overall
Team	W		L	PCT	W		L	PCT
No. 1 Kentucky	14	–	0	1.000	32	–	2	.941
Vanderbilt †	10	–	4	.714	19	–	8	.704
Alabama	10	–	4	.714	15	–	8	.652
Tulane	8	–	6	.571	12	–	12	.500
Auburn	6	–	8	.429	12	–	10	.545
Georgia	6	–	8	.429	13	–	11	.542
Florida	6	–	8	.429	11	–	12	.478
LSU	6	–	8	.429	10	–	14	.417
Georgia Tech	6	–	8	.429	8	–	19	.296
Ole Miss	5	–	9	.357	12	–	12	.500
Tennessee	5	–	9	.357	10	–	13	.435
Mississippi State	2	–	12	.143	3	–	16	.158
† 1951 SEC Tournament winner Rankings from AP Poll

The 1950–51 Georgia Bulldogs basketball team represented the University of Georgia as a member of the Southeastern Conference (SEC) during the 1950–51 NCAA men's basketball season. Led by Jim Whatley in his second and final season as head coach, the Bulldogs compiled an overall record of 13–11 with a mark of 6–8 conference play, placing in a five-way tie for fifth in the SEC. The team captains were Joe Jordan, Earl Davis, and Bob Schloss.

== Roster ==
1950–51 Georgia Bulldogs men's basketball team
Players
Coaches

Pos.	#	Name	Height	Weight	Year	Previous school	Hometown
C		Bob Schloss	6 ft 8 in (2.03 m)	—	Sr
F		Earl Davis	6 ft 2 in (1.88 m)	—	Sr
G		Joe Jordan	5 ft 9 in (1.75 m)	—	Sr
F		Bill Shain	6 ft 1 in (1.85 m)	—
G		Zippy Morocco	5 ft 10 in (1.78 m)	—	So
G		Jim Umbricht	6 ft 4 in (1.93 m)	—
F		Dick Thomas	6 ft 0 in (1.83 m)	—	Sr
G		Kermith Hall	6 ft 2 in (1.88 m)	—
G		Minton Williams	6 ft 0 in (1.83 m)	—
F		Charles Bryant	6 ft 3 in (1.91 m)	—
C		John Marshall	6 ft 3 in (1.91 m)	—
F		Jack Turner	—	—

Head coach

Jim Whatley

Assistant coach(es)

Legend

- (C) Team captain
- (S) Suspended
- (I) Ineligible
- (W) Walk-on
- Injured
- Current redshirt

== Schedule ==
Date time, TV	Opponent	Result	Record	Site city, state
12/9/1950	Mercer	W 64-51	1–0	Athens, GA
12/12/1950	South Carolina	W 60-58	2–0	Athens, GA
12/14/1950	Clemson	W 58-45	3–0	Athens, GA
12/16/1950	at Alabama	L 39-60	3–1	
12/18/1950	at Clemson	L 69-70	3–2	
1/6/1951	Ole Miss	W 59-41	4–2	Athens, GA
1/9/1951	at Georgia Tech	L 50-56	4–3	
1/12/1951	Florida	W 64-48	5–3	Athens, GA
1/13/1951	at Auburn	L 68-69	5–4	
1/15/1951	Tulane	W 72-70	6–4	Athens, GA
1/18/1951	at South Carolina	W 59-57	7–4	
1/20/1951	Georgia Tech	W 77-66	8–4	Athens, GA
1/23/1951	at Mercer	W 60-58	9–4	
1/27/1951	Auburn	L 49-61	9–5	Athens, GA
2/3/1951	LSU	W 68-65	10–5	Athens, GA
2/6/1951	at Georgia Tech	W 54-53	11–5	
2/7/1951	at Tampa	L 56-64	11–6	
2/9/1951	at Florida	W 75-58	12–6	
2/10/1951	Alabama	L 53-56	12–7	Athens, GA
2/17/1951	Mississippi State	W 57-49	13–7	Athens, GA
2/23/1951	at Kentucky	L 41-88	13–8	
2/24/1951	Tennessee	L 62-74	13–9	Athens, GA
2/27/1951	Vanderbilt	L 57-69	13–10	Athens, GA
3/1/1951	Vanderbilt	L 60-70	13–11	Athens, GA
*Non-conference game. (#) Tournament seedings in parentheses.
