= 1950–51 Iowa State Cyclones men's basketball team =

American college basketball season

1950–51 Iowa State Cyclones men's basketball
- Conference: Big Seven Conference
- Record: 9–12 (3–9 Big Seven)
- Head coach: Clay Sutherland (4th season)
- Home arena: Iowa State Armory

1950–51 Big Seven Conference men's basketball standings
	Conf.				Overall
Team	W		L	PCT	W		L	PCT
No. 4 Kansas State	11	–	1	.917	25	–	4	.862
Kansas	8	–	4	.667	16	–	8	.667
Missouri	8	–	4	.667	16	–	8	.667
Oklahoma	6	–	6	.500	14	–	10	.583
Nebraska	4	–	8	.333	9	–	14	.391
Iowa State	3	–	9	.250	9	–	12	.429
Colorado	2	–	10	.167	4	–	20	.167
Rankings from AP Poll

The 1950–51 Iowa State Cyclones men's basketball team represented Iowa State University during the 1950–51 NCAA men's basketball season. The Cyclones were coached by Clay Sutherland, who was in his fourth season with the Cyclones. They played their home games at the Iowa State Armory in Ames, Iowa.

They finished the season 9–12, 3–9 in Big Seven play to finish in sixth place.

== Roster ==
1950–51 Iowa State Cyclones men's basketball team
Players
Coaches

Pos.	#	Name	Height	Weight	Year	Hometown
F		Gay Anderson	6 ft 5 in (1.96 m)	—	Sr	Council Bluffs, Iowa
G		Virg Byerly	5 ft 10 in (1.78 m)	—		Boone, Iowa
F		Eldon Clement	6 ft 2 in (1.88 m)	—		Le Mars, Iowa
C		Delmar Diercks	6 ft 8 in (2.03 m)	—	So	Mason City, Iowa
C		Gordon Dunker	6 ft 4 in (1.93 m)	—
F		George Hess	5 ft 9 in (1.75 m)	—
G		Bob Koch	5 ft 9 in (1.75 m)	—
G		Sam Long	5 ft 11 in (1.8 m)	—		Ottumwa, Iowa
G		Jack Luhrig	6 ft 3 in (1.91 m)	—		Sheldon, Iowa
G		Gene Paetz	5 ft 10 in (1.78 m)	—	Sr
		Nate Phipps	—	—
F		Clare Russie	6 ft 5 in (1.96 m)	—		Marshalltown, Iowa
F		Jim Stange	6 ft 7 in (2.01 m)	—		Davenport, Iowa
C		Sylvester Wilhelmi (C)	6 ft 5 in (1.96 m)	—	Sr	Le Mars, Iowa
G		Dan Youngblade	6 ft 3 in (1.91 m)	—	Jr	Sioux City, Iowa

Head coach

- Clay Sutherland

Assistant coach(es)

Legend

- (C) Team captain
- (S) Suspended
- (I) Ineligible
- (W) Walk-on
- Injured
- Current redshirt

== Schedule and results ==
Date time, TV	Rank^{#}	Opponent^{#}	Result	Record	Site city, state
Regular season
December 2, 1950*; 7:30 pm		South Dakota	W 62–59	1–0	Iowa State Armory; Ames, Iowa
December 4, 1950*; 7:30 pm		Simpson	W 77–44	2–0	Iowa State Armory; Ames, Iowa
December 9, 1950*; 8:15 pm		at Drake; Iowa Big Four	L 47–65	2–1	Drake Fieldhouse; Des Moines, Iowa
December 11, 1950*; 7:30 pm		Utah State	W 52–41	3–1	Iowa State Armory; Ames, Iowa
December 22, 1950*; 8:30 pm		Drake; Iowa Big Four	W 68–54	4–1	Iowa State Armory; Ames, Iowa
December 27, 1950*; 8:00 pm		vs. No. 10 Kansas; Big Seven Holiday Tournament Quarterfinals	L 51–75	4–2	Municipal Auditorium; Kansas City, Missouri
December 29, 1950*; 2:00 pm		vs. Colorado; Big Seven Holiday Tournament Consolation Semifinals	W 58–54 ^{OT}	5–2	Municipal Auditorium; Kansas City, Missouri
December 30, 1950*; 4:00 pm		vs. Oklahoma; Big Seven Holiday Tournament Fifth Place	L 50–68	5–3	Municipal Auditorium; Kansas City, Missouri
January 6, 1951; 7:30 pm, WOI		Oklahoma	W 48–44	6–3 (1–0)	Iowa State Armory; Ames, Iowa
January 8, 1951; 7:30 pm		at Nebraska	L 49–51	6–4 (1–1)	Nebraska Coliseum; Lincoln, Nebraska
January 13, 1951; 7:30 pm		at No. 9 Kansas State	L 58–98	6–5 (1–2)	Nichols Hall; Manhattan, Kansas
January 15, 1951; 7:30 pm		at Oklahoma	L 44–52	6–6 (1–3)	OU Field House; Norman, Oklahoma
January 20, 1951; 7:30 pm		Colorado	L 42–47 ^{OT}	6–7 (1–4)	Iowa State Armory; Ames, Iowa
January 22, 1951; 8:00 pm		at Missouri	L 46–49	6–8 (1–5)	Brewer Fieldhouse; Columbia, Missouri
January 29, 1951*; 7:30 pm		Creighton	W 75–49	7–8	Iowa State Armory; Ames, Iowa
February 2, 1951; 8:30 pm		Nebraska	W 67–51	8–8 (2–5)	Iowa State Armory; Ames, Iowa
February 10, 1951; 9:00 pm		at Colorado	W 63–59	9–8 (3–5)	Balch Fieldhouse; Boulder, Colorado
February 17, 1951; 7:30 pm		Kansas	L 54–56	9–9 (3–6)	Iowa State Armory; Ames, Iowa
February 26, 1951; 7:30 pm		Missouri	L 54–59	9–10 (3–7)	Iowa State Armory; Ames, Iowa
March 3, 1951; 7:30 pm		No. 4 Kansas State	L 47–81	9–11 (3–8)	Iowa State Armory; Ames, Iowa
March 7, 1951; 7:30 pm		at Kansas	L 64–70	9–12 (3–9)	Hoch Auditorium; Lawrence, Kansas
*Non-conference game. ^{#}Rankings from AP poll. (#) Tournament seedings in parentheses. All times are in Central Time.
