= 1951 National Invitation Tournament =

Annual NCAA basketball competition

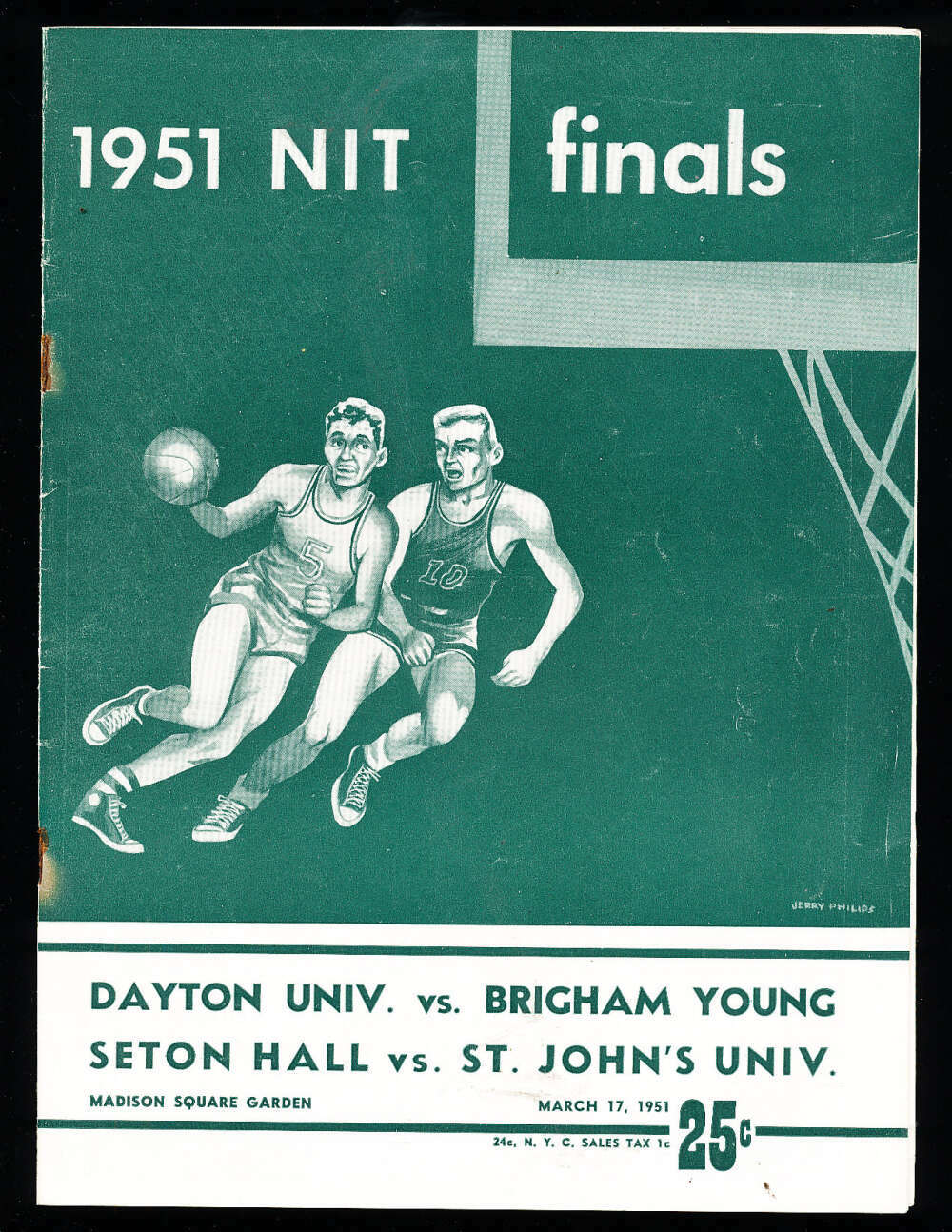
- Season: 1950–51
- Teams: 12
- Finals site: Madison Square Garden, New York City
- Champions: Brigham Young Cougars (1st title)
- Runner-up: Dayton Flyers (1st title game)
- Semifinalists: St. John's Redmen (6th semifinal); Seton Hall Pirates (2nd semifinal)
- Winning coach: Stan Watts (1st title)
- MVP: Roland Minson (BYU)

The 1951 National Invitation Tournament was the fourteenth edition of the annual NCAA college basketball competition. Held in New York City at Madison Square Garden, its championship was on Saturday, March 17, and BYU defeated Dayton by nineteen points.

The following week, BYU participated in the 16-team NCAA tournament, and lost in the quarterfinal round, by ten points to Kansas State.

== Selected teams ==
Twelve teams selected for the tournament.

- Arizona
- Beloit
- BYU
- Cincinnati
- Dayton
- La Salle
- Lawrence Tech
- NC State
- St. Bonaventure
- St. John's
- Saint Louis
- Seton Hall

== Bracket ==
Below is the tournament bracket.

First round
Saint Louis	73
La Salle	61
Seton Hall	71
Beloit	57
St. Bonaventure	70
Cincinnati	67
Dayton	77
Lawrence Tech	71

Quarterfinals
Saint Louis	58
BYU	75
NC State	59
Seton Hall	71
St. Bonaventure	58
St. John's	60
Arizona	68
Dayton	74

Semifinals
BYU	69
Seton Hall	59
St. John's	62
Dayton	69

Finals
BYU	62
Dayton	43

Third place game
Seton Hall	68
St. John's	70

== See also ==
- 1951 NCAA basketball tournament
- 1951 NAIA Division I men's basketball tournament
