= Jack Stone (basketball) =

American basketball player

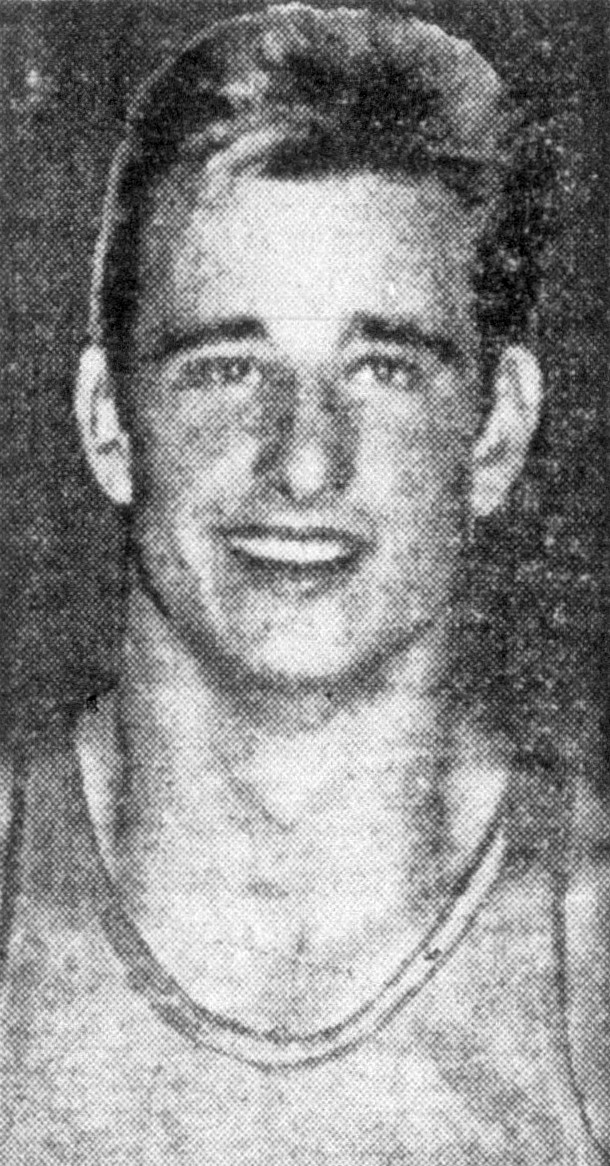

Personal information
- Born: Los Angeles, California, U.S.
- Listed height: 6 ft 3 in (1.91 m)
- Listed weight: 190 lb (86 kg)

Career information
- High school: University (Los Angeles, California)
- College: Kansas State (1948–1951)
- NBA draft: 1951: 2nd round, 10th overall pick
- Drafted by: Baltimore Bullets
- Position: Guard / forward

Career history
- 1951–195?: Los Angeles Fibber McGee & Mollys

Career highlights
- AAU All-American (1952); First team all-Big Seven (1951)
- Stats at Basketball Reference

Jack Stone was an American professional basketball player. He was selected with the 11th pick in the 1951 NBA draft.

== Kansas State ==
Stone played in the 1951 NCAA Division I men's basketball tournament. The team would lose to the eventual champion Kentucky Wildcats in the final game.

== Baltimore Bullets ==
Stone was one of several players drafted by the Bullets in the 1951 NBA Draft.
