= Rardin, Illinois =

Rardin
- Unincorporated community
- Location within Illinois
- Coordinates: 39°36′15″N 088°06′06″W
- Country: United States
- State: Illinois
- County: Coles
- Township: Morgan
- Elevation: 669 ft (204 m)
- ZIP code: 61920
- GNIS feature ID: 0416396

Rardin is an unincorporated community in Morgan Township, Coles County, Illinois, United States.

== Geography ==
Rardin is located at 39°36′15″N 088°06′06″W at an elevation of 669 feet.
