= Mekeli Wesley =

Fijian-Samoan former basketball player (born 1979)

Personal information
- Born: 2 February 1979 (age 47) Suva, Fiji
- Listed height: 6 ft 9 in (2.06 m)
- Listed weight: 240 lb (109 kg)

Career information
- High school: Provo (Provo, Utah)
- College: BYU (1997–2001)
- NBA draft: 2001: undrafted
- Playing career: 2001–2010
- Position: Forward

Career history
- 2001: Mulhouse
- 2001: Polonia Warszawa
- 2001–2002: Ferrol CB
- 2001–2004: Eurolines Vilvoorde
- 2004–2005: Stade Clermontois BA
- 2005: C.S. Autun Basket
- 2005: S.L. Benfica
- 2009–2010: Bucaneros de Campeche

Career highlights
- Mountain West Player of the Year (2001); First-team All-Mountain West (2001); Second-team All-Mountain West (2000); AP Honorable mention All-American (2001); Mountain West tournament MVP (2001)

Mekeli Tiu Wesley (born 2 February 1979) is a Fijian-Samoan former basketball player who starred in the United States before embarking on an international professional career. In college, he was the 2001 Mountain West Conference Player of the Year while playing for Brigham Young (BYU). Professionally, Wesley's staggered career began in 2001 and officially ended in 2010. He now works in the insurance industry.

== Early life ==
Wesley was born in Suva, Fiji as one of five children to parents Hiagi and Susan Wesley, who met one another while attending BYU. He grew up in Provo, Utah and attended Provo High School. While on the basketball team, Wesley guided the Bulldogs to state championships in 1994–95 and 1996–97. For his high school career he averaged 21.7 points and 10.8 rebounds and was a three-time all-state selection. Both the Salt Lake Tribune and Deseret News named him their MVP. Wesley also represented Western Samoa in National Junior Olympics.

He was recruited by universities such as Colorado State, Hawaii, Washington State, LSU, Marquette, Pepperdine and Loyola Marymount. Ultimately, however, Wesley chose BYU and enrolled the fall of 1997.

== College ==
During Mekeli Wesley's four-year career as a Cougar, he scored 1,740 points and held the school record for most free throws made in a game with 16 (since broken by Jimmer Fredette). As a freshman, Wesley started in 29 of 30 games, was named to the WAC All-Newcomer Team, was named the most valuable player of the Cougar Classic, and held averages of 13.5 points and 5.0 rebounds per game. As a sophomore, he was suspended for the first semester due to violating BYU rules, but came back to average 11.0 points and 4.9 rebounds per game. Then, as a junior in 1999–2000, he increased his averages to career-highs of 16.8 points and 5.8 rebounds en route to an All-Mountain West Conference Second Team selection.

In his final collegiate season, Mekeli led BYU in scoring at 17.2 points per game and in rebounding at 5.2 per game. For the first time since 1993, BYU won or shared a conference title, and for the first time since 1992 won the conference tournament championship. He was a two-time MWC Player of the Week and at the end of the season was named the conference player of the year.

== Professional ==
Despite being a viable draft candidate in the 2001 NBA draft, Wesley went unselected. He never got the chance to compete in the National Basketball Association but he did embark on an international career that ultimately spanned between 2001 and 2010. He played for teams in France, Poland, Spain, Belgium, Portugal and Mexico.

== Personal ==
Wesley is married to Montell McDonald and they have a son, Keliano John. Mekeli is the older brother of professional basketball player Tai Wesley. Tai, coincidentally, was also named a Division I conference player of the year; in 2011 he earned the Western Athletic Conference Player of the Year while at Utah State. Wesley is of Rotuman and Samoan descent.
