= Morgan Township, Coles County, Illinois =

Morgan Township
- Township
- Location in Coles County

- Coles County's location in Illinois
- Coordinates: 39°36′N 88°7′W
- Country: United States
- State: Illinois
- County: Coles
- Established: November 8, 1859

Area
  - Total: 26.51 sq mi (68.7 km^{2})
  - Land: 26.48 sq mi (68.6 km^{2})
  - Water: 0.03 sq mi (0.078 km^{2}) 0.11%
- Elevation: 669 ft (204 m)

Population (2020)
  - Total: 304
  - Density: 11.5/sq mi (4.43/km^{2})
- Time zone: UTC-6 (CST)
  - Summer (DST): UTC-5 (CDT)
- ZIP codes: 61920, 61930, 61943
- FIPS code: 17-029-50400

Morgan Township is one of twelve townships in Coles County, Illinois, USA. As of the 2020 census, its population was 304 and it contained 157 housing units.

== Geography ==
According to the 2010 census, the township has a total area of 26.51 square miles (68.7 km^{2}), of which 26.48 square miles (68.6 km^{2}) (or 99.89%) is land and 0.03 square miles (0.078 km^{2}) (or 0.11%) is water.

=== Unincorporated towns ===
- Bushton
- Rardin

=== Cemeteries ===
The township contains five cemeteries: Craig, Hoagland (historical), Knoch, Union and Winkleblack.

== Demographics ==
As of the 2020 census there were 304 people, 137 households, and 81 families residing in the township. The population density was 11.49 inhabitants per square mile (4.44/km^{2}). There were 157 housing units at an average density of 5.93 units per square mile (2.29 units/km^{2}). The racial makeup of the township was 92.76% White, 0.00% African American, 0.00% Native American, 0.33% Asian, 0.00% Pacific Islander, 0.00% from other races, and 6.91% from two or more races. Hispanic or Latino of any race were 2.63% of the population.

There were 137 households, out of which 27.00% had children under the age of 18 living with them, 42.34% were married couples living together, 16.79% had a female householder with no spouse present, and 40.88% were non-families. 32.10% of all households were made up of individuals, and 18.20% had someone living alone who was 65 years of age or older. The average household size was 2.42 and the average family size was 3.14.

The township's age distribution consisted of 13.9% under the age of 18, 11.8% from 18 to 24, 25.9% from 25 to 44, 28.3% from 45 to 64, and 19.9% who were 65 years of age or older. The median age was 43.7 years. For every 100 females, there were 109.5 males. For every 100 females age 18 and over, there were 129.8 males.

The median income for a household in the township was $57,813. Males had a median income of $78,315 versus $30,652 for females. The per capita income for the township was $30,516. About 28.4% of families and 23.0% of the population were below the poverty line, including none of those under age 18 and 50.0% of those age 65 or over.

Historical population
Census	Pop.	Note	%±
2010	359		—
2020	304		−15.3%
U.S. Decennial Census

== School districts ==
- Arcola Consolidated Unit School District 306
- Charleston Community Unit School District 1
- Oakland Community Unit School District 5

== Political districts ==
- Illinois' 15th congressional district
- State House District 110
- State Senate District 55
