= 2000–01 BYU Cougars men's basketball team =

American college basketball season

2000–01 BYU Cougars men's basketball

Mountain West regular season co-champions Mountain West Tournament Champions

NCAA tournament, first round
- Conference: Mountain West Conference
- Record: 24–9 (10–4 Mountain West)
- Head coach: Steve Cleveland (4th season)
- Home arena: Marriott Center

2000–01 Mountain West Conference men's basketball standings
	Conf.				Overall
Team	W		L	PCT	W		L	PCT
Utah	10	–	4	.714	19	–	12	.613
BYU †	10	–	4	.714	24	–	9	.727
Wyoming	10	–	4	.714	20	–	10	.667
UNLV	7	–	7	.500	16	–	13	.552
New Mexico	6	–	8	.429	21	–	13	.618
Colorado State	6	–	8	.429	15	–	13	.536
San Diego State	4	–	10	.286	14	–	14	.500
Air Force	3	–	11	.214	8	–	21	.276
† 2001 Mountain West tournament winner Rankings from AP Poll

The 2000–01 BYU Cougars men's basketball team represented Brigham Young University during the 2000–01 season. Led by head coach Steve Cleveland, the Cougars earned their first Mountain West Conference championship. This was also their first of three eventual NCAA Tournament appearances under Cleveland. This was also the Cougars' first tournament appearance since 1995.

== Roster ==
2000–01 BYU Cougars men's basketball team
Players
Coaches

Pos.	#	Name	Height	Weight	Year	Hometown
G	2	Travis Hansen	6 ft 6 in (1.98 m)	210 lb (95 kg)	So	Orem, Utah
C	40	Dan Howard	7 ft 0 in (2.13 m)	225 lb (102 kg)	Fr	Kaysville, Utah
F	32	Bart Jepsen	6 ft 9 in (2.06 m)	235 lb (107 kg)	RS So	Roswell, New Mexico

Head coach

- Steve Cleveland

Assistant coach(es)

Legend

- (C) Team captain
- (S) Suspended
- (I) Ineligible
- (W) Walk-on
- Injured
- Current redshirt

Roster

== Tournament schedule ==
Mountain West Tournament
First round Vs. Air Force, Thomas and Mack Center, Las Vegas, NV - W, 69-54
Semifinal Vs. Wyoming, Thomas and Mack Center, Las Vegas, NV - W, 77-66
Final Vs. New Mexico, Thomas and Mack Center, Las Vegas, NV - W, 69-65
NCAA Tournament
First Round Vs. Cincinnati, Cox Arena, San Diego, CA - L, 59-84
