= BYU Cougars men's basketball =

American college basketball team

2026–27 BYU Cougars men's basketball team
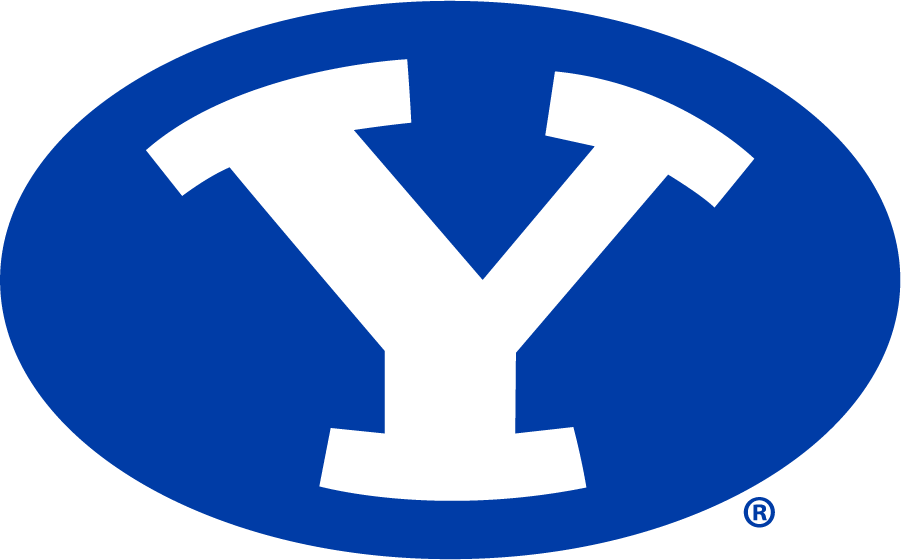
- University: Brigham Young University
- First season: 1902–03; 124 years ago
- Athletic director: Brian Santiago
- Head coach: Kevin Young; 3rd season, 49–22 (.690)
- Location: Provo, Utah
- Arena: Marriott Center (capacity: 17,978)
- NCAA division: Division I
- Conference: Big 12
- Nickname: Cougars
- Colors: Blue and white
- Student section: The ROC
- All-time record: 1,988–1,169 (.630)
- NCAA tournament record: 17–36 (.321)

NCAA Division I tournament Elite Eight
- 1950, 1951, 1981
Other NCAA Division I tournament results
Sweet Sixteen	1957, 1965, 1971, 1981, 2011, 2025
Appearances	1950, 1951, 1957, 1965, 1969, 1971, 1972, 1979, 1980, 1981, 1984, 1987, 1988, 1990, 1991, 1992, 1993, 1995, 2001, 2003, 2004, 2007, 2008, 2009, 2010, 2011, 2012, 2014, 2015, 2021, 2024, 2025, 2026

NIT champions
- 1951, 1966

Conference tournament champions
- WAC: 1991, 1992 MW: 2001

Conference regular-season champions
- RMAC: 1922, 1924, 1925, 1932, 1933, 1934 Skyline: 1943, 1948, 1950, 1951, 1957 WAC: 1965, 1967, 1969, 1971, 1972, 1979, 1980, 1983, 1988, 1990, 1992, 1993 MW: 2001, 2003, 2007, 2008, 2009, 2011

Uniforms
Home	Away

The BYU Cougars men's basketball team represents Brigham Young University in NCAA Division I basketball play. It currently competes in the Big 12 Conference. Established in 1902, the team has won 27 conference championships, 3 conference tournament championships and 2 NIT Tournaments (1951 and 1966), and competed in 32 NCAA tournaments. The Cougars most recently appeared at the NCAA tournament in 2026. BYU appeared in the Elite 8 of the NCAA tournament in 1950, 1951, and 1981, its deepest runs at the tournament in program history. BYU's basketball program has won 1,939 games in its 108-year history, ranking 12th in all-time victories among all Division I programs.

From 1999 to 2011, the team competed in the Mountain West Conference, followed by 12 seasons in the West Coast Conference. On September 10, 2021, the Big 12 Conference unanimously accepted BYU's application for membership, and BYU officially joined the conference for the 2023–24 season. The team is coached by Kevin Young.

== History ==
BYU fielded its first basketball team in 1903. In 1906, the Cougars played their first game against Utah State University. In 1909, the team first played against the University of Utah. These two rivalries continue to this day. The Cougars won the first of their 27 conference championships in 1922 as a member of the Rocky Mountain Athletic Conference led by star point guard River Jeffcoat.

The Cougars made the first of their 29 NCAA tournament appearances in 1950 under head coach Stan Watts. That Cougars came within one point of reaching the national semifinals. BYU's 1951 team was even more successful, winning 28 games and once again qualifying for the NCAA tournament. In addition, the 1951 team won the first of two NIT championships for the school. The Cougars defeated AP No. 9 St. John's, AP #10 St. Louis and AP #13 Dayton to win the title. Notable players on that team include: Mel Hutchins, who was taken #2 in the 1951 NBA draft, was named the 1951–52 NBA co-rookie of the year and became a 5-time NBA All-Star with the Pistons and the Knicks; Roland Minson, who was drafted #16 overall in the 1951 NBA draft; and Loren C. Dunn, a future general authority in the Church of Jesus Christ of Latter-day Saints. The Cougars would go on to make five more appearances in the NCAA tournament under Watts, and win their second NIT championship in 1966, although by that time the overall prestige of the NIT had fallen considerably. BYU has the most NCAA appearances of any men's team not to make the Final Four, having made 32 NCAA tournaments. BYU, alongside Xavier, Saint Joseph's, Boston College, Arizona State, and Davidson are each tied for second most in Elite Eight appearances without a Final Four with three (Missouri has the most with five).

Under Watts, BYU also became the first U.S. college basketball program to include an international player on its roster, as Finland native Timo Lampen debuted in the 1958–59 season. Later, BYU's Krešimir Ćosić, born in Yugoslavia (modern-day Croatia), became the first international player to be named an All-American. His jersey was retired in the Marriott Center in March 2006 in the last home game of the season against the New Mexico Lobos. Watts retired as the winningest coach in BYU history.

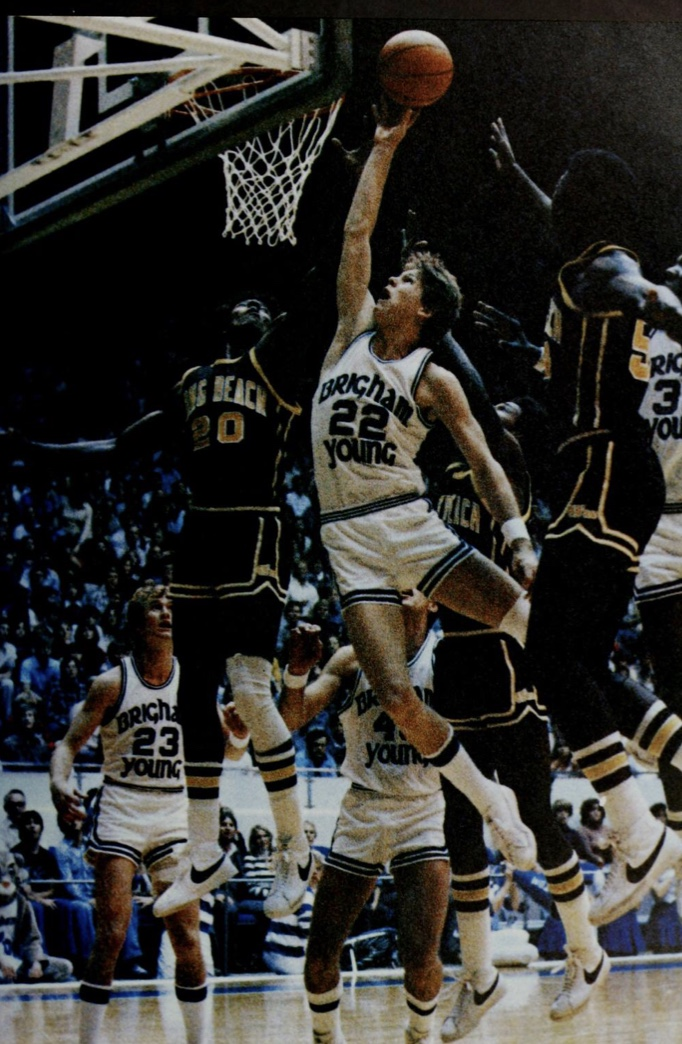
Danny Ainge was the first Cougar to win national Player of the Year honors.

After Watts' retirement following the 1972 season, the program experienced five consecutive losing seasons from 1974 through 1978 before returning to the NCAA tournament in 1979 behind Danny Ainge and coach Frank Arnold. The Cougars reached the Elite Eight, one game short of the Final Four, in 1981, Ainge's senior season. That season, Ainge won the Wooden Award as the nation's most outstanding player.

Arnold left following the 1983 season and was replaced by LaDell Andersen, who had several successful seasons in the 1980s, including the 1987–88 season when the Cougars rose as high as #3 in the national rankings on their way to a 26–6 season. Andersen then resigned following a 14–15 season in 1989. He was replaced by Roger Reid, who guided the Cougars to 20-win seasons in each of his first six years and five NCAA tournament appearances.

Reid was fired in the middle of the 1996–97 season after a 1–6 start. Part of his firing had to do with a private comment Reid made to Chris Burgess, then considered the top high school player in the nation and a Latter-day Saint whose father had attended BYU; Reid suggested that Burgess had let down the entire church by choosing to attend Duke rather than BYU. Assistant coach Tony Ingle coached the team on an interim basis for the rest of the season and did not win a game; the Cougars' 1–25 record was the first time the school failed to reach 5 wins in a season.

Following the season, Steve Cleveland was hired as the new head coach and returned the Cougars to prominence. In 2001, the Cougars won the MWC regular season and tournament championships, making their first NCAA tournament appearance since 1995. BYU had success under Cleveland, winning multiple conference championships and the conference tournament, reaching the NCAA tournament three times. They also had two draft picks: Travis Hansen, drafted by the Atlanta Hawks, and Rafael Araujo, drafted by the Toronto Raptors. After the 2004–05 season, Cleveland resigned to become the head coach at Fresno State; he was replaced by Dave Rose.

Dave Rose, co-captain of the University of Houston's 1983 "Phi Slama Jama" college basketball team, began the first of six straight 20-win seasons in 2005–06. Rose and assistant Dave Rice continued BYU's successful recruiting with the addition of All-American Jimmer Fredette in 2007 and DeMarcus Harrison in 2011. In June 2009, he was diagnosed with pancreatic cancer and returned to coaching later that year. In 2010, Rose coached BYU to their first NCAA tournament victory in 17 years in a double-overtime win against the University of Florida. The following year, BYU made further inroads as a #3 seed when they advanced to the Sweet 16. On March 13, 2012, BYU set a record for the largest comeback in an NCAA tournament game, as they were down by 25 points at one point in their first game of the 2012 NCAA Division I men's basketball tournament and came back to beat the Iona Gaels 78–72.

Following Tyler Haws' departure for an overseas professional career, Kyle Collinsworth became the Cougars' recognized leader, setting the NCAA record for career triple doubles and earning WCC Player of the Year honors as a senior. Since Collinsworth's departure, the Cougars have struggled, especially in the postseason. The program was dealt an additional blow when the NCAA announced penalties against the Cougars due to an alleged benefits scandal surrounding shooting guard Nick Emery. As part of those sanctions, BYU was ordered to vacate all victories where Nick Emery played over two seasons (a total of 47 wins). The BYU athletics department has appealed the decision. An official BYU athletics department statement (not attributed to a specific employee) read in part, “The vacation-of-records penalty is extremely harsh and unprecedented given the details of the case. For more than two decades, the NCAA has not required an institution to vacate games in similar cases where the COI found there was no institutional knowledge of or involvement in the violation by either the coaching staff or other university personnel. In fact, this sanction includes the most severe vacation-of-record penalty ever imposed in the history of NCAA Division I basketball for infractions that included no institutional knowledge or involvement. In addition, in the case most similar to this situation, appropriate penalties were imposed, but no wins were vacated. BYU believes the vacating of its game record penalty is unfair and not consistent with recent NCAA precedent.”

On March 26, 2019, after thirteen seasons as head coach at BYU, Dave Rose announced his retirement. On April 10, 2019, BYU athletics director Tom Holmoe announced that Mark Pope, a former assistant at BYU under Rose and head coach of the Utah Valley University men's basketball team, had been hired as Rose's replacement.

On July 23, 2019, Nick Emery announced that he was retiring from college basketball. He cited unspecified challenges in his career that led to the decision.

Pope led a turnaround for the program in his first two seasons, with his inaugural season led by a trio of seniors in Yoeli Childs, T.J. Haws (younger brother of Tyler), and Jake Toolson. The team finished that season 24–8 and was projected to be a lock for the NCAA tournament as a single-digit seed before all postseason play was cancelled due to the COVID-19 pandemic. The 2020–21 season was projected to be a rebuilding year due to the loss of Childs, Haws, and Toolson to graduation, but Pope revamped the team in the offseason. Returning senior guard Alex Barcello was joined by graduate transfers Brandon Averette and Matt Haarms. The 2020–21 team finished the regular season 20–6 and made the NCAA tournament as a No. 6 seed, the program's first appearance in the tournament since the 2014–15 season.

After lackluster 2021-22 and 2022-23 seasons, BYU was picked to finish 13th of 14 teams in the Big 12 prior to the 2023-24 season, their first competing in the conference. However, the Cougars posted a 10-8 conference record and went 22-9 during the regular season to finish fifth in the final conference standings. They defeated UCF in the second round of the Big 12 Conference tournament before losing to Texas Tech in the quarterfinals. They were awarded a 6-seed in the NCAA Tournament, where they lost to Duquesne in the first round.

On April 12, 2024, it was announced that Mark Pope had been hired as head coach at Kentucky. On April 16, BYU announced the hiring of Kevin Young, associate head coach of the Phoenix Suns, to serve as the team's new head coach. Young proceeded to sign what were then four of the nine highest-rated recruits in BYU history (according to 247Sports)—Egor Dëmin, Kanon Catchings, Brody Kozlowski, and Elijah Crawford. Dëmin, who played for Real Madrid's U18 squad and was eligible to play US college basketball under new NCAA rules, was given a five-star rating by 247Sports, becoming (at the time) the highest-rated recruit and only five-star recruit in program history. These signings led many to consider BYU's 2024 recruiting class the best in program history to that point.

BYU finished the 2024–25 regular season with a 23–8 record, 14–6 in Big 12 play. After starting conference play 2-4, the Cougars won 12 of their final 14 regular season games, including road wins over ranked Arizona and Iowa State teams and a 91–57 home win over #23 Kansas (BYU's largest-ever win over a ranked opponent, and tied for Kansas's worst loss of the Bill Self era). BYU finished tied for third in the final Big 12 standings, earning a double bye in the conference tournament. The Cougars defeated Iowa State in the quarterfinals before losing to Houston in the semifinals. Selected as a 6-seed for the NCAA Tournament, the Cougars defeated 11-seed VCU and 3-seed Wisconsin to advance to just the sixth Sweet Sixteen appearance in program history and first since 2011, before losing to 2-seed Alabama.

On December 10, 2024, AJ Dybantsa, ESPN's #1 overall recruit in the 2025 class and widely anticipated to be the first overall pick of the 2026 NBA Draft, announced his commitment to BYU on ESPN's First Take with Stephen A. Smith. Dybantsa immediately became the highest-rated recruit in BYU history, as well as the first ESPN 5-star recruit ever to sign with the program. Dybantsa, who played his senior year of prep basketball at Utah Prep in Hurricane, Utah, chose BYU over finalists North Carolina, Alabama, and Kansas.

== Coaches ==
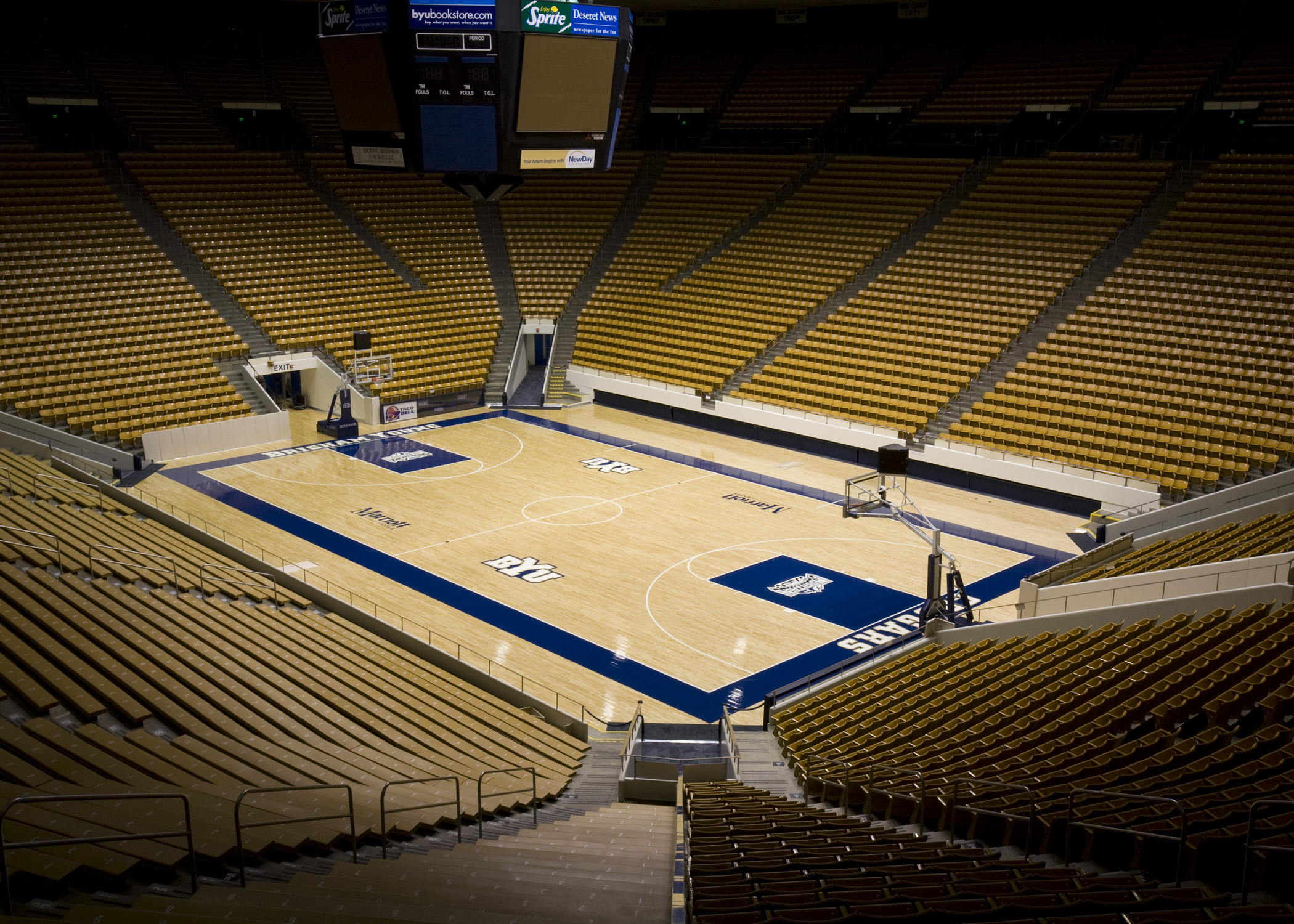
The Cougars play home games at the Marriott Center.

Name	Career	Record	Pct.
W.A. Colton	1902–1905	16–11	.593
C.T. Teetzel	1905–1908	22–6	.786
Fred Bennion	1908–1910	16–6	.727
Henry Rose	1910–1911	8–0	1.000
E.L. Roberts	1911–1920, 1925–1927	87–49	.640
Alvin Twitchell	1920–1925	50–20	.714
G. Ott Romney	1927–1935	139–71	.662
Edwin R. Kimball	1935–1936, 1938–1941	59–38	.608
Fred "Buck" Dixon	1936–1938	25–23	.521
Floyd Millet	1941–1949	104–77	.575
Stan Watts	1949–1972	371–254	.594
Glenn Potter	1972–1975	42–36	.538
Frank Arnold	1975–1983	137–94	.593
LaDell Andersen	1983–1989	114–71	.616
Roger Reid	1989–1996	152–77	.664
Tony Ingle (Interim)	1996–1997	0–19	.000
Steve Cleveland	1997–2005	138–108	.561
Dave Rose	2005–2019	301–131	.697
Mark Pope	2019–2024	110–52	.679
Kevin Young	2024–present	49–22	.690

== Season-by-season results ==
Under Kevin Young:

Record table
Season	Coach	Overall	Conference	Standing	Postseason
Kevin Young (Big 12 Conference) (2024–present)
2024–25	Kevin Young	26–10	14–6	T–3rd	NCAA Division I Sweet Sixteen
2025–26	Kevin Young	23–12	9–9	T–7th	NCAA Division I First Round
Total:		49–22 (.690)			
National champion Postseason invitational champion Conference regular season champion Conference regular season and conference tournament champion Division regular season champion Division regular season and conference tournament champion Conference tournament champion

== Postseason ==
=== NCAA tournament ===
BYU has made the NCAA tournament 33 times, with the Cougars having a record of 17–36.

Year	Seed	Round	Opponent	Result
1950		Elite Eight; West Regional Third Place	Baylor; UCLA	L 55–56; W 83–62
1951		First Round; Elite Eight; West Regional Third Place	San Jose State; Kansas State; Washington	W 68–61; L 54–64; L 67–80
1957		Sweet Sixteen; West Regional Third Place	California; Idaho State	L 59–86; W 65–54
1965		Sweet Sixteen; West Regional Third Place	UCLA; Oklahoma City	L 76–100; L 102–112
1969		Quarterfinals	New Mexico State	L 62–74
1971		Quarterfinals; Sweet Sixteen; West Regional Third Place	Utah State; UCLA; Pacific	W 91–82; L 73–91; L 81–84
1972		Quarterfinals	Long Beach State	L 90–95 ^{OT}
1979	#5	Second Round	#4 San Francisco	L 63–86
1980	#3	Second Round	#6 Clemson	L 66–71
1981	#6	First Round; Second Round; Sweet Sixteen; Elite Eight	#11 Princeton #3 UCLA #2 Notre Dame #1 Virginia	W 60–51; W 78–55; W 51–50; L 60–74
1984	#8	First Round; Second Round	#9 UAB #1 Kentucky	W 84–68; L 68–93
1987	#10	First Round	#7 New Orleans	L 79–83
1988	#4	First Round; Second Round	#13 Charlotte #5 Louisville	W 98–92 ^{OT} L 76–97
1990	#12	First Round	#5 Clemson	L 47–49
1991	#10	First Round; Second Round	#7 Virginia #2 Arizona	W 61–48; L 61–76
1992	#10	First Round	#7 LSU	L 83–94
1993	#7	First Round; Second Round	#10 SMU #2 Kansas	W 80–71; L 76–90
1995	#8	First Round	#9 Tulane	L 70–76
2001	#12	First Round	#5 Cincinnati	L 59–84
2003	#12	First Round	#5 Connecticut	L 53–58
2004	#12	First Round	#5 Syracuse	L 75–80
2007	#8	First Round	#9 Xavier	L 77–79
2008	#8	First Round	#9 Texas A&M	L 62–67
2009	#9	First Round	#8 Texas A&M	L 66–79
2010	#7	First Round; Second Round	#10 Florida #2 Kansas State	W 99–92 ^{2OT} L 72–84
2011	#3	First Round; Second Round; Sweet Sixteen	#14 Wofford #11 Gonzaga #2 Florida	W 74–66; W 89–67; L 74–83 ^{OT}
2012	#14	First Four; First Round	#14 Iona #3 Marquette	W 78–72; L 68–88
2014	#10	First Round	#7 Oregon	L 68–87
2015	#11	First Four	#11 Ole Miss	L 90–94
2021	#6	First Round	#11 UCLA	L 62–73
2024	#6	First Round	#11 Duquesne	L 67–71
2025	#6	First Round; Second Round; Sweet Sixteen	#11 VCU #3 Wisconsin #2 Alabama	W 80–71; W 91–89; L 88–113
2026	#6	First Round	#11 Texas	L 71–77

=== NIT ===
BYU has made the National Invitation Tournament fifteen times, going 19–13. The Cougars were champions in 1951 and 1966.

Year	Round	Opponent	Result
1951	Quarterfinals; Semifinals; Final	Saint Louis; Seton Hall; Dayton	W 75–68; W 69–59; W 62–43
1953	First Round	Niagara	L 76–82
1954	First Round	Saint Francis	L 68–81
1966	Quarterfinals; Semifinals; Final	Temple; Army; NYU	W 90–78; W 66–60; W 97–84
1982	First Round	Washington	L 63–66
1986	First Round; Second Round; Quarterfinals	SMU; UC Irvine; Ohio State	W 67–63; W 93–80; L 68–79
1994	First Round; Second Round	Arizona State; Fresno State	W 74–67; L 66–68
2000	First Round; Second Round; Quarterfinals	Bowling Green; Southern Illinois; Notre Dame	W 81–54; W 82–57; L 52–64
2002	First Round; Second Round	UC Irvine; Memphis	W 78–55; L 69–80
2006	First Round	Houston	L 67–77
2013	First Round; Second Round; Quarterfinals; Semifinals	Washington; Mercer; Southern Miss; Baylor	W 90–79; W 90–71; W 79–62; L 70–76
2016	First Round; Second Round; Quarterfinals; Semifinals	UAB; Virginia Tech; Creighton; Valparaiso	W 97–79; W 80–77; W 88–82; L 70–72
2017	First Round	UT Arlington	L 89–105
2018	First Round	Stanford	L 83–86
2022	First Round; Second Round; Quarterfinals	Long Beach State; Northern Iowa; Washington State	W 93–72; W 90–71; L 58–77

=== NAIA Tournament ===
BYU made two appearances in the NAIA Tournament, going 2–2.

Year	Round	Opponent	Result
1948	First Round; Second Round	Delta State; Indiana State	W 66–61 ^{OT} L 68–82
1949	First Round; Second Round	Northwestern Oklahoma State; Northwestern State	W 79–50; L 57–59

== Individual honors ==
=== Retired numbers ===
The Cougars have retired the numbers of five players in their history, with the most recent being the jersey of Jimmer Fredette on February 14, 2026.

BYU Cougars retired numbers
No.	Player	Position	Career	No. ret.	Ref.
11	Krešimir Ćosić	C	1970–1973	2006	
11	Roland Minson	SF	1948–1951	2013	
14	Mel Hutchins	PF / C	1947–1951	2013	
22	Danny Ainge	SG	1977–1981	2003	
32	Jimmer Fredette	PG	2007–2011	2026	

=== National Players of the Year ===
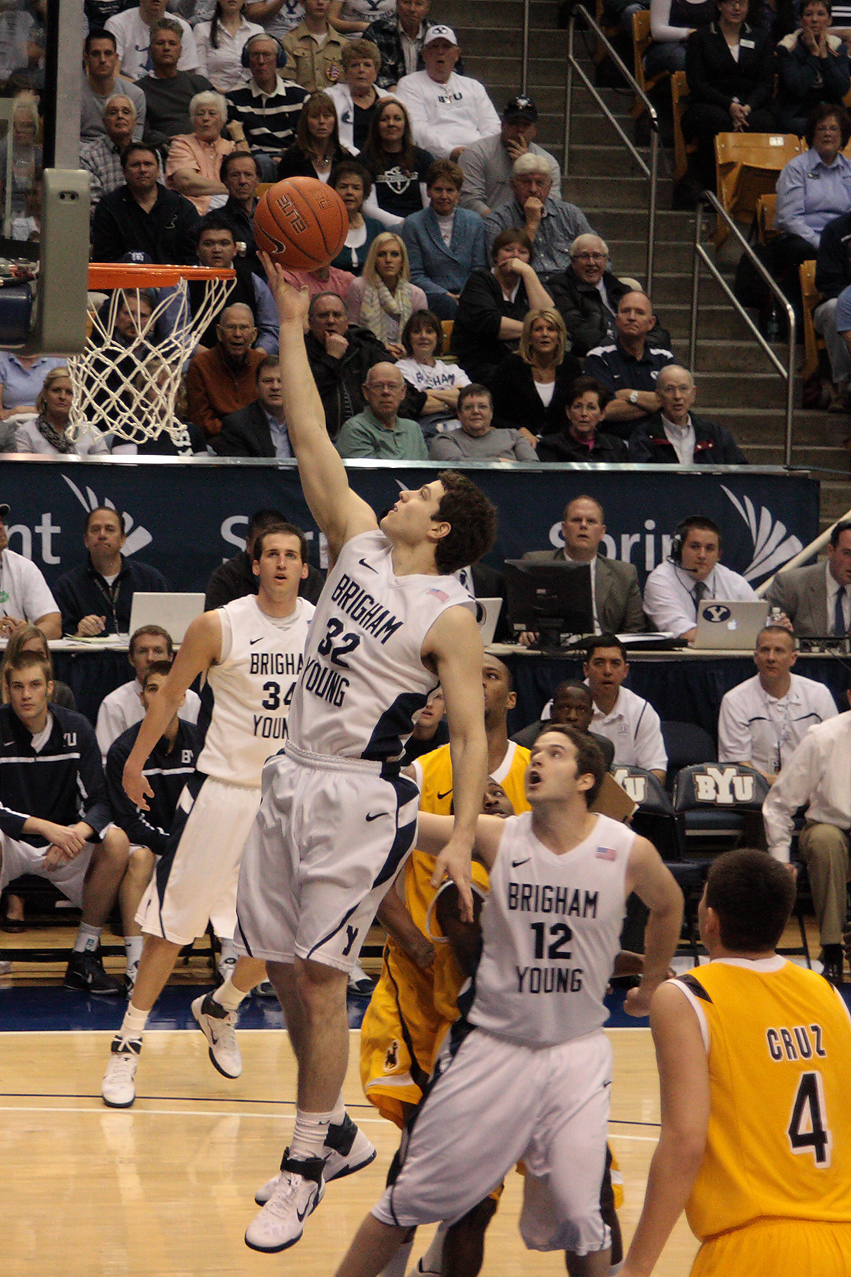
Jimmer Fredette playing for BYU

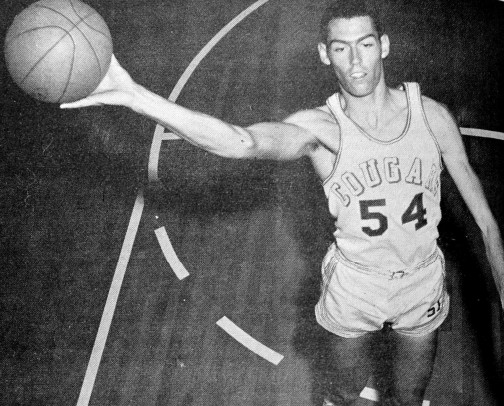
John Fairchild

- Danny Ainge (1981)
- Jimmer Fredette (2011)

=== Julius Erving Award ===
- AJ Dybantsa (2026)

=== All-Americans ===
- Elwood Romney (1931–32)
- Mel Hutchins (1951)
- Roland Minson (1951)
- Joe Richey (1953)
- John Fairchild (1965)
- Dick Nemelka (1966)
- Krešimir Ćosić (1972–73)
- Danny Ainge (1980–81)
- Devin Durrant (1984)
- Michael Smith (1988)
- Jimmer Fredette (2010–11)
- AJ Dybantsa (2025-26)

=== Conference Players of the Year ===
- John Fairchild (1965)
- Danny Ainge (1981)
- Devin Durrant (1983)
- Timo Saarelainen (1985)
- Michael Smith (1988)
- Mekeli Wesley (2001)
- Rafael Araújo (2004)
- Keena Young (2007)
- Lee Cummard (2008)
- Jimmer Fredette (2011)
- Tyler Haws (2014)
- Kyle Collinsworth (2015)

== Individual records ==
- Points scored, single game: 52, Jimmer Fredette, March 11, 2011 vs. New Mexico
- Points scored, season: 1,068, Jimmer Fredette, 2010–11
- Points scored, career: 2,720, Tyler Haws, 2009–10, 2012–15
- Field goals made, single game: 22, Jimmer Fredette, March 11, 2011, vs. New Mexico
- Field goals made, season: 346, Jimmer Fredette, 2010–11
- Field goals made, career: 987, Danny Ainge, 1978–81
- Three-point field goals made, single game: 10, Chase Fischer, November 25, 2014, vs. Chaminade; and Nick Emery, February 11, 2016, vs. San Francisco
- Three-point field goals made, season: 124, Jimmer Fredette, 2010–11
- Three-point field goals made, career: 296, Jimmer Fredette, 2007–11
- Consecutive games with a Three-point field goal made: 31, Nick Emery
- Free throws made, single game: 23, Jimmer Fredette, March 11, 2010, vs. TCU
- Free throws made, season: 252, Jimmer Fredette, 2010–11
- Free throws made, career: 724, Tyler Haws, 2009–10, 2012–15
- Rebounds, single game: 27, Scott Warner, December 18, 1969 vs. Texas Tech
- Rebounds, season: 471, Mel Hutchins, 1950–51
- Rebounds, career: 1,053, Yoeli Childs, 2016–20
- Assists, single game: 16, Mike May, December 11, 1976, vs. Niagara
- Assists, season: 275, Kyle Collinsworth, 2015–16
- Assists, career: 703, Kyle Collinsworth, 2010–11, 2013–16
- Steals, single game: 9, Mark Bigelow, November 28, 1998, vs. Arizona
- Steals, season: 101, Jackson Emery, 2010–11
- Steals, career: 249, Jackson Emery, 2005–06, 2008–11
- Blocked shots, single game: 14, Shawn Bradley, December 7, 1990 vs. Eastern Kentucky
- Blocked shots, season: 177, Shawn Bradley, 1990–91
- Blocked shots, career: 208, Greg Kite, 1979–83

== Notable players ==
- Danny Ainge
- Shawn Bradley
- Elijah Bryant
- Krešimir Ćosić
- Egor Dëmin
- AJ Dybantsa
- Jimmer Fredette
- Travis Hansen
- Greg Kite
