= 1950–51 Indiana Hoosiers men's basketball team =

American college basketball season

1950–51 Indiana Hoosiers men's basketball
- Conference: Big Ten Conference

Ranking
- Coaches: No. 8
- AP: No. 7
- Record: 19–3 (12–2 Big Ten)
- Head coach: Branch McCracken (10th season)
- Assistant coaches: Ernie Andres; Lou Watson
- Captain: Bill Tosheff
- Home arena: The Fieldhouse

1950–51 Big Ten Conference men's basketball standings
	Conf.				Overall
Team	W		L	PCT	W		L	PCT
No. 5 Illinois	13	–	1	.929	22	–	5	.815
No. 7 Indiana	12	–	2	.857	19	–	3	.864
Iowa	9	–	5	.643	15	–	7	.682
Minnesota	7	–	7	.500	13	–	9	.591
Northwestern	7	–	7	.500	12	–	10	.545
Wisconsin	7	–	7	.500	10	–	12	.455
Michigan State	5	–	9	.357	10	–	11	.476
Purdue	4	–	10	.286	8	–	14	.364
Michigan	3	–	11	.214	7	–	15	.318
Ohio State	3	–	11	.214	6	–	16	.273
Rankings from AP Poll

The 1950–51 Indiana Hoosiers men's basketball team represented Indiana University. Their head coach was Branch McCracken, who was in his 10th year. The team played its home games in The Fieldhouse in Bloomington, Indiana, and was a member of the Big Ten Conference.

The Hoosiers finished the regular season with an overall record of 19–3 and a conference record of 12–2, finishing 2nd in the Big Ten Conference. Indiana was not invited to participate in any postseason tournament.

== Roster ==
No.	Name	Position	Ht.	Year	Hometown
4	Dale Vieau	G	5–10	Jr.	Hammond, Indiana
5	Sam Miranda	G	5–10	Jr.	Collinsville, Illinois
6	Tom Satter	F	5–10	So.	Franklin, Indiana
7	Gene Ring	G	6–1	Sr.	South Bend, Indiana
8	Bill Garrett	C	6–3	Sr.	Shelbyville, Indiana
9	Bob Masters	G	6–3	Jr.	Lafayette, Indiana
10	Dick Baumgartner	G	6–1	So.	LaPorte, Indiana
11	Bill Tosheff	F	6–1	Sr.	Gary, Indiana
12	Phil Buck	F	5–10	Sr.	Rossville, Indiana
14	Hal Summers	F	6–1	Jr.	Lawrenceville, Illinois
16	Don Luft	C	6–5	Jr.	Sheboygan, Wisconsin
16	Bob Dobson	G	6–1	So.	Bloomington, Indiana
18	Jack McDermond	F	6–2	So.	Attica, Indiana
19	Jim Schooley	C	6–5	So.	Auburn, Indiana
21	Tyrie Robbins	F	6–3	Sr.	Gary, Indiana
21	Otto Case	G	5–8	So.	Jeffersonville, Indiana
22	Jack Brown	F	6–3	Sr.	Bloomington, Indiana
25	Tony Hill	F	6–1	Jr.	Seymour, Indiana

== Schedule/results ==
Date time, TV	Rank^{#}	Opponent^{#}	Result	Record	Site city, state
Regular season
12/2/1950*		DePauw	W 59–45	1–0	The Fieldhouse; Bloomington, Indiana
12/9/1950*		Oregon State	W 72–45	2–0	The Fieldhouse; Bloomington, Indiana
12/12/1950*		TCU	W 87–68	3–0	The Fieldhouse; Bloomington, Indiana
12/16/1950*		at Kansas State	W 58–52	4–0	Ahearn Field House; Manhattan, Kansas
12/22/1950*	No. 4	at Butler; Hoosier Classic	W 61–46	5–0	Butler Fieldhouse; Indianapolis
12/23/1950*	No. 4	vs. Notre Dame; Hoosier Classic	W 64–56	6–0	Butler Fieldhouse; Indianapolis
12/27/1950*	No. 5	at Bradley	L 62–64	6–1	Robertson Memorial Field House; Peoria, Illinois
12/29/1950*	No. 5	at Drake	W 59–49	7–1	Drake Fieldhouse; Des Moines, IA
1/6/1951	No. 6	at Ohio State	W 77–62	8–1 (1–0)	Ohio Expo Center Coliseum; Columbus, Ohio
1/13/1951	No. 6	at Michigan State	W 47–37	9–1 (2–0)	Jenison Fieldhouse; East Lansing, Michigan
1/15/1951	No. 6	Illinois; Rivalry	W 64–53	10–1 (3–0)	The Fieldhouse; Bloomington, Indiana
1/20/1951	No. 6	at Purdue; Rivalry	W 77–56	11–1 (4–0)	Lambert Fieldhouse; West Lafayette, Indiana
1/22/1951	No. 6	Ohio State	W 69–59	12–1 (5–0)	The Fieldhouse; Bloomington, Indiana
1/27/1951	No. 5	Minnesota	W 32–26	13–1 (6–0)	The Fieldhouse; Bloomington, Indiana
2/10/1951	No. 3	at Minnesota	L 54–61	13–2 (6–1)	Williams Arena; Minneapolis
2/12/1951	No. 3	at Iowa	W 63–54	14–2 (7–1)	Iowa Field House; Iowa City, IA
2/17/1951	No. 6	Northwestern	W 94–63	15–2 (8–1)	The Fieldhouse; Bloomington, Indiana
2/19/1951	No. 6	at Illinois; Rivalry	L 65–71	15–3 (8–2)	Huff Hall; Champaign, Illinois
2/24/1951	No. 4	Purdue; Rivalry	W 68–53	16–3 (9–2)	The Fieldhouse; Bloomington, Indiana
2/26/1951	No. 4	Iowa	W 63–53	17–3 (10–2)	The Fieldhouse; Bloomington, Indiana
3/3/1951	No. 7	at Michigan	W 57–42	18–3 (11–2)	Yost Field House; Ann Arbor, Michigan
3/5/1951	No. 7	Wisconsin	W 68–58	19–3 (12–2)	The Fieldhouse; Bloomington, Indiana
*Non-conference game. ^{#}Rankings from AP Poll. (#) Tournament seedings in parentheses.
