= Sonny Gordon =

American football player (1965–2023)

No. 31, 18, 16
- Position: Defensive back

Personal information
- Born: July 30, 1965; Lynn, Massachusetts, U.S.
- Died: April 26, 2023 (aged 57); Dublin, Ohio, U.S.
- Listed height: 5 ft 11 in (1.80 m)
- Listed weight: 192 lb (87 kg)

Career information
- High school: Middletown (Ohio)
- College: Ohio State
- NFL draft: 1987: 6th round, 157th overall pick

Career history
- Cincinnati Bengals (1987)*; Tampa Bay Buccaneers (1987); Hamilton Tiger-Cats (1989–1990); Saskatchewan Roughriders (1991)
- * Offseason or practice squad member only

Awards and highlights
- Third-team All-American (1986); First-team All-Big Ten (1986)
- Stats at Pro Football Reference

Denman Preston Gordon (July 30, 1965 – April 26, 2023) was an American professional football player who was a defensive back in the National Football League (NFL) and Canadian Football League (CFL).

Gordon was born in Lynn, Massachusetts, but attended Middletown High School in Ohio. He was both a basketball and football standout, as well as president of his senior class.

He played collegiately for the Ohio State Buckeyes, where, as a senior, he was honored by Gannett News Service as a third-team All-American.

Pre-draft measurables
Height	Weight	Arm length	Hand span	40-yard dash	10-yard split	20-yard split	Vertical jump	Broad jump	Bench press
5 ft 10 1/2 in (1.79 m)	195 lb (88 kg)	31 1/4 in (0.79 m)	9 in (0.23 m)	4.60 s	1.56 s	2.66 s	30.5 in (0.77 m)	8 ft 10 in (2.69 m)	19 reps
All values from NFL Combine

Gordon was selected by his hometown Cincinnati Bengals in the sixth round of the 1987 NFL draft, but was released at the final roster cuts. He signed with the Tampa Bay Buccaneers, and appeared in seven games for them.

Gordon was out of professional football during the 1988 season, but joined the Hamilton Tiger-Cats of the CFL the following year. He appeared in 33 games for the Tiger-Cats, over the course of two seasons, recording four interceptions, three of which he returned for touchdowns. He finished his career playing a single season with the Saskatchewan Roughriders in 1991.

Gordon died from amyotrophic lateral sclerosis, in Dublin, Ohio, on April 26, 2023. He was 57.
