= 1951 NCAA basketball championship game =

1951 NCAA Tournament Championship Game
National championship game
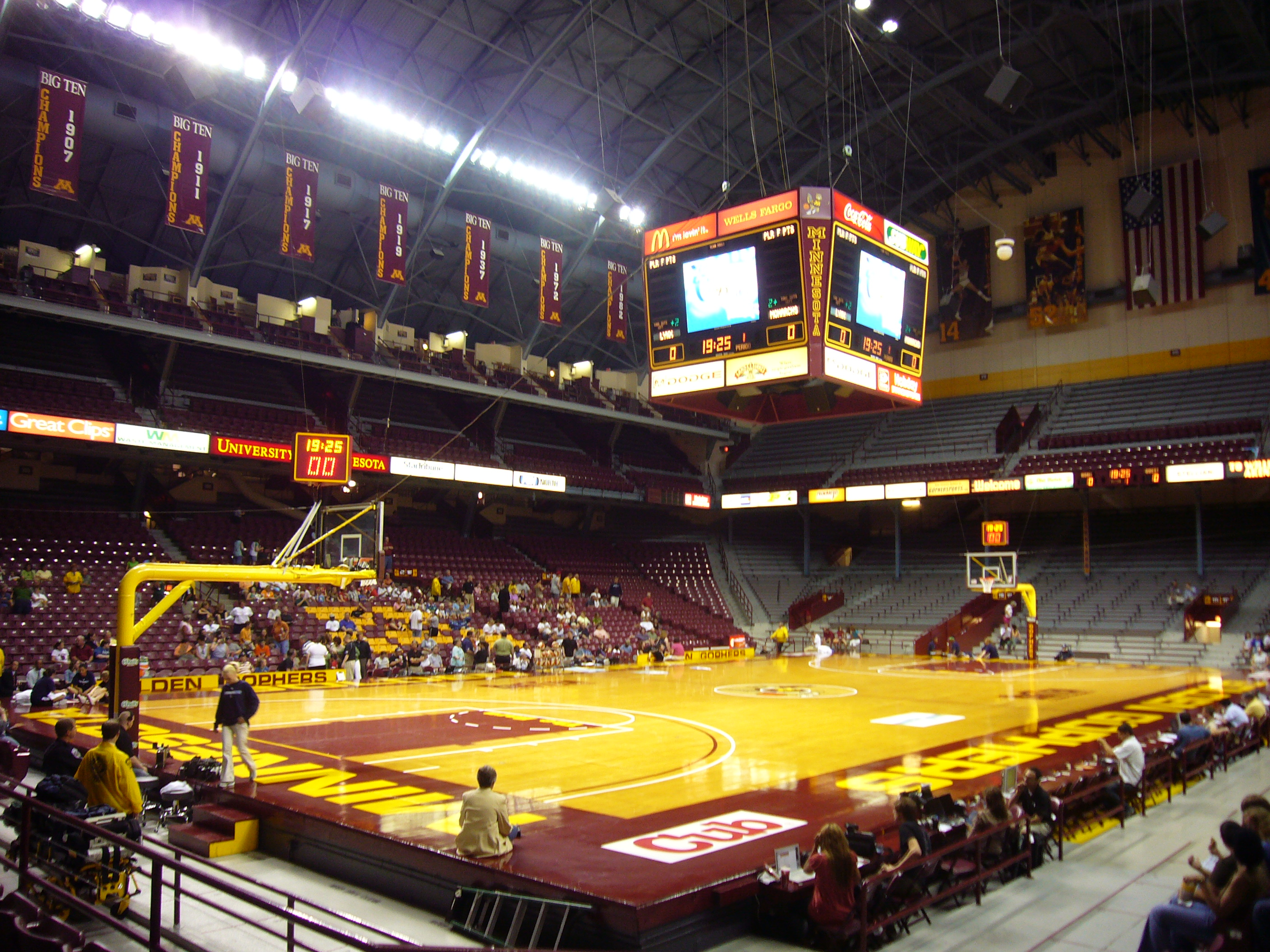
- Williams Arena in Minneapolis, Minnesota, hosted the championship game.
| Kentucky Wildcats | Kansas State Wildcats |
| SEC | Big Seven |
| (31-2) | (25-3) |
|---|---|
| 68 | 58 |
| Head coach: Adolph Rupp | Head coach: Jack Gardner |
- AP: 1
- Coaches: 1
- AP: 4
- Coaches: 3
| | 1st half | 2nd half | Total |
|---|---|---|---|
| Kentucky Wildcats | 27 | 41 | 68 |
| Kansas State Wildcats | 29 | 29 | 58 |
- Date: March 27, 1951
- Venue: Williams Arena, Minneapolis, Minnesota
- MVP: Bill Spivey, Kentucky

The 1951 NCAA University Division Basketball Championship Game was the finals of the 1951 NCAA basketball tournament and it determined the national champion for the 1950-51 NCAA men's basketball season. The game was played on March 27, 1951, at Williams Arena in Minneapolis, Minnesota. It featured the Kentucky Wildcats of the Southeastern Conference, and the Kansas State Wildcats of the Big Seven Conference.

As of 2024, this remains Kansas State's sole appearance in the national championship game.

== Participating teams ==
=== Kentucky Wildcats ===
- East
  - Kentucky 79, Louisville 68
  - Kentucky 59, St. John's 43
- Final Four
  - Kentucky 76, Illinois 74

=== Kansas State Wildcats ===
- West
  - Kansas State 61, Arizona 59
  - Kansas State 64, BYU 54
- Final Four
  - Kansas State 68, Oklahoma A&M 44

== Game summary ==
March 27, 1951

#1 Kentucky Wildcats 68, #4 Kansas State Wildcats 58
Scoring by half: 27-29, 41-29
| Pts: Bill Spivey 22; Rebs: Bill Spivey 21 | Pts: Lew Hitch 13; Rebs: Lew Hitch 9 |

Williams Arena, Minneapolis, Minnesota
