= 1970–71 BYU Cougars men's basketball team =

American college basketball season

1970–71 BYU Cougars men's basketball

WAC Regular season champion

NCAA Tournament
- Conference: Western Athletic Conference
- Record: 18-11 (10-4 WAC)
- Head coach: Stan Watts
- Home arena: Smith Fieldhouse

1970–71 WAC men's basketball standings
	Conf.				Overall
Team	W		L	PCT	W		L	PCT
BYU	10	–	4	.714	18	–	11	.621
UTEP	9	–	5	.643	15	–	10	.600
Utah	9	–	5	.643	15	–	11	.577
Arizona State	8	–	6	.571	16	–	10	.615
Colorado State	7	–	7	.500	15	–	10	.600
Wyoming	6	–	8	.429	10	–	15	.400
New Mexico	4	–	10	.286	14	–	12	.538
Arizona	3	–	11	.214	10	–	16	.385
Rankings from AP Poll

The 1970–71 BYU Cougars men's basketball team represented Brigham Young University in the 1970–71 college basketball season. This was head coach Stan Watts's 22nd season at BYU. The Cougars finished the regular season with a record of 18–11, 10–4 in the Western Athletic Conference.

== Roster ==
1970–71 BYU Cougars men's basketball team
Players
Coaches

Pos.	#	Name	Height	Weight	Year	Hometown
F	42	Clyde Baker	6 ft 7 in (2.01 m)	200 lb (91 kg)	Jr	Ogden, Utah
C	55	Jay Bunker	6 ft 8 in (2.03 m)	210 lb (95 kg)	So	Escondido, California
C	11	Kresimir Cosic	6 ft 10 in (2.08 m)	190 lb (86 kg)	So	Zadar, Yugoslavia
G	32	Bernie Fryer	6 ft 3 in (1.91 m)	165 lb (75 kg)	Jr	Port Angeles, Washington
F	44	Craig Jorgensen	6 ft 8 in (2.03 m)	200 lb (91 kg)	So	Pocatello, Idaho
G	24	Steve Kelly	6 ft 3 in (1.91 m)	180 lb (82 kg)	Sr	Grand Junction, Colo
G	22	Jim Miller	6 ft 5 in (1.96 m)	170 lb (77 kg)	Sr	Las Vegas, Nevada
F	33	Kalevi Sarkalahti	6 ft 8 in (2.03 m)	215 lb (98 kg)	So	Helsinki, Finland
F	40	Phil Tollestrup	6 ft 6 in (1.98 m)	205 lb (93 kg)	Jr	Raymond Alta., Canada

Head coach

- Stan Watts

Assistant coach(es)

Legend

- (C) Team captain
- (S) Suspended
- (I) Ineligible
- (W) Walk-on
- Injured
- Current redshirt

== Schedule ==
Date time, TV	Rank^{#}	Opponent^{#}	Result	Record	Site city, state
Regular season
December 4*		Stanford	W 70–62	1–0	Smith Fieldhouse; Provo, Utah
December 5*		Stanford	W 85–64	2–0	Smith Fieldhouse; Provo, Utah
December 7*		No. 15 New Mexico State	W 86–75	3–0	Smith Fieldhouse; Provo, Utah
December 11*		at No. 9 USC	L 65–101	3–1	L.A. Sports Arena; Los Angeles, California
December 12*		at Oregon State	L 80–99	3–2	Gill Coliseum; Corvallis, Oregon
December 14*		at Seattle	L 80–99	3–3	KeyArena; Seattle, Washington
December 16*		Denver	W 100–72	4–3	Smith Fieldhouse; Provo, Utah
December 19*		No. 15 Utah State	W 111–83	5–3	Smith Fieldhouse; Provo, Utah
December 22*		at Santa Clara	W 68–67	6–3	
December 26*		vs. No. 13 Villanova; Rainbow Classic	W 102–93	7–3	Neal S. Blaisdell Center; Honolulu, Hawaii
December 27*		at Hawaii; Rainbow Classic	L 90–94	7–4	Neal S. Blaisdell Center; Honolulu, Hawaii
January 8		at New Mexico	W 72–62	8–4 (1–0)	University Arena; Albuquerque, NM
January 9		at UTEP	L 64–66	8–5 (1–1)	Memorial Gym; El Paso, Texas
January 15		Colorado State	W 75–73	9–5 (2–1)	Smith Fieldhouse; Provo, Utah
January 16		Wyoming	W 82–68	10–5 (3–1)	Smith Fieldhouse; Provo, Utah
January 23*		at Utah State	L 70–72	10–6 (3–1)	Dee Glen Smith Spectrum; Logan, Utah
January 28		at Arizona State	L 86–87	10–7 (3–2)	Sun Devil Gymnasium; Tempe, Arizona
January 30		at Arizona	L 76–81	10–8 (3–3)	Bear Down Gym; Tucson, Arizona
February 6		Utah	W 103–89	11–8 (4–3)	Smith Fieldhouse; Provo, Utah
February 11		UTEP	W 75–48	12–8 (5–3)	Smith Fieldhouse; Provo, Utah
February 13		New Mexico	W 70–68	13–8 (6–3)	Smith Fieldhouse; Provo, Utah
February 19		at Wyoming	L 72–78	13–9 (6–4)	War Memorial Fieldhouse; Laramie, Wyoming
February 20		at Colorado State	W 98–92	14–9 (7–4)	Moby Arena; Fort Collins, Colorado
February 26		Arizona	W 95–83	15–9 (8–4)	Smith Fieldhouse; Provo, Utah
February 27		Arizona State	W 83–74	16–9 (9–4)	Smith Fieldhouse; Provo, Utah
March 6		at Utah	W 98–87	17–9 (10–4)	Jon M. Huntsman Center; Salt Lake City, Utah
NCAA tournament
March 13		vs. Utah State; NCAA Tournament • First Round	W 91–82	18–9 (10–4)	Dee Glen Smith Spectrum; Logan, Utah
March 18		vs. UCLA; NCAA Tournament • Semifinal	L 73–91	18–10 (10–4)	Jon M. Huntsman Center; Salt Lake City, Utah
March 20		vs. Pacific; NCAA Tournament • Third Place	L 81–84	18–11 (10–4)	Jon M. Huntsman Center; Salt Lake City, Utah
*Non-conference game. ^{#}Rankings from AP Poll. (#) Tournament seedings in parentheses.

== Team players drafted into the NBA ==
Round	Pick	Player	NBA club
7	113	Steve Kelly	Detroit Pistons
