= 2001 Mountain West Conference men's basketball tournament =

- Classification: Division I
- Season: 2000–01
- Teams: 7
- Site: Thomas & Mack Center; Paradise, NV
- Champions: BYU (1st title)
- MVP: Mekeli Wesley (BYU)

2000–01 Mountain West Conference men's basketball standings
	Conf.				Overall
Team	W		L	PCT	W		L	PCT
Utah	10	–	4	.714	19	–	12	.613
BYU †	10	–	4	.714	24	–	9	.727
Wyoming	10	–	4	.714	20	–	10	.667
UNLV	7	–	7	.500	16	–	13	.552
New Mexico	6	–	8	.429	21	–	13	.618
Colorado State	6	–	8	.429	15	–	13	.536
San Diego State	4	–	10	.286	14	–	14	.500
Air Force	3	–	11	.214	8	–	21	.276
† 2001 Mountain West tournament winner Rankings from AP Poll

The 2001 Mountain West Conference men's basketball tournament was played at the Thomas & Mack Center in Las Vegas, Nevada from March 8–10, 2001. Only 7 of the conference's 8 member schools would compete in the tournament. Host school UNLV was banned from postseason play in the wake of rules violations while recruiting Lamar Odom that ultimately led to the ouster of head coach Bill Bayno. The format of the tournament was temporarily changed, giving regular season champion Utah a quarterfinal bye to await the winner of the New Mexico-Colorado State game. Of note, this marked the first time that UNLV failed to appear in the championship game of the league tournament while held at the Thomas & Mack Center. As of 2011, eleven MWC Tournaments had been held in Las Vegas, with UNLV appearing in all but three championship games (2001, 2009).

Second seeded BYU would win the tournament and the league's automatic NCAA Tournament bid with a 69–65 win over #5 seed New Mexico.

== Bracket ==
Quarterfinals; March 8
4	New Mexico	76
5	Colorado State	65
3	Wyoming	73
6	San Diego State	58
2	BYU	69
7	Air Force	54

Semifinals; March 9
1	Utah	53
5	New Mexico	56
3	Wyoming	66
2	BYU	77

Finals; March 10
5	New Mexico	65
2	BYU	69
