= Middletown High School (Ohio) =

Public, coeducational high school in Middletown, Ohio, United States

Location
- 601 North Breiel Boulevard; Middletown, (Butler County), Ohio 45042; United States; 39°31′21″N 84°20′56″W

Information
- Type: Public high school secondary school
- School district: Middletown City School District
- Superintendent: G. Elgin Card
- Principal: Donetrus Hill
- Teaching staff: 89.48 (on an FTE basis)
- Grades: 9–12
- Gender: Co-educational
- Student to teacher ratio: 18.43
- Colors: Purple & White
- Slogan: Middie Magic
- Athletics conference: Greater Miami Conference
- Team name: Middies
- Website: School Website

Middletown High School is a four-year public high school in Middletown, Ohio. It is the only public high school in the Middletown City School District.

The present location of the school was established in the fall of 1969, being moved from its original location at 1415 Girard Avenue. The old high school was converted to Middletown Middle School for the remainder of its existence until demolished in September 2018.

In 2016, a $96 million renovation project began on the high school, updating the building and arena, as well as adding a new middle school building adjacent to it. The new Wade E. Miller Arena was completed and opened in December 2017, and the rest of the building, as well as the new middle school, officially opened in August 2018.

== Ohio High School Athletic Association State Championships ==
- Boys Basketball – 1944, 1946, 1947, 1952, 1953, 1956, 1957. The Middies' seven boys basketball state championships was the most of any High School in Ohio until Akron St. Vincent-St. Mary broke the record with their eighth championship in 2018.
- Boys Cross Country – 2004
- Boys Track and Field – 2002

== Notable alumni ==
- Herb Davis (1917), NFL player
- Sam T. Selby (1928), college basketball and football coach
- Les Pugh (1941), NBA player
- Tom Blake (1945), NFL offensive lineman
- Shelby Linville (1948), basketball player who played for the Kentucky Wildcats
- John M. Watson, Sr. (1954), jazz musician and actor
- Jerry Lucas (1958), NBA Hall of Famer and Olympic Gold Medalist
- Clarence Page (1965), Pulitzer Prize winning journalist
- John Holland (1970), NFL wide receiver
- Archie Aldridge (1973), basketball player who played overseas
- Butch Carter (1976), NBA player and head coach
- Todd Bell (1977), NFL All-Pro safety
- Sonny Gordon (1983), NFL defensive back
- Cris Carter (1984), NFL Hall of Fame wide receiver
- Dave Swartzbaugh (1986), MLB pitcher
- Jeff Cothran (1989), NFL fullback
- Darrell Hunter (2002), NFL defensive back
- JD Vance (2003), 50th vice president of the United States
- Phillip Barnett (2008), professional football wide receiver
- Kayla Harrison (2008), Olympic Gold Medalist in judo, and UFC champion
- Kyle Schwarber (2011), MLB All-Star outfielder for the Philadelphia Phillies
- Jalin Marshall (2013), NFL wide receiver
- Vincent Edwards (2014), NBA player
