= Stan Watts =

American basketball player and coach (1911–2000)

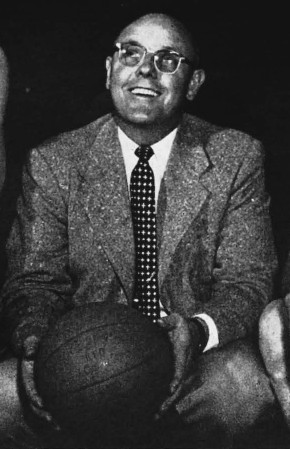
- Watts, circa 1956

Biographical details
- Born: August 30, 1911; Murray, Utah, U.S.
- Died: April 6, 2000 (aged 88)
- Education: BYU

Coaching career (HC unless noted)

Basketball
- 1938–?: Millard High HS (UT)
- 1941–1945: Dixie (UT)
- 1945–1947: Jordan HS (UT)
- 1947–1949: BYU (freshmen)
- 1949–1972: BYU

Football
- 1941–1942: Dixie (UT)

Baseball
- 1948: BYU

Administrative career (AD unless noted)
- 1970–1976: BYU

Head coaching record
- Overall: 371–254 (college basketball); 3–3 (college baseball)
- Tournaments: Basketball; 4–10 (NCAA University Division); 6–2 (NIT)

Accomplishments and honors

Championships
- Basketball; 2 NIT (1951, 1966); 3 MSC regular season (1950, 1951, 1957); 5 WAC regular season (1965, 1967, 1969, 1971, 1972)
- Basketball Hall of Fame; Inducted in 1986 (profile)
- College Basketball Hall of Fame; Inducted in 2006

Stanley H. Watts (August 30, 1911 – April 6, 2000) was an American basketball coach. He served as the head basketball coach at Brigham Young University (BYU) from 1949 to 1972. The Murray, Utah native was inducted into the Naismith Memorial Basketball Hall of Fame in 1986.

Watts became the sixth coach in history to win 100 games in his first five years. Watts' BYU teams were disciplined and well-drilled units that favored an up-tempo style and relentless defensive pressure. In 23 seasons, Watts compiled a 371–254 (.594) record and established a strong basketball tradition and a national athletic identity for the school representing the Church of Jesus Christ of Latter-Day Saints. His Cougars teams won eight conference titles, appeared in 11 postseason tournaments, and captured the 1951 and 1966 National Invitation Tournament championships.

Watts began his coaching career in 1938 at Millard High, then coached Dixie Junior College from 1941 to 1945 and Jordan High School from 1945 to 1947. Watts was chosen as BYU's freshman coach in 1947 and inherited the varsity team in 1949. Watts' book, Developing an Offensive Attack in Basketball (1958), became a standard manual on the fast break offense. From 1965 to 1966, Watts' "Runnin' Cougars" scored more than 100 points 21 times and at least 95 points 32 times. Watts' teaching skills were in constant demand at coaching clinics across the nation and in Europe, the Far East and South Africa. Watts served his coaching organization, the National Association of Basketball Coaches (NABC), on numerous committees. He served on the Board of Directors from 1958 to 1968 and as president in 1970.

== Head coaching record ==
=== College basketball ===
Record table
Season	Team	Overall	Conference	Standing	Postseason
BYU Cougars (Mountain States Conference) (1949–1962)
1949–50	BYU	22–12	14–6	1st	NCAA Regional Fourth Place
1950–51	BYU	28–9	15–5	1st	NCAA Regional Fourth Place, NIT Champion
1951–52	BYU	14–10	9–5	T–2nd	
1952–53	BYU	22–8	11–3	2nd	NIT first round
1953–54	BYU	18–11	9–5	3rd	NIT first round
1954–55	BYU	13–13	10–4	2nd	
1955–56	BYU	18–8	10–4	2nd	
1956–57	BYU	19–9	11–3	1st	NCAA University Division Regional Third Place
1957–58	BYU	13–13	9–5	T–2nd	
1958–59	BYU	15–11	8–6	4th	
1959–60	BYU	8–17	5–9	5th	
1960–61	BYU	15–11	9–5	3rd	
1961–62	BYU	10–16	5–9	T–4th	
BYU Cougars (Western Athletic Conference) (1962–1972)
1962–63	BYU	12–14	6–4	2nd	
1963–64	BYU	13–12	5–5	3rd	
1964–65	BYU	21–7	8–2	1st	NCAA University Division Regional Third Place
1965–66	BYU	20–5	6–4	2nd	NIT Champion
1966–67	BYU	14–10	8–2	T–1st	
1967–68	BYU	13–12	4–6	T–4th	
1968–69	BYU	16–12	6–4	T–1st	NCAA University Division first round
1969–70	BYU	8–18	4–10	7th	
1970–71	BYU	18–11	10–4	1st	NCAA University Division Regional Fourth Place
1971–72	BYU	21–5	12–2	1st	NCAA University Division first round
BYU:		371–254	194–112		
Total:		371–254			
National champion Postseason invitational champion Conference regular season champion Conference regular season and conference tournament champion Division regular season champion Division regular season and conference tournament champion Conference tournament champion
