= Shelby Linville =

American basketball player

Personal information
- Born: November 8, 1929 Dayton, Kentucky, U.S.
- Died: August 5, 2008 (aged 78) Middletown, Ohio, U.S.
- Listed height: 6 ft 5 in (1.96 m)
- Listed weight: 200 lb (91 kg)

Career information
- High school: Middletown (Middletown, Ohio)
- College: Kentucky (1949–1952)
- NBA draft: 1952: undrafted
- Position: Forward

Career highlights
- NCAA champion (1951); Second-team All-SEC (1951)

Shelby E. Linville (November 8, 1929 – August 5, 2008) was an American basketball player and educator best known for his college career at the University of Kentucky.

Linville was born in Dayton, Kentucky and moved to Middletown, Ohio at 15. He starred at Middletown High School, where he led the team to two state championships.

Following his standout college career, Linville first attended Miami University and then transferred to Kentucky to play for Adolph Rupp. He played three seasons at Kentucky, with his best being his junior year, where he averaged 10.4 points per game and helped lead the 1950–51 Wildcats to the 1951 National Championship. Linville had a strong NCAA tournament showing, making the All-Final Four team alongside teammate Bill Spivey.

After graduating in 1952, Linville became a high school teacher, coach and administrator. He was also a Baptist minister.

Linville died on August 5, 2008.
