= 1950–51 Wisconsin Badgers men's basketball team =

American college basketball season

1950–51 Wisconsin Badgers men's basketball
- Conference: Big Ten Conference
- Record: 10–12 (7–7 Big Ten)
- Head coach: Harold E. Foster
- Home arena: UW Fieldhouse

1950–51 Big Ten Conference men's basketball standings
	Conf.				Overall
Team	W		L	PCT	W		L	PCT
No. 5 Illinois	13	–	1	.929	22	–	5	.815
No. 7 Indiana	12	–	2	.857	19	–	3	.864
Iowa	9	–	5	.643	15	–	7	.682
Minnesota	7	–	7	.500	13	–	9	.591
Northwestern	7	–	7	.500	12	–	10	.545
Wisconsin	7	–	7	.500	10	–	12	.455
Michigan State	5	–	9	.357	10	–	11	.476
Purdue	4	–	10	.286	8	–	14	.364
Michigan	3	–	11	.214	7	–	15	.318
Ohio State	3	–	11	.214	6	–	16	.273
Rankings from AP Poll

The 1950–51 Wisconsin Badgers men's basketball team represented University of Wisconsin–Madison. The head coach was Harold E. Foster, coaching his seventeenth season with the Badgers. The team played their home games at the UW Fieldhouse in Madison, Wisconsin and was a member of the Big Ten Conference.

== Schedule ==
Date time, TV	Rank^{#}	Opponent^{#}	Result	Record	Site city, state
Regular Season
12/02/1950*		Marquette	W 49–42	1–0	UW Fieldhouse; Madison, Wisconsin
12/08/1950*		Loyola (IL)	L 51–54	1–1	UW Fieldhouse; Madison, Wisconsin
12/11/1950*		at Notre Dame	L 61–67	1–2	Notre Dame Fieldhouse; Notre Dame, Indiana
12/16/1950*		at Marquette	L 58–61	1–3	Marquette Gymnasium; Milwaukee
12/18/1950*		at Kansas State	L 58–77	1–4	Ahearn Field House; Manhattan, Kansas
12/19/1950*		at Saint Louis	L 48–53	1–5	Kiel Auditorium; St. Louis, Missouri
12/28/1950*		San Jose State	W 75–59	2–5	UW Fieldhouse; Madison, Wisconsin
1/01/1951		Illinois	L 69–71 ^{OT}	2–6 (0–1)	UW Fieldhouse; Madison, Wisconsin
1/06/1951		at Michigan	W 61–52	3–6 (1–1)	Yost Field House; Ann Arbor, Michigan
1/08/1951		at Michigan State	W 53–52	4–6 (2–1)	Jenison Fieldhouse; East Lansing, Michigan
1/13/1951		at Ohio State	W 74–67	5–6 (3–1)	Ohio Expo Center Coliseum; Columbus, Ohio
1/15/1951		Northwestern	W 68–56	6–6 (4–1)	UW Fieldhouse; Madison, Wisconsin
2/01/1951*		Butler	W 60–35	7–6	UW Fieldhouse; Madison, Wisconsin
2/03/1951		at Minnesota	W 47–44	8–6 (5–1)	Minnesota Field House; Minneapolis
2/05/1951		Ohio State	W 56–51	9–6 (6–1)	UW Fieldhouse; Madison, Wisconsin
2/10/1951		at Illinois	L 52–63	9–7 (6–2)	Huff Hall; Champaign, Illinois
2/12/1951		at Purdue	L 46–62	9–8 (6–3)	Lambert Fieldhouse; West Lafayette, Indiana
2/17/1951		Iowa	L 60–73	9–9 (6–4)	UW Fieldhouse; Madison, Wisconsin
2/24/1951		Michigan State	W 35–29	10–9 (7–4)	UW Fieldhouse; Madison, Wisconsin
2/26/1951		Michigan	L 50–52	10–10 (7–5)	UW Fieldhouse; Madison, Wisconsin
3/03/1951		Purdue	L 61–64	10–11 (7–6)	UW Fieldhouse; Madison, Wisconsin
3/05/1951		at Indiana	L 58–68	10–12 (7–7)	IU Fieldhouse; Bloomington, Indiana
*Non-conference game. ^{#}Rankings from AP Poll. (#) Tournament seedings in parentheses.
