= Bushton, Illinois =

Bushton
- unincorporated community
- Location within Illinois Location within the United States
- Coordinates: 39°35′32″N 88°08′19″W
- Country: United States
- State: Illinois
- County: Coles
- Township: Morgan

Government
  - Type: Unincorporated community
- Elevation: 669 ft (204 m)
- Time zone: UTC-6 (CST)
  - Summer (DST): UTC-5 (CDT)
- ZIP code: 61920 (Charleston)
- Area code: 217
- GNIS ID: 405287

Bushton is an unincorporated community in Morgan Township, Coles County, Illinois, United States.

== Geography ==
Bushton is located at 39°35′32″N 088°08′19″W at an elevation of 669 feet.

== See also ==
- List of unincorporated communities in Illinois
