= 1951 NCAA basketball tournament =

Edition of US college basketball tournament

- Season: 1950–51
- Teams: 16
- Finals site: Williams Arena, Minneapolis, Minnesota
- Champions: Kentucky Wildcats (3rd title, 3rd title game, 4th Final Four)
- Runner-up: Kansas State Wildcats (1st title game, 2nd Final Four)
- Semifinalists: Illinois Fighting Illini (2nd Final Four); Oklahoma A&M Aggies (4th Final Four)
- Winning coach: Adolph Rupp (3rd title)
- MOP: No winner selected^{[a]}
- Attendance: 110,645
- Top scorer: Don Sunderlage (Illinois) (83 points)

The 1951 NCAA basketball tournament involved 16 schools playing in single-elimination play to determine the national champion of men's NCAA Division I college basketball. The 13th annual edition of the tournament began on March 20, 1951, and ended with the championship game on March 27, at Williams Arena, located on the campus of the University of Minnesota in Minneapolis. A total of 18 games were played, including a third place game in each region and a national third place game.

Kentucky, coached by Adolph Rupp, won the national title with a 68–58 victory over Kansas State, coached by Jack Gardner.

This NCAA tournament was the first with a 16-team field and the first with automatic bids for conference champions, of which there were 10. Only the championship and third place games were held in Minneapolis, while the semifinals were held in the respective regional sites; similar to previous years. A true "Final Four" (semifinals and final at same location) debuted the following year.

The twelve-team National Invitation Tournament (NIT) was held the previous week in New York City at Madison Square Garden, with its championship on Saturday, Mach 17. Four teams competed in both tournaments, including NIT champion BYU; they lost in the quarterfinal round, by ten points to Kansas State.

The three other teams were Arizona, North Carolina State, and St. John's.

== Locations ==
The following are the sites selected to host each round of the 1951 tournament:

=== First round ===
March 20
Madison Square Garden, New York, New York (Host: Metropolitan New York Conference)
Reynolds Coliseum, Raleigh, North Carolina (Host: North Carolina State University)
March 21 and 22
Municipal Auditorium, Kansas City, Missouri (Host: Missouri Valley Conference)

=== Regionals ===
March 22 and 24
East Regional, Madison Square Garden, New York, New York (Host: Metropolitan New York Conference)
March 23 and 24
West Regional, Municipal Auditorium, Kansas City, Missouri (Host: Missouri Valley Conference)

=== Championship Game ===
March 27
Williams Arena, Minneapolis, Minnesota (Hosts: University of Minnesota, Big Ten Conference)

== Teams ==
Region	Team	Coach	Conference	Finished	Final Opponent	Score
East
East	Columbia	Lou Rossini	Ivy League	Sweet Sixteen	Illinois	L 79–71
East	Connecticut	Hugh Greer	Yankee	Sweet Sixteen	St. John's	L 63–52
East	Illinois	Harry Combes	Big Ten	Third Place	Oklahoma A&M	W 61–46
East	Kentucky	Adolph Rupp	Southeastern	Champion	Kansas State	W 68–58
East	Louisville	Peck Hickman	Independent	Sweet Sixteen	Kentucky	L 79–68
East	NC State	Everett Case	Southern	Regional Fourth Place	St. John's	L 71–59
East	St. John's	Frank McGuire	Metro NY	Regional third place	NC State	W 71–59
East	Villanova	Alex Severance	Independent	Sweet Sixteen	NC State	L 67–62
West
West	Arizona	Fred Enke	Border	Sweet Sixteen	Kansas State	L 61–59
West	BYU	Stan Watts	Mountain States	Regional Fourth Place	Washington	L 80–67
West	Kansas State	Jack Gardner	Big 7	Runner-up	Kentucky	L 68–58
West	Montana State	Brick Breeden	Independent	Sweet Sixteen	Oklahoma A&M	L 50–46
West	Oklahoma A&M	Henry Iba	Missouri Valley	Fourth Place	Illinois	L 61–46
West	San Jose State	Walt McPherson	Independent	Sweet Sixteen	BYU	L 68–61
West	Texas A&M	John Floyd	Southwest	Sweet Sixteen	Washington	L 62–40
West	Washington	Tippy Dye	Pacific Coast	Regional third place	BYU	W 80–67

== Bracket ==
=== East Region – New York City ===
First round March 20
New York City
Illinois	79
Columbia	71
Raleigh, North Carolina
NC State	67
Villanova	62
Raleigh, North Carolina
Kentucky	79
Louisville	68
New York City
St John's	63
Connecticut	52

Regional Semifinal; March 22
Illinois	84
NC State	70
Kentucky	59
St John's	43

Regional Final; March 24
Illinois	74
Kentucky	76
Third Place
St John's	71
NC State	59

=== West Region – Kansas City, Missouri ===
First round March 21
Kansas State	61
Arizona	59
BYU	68
San Jose State	61
Oklahoma A&M	50
Montana State	46
Washington	62
Texas A&M	40

Regional Semifinal; March 22
Kansas State	64
BYU	54
Oklahoma A&M	61
Washington	57

Regional Final; March 24
Kansas State	68
Oklahoma A&M	44
Third Place
Washington	80
BYU	67

=== National Finals – Minneapolis, Minnesota ===
National Championship; March 27
Kentucky	68
Kansas State	58

Third place game March 27
Illinois	61
Oklahoma A&M	46

== Notes ==
- ^{a} Despite what some NCAA publications have printed many years later—that Kentucky's Bill Spivey won the 1951 award—no official vote occurred after the game and no player was officially presented as the winner. A news article printed by the Lexington Herald-Leader on April 7, 1951, titled "What Happened To NCAA's MVP Award?" detailed this mysterious divergence of precedent. Reporter Ed Ashford wrote, "For 11 consecutive years a most valuable player was chosen after the NCAA basketball tournament. However this year, for some unexplained reason, no poll was taken and there was no MVP honored. Whether the authorities just forgot about it or decided to eliminate balloting for the honor is not known. If a poll had been taken, it is likely that Kentucky would have garnered its third MVP award in the last four years. Alex Groza won the honor in 1948 and 1949 while Bill Spivey and Shelby Linville would have been strong contenders for the award this year."
