= 1950–51 UCLA Bruins men's basketball team =

American college basketball season

1950–51 UCLA Bruins men's basketball

PCC Southern Division Champion
- Conference: Pacific Coast Conference

Ranking
- Coaches: No. 16
- Record: 19–10 (9–4 PCC)
- Head coach: John R. Wooden (3rd season)
- Assistant coaches: Bill Putnam; Eddie Powell
- Home arena: Men's Gym

1950–51 Pacific Coast Conference men's basketball standings
	Conf.				Overall
Team	W		L	PCT	W		L	PCT
North
No. 15 Washington †	11	–	5	.688	24	–	6	.800
Oregon	10	–	6	.625	18	–	13	.581
Washington State	7	–	9	.438	17	–	15	.531
Idaho	6	–	10	.375	15	–	14	.517
Oregon State	6	–	10	.375	14	–	18	.438
South
UCLA	8	–	4	.667	19	–	10	.655
No. 19 USC	8	–	4	.667	21	–	6	.778
Stanford	5	–	7	.417	12	–	14	.462
California	3	–	9	.250	16	–	16	.500
† Conference playoff series winner Rankings from AP Poll

The 1950–51 UCLA Bruins men's basketball team represented the University of California, Los Angeles during the 1950–51 NCAA men's basketball season and were members of the Pacific Coast Conference. The Bruins were led by third year head coach John Wooden. They finished the regular season with a record of 19–10 and tied for the southern division championship with a record of 9–4. The Bruins lost to the Washington Huskies in the conference play-offs.

== Previous season ==
The Bruins finished the regular season with a record of 24–7 and were southern division champions with a record of 10–2. They defeated the Washington State Cougars in the conference play-offs and lost to Bradley in the NCAA regional semifinals and BYU in the regional consolation game.

== Roster ==
1950–51 UCLA Bruins men's basketball team
Players
Coaches

Pos.	#	Name	Height	Weight	Year	Hometown
G	72	Arthur Alper	—	—	Sr
F	59	Jerry Evans	6 ft 3 in (1.91 m)	—
G	73	Don Johnson	6 ft 3 in (1.91 m)	195 lb (88 kg)	Jr
G	70	Gene Logan	6 ft 1 in (1.85 m)	—
C	39	Grover Luchsinger	—	—
	57	John Matulich	—	—		Sacramento, California
F	52	Jerry Norman	6 ft 0 in (1.83 m)	—	Jr
G	71	Barry Porter	6 ft 1 in (1.85 m)	—	Fr
	53	Bobby Pounds	—	—	Jr
F	54	Dick Ridgway	6 ft 4 in (1.93 m)	—	So
G	75	Eddie Sheldrake (C)	—	—	Sr
C	32	Gene Williams	—	—	Sr

Head coach

John Wooden (Purdue)

Assistant coach(es)

- Eddie Powell (Indiana St)
- Bill Putnam (UCLA)

Legend

- (C) Team captain
- (S) Suspended
- (I) Ineligible
- (W) Walk-on
- Injured
- Current redshirt

Roster
Last update: 30 January 2018

== Schedule ==
Date time, TV	Rank^{#}	Opponent^{#}	Result	Record	Site city, state
Regular Season
December 2, 1950*		Arizona State	W 79–49	1–0	Men's Gym; Los Angeles, CA
December 8, 1950		at Oregon	W 77–55	2–0	McArthur Court; Eugene, OR
December 9, 1950		at Oregon	L 54–72	2–1	McArthur Court; Eugene, OR
December 15, 1950*		Santa Clara	W 71–48	3–1	Men's Gym; Los Angeles, CA
December 16, 1950*		San Jose State	W 82–59	4–1	Men's Gym; Los Angeles, CA
December 19, 1950*	No. 9	at No. 2 Bradley	L 74–79	4–2	Robertson Memorial Field House; Peoria, IL
December 21, 1950*	No. 9	at No. 7 Long Island	L 71–90	4–3	Madison Square Garden; New York, NY
December 23, 1950*	No. 9	at Iowa	L 63–80	4–4	Iowa Field House; Iowa City, IA
December 28, 1950*		Pittsburgh	W 68–44	5–4	Men's Gym; Los Angeles, CA
December 30, 1950*		LSU	W 95–66	6–4	Men's Gym; Los Angeles, CA
January 5, 1951		at Stanford	W 78–73	7–4 (1–0)	Stanford Pavilion; Stanford, CA
January 6, 1951		at Stanford	T 71–71	7–5 (1–1)	Stanford Pavilion; Stanford, CA
January 12, 1951		at No. 19 USC	L 34–53	7–6 (1–2)	Pan-Pacific Auditorium; Los Angeles, CA
January 13, 1951		at No. 19 USC	W 57–44	8–6 (2–2)	Pan-Pacific Auditorium; Los Angeles, CA
January 26, 1951*		vs. No. 14 Arizona	W 69–63	9–6	Cow Palace (6,884); Daly City, CA
January 27, 1951*		at San Francisco	W 75–42	10–6	Cow Palace; Daly City, CA
February 2, 1951	No. 19	Santa Barbara College; Homecoming	W 76–55	11–6	Men's Gym; Los Angeles, CA
February 3, 1951*	No. 19	Pepperdine	W 75–60	12–6	Men's Gym; Los Angeles, CA
February 9, 1951		at California	L 60–62	12–7 (2–3)	Men's Gym; Berkeley, CA
February 10, 1951		at California	W 61–56	13–7 (3–3)	Men's Gym; Berkeley, CA
February 16, 1951		Stanford	W 56–48	14–7 (4–3)	Men's Gym; Los Angeles, CA
February 17, 1951		Stanford	W 90–67	15–7 (5–3)	Men's Gym; Los Angeles, CA
February 23, 1951		California	W 75–57	16–7 (6–3)	Men's Gym; Los Angeles, CA
February 24, 1951		California	W 62–59	17–7 (7–3)	Men's Gym; Los Angeles, CA
March 2, 1951	No. 17	No. 18 USC	W 59–53	18–7 (8–3)	Men's Gym; Los Angeles, CA
March 3, 1951	No. 17	No. 18 USC	L 41–43	18–8 (8–4)	Men's Gym; Los Angeles, CA
Conference Championship
March 5, 1951	No. 17	No. 18 USC; Southern Division play-off	W 49–41	19–8	Men's Gym; Los Angeles, CA
March 9, 1951		at No. 15 Washington; PCC Championship play-offs	L 51–70	19–9	University of Washington Pavilion; Seattle, WA
March 10, 1951		at No. 15 Washington; PCC Championship play-offs	L 54–71	19–10	University of Washington Pavilion; Seattle, WA
*Non-conference game. ^{#}Rankings from AP Poll. (#) Tournament seedings in parentheses. All times are in Pacific Time.
