= Don Johnson (basketball) =

American basketball player and coach (1930–2019)

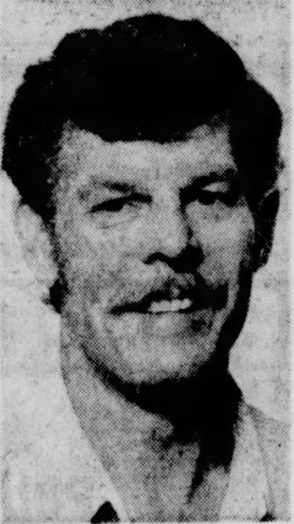
- Johnson c. 1976

Personal information
- Born: 1930
- Died: February 6, 2019 (aged 88)
- Listed height: 6 ft 3 in (1.91 m)
- Listed weight: 195 lb (88 kg)

Career information
- High school: El Monte (El Monte, California)
- College: UCLA (1950–1952)
- Position: Guard
- Number: 73
- Coaching career: 1954–2019

Career history

Coaching
- 1954–1966: El Rancho HS
- 1966–1994: Cypress JC
- 1996–2019: Biola (assistant)

Career highlights
- As player: Honorable mention All-American – UPI (1952); First-team PCC All-Southern Division (1952)

Career coaching record
- Junior college: 588–259 (.694)

Don Johnson (1930 (Note: His age in one source implies that he was born in 1929/1930, while his age in another indicates that it was 1930/1931.) – February 6, 2019) was an American basketball player and coach. He played college basketball for the UCLA Bruins under head coach John Wooden. As a senior, Johnson received honorable mention from United Press International for their All-American team in 1952. He became a junior college coach at Cypress College in Cypress, California, leading the Chargers to a 588–259 record with two state titles and seven conference championships.

At the time of his retirement from Cypress, Johnson had the most wins among California junior college men's basketball coaches. He was inducted into the UCLA Athletics Hall of Fame, and Cypress dedicated its basketball court "Don Johnson Court".

== Playing career ==
After graduating from El Monte High School in El Monte, California, Johnson attended Fullerton College from 1948 to 1950, and he was named the Eastern Conference's most valuable player for the 1949–50 season. He played college basketball at the University of California, Los Angeles. It was early in Bruins coach John Wooden's tenure at the school, about a decade before he would win the first of 11 national championships. Replacing graduated star George Stanich at guard, Johnson led the Bruins to two Southern Division championships in the Pacific Coast Conference (PCC), and he led the team in rebounding in both of his seasons.

As a junior in 1950–51, Johnson averaged 5.2 rebounds per game and received honorable mention for the PCC All-Southern Division team. He averaged 5.8 rebounds in 1951–52, when UCLA won the PCC title and qualified for the 1952 NCAA tournament. He was named a third-team All-American by the Helms Athletic Foundation and earned honorable mention from UPI. (Note: UPI was used to complile the consensus All-American team that year. Helms had also been used in the past (1929–1948).) He and teammate Jerry Norman, the Bruins' co-captains, were unanimous selections for the PCC All-Southern Division team. In 61 career games, Johnson averaged 9.8 points. His 596 points set a UCLA record for players who only played two seasons, breaking Carl Kraushaar's previous high of 543.

Standing at 6 feet 3 inches (1.91 m) and 195 pounds (88 kg), Johnson was among the bigger guards in that era. Wooden said that he "was a well-rounded basketball player. He played good defense, passed the ball well, could drive to the basket and was a pretty good outside shooter." Like a smaller guard, he could bring the ball up, and was also able to defend forwards due to his rebounding ability.

== Coaching career ==
In 1954, Johnson became a teacher at El Rancho High School in Pico Rivera, California. As their varsity basketball coach, he led them to the playoffs six times in his 12 seasons. He joined Cypress College when it opened in 1966. Johnson led the Chargers to state championships in 1977 and 1980 along with seven conference titles. Seventeen times they won 20 or more games in a season and reached the state semifinals four times.

Johnson's players included future UCLA and National Basketball Association (NBA) centers Mark Eaton and Swen Nater, neither of whom had much basketball experience before joining Cypress. Afterwards, the school gained a reputation for developing big men. Eaton and Nater both set NBA records. The 7-foot-4-inch (2.24 m) Eaton holds the NBA single-season records for total blocks (456) and blocks per game (5.6) as well as the career record for blocks per game (3.5). The 6-foot-11-inch (2.11 m) Nater is the only player to lead both the American Basketball Association and NBA in rebounding, and he also holds the NBA record for defensive rebounds in a half (18).

Johnson was never attracted to head coaching opportunities at four-year colleges, preferring the purer coaching environment of junior colleges. He retired in 1994 after 27 seasons with Cypress, compiling a 588–259 record, at the time the most wins by a California junior college men's basketball coach. In 1996, he joined Biola University as an assistant coach under Dave Holmquist, who played for Johnson at Cypress from 1969 to 1971. Johnson remained at Biola until his death in 2019.

== Legacy ==
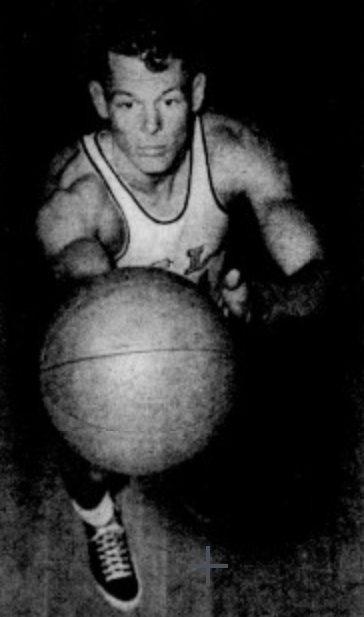
Johnson with UCLA in 1950

Johnson was inducted into the Orange County Hall of Fame in 1996, the Fullerton College Athletic Hall of Fame in 2010, and the UCLA Athletics Hall of Fame in 2013. Cypress honored him in 2009 by renaming its basketball court "Don Johnson Court".

== Personal life ==
Johnson's father, Jack, was a basketball coach at El Monte High. Johnson's mother, Cecile Sparks, played basketball at the University of Kansas for James Naismith, the game's inventor.

Johnson met his wife, Colette (née Hill), when he was attending Fullerton. They married before his second season at UCLA. They had three children. She worked at the ASUCLA News Bureau while he was playing for the Bruins. She was later an administrative assistant at Cypress, helping open the school in 1966.

Johnson died on February 6, 2019, at the age of 88.
