= Eddie Sheldrake =

American basketball player and restaurateur (1926–2025)

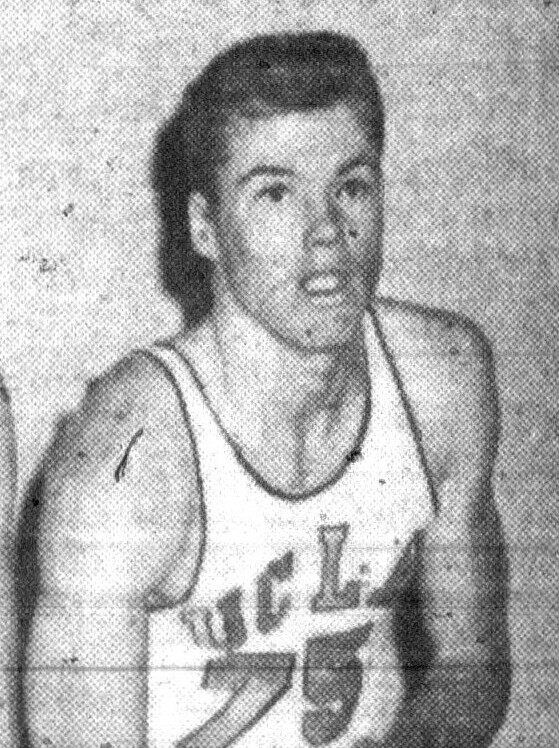
- Sheldrake c. 1951

Personal information
- Born: October 25, 1926
- Died: May 8, 2025 (aged 98)
- Listed height: 5 ft 9 in (1.75 m)

Career information
- High school: Washington (Los Angeles, California)
- College: UCLA (1948–1951)
- NBA draft: 1951: undrafted
- Position: Guard

Career history
- 1951–1957: Los Angeles Kirby's Shoes

Career highlights
- Honorable mention All-American – AP, UPI (1951); First-team PCC All-Southern Division (1951); Second-team PCC All-Southern Division (1950)

Harvey Edward Sheldrake Jr. (October 25, 1926 – May 8, 2025) was an American basketball player and restaurateur. He played college basketball for the UCLA Bruins. Standing 5 feet 9 inches (1.75 m), Sheldrake earned honorable mention as an All-American as a senior in 1951. After graduating from college, he played in the Amateur Athletic Union (AAU). He later opened restaurants with his brother, including KFC locations and over a dozen branches of Polly's Pies.

== Early life ==
Sheldrake was born on October 25, 1926. He grew up in southwest Los Angeles and attended George Washington High School. He played on their "B" basketball team until his senior year, as he only weighed a modest 110 pounds (50 kg). He became an aviation mechanic in the Navy before enrolling at the University of California, Los Angeles, in 1947.

== Basketball career ==
At UCLA, Sheldrake was the captain of the Bruins' freshman team, breaking their season scoring record with 262 points; Dick Ridgway surpassed him with 284 in 1950. Sheldrake was a reserve for most of his second year in 1948–49, playing in 24 games and averaging 3.0 points per contest in John Wooden's first season as UCLA's head coach. The Long Beach Press-Telegram wrote that "perhaps it's a good break for" the 5-foot-9-inch (1.75 m) Sheldrake to play for Wooden, who was a 5-foot-10-inch (1.78 m), three-time All-American playing for Purdue. The Bruins needed wins in their final two games, both against their crosstown rivals, USC, to win the Southern Division of the Pacific Coast Conference (PCC). However, they lost starters Chuck Clustka and Ron Pearson to viral infections, and Alan Sawyer underwent an emergency appendectomy. Sheldrake scored a game-high 17 points in the first game, and had 10 points in the second, as UCLA won both meetings for the title. Joining the Bruins that season was his best friend from high school, Jerry Norman, who received multiple NCAA Division I offers and was persuaded by Sheldrake to choose UCLA.

Sheldrake became a regular at guard in 1949–50, when UCLA won the PCC championship over Washington State. The Bruins were selected for the 1950 NCAA tournament, the first NCAA tournament appearance of Wooden's coaching career, but lost their opener to Bradley, who was ranked No. 1 by the Associated Press (AP). Sheldrake was voted a second-team All-PCC Southern Division selection, and United Press (UP) named him a first-team Little All-American, its team of top players standing 5 feet 10 inches and under.

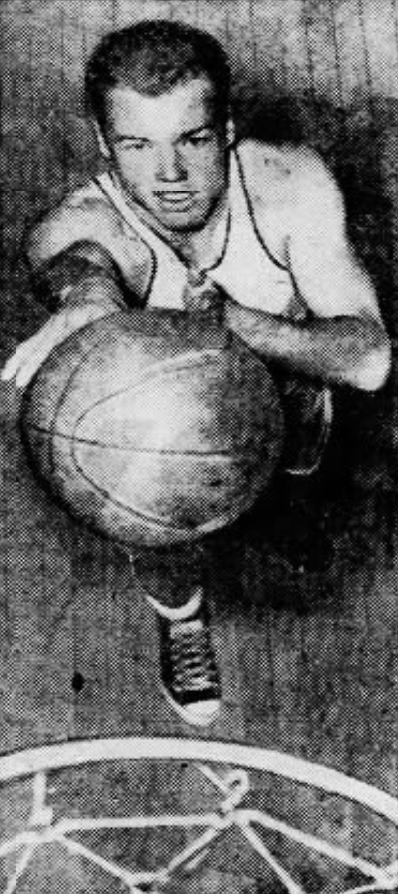
Sheldrake broke the UCLA single-game scoring record with 38 points.

Sheldrake was voted the Bruins' captain for 1950–51, when they lost nine lettermen, and he was the only regular to return. He was converted to forward that season before moving back to guard after the 6-foot-4-inch (1.93 m) sophomore Ridgway established himself with some 20-point games. In January 1951, Wooden kicked Norman off the team for two weeks for talking to a teammate during practice and not paying attention. Sheldrake, who was also friendly with the coach, facilitated their reconciliation. On February 17, Sheldrake scored 38 points, making 15 of 23 field goal attempts and 8 of 11 on free throws, in a 90–67 win over Stanford, breaking the Southern Division record of 36 set by Ralph Vaughn against UCLA in 1939. The previous UCLA record was 30, (Note: Willie Naulls broke Sheldrake's UCLA record with 39 points in 1956 against California.) held by Don Barksdale and Bill O'Brien. The Bruins also surpassed the Southern Division team record of 88 points, set in 1947 by California. Wooden had told Sheldrake to score more as Ridgway, their leading scorer, was ill. The coach said that Sheldrake was "taking his captaincy pretty seriously" and had been passing up shots to give others the opportunity to score. After winning their third consecutive Southern Division title, UCLA lost two straight games to Washington, who won the conference championship. Sheldrake missed the first game with the flu before playing most of the second.

Sheldrake received honorable mention from AP and UP for their 1951 All-America team. He was a first-team All-Southern Division selection and was again named to the Little All-American first team. He won the Caddy Works award as UCLA's most inspirational player and received the Glendale Bruin club award as the team's outstanding senior. He was inducted into the UCLA Athletics Hall of Fame in 2000.

After college, Sheldrake played AAU basketball for Los Angeles Kirby's Shoes. He was team captain in 1951–52, leading them to a 12–0 record in Far West AAU. The Hollywood Citizen-News named him to the All-Far West AAU first team. Kirby's played in the National Industrial Basketball League (NIBL) for one season in 1952–53, when Sheldrake was named an NIBL All-Star. By 1958, he was no longer playing with the club, with The Daily Report writing that "age had taken its toll".

== Later years ==
After graduating from UCLA, Sheldrake became a furniture salesman and president of a furniture manufacturing company. He opened Kentucky Fried Chicken shops with his brother Don, starting in Belmont Shore, California, in 1965. By 1971, they owned 10 in Los Angeles County and Orange County. Wanting to expand from KFC to an original restaurant, the brothers began their Polly's Pies chain in Fullerton in 1968. It was a former Pie Pantry location, with two P's serving as the front door handles. Not wanting to spend money to change the doors, they named the restaurant in honor of their manager's newborn daughter, Polly. The restaurant expanded to over a dozen locations in Los Angeles and Orange counties. Best known for their pies, they also serve other comfort food.

== Personal life ==
Sheldrake had eight children. As a college freshman in 1948, he married his first wife, Lois (née Crum), who was a student at Pepperdine University. She died of cancer in 1959. They had two sons and two daughters.

Sheldrake died on May 8, 2025, at the age of 98.
