= 1950–51 NCAA men's basketball season =

Men's collegiate basketball season

- Preseason AP No. 1: None
- NCAA Tournament: 1951
- Tournament dates: March 20 – 27, 1951
- National Championship: Williams Arena; Minneapolis, Minnesota
- NCAA Champions: Kentucky Wildcats
- Helms National Champions: Kentucky Wildcats
- Other champions: BYU Cougars (NIT)
- Player of the Year (Helms): Dick Groat, Duke Blue Devils

The 1950–51 NCAA men's basketball season began in December 1950, progressed through the regular season and conference tournaments, and concluded with the 1951 NCAA basketball tournament championship game on March 27, 1951, at Williams Arena in Minneapolis, Minnesota. The Kentucky Wildcats won their third NCAA national championship with a 68–58 victory over the Kansas State Wildcats.

== Season headlines ==
- The United Press (later United Press International) Coaches Poll made its debut.
- After a two-season hiatus during which its teams competed as non-major programs, the Border Conference resumed basketball competition as a major conference.
- During January and February 1951, the CCNY point-shaving scandal was revealed. Over the next few months, it results in the arrests of 32 players from seven schools for point shaving in 86 games between 1947 and 1950.
- The NCAA tournament expanded for the first time, from eight to 16 teams.
- Conference champions qualified automatically for the NCAA tournament for the first time.
- Columbia (21–0) became the first undefeated team to play in an NCAA tournament. The Lions lost to Illinois 79-71 in the first round.

== Season outlook ==
=== Pre-season polls ===
The Top 20 from the UP Coaches Poll during the pre-season.

UP Coaches
Ranking	Team
1	CCNY
2	Bradley
3	Kentucky
4	NC State
5	Kansas
6	Oklahoma A&M
7	Long Island
8	Iowa
9	St. John's
10	Indiana
11	UCLA
12	Kansas State
13 (tie)	Arkansas
13 (tie)	Syracuse
13 (tie)	Western Kentucky State
16	Washington
17 (tie)	DePaul
17 (tie)	Illinois
19	Ohio State
20	BYU

== Conference membership changes ==
School	Former conference	New conference
Butler Bulldogs	Mid-American Conference	Independent
Houston Cougars	Non-major basketball program	Missouri Valley Conference
Michigan State Spartans	Independent	Big Ten Conference
Wayne Warriors	Independent	No NCAA basketball program
West Virginia Mountaineers	Independent	Southern Conference

== Regular season ==
=== Conferences ===
==== Conference winners and tournaments ====
Conference	Regular season winner	Conference player of the year	Conference tournament	Tournament venue (City)	Tournament winner
Big Seven Conference	Kansas State	None selected	No Tournament		
Big Ten Conference	Illinois	None selected	No Tournament		
Border Conference	Arizona		No Tournament		
Eastern Intercollegiate Basketball League	Columbia	None selected	No Tournament		
Metropolitan New York Conference	St. John's		No Tournament		
Mid-American Conference	Cincinnati	None selected	No Tournament		
Missouri Valley Conference	Oklahoma A&M	None selected	No Tournament		
Ohio Valley Conference	Murray State	None selected	1951 Ohio Valley Conference men's basketball tournament	Jefferson County Armory (Louisville, Kentucky)	Murray State
Pacific Coast Conference	Washington (North); UCLA (South)		No Tournament; Washington defeated UCLA in best-of-three conference championship playoff series		
Skyline Conference	BYU		No Tournament		
Southeastern Conference	Kentucky	None selected	1951 SEC men's basketball tournament	Jefferson County Armory, (Louisville, Kentucky)	Vanderbilt
Southern Conference	NC State	None selected	1951 Southern Conference men's basketball tournament	Reynolds Coliseum (Raleigh, North Carolina)	NC State
Southwest Conference	Texas, Texas A&M, & TCU	None selected	No Tournament		
Western New York Little Three Conference	St. Bonaventure		No Tournament		
Yankee Conference	Connecticut	None selected	No Tournament		

==== Conference standings ====
1950–51 Big Seven Conference men's basketball standings
	Conf.				Overall
Team	W		L	PCT	W		L	PCT
No. 4 Kansas State	11	–	1	.917	25	–	4	.862
Kansas	8	–	4	.667	16	–	8	.667
Missouri	8	–	4	.667	16	–	8	.667
Oklahoma	6	–	6	.500	14	–	10	.583
Nebraska	4	–	8	.333	9	–	14	.391
Iowa State	3	–	9	.250	9	–	12	.429
Colorado	2	–	10	.167	4	–	20	.167
Rankings from AP Poll

1950–51 Big Ten Conference men's basketball standings
	Conf.				Overall
Team	W		L	PCT	W		L	PCT
No. 5 Illinois	13	–	1	.929	22	–	5	.815
No. 7 Indiana	12	–	2	.857	19	–	3	.864
Iowa	9	–	5	.643	15	–	7	.682
Minnesota	7	–	7	.500	13	–	9	.591
Northwestern	7	–	7	.500	12	–	10	.545
Wisconsin	7	–	7	.500	10	–	12	.455
Michigan State	5	–	9	.357	10	–	11	.476
Purdue	4	–	10	.286	8	–	14	.364
Michigan	3	–	11	.214	7	–	15	.318
Ohio State	3	–	11	.214	6	–	16	.273
Rankings from AP Poll

1950–51 Border Conference men's basketball standings
	Conf.				Overall
Team	W		L	PCT	W		L	PCT
No. 12 Arizona	15	–	1	.938	24	–	6	.800
New Mexico A&M	10	–	6	.625	19	–	14	.576
Texas Tech	10	–	6	.625	14	–	14	.500
New Mexico	9	–	7	.563	13	–	11	.542
West Texas State	9	–	7	.563	14	–	12	.538
Hardin–Simmons	6	–	10	.375	13	–	15	.464
Arizona State–Tempe	6	–	10	.375	9	–	16	.360
Texas Western	4	–	12	.250	10	–	15	.400
Arizona State–Flagstaff	3	–	13	.188	8	–	19	.296
Rankings from AP Poll

1950–51 Eastern Intercollegiate Basketball League standings
	Conf.				Overall
Team	W		L	PCT	W		L	PCT
No. 3 Columbia	12	–	0	1.000	21	–	1	.955
Cornell	10	–	2	.833	20	–	5	.800
Penn	7	–	5	.583	19	–	8	.704
Princeton	5	–	7	.417	15	–	7	.682
Yale	4	–	8	.333	14	–	13	.519
Harvard	3	–	9	.250	8	–	18	.308
Dartmouth	1	–	11	.083	3	–	23	.115
Rankings from AP Poll

1950–51 Metropolitan New York Conference men's basketball standings
	Conf.				Overall
Team	W		L	PCT	W		L	PCT
No. 9 St. John's (NY)	6	–	0	1.000	26	–	5	.839
Fordham	3	–	3	.500	19	–	8	.704
NYU	3	–	2	.600	12	–	4	.750
Manhattan	3	–	2	.600	16	–	6	.727
CCNY	2	–	2	.500	12	–	7	.632
St. Francis (NY)	1	–	5	.167	19	–	11	.633
Brooklyn	0	–	5	.000	9	–	7	.563
Rankings from AP Poll

1950–51 Mid-American Conference men's basketball standings
	Conf.				Overall
Team	W		L	PCT	W		L	PCT
No. 17 Cincinnati	7	–	1	.875	18	–	4	.818
Western Michigan	4	–	4	.500	13	–	9	.591
Ohio	4	–	4	.500	13	–	11	.542
Miami (Ohio)	4	–	4	.500	10	–	13	.435
Western Reserve	1	–	7	.125	3	–	7	.300
Rankings from AP Poll

1950–51 Missouri Valley Conference men's basketball standings
	Conf.				Overall
Team	W		L	PCT	W		L	PCT
No. 2 Oklahoma A&M	12	–	2	.857	29	–	6	.829
No. 6 Bradley	11	–	3	.786	32	–	6	.842
No. 10 Saint Louis	11	–	3	.786	22	–	8	.733
Detroit	7	–	7	.500	17	–	14	.548
Wichita Municipal	5	–	9	.357	9	–	16	.360
Drake	4	–	10	.286	11	–	14	.440
Tulsa	4	–	10	.286	10	–	17	.370
Houston	2	–	12	.143	11	–	17	.393
Rankings from AP Poll

1950–51 Mountain States Conference men's basketball standings
	Conf.				Overall
Team	W		L	PCT	W		L	PCT
No. 11 BYU	15	–	5	.750	28	–	9	.757
Wyoming	13	–	7	.650	26	–	11	.703
Utah	12	–	8	.600	23	–	13	.639
Denver	8	–	12	.400	14	–	16	.467
Colorado A&M	6	–	14	.300	13	–	20	.394
Utah State	6	–	14	.300	12	–	22	.353
Rankings from AP Poll

1950–51 Ohio Valley Conference men's basketball standings
	Conf.				Overall
Team	W		L	PCT	W		L	PCT
No. 16 Murray State†		–		–	21	–	6	.778
Eastern Kentucky State		–		–	18	–	8	.692
Evansville		–		–	23	–	7	.767
Western Kentucky State		–		–	19	–	10	.655
Morehead State		–		–	14	–	12	.538
Marshall		–		–	13	–	13	.500
Tennessee Tech		–		–	12	–	9	.571
† Ohio Valley Conference Tournament winner Rankings from AP Poll

1950–51 Pacific Coast Conference men's basketball standings
	Conf.				Overall
Team	W		L	PCT	W		L	PCT
North
No. 15 Washington †	11	–	5	.688	24	–	6	.800
Oregon	10	–	6	.625	18	–	13	.581
Washington State	7	–	9	.438	17	–	15	.531
Idaho	6	–	10	.375	15	–	14	.517
Oregon State	6	–	10	.375	14	–	18	.438
South
UCLA	8	–	4	.667	19	–	10	.655
No. 19 USC	8	–	4	.667	21	–	6	.778
Stanford	5	–	7	.417	12	–	14	.462
California	3	–	9	.250	16	–	16	.500
† Conference playoff series winner Rankings from AP Poll

1950–51 Rocky Mountain Conference men's basketball standings
	Conf.				Overall
Team	W		L	PCT	W		L	PCT
Montana State	9	–	1	.900	24	–	12	.667
Colorado College	8	–	2	.800	13	–	9	.591
Colorado State–Greeley	6	–	4	.600	11	–	11	.500
Idaho State	5	–	5	.500	17	–	12	.586
Colorado Mines	2	–	8	.200	3	–	11	.214
Western State (CO)	0	–	10	.000	3	–	19	.136

1950–51 Southeastern Conference men's basketball standings
	Conf.				Overall
Team	W		L	PCT	W		L	PCT
No. 1 Kentucky	14	–	0	1.000	32	–	2	.941
Vanderbilt †	10	–	4	.714	19	–	8	.704
Alabama	10	–	4	.714	15	–	8	.652
Tulane	8	–	6	.571	12	–	12	.500
Auburn	6	–	8	.429	12	–	10	.545
Georgia	6	–	8	.429	13	–	11	.542
Florida	6	–	8	.429	11	–	12	.478
LSU	6	–	8	.429	10	–	14	.417
Georgia Tech	6	–	8	.429	8	–	19	.296
Ole Miss	5	–	9	.357	12	–	12	.500
Tennessee	5	–	9	.357	10	–	13	.435
Mississippi State	2	–	12	.143	3	–	16	.158
† 1951 SEC Tournament winner Rankings from AP Poll

1950–51 Southern Conference men's basketball standings
	Conf.				Overall
Team	W		L	PCT	W		L	PCT
No. 8 North Carolina State †	13	–	1	.929	30	–	7	.811
West Virginia	9	–	3	.750	18	–	9	.667
Clemson	9	–	4	.692	11	–	7	.611
William & Mary	13	–	6	.684	20	–	11	.645
Duke	13	–	6	.684	20	–	13	.606
Virginia Tech	9	–	5	.643	19	–	10	.655
South Carolina	12	–	7	.632	13	–	12	.520
Maryland	11	–	8	.579	15	–	10	.600
North Carolina	9	–	8	.529	12	–	15	.444
Wake Forest	8	–	9	.471	16	–	14	.533
George Washington	8	–	9	.471	12	–	12	.500
Richmond	5	–	10	.333	7	–	14	.333
Washington and Lee	5	–	13	.278	8	–	17	.320
VMI	3	–	11	.214	3	–	18	.143
Davidson	5	–	15	.250	7	–	19	.269
The Citadel	2	–	7	.222	6	–	11	.353
Furman	1	–	13	.071	3	–	20	.130
† Southern Conference Tournament winner Rankings from AP Poll

1950–51 Southwest Conference men's basketball standings
	Conf.				Overall
Team	W		L	PCT	W		L	PCT
TCU	8	–	4	.667	16	–	9	.640
Texas A&M	8	–	4	.667	17	–	12	.586
Texas	8	–	4	.667	13	–	14	.481
Arkansas	7	–	5	.583	13	–	11	.542
SMU	6	–	6	.500	14	–	10	.583
Baylor	3	–	9	.250	8	–	16	.333
Rice	2	–	10	.167	8	–	15	.348
Rankings from AP Poll

1950–51 Western New York Little Three Conference men's basketball standings
	Conf.				Overall
Team	W		L	PCT	W		L	PCT
St. Bonaventure	3	–	1	.750	19	–	6	.760
Niagara	2	–	2	.500	18	–	10	.643
Canisius	1	–	3	.250	15	–	10	.600
Rankings from AP Poll

1950–51 Yankee Conference men's basketball standings
	Conf.				Overall
Team	W		L	PCT	W		L	PCT
Connecticut	6	–	1	.857	22	–	4	.846
Vermont	4	–	1	.800	14	–	6	.700
Rhode Island State	5	–	2	.714	13	–	15	.464
Maine	2	–	5	.286	5	–	13	.278
Massachusetts	1	–	3	.250	6	–	15	.286
New Hampshire	0	–	6	.000	4	–	12	.250

=== Major independents ===
A total of 44 college teams played as major independents. Among them, Dayton (27–5) finished with both the best winning percentage (.844) and the most wins.

1950–51 NCAA men's basketball independents standings
	Conf.				Overall
Team	W		L	PCT	W		L	PCT
No. 13 Dayton		–		–	27	–	5	.844
LIU		–		–	20	–	4	.833
Holy Cross		–		–	20	–	5	.800
No. 20 Villanova		–		–	25	–	7	.781
Seton Hall		–		–	24	–	7	.774
La Salle		–		–	22	–	7	.759
No. 14 Toledo		–		–	22	–	7	.759
Baldwin Wallace		–		–	19	–	7	.731
Louisville		–		–	19	–	7	.731
Navy		–		–	16	–	6	.727
No. 18 Siena		–		–	19	–	8	.704
Syracuse		–		–	19	–	9	.679
Xavier		–		–	16	–	10	.615
Penn State		–		–	14	–	9	.609
Boston College		–		–	17	–	11	.607
Duquesne		–		–	16	–	11	.593
Lafayette		–		–	14	–	11	.560
Loyola (Calif.)		–		–	14	–	11	.560
Bowling Green State		–		–	15	–	12	.556
Colgate		–		–	12	–	10	.545
Valparaiso		–		–	12	–	10	.545
Notre Dame		–		–	13	–	11	.542
Oklahoma City		–		–	16	–	14	.533
Army		–		–	9	–	8	.529
DePaul		–		–	13	–	12	.520
Loyola (Ill.)		–		–	15	–	14	.517
St. Joseph's		–		–	13	–	14	.481
Temple		–		–	12	–	13	.480
Miami (Fla.)		–		–	10	–	12	.455
Saint Mary's		–		–	9	–	11	.450
Muhlenberg		–		–	11	–	14	.440
Brown		–		–	8	–	11	.421
Bucknell		–		–	9	–	13	.409
Santa Clara		–		–	9	–	15	.375
Georgetown		–		–	8	–	14	.364
Marquette		–		–	8	–	14	.364
Virginia		–		–	8	–	14	.364
Pittsburgh		–		–	9	–	17	.346
San Francisco		–		–	9	–	17	.346
Creighton		–		–	9	–	18	.333
Rutgers		–		–	7	–	14	.333
Lehigh		–		–	6	–	13	.316
Butler		–		–	5	–	19	.208
John Carroll		–		–	2	–	21	.087
Rankings from AP Poll

=== Informal championships ===
Conference	Regular season winner	Conference player of the year	Conference tournament	Tournament venue (City)	Tournament winner
Middle Three Conference	Rutgers	None selected	No Tournament		

NOTE: Despite its name, the Middle Three Conference was an informal scheduling alliance rather than a true conference, and its members played as independents. In 1950–51, Rutgers finished with the best record in games played between the three members.

== Post-season tournaments ==
=== NCAA tournament ===
==== Semifinals & finals ====
National Semifinals
Illinois	74
Kentucky	76
Kansas State	68
Oklahoma A&M	44

National Finals
Kentucky	68
Kansas State	58
Third place
Illinois	61
Oklahoma A&M	46

=== National Invitation tournament ===
==== Semifinals & finals ====
Semifinals
BYU	69
Seton Hall	59
St. John's	62
Dayton	69

Finals
BYU	62
Dayton	43
Third place
Seton Hall	68
St. John's	70

== Awards ==
=== Consensus All-American teams ===
Consensus First Team
Player	Position	Class	Team
Clyde Lovellette	C	Junior	Kansas
Gene Melchiorre	G	Senior	Bradley
Bill Mlkvy	F	Junior	Temple
Sam Ranzino	G	Senior	North Carolina State
Bill Spivey	C	Junior	Kentucky

Consensus Second Team
Player	Position	Class	Team
Ernie Barrett	G/F	Senior	Kansas State
Bill Garrett	F	Senior	Indiana
Dick Groat	G	Junior	Duke
Mel Hutchins	F/C	Senior	BYU
Gale McArthur	G	Senior	Oklahoma A&M

=== Major player of the year awards ===
- Helms Player of the Year: Dick Groat, Duke
- Sporting News Player of the Year: Sherman White, Long Island

=== Other major awards ===
- NIT/Haggerty Award (Top player in New York City metro area): John Azary, Columbia

== Coaching changes ==
A number of teams changed coaches during the season and after it ended.

Team	Former Coach	Interim Coach	New Coach	Reason
Army	John Mauer		Elmer Ripley	Mauer left to coach at Florida.
Florida	Sam J. McAllister		John Mauer	
Georgia	Jim Whatley		Harbin Lawson	
Georgia Tech	Roy McArthur		John Hyder	
Iowa	Rollie Williams		Bucky O'Connor	
John Carroll	Elmer Ripley		Fred George	Ripley left to coach at Army.
Lafayette	Ray Stanley	Bill Anderson	Butch van Breda Kolff	
Loyola (Ill.)	John Jordan		George Ireland	Jordan left to coach Notre Dame.
Marquette	Bill Chandler		Tex Winter	
Miami (Ohio)	John Brickels		Bill Rohr	
New Hampshire	Andy Mooradian		Dale Hall	
New Mexico	Woody Clements		Ben Huffman	
Notre Dame	Moose Krause		John Jordan	
Oregon	John A. Warren		Bill Borcher	
Stanford	Everett Dean		Bob Burnett	
Texas	Jack Gray		Slue Hull	
Valparaiso	Wilbur Allen		Ken Suesens	
Virginia	Gus Tebell		Evan Male	
Wichita Municipal	Ken Gunning		Ralph Miller	
William & Mary	Barney Wilson		H. Lester Hooker	
Xavier	Lew Hirt		Ned Wulk	
