= Jack Friel =

American basketball player and coach (1898-1995)

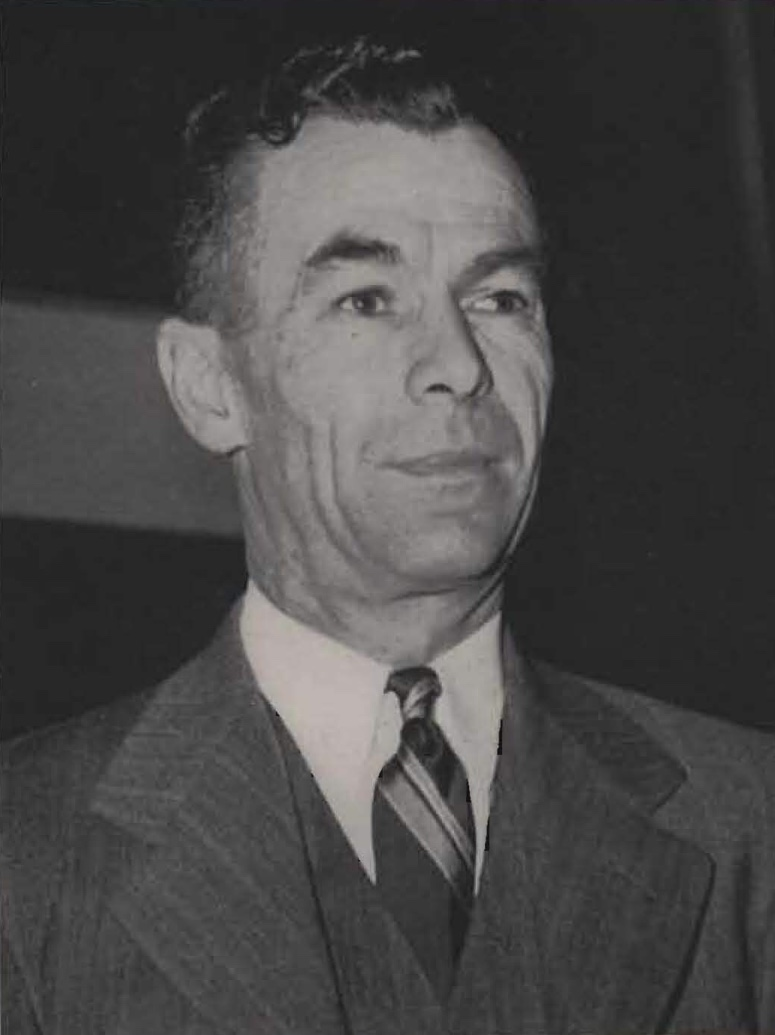
- Friel in the 1950 "Chinook"

Biographical details
- Born: August 26, 1898; Waterville, Washington, U.S.
- Died: December 12, 1995 (aged 97); Pullman, Washington, U.S.

Playing career
- 1920–1923: Washington State
- Position: Forward

Coaching career (HC unless noted)
- 1923–1925: Colville HS (WA)
- 1925–1928: North Central HS (WA)
- 1928–1958: Washington State

Administrative career (AD unless noted)
- 1963–1971: Big Sky (commissioner)

Head coaching record
- Overall: 495–377 (college)

Accomplishments and honors

Championships
- PCC (1941)
- Military career
- Allegiance: United States
- Branch: U.S. Army
- Conflicts: World War I

John Bryan Friel (August 26, 1898 – December 12, 1995) was an American college basketball coach, the head coach of the Washington State Cougars for 30 seasons, from 1928 to 1958. He holds the school record for victories by a men's basketball coach with 495, and led Washington State to the NCAA tournament championship game in 1941. He was later the first commissioner of the Big Sky Conference.

Friel played college basketball at Washington State before becoming a high school coach. In 1928, he was named the head coach of Washington State. His teams won one Pacific Coast Conference championship and three divisional titles. Friel officiated college football games and was head coach of the Cougars baseball team from 1943 to 1945.

== Early years ==
Born in Waterville, Washington, Friel enrolled at Washington State College in 1916, then served in Europe during World War I. He returned to Pullman after the war and was the captain of the basketball team, playing at forward and earning all-conference honors in 1922. He claimed six varsity letters, and in 18 starts as a baseball pitcher had a win–loss record of 15–1.

== High school coach ==
Following graduation in 1923, Friel coached high school basketball, first at Colville, then at North Central in Spokane, winning the state title in his third and final season at North Central.

== Washington State ==
He became the head basketball coach at his alma mater in 1928, and his team posted a 9–14 record in his first season. Washington State increased its victory total each of the next three seasons, winning 22 games in 1931–32. The Cougars won at least 20 games in 10 of Friel's 30 seasons as head coach, and had 21 winning seasons. The 1940–41 team was Friel's only one to make the NCAA Tournament. One of three Washington State teams to win a Pacific Coast Conference divisional championship under Friel, the 1940–41 Cougars won the conference title, and won two games in the NCAA Tournament to advance to the final, where they lost 39–34 to Wisconsin. Friel has been credited as helping to change free throw rules in college basketball. In addition to his duties as basketball coach, Friel was Washington State's baseball head coach from 1943 to 1945 and a college football official; he was originally selected to officiate the 1942 Rose Bowl, but his basketball schedule prevented him from serving as referee.

After the early 1950s, his Cougar teams struggled, failing to post a winning record following a 19–16 mark in 1951–52; in November 1957, Friel announced that he would retire at the end of the season. Friel had the eighth-most wins among Division I men's college basketball coaches when he retired. He remained with the school into the 1960s, continuing as golf coach and in the physical education program.

The court inside Beasley Coliseum, the Cougars' home arena, was named after Friel in April 1977, as announced by university President Glenn Terrell at a meeting of the board of regents; the dedication ceremony was at halftime on December 3. The following year, Friel was among the first to be inducted into Washington State's Athletic Hall of Fame.

== Conference work ==
Friel was a supervisor for the Pacific-10 Conference's basketball officiating bureau and spent eight years as the first commissioner of the Big Sky Conference, beginning in 1963. Into the 1980s, Friel continued working for the Pac-10, evaluating officials.

== Death ==
Friel died at the age of 97 in Pullman on December 12, 1995, due to pneumonia. In 2003, he was inducted into the Pac-10 Basketball Hall of Honor. That summer, his widow Catherine died at age 101.

== Head coaching record ==
=== College ===
Record table
Season	Team	Overall	Conference	Standing	Postseason
Washington State Cougars (Pacific Coast Conference) (1928–1958)
1928–29	Washington State	9–14	5–5	3rd North	
1929–30	Washington State	14–12	9–7	2nd North	
1930–31	Washington State	18–7	10–6	2nd North	
1931–32	Washington State	22–5	11–5	2nd North	
1932–33	Washington State	17–8	8–8	3rd North	
1933–34	Washington State	14–11	6–10	4th North	
1934–35	Washington State	12–12	6–10	4th North	
1935–36	Washington State	22–8	8–8	3rd North	
1936–37	Washington State	24–8	11–5	1st North	
1937–38	Washington State	19–11	12–8	T-3rd North	
1938–39	Washington State	23–10	8–8	3rd North	
1939–40	Washington State	23–10	9–7	3rd North	
1940–41	Washington State	26–6	13–3	1st	NCAA Runner-up
1941–42	Washington State	21–8	9–7	3rd North	
1942–43	Washington State	19–11	9–7	3rd North	
1943–44	Washington State	8–19	4–12	5th North	
1944–45	Washington State	23–13	11–5	T-1st North	
1945–46	Washington State	16–13	5–11	5th North	
1946–47	Washington State	23–10	11–5	2nd North	
1947–48	Washington State	19–10	9–7	3rd North	
1948–49	Washington State	21–9	8–8	2nd North	
1949–50	Washington State	19–13	11–5	1st North	
1950–51	Washington State	17–15	7–9	3rd North	
1951–52	Washington State	19–16	6–10	4th North	
1952–53	Washington State	7–27	3–13	5th North	
1953–54	Washington State	10–17	4–12	5th North	
1954–55	Washington State	11–15	5–11	T-4th North	
1955–56	Washington State	4–22	2–14	9th	
1956–57	Washington State	8–18	4–12	T-7th	
1957–58	Washington State	7–19	3–13	9th	
Washington State:		495–377 (.568)	227–251 (.475)		
Total:		495–377 (.568)			
National champion Postseason invitational champion Conference regular season champion Conference regular season and conference tournament champion Division regular season champion Division regular season and conference tournament champion Conference tournament champion

== See also ==
- List of NCAA Division I Men's Final Four appearances by coach
