= Charles Finley (coach) =

American basketball and baseball coach

Charles L. Finley
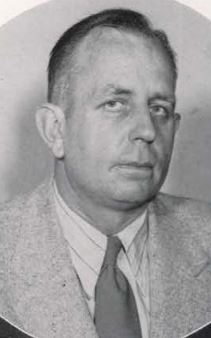

Biographical details
- Born: October 18, 1907
- Died: May 1, 1972 (aged 64); Socorro, New Mexico, U.S.

Playing career

Basketball
- 1930–1932: Northwest Missouri State

Coaching career (HC unless noted)

Basketball
- 1944–1945: Texas Mines
- 1945–1947: New Mexico Mines
- 1947–1954: Idaho
- 1954–1957: Mississippi Southern

Baseball
- 1948–1953: Idaho

Administrative career (AD unless noted)
- 1945–1947: New Mexico Mines
- Military career
- Allegiance: United States
- Branch: United States Navy
- Service years: 1942–1944
- Rank: Lieutenant
- Conflicts: World War II

Charles L. Finley (October 18, 1907 – May 1, 1972) was an American basketball and baseball head coach, primarily at the University of Idaho in Moscow.

Hired by Idaho in the summer of 1947, Finley led Vandal basketball for seven seasons, then a member of the Pacific Coast Conference. For the first six years, he was concurrently the head coach of the baseball team. He succeeded Guy Wicks, who also coached both sports and moved out of athletics to an administrative position with the university. With the overlap of the two seasons increasing, Clem Parberry was hired as head baseball coach after the 1953 season.

Finley served in the U.S. Navy during World War II, and coached a season at the Texas School of Mines in El Paso (now UTEP) in 1944–45. He was the athletic director and coached two sports at the New Mexico School of Mines in Socorro prior to his stint at Idaho, and was also a baseball scout for the Boston Braves organization.

As a collegian in the early 1930s, he played for legendary coach Henry Iba at Northwest Missouri State in Maryville.

After seven years at Idaho, Finley left in April 1954 for Mississippi Southern, then an independent in NAIA. He was the head coach for three seasons in Hattiesburg.

== Head coaching record ==
Record table
Season	Team	Overall	Conference	Standing	Postseason
Texas Mines Miners (Border Conference) (1944–1945)
1944–45	Texas Mines	10–13	4–7	8th	
Texas Mines:		10–13	4–11		
New Mexico Mines () (1945–1947)
1945–46	New Mexico Mines				
1946–47	New Mexico Mines				
New Mexico Mines:					
Idaho Vandals (Pacific Coast Conference) (1947–1954)
1947–48	Idaho	12–18	3–13	5th (North)	
1948–49	Idaho	13–15	7–9	4th (North)	
1949–50	Idaho	14–16	7–9	4th (North)	
1950–51	Idaho	14–13	6–10	4th (North)	
1951–52	Idaho	19–11	9–7	2nd (North)	
1952–53	Idaho	14–11	8–8	2nd (North)	
1953–54	Idaho	15–8	9–7	2nd (North)	
Idaho:		101–92	49–63		
Mississippi Southern Southerners (NAIA independent) (1954–1957)
1954–55	Mississippi Southern	11–17			
1955–56	Mississippi Southern	16–12			
1956–57	Mississippi Southern	12–13			
Mississippi Southern:		39–42			
Total:		150–147			
