= Men's Gym =

Men's Gym may refer to:

- Haas Pavilion, opened in 1933 as Men's Gym on the campus of University of California, Berkeley
- Student Activities Center (UCLA), opened in 1933 as Men's Gym on the campus of University of California, Los Angeles
