= Jerry Norman =

Jerry Norman may refer to:

- Jerry Norman (sinologist) (1936–2012), American sinologist and linguist
- Jerry Norman (basketball) (born 1929/1930), American basketball coach and player
