= 1949–50 UCLA Bruins men's basketball team =

American college basketball season

1949–50 UCLA Bruins men's basketball

PCC Southern Division Champion

NCAA tournament, L Regional consolation Game
- Conference: Pacific Coast Conference

Ranking
- AP: No. 7
- Record: 24–7 (10–2 PCC)
- Head coach: John R. Wooden (2nd season)
- Assistant coaches: Bill Putnam; Eddie Powell
- Home arena: Men's Gym

1949–50 Pacific Coast Conference men's basketball standings
	Conf.				Overall
Team	W		L	PCT	W		L	PCT
North
No. 18 Washington State	11	–	5	.688	19	–	13	.594
Washington	8	–	8	.500	19	–	10	.655
Oregon State	8	–	8	.500	13	–	14	.481
Idaho	7	–	9	.438	15	–	17	.469
Oregon	6	–	10	.375	9	–	19	.321
South
No. 7 UCLA †	10	–	2	.833	24	–	7	.774
USC	7	–	5	.583	16	–	8	.667
California	4	–	8	.333	10	–	17	.370
Stanford	3	–	9	.250	11	–	14	.440
† Conference playoff series winner As of 1950; Rankings from AP Poll

The 1949–50 UCLA Bruins men's basketball team represented the University of California, Los Angeles during the 1949–50 NCAA men's basketball season and were members of the Pacific Coast Conference. The Bruins were led by second year head coach John Wooden. They finished the regular season with a record of 24–7 and were southern division champions with a record of 10–2. They defeated the Washington State Cougars in the conference play-offs and lost to Bradley in the NCAA regional semifinals and BYU in the regional consolation game.

== Previous season ==
The Bruins finished the season 22–7 overall and won the PCC South Division with a record of 10–2. The Bruins lost to Oregon State in the conference play-offs and were ranked 15 in the final ap poll.

== Roster ==
1949–50 UCLA Bruins men's basketball team
Players
Coaches

Pos.	#	Name	Height	Weight	Year	Hometown
C	35	Ray Alba	—	—
G	72	Art Alper	—	—
		Barry Chasen	—	—
F	38	Ralph Joeckel	—	—
F	76	Ernie Johnson	—	—	Sr	Berkeley, California
C	32	Carl Kraushaar	—	—	Sr
	39	Grover Luchsinger	—	—
		John Matulich	—	—
F	52	Jerry Norman	—	—	Jr
		Wes Robinson	—	—
	58	Paul Saunder	—	—
F	54	Alan Sawyer (C)	6 ft 5 in (1.96 m)	195 lb (88 kg)	Jr	Long Beach, California
G	74	Don Seidel	—	—
G	75	Eddie Sheldrake	—	—
G	73	George Stanich	—	—	Sr	Sacramento, California
		Dick Thompson	—	—
		Dave Williams	—	—
F	32	Gene Williams	—	—

Head coach

John Wooden (Purdue)

Assistant coach(es)

- Eddie Powell (Indiana St)
- Bill Putnam (UCLA)

Legend

- (C) Team captain
- (S) Suspended
- (I) Ineligible
- (W) Walk-on
- Injured
- Current redshirt

Roster
Last update: 31 January 2018

== Schedule ==
Date time, TV	Rank^{#}	Opponent^{#}	Result	Record	Site city, state
Exhibition
		Alumni	W 81–44		Men's Gym; Los Angeles, CA
Regular Season
December 3, 1949*		Arizona State	W 83–55	1–0	Men's Gym; Los Angeles, CA
December 9, 1949*		San Diego State	W 63–36	2–0	Men's Gym; Los Angeles, CA
December 10, 1949*		Pepperdine	W 55–41	3–0	Men's Gym; Los Angeles, CA
December 16, 1949*		vs. Santa Clara	W 68–56	4–0	Cow Palace (2,837); Daly City, CA
December 17, 1949*		at San Francisco	L 40–53	4–1	Kezar Pavilion; San Francisco, CA
December 23, 1949*		at Illinois	W 65–63	5–1	Huff Hall; Champaign, IL
December 26, 1949*		at La Salle	W 62–57	6–1	Wister Hall; Philadelphia, PA
December 27, 1949*		at City College of New York	W 60–53	7–1	Madison Square Garden (18,000); New York, NY
December 29, 1949*		at Northwestern	L 58–64	7–2	Patten Gymnasium; Evanston, IL
December 30, 1949*		at Wisconsin	L 52–54	7–3	Wisconsin Field House; Madison, WI
December 31, 1949*		at Marquette	W 68–52	8–3	Marquette Gymnasium; Marquette, IL
January 6, 1950	No. 9	California	W 50–45	9–3 (1–0)	Men's Gym; Los Angeles, CA
January 7, 1950	No. 9	Stanford	W 71–55	10–3 (2–0)	Men's Gym; Los Angeles, CA
January 13, 1950	No. 10	at USC	L 45–58	10–4 (2–1)	Pan-Pacific Auditorium; Los Angeles, CA
January 14, 1950	No. 10	USC	W 68–47	11–4 (3–1)	Men's Gym (2,600); Los Angeles, CA
January 27, 1950*	No. 11	Santa Barbara College	W 67–43	12–4	Men's Gym; Los Angeles, CA
January 28, 1950*	No. 11	Cal Poly	W 69–38	13–4	Men's Gym; Los Angeles, CA
February 3, 1950*	No. 13	Fresno State	W 93–43	14–4	Men's Gym; Los Angeles, CA
February 4, 1950*	No. 13	Santa Clara	W 74–64	15–4	Men's Gym; Los Angeles, CA
February 10, 1950	No. 12	at Stanford	W 65–55	16–4 (4–1)	Stanford Pavilion; Stanford, CA
February 11, 1950	No. 12	at California	W 54–47	17–4 (5–1)	Men's Gym; Berkeley, CA
February 17, 1950	No. 10	Stanford	W 69–59	18–4 (6–1)	Men's Gym; Los Angeles, CA
February 18, 1950	No. 10	California	W 64–56	19–4 (7–1)	Men's Gym; Los Angeles, CA
February 24, 1950	No. 7	at California	W 46–44	20–4 (8–1)	Men's Gym; Berkeley, CA
February 25, 1950	No. 7	at Stanford	W 62–57	21–4 (9–1)	Stanford Pavilion; Stanford, CA
March 3, 1950	No. 6	USC	L 43–45	21–5 (9–2)	Men's Gym; Los Angeles, CA
March 4, 1950	No. 6	at USC	W 74–57	22–5 (10–2)	Pan-Pacific Auditorium; Los Angeles, CA
Conference Championship
March 10, 1950	No. 7	No. 18 Washington State; PCC Championship play-offs	W 60–58	23–5	Men's Gym; Los Angeles, CA
March 11, 1950	No. 7	No. 18 Washington State; PCC Championship play-offs	W 52–49	24–5	Men's Gym; Los Angeles, CA
NCAA tournament
March 24, 1950*	No. 7	vs. No. 1 Bradley; Regional semifinal	L 59–73	24–6	Municipal Auditorium; Kansas City, MO
March 25, 1950*	No. 7	BYU; Regional consolation Game	L 62–83	24–7	Municipal Auditorium; Kansas City, MO
*Non-conference game. ^{#}Rankings from AP Poll. (#) Tournament seedings in parentheses. All times are in Pacific Time.
