= 1950–51 Idaho Vandals men's basketball team =

American college basketball season

1950–51 Idaho Vandals men's basketball
- Conference: Pacific Coast Conference
- Record: 15–14 (6–10 PCC)
- Head coach: Charles Finley (4th season)
- Home arena: Memorial Gymnasium

1950–51 Pacific Coast Conference men's basketball standings
| | Conf. | | | | Overall |
| Team | W | | L | PCT | W | | L | PCT |
|---|---|---|---|---|---|---|---|---|
North
| No. 15 Washington † | 11 | – | 5 | .688 | 24 | – | 6 | .800 |
| Oregon | 10 | – | 6 | .625 | 18 | – | 13 | .581 |
| Washington State | 7 | – | 9 | .438 | 17 | – | 15 | .531 |
| Idaho | 6 | – | 10 | .375 | 15 | – | 14 | .517 |
| Oregon State | 6 | – | 10 | .375 | 14 | – | 18 | .438 |
South
| UCLA | 8 | – | 4 | .667 | 19 | – | 10 | .655 |
| No. 19 USC | 8 | – | 4 | .667 | 21 | – | 6 | .778 |
| Stanford | 5 | – | 7 | .417 | 12 | – | 14 | .462 |
| California | 3 | – | 9 | .250 | 16 | – | 16 | .500 |
† Conference playoff series winner Rankings from AP Poll

The 1950–51 Idaho Vandals men's basketball team represented the University of Idaho during the 1950–51 NCAA college basketball season. Members of the Pacific Coast Conference, the Vandals were led by fourth-year head coach Charles Finley and played their home games on campus at Memorial Gymnasium in Moscow, Idaho.

The Vandals were 15–14 overall and 6–10 in conference play.
