= 1950–51 Washington State Cougars men's basketball team =

American college basketball season

1950–51 Washington State Cougars men's basketball
- Conference: Pacific Coast Conference
- Record: 17–15 (7–9 PCC)
- Head coach: Jack Friel (23rd season)
- Home arena: Bohler Gymnasium

1950–51 Pacific Coast Conference men's basketball standings
	Conf.				Overall
Team	W		L	PCT	W		L	PCT
North
No. 15 Washington †	11	–	5	.688	24	–	6	.800
Oregon	10	–	6	.625	18	–	13	.581
Washington State	7	–	9	.438	17	–	15	.531
Idaho	6	–	10	.375	15	–	14	.517
Oregon State	6	–	10	.375	14	–	18	.438
South
UCLA	8	–	4	.667	19	–	10	.655
No. 19 USC	8	–	4	.667	21	–	6	.778
Stanford	5	–	7	.417	12	–	14	.462
California	3	–	9	.250	16	–	16	.500
† Conference playoff series winner Rankings from AP Poll

The 1950–51 Washington State Cougars men's basketball team represented Washington State College for the 1950–51 NCAA college basketball season. Led by 23rd-year head coach Jack Friel, the Cougars were members of the Pacific Coast Conference and played their home games on campus at Bohler Gymnasium in Pullman, Washington.

The Cougars were 17–15 overall in the regular season and 7–9 in conference play, third in the Northern division.
