= 1949–50 Idaho Vandals men's basketball team =

American college basketball season

1949–50 Idaho Vandals men's basketball
- Conference: Pacific Coast Conference
- Record: 15–17 (7–9 PCC)
- Head coach: Charles Finley (3rd season)
- Home arena: Memorial Gymnasium

1949–50 Pacific Coast Conference men's basketball standings
	Conf.				Overall
Team	W		L	PCT	W		L	PCT
North
No. 18 Washington State	11	–	5	.688	19	–	13	.594
Washington	8	–	8	.500	19	–	10	.655
Oregon State	8	–	8	.500	13	–	14	.481
Idaho	7	–	9	.438	15	–	17	.469
Oregon	6	–	10	.375	9	–	19	.321
South
No. 7 UCLA †	10	–	2	.833	24	–	7	.774
USC	7	–	5	.583	16	–	8	.667
California	4	–	8	.333	10	–	17	.370
Stanford	3	–	9	.250	11	–	14	.440
† Conference playoff series winner As of 1950; Rankings from AP Poll

The 1949–50 Idaho Vandals men's basketball team represented the University of Idaho during the 1949–50 NCAA college basketball season. Members of the Pacific Coast Conference, the Vandals were led by third-year head coach Charles Finley and played their home games on campus at Memorial Gymnasium in Moscow, Idaho.

The Vandals were 15–17 overall and 7–9 in conference play.
