= 1949–50 Washington Huskies men's basketball team =

American college basketball season

1949–50 Washington Huskies men's basketball
- Conference: Pacific Coast Conference
- Record: 11–15 (6–10 PCC)
- Head coach: Art McLarney (3rd season)
- Home arena: Hec Edmundson Pavilion

1949–50 Pacific Coast Conference men's basketball standings
| | Conf. | | | | Overall |
| Team | W | | L | PCT | W | | L | PCT |
|---|---|---|---|---|---|---|---|---|
North
| No. 18 Washington State | 11 | – | 5 | .688 | 19 | – | 13 | .594 |
| Washington | 8 | – | 8 | .500 | 19 | – | 10 | .655 |
| Oregon State | 8 | – | 8 | .500 | 13 | – | 14 | .481 |
| Idaho | 7 | – | 9 | .438 | 15 | – | 17 | .469 |
| Oregon | 6 | – | 10 | .375 | 9 | – | 19 | .321 |
South
| No. 7 UCLA † | 10 | – | 2 | .833 | 24 | – | 7 | .774 |
| USC | 7 | – | 5 | .583 | 16 | – | 8 | .667 |
| California | 4 | – | 8 | .333 | 10 | – | 17 | .370 |
| Stanford | 3 | – | 9 | .250 | 11 | – | 14 | .440 |
† Conference playoff series winner As of 1950; Rankings from AP Poll

The 1949–50 Washington Huskies men's basketball team represented the University of Washington for the 1949–50 NCAA college basketball season. Led by third-year head coach Art McLarney, the Huskies were members of the Pacific Coast Conference and played their home games on campus at Hec Edmundson Pavilion in Seattle, Washington.

The Huskies were 19–10 overall in the regular season and 8–8 in conference play, tied for second place in the Northern division. Washington swept the final two games of the season (with Oregon State) to pull even with the Beavers and take the season series, three games to one.

McLarney resigned after the season due to ill health, and was succeeded in early June by Tippy Dye, the head coach at Ohio State.
