= Alan Sawyer =

American basketball player

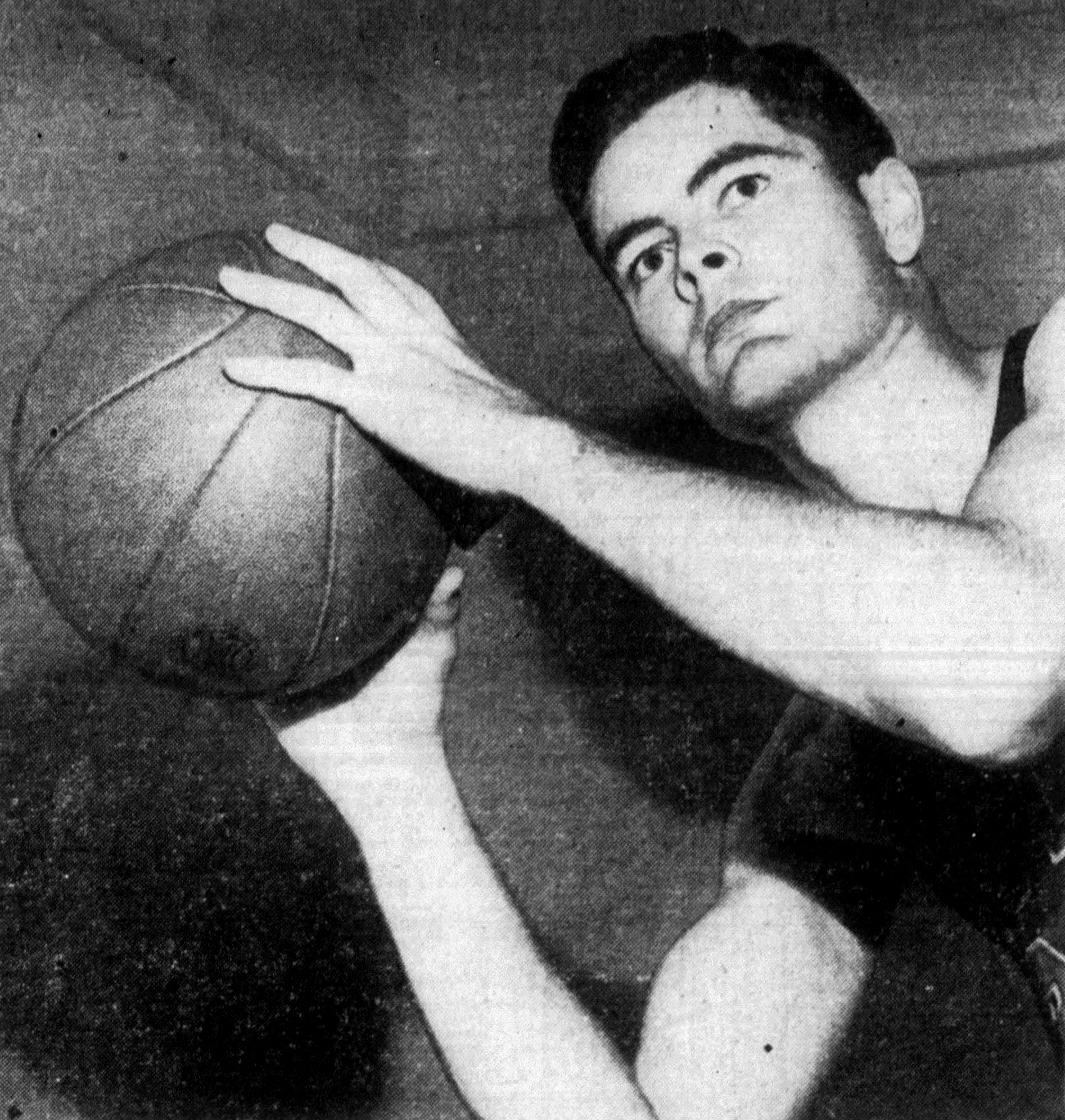
- Sawyer, circa 1948

Personal information
- Born: January 1, 1928 Long Beach, California, U.S.
- Died: June 30, 2012 (aged 84) Sequim, Washington, U.S.
- Listed height: 6 ft 5 in (1.96 m)
- Listed weight: 195 lb (88 kg)

Career information
- High school: San Pedro (San Pedro, California)
- College: UCLA (1945–1946, 1948–1950)
- NBA draft: 1950: 3rd round
- Drafted by: Washington Capitols
- Playing career: 1950–1951
- Position: Forward
- Number: 29, 17

Career history
- 1950–1951: Washington Capitols

Career highlights
- First-team All-PCC (1949)
- Stats at NBA.com
- Stats at Basketball Reference

Alan Leigh Sawyer (January 1, 1928 – June 30, 2012) was an American professional basketball player for the Washington Capitols of the National Basketball Association (NBA). He played college basketball for the UCLA Bruins from 1945 to 1950. He missed the end of the 1948–49 season after an appendectomy. Sawyer helped lead the 1949–50 team to their first Pacific Coast Conference (PCC) championship. He was named to the first team of the All-Southern Division PCC team in 1949, and voted to the second team in 1950. He was selected in the third round of the 1950 NBA draft by the Capitols.

After the Capitols were disbanded mid-season in 1951, its players were allocated to other teams, and Sawyer was drafted by the Tri-Cities Blackhawks. However, he decided to return to the University of California, Los Angeles, to complete his degree.

Sawyer later became a math teacher and coached basketball at Orange Coast College in Costa Mesa, California.

== NBA career statistics ==
Legend
GP	Games played	GS	Games started	MPG	Minutes per game
FG%	Field goal percentage	3P%	3-point field goal percentage	FT%	Free throw percentage
RPG	Rebounds per game	APG	Assists per game	SPG	Steals per game
BPG	Blocks per game	PPG	Points per game	**Bold**	Career high

=== Regular season ===
Year	Team	GP	FG%	FT%	RPG	APG	PPG
1950–51	Washington	33	.370	.860	3.7	0.8	6.6
Career		33	.370	.860	3.7	0.8	6.6
