= John Jordan (basketball, born 1910) =

American basketball player and coach

Biographical details
- Born: October 23, 1910; Chicago, Illinois, U.S.
- Died: June 13, 1991; Oak Forest, Illinois, U.S.

Playing career
- 1932–1935: Notre Dame

Coaching career (HC unless noted)
- 1950–1951: Loyola (IL)
- 1951–1964: Notre Dame

Head coaching record
- Overall: 214–145 (.596)
- Tournaments: NCAA: 8–6 (.571)

John Jordan (1910–1991) was an American basketball player and coach, best known for coaching the University of Notre Dame's men's basketball team from 1951 to 1964.

Jordan played basketball at Notre Dame in the 1930s and was a teammate of George Ireland, Moose Krause, and Ray Meyer. He was the captain of the Fighting Irish in 1935. After college, he took a coaching job at Mount Carmel High School in Chicago, and remained there until 1949. He spent the 1950–51 basketball season as coach at Loyola University Chicago, then took the reins at Notre Dame the following season. While at Notre Dame, Jordan recorded a 199–131 record and guided his players to five appearances in the NCAA tournament.

He attended Archbishop Quigley Preparatory Seminary in Chicago, graduating in 1929.

After Jordan's coaching career ended, he worked with the Chicago Park District. He died in Oak Forest, Illinois at the age of 81 in 1991.

== Head coaching record ==
Record table
Season	Team	Overall	Conference	Standing	Postseason
Loyola Ramblers (Independent) (1950–1951)
1950–51	Loyola (IL)	15–14			
Loyola (IL):		15–14 (.517)			
Notre Dame Fighting Irish (Independent) (1951–1964)
1951–52	Notre Dame	16–10			
1952–53	Notre Dame	19–5			NCAA Elite Eight
1953–54	Notre Dame	22–3			NCAA Elite Eight
1954–55	Notre Dame	14–10			
1955–56	Notre Dame	9–15			
1956–57	Notre Dame	20–8			NCAA University Division Sweet Sixteen
1957–58	Notre Dame	24–5			NCAA University Division Elite Eight
1958–59	Notre Dame	12–13			
1959–60	Notre Dame	17–9			NCAA University Division first round
1960–61	Notre Dame	12–14			
1961–62	Notre Dame	7–16			
1962–63	Notre Dame	17–9			NCAA University Division first round
1963–64	Notre Dame	10–14			
Notre Dame:		199–131 (.603)			
Total:		214–145 (.596)			
National champion Postseason invitational champion Conference regular season champion Conference regular season and conference tournament champion Division regular season champion Division regular season and conference tournament champion Conference tournament champion
