= 1949–50 Washington State Cougars men's basketball team =

American college basketball season

1949–50 Washington State Cougars men's basketball

PCC Northern Division Champions
- Conference: Pacific Coast Conference

Ranking
- AP: No. 18
- Record: 19–13 (11–5 PCC)
- Head coach: Jack Friel (22nd season)
- Home arena: Bohler Gymnasium

1949–50 Pacific Coast Conference men's basketball standings
	Conf.				Overall
Team	W		L	PCT	W		L	PCT
North
No. 18 Washington State	11	–	5	.688	19	–	13	.594
Washington	8	–	8	.500	19	–	10	.655
Oregon State	8	–	8	.500	13	–	14	.481
Idaho	7	–	9	.438	15	–	17	.469
Oregon	6	–	10	.375	9	–	19	.321
South
No. 7 UCLA †	10	–	2	.833	24	–	7	.774
USC	7	–	5	.583	16	–	8	.667
California	4	–	8	.333	10	–	17	.370
Stanford	3	–	9	.250	11	–	14	.440
† Conference playoff series winner As of 1950; Rankings from AP Poll

The 1949–50 Washington State Cougars men's basketball team represented Washington State College for the 1949–50 NCAA college basketball season. Led by 22nd-year head coach Jack Friel, the Cougars were members of the Pacific Coast Conference and played their home games on campus at Bohler Gymnasium in Pullman, Washington.

The Cougars were 19–11 overall in the regular season and 11–5 in conference play, first place in Northern division. They met Southern division winner UCLA in a best-of-three series in Los Angeles for the PCC title, which the seventh-ranked Bruins swept in two games.

Washington State's next winning record in conference play came seventeen years later, in the 1966–67 season.

== Postseason results ==
Date time, TV	Rank^{#}	Opponent^{#}	Result	Record	Site (attendance) city, state
Pacific Coast Conference Playoff Series
Fri, March 10; 8:00 pm	No. 18	at No. 7 UCLA; Game One	L 58–60	19–12	UCLA Men's Gym (2,700); Los Angeles, California
Sat, March 11; 8:00 pm	No. 18	at No. 7 UCLA; Game Two	L 49–52	19–13	UCLA Men's Gym (2,700); Los Angeles, California
*Non-conference game. ^{#}Rankings from AP Poll. (#) Tournament seedings in parentheses. All times are in Pacific time.
