= 1950–51 Washington Huskies men's basketball team =

American college basketball season

1950–51 Washington Huskies men's basketball

Pacific Coast Conference Champions

NCAA tournament, Regional third place
- Conference: Pacific Coast Conference

Ranking
- Coaches: No. 12
- AP: No. 15
- Record: 24–6 (11–5 PCC)
- Head coach: Tippy Dye (1st season)
- Home arena: Hec Edmundson Pavilion

1950–51 Pacific Coast Conference men's basketball standings
	Conf.				Overall
Team	W		L	PCT	W		L	PCT
North
No. 15 Washington †	11	–	5	.688	24	–	6	.800
Oregon	10	–	6	.625	18	–	13	.581
Washington State	7	–	9	.438	17	–	15	.531
Idaho	6	–	10	.375	15	–	14	.517
Oregon State	6	–	10	.375	14	–	18	.438
South
UCLA	8	–	4	.667	19	–	10	.655
No. 19 USC	8	–	4	.667	21	–	6	.778
Stanford	5	–	7	.417	12	–	14	.462
California	3	–	9	.250	16	–	16	.500
† Conference playoff series winner Rankings from AP Poll

The 1950–51 Washington Huskies men's basketball team represented the University of Washington for the 1950–51 NCAA college basketball season. Led by first-year head coach Tippy Dye, the Huskies were members of the Pacific Coast Conference and played their home games on campus at Hec Edmundson Pavilion in Seattle, Washington.

The Huskies were 20–5 overall in the regular season and 11–5 in conference play; they won the PCC title series with a two-game sweep of Southern division winner UCLA, which extended their home court winning streak to nineteen games.

In the 16-team NCAA tournament, Washington defeated Texas A&M by 22 points in the opener of the West regional in Kansas City, then fell by four to second-ranked Oklahoma A&M. In the regional third place game, the Huskies defeated newly-crowned NIT champion BYU by thirteen points to end the season at 24–6.

Dye was hired in June 1950; he was previously the head coach at Ohio State for four seasons. The Buckeyes were Big Ten champions in the 1949–50 season and made the eight-team NCAA tournament.

Washington returned to the NCAA Tournament two years later in 1953, and advanced to the Final Four.

== Postseason results ==
Date time, TV	Rank^{#}	Opponent^{#}	Result	Record	Site (attendance) city, state
Pacific Coast Conference Playoff Series
Fri, March 9; 8:00 pm	No. 15	UCLA; Game One	W 70–51	21–5	Hec Edmundson Pavilion (9,500); Seattle, Washington
Sat, March 10; 8:00 pm	No. 15	UCLA; Game Two	W 71–54	22–5	Hec Edmundson Pavilion (12,500); Seattle, Washington
NCAA Tournament
Thu, March 22*	No. 15	vs. Texas A&M; First round	W 62–40	23–5	Municipal Auditorium; Kansas City, Missouri
Fri, March 23*; 7:45 pm	No. 15	vs. No. 2 Oklahoma A&M; Regional final (Quarterfinal)	L 57–61	23–6	Municipal Auditorium; Kansas City, Missouri
Sat, March 24*; 6:00 pm	No. 15	vs. No. 11 BYU; Regional third place	W 80–67	24–6	Municipal Auditorium; Kansas City, Missouri
*Non-conference game. ^{#}Rankings from AP Poll. (#) Tournament seedings in parentheses. All times are in Pacific time.
