= George Stanich =

American high jumper (born 1928)

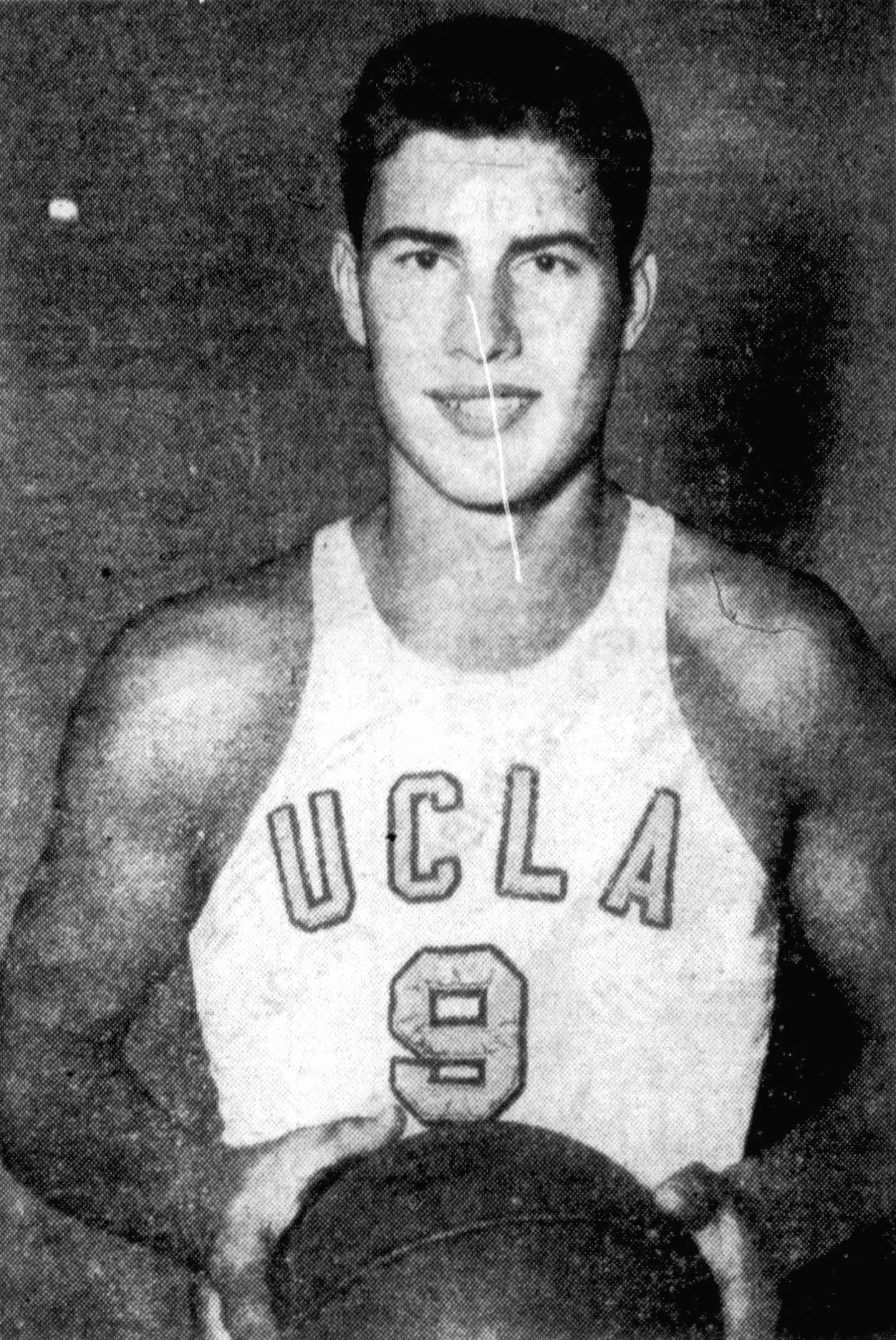
- Stanich, circa 1954

Personal information
- Full name: George Anthony Stanich
- Born: November 4, 1928 (age 98) Sacramento, California, U.S.
- Basketball career

Personal information
- Listed height: 6 ft 3 in (1.91 m)
- Listed weight: 186 lb (84 kg)

Career information
- College: Sacramento CC (1946–1947); UCLA (1947–1950)
- NBA draft: 1950: 2nd round, 21st overall pick
- Drafted by: Rochester Royals
- Position: Guard / Forward

Career history

Coaching
- 1955–1970: El Camino
- 1970–1971: Jugoplastika (assistant)

Career highlights
- As player: 2× First-team All-PCC (1949, 1950); As assistant coach: Yugoslav League champion (1971)
- Stats at Basketball Reference
Medal record
Men's athletics
Representing the United States
Olympic Games
Bronze medal – third place	1948 London	High jump

George Anthony Stanich (born November 4, 1928) is an American former multi-sport athlete who won a bronze medal at the 1948 Summer Olympics in high jump. He played college basketball for the UCLA Bruins, where he was a two-time all-conference player in the Pacific Coast Conference (now the Pac-12 Conference). He is the brother of John Stanich.

== Baseball ==
As a Bruin baseball player, he was a pitcher for 3 seasons, including throwing a 5-hit shutout as a sophomore as UCLA beat USC for the first time in five years. He would become a professional baseball player after graduation, pitching for the Oakland Oaks of the Pacific Coast League, as well as Idaho Falls Russets and Stockton.

== Basketball ==
=== College career ===
Stanich played at Sacramento City College during the 1946–47 season.

As a basketball player at the University of California, Los Angeles, Stanich was a guard and led his team to its first NCAA tournament appearance in 1949–50. He scored 9 points in the East-West All-Star Game and was a first-team All-American (as named by Converse).

Stanich was also an All-American high jumper for the UCLA Bruins track and field team, finishing 4th at the 1949 NCAA Track and Field Championships.

Stanich was inducted into the UCLA Athletic Hall of Fame in 1985.

=== Coaching career ===
Stanich coached basketball at El Camino College from 1955 to 1970 before going on a one-year sabbatical. During the 1970–1971 season, he was an assistant coach to Branko Radović at Jugoplastika in Split, Croatia, where he helped lead the team to the Yugoslav League championship. He retired from El Camino in 1992.

On June 19, 2026, the El Camino gymnasium was named in his honor.

== Olympics ==
The qualification for the high jump at the 1948 Olympic Games in London was held on the morning of July 30, 1948, with the finals later the same day. Stanich was one of twenty men who qualified for the finals which were held in the rain later. The gold medal was won with a jump of 6 ft 6 in (1.98 m). Stanich was one of four competitors who cleared 6 ft 4.75 in (1.95 m). While he thought he had cleared the bar on his last attempt at 6 ft 6 in (1.98 m), his trail leg hit the bar. Officials from the International Amateur Athletic Federation initially announced that fewer misses would be used to determine the finishing places of the four tied jumpers; the IAAF then announced all four would share second place and the silver medal. Days later they reversed themselves again, and Stanich became the bronze medal winner.
