= 1950–51 NCAA men's basketball rankings =

- Season: 1950–51
- NCAA Tournament: 1951
- NCAA Tournament Champions: Kentucky
NCAA men's basketball rankings


The 1950–51 NCAA men's basketball rankings was made up of two human polls, the AP Poll and the Coaches Poll. This was the first season with both polls, as the Coaches Poll (UP) was introduced.

== Legend ==
	Increase in ranking
	Decrease in ranking
	New to rankings from previous week
Italics	Number of first place votes
(#–#)	Win–loss record
т	Tied with team above or below also with this symbol

== AP Poll ==
	Week 2 Dec. 18	Week 3 Dec. 25	Week 4 Jan. 3	Week 5 Jan. 8	Week 6 Jan. 15	Week 7 Jan. 22	Week 8 Jan. 29	Week 9 Feb. 5	Week 10 Feb. 12	Week 11 Feb. 19	Week 12 Feb. 26	Final Mar. 6	
1.	Kentucky (5–0)	Kentucky (6–0)	Bradley (13–0)	Bradley (15–0)	Oklahoma A&M (15–0)	Kentucky (13–1)	Kentucky (14–1)	Kentucky (18–1)	Kentucky (19–1)	Kentucky (22–1)	Kentucky (24–1)	Kentucky (27–2)	1.
2.	Bradley (6–0)	Bradley (9–0)	Oklahoma A&M (12–0)	Oklahoma A&M (13–0)	Kentucky (10–1)	Long Island (15–0)	Oklahoma A&M (16–1)	Oklahoma A&M (19–1)	Oklahoma A&M (21–1)	Oklahoma A&M (23–1)	Oklahoma State (25–1)	Oklahoma A&M (26–3)	2.
3.	NC State (6–0)	Oklahoma A&M (9–0)	Kentucky (7–1)	Kentucky (9–1)	Bradley (16–2)	Oklahoma A&M (16–1)	Indiana (13–1)	Indiana (13–1)	Kansas State (17–2)	Columbia (17–0)	Columbia (19–0)	Columbia (21–0)	3.
4.	Indiana (4–0)	Long Island (6–0)	Long Island (8–0)	Long Island (9–0)	Long Island (11–0)	Bradley (18–2)	Long Island (16–1)	Kansas State (16–2)	Columbia (15–0)	Indiana (15–3)	Kansas State (18–3)	Kansas State (21–3)	4.
5.	Oklahoma A&M (5–0)	Indiana (6–0)	Saint Louis (9–2)	Saint Louis (11–2)	St. John's (11–2)	Indiana (12–1)	Bradley (18–3)	Bradley (20–3)	Saint Louis (18–4)	Kansas State (17–3)	Bradley (26–4)	Illinois (19–3)	5.
6.	CCNY (4–1)	NC State (7–1)	Indiana (7–1)	Indiana (8–1)	Indiana (9–1)	St. John's (12–2)	Columbia (12–0)	Columbia (12–0)	Indiana (13–2)	Saint Louis (19–5)	Illinois (17–3)	Bradley (28–4)	6.
7.	Long Island (3–0)	Villanova (6–0)	NC State (11–1)	NC State (13–1)	Columbia (10–0)	Columbia (12–0)	Kansas State (13–2)	St. John's (15–2)	St. John's (18–2)	Bradley (24–4)	Indiana (16–3)	Indiana (19–3)	7.
8.	Missouri (3–1)	Columbia (7–0)	Villanova (8–0)	Columbia (8–0)	Saint Louis (12–3)	NC State (17–2)	NC State (19–2)	Saint Louis (16–4)	Bradley (21–4)	St. John's (19–3)	NC State (25–4)	NC State (28–4)	8.
9.	UCLA (4–1)	Missouri (4–1)	Kansas State (9–2)	Kansas State (10–2)	NC State (15–2)	Kansas State (12–2)	St. John's (13–2)	Villanova (16–1)	NC State (21–4)	NC State (23–4)	St. John's (20–3)	St. John's (22–3)	9.
10.	Toledo (7–0)	Kansas (5–1)	Wyoming (12–0)	Wyoming (12–1)	Kansas State (11–2)	Saint Louis (13–4)	Saint Louis (14–4)	NC State (19–4)	Villanova (18–2)	Illinois (16–3)	Saint Louis (20–6)	Saint Louis (21–7)	10.
11.	Kansas (4–1)	CCNY (6–2)	St. John's (9–2)	St. John's (10–2)	Villanova (12–1)	Villanova (13–1)	Villanova (14–1)	Cincinnati (11–1)	Illinois (13–3)	Arizona (21–4)	BYU (23–5)	BYU (24–7)	11.
12.	Washington (4–0)	St. John's (7–2)	Washington (7–0)	Washington (9–0)	Toledo (12–2)	USC (14–2)	BYU (16–4)	Long Island (16–4)	BYU (20–4)	BYU (21–5)	Arizona (22–4)	Arizona (24–4)	12.
13.	St. John's (5–1)	Toledo (8–1)	Duquesne (9–0)	USC (10–1)	Wyoming (14–1)	Siena (13–1)	USC (14–2)	Arizona (16–3)	USC (18–2)	USC (19–3)	Toledo (20–6)	Dayton (23–4)	13.
14.	Notre Dame (4–0)	Wyoming (9–0)	Columbia (7–0)	Illinois (9–2)	Illinois (10–2)	Arizona (13–2)	Illinois (11–3)	BYU (18–4)	Louisville (17–2)	Dayton (20–4)	Dayton (23–4)	Toledo (23–6)	14.
15.	BYU (5–1)	Washington (6–0)	Cornell (9–0)	Duquesne (10–1)	Washington (10–1)	Cincinnati (10–1)	Arizona (14–3)	USC (16–2)	Cincinnati (12–2)	Villanova (20–4)	Villanova (22–4)	Washington (20–5)	15.
16.	Oklahoma (3–0)	La Salle (6–1)	Arizona (8–2)	Villanova (10–1)	Cincinnati (9–1)	Illinois (11–3)	Cincinnati (10–1)	Illinois (11–3)	Arizona (18–3)	Long Island (20–4)	Beloit (17–4)	Murray State (21–6)	16.
17.	Cincinnati (3–0)	Cincinnati (5–0)	Cincinnati (6–0)	Kansas (9–2)	St. Bonaventure (10–0)	La Salle (12–3)	Kansas (11–3)	Louisville (14–2)	Dayton (18–4)	Oklahoma (13–7)	UCLA (16–8)	Cincinnati (17–3)	17.
18.	Villanova (4–0)	Cornell (6–0)	Princeton (7–0)	Toledo (11–1)	Siena (13–1)	Oklahoma (9–5)	Oklahoma (9–6)	Dayton (15–3)	Beloit (14–3)	Cincinnati (13–2)	USC (20–4)	Siena (18–6)	18.
19.	Cornell (5–0)	West Virginia (6–0)	Toledo (9–1)	La Salle (9–1)	USC (12–2)	BYU (14–4)	UCLA (9–7)	Siena (15–2)	Long Island (17–4)	Washington (17–4)	Washington (18–5)	USC (21–5)	19.
20.	Kansas State (4–2)	Illinois (5–1)	Kansas (7–2)	Princeton (8–0)	Duquesne (11–1)	Wyoming (15–4)	Toledo (14–3)	Kansas (11–5)	Seattle (27–2)	Beloit (15–3)	Murray State (21–6)	Villanova (23–5)	20.
	Week 2 Dec. 18	Week 3 Dec. 25	Week 4 Jan. 3	Week 5 Jan. 8	Week 6 Jan. 15	Week 7 Jan. 22	Week 8 Jan. 29	Week 9 Feb. 5	Week 10 Feb. 12	Week 11 Feb. 19	Week 12 Feb. 26	Final Mar. 6	
		Dropped: UCLA (4–4); Notre Dame; BYU (7–1); Oklahoma; Kansas State (6–2)	Dropped: Missouri (5–3); CCNY (6–4); La Salle; West Virginia; Illinois (7–2)	Dropped: Cornell; Arizona (9–2); Cincinnati (8–1)	Dropped: Kansas (10–2); La Salle; Princeton	Dropped: Toledo; Washington; St. Bonaventure; Duquesne	Dropped: Siena; La Salle; Wyoming	Dropped: Oklahoma; UCLA; Toledo	Dropped: Siena; Kansas	Dropped: Louisville; Seattle	Dropped: Long Island; Oklahoma; Cincinnati	Dropped: Beloit (18–5); UCLA (19–8)	

== UP Poll ==
	Preseason	Week 1 Dec. 12	Week 2 Dec. 19	Week 3 Dec. 26	Week 4 Jan. 3	Week 5 Jan. 9	Week 6 Jan. 16	Week 7 Jan. 23	Week 8 Jan. 30	Week 9 Feb. 6	Week 10 Feb. 13	Week 11 Feb. 20	Week 12 Feb. 27	Week 13 Mar. 6	Final Mar. 9	
1.	CCNY	Kentucky (2–0)	Kentucky (5–0)	Kentucky (6–0)	Bradley (13–0)	Bradley (15–0)	Oklahoma A&M (15–0)	Kentucky (13–1)	Kentucky (14–1)	Kentucky (18–1)	Kentucky (19–1)	Kentucky (22–1)	Kentucky (24–1)	Oklahoma A&M (26–3)		1.
2.	Bradley	Bradley (4–0)	Bradley (6–0)	Bradley (9–0)	Kentucky (7–1)	Oklahoma A&M (13–0)	Kentucky (10–1)	Long Island (15–0)	Oklahoma A&M (16–1)	Oklahoma A&M (19–1)	Oklahoma A&M (21–1)	Oklahoma A&M (23–1)	Oklahoma State (25–1)	Kentucky (27–2)		2.
3.	Kentucky	NC State (4–0)	NC State (6–0)	Oklahoma A&M (9–0)	Oklahoma A&M (12–0)	Kentucky (9–1)	Long Island (11–0)	Oklahoma A&M (16–1)	Long Island (16–1)	Indiana (13–1)	Kansas State (17–2)	Indiana (15–3)	Kansas State (18–3)	Kansas State (21–3)		3.
4.	NC State	Kansas (3–0)	Oklahoma A&M (5–0)	Long Island (6–0)	Long Island (8–0)	Long Island (9–0)	Bradley (16–2)	Indiana (12–1)	Indiana (13–1)	Kansas State (16–2)	Columbia (15–0)	Columbia (17–0)	Columbia (19–0)	Illinois (19–3)		4.
5.	Kansas	Oklahoma A&M (3–0)	Indiana (4–0)	Indiana (6–0)	Indiana (7–1)	Indiana (8–1)	Indiana (9–1)	Bradley (18–2)	Kansas State (13–2)	Bradley (20–3)	Indiana (13–2)	Kansas State (17–3)	Illinois (17–3)	Columbia (21–0)		5.
6.	Oklahoma A&M	CCNY (3–1)	CCNY (4–1)	NC State (7–1)	NC State (11–1)	Saint Louis (11–2)	St. John's (11–2)	St. John's (12–2)	Bradley (18–3)	Columbia (12–0)	St. John's (18–2)	Saint Louis (19–5)	Indiana (16–3)	NC State (28–4)		6.
7.	Long Island	Long Island (2–0)	Long Island (3–0)	Missouri (4–1)	Saint Louis (9–2)	NC State (13–1)	Kansas State (11–2)	Kansas State (12–2)	St. John's (13–2)	St. John's (15–2)	Saint Louis (18–4)	Bradley (24–4)	St. John's (20–3)	Bradley (28–4)		7.
8.	Iowa	St. John's (4–0)	St. John's (5–1)	St. John's (7–2)	Kansas State (9–2)	Kansas State (10–2)	Saint Louis (12–3)	Columbia (12–0)	Columbia (12–0)	Saint Louis (16–4)	BYU (20–4)	NC State (23–4)	Bradley (26–4)	Indiana (19–3)		8.
9.	St. John's	Kansas State (3–1)	Missouri (3–1)	CCNY (6–2)	St. John's (9–2)	Columbia (8–0)	NC State (15–2)	NC State (17–2)	NC State (19–2)	BYU (18–4)	Bradley (21–4)	St. John's (19–3)	NC State (25–4)	St. John's (22–3)		9.
10.	Indiana	Indiana (2–0)	Kansas (4–1)	Kansas (5–1)	Wyoming (12–0)	St. John's (10–2)	Columbia (10–0)	Saint Louis (13–4)	Saint Louis (14–4)	NC State (19–4)	NC State (21–4)	BYU (21–5)	BYU (23–5)	BYU (24–7)		10.
11.	UCLA	Missouri (2–1)	Washington (4–0)	Washington (6–0)	Villanova (8–0) т	Wyoming (12–1)	Villanova (12–1) т	BYU (14–4)	BYU (16–4)	USC (16–2)	USC (18–2)	Illinois (16–3)	Saint Louis (20–6)	Saint Louis (21–7)		11.
12.	Kansas State	BYU (5–1)	Duquesne (5–0)	Villanova (6–0)	Washington (7–0) т	Washington (9–0)	Illinois (10–2) т	Illinois (11–3)	Villanova (14–1)	Villanova (16–1)	Illinois (13–3)	Long Island (20–4)	USC (20–4)	Washington (20–5)		12.
13.	Arkansas т	Washington (2–0)	Saint Louis (6–0)	BYU (7–1)	Cincinnati (6–0)	Villanova (10–1)	Wyoming (14–1)	Cincinnati (10–1)	USC (14–2)	Illinois (11–3)	Villanova (18–2)	USC (19–3)	Arizona (22–4) т	Arizona (24–4)		13.
14.	Syracuse т	UCLA (2–1) т	Oklahoma (3–0)	Wyoming (9–0)	Columbia (7–0)	Kansas (9–2)	Cincinnati (9–1)	Villanova (13–1)	Illinois (11–3) т	Long Island (16–4)	Cincinnati (12–2)	Washington (17–4)	Washington (18–5) т	Beloit (18–5)		14.
15.	Western Kentucky т	Minnesota (2–1) т	BYU (5–1)	Kansas State (6–2)	Kansas (7–2)	Duquesne (10–1)	Kansas (10–2)	USC (14–2)	Cincinnati (10–1) т	Cincinnati (11–1)	Long Island (17–4)	Cincinnati (13–2)	Villanova (22–4)	USC (21–5)		15.
16.	Washington	Syracuse (3–1)	UCLA (4–1) т	Duquesne (6–0)	CCNY (6–4)	La Salle (9–1) т	Washington (10–1)	Arizona (13–2)	Kansas (11–3)	Washington (13–4)	Washington (15–4)	Oregon (16–11)	Oregon (17–12)	Vanderbilt (19–8)		16.
17.	DePaul т	DePaul (3–2)	Toledo (7–0) т	Cincinnati (5–0)	Oklahoma (4–3)	Arizona (9–2) т	USC (12–2)	NYU (6–2)	Washington State (14–8)	Kansas (11–5)	Arizona (18–3)	Villanova (20–4)	Beloit (17–4)	Siena (18–6) т		17.
18.	Illinois т	Iowa (1–2)	Cincinnati (3–0)	Toledo (8–1)	Arizona (8–2)	Cincinnati (8–1) т	Duquesne (11–1)	Wyoming (15–4)	UCLA (9–7)	Arizona (16–3)	NYU (10–3)	Arizona (21–4)	Cincinnati (14–3)	Villanova (23–5) т		18.
19.	Ohio State	Saint Louis (4–0)	Kansas State (4–2)	Saint Louis (7–1)	Duquesne (9–0) т	USC (10–1) т	Arizona (12–2) т	Kansas (10–3) т	NYU (7–2)	NYU (9–2)	Kansas (10–3)	Oklahoma (13–7)	St. Bonaventure (17–4)	Dayton (23–4) т		19.
20.	BYU	Illinois (2–1) т Holy Cross (1–0) т	Illinois (3–1)	La Salle (6–1)	Missouri (5–3) т	Iowa (6–2) т	BYU (12–4) т	Washington State (13–8) т	Arizona (14–3)	Holy Cross (12–3) т Texas A&M (10–7) т Washington State (15–9) т	Oklahoma (11–7)	Beloit (15–3)		St. Bonaventure (18–5) т		20.
	Preseason	Week 1 Dec. 12	Week 2 Dec. 19	Week 3 Dec. 26	Week 4 Jan. 3	Week 5 Jan. 9	Week 6 Jan. 16	Week 7 Jan. 23	Week 8 Jan. 30	Week 9 Feb. 6	Week 10 Feb. 13	Week 11 Feb. 20	Week 12 Feb. 27	Week 13 Mar. 6	Final Mar. 9	
		Dropped: Arkansas; Western Kentucky; Ohio State	Dropped: Minnesota; Syracuse; DePaul; Iowa; Holy Cross	Dropped: UCLA (4–4); Oklahoma; Illinois (5–1)	Dropped: BYU; Toledo (9–1); La Salle	Dropped: CCNY; Oklahoma; Missouri	Dropped: La Salle; Iowa	Dropped: Washington; Duquesne	Dropped: Wyoming	Dropped: UCLA	Dropped: Holy Cross; Texas A&M; Washington State	Dropped: NYU; Kansas	Dropped: Oklahoma	Dropped: Oregon; Cincinnati (17–3)	None	
