= Jerry Norman (basketball) =

American former college basketball player and coach

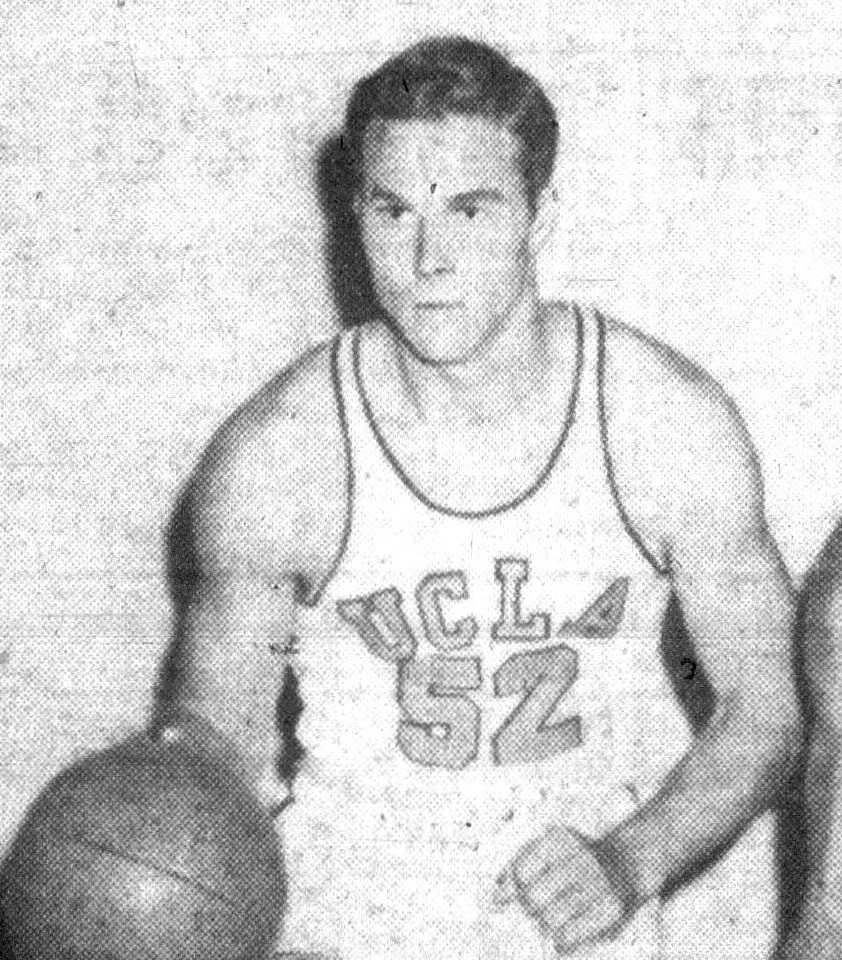
- Norman, c. 1951

Personal information
- Born: 1929 or 1930 (age 96–97)

Career information
- High school: Washington (Los Angeles, California)
- College: East Los Angeles (1947–1948); UCLA (1949–1952)
- NBA draft: 1952: undrafted
- Position: Forward
- Coaching career: 1956–1968

Career history

Coaching
- 1956–1957: West Covina HS
- 1957–1968: UCLA (assistant)

Career highlights
- As player: First-team All-PCC (1952); As coach: 4× NCAA champion (1964, 1965, 1967, 1968)

Jerry Norman (born 1929 or 1930) is an American former college basketball player and coach. He was an assistant coach under John Wooden with the UCLA Bruins for 11 seasons, helping Wooden earn the first four of his record 10 national titles. He is enshrined in the UCLA Athletics Hall of Fame.

Norman played basketball at UCLA and was co-captain during his senior year, when he was named first-team all-conference in the Pacific Coast Conference (PCC). After serving in the United States Navy and coaching in high school, he rejoined Wooden at UCLA as an assistant coach. He was a top recruiter for the Bruins, helping the program expand its recruiting radius from local to nationwide. Norman also introduced a pressuring zone press defense to UCLA, which was instrumental to their first two national championships. He retired from coaching in 1968 in order to enter the much more lucrative financial industry.

== Early life ==
Norman attended Horace Mann Jr. High and Washington High in Los Angeles. After graduating high school in 1947, he enrolled at East Los Angeles College, where he led the Metropolitan Conference in scoring and was named first-team All-Southern California Junior College. He received some athletic scholarship offers from Division I schools, and accepted UCLA's offer at the urging of Eddie Sheldrake, his best friend and a former Washington High player who was at UCLA.

== College career ==
In Norman's sophomore year in 1949–50, UCLA qualified for the NCAA tournament, the first in Coach John Wooden's career. The following season, Norman was kicked off the team for two weeks after talking to a teammate during practice and not paying attention to Wooden. Sheldrake, who was also friendly with Wooden, convinced the two to reconcile. In 1951–52, Norman was co-captain of the team with fellow senior Don Johnson, and the Bruins won the PCC title and qualified for the 1952 NCAA tournament. Norman and Johnson were unanimously selected first-team All-PCC.

== Professional career ==
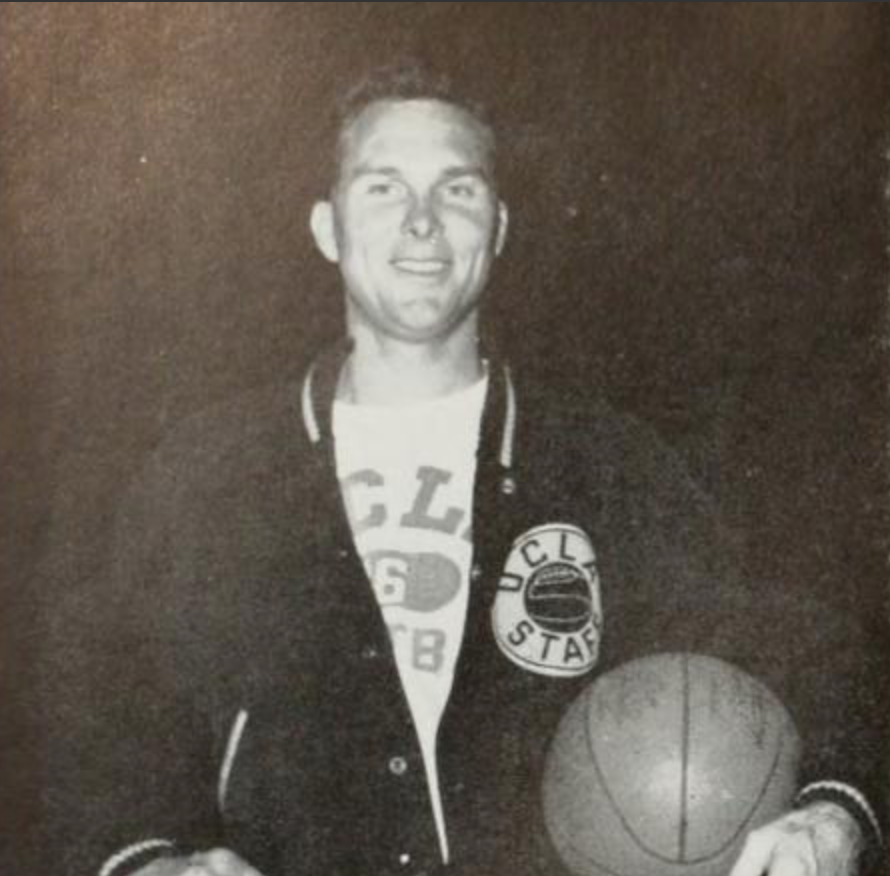
Norman coached UCLA's freshman team before becoming a varsity assistant under John Wooden.

After graduating in 1952, Norman served 3 1/2 years in the Navy before teaching and coaching for a year at West Covina High, where Wooden's brother was the principal. In the fall of 1957, Norman returned to UCLA after accepting a teaching position in the physical education department. Wooden asked him to moonlight as the coach of the freshman basketball team, and Norman compiled a 94–22 record in six seasons while successfully employing a zone press. In July 1959, Norman became a varsity assistant.

According to sportswriter Seth Davis, author of Wooden: A Coach’s Life, Norman is deserving of more credit for Wooden's success than people generally attribute to him. Wooden began coaching UCLA in 1948–49, but the Bruins never advanced past the first round of the NCAA tournament until after Norman was hired. During the 1963–64 season, Norman convinced a reluctant Wooden to use the zone press, which the team had never utilized before. The Bruins had employed a man-to-man press with some success in 1962–63, but it had been ineffective in their opening-game of the NCAA tournament—a 93–79 blowout loss to Arizona State. Norman instead proposed a 2–2–1 full-court zone press, which quickened the pace of the game and was influential in the first two national titles won by the Bruins, who were undersized.

Norman was also UCLA's top recruiter, which complemented Wooden's aversion to recruiting. He recruited 15 players who were later inducted into the UCLA Athletics Hall of Fame, including two players enshrined in the National Collegiate Basketball Hall of Fame: Lew Alcindor (now known as Kareem Abdul-Jabbar) and Gail Goodrich. After becoming Wooden's top assistant, Norman encouraged UCLA athletic director J. D. Morgan to expand the recruiting budget and extend their recruiting from California to nationwide. Previously, Wooden had a limited budget and was satisfied with landing players locally. Under Norman, UCLA's recruits included Alcindor from New York, Walt Hazzard from Philadelphia, and Lucius Allen from Kansas.

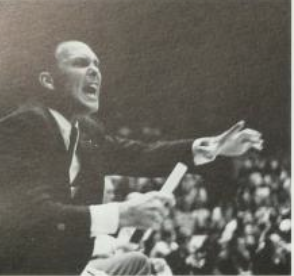
Norman considered quitting before his final season at UCLA.

Prior to the 1967–68 season, Norman contemplated quitting. He had grown weary of the workload and stress, and lamented his pay. His $14,000 salary was not sufficient to support his wife and children. Wooden himself was making only $17,000, less than contemporaries such as Dean Smith, who was estimated to have been making $85,000 at the time. Norman had been working part-time in the financial industry with friends, and was primed to transition full-time. Morgan convinced him to stay, but Norman warned that it would likely be his last season. UCLA claimed their fourth national title in five seasons. In a rout of Houston in the semifinals of the NCAA tournament, Wooden credited Norman for devising the diamond-and-one defense that the Bruins used to contain Elvin Hayes, who was averaging 37.7 points per game but was held to only 10. The win avenged an upset loss to the Cougars in The Game of the Century earlier in the season. Wooden's four titles, each with Norman as his assistant, matched the then-record held by Kentucky coach Adolph Rupp.

Morgan promised Norman that if he stayed, he would become the Bruins' head coach once Wooden retired, which ended up being seven years later. “If he’d paid Coach [Wooden] $100,000 like he deserved, and if I had gotten $50,000 I would have stayed,” Norman said. According to Morgan, Wooden never asked for a raise. In his final year in 1975, Wooden's salary maxed out at $32,000, and he finished his career with a record 10 national titles. Upon leaving UCLA in 1968 after 11 seasons with the team, Norman became a stockbroker, earning $60,000 in his first year. He enjoyed a successful business career and became a multi-millionaire.

In 1986, Norman was inducted into the UCLA Athletics Hall of Fame.

== Personal life ==
Norman and his wife, June, were married for 63 years. She died in 2014. Together, they had three children and four grandchildren.
