= 1950–51 Oklahoma A&M Aggies men's basketball team =

American college basketball season

1950–51 Oklahoma A&M Aggies men's basketball

NCAA men's Division I tournament, Final Four MVC Season Champions
- Conference: Missouri Valley Conference

Ranking
- Coaches: No. 2
- AP: No. 2
- Record: 29–6 (12–2 MVC)
- Head coach: Henry Iba
- Home arena: Gallagher Hall

1950–51 Missouri Valley Conference men's basketball standings
	Conf.				Overall
Team	W		L	PCT	W		L	PCT
No. 2 Oklahoma A&M	12	–	2	.857	29	–	6	.829
No. 6 Bradley	11	–	3	.786	32	–	6	.842
No. 10 Saint Louis	11	–	3	.786	22	–	8	.733
Detroit	7	–	7	.500	17	–	14	.548
Wichita Municipal	5	–	9	.357	9	–	16	.360
Drake	4	–	10	.286	11	–	14	.440
Tulsa	4	–	10	.286	10	–	17	.370
Houston	2	–	12	.143	11	–	17	.393
Rankings from AP Poll

The 1950–51 Oklahoma A&M Aggies men's basketball team represented Oklahoma A&M College, now known as Oklahoma State University, in NCAA competition in the 1950–51 season.

== NCAA tournament ==
- West
  - Oklahoma A&M 50, Montana State 46
  - Oklahoma A&M 61, Washington 57
- Final Four
  - Kansas State 68, Oklahoma A&M 44
- Third Place Game
  - Illinois 61, Oklahoma A&M 46

== Team players drafted into the NBA ==
Round	Pick	Player	NBA club
4	40	Gale McArthur	Minneapolis Lakers
