= Student Activities Center (UCLA) =

Multi-purpose building in Los Angeles

Coordinates: 34.07158°N 118.444086°W

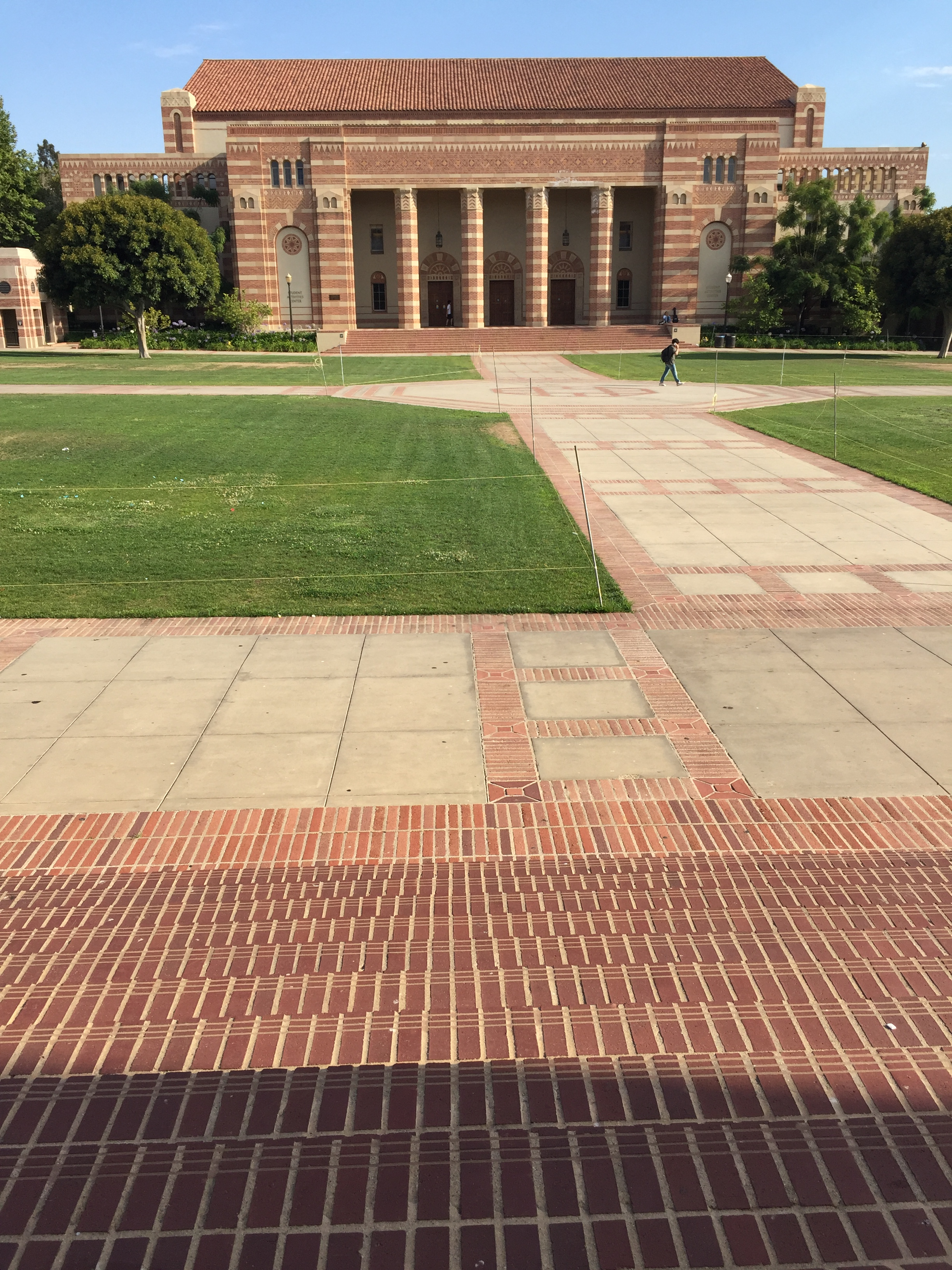
The Student Activities Center in July 2017.

The Men's Gym on the campus of UCLA, now known as the Student Activities Center, is a 2,000 seat multi-purpose building in Los Angeles. It opened in 1932. It was home to the UCLA Bruins men's basketball teams until Pauley Pavilion opened for the 1965–66 basketball season. It was informally known as the "B. O. barn." In 1955, the Los Angeles city Fire Marshal declared the building unsafe for a crowd of greater than 1,300. UCLA basketball games then also were played at the Pan-Pacific Auditorium, the Los Angeles Memorial Sports Arena and other venues around Los Angeles.

The building was also home to and continues to house the Departments of Military Science (Army ROTC - established in 1920 when UCLA was located at the Vermont Avenue campus and known as the Southern Branch of the University of California), Naval Science (Navy ROTC - added in 1938) and Aerospace Studies (Air Force ROTC - added in 1949).

The building is located at the bottom of Janss steps across Bruin Walk from Ackerman Union and below Powell Library.

== Gallery ==
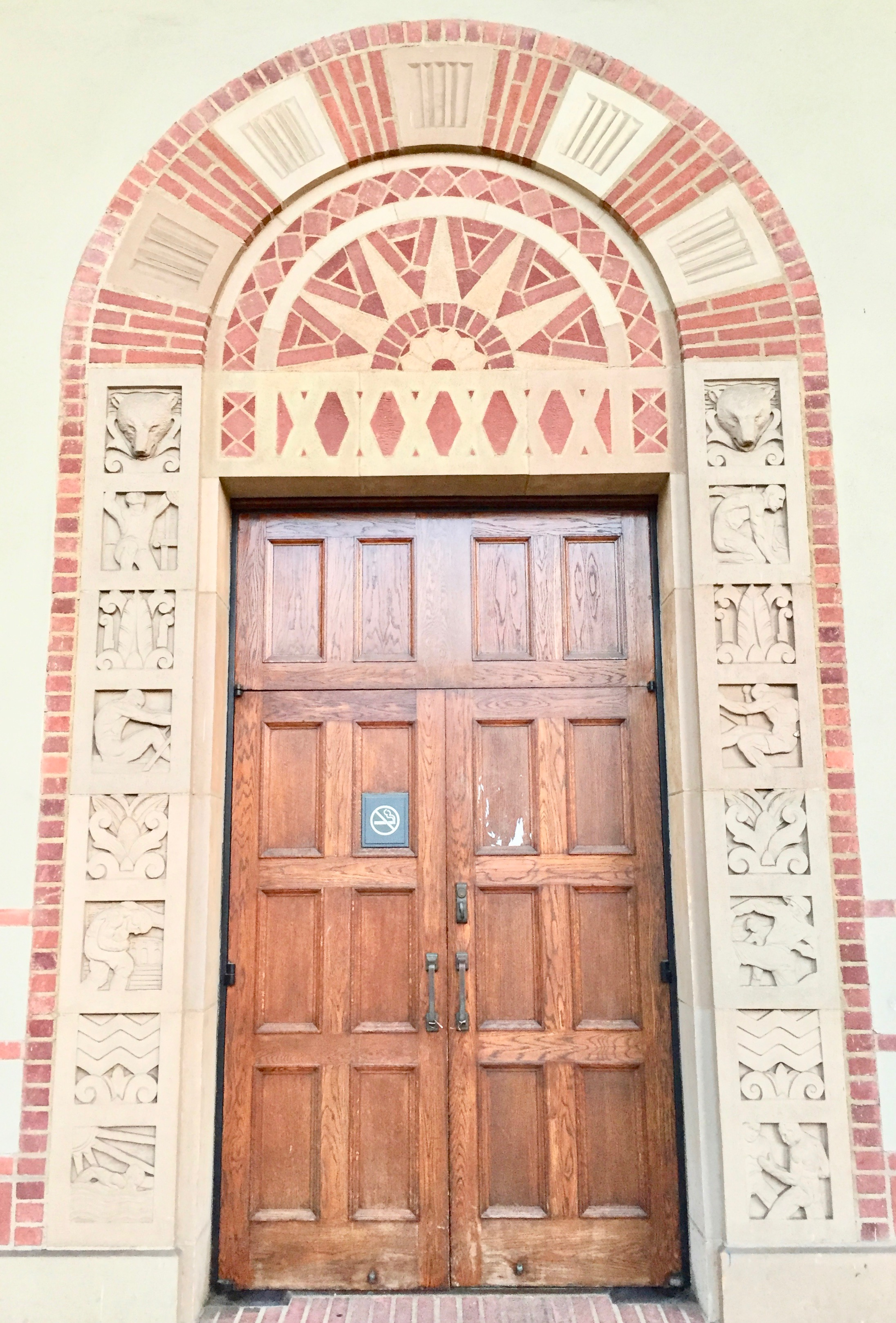
A doorway at the Student Activities Center.

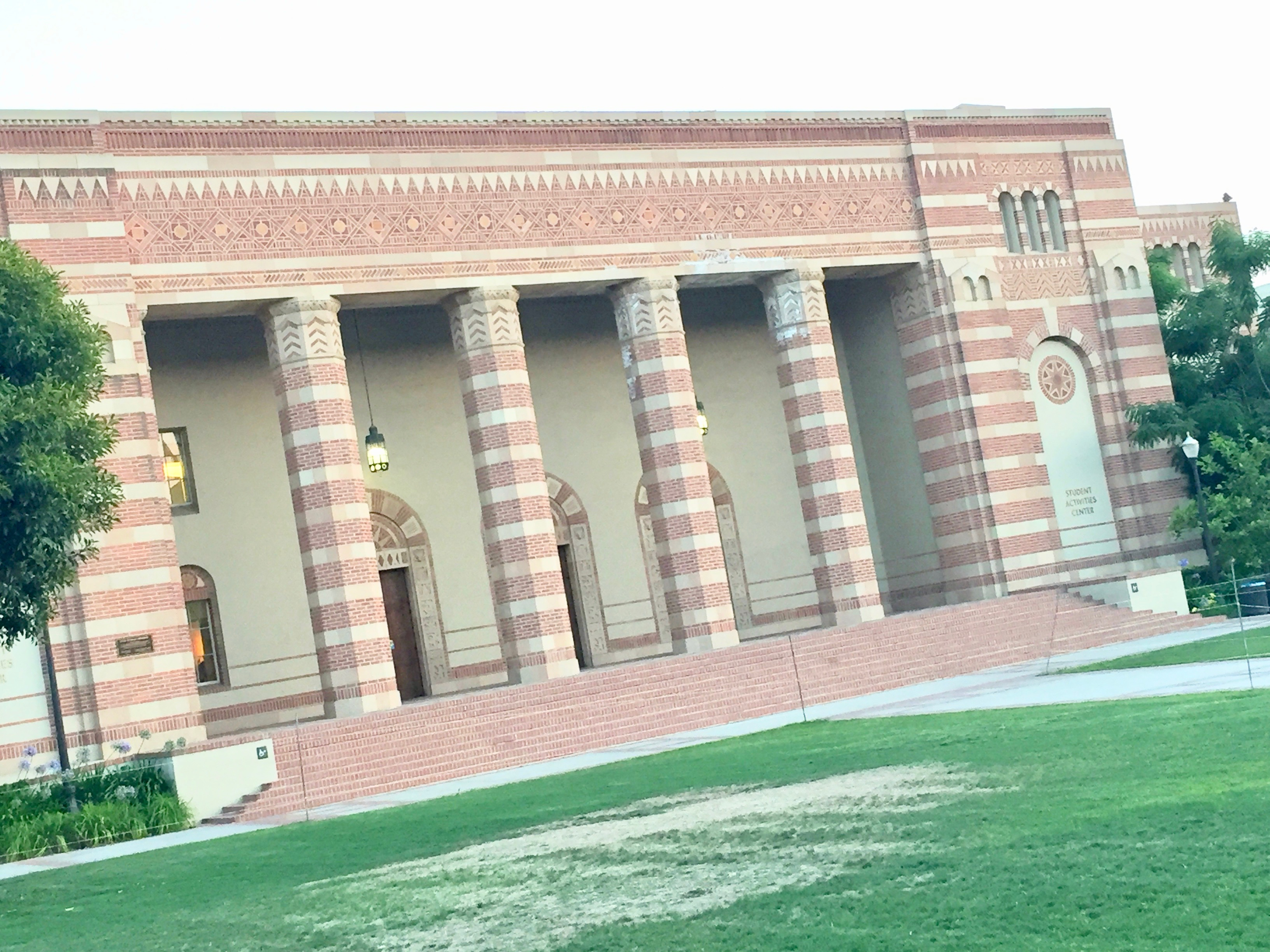
A partial westward view of the Student Activities Center.
