= Pacific Coast Conference =

Former American college athletic conference

- Association: NCAA
- Founded: December 2, 1915
- Folded: June 30, 1959
- Replaced by: Athletic Association of Western Universities
- No. of teams: 9 (final), 10 (total)
- Region: Pacific Coast, Mountain States

Locations
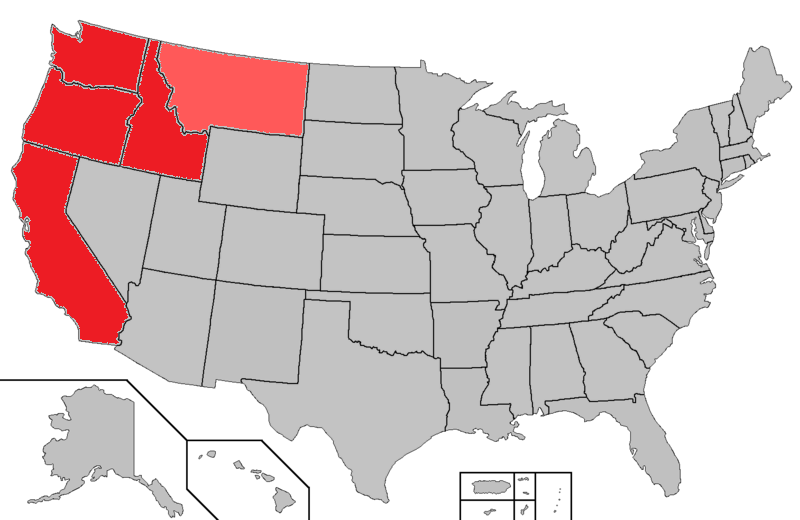

The Pacific Coast Conference (PCC) was a collegiate athletic conference in the United States which existed from 1915 to 1959. Though the Pac-12 Conference claims the PCC's history as part of its own, with eight of the ten PCC members (including all four original PCC charter members) in the Pac-12 for many years, the older league had a completely different charter and was disbanded in 1959 due to a major crisis and scandal.

Established on December 2, 1915, its four charter members were the University of California (now University of California, Berkeley), the University of Washington, the University of Oregon, and Oregon Agricultural College (now Oregon State University).

== History ==
=== Formation ===
The Pacific Coast Conference was formed during the annual meeting of the Northwest Conference on December 2, 1915, at the Imperial Hotel in Portland, Oregon.

During these sessions the University of California sought to join with the six Northwest schools. The Golden Bears had recently returned to the American game after a decade playing rugby and hoped to expand their competition in football. Their 1915 team had scheduled and played two games versus Washington one month earlier.

Also at issue was the Freshman Rule, which barred first-year students from athletic eligibility. California had adopted the rule while their tradition rival Stanford had not, disrupting their annual competition. In the Northwest, Washington supported adopting the Freshman Rule while Idaho and Whitman, with much smaller student bodies, required freshmen to fill out their teams.

After long discussion, California's proposal to join with the Northwest Conference schools was turned down and the Northwest Conference retained freshman eligibility.

Late that evening, Washington and California's representatives held a meeting with Oregon in order to persuade them into a scheduling agreement between the three large state universities, adopting the Freshman Rule. Oregon agreed, on the condition that the Oregon Agricultural College was admitted as well. OAC agreed, on the condition that the Washington Agricultural College would be admitted if and when they later applied.

Thus the Pacific Coast Conference was formed between California, Washington, Oregon, and Oregon Agricultural. The new conference adopted the Freshman Rule, and Dean Arthur R. Priest of Washington was elected as the organization's first president.

Washington and the Oregon schools retained their membership in the Northwest Conference, maintaining a dual-conference agreement that would last until the collapse of the old Northwest Conference in 1925.

=== Before the crisis ===
Rivalries between the Pacific Coast Conference schools grew beyond athletics, with animosities around educational, financial and state rivalries. The tensions between the California and Northwest schools extended to Edwin Pauley, a regent of the University of California, disliking the member universities in the Pacific Northwest enough to advocate that the California institutions leave the Pacific Coast Conference to form a "California Conference."

The PCC had a history of being very strict with regards to its standards; it suspended the University of Southern California from the conference in 1924, performed a critical self-study in 1932, and a voluminous two-million-word report was compiled by Edwin Atherton in 1939. The PCC had a paid commissioner, an elaborate constitution, a formal code of conduct, and a system for reporting student-athlete eligibility. Following the submission of his report, Atherton was promptly hired as commissioner in 1940, and served until his death four years later, He was succeeded by his assistant, Victor O. Schmidt.

Montana departed the conference in 1950 to join the Skyline Eight.

The conference was wracked by scandal in 1951. Charges were made and confirmed that University of Oregon football coach Jim Aiken had violated the conference code for financial aid and athletic subsidies. After Aiken was compelled to resign, Oregon urged the PCC to look at similar abuses by UCLA football coach Red Sanders. The conference spent five years attempting to reform itself. In 1956, the scandal became public.

=== The crisis ===
The scandal first broke at Washington, when in January 1956, several discontented players staged a mutiny against their football coach, John Cherberg. After the coach was fired, the PCC followed up on charges of a slush fund. The PCC found evidence of the prohibited activities of the Greater Washington Advertising Fund run by Roscoe C. "Torchy" Torrance, and in May imposed sanctions.

In March, allegations of prohibited payments made by two booster clubs associated with UCLA, the Bruin Bench and the Young Men's Club of Westwood, were published in Los Angeles newspapers. UCLA refused for ten weeks to allow PCC officials to proceed in their investigation. Finally, UCLA admitted that, "all members of the football coaching staff had, for several years, known of the unsanctioned payments to student athletes and had cooperated with the booster club members or officers, who actually administered the program by actually referring student athletes to them for such aid." The scandal thickened as a UCLA alumnus and member of the UCLA athletic advisory board blew the whistle on a secret fund for payments in violation of PCC rules to University of Southern California players, known as the Southern California Educational Foundation. This same alumnus also blew the whistle on Cal's phony work program for athletes known as the San Francisco Gridiron Club, with an extension in the Los Angeles area known as the South Seas Fund.

In 1957, the conference fired Vic Schmidt, the commissioner. He had been tasked with cleaning up the conference, and had imposed sanctions on UCLA, including suspending athletes and prohibiting participation in the Rose Bowl for three years.

=== Aftershocks and disbandment ===
The first major reaction came from the University of California system. Robert Sproul, president of the University of California, along with the chancellors of Berkeley and UCLA, drafted a "Five Point Plan", emphasizing academic eligibility standards, setting the two UC campuses apart from the PCC and laying the groundwork for their departure. For Sproul the PCC dispute was not just about athletics; at stake was the ideal of a unified University of California that enjoyed statewide support. This ideal collided with aspirations of UCLA alumni who believed that Sproul's vision would always favor the Berkeley campus at the expense of the younger UCLA campus.

Oregon State College president A. L. Strand wrote, "The reasons for California and UCLA dropping out are as different as night and day... the significance of the whole affair was the union of Berkeley and UCLA... admissions and scholarship had nothing to do with the withdrawals . . . the marriage of this desire on the part of Berkeley with the known ambitions and necessities of its sister institution has produced a bastard that has the bark of a purebred but the innards and hair of a mongrel."

The PCC was falling apart, leading to the decision to dissolve after the 1958–59 season.

The PCC scandal was one of several problems during the chancellorship of Raymond B. Allen at UCLA that caused him to fall out of favor with the Regents of the University of California. Allen was widely expected to become the next UC President, but instead, in October 1957, UC Berkeley Chancellor Clark Kerr was the Regents' unanimous choice to succeed Sproul.

=== New conference (AAWU) ===
Soon after the PCC was dissolved, five of its nine members (California, Washington, UCLA, Southern California, and Stanford) created the Athletic Association of Western Universities (AAWU) for the 1959 season. While the AAWU did not negotiate an agreement with the Pasadena Tournament of Roses Association to have a standing contractual invitation to the Rose Bowl Game until the following year, the Tournament of Roses did choose to invite the AAWU's inaugural regular season champion to the first post-PCC Rose Bowl.

After initially being blocked from admission, three of the four remaining schools eventually joined (Washington State in 1962, Oregon and Oregon State in 1964), but members were not required to play other members. Tensions were high between UCLA and Stanford, as Stanford had voted for UCLA's expulsion from the PCC.

Idaho was not involved in the scandals but had become noncompetitive in the PCC. Unlike Washington State, Oregon, and Oregon State, Idaho did not pursue AAWU admission, and competed as an independent before becoming a charter member of the Big Sky Conference in 1962. Idaho retains no strong connections to its PCC past other than a continuing rivalry with Washington State; the two land grant campuses are just eight miles (13 km) apart in the Palouse region.

The AAWU eventually strengthened its bonds and added members, renaming itself the Pacific-8 Conference (Pac-8) in 1968. By 1971, most Pac-8 schools played round-robin conference football schedules, and the two Oregon schools were again playing USC and UCLA on a regular basis. The conference added WAC powers Arizona and Arizona State in 1978 and became the Pacific-10 Conference (Pac-10). On July 1, 2011, the conference added Colorado from the Big 12 and Utah from the Mountain West (also a former WAC member) and became the Pac-12. The Pac-12 claims the PCC's history as its own, though it operates under a separate charter.

=== Chronological timeline ===
- 1915 – The Pacific Coast Conference (PCC) . Charter members included the University of California (now the University of California, Berkeley), the University of Oregon, Oregon Agricultural College (now Oregon State University) and the University of Washington, beginning with the 1916–17 academic year.
- 1917 – Washington State College (now Washington State University) joined the PCC in the 1917–18 academic year.
- 1918 – Stanford University joined the PCC in the 1918–19 academic year.
- 1922 – The University of Idaho and the University of Southern California (USC) joined the PCC in the 1922–23 academic year.
- 1924 – The State University of Montana (now the University of Montana) joined the PCC in the 1924–25 academic year.
- 1928 – The University of California at Los Angeles (UCLA) joined the PCC in the 1928–29 academic year.
- 1950 – Montana left the PCC to become an Independent after the 1949–50 academic year.
- 1959 – Idaho, Oregon, Oregon State and Washington State left the PCC to become Independents; thus remained California, Stanford, UCLA, USC and Washington to form the Athletic Association of Western Universities (AAWU; later the Pacific-8 Conference, then the Pacific-10 Conference, and now the Pac-12 Conference); after the 1958–59 academic year.

== Member schools ==
=== Final members ===
Institution	Location	Founded	Type	Enrollment	Nickname	Joined (Note: Represents the calendar year when fall sports competition begins.)	Left (Note: Represents the calendar year when spring sports competition ends.)	Colors	Current conference
University of Idaho	Moscow, Idaho	1889	Public	11,064	Vandals	1922	1959		Big Sky (BSC)
University of Oregon	Eugene, Oregon	1876	Public	23,786	Ducks	1915	1959		Big Ten (B1G)
University of Washington	Seattle, Washington	1861	Public	55,620	Huskies	1915	1959		Big Ten (B1G)
University of Southern California (Note: USC was suspended during 1924.)	Los Angeles, California	1880	Nonsectarian (Note: USC is historically affiliated with the Methodist Church until 1952.)	47,147	Trojans	1922	1959		Big Ten (B1G)
University of California, Los Angeles	Los Angeles, California	1919	Public	46,678	Bruins	1928	1959		Big Ten (B1G)
University of California, Berkeley	Berkeley, California	1868	Public	45,699	Golden Bears	1915	1959		Atlantic Coast (ACC)
Stanford University	Stanford, California	1891	Nonsectarian	18,446	Cardinal	1918	1959		Atlantic Coast (ACC)
Oregon State University	Corvallis, Oregon	1868	Public	35,622	Beavers	1915	1959		Pac-12
Washington State University	Pullman, Washington	1890	Public	26,490	Cougars	1917	1959		Pac-12

=== Other members ===
Institution	Location	Founded	Type	Enrollment	Nickname	Joined (Note: Represents the calendar year when fall sports competition begins.)	Left (Note: Represents the calendar year when spring sports competition ends.)	Colors	Current conference
University of Montana	Missoula, Montana	1893	Public	12,286	Grizzlies	1924	1950		Big Sky (BSC)

=== Membership timeline ===
Full members Independent Other conference 1 Other conference 2

== Conference champions ==
The official record book of conference champions was compiled by the then acting commissioner Bernie Hammerbeck in 1959.

=== Men's basketball ===
The Pacific Coast Conference began playing basketball in the 1915–16 season. The PCC adopted a divisional format for basketball beginning with the 1922–23 season. The California schools formed the Southern Division, while the Pacific Northwest and Rocky Mountain schools formed the North Division. The winners of the two divisions played a best of three series to determine the PCC basketball champion. If two division teams tied, they had a one-game playoff to produce the division representative. Starting with the first NCAA tournament in 1939, the winner of the PCC divisional playoff was given the automatic berth in the NCAA tournament. Oregon, the PCC champion that season, won the first NCAA title game.

The last divisional playoff was in the 1954–55 season. After that, all teams played each other in a round robin competition. From the 1955–56 season through the 1958–59 season, the regular season conference champion was awarded the NCAA tournament berth from the PCC. In the case of a tie, a tie breaker rule was used to determine the NCAA tournament representative.

Season	Conference Champion (#)	Playoff Runner-up
1915–16	California (1); Oregon State (1)	none
1916–17	**Washington State** (1)	none
1918–19	Oregon (1)	none
1919–20	Stanford (1)	none
1920–21	California (2); Stanford (2)	none
1921–22	Idaho (1)	none
1922–23	Idaho (2)	California
1923–24	California (3)	Washington
1924–25	California (4)	Oregon State
1925–26	California (5)	Oregon
1926–27	California (6)	Oregon
1927–28	USC (1)	Washington
1928–29	California (7)	Washington
1929–30	USC (2)	Washington
1930–31	Washington (1)	California
1931–32	California (8)	Washington
1932–33	Oregon State (2)	USC
1933–34	Washington (2)	USC
1934–35	USC (3)	Oregon State
1935–36	Stanford (3)	Washington
1936–37	Stanford (4)	Washington State
1937–38	Stanford (5)	Oregon
1938–39	**Oregon** (2)	California
1939–40	USC (4)	Oregon State
1940–41	Washington State (2)	Stanford
1941–42	**Stanford** (6)	Oregon State
1942–43	Washington (3)	USC
1943–44	California (9); Washington (4)	none
1944–45	Oregon (3); UCLA (1)	none
1945–46	California (10)	Idaho
1946–47	Oregon State (3)	UCLA
1947–48	Washington (5)	California
1948–49	Oregon State (4)	UCLA
1949–50	UCLA (2)	Washington State
1950–51	Washington (6)	UCLA
1951–52	UCLA (3)	Washington
1952–53	Washington (7)	California
1953–54	USC (5)	Oregon State
1954–55	Oregon State (5)	UCLA
1955–56	UCLA (4)	none
1956–57	California (11)	none
1957–58	California (12); Oregon State (6)	none
1958–59	**California** (13)	none

- **Bold** indicates national champion

=== Football ===
The Edgar B. Schwabacher Perpetual Trophy presented to the championship football team of the Pacific Coast Conference.

		Conference			Overall		
Season	Champion(s)	W	L	T	W	L	T
1916	Oregon ^	2	0	1	6	0	1
1916	Washington	3	0	1	6	0	1
1917	Washington State	3	0	0	6	0	0
1918	California	2	0	0	7	2	0
1919	Oregon ^ (2)	2	1	0	5	1	3
1919	Washington (2)	2	1	0	5	1	0
1920	**California** (2)	3	0	0	9	0	0
1921	**California** (3)	4	0	0	9	0	1
1922	**California** (4)	4	0	0	9	0	0
1923	**California** (5)	5	0	0	9	0	1
1924	Stanford ^ (2)	3	0	1	7	1	1
1924	California (6)	2	0	2	8	0	2
1925	Washington (3)	5	0	0	10	1	1
1926	**Stanford** (2)	4	0	0	10	0	1
1927	Stanford ^ (3)	4	0	1	8	2	1
1927	USC	4	0	1	8	1	1
1927	Idaho	2	0	2	4	1	3
1928	**USC** (2)	4	0	1	9	0	1
1929	USC ^ (3)	6	1	0	10	2	0
1929	Stanford (4)	5	1	0	9	2	0
1929	California (7)	4	1	0	7	1	0
1929	Oregon (3)	4	1	0	7	3	0
1930	Washington State (2)	6	0	0	9	1	0
1931	**USC** (4)	7	0	0	10	1	0
1932	**USC** (5)	6	0	0	10	0	0
1933	Oregon (4)	4	1	0	9	1	0
1933	Stanford ^ (5)	4	1	0	8	2	1
1934	Stanford (6)	5	0	0	9	1	1
1935	California (8)	4	1	0	9	1	0
1935	Stanford ^ (7)	4	1	0	8	1	0
1935	UCLA	4	1	0	8	2	0
1936	Washington (4)	7	0	1	7	2	1
1937	**California** (9)	6	0	1	10	0	1
1938	California (10)	6	1	0	10	1	0
1938	USC ^ (6)	6	1	0	9	2	0
1939	**USC** (7)	5	0	2	8	0	2
1940	**Stanford** (8)	7	0	0	10	0	0
1941	Oregon State	7	2	0	8	2	0
1942	UCLA (2)	6	1	0	7	4	0
1943	USC (8)	5	0	0	8	2	0
1944	USC (9)	3	0	2	8	0	2
1945	USC (10)	5	1	0	7	4	0
1946	UCLA (3)	7	0	0	10	1	0
1947	USC (11)	6	0	0	7	2	1
1948	California ^ (11)	6	0	0	10	1	0
1948	Oregon (5)	7	0	0	9	2	0
1949	California (12)	7	0	0	10	1	0
1950	California (13)	5	0	1	9	1	1
1951	Stanford (9)	6	1	0	9	2	0
1952	USC (12)	6	0	0	10	1	0
1953	UCLA (4)	6	1	0	8	2	0
1954	**UCLA** (5)	6	0	0	9	0	0
1955	UCLA (6)	6	0	0	9	2	0
1956	Oregon State (2)	6	1	1	7	3	1
1957	Oregon State (3)	6	2	0	8	2	0
1957	Oregon ^ (6)	6	2	0	7	4	0
1958	California (14)	6	1	0	7	4	0

^ Denotes PCC representative in Rose Bowl for shared conference championships

- **Bold** denotes national champion recognition

=== Baseball ===
The PCC adopted a divisional format for baseball in 1923, with the same alignment that it used for basketball. Briefly, the conference also included the St. Mary's Gaels.

Season	Conference	
1916	CAL	
1917	CAL	
1918	ORE	
1919	WASH	
1920	CAL	
1921	CAL	
1922	WASH	
Season	North	South
1923	WASH	CAL
Season	Conference	
1924	CAL	
Season	North	South
1925	WASH	STAN
1926	WASH	CAL
Season	North	CIBA
1927	WSU	STM
1928	ORE/WSU	STM
1929	WASH	CAL
1930	WASH	USC
1931	WASH	STAN
1932	WASH	USC
1933	WSU	CAL
1934	ORE	CAL
1935	ORE	CAL/USC
1936	WSU	USC
1937	ORE	CAL
1938	OSU/WSU	CAL
1939	ORE	USC/STM
1940	OSU	STM
1941	ORE	CAL/STM
1942	ORE	USC
1943	ORE/OSU	**CAL/USC
1944	WSU	UCLA
1945	WSU	CAL
1946	ORE	USC
1947	WSU	**CAL**/USC
1948	WSU	USC*
1949	WSU	**USC***
1950	WSU*	STAN
1951	OSU	USC*
1952	OSU*	USC
1953	ORE	STAN*
1954	ORE*	USC
1955	ORE	USC*
1956	WSU*	USC
1957	ORE	CAL*/USC
1958	OSU	**USC***
1959	WASH	USC*

*denotes Pacific Coast Conference playoff champion
**California won the CIBA Division 1 and USC won CIBA Division 2. California won the whole division title by beating USC in the CIBA playoff

- **Bold** indicates National Champion

== Commissioners ==
- Herb Dana, 193x–1940
- Edwin N. Atherton, 1940–1944
- Victor O. Schmidt, 1944–1959
- Bernie Hammerbeck (acting), 1959

== See also ==
- List of defunct college football conferences
- California Intercollegiate Baseball Association
