= 2014–15 BYU Cougars men's basketball team =

American college basketball season

2014–15 BYU Cougars men's basketball

NCAA tournament, First Four
- Conference: West Coast Conference
- Record: 25–10 (13–5 WCC)
- Head coach: Dave Rose (10th season)
- Assistant coaches: Terry Nashif (8th season); Tim LaComb (5th season); Mark Pope (4th season)
- Home arena: Marriott Center

2014–15 West Coast Conference men's basketball standings
	Conf.				Overall
Team	W		L	PCT	W		L	PCT
No. 7 Gonzaga †	17	–	1	.944	35	–	3	.921
BYU	13	–	5	.722	25	–	10	.714
Saint Mary's	13	–	5	.722	21	–	10	.677
Pepperdine	10	–	8	.556	18	–	14	.563
San Diego	8	–	10	.444	15	–	16	.484
Portland	7	–	11	.389	17	–	16	.515
Santa Clara	7	–	11	.389	14	–	18	.438
San Francisco	7	–	11	.389	14	–	18	.438
Pacific	4	–	14	.222	12	–	19	.387
Loyola Marymount	4	–	14	.222	8	–	23	.258
† Conference tournament winner Rankings from AP poll

The 2014–15 BYU Cougars men's basketball team represented Brigham Young University in the 2014–15 NCAA Division I men's basketball season. It was head coach Dave Rose's tenth season at BYU and the Cougars fourth season in the West Coast Conference. The Cougars once again played their home games at the Marriott Center. They finished the season 25–10, 13–5 in WCC play to finish in a tie for second place. They advanced to the championship game of the WCC tournament where they lost to Gonzaga. They received an at-large bid to the NCAA tournament where they lost in the First Four to Ole Miss.

== Before the season ==
=== Departures ===
Name	Number	Pos.	Height	Weight	Year	Hometown	Notes
Eric Mika	0	F	6'9"	220	Freshman	Alpine, UT	LDS mission (returning in 2016)
Matt Carlino	2	G	6'2"	175	RS Junior	Scottsdale, AZ	Transferred to Marquette

=== Recruiting ===
BYU has signed five recruits for the 2014-15 season. Two of BYU's recruits will head out on their missions immediately and return for the 2016-17 season. Ryan Andrus, Jake Toolson, and Dalton Nixon will play at least one season before heading out on missions.

College recruiting (2014)
Name	Hometown	School	Height	Weight	Commit date
Payton Dastrup; C	Mesa, Arizona	Mountain View	6 ft 10 in (2.08 m)	230 lb (100 kg)	Nov 13, 2013
Payton Dastrup; C	Recruit ratings: Scout: Rivals: (80)				
Ryan Andrus; F	American Fork, Utah	American Fork	6 ft 8 in (2.03 m)	200 lb (91 kg)	Jul 31, 2013
Ryan Andrus; F	Recruit ratings: Scout: Rivals: (70)				
Jake Toolson; F	Gilbert, Arizona	Highland	6 ft 5 in (1.96 m)	205 lb (93 kg)	Feb 19, 2013
Jake Toolson; F	Recruit ratings: Scout: Rivals: (67)				
Dalton Nixon; F	Orem, Utah	Orem	6 ft 7 in (2.01 m)	190 lb (86 kg)	Aug 12, 2012
Dalton Nixon; F	Recruit ratings: Scout: Rivals: (75)				
T. J. Haws; G	Highland, Utah	Lone Peak	6 ft 3 in (1.91 m)	170 lb (77 kg)	Aug 29, 2011
T. J. Haws; G	Recruit ratings: Scout: Rivals: (86)				
Overall recruit ranking: Scout: 22 Rivals: 17 ESPN: 22
Note: In many cases, Scout, Rivals, 247Sports, On3, and ESPN may conflict in their listings of height and weight.; In these cases, the average was taken. ESPN grades are on a 100-point scale.; Sources: "BYU 2014 Basketball Commitments". Rivals.; "2014 BYU Basketball Commits". Scout.; "ESPN". ESPN.; "Scout.com Team Recruiting Rankings". Scout.; "2014 Team Ranking". Rivals.

=== 2013–14 returned missionaries ===
After returning in the winter and greyshirting, Isaac Neilson will begin his first full season of playing games for the Cougars. Jordan Chatman also returns from his mission and after a summer of working out will be able to play for the Cougars immediately. The Cougars also received surprising news in July. After growing to 6' 10" on his mission, Corban Kaufusi would choose to play basketball instead of football.

College recruiting (2012)
Name	Hometown	School	Height	Weight	Commit date
Jordan Chatman; G	Vancouver, Washington	Union	6 ft 4 in (1.93 m)	190 lb (86 kg)	Sep 6, 2011
Jordan Chatman; G	Recruit ratings: Scout: Rivals: (83)				
Corbin Kaufusi; C	Provo, Utah	Timpview	6 ft 10 in (2.08 m)	240 lb (110 kg)	Jun 24, 2010
Corbin Kaufusi; C	Recruit ratings: Scout: Rivals: (NR)				
Overall recruit ranking: Scout: nr Rivals: nr ESPN: nr
Note: In many cases, Scout, Rivals, 247Sports, On3, and ESPN may conflict in their listings of height and weight.; In these cases, the average was taken. ESPN grades are on a 100-point scale.; Sources: "BYU 2012 Basketball Commitments". Rivals.; "2012 BYU Basketball Commits". Scout.; "ESPN". ESPN.; "Scout.com Team Recruiting Rankings". Scout.; "2012 Team Ranking". Rivals.

=== Transfers ===
BYU introduces three new faces from transfers to the 2013-14 roster. Chase Fischer will be eligible to play immediately after sitting out as a redshirt from Wake Forest all last season. Jamal Aytes will be eligible to start playing for the Cougars after the fall semester ends, near the end of December. Kyle Davis also transferred from Utah State and will redshirt the 2014-15 season.

== 2014–15 media ==
=== Nu Skin Cougar IMG Sports Network ===
KSL 102.7 FM and 1160 AM- Flagship Station (Salt Lake City/ Provo, UT and ksl.com)
BYU Radio- Nationwide (Dish Network 980, Sirius XM 143, and byuradio.org)
KTHK- Blackfoot/ Idaho Falls/ Pocatello/ Rexburg, ID
KMGR- Manti, UT
KSUB- Cedar City, UT
KDXU- St. George, UT

== Roster ==
2014–15 BYU Cougars men's basketball team
Players
Coaches

Pos.	#	Name	Height	Weight	Year	Previous school	Hometown
G	1	Chase Fischer (C)	6 ft 3 in (1.91 m)	195 lb (88 kg)	RS Jr	Ripley; Wake Forest	Ripley, WV
G	2	Jordan Ellis (W)	6 ft 1 in (1.85 m)	185 lb (84 kg)	Jr	North Medford; Portland State	Medford, OR
G	3	Tyler Haws (C)	6 ft 5 in (1.96 m)	200 lb (91 kg)	Sr	Lone Peak	Alpine, UT
G	5	Kyle Collinsworth (C)	6 ft 6 in (1.98 m)	210 lb (95 kg)	Jr	Provo	Provo, UT
F	10	Ryan Andrus	6 ft 8 in (2.03 m)	200 lb (91 kg)	Fr	American Fork	American Fork, UT
F	12	Josh Sharp	6 ft 7 in (2.01 m)	185 lb (84 kg)	RS Sr	Lone Peak; Utah	Highland, UT
G	15	Jake Toolson (W)	6 ft 5 in (1.96 m)	210 lb (95 kg)	Fr	Highland	Gilbert, AZ
G	20	Anson Winder	6 ft 3 in (1.91 m)	195 lb (88 kg)	RS Sr	Bishop Gorman	Las Vegas, NV
F	21	Kyle Davis (W) (redshirt)	6 ft 7 in (2.01 m)	225 lb (102 kg)	Jr	Alta; Southern Utah; Utah State	Draper, UT
G	23	Skyler Halford	6 ft 1 in (1.85 m)	190 lb (86 kg)	Sr	Timpanogos; Salt Lake CC	Orem, UT
G	24	Frank Bartley	6 ft 3 in (1.91 m)	200 lb (91 kg)	So	Future College Prep	Baton Rouge, LA
G	25	Jordan Chatman (redshirt)	6 ft 4 in (1.93 m)	190 lb (86 kg)	Fr	Union	Vancouver, WA
F	30	Dalton Nixon (W)	6 ft 7 in (2.01 m)	190 lb (86 kg)	Fr	Orem	Orem, UT
F/C	33	Nate Austin (injured)	6 ft 11 in (2.11 m)	230 lb (104 kg)	RS Sr	Lone Peak	Alpine, UT
C	35	Isaac Neilson	6 ft 10 in (2.08 m)	230 lb (104 kg)	RS So	Mission Viejo	Mission Viejo, CA
F	40	Jamal Aytes (injured) (redshirt)	6 ft 6 in (1.98 m)	230 lb (104 kg)	Fr	JSerra; UNLV	San Diego, CA
F	41	Luke Worthington	6 ft 9 in (2.06 m)	240 lb (109 kg)	So	Homestead	Mequon, WI
C	44	Corbin Kaufusi (W)	6 ft 10 in (2.08 m)	260 lb (118 kg)	Fr	Timpview	Provo, UT

Head coach

- Dave Rose (Houston)

Assistant coach(es)

- Terry Nashif (BYU)
- Tim LaComb (Utah)
- Mark Pope (Kentucky)
- Noah Hartsock (BYU)

Legend

- (C) Team captain
- (S) Suspended
- (I) Ineligible
- (W) Walk-on
- Injured
- Current redshirt

== Schedule ==
Date time, TV	Rank^{#}	Opponent^{#}	Result	Record	Site city, state
Exhibition
11/01/2014*; 7:00 pm, BYUtv		Colorado School of Mines	W 82–64		Marriott Center; Provo, UT
11/08/2014*; 7:00 pm, BYUtv		Seattle Pacific	W 75–44		Marriott Center; Provo, UT
Non-conference regular season
11/14/2014*; 5:00 pm, BYUtv		Long Beach State	W 95–90	1–0	Marriott Center; Provo, UT
11/18/2014*; 7:30 pm, BYUtv		Arkansas–Little Rock; Maui on the Mainland	W 91–62	2–0	Marriott Center; Provo, UT
11/19/2014*; 7:00 pm, BYUtv		Southern Virginia	W 101–48	3–0	Marriott Center; Provo, UT
11/24/2014*; 9:30 pm, ESPN2		vs. No. 15 San Diego State; 2014 Maui Invitational Tournament	L 87–92 ^{2OT}	3–1	Lahaina Civic Center; Maui, HI
11/25/2014*; 2:30 pm, ESPN2		vs. Chaminade; 2014 Maui Invitational Tournament	W 121–85	4–1	Lahaina Civic Center; Maui, HI
11/26/2014*; 3:00 pm, ESPN2		vs. Purdue; 2014 Maui Invitational Tournament	L 85–87 ^{OT}	4–2	Lahaina Civic Center; Maui, HI
11/29/2014*; 7:30 pm, BYUtv		Eastern Kentucky	W 90–76	5–2	Marriott Center; Provo, UT
12/02/2014*; 7:00 pm, CBSSN		at Utah State; Old Oquirrh Bucket	W 91–81	6–2	Dee Glen Smith Spectrum; Logan, UT
12/06/2014*; 4:00 pm, BYUtv		vs. Hawaii	W 90–70	7–2	Energy Solutions Arena; Salt Lake City, UT
12/10/2014*; 7:00 pm, ESPNU		No. 13 Utah; Old Oquirrh Bucket/Deseret First Duel	L 61–65	7–3	Marriott Center; Provo, UT
12/13/2014*; 7:00 pm, KJZZ		at Weber State; Old Oquirrh Bucket	W 76–60	8–3	Dee Events Center; Ogden, UT
12/20/2014*; 9:00 pm, ESPNU		Stanford	W 79–77	9–3	Marriott Center; Provo, UT
12/23/2014*; 12:00 pm, BYUtv		UMass	W 77–71 ^{OT}	10–3	Marriott Center; Provo, UT
WCC Regular season
12/27/2014; 4:00 pm, ESPN2		No. 8 Gonzaga	L 80–87	10–4 (0–1)	Marriott Center; Provo, UT
12/29/2014; 7:00 pm, BYUtv		Portland	W 97–88	11–4 (1–1)	Marriott Center; Provo, UT
01/01/2015; 3:00 pm, BYUtv		at Santa Clara	W 81–46	12–4 (2–1)	Leavey Center; Santa Clara, CA
01/03/2015; 9:00 pm, ROOT/TheW.tv		at San Francisco	W 99–68	13–4 (3–1)	War Memorial Gymnasium; San Francisco, CA
01/08/2015; 9:00 pm, ESPNU		Pepperdine	L 61–67	13–5 (3–2)	Marriott Center; Provo, UT
01/10/2015; 7:00 pm, BYUtv		Loyola Marymount	W 85–72	14–5 (4–2)	Marriott Center; Provo, UT
01/15/2015; 9:00 pm, ESPNU		at Pacific	W 93–80	15–5 (5–2)	Alex G. Spanos Center; Stockton, CA
01/17/2015; 9:00 pm, ESPN2		at Saint Mary's	L 77–82	15–6 (5–3)	McKeon Pavilion; Moraga, CA
01/24/2015; 2:00 pm, ROOT/TheW.tv		at San Diego	L 74–77	15–7 (5–4)	Jenny Craig Pavilion; San Diego, CA
01/29/2015; 9:00 pm, ESPNU		San Francisco	W 78–74	16–7 (6–4)	Marriott Center; Provo, UT
01/31/2015; 7:00 pm, BYUtv		Santa Clara	W 78–57	17–7 (7–4)	Marriott Center; Provo, UT
02/05/2015; 9:00 pm, ROOT/TheW.tv		at Pepperdine	L 74–80	17–8 (7–5)	Firestone Fieldhouse; Malibu, CA
02/07/2015; 2:00 pm, ROOT/TheW.tv		at Loyola Marymount	W 87–68	18–8 (8–5)	Gersten Pavilion; Los Angeles, CA
02/12/2015; 7:00 pm, ESPN2		Saint Mary's	W 82–58	19–8 (9–5)	Marriott Center; Provo, UT
02/14/2015; 7:00 pm, BYUtv		Pacific	W 84–59	20–8 (10–5)	Marriott Center; Provo, UT
02/19/2015; 8:00 pm, ESPNU		San Diego	W 75–62	21–8 (11–5)	Marriott Center; Provo, UT
02/26/2015; 8:00 pm, ROOT/TheW.tv		at Portland	W 82–69	22–8 (12–5)	Chiles Center; Portland, OR
02/28/2015; 8:00 pm, ESPN2		at No. 3 Gonzaga	W 73–70	23–8 (13–5)	McCarthey Athletic Center; Spokane, WA
WCC tournament
03/07/2015; 9:30 pm, ESPN2	(2)	vs. (7) Santa Clara; Quarterfinals	W 78–76	24–8	Orleans Arena; Paradise, NV
03/09/2015; 9:30 pm, ESPN2	(2)	vs. (6) Portland; Semifinals	W 84–70	25–8	Orleans Arena; Paradise, NV
03/10/2015; 7:00 pm, ESPN	(2)	vs. (1) No. 7 Gonzaga; Championship	L 75–91	25–9	Orleans Arena; Paradise, NV
NCAA tournament
03/17/2015*; 7:00 pm, TruTV	(11 W)	vs. (11 W) Ole Miss; First Four	L 90–94	25–10	UD Arena; Dayton, OH
*Non-conference game. ^{#}Rankings from AP Poll / Coaches' Poll. (#) Tournament seedings in parentheses. W=West Region. All times are in Mountain.

== Game summaries ==
=== Cougar Tipoff ===
Broadcasters: Spencer Linton, Jarom Jordan, & Lauren Francom
Starting Lineups:

- BYU Blue: Tyler Haws, Frank Bartley IV, Anson Winder, Kyle Davis, Luke Worthington (Dalton Nixon, Corbin Kaufusi, Jordan Chatman bench)- 1st Half
  Chase Fischer, Tyler Haws, Josh Sharp, Anson Winder, Skyler Halford (Isaac Neilson, Corbin Kaufusi bench)- 2nd Half
- BYU White: Josh Sharp, Skyler Halford, Issac Neilson, Jake Toolson, Chase Fischer (Jordan Ellis, Ryan Andrus bench)- 1st Half
  Jordan Ellis, Jake Toolson, Kyle Davis, Frank Bartley IV, Luke Worthington (Ryan Andrus, Jordan Chatman, Dalton Nixon bench)- 2nd Half
- Players that sat out: Nate Austin (back), Kyle Collinsworth (precautionary), Jamal Aytes (ankle)

byutv.org

Oct 29
7:05 p.m. MDT

Recap

BYU Blue 83, BYU White 79
Scoring by half: 27-34, 56-45
Pts: Tyler Haws 35; Rebs: Isaac Neilson 7 Asts: Skyler Halford 8	Pts: Kyle Davis 16; Rebs: Ryan Andrus 5 Asts: Skyler Halford 3

Marriott Center
Provo, UT
Attendance: N/A
Referees: DG Nelson, Matt Basham, Courtney Littledike

=== Colorado School of Mines ===
Broadcasters: Dave McCann, Blaine Fowler, & Lauren Francom
Starting Lineups:

- Colorado School of Mines: Trevor Ritchie, Brian Muller, Caleb Waitsman, Gokul Natesan, Joe Dellenbach
- BYU: Chase Fischer, Tyler Haws, Josh Sharp, Anson Winder, Luke Worthington

BYUtv

Nov 1
7:05 p.m. MDT

Recap

Colorado School of Mines Orediggers 64, BYU Cougars 82
Scoring by half: 35-44, 29-38
Pts: Trevor Ritchie 12; Rebs: Caleb Waitsman 9 Asts: Gokul Natesan 4	Pts: Tyler Haws 29; Rebs: Isaac Neilson 10; Asts: Skyler Halford 7

Marriott Center
Provo, UT
Attendance: 12,572
Referees: Ken Ditty, Mark Cook, Justin Shamion

=== Seattle Pacific ===
Broadcasters: Dave McCann, Blaine Fowler, & Spencer Linton
Starting Lineups:

- Seattle Pacific: Riley Stockton, Brendan Carroll, Matt Borton, Garrett Swanson, Cory Hutsen
- BYU: Chase Fischer, Tyler Haws, Kyle Collinsworth, Josh Sharp, Luke Worthington

BYUtv

Nov 8
7:00 p.m. MST

Recap

Seattle Pacific Falcons 44, BYU Cougars 75
Scoring by half: 30-40, 14-35
Pts: Cory Hutsen & Mitch Penner 10; Rebs: Matt Borton & Garrett Swanson 7 Asts: Riley Stockton & Matt Borton 2	Pts: Chase Fischer 21; Rebs: Corbin Kaufusi 8 Asts: Chase Fischer & Kyle Collinsworth 4

Marriott Center
Provo, UT
Attendance: 13,606
Referees: Gregory Nixon, Klaus Endrissat, Jimmy Casas

=== Long Beach State ===
Broadcasters: Dave McCann, Blaine Fowler, & Spencer Linton
Series History: BYU leads series 5-4
Starting Lineups:

- Long Beach State: Mike Caffey, McKay Lasalle, Jack Williams, David Samuels, Branford Jones
- BYU: Chase Fischer, Tyler Haws, Kyle Collinsworth, Nate Austin, Luke Worthington

BYUtv

Nov 14
7:00 p.m. MST

Recap

Long Beach State 49ers 90, BYU Cougars 95
Scoring by half: 47-46, 43-49
Pts: Mike Caffey 26; Rebs: Mike Caffey 5 Asts: Mike Caffey 6	Pts: Tyler Haws 21; Rebs: Nate Austin 9 Asts: Skyler Halford 7

Marriott Center
Provo, UT
Attendance: 16,778
Referees: Brady Chelette, Martin Chchocki, Ryan McCarty

=== Arkansas-Little Rock ===
Broadcasters: Dave McCann, Blaine Fowler, & Spencer Linton
Series History: First Meeting
Starting Lineups:

- Arkansas-Little Rock: Roger Woods, J.T. Thomas, James Reid, Ben Dillard, James White
- BYU: Chase Fischer, Tyler Haws, Kyle Collinsworth, Nate Austin, Luke Worthington

BYUtv

Nov 18
7:30 p.m. MST

Recap

Arkansas-Little Rock Trojans 62, BYU Cougars 91
Scoring by half: 28-37, 34-54
Pts: Roger Woods 19; Rebs: Roger Woods & James White 9 Asts: J.T. Thomas 6	Pts: Chase Fischer 19; Rebs: Nate Austin 11; Asts: Kyle Collinsworth 6

Marriott Center
Provo, UT
Attendance: 12,469
Referees: Michael Irving, Sam Haddad, Kevin Brill

=== Southern Virginia ===
Broadcasters: Dave McCann, Blaine Fowler, & Spencer Linton
Series History: First Meeting
Starting Lineups:

- Southern Virginia: Preston Eaton, Wesley Eavns, Kaleio Manuela, Kevin Walker, Justin Langford
- BYU: Chase Fischer, Tyler Haws, Skyler Halford, Nate Austin, Luke Worthington

BYUtv

Nov 19
7:00 p.m. MST

Recap

Southern Virginia Knights 48, BYU Cougars 101
Scoring by half: 22-49, 26-52
Pts: Preston Eaton 11; Rebs: Preston Eaton & Taylor Larson 5 Asts: Preston Eaton 3	Pts: Jake Toolson 15; Rebs: Jake Toolson & Isaac Neilson 7 Asts: Frank Bartley IV 7

Marriott Center
Provo, UT
Attendance: 13,099
Referees: Glen Mayberry, Nate Harris, Scott Brown

=== Maui Invitational: San Diego State ===
Broadcasters: Sean McDonough & Fran Fraschilla
Series History: BYU leads series 48-23
Starting Lineups:

- San Diego State: Skylar Spencer, Dwayne Poole II, Trey Kell, Winston Shephard, JJ O'Brien
- BYU: Chase Fischer, Tyler Haws, Kyle Collinsworth, Nate Austin, Luke Worthington

ESPN2

Nov 24
6:30 p.m. HST

Recap

San Diego State Aztecs 92, BYU Cougars 87 (OT)
Scoring by half: 41-33, 34-26 Overtime: 9-9, 11-16
Pts: Aqeel Quinn 22; Rebs: Skyler Spencer, JJ O'Brien 9 Asts: JJ O'Brien 6	Pts: Tyler Haws 26; Rebs: Kyle Collinsworth 7 Asts: Kyle Collinsworth 6

Lahaina Civic Center
Maui, HI
Attendance: 2,400
Referees: Randy McCall, Mike Sanzere, Wally Rutecki

=== Maui Invitational: Chaminade ===
Broadcasters: Jon Sciambi & Miles Simon
Series History: BYU leads series 1-0
Starting Lineups:

- Chaminade: Lee Bailey, Kuany Kuany, Kevin Hu, Frankie Eteuati, Kiran Shastri
- BYU: Chase Fischer, Tyler Haws, Kyle Collinsworth, Nate Austin, Luke Worthington

ESPN2

Nov 25
11:30 a.m. HST

Recap

Chaminade Silverswords 85, BYU Cougars 121
Scoring by half: 43-66, 42-55
Pts: Kiran Shastri 16; Rebs: Frankie Eteuati 5 Asts: Lee Bailey, Kuany Kuany 2	Pts: Chase Fischer 30; Rebs: Kyle Collinsworth, Anson Winder 8 Asts: Kyle Collinsworth 6 Fischer new school record for 3's in a game w/ 10. 17 3's made by team new school record.

Lahaina Civic Center
Maui, HI
Attendance: 2,400
Referees: Dick Cartnell, Wally Rutecki, Sean Hull

=== Maui Invitational: Purdue ===
Broadcasters: Jon Sciambi & Miles Simon
Series History: BYU leads series 1-0
Starting Lineups:

- Purdue: Jon Octeus, Vince Edwards, A.J. Hammons, Kendall Stephens, Raphael Davis
- BYU: Chase Fischer, Tyler Haws, Kyle Collinsworth, Nate Austin, Luke Worthington

ESPN2

Nov 26
12:00 p.m. HST

Recap

Purdue Boilermakers 87, BYU Cougars 85 (OT)
Scoring by half: 40-35, 41-46 Overtime: 6-4
Pts: Vince Edwards 25; Rebs: Vince Edwards 9 Asts: Jon Octeus 3	Pts: Tyler Haws 32; Rebs: Nate Austin 6 Asts: Kyle Collinsworth 8

Lahaina Civic Center
Maui, HI
Attendance: 2,400
Referees: Dick Cartnell, Wally Rutecki, Ryan Wells

=== Eastern Kentucky ===
Broadcasters: Dave McCann, Blaine Fowler, & Lauren Francom
Series History: BYU leads series 2-1
Starting Lineups:

- Eastern Kentucky: Corey Walden, Isaac McGlone, Timmy Knipp, Ja'Mill Powell, Eric Stutz
- BYU: Chase Fischer, Tyler Haws, Kyle Collinsworth, Nate Austin, Isaac Neilson

BYUtv

Nov 29
7:35 p.m. MST

Recap

Eastern Kentucky Colonels 76, BYU Cougars 90
Scoring by half: 30-32, 46-58
Pts: Ja'Mill Powell 26; Rebs: Timmy Knipp 5 Asts: Corey Walden 7	Pts: Tyler Haws 26; Rebs: Anson Winder 5 Asts: Kyle Collinsworth 5

Marriott Center
Provo, UT
Attendance: 16,770
Referees: Richard Batsell, Marc Beasley, Casey McClellan

=== Utah State ===
Broadcasters: Rich Waltz & Pete Gillen
Series History: BYU leads series 138-92
Starting Lineups:

- BYU: Chase Fischer, Tyler Haws, Kyle Collinsworth, Nate Austin, Luke Worthington
- Utah State: Darius Perkins, David Collette, Jalen Moore, Jojo McGlaston, Chris Smith

CBSSN

Dec 2
7:00 p.m. MST

Recap

BYU Cougars 91, Utah State Aggies 81
Scoring by half: 31-32, 60-49
Pts: Tyler Haws 35; Rebs: Kyle Collinsworth 10; Asts: Kyle Collinsworth 4 BYU 34-39 (87.2%) FT	Pts: Chris Smith 25; Rebs: Jalen Moore 11; Asts: Chris Smith 4 USU -10 offensive rebounds

Dee Glen Smith Spectrum
Logan, UT
Attendance: 10,270
Referees: Mike Reid, Daron White, Brett Nansel

=== Hawaii ===
Broadcasters: Dave McCann, Blaine Fowler, & Spencer Linton
Series History: BYU leads series 32-13
Starting Lineups:

- Hawaii: Garrett Nevels, Roderick Bobbitt, Quincy Smith, Aaron Valdes, Mike Thomas
- BYU: Chase Fischer, Tyler Haws, Kyle Collinsworth, Nate Austin, Luke Worthington

BYUtv

Dec 6
4:05 p.m. MST

Recap

Hawaii Rainbow Warriors 70, BYU Cougars 90
Scoring by half: 30-37, 40-53
Pts: Aaron Valdes 24; Rebs: Aaron Valdes 7 Asts: Roderick Bobbitt 7	Pts: Tyler Haws 30; Rebs: Kyle Collinsworth 12; Asts: Kyle Collinsworth 10; Collinsworth triple-double #1

Energy Solutions Arena
Salt Lake City, UT
Attendance: 13,623
Referees: Frank Harvey, Nate Harris, Scott Brown

=== Utah ===
Broadcasters: Roxy Bernstein & Miles Simon
Series History: BYU leads series 129-126
Starting Lineups:

- Utah: Brandon Taylor, Chris Reyes, Kenneth Ogbe, Jakob Poeltl, Delon Wright
- BYU: Chase Fischer, Tyler Haws, Kyle Collinsworth, Nate Austin, Luke Worthington

ESPNU

Dec 10
7:05 p.m. MST

Recap

Utah Utes 65, BYU Cougars 61
Scoring by half: 30-31, 35-30
Pts: Delon Wright 16; Rebs: Delon Wright 11; Asts: Delon Wright 3	Pts: Tyler Haws 23; Rebs: Kyle Collinsworth 9 Asts: Kyle Collinsworth 5

Marriott Center
Provo, UT
Attendance: 20,951
Referees: Michael Reed, Michael Irving, Rick Batsell

=== Weber State ===
Broadcasters: Steve Klauke, Phil Johnson, & Tony Parks
Series History: BYU leads series 29-10
Starting Lineups:

- BYU: Chase Fischer, Tyler Haws, Kyle Collinsworth, Isaac Neilson, Luke Worthington
- Weber State: Joel Bolomboy, Richaud Gittens, Jeremy Senglin, Kyndahl Hill, James Hajek

KJZZ

Dec 13
7:05 p.m. MST

Recap

BYU Cougars 76, Weber State Wildcats 60
Scoring by half: 39-25, 27-25
Pts: Tyler Haws 19; Rebs: Tyler Haws 7 Asts: Tyler Haws 5	Pts: Jeremy Senglin 16; Rebs: Joel Bolomboy 7 Asts: Jeremy Senglin 5

Dee Events Center
Ogden, UT
Attendance: 10,122
Referees: Brett Nansel, Wilson Holland, Michael Rapp

=== Stanford ===
Broadcasters: Rich Cellini & Miles Simon
Series History: BYU leads series 5-2
Starting Lineups:

- Stanford: Stefan Nastic, Chasson Randle, Dorian Pickens, Anthony Brown, Reid Travis
- BYU: Chase Fischer, Tyler Haws, Kyle Collinsworth, Isaac Neilson, Luke Worthington

ESPNU

Dec 20
9:05 p.m. MST

Recap

Stanford Cardinal 77, BYU Cougars 79
Scoring by half: 35-36, 42-43
Pts: Chasson Randle 24; Rebs: Stefan Nastic 9 Asts: Chasson Randle 5	Pts: Tyler Haws 24; Rebs: Kyle Collinsworth 10; Asts: Kyle Collinsworth 7

Marriott Center
Provo, UT
Attendance: 13,247
Referees: Michael Irving, Gregory Nixon, Tom Nally

=== UMass ===
Broadcasters: Dave McCann & Blaine Fowler
Series History: UMass leads series 1-0
Starting Lineups:

- UMass: Maxie Esho, Derrick Gordon, Jabarie Hinds, Trey Davis, Cady Lalanne
- BYU: Chase Fischer, Tyler Haws, Kyle Collinsworth, Isaac Neilson, Luke Worthington

BYUtv

Dec 23
12:05 p.m. MST

Recap

UMass Minutemen 71, BYU Cougars 77 (OT)
Scoring by half: 30-32, 32-30 Overtime: 9-15
Pts: Maxie Esho 16; Rebs: Cady LaLanne 10; Asts: Jabarie Hinds 4	Pts: Anson Winder 25; Rebs: Kyle Collinsworth 15; Asts: Kyle Collinsworth 4

Marriott Center
Provo, UT
Attendance: 15,789
Referees: Frank Harvey, Glen Mayberry, Klaus Endrissat

=== Gonzaga ===
Broadcasters: Dave Flemming & Stan Heath
Series History: Gonzaga leads series 7-3
Starting Lineups:

- Gonzaga: Kevin Pangos, Gary Bell Jr., Byron Wesley, Przemek Karnowski, Kyle Wiltjer
- BYU: Chase Fischer, Tyler Haws, Kyle Collinsworth, Isaac Neilson, Luke Worthington

ESPN2

Dec 27
4:05 p.m. MST

Recap

Gonzaga Bulldogs 87, BYU Cougars 80
Scoring by half: 43-43, 44-37
Pts: Kyle Wiltjer 24; Rebs: Byron Wesley & Przemek Karnowski 10; Asts: Kevin Pangos 7	Pts: Tyler Haws & Anson Winder 17; Rebs: Kyle Collinsworth 10; Asts: Kyle Collinsworth 10; Collinsworth triple-double #2

Marriott Center
Provo, UT
Attendance: 20,900
Referees: Michael Greenstein, Tommy Nunez, Deldre Carr

=== Portland ===
Broadcasters: Dave McCann, Blaine Fowler, & Spencer Linton
Series History: BYU leads series 10-1
Starting Lineups:

- Portland: Bryce Pressley, Alec Wintering, Thomas Van Der Mars, Riley Barker, Volodymyr Gerun
- BYU: Chase Fischer, Tyler Haws, Kyle Collinsworth, Anson Winder, Luke Worthington

BYUtv

Dec 29
7:05 p.m. MST

Recap

Portland Pilots 88, BYU Cougars 97
Scoring by half: 37-43, 51-54
Pts: Alec Wintering 30; Rebs: Riley Barker 8 Asts: Jason Todd 7	Pts: Tyler Haws 24; Rebs: Kyle Collinsworth 8 Asts: Tyler Haws & Skyler Halford 6

Marriott Center
Provo, UT
Attendance: 17,452
Referees: Michael Irving, Richard Batsell, Brett Nansel

=== Santa Clara ===
Broadcasters: Dave McCann & Blaine Fowler
Series History: BYU leads series 21-5
Starting Lineups:

- BYU: Chase Fischer, Tyler Haws, Kyle Collinsworth, Anson Winder, Luke Worthington
- Santa Clara: Brandon Clark, Denzel Johnson, Matt Hubbard, Jared Brownridge, Nate Kratch

BYUtv

Jan 1
2:00 p.m. PST

Recap

BYU Cougars 81, Santa Clara Broncos 46
Scoring by half: 41-22, 40-24
Pts: Chase Fischer & Tyler Haws 14; Rebs: Kyle Collinsworth 15; Asts: Kyle Collinsworth 6	Pts: Brandon Clark 12; Rebs: Jalen Richard, Jared Brownridge, & Nate Kratch 4 Asts: Jared Brownridge 6

Leavey Center
Santa Clara, CA
Attendance: 2,375
Referees: Deidre Carr, Ken Ditty, Daryl Gelinas

=== San Francisco ===
Broadcasters: Glen Kuiper & Dan Belluomini
Series History: BYU leads series 11-7
Starting Lineups:

- BYU: Chase Fischer, Tyler Haws, Kyle Collinsworth, Anson Winder, Luke Worthington
- USF: Matt Glover, Kruize Pinkins, Devin Watson, Mark Tollefsen, Tim Derksen

ROOT

Jan 3
8:00 p.m. PST

Recap

BYU Cougars 99, San Francisco Dons 68
Scoring by half: 57-29, 42-39
Pts: Tyler Haws 22; Rebs: Kyle Collinsworth 12; Asts: Kyle Collinsworth 10; Collinsworth triple-double #3	Pts: Kruize Pinkins 15; Rebs: Tim Derksen 6 Asts: Devin Watson 4

War Memorial Gymnasium
San Francisco, CA
Attendance: 2,585
Referees: Frank Harvey, Sam Haddad, Horace Shields

=== Pepperdine ===
Broadcasters: John Brickley & Mo Cassara
Series History: BYU leads series 9-5
Starting Lineups:

- Pepperdine: Jeremy Major, Atif Russell, Shawn Olden, A.J. John, Jett Raines
- BYU: Chase Fischer, Tyler Haws, Kyle Collinsworth, Anson Winder, Luke Worthington

ESPNU

Jan 8
9:05 p.m. MST

Recap

Pepperdine Waves 67, BYU Cougars 61
Scoring by half: 39-29, 28-32
Pts: Stacy Davis 23; Rebs: Stacy Davis 8 Asts: Amadi Udenyi 6	Pts: Tyler Haws 26; Rebs: Tyler Haws 6 Asts: Anson Winder 5

Marriott Center
Provo, UT
Attendance: 15,852
Referees: Ken Ditty, Ronald Brokenbrough, Donald McAllister

=== Loyola Marymount ===
Broadcasters: Dave McCann, Jarom Jordan, & Spencer Linton
Series History: BYU leads series 6-4
Starting Lineups:

- LMU: Godwin Okonji, Chase Flint, Ayodeji Egbeyemi, Marin Mornar, David Humphries
- BYU: Chase Fischer, Tyler Haws, Kyle Collinsworth, Anson Winder, Luke Worthington

BYUtv

Jan 10
7:05 p.m.

Recap

Loyola Marymount Lions 72, BYU Cougars 85
Scoring by half: 36-47, 36-38
Pts: Marin Mornar 16; Rebs: Marin Mornar 8 Asts: Chase Flint 8	Pts: Tyler Haws 26; Rebs: Kyle Collinsworth 10; Asts: Kyle Collinsworth 8

Marriott Center
Provo, UT
Attendance: 16,912
Referees: Tom Spitznagel, LaDonte King, Tim Mario

=== Pacific ===
Broadcasters: Roxy Bernstein & Corey Williams
Series History: Series even 4-4
Starting Lineups:

- BYU: Chase Fischer, Tyler Haws, Kyle Collinsworth, Skyler Halford, Luke Worthington
- Pacific: TJ Wallace, Eric Thompson, Ray Bowles, David Taylor, Sami Eleraky

ESPNU

Jan 15
8:08 p.m. PST

Recap

BYU Cougars 93, Pacific Tigers 80
Scoring by half: 43-34, 50-46
Pts: Tyler Haws 26; Rebs: Kyle Collinsworth 11; Asts: Kyle Collinsworth 11; Collinsworth ties NCAA record w/ fourth triple-double of the season	Pts: TJ Wallace 18; Rebs: Eric Thompson 6 Asts: Dulani Robinson 4

Alex G. Spanos Center
Stockton, CA
Attendance: 3,626
Referees: Tommy Nunez, Glen Mayberry, Wilson Holland

=== Saint Mary's ===
Broadcasters: Beth Mowins & Stan Heath
Series History: BYU leads series 10-6
Starting Lineups:

- BYU: Chase Fischer, Tyler Haws, Kyle Collinsworth, Skyler Halford, Luke Worthington
- SMC: Brad Waldow, Kerry Carter, Aaron Bright, Garrett Jackson, Desmond Simmons

ESPN2

Jan 17
8:00 p.m. PST

Recap

BYU Cougars 77, Saint Mary's Gaels 82
Scoring by half: 37-45, 40-37
Pts: Tyler Haws 28; Rebs: Tyler Haws & Kyle Collinsworth 6 Asts: Tyler Haws & Kyle Collinsworth 3	Pts: Brad Waldow 24; Rebs: Brad Waldow 14; Asts: Emmett Naar 7

McKeon Pavilion
Moraga, CA
Attendance: 3,500
Referees: Klaus Endrissat, Horace Shields, Jimmy Casas

=== San Diego ===
Broadcasters: Barry Tompkins & Casey Jacobsen
Series History: BYU leads series 8-2
Starting Lineups:

- BYU: Chase Fischer, Tyler Haws, Kyle Collinsworth, Anson Winder, Luke Worthington
- USD: Chris Anderson, Johnny Dee, Duda Sanadze, Simi Fajemisin, Brett Bailey

ROOT

Jan 24
1:00 p.m. PST

Recap

BYU Cougars 74, San Diego Toreros 77
Scoring by half: 38-33, 36-44
Pts: Tyler Haws 20; Rebs: Kyle Collinsworth 9 Asts: Skyler Halford 4	Pts: Thomas Jacobs 19; Rebs: Thomas Jacobs 13; Asts: Chris Anderson 7

Jenny Craig Pavilion
San Diego, CA
Attendance: 2,463
Referees: Glen Mayberry, Dennis Flannery, Scott Harris

=== San Francisco ===
Broadcasters: Roxy Bernstein & Corey Williams
Series History: BYU leads series 12-7
Starting Lineups:

- USF: Matt Glover, Kruize Pinkins, Devin Watson, Marl Tollefsen, Tim Derksen
- BYU: Chase Fischer, Tyler Haws, Kyle Collinsworth, Anson Winder, Corbin Kaufusi

ESPNU

Jan 29
9:05 p.m. MST

Recap

San Francisco Dons 74, BYU Cougars 78
Scoring by half: 30-34, 44-44
Pts: Mark Tollefsen 22; Rebs: Matt Glover 10; Asts: Matt Glover 7	Pts: Tyler Haws 28; Rebs: Kyle Collinsworth 6 Asts: Kyle Collinsworth 6

Marriott Center
Provo, UT
Attendance: 12,452
Referees: Michael Greenstein, Coban Lopez, LaDonte King

=== Santa Clara ===
Broadcasters: Spencer Linton, Blaine Fowler, & Lauren Francom
Series History: BYU leads series 22-5
Starting Lineups:

- Santa Clara: Brandon Clark, Denzel Johnson, Matt Hubbard, Jared Brownridge, Nate Kratch
- BYU: Tyler Haws, Anson Winder, Skyler Halford, Dalton Nixon, Corbin Kaufusi

BYUtv

Jan 31
7:05 p.m. MST

Recap

Santa Clara Broncos 57, BYU Cougars 78
Scoring by half: 29-35, 28-43
Pts: Jared Brownridge 16; Rebs: Emmanuel Ndumanya 6 Asts: Denzel Johnson, Matt Hubbard, Jared Brownridge 3	Pts: Tyler Haws 21; Rebs: Isaac Neilson 9 Asts: Skyler Halford 7

Marriott Center
Provo, UT
Attendance: 17,771
Referees: Dennis Flannery, Nate Harris, Sam Haddad

=== Pepperdine ===
Broadcasters: Steve Quis, Dan Dickau, & Kelli Tennant
Series History: BYU leads series 9-6
Starting Lineups:

- BYU: Tyler Haws, Kyle Collinsworth, Anson Winder, Dalton Nixon, Corbin Kaufusi
- Pepperdine: Amadi Udenyi, Stacy Davis, A.J. Lapray, Shawn Olden, Jett Raines

ROOT

Feb 5
8:03 p.m. PST

Recap

BYU Cougars 74, Pepperdine Waves 80
Scoring by half: 38-25, 36-55
Pts: Tyler Haws 22; Rebs: Kyle Collinsworth 10; Asts: Skyler Halford 3	Pts: Stacy Davis 22; Rebs: Stacy Davis & Lamond Murray Jr. 7 Asts: Amadi Udenyi 9

Firestone Fieldhouse
Malibu, CA
Attendance: 2,630
Referees: Ken Ditty, Ronald Brokenbrough, Donald McAllister

=== Loyola Marymount ===
Broadcasters: Barry Tompkins & Casey Jacobsen
Series History: BYU leads series 7-4
Starting Lineups:

- BYU: Chase Fischer, Tyler Haws, Kyle Collinsworth, Josh Sharp, Corbin Kaufusi
- LMU: Matt Hayes, Godwin Okonji, Chase Flint, Marin Mornar, David Humphries

ROOT

Feb 7
1 p.m. PST

Recap

BYU Cougars 87, Loyola Marymount Lions 68
Scoring by half: 40-30, 47-38
Pts: Kyle Collinsworth 23; Rebs: Kyle Collinsworth 12; Asts: Kyle Collinsworth 10; Kyle Collinsworth 5th triple double this season new NCAA record for triple doubles in a season	Pts: Marni Mornar 17; Rebs: David Humphries 9 Asts: Evan Payne & David Humphires 4

Gersten Pavilion
Los Angeles, CA
Attendance: 3,232
Referees: Klaus Endrissat, Rob Rorke, Matt Cook

=== Saint Mary's ===
Broadcasters: Trey Bender & Stan Heath
Series History: BYU leads series 10-7
Starting Lineups:

- SMC: Brad Waldow, Kerry Carter, Garrett Jackson, Desmond Simmons, Emmett Naar
- BYU: Chase Fischer, Tyler Haws, Kyle Collinsworth, Josh Sharp, Corbin Kaufusi

ESPN2

Feb 12
7:05 p.m. MST

Recap

Saint Mary's Gaels 58, BYU Cougars 82
Scoring by half: 30-42, 28-40
Pts: Brad Waldow 17; Rebs: Dane Pineau 8 Asts: Brad Wadlow 3	Pts: Kyle Collinsworth & Skyler Halford 17; Rebs: Kyle Collinsworth 9 Asts: Josh Sharp & Skyler Halford 5

Marriott Center
Provo, UT
Attendance: 14,317
Referees: Michael Reed, Michael Irving, Tommy Nunez

=== Pacific ===
Broadcasters: Dave McCann, Blaine Fowler, & Spencer Linton
Series History: BYU leads series 5-4
Starting Lineups:

- Pacific: T.J. Wallace, Gabriel Aguirre, Eric Thompson, Ray Bowles, David Taylor
- BYU: Chase Fischer, Tyler Haws, Kyle Collinsworth, Josh Sharp, Corbin Kaufusi

BYUtv

Feb 14
7:05 p.m. MST

Recap

Pacific Tigers 59, BYU Cougars 84
Scoring by half: 30-33, 29-51
Pts: Gabriel Aguirre 14; Rebs: Gabriel Aguirre 6 Asts: Dulani Robinson 5	Pts: Tyler Haws 20; Rebs: Kyle Collinsworth 12; Asts: Kyle Collinsworth 9

Marriott Center
Provo, UT
Attendance: 16,202
Referees: Michael Greenstein, Klaus Endrissat, Daryl Gelinas

=== San Diego ===
Broadcasters: Roxy Bernstein & Corey Williams
Series History: BYU leads series 8-3
Starting Lineups:

- USD: Chris Anderson, Johnny Dee, Brandon Perry, Duda Sanadze, Jito Kok
- BYU: Chase Fischer, Tyler Haws, Kyle Collinsworth, Josh Sharp, Corbin Kaufusi

ESPNU

Feb 19
8:05 p.m. MST

Recap

San Diego Toreros 62, BYU Cougars 75
Scoring by half: 28-33, 34-42
Pts: Johnny Dee 13; Rebs: Chris Anderson, Johnny Dee, & Duda Sanadze 4 Asts: Chris Anderson 9	Pts: Tyler Haws 28; Rebs: Kyle Collinsworth 11; Asts: Kyle Collinsworth 4

Marriott Center
Provo, UT
Attendance: 17,092
Referees: Richard Batsell, Tom Spitznagel, Jimmy Casas

=== Portland ===
Broadcasters: Tom Glasgow & Jack Sikma
Series History: BYU leads series 11-1
Starting Lineups:

- BYU: Chase Fischer, Tyler Haws, Kyle Collinsworth, Josh Sharp, Corbin Kaufusi
- Portland: Kevin Bailey, Bryce Pressley, Alec Wintering, Thomas Van Der Mars, Volodymyr Gerun

ROOT/TheW.tv

Feb 26
7 p.m. PST

Recap

BYU Cougars 82, Portland Pilots 69
Scoring by half: 33-41, 49-28
Pts: Tyler Haws 21; Rebs: Tyler Haws 7 Asts: Kyle Collinsworth 11; Haws becomes BYU's all-time scoring leader.	Pts: Kevin Bailey 18; Rebs: Thomas Van Der Mars 13; Asts: Alec Wintering 7

Chiles Center
Portland, OR
Attendance: 3,433
Referees: Greg Nixon, Klaus Endrissat, Ken Ditty

=== Gonzaga ===
Broadcasters: Beth Mowins & Stan Heath
Series History: Gonzaga leads series 8-3
Starting Lineups:

- BYU: Chase Fischer, Tyler Haws, Kyle Collinsworth, Josh Sharp, Corbin Kaufusi
- Gonzaga: Kevin Pangos, Gary Bell Jr., Byron Wesley, Prezemek Karnowski, Kyle Wiltjer

ESPN2

Feb 28
7 p.m. PST

BYU Cougars 73, Gonzaga Bulldogs 70
Scoring by half: 36-36, 37-34
Pts: Kyle Collinsworth 20; Rebs: Kyle Collinsworth 8 Asts: Kyle Collinsworth 3 Corbin Kaufusi 3 blocks	Pts: Byron Wesley 17; Rebs: Byron Wesley 9 Asts: Kevin Pangos 5 Prezemek Karnowski 3 blocks

McCarthey Athletic Center
Spokane, WA
Attendance: 6,000
Referees: Michael Reed, Frank Harvey, Glen Mayberry

=== Quarterfinal: Santa Clara ===
Broadcasters: Beth Mowins & Stan Heath
Series History: BYU leads 23-5
Starting Lineups:

- Santa Clara: Brandon Clark, Jarvis Pugh, Denzel Johnson, Jared Brownridge, Nate Kratch
- BYU: Chase Fischer, Tyler Haws, Kyle Collinsworth, Josh Sharp, Corbin Kaufusi

ESPN2

Mar 7
8:30 pm PST

Recap

Santa Clara Broncos 76, BYU Cougars 78
Scoring by half: 36-36, 40-42
Pts: Jared Brownridge 29; Rebs: Nate Kratch 7 Asts: Brandon Clark 7	Pts: Tyler Haws 30; Rebs: Tyler Haws 9 Asts: Kyle Collinsworth & Frank Bartley IV 3

Orleans Arena
Paradise, NV
Attendance: 8,537
Referees: Deldre Carr, Marc Beasley, Kurt Walker

=== Semifinal: Portland ===
Broadcasters: Beth Mowins, Stan Heath, & Jeff Goodman
Series History: BYU leads 12-1
Starting Lineups:

- Portland: Kevin Bailey, Bryce Pressley, Alec Wintering, Jason Todd, Thomas Van Der Mars
- BYU: Chase Fischer, Tyler Haws, Kyle Collinsworth, Josh Sharp, Corbin Kaufusi

ESPN2

Mar 9
8:30 pm PDT

Portland Pilots 70, BYU Cougars 84
Scoring by half: 24-42, 46-42
Pts: Thomas Van Der Mars 16; Rebs: Thomas Van Der Mars 9 Asts: Bobby Sharp 3	Pts: Chase Fischer 24; Rebs: Kyle Collinsworth 14; Asts: Kyle Collinsworth 11; Collinsworth 6th triple double Ties NCAA career mark

Orleans Arena
Paradise, NV
Attendance: 8,546

=== Championship: Gonzaga ===
Broadcasters: Dave Pasch, Sean Farnham, & Jeff Goodman (ESPN)
Kevin Calabro & P.J. Carlesimo (Westwood One)
Series History: Gonzaga leads series 8-4
Starting Lineups:

- BYU: Chase Fischer, Tyler Haws, Kyle Collinsworth, Josh Sharp, Corbin Kaufusi
- Gonzaga: Kevin Pangos, Gary Bell Jr., Byron Wesley, Prezemek Karnowski, Kyle Wiltjer

ESPN

Mar 10
6:00 pm PDT

BYU Cougars 75, Gonzaga Bulldogs 91
Scoring by half: 42-48, 33-43
Pts: Kyle Collinsworth 28; Rebs: Corbin Kaufusi 9 Asts: Kyle Collinsworth 5	Pts: Kyle Wiltjer 18; Rebs: Kyle Wiltjer 10; Asts: Kevin Pangos 5

Orleans Arena
Paradise, NV
Attendance: 8,585
Referees: Tommy Nunez, Mike Greenstein, Michael Irving

=== First Four: Ole Miss ===
Broadcasters: Brian Anderson, Steve Smith, & Lewis Johnson (TruTV)
Brandon Gaudin & Alaa Abdelnaby (Westwood One)
Series History: First Meeting
Starting Lineups:

- BYU: Chase Fischer, Tyler Haws, Kyle Collinsworth, Josh Sharp, Corbin Kaufusi
- Ole Miss: M.J. Rhett, Sebastian Saiz, Martavious Newby, Jarvis Summers, Stefan Moody

TruTV

Mar 17
9:30 pm EDT

Recap

BYU Cougars 90, Ole Miss Rebels 94
Scoring by half: 49-32, 41-62
Pts: Tyler Haws 33; Rebs: Kyle Collinsworth 7 Asts: Kyle Collinsworth 10	Pts: Stefan Moody 26; Rebs: Sebastian Saiz & Martavious Newby 9 Asts: Jarvis Summers 10

University of Dayton Arena
Dayton, OH
Attendance: 12,124
Referees: Ray Natili, Brian O'Connell, Paul Faia (Jeff Clark)
