= Utah Mr. Basketball =

High school basketball award

Each year, the Utah Mr. Basketball Award is given to the person chosen as the best high school boys basketball player in the U.S. state of Utah, in the United States. Class 5A was introduced in 1994. Class 6A was introduced in 2018.

The award has been given since 1987 by the Deseret News. Winners are chosen by the Utah Associated Press Sportscasters and Sportswriters Association (UAPSSA).

Utah Mr. Basketball award winners
Year	Utah Mr. Basketball	High school	Class	College	NBA
2026	Gavin Lowe	Olympus	5A	UC Irvine	
2025	Gavin Lowe	Olympus	5A	UC Irvine	
2024	Cooper Lewis	Lehi	6A	Saint Mary's	
2023	Quentin Meza	Cyprus	6A	Wofford/Idaho State/Hawaii Pacific	
2022	Collin Chandler	Farmington	6A	Kentucky/BYU	
2021	Ethan Potter	Layton	6A	Utah Valley/Utah Tech	
2020	Dallin Hall	Fremont	6A	BYU/Virginia	
2019	Rylan Jones	Olympus	5A	Utah/Utah State/Samford	
2018	Rylan Jones	Olympus	5A	Utah/Utah State/Samford	
2017	Jaxon Brenchley	Ridgeline	3A	Utah	
2016	Frank Jackson	Lone Peak	5A	Duke	2017 2nd Round
2015	Jesse Wade	Davis	5A	Gonzaga/BYU	
2014	T. J. Haws	Lone Peak	5A	BYU	
2013	Nick Emery	Lone Peak	5A	BYU	
2012	Jordan Loveridge	West Jordan	5A	Utah	
2011	Tyrell Corbin	West	5A	UC Davis/SLCC/CSU Bakersfield	
2010	Kyle Collinsworth	Provo	4A	BYU	
2009	Tyler Haws	Lone Peak	5A	BYU	
2008	Tyler Haws	Lone Peak	5A	BYU	
2007	Morgan Grim	Riverton	5A	Utah/Utah State	
2006	Daniel Deane	Judge Memorial	3A	Utah/Oregon St.	
2005	Jackson Emery	Lone Peak	5A	BYU	
2004	Tai Wesley	Provo	4A	Utah State	
2003	Josh Olson	Alta	5A	Utah	
2002	Brody Van Brocklin	Davis	5A	Weber State	
2001	Jared Jensen	Fremont	5A	BYU	
2000	Garner Meads	Brighton	5A	BYU	
1999	Tim Henry	Mountain View	5A	SLCC	
1998	Tony Brown	Mountain Crest	4A	Utah State	
1997	Britton Johnsen	Murray	4A	Utah	Various NBA teams
1996	Jeff Johnsen	Murray	4A	Utah	
1995	Jeff Johnsen	Murray	4A	Utah	
1994	Alex Jensen	Viewmont	5A	Utah	
1993	Ben Melmeth	Judge Memorial	3A	Utah	
1992	JaRon Boone	Skyline	4A	Nebraska	
1991	Justin Weidauer	Cottonwood	3A	BYU	
1990	Kenneth Roberts	Bingham	4A	BYU	
1989	Shawn Bradley	Emery High School	2A	BYU	1993 1st Round
1988	Matt Bowman	Timpview	3A	Utah Valley	
1987	Kurt Miller	Ben Lomond	3A	New Mexico	

== Schools with multiple winners ==
Schools with multiple winners
School	Number of awards	Years
Lone Peak	6	2005, 2008, 2009, 2013, 2014, 2016
Olympus	4	2018, 2019, 2025, 2026
Murray	3	1995, 1996, 1997
Judge Memorial	2	1993, 2006
Provo	2	2004, 2010
Davis	2	2002, 2015
Fremont	2	2001, 2020
