= Frank Jackson (basketball) =

American basketball player (born 1998)

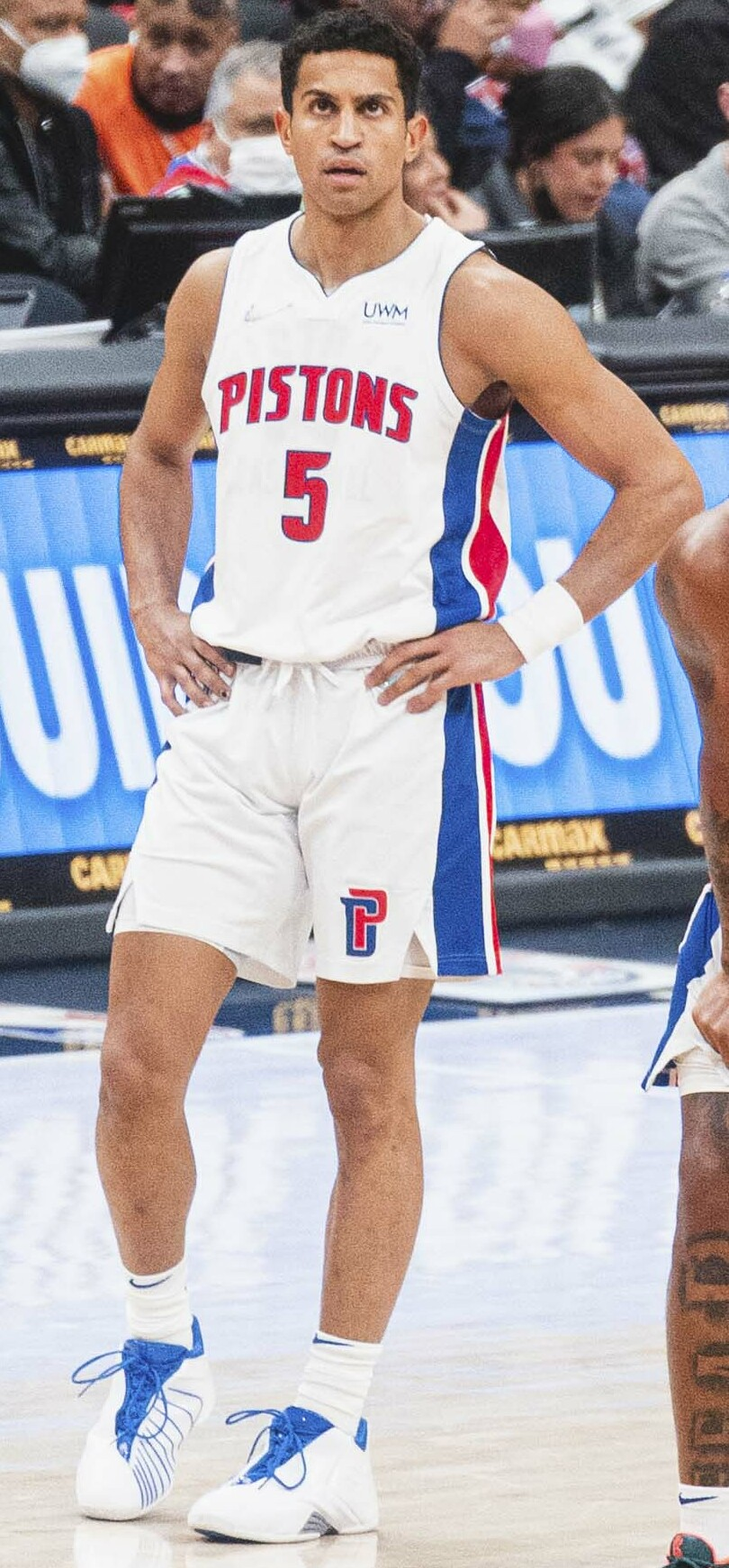
- Jackson with the Detroit Pistons in 2022

No. 5 – Ningbo Rockets
- Position: Shooting guard
- League: CBA

Personal information
- Born: May 4, 1998 (age 27) Washington, D.C., U.S.
- Listed height: 6 ft 3 in (1.91 m)
- Listed weight: 205 lb (93 kg)

Career information
- High school: Lehi (Lehi, Utah); Lone Peak (Highland, Utah)
- College: Duke (2016–2017)
- NBA draft: 2017: 2nd round, 31st overall pick
- Drafted by: Charlotte Hornets
- Playing career: 2017–present

Career history
- 2017–2020: New Orleans Pelicans
- 2018–2019: →Texas Legends
- 2020–2022: Detroit Pistons
- 2022–2023: Salt Lake City Stars
- 2023: Utah Jazz
- 2023: LDLC ASVEL
- 2023–2024: Shanxi Loongs
- 2024: Nanterre 92
- 2024–2025: Jiangsu Dragons
- 2025–present: Ningbo Rockets

Career highlights
- NBA G League Next Up Game (2023); McDonald's All-American Co-MVP (2016); Utah Mr. Basketball (2016)
- Stats at NBA.com
- Stats at Basketball Reference

Franklin Willis Jackson (born May 4, 1998) is an American professional basketball player for the Ningbo Rockets of the Chinese Basketball Association (CBA). He previously played college basketball for the Duke Blue Devils.

== High school career ==
=== Freshman and sophomore seasons ===
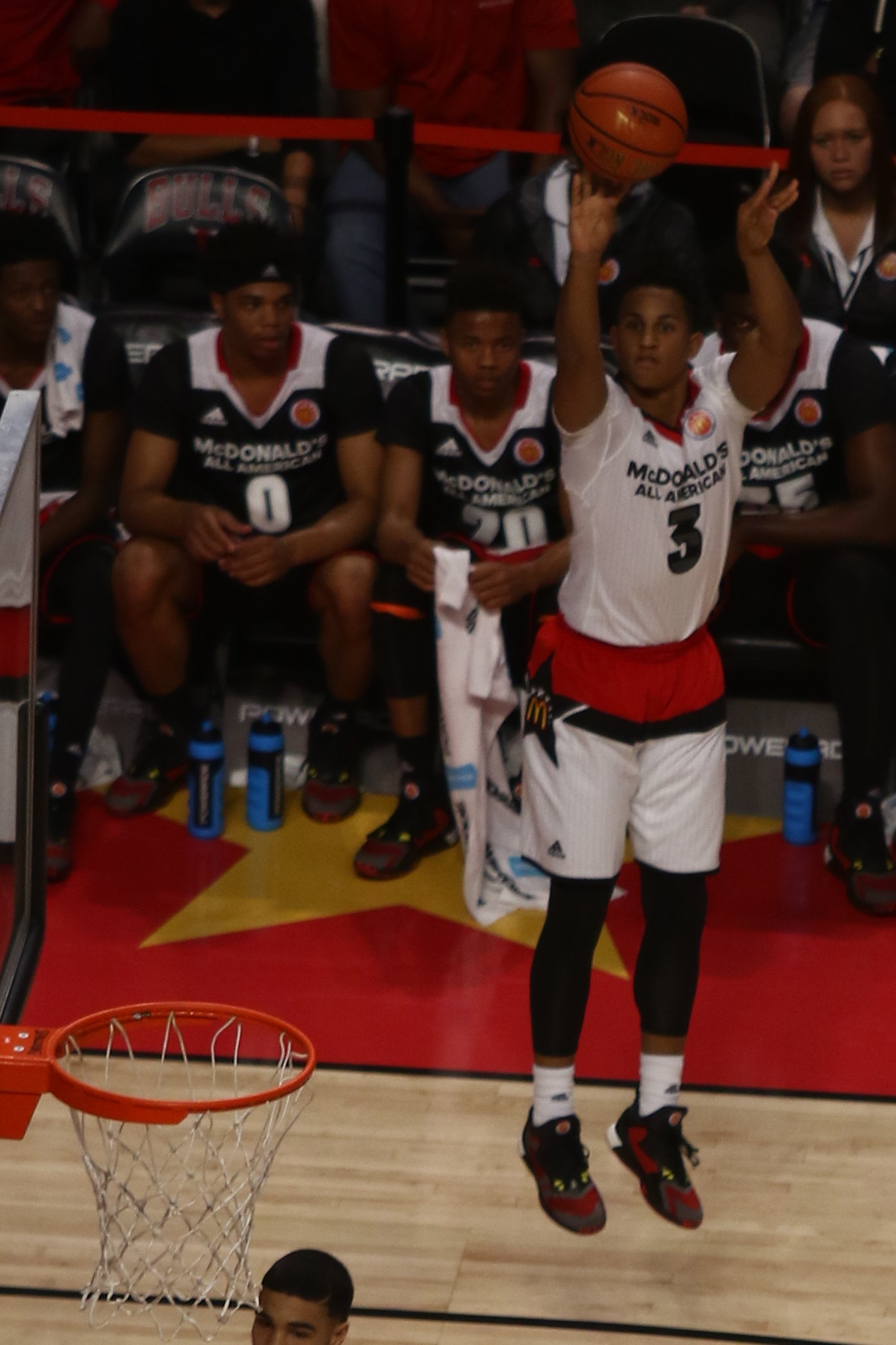
Jackson in the 2016 McDonald's All-American Game

Franklin attended Lehi High School in Lehi, Utah as a freshman before transferring to Lone Peak High School in Highland, Utah as a sophomore. As a sophomore in 2014, Jackson averaged 17.9 points a game and helped his team, along with 4-star future BYU recruit T.J. Haws, win the Utah 5A state championship.

=== Junior season ===
As a junior, he averaged 26.9 points per game, 4.5 rebounds per game, and 2.0 steals earning Fourth-team Maxpreps All-American, Salt Lake Tribune All-state honors and First Team All USA Utah selection. During the 2015 summer, Jackson participated in the NBPA Top 100 Camp in Virginia. In August 2015, Jackson then was invited play in the Under Armour Elite 24 in New York City where he performed extremely well and out-shined the competition, scoring 20 points earning Co-MVP honors, including recording an in-game, 360-degree fastbreak dunk that was much-talked about and replayed throughout the televised broadcast. More highlights of his junior season include a 54-point outing on December 18, 2014, against Clark County (Nev.) in the Jerry Tarkanian Classic setting a Lone Peak Record in points. Jackson averaged 24 points and 2.7 assists in 10 games on the Adidas Uprising Gauntlet circuit with his AAU team, the Utah Prospects. His AAU coach called Jackson "more skilled at this age than what Russell Westbrook was."

=== Senior season ===
On December 12, Jackson scored 38 points in a 73–71 win against Alterique Gilbert and Miller Grove. On January 12, 2016, Jackson scored 49 points and 9 rebounds in a 94–92 overtime loss against Kobi Simmons and St. Francis School at the 2016 HoopHall Classic. On February 5, Jackson scored 32 points and 11 rebounds in a 68–61 win over St. Joseph. As a senior, he averaged 28.1 points per game, 6.4 rebounds per game, and 3.0 assist per game while being named Utah Mr. Basketball, Salt Lake Tribune player of the year. Jackson was named a McDonald's All-American in January 2016, and competed in both the Powerade Jam Fest, where he won the Slam Dunk Competition, and in the all-star game on March 30, 2016, at the United Center in Chicago, IL, scoring 19 points en route to earning Co-MVP honors alongside teammate Josh Jackson (no relation), who also had 19 for the victorious West team In April, Jackson was selected to play at the 2016 Jordan Brand Classic.

Jackson was rated as a five-star recruit and considered a top-ten prospect in the 2016 class. He was ranked as the No. 10 overall recruit by ESPN, as well as the No.12 recruit by Scout.com in the 2016 high school class.

=== Recruiting ===
Jackson was recruited by Duke, Arizona, Arizona State, BYU, Maryland, Stanford, UCLA, and Utah. He originally committed to BYU as a freshman but backed out after receiving interest from other schools. On September 1, 2015, Jackson committed to Duke University.

College recruiting information
Name	Hometown	School	Height	Weight	Commit date
Frank Jackson; PG	Alpine, UT	Lone Peak High School	6 ft 4 in (1.93 m)	200 lb (91 kg)	Sep 1, 2015
Frank Jackson; PG	Recruit ratings: Scout: Rivals: 247Sports: ESPN: (96)				
Overall recruit ranking: Scout: 13 Rivals: 12 ESPN: 10
Note: In many cases, Scout, Rivals, 247Sports, On3, and ESPN may conflict in their listings of height and weight.; In these cases, the average was taken. ESPN grades are on a 100-point scale.; Sources: "2016 Duke Basketball Commitment List". Rivals.; "2016 Team Ranking". Rivals.

== College career ==
On November 11, in his Duke debut, Jackson scored 18 points and 4 assist in a 94–49 win against Marist at the 2016 Hall of Fame Tip Off. On November 12, Jackson put up 22 points and 4 rebounds in a 96–61 victory over Grand Canyon. On November 14, 2016, Jackson earned Atlantic Coast Conference (ACC) freshman of the week honors. On November 19, Jackson scored 17 points in a 78–68 win over Penn State. On November 23, the Blue Devils defeated William & Mary 88–67 behind Jackson's 19 points. On January 4, he scored 15 points and 4 assist in a 110–57 blowout win against Georgia Tech. On February 28, Jackson scored a season-high 22 points while shooting 3–4 from deep range in a 75–70 victory over Florida State. On March 8, Jackson tallied 20 points while shooting 7–10 from the field in a 79–72 win against Clemson. On March 10, Jackson scored 15 points and grabbed 5 rebounds in a 93–83 win over rival North Carolina in the semi-finals of the ACC tournament. On March 11, Duke would go on to defeat Notre Dame 75–69 in the ACC Tournament championship game. In his only season at Duke, Jackson started 16 of 36 games and averaged 10.9 points, 2.5 rebounds, 1.7 assists and shot 40 percent from behind the arc and 54 percent on 2-point shots.

On May 12, 2017, he announced that he was signing with an agent, forgoing his three remaining collegiate seasons.

== Professional career ==
=== New Orleans Pelicans (2017–2020) ===
On June 22, 2017, Jackson was drafted 31st overall by the Charlotte Hornets but was quickly traded to the New Orleans Pelicans for cash considerations. On July 11, 2017, Jackson signed with the Pelicans. After the draft he underwent foot surgery and was ruled out until January but, in January, Jackson underwent a second surgery on his foot and was ruled out for the remainder of the season.

Jackson made his summer league debut on July 6, 2018, where he recorded 13 points, 6 rebounds, 1 assist and 1 steal. Early in the second half he suffered a left ankle sprain and was ruled for out the rest of the Tournament. Jackson made his NBA debut on October 17, 2018, in the Pelicans' season opener against the Houston Rockets recording 2 minutes off the bench. The Pelicans went on to win 131–112.

On January 7, 2019, Jackson tallied a then career-high 17 points and drained three three-pointers against the Memphis Grizzlies in only 19 minutes off the bench. The Pelicans came out victorious in that game winning 114–95. On February 2, Jackson topped his previous career-high with 25 points on 10–20 shooting in a 113–108 loss to the San Antonio Spurs.

On November 1, 2019, Jackson scored 21 points in a 122–107 win against the Denver Nuggets. On November 14, Jackson tallied 23 points and two assists in a 132–127 victory over the Los Angeles Clippers.

=== Detroit Pistons (2020–2022) ===
On December 4, 2020, Jackson signed a contract with the Oklahoma City Thunder. On December 21, Jackson was waived by the Thunder.

On December 27, Jackson signed a two-way contract with the Detroit Pistons.

Jackson signed a two-year extension with the Pistons in August 2021. On June 29, 2022, the Pistons declined their team option on Jackson, making him a free agent.

On September 20, 2022, Jackson signed a non-guaranteed deal with the Phoenix Suns. He was later waived by the Suns on October 11, after appearing in two preseason games.

=== Salt Lake City Stars / Utah Jazz (2022–2023) ===
On October 23, 2022, Jackson joined the Salt Lake City Stars training camp roster. He was named to the G League's inaugural Next Up Game for the 2022–23 season.

On February 22, 2023, Jackson signed a 10-day contract with the Utah Jazz.

On March 4, 2023, Jackson was reacquired by the Salt Lake City Stars.

=== LDLC ASVEL (2023) ===
On July 7, 2023, Jackson signed with LDLC ASVEL of the French LNB Pro A and the EuroLeague.

On November 15, 2023, ASVEL announced that the club was parting ways with Jackson. In six EuroLeague appearances with ASVEL, Jackson averaged 10.3 points (75% 2FG, 32% 3FG), 1.8 rebounds, and 1.3 assists.

=== Shanxi Loongs (2023–2024) ===
On November 29, 2023, Jackson signed with Shanxi Loongs of the Chinese Basketball Association (CBA). In February 2024, he left the team.

=== Nanterre 92 (2024) ===
On June 18, 2024, he signed with Nanterre 92 of the LNB Pro A.

=== Jiangsu Dragons (2024–2025) ===
On November 23, 2024, Jackson signed with Jiangsu Dragons of the Chinese Basketball Association (CBA).

=== Ningbo Rockets (2025–present) ===
On August 29, 2025, Jackson signed with the Ningbo Rockets of the Chinese Basketball Association.

== Career statistics ==
Legend
GP	Games played	GS	Games started	MPG	Minutes per game
FG%	Field-goal percentage	3P%	3-point field-goal percentage	FT%	Free-throw percentage
RPG	Rebounds per game	APG	Assists per game	SPG	Steals per game
BPG	Blocks per game	PPG	Points per game	PIR	Performance index rating
**Bold**	Career high

=== NBA ===
==== Regular season ====
Year	Team	GP	GS	MPG	FG%	3P%	FT%	RPG	APG	SPG	BPG	PPG
2018–19	New Orleans	**61**	**16**	19.2	.434	.314	.740	**2.2**	**1.1**	.4	.0	8.1
2019–20	New Orleans	59	2	13.5	.405	.326	.747	1.4	1.0	.3	.1	6.3
2020–21	Detroit	40	6	18.5	**.457**	**.407**	.813	**2.2**	.9	.4	.0	9.8
2021–22	Detroit	53	7	**22.0**	.402	.308	**.827**	1.6	1.0	**.5**	**.2**	**10.6**
2022–23	Utah	1	0	5.1	.000	.000	–	2.0	1.0	.0	.0	.0
Career		214	31	18.1	.421	.332	.786	1.8	1.0	.4	.1	8.5

=== EuroLeague ===
Year	Team	GP	GS	MPG	FG%	3P%	FT%	RPG	APG	SPG	BPG	PPG	PIR
2023–24	ASVEL	6	4	20.2	.511	.320	.727	1.8	1.3	.5	—	10.3	7.0
Career		6	4	20.2	.511	.320	.727	1.8	1.3	.5	—	10.3	7.0

=== College ===
Year	Team	GP	GS	MPG	FG%	3P%	FT%	RPG	APG	SPG	BPG	PPG
2016–17	Duke	36	16	24.9	.473	.395	.755	2.5	1.7	0.6	0.1	10.9

== Personal life ==
Jackson is the son of former Utah state senator Al Jackson, and the second-oldest of five children. Jackson is a Republican. A member of the Church of Jesus Christ of Latter-day Saints, he has lived in Oregon and the Maryland suburbs, where his father worked as a lobbyist for the aerospace industry. He currently resides in Sundance, Utah.
