= John Henry Daley =

American football player

No. 90 – Michigan Wolverines
- Position: Defensive end
- Class: Senior

Personal information
- Listed height: 6 ft 5 in (1.96 m)
- Listed weight: 252 lb (114 kg)

Career information
- High school: Lone Peak (Highland, Utah)
- College: BYU (2023); Utah (2024–2025); Michigan (2026–present)

Awards and highlights
- First-team All-American (2025); First-team All-Big 12 (2025)
- Stats at ESPN

John Henry Daley is an American college football defensive end for the Michigan Wolverines. He previously played for the BYU Cougars and Utah Utes.

== Early life ==
Daley was born the son of Neal and Julie Daley and attended Lone Peak High School in Highland, Utah. As a senior, he had 82 tackles and a state-leading 22 sacks. He committed to Brigham Young University (BYU) to play college football.

== College career ==
After two years on a Mormon mission, Daley joined BYU in 2023 and played in three games recording three tackles. After the season, he transferred to the University of Utah. In his first year at Utah in 2024, he played in seven games and had four tackles and a sack. Daley returned to Utah in 2025 and was a first-team All-American, finishing the season with 48 tackles and 11.5 sacks.

In January 2026, Daley transferred to the University of Michigan, following head coach Kyle Whittingham from Utah. On September 14, following his second game at Michigan, Daley earned Big Ten Defensive Player of the Week honors following his eight tackle, three TFL and one sack performance in the win against No. 11 Oklahoma.

== Personal life ==
Daley is nicknamed the "Vanilla Gorilla". His father, Neal, his brother, Michael, and his uncles, Craig Bills, David Nixon and Taysom Hill, played college football at BYU. Daley and his brother operate the Daley Foundation, which is a nonprofit organization that provides extracurricular opportunities for children with special needs.
