= TJ Haws =

American basketball player (born 1995)

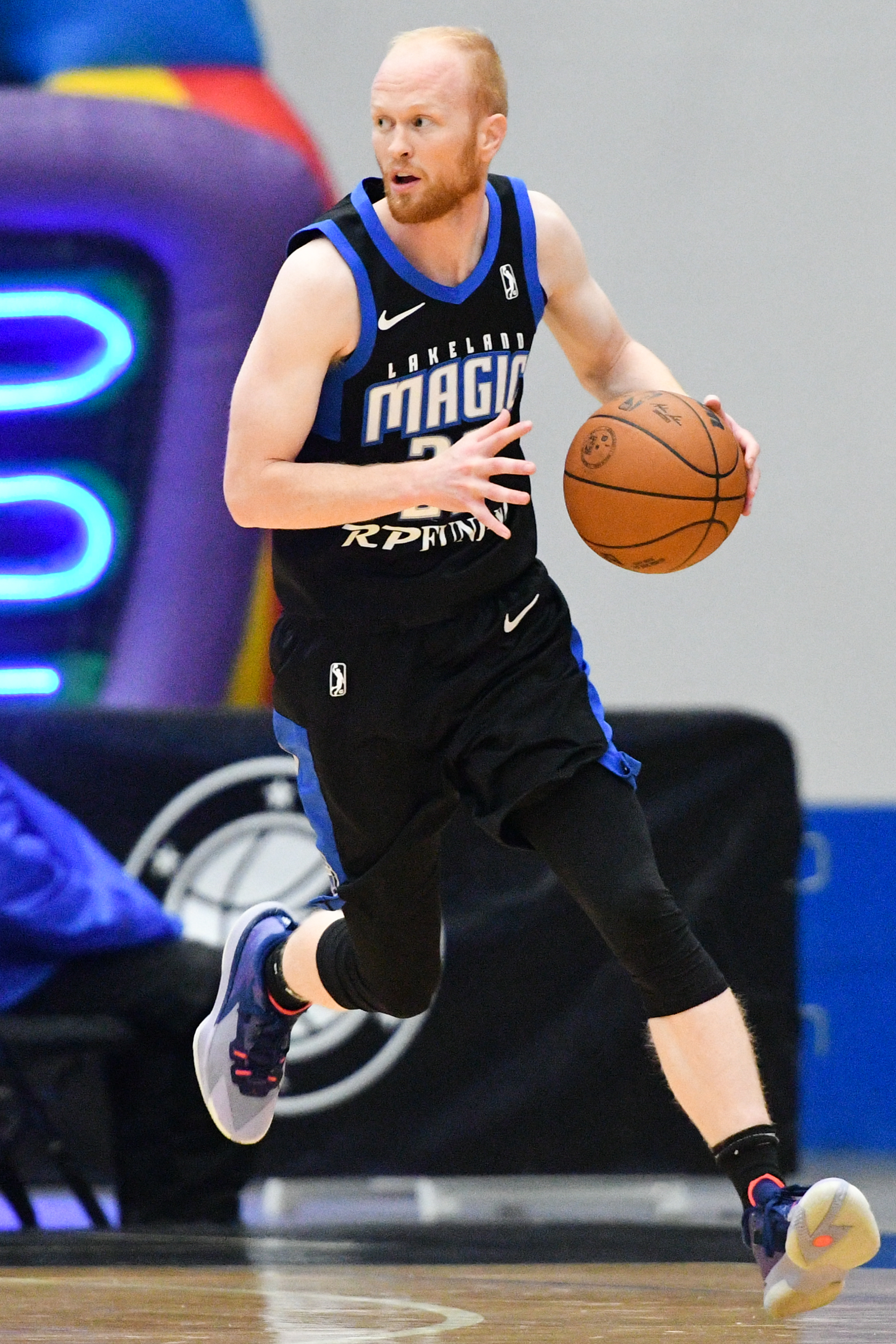
- Haws in 2021

Personal information
- Born: August 3, 1995 (age 31)
- Listed height: 6 ft 4 in (1.93 m)
- Listed weight: 170 lb (77 kg)

Career information
- High school: Lone Peak (Highland, Utah)
- College: BYU (2016–2020)
- NBA draft: 2020: undrafted
- Playing career: 2020–2022
- Position: Shooting guard

Career history
- 2020–2021: Trefl Sopot
- 2021–2022: Lakeland Magic

Career highlights
- 2× First-team All-WCC (2017, 2020); Second-team All-WCC (2019); WCC All-Freshman Team (2017); Utah Mr. Basketball (2014)

Tyson Jay Haws (born August 3, 1995) is an American professional basketball player who last played for the Lakeland Magic of the NBA G League. He played college basketball for the BYU Cougars.

== High school career ==
Haws was a four-year starter at Lone Peak High School in Highland, Utah, and the team won Utah's 5A state championship in each of his seasons. He was also a four-time All-State selection. As a junior, he averaged 17.1 points per game and led his team to the mythical national championship. The trio of Haws, Eric Mika, and Nick Emery were nicknamed the "Lone Peak Three." In his senior season, he averaged 25.2 points and 5.2 assists per game and was named Utah Mr. Basketball and Utah Gatorade Player of the Year. A four-star recruit, Haws committed to play college basketball at BYU before his sophomore season in high school.

== College career ==
After high school, Haws embarked on a two-year mission for the Church of Jesus Christ of Latter-day Saints in France. Following his return, Haws averaged 13.8 points, 3.2 assists, 2.9 rebounds and 1.0 steals per game as a freshman at BYU, earning First Team All-West Coast Conference (WCC) honors. As a sophomore, Haws averaged 11.7 points and 4.2 assists per game.

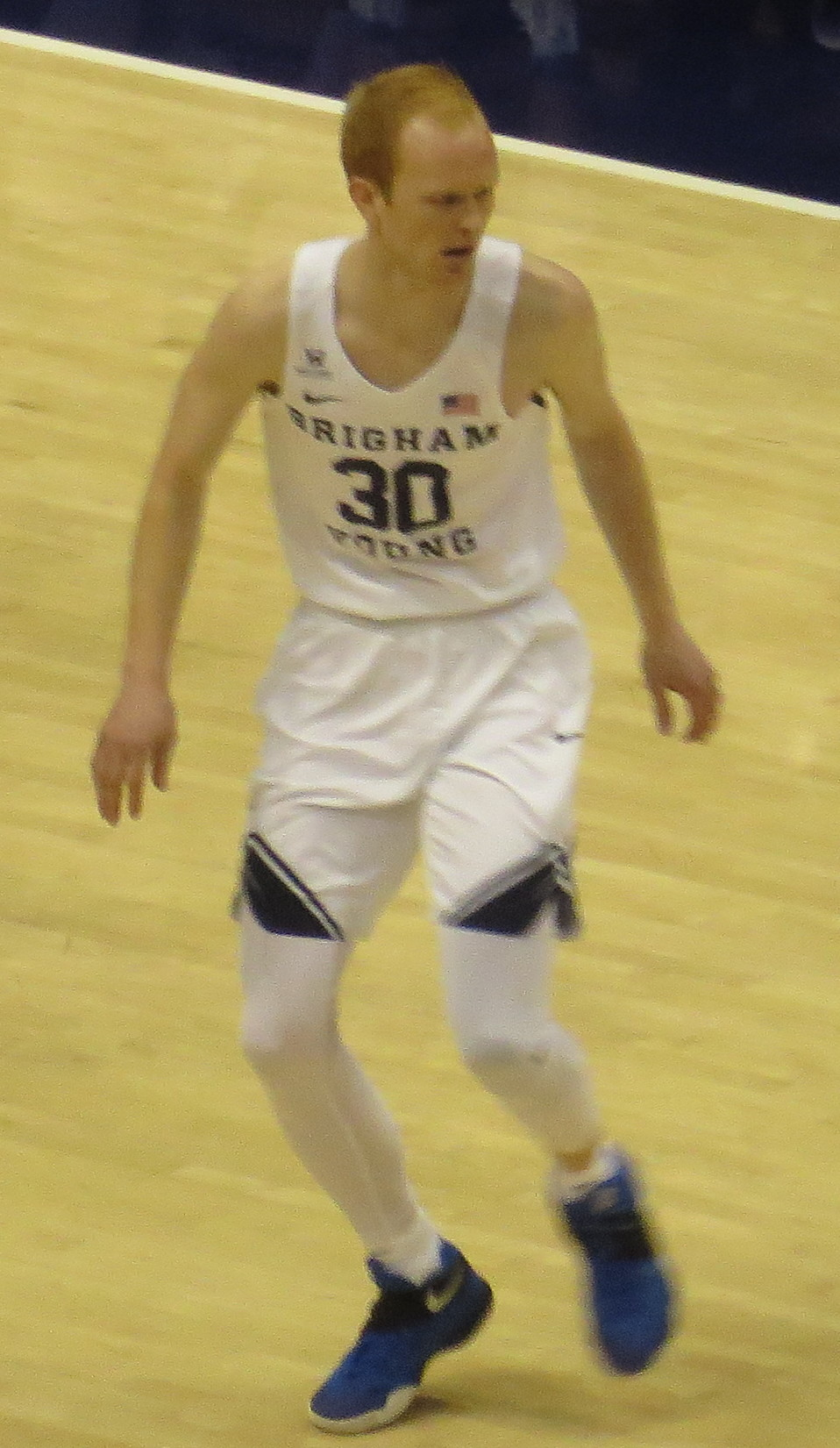
Haws with BYU in January 2017

On February 15, 2019, he scored a career-high 35 points in an 88–82 overtime victory over San Diego. Haws averaged 17.8 points and a team-high 5.1 assists and 1.2 steals per game as a junior. He earned Second Team All-WCC honors. On January 11, 2020, Haws posted a career-high 14 assists against Portland. He had his second double-double on February 15, recording 17 points and 10 assists in a 72–71 win against San Diego. As a senior, Haws averaged 14.0 points and 5.7 assists per game, shooting 45.9% from the field. He was named to the First Team All-WCC. He finished his career ranked second in BYU history in assists with 603.

== Professional career ==
On July 22, 2020, Haws signed with Trefl Sopot of the Polish Basketball League. He was selected with the 15th pick in the 2021 NBA G League draft by the Lakeland Magic.

== Career statistics ==
Legend
| GP | Games played | GS | Games started | MPG | Minutes per game |
| FG% | Field goal percentage | 3P% | 3-point field goal percentage | FT% | Free throw percentage |
| RPG | Rebounds per game | APG | Assists per game | SPG | Steals per game |
| BPG | Blocks per game | PPG | Points per game | **Bold** | Career high |

=== College ===
| Year | Team | GP | GS | MPG | FG% | 3P% | FT% | RPG | APG | SPG | BPG | PPG |
|---|---|---|---|---|---|---|---|---|---|---|---|---|
| 2016–17 | BYU | 34 | 34 | 30.6 | .424 | **.404** | .787 | 2.9 | 3.2 | 1.0 | .1 | 13.8 |
| 2017–18 | BYU | **35** | **35** | **33.7** | .410 | .309 | .837 | 2.7 | 4.2 | 1.2 | **.3** | 11.7 |
| 2018–19 | BYU | 32 | 32 | 33.4 | **.463** | .352 | **.868** | **3.5** | 5.1 | 1.2 | **.3** | **17.8** |
| 2019–20 | BYU | 32 | 32 | 32.5 | .459 | .371 | .762 | 2.5 | **5.7** | **1.3** | .2 | 14.0 |
| Career | | 133 | 133 | 32.5 | .440 | .361 | .824 | 2.9 | 4.5 | 1.2 | .2 | 14.3 |

== Personal life ==
Haws and his wife, Lauren, have a son named Tyson, who was born in February 2020. Haws has an older brother, Tyler, who also played basketball at BYU and finished as its all-time leading scorer, and now plays at the professional level. His father, Marty, was also a standout basketball player at BYU from 1986 to 1990.
