= Jordan Loveridge =

American basketball player (born 1993)

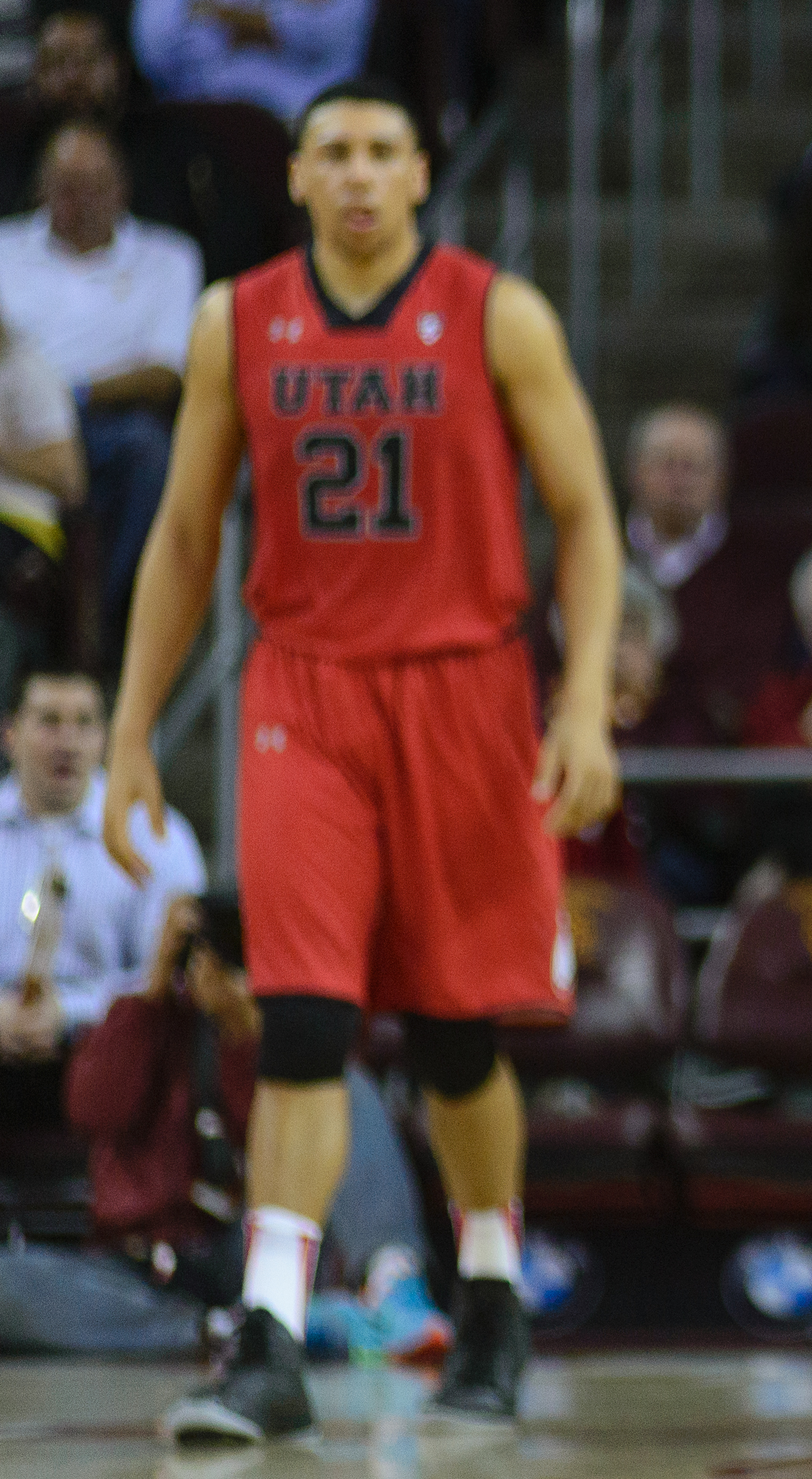
- Loveridge playing for Utah in 2014

No. 21 – Instituto
- Position: Small forward
- League: LNB

Personal information
- Born: November 26, 1993 (age 32) West Jordan, Utah, U.S.
- Listed height: 6 ft 6 in (1.98 m)
- Listed weight: 230 lb (104 kg)

Career information
- High school: West Jordan (West Jordan, Utah)
- College: Utah (2012–2016)
- NBA draft: 2016: undrafted
- Playing career: 2016–present

Career history
- 2016–2017: BC Körmend
- 2017: BBC Lausanne
- 2017–2018: BG Göttingen
- 2018–2019: KKK MOSiR Krosno
- 2019–2020: Swans Gmunden
- 2020–2022: Kobrat
- 2022–2024: Astros de Jalisco
- 2025: Dorados de Chihuahua
- 2025: El Calor de Cancún
- 2025: Fuerza Regia de Monterrey
- 2026: Instituto Atlético Central Córdoba

Career highlights
- LNBP All-Star (2022); 2× CIBACOPA champion (2022, 2023); CIBACOPA MVP (2022); 2× CIBACOPA All-Star (2022, 2023); CIBACOPA All-Star Game MVP (2022); First-team Parade All-American (2012); Utah Mr. Basketball (2012)

Jordan Loveridge (born November 26, 1993) is an American professional basketball player for Instituto Atlético Central Córdoba of the Liga Nacional de Básquetbol (LNB). He played college basketball for the Utah Utes.

== High school career ==
Loveridge attended West Jordan High School where he was coached by Scott Briggs. He appeared in several games as a freshman and averaged 13.0 points per game as a sophomore. As a junior, Loveridge posted 23.5 points per game. He led West Jordan to the state finals but was told by Utah head coach Jim Boylen he was not good enough to play for them. Loveridge was named Utah Mr. Basketball in 2012. As a senior, he led the Jaguars to a 21–3 record by averaging 22.9 points and 13.1 rebounds per game. Loveridge committed to Utah in September 2011 after new coach Larry Krystkowiak recruited him.

== College career ==
Loveridge had an instant impact as a freshman, averaging 12 points and seven rebounds per game, but was left off the All-Pac-12 All-Freshman Team. He earned Utah's first-ever Pac-12 player of the week nod on December 8, 2013, after a 27-point, seven rebound performance against Idaho State and 21 points and five assists in the 81–64 win over rival BYU. As a sophomore, he averaged 14.7 points per game.

In December 2014, it was announced that Loveridge would miss significant time due to recovery from knee surgery. His scoring production fell to 10 points per game as a junior, but the team made the Sweet 16 of the NCAA Tournament. He averaged 11.6 points and 3.8 rebounds per game as a senior at Utah. Loveridge finished his college career with 1,568 points, the 13th highest mark in Utah history.

== Professional career ==
Loveridge worked out with a few NBA teams, including the Utah Jazz. In August 2016 he signed with BC Körmend of the Hungarian league. "In a different time of system, I'll be able to show I can do more things," he said. He averaged 10.5 points, 4.9 rebounds, 1.9 assists and 1.1 steals per game for Kormend. After the season Loveridge inked with BBC Lausanne of the Swiss League. Loveridge joined the German club BG Göttingen in 2017. He signed with Krosno of the Polish Basketball League on August 3, 2018. In September 2019, Loveridge signed with Swans Gmunden of the Austrian Basketball Superliga. He averaged 17.8 points and seven rebounds per game. On June 25, 2020, Loveridge signed with Kobrat in the Finnish league.

Loveridge helped Mexican team Astros de Jalisco win the 2022 CIBACOPA title and was named league MVP. He was also named the All-Star Game MVP after recording 47 points. Later that year, Loveridge was named a Liga Nacional de Baloncesto Profesional (LNBP) All-Star, with the team playing in both leagues. He returned to the Astros for the 2023 season, repeating as an All-Star.

In January 2026, Loveridge signed with Instituto Atlético Central Córdoba of the Liga Nacional de Básquetbol.
