= Tyler Haws =

American basketball player (born 1991)

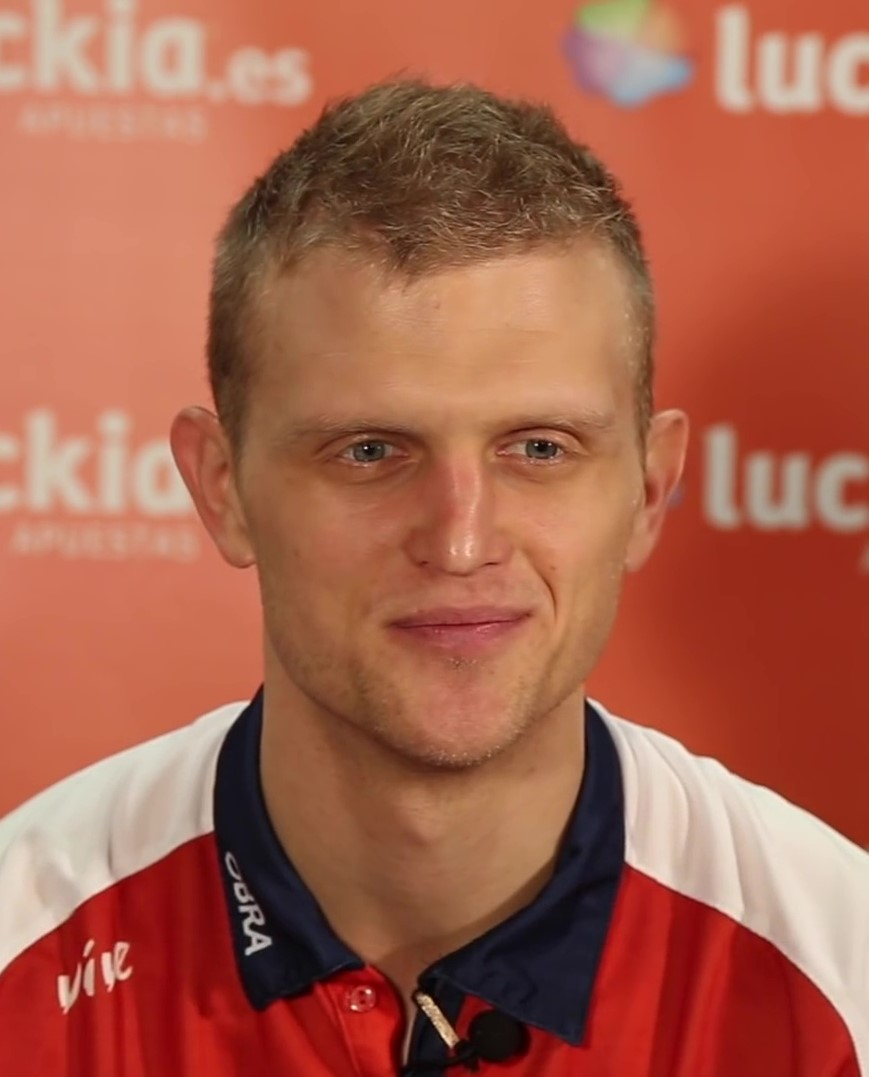

Personal information
- Born: April 11, 1991 (age 35) Belgium
- Listed height: 6 ft 5 in (1.96 m)
- Listed weight: 195 lb (88 kg)

Career information
- High school: Lone Peak (Highland, Utah)
- College: BYU (2009–2010, 2012–2015)
- NBA draft: 2015: undrafted
- Playing career: 2015–2020
- Position: Shooting guard

Career history
- 2015–2016: Obradoiro CAB
- 2016–2017: Anwil Włocławek
- 2018: St. John's Edge
- 2018–2020: Huesca
- 2020: Bilbao Basket

Career highlights
- WCC Player of the Year (2014); 3× First-team All-WCC (2013–2015); Third-team All-MWC (2010); 2× Utah Mr. Basketball (2008, 2009)

Martin Tyler Haws (born April 11, 1991) is an American professional basketball player. Haws was a standout high school basketball player, becoming the all-time leading scorer (1,772 points) at his school, being twice named Utah's Mr. Basketball, and winning Utah's Gatorade Player of the Year. At Brigham Young University (BYU), Haws was named the 2014 West Coast Conference Men's Basketball Player of the Year and set the school record for career points.

== High school career ==
Born in Belgium, Haws grew up in Alpine, Utah before attending Lone Peak High School in Highland, Utah from 2005 to 2009. As a sophomore in 2006–07, he averaged 18.8 points per game, led the state in free-throws made with 129, and shot 81.6% from the free-throw line, with the team winning the state championship. Following the state championship game, Haws was named the 5A State Tournament MVP and later won the 5A MVP award. As a junior in 2007–08, he averaged 20.6 points, 4.6 rebounds and 3.1 assists per game as he helped Lone Peak with the state championship for a second straight year. He won the Tournament MVP again as well as Utah's Mr. Basketball. On a national level, he won Utah's Gatorade Player of the Year, and became a finalist for the national award. Lone Peak also finished the year ranked 15th nationally according to Maxpreps.com. At the T-Mobile Invitational against Georgia's Centennial High School, Haws scored 26 points.

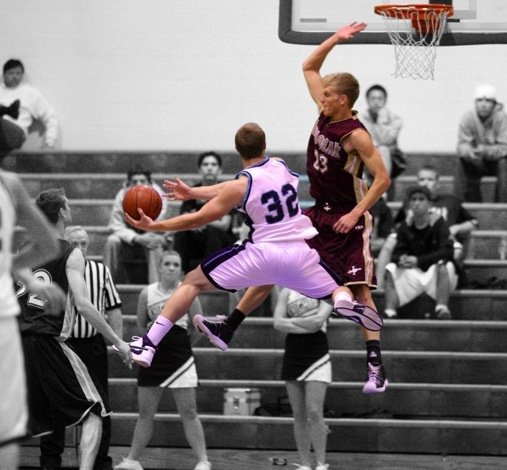
Haws defending a shot attempt while playing for Lone Peak High School

Haws played with Salt Lake Metro in the summer AAU circuits, as well as with his high school sponsored AAU team, Lone Peak. In the 2008 Houston Kingwood Classic, Haws led Salt Lake Metro into the round of 16, scoring 35 points against California powerhouse Compton Magic. He also led the Lone Peak AAU team to the round of 8 in the Las Vegas Spring Showcase a week later. Haws appeared in USA Today and Sports Illustrated in 2007.

Haws was recruited by Wake Forest, BYU, Utah, Stanford, Cal, Harvard, Penn, Marquette, UCLA, Pepperdine, USC, and Davidson. He committed to play collegiately at BYU and signed his letter of intent on November 12, 2008.

As a senior in 2008–09, Haws averaged 23.6 points, 8.3 rebounds and 2.7 assists per game. He set 21 school records as a senior and finished his career with 1,772 points tied for 10th in Utah state history, and the most ever by a 5A player in Utah. While coming up short in the quest for three straight 5A state titles, Haws won a second consecutive Mr. Basketball Award. He was selected to play in both the Senior Showcase High School All-Star Weekend as well as the Academic All-American Classic.

== College career ==
=== Freshman year ===
Haws started in his first game at BYU against Hawaii on November 20, 2009. He scored 12 points with an assist in 25 minutes of action in the 83–65 road win. Haws continued to play well in the next three games as he recorded 12 points and 2 rebounds in 26 minutes of action in a neutral site game against San Francisco. Three days later at home against Arizona State, Haws scored a team-high 17 points and added a team-high 11 rebounds to go with 3 assists in the 81–68 win. After the game, BYU head coach Dave Rose said, "Tyler is such a consistent, energy kind of player. He always gives you the same effort. Tonight, the way [ASU] game-planned, there was going to be an open guy. Someone was going to have to step up and hit those shots." In the following game at Fresno State, Haws scored 17 points again and added 4 rebounds. Haws said of his play and growing confidence in the college game, "I feel like every game I get a little more comfortable. I was able to knock down a few shots tonight and get a few rebounds for putbacks. I feel like it's going the right direction." Haws scored a career high 24 points against Wyoming on January 20, 2010 and grabbed a career high 11 rebounds in an 83–77 win on the road against UTEP. Haws was named third-team All-Mountain West Conference as a freshman after averaging 26.4 minutes per game (third on the team) along with 11.3 points, 4.2 rebounds, and 1.5 assists in 32 starts, the most by a BYU freshman under head coach Dave Rose. His free-throw percentage of 91.7 was the fourth-highest for a freshman in NCAA Division I history. He was also named Academic All-MWC. In the Cougars first round NCAA Tournament game, Haws scored 8 points with 2 assists and in the following game against Kansas State, he dropped in 14 with 3 rebounds. During his first season at BYU, he also intensely studied the game of his then-junior superstar teammate Jimmer Fredette. For the season, he averaged 11.3 points and 4.2 rebounds and shot .498 from the field, .368 from three and .917 from the free-throw line – a school record for freshmen and the fourth-best percentage in NCAA history for freshmen.

=== Sophomore year ===
Haws returned to a BYU team that had left the Mountain West for the West Coast Conference (WCC) in 2011. In his first season back from the mission field in 2012–13 as team captain, he scored 20 or more points in his first six games, and was the WCC's leading scorer that season, both overall and in conference games. He is only the second BYU sophomore to have scored 1,000 or more career points, after Danny Ainge. He was named WCC Player of the Week, SI.com and NBCSports.com National Player of the Week on December 31, 2012 after scoring 42 points against Virginia Tech. He went on to be named WCC Player of the Week again on January 14, 2013 after averaging 24 points and shooting .643 from the field, .400 from three and .909 from the free-throw line against Pepperdine and Santa Clara. For the season, he averaged 21.7 points, 4.6 rebounds, 2.0 assists and 1.3 steals and shot .483 from the field, .381 from three and .877 from the free throw line.

Haws was named to All-West Coast Conference Team, USBWA All-District VIII First Team and NABC All-District 9 First Team, while also receiving Bronze Honors on the WCC Commissioner's Honor Roll.

On June 29, 2013, Haws was selected as one of 12-players to represent Team USA at the 2013 World University games.

=== Junior year ===
In his junior year, Haws helped lead the Cougars to a 23–12 record, finishing as runner-up in the WCC tournament and going out in the second round of the NCAA tournament. He was named WCC Player of the Week on January 13, 2014 for averaging 33.0 points in wins over Loyola Marymount and Pepperdine. Ten days later, he scored a career high 48 points against Portland for third all-time in BYU history and tied for the most in the NCAA in 2013–14; he also set career highs in field goals made and attempted and three-point field goals attempted. He went on to be named WCC Player of the Week again on February 1, 2014 for averaging 35.5 points, 4.5 rebounds and 2.0 steals per game in wins over Pacific and Saint Mary's.

At the season's end, Haws earned Honorable Mention All-American honors by the Associated Press, as well as West Coast Conference Men's Basketball Player of the Year, All-WCC Team, WCC All-Tournament Team, USBWA All-District VIII First Team and NABC All-District 9 First Team honors. He received Bronze Honors on the WCC Commissioner's Honor Roll for the second straight year, and was named the Co-Male Athlete of the Year and received the Floyd Johnson Service Award at the 2014 Y Awards. For the season, he averaged 23.2 points, 3.8 rebounds, 1.5 assists and 1.0 steals and shot .463 from the field, .404 from three and .881 from the free-throw line.

=== Senior year ===
Haws helped BYU to a 25–10 record, shooting .471 from the field and .365 from three-point range. He averaged 21.9 points a game, 4.4 rebounds, and 2.2 assists per game. On February 26, 2015, Haws passed Jimmer Fredette for all-time leading scorer at BYU against Portland. Two days later, BYU upset No. 3 ranked Gonzaga 73–70, helping them get a signature win on their NCAA Tournament resume. BYU entered the WCC tournament as a No. 2 seed, facing off against Santa Clara in the first round. Haws scored 30 points, including a game-winning mid-range shot with 2.5 seconds to go, helping them win 78–76. BYU would eventually advance to the WCC championship, falling in a rematch to No. 7 ranked Gonzaga, 91–75. BYU was able to get a First Four matchup with Ole Miss in the NCAA tournament. Haws scored 33 points in his final game, as BYU fell 94–90.

=== College statistics ===
Year	Team	GP	GS	MPG	FG%	3P%	FT%	RPG	APG	SPG	BPG	PPG
2009–10	BYU	35	32	26.4	.498	.368	.917	4.2	1.5	0.7	0.1	11.3
2012–13	BYU	36	36	34.3	.483	.381	.877	4.6	2.0	1.3	0.1	21.7
2013–14	BYU	33	33	34.6	.463	.404	.881	3.8	1.5	1.0	0.3	23.2
2014–15	BYU	31	31	31.9	.471	.365	.872	4.4	2.2	1.0	0.3	21.9
Career		139	137	31.8	.479	.379	.883	4.3	1.8	1.0	0.2	19.6

== Personal ==
Haws served as a missionary for the Church of Jesus Christ of Latter-day Saints for two years (2010–2012) in Quezon City, Philippines between his freshman and sophomore years of college. Haws' father is former BYU point guard Marty Haws who played for the Cougars from 1986 to 1990, and his younger brother TJ played for BYU from 2016 to 2020.

== See also ==
- List of NCAA Division I men's basketball career free throw scoring leaders
