= Alex Jensen =

American basketball player and coach (born 1976)

Utah Utes
- Title: Head coach
- League: Big 12 Conference

Personal information
- Born: May 16, 1976 (age 50)
- Listed height: 6 ft 7 in (2.01 m)
- Listed weight: 225 lb (102 kg)

Career information
- High school: Viewmont (Bountiful, Utah)
- College: Utah (1994–1995, 1997–2000)
- NBA draft: 2000: undrafted
- Playing career: 2000–2007
- Position: Small forward

Career history

Playing
- 2000–2002: Darüşşafaka
- 2002: Girona
- 2002–2003: Yakima Sun Kings
- 2003–2005: Tuborg Pilsener
- 2005–2006: Türk Telekom
- 2006: Mitsubishi Melco Dolphins
- 2007: TED Ankara Kolejliler

Coaching
- 2007–2011: Saint Louis (assistant)
- 2011–2013: Canton Charge
- 2015: Germany (assistant)
- 2013–2023: Utah Jazz (assistant)
- 2023–2025: Dallas Mavericks (assistant)
- 2025–present: Utah

Career highlights
- As player: CBA champion (2003); CBA All-Defensive Team (2003); MWC Player of the Year (2000); First-team All-MWC (2000); First-team All-WAC (1999); Utah Mr. Basketball (1994); As coach: NBA D-League Coach of the Year (2013)

Alexander Young Jensen (born May 16, 1976) is an American former professional basketball player, and current head coach for the University of Utah. He was a standout college player for the Utes.

== College career ==
Jensen, the 1994 Utah Mr. Basketball from Centerville, played for coach Rick Majerus at Utah. As a freshman, he averaged 24.8 minutes, 6.7 points and 6.1 rebounds per game. Following his first season, Jensen left to complete a two-year Latter-day Saint mission in England.

Upon returning from his mission, Jensen entered the starting lineup for the 1997–98 season. Jensen and teammates Andre Miller, Michael Doleac, and Hanno Möttölä, led the Utes to one of the best seasons in school history, as the Utes went 30–4 and played for the 1998 National Championship, losing to Kentucky. Jensen averaged 6.8 points and 5.2 rebounds and was named to the All-West Regional team for the NCAA tournament.

As a junior, Jensen took another step in his development as he made the All-Western Athletic Conference team (Pacific Division) and the WAC All-Defensive team after averaging 12.1 points and 7.6 rebounds per game. He was also the 1999 WAC men's basketball tournament MVP as he led the Utes back to the NCAA tournament. As a senior, Jensen was the first Mountain West Conference Player of the Year as the Utes became a charter member of the league. Jensen averaged 13.1 points and 7.5 rebounds per game that season and scored 1,279 points and collected 896 rebounds for his college career.

== Professional career ==
Following the close of his college career, Jensen began an international career that would bring him to Spain, Japan and Turkey. While he was in Turkey, he was named All-FIBA Europe Cup Defender of the Year in 2004. He also played a season in the Continental Basketball Association for the Yakima Sun Kings, winning a league championship and earning All-Defensive Team honors in 2003.

== Coaching career ==
In 2007, Jensen left professional basketball to become an assistant coach for his mentor, Rick Majerus, as a member of his new staff at Saint Louis. Jensen remained on Majerus' staff for four seasons, until he was offered the job as the first head coach of the Canton Charge of the NBA Development League. Jensen was named the NBA D-League's Coach of the Year for 2013 in just his second season. On July 23, 2013, Jensen was added to the Utah Jazz coaching staff to work as a player development assistant. Two years later, on June 26, 2015, he joined Chris Fleming's staff as an assistant for the Germany national team. In August 2022, Jensen led the United States as head coach for the 2022 FIBA AmeriCup. In 2023, he parted ways with the Jazz, and joined the Dallas Mavericks as an assistant coach.

On March 6, 2025, Jensen was appointed head coach of the Utah Utes men's basketball team.

== Head coaching record ==
Record table
Season	Team	Overall	Conference	Standing	Postseason
Utah Utes (Big 12 Conference) (2025–present)
2025–26	Utah	10–22	2–16	16th	
2026–27	Utah	3–0	0–0		
Utah:		13–22 (.371)	2–16 (.111)		
Total:		13–22 (.371)			
National champion Postseason invitational champion Conference regular season champion Conference regular season and conference tournament champion Division regular season champion Division regular season and conference tournament champion Conference tournament champion
