= D. J. Tialavea =

American football player (born 1991)

D.J. Tialavea
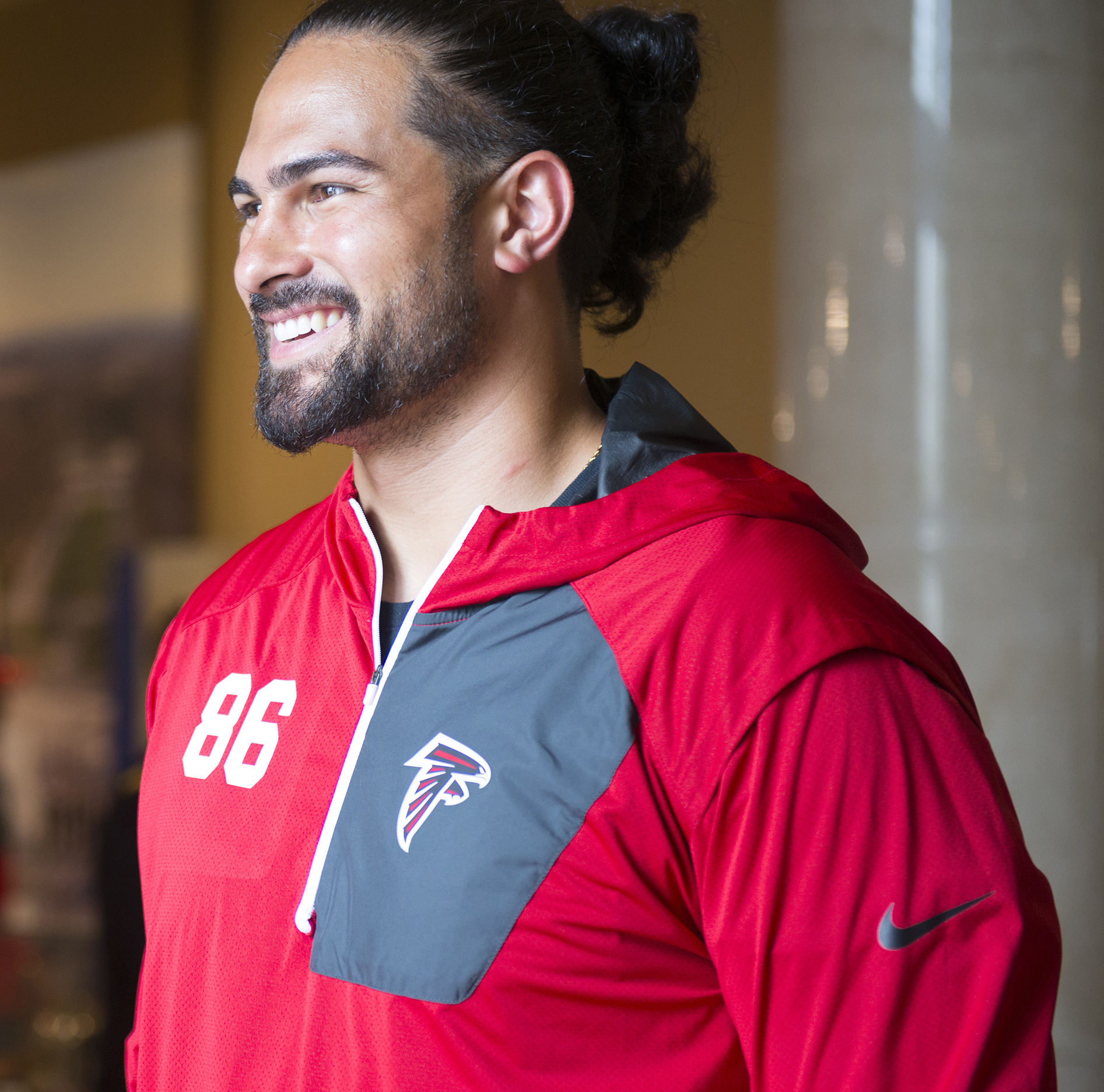
- D. J. Tialavea in 2017

Utah State Aggies
- Title: Senior Offensive Analyst

Personal information
- Born: July 27, 1991 (age 35); West Jordan, Utah
- Listed height: 6 ft 4 in (1.93 m)
- Listed weight: 260 lb (118 kg)

Career information
- High school: West Jordan (UT)
- College: Utah State
- NFL draft: 2014: undrafted

Career history

Playing
- Jacksonville Jaguars (2014)*; Buffalo Bills (2014)*; Atlanta Falcons (2015–2016); Chicago Bears (2017)*
- * Offseason or practice squad member only

Coaching
- Utah State (2020) Graduate assistant; Utah State (2021–2024) Tight ends coach; Oklahoma State (2025) Tight ends coach; Utah State (2026) Senior offensive analyst

Career NFL statistics
- Games played: 2
- Receptions: 1
- Receiving yards: 1
- Receiving touchdowns: 1
- Stats at Pro Football Reference

Donald Tialavea Jr. (born July 27, 1991) is an American former professional football tight end who is currently senior offensive analyst for Utah State. He also played college football at Utah State University. He signed with the Jacksonville Jaguars in 2014 as an undrafted free agent. Tialavea was formerly a tight end prior to switching positions before the 2017 NFL season.

== Early life ==
Tialavea attended West Jordan High School in West Jordan, Utah. During his high school football career, he also played on the offensive and defensive lines. In addition to being a three-year letterwinner in football, Tialavea was also a three-year letterwinner in basketball and baseball.

== College career ==
Tialavea appeared in 40 games for the Utah State Aggies. He ended his college career with 198 receiving yards and five touchdowns.

== Professional career ==
=== Jacksonville Jaguars ===
Tialavea was signed by the Jacksonville Jaguars after going undrafted in the 2014 NFL draft. He was released on May 12, 2014.

=== Buffalo Bills ===
After being released by the Jaguars, Tialavea was signed to the Buffalo Bills practice squad on September 2, 2014. He was released by the Bills on September 30, 2014.

=== Atlanta Falcons ===
Tialavea was signed to the Falcons' practice squad on November 24, 2015. After spending almost two seasons on the practice squad, he was promoted to the active roster on December 22, 2016. In his NFL debut two days later against the Carolina Panthers, Tialavea caught a touchdown for his only reception of the day.

Tialavea was inactive for the Falcons' 34-28 overtime loss to the New England Patriots in the Super Bowl.

On September 1, 2017, Tialavea was released by the Falcons.

=== Chicago Bears ===
On September 20, 2017, Tialavea was signed to the Chicago Bears' practice squad. He was released on September 26, 2017. He was re-signed on December 27, 2017.

== Coaching career ==
=== Utah State ===
In 2020, Tialavea joined the coaching staff at his alma mater, Utah State, as a graduate assistant working with the tight ends. Head Coach Gary Andersen was fired mid-season that year. The following January, Tialavea was promoted to tight ends coach by newly hired head coach Blake Anderson.

Oklahoma State

On December 14, 2024, Tialavea was hired as the tight ends coach at Oklahoma State.

== Personal life ==
D.J.'s parents are Don and Tami Tialavea. He has two sisters. Tialavea graduated from Utah State with a degree in sports management in 2013, and then a master's degree in education in 2019, also from Utah State. D.J. is also an Eagle Scout.
