= West Jordan High School =

Location
- 8136 S 2700 W West Jordan, Utah 84088; United States; 40°36′11″N 111°57′36″W

Information
- Type: Public
- Established: 1981
- School district: Jordan School District
- Principal: Michael Hutchings
- Faculty: 83.16 (FTE)
- Grades: 10 - 12
- Enrollment: 1,870 (2023-2024)
- Student to teacher ratio: 22.49
- Colors: Black and Columbia blue
- Team name: Jaguars
- Website: Official website

West Jordan High School is a public high school located southwest of Salt Lake City in West Jordan, Utah. It enrolls around 1,800 students.

== History ==
The school opened in 1981 with an expected enrollment of 1,298. The Jordan School District paid over $15 million (equivalent to $58.61 million in 2025) for the contract to build West Jordan High.

In 2023, a former teacher from the school was charged by police with 19 felony counts including rape, forcible sexual abuse, and obstruction of justice. He is accused of raping a female student in his classroom multiple times.

== Extracurriculars ==
The men's varsity basketball team won the 2001 state championship, as well as the 2009 State championship against Lone Peak High School, the two-time defending champion.

West Jordan is well known for its music program. It has one of the largest choir programs of any public school in the state, with a record enrollment of over 300 students. The band and orchestra programs also consistently score well in competitions.

== Notable alumni ==
- Travis Hall, NFL player
- John Penisini, NFL player
- D. J. Tialavea, NFL player
