= Eric Mika =

American basketball player (born 1995)

Free agent
- Position: Center

Personal information
- Born: January 5, 1995 (age 31) Boston, Massachusetts, U.S.
- Listed height: 6 ft 10 in (2.08 m)
- Listed weight: 233 lb (106 kg)

Career information
- High school: Lone Peak (Highland, Utah)
- College: BYU (2013–2014, 2016–2017)
- NBA draft: 2017: undrafted
- Playing career: 2017–present

Career history
- 2017–2018: Victoria Libertas Pesaro
- 2018–2019: Basket Brescia Leonessa
- 2019: Medi Bayreuth
- 2019: Stockton Kings
- 2019: Xinjiang Flying Tigers
- 2020: Stockton Kings
- 2020: Sacramento Kings
- 2020: Stockton Kings
- 2020–2021: Partizan
- 2021–2022: JL Bourg
- 2022–2024: NBA G League Ignite

Career highlights
- NBA G League Next Up Game (2023); First-team All-WCC (2017); WCC All-Freshman Team (2014); Second-team Academic All-American (2017)
- Stats at NBA.com
- Stats at Basketball Reference

Eric Mika (born January 5, 1995) is an American professional basketball player who last played for the NBA G League Ignite of the NBA G League. He played college basketball for the BYU Cougars.

== High school career ==
Mika played at Waterford School his freshman and sophomore seasons before attending Lone Peak High School in Highland, Utah for his final 2 seasons. Mika help lead Lone Peak to a 26–1 record, the 2012-13 MaxPreps.com National Title and the 5A Utah state title with other future BYU Cougars Nick Emery and T.J. Haws.

== College career ==
Mika played college basketball for BYU. He was named to the WCC All-Freshman Team and averaged double figures in points.

Mika returned to a BYU team and in his first season back from the mission field in 2016–17 he averaged 20.3 points and 9.2 rebounds a game. Mika was named to the All-West Coast Conference team.

== Professional career ==
=== Consultinvest Pesaro (2017–2018) ===
Mika declared for the 2017 NBA draft after his sophomore season. After going undrafted, Mika joined the Miami Heat for the NBA Summer League, then ultimately signed with Consultinvest Pesaro in Italy.

=== Basket Brescia Leonessa (2018–2019) ===
On July 9, 2018, Mika signed a deal with Basket Brescia Leonessa.

=== Medi Bayreuth (2019) ===
On January 8, 2019, Mika signed a contract with Medi Bayreuth of the German Basketball Bundesliga.

=== Stockton Kings (2019) ===
On August 20, 2019, Mika signed an Exhibit 10 contract with the Sacramento Kings. On October 11, 2019, Mika was waived by the Kings and ultimately included in the roster of Stockton Kings, NBA G League affiliate team of the Sacramento Kings.

=== Xinjiang Flying Tigers (2019) ===
On December 6, 2019, the Xinjiang Flying Tigers announced that they had added Mika to their roster. On December 27, 2019, Mika was removed from the roster of the Xinjiang Flying Tigers.

=== Second stint with Stockton Kings (2020) ===
On January 7, 2020, the Stockton Kings announced that they had acquired Mika.

=== Sacramento Kings (2020) ===
On February 1, 2020, Mika signed a 10-day contract with the Sacramento Kings. He made his NBA debut the same day, scoring six points with seven rebounds in 19 minutes as the Kings lost to the Los Angeles Lakers 129–113. On February 6, the Sacramento Kings announced that they had requested waiver on Mika.

=== Third stint with Stockton Kings (2020) ===
Mika was reported to have returned to Stockton Kings after being waived by the Sacramento Kings on February 6, 2020. He averaged 18.7 points and 11.9 rebounds per game in the 2019–20 season.

=== Partizan Belgrade (2020–2021) ===
On August 24, 2020, Mika signed a contract with the Partizan. He averaged 7.9 points, 3.4 rebounds, and 1.4 assists per game.

=== JL Bourg (2021–2022) ===
On July 1, 2021, Mika signed with JL Bourg of LNB Pro A.

=== NBA G League Ignite (2022–2023) ===
On September 28, 2022, Mika signed with the NBA G League Ignite and was named to the G League's inaugural Next Up Game for the 2022–23 season. On January 31, 2024, he was waived by the Ignite.

== Personal ==
Mika served as a missionary for the Church of Jesus Christ of Latter-day Saints for two years in Rome, Italy between his freshman and sophomore years of college.

== Career statistics ==
Legend
GP	Games played	GS	Games started	MPG	Minutes per game
FG%	Field goal percentage	3P%	3-point field goal percentage	FT%	Free throw percentage
RPG	Rebounds per game	APG	Assists per game	SPG	Steals per game
BPG	Blocks per game	PPG	Points per game	**Bold**	Career high

=== NBA ===
==== Regular season ====
Year	Team	GP	GS	MPG	FG%	3P%	FT%	RPG	APG	SPG	BPG	PPG
2019–20	Sacramento	1	0	19.0	.667	-	1.000	7.0	.0	.0	.0	6.0
Career		1	0	19.0	.667	-	1.000	7.0	.0	.0	.0	6.0

=== College ===
Year	Team	GP	GS	MPG	FG%	3P%	FT%	RPG	APG	SPG	BPG	PPG
2013–14	BYU	33	28	25.5	.527	-	.617	6.4	1.0	0.5	0.7	11.8
2016–17	BYU	**34**	**34**	**28.6**	**.528**	.000	**.763**	**9.2**	**1.6**	**0.6**	**1.9**	**20.3**
Career		67	62	27.1	.528	.000	.707	7.8	1.3	0.5	1.3	16.1
