= Lone Peak High School =

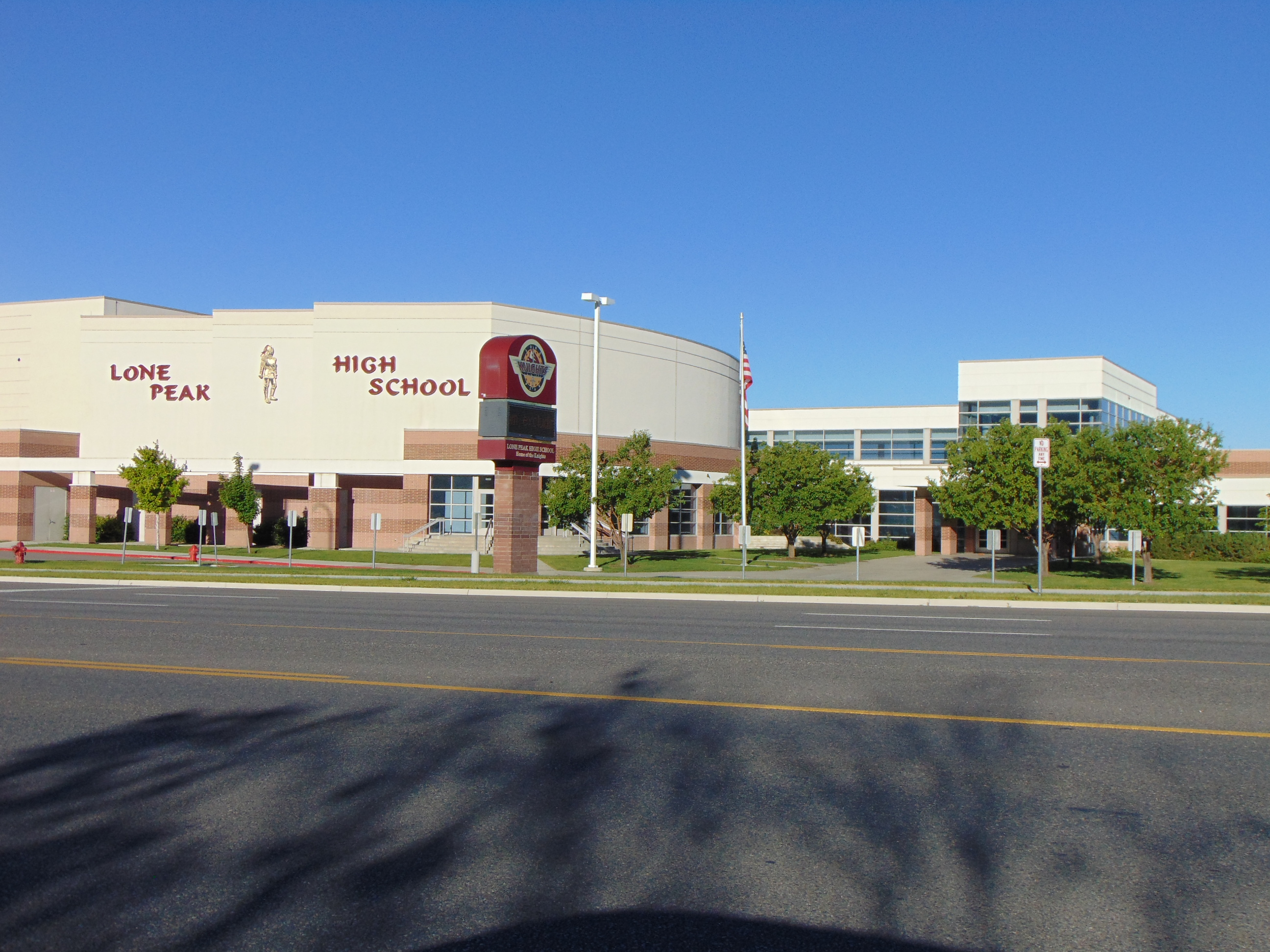
- Looking west across North County Boulevard (SR-129) at Lone Peak High School, June 2016

Location
- 10189 North 4800 West (North County Boulevard/SR-129); Highland, Utah 84003; United States; 40.41758°N 111.77603°W

Information
- Type: Free public
- Opened: 1997
- School district: Alpine School District
- Principal: Tim Thompson
- Teaching staff: 88.63 (FTE)
- Grades: 10–12
- Gender: Coed
- Enrollment: 2,507 (2023-2024)
- Student to teacher ratio: 28.29
- Colors: Maroon; Black; Gold
- Fight song: Lone Peak High School Fight song
- Mascot: Knights
- Team name: Knights
- Newspaper: Crusader
- Yearbook: Epic
- Website: lphs.alpineschools.org

Lone Peak High School (LPHS) is a public high school in Highland, Utah, United States. Part of the Alpine School District, in northern Utah County, it was built in 1997 to serve students in the cities of Alpine, Highland, and Cedar Hills. Lone Peak High School was given athletic 5A status beginning at the 2005-2006 school year. However, it has since been given a 6A status. The school mascot is a knight.

== Academics ==
Lone Peak offers several honors classes and AP courses, as well as off-campus classes at nearby colleges such as Brigham Young University, University of Utah, Utah Valley University, and business and technical colleges.

=== Athletics ===
Lone Peak sponsors several interscholastic teams for both boys and girls: basketball, cross country, soccer, swimming, tennis, golf, and track and field. For boys there are teams competing in baseball, football, and wrestling. Girls may also compete in cheerleading, drill team, softball, and volleyball.

==== State Championships ====
Teams that have won state championships sponsored by the Utah High School Activities Association:

- Basketball (girls): 2022, 2023, 2024
- Basketball (boys): 2001, 2007, 2008, 2011, 2012, 2013, 2014, 2018
- Football: 2011, 2018, 2021
- Soccer (boys): 2005
- Swimming (girls): 1998, 1999, 2001, 2002, 2005, 2021, 2022, 2023, 2024
- Track & field (girls): 1999, 2000
- Golf (girls): 2016
- Tennis (girls): 2011, 2012, 2014, 2015, 2017
- Volleyball (girls): 2010, 2016, 2017, 2018
- (Not UHSAA Sanctioned) Mountain biking: 2017, 2018, 2020, 2026

The 2013 boys' basketball team was ranked as the top team in the nation by numerous ranking systems including USA Today and MaxPreps, thus crowning them national champions. Lone Peak's biggest rivals are American Fork High School and Skyridge High School.

== Notable Alumni ==

- C. J. Ah You - NFL defensive end, defensive tackle
- Nikki Bohne - Broadway actress, singer, and dancer
- John Henry Daley - college football defensive end for the Utah Utes
- Jackson Emery - Utah's Mr. Basketball 2005; former BYU basketball player and All-Time MWC steals leader
- Justin Hamilton - Professional basketball center
- Jacob Hannemann - Professional baseball player
- Chase Hansen - Utah’s Mr. Football 2011; NFL Linebacker
- Tyler Haws - Utah's Mr. Basketball 2008 and 2009; BYU basketball player
- Frank Jackson - basketball point guard for the Detroit Pistons
- Eric Mika - Professional basketball player
- Shawn Murphy - NFL offensive guard
- Kiersten White - New York Times bestselling author
- Calvin Whiting - Major League Rugby player for the Utah Warriors
- Jordan Kerr - Professional Ultimate Frisbee player for the Salt Lake Shred

== See also ==
- List of high schools in Utah
