= Highland, Utah =

City in Utah, United States

- City
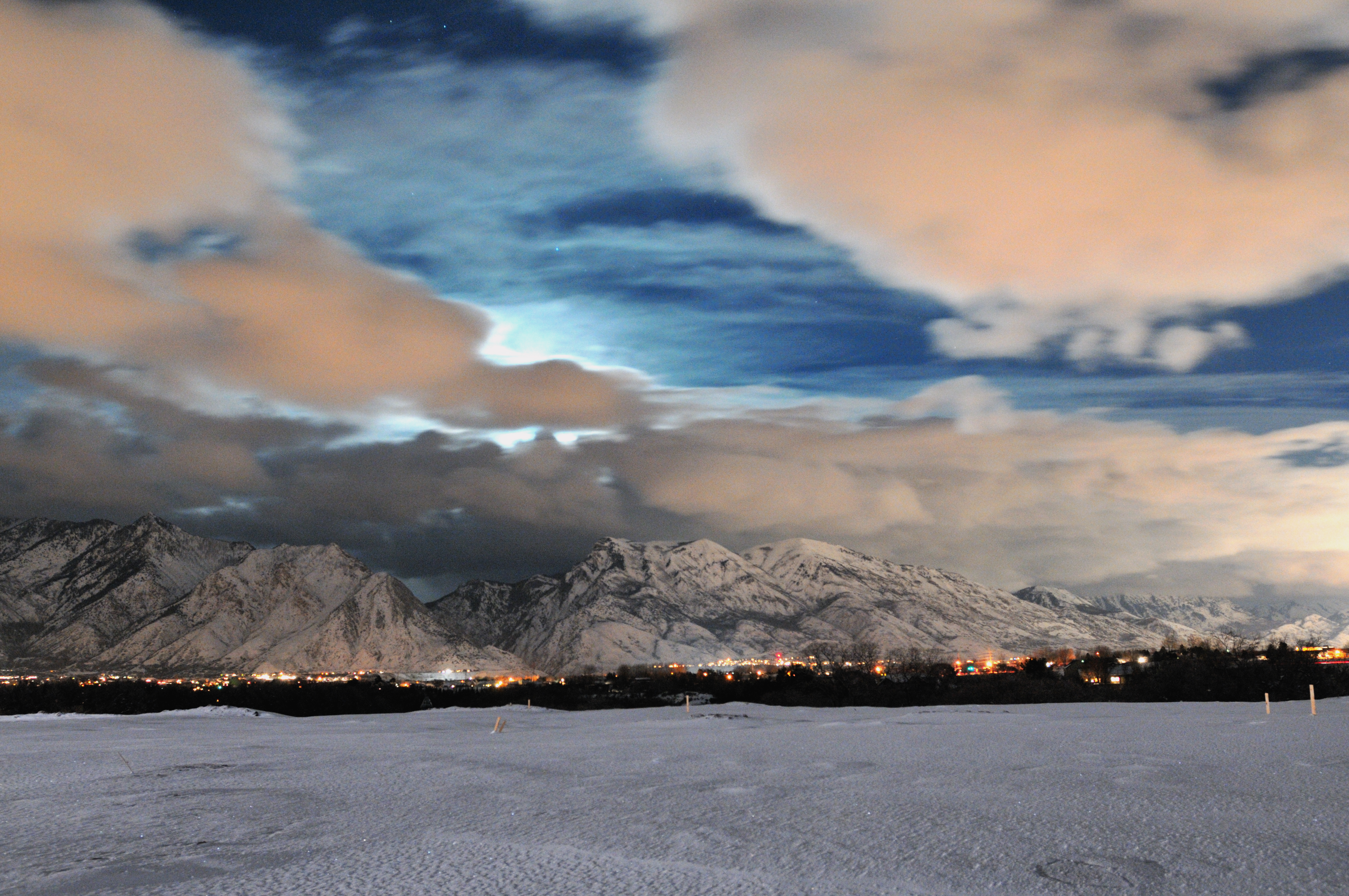
- Highland at night, January 2008

- Location in Utah County and the state of Utah
- Coordinates: 40°25′43″N 111°46′32″W
- Country: United States
- State: Utah
- County: Utah
- Settled: 1870s
- Incorporated: July 13, 1977

Area
  - Total: 8.64 sq mi (22.39 km^{2})
  - Land: 8.64 sq mi (22.39 km^{2})
  - Water: 0 sq mi (0.00 km^{2})
- Elevation: 4,876 ft (1,486 m)

Population (2020)
  - Total: 19,348
  - Density: 2,238/sq mi (864.1/km^{2})
- Time zone: UTC-7 (Mountain (MST))
  - Summer (DST): UTC-6 (MDT)
- ZIP code: 84003
- Area codes: 385, 801
- FIPS code: 49-35190
- GNIS feature ID: 2410760
- Website: www.highlandut.gov

Highland is a city in Utah County, Utah, United States. It is approximately 30 miles (48 km) south of Salt Lake City and is part of the Provo–Orem Metropolitan Statistical Area. According to the 2020 census, the population was 19,348, a nearly 25% increase over the 2010 figure of 15,523.

== Geography ==
According to the United States Census Bureau, the city has a total area of 8.5 square miles (22.1 km^{2}), all land.

== History ==
Highland was settled by homesteaders in the 1870s. It was named by Scottish Mormon immigrants who felt the area resembled the highlands of Scotland.

== Demographics ==
Historical population
Census	Pop.	Note	%±
1900	195		—
1910	171		−12.3%
1920	247		44.4%
1930	277		12.1%
1940	270		−2.5%
1950	287		6.3%
1970	208		—
1980	2,435		1,070.7%
1990	5,002		105.4%
2000	8,172		63.4%
2010	15,523		90.0%
2020	19,348		24.6%
U.S. Decennial Census

=== 2020 census ===
As of the 2020 census, Highland had a population of 19,348. The median age was 26.9 years. 36.6% of residents were under the age of 18 and 9.5% of residents were 65 years of age or older. For every 100 females there were 101.1 males, and for every 100 females age 18 and over there were 97.8 males age 18 and over.

99.9% of residents lived in urban areas, while 0.1% lived in rural areas.

There were 4,627 households in Highland, of which 56.6% had children under the age of 18 living in them. Of all households, 84.0% were married-couple households, 5.3% were households with a male householder and no spouse or partner present, and 10.2% were households with a female householder and no spouse or partner present. About 6.2% of all households were made up of individuals and 3.2% had someone living alone who was 65 years of age or older.

There were 4,761 housing units, of which 2.8% were vacant. The homeowner vacancy rate was 0.6% and the rental vacancy rate was 4.7%.

Racial composition as of the 2020 census
Race	Number	Percent
White	17,636	91.2%
Black or African American	70	0.4%
American Indian and Alaska Native	59	0.3%
Asian	241	1.2%
Native Hawaiian and Other Pacific Islander	89	0.5%
Some other race	147	0.8%
Two or more races	1,106	5.7%
Hispanic or Latino (of any race)	860	4.4%

=== 2010 census ===
As of the 2010 census, Highland had a population of 15,523. The median age was 22. The racial makeup of the population was 95.9% white, 0.5% black or African American, 0.2% Native American, 0.7% Asian, 0.7% Pacific Islander, 0.5% from some other race, and 1.5% from two or more races. 2.8% of the population was Hispanic or Latino of any race.

=== 2000 census ===
At the 2000 census, there were 8,172 people in 1,804 households, including 1,733 families, in the city. The population density was 1,174.0 people per square mile (453.3/km^{2}). There were 1,864 housing units at an average density of 267.8 per square mile (103.4/km^{2}). The racial makeup of the city was 97.49% White, 0.12% African American, 0.13% Native American, 0.31% Asian, 0.10% Pacific Islander, 0.73% from other races, and 1.11% from two or more races. Hispanic or Latino of any race were 2.17%.

Of the 1,804 households, 66.5% had children under 18 living with them, 90.6% were married couples living together, 4.0% had a female householder with no husband present, and 3.9% were non-families. 3.3% of households were one person, and 1.7% were one person aged 65 or older. The average household size was 4.53, and the average family size was 4.64.

The age distribution was 45.1% under the age of 18, 9.8% from 18 to 24, 23.5% from 25 to 44, 17.3% from 45 to 64, and 4.3% 65 or older. The median age was 21 years. For every 100 females, there were 104.4 males. For every 100 females aged 18 and over, there were 99.2 males.

The median household income was $80,053, and the median family income was $81,086. Males had a median income of $57,318 versus $24,440 for females. The per capita income for the city was $19,614. About 1.8% of families and 2.8% of the population were below the poverty line, including 3.6% of those under age 18 and none of those age 65 or over.

=== Religion ===
An estimation by bestplaces.net claimed that 95.7% of the people in Highland are religious, with 93.3% being members of The Church of Jesus Christ of Latter Day Saints (Mormons). 1.4% are Catholic, 0.2% are Methodist, 0.1% are Baptist, 0.4% are of another Christian faith, and 0.3% are of an eastern faith. This makes 4.3% of the city non-religious.

== Education ==
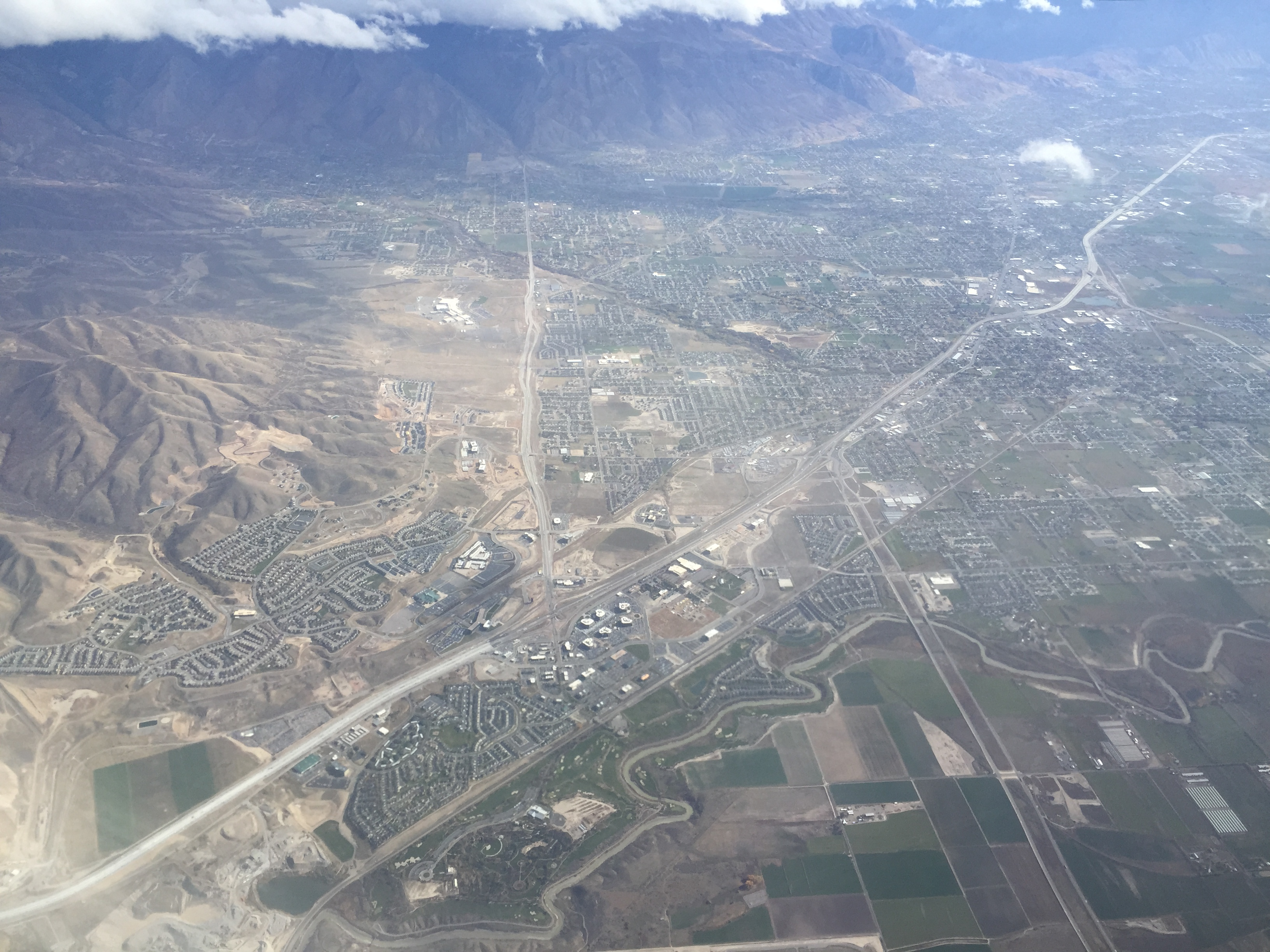
View of Lehi (foreground), American Fork (upper right) and Highland (upper left) from an airplane, November 2015

Highland Public schools are part of the Alpine School District. Dr. Shane Farnsworth is the Superintendent of Schools.

== Notable people ==
- Thurl Bailey, retired NBA basketball player, whose career spanned from 1983 to 1999 with the Utah Jazz and the Minnesota Timberwolves
- Fraser Bullock, managing director of Sorenson Capital and former COO of the 2002 Winter Olympics
- Blair Buswell, an artist who specializes in sports sculptures
- Ashly DelGrosso, professional dancer, known for Dancing with the Stars
- Larry M. Gibson, entrepreneur and former first counselor in the general presidency of the Young Men organization of the Church of Jesus Christ of Latter-day Saints
- Tyler Haws, BYU basketball player
- Brandon Mull, writer, best known as the author of the popular Fablehaven series
- Dennis Smith, sculptor
- Alexis Warr, professional dancer, known for Dancing with the Stars and Strictly Come Dancing

== See also ==
- List of cities and towns in Utah
- Lone Peak Fire District
