= 1943–44 NCAA men's basketball season =

Men's collegiate basketball season

- NCAA Tournament: 1944
- Tournament dates: March 24 – 28, 1944
- National Championship: Madison Square Garden; New York City, New York
- NCAA Champions: Utah Redskins
- Helms National Champions: Army Cadets
- Other champions: St. John's Redmen (NIT)
- Player of the Year (Helms): George Mikan, DePaul Blue Demons

The 1943–44 NCAA men's basketball season began in December 1943, progressed through the regular season and conference tournaments, and concluded with the 1944 NCAA basketball tournament championship game on March 28, 1944, at Madison Square Garden in New York City, New York. The Utah Redskins won their first NCAA national championship with a 42–40 victory over the Dartmouth Indians.

== Season headlines ==
- The Metropolitan New York Conference and the Mountain States (or Skyline) Conference did not compete during the season. Their members played as independents.
- Two teams from the same conference took part in the NCAA tournament for the first time, when Iowa State and Missouri, both of the Big Six Conference, participated in the Western regionals of the 1944 NCAA tournament.
- Arkansas was selected for the 1944 NCAA tournament but was forced to withdraw after a March 1944 automobile accident injured two Razorbacks starters and killed a physical education teacher who traveled with the team as a coaching assistant.
- Utah replaced Arkansas in the NCAA Tournament and became the first team to play in both the National Invitation Tournament and the NCAA tournament in the same season.
- Arnie Ferrin of Utah became the first freshman named NCAA tournament Most Outstanding Player.
- Army went undefeated (15–0), and the Helms Athletic Foundation selected Army rather than 1944 NCAA Tournament winner Utah as its national champion. It was the third time in history that the Helms champion differed from the NCAA champion.
- In 1995, the Premo-Porretta Power Poll retroactively selected Army as its top-ranked team for the 1943–44 season.

== Conference membership changes ==
School	Former conference	New conference
Georgetown Hoyas	Independent	No athletic programs
Harvard Crimson	Eastern Intercollegiate Basketball League	Independent
Hofstra Flying Dutchmen	Metropolitan New York Conference	Non-major basketball program
Northeastern Huskies	New England Conference	Independent
Yale Bulldogs	Eastern Intercollegiate Basketball League	Independent

== Regular season ==
=== Conferences ===
==== Conference winners and tournaments ====
Conference	Regular season winner	Conference player of the year	Conference tournament	Tournament venue (City)	Tournament winner
Big Six Conference	Iowa State & Oklahoma	None selected	No Tournament		
Big Ten Conference	Ohio State	None selected	No Tournament		
Border Conference	New Mexico & Arizona State–Flagstaff	None selected	No Tournament		
Eastern Intercollegiate Basketball League	Dartmouth	None selected	No Tournament		
Metropolitan New York Conference	Did not play as conference				
Missouri Valley Conference	Oklahoma A&M	None selected	No Tournament		
New England Conference	Connecticut		No Tournament		
Pacific Coast Conference	Washington (North); California (South)		No Tournament		
Mountain States (Skyline) Conference	Did not play as conference				
Southeastern Conference	Kentucky	None selected	1944 SEC men's basketball tournament	Jefferson County Armory, (Louisville, Kentucky)	Kentucky
Southern Conference	North Carolina	None selected	1944 Southern Conference men's basketball tournament	Thompson Gym (Raleigh, North Carolina)	Duke
Southwest Conference	Arkansas & Rice	None selected	No Tournament		

==== Conference standings ====
1943–44 Big Six Conference men's basketball standings
	Conf.				Overall
Team	W		L	PCT	W		L	PCT
Iowa State	9	–	1	.900	14	–	4	.778
Oklahoma	9	–	1	.900	15	–	8	.652
Kansas	5	–	5	.500	17	–	9	.654
Missouri	5	–	5	.500	10	–	9	.526
Kansas State	1	–	9	.100	7	–	15	.318
Nebraska	1	–	9	.100	2	–	13	.133

1943–44 Big Ten Conference men's basketball standings
	Conf.				Overall
Team	W		L	PCT	W		L	PCT
Ohio State	10	–	2	.833	14	–	7	.667
Iowa	9	–	3	.750	14	–	4	.778
Wisconsin	9	–	3	.750	12	–	9	.571
Northwestern	8	–	4	.667	12	–	7	.632
Purdue	8	–	4	.667	11	–	10	.524
Illinois	5	–	7	.417	11	–	9	.550
Michigan	5	–	7	.417	8	–	10	.444
Minnesota	2	–	10	.167	7	–	14	.333
Indiana	2	–	10	.167	7	–	15	.318
Chicago	0	–	8	.000	1	–	19	.050

1943–44 Border Conference men's basketball standings
	Conf.				Overall
Team	W		L	PCT	W		L	PCT
New Mexico	3	–	0	1.000	11	–	2	.846
Texas Tech	0	–	3	.000	5	–	18	.217
Arizona State–Flagstaff		–		–	2	–	0	1.000
Arizona		–		–	12	–	2	.857
Arizona State–Tempe		–		–	12	–	2	.857

1943–44 Eastern Intercollegiate Basketball League standings
	Conf.				Overall
Team	W		L	PCT	W		L	PCT
Dartmouth	8	–	0	1.000	19	–	2	.905
Pennsylvania	6	–	2	.750	10	–	4	.714
Cornell	2	–	6	.250	9	–	11	.450
Columbia	2	–	6	.250	7	–	9	.438
Princeton	2	–	6	.250	6	–	12	.333

1943–44 Missouri Valley Conference men's basketball standings
	Conf.				Overall
Team	W		L	PCT	W		L	PCT
Oklahoma A&M†		–		–	27	–	6	.818
Washington University		–		–	12	–	5	.706
Tulsa		–		–	5	–	3	.625
Drake		–		–	7	–	13	.350
† Regular-season championship winner

1943–44 New England Conference men's basketball standings
	Conf.				Overall
Team	W		L	PCT	W		L	PCT
Connecticut	6	–	0	1.000	10	–	9	.526
Rhode Island State	4	–	2	.667	14	–	6	.700
Northeastern	1	–	5	.167	8	–	8	.500
Maine	1	–	5	.167	4	–	6	.400

1943–44 Pacific Coast Conference men's basketball standings
	Conf.				Overall
Team	W		L	PCT	W		L	PCT
North
Washington	15	–	1	.938	26	–	6	.813
Oregon	11	–	5	.688	16	–	10	.615
Idaho	5	–	11	.313	7	–	16	.304
Oregon State	5	–	11	.313	8	–	16	.333
Washington State	4	–	12	.250	8	–	19	.296
South
California	4	–	0	1.000	7	–	3	.700
UCLA	3	–	3	.500	10	–	10	.500
USC	1	–	5	.167	8	–	12	.400

1943–44 Southeastern Conference men's basketball standings
	Conf.				Overall
Team	W		L	PCT	W		L	PCT
Tulane	4	–	0	1.000	16	–	6	.727
Georgia Tech	2	–	0	1.000	14	–	4	.778
Georgia	0	–	2	.000	7	–	10	.412
LSU	0	–	4	.000	10	–	15	.400
Kentucky †		–		–	19	–	2	.905
Vanderbilt		–		–	12	–	3	.800
† Regular-season championship and SEC Tournament winner

1943–44 Southern Conference men's basketball standings
	Conf.				Overall
Team	W		L	PCT	W		L	PCT
North Carolina	9	–	1	.900	17	–	10	.630
Virginia Tech	4	–	1	.800	11	–	4	.733
Duke †	4	–	2	.667	13	–	13	.500
Maryland	2	–	1	.667	4	–	14	.222
Richmond	2	–	2	.500	7	–	6	.538
Davidson	3	–	4	.429	16	–	7	.696
South Carolina	1	–	2	.333	13	–	2	.867
Clemson	1	–	2	.333	1	–	10	.091
North Carolina State	2	–	5	.286	5	–	13	.278
William & Mary	1	–	3	.250	10	–	11	.476
The Citadel	0	–	1	.000	2	–	3	.400
VMI	0	–	5	.000	0	–	14	.000
† Southern Conference Tournament winner

1943–44 Southwest Conference men's basketball standings
	Conf.				Overall
Team	W		L	PCT	W		L	PCT
Rice	11	–	1	.917	15	–	5	.750
Arkansas	11	–	1	.917	16	–	8	.667
Texas	6	–	6	.500	14	–	11	.560
SMU	6	–	6	.500	8	–	9	.471
TCU	6	–	6	.500	9	–	12	.429
Baylor	2	–	10	.167	6	–	12	.333
Texas A&M	0	–	12	.000	2	–	15	.118

=== Major independents ===
A total of 61 college teams played as major independents. Army (15–0) was undefeated. Bowling Green State (22–4), DePaul (22–4), Gonzaga (22–4), and Utah (22–4) finished with the most wins.

1943–44 NCAA men's basketball independents standings
	Conf.				Overall
Team	W		L	PCT	W		L	PCT
Army		–		–	15	–	0	1.000
Denison		–		–	18	–	2	.900
Bowling Green State		–		–	22	–	4	.846
DePaul		–		–	22	–	4	.846
Gonzaga		–		–	22	–	4	.846
Utah		–		–	22	–	4	.846
Miami (Ohio)		–		–	10	–	2	.833
Indiana State		–		–	17	–	4	.810
LIU		–		–	12	–	3	.800
Loyola (Calif.)		–		–	4	–	1	.800
Muhlenberg		–		–	20	–	5	.800
Western Michigan		–		–	15	–	4	.789
St. John's		–		–	18	–	5	.783
Bucknell		–		–	9	–	3	.750
Rochester (N.Y.)		–		–	11	–	4	.733
St. Joseph's		–		–	18	–	7	.720
Canisius		–		–	15	–	6	.714
Navy		–		–	10	–	4	.714
Catholic		–		–	17	–	7	.708
Lafayette		–		–	7	–	3	.700
Yale		–		–	14	–	6	.700
Colgate		–		–	11	–	5	.688
Pacific		–		–	13	–	6	.684
Marshall		–		–	15	–	7	.682
Valparaiso		–		–	17	–	8	.680
Akron		–		–	10	–	5	.667
Detroit		–		–	13	–	7	.650
Washington & Jefferson		–		–	11	–	6	.647
St. Francis (NY)		–		–	10	–	6	.625
Temple		–		–	14	–	9	.609
BYU		–		–	3	–	2	.600
Western Kentucky State		–		–	13	–	9	.591
Pepperdine		–		–	20	–	14	.588
Virginia		–		–	11	–	8	.579
Marquette		–		–	8	–	6	.571
Ohio		–		–	9	–	7	.563
Loyola (Md.)		–		–	15	–	12	.556
Cincinnati		–		–	6	–	5	.545
Penn State		–		–	8	–	7	.533
Notre Dame		–		–	10	–	9	.526
La Salle		–		–	8	–	8	.500
Louisville		–		–	10	–	10	.500
NYU		–		–	7	–	7	.500
Pittsburgh		–		–	7	–	7	.500
Saint Mary's		–		–	5	–	5	.500
Villanova		–		–	9	–	11	.450
Delaware		–		–	7	–	9	.438
Holy Cross		–		–	6	–	8	.429
San Francisco		–		–	8	–	11	.421
West Virginia		–		–	8	–	11	.421
Brown		–		–	10	–	14	.417
CCNY		–		–	6	–	11	.353
Brooklyn		–		–	6	–	14	.300
Toledo		–		–	5	–	13	.278
Denver		–		–	6	–	18	.250
Lehigh		–		–	4	–	12	.250
Rider		–		–	3	–	12	.200
Tennessee Tech		–		–	3	–	13	.188
Montana		–		–	2	–	10	.167
Harvard		–		–	2	–	12	.143
Northern Colorado		–		–	1	–	13	.071

== Post-season tournaments ==
=== NCAA tournament ===
==== Semifinals & final ====
National semifinals
Dartmouth	60
Ohio State	53
Iowa State	31
Utah	40

National Final
Dartmouth	40
Utah	42

=== National Invitation tournament ===
==== Semifinals & finals ====
Semifinals
Oklahoma A&M	38
DePaul	41
Kentucky	45
St. John's	48

Finals
DePaul	39
St. John's	47
Third place
Oklahoma A&M 29	29
Kentucky	45

== Awards ==
=== Consensus All-American teams ===
Consensus First Team
Player	Position	Class	Team
Bob Brannum	C	Sophomore	Kentucky
Audley Brindley	F	Sophomore	Dartmouth
Otto Graham	F	Senior	Northwestern
Leo Klier	F	Junior	Notre Dame
Bob Kurland	C	Sophomore	Oklahoma A&M
George Mikan	C	Sophomore	DePaul
Allie Paine	G	Junior	Oklahoma

Consensus Second Team
Player	Position	Class	Team
Bob Dille	F	Sophomore	Valparaiso
Arnie Ferrin	F	Freshman	Utah
Don Grate	G	Junior	Ohio State
Dale Hall	F	Junior	Army
Bill Henry	C	Junior	Rice
Dick Triptow	G	Senior	DePaul

=== Major player of the year awards ===
- Helms Player of the Year: George Mikan, DePaul
- Sporting News Player of the Year: Dale Hall, Army

=== Other major awards ===
- NIT/Haggerty Award (Top player in New York City metro area): Dick McGuire, St. John's

== Coaching changes ==
A number of teams changed coaches during the season and after it ended.

Team	Former Coach	Interim Coach	New Coach	Reason
Cincinnati	Robert Reuss		Ray Farnham	
The Citadel	Ben Clemons		Ernest Wehman	
Dartmouth	Earl Brown		Osborne Cowles	Cowles returned from World War II.
Delaware	Edmund Prince		William Murray	
Denver	Art Quinlan		Cliff Rock	
Drake	Bill Easton		Vee Freen	
Gonzaga	Charles Henry		Eugene Wozny	
Kansas State	Cliff Rock		Fitz Knorr	Rock left to coach at Denver.
Louisville	Harold Church & Walter Casey		Bernard Hickman	
Loyola (Md.)	Lefty Reitz		Albert Barthelme	
LSU	Dale Morey		Jesse Fatherree	
Maine	Samuel Sezak		William C. Kenyon	
Minnesota	Carl Nordly		Weston Mitchell	
Montana	Ed Buzzetti		George Dahlberg	
New Mexico	George White		Woody Clements	
North Carolina	Bill Lange		Ben Carnevale	
Notre Dame	Moose Krause		Clem Crowe	
Oregon	Howard Hobson		John A. Warren	
Saint Mary's	James Phelan		Clarence Anderson	
SMU	James Stewart		Roy Baccus	
South Carolina	Henry Findley		John D. McMillan	
Toledo	Burl Friddle		Rollie Boldt	
Tulsa	Woody West		Paul Alyea	
USC	Ernie Holbrook		Bobby Muth	
Vanderbilt	Smokey Harper		Garland Morrow	
Virginia Tech	Herbert McEver		George S. Proctor	
West Virginia	Harry Lothes		John Brickles	
