= List of Minnesota Golden Gophers men's basketball head coaches =

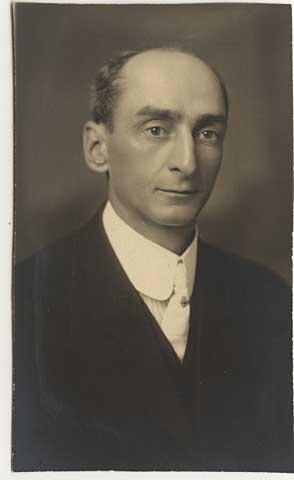
L. J. Cooke, the winningest head coach in Golden Gophers men's basketball history.

The following is a list of Minnesota Golden Gophers men's basketball head coaches. There have been 18 head coaches of the Golden Gophers in their 129-season history.

Minnesota's current head coach is Niko Medved. He was hired as the Golden Gophers' head coach in March 2025.

No.	Tenure	Coach	Years	Record	Pct.
–	1894–1896	No coach	2	3–5	.375
1	1896–1924	L. J. Cooke	28	250–135–2	.649
2	1924–1927	Harold Taylor	3	19–30	.388
3	1927–1942; 1945–1948	Dave MacMillan	18	196–156	.557
4	1942–1944	Carl Nordly	2	17–23	.425
5	1944–1945	Weston Mitchell	1	8–13	.381
6	1948–1959	Osborne Cowles	11	147–93	.613
7	1959–1968	John Kundla	9	110–105	.512
8	1968–1970	Bill Fitch	2	25–23	.521
9	1970–1971	George Hanson	1	11–13	.458
10	1971–1975	Bill Musselman	4	69–32	.683
11	1975–1986 (Note: Dutcher resigned on January 25, 1986. Jimmy Williams served as interim head coach for the remainder of the 1985–86 season.)	Jim Dutcher	11	190–113	.627
12	1986*	Jimmy Williams	1	2–9	.182
13	1986–1999 (Note: Minnesota vacated all results from 1993 through 1999. Haskins' on-court record is 241–168 (.589).)	Clem Haskins	13	111–100	.526
14	1999–2006 (Note: Monson resigned on November 30, 2006. Jim Molinari served as interim head coach for the remainder of the 2006–07 season.)	Dan Monson	8	118–106	.527
15	2006–2007*	Jim Molinari	1	7–17	.292
16	2007–2013	Tubby Smith	6	124–81	.605
17	2013–2021	Richard Pitino	8	141–123	.534
18	2021–2025	Ben Johnson	4	56–71	.441
19	2025–present	Niko Medved	1	0–0	–
Totals		19 coaches	133 seasons	1,604–1,248–2	.562
Records updated through end of 2024–25 season * - Denotes interim head coach. Source
