= 1943–44 Ohio Bobcats men's basketball team =

American college basketball season

1943–44 Ohio Bobcats men's basketball
- Conference: Independent
- Record: 9–7
- Head coach: Dutch Trautwein (6th season)
- Home arena: Men's Gymnasium

The 1943–44 Ohio Bobcats men's basketball team represented Ohio University in the college basketball season of 1943–44. The team was coached by Dutch Trautwein and played their home games at the Men's Gymnasium. They finished the season 9–7 .

== Schedule ==
| Date time, TV | Rank^{#} | Opponent^{#} | Result | Record | Site (attendance) city, state |
Regular Season
| | | Rio Grande | W 64–28 | 1–0 | Men's Gymnasium; Athens, OH |
| | | at Bowling Green | L 47–69 | 1–1 | |
| | | at Toledo | L 46–48 | 1–2 | |
| | | Ohio Wesleyan | W 40–33 | 2–2 | Men's Gymnasium; Athens, OH |
| | | at Miami | L 30–46 | 2–3 | Withrow Court; Oxford, OH |
| | | at Wittenberg | W 64–35 | 3–3 | |
| January 15 | | Cincinnati | L 40–41 | 3–4 | Men's Gymnasium; Athens, OH |
| | | at Denison | L 49–66 | 3–5 | |
| | | Wittenberg | W 58–42 | 4–5 | Men's Gymnasium; Athens, OH |
| | | at Otterbein | W 59–53 | 5–5 | |
| | | Muskingum | W 61–41 | 6–5 | Men's Gymnasium; Athens, OH |
| February 5 | | at Cincinnati | W 34–32 | 7–5 | Schmidlapp Gymnasium; Cincinnati, OH |
| | | at Ohio Wesleyan | W 43–34 | 8–5 | |
| | | Denison | L 40–48 | 8–6 | Men's Gymnasium; Athens, OH |
| | | Otterbein | W 62–47 | 9–6 | Men's Gymnasium; Athens, OH |
| | | at Kentucky | L 35–51 | 9–7 | Alumni Gymnasium; Lexington, KY |
*Non-conference game. ^{#}Rankings from AP Poll. (#) Tournament seedings in parentheses. All times are in Eastern Time.
