= Brunotte =

Brunotte is a surname. Notable people with the surname include:

- Gary Brunotte (born 1948), American musician
- Heinz Brunotte (1896–1984), German Lutheran theologian
- Herm Brunotte (1921–2010), American basketball player
- Karl Gottfried Brunotte (born 1958), German classical composer and music philosopher
