= John Rinka =

American basketball player

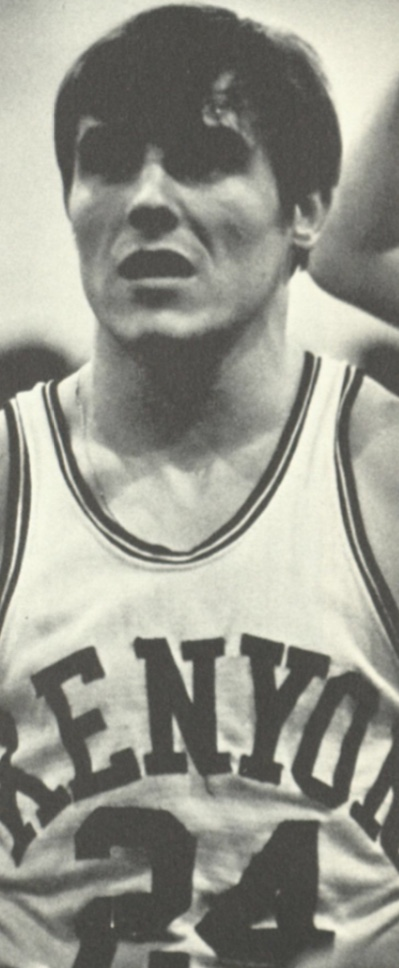
- Rinka from the 1970 Reveille

Personal information
- Born: October 4, 1948 (age 78) Milwaukee, Wisconsin, U.S.
- Listed height: 5 ft 9 in (1.75 m)

Career information
- High school: Shorewood (Shorewood, Wisconsin)
- College: Kenyon (1966–1970)
- NBA draft: 1970: 7th round, 118th overall pick
- Drafted by: Milwaukee Bucks
- Position: Shooting guard

Career highlights
- Frances Pomeroy Naismith Award (1970); 3× NCAA Small College All-American (1968–1970); 3× OAC Player of the Year (1968–1970); 4× First-team All-OAC (1967–1970); No. 24 retired by Kenyon Lords
- Stats at Basketball Reference

John Rinka (born October 4, 1948) is an American former college basketball player best known for his high-scoring offensive ability and accurate jump shot while at Kenyon College from 1966 to 1970. A 5 ft 9 in (1.75 m) shooting guard, Rinka is in the National Collegiate Athletic Association (NCAA) top ten in all-time scoring despite playing before the advent of the three–point line and the shot clock. He once scored 69 points in a game, which is tied for the 21st-highest single game output in NCAA history; his 41.0 points per game average in 1969–70 as well as his 3,251 career points are also the eighth-highest average and total, respectively.

== Kenyon College ==
Rinka, a Milwaukee, Wisconsin native, did not get serious consideration from any Division I colleges coming out of Shorewood High School due to his size. Kenyon College, a Division III school in Ohio, was his only viable option. From 1966 to 1970, Rinka played for Kenyon in the Ohio Athletic Conference (OAC) and set nearly every school and conference scoring record. He was a four-time first-team OAC selection, three-time conference player of the year, a three-time All-American and one-time Academic All-American, and he led the nation in free throw percentage (234-of-263; 89%) in 1969–70. As a senior, he was the first non-Division I recipient of the Frances Pomeroy Naismith Award, which was given to the top men's college basketball player under 6 ft 0 in (1.83 m) tall.

== Later life ==
He was drafted by the Milwaukee Bucks of the National Basketball Association (NBA) in 1970 in the seventh round, but because he was leery of playing at home and because the American Basketball Association (ABA) utilized a three–point line, Rinka tried out for the ABA's Utah Stars instead. He was the Stars' final cut, and the Bucks won the NBA Finals in what would have been Rinka's rookie season.

Rinka would forgo any further aspirations of becoming a professional basketball player and opted to become a teacher and to coach basketball instead. He served as an assistant coach and assistant athletic director at Brandeis University and moved from school to school, before landing in Wilmington, North Carolina, to teach at John T. Hoggard High School. Over his teaching career, he garnered three Teacher of the Year awards in three different school districts. He was the initial coordinator and teacher of the AVID program that helped 97 percent of the program's first generation students receive admission into college.

On May 20, 2006, Rinka was inducted into the Ohio Basketball Hall of Fame as part of its inaugural class. Among a larger group, he was inducted with players Oscar Robertson (his boyhood idol), John Havlicek, Clark Kellogg, Jerry Lucas and Bob Knight. In 2016, Rinka was awarded an Honorary Doctorate of Humane letters from Kenyon College for his work in education. In 2017, Rinka was a member of the inaugural class of the Small College Hall of Fame, along with Phil Jackson, Lucious Jackson, Dick Barnett and Travis Grant.
