= Ed Kelleher =

American basketball coach (1894–1945)

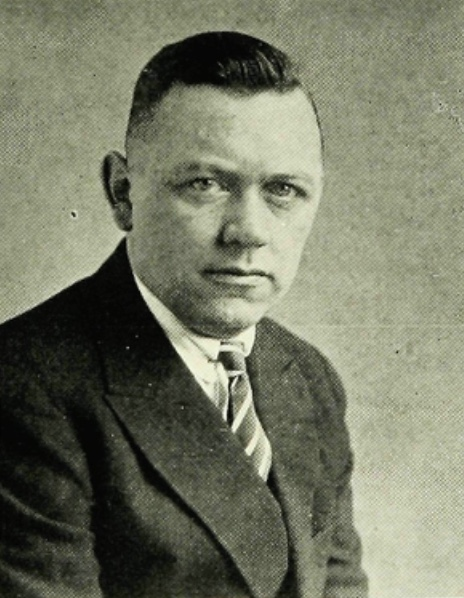
- Kelleher from the 1925 Maroon

Biographical details
- Born: June 29, 1894; New York City, New York, U.S.
- Died: July 19, 1945 (aged 51); Munich, Germany
- Education: Niagara University

Coaching career (HC unless noted)
- 1921–1922: St. John's
- 1923–1934: Fordham
- 1938–1943: Fordham
- 1943–1945: Army

Administrative career (AD unless noted)
- 1942–1944: NABC (president)

Head coaching record
- Overall: 257–105
- Tournaments: 1–2 (NIT)

Accomplishments and honors

Championships
- Helms National (1944); 3 Eastern (1927–1929)

Awards
- Fordham Hall of Fame (1972)

Edward Ambrose Kelleher (June 29, 1894 – July 19, 1945) was an American college basketball head coach. He served as the head coach at St. John's University, Fordham University, and the United States Military Academy and amassed an overall career record of 257 wins and 105 losses.

During his tenure at Fordham, Kelleher installed a fast-pace offense that prioritized high-scoring games modeled after the west coast style of play (the east coast played a slower, more defensive-oriented brand of basketball). He coached the famous "Wonder Fives", the teams between 1924 and 1929 who lost only nine total games. During a three-year stretch between 1926–27 and 1928–29, his Rams went 48–4. They were named "Eastern champions" all three years. Kelleher's other highlights as the Rams coach include coaching their first two All-Americans, Frank Dougherty and Bob Mullens, as well as guiding the school to its first-ever postseason tournament. In 1942–43, his last season at Fordham, he led the Rams to a fourth-place finish in the 1943 National Invitation Tournament.

When Fordham temporarily dropped their basketball program due to World War II, Kelleher signed a short-term contract with the Military Academy to be their head coach. The plan was to return to Fordham once they re-commissioned a basketball team. In his first season at Army, his team finished the season with a 15–0 record and was retroactively named the national champion by the Helms Athletic Foundation. In addition, this team was retroactively listed as the top team of the season by the Premo-Porretta Power Poll. Then, in 1944–45, his Army squad went 14–1, giving his two-year head coaching tenure at Army an overall record of 29–1. He coached Dale Hall, a consensus All-American who later became the head men's basketball coach at New Hampshire and the head football coach at Army. He also coached Edward C. Christl, for whom Army's home basketball arena is named, as well as future four-star general John J. Hennessey.

After the 1944–45 season ended, Kelleher went to Europe as a civilian with the United States Armed Forces. He died on July 19, 1945, in Munich, Germany, of a heart attack. He is buried at Lorraine American Cemetery in Saint-Avold, France.

Kelleher is memorialized by the Edward A. Kelleher Trophy, which is awarded each year to the winner of the National Invitation Tournament.

== Head coaching record ==
Record table
Season	Team	Overall	Conference	Standing	Postseason
St. John's Redmen (Independent) (1921–1922)
1921–22	St. John's	10–11			
St. John's:		10–11 (.476)			
Fordham Rams (Independent) (1923–1933)
1923–24	Fordham	12–8			
1924–25	Fordham	18–1			
1925–26	Fordham	18–4			
1926–27	Fordham	20–2			
1927–28	Fordham	16–4			
1928–29	Fordham	18–2			
1929–30	Fordham	13–5			
1930–31	Fordham	14–5			
1931–32	Fordham	10–8			
1932–33	Fordham	7–11			
Fordham Rams (Metropolitan New York Conference) (1933–1934, 1938–1939)
1933–34	Fordham	11–5	1–4	8th	
1938–39	Fordham	10–8	10–8	7th	
Fordham Rams (Independent) (1939–1942)
1939–40	Fordham	11–8			
1940–41	Fordham	12–9			
1941–42	Fordham	12–7			
Fordham Rams (Metropolitan New York Conference) (1942–1943)
1942–43	Fordham	16–6	4–2	3rd	NIT Fourth Place
Fordham:		218–93 (.476)	15–14 (.517)		
Army Cadets (Independent) (1943–1945)
1943–44	Army	15–0			Helms National Champion
1944–45	Army	14–1			
Army:		29–1 (.967)			
Total:		257–105 (.710)			
National champion Postseason invitational champion Conference regular season champion Conference regular season and conference tournament champion Division regular season champion Division regular season and conference tournament champion Conference tournament champion
