= Wally Borrevik =

American basketball player

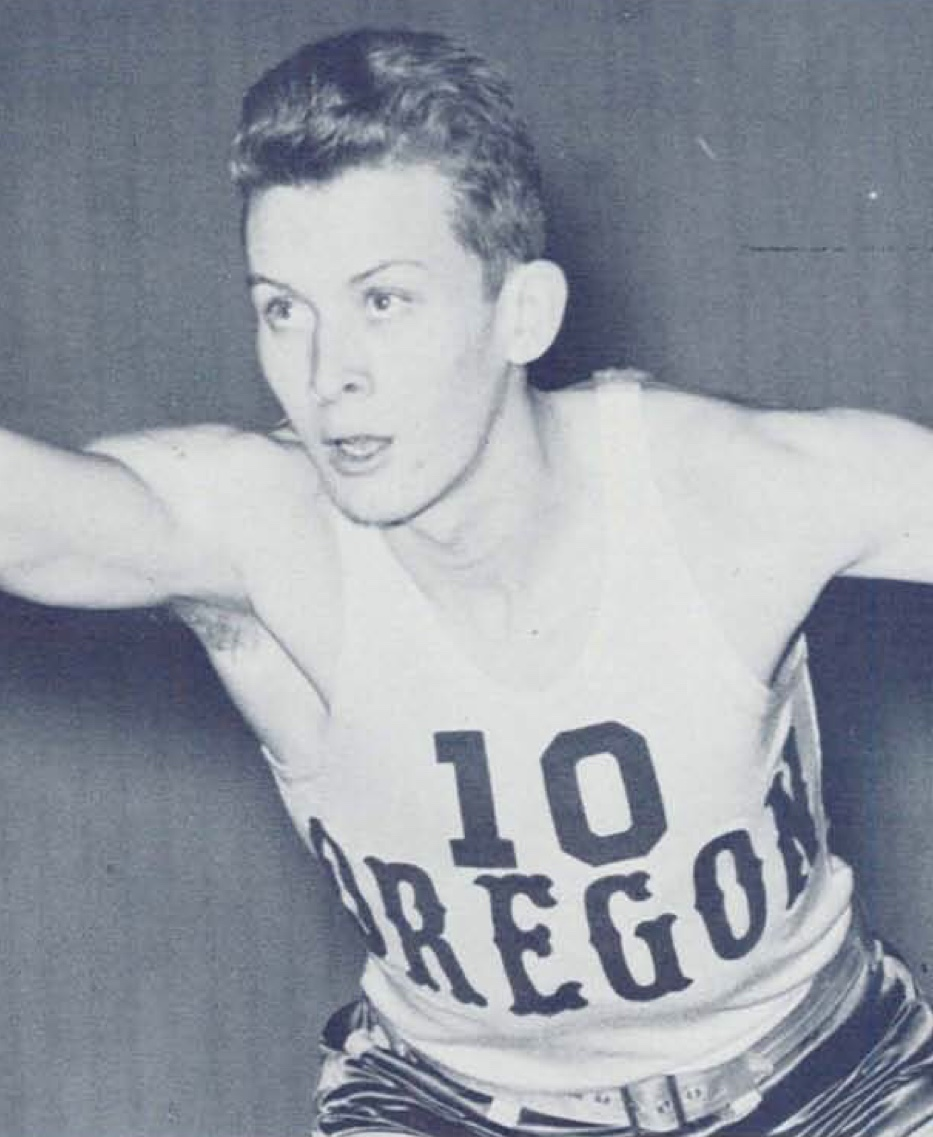
- Borrevik from the 1944 Oregana

Personal information
- Born: November 14, 1921 Silverton, Oregon, U.S.
- Died: December 9, 1988 (aged 67) Coos Bay, Oregon, U.S.
- Listed height: 6 ft 8 in (2.03 m)
- Listed weight: 205 lb (93 kg)

Career information
- High school: Reedsport (Reedsport, Oregon)
- College: Oregon (1940–1941, 1942–1944)
- Position: Center

Career history
- 1947: Anderson Packers
- 1947: Flint Dow A.C.'s
- 1947–1948: Tri-Cities Blackhawks

Career highlights
- Third-team All-American – Converse (1944)

Wallace Bernard Borrevik (November 14, 1921 – December 9, 1988) was an American professional basketball player. He played in the National Basketball League for the Anderson Duffey Packers, Flint Dow A.C.'s, and Tri-Cities Blackhawks during the 1947–48 season.
