= Ward Williams =

American basketball player

Personal information
- Born: June 26, 1923 Colfax, Indiana, U.S.
- Died: December 17, 2005 (aged 82) Greenville, South Carolina, U.S.
- Listed height: 6 ft 4 in (1.93 m)
- Listed weight: 195 lb (88 kg)

Career information
- High school: Colfax (Colfax, Indiana)
- College: Indiana (1942–1943, 1946–1948)
- BAA draft: 1948: 1st round, 8th overall pick
- Drafted by: Fort Wayne Pistons
- Playing career: 1948–1949
- Position: Forward
- Number: 25

Career history
- 1948–1949: Fort Wayne Pistons

Career BAA statistics
- Points: 215 (4.1 ppg)
- Assists: 82 (1.5 apg)
- Stats at NBA.com
- Stats at Basketball Reference

Ward Milton Williams (June 26, 1923 – December 17, 2005) was an American professional basketball player. Ward was selected in the first round (8th overall) in the 1948 BAA Draft by the Fort Wayne Pistons. He played for the Pistons in 1948–49 and appeared in 53 games.

== BAA career statistics ==
Legend
GP	Games played
FG%	Field-goal percentage
FT%	Free-throw percentage
APG	Assists per game
PPG	Points per game

=== Regular season ===
Year	Team	GP	FG%	FT%	APG	PPG
1948–49	Fort Wayne	53	.237	.750	1.5	4.1
Career		53	.237	.750	1.5	4.1
