= 1944 NCAA Men's Basketball All-Americans =

- Awarded for: 1943–44 NCAA men's basketball season

The consensus 1944 College Basketball All-American team, as determined by aggregating the results of four major All-American teams. To earn "consensus" status, a player must win honors from a majority of the following teams: the Helms Athletic Foundation, Converse, The Sporting News, and Pic Magazine.

== 1944 Consensus All-America team ==
Consensus First Team
Player	Position	Class	Team
Bob Brannum	C	Sophomore	Kentucky
Audley Brindley	F	Sophomore	Dartmouth
Otto Graham	F	Senior	Northwestern
Leo Klier	F	Junior	Notre Dame
Bob Kurland	C	Sophomore	Oklahoma A&M
George Mikan	C	Sophomore	DePaul
Allie Paine	G	Junior	Oklahoma

Consensus Second Team
Player	Position	Class	Team
Bob Dille	F	Sophomore	Valparaiso
Arnie Ferrin	F	Freshman	Utah
Don Grate	G	Junior	Ohio State
Dale Hall	F	Junior	Army
Bill Henry	C	Junior	Rice
Dick Triptow	G	Senior	DePaul

== Individual All-America teams ==
All-America Team
All-America Team	First team		Second team		Third team	
All-America Team	Player	School	Player	School	Player	School
Helms	Bob Brannum	Kentucky	No second or third team			
Helms	Audley Brindley	Dartmouth	No second or third team			
Helms	Bob Dille	Valparaiso	No second or third team			
Helms	Arnie Ferrin	Utah	No second or third team			
Helms	Otto Graham	Northwestern	No second or third team			
Helms	Dale Hall	Army	No second or third team			
Helms	Bill Henry	Rice	No second or third team			
Helms	Bob Kurland	Oklahoma A&M	No second or third team			
Helms	George Mikan	DePaul	No second or third team			
Helms	Allie Paine	Oklahoma	No second or third team			
Converse	Audley Brindley	Dartmouth	Bob Brannum	Kentucky	Wally Borrevik	Oregon
Converse	Arnie Ferrin	Utah	Otto Graham	Northwestern	Hy Gotkin	St. John's
Converse	Leo Klier	Notre Dame	Don Grate	Ohio State	Dick Ives	Iowa
Converse	George Mikan	DePaul	Bob Kurland	Oklahoma A&M	Bill Kotsores	St. John's
Converse	Allie Paine	Oklahoma	Dick Triptow	DePaul	Bill Morris	Washington
Pic Magazine	Otto Graham	Northwestern	Bob Brannum	Kentucky	William Chandler	Marquette
Pic Magazine	Don Grate	Ohio State	Audley Brindley	Dartmouth	Charles Haag	Purdue
Pic Magazine	Leo Klier	Notre Dame	Francis Crossin	Pennsylvania	Dale Hall	Army
Pic Magazine	George Mikan	DePaul	Bob Dille	Valparaiso	Bill Henry	Rice
Pic Magazine	Allie Paine	Oklahoma	Bob Kurland	Oklahoma A&M	Dick Ives	Iowa
Pic Magazine			Dick Triptow	DePaul		
Sporting News	Bob Brannum	Kentucky	David Danner	Iowa	Herm Brunotte	Canisius
Sporting News	Audley Brindley	Dartmouth	Leo Klier	Notre Dame	Ernie Calverley	Rhode Island
Sporting News	Otto Graham	Northwestern	Bob Kurland	Oklahoma A&M	John Cawood	Western Michigan
Sporting News	Dale Hall	Army	Dick McGuire	St. John's/Dartmouth	Bill Henry	Rice
Sporting News	George Mikan	DePaul	William Morris	Washington	Dick Triptow	DePaul

== See also ==
- 1943–44 NCAA men's basketball season
