= Wilbur Stalcup =

American basketball coach and college athletics administrator (1910–1972)

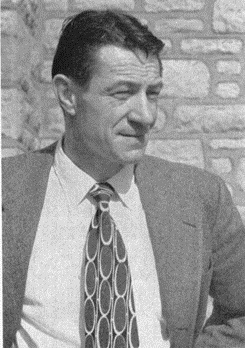
- Stalcup, c. 1952

Biographical details
- Born: February 13, 1910
- Died: April 21, 1972 (aged 62); Columbia, Missouri, U.S.

Playing career

Football
- 1928–1931: Northwest Missouri State

Basketball
- 1929–1932: Northwest Missouri State

Coaching career (HC unless noted)

Football
- 1932: Jackson HS (MO)

Basketball
- 1932–1933: Jackson HS (MO)
- 1933–1943: Northwest Missouri State
- 1946–1962: Missouri

Administrative career (AD unless noted)
- 1971–1972: Missouri

Head coaching record
- Overall: 332–236 (college basketball)

Accomplishments and honors

Championships
- MIAA regular season (1940)

Wilbur Neil "Sparky" Stalcup (February 13, 1910 – April 21, 1972) was an American basketball coach and college athletics administrator. He served as the head basketball coach at Northwest Missouri State Teacher's College—now known as Northwest Missouri State University—from 1933 to 1943 and at the University of Missouri from 1946 to 1962, compiling a career college basketball record of 332–236. Stalcup was also the athletic director at Missouri from 1971 until his death in 1972.

== Early life and playing career ==
Stalcup grew up in Oregon, Missouri, where he played for the 1928 team that won the Missouri State High School championship at a time when there were no size divisions for high school basketball. The Oregon team made it to the quarterfinals of the National Interscholastic Basketball Tournament at the University of Chicago. During the run Oregon did not have a gymnasium and practiced on an outdoor court and occasionally inside a Methodist church. There were only 10 people from the school body of 100 who played.

Stalcup attended Northwest Missouri State Teacher's College and played for Henry Iba. He was an Iba's 1932 team member that lost a title game in the Amateur Athletic Union national championship.

== Coaching career ==
After graduating from Northwest Missouri State in 1932, Stalcup began his coaching career that fall as head coach at Jackson High School in Jackson, Missouri.

=== Northwest Missouri State ===
Following one year at Jackson High School, Stalcup returned to Northwest Missouri State to succeed Iba as head basketball coach. With a 138–57 record, Stalcup is second only to Iba in won-loss percentage. His only Missouri Intercollegiate Athletic Association was in 1939–40 when his team was 17–0 in conference play and 20–1 overall. His teams had winning records in eight of his nine seasons.

=== Missouri ===
Following a hiatus on basketball during World War II, Stalcup moved to Missouri. He compiled a 194–179 record at Missouri. His team won no conference championships, although they did win two Big Seven Holiday Tournaments. Among his players was Norm Stewart. He had the most wins in the school history until Stewart eclipsed him. He was president of the National Association of Basketball Coaches in 1961–62. He was color commentator on basketball broadcasts after leaving coaching and was the athletic director at the university when he died. The Stalcup Room in the Mizzou Arena is named for him.

== Head coaching record ==
=== College basketball ===
Record table
Season	Team	Overall	Conference	Standing	Postseason
Northwest Missouri State Bearcats (Missouri Intercollegiate Athletic Association) (1933–1943)
1933–34	Northwest Missouri State	8–6			
1934–35	Northwest Missouri State	10–8			
1935–36	Northwest Missouri State	11–7			
1936–37	Northwest Missouri State	13–4			
1937–38	Northwest Missouri State	15–6			
1938–39	Northwest Missouri State	11–7			
1939–40	Northwest Missouri State	20–1		1st	
1940–41	Northwest Missouri State	18–5			
1941–42	Northwest Missouri State	14–6			
1942–43	Northwest Missouri State	18–7			
Northwest Missouri State:		138–57			
Missouri Tigers (Big Six / Big Seven / Big Eight Conference) (1946–1962)
1946–47	Missouri	15–10	6–4	2nd	
1947–48	Missouri	14–10	7–5	T–2nd	
1948–49	Missouri	11–13	6–6	4th	
1949–50	Missouri	14–10	4–8	6th	
1950–51	Missouri	16–8	8–4	T–2nd	
1951–52	Missouri	14–10	6–6	3rd	
1952–53	Missouri	11–9	6–6	3rd	
1953–54	Missouri	11–10	6–6	3rd	
1954–55	Missouri	16–5	9–3	2nd	
1955–56	Missouri	15–7	8–4	T–2nd	
1956–57	Missouri	10–13	4–8	6th	
1957–58	Missouri	9–13	3–9	T–6th	
1958–59	Missouri	6–19	3–11	8th	
1959–60	Missouri	12–13	5–9	6th	
1960–61	Missouri	11–13	7–7	4th	
1961–62	Missouri	9–16	3–11	T–7th	
Missouri:		194–179	91–107		
Total:		332–236			
National champion Postseason invitational champion Conference regular season champion Conference regular season and conference tournament champion Division regular season champion Division regular season and conference tournament champion Conference tournament champion
