= Army Black Knights men's basketball =

American Army men's basketball team

2026–27 Army Black Knights men's basketball team
- Institution: United States Military Academy
- Head coach: Kevin Kuwik (4th season)
- Location: West Point, New York
- Arena: Christl Arena (capacity: 5,043)
- Conference: Patriot
- Nickname: Black Knights
- Colors: Black, gold, and gray

Pre-tournament Helms national champions
- 1944

Uniforms
Home	Away

The Army Black Knights men's basketball team represents the United States Military Academy in National Collegiate Athletic Association (NCAA) Division I college basketball. Army currently competes as a member of the Patriot League and plays its home games at Christl Arena in West Point, New York. The Black Knights are the oldest college basketball team in the United States to have never appeared in the NCAA Division I men's basketball tournament.

== History ==
Bob Knight, the coach with the most wins in NCAA men's basketball history, began his head coaching career at Army from 1965 to 1971 before moving on to Indiana. One of Knight's players at Army was Mike Krzyzewski, who later was head coach at Army before moving on to Duke and becoming the winningest men's basketball coach in NCAA Division I history.

Since its inception in 1903, Army retrospectively has been awarded a national championship, has made eight NIT appearances, has refused two NCAA tournament invitations, in 1944 and 1968, and has an overall 49.7% winning percentage.

The Black Knights were retroactively ranked as the nation's top college team by Premo-Porretta for 1923 season and were retroactively listed by the Helms Athletic Foundation as the national champion for 1944, when they went undefeated (15–0), but declined an invitation to the NCAA tournament due to World War II. While the NCAA lists the historical Helms selections for reference, neither the Helms title nor the Premo-Porretta ranking are officially recognized as national championships. The 1944 squad was captained by Edward C. Christl, who earned a posthumous Distinguished Service Cross during World War II and for whom the Black Knights' home arena is named.

Head coach Bob Knight turned down the 1968 NCAA tournament invitation in favor of the NIT, because he believed the Black Knights had a better chance of winning the NIT with Lew Alcindor and UCLA playing in the NCAA tournament. Further, Madison Square Garden was close enough to West Point to allow the Corps of Cadets to attend the games, and Army had participated in the NIT seven times in 10 years, including four of Knight's five seasons as head coach. They would go on to lose their first game of the 1968 NIT to Notre Dame.

As of 2025, the Black Knights are one of only three active Division I programs that were playing college basketball in 1939—when the inaugural NCAA tournament was held—but have never participated in the NCAA Division I men's basketball tournament. Army shares this distinction with William & Mary and The Citadel. (St. Francis Brooklyn was also part of this group before it discontinued athletics in 2023.)

The Black Knights have played in the National Invitational Tournament eight times and also played in the 2016 edition of the CollegeInsider.com Postseason Tournament (CIT), their first appearance in a postseason tournament in 38 years, losing to NJIT in the first round.

== Seasons ==
In 119 seasons, the Black Knights have a record of 1262–1276.

== Postseason results ==
=== National Invitation Tournament ===
The Black Knights have appeared in the National Invitation Tournament (NIT) eight times. Their combined record is 13–10.

Year	Round	Opponent	Result
1961	First Round	Temple	L 66–79
1964	First Round; Quarterfinals; Semifinals; 3rd Place Game	St. Bonaventure; Duquesne; Bradley; NYU	W 64–62; W 67–65; L 52–67; W 60–59
1965	First Round; Quarterfinals; Semifinals; 3rd Place Game	St. Louis; Western Kentucky; St. John's; NYU	W 70–66; W 58–54; L 60–67; W 75–74
1966	First Round; Quarterfinals; Semifinals; 3rd Place Game	Manhattan; San Francisco; BYU; Villanova	W 71–66; W 80–63; L 60–66; L 65–76
1968	First Round	Notre Dame	L 58–62
1969	First Round; Quarterfinals; Semifinals; 3rd Place Game	Wyoming; South Carolina; Boston College; Tennessee	W 51–49; W 59–45; L 61–73; L 52–64
1970	First Round; Quarterfinals; Semifinals; 3rd Place Game	Cincinnati; Manhattan; St. John's; LSU	W 72–67; W 77–72; L 59–60; W 75–68
1978	First Round	Rutgers	L 70–72

=== CollegeInsider.com tournament ===
The Black Knights have appeared in one CollegeInsider.com Postseason Tournament (CIT). Their record is 0–1.

Year	Round	Opponent	Result
2016	First Round	NJIT	L 65–79

=== CBI results ===
The Black Knights have appeared in two College Basketball Invitational (CBI). Their record is 1–2.

Year	Round	Opponent	Result
2021	First Round	Bellarmine	L 67–77
2025	First Round; Quarterfinals	Elon; Florida Gulf Coast	W 83–78; L 65–68

== Head coaches ==
Coach	Years	Record
Joseph Stilwell	1902–04; 1908–11; 1913–14	41–14
No coach	1904–06	10–8
Harry Fisher	1906–07	9–5
B.H. Koehler	1907–08	9–3
Harvey Higley	1911–13	19–6
Jacob Devers	1914–16	16–9
Arthur Conrad	1916–17	3–8
Ivens Jones	1917–19	11–9
Joseph O'Shea	1919–21	30–7
Harry Fisher	1921–23; 1924–25	46–5
Van Vleit	1923–24	16–2
Ernest Blood	1925–26	11–6
Leo Novak	1926–39	126–56
Valentine Lentz	1939–43	31–31
Edward Kelleher	1943–45	29–1
Stewart Holcomb	1945–47	18–13
John Mauer	1947–51	33–35
Elmer Ripley	1951–53	19–17
Bob Vanatta	1953–54	15–7
Orvis Sigler	1954–58	39–47
George Hunter	1958–63	63–48
Tates Locke	1963–65	40–15
Bob Knight	1965–71	102–50
Dan Dougherty	1971–75	31–66
Mike Krzyzewski	1975–80	73–59
Pete Gaudet	1980–82	12–41
Les Wothke	1982–90	92–135
Tom Miller	1990–92	10–46
Mike Conners	1992–93	4–22
Dino Gaudio	1993–97	36–72
Pat Harris	1997–2002	42–96
Jim Crews	2002–09	59–140
Zach Spiker	2009–16	102–112
Jimmy Allen	2016–2023	98–112
Kevin Kuwik	2023–	0–0

== All-Americans ==
The following Army players were named NCAA Men's Basketball All-Americans:

- William Copthorne – 1910 (Helms Athletic Foundation)
- William Roberts – 1913 (Helms Athletic Foundation)
- Elmer Oliphant – 1915 (Helms Athletic Foundation)
- Gene Vidal – 1918 (Helms Athletic Foundation)
- Harry Wilson – 1927 (Helms Athletic Foundation)
- Dale Hall – 1944 (Consensus Second Team), 1945 (Consensus Second Team)
- Gary Winton – 1977 (AP Honorable Mention), 1978 (AP Honorable Mention)
- Kevin Houston – 1987 (NABC Third Team)

== Academic All-Americans ==
The following Army players were named Academic All-America:

- Mike Silliman – 1964
- John Ritch – 1965
- Robert Sherwin – 1972, 1973
- Steve Rothert – 1989

== Basketball Hall of Fame ==
The following Army players and coaches have been inducted into the Naismith Memorial Basketball Hall of Fame:

- Ernest Blood – 1960, former coach
- John Roosma – 1961, former player
- Elmer Ripley – 1972, former coach, inducted as a contributor
- Harry A. Fisher – 1973, former coach, inducted as a contributor
- Bob Knight – 1991, former coach
- Mike Krzyzewski – 2001, former coach and player, inducted as a coach

== Major awards ==
Eastern Collegiate Athletic Conference Award: Outstanding Scholar-Athlete of the Year

- John Ritch – 1965

Frances Pomeroy Naismith Award

- Robert Sherwin – 1973

Haggerty Award

- Kevin Houston – 1987

Metro Atlantic Athletic Conference Men's Basketball Player of the Year

- Randy Cozzens – 1985
- Kevin Houston – 1987

Metro Atlantic Athletic Conference Men's Basketball Coach of the Year

- Les Wothke – 1985

Patriot League Men's Basketball Coach of the Year

- Pat Harris – 2001–02
- Zach Spiker – 2012–13

Patriot League Men's Basketball Rookie of the Year

- David Ardayfio – 1990–91
- Alex Morris – 1992–93
- Kyle Wilson – 2012–13

Patriot League Men's Basketball Defensive Player of the Year

- Marcus Nelson – 2008–09
- Josh Caldwell - 2020-21
- Josh Caldwell - 2021-22
