= 1943–44 Iowa State Cyclones men's basketball team =

American college basketball season

1943–44 Iowa State Cyclones men's basketball

Big Six Champions

1944 NCAA basketball tournament, Final Four
- Conference: Big Six Conference
- Record: 14–4 (9–1 Big Six)
- Head coach: Louis Menze (16th season)
- Home arena: State Gymnasium

1943–44 Big Six Conference men's basketball standings
	Conf.				Overall
Team	W		L	PCT	W		L	PCT
Iowa State	9	–	1	.900	14	–	4	.778
Oklahoma	9	–	1	.900	15	–	8	.652
Kansas	5	–	5	.500	17	–	9	.654
Missouri	5	–	5	.500	10	–	9	.526
Kansas State	1	–	9	.100	7	–	15	.318
Nebraska	1	–	9	.100	2	–	13	.133

The 1943–44 Iowa State Cyclones men's basketball team represented Iowa State University during the 1943–44 NCAA men's basketball season. The Cyclones were coached by Louis Menze, who was in his sixteenth season with the team. They played their home games at the State Gymnasium in Ames, Iowa. The Cyclones qualified for the Final Four for the first time in school history, defeating Pepperdine in the NCAA Western Regional, before falling to Utah, 40–31. Initially, it was not known if Iowa State would be able to fulfill their role in the postseason tournament, but they were ultimately able to do so. Star player Price Brookfield joined the Cyclones mid-season through the naval training program at Iowa State.

== Roster ==
1943–44 Iowa State Cyclones men's basketball team
Players
Coaches

Pos.	#	Name	Height	Weight	Year	Hometown
	33	Price Brookfield	6 ft 4 in (1.93 m)	—
F		Rae Chisholm	6 ft 1 in (1.85 m)	—
		Bob Deck	5 ft 10 in (1.78 m)	—
F		James Felix	5 ft 11 in (1.8 m)	—
G		Earl Kelso	5 ft 11 in (1.8 m)	—		Rochester, New York
G		Lloyd Kester	5 ft 11 in (1.8 m)	—		Ames, Iowa
G		Darle Larson	5 ft 8 in (1.73 m)	—
		James Myers	5 ft 11 in (1.8 m)	—
G		Lyle Naylor	6 ft 0 in (1.83 m)	—
C		Don Nelson	6 ft 2 in (1.88 m)	—
C	21	Gene Oulman	6 ft 3 in (1.91 m)	—		Mason City, Iowa
G	20	Bob Sauer	6 ft 0 in (1.83 m)	—
C		Lee Schneider	6 ft 4 in (1.93 m)	—		Rock Island, Illinois
F	28	Ray Wehde	6 ft 1 in (1.85 m)	—		Holstein, Iowa
F	27	Roy Wehde	6 ft 1 in (1.85 m)	—		Holstein, Iowa

Head coach

- Louis Menze

Assistant coach(es)

Legend

- (C) Team captain
- (S) Suspended
- (I) Ineligible
- (W) Walk-on
- Injured
- Current redshirt

== Schedule ==
Date time, TV	Rank^{#}	Opponent^{#}	Result	Record	Site city, state
Regular season
December 4, 1943*; 7:30 pm		Iowa Pre-Flight	W 31–29	1–0	State Gymnasium; Ames, Iowa
December 18, 1943*; 8:00 pm		at Minnesota	L 28–31	1–1	Williams Arena; Minneapolis
December 31, 1943*; 7:30 pm		Drake; Iowa Big Four	W 43–20	2–1	State Gymnasium; Ames, Iowa
January 3, 1944		at Kansas State	W 42–33	3–1 (1–0)	Nichols Hall; Manhattan, Kansas
January 8, 1944		at Nebraska	W 56–24	4–1 (2–0)	Nebraska Coliseum; Lincoln, Nebraska
January 15, 1944*; 7:30 pm		Ottumwa Naval	W 60–37	5–1	State Gymnasium; Ames, Iowa
January 17, 1944*		at Iowa Pre-Flight	L 27–33	5–2	Iowa City, Iowa
January 22, 1944; 7:30 pm		Missouri	W 41–25	6–2 (3–0)	State Gymnasium; Ames, Iowa
January 29, 1944; 7:30 pm		Kansas	W 40–29	7–2 (4–0)	State Gymnasium; Ames, Iowa
February 5, 1944		at Oklahoma	W 41–39	8–2 (5–0)	OU Field House; Norman, Oklahoma
February 9, 1944*; 8:15 pm		at Drake	W 64–36	9–2	Drake Fieldhouse; Des Moines, Iowa
February 11, 1944; 7:30 pm		Kansas State	W 47–20	10–2 (6–0)	State Gymnasium; Ames, Iowa
February 14, 1944		Nebraska	W 58–35	11–2 (7–0)	State Gymnasium; Ames, Iowa
February 21, 1944		at Missouri	W 43–32	12–2 (8–0)	Brewer Fieldhouse; Columbia, Missouri
February 28, 1944; 7:15 pm		Oklahoma	L 30–44	12–3 (8–1)	State Gymnasium; Ames, Iowa
March 3, 1944		at Kansas	W 47–25	13–3 (9–1)	Hoch Auditorium; Lawrence, Kansas
Postseason
March 24, 1944; 9:30 pm		vs. Pepperdine; NCAA tournament West Regional semifinals	W 44–39	14–3	Municipal Auditorium (4,762); Kansas City, Missouri
March 25, 1944		vs. Utah; NCAA Tournament West Regional Finals (Final Four)	L 31–40	14–4	Municipal Auditorium (5,112); Kansas City, Missouri
*Non-conference game. ^{#}Rankings from AP poll. (#) Tournament seedings in parentheses. All times are in Central Time.
