= 1943–44 Cincinnati Bearcats men's basketball team =

American college basketball season

1943–44 Cincinnati Bearcats men's basketball
- Conference: Independent
- Record: 6–5
- Head coach: Bob Reuss (1st season)
- Home arena: Schmidlapp Gymnasium

The 1943–44 Cincinnati Bearcats men's basketball team represented the University of Cincinnati during the 1943–44 NCAA men's basketball season. The head coach was Bob Reuss, coaching his first season with the Bearcats. The team finished with an overall record of 6–5.

== Schedule ==
Date time, TV	Opponent	Result	Record	Site city, state
December 11	at Wilmington	W 49–34	1–0	Wilmington, OH
December 18	at Kentucky	L 30–58	1–1	Alumni Gymnasium; Lexington, KY
January 10	at Wilmington	W 46–21	2–1	Wilmington, OH
January 15	at Ohio	W 41–40	3–1	Men's Gymnasium; Athens, OH
January 22	at Marshall	L 49–55	3–2	Huntington, WV
January 28	at Miami (OH)	L 52–66	3–3	Withrow Court; Oxford, OH
January 31	at Wright Field	W 71–32	4–3	
February 5	Ohio	L 32–34	4–4	Schmidlapp Gymnasium; Cincinnati, OH
February 12	at Kentucky	L 34–38	4–5	Schmidlapp Gymnasium; Cincinnati, OH
February 16	Marshall	W 65–37	5–5	Schmidlapp Gymnasium; Cincinnati, OH
February 19	Wright Field	W 28–23	6–5	Schmidlapp Gymnasium; Cincinnati, OH
*Non-conference game. (#) Tournament seedings in parentheses.
