= 1943–44 UCLA Bruins men's basketball team =

American college basketball season

1943–44 UCLA Bruins men's basketball
- Conference: Pacific Coast Conference
- South
- Record: 10–10 (3–3 PCC)
- Head coach: Wilbur Johns (5th season)
- Assistant coach: Jack Montgomery
- Home arena: Men's Gym

1943–44 Pacific Coast Conference men's basketball standings
	Conf.				Overall
Team	W		L	PCT	W		L	PCT
North
Washington	15	–	1	.938	26	–	6	.813
Oregon	11	–	5	.688	16	–	10	.615
Idaho	5	–	11	.313	7	–	16	.304
Oregon State	5	–	11	.313	8	–	16	.333
Washington State	4	–	12	.250	8	–	19	.296
South
California	4	–	0	1.000	7	–	3	.700
UCLA	3	–	3	.500	10	–	10	.500
USC	1	–	5	.167	8	–	12	.400

The 1943–44 UCLA Bruins men's basketball team represented the University of California, Los Angeles during the 1943–44 NCAA men's basketball season and were members of the Pacific Coast Conference. The Bruins were led by fifth year head coach Wilbur Johns. They finished the regular season with a record of 10–10 and were second in the PCC southern division with a record of 3–3.

== Previous season ==
The Bruins finished the regular season with a record of 14–7 and were second in the PCC southern division with a record of 4–4.

== Roster ==
1943–44 UCLA Bruins men's basketball team
Players
Coaches

Pos.	#	Name	Height	Weight	Year	Hometown
G	15	Don Borden	—	—
C	17	Frank Bowman	—	—
F	16	Dave Brown	—	—
F	8	Guy Buccola	—	—	Fr
G	9	Jack Dooling	—	—
C	7	Jack Heald	—	—
F	23	Hal Michaels	—	—
G	20	Bill Putnam	—	—
G	3	Bill Rankin	—	—	Fr
F	12	Dick West (C)	—	—	So

Head coach

Wilbur Johns (UCLA)

Assistant coach(es)

- Jack Montgomery (UCLA)

Legend

- (C) Team captain
- (S) Suspended
- (I) Ineligible
- (W) Walk-on
- Injured
- Current redshirt

Roster
Last update: 30 January 2018

== Schedule ==
Date time, TV	Rank^{#}	Opponent^{#}	Result	Record	Site city, state
Regular Season
December 3, 1943*		Pepperdine	L 36–48	0–1	Men's Gym; Los Angeles, CA
December 4, 1943*		at Long Beach Ferry Command	L 18–23	0–2	Long Beach, CA
December 10, 1943*		Caltech	W 58–41	1–2	Men's Gym; Los Angeles, CA
December 11, 1943*		Occidental	W 52–34	2–2	Men's Gym; Los Angeles, CA
December 17, 1943*		at Redlands	W 50–26	3–2	Redlands, CA
December 18, 1943*		Redlands	W 56–39	4–2	Men's Gym; Los Angeles, CA
December 30, 1943*		at Roosevelt Base	L 42–43	4–3	San Pedro, CA
December 31, 1943*		20th Century Fox	L 41–49	4–4	Men's Gym; Los Angeles, CA
January 7, 1944*		Camp Santa Anita	W 47–40	5–4	Men's Gym; Los Angeles, CA
January 8, 1945		USC	W 33–19	6–4 (1–0)	Men's Gym; Los Angeles, CA
January 14, 1944*		at Caltech	L 36–38	6–5	Pasadena, CA
January 15, 1944*		at Occidental	W 44–42	7–5	Los Angeles, CA
January 22, 1944		at USC	L 41–48	7–6 (1–1)	Shrine Auditorium; Los Angeles, CA
January 28, 1944*		March Field	L 32–34	7–7	Men's Gym; Los Angeles, CA
January 29, 1944		California	L 27–36	7–8 (1–2)	Men's Gym; Los Angeles, CA
February 5, 1944		at California	L 34–36	7–9 (1–3)	Men's Gym; Berkeley, CA
February 11, 1944*		at Pepperdine	W 40–38	8–9	Los Angeles, CA
February 12, 1944*		at San Diego Naval Training Center	L 36–43	8–10	San Diego, CA
February 18, 1944		at USC	W 32–30	9–10 (2–3)	Shrine Auditorium; Los Angeles, CA
February 19, 1944		at USC	W 40–32	10–10 (3–3)	Shrine Auditorium; Los Angeles, CA
*Non-conference game. ^{#}Rankings from AP Poll. (#) Tournament seedings in parentheses. All times are in Pacific Time.
