= Robert Sherwin =

Personal information
- Born: May 13, 1951 (age 75) St. Louis, Missouri, U.S.
- Listed height: 5 ft 11 in (1.80 m)
- Listed weight: 165 lb (75 kg)

Career information
- High school: Katella (Anaheim, California)
- College: Army (1969–1973)
- NBA draft: 1973: undrafted
- Position: Guard

Career highlights
- Frances Pomeroy Naismith Award (1973)

Robert Hoole Sherwin, Jr. (born May 13, 1951) is an American former businessman who is a graduate of the United States Military Academy and the winner of the 1973 Frances Pomeroy Naismith Award.

== Early life ==
Sherwin was born in 1951 in St. Louis, Missouri, to Robert Sherwin Sr. and Jeanne Sherwin (née Davis). He is the third of five children, and the only boy. As a teenager Sherwin moved with his family to Southern California where he attended middle school and high school.

He attended Katella High School in Anaheim, California, where he excelled academically and in both basketball and baseball. His senior year he led the basketball team to the California Southern Section 2A championship, where Katella played (and ultimately lost to) Verbum Dei, 90-87, "in what some consider the greatest basketball title game in Southern Section history." He played basketball at Katella under coach Tom Danley, one of the most successful high school basketball coaches in California history.

== West Point and the Army ==
Sherwin attended the United States Military Academy at West Point, New York and graduated in the top quarter of his class in 1973. He was a member of the Black Knights basketball team, recruited in 1969 to play at West Point by then head coach Bobby Knight. Sherwin was the starting point guard his sophomore through senior years and for his career averaged 17.6 points per game and shot 86% from the free throw line. Prior to his senior year Sherwin was chosen by his teammates to be the West Point team captain and at the end of that year was named by the Naismith Basketball Hall of Fame as the recipient of the 1972-1973 Frances Pomeroy Naismith Award as the best player in the nation six feet tall or under. In both his junior and senior years at West Point Sherwin was also named to the All-Metropolitan New York basketball team and to the Academic All-American basketball team. In 1973 he was one of five Division I players to receive an NCAA post-graduate scholarship for academic and athletic achievements.

Following his graduation from West Point, Sherwin went on to achieve the rank of Captain in the Army. His primary duty was as an air defense missile systems officer (Improved Hawk) and he served in units in Florida, South Korea, and Texas. During his service, he was also selected to play on the All-Armed Forces basketball team and was named to the AAU All-American basketball team in 1977 when his team won the national AAU title. Though he was stationed all over the world, it was during his time on assignment to Key West, Florida, that he met his wife, Susan Sherwin (née Perdue), who was an officer in the Navy also stationed in Key West.

== Post-graduate studies and career ==
Sherwin earned a Master of Business Administration in finance and accounting from the University of Michigan in 1981. In his early career he was an engine design engineer at Ford Motor Company, a systems consultant at Deloitte, and the vice president and controller of Oral-B Laboratories. His business background also includes extensive experience in software and Web application businesses. He was the co-founder and CEO of both FlipDog.com and WhizBang! Labs. FlipDog, an online recruiting website, was named by PC Magazine as one of the Best 100 sites on the Web. Sherwin is also a co-founder and former board member of TexSEM Labs, the world's leading supplier of EBSD systems used to analyze the microstructure of crystalline materials, and LiveWire Innovations, a developer of diagnostic equipment used to locate electrical faults in complex live wire networks.

Later in his career Sherwin spent more than 35 years as an executive, leader, coach, and mentor in some of the world's largest and most successful training and development companies. Most recently he was the EVP of Corporate Development at Mandel Communications and prior to that was the COO at Zenger Folkman. He is a co-author of the best-selling leadership book, How To Be Exceptional: Drive Leadership Success by Magnifying Your Strengths (McGraw-Hill, 2012). In the training industry Sherwin was also the CEO of Kaset International, the SVP of Operations and CFO of AchieveGlobal, the CFO of Zenger-Miller, and the President of Industrial Training Zone, a groundbreaking provider of Web-delivered technical training in PLC's and motion control.

== Family ==
Sherwin is married to Susan Sherwin. They have four children and 11 grandchildren.
