= List of presidents of the National Association of Basketball Coaches =

Below is a List of National Association of Basketball Coaches presidents

== Presidents ==
Year	Coach	University
1927–29	Forrest "Phog" Allen	Kansas
1929–30	Craig Ruby	Illinois
1930–31	Lew Andreas	Syracuse
1931–32	Arthur Schabinger	Creighton
1932–33	Harold Olsen	Ohio State
1933–34	Roy Mundorff	Georgia Tech
1934–35	Howard Ortner	Cornell
1935–36	Arthur "Dutch" Lonborg	Northwestern
1936–37	Henry "Doc" Carlson	Pittsburgh
1937–38	George Edwards	Missouri
1938–39	Bill Chandler	Marquette
1939–40	Brandon Grover	Ohio
1940–41	Nat Holman	CCNY
1941–42	Nelson Norgren	Chicago
1942–44	Edward Kelleher	Fordham
1944–46	Edward Hickox	Springfield
1946–47	Blair Gullion	Connecticut
1947–48	Howard Hobson	Oregon
1948–49	Buck Read	Western Michigan
1949–50	John Bunn	Springfield
1950–51	Vadal Peterson	Utah
1951–52	Bruce Drake	Oklahoma
1952–53	Franklin Cappon	Princeton
1953–54	Edgar "Eddie" Hickey	Saint Louis
1954–55	Paul "Tony" Hinkle	Butler
1955–56	Harold "Bud" Foster	Wisconsin
1956–57	Ray Oostering	Trinity (TX)
1957–58	Amory "Slats" Gill	Oregon State
1958–59	Clifford Wells	Tulane
1959–60	Everett Shelton	Sacramento State
1960–61	Bill Henderson	Baylor
1961–62	Wilbur Stalcup	Missouri
1962–63	Harold Anderson	Bowling Green
1963–64	Lee Williams	Colby
1964–65	Forrest Twogood	Southern California
1965–66	Ben Carnevale	Naval Academy
1966–67	Alvin "Doggie" Julian	Dartmouth
1967–68	Henry Iba	Oklahoma State
1968–69	William Gardiner	Catholic University
1969–70	Stan Watts	BYU
1970–71	Adolph Rupp	Kentucky
1971–72	Bill Wall	MacMurray
1972–73	Fred Taylor	Ohio State
1973–74	Joe Vancisin	Yale
1974–75	Bob Polk	Rice
1975–76	Bill Foster	Duke
1976–77	Abe Lemons	Texas
1977–78	Barry Dowd	Texas-Arlington
1978–79	Ned Wulk	Arizona State
1979–80	Wilber Renken	Albright
1980–81	Marv Harshman	Washington
1981–82	Dean Smith	North Carolina
1982–83	Fred "Tex" Winter	Long Beach State
1983–84	Joe O'Brien	Assumption
1984–85	Jack Hartman	Kansas State
1985–86	John Thompson	Georgetown
1986–87	Billy Key	Missouri-Rolla
1987–88	Eddie Sutton	Kentucky
1988–89	Jud Heathcote	Michigan State
1989–90	Clarence "Big House" Gaines	Winston-Salem State
1990–91	Gerald Myers	Texas Tech
1991–92	Herb Kenny	Wesleyan
1992–93	Johnny Orr	Iowa State
1993–94	George Blaney	Holy Cross
1994–95	Bill Knapton	Beloit
1995–96	George Raveling	Southern California
1996–97	Bob Hanson	Kansas State
1997–98	Mike Jarvis	George Washington
1998–99	Mike Krzyzewski	Duke
1999–00	Denny Crum	Louisville
2000–01	Gene Keady	Purdue
2001–02	Roy Williams	Kansas
2002–03	Ken Kaufman	Worcester Polytechnic Institute
2003–04	Kelvin Sampson	Oklahoma
2004–05	Pat Kennedy	Towson
2005–06	Jim Burson	Muskingum
2006–07	Oliver Purnell	Clemson
2007–08	Jim Boeheim	Syracuse
2008–09	Tubby Smith	Minnesota
2009–10	Dale Clayton	Carson-Newman College
2010–11	Tom Izzo	Michigan State
2011–12	Ernie Kent	Washington State
2012–13	Larry Gipson	Northeastern State
2013–14	Phil Martelli	Saint Joseph's
2014–15	Page Moir	Roanoke College
2015–16	Ron Hunter	Georgia State
2016–17	Jeff Jones	Old Dominion
2017–18	Bill Self	Kansas
2018–19	Charlie Brock	Springfield College
2019–20	Mike Brey	Notre Dame
2020–22	Jamie Dixon	Texas Christian
2022–23	Gary Stewart	Stevenson
2023–24	Lennie Acuff	Lipscomb
2024–25	John Calipari	Arkansas
2025–26	Matt Margenthaler	Minnesota State
