= 1943–44 Georgia Bulldogs basketball team =

American college basketball season

1943–44 Georgia Bulldogs basketball
- Conference: Southeastern Conference
- Record: 7–10 (0–2 SEC)
- Head coach: Elmer A. Lampe (7th season)
- Captain: Edgar Bratton
- Home arena: Woodruff Hall

1943–44 Southeastern Conference men's basketball standings
	Conf.				Overall
Team	W		L	PCT	W		L	PCT
Tulane	4	–	0	1.000	16	–	6	.727
Georgia Tech	2	–	0	1.000	14	–	4	.778
Georgia	0	–	2	.000	7	–	10	.412
LSU	0	–	4	.000	10	–	15	.400
Kentucky †		–		–	19	–	2	.905
Vanderbilt		–		–	12	–	3	.800
† Regular-season championship and SEC Tournament winner

The 1943–44 Georgia Bulldogs basketball team represented the University of Georgia as a member of the Southeastern Conference (SEC) during the 1943–44 NCAA men's basketball season. Led by seventh-year head coach Elmer A. Lampe, the Bulldogs compiled an overall record of 7–10 with a mark of 0–2 in conference play, placing third in the SEC. The team captain was Edgar Bratton.

== Schedule ==
Date time, TV	Opponent	Result	Record	Site city, state
1/7/1944	Lawson General Hospital	W 44-43	1–0	Athens, GA
1/10/1944	at Clemson	W 44-40	2–0	
1/14/1944	at Georgia Med. School	W 38-30	3–0	
1/19/1944	Clemson	W 52-31	4–0	Athens, GA
1/21/1944	at Robins Field	L 42-54	4–1	
1/24/1944	at Mercer	L 44-57	4–2	
1/25/1944	Mercer	L 48-54	4–3	Athens, GA
1/29/1944	South Carolina	L 48-64	4–4	Athens, GA
1/31/1944	A.S.T.P.	L 25-37	4–5	Athens, GA
2/1/1944	at South Carolina	L 35-67	4–6	
2/5/1944	at Lawson General Hospital	W 40-36	5–6	
2/9/1944	Robins Field	W 48-43	6–6	Athens, GA
2/12/1944	Georgia Tech	L 39-42	6–7	Athens, GA
2/15/1944	Georgia Medical School	W 54-44	7–7	Athens, GA
2/19/1944	at Georgia Tech	L 44-71	7–8	
2/22/1944	at A.S.T.P.	L 39-71	7–9	
2/24/1944	Kentucky	L 29-57	7–10	Athens, GA
*Non-conference game. (#) Tournament seedings in parentheses.
