= Frances Pomeroy Naismith Award =

Annual American college basketball award

- Awarded for: the most outstanding male and female college basketball players no taller than 6'0" (1.83 m) and 5'8" (1.73 m), respectively
- Country: United States
- Presented by: NABC (men); WBCA (women)

History
- First award: 1969 (men); 1984 (women)
- Final award: 2014

The Frances Pomeroy Naismith Award was an annual college basketball award in the United States intended to honor players who excelled on the court in spite of their height. The award, named in honor of James Naismith's daughter-in-law, was established for men in 1969 and for women in 1984. The men's award was presented to the nation's most outstanding senior who stands 6 ft 0 in (1.83 m) or shorter, while the women's award was presented to the top senior who is 5 ft 8 in (1.73 m) or shorter. Early in the women's award's history, the cut-off height was 5 ft 6 in (1.68 m). The men's award was selected by a panel from the National Association of Basketball Coaches (NABC), while the women's was selected by the Women's Basketball Coaches Association (WBCA). The award was discontinued following the 2013–14 season.

Both the men's and women's winners were generally players in NCAA Division I. For the men's side, John Rinka from Kenyon College (1970), Mike Scheib from Susquehanna University (1978) and Jerry Johnson from Florida Southern College (1988) won from NCAA Divisions II, III, and II, respectively. For the women's winners, Julie Dabrowski of New Hampshire College (now Southern New Hampshire University) (1990) and Amy Dodrill (1995) and Angie Arnold (1998), both from Johns Hopkins University, were also winners from Division III.

Only three schools from the list of men's winners (Louisville, St. John's and UCLA) and six schools from the list of women's winners (Baylor, Gonzaga, Johns Hopkins, Notre Dame, Penn State, and UConn) had multiple award winners. Of these programs, the only one with winners in consecutive seasons is the Louisville men's program (Peyton Siva in 2013 and Russ Smith in 2014). Six other schools have had winners of both the men's and women's awards: California, Eastern Michigan, NC State, Purdue, Virginia, and Wake Forest.

== Key ==
| * | Awarded a national player of the year award that same season: Men – Sporting News; Oscar Robertson Trophy; Associated Press; NABC; UPI; Naismith; Wooden; Adolph Rupp Trophy; Helms Foundation; Women – Wade; Associated Press; Naismith; Wooden |

== Winners ==
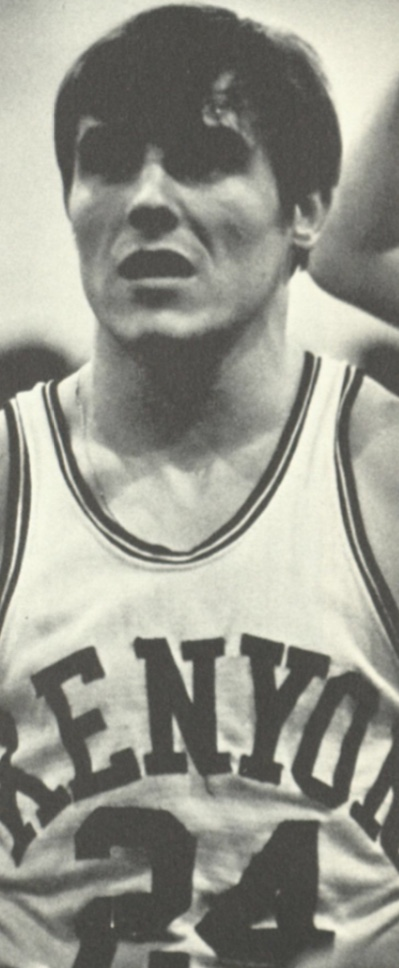
John Rinka, Kenyon, 1970

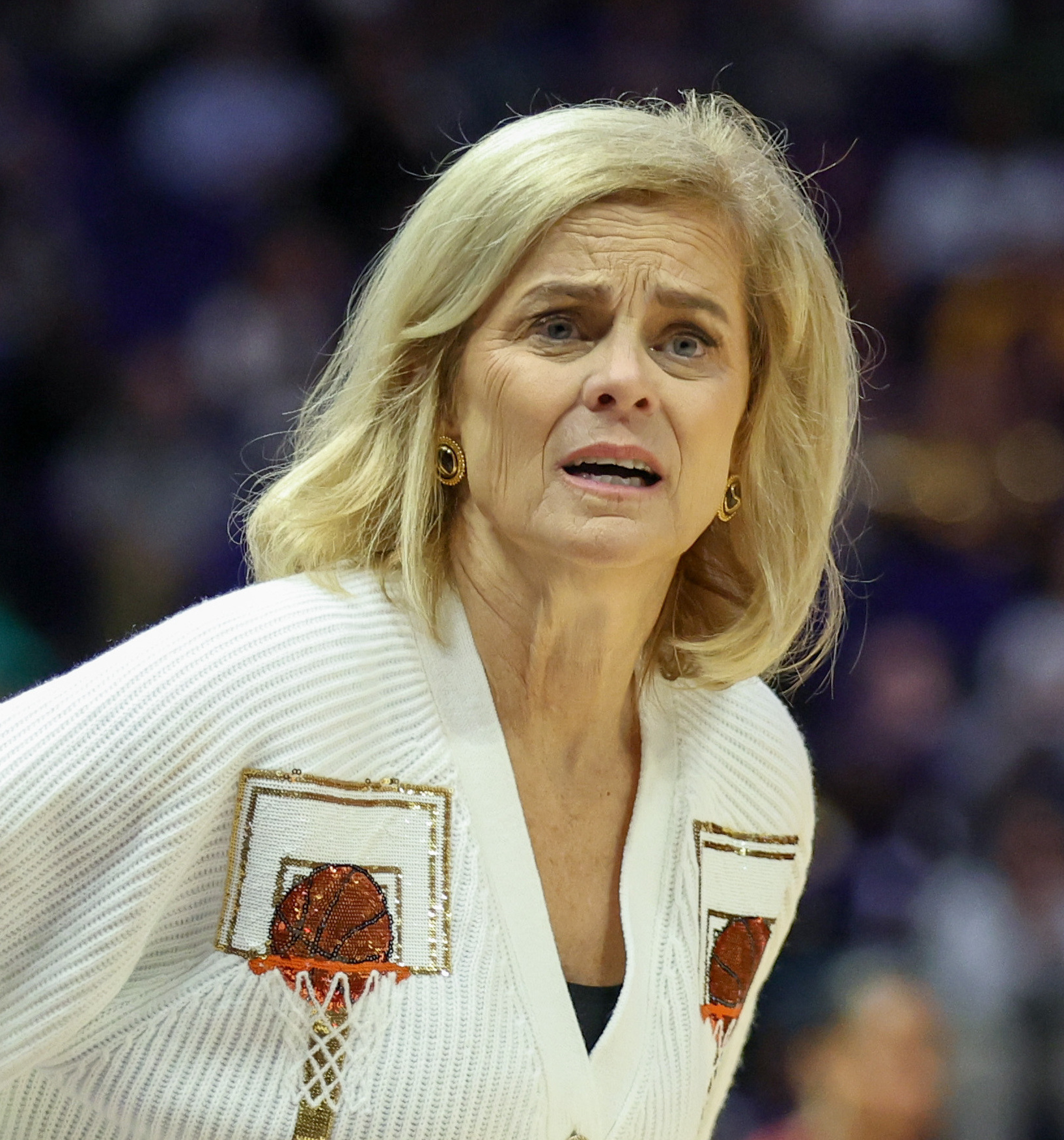
Kim Mulkey, Louisiana Tech, 1984

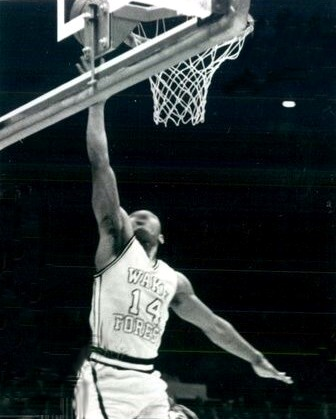
Muggsy Bogues, Wake Forest, 1987

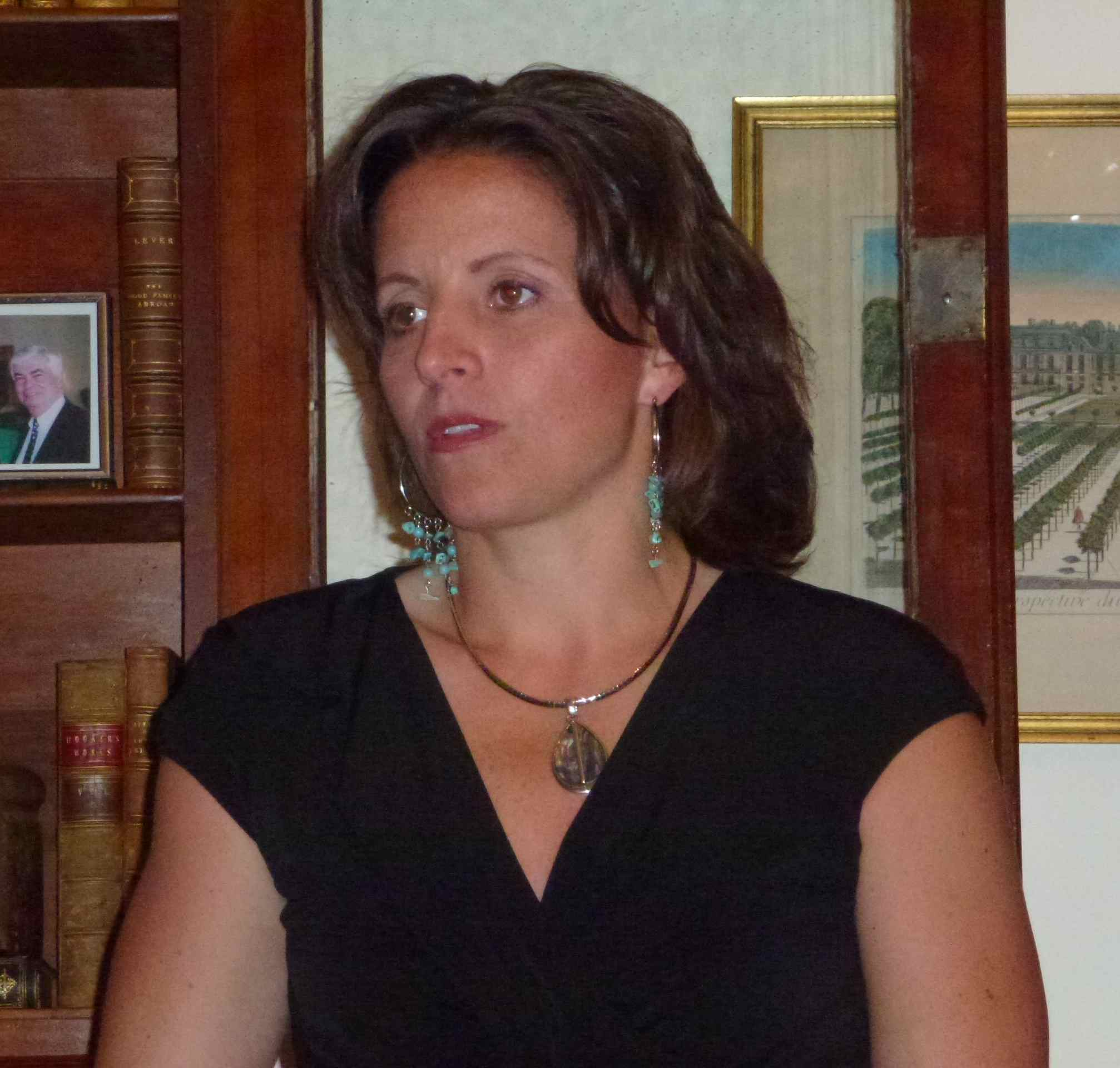
Jennifer Rizzotti, UConn, 1996

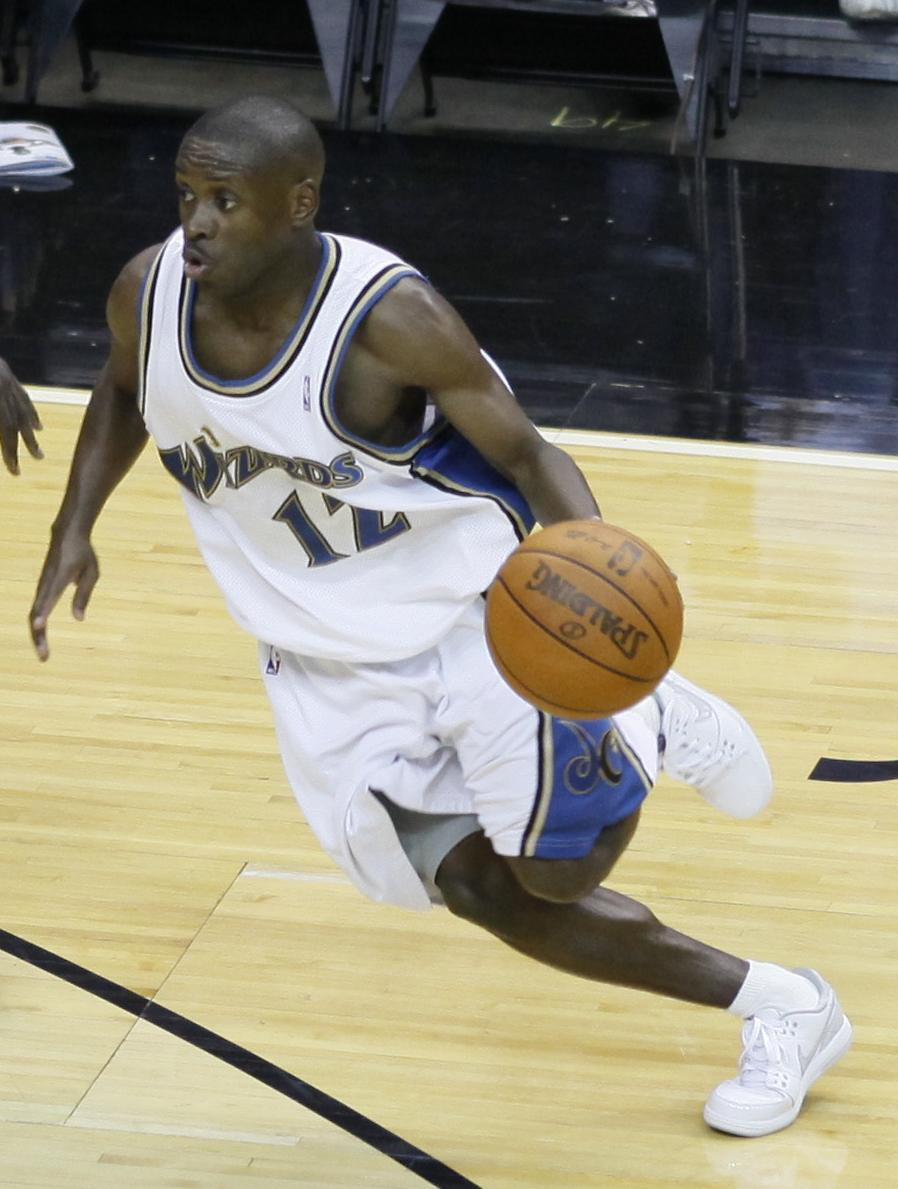
Earl Boykins, Eastern Michigan, 1998

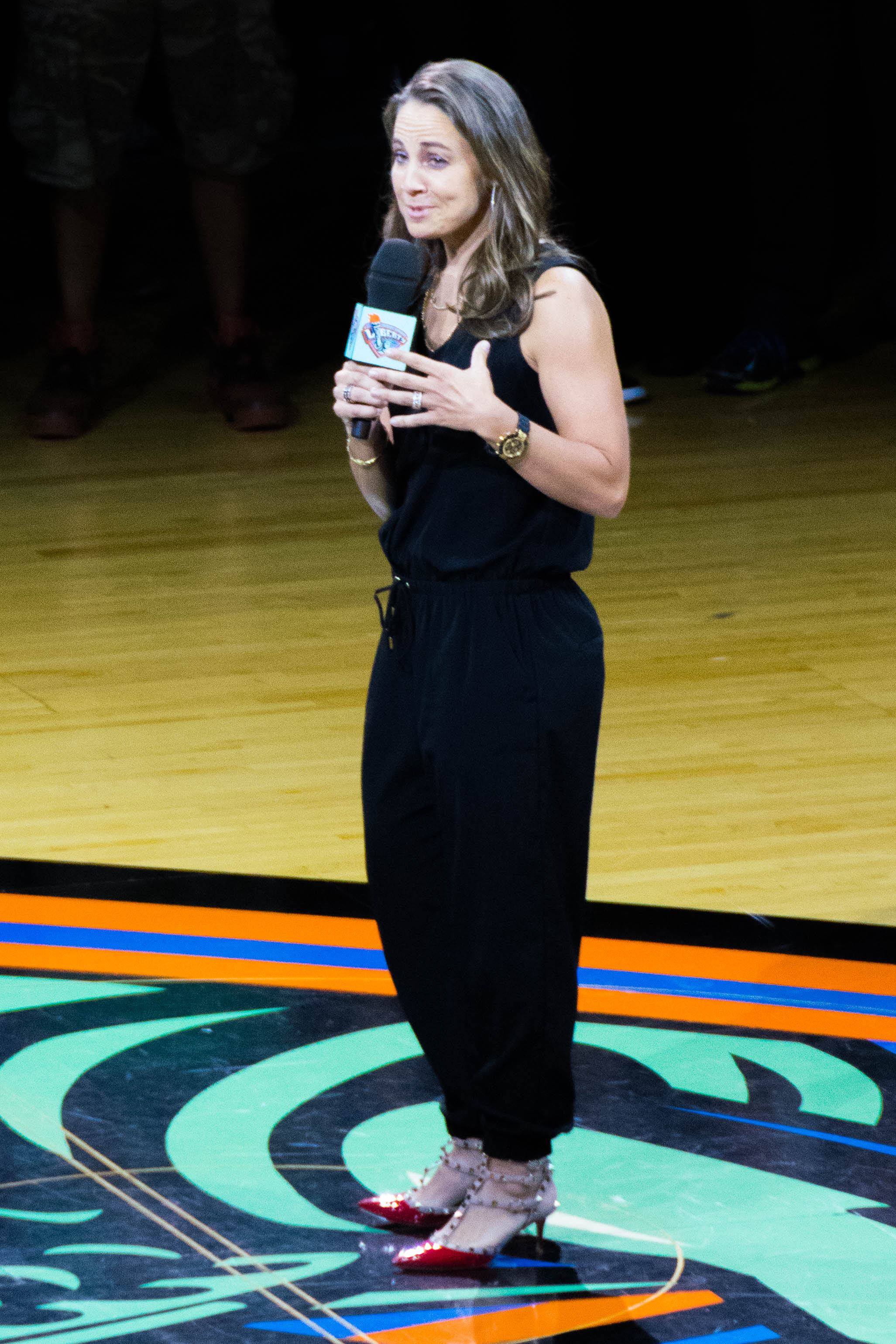
Becky Hammon, Colorado State, 1999

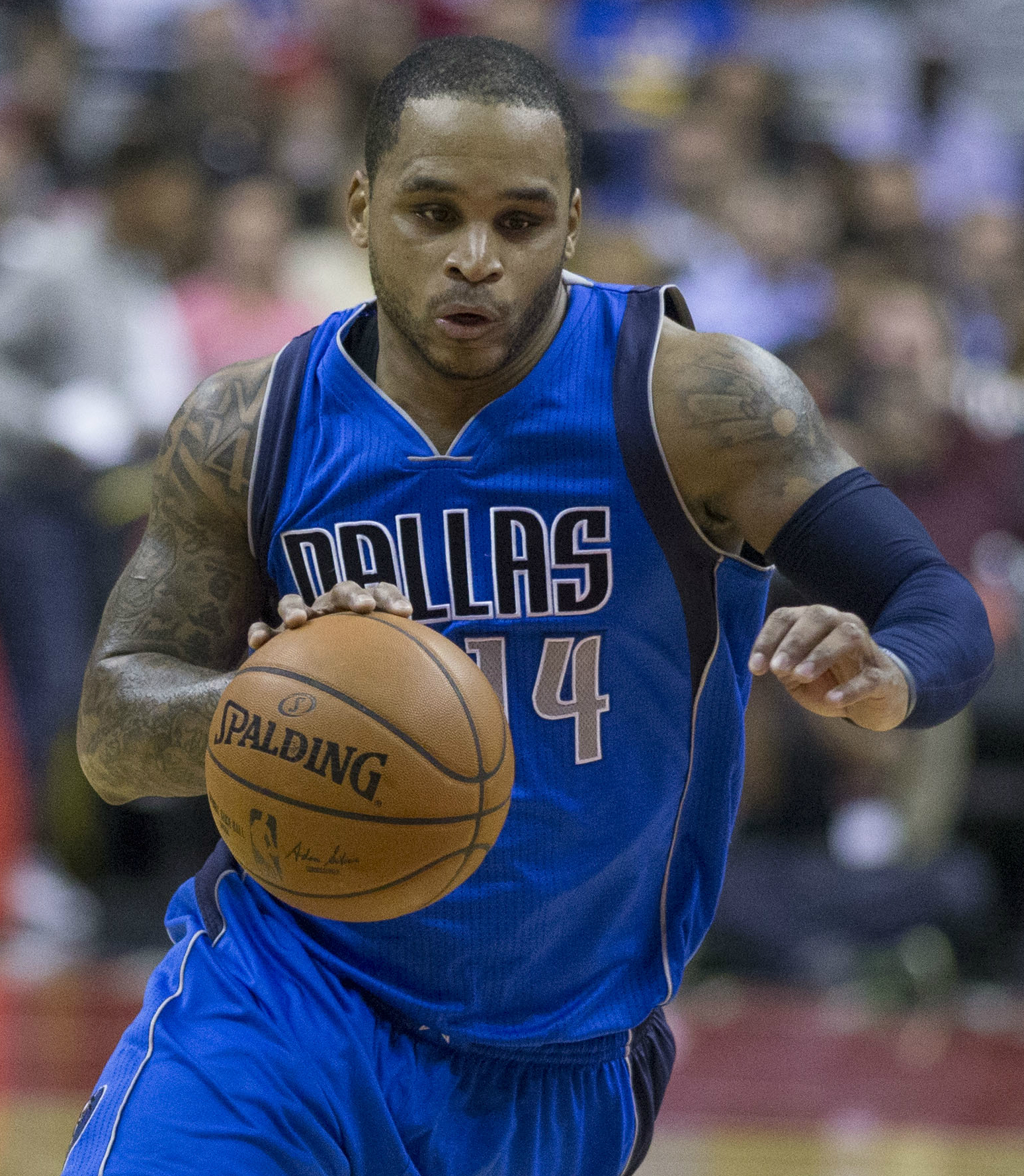
Jameer Nelson, Saint Joseph's, 2004

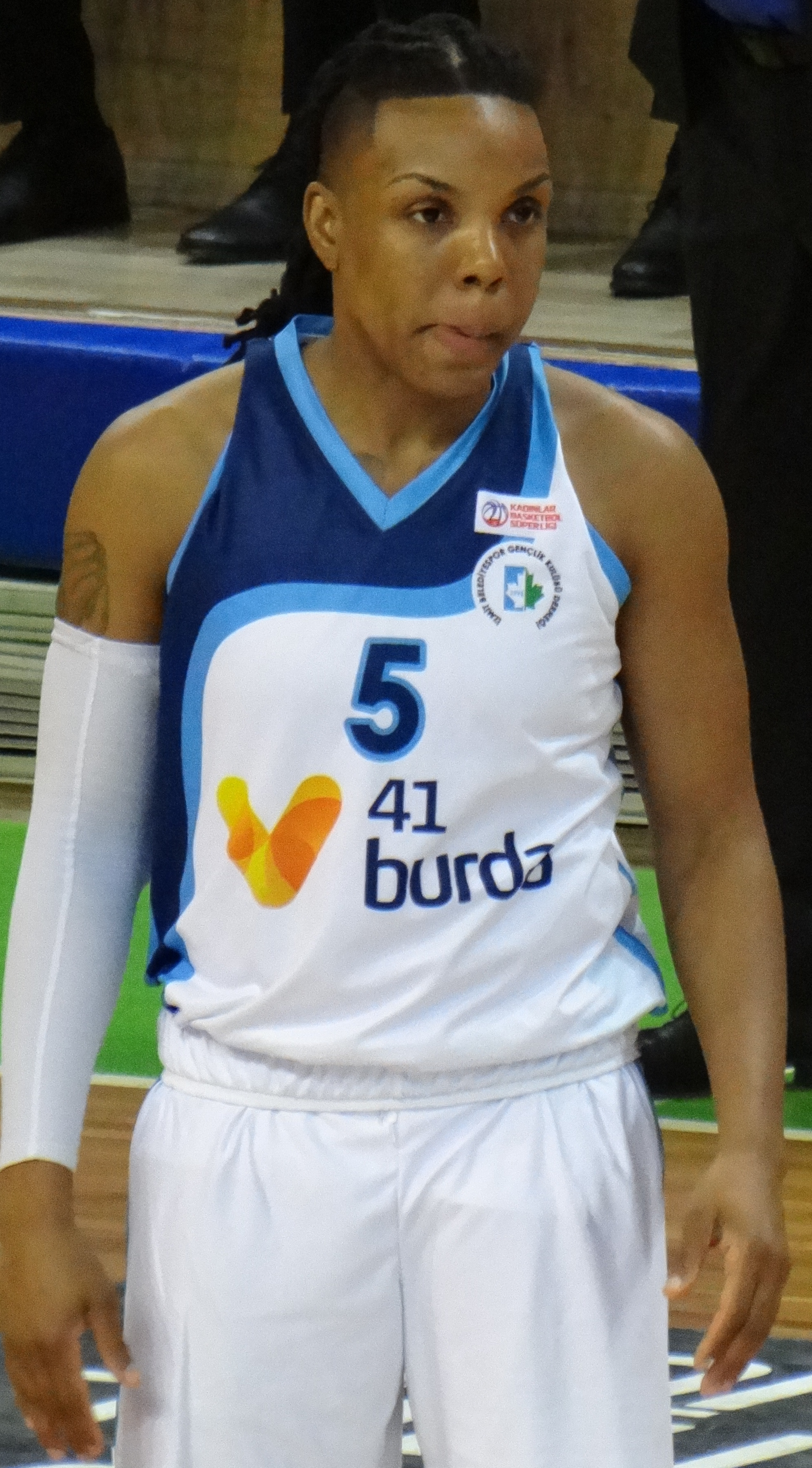
Tan White, Mississippi State, 2005

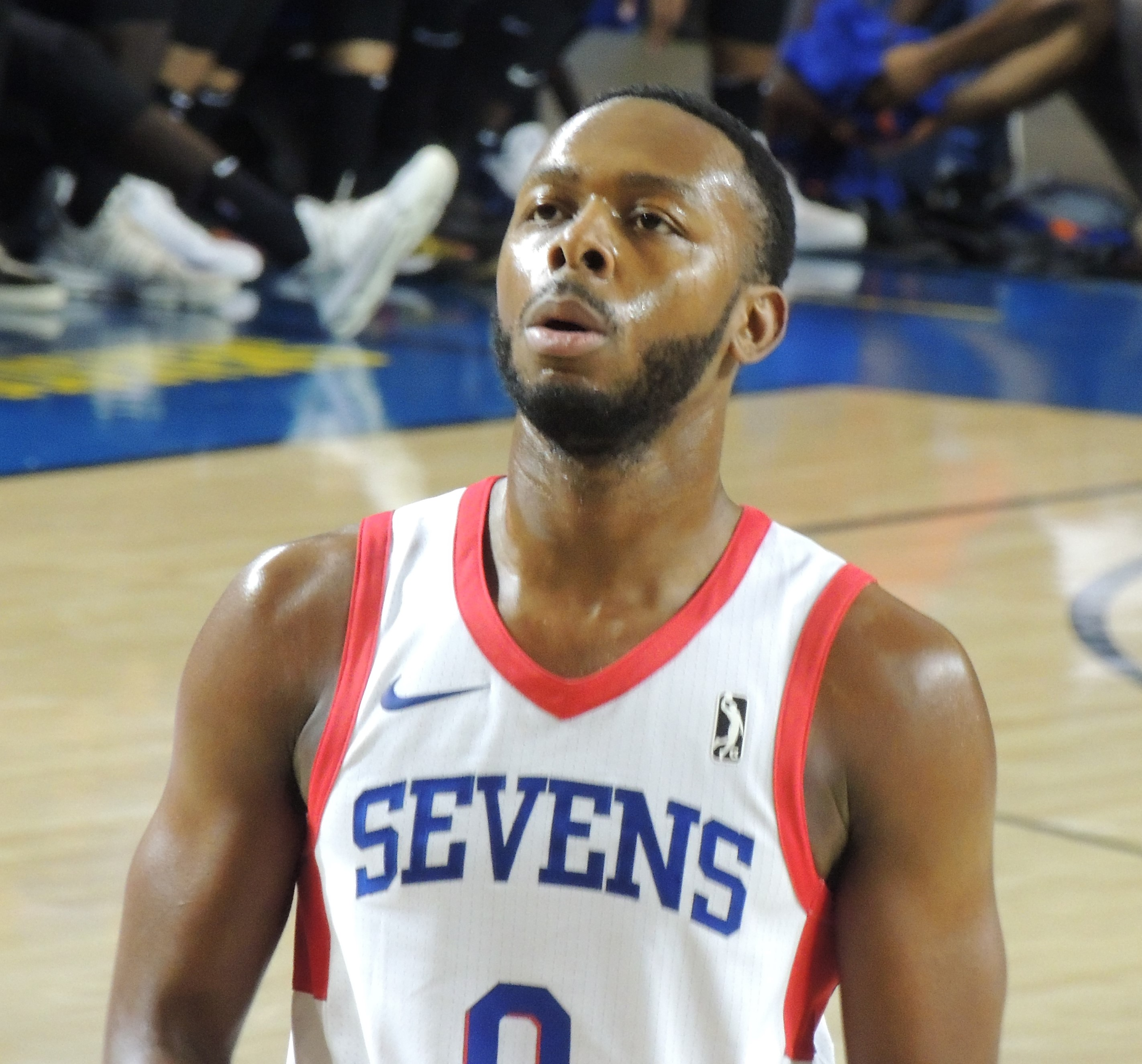
Jacob Pullen, Kansas State, 2011

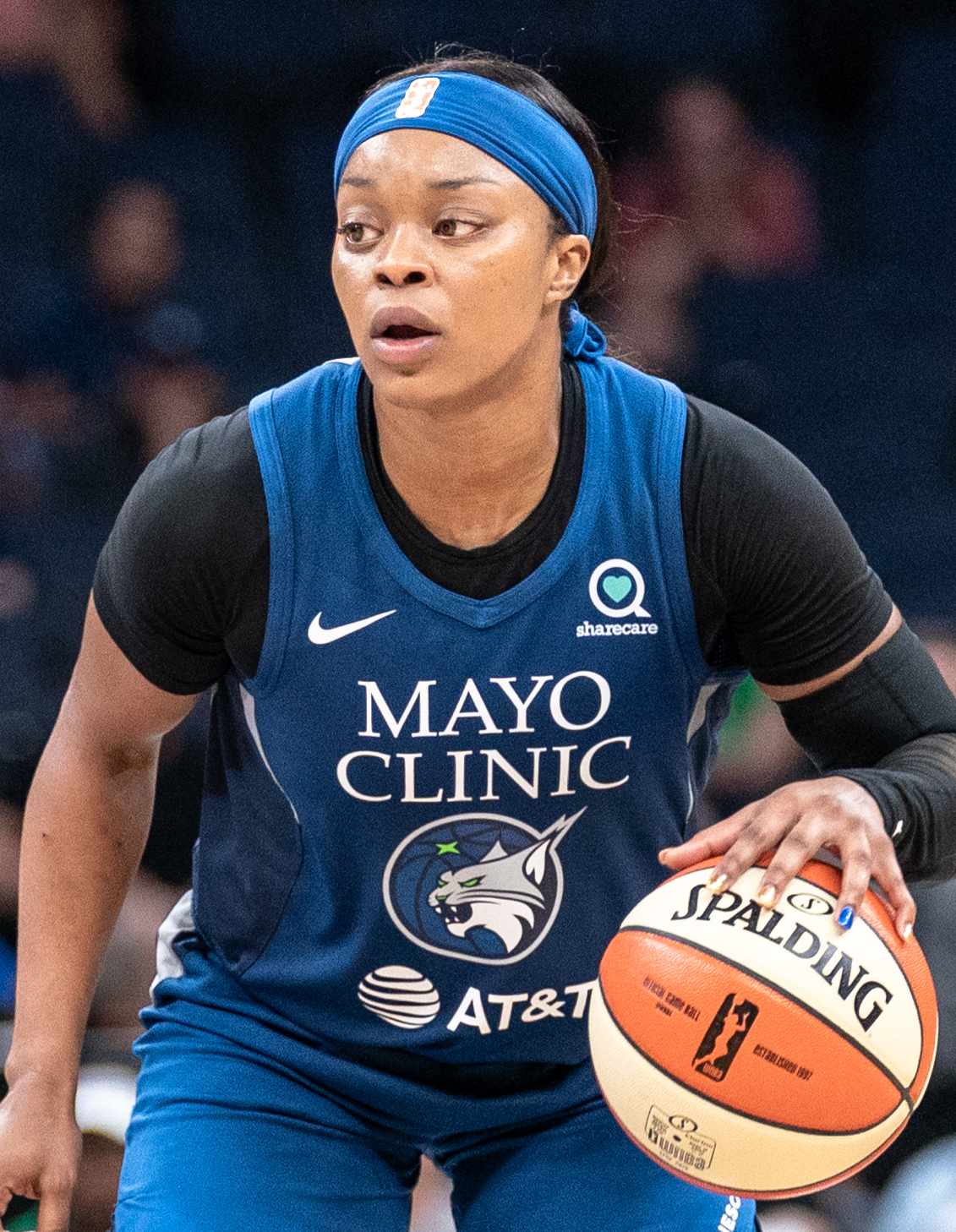
Odyssey Sims, Baylor, 2014

Men
| Year | Player | School | Height | Reference |
|---|---|---|---|---|
| 1968–69 | Billy Keller | Purdue | 5'10" (1.78 m) | |
| 1969–70 | John Rinka | Kenyon | 5'9" (1.75 m) | |
| 1970–71 | Charles Johnson | California | 6'0" (1.83 m) | |
| 1971–72 | Scott Martin | Oklahoma | 6'0" (1.83 m) | |
| 1972–73 | Robert Sherwin | Army | 5'11" (1.80 m) | |
| 1973–74 | Mike Robinson | Michigan State | 5'11" (1.80 m) | |
| 1974–75 | Monte Towe | NC State | 5'7" (1.70 m) | |
| 1975–76 | Frank Alagia | St. John's | 5'10" (1.78 m) | |
| 1976–77 | Jeff Jonas | Utah | 6'0" (1.83 m) | |
| 1977–78 | Mike Scheib | Susquehanna | 5'8" (1.73 m) | |
| 1978–79 | Alton Byrd | Columbia | 5'9" (1.75 m) | |
| 1979–80 | Jim Sweeney | Boston College | 5'11" (1.80 m) | |
| 1980–81 | Terry Adolph | West Texas State | 5'8" (1.73 m) | |
| 1981–82 | Jack Moore | Nebraska | 5'9" (1.75 m) | |
| 1982–83 | Ray McCallum | Ball State | 5'9" (1.75 m) | |
| 1983–84 | Ricky Stokes | Virginia | 5'10" (1.78 m) | |
| 1984–85 | Bubba Jennings | Texas Tech | 5'11" (1.80 m) | |
| 1985–86 | Jim Les | Bradley | 5'11" (1.80 m) | |
| 1986–87 | Muggsy Bogues | Wake Forest | 5'3" (1.60 m) | |
| 1987–88 | Jerry Johnson | Florida Southern | 5'11" (1.80 m) | |
| 1988–89 | Tim Hardaway | UTEP | 6'0" (1.83 m) | |
| 1989–90 | Boo Harvey | St. John's | 6'0" (1.83 m) | |
| 1990–91 | Keith Jennings | East Tennessee State | 5'7" (1.70 m) | |
| 1991–92 | Tony Bennett | Green Bay | 6'0" (1.83 m) | |
| 1992–93 | Sam Crawford | New Mexico State | 5'8" (1.73 m) | |
| 1993–94 | Greg Brown | New Mexico | 5'7" (1.70 m) | |
| 1994–95 | Tyus Edney | UCLA | 5'10" (1.78 m) | |
| 1995–96 | Eddie Benton | Vermont | 5'11" (1.80 m) | |
| 1996–97 | Brevin Knight | Stanford | 5'10" (1.78 m) | |
| 1997–98 | Earl Boykins | Eastern Michigan | 5'5" (1.65 m) | |
| 1998–99 | Shawnta Rogers | George Washington | 5'4" (1.63 m) | |
| 1999–00 | Scoonie Penn | Ohio State | 5'11" (1.80 m) | |
| 2000–01 | Rashad Phillips | Detroit Mercy | 5'9" (1.78 m) | |
| 2001–02 | Steve Logan | Cincinnati | 5'10" (1.78 m) | |
| 2002–03 | Jason Gardner | Arizona | 5'10" (1.78 m) | |
| 2003–04 | Jameer Nelson* | Saint Joseph's | 6'0" (1.83 m) | |
| 2004–05 | Nate Robinson | Washington | 5'9" (1.75 m) | |
| 2005–06 | Dee Brown* | Illinois | 6'0" (1.83 m) | |
| 2006–07 | Tre Kelley | South Carolina | 6'0" (1.83 m) | |
| 2007–08 | Mike Green | Butler | 6'0" (1.83 m) | |
| 2008–09 | Darren Collison | UCLA | 6'0" (1.83 m) | |
| 2009–10 | Sherron Collins | Kansas | 5'11" (1.80 m) | |
| 2010–11 | Jacob Pullen | Kansas State | 6'0" (1.83 m) | |
| 2011–12 | Reggie Hamilton | Oakland | 5'11" (1.80 m) | |
| 2012–13 | Peyton Siva | Louisville | 6'0" (1.83 m) | |
| 2013–14 | Russ Smith | Louisville | 6'0" (1.83 m) | |

Women
| Year | Player | School | Height | Reference |
|---|---|---|---|---|
| 1968–69 | No award | | | |
| 1969–70 | No award | | | |
| 1970–71 | No award | | | |
| 1971–72 | No award | | | |
| 1972–73 | No award | | | |
| 1973–74 | No award | | | |
| 1974–75 | No award | | | |
| 1975–76 | No award | | | |
| 1976–77 | No award | | | |
| 1977–78 | No award | | | |
| 1978–79 | No award | | | |
| 1979–80 | No award | | | |
| 1980–81 | No award | | | |
| 1981–82 | No award | | | |
| 1982–83 | No award | | | |
| 1983–84 | Kim Mulkey | Louisiana Tech | 5'4" (1.63 m) | |
| 1984–85 | Maria Stack | Gonzaga | 5'5" (1.65 m) | |
| 1985–86 | Kamie Ethridge* | Texas | 5'5" (1.65 m) | |
| 1986–87 | Rhonda Windham | USC | 5'5" (1.65 m) | |
| 1987–88 | Suzie McConnell | Penn State | 5'5" (1.65 m) | |
| 1988–89 | Paulette Backstrom | Bowling Green | 5'5" (1.65 m) | |
| 1989–90 | Julie Dabrowski | New Hampshire College | 5'5" (1.65 m) | |
| 1990–91 | Shanya Evans | Providence | 5'2" (1.57 m) | |
| 1991–92 | Rosemary Kosiorek | West Virginia | 5'5" (1.65 m) | |
| 1992–93 | Dena Evans | Virginia | 5'4" (1.63 m) | |
| 1993–94 | Nicole Levesque | Wake Forest | 5'3" (1.60 m) | |
| 1994–95 | Amy Dodrill | Johns Hopkins | 5'4" (1.63 m) | |
| 1995–96 | Jennifer Rizzotti* | UConn | 5'6" (1.68 m) | |
| 1996–97 | Jennifer Howard | NC State | 5'6" (1.68 m) | |
| 1997–98 | Angie Arnold | Johns Hopkins | 5'6" (1.68 m) | |
| 1998–99 | Becky Hammon | Colorado State | 5'6" (1.68 m) | |
| 1999–00 | Helen Darling | Penn State | 5'6" (1.68 m) | |
| 2000–01 | Niele Ivey | Notre Dame | 5'7" (1.70 m) | |
| 2001–02 | Sheila Lambert | Baylor | 5'7" (1.70 m) | |
| 2002–03 | Kara Lawson | Tennessee | 5'8" (1.73 m) | |
| 2003–04 | Erika Valek | Purdue | 5'6" (1.68 m) | |
| 2004–05 | Tan White | Mississippi State | 5'7" (1.70 m) | |
| 2005–06 | Megan Duffy | Notre Dame | 5'7" (1.70 m) | |
| 2006–07 | Lindsey Harding* | Duke | 5'8" (1.73 m) | |
| 2007–08 | Jolene Anderson | Wisconsin | 5'8" (1.73 m) | |
| 2008–09 | Renee Montgomery | UConn | 5'7" (1.70 m) | |
| 2009–10 | Alexis Gray-Lawson | California | 5'8" (1.73 m) | |
| 2010–11 | Courtney Vandersloot | Gonzaga | 5'8" (1.73 m) | |
| 2011–12 | Tavelyn James | Eastern Michigan | 5'7" (1.70 m) | |
| 2012–13 | Alex Bentley | Penn State | 5'8" (1.73 m) | |
| 2013–14 | Odyssey Sims* | Baylor | 5'8" (1.73 m) | |
