= 1943–44 Army Cadets men's basketball team =

American college basketball season

1943–44 Army Cadets men's basketball

Helms Foundation national champion
- Conference: Independent
- Record: 15–0
- Head coach: Ed Kelleher (1st season)
- MVP: Dale Hall
- Captain: Ed Christl
- Home arena: Gillis Field House

The 1943–44 Army Cadets men's basketball team represented the United States Military Academy (known as "Army" for their sports teams) during the 1943–44 intercollegiate basketball season in the United States. The head coach was Ed Kelleher, coaching in his first season with the Cadets. The team finished the season with a 15–0 record, No. 1 ranking in the Converse-Dunkel Basketball Forecast, and was named the national champion by the Helms Athletic Foundation. The Helms and NCAA Division I Tournament champions were the same except for 1939, 1940, 1944, and 1954 when Oregon, Indiana, Utah, and La Salle respectively won the tournament. The Cadets were later retroactively listed as the top team of the season by the Premo-Porretta Power Poll.

Dale Hall was named a consensus All-American as well as the Sporting News National Player of the Year. Other players of note on the team included Doug Kenna '45, John Hennessey '44 (who served with the 70th Infantry Division in World War II and ultimately retired as a general officer), Robert Faas '44 (who flew in the Pacific theater as a P-47N pilot in the waning days of World War II), and Edward C. Christl '44, who was awarded a posthumous Distinguished Service Cross and for whom Army's Christl Arena is named.

== Schedule and results ==
Date time, TV	Rank^{#}	Opponent^{#}	Result	Record	Site city, state
Regular season
*		Swarthmore	W 80–29	1–0	
*		Colgate	W 69–44	2–0	
*		St. John's	W 49–36	3–0	
*		Columbia	W 55–37	4–0	
*		Wesleyan	W 49–38	5–0	
*		Coast Guard	W 55–37	6–0	
*		West Virginia	W 58–31	7–0	
*		Rochester	W 57–43	8–0	
*		Pittsburgh	W 66–32	9–0	
*		Hobart	W 69–36	10–0	
*		Penn	W 55–38	11–0	
*		Villanova	W 34–22	12–0	
*		NYU	W 46–36	13–0	
*		Maryland	W 85–22	14–0	
*		Navy	W 47–40	15–0	
*Non-conference game. ^{#}Rankings from AP Poll. (#) Tournament seedings in parentheses.
