= 1943–44 Kansas Jayhawks men's basketball team =

American college basketball season

1943–44 Kansas Jayhawks men's basketball
- Conference: Big Six Conference
- Record: 17–9 (5–5 Big 6)
- Head coach: Phog Allen (27th season)
- Captain: Harold McSpadden
- Home arena: Hoch Auditorium

1943–44 Big Six Conference men's basketball standings
	Conf.				Overall
Team	W		L	PCT	W		L	PCT
Iowa State	9	–	1	.900	14	–	4	.778
Oklahoma	9	–	1	.900	15	–	8	.652
Kansas	5	–	5	.500	17	–	9	.654
Missouri	5	–	5	.500	10	–	9	.526
Kansas State	1	–	9	.100	7	–	15	.318
Nebraska	1	–	9	.100	2	–	13	.133

The 1943–44 Kansas Jayhawks men's basketball team represented the University of Kansas during the 1943–44 college men's basketball season.

== Roster ==
- George Dick
- Willard Frank
- Gordon Stucker
- Dean Corder
- Harold McSpadden
- Charles Moffett
- Homer Sherwood
- Louis Goehring
- Robert Turner
- William Lindquist
- Robert Malott
- Donald Diehl
- Donald Barrington
- James E. Roderick Jr.

== Schedule ==
Date time, TV	Rank^{#}	Opponent^{#}	Result	Record	Site city, state
December 1*		Herington AAB	W 40–27	1-0	Hoch Auditorium; Lawrence, KS
December 4*		Hutchinson NAB	L 32–46	1-1	Hoch Auditorium; Lawrence, KS
December 12*		at Ft. Leavenworth	W 31–27	2-1	Hoch Auditorium; Lawrence, KS
December 10*		at Washburn	W 46–24	3-1	Topeka, KS
December 11		at Rockhurst	W 45–32	4-1	Municipal Auditorium; Kansas City, MO
December 13*		Rockhurst	W 43–28	5-1	Hoch Auditorium; Lawrence, KS
December 15*		Olathe NAB	L 36–42	5-2	Hoch Auditorium; Lawrence, KS
December 17*		Ft. Riley CRTC	W 32–31	6-2	Hoch Auditorium; Lawrence, KS
December 23*		Herington AAB	W 22–15	7-2	Herington, KS
December 29		vs. Kansas State; Sunflower Showdown	W 62–44	8-2	Municipal Auditorium; Kansas City, MO
December 30		vs. Missouri; Border War	W 34–27	9-2	Municipal Auditorium; Kansas City, MO
January 3		Pittsburg State	W 35–21	10-2	Hoch Auditorium; Lawrence, KS
January 8		at Missouri; Border War	L 28–35	10-3 (0-1)	Brewer Fieldhouse; Columbia, MO
January 11*		at Olathe NAB	L 25–49	10-4	Olathe, KS
January 15		at Nebraska	W 51–27	11-4 (1-1)	Hoch Auditorium; Lawrence, KS
January 18		Kansas State; Sunflower Showdown	W 36–30	12-4 (2-1)	Hoch Auditorium; Lawrence, KS
January 21		Oklahoma	L 23–24	12-5 (2-2)	Hoch Auditorium; Lawrence, KS
January 29		at Iowa State	L 29–40	12-6 (2-3)	State Gymnasium; Ames, IA
February 2*		Washburn	W 35–22	13-6	Hoch Auditorium; Lawrence, KS
February 7*		Ft. Riley CRTC	L 38–43	13-7	Ft. Riley, KS
February 12		at Oklahoma	L 35–39	13-8 (2-4)	Field House; Norman, OK
February 15*		at Ft. Leavenworth	W 54–52	14-8	Leavenworth, KS
February 19		at Nebraska	W 56–47	15-8 (3-4)	Nebraska Coliseum; Lincoln, NE
February 23		at Kansas State	W 32–24	16-8 (4-4)	Nichols Hall; Manhattan, KS
February 26		Missouri; Border War	W 40–27	17-8 (5-4)	Hoch Auditorium; Lawrence, KS
March 3		Iowa State	L 25–47	17-9 (5-5)	Hoch Auditorium; Lawrence, KS
*Non-conference game. ^{#}Rankings from AP Poll. (#) Tournament seedings in parentheses.
