= Bill Henry (basketball) =

American basketball player (1924–1985)

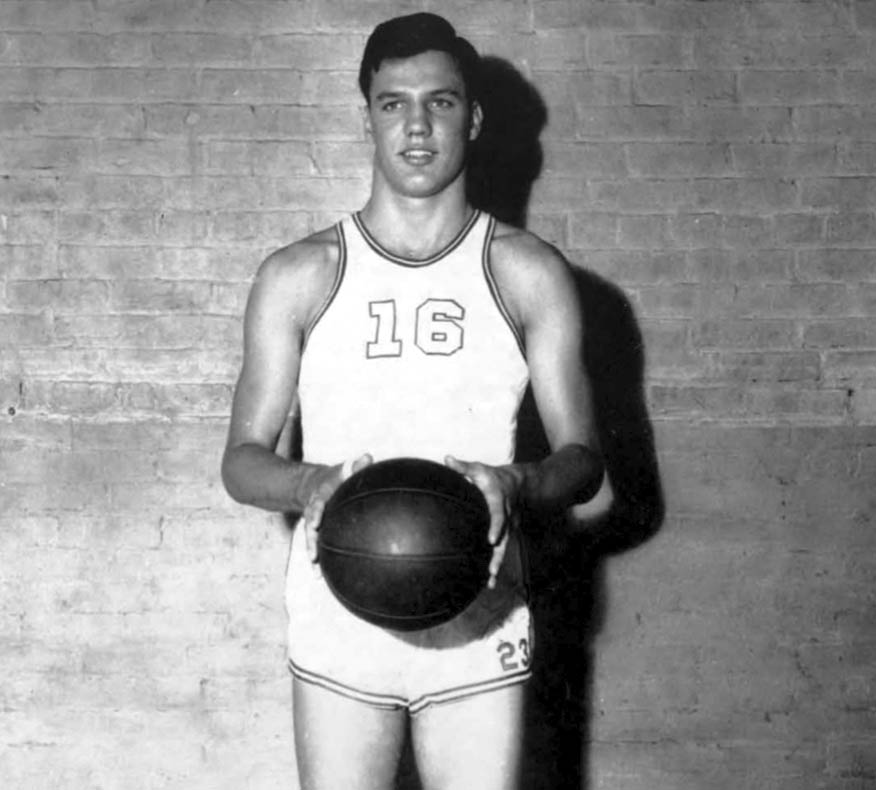
- Henry in his senior year at Rice

Personal information
- Born: December 27, 1924 Dallas, Texas, U.S.
- Died: January 1, 1985 (aged 60)
- Listed height: 6 ft 9 in (2.06 m)
- Listed weight: 215 lb (98 kg)

Career information
- High school: Highland Park (University Park, Texas)
- College: Rice (1942–1945)
- Playing career: 1947–1950
- Position: Center
- Number: 30, 16, 20

Career history
- 1947–1948: Houston Mavericks
- 1948–1950: Fort Wayne Pistons
- 1950: Tri-Cities Blackhawks

Career highlights
- Consensus first-team All-American (1945); Consensus second-team All-American (1944); 2× All-SWC (1944, 1945); No. 16 retired by Rice Owls

Career NBA statistics
- Points: 613
- Rebounds: Not tracked
- Assists: 103
- Stats at NBA.com
- Stats at Basketball Reference

William Gambrell Henry (December 27, 1924 – January 1, 1985) was an American professional basketball player. Henry played for one season with the Fort Wayne Pistons (1948–49) in the Basketball Association of America (BAA) before splitting the following season with the Pistons and Tri-Cities Blackhawks of the National Basketball Association (NBA). He recorded career totals of 613 points and 103 assists. Although he played professionally, Henry is better known for his college basketball career at Rice University.

At Rice, Henry played three varsity seasons (1942–45). A 6 ft 9 in (2.06 m), 215 lb center, Henry was twice selected as a consensus NCAA All-American, once in 1944 and again in 1945. As a senior in 1944–45, he led the Owls to an undefeated Southwest Conference season and only lost one game all season. He scored 280 points in 12 conference games that year, good for a 23.3 points per game average. He was also one of the biggest players in the league and led Rice to Southwest Conference first-place finishes all three years he played for them. In his sophomore season of 1942–43, Rice qualified for the National Invitation Tournament (NIT), which at the time was as popular and respected as the modern day NCAA Division I men's basketball tournament. Rice would lose to the eventual tournament champion St. John's, 51–49, in the first round.

Henry was listed as Rice University's all-time greatest men's basketball player in the 2009 book ESPN College Basketball Encyclopedia: The Complete History of the Men's Game. He was also inducted into the school's athletic hall of fame as part of the 1970 class.

Bill Henry died five days after his 60th birthday.

== BAA/NBA career statistics ==
Legend
GP	Games played	FG%	Field-goal percentage
FT%	Free-throw percentage	APG	Assists per game
PPG	Points per game	**Bold**	Career high

=== Regular season ===
Year	Team	GP	FG%	FT%	APG	PPG
1948–49	Fort Wayne	32	.320	.616	**1.7**	**9.9**
1949–50	Fort Wayne	**44**	.311	**.672**	.9	4.9
1949–50	Tri-Cities	19	**.348**	.667	.5	4.3
Career		95	.320	.641	1.1	6.5

=== Playoffs ===
Year	Team	GP	FG%	FT%	APG	PPG
1950	Tri-Cities	3	.118	.556	1.7	3.0
Career		3	.118	.556	1.7	3.0
