= 1943–44 Washington State Cougars men's basketball team =

American college basketball season

1943–44 Washington State Cougars men's basketball
- Conference: Pacific Coast Conference
- Record: 8–19 (4–12 PCC)
- Head coach: Jack Friel (16th season)
- Home arena: WSC Gymnasium

1943–44 Pacific Coast Conference men's basketball standings
	Conf.				Overall
Team	W		L	PCT	W		L	PCT
North
Washington	15	–	1	.938	26	–	6	.813
Oregon	11	–	5	.688	16	–	10	.615
Idaho	5	–	11	.313	7	–	16	.304
Oregon State	5	–	11	.313	8	–	16	.333
Washington State	4	–	12	.250	8	–	19	.296
South
California	4	–	0	1.000	7	–	3	.700
UCLA	3	–	3	.500	10	–	10	.500
USC	1	–	5	.167	8	–	12	.400

The 1943–44 Washington State Cougars men's basketball team represented Washington State College for the 1943–44 college basketball season. Led by sixteenth-year head coach Jack Friel, the Cougars were members of the Pacific Coast Conference and played their home games on campus at the WSC Gymnasium in Pullman, Washington.

The Cougars were 8–19 overall in the regular season and 4–12 in conference play, last in the Northern division.
