= Herm Brunotte =

American basketball player (1921–2010)

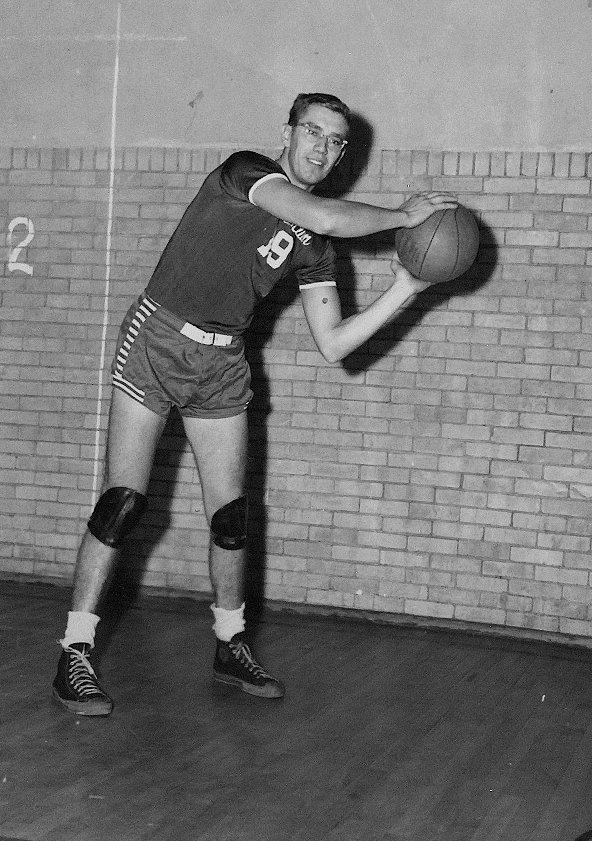
Herm Brunotte in 1948

Herman Henry "Herm" Brunotte (August 26, 1921 – March 5, 2010) was an American college and professional basketball player.

Born in Manhattan, New York, he was a star guard at Brooklyn Polytechnic until the outbreak of World War II sent him to Model City near Niagara Falls, New York, for classified work in support of the Manhattan Project. He began taking courses at nearby Canisius College in Buffalo, and joined their basketball team. In 1944, he won the team's Most Valuable Player Award for leading the school to its first berth in the eight-team National Invitation Tournament in Madison Square Garden. Brunotte scored a team-high 11 points in a 43–29 first-round loss to Oklahoma A&M on March 20, 1944, before a crowd of 16,273. The undersized Canisius team was forced to dramatically alter its shots when confronted with 7-foot center Bob Kurland, who excelled at defensive goaltending. The 1943–44 season marked the end of legal defensive goaltending in NCAA competition. Canisius finished with a win–loss record of 15–6 including a 48–43 regular season win over eventual NIT champs St. Johns. Brunotte was named a Sporting News 3rd Team All-American.

He entered the United States Army after World War II and served in counterintelligence. He was promoted to staff sergeant in February 1947 while serving at Holabird Signal Depot.

After the war, Brunotte returned to Brooklyn Polytechnic and completed his degree in chemical engineering. He had a short professional career playing for the Rochester Royals of the National Basketball League. He also assisted Van Miller during broadcasts of Buffalo Bills football games on WBEN radio.
