= 1943–44 Holy Cross Crusaders men's basketball team =

American college basketball season

1943–44 Holy Cross Crusaders men's basketball
- Conference: Independent
- Record: 6–8
- Head coach: Hop Riopel (2nd season)
- Captain: Robert Hogarty
- Home arena: N/A

The 1943–44 Holy Cross Crusaders men's basketball team represented The College of the Holy Cross during the 1943–44 NCAA men's basketball season. The head coach was Hop Riopel, coaching the Crusaders in his second season. The team finished with an overall record of 6–8.

== Schedule ==
Date time, TV	Opponent	Result	Record	Site city, state
1/08/1944*	at Harvard	W 39–23	1–0	Malkin Athletic Center; Boston, MA
1/09/1944*	Narcus Brothers	L 50–52	1–1	Worcester, MA
1/15/1944*	at Yale	L 45–49	1–2	Payne Whitney Gymnasium; New Haven, CT
1/22/1944*	at Coast Guard	L 30–33	1–3	
2/14/1944*	Narcus Brothers	W 50–45	2–3	Worcester, MA
1/29/1944*	at Tufts	L 40–50	2–4	Medford, MA
1/30/1944*	Norton Company	W 51–31	3–4	Worcester, MA
2/05/1944*	at Brown	W 40–37	4–4	Marvel Gymnasium; Providence, RI
2/06/1944*	Norton Company	L 32–51	4–5	Worcester, MA
2/09/1944*	Worcester Tech	L 47–55	4–6	Worcester, MA
2/12/1944*	at Boston C.G.	W 51–46	5–6	
2/19/1944*	at Camp Edwards	L 51–54	5–7	
3/04/1944*	at Southbridge K of C	W 59–34	6–7	
3/11/1944*	at Dartmouth	L 34–59	6–8	Alumni Gym; Hanover, NH
*Non-conference game. (#) Tournament seedings in parentheses.
