= 1943–44 Washington Huskies men's basketball team =

American college basketball season

1943–44 Washington Huskies men's basketball

PCC Northern Division Champions
- Conference: Pacific Coast Conference
- Record: 26–6 (15–1 PCC)
- Head coach: Hec Edmundson (24th season)
- Captains: Jack Nichols; Bill Morris
- Home arena: UW Pavilion

1943–44 Pacific Coast Conference men's basketball standings
	Conf.				Overall
Team	W		L	PCT	W		L	PCT
North
Washington	15	–	1	.938	26	–	6	.813
Oregon	11	–	5	.688	16	–	10	.615
Idaho	5	–	11	.313	7	–	16	.304
Oregon State	5	–	11	.313	8	–	16	.333
Washington State	4	–	12	.250	8	–	19	.296
South
California	4	–	0	1.000	7	–	3	.700
UCLA	3	–	3	.500	10	–	10	.500
USC	1	–	5	.167	8	–	12	.400

The 1943–44 Washington Huskies men's basketball team represented the University of Washington for the 1943–44 NCAA college basketball season. Led by 24th-year head coach Hec Edmundson, the Huskies were members of the Pacific Coast Conference and played their home games on campus at the UW Pavilion in Seattle, Washington.

The Huskies were 26–6 overall in the regular season and 15–1 in conference play; first in the Northern division.

Washington's only conference loss was at Idaho in the penultimate game. There was no conference playoff series this year and the Huskies did not play in the eight-team NCAA tournament.
