= Allie Paine =

American basketball player (1919–2008)

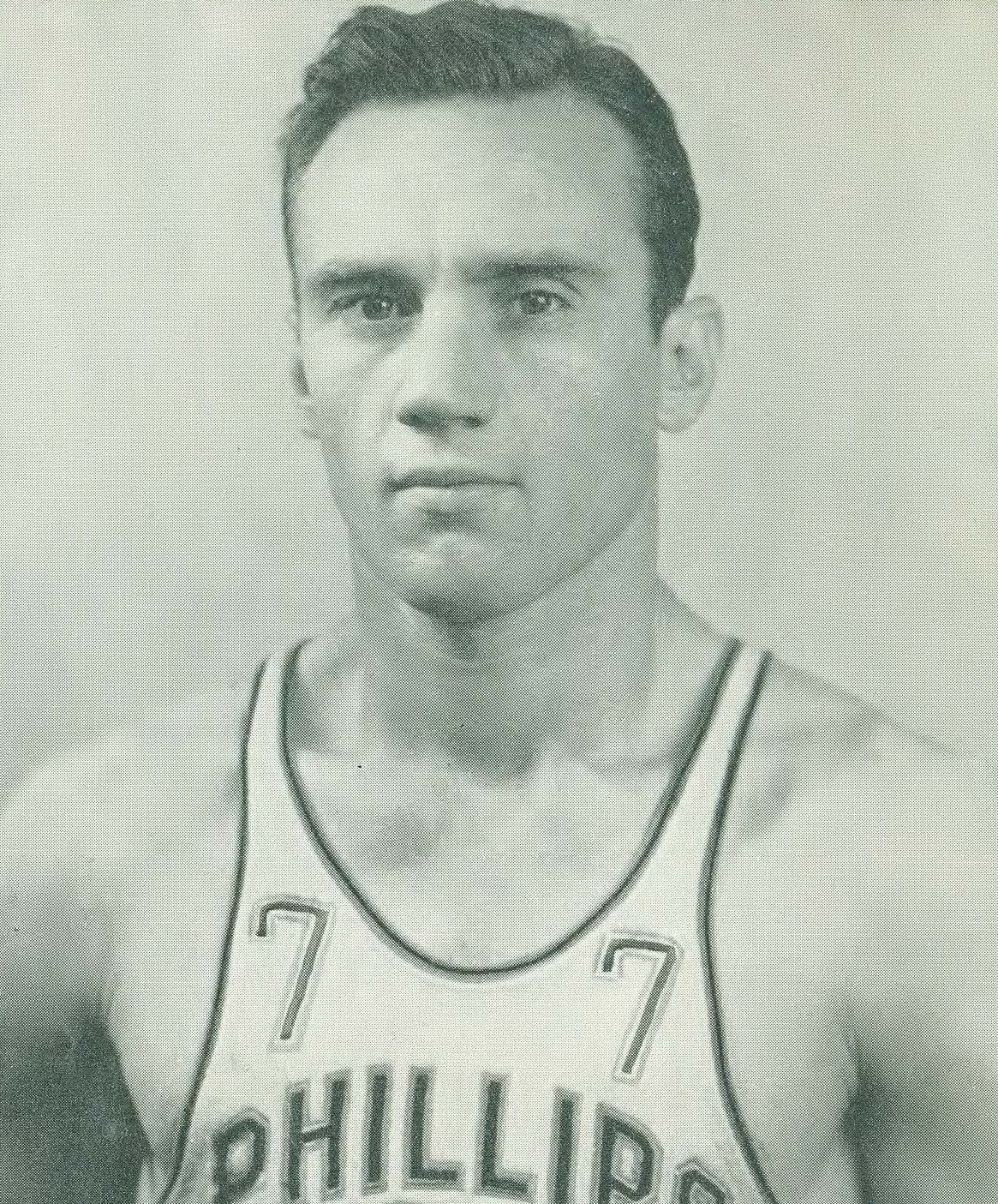
- Paine with the Phillips 66ers

Personal information
- Born: July 22, 1919
- Died: March 21, 2008 (aged 88) Norman, Oklahoma, U.S.
- Listed height: 6 ft 0 in (1.83 m)
- Listed weight: 165 lb (75 kg)

Career information
- College: Oklahoma (1940–1944, 1946–1947)
- Position: Guard
- Number: 20

Career history
- 1947–1948: Oklahoma City Drillers

Career highlights
- Consensus first-team All-American (1944); First-team All-Big Six (1944)

Alva Leon Paine (July 22, 1919 – March 21, 2008) was an American college basketball standout at the University of Oklahoma, who was named a consensus first-team All-American in 1944. In high school, Paine earned varsity letters in football, basketball and baseball, and he earned a scholarship to play for the Oklahoma Sooners men's basketball team. He played for four seasons: 1941, 1943, 1944, and 1947. He had spent two years in the United States Army before finishing his college career.

Paine, a 6 ft 0 in (1.83 m) guard, guided the Sooners to two Big Six Conference titles in 1944 and 1947. As a junior he led the conference in scoring and was named both a First Team All-Conference and consensus First Team All-American selection. In his final season of 1946–47, he helped Oklahoma reach the national championship game in the 1947 NCAA Men's Division I Basketball Tournament. The Sooners lost, however, to the Holy Cross Crusaders 58–47. Paine graduated from Oklahoma with bachelor degrees in business and education.

After college, he played for the only season in the Professional Basketball League of America's existence as a member of the Oklahoma City Drillers. He appeared in five games and scored 17 points. In 1953, Paine moved to Enid, Oklahoma with his wife and became the basketball and baseball coach at Phillips University. Two years later, he started working with Robert R. Nigh and ultimately became the president of Robert R. Nigh Associates for 35 years. Paine was very involved in church and community life. Throughout his years he served on the Enid Public Schools Board of Education, was a Boy Scouts of America troop leader, Little League baseball coach, member and president of American Business Club, and volunteered at soup kitchens with his church.

At the time of his death in March 2008, Paine was survived by his two children, six grandchildren and eight great-grandchildren (his wife had died in 1998).
