= 1944 SEC men's basketball tournament =

- Classification: Division I
- Teams: 6
- Site: Jefferson County Armory; Louisville, Kentucky
- Champions: Kentucky (6th title)
- Winning coach: Adolph Rupp (6th title)

1943–44 Southeastern Conference men's basketball standings
	Conf.				Overall
Team	W		L	PCT	W		L	PCT
Tulane	4	–	0	1.000	16	–	6	.727
Georgia Tech	2	–	0	1.000	14	–	4	.778
Georgia	0	–	2	.000	7	–	10	.412
LSU	0	–	4	.000	10	–	15	.400
Kentucky †		–		–	19	–	2	.905
Vanderbilt		–		–	12	–	3	.800
† Regular-season championship and SEC Tournament winner

The 1944 Southeastern Conference men's basketball tournament took place on March 2–3, 1944, in Louisville, Kentucky at the Jefferson County Armory. It was the eleventh SEC basketball tournament.

Kentucky won the tournament by beating Tulane in the championship game. Due to World War II, only six SEC schools fielded teams during the 1943–44 season. The Wildcats would go on to play in the 1944 NIT, losing to St. John's in the semifinals.

== Bracket ==
First Round
Georgia Tech	63
Vanderbilt	51
Kentucky	55
Georgia	29

Semifinals
Tulane	66
Georgia Tech	55
LSU	28
Kentucky	55

Finals
Tulane	46
Kentucky	62
