= Weston Mitchell =

American basketball coach

Weston Mitchell (December 8, 1890 – July 1962) was an American basketball coach. He was the head basketball coach for the Minnesota Golden Gophers for one lone season. in 1944–45. Mitchell replaced Carl Nordly as coach after Nordly had steered the Gophers to a 17–23 record over two seasons after replacing long-time coach Dave MacMillan. McMillan came back to coach the Gophers again for the 1945–46 season. The Gophers went 8–13 during Mitchell's one-year tenure, with a 4–8 record in the Big Ten Conference, which placed them in a tie for sixth place. Mitchell graduated from Wisconsin-Stout in 1913.

Before becoming a coach for the Gophers, Mitchell had been the head coach at Central High School in Minneapolis, where one of his players was John Kundla, the Hall of Fame coach, who led the Minneapolis Lakers to five National Basketball Association (NBA) titles and was later the Minnesota Gophers head coach.
