= 1943–44 Idaho Vandals men's basketball team =

American college basketball season

1943–44 Idaho Vandals men's basketball
- Conference: Pacific Coast Conference
- Record: 7–16 (5–11 PCC)
- Head coach: James "Babe" Brown (2nd season)
- Home arena: Memorial Gymnasium

1943–44 Pacific Coast Conference men's basketball standings
	Conf.				Overall
Team	W		L	PCT	W		L	PCT
North
Washington	15	–	1	.938	26	–	6	.813
Oregon	11	–	5	.688	16	–	10	.615
Idaho	5	–	11	.313	7	–	16	.304
Oregon State	5	–	11	.313	8	–	16	.333
Washington State	4	–	12	.250	8	–	19	.296
South
California	4	–	0	1.000	7	–	3	.700
UCLA	3	–	3	.500	10	–	10	.500
USC	1	–	5	.167	8	–	12	.400

The 1943–44 Idaho Vandals men's basketball team represented the University of Idaho during the 1943–44 NCAA college basketball season. Members of the Pacific Coast Conference, the Vandals were led by second-year acting head coach James "Babe" Brown and played their home games on campus at Memorial Gymnasium in Moscow, Idaho.

The Vandals were 7–16 overall in the regular season and 5–11 in conference play. In Idaho's final game of the season, they handed visiting Washington their only conference loss. Idaho swept the four games with Palouse rival Washington State, but dropped all eight to the two Oregon schools.
