= Clarence Anderson =

Clarence Anderson may refer to:

- Clarence W. Anderson (1871–1944), Canadian politician
- Clarence William Anderson (1891–1971), author and illustrator of children's books
- Bud Anderson (Clarence Emil Anderson, 1922–2024), United States Air Force officer
