= Carl Nordly =

American sports coach and educator (1901–1990)

Biographical details
- Born: August 30, 1901; Red Wing, Minnesota, U.S.
- Died: February 25, 1990 (aged 88); Falcon Heights, Minnesota, U.S.

Playing career

Football
- c. 1925: Carleton

Basketball
- c. 1925: Carleton

Baseball
- c. 1925: Carleton

Coaching career (HC unless noted)

Football
- 1926: Rochester HS (MN)

Basketball
- 1942–1944: Minnesota

Baseball
- 1935: Northern Illinois State Normal

Track and field
- 1931: Carleton

Administrative career (AD unless noted)
- 1926–1927: Rochester HS (MN)

Head coaching record
- Overall: 17–23 (college basketball)

Carl Leonard "Fat" Nordly (August 30, 1901 – February 25, 1990) was an American sports coach and educator. He served as the head basketball coach at University of Minnesota for two seasons, from 1942 to 1944.

Nordly was born in Red Wing, Minnesota, and grew up there. He attended Carleton College in Northfield, Minnesota, where he lettered in football, basketball, and baseball. Nordly began his coaching career as an assistant at Carlton before he was hired, in 1926, as athletic director and coach at Rochester High School in Rochester, Minnesota. He stepped down from his post at the high school the following year to become a district manager for Ben Franklin Business and Loan Association in Rochester. He was succeeded at Rochester High by his brother, Hon Nordly.

Nordly returned to Carleton in January 1931 as head coach of track and field. He resigned from the position that spring. In 1935, Nordly became a professor at the University of Minnesota. He earned a doctorate from Teachers College, Columbia University in 1937. Following the first retirement of Dave MacMillan in 1942, Nordly took over as head coach of the Minnesota Golden Gophers men's basketball team. He coached the team from 1942 to 1944, compiling a record of 17–23 in two seasons. Nordly's coaching style was heavily indebted to Walter Meanwell, former coach of the Wisconsin Badgers.

In 1955, Nordly was appointed the director of the Physical Education Department at the University of California, Berkeley. He retired from Berkeley in 1965, and continued to live in California until 1987. Nordly died on February 25, 1990, at his home in Falcon Heights, Minnesota.

== Head coaching record ==
=== College basketball ===
Record table
Season	Team	Overall	Conference	Standing	Postseason
Minnesota Golden Gophers (Big Ten Conference) (1942–1944)
1942–43	Minnesota	10–9	5–7	T–6th	
1943–44	Minnesota	7–14	2–10	T–8th	
Minnesota:		17–23 (.425)	7–17 (.292)		
Total:		17–23 (.425)			
