= Withrow Hall =

Historic building in Oxford, Ohio, United States

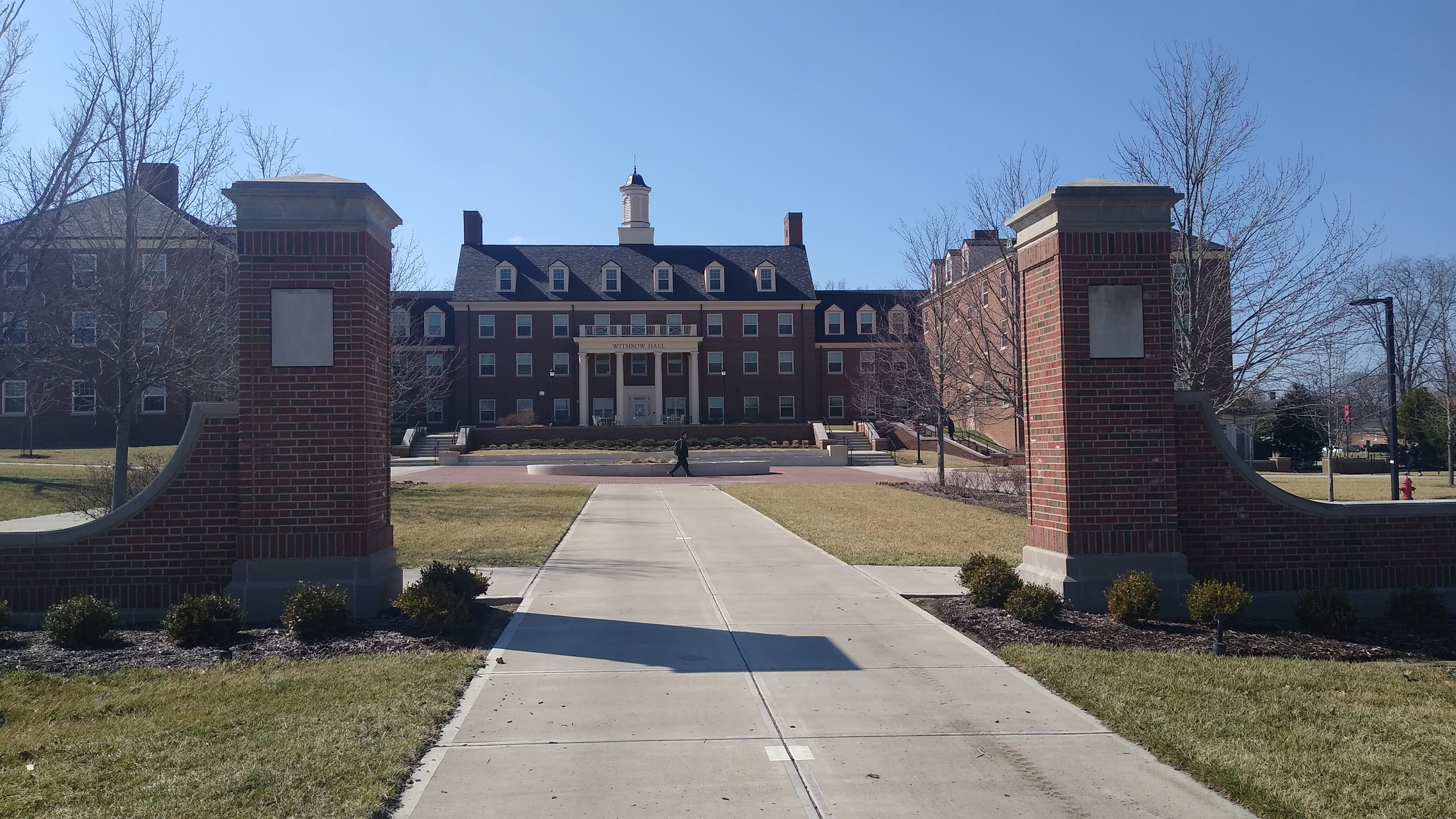
- Front view of Withrow Courts on North Campus of Miami University

- Location within Ohio

General information
- Architectural style: Georgian Style
- Location: Oxford, Ohio, United States of America
- Coordinates: 39°30′44.79″N 84°44′2.70″W
- Current tenants: Miami University men's and women's intramural sports and other activities.
- Construction started: 1931
- Inaugurated: 13 February 1932
- Demolished: 2016
- Cost: $300,000
- Client: Miami University students
- Owner: Miami University

Other information
- Seating capacity: 3500

Website
- www.rec.miamioh.edu/facilities/withrow.html

Withrow Hall is a dormitory and former gymnasium at Miami University in Oxford, Ohio. Under the name Withrow Court, the men's gymnasium was constructed in 1932 and was Miami's main athletic facility until the construction of Millett Hall in 1968. The building was repurposed as a dormitory in 2016, opening to students in the fall of 2018 under the new name of Withrow Hall. The building also housed the University Archives until its merger with the main library in 2016.

== History ==
Withrow Court was built in 1931 at a cost of approximately $300,000 from the state of Ohio. It was designated be the men's gymnasium and assembly hall, and was the main basketball arena for the university. It used to be the Main Varsity Basketball Arena. The building was dedicated on February 13, 1932, in memory of Dr. John M. Withrow, a trustee for Miami University for 46 years from 1885 until his death in Cincinnati on May 14, 1931. He was a Miami student from 1870 to 1873, and returned after earning his M.D. to teach gynecology. Withrow Court was used as the main gymnasium until Millett Hall was built in 1968. It was also home to the University Archives, which merged in 2016 with the Walter Havighurst Special Collections in King Library. The gym closed in 2016 and was repurposed and renovated as a first and second-year dormitory under the current name, which opened in the fall of 2018.

== Facilities ==
Withrow Court dedication took place in Oxford on February 13, 1932. The main gymnasium was 175 by 88 and could be divided into 3 full size courts for intramural sports or competitions, with the ability to add temporary bleachers.

The main gym consisted of three basketball/volley courts. The South Gym was the indoor tennis court and the North Gym was the gymnastic studio. There were two aerobics/combative rooms, along with eight racquetball courts, two squash courts, and two classrooms. There was balcony seating in the gyms and there were men's and women's locker rooms. The first floor of the gymnasium consists of the locker and shower rooms, the varsity, visiting and freshman team rooms, faculty and officials locker and dressing rooms, store rooms, four handball courts and two squash courts. There was also a small gymnasium used for boxing, wrestling, and fencing. The first floor also had two large classrooms and staff offices.

There was a second dedication of the building on April 6, 1966. This dedication was to show that Miami was changing their gymnasium for the better, to expand it. There were wings added onto the north, south and east ends of the building. This was in the original plans of Withrow Court, but obviously had to be spread over time.
