= 1943–44 NCAA men's basketball rankings =

- Season: 1943–44
- NCAA Tournament: 1944
- NCAA Tournament Champions: Utah
NCAA men's basketball rankings

The 1943–44 NCAA men's basketball rankings included rankings of teams by the Dunkel System and the Helms Athletic Foundation.

== Converse-Dunkel Basketball Forecast ==
The Dunkel System college basketball ratings were released throughout the season. The final post-tournament ratings were released in May 1944, with undefeated Army ahead of NCAA tournament winner Utah.

=== Leading college teams ===
	Final May 1944	
1.	Army – 76.9	1.
2.	Utah – 74.3	2.
3.	Kentucky – 73.5	3.
4.	DePaul – 72.3	4.
5.	Western Michigan – 72.2	5.
6.	Dartmouth – 71.2	6.
7.	Ohio State – 70.9	7.
8.	Illinois – 70.8	8.
9.	Notre Dame – 70.5	9.
10.	Northwestern – 69.9	10.
	Final May 1944	

== Helms Athletic Foundation ==
The Helms Athletic Foundation released its top four teams in April 1944, ranking undefeated Army above NCAA champion Utah, Kentucky, and NCAA runner-up Dartmouth.

	Final April 1944	
1.	Army	1.
2.	Utah	2.
3.	Kentucky	3.
4.	Dartmouth	4.
	Final April 1944	

== Premo Power Poll ==
In 1995, the Premo Power Poll was published in The Encyclopedia of College Basketball. Undefeated Army earned the No. 1 spot in the ranking.

	Final 1995	
1.	Army	1.
2.	Utah	2.
3.	Kentucky	3.
4.	DePaul	4.
5.	Dartmouth	5.
6.	St. John's	6.
7.	Oklahoma State	7.
8.	Bowling Green	8.
9.	Rice	9.
10.	Ohio State	10.
11.	Western Michigan	11.
12.	Iowa State	12.
13.	Gonzaga	13.
14.	Washington	14.
15.	Muhlenberg	15.
16.	Denison	16.
17.	Northwestern	17.
18.	Illinois	18.
19.	Miami (OH)	19.
20.	Navy	20.
	Final 1995	
