= List of NCAA Division I men's basketball tournament Final Four participants =

This is a list of NCAA Division I men's basketball tournament Final Four participants.

== Final Fours by year ==
From the first tournament in 1939 to 1951, the national semifinals were also considered the regional championships, with the national championship held separately a week later. During this period, the tournament was divided into the East and West Regions. From 1952 to 1955, the regional championships were held at four sites, with two designated for the East and two for the West. In 1956, the four regions were given unique names for the first time.

From 1946 to 1981, a third place consolation game was conducted before the national championship game for the losing teams of the national semifinals; the winning team was awarded third place and the losing team was awarded fourth place. In 1982, the NCAA eliminated the game and the two losing teams of the semifinal games are considered tied for third place in the official record book.

At the conclusion of the championship game, one player is awarded the Most Outstanding Player award. The MOP has been awarded to a player not on the championship team twelve times: nine times a player on the runner-up was named the MOP, twice a player on the third-place team was awarded the MOP, and once a player on the fourth-place team was awarded the MOP. Five players have won the award twice; one player, Lew Alcindor, won the award three times.

Legend
	Champion
*	Appearance vacated by NCAA

Final Four participants by year
Year	Place	Team	Conference	Seed (Note: Full seeding began in 1979)	Region	Coach	MOP
1939	Champion	Oregon	Pacific Coast (Note: The Pac-12 Conference was previously named the Pacific Coast Conference, Athletic Association of Western Universities (AAWU), Pacific-8 Conference (Pac-8), and Pacific-10 Conference (Pac-10). Although the Pacific Coast Conference operated under a separate charter from the current Pac-12, both the Pac-12 and NCAA consider the Pacific Coast Conference and Pac-12 to be the same conference.)		West	Howard Hobson	
1939	Runner-up	Ohio State	Big Ten		East	Harold Olsen	Jimmy Hull
1939	Semifinalists	Oklahoma	Big Six (Note: The Big Eight Conference was previously named the Big Seven Conference and Big Six Conference.)		West	Bruce Drake	
1939	Semifinalists	Villanova	Independent		East	Alexander Severance	
1940	Champion	Indiana	Big Ten		East	Branch McCracken	Marvin Huffman
1940	Runner-up	Kansas	Big Six		West	Phog Allen	
1940	Semifinalists	Duquesne	Independent		East	Chick Davies	
1940	Semifinalists	USC	Pacific Coast		West	Sam Barry	
1941	Champion	Wisconsin	Big Ten		East	Harold E. Foster	John Kotz
1941	Runner-up	Washington State	Pacific Coast		West	Jack Friel	
1941	Semifinalists	Arkansas	Southwest		West	Glen Rose	
1941	Semifinalists	Pittsburgh	Independent		East	Doc Carlson	
1942	Champion	Stanford	Pacific Coast		West	Everett Dean	Howie Dallmar
1942	Runner-up	Dartmouth	EIBL (Note: The Ivy League succeeded the Eastern Intercollegiate Basketball League.)		East	Osborne Cowles	
1942	Semifinalists	Colorado	Mountain States (Note: The Mountain States Athletic Conference was more popularly known as the Skyline Six and Skyline Eight at various points in its history.)		West	Frosty Cox	
1942	Semifinalists	Kentucky	Southeastern		East	Adolph Rupp	
1943	Champion	Wyoming	Mountain States		West	Everett Shelton	Ken Sailors
1943	Runner-up	Georgetown	Independent		East	Elmer Ripley	
1943	Semifinalists	DePaul	Independent		East	Ray Meyer	
1943	Semifinalists	Texas	Southwest		West	Bully Gilstrap	
1944	Champion	Utah	Mountain States		West	Vadal Peterson	Arnie Ferrin
1944	Runner-up	Dartmouth	EIBL		East	Earl Brown	
1944	Semifinalists	Iowa State	Big Six		West	Louis Menze	
1944	Semifinalists	Ohio State	Big Ten		East	Harold Olsen	
1945	Champion	Oklahoma A&M (Note: Oklahoma State University was named Oklahoma Agricultural and Mechanical College and known as Oklahoma A&M before 1957.)	Missouri Valley		West	Henry Iba	Bob Kurland
1945	Runner-up	NYU	Independent		East	Howard Cann	
1945	Semifinalists	Arkansas	Southwest		West	Eugene Lambert	
1945	Semifinalists	Ohio State	Big Ten		East	Harold Olsen	
1946	Champion	Oklahoma A&M	Missouri Valley		West	Henry Iba	Bob Kurland
1946	Runner-up	North Carolina	Southern		East	Ben Carnevale	
1946	Third Place	Ohio State	Big Ten		East	Harold Olsen	
1946	Fourth Place	California	Pacific Coast		West	Nibs Price	
1947	Champion	Holy Cross	Independent		East	Doggie Julian	George Kaftan
1947	Runner-up	Oklahoma	Big Six		West	Bruce Drake	
1947	Third Place	Texas	Southwest		West	Jack Gray	
1947	Fourth Place	CCNY	Independent		East	Nat Holman	
1948	Champion	Kentucky	Southeastern		East	Adolph Rupp	Alex Groza
1948	Runner-up	Baylor	Southwest		West	Bill Henderson	
1948	Third Place	Holy Cross	Independent		East	Doggie Julian	
1948	Fourth Place	Kansas State	Big Seven		West	Jack Gardner	
1949	Champion	Kentucky	Southeastern		East	Adolph Rupp	Alex Groza
1949	Runner-up	Oklahoma A&M	Missouri Valley		West	Henry Iba	
1949	Third Place	Illinois	Big Nine (Note: The Big Ten Conference was known as the Big Nine from the 1946–47 season to 1953–54 season.)		East	Harry Combes	
1949	Fourth Place	Oregon State	Pacific Coast		West	Slats Gill	
1950	Champion	CCNY	Independent		East	Nat Holman	Irwin Dambrot
1950	Runner-up	Bradley	Missouri Valley		West	Forddy Anderson	
1950	Third Place	NC State	Southern		East	Everett Case	
1950	Fourth Place	Baylor	Southwest		West	Bill Henderson	
1951	Champion	Kentucky	Southeastern		East	Adolph Rupp	Bill Spivey (Note: The MOP was not officially awarded after the 1951 championship game. However, the NCAA lists Bill Spivey as the winner of the 1951 MOP in its official record book.)
1951	Runner-up	Kansas State	Big Seven		West	Jack Gardner	
1951	Third Place	Illinois	Big Nine		East	Harry Combes	
1951	Fourth Place	Oklahoma A&M	Missouri Valley		West	Henry Iba	
1952	Champion	Kansas	Big Seven		West-1	Phog Allen	Clyde Lovellette
1952	Runner-up	St. John's	Independent		East-1	Frank McGuire	
1952	Third Place	Illinois	Big Nine		East-2	Harry Combes	
1952	Fourth Place	Santa Clara	Independent		West-2	Bob Feerick	
1953	Champion	Indiana	Big Nine		East-2	Branch McCracken	
1953	Runner-up	Kansas	Big Seven		West-1	Phog Allen	B. H. Born
1953	Third Place	Washington	Pacific Coast		West-2	Tippy Dye	
1953	Fourth Place	LSU	Southeastern		East-1	Harry Rabenhorst	
1954	Champion	La Salle	Independent		East-1	Ken Loeffler	Tom Gola
1954	Runner-up	Bradley	Independent		West-1	Forddy Anderson	
1954	Third Place	Penn State	Independent		East-2	Elmer Gross	
1954	Fourth Place	USC	Pacific Coast		West-2	Forrest Twogood	
1955	Champion	San Francisco	CBA (Note: The West Coast Conference was previously named the California Basketball Association and West Coast Athletic Conference.)		West-2	Phil Woolpert	Bill Russell
1955	Runner-up	La Salle	Independent		East-1	Ken Loeffler	
1955	Third Place	Colorado	Big Seven		West-1	Bebe Lee	
1955	Fourth Place	Iowa	Big Ten		East-2	Bucky O'Connor	
1956	Champion	San Francisco	West Coast Athletic		Far West	Phil Woolpert	
1956	Runner-up	Iowa	Big Ten		Midwest	Bucky O'Connor	
1956	Third Place	Temple	Independent		East	Harry Litwack	Hal Lear
1956	Fourth Place	SMU	Southwest		West	Doc Hayes	
1957	Champion	North Carolina	Atlantic Coast		East	Frank McGuire	
1957	Runner-up	Kansas	Big Seven		Midwest	Dick Harp	Wilt Chamberlain
1957	Third Place	San Francisco	West Coast Athletic		West	Phil Woolpert	
1957	Fourth Place	Michigan State	Big Ten		Mideast	Forddy Anderson	
1958	Champion	Kentucky	Southeastern		Mideast	Adolph Rupp	
1958	Runner-up	Seattle	Independent		West	John Castellani	Elgin Baylor
1958	Third Place	Temple	Independent		East	Harry Litwack	
1958	Fourth Place	Kansas State	Big Seven		Midwest	Tex Winter	
1959	Champion	California	Pacific Coast		West	Pete Newell	
1959	Runner-up	West Virginia	Southern		East	Fred Schaus	Jerry West
1959	Third Place	Cincinnati	Missouri Valley		Midwest	George Smith	
1959	Fourth Place	Louisville	Independent		Mideast	Bernard Hickman	
1960	Champion	Ohio State	Big Ten		Mideast	Fred Taylor	Jerry Lucas
1960	Runner-up	California	AAWU		West	Pete Newell	
1960	Third Place	Cincinnati	Missouri Valley		Midwest	George Smith	
1960	Fourth Place	NYU	Independent		East	Lou Rossini	
1961	Champion	Cincinnati	Missouri Valley		Midwest	Ed Jucker	
1961	Runner-up	Ohio State	Big Ten		Mideast	Fred Taylor	Jerry Lucas
1961	Third Place	Saint Joseph's*	Middle Atlantic (Note: The East Coast Conference was previously named the Middle Atlantic Conference.)		East	Jack Ramsay	
1961	Fourth Place	Utah	Skyline Eight		West	Jack Gardner	
1962	Champion	Cincinnati	Missouri Valley		Midwest	Ed Jucker	Paul Hogue
1962	Runner-up	Ohio State	Big Ten		Mideast	Fred Taylor	
1962	Third Place	Wake Forest	Atlantic Coast		East	Bones McKinney	
1962	Fourth Place	UCLA	AAWU		West	John Wooden	
1963	Champion	Loyola Chicago	Independent		Mideast	George Ireland	
1963	Runner-up	Cincinnati	Missouri Valley		Midwest	Ed Jucker	Art Heyman
1963	Third Place	Duke	Atlantic Coast		East	Vic Bubas	
1963	Fourth Place	Oregon State	Independent		West	Slats Gill	
1964	Champion	UCLA	AAWU		West	John Wooden	Walt Hazzard
1964	Runner-up	Duke	Atlantic Coast		East	Vic Bubas	
1964	Third Place	Michigan	Big Ten		Mideast	Dave Strack	
1964	Fourth Place	Kansas State	Big Eight		Midwest	Tex Winter	
1965	Champion	UCLA	AAWU		West	John Wooden	
1965	Runner-up	Michigan	Big Ten		Mideast	Dave Strack	
1965	Third Place	Princeton	Ivy League		East	Butch van Breda Kolff	Bill Bradley
1965	Fourth Place	Wichita State	Missouri Valley		Midwest	Gary Thompson	
1966	Champion	Texas Western (Note: The University of Texas at El Paso (UTEP) was named Texas Western College before 1967.)	Independent		Midwest	Don Haskins	
1966	Runner-up	Kentucky	Southeastern		Mideast	Adolph Rupp	
1966	Third Place	Duke	Atlantic Coast		East	Vic Bubas	
1966	Fourth Place	Utah	Western Athletic		West	Jack Gardner	Jerry Chambers
1967	Champion	UCLA	AAWU		West	John Wooden	Lew Alcindor
1967	Runner-up	Dayton	Independent		Mideast	Don Donoher	
1967	Third Place	Houston	Independent		Midwest	Guy Lewis	
1967	Fourth Place	North Carolina	Atlantic Coast		East	Dean Smith	
1968	Champion	UCLA	AAWU		West	John Wooden	Lew Alcindor
1968	Runner-up	North Carolina	Atlantic Coast		East	Dean Smith	
1968	Third Place	Ohio State	Big Ten		Mideast	Fred Taylor	
1968	Fourth Place	Houston	Independent		Midwest	Guy Lewis	
1969	Champion	UCLA	Pacific-8		West	John Wooden	Lew Alcindor
1969	Runner-up	Purdue	Big Ten		Mideast	George King	
1969	Third Place	Drake	Missouri Valley		Midwest	Maury John	
1969	Fourth Place	North Carolina	Atlantic Coast		East	Dean Smith	
1970	Champion	UCLA	Pacific-8		West	John Wooden	Sidney Wicks
1970	Runner-up	Jacksonville	Independent		Mideast	Joe Williams	
1970	Third Place	New Mexico State	Independent		Midwest	Lou Henson	
1970	Fourth Place	St. Bonaventure	Independent		East	Larry Weise	
1971	Champion	UCLA	Pacific-8		West	John Wooden	
1971	Runner-up	Villanova*	Independent		East	Jack Kraft	Howard Porter*
1971	Third Place	Western Kentucky*	Ohio Valley		Mideast	John Oldham	
1971	Fourth Place	Kansas	Big Eight		Midwest	Ted Owens	
1972	Champion	UCLA	Pacific-8		West	John Wooden	Bill Walton
1972	Runner-up	Florida State	Independent		Mideast	Hugh Durham	
1972	Third Place	North Carolina	Atlantic Coast		East	Dean Smith	
1972	Fourth Place	Louisville	Missouri Valley		Midwest	Denny Crum	
1973	Champion	UCLA	Pacific-8		West	John Wooden	Bill Walton
1973	Runner-up	Memphis State (Note: The University of Memphis was named Memphis State University before 1995.)	Missouri Valley		Midwest	Gene Bartow	
1973	Third Place	Indiana	Big Ten		Mideast	Bob Knight	
1973	Fourth Place	Providence	Independent		East	Dave Gavitt	
1974	Champion	NC State	Atlantic Coast		East	Norm Sloan	David Thompson
1974	Runner-up	Marquette	Independent		Mideast	Al McGuire	
1974	Third Place	UCLA	Pacific-8		West	John Wooden	
1974	Fourth Place	Kansas	Big Eight		Midwest	Ted Owens	
1975	Champion	UCLA	Pacific-8		West	John Wooden	Richard Washington
1975	Runner-up	Kentucky	Southeastern		Mideast	Joe B. Hall	
1975	Third Place	Louisville	Missouri Valley		Midwest	Denny Crum	
1975	Fourth Place	Syracuse	Independent (Note: Syracuse qualified for the tournament via the ECAC Upstate tournament.)		East	Roy Danforth	
1976	Champion	Indiana	Big Ten		Mideast	Bob Knight	Kent Benson
1976	Runner-up	Michigan	Big Ten		Midwest	Johnny Orr	
1976	Third Place	UCLA	Pacific-8		West	Gene Bartow	
1976	Fourth Place	Rutgers	Independent (Note: Rutgers qualified for the tournament via the ECAC Metro tournament.)		East	Tom Young	
1977	Champion	Marquette	Independent		Midwest	Al McGuire	Butch Lee
1977	Runner-up	North Carolina	Atlantic Coast		East	Dean Smith	
1977	Third Place	UNLV	Independent		West	Jerry Tarkanian	
1977	Fourth Place	UNC Charlotte (Note: Charlotte was branded as UNC Charlotte during its 1977 appearance.)	Sun Belt		Mideast	Lee Rose	
1978	Champion	Kentucky	Southeastern	2Q (Note: In the 1978 tournament teams were seeded in two pools of automatic qualifiers (Q) and at-large teams (L). Each region had seeds 1Q–4Q and 1L–4L.)	Mideast	Joe B. Hall	Jack Givens
1978	Runner-up	Duke	Atlantic Coast	1Q	East	Bill Foster	
1978	Third Place	Arkansas	Southwest	2L	West	Eddie Sutton	
1978	Fourth Place	Notre Dame	Independent	2L	Midwest	Digger Phelps	
1979	Champion	Michigan State	Big Ten	2	Mideast	Jud Heathcote	Earvin Johnson
1979	Runner-up	Indiana State	Missouri Valley	1	Midwest	Bill Hodges	
1979	Third Place	DePaul	Independent	2	West	Ray Meyer	
1979	Fourth Place	Penn	Ivy League	9	East	Bob Weinhauer	
1980	Champion	Louisville	Metro	2	Midwest	Denny Crum	Darrell Griffith
1980	Runner-up	UCLA*	Pacific-8	8	West	Larry Brown	
1980	Third Place	Purdue	Big Ten	6	Mideast	Lee Rose	
1980	Fourth Place	Iowa	Big Ten	5	East	Lute Olson	
1981	Champion	Indiana	Big Ten	3	Mideast	Bob Knight	Isiah Thomas
1981	Runner-up	North Carolina	Atlantic Coast	2	West	Dean Smith	
1981	Third Place	Virginia	Atlantic Coast	1	East	Terry Holland	
1981	Fourth Place	LSU	Southeastern	1	Midwest	Dale Brown	
1982	Champion	North Carolina	Atlantic Coast	1	East	Dean Smith	James Worthy
1982	Runner-up	Georgetown	Big East	1	West	John Thompson	
1982	Semifinalists	Houston	Southwest	6	Midwest	Guy Lewis	
1982	Semifinalists	Louisville	Metro	3	Mideast	Denny Crum	
1983	Champion	NC State	Atlantic Coast	6	West	Jim Valvano	
1983	Runner-up	Houston	Southwest	1	Midwest	Guy Lewis	Akeem Olajuwon
1983	Semifinalists	Georgia	Southeastern	4	East	Hugh Durham	
1983	Semifinalists	Louisville	Metro	1	Mideast	Denny Crum	
1984	Champion	Georgetown	Big East	1	West	John Thompson	Patrick Ewing
1984	Runner-up	Houston	Southwest	2	Midwest	Guy Lewis	
1984	Semifinalists	Kentucky	Southeastern	1	Mideast	Joe B. Hall	
1984	Semifinalists	Virginia	Atlantic Coast	7	East	Terry Holland	
1985	Champion	Villanova	Big East	8	Southeast	Rollie Massimino	Ed Pinckney
1985	Runner-up	Georgetown	Big East	1	East	John Thompson	
1985	Semifinalists	Memphis State*	Metro	2	Midwest	Dana Kirk	
1985	Semifinalists	St. John's	Big East	1	West	Lou Carnesecca	
1986	Champion	Louisville	Metro	2	West	Denny Crum	Pervis Ellison
1986	Runner-up	Duke	Atlantic Coast	1	East	Mike Krzyzewski	
1986	Semifinalists	Kansas	Big Eight	1	Midwest	Larry Brown	
1986	Semifinalists	LSU	Southeastern	11	Southeast	Dale Brown	
1987	Champion	Indiana	Big Ten	1	Midwest	Bob Knight	Keith Smart
1987	Runner-up	Syracuse	Big East	2	East	Jim Boeheim	
1987	Semifinalists	Providence	Big East	6	Southeast	Rick Pitino	
1987	Semifinalists	UNLV	Big West	1	West	Jerry Tarkanian	
1988	Champion	Kansas	Big Eight	6	Midwest	Larry Brown	Danny Manning
1988	Runner-up	Oklahoma	Big Eight	1	Southeast	Billy Tubbs	
1988	Semifinalists	Arizona	Pacific-10	1	West	Lute Olson	
1988	Semifinalists	Duke	Atlantic Coast	2	East	Mike Krzyzewski	
1989	Champion	Michigan	Big Ten	3	Southeast	Steve Fisher	Glen Rice
1989	Runner-up	Seton Hall	Big East	3	West	P. J. Carlesimo	
1989	Semifinalists	Duke	Atlantic Coast	2	East	Mike Krzyzewski	
1989	Semifinalists	Illinois	Big Ten	1	Midwest	Lou Henson	
1990	Champion	UNLV	Big West	1	West	Jerry Tarkanian	Anderson Hunt
1990	Runner-up	Duke	Atlantic Coast	3	East	Mike Krzyzewski	
1990	Semifinalists	Arkansas	Southwest	4	Midwest	Nolan Richardson	
1990	Semifinalists	Georgia Tech	Atlantic Coast	4	Southeast	Bobby Cremins	
1991	Champion	Duke	Atlantic Coast	2	Midwest	Mike Krzyzewski	Christian Laettner
1991	Runner-up	Kansas	Big Eight	3	Southeast	Roy Williams	
1991	Semifinalists	North Carolina	Atlantic Coast	1	East	Dean Smith	
1991	Semifinalists	UNLV	Big West	1	West	Jerry Tarkanian	
1992	Champion	Duke	Atlantic Coast	1	East	Mike Krzyzewski	Bobby Hurley
1992	Runner-up	Michigan*	Big Ten	6	Southeast	Steve Fisher	
1992	Semifinalists	Cincinnati	Great Midwest	4	Midwest	Bob Huggins	
1992	Semifinalists	Indiana	Big Ten	2	West	Bob Knight	
1993	Champion	North Carolina	Atlantic Coast	1	East	Dean Smith	Donald Williams
1993	Runner-up	Michigan*	Big Ten	1	West	Steve Fisher	
1993	Semifinalists	Kansas	Big Eight	2	Midwest	Roy Williams	
1993	Semifinalists	Kentucky	Southeastern	1	Southeast	Rick Pitino	
1994	Champion	Arkansas	Southeastern	1	Midwest	Nolan Richardson	Corliss Williamson
1994	Runner-up	Duke	Atlantic Coast	2	Southeast	Mike Krzyzewski	
1994	Semifinalists	Arizona	Pacific-10	2	West	Lute Olson	
1994	Semifinalists	Florida	Southeastern	3	East	Lon Kruger	
1995	Champion	UCLA	Pacific-10	1	West	Jim Harrick	Ed O'Bannon
1995	Runner-up	Arkansas	Southeastern	2	Midwest	Nolan Richardson	
1995	Semifinalists	North Carolina	Atlantic Coast	2	Southeast	Dean Smith	
1995	Semifinalists	Oklahoma State	Big Eight	4	East	Eddie Sutton	
1996	Champion	Kentucky	Southeastern	1	Midwest	Rick Pitino	Tony Delk
1996	Runner-up	Syracuse	Big East	4	West	Jim Boeheim	
1996	Semifinalists	Mississippi State	Southeastern	5	Southeast	Richard Williams	
1996	Semifinalists	UMass*	Atlantic 10	1	East	John Calipari	
1997	Champion	Arizona	Pacific-10	4	Southeast	Lute Olson	Miles Simon
1997	Runner-up	Kentucky	Southeastern	1	West	Rick Pitino	
1997	Semifinalists	Minnesota*	Big Ten	1	Midwest	Clem Haskins	
1997	Semifinalists	North Carolina	Atlantic Coast	1	East	Dean Smith	
1998	Champion	Kentucky	Southeastern	2	South	Tubby Smith	Jeff Sheppard
1998	Runner-up	Utah	Western Athletic	3	West	Rick Majerus	
1998	Semifinalists	North Carolina	Atlantic Coast	1	East	Bill Guthridge	
1998	Semifinalists	Stanford	Pacific-10	3	Midwest	Mike Montgomery	
1999	Champion	Connecticut (Note: UConn was officially known as Connecticut before 2013 when it adopted the short form as its official athletic brand name.)	Big East	1	West	Jim Calhoun	Richard Hamilton
1999	Runner-up	Duke	Atlantic Coast	1	East	Mike Krzyzewski	
1999	Semifinalists	Michigan State	Big Ten	1	Midwest	Tom Izzo	
1999	Semifinalists	Ohio State*	Big Ten	4	South	Jim O'Brien	
2000	Champion	Michigan State	Big Ten	1	Midwest	Tom Izzo	Mateen Cleaves
2000	Runner-up	Florida	Southeastern	5	East	Billy Donovan	
2000	Semifinalists	North Carolina	Atlantic Coast	8	South	Bill Guthridge	
2000	Semifinalists	Wisconsin	Big Ten	8	West	Dick Bennett	
2001	Champion	Duke	Atlantic Coast	1	East	Mike Krzyzewski	Shane Battier
2001	Runner-up	Arizona	Pacific-10	2	Midwest	Lute Olson	
2001	Semifinalists	Maryland	Atlantic Coast	3	West	Gary Williams	
2001	Semifinalists	Michigan State	Big Ten	1	South	Tom Izzo	
2002	Champion	Maryland	Atlantic Coast	1	East	Gary Williams	Juan Dixon
2002	Runner-up	Indiana	Big Ten	5	South	Mike Davis	
2002	Semifinalists	Kansas	Big 12	1	Midwest	Roy Williams	
2002	Semifinalists	Oklahoma	Big 12	2	West	Kelvin Sampson	
2003	Champion	Syracuse	Big East	3	East	Jim Boeheim	Carmelo Anthony
2003	Runner-up	Kansas	Big 12	2	West	Roy Williams	
2003	Semifinalists	Marquette	Conference USA	3	Midwest	Tom Crean	
2003	Semifinalists	Texas	Big 12	1	South	Rick Barnes	
2004	Champion	Connecticut	Big East	2	Phoenix	Jim Calhoun	Emeka Okafor
2004	Runner-up	Georgia Tech	Atlantic Coast	3	St. Louis	Paul Hewitt	
2004	Semifinalists	Duke	Atlantic Coast	1	Atlanta	Mike Krzyzewski	
2004	Semifinalists	Oklahoma State	Big 12	2	East Rutherford	Eddie Sutton	
2005	Champion	North Carolina	Atlantic Coast	1	Syracuse	Roy Williams	Sean May
2005	Runner-up	Illinois	Big Ten	1	Chicago	Bruce Weber	
2005	Semifinalists	Louisville	Conference USA	4	Albuquerque	Rick Pitino	
2005	Semifinalists	Michigan State	Big Ten	5	Austin	Tom Izzo	
2006	Champion	Florida	Southeastern	3	Minneapolis	Billy Donovan	Joakim Noah
2006	Runner-up	UCLA	Pacific-10	2	Oakland	Ben Howland	
2006	Semifinalists	George Mason	Colonial	11	Washington, D.C.	Jim Larrañaga	
2006	Semifinalists	LSU	Southeastern	4	Atlanta	John Brady	
2007	Champion	Florida	Southeastern	1	Midwest	Billy Donovan	Corey Brewer
2007	Runner-up	Ohio State	Big Ten	1	South	Thad Matta	
2007	Semifinalists	Georgetown	Big East	2	East	John Thompson III	
2007	Semifinalists	UCLA	Pacific-10	2	West	Ben Howland	
2008	Champion	Kansas	Big 12	1	Midwest	Bill Self	Mario Chalmers
2008	Runner-up	Memphis*	Conference USA	1	South	John Calipari	
2008	Semifinalists	North Carolina	Atlantic Coast	1	East	Roy Williams	
2008	Semifinalists	UCLA	Pacific-10	1	West	Ben Howland	
2009	Champion	North Carolina	Atlantic Coast	1	South	Roy Williams	Wayne Ellington
2009	Runner-up	Michigan State	Big Ten	2	Midwest	Tom Izzo	
2009	Semifinalists	Connecticut	Big East	1	West	Jim Calhoun	
2009	Semifinalists	Villanova	Big East	3	East	Jay Wright	
2010	Champion	Duke	Atlantic Coast	1	South	Mike Krzyzewski	Kyle Singler
2010	Runner-up	Butler	Horizon	5	West	Brad Stevens	
2010	Semifinalists	Michigan State	Big Ten	5	Midwest	Tom Izzo	
2010	Semifinalists	West Virginia	Big East	2	East	Bob Huggins	
2011	Champion	Connecticut	Big East	3	West	Jim Calhoun	Kemba Walker
2011	Runner-up	Butler	Horizon	8	Southeast	Brad Stevens	
2011	Semifinalists	Kentucky	Southeastern	4	East	John Calipari	
2011	Semifinalists	VCU	Colonial	11	Southwest	Shaka Smart	
2012	Champion	Kentucky	Southeastern	1	South	John Calipari	Anthony Davis
2012	Runner-up	Kansas	Big 12	2	Midwest	Bill Self	
2012	Semifinalists	Louisville*	Big East	4	West	Rick Pitino	
2012	Semifinalists	Ohio State	Big Ten	2	East	Thad Matta	
2013	Champion	Louisville*	Big East	1	Midwest	Rick Pitino	Luke Hancock (Note: The NCAA allowed Luke Hancock to retain his Most Outstanding Player award as part of a settlement.)
2013	Runner-up	Michigan	Big Ten	4	South	John Beilein	
2013	Semifinalists	Syracuse	Big East	4	East	Jim Boeheim	
2013	Semifinalists	Wichita State	Missouri Valley	9	West	Gregg Marshall	
2014	Champion	UConn	American	7	East	Kevin Ollie	Shabazz Napier
2014	Runner-up	Kentucky	Southeastern	8	Midwest	John Calipari	
2014	Semifinalists	Florida	Southeastern	1	South	Billy Donovan	
2014	Semifinalists	Wisconsin	Big Ten	2	West	Bo Ryan	
2015	Champion	Duke	Atlantic Coast	1	South	Mike Krzyzewski	Tyus Jones
2015	Runner-up	Wisconsin	Big Ten	1	West	Bo Ryan	
2015	Semifinalists	Kentucky	Southeastern	1	Midwest	John Calipari	
2015	Semifinalists	Michigan State	Big Ten	7	East	Tom Izzo	
2016	Champion	Villanova	Big East	2	South	Jay Wright	Ryan Arcidiacono
2016	Runner-up	North Carolina	Atlantic Coast	1	East	Roy Williams	
2016	Semifinalists	Oklahoma	Big 12	2	West	Lon Kruger	
2016	Semifinalists	Syracuse	Atlantic Coast	10	Midwest	Jim Boeheim	
2017	Champion	North Carolina	Atlantic Coast	1	South	Roy Williams	Joel Berry II
2017	Runner-up	Gonzaga	West Coast	1	West	Mark Few	
2017	Semifinalists	Oregon	Pac-12	3	Midwest	Dana Altman	
2017	Semifinalists	South Carolina	Southeastern	7	East	Frank Martin	
2018	Champion	Villanova	Big East	1	East	Jay Wright	Donte DiVincenzo
2018	Runner-up	Michigan	Big Ten	3	West	John Beilein	
2018	Semifinalists	Kansas*	Big 12	1	Midwest	Bill Self	
2018	Semifinalists	Loyola Chicago	Missouri Valley	11	South	Porter Moser	
2019	Champion	Virginia	Atlantic Coast	1	South	Tony Bennett	Kyle Guy
2019	Runner-up	Texas Tech	Big 12	3	West	Chris Beard	
2019	Semifinalists	Auburn	Southeastern	5	Midwest	Bruce Pearl	
2019	Semifinalists	Michigan State	Big Ten	2	East	Tom Izzo	
2020		Canceled due to the COVID-19 pandemic					
2021	Champion	Baylor	Big 12	1	South	Scott Drew	Jared Butler
2021	Runner-up	Gonzaga	West Coast	1	West	Mark Few	
2021	Semifinalists	Houston	American	2	Midwest	Kelvin Sampson	
2021	Semifinalists	UCLA	Pac-12	11	East	Mick Cronin	
2022	Champion	Kansas	Big 12	1	Midwest	Bill Self	Ochai Agbaji
2022	Runner-up	North Carolina	Atlantic Coast	8	East	Hubert Davis	
2022	Semifinalists	Duke	Atlantic Coast	2	West	Mike Krzyzewski	
2022	Semifinalists	Villanova	Big East	2	South	Jay Wright	
2023	Champion	UConn	Big East	4	West	Dan Hurley	Adama Sanogo
2023	Runner-up	San Diego State	Mountain West	5	South	Brian Dutcher	
2023	Semifinalists	Miami (FL)	Atlantic Coast	5	Midwest	Jim Larrañaga	
2023	Semifinalists	Florida Atlantic	Conference USA	9	East	Dusty May	
2024	Champion	UConn	Big East	1	East	Dan Hurley	Tristen Newton
2024	Runner-up	Purdue	Big Ten	1	Midwest	Matt Painter	
2024	Semifinalists	Alabama	Southeastern	4	West	Nate Oats	
2024	Semifinalists	NC State	Atlantic Coast	11	South	Kevin Keatts	
2025	Champion	Florida	Southeastern	1	West	Todd Golden	Walter Clayton Jr.
2025	Runner-up	Houston	Big 12	1	Midwest	Kelvin Sampson	
2025	Semifinalists	Duke	Atlantic Coast	1	East	Jon Scheyer	
2025	Semifinalists	Auburn	Southeastern	1	South	Bruce Pearl	
2026	Champion	Michigan	Big Ten	1	Midwest	Dusty May	Elliot Cadeau
2026	Runner-up	UConn	Big East	2	East	Dan Hurley	
2026	Semifinalists	Arizona	Big 12	1	West	Tommy Lloyd	
2026	Semifinalists	Illinois	Big Ten	3	South	Brad Underwood	

== Final Four appearances by school ==
Since 1939, 99 schools have appeared in at least one Final Four. Of those schools, four have had their only appearance vacated: Minnesota, Saint Joseph's, UMass, and Western Kentucky.

Legend
Year	Won National Championship
Year	Lost National Championship Game
Year	Won National Third Place Game
*	Appearance vacated by NCAA

Final Four appearances by school
School	Appearances	Years
Alabama	1	2024
Arizona	5	1988, 1994, 1997, 2001, 2026
Arkansas	6	1941, 1945, 1978, 1990, 1994, 1995
Auburn	2	2019, 2025
Baylor	3	1948, 1950, 2021
Bradley	2	1950, 1954
Butler	2	2009, 2010
California	3	1946, 1959, 1960
CCNY	2	1947, 1950
Charlotte	1	1977
Cincinnati	6	1959, 1960, 1961, 1962, 1963, 1992
Colorado	2	1942, 1955
Dartmouth	2	1942, 1944
Dayton	1	1967
DePaul	2	1943, 1979
Drake	1	1969
Duke	18	1963, 1964, 1966, 1978, 1986, 1988, 1989, 1990, 1991, 1992, 1994, 1999, 2001, 2004, 2010, 2015, 2022, 2025
Duquesne	1	1940
Florida	6	1994, 2000, 2006, 2007, 2014, 2025
Florida Atlantic	1	2023
Florida State	1	1972
George Mason	1	2006
Georgetown	5	1943, 1982, 1984, 1985, 2007
Georgia	1	1983
Georgia Tech	2	1990, 2004
Gonzaga	2	2017, 2021
Holy Cross	2	1947, 1948
Houston	7	1967, 1968, 1982, 1983, 1984, 2021, 2025
Illinois	6	1949, 1951, 1952, 1989, 2005, 2026
Indiana	8	1940, 1953, 1973, 1976, 1981, 1987, 1992, 2002
Indiana State	1	1979
Iowa	3	1955, 1956, 1980
Iowa State	1	1944
Jacksonville	1	1970
Kansas	15 (16*)	1940, 1952, 1953, 1957, 1971, 1974, 1986, 1988, 1991, 1993, 2002, 2003, 2008, 2012, 2018*, 2022
Kansas State	4	1948, 1951, 1958, 1964
Kentucky	17	1942, 1948, 1949, 1951, 1958, 1966, 1975, 1978, 1984, 1993, 1996, 1997, 1998, 2011, 2012, 2014, 2015
La Salle	2	1954, 1955
Louisville	8 (10*)	1959, 1972, 1975, 1980, 1982, 1983, 1986, 2005, 2012*, 2013*
Loyola Chicago	2	1963, 2018
LSU	4	1953, 1981, 1986, 2006
Marquette	3	1974, 1977, 2003
Maryland	2	2001, 2002
Memphis	1 (3*)	1973, 1985*, 2008*
Miami (FL)	1	2023
Michigan	7 (9*)	1964, 1965, 1976, 1989, 1992*, 1993*, 2013, 2018, 2026
Michigan State	10	1957, 1979, 1999, 2000, 2001, 2005, 2009, 2010, 2015, 2019
Minnesota	0 (1*)	1997*
Mississippi State	1	1996
NC State	4	1950, 1974, 1983, 2024
New Mexico State	1	1970
North Carolina	21	1946, 1957, 1967, 1968, 1969, 1972, 1977, 1981, 1982, 1991, 1993, 1995, 1997, 1998, 2000, 2005, 2008, 2009, 2016, 2017, 2022
Notre Dame	1	1978
NYU	2	1945, 1960
Ohio State	10 (11*)	1939, 1944, 1945, 1946, 1960, 1961, 1962, 1968, 1999*, 2007, 2012
Oklahoma	5	1939, 1947, 2002, 1988, 2016
Oklahoma State	6	1945, 1946, 1949, 1951, 1995, 2004
Oregon	2	1939, 2017
Oregon State	2	1949, 1963
Penn	1	1979
Penn State	1	1954
Pittsburgh	1	1941
Princeton	1	1965
Providence	2	1973, 1987
Purdue	3	1969, 1980, 2024
Rutgers	1	1976
St. Bonaventure	1	1970
St. John's	2	1952, 1985
Saint Joseph's	0 (1*)	1961*
San Diego State	1	2023
San Francisco	3	1955, 1956 1957
Santa Clara	1	1952
Seattle	1	1958
Seton Hall	1	1989
SMU	1	1956
South Carolina	1	2017
Stanford	2	1942, 1998
Syracuse	6	1975, 1987, 1996, 2003, 2013, 2016
Temple	2	1956, 1958
Texas	3	1943, 1947, 2003
Texas Tech	1	2019
UCLA	18 (19*)	1962, 1964, 1965, 1967, 1968, 1969, 1970, 1971, 1972, 1973, 1974, 1975, 1976, 1980*, 1995, 2006, 2007, 2008, 2021
UConn	8	1999, 2004, 2009, 2011, 2014, 2023, 2024, 2026
UMass	0 (1*)	1996*
UNLV	4	1977, 1987, 1990, 1991
USC	2	1940, 1954
Utah	4	1944, 1961, 1966, 1998
UTEP	1	1966
VCU	1	2011
Villanova	6 (7*)	1939, 1971*, 1985, 2009, 2016, 2018, 2022
Virginia	3	1981, 1984, 2019
Wake Forest	1	1962
Washington	1	1953
Washington State	1	1941
West Virginia	2	1959, 2010
Western Kentucky	0 (1*)	1971*
Wichita State	2	1965, 2013
Wisconsin	4	1941, 2000, 2014, 2015
Wyoming	1	1943

=== Teams appearing in consecutive Final Fours ===
Teams have appeared in the Final Four in consecutive tournaments 42 times. A total of 26 different programs have had consecutive Final Four appearances. Of those schools, two have had their only consecutive appearances vacated.

Legend
Year	Won National Championship
Year	Lost National Championship Game
Year	Won National Third Place Game
*	Appearance vacated by NCAA

Teams appearing in consecutive Final Fours
School	Number	Final Fours	Coach(es)
Arkansas	2	1994, 1995	Nolan Richardson
Butler	2	2010, 2011	Brad Stevens
California	2	1959, 1960	Pete Newell
Cincinnati	5	1959, 1960, 1961, 1962, 1963	George Smith (1959–60) & Ed Jucker (1961–63)
Duke	2	1963, 1964	Vic Bubas
Duke	5	1988, 1989, 1990, 1991, 1992	Mike Krzyzewski
Florida	2	2006, 2007	Billy Donovan
Georgetown	2	1984, 1985	John Thompson
Holy Cross	2	1947, 1948	Doggie Julian
Houston	2	1967, 1968	Guy Lewis
Houston	3	1982, 1983, 1984	Guy Lewis
Illinois	2	1951, 1952	Harry Combes
Iowa	2	1955, 1956	Bucky O'Connor
Kansas	2	1952, 1953	Phog Allen
Kansas	2	2002, 2003	Roy Williams
Kentucky	2	1948, 1949	Adolph Rupp
Kentucky	3	1996, 1997, 1998	Rick Pitino (1996–97) & Tubby Smith (1998)
Kentucky	2	2011, 2012	John Calipari
Kentucky	2	2014, 2015	John Calipari
La Salle	2	1954, 1955	Ken Loeffler
Louisville	2	1982, 1983	Denny Crum
Louisville	0 (2*)	2012*, 2013*	Rick Pitino
Maryland	2	2001, 2002	Gary Williams
Michigan	2	1964, 1965	Dave Strack
Michigan	0 (2*)	1992*, 1993*	Steve Fisher
Michigan State	3	1999, 2000, 2001	Tom Izzo
Michigan State	2	2009, 2010	Tom Izzo
North Carolina	3	1967, 1968, 1969	Dean Smith
North Carolina	2	1981, 1982	Dean Smith
North Carolina	2	1997, 1998	Dean Smith (1997) & Bill Guthridge (1998)
North Carolina	2	2008, 2009	Roy Williams
North Carolina	2	2016, 2017	Roy Williams
Ohio State	3	1944, 1945, 1946	Harold Olsen
Ohio State	3	1960, 1961, 1962	Fred Taylor
Oklahoma State	2	1945, 1946	Henry Iba
San Francisco	3	1955, 1956, 1957	Phil Woolpert
UCLA	2	1964, 1965	John Wooden
UCLA	10	1967, 1968, 1969, 1970, 1971, 1972, 1973, 1974, 1975, 1976	John Wooden (1967–75) & Gene Bartow (1976)
UCLA	3	2006, 2007, 2008	Ben Howland
UConn	2	2023, 2024	Dan Hurley
UNLV	2	1990, 1991	Jerry Tarkanian
Wisconsin	2	2014, 2015	Bo Ryan

== Final Four appearances by coach ==
Since 1939, 171 head coaches have appeared in the Final Four. Six of those coaches have had their only Final Four appearance vacated. Twenty-one coaches with a Final Four appearance are currently active.

Eighteen coaches have Final Four appearances with multiple schools. Of these, 16 have coached two schools and two coaches, John Calipari and Rick Pitino, have coached three schools. Pitino reached the Final Four with Providence, Kentucky, and Louisville. Calipari reached the Final Four with UMass, Memphis, and Kentucky, but his only appearances with UMass and Memphis were both vacated. Larry Brown appeared with UCLA and Kansas but his only appearance with UCLA was vacated. Three coaches are still active, with Kelvin Sampson active at a school he has already taken to the Final Four while Calipari and Pitino are active at schools they have not taken to the Final Four. Four coaches who have taken one school to the Final Four are currently coaching at a different school and have yet to take that school to the Final Four: Rick Barnes, Chris Beard, Porter Moser, and Shaka Smart.

Legend
Year	Won National Championship
Year	Lost National Championship Game
Year	Won National Third Place Game
*	Appearance vacated by NCAA
^{#}	Active head coach in NCAA Division I

Final Four appearances by coach
Head coach	Number of Schools	School	Appearances	Years
Phog Allen	1	Kansas	3	1940, 1952, 1953
Dana Altman^{#}	1	Oregon	1	2017
Forddy Anderson	2	Bradley	3	1950, 1954
Forddy Anderson	2	Michigan State	3	1957
Rick Barnes^{#}	1	Texas	1	2003
Sam Barry	1	USC	1	1940
Gene Bartow	2	Memphis	2	1973
Gene Bartow	2	UCLA	2	1976
Chris Beard^{#}	1	Texas Tech	1	2019
John Beilein	1	Michigan	2	2013, 2018
Dick Bennett	1	Wisconsin	1	2000
Tony Bennett	1	Virginia	1	2019
Jim Boeheim	1	Syracuse	5	1987, 1996, 2003, 2013, 2016
John Brady	1	LSU	1	2006
Dale Brown	1	LSU	2	1981, 1986
Earl Brown	1	Dartmouth	1	1944
Larry Brown	1 (2*)	UCLA	2 (3*)	1980*
Larry Brown	1 (2*)	Kansas	2 (3*)	1986, 1988
Vic Bubas	1	Duke	3	1963, 1964, 1966
Jim Calhoun	1	UConn	4	1999, 2004, 2009, 2011
John Calipari^{#}	1 (3*)	UMass	4 (6*)	1996*
John Calipari^{#}	1 (3*)	Memphis	4 (6*)	2008*
John Calipari^{#}	1 (3*)	Kentucky	4 (6*)	2011, 2012, 2014, 2015
Howard Cann	1	NYU	1	1945
P. J. Carlesimo	1	Seton Hall	1	1989
Doc Carlson	1	Pittsburgh	1	1941
Lou Carnesecca	1	St. John's	1	1985
Ben Carnevale	1	North Carolina	1	1946
Everett Case	1	NC State	1	1950
John Castellani	1	Seattle	1	1958
Harry Combes	1	Illinois	3	1949, 1951, 1952
Osborne Cowles	1	Dartmouth	1	1942
Frosty Cox	1	Colorado	1	1942
Tom Crean	1	Marquette	1	2003
Bobby Cremins	1	Georgia Tech	1	1990
Mick Cronin^{#}	1	UCLA	1	2021
Denny Crum	1	Louisville	6	1972, 1975, 1980, 1982, 1983, 1986
Roy Danforth	1	Syracuse	1	1975
Chick Davies	1	Duquesne	1	1940
Hubert Davis	1	North Carolina	1	2022
Mike Davis	1	Indiana	1	2002
Everett Dean	1	Stanford	1	1942
Don Donoher	1	Dayton	1	1967
Billy Donovan	1	Florida	4	2000, 2006, 2007, 2014
Bruce Drake	1	Oklahoma	2	1939, 1947
Scott Drew^{#}	1	Baylor	1	2021
Hugh Durham	2	Florida State	2	1972
Hugh Durham	2	Georgia	2	1983
Brian Dutcher^{#}	1	San Diego State	1	2023
Tippy Dye	1	Washington	1	1953
Bob Feerick	1	Santa Clara	1	1952
Mark Few^{#}	1	Gonzaga	2	2017, 2021
Steve Fisher	1	Michigan	1 (3*)	1989, 1992*, 1993*
Bill Foster	1	Duke	1	1978
Harold E. Foster	1	Wisconsin	1	1941
Jack Friel	1	Washington State	1	1941
Jack Gardner	2	Kansas State	4	1948, 1951
Jack Gardner	2	Utah	4	1961, 1966
Dave Gavitt	1	Providence	1	1973
Slats Gill	1	Oregon State	2	1949, 1963
Bully Gilstrap	1	Texas	1	1943
Todd Golden^{#}	1	Florida	1	2025
Jack Gray	1	Texas	1	1947
Elmer Gross	1	Penn State	1	1954
Bill Guthridge	1	North Carolina	2	1998, 2000
Joe B. Hall	1	Kentucky	3	1975, 1978, 1984
Dick Harp	1	Kansas	1	1957
Jim Harrick	1	UCLA	1	1995
Clem Haskins	0 (1*)	Minnesota	0 (1*)	1997*
Don Haskins	1	UTEP	1	1966
Doc Hayes	1	SMU	1	1956
Jud Heathcote	1	Michigan State	1	1979
Bill Henderson	1	Baylor	2	1948, 1950
Lou Henson	2	New Mexico State	2	1970
Lou Henson	2	Illinois	2	1989
Paul Hewitt	1	Georgia Tech	1	2004
Bernard Hickman	1	Louisville	1	1959
Howard Hobson	1	Oregon	1	1939
Bill Hodges	1	Indiana State	1	1979
Terry Holland	1	Virginia	2	1981, 1984
Nat Holman	1	CCNY	2	1947, 1950
Ben Howland	1	UCLA	3	2006, 2007, 2008
Bob Huggins	2	Cincinnati	2	1992
Bob Huggins	2	West Virginia	2	2010
Dan Hurley^{#}	1	UConn	3	2023, 2024, 2026
Henry Iba	1	Oklahoma State	4	1945, 1946, 1949, 1951
George Ireland	1	Loyola Chicago	1	1963
Tom Izzo^{#}	1	Michigan State	8	1999, 2000, 2001, 2005, 2009, 2010, 2015, 2019
Maury John	1	Drake	1	1969
Ed Jucker	1	Cincinnati	3	1961, 1962, 1963
Doggie Julian	1	Holy Cross	2	1947, 1948
Kevin Keatts	1	NC State	1	2024
George King	1	Purdue	1	1969
Dana Kirk	0 (1*)	Memphis	0 (1*)	1985*
Bob Knight	1	Indiana	5	1973, 1976, 1981, 1987, 1992
Jack Kraft	0 (1*)	Villanova	0 (1*)	1971*
Lon Kruger	2	Florida	2	1994
Lon Kruger	2	Oklahoma	2	2016
Mike Krzyzewski	1	Duke	13	1986, 1988, 1989, 1990, 1991, 1992, 1994, 1999, 2001, 2004, 2010, 2015, 2022
Eugene Lambert	1	Arkansas	1	1945
Jim Larrañaga	2	George Mason	2	2006
Jim Larrañaga	2	Miami (FL)	2	2023
Bebe Lee	1	Colorado	1	1955
Guy Lewis	1	Houston	5	1967, 1968, 1982, 1983, 1984
Harry Litwack	1	Temple	2	1956, 1958
Tommy Lloyd^{#}	1	Arizona	1	2026
Ken Loeffler	1	La Salle	2	1954, 1955
Rick Majerus	1	Utah	1	1998
Gregg Marshall	1	Wichita State	1	2013
Frank Martin	1	South Carolina	1	2017
Rollie Massimino	1	Villanova	1	1985
Thad Matta	1	Ohio State	2	2007, 2012
Dusty May	2	Florida Atlantic	2	2023
Dusty May	2	Michigan	2	2026
Branch McCracken	1	Indiana	2	1940, 1953
Al McGuire	1	Marquette	2	1974, 1977
Frank McGuire	2	St. John's	2	1952
Frank McGuire	2	North Carolina	2	1957
Bones McKinney	1	Wake Forest	1	1962
Louis Menze	1	Iowa State	1	1944
Ray Meyer	1	DePaul	2	1943, 1979
Mike Montgomery	1	Stanford	1	1998
Porter Moser^{#}	1	Loyola Chicago	1	2018
Pete Newell	1	California	2	1959, 1960
Jim O'Brien	0 (1*)	Ohio State	0 (1*)	1999*
Bucky O'Connor	1	Iowa	2	1955, 1956
Nate Oats^{#}	1	Alabama	1	2024
John Oldham	0 (1*)	Western Kentucky	0 (1*)	1971*
Kevin Ollie	1	UConn	1	2014
Harold Olsen	1	Ohio State	4	1939, 1944, 1945, 1946
Lute Olson	2	Iowa	5	1980
Lute Olson	2	Arizona	5	1988, 1994, 1997, 2001
Johnny Orr	1	Michigan	1	1976
Ted Owens	1	Kansas	2	1971, 1974
Matt Painter^{#}	1	Purdue	1	2024
Bruce Pearl	1	Auburn	2	2019, 2025
Vadal Peterson	1	Utah	1	1944
Digger Phelps	1	Notre Dame	1	1978
Rick Pitino^{#}	3	Providence	5 (7*)	1987
Rick Pitino^{#}	3	Kentucky	5 (7*)	1993, 1996, 1997
Rick Pitino^{#}	3	Louisville	5 (7*)	2005, 2012*, 2013*
Nibs Price	1	California	1	1946
Harry Rabenhorst	1	LSU	1	1953
Jack Ramsay	0 (1*)	Saint Joseph’s	0 (1*)	1961*
Nolan Richardson	1	Arkansas	3	1990, 1994, 1995
Elmer Ripley	1	Georgetown	1	1943
Glen Rose	1	Arkansas	1	1941
Lee Rose	2	Charlotte	2	1977
Lee Rose	2	Purdue	2	1980
Lou Rossini	1	NYU	1	1960
Adolph Rupp	1	Kentucky	6	1942, 1948, 1949, 1951, 1958, 1966
Bo Ryan	1	Wisconsin	2	2014, 2015
Kelvin Sampson^{#}	2	Oklahoma	3	2002
Kelvin Sampson^{#}	2	Houston	3	2021, 2025
Fred Schaus	1	West Virginia	1	1959
Jon Scheyer^{#}	1	Duke	1	2025
Bill Self^{#}	1	Kansas	3 (4*)	2008, 2012, 2018*, 2022
Alexander Severance	1	Villanova	1	1939
Everett Shelton	1	Wyoming	1	1943
Norm Sloan	1	NC State	1	1974
Shaka Smart^{#}	1	VCU	1	2011
Dean Smith	1	North Carolina	11	1967, 1968, 1969, 1972, 1977, 1981, 1982, 1991, 1993, 1995, 1997
George Smith	1	Cincinnati	2	1959, 1960
Tubby Smith	1	Kentucky	1	1998
Brad Stevens	1	Butler	2	2010, 2011
Dave Strack	1	Michigan	2	1964, 1965
Eddie Sutton	2	Arkansas	3	1978
Eddie Sutton	2	Oklahoma State	3	1995, 2004
Jerry Tarkanian	1	UNLV	4	1977, 1987, 1990, 1991
Fred Taylor	1	Ohio State	4	1960, 1961, 1962, 1968
Gary Thompson	1	Wichita State	1	1965
John Thompson	1	Georgetown	3	1982, 1984, 1985
John Thompson III	1	Georgetown	1	2007
Billy Tubbs	1	Oklahoma	1	1988
Forrest Twogood	1	USC	1	1954
Brad Underwood^{#}	1	Illinois	1	2026
Jim Valvano	1	NC State	1	1983
Butch van Breda Kolff	1	Princeton	1	1965
Bruce Weber	1	Illinois	1	2005
Bob Weinhauer	1	Penn	1	1979
Larry Weise	1	St. Bonaventure	1	1970
Gary Williams	1	Maryland	2	2001, 2002
Joe Williams	1	Jacksonville	1	1970
Richard Williams	1	Mississippi State	1	1996
Roy Williams	2	Kansas	9	1991, 1993, 2002, 2003
Roy Williams	2	North Carolina	9	2005, 2008, 2009, 2016, 2017
Tex Winter	1	Kansas State	2	1958, 1964
John Wooden	1	UCLA	12	1962, 1964, 1965, 1967, 1968, 1969, 1970, 1971, 1972, 1973, 1974, 1975
Phil Woolpert	1	San Francisco	3	1955, 1956, 1957
Jay Wright	1	Villanova	4	2009, 2016, 2018, 2022
Tom Young	1	Rutgers	1	1976

=== Coaches who also played in the Final Four ===
Eight head coaches have both played and coached in the Final Four. Dick Harp at Kansas, Hubert Davis at North Carolina and Jon Scheyer at Duke did so at the same school. Dean Smith and Bob Knight are the only two coaches to win a championship as player and coach, neither at the same school.

Coaches who played in the Final Four
Head coach	As player		As head coach	
Head coach	Team	Year(s)	Team	Year(s)
Vic Bubas	NC State	1950	Duke	1963, 1964, 1966
Hubert Davis	North Carolina	1991	North Carolina	2022
Billy Donovan	Providence	1987	Florida	2000, 2006, 2007, 2014
Dick Harp	Kansas	1940	Kansas	1957
Bob Knight	Ohio State	1960, 1961, 1962	Indiana	1973, 1976, 1981, 1987, 1992
Bones McKinney	North Carolina	1946	Wake Forest	1962
Jon Scheyer	Duke	2010	Duke	2025
Dean Smith	Kansas	1952	North Carolina	1967, 1968, 1969, 1972, 1977, 1981, 1982, 1991, 1993, 1995, 1997

== Final Four appearances by conference ==
Twenty-six conferences have appeared in the Final Four, of which 19 are still in existence. The following table shows Final Four appearance statistics based on teams' conference affiliations contemporaneous to their appearance. Schools who have had their only appearance vacated are denoted with an asterisk.

Final Four appearances by conference
Conference	Appearances			Number of Schools	Schools
Conference	Number	First	Last	Number of Schools	Schools
American (2013–present)	2	2014	2021	2	UConn, Houston
Atlantic 10 (1976–present)	0 (1*)	1996	1996	0 (1*)	UMass*
Atlantic Coast (1953–present)	51	1957	2025	9	Duke, Georgia Tech, Maryland, Miami (FL), NC State, North Carolina, Syracuse, Virginia, Wake Forest
Big 12 (1995–present)	13 (14*)	2002	2026	8	Arizona, Baylor, Houston, Kansas, Oklahoma, Oklahoma State, Texas, Texas Tech
Big East (1979–present) (Note: The official NCAA records book considers both iterations of the Big East the same conference despite the original Big East legally being succeeded by the American Athletic Conference in 2013 and the current Big East Conference being a completely new entity.)	24 (26*)	1982	2026	9	Georgetown, Louisville, Providence, Seton Hall, St. John's, Syracuse, UConn, Villanova, West Virginia
Big Eight (1928–1996)	20	1939	1995	6	Colorado, Iowa State, Kansas, Kansas State, Oklahoma, Oklahoma State
Big Ten (1905–present)	51 (55*)	1939	2026	8 (9*)	Illinois, Indiana, Iowa, Michigan, Michigan State, Minnesota*, Ohio State, Purdue, Wisconsin
Big West (1969–present)	3	1987	1991	1	UNLV
Colonial Athletic Association (1982–present)	2	2006	2011	2	George Mason, VCU
Conference USA (1995–present)	3 (4*)	2003	2023	4	Florida Atlantic, Louisville, Marquette, Memphis
East Coast (1958–1995)	0 (1*)	1961	1961	0 (1*)	Saint Joseph’s*
Great Midwest (1991–1995)	1	1992	1992	1	Cincinnati
Horizon League (1982–present)	2	2010	2011	1	Butler
Independent	39 (40*)	1939	1979	31	Bradley, CCNY, Dayton, DePaul, Duquesne, Florida State, Georgetown, Holy Cross, Houston, Jacksonville, La Salle, Louisville, Loyola Chicago, Marquette, New Mexico State, Notre Dame, NYU, Oregon State, Penn State, Pittsburgh, Providence, Rutgers, Santa Clara, Seattle, St. Bonaventure, St. John's, Syracuse, Temple, UNLV, UTEP, Villanova
Ivy League (1901–present)	4	1942	1979	3	Dartmouth, Penn, Princeton
Metro (1975–1995)	4 (5*)	1980	1986	2	Louisville, Memphis
Missouri Valley (1928–present)	18	1945	2018	9	Bradley, Cincinnati, Drake, Indiana State, Louisville, Loyola Chicago, Memphis, Oklahoma State, Wichita State
Mountain West (1999–present)	1	2023	2023	1	San Diego State
Ohio Valley (1948–present)	0 (1*)	1971	1971	1	Western Kentucky
Pac-12 (1915–present)	34 (35*)	1939	2021	9	Arizona, California, Oregon, Oregon State, Stanford, UCLA, USC, Washington, Washington State
Skyline Eight (1938–1962)	4	1942	1961	3	Colorado, Utah, Wyoming
Southeastern (1932–present)	35	1942	2025	9	Alabama, Arkansas, Auburn, Florida, Georgia, Kentucky, LSU, Mississippi State, South Carolina
Southern (1921–present)	3	1946	1959	3	NC State, North Carolina, West Virginia
Southwest (1914–1996)	12	1941	1990	5	Arkansas, Baylor, Houston, SMU, Texas
Sun Belt (1976–present)	1	1977	1977	0 (1*)	Charlotte*
West Coast (1952–present)	5	1955	2021	2	Gonzaga, San Francisco
Western Athletic (1962–present)	2	1966	1998	1	Utah

=== Final Fours with multiple schools from the same conference ===
There have been 27 Final Fours with multiple teams from the same conference. In two of these Final Fours, one of the conference team's appearance was later vacated later by the NCAA. The Big Ten has achieved this nine times, but two of those times one team's appearance was later vacated, tying them with the Atlantic Coast Conference for non-vacated multi-team Final Four appearances at seven. The Big East is the only conference to have three teams in the Final Four, which was in 1985.

Teams from the same conference have played against each other in nine National Semifinal games. Only three times have teams from the same conference played each other in the National Championship Game.

Legend
Year	One team won the National Championship
†	Teams met in the National Semifinals
‡	Teams met in the National Championship
*	One team's appearance vacated by NCAA

Conferences with multiple schools in the same Final Four
Conference	Number	Two teams	Three teams
Atlantic Coast	7	1981^{†}, 1990, 1991, 2001^{†}, 2004, 2016^{†}, 2022^{†}	
Big 12	2	2002, 2003	
Big East	4	1987^{†}, 2009, 2013*	1985^{†‡}
Big Eight	1	1988^{‡}	
Big Ten	7 (9*)	1976^{‡}, 1980, 1989^{†}, 1992*, 1999*, 2000^{†}, 2005, 2015, 2026	
Southeastern	5	1994, 1996, 2006, 2014, 2025^{†}	

== Final Four appearances by State ==
Schools from 39 States, along with the District of Columbia, have appeared in the Final Four. Of the 39 States, Minnesota, had its only appearance vacated.

Final Four appearances by State
State/District	Appearances			Number of Schools	Schools
State/District	Number	First	Last	Number of Schools	Schools
Alabama	3	2019	2025	2	Alabama, Auburn
Arizona	5	1988	2026	1	Arizona
Arkansas	6	1941	1995	1	Arkansas
California	30 (31*)	1940	2023	7	California, San Diego State, San Francisco, Santa Clara, Stanford, UCLA, USC
Colorado	2	1942	1955	1	Colorado
Connecticut	8	1999	2026	1	UConn
District of Columbia	5	1943	2007	1	Georgetown
Florida	10	1970	2025	5	Florida, Florida Atlantic, Florida State, Jacksonville, Miami
Georgia	3	1983	2004	2	Georgia, Georgia Tech
Illinois	12	1943	2026	4	Bradley, DePaul, Illinois, Loyola Chicago
Indiana	15	1940	2024	5	Butler, Indiana, Indiana State, Notre Dame, Purdue
Iowa	5	1944	1980	3	Drake, Iowa, Iowa State
Kansas	22	1940	2022	3	Kansas, Kansas State, Wichita State
Kentucky	25 (28*)	1942	2015	2 (3*)	Kentucky, Louisville, Western Kentucky*
Louisiana	4	1953	2006	1	LSU
Maryland	2	2001	2002	1	Maryland
Massachusetts	2 (3*)	1947	1996*	1 (2*)	Holy Cross, UMass*
Michigan	17 (19*)	1957	2026	2	Michigan, Michigan State
Minnesota	0 (1*)	1997*	1997*	0 (1*)	Minnesota*
Mississippi	1	1996	1996	1	Mississippi State
Nevada	4	1977	1991	1	UNLV
New Hampshire	2	1942	1944	1	Dartmouth
New Jersey	3	1965	1989	3	Princeton, Rutgers, Seton Hall
New Mexico	1	1970	1970	1	New Mexico State
New York	13	1945	2016	5	CCNY, NYU, St. Bonaventure, St. John's, Syracuse
North Carolina	45	1946	2025	5	Charlotte, Duke, NC State, North Carolina, Wake Forest
Ohio	17 (18*)	1939	2012	3	Cincinnati, Dayton, Ohio State
Oklahoma	11	1939	2016	2	Oklahoma, Oklahoma State
Oregon	4	1939	2017	2	Oregon, Oregon State
Pennsylvania	14 (16*)	1939	2022	7 (8*)	Duquesne, La Salle, Penn, Penn State, Pittsburgh, Saint Joseph's*, Temple, Villanova
Rhode Island	2	1973	1987	1	Providence
South Carolina	1	2017	2017	1	South Carolina
Tennessee	1 (3*)	1973	2008*	1	Memphis
Texas	16	1943	2025	6	Baylor, Houston, SMU, Texas, Texas Tech, UTEP
Utah	4	1944	1998	1	Utah
Virginia	5	1981	2019	3	George Mason, VCU, Virginia
Washington	5	1941	2021	4	Gonzaga, Seattle, Washington, Washington State
West Virginia	2	1959	2010	1	West Virginia
Wisconsin	7	1941	2015	2	Marquette, Wisconsin
Wyoming	1	1943	1943	1	Wyoming

=== Final Fours with multiple schools from the same State ===
Eleven Final Fours have featured two teams from the same State. North Carolina and Ohio both have three Final Fours with two teams, and Kentucky is the only other State to more than once. Teams from the same State have played each other four times in a National Semifinal and twice in the National Championship, both times Cincinnati and Ohio State in 1961 and 1962.

Legend
Team	Won National Championship
Team	Lost National Championship Game
Team	Won National Third Place Game
†	Teams met in the National Semifinal
‡	Teams met in the National Championship
*	Appearance vacated by NCAA

States with multiple teams in the same Final Four
State	Year	Teams	
Florida	2023	Florida Atlantic	Miami
Kentucky	1975	Kentucky	Louisville
Kentucky	2012	Kentucky^{†}	Louisville^{†}*
North Carolina	1977	UNC Charlotte	North Carolina
North Carolina	1991	Duke	North Carolina
North Carolina	2022	Duke^{†}	North Carolina^{†}
Ohio	1960	Cincinnati	Ohio State
Ohio	1961	Cincinnati^{‡}	Ohio State^{‡}
Ohio	1962	Cincinnati^{‡}	Ohio State^{‡}
Pennsylvania	1954	La Salle^{†}	Penn State^{†}
Texas	2021	Baylor^{†}	Houston^{†}

== Vacated appearances ==
Fourteen Final Four appearances have been vacated by eleven schools. Two of these schools won the Third Place Game and five schools were the National Runner-Up, with Michigan vacating two runner-up finishes. Only one school, Louisville, has had a national championship vacated.

- Saint Joseph's vacated its 1961 semifinal loss and third-place game victory because three players were involved in a point-shaving scandal.
- Villanova vacated its 1971 championship game loss because Howard Porter had signed a professional contract with the Pittsburgh Condors of the American Basketball Association (ABA) during the regular season. The Most Outstanding Player award was also vacated, as it had been awarded to Porter despite his team losing the championship game.
- Western Kentucky vacated its 1971 semifinal loss and third-place game victory because Jim McDaniels had signed a professional contract with the Carolina Cougars of the American Basketball Association and accepted money during the regular season.
- UCLA vacated its 1980 championship game loss because Kiki Vandeweghe and Rod Foster were declared ineligible for their connection with recruiting violations involving booster Sam Gilbert.
- Memphis vacated its 1985 semifinal loss because Keith Lee had received $40,000 in illegal payoffs from head coach Dana Kirk. Memphis would also vacated its 2008 championship game loss because Derrick Rose's SAT score was invalidated after the season.
- Michigan vacated its 1992 and 1993 championship game losses because Chris Webber, Maurice Taylor, Robert Traylor, and Louis Bullock were found ineligible.
- UMass vacated its 1996 semifinal loss because Marcus Camby had accepted money and gifts from a pair of sports agents.
- Minnesota vacated its 1997 semifinal loss because involving head coach Clem Haskins, five other university employees, and at least eighteen players had committed academic fraud.
- Ohio State vacated its 1999 semifinal loss because Boban Savović was declared ineligible.
- Louisville vacated its 2012 semifinal loss and their 2013 national championship because several unnamed players were declared ineligible as a result of a sex scandal. The Most Outstanding Player award, awarded to Luke Hancock, was vacated as part of the disciplinary action. Hancock and four other players sued the NCAA and alleged they had been cast in a "false light" in relation to the scandal. The NCAA agreed to restore their awards and statistics as part of a settlement, including Hancock's MOP award.
- Kansas vacated its 2018 semifinal loss for recruiting violations.
