= Wat Misaka =

American basketball player (1923–2019)

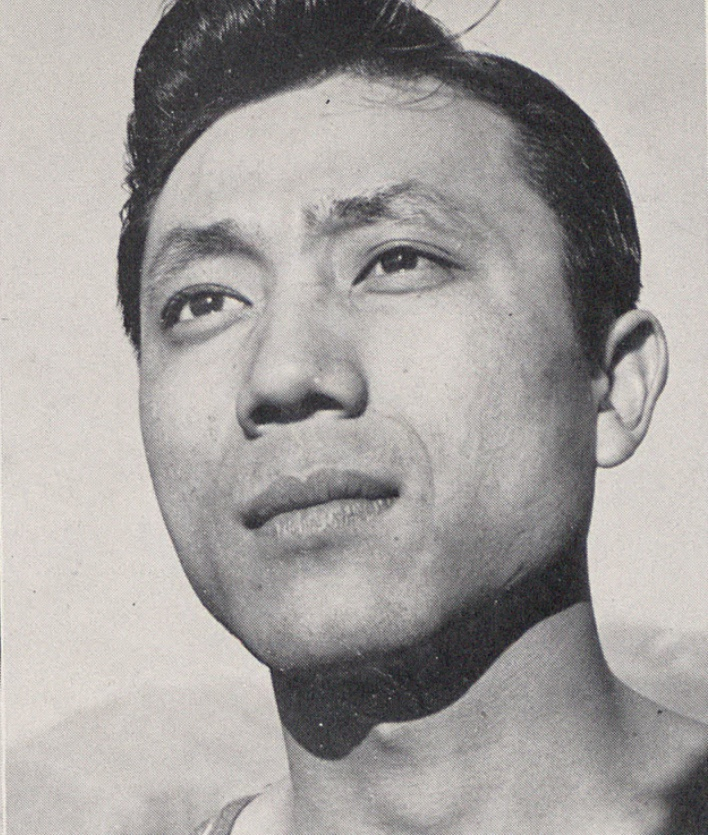
- Misaka in college with Utah in 1946–47

Personal information
- Born: December 21, 1923 Ogden, Utah, U.S.
- Died: November 20, 2019 (aged 95) Salt Lake City, Utah, U.S.
- Listed height: 5 ft 7 in (1.70 m)
- Listed weight: 150 lb (68 kg)

Career information
- High school: Ogden (Ogden, Utah)
- College: Weber State (1941–1943); Utah (1943–1944, 1946–1947)
- NBA draft: 1947: 7th round, 61st overall pick
- Drafted by: New York Knicks
- Position: Point guard
- Number: 15

Career history
- 1947: New York Knicks

Career highlights
- NCAA champion (1944); No. 20 honored by Utah Utes
- Stats at NBA.com
- Stats at Basketball Reference

Other information

Japanese name
- Kanji: 三阪 亙
Transcriptions
- Romanization: Misaka Wataru

Wataru Misaka (December 21, 1923 – November 20, 2019) was an American professional basketball player. A 5-foot-7-inch (1.70 m) point guard of Japanese descent, he broke a color barrier in professional basketball by being the first non-white player and the first player of Asian descent to play in the Basketball Association of America (BAA). The National Basketball Association (NBA), which was created in 1949 with the merger of the BAA and the NBL, later adopted the BAA's history and thus considers Misaka to be the first non-white player of the league.

Misaka played college basketball for the Utah Utes and helped lead the team to championships in the 1944 NCAA tournament and 1947 National Invitation Tournament (NIT). He took a two-year hiatus between these titles to serve in the United States Army in the American occupation of Japan. Misaka subsequently played three games for the New York Knicks during the 1947–48 season.

== Early life ==
Misaka was born a Nisei (second-generation Japanese-American) in Ogden, Utah, to Tatsuyo and Fusaichi Misaka. He grew up poor with his two younger brothers. His family lived in the basement of his father's barber shop between a bar and a pawn shop in a bad area on 25th Street, which was also rife with prostitution. He recalled the neighborhood as being a "ghetto". Despite all the hardship, Misaka's parents tried their best to provide Wat with a proper American education.

Misaka was raised in an era of "virtual apartheid", wrote University of Utah magazine Continuum. Excluded from extracurricular activities, Nisei children played in their own baseball and basketball leagues. Misaka was not served in restaurants because of his ethnicity, and neighbors would cross the street to steer clear of him. When his mother tried to encourage the family to move back to Hiroshima, Misaka declined and decided to stay in Utah in spite of all the discrimination. Although his family was outside of the relocation zone, Misaka felt guilty, as his friends were forced to be within the restraints of the camps while he had the opportunity to study and pursue his basketball dream.

Despite this, Misaka still participated in sports. Misaka attended Ogden High School, where he led the basketball team to a state championship title in 1940 and a regional championship title in 1941.

== College career ==
After high school, Misaka continued his education at the same time that many other Japanese-Americans were forced into internment camps. He attended Weber College, where he helped lead its basketball team to two championships. Misaka was named the Most Valuable Player of the 1942 junior college postseason tournament and, in 1943, he was named the Weber College athlete of the year.

Misaka subsequently enrolled at the University of Utah and joined their Utes basketball team. The young team finished with an 18–3 record in the 1943–44 season. They were invited to both the NCAA tournament and the National Invitation Tournament (NIT). The team chose the latter because it was more prestigious at the time, and meant a trip to New York City. (Note: New York City was a venue for both the NCAA tournament and NIT in 1944, but because of the regional nature of the NCAA event, only the four teams in the East Regional were guaranteed games in New York, specifically at the third Madison Square Garden. The West Regional was held in Kansas City, Missouri, with the winner advancing to the championship game at the Garden. In that era, all NIT games were played in the Garden. (The modern Garden is the fourth venue of that name.)) The team lost to Kentucky in the first round, but was given a chance to play in the NCAA tournament due to Arkansas' withdrawal because of a team accident. The team took advantage of this and won the tournament, winning the championship game over Dartmouth 42–40 in overtime. Two nights later, Misaka and his team played the NIT champions, St. John's, in an exhibition match at Madison Square Garden, where his team won 43–36. Misaka was later drafted for World War II and rose to the rank of staff sergeant. After two years, he returned to the University of Utah and rejoined the team. While his teammates were guaranteed spots back on the team upon their return from deployments, he was required to try out again to be on the team. The team was in position to win their second national tournament in four years after being invited to the eight-team National Invitational Tournament in New York. Utah's narrow victories in the first two rounds put them in the finals where they defeated Kentucky 49–45 to capture the 1947 NIT championship title. Misaka held Wildcats All-American guard Ralph Beard to a single point.

During his first few seasons with the Utes, Misaka was often met with boos whenever he was on the floor. Japan was at war against the United States, and Misaka became a target. Fortunately, his teammates had his back and were able to form a formidable bond. After the end of the war and as the team found more success on the court, however, Misaka was often the center of the fans' attention, with his unique background in contrast to the other players on the floor. The Utah team was later nicknamed "the Cinderella team" with their winning ways, despite often being the underdogs on paper. On January 22, 2022, Misaka's number 20 jersey was honored by the Utah Utes for his contributions towards a national championship alongside his courage battling against the discrimination he faced.

== Professional career ==
Misaka was selected by the New York Knicks in the 1947 BAA draft. He debuted as the first non-Caucasian player in the BAA (later known as the NBA) in 1947, the same year that Jackie Robinson broke the baseball color line. The first African-American did not play in the NBA until 1950. There were no press conferences or interviews to commemorate Misaka's first game. "It wasn't a big thing," he said. "Nobody cared."

Misaka played in three games and scored seven points in the 1947–48 season before being cut from the team mid-season. He believed he was cut because the Knicks had too many guards. Misaka said he did not feel any discrimination from teammates or opposing players during his time with the Knicks, but he did not mingle with everyone. During training camp, he was only close with future Hall-of-Famer Carl Braun.

== Later years ==
Misaka declined an offer to play with the Harlem Globetrotters, and he returned home to earn a degree in mechanical engineering from Utah in 1948. "The salary for a rookie and the salary for starting engineer weren't much different", he recalled. Misaka then joined a company in Salt Lake City as an electrical engineer. He pursued bowling after his basketball career ended, notably hitting a near-perfect 299 game at the age of 80.

Misaka and his wife, Katie, had two children. He died at the age of 95 on November 20, 2019, in Salt Lake City.

== Legacy ==
Misaka won the NCAA tournament during a time of strong anti-Japanese sentiment. Within the internment camps, Misaka became a cultural symbol and his on-court success provided a huge boost to the Japanese-American community. The local community in Utah also celebrated the victory, with a crowd of 15,000–20,000 gathering together at the celebration parade in March 1947. Some argued that the Utes' victory was the greatest athletic achievement in the state up to that point.

In a period marked with turmoil and tension, Misaka's story is one that exemplifies great courage and determination. Misaka was relentless in his pursuit of team success and helped the Utah Utes become one of the great Cinderella teams in college basketball history. Although he only played three games in the NBA, he showed others what was possible and that true talent transcends race. Following Misaka, there were other Asian players who broke barriers and joined the NBA. A well-known player who also happened to have played for the New York Knicks was Jeremy Lin. In 2012, Misaka attended a Knicks game as a fan and reflected on Lin's rise to stardom. In an interview, Misaka downplayed his own success, believing that his NBA career didn't warrant the same attention as Lin's.

Misaka was inducted into the Utah Sports Hall of Fame in 1999. In 2000, Misaka was featured in a landmark exhibit, More Than a Game: Sport in the Japanese American Community, at the Japanese American National Museum in Los Angeles. A documentary film, Transcending: The Wat Misaka Story by Bruce Alan Johnson and Christine Toy Johnson, premiered in 2008. It recounts Misaka's playing career and his status as the first non-white player in the NBA. In 2025, the Salt Lake City-based Plan-B Theatre Company staged the one-man show Kilo-Wat, about Misaka's playing career and time in the military, on-campus at the University of Utah's Kingsbury Hall.

In 1997 Misaka was inducted into the Japanese American National Bowling Hall of Fame.

== BAA career statistics ==
Legend
GP	Games played
FG%	Field-goal percentage
FT%	Free-throw percentage
APG	Assists per game
PPG	Points per game

=== Regular season ===
Year	Team	GP	FG%	FT%	APG	PPG
1947–48	New York	3	.231	.333	.0	2.3
Career		3	.231	.333	.0	2.3

== See also ==
- List of shortest players in National Basketball Association history
- Race and ethnicity in the NBA
- Racial triangulation theory
