= 1943–44 Michigan Wolverines men's basketball team =

American college basketball season

1943–44 Michigan Wolverines men's basketball
- Conference: Big Ten Conference
- Record: 8–10 (5–7 Big Ten)
- Head coach: Bennie Oosterbaan
- Assistant coach: William C. Barclay
- MVP: Thomas King
- Captains: Ralph Gilbert; Dave Strack (acting)
- Home arena: Yost Field House

1943–44 Big Ten Conference men's basketball standings
	Conf.				Overall
Team	W		L	PCT	W		L	PCT
Ohio State	10	–	2	.833	14	–	7	.667
Iowa	9	–	3	.750	14	–	4	.778
Wisconsin	9	–	3	.750	12	–	9	.571
Northwestern	8	–	4	.667	12	–	7	.632
Purdue	8	–	4	.667	11	–	10	.524
Illinois	5	–	7	.417	11	–	9	.550
Michigan	5	–	7	.417	8	–	10	.444
Minnesota	2	–	10	.167	7	–	14	.333
Indiana	2	–	10	.167	7	–	15	.318
Chicago	0	–	8	.000	1	–	19	.050

The 1943–44 Michigan Wolverines men's basketball team represented the University of Michigan in intercollegiate basketball during the 1943–44 season. In their sixth year under head coach Bennie Oosterbaan, the Wolverines finished the season in a tie for sixth place in the Big Ten Conference with an overall record of 12–7 and 5–7 against conference opponents.

After team captain Ralph Gilbert was inducted into the military, junior guard/forward Dave Strack from Indianapolis was the team's acting captain and led the team in scoring with 194 points. Sophomore forward Thomas "Little Tommy" King scored 172 points and was selected as the team's Most Valuable Player. Center Elroy "Crazy Legs" Hirsch was the team's third highest scorer and became the first University of Michigan athlete to receive varsity letters in four sports (football, basketball, track and field, and baseball) during the same academic year.

== Season overview ==
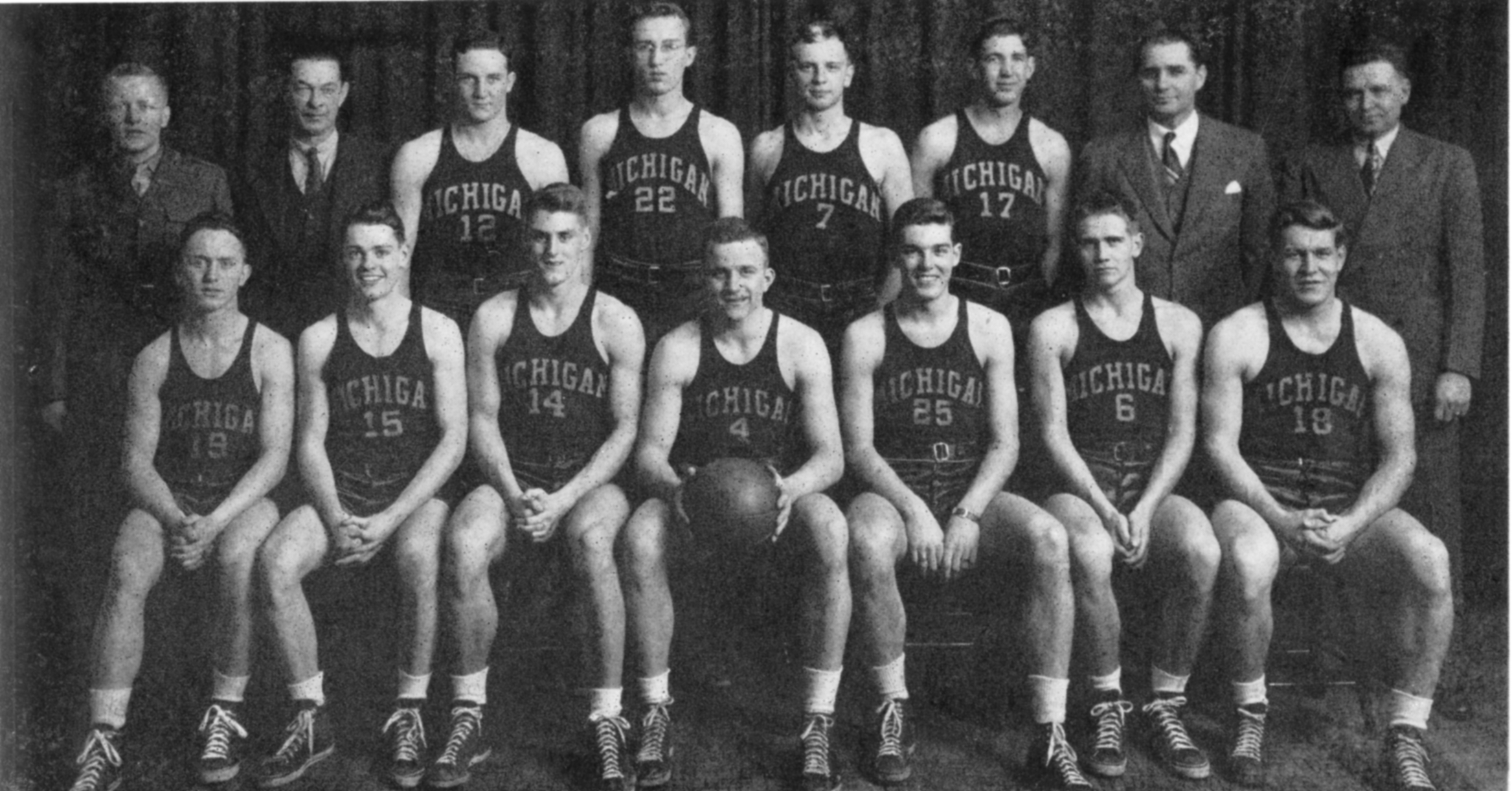
1943–44 team portrait Back row (l to r): mngr. Hugh Miller, Rex Wells, Rill Seymour, Wayne Thompson, Bob Wiese, head coach Bennie Oosterbaan, asst. coach William C. Barclay Front Row: Charles Kelterer, Thomas King, Elroy Hirsch, Dave Strack, John Leddy, Richard Shrider, Don Lund

In March 1943, at the conclusion of the 1942–43 season, Ralph Gilbert of Flint, Michigan was elected to serve as the captain of the 1943–44 team. However, he was inducted into the military and did not play. Junior forward Dave Strack from Indianapolis served as "acting captain" in place of Gilbert.

The 1943–44 team finished the season in a tie for sixth place in the Big Ten Conference with an overall record of 12–7 and 5–7 against conference opponents. Bennie Oosterbaan was in his sixth year as the team's head coach.

Dave Strack was the team's leading scorer with 194 points in 16 games for an average of 12.1 points per game. Strack later served as the head coach of the Michigan basketball team from 1960 to 1968, including three consecutive Big Ten championships from 1963 to 1966.

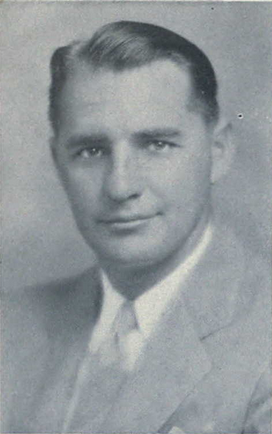
Head coach Bennie Oosterbaan later coached the football team from 1947 to 1957.

Sophomore forward Thomas King, known as "Little Tommy" and sometimes "Tiny Tom," was selected as the team's Most Valuable Player. King was the team's second leading scorer with 172 points and the team leader in scoring against Big Ten opponents. King was a United States Marine Corps trainee who transferred from Michigan State College after his freshman year.

At the end of the 1943–44, and based on a vote of Big Ten coaches and Midwestern sportswriters, the United Press named four Wolverines as honorable mention players on the All-Big Ten basketball team. Elroy Hirsch was named at the center position while Thomas King was named at forward, and Dave Strack and John Leddy were named at guard.

The 1943–44 team also included three athletes, Don Lund, Bob Wiese and Elroy "Crazy Legs" Hirsch, who went on to play professionally in sports other than basketball. Lund played football, baseball, and basketball at Michigan, received a total of nine varsity letters, and later played Major League Baseball from 1945 to 1954. Wiese played for the Detroit Lions from 1947 to 1948. Hirsch was the first University of Michigan athlete to receive varsity letters in four sports in the same academic year. Hirsch lettered in football, basketball, track and field (as a broad jumper), and baseball during the 1943–44 academic year. Hirsh went on to play 12 seasons in the All-America Football Conference and the National Football League. Five participant on the 1943–44 Michigan basketball team were inducted into the University of Michigan Athletic Hall of Honor. Head coach Bennie Oosterbaan, who was a multi-sport star at Michigan in the 1920s and head football coach from 1948 to 1958, was one of the inaugural inductees in 1978. Elroy Hirsch, Don Lund, Dave Strack was inducted in 1984. Bruce Hilkene, who was the captain of the undefeated 1947 Michigan Wolverines football team, was inducted in 1992.

== Statistical leaders ==
Eleven players were awarded varsity letters for their participation on the 1943–44 basketball team. They are indicated in bold in the list below. Six other players received "secondary" awards: Bruce Hilkene, William Oren, Albin Pertile, Walter Rankin, Robert Stevens, and Robb H. Rutledge. Senior Hugh Miller received the Manager's Award as the team's student manager.

**Player**	**Pos.**	**Yr**	**G**	**FG**	**FT**	**RB**	**Pts**	**PPG**
**Dave Strack**	G/F	Jr.	16	90	14	na	194	12.1
**Thomas King**	F	Soph.	15	70	32	na	172	11.5
**Elroy Hirsch**	C		13	35	25	na	95	7.3
**Don Lund**		Jr.	18	31	18	na	80	4.4
**William Seymour**		Jr.	15	25	10	na	60	4.0
**John Leddy**	G		12	24	6	na	54	4.5
**Richard Shrider**			14	17	10	na	44	3.1
**Wayne Thompson**			11	14	9	na	37	3.4
**Charles Ketterer**		Jr.	9	9	4	na	22	2.4
William Oren			4	8	4	na	20	5.0
**Bob Wiese**			7	5	5	na	15	2.1
**Rex Wells**			6	5	1	na	11	1.8
Howard Wikel			2	3	4	na	10	5.0
Bruce Hilkene			4	2	0	na	4	1.0
Bob Stevens			2	1	1	na	3	1.5
Albin Pertile			1	1	0	na	2	2.0
Cook			2	0	0	na	0	0.0
Walter Rankin			1	0	0	na	0	0.0
**Totals**			18	340	143	na	823	45.7

== Game summaries ==
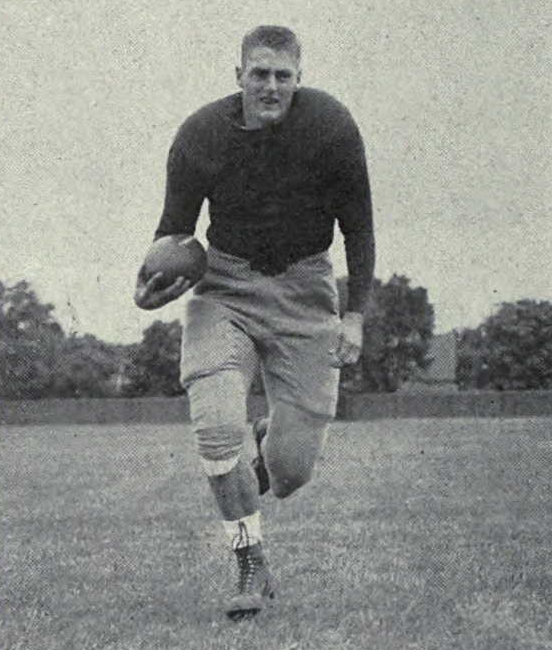
Elroy Hirsch played for the Los Angeles Rams 1949–57.

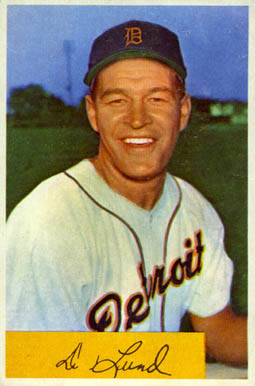
Don Lund played for the Dodgers and Tigers 1945–54.

=== Central Michigan: Dec. 4, 1943 ===
On Saturday, December 4, 1943, Michigan opened its basketball season with a 51–28 victory over Central Michigan at Yost Field House. The game drew a crowd of 1,500 persons. The Wolverines jumped to a 23–10 lead at halftime and expanded its lead to 23 points by the end of the game. Dave Strack was the leading scorer for Michigan with 13 points, and Bill Oren scored 10 points. Dick Shrider, a transfer student from Ohio State, also had four field goals.

=== At Romulus Air Base: Dec. 6, 1943 ===
On Monday, December 6, 1943, the Wolverines defeated the team from the Army Air Corps team from the Romulus Air Base by a 42–30 score in a game played at Romulus, Michigan. Due to wartime restrictions, Michigan was not permitted to play any of its military trainees in the weekday game off campus and was forced to play an all civilian lineup. Romulus led at halftime 16-13. The Wolverines rallied for 26 points in the second half. Don "Whitey" Lund was the high scorer for Michigan with 11 points on five field goals and one free throw. Howard Wikel and William Seymour added 10 points each.

=== Fort Custer: Dec. 11, 1943 ===
On Saturday, December 11, 1943, Michigan defeated the United States Army team from Fort Custer by 46–44 score in a night game at Yost Field House. The Wolverines led 22–19 at halftime. Dave Strack was the leading scorer for Michigan with 19 points on nine field goals and one-of-two free throws. Guard Richard Shrider was the second highest scorer with eight points on three field goals and two-of-three free throws.

=== Western Michigan: Dec. 18, 1943 ===
On Saturday, December 18, 1943, Michigan lost to Western Michigan by a 48–38 score at Yost Field House. Western Michigan led 20–17 at halftime. The victory was Western Michigan's fifth in a row in a streak that included wins against Notre Dame and Northwestern.

=== At Western Michigan: Jan 1, 1944 ===
On Saturday, January 1, 1944, the Wolverines lost their second consecutive game to Western Michigan by a 57–50 score at Kalamazoo. The victory was Western Michigan's sixth in a row. The game was tied 48–48 at the end of regulation, but the Wolverines scored only two points in the overtime period on a field goal by Dick Shrider. Bill Morton scored six points for Western Michigan in the overtime period. Dave Strack led Michigan with 14 points, and Thomas King added 13. Elroy Hirsch played at center, in his first basketball game for Michigan. He had not played in a basketball game since high school. After the game, The Michigan Alumnus reported on Hirsch: "His fighting spirit and his drive, plus his ability to grab the ball off the backboard, stamp him as the man who may play center for Coach Oosterbaan during the regular season."

=== Northwestern: Jan. 7, 1944 ===
On Friday, January 7, 1944, Michigan lost to Northwestern by a 57–47 score at Yost Field House. Thomas King, a Marine Corps transfer from Michigan State, was the leading scorer in the game with 24 points. Elroy Hirsch was assigned to cover Northwestern star Otto Graham and held Graham to four field goals.

=== Illinois: Jan. 8, 1944 ===
On Saturday, January 8, 1944, Michigan defeated Illinois by a 52–45 score at Yost Field House. Thomas King was the leading scorer for Michigan with 16 points. In a weekend during which University of Michigan athletes also won a swim meet, and track and field meet, and a wrestling meet, an Associated Press account noted: "Tommy King, Jr., the bantam Marine cager from East Lansing, today emerged as the No. 1 hero of a highly-successful week-end on the Michigan indoor sports front."

=== At Wisconsin: Jan. 14-15, 1944 ===
On Friday, January 14, 1944, Michigan lost to the Wisconsin Badgers by a 50–41 score at Camp Randall Fieldhouse in Madison, Wisconsin. Wisconsin led 25–20 at halftime, and Michigan trailed by only one point, 40–39, with less than five minutes remaining in the game. Tom King was Michigan's leading scorer with 13 points on four field goals and five free throws. Elroy Hirsch scored 11 points, all in the second half on four field goals and three free throws.

On Saturday, January 15, 1944, the Wolverines lost their second straight game to the Badgers by a 42–31 score at Camp Randall Fieldhouse.

=== At Fort Custer: Jan. 18, 1944 ===
On Tuesday, January 18, 1944, Michigan lost an away game against Fort Custer by a 35–32 score. The Wolverines played the game without four of their regular players, as Don Lund was the only starter who played in the game. The four other Michigan starters were either Navy or Marine Corps trainees who were not permitted to participate in mid-week games off campus.

=== At Purdue: Jan. 21-22, 1944 ===
On Friday, January 21, 1944, the Wolverines lost to the Purdue Boilermakers by a 46–44 score. The Wolverines led the game 23-–and were ahead 42–40 with 10 seconds left in the game. The Boilermakers scored, and the game went to overtime. Dave Strack was the high scorer for Michigan with 19 points.

On Saturday, January 22, 1944, the Wolverines lost the second game of their weekend series at Purdue by a 51–35 score. The Saturday game drew a crowd of 7,000. The Boilermakers led 18–16 at halftime and outscored the Wolverines 33–19 in the second half. Dave Strack was Michigan's high scorer for the second consecutive night with 14 points on seven field goals and 0-for-1 free throws. Thomas King scored eight points on four field goals and 0-for-4 free throws. Guard John Leddy scored six points on three field goals.

=== Ohio State: Jan. 28-29, 1944 ===
On Friday, January 28, 1944, Michigan lost to Ohio State by a 53–49 score at Yost Field House. Ohio State led 23–22 at halftime and the game remained close throughout. Thomas King scored 27 points in the game on 11 field goals and five free throws. With his performance against the Buckeyes, King became the leading scorer in the Big Ten up to that point in the season. Elroy Hirsch was the second leading scorer for Michigan with seven points while Dave Strack scored six.

On Saturday, January 29, 1944, Michigan lost the second game of its weekend series against Ohio State by a 52–39 score. Ohio State led 25–22 at halftime but outscored Michigan 27–17 in the second half. Thomas King led the Wolverines with 12 points on six field goals and remained the leading scorer in the Big Ten Conference through that date. Elroy Hirsch was the second highest scorer for Michigan with nine points (three field goals, three free throws) while Dave Strack added eight points (three field goals).

=== Indiana: Feb. 4-5, 1944 ===
On February 4, 1944, Michigan defeated Indiana by a 65–49 score at Yost Field House. Elroy Hirsch led Michigan with 22 points. Thomas King scored 16 points and remained the leading scorer in the Big Ten with 125 points.

On February 5, 1944, Michigan defeated Indiana by as 46–44 at Yost Field House. After defeating the Hoosiers by 16 points on Friday night, the Wolverines found themselves in a close game on Saturday. Michigan trailed by six points with five minutes remaining, but rallied in the final minutes. Free throws by Dave Strack and John Leddy put Michigan ahead in the final minute. Dave Strack was the high scorer for Michigan with 18 points, and Tom King scored 12.

=== At Chicago: Feb. 12, 1944 ===
On Saturday, February 12, 1944, Michigan defeated the University of Chicago by a 74–41 score in Chicago. Thomas King was held to six points and dropped from the top spot among Big Ten Conference scorers with 143 points. The loss was the 46th consecutive loss for the University of Chicago against a Big Ten opponent.

=== At Northwestern: Feb. 19, 1944 ===
On Saturday, February 19, 1944, the Wolverines concluded the 1943–44 season with a victory over Northwestern by a 50–45 score at Evanston, Illinois. Thomas King scored 14 points in the game. Northwestern was tied for first place in the Big Ten before the game and dropped to fourth place after the defeat. Ohio State won the Big Ten championship, and Thomas King finished fifth in the Big Ten individual scoring race with 157 points (65 field goals, 27 free throws) in 12 conference games. Dave Strack finished in seventh place with 135 points (63 field goals, 9 free throws) in 12 conference games.
