= 1943–44 Wisconsin Badgers men's basketball team =

American college basketball season

1943–44 Wisconsin Badgers men's basketball
- Conference: Big Ten Conference
- Record: 12–9 (9–3 Big Ten)
- Head coach: Harold E. Foster
- Home arena: UW Fieldhouse

1943–44 Big Ten Conference men's basketball standings
| | Conf. | | | | Overall |
| Team | W | | L | PCT | W | | L | PCT |
|---|---|---|---|---|---|---|---|---|
| Ohio State | 10 | – | 2 | .833 | 14 | – | 7 | .667 |
| Iowa | 9 | – | 3 | .750 | 14 | – | 4 | .778 |
| Wisconsin | 9 | – | 3 | .750 | 12 | – | 9 | .571 |
| Northwestern | 8 | – | 4 | .667 | 12 | – | 7 | .632 |
| Purdue | 8 | – | 4 | .667 | 11 | – | 10 | .524 |
| Illinois | 5 | – | 7 | .417 | 11 | – | 9 | .550 |
| Michigan | 5 | – | 7 | .417 | 8 | – | 10 | .444 |
| Minnesota | 2 | – | 10 | .167 | 7 | – | 14 | .333 |
| Indiana | 2 | – | 10 | .167 | 7 | – | 15 | .318 |
| Chicago | 0 | – | 8 | .000 | 1 | – | 19 | .050 |

The 1943–44 Wisconsin Badgers men's basketball team represented University of Wisconsin–Madison. The head coach was Harold E. Foster, coaching his tenth season with the Badgers. The team played their home games at the UW Fieldhouse in Madison, Wisconsin and was a member of the Big Ten Conference.

== Schedule ==
| Date time, TV | Rank^{#} | Opponent^{#} | Result | Record | Site city, state |
Regular Season
| 11/29/1943* | | DePauw Pre-Flight | W 28–25 | 1–0 | UW Fieldhouse; Madison, WI |
| 12/04/1943* | | Marquette | L 43–51 | 1–1 | UW Fieldhouse; Madison, WI |
| 12/11/1943* | | at Notre Dame | L 31–41 | 1–2 | Notre Dame Fieldhouse; Notre Dame, IN |
| 12/13/1943* | | Camp Grant (IL) | L 40–51 | 1–3 | UW Fieldhouse; Madison, WI |
| 12/18/1943* | | at Marquette | W 40–37 | 2–3 | Marquette Gymnasium; Milwaukee, WI |
| 12/31/1943* | | vs. Notre Dame | W 47–45 | 3–3 | Marquette Gymnasium; Milwaukee, WI |
| 1/03/1944 | | Illinois | L 43–45 ^{OT} | 3–4 (0–1) | UW Fieldhouse; Madison, WI |
| 1/07/1944 | | at Illinois | W 43–38 | 4–4 (1–1) | Huff Hall; Champaign, IL |
| 1/08/1944 | | vs. Northwestern | L 38–60 | 4–5 (1–2) | Chicago Stadium; Chicago, IL |
| 1/14/1944 | | Michigan | W 50–41 | 5–5 (2–2) | UW Fieldhouse; Madison, WI |
| 1/15/1944 | | Michigan | W 42–31 | 6–5 (3–2) | UW Fieldhouse; Madison, WI |
| 1/29/1944 | | at Minnesota | W 49–30 | 7–5 (4–2) | Minnesota Field House; Minneapolis, MN |
| 2/04/1944 | | Northwestern | W 50–47 ^{2OT} | 8–5 (5–2) | UW Fieldhouse; Madison, WI |
| 2/07/1944* | | Great Lakes (IL) | L 40–63 | 8–6 | UW Fieldhouse; Madison, WI |
| 2/11/1944 | | at Indiana | W 62–43 | 9–6 (6–2) | IU Fieldhouse; Bloomington, IN |
| 2/12/1944 | | at Indiana | W 52–31 | 10–6 (7–2) | IU Fieldhouse; Bloomington, IN |
| 2/19/1944 | | Purdue | L 50–52 ^{OT} | 10–7 (7–3) | UW Fieldhouse; Madison, WI |
| 2/25/1944 | | Minnesota | W 50–33 | 11–7 (8–3) | UW Fieldhouse; Madison, WI |
| 3/03/1944* | | vs. DePaul | L 35–48 | 11–8 | Chicago Stadium; Chicago, IL |
| 3/04/1944 | | at Chicago | W 74–46 | 12–8 (9–3) | Henry Crown Field House; Chicago, IL |
| 3/05/1944* | | at Great Lakes (IL) | L 47–63 | 12–9 | Waukegan, IL |
*Non-conference game. ^{#}Rankings from AP Poll. (#) Tournament seedings in parentheses.
