= Harold Olsen =

American basketball player and coach

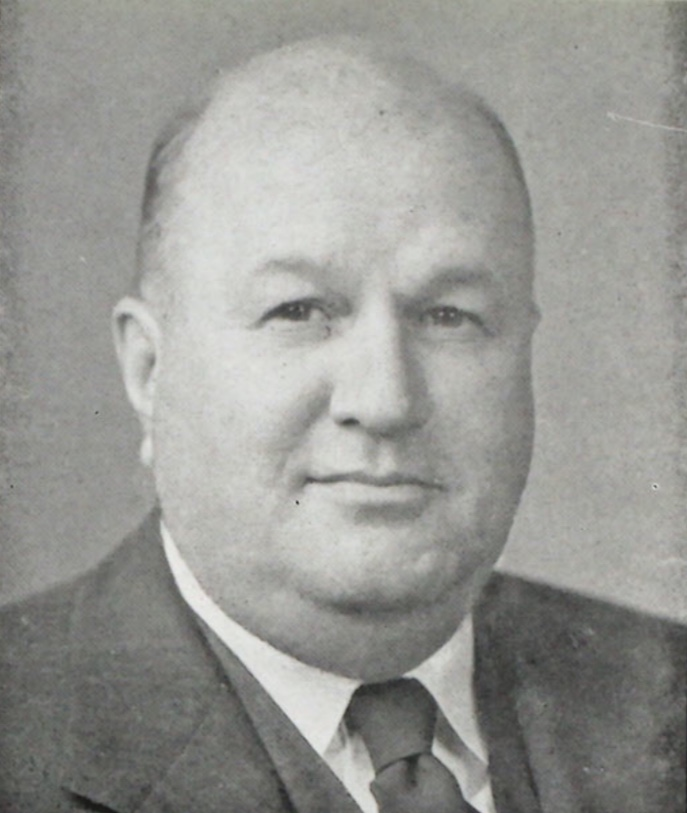
- Olsen from the 1946 Makio

Biographical details
- Born: May 12, 1895; Rice Lake, Wisconsin, U.S.
- Died: October 29, 1953 (aged 58); Rice Lake, Wisconsin, U.S.

Playing career

Basketball
- 1914–1917: Wisconsin

Coaching career (HC unless noted)

Basketball
- 1918–1919: Bradley
- 1919–1922: Ripon
- 1922–1946: Ohio State
- 1946–1949: Chicago Stags
- 1950–1952: Northwestern

Football
- 1919–1921: Ripon

Baseball
- 1919: Bradley

Head coaching record
- Overall: 311–241 (college basketball); 95–63 (BAA); 13–6–1 (college football); 0–1 (college baseball)
- Tournaments: 6–4

Accomplishments and honors

Championships
- Basketball; 5 Big Ten (1925, 1933, 1939, 1944, 1946); NCAA Runner-up (1939); 4 NCAA Division I Regional – Final Four (1939, 1944, 1945, 1946); Helms Foundation All-American (1917)
- Basketball Hall of Fame; Inducted in 1959 (profile)
- College Basketball Hall of Fame; Inducted in 2006

Harold G. Olsen (May 12, 1895 – October 29, 1953) was a college men's basketball coach. The Rice Lake, Wisconsin native was the head coach of the Ohio State University from 1922 to 1946. That year, he became the first head coach of the BAA's Chicago Stags, where he coached almost three seasons before being replaced by Philip Brownstein. Olsen also coached at Northwestern University (1950–1952).

While playing at University of Wisconsin–Madison (1914–1917), Olsen was named to the All-Big Ten twice for basketball. After graduating from Wisconsin, he began his coaching career at Bradley University and Ripon College. In 1922, Olsen followed George Trautman as head coach of the Ohio State University. In 24 years he guided the Buckeyes to a 259–197 record, as well as five Big Ten championships (1925, 1933, 1939, 1944, 1946). He served as a chair on the NCAA Basketball Committee. Olsen helped initiate the 10-second rule in 1937, which requires teams to advance the ball over the center line within 10 seconds of gaining possession. In 1939, Olsen spearheaded efforts to create the NCAA postseason national playoffs, now known as the NCAA tournament, one that could compete with the National Invitational Tournament, which started play in 1938 with games hosted at Madison Square Garden in New York. The first NCAA tournament in 1939 saw Northwestern University host eight teams. Oregon beat Ohio State to become the first tournament champion in a format that has expanded several times to go with its popularity as the premier tournament for college basketball.

In 1959, he was inducted to the Naismith Memorial Basketball Hall of Fame as a contributor.

== Head coaching record ==
=== College football ===
Year	Team	Overall	Conference	Standing	Bowl/playoffs
Ripon Crimson (Independent) (1919–1921)
1919	Ripon	6–1			
1920	Ripon	4–3			
1921	Ripon	3–2–1			
Ripon:		13–6–1			
Total:		13–6–1			

=== College basketball ===
Record table
Season	Team	Overall	Conference	Standing	Postseason
Bradley Indians (Independent) (1918–1919)
1918–19	Bradley	6–9			
Bradley:		6–9 (.400)			
Ripon Crimson (Independent) (1919–1922)
1919–20	Ripon	11–2			
1920–21	Ripon	9–3			
1921–22	Ripon	7–5			
Ripon:		27–10 (.730)			
Ohio State Buckeyes (Big Ten Conference) (1922–1946)
1922–23	Ohio State	4–11	1–11	T–9th	
1923–24	Ohio State	12–5	7–5	4th	
1924–25	Ohio State	14–2	11–1	1st	
1925–26	Ohio State	10–7	6–6	5th	
1926–27	Ohio State	11–6	6–6	7th	
1927–28	Ohio State	5–12	3–9	T–7th	
1928–29	Ohio State	9–8	6–6	T–5th	
1929–30	Ohio State	9–15	1–9	9th	
1930–31	Ohio State	4–13	3–9	9th	
1931–32	Ohio State	9–9	5–7	6th	
1932–33	Ohio State	17–3	10–2	T–1st	
1933–34	Ohio State	8–12	4–8	T–8th	
1934–35	Ohio State	12–7	8–4	T–4th	
1935–36	Ohio State	12–8	5–7	T–6th	
1936–37	Ohio State	13–7	7–5	5th	
1937–38	Ohio State	12–8	7–5	T–3rd	
1938–39	Ohio State	16–7	10–2	1st	NCAA Runner-up
1939–40	Ohio State	13–7	8–4	3rd	
1940–41	Ohio State	10–10	7–5	T–3rd	
1941–42	Ohio State	6–14	4–11	9th	
1942–43	Ohio State	8–9	5–7	T–6th	
1943–44	Ohio State	14–7	10–2	1st	NCAA Final Four
1944–45	Ohio State	15–5	10–2	2nd	NCAA Final Four
1945–46	Ohio State	16–5	10–2	1st	NCAA Final Four
Ohio State:		259–197 (.568)	154–135 (.533)		
Northwestern Wildcats (Big Ten Conference) (1950–1952)
1950–51	Northwestern	12–10	7–7	T–4th	
1951–52	Northwestern	7–15	4–10	T–8th	
Northwestern:		19–25 (.432)	11–17 (.393)		
Total:		311–241 (.563)			
National champion Postseason invitational champion Conference regular season champion Conference regular season and conference tournament champion Division regular season champion Division regular season and conference tournament champion Conference tournament champion

=== Professional basketball ===
Legend
Regular season	G	Games coached	W	Games won	L	Games lost	W–L %	Win–loss %
Playoffs	PG	Playoff games	PW	Playoff wins	PL	Playoff losses	PW–L %	Playoff win–loss %

Team	Year	G	W	L	W–L%	Finish	PG	PW	PL	PW–L%	Result
CHS	1946–47	61	39	22	.639	1st in Western	11	5	6	.455	Lost in BAA Finals
CHS	1947–48	48	28	20	.583	3rd in Western	5	2	3	.400	Lost in BAA Semifinals
CHS	1948–49	49	28	21	.571	3rd in Western	2	0	2	.000	Lost in BAA Div. Semifinals
Career		158	95	63	.601		18	7	11	.389	

== See also ==
- List of NCAA Division I Men's Final Four appearances by coach
