= 1943–44 Indiana Hoosiers men's basketball team =

American college basketball season

1943–44 Indiana Hoosiers men's basketball
- Conference: Big Ten Conference
- Record: 7–15 (2–10 Big Ten)
- Head coach: Harry Good (1st season)
- Captain: Paul Shields
- Home arena: The Fieldhouse

1943–44 Big Ten Conference men's basketball standings
	Conf.				Overall
Team	W		L	PCT	W		L	PCT
Ohio State	10	–	2	.833	14	–	7	.667
Iowa	9	–	3	.750	14	–	4	.778
Wisconsin	9	–	3	.750	12	–	9	.571
Northwestern	8	–	4	.667	12	–	7	.632
Purdue	8	–	4	.667	11	–	10	.524
Illinois	5	–	7	.417	11	–	9	.550
Michigan	5	–	7	.417	8	–	10	.444
Minnesota	2	–	10	.167	7	–	14	.333
Indiana	2	–	10	.167	7	–	15	.318
Chicago	0	–	8	.000	1	–	19	.050

The 1943–44 Indiana Hoosiers men's basketball team represented Indiana University. Because Branch McCracken left to serve in World War II, their head coach was Harry Good, who was in his 1st year. The team played its home games in The Fieldhouse in Bloomington, Indiana, and was a member of the Big Ten Conference.

The Hoosiers finished the regular season with an overall record of 7–15 and a conference record of 2–10, finishing 8th in the Big Ten Conference. Indiana was not invited to participate in any postseason tournament.

== Roster ==
No.	Name	Position	Ht.	Year	Hometown
4	Gene Farris	F	6–3	Fr.	Campbellsburg, Indiana
5	Ed Schienbein	G	5–9	Sr.	Southport, Indiana
6	Charles Traux	G	5–11	N/A	Spring Lake, New Jersey
7	George Tipton	C	6–3	Fr.	Terre Haute, Indiana
8	Don Earnhart	C	6–2	Fr.	Marion, Indiana
9	Jack Herron	G	5–8	So.	Logansport, Indiana
11	Jack Mercer	G	6–1	Fr.	Brazil, Indiana
14	Bob Rowland	G	6–1	Fr.	Martinsville, Indiana
16	John Crouch	C	6–3	So.	Evansville, Indiana
19	Sam Young	G	6–2	So.	Rushville, Indiana
22	Claude Retherford Jr.	F	6–1	Fr.	French Lick, Indiana
24	Herod Toon	G	5–10	Fr.	Indianapolis, Indiana
25	Richard Peed	C	6–3	N/A	Richmond, Indiana
30	Irvin Leary	F	5–11	Fr.	Greenfield, Indiana
32	Bob Ravensburg	F	6–1	So.	Bellevue, Kentucky
33	Paul Shields	F	6–2	Fr.	Monrovia, Indiana
37	Ray Brandenburg	G	5–10	Fr.	Corydon, Indiana
38	Les Ray	F	6–1	Fr.	Sullivan, Indiana
42	Ed Sidwell	G	6–2	Fr.	New Castle, Indiana
43	Art Lehman	F	6–1	Fr.	Cedar Lake, Indiana
N/A	Philip Bowser	F	6–2	Fr.	Goshen, Indiana
N/A	Pete Pithos	F	6–1	Jr.	Fort Wayne, Indiana

== Schedule/results ==
Date time, TV	Rank^{#}	Opponent^{#}	Result	Record	Site city, state
Regular season
12/1/1943*		Camp Atterbury	W 40–28	1–0	The Fieldhouse; Bloomington, Indiana
12/4/1943*		at DePauw	L 36–47	1–1	Bowman Gym; Greencastle, Indiana
12/7/1943*		at Wabash	W 38–35	2–1	Crawfordsville, Indiana
12/11/1943*		vs. Kentucky; Indiana–Kentucky rivalry	L 41–66	2–2	Jefferson County Armory; Louisville, Kentucky
12/14/1943*		Wabash	W 44–27	3–2	The Fieldhouse; Bloomington, Indiana
12/18/1943*		at DePaul	L 43–81	3–3	University Auditorium; Chicago, Illinois
12/20/1943*		DePauw	W 38–34	4–3	The Fieldhouse; Bloomington, Indiana
1/4/1944*		at Camp Atterbury	W 42–32	5–3	Camp Atterbury, Indiana
1/8/1944		at Purdue; Rivalry	L 43–63	5–4 (0–1)	Lambert Fieldhouse; West Lafayette, Indiana
1/14/1944		at Ohio State	L 46–72	5–5 (0–2)	Ohio Expo Center Coliseum; Columbus, Ohio
1/15/1944		at Ohio State	L 38–74	5–6 (0–3)	Ohio Expo Center Coliseum; Columbus, Ohio
1/22/1944*		Miami (OH)	L 50–52	5–7 (0–3)	The Fieldhouse; Bloomington, Indiana
1/28/1944		Iowa	L 42–43	5–8 (0–4)	The Fieldhouse; Bloomington, Indiana
1/29/1944		Iowa	L 40–52	5–9 (0–5)	The Fieldhouse; Bloomington, Indiana
2/4/1944		at Michigan	L 49–65	5–10 (0–6)	Yost Field House; Ann Arbor, Michigan
2/5/1944		at Michigan	L 44–46	5–11 (0–7)	Yost Field House; Ann Arbor, Michigan
2/11/1944		Wisconsin	L 43–62	5–12 (0–8)	The Fieldhouse; Bloomington, Indiana
2/12/1944		Wisconsin	L 31–52	5–13 (0–9)	The Fieldhouse; Bloomington, Indiana
2/18/1944		at Minnesota	L 47–48	5–14 (0–10)	Minnesota Field House; Minneapolis
2/19/1944		at Minnesota	W 48–47	6–14 (1–10)	Minnesota Field House; Minneapolis
2/26/1944*		Bunker Hill	L 36–41	6–15 (1–10)	The Fieldhouse; Bloomington, Indiana
2/4/1944		at Purdue; Rivalry	W 51–45	7–15 (2–10)	Lambert Fieldhouse; West Lafayette, Indiana
*Non-conference game. ^{#}Rankings from AP Poll. (#) Tournament seedings in parentheses.
