= 1944 NCAA basketball championship game =

American collegiate basketball final

1944 NCAA Tournament Championship Game
National championship game
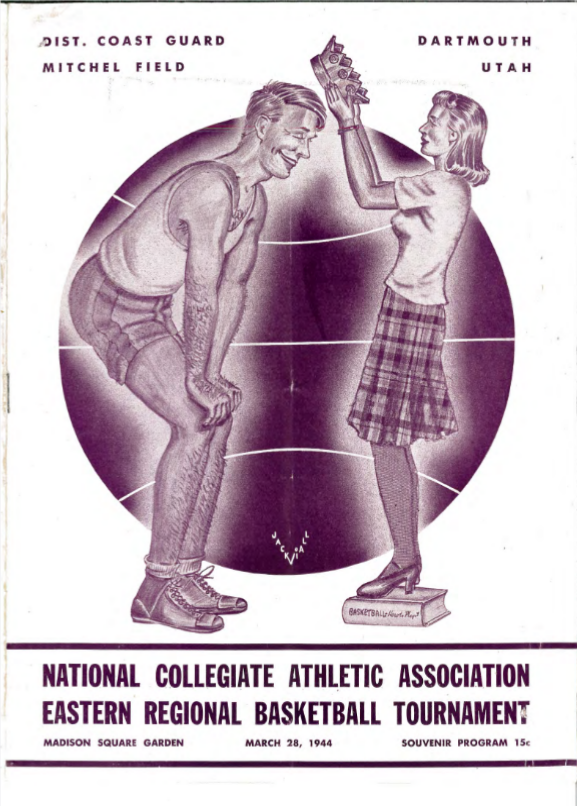
Utah Redskins	Dartmouth Indians
MSC	Ivy
(22-4)	(19-2)
42	40
Head coach: Vadal Peterson	Head coach: Earl Brown
	1st half	2nd half	OT	Total
Utah Redskins	17	19	6	42
Dartmouth Indians	18	18	4	40
- Date: March 28, 1944
- Venue: Madison Square Garden, New York City, New York
- MVP: Arnie Ferrin, Utah
- Attendance: 17,990

The 1944 NCAA Men's Division I Basketball Championship Game was the finals of the 1944 NCAA Division I men's basketball tournament, and it determined the national champion for the 1943-44 NCAA Division I men's basketball season. The 1944 National Title Game was played on March 28, 1944, and it was played at Madison Square Garden in New York City, New York.

== Background ==
=== Utah ===
The Utah Redskins were coached by Vadal Peterson, and this was the Utes' first and only National Championship. The team had only 9 lettermen, 7 of which were freshmen, including eventual All-American Arnie Ferrin. They went 22-4 that season, but would not have qualified for the tournament had the Arkansas team not been involved in an automobile accident that killed an assistant coach and a player. The Redskins were invited to replace the Razorbacks a mere two days before the tournament was set to commence. They would beat Missouri and then go on to beat Iowa State to win the championship. The Redskins would not go to another National Championship game until 1998 in which they lost. Utah was the first team to be in the National Invitation Tournament and the NCAA Division I men's basketball tournament both in the same season. Utah was an Independent that year.

=== Dartmouth ===
The Dartmouth Indians were led by Earl Brown to their second and final National Championship appearance. Dartmouth beat Catholic University, and then faced off Ohio State until they got to the championship. The Indians went 19–2 that year. Dartmouth was and is still part of the Ivy League. The Indians were led by All-American Aud Brindley and experienced significant roster turnover due to World War II. The Indians lost lettermen Larry Killick, Joe Fater, Larry Baxter, John Monahan and Paul Campbell to the draft, but added standout players Dick McGuire of St. John's and Bob Gale of Cornell, who were transferred to Dartmouth as a part of their military training program.

== Game summary ==
With 17,990 fans watching the game in New York, Utah hung tight with Dartmouth, who was favored by eight points prior to the game. For the first time in NCAA Championship Game history, an overtime period was required to determine a winner. Such overtime would not happen again until 1957. The next night, Utah played the winner of the National Invitational Tournament in St. John's as a charity event and won 43–36.

== See also ==
- 1944 NCAA basketball tournament
