= John Long (basketball coach) =

American basketball coach

Playing career
- 1925–1928: Catholic University

Coaching career (HC unless noted)
- 1943–1944: Catholic University

Head coaching record
- Overall: 17–7
- Tournaments: 0–2 (NCAA)

John J. Long was an American college basketball coach. He was the head basketball coach at Catholic University of America in 1943-44. He coached Catholic to a 17–7 record and berth in the 1944 NCAA basketball tournament. Longwas an athlete at Catholic, playing basketball from 1925 to 1928. He was inducted into the Catholic athletics Hall of Fame in 1977.

== Head coaching record ==
Record table
Season	Team	Overall	Conference	Standing	Postseason
Catholic University Cardinals (Independent) (1943–1944)
1943–44	Catholic University	17–7			NCAA Regional Fourth Place
Catholic University:		17–7 (.708)			
Total:		17–7 (.708)			
