= 1943–44 Illinois Fighting Illini men's basketball team =

American college basketball season

1943–44 Illinois Fighting Illini men's basketball
- Conference: Big Ten Conference
- Record: 11–9 (5–7 Big Ten)
- Head coach: Douglas R. Mills (8th season)
- Assistant coaches: Howie Braun (7th season); Wally Roettger (9th season)
- MVP: Stan Patrick
- Captain: Selected each game
- Home arena: Huff Hall

1943–44 Big Ten Conference men's basketball standings
	Conf.				Overall
Team	W		L	PCT	W		L	PCT
Ohio State	10	–	2	.833	14	–	7	.667
Iowa	9	–	3	.750	14	–	4	.778
Wisconsin	9	–	3	.750	12	–	9	.571
Northwestern	8	–	4	.667	12	–	7	.632
Purdue	8	–	4	.667	11	–	10	.524
Illinois	5	–	7	.417	11	–	9	.550
Michigan	5	–	7	.417	8	–	10	.444
Minnesota	2	–	10	.167	7	–	14	.333
Indiana	2	–	10	.167	7	–	15	.318
Chicago	0	–	8	.000	1	–	19	.050

The 1943–44 Illinois Fighting Illini men's basketball team represented the University of Illinois.

== Regular season ==
March 1, 1943, changed the future of Fighting Illini men's basketball when the team was broken up due to all five starters from back-to-back Big Ten Conference championships heading to active duty in the armed forces. The group who left, known as the Whiz Kids, consisted of 21-year-old All-America forward Andy Phillip and 20-year-olds Ken Menke, Gene Vance, Jack Smiley and Art Mathisen. Phillip went on to become a member of the Naismith Basketball Hall of Fame. Four of the five, minus Mathisen, returned to Illinois and tried to recapture the glory for one more season in 1946–47 after the war ended, but the chemistry had changed as well as their talent. Illinois went 14–6.

The 1943–44 season, however, was a struggle for head coach Doug Mills, as it was the second worst season of his career. The overall record was 11 wins and 9 losses with a conference mark of 5 and 7. The team finished with a 6–4 record at home and a .500 record on the road at 5–5. The Illini returned only one player from the 1942–43 season, Gordon Horton, who wasn't even a starter, which meant the entire lineup was made up of rookie/unproven players. The starting lineup consisted of Walton Kirk, Howard Judson, Ray DeMoulin, Bob Morton, Don Delaney and Gordon Gillespie.

=== Roster ===
1943–44 Illinois Fighting Illini men's basketball team
Players
Coaches

Pos.	#	Name	Height	Weight	Year	Hometown
F	4	Ray DeMoulin	—	—	Fr	Mulberry Grove, Illinois
C	5	Gordon Gillespie	—	—	Fr	Chicago, Illinois
G	6	Stan Patrick	—	—	Sr	Chicago, Illinois
C	7	Don Delaney	—	—	So	Sacramento, California
G/F	8	Howard Judson	—	—	Fr	Hebron, Illinois
G	9	Walt Kirk	—	—	So	Mt. Vernon, Illinois
G	10	Gordon Hortin	—	—	Jr	Evansville, Indiana
F	11	Jake Staab	—	—	So	Chillicothe, Illinois
G	12	Jim Seyler	—	—	So	Champaign, Illinois
G/F	13	Bob Morton	—	—	Fr	Elgin, Illinois
G	14	Richard Foley	—	—	Fr	Paris, Illinois
F	15	William Eddleman	—	—	So	Anna, Illinois
C	16	Kermit Knetsch	—	—	So	Paw Paw, Illinois
C	17	John Larson	—	—	So	Sioux City, Iowa
F	18	Lou Possehl	—	—	Sr	Chicago, Illinois
G	19	Leo Gedvillas	—	—	So	Spring Valley, Illinois
F	20	Bob White	—	—	So	Rockford, Illinois
C	21	Morris Dolan	—	—	So	Trenton, Missouri
G	22	Lee Stickler	—	—	So	Alton, Illinois
G	23	Raymond Fregan	—	—	So	Brookfield, Illinois
G	24	Donald Sudkamp	—	—	Fr	Champaign, Illinois

Head coach

- Douglas Mills (University of Illinois) (8th year)

Assistant coach(es)

- Wally Roettger (University of Illinois) (9th year)
- Howie Braun (University of Illinois) (7th year)

Legend

- (C) Team captain
- (S) Suspended
- (I) Ineligible
- (W) Walk-on
- Injured
- Current redshirt

Roster

== Schedule ==
Date time, TV	Rank^{#}	Opponent^{#}	Result	Record	Site (attendance) city, state
Non-Conference regular season
12/4/1943*		Alumni	W 53–35	1–0	Huff Hall (3,041); Champaign, IL
12/7/1943*		Detroit	W 56–25	2–0	Huff Hall (2,011); Champaign, IL
12/11/1943*		at Great Lakes	L 44–52	2–1	Chicago Stadium (12,000); Chicago, IL
12/18/1943*		at Missouri; Rivalry	W 39–29	3–1	Brewer Fieldhouse (–); Columbia, MO
12/20/1943*		Kentucky	W 43–41	4–1	Huff Hall (2,719); Champaign, IL
12/29/1943*		Great Lakes	W 64–51	5–1	Huff Hall (4,429); Champaign, IL
Big Ten regular season
1/3/1944		at Wisconsin	W 45–43	6–1 (1–0)	Wisconsin Field House (–); Madison, WI
1/7/1944		Wisconsin	L 38–43	6–2 (1–1)	Huff Hall (4,660); Champaign, IL
1/8/1944		at Michigan	L 45–52	6–3 (1–2)	Yost Field House (–); Ann Arbor, MI
1/15/1944		at University of Chicago	W 69–32	7–3 (2–2)	Henry Crown Field House (300); Chicago, IL
1/21/1944		at Iowa; Rivalry	L 51–62	7–4 (2–3)	Iowa Field House (–); Iowa City, IA
1/22/1944		at Iowa; Rivalry	L 44–53	7–5 (2–4)	Iowa Field House (–); Iowa City, IA
2/7/1944*		at Kentucky	L 40–51	7–6	Alumni Gymnasium (2,900); Lexington, KY
2/11/1944		Northwestern; Rivalry	L 29–42	7–7 (2–5)	Huff Hall (2,834); Champaign, IL
2/12/1944*		at DePaul	W 45–33	8–7	DePaul Auditorium (–); Chicago, IL
2/18/1944		Ohio State	L 41–52	8–8 (2–6)	Huff Hall (2,577); Champaign, IL
2/19/1944		Ohio State	L 53–54	8–9 (2–7)	Huff Hall (2,717); Champaign, IL
2/25/1944		at Northwestern; Rivalry	W 50–47	9–9 (3–7)	Patten Gymnasium (–); Evanston, IL
3/3/1944		Minnesota	W 50–32	10–9 (4–7)	Huff Hall (2,420); Champaign, IL
3/3/1944		Minnesota	W 53–27	11–9 (5–7)	Huff Hall (2,717); Champaign, IL
*Non-conference game. ^{#}Rankings from AP Poll. (#) Tournament seedings in parentheses. All times are in Central Time.

== Player stats ==
Player	Games played	Field goals	Free throws	Points
Stan Patrick	20	97	46	240
Walt Kirk	20	84	55	223
Howard Judson	20	74	12	160
Gordon Gillespie	20	20	26	55
Jimmy Seyler	20	18	13	49
Dick Foley	6	20	8	48
Don Delaney	11	18	6	42
Jake Staab	12	14	12	40
Robert Morton	16	13	3	29
Ray DeMoulin	12	11	1	23
Gordon Hortin	11	4	2	10
Kermit Knetsch	6	4	1	9
Lou Possehl	7	3	2	8
Jack Larson	6	2	1	5
Donald Sudkamp	3	2	0	4
Bob White	4	1	1	3
Leo Gedvilas	1	1	0	2
Lee Stickler	2	0	0	0
Raymond Fregan	1	0	0	0
Maurice Dolan	1	0	0	0
Carl Bontemps	1	0	0	0

== Awards and honors ==
- Walt Kirk
  - Converse Honorable Mention All-American (1944)
- Stan Patrick
  - Team Most Valuable Player
