= Earl Brown (coach) =

American football and basketball player and coach (1915–2003)

Biographical details
- Born: October 23, 1915
- Died: September 23, 2003 (aged 87); Leesburg, Florida, U.S.

Playing career

Football
- 1936–1938: Notre Dame

Basketball
- 1936–1939: Notre Dame
- Position: End (football)

Coaching career (HC unless noted)

Football
- 1939: Brown (ends)
- 1940–1942: Harvard (ends)
- 1943–1944: Dartmouth
- 1945: Merchant Marine
- 1946–1947: Canisius
- 1948–1950: Auburn

Basketball
- 1941–1943: Harvard
- 1943–1944: Dartmouth
- 1945–1946: Merchant Marine
- 1946–1948: Canisius

Head coaching record
- Overall: 27–36–6 (football); 72–70 (basketball)
- Tournaments: Basketball; 2–1 (NCAA)

Accomplishments and honors

Championships
- Football; Western New York Little Three (1947)

Awards
- First-team All-American (1938)

Earl M. Brown Jr. (October 23, 1915 – September 23, 2003) was an American football and basketball player and coach. He served as the head football coach at Dartmouth College (1943–1944), the United States Merchant Marine Academy (1945), Canisius College (1946–1947), and Auburn University (1948–1950), compiling a career college football record of 27–36–6. Brown was also the head basketball coach at Harvard University (1941–1943), Dartmouth (1943–1944), the United States Merchant Marine Academy (1945–1946), and Canisius (1946–1948), tallying a career college basketball mark of 72–70. He led Dartmouth to the finals of the 1944 NCAA basketball tournament.

Brown is notorious for his stretch at as football coach at Auburn, where he went 3–22–4, including a record of 0–10 in his final season, when the Tigers were outscored 285–31. Brown's first season as the head coach at Auburn was also the first season Auburn and the Alabama met on the gridiron since 1907; Auburn lost, 55–0. The next season, though, he coached Auburn to one of the greatest upsets in its history, when the Tigers, who entered the game with a record of 1–4–3, stunned heavily favored Alabama, who entered the game with a 6–2–1 record, 14–13.

Brown played football and basketball at the University of Notre Dame. He was an assistant coach at Harvard, Brown, and the head coach at Dartmouth from 1943 to 1944, where he compiled a record of 8–6–1. In 1945, he posted a 5–3 record in his only season as the head coach at the United States Merchant Marine Academy. After leaving Auburn, Brown later served as an assistant coach for the Detroit Lions.

Brown died on September 23, 2003, in Leesburg, Florida.

== Head coaching record ==
=== Football ===
Year	Team	Overall	Conference	Standing	Bowl/playoffs	AP^{#}
Dartmouth Indians (Independent) (1943–1944)
1943	Dartmouth	6–1				16
1944	Dartmouth	2–5–1				
Dartmouth:		8–6–1				
Merchant Marine Mariners (Independent) (1945)
1945	Merchant Marine	5–3				
Merchant Marine:		5–3				
Canisius Golden Griffins (Western New York Little Three Conference) (1946–1947)
1946	Canisius	4–3–1	1–1	2nd		
1947	Canisius	7–2	2–0	1st		
Canisius:		11–5–1	3–1			
Auburn Tigers (Southeastern Conference) (1948–1950)
1948	Auburn	1–8–1	0–7	12th		
1949	Auburn	2–4–3	2–4–2	8th		
1950	Auburn	0–10	0–7	12th		
Auburn:		3–22–4	2–18–2			
Total:		27–36–6				
^{#}Rankings from final AP Poll.

=== Basketball ===
Record table
Season	Team	Overall	Conference	Standing	Postseason
Harvard Crimson (Eastern Intercollegiate Basketball League) (1941–1942)
1941–42	Harvard	8–16	5–7	T–4th	
1942–43	Harvard	12–14	4–8	6th	
Harvard:		20–30 (.400)	9–15 (.375)		
Dartmouth Big Green (Eastern Intercollegiate Basketball League) (1943–1944)
1943–44	Dartmouth	19–2	8–0	1st	NCAA Runner-up
Dartmouth:		19–2 (.905)	8–0 (1.000)		
Merchant Marine Mariners (Independent) (1945–1946)
1945–46	Merchant Marine	5–10			
Merchant Marine:		5–10 (.333)			
Canisius Golden Griffins (Western New York Little Three Conference) (1946–1948)
1946–47	Canisius	18–13	3–0	1st	
1947–48	Canisius	10–15	2–2	2nd	
Canisius:		28–28 (.500)	5–2 (.714)		
Total:		72–70 (.507)			
National champion Postseason invitational champion Conference regular season champion Conference regular season and conference tournament champion Division regular season champion Division regular season and conference tournament champion Conference tournament champion

== See also ==
- List of NCAA Division I Men's Final Four appearances by coach
