= 1943–44 Ohio State Buckeyes men's basketball team =

American college basketball season

1943–44 Ohio State Buckeyes men's basketball
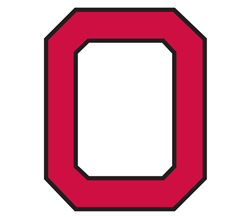

Big Ten Champions

NCAA tournament, Final Four
- Conference: Big Ten Conference
- Record: 14–7 (10–2 Big Ten)
- Head coach: Harold Olsen (22nd season)
- Assistant coach: J. E. Blickle
- Home arena: Fairgrounds Coliseum

1943–44 Big Ten Conference men's basketball standings
	Conf.				Overall
Team	W		L	PCT	W		L	PCT
Ohio State	10	–	2	.833	14	–	7	.667
Iowa	9	–	3	.750	14	–	4	.778
Wisconsin	9	–	3	.750	12	–	9	.571
Northwestern	8	–	4	.667	12	–	7	.632
Purdue	8	–	4	.667	11	–	10	.524
Illinois	5	–	7	.417	11	–	9	.550
Michigan	5	–	7	.417	8	–	10	.444
Minnesota	2	–	10	.167	7	–	14	.333
Indiana	2	–	10	.167	7	–	15	.318
Chicago	0	–	8	.000	1	–	19	.050

The 1943–44 Ohio State Buckeyes men's basketball team represented Ohio State University as a member of the Big Ten Conference during the 1943–44 NCAA men's basketball season. The team's head coach was Harold Olsen and they played their home games at the Fairgrounds Coliseum. Ohio State finished Big Ten play atop the standings with a 10–2 record. The Buckeyes were one of eight teams selected to play in the NCAA tournament where they reached the second Final Four in program history before losing to Dartmouth in the East regional final.

== Roster ==
1943–44 Ohio State Buckeyes men's basketball team
Players	Coaches
Pos. / # / Name / Height / Weight / Year / Hometown	Head coach: Harold Olsen (Wisconsin); Assistant coach(es) Legend: (C) Team captain; (S) Suspended; (I) Ineligible; (W) Walk-on; Injured; Current redshirt

== Schedule and results ==
Date time, TV	Rank^{#}	Opponent^{#}	Result	Record	Site city, state
Regular season
NCAA tournament
Mar 24, 1944*		vs. Temple; National Quarterfinal – Elite Eight	W 57–47	14–6	Madison Square Garden; New York, New York
Mar 25, 1944*		vs. Dartmouth; National Semifinal – Final Four	L 53–60	14–7	Madison Square Garden; New York, New York
*Non-conference game. ^{#}Rankings from AP Poll. (#) Tournament seedings in parentheses. E=East.
