= 1944 NCAA basketball tournament =

Edition of USA college basketball tournament

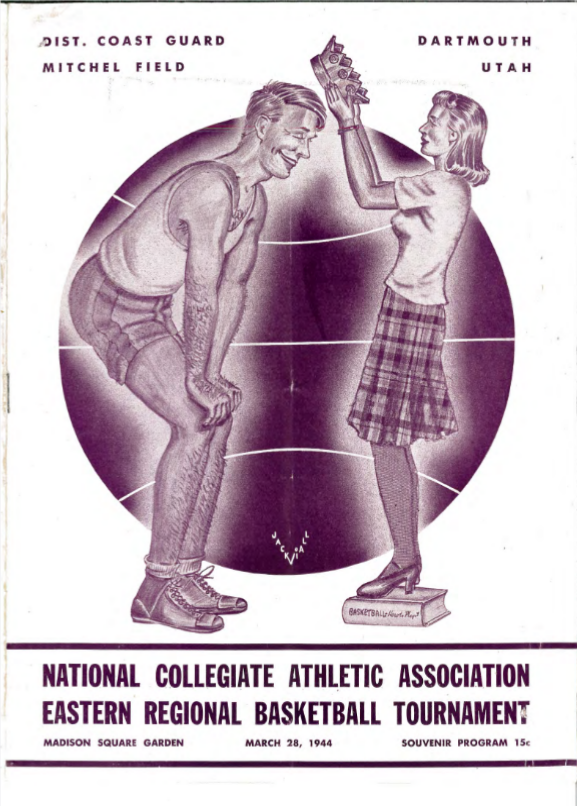
- Program from the east regional tournament
- Teams: 8
- Finals site: Madison Square Garden, New York City, New York
- Champions: Utah Redskins (1st title, 1st title game, 1st Final Four)
- Runner-up: Dartmouth Indians (2nd title game, 2nd Final Four)
- Semifinalists: Iowa State Cyclones (1st Final Four); Ohio State Buckeyes (2nd Final Four)
- Winning coach: Vadal Peterson (1st title)
- MOP: Arnie Ferrin (Utah)
- Attendance: 59,369
- Top scorer: Audley Brindley (Dartmouth) (52 points)

The 1944 NCAA basketball tournament involved eight schools playing in single-elimination play to determine the national champion of the 1943–44 NCAA men's basketball season. The 6th annual edition of the tournament began on March 24, 1944, and ended with the championship game on March 28, at Madison Square Garden in New York City. A total of nine games were played, including a third place game in each region.

Utah, coached by Vadal Peterson, won the national title with a 42–40 victory in the final game over Dartmouth, coached by Earl Brown. Arnie Ferrin of Utah was named the tournament's Most Outstanding Player. Utah became the third team to play in both the NIT and NCAA tournament in the same season. Utah was given a second chance to play in the NCAA Tournament after a March 1944 automobile accident killed a coaching aide and seriously injured two players on the Arkansas team.

Utah's winning team featured Wataru Misaka, who later joined the New York Knicks to become the first person of color (in his case, being an Asian-American by being of Japanese descent) to play in modern professional basketball.

== Locations ==
The following are the sites selected to host each round of the 1944 tournament:

=== Regionals ===
March 24 and 25
East Regional, Madison Square Garden, New York, New York (Host: Metropolitan New York Conference)
West Regional, Municipal Auditorium, Kansas City, Missouri (Host: Missouri Valley Conference)

=== Championship Game ===
March 28
Madison Square Garden, New York, New York (Host: Metropolitan New York Conference)

== Teams ==
Region	Team	Coach	Conference	Finished	Final Opponent	Score
East
East	Catholic	John Long	Independent	Regional Fourth Place	Temple	L 55–35
East	Dartmouth	Earl Brown	EIBL	Runner Up	Utah	L 42–40
East	Ohio State	Harold Olsen	Big Ten	National Semifinals	Dartmouth	L 60–53
East	Temple	Josh Cody	Middle Atlantic	Regional third place	Catholic	W 55–35
West
West	Iowa State	Louis Menze	Big Six	National Semifinals	Utah	L 40–31
West	Missouri	George R. Edwards	Big Six	Regional third place	Pepperdine	W 61–46
West	Pepperdine	Al Duer	Independent	Regional Fourth Place	Missouri	L 61–46
West	Utah	Vadal Peterson	Skyline	Champion*	Dartmouth	W 42–40^{OT}

== Bracket ==
Quarterfinals
Dartmouth	63
Catholic	38
Ohio State	57
Temple	47
Iowa State	44
Pepperdine	39
Utah	45
Missouri	35

Semifinals
Dartmouth	60
Ohio State	53
Iowa State	31
Utah	40

Finals
Dartmouth	40
Utah	42^{OT}

=== Regional third place ===
East Regional third place
Catholic	35
Temple	55

West Regional third place
Pepperdine	46
Missouri	61

== See also ==
- 1944 National Invitation Tournament
- 1944 NAIA Division I men's basketball tournament
