= 1943–44 Utah Redskins men's basketball team =

American college basketball season

1943–44 Utah Redskins men's basketball
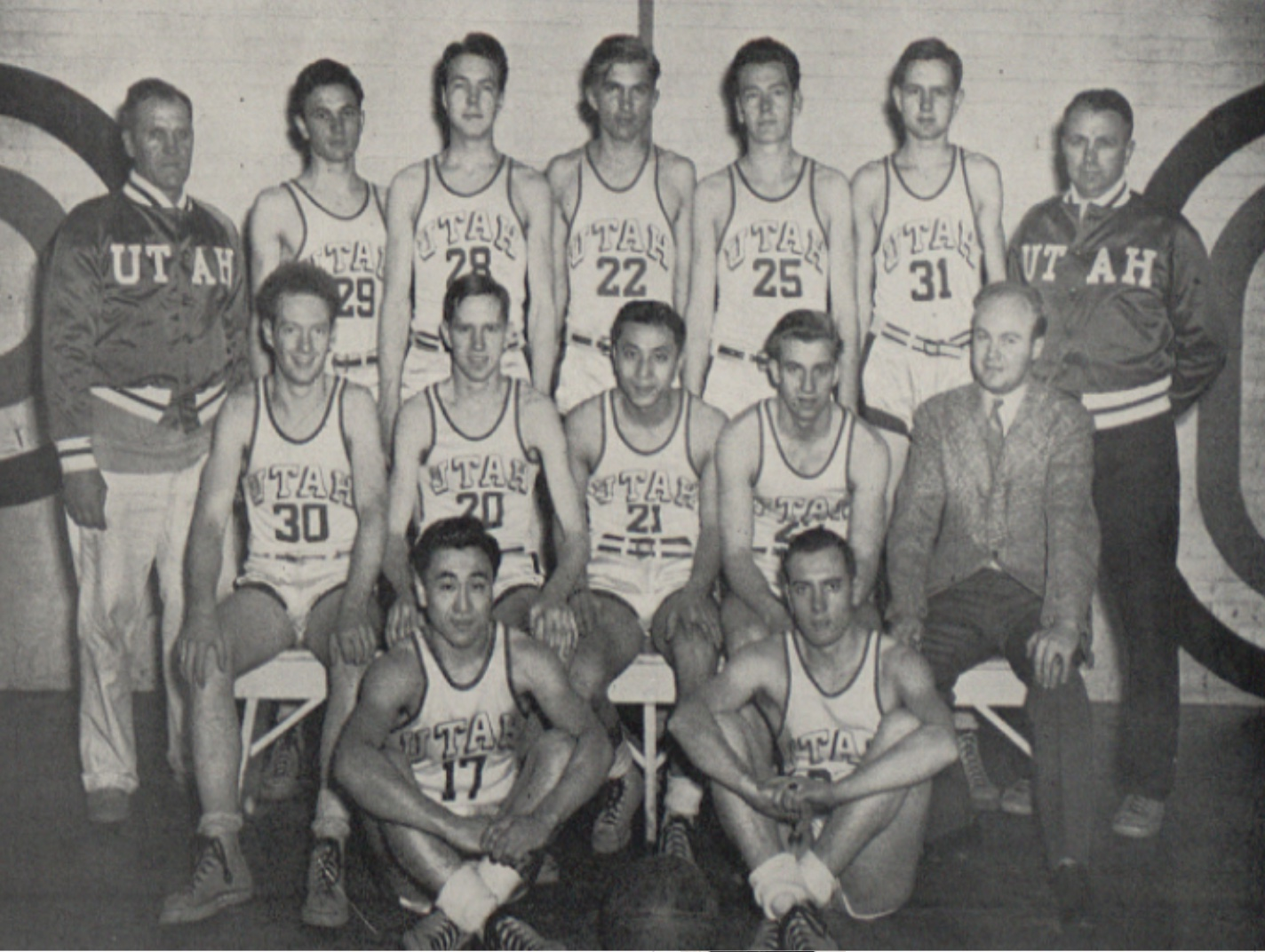

NCAA tournament National champions

National Championship Game, W 42–40^{OT} vs. Dartmouth
- Conference: Mountain States Conference
- Record: 22–4 ( Mountain States)
- Head coach: Vadal Peterson

The 1943–44 Utah Redskins men's basketball team represented the University of Utah during the 1943–44 NCAA men's basketball season. The Redskins captured the Mountain States Conference championship and its only national championship.

Utah was given an opportunity to compete in the NCAA tournament through an unusual circumstance. The University of Arkansas Razorbacks squad, who were supposed to appear in the tournament, were victimized by an automobile accident. Prior to the tournament, two of Arkansas’ starters were injured when their station wagon broke down after returning from a scrimmage in Fort Smith, Arkansas. While attempting to fix a flat tire, Deno Nichols and Ben Jones were injured when another car rammed into the back of the station wagon. Both players were injured. The severity of the accident caused Arkansas to withdraw from the upcoming NCAA tournament and the Redskins were tapped as a replacement.

== Schedule and results ==
Date time, TV	Rank^{#}	Opponent^{#}	Result	Record	Site city, state
Regular Season
November 12, 1943		18th Replacement Wing	W 48–24	1–0	Nielsen Fieldhouse; Salt Lake City, UT
November 19, 1943		A.S.T.P. Company D	W 51–21	2–0	Nielsen Fieldhouse; Salt Lake City, UT
November 22, 1943		A.S.T.P. Company B	W 76–24	3–0	Nielsen Fieldhouse; Salt Lake City, UT
November 24, 1943		A.S.T.P. ERC	W 71–17	4–0	Nielsen Fieldhouse; Salt Lake City, UT
November 26, 1943		at Hill Field Fliers	W 61–26	5–0	Ogden, UT
December 4, 1943		at Weber	W 63–25	6–0	Ogden, UT
December 4, 1943		at Weber Navy	W 60–25	7–0	Ogden, UT
December 16, 1943		at Kearns 2nd Air Force	W 45–35	8–0	Kearns, UT
January 4, 1944		Fort Douglas	W 41–26	9–0	Nielsen Fieldhouse; Salt Lake City, UT
January 6, 1944		at Wendover Bomber Quin.	W 64–28	10–0	Wendover, UT
January 15, 1944		Idaho State	W 54–43	11–0	Nielsen Fieldhouse; Salt Lake City, UT
January 22, 1944		Ecker Studio	W 46–44	12–0	Nielsen Fieldhouse; Salt Lake City, UT
January 28, 1944		at Colorado College	W 48–34	13–0	Colorado Springs, CO
January 29, 1944		at Fort Logan	W 55–38	14–0	Denver, CO
January 31, 1944		at Fort Warren	L 59–61	14–1	Cheyenne, WY
February 5, 1944		Kearns	W 57–37	15–1	Nielsen Fieldhouse; Salt Lake City, UT
February 12, 1944		Salt Lake Air Base	L 39–54	15–2	Nielsen Fieldhouse; Salt Lake City, UT
February 16, 1944		Bushnel Hospital	W 78–31	16–2	Nielsen Fieldhouse; Salt Lake City, UT
February 19, 1944		at Idaho State	W 52–40	17–2	Pocatello, ID
February 26, 1944		Dow Chemical	L 36–46	17–3	Nielsen Fieldhouse; Salt Lake City, UT
March 4, 1944		Salt Lake Air Base	W 62–38	18–3	Nielsen Fieldhouse; Salt Lake City, UT
NIT
March 20, 1944		vs. Kentucky	L 38–46	18–4	Madison Square Garden; New York, NY
NCAA tournament
March 24, 1944		vs. Missouri; Quarterfinals	W 45–35	19–4	Municipal Auditorium; Kansas City, MO
March 25, 1944		vs. Iowa State; Semifinals	W 40–31	20–4	Municipal Auditorium; Kansas City, MO
March 28, 1944		vs. Dartmouth; Championship	W 42–40 ^{OT}	21–4	Madison Square Garden; New York, NY
Red Cross Benefit Game
March 30, 1944		vs. St. John's; Red Cross Benefit Game	W 43–36	22–4	Madison Square Garden (18,125); New York, NY
*Non-conference game. ^{#}Rankings from AP Poll. (#) Tournament seedings in parentheses.

== Postseason ==
=== National Invitation Tournament ===
Utah competed in the 1944 National Invitation Tournament and lost its quarterfinal match.

- Quarterfinal
  - Kentucky 46, Utah 38

=== NCAA tournament ===
In need of a replacement, the NCAA committee turned to Utah, despite the fact that the Redskins had 4 losses and had just lost their first-round game in the NIT tournament. Utah had one player, Lyman Condie, a medical student, who midway through the season quit the team to pursue medical school. Additionally, all of Utah's players were raised within 30 miles of the Utah campus. These players included Arnie Ferrin, Fred Sheffield, and Wat Misaka, who was of Japanese descent.

- West
  - Utah 45, Missouri 35
- Final Four
  - Utah 40, Iowa State 31
- Championship
  - Utah 42, Dartmouth 40 (OT)

== Awards and honors ==
- Arnie Ferrin, NCAA Men's MOP Award
