= 1943–44 Dartmouth Indians men's basketball team =

American college basketball season

1943–44 Dartmouth Big Green men's basketball

NCAA tournament, Runner-up EIBL champions

National Championship Game, L 40-42 ^{OT} vs. Utah
- Conference: Eastern Intercollegiate Basketball League
- Record: 19–2 (8–0 EIBL)
- Head coach: Earl Brown (1st season)
- Captain: Aud Brindley
- Home arena: Alumni Gym

1943–44 Eastern Intercollegiate Basketball League standings
	Conf.				Overall
Team	W		L	PCT	W		L	PCT
Dartmouth	8	–	0	1.000	19	–	2	.905
Pennsylvania	6	–	2	.750	10	–	4	.714
Cornell	2	–	6	.250	9	–	11	.450
Columbia	2	–	6	.250	7	–	9	.438
Princeton	2	–	6	.250	6	–	12	.333

The 1943–44 Dartmouth Indians men's basketball team represented Dartmouth College during the 1943–44 NCAA men's basketball season. The team, led by head coach Earl Brown, played their home games at Alumni Gym and were members of the Eastern Intercollegiate Basketball League (EIBL). They finished the season 19–2, 8–0 in EIBL play to win the league title. Dartmouth was one of eight teams to receive an invitation to the NCAA tournament where they finished runner-up for the second time in three seasons.

== Roster ==
1943–44 Dartmouth Big Green men's basketball team
Players
Coaches

Pos.	#	Name	Height	Weight	Year	Hometown
G		Dick McGuire	6 ft 0 in (1.83 m)	170 lb (77 kg)	So	La Salle Academy	The Bronx, New York
F		Aud Brindley	6 ft 4 in (1.93 m)	170 lb (77 kg)	Jr	Rockville	Rockville Centre, New York

Head coach

- Earl Brown

Assistant coach(es)

Legend

- (C) Team captain
- (S) Suspended
- (I) Ineligible
- (W) Walk-on
- Injured
- Current redshirt

== Schedule ==
Date time, TV	Opponent	Result	Record	Site (attendance) city, state
Regular season
Dec 4, 1943	at Princeton	W 45–34	1–0 (1–0)	University Gymnasium; Princeton, New Jersey
Dec 11, 1943	Cornell	W 52–39	2–0 (2–0)	Alumni Gym; Hanover, New Hampshire
NCAA tournament
Mar 24, 1944*	vs. Catholic; East Regional Semifinal – Elite Eight	W 63–38	18–1	Madison Square Garden; New York, New York
Mar 25, 1944*	vs. Ohio State; East Regional Final / National Semifinal – Final Four	W 60–53	19–1	Madison Square Garden; New York, New York
Mar 28, 1944*	vs. Utah; NCAA Championship game	L 40–42 ^{OT}	19–2	Madison Square Garden; New York, New York
*Non-conference game. ^{#}Rankings from AP Poll. (#) Tournament seedings in parentheses. All times are in Eastern Time.
