= List of St. John's Red Storm men's basketball seasons =

This is a list of seasons completed by the St. John's Red Storm men's college basketball team.

== Seasons ==
Record table
Season	Coach	Overall	Conference	Standing	Postseason
(Independent) (1907–1912)
1907–08	Rev. J. Chestnut	4–8			
1908–09	P. Joseph Kersey	9–6			
1909–10	Harry Fisher	15–5			
1910–11	Claude Allen	14–0			Helms National Champion^{[Note A]}
1911–12	Joseph O'Shea	15–5			
Claude Allen (Independent) (1912–1914)
1912–13	Claude Allen	12–8			
1913–14	Claude Allen	7–11			
Claude Allen:		33–19			
Joseph O'Shea (Independent) (1914–1917)
1914–15	Joseph O'Shea	12–4			
1915–16	Joseph O'Shea	5–10			
1916–17	Joseph O'Shea	11–8			
Joseph O'Shea:		43–27			
John Crenny (Independent) (1917–1921)
1917–18	John Crenny	8–8			
1918–19	John Crenny	0–7			
1919–20	John Crenny	9–14			
1920–21	John Crenny	10–9			
John Crenny:		27–38			
Edward Kelleher (Independent) (1921–1922)
1921–22	Edward Kelleher	10–11			
Edward Kelleher:		10–11			
John Crenny (Independent) (1922–1927)
1922–23	John Crenny	11–10			
1923–24	John Crenny	16–15			
1924–25	John Crenny	18–6			
1925–26	John Crenny	18–7			
1926–27	John Crenny	15–10			
John Crenny:		105–86			
James "Buck" Freeman (Independent) (1927–1933)
1927–28	James Freeman	18–4			
1928–29	James Freeman	23–2			
1929–30	James Freeman	23–1			
1930–31	James Freeman	21–1			
1931–32	James Freeman	22–4			
1932–33	James Freeman	23–4			
James "Buck" Freeman (Metropolitan New York Conference) (1933–1936)
1933–34	James Freeman	16–3	3–4	5th	
1934–35	James Freeman	13–8	–	–	
1935–36	James Freeman	18–4	4–3	4th	
James Freeman:		177–31			
Joseph Lapchick (Metropolitan New York Conference) (1936–1947)
1936–37	Joseph Lapchick	12–7	1–4	7th	
1937–38	Joseph Lapchick	15–4	4–2	T–4th	
1938–39	Joseph Lapchick	18–4	17–2	2nd	NIT Fourth Place
1939–40	Joseph Lapchick	15–5	–	–	NIT Quarterfinal
1940–41	Joseph Lapchick	11–6	–	–	
1941–42	Joseph Lapchick	16–5	–	–	
1942–43	Joseph Lapchick	21–3	6–1	1st	NIT Champion
1943–44	Joseph Lapchick	18–5	–	–	NIT Champion
1944–45	Joseph Lapchick	21–3	–	–	NIT Third Place
1945–46	Joseph Lapchick	17–6	5–1	T–1st	NIT Quarterfinal
1946–47	Joseph Lapchick	16–7	6–0	1st	NIT Quarterfinal
Joseph Lapchick:		180–55			
Frank McGuire (Metropolitan New York Conference) (1947–1952)
1947–48	Frank McGuire	12–11	3–3	T–4th	
1948–49	Frank McGuire	15–9	5–1	T–1st	NIT First Round
1949–50	Frank McGuire	24–5	3–3	T–3rd	NIT Third Place
1950–51	Frank McGuire	26–5	6–0	1st	NIT Third Place; NCAA Elite Eight
1951–52	Frank McGuire	25–6	6–0	1st	NIT Quarterfinal; NCAA Runner-up
Frank McGuire:		102–36			
Al "Dusty" DeStefano (Metropolitan New York Conference) (1952–1956)
1952–53	Al DeStefano	17–6	5–1	2nd	NIT Runner-up
1953–54	Al DeStefano	9–11	2–3	5th	
1954–55	Al DeStefano	11–9	5–1	2nd	
1955–56	Al DeStefano	12–12	3–3	T–3rd	
Al DeStefano:		49–39			
Joseph Lapchick (Metropolitan New York Conference) (1956–1963)
1956–57	Joseph Lapchick	14–9	4–2	2nd	
1957–58	Joseph Lapchick	18–8	6–0	1st	NIT Fourth Place
1958–59	Joseph Lapchick	20–6	4–2	3rd	NIT Champion
1959–60	Joseph Lapchick	17–8	5–1	2nd	NIT Quarterfinal
1960–61	Joseph Lapchick	20–5	4–0	1st	NCAA University Division First Round
1961–62	Joseph Lapchick	21–5	5–0	1st	NIT Runner-up
1962–63	Joseph Lapchick	9–15	2–2	4th	
Joseph Lapchick (Independent) (1963–1965)
1963–64	Joseph Lapchick	14–11	–	–	
1964–65	Joseph Lapchick	21–8	–	–	NIT Champion
Joseph Lapchick:		334–130			
Lou Carnesecca (Independent) (1965–1970)
1965–66	Lou Carnesecca	18–8	–	–	NIT First Round
1966–67	Lou Carnesecca	23–5	–	–	NCAA University Division Sweet Sixteen
1967–68	Lou Carnesecca	19–8	–	–	NCAA University Division First Round
1968–69	Lou Carnesecca	23–6	–	–	NCAA University Division Sweet Sixteen
1969–70	Lou Carnesecca	21–8	–	–	NIT Runner-up
Lou Carnesecca:		160–62			
Frank Mulzoff (Independent) (1970–1973)
1970–71	Frank Mulzoff	18–9	–	–	NIT First Round
1971–72	Frank Mulzoff	19–11	–	–	NIT Fourth Place
1972–73	Frank Mulzoff	19–7	–	–	NCAA University Division First Round
Frank Mulzoff:		56–27			
Lou Carnesecca (Independent) (1973–1979)
1973–74	Lou Carnesecca	20–7	–	–	NIT First Round
1974–75	Lou Carnesecca	21–10	^{[Note C]}	–	NIT Fourth Place
1975–76	Lou Carnesecca	23–6	^{[Note C]}	–	NCAA Division I First Round
1976–77	Lou Carnesecca	22–9	^{[Note C]}	–	NCAA Division I First Round
1977–78	Lou Carnesecca	21–7	^{[Note C]}	–	NCAA Division I First Round
1978–79	Lou Carnesecca	21–11	^{[Note C]}	–	NCAA Division I Elite Eight
Lou Carnesecca (Big East Conference (original)) (1979–1992)
1979–80	Lou Carnesecca	24–5	5–1	T–1st	NCAA Division I Second Round
1980–81	Lou Carnesecca	17–11	8–6	3rd	NIT First Round
1981–82	Lou Carnesecca	21–9	9–5	3rd	NCAA Division I Second Round
1982–83	Lou Carnesecca	28–5	12–4	T–1st	NCAA Division I Sweet Sixteen
1983–84	Lou Carnesecca	18–12	8–8	5th	NCAA Division I First Round
1984–85	Lou Carnesecca	31–4	15–1	1st	NCAA Division I Final Four
1985–86	Lou Carnesecca	31–5	14–2	T–1st	NCAA Division I Second Round
1986–87	Lou Carnesecca	21–9	10–6	T–4th	NCAA Division I Second Round
1987–88	Lou Carnesecca	17–12	8–8	T–5th	NCAA Division I First Round
1988–89	Lou Carnesecca	20–13	6–10	8th	NIT Champion
1989–90	Lou Carnesecca	24–10	10–6	4th	NCAA Division I Second Round
1990–91	Lou Carnesecca	23–9	10–6	2nd	NCAA Division I Elite Eight
1991–92	Lou Carnesecca	19–11	12–6	T–1st	NCAA Division I First Round
Lou Carnesecca:		526–200	294–115		
Brian Mahoney (Big East Conference (original)) (1992–1996)
1992–93	Brian Mahoney	19–11	12–6	2nd	NCAA Division I Second Round
1993–94	Brian Mahoney	12–17	5–13	9th	
1994–95	Brian Mahoney	14–14	7–11	8th	NIT First Round
1995–96	Brian Mahoney	11–16	5–13	5th (BE6)	
Brian Mahoney:		56–58	29–43		
Fran Fraschilla (Big East Conference (original)) (1996–1998)
1996–97	Fran Fraschilla	13–14	8–10	5th (BE6)	
1997–98	Fran Fraschilla	22–10	13–5	2nd (BE6)	NCAA Division I First Round
Fran Fraschilla:		35–24	21–15		
Mike Jarvis (Big East Conference (original)) (1998–2004)
1998–99	Mike Jarvis	28–9	14–4	3rd	NCAA Division I Elite Eight
1999-00	Mike Jarvis	25–8	12–4	3rd	NCAA Division I Second Round
2000–01	Mike Jarvis	14–15^{[Note D]}	8–8	3rd (East)	
2001–02	Mike Jarvis	20–12^{[Note D]}	9–7	3rd (East)	NCAA Division I First Round
2002–03	Mike Jarvis	21–13^{[Note D]}	7–9	5th (East)	NIT Champion
2003–04	Mike Jarvis; Kevin Clark^{[Note E]}	6–21^{[Note D]}	1–15	14th	
Mike Jarvis:		114–78^{[Note F]}	51–47		
Norm Roberts (Big East Conference (original)) (2004–2010)
2004–05	Norm Roberts	9–18	3–13	12th	
2005–06	Norm Roberts	12–15	5–11	15th	
2006–07	Norm Roberts	16–15	7–9	11th	
2007–08	Norm Roberts	11–19	5–13	14th	
2008–09	Norm Roberts	16–18	6–12	13th	CBI First Round
2009–10	Norm Roberts	17–16	6–12	13th	NIT First Round
Norm Roberts:		81–101	32–70		
Steve Lavin (Big East Conference (original)) (2010–2013)
2010–11	Steve Lavin	21–12	12–6	T–3rd	NCAA Division I First Round
2011–12	Steve Lavin; Mike Dunlap	13–19^{[Note G]}	6–12	T–11th	
2012–13	Steve Lavin	17–16	8–10	10th	NIT Second Round
Steve Lavin (Big East Conference) (2013–2015)
2013–14	Steve Lavin	20–13	10–8	T–3rd	NIT First Round
2014–15	Steve Lavin	21–12	10–8	5th	NCAA Division I First Round
Steve Lavin:		92–72	46–44		
Chris Mullin (Big East Conference) (2015–2019)
2015–16	Chris Mullin	8–24	1–17	10th	
2016–17	Chris Mullin	14–19	7–11	8th	
2017–18	Chris Mullin	16–17	4–14	T–9th	
2018–19	Chris Mullin	21–13	8–10	7th	NCAA Division I First Four
Chris Mullin:		59–73	20–52		
Mike Anderson (Big East Conference) (2019–2023)
2019–20	Mike Anderson	17–15	5–13	T–8th	No postseason held
2020–21	Mike Anderson	16–11	10–9	T–4th	
2021–22	Mike Anderson	17–15	8–11	T–7th	
2022–23	Mike Anderson	18–15	7–13	8th	
Mike Anderson:		68–56	30–46		
Rick Pitino (Big East Conference) (2023–present)
2023–24	Rick Pitino	20–13	11–9	5th	Declined NIT bid
2024–25	Rick Pitino	30–4	18–2	1st	NCAA Division I Second Round
2025–26	Rick Pitino	30–7	18–2	1st	NCAA Division I Sweet Sixteen
Rick Pitino:		80–24	47–13		
Total:		2,002–1,105			
National champion Postseason invitational champion Conference regular season champion Conference regular season and conference tournament champion Division regular season champion Division regular season and conference tournament champion Conference tournament champion

== Notes ==
^A.The Helms Athletic Foundation retrospectively selected St. John's as its national champion for the 1910–11 season in 1957.
^C.Although an independent at the time, St. John's participated from 1975 to 1979 in the end-of-season ECAC tournaments organized by the Eastern College Athletic Conference (a loosely organized sports federation of Eastern colleges and universities) for ECAC members which otherwise had no access to an automatic bid to the NCAA Division I tournament. Each of these regional tournaments gave its winner an automatic bid to that year's NCAA tournament in the same manner as conference tournaments of conventional conferences. St. John's played in the ECAC Metro Region Tournament in each of these five seasons, winning it in 1977 and 1978.
^D.St. John's vacated 47 games (46 wins and one loss) from 2000 to 2004 after Abe Keita was ruled ineligible. Official records are 5–15 for 2000–01, 7–11 for 2001–02, 1–13 for 2002–03 and 0–4 for 2003–04.
^EJarvis was fired on December 19, 2003 after beginning the season 2–4; assistant Kevin Clark finished the season, going 4–17 at the helm.
^F. Official record at St. John's is 68–77 (53–32 Big East) not counting vacated games.
^G.Lavin coached the first four games of the season, going 2–2. Dunlap went 11–17 over the remainder of the year.
