= 1944–45 St. John's Redmen basketball team =

American college basketball season

1944–45 St. John's Redmen men's basketball

NIT Third Place

NIT Semifinal vs. Bowling Green, L, 44-57
- Conference: Metropolitan New York Conference
- Record: 21–3 ( Metropolitan New York Conference)
- Head coach: Joseph Lapchick
- Captain: Hy Gotkin
- Home arena: DeGray Gymnasium; Madison Square Garden

The 1944–45 St. John's Redmen basketball team represented St. John's College of Brooklyn during the 1944–45 NCAA Division I college basketball season. The team was coached by Joseph Lapchick in his ninth year at the school. St. John's home games were played at DeGray Gymnasium in Brooklyn and the old Madison Square Garden in Manhattan.

== Roster ==
#	Name	Height	Position	Class	Hometown	Previous School(s)
	Ray Wertis	5"11"	G	Jr.	Far Rockaway, NY, U.S.	Far Rockaway HS
	Bill Kotsores	6'2"	F	Sr.	Long Island City, NY, U.S.	Andrew Jackson HS
	Ivy Summer	6'5"	C	So.	Brooklyn, NY, U.S.	James Madison HS
12	Hy Gotkin (C)	5'8"	G	Sr.	Brooklyn, NY, U.S.	Thomas Jefferson HS
	Tom Larkin	6'3"	F	Jr.	Cambria Heights, NY, U.S.	Andrew Jackson HS/Seton Hall
	Frank Pare	5'11"	G	So.	Jamaica, NY, U.S.	St. Ann's Academy
	Ken Pressman	6'2"	G	So.	Brooklyn, NY, U.S.	New Utrecht HS
	Vincent Hurley	6'0"	G	Jr.	Brooklyn, NY, U.S.	St. Augustine HS
	Murray Robinson	6'0"	G	Jr.	Brooklyn, NY, U.S.	Lafayette HS

== Schedule and results ==
Date time, TV	Rank^{#}	Opponent^{#}	Result	Record	Site city, state
Regular Season
12/02/44*		Alumni	W 47-30	1-0	DeGray Gymnasium; Brooklyn, NY
12/05/44*		Montclair State	W 49-23	2-0	DeGray Gymnasium; Brooklyn, NY
12/08/44*		Camp Shanks	W 53-36	3-0	DeGray Gymnasium; Brooklyn, NY
12/13/44*		Utah	W 39-36	4-0	Madison Square Garden; New York, NY
12/19/44*		West Point Field Artillery	W 53-45	5-0	DeGray Gymnasium; Brooklyn, NY
12/23/44*		Puerto Rico	W 41-35	6-0	Madison Square Garden; New York, NY
12/30/44*		Dartmouth	W 53-38	7-0	Madison Square Garden; New York, NY
01/03/45		vs. CCNY	L 41-42	7-1	Madison Square Garden; New York, NY
01/06/45*		Rhode Island State	W 66-58	8-1	Madison Square Garden; New York, NY
01/13/45*		at Temple	W 43-41 ^{OT}	9-1	Convention Hall; Philadelphia, PA
01/16/45*		Akron	W 48-42	10-1	Madison Square Garden; New York, NY
01/20/45*		vs. Syracuse	W 58-35	11-1	Buffalo Memorial Auditorium; Buffalo, NY
01/31/45		Fordham	W 71-35	12-1	DeGray Gymnasium; Brooklyn, NY
02/03/45*		at St. Joseph's	W 52-36	13-1	Convention Hall; Philadelphia, PA
02/09/45*		Rider	W 48-39	14-1	DeGray Gymnasium; Brooklyn, NY
02/14/45*		at Army	L 39-56	14-2	USMA Fieldhouse; West Point, NY
02/17/45		at Brooklyn	W 63-27	15-2	N/A; Brooklyn, NY
02/21/45		vs. NYU	W 39-30	16-2	Madison Square Garden; New York, NY
03/01/45*		Cathedral	W 58-34	17-2	DeGray Gymnasium; Brooklyn, NY
03/03/45*		Ellis Island Coast Guard	W 51-46	18-2	DeGray Gymnasium; Brooklyn, NY
03/07/45		vs. St. Francis (NY)	W 69-35	19-2	Madison Square Garden; New York, NY
NIT
03/19/45*		vs. Muhlenberg; NIT Quarterfinal	W 34-33	20-2	Madison Square Garden; New York, NY
03/21/45*		vs. Bowling Green; NIT Semifinal	L 44-57	20-3	Madison Square Garden; New York, NY
03/26/45*		vs. Rhode Island State; NIT third-place game	W 64-57	21-3	Madison Square Garden; New York, NY
*Non-conference game. ^{#}Rankings from AP Poll. (#) Tournament seedings in parentheses.
