= 1943–44 St. John's Redmen basketball team =

American college basketball season

1943–44 St. John's Redmen men's basketball

NIT Champions

NIT Championship vs. DePaul, W, 47-39
- Conference: Metropolitan New York Conference
- Record: 18–5 ( Metropolitan New York Conference)
- Head coach: Joseph Lapchick
- Captain: Hy Gotkin
- Home arena: DeGray Gymnasium; Madison Square Garden

The 1943–44 St. John's Redmen basketball team represented St. John's College of Brooklyn during the 1943–44 NCAA Division I college basketball season. The team was coached by Joseph Lapchick in his eighth year at the school. St. John's home games were played at DeGray Gymnasium in Brooklyn and the old Madison Square Garden in Manhattan.

== Roster ==
#	Name	Height	Position	Class	Hometown	Previous School(s)
3	Bill Kotsores	6'2"	F	Jr.	Long Island City, NY, U.S.	Andrew Jackson HS
4	Ray Wertis	5"11"	G	So.	Far Rockaway, NY, U.S.	Far Rockaway HS
5	Don Wehr	6'2"	G	Fr.	Brooklyn, NY, U.S.	Alexander Hamilton HS
6	Dick McGuire	6'0"	G	Fr.	Bronx, NY, U.S.	La Salle Academy
11	Ivy Summer	6'5"	C	Fr.	Brooklyn, NY, U.S.	James Madison HS
12	Hy Gotkin (C)	5'8"	G	Jr.	Brooklyn, NY, U.S.	Thomas Jefferson HS
14	Wade Duym	6'2"	F	Fr.	Cliffside Park, NJ, U.S.	
	Tom Larkin	6'3"	F	So.	Cambria Heights, NY, U.S.	Andrew Jackson HS/Seton Hall
	Vincent Hurley	6'0"	G	So.	Brooklyn, NY, U.S.	St. Augustine HS
	Murray Robinson	6'0"	G	So.	Brooklyn, NY, U.S.	Lafayette HS
10	Anthony Agoglia	6'2"	R	Fr.	Brooklyn, NY, U.S.	Manual Training HS

== Schedule and results ==
Date time, TV	Rank^{#}	Opponent^{#}	Result	Record	Site city, state
Regular Season
12/03/43*		Alumni	W 57-32	1-0	DeGray Gymnasium; Brooklyn, NY
12/09/43*		West Point Field Artillery	W 69-47	2-0	DeGray Gymnasium; Brooklyn, NY
12/15/43*		Montclair State	W 57-34	3-0	DeGray Gymnasium; Brooklyn, NY
12/18/43*		Detroit	W 44-31	4-0	Madison Square Garden; New York, NY
12/22/43*		Webb Institute	W 80-32	5-0	DeGray Gymnasium; Brooklyn, NY
12/30/43*		Kentucky	L 38-44	5-1	Madison Square Garden; New York, NY
01/05/44		vs. CCNY	W 45-38	6-1	Madison Square Garden; New York, NY
01/08/44*		Rhode Island State	W 58-48	7-1	Madison Square Garden; New York, NY
01/15/44*		at Temple	W 36-32	8-1	Convention Hall; Philadelphia, PA
01/19/44*		at Army	L 36-49	8-2	USMA Fieldhouse; West Point, NY
01/29/44*		Cathedral	W 68-43	9-2	DeGray Gymnasium; Brooklyn, NY
02/02/44		St. Francis (NY)	W 60-55	10-2	DeGray Gymnasium; Brooklyn, NY
02/05/44		Brooklyn Army Base	W 59-50 ^{OT}	11-2	DeGray Gymnasium; Brooklyn, NY
02/12/44*		at St. Joseph's	W 41-36	12-2	Convention Hall; Philadelphia, PA
02/17/44*		Temple	L 44-47	12-3	Madison Square Garden; New York, NY
02/19/44*		at Canisius	L 43-48 ^{2OT}	12-4	Buffalo Memorial Auditorium; Buffalo, NY
02/23/44		vs. NYU	W 50-40	13-4	Madison Square Garden; New York, NY
03/03/44*		Yeshiva	W 61-36	14-4	DeGray Gymnasium; Brooklyn, NY
03/08/44		vs. Brooklyn	W 55-42	15-4	Madison Square Garden; New York, NY
NIT
03/16/44*		vs. Bowling Green; NIT Quarterfinal	W 44-40	16-4	Madison Square Garden; New York, NY
03/22/44*		vs. Kentucky; NIT Semifinal	W 48-45	17-4	Madison Square Garden; New York, NY
03/24/44*		vs. DePaul; NIT Championship	W 47-39	18-4	Madison Square Garden; New York, NY
Red Cross Benefit Game
03/30/44*		vs. Utah; Red Cross Benefit Game	L 36-44	18-5	Madison Square Garden; New York, NY
*Non-conference game. ^{#}Rankings from AP Poll. (#) Tournament seedings in parentheses.
