= Dusty DeStefano =

American basketball and baseball coach (1917–1982)

Biographical details
- Born: 1917
- Died: September 22, 1982 (aged 64); New York, New York, U.S.

Playing career

Basketball
- 1938–1940: St. John's

Baseball
- 1938–1940: St. John's

Coaching career (HC unless noted)

Basketball
- 1947–1952: St. John's (assistant)
- 1952–1956: St. John's

Baseball
- 1948–1952: St. John's (assistant)
- 1953–1955: St. John's

Head coaching record
- Overall: 49–38 (.563) (basketball); 39–15–1 (.722) (baseball)
- Tournaments: 3–1 (NIT); 1–1 (NCAA baseball)

Alfred F. "Dusty" DeStefano (1917–1982) was an American basketball and baseball coach who was the head men's basketball and baseball coach at St. John's University.

== Biography ==
DeStefano played for the St. John's men's basketball team from 1938 to 1940. He was a reserve player known for his defense and agility. He was also a member of the St. John's baseball team during the same time.

In 1947, DeStefano became assistant basketball coach at St. John's after the school's administration rejected head coach Frank McGuire's first choice, Buck Freeman. DeStefano was promoted to head coach in 1952 after McGuire took the head coaching job at North Carolina. DeStafano compiled a 49–38 record over four seasons and led St. John's to finals of the 1953 National Invitation Tournament. From 1953 to 1955, he was also St. John's head baseball coach. His teams had a 39–15–1 record and made an appearance in the 1954 NCAA baseball tournament. He announced his resignation on February 2, 1956 to enter private business.

On September 22, 1982, DeStefano suffered a heart attack at Yankee Stadium before a game between the New York Yankees and Cleveland Indians. He was treated by Yankee trainers Gene Monahan and Mark Letendre rushed to Lincoln Hospital. He died in the hospital's intensive care unit.
