= Marcus Gaither =

American-French basketball player (1961–2020)

Personal information
- Born: April 26, 1961 Queens, New York, U.S.
- Died: July 16, 2020 (aged 59)
- Listed height: 6 ft 5 in (1.96 m)
- Listed weight: 190 lb (86 kg)

Career information
- High school: Far Rockaway (Queens, New York)
- College: Fairleigh Dickinson (1980–1984)
- NBA draft: 1984: 5th round, 108th overall pick
- Drafted by: Utah Jazz
- Position: Shooting guard

Career history
- 1984–1985: Puerto Rico Coquis
- 1985: Maine Windjammers
- 1987–1988: Birmingham Bullets
- 1989–1990: Maccabi Kiryat Motzkin
- 1990–1994: AS Chatou
- 1995–1997: Levallois
- 1997–1998: SIG Strasbourg
- 1998: Montpellier
- 1998–1999: B. Sardegna Sassari

Career highlights
- Israeli League Top Scorer (1990)
- Stats at Basketball Reference

Marcus Gaither (April 26, 1961 – July 16, 2020) was an American-French professional basketball player, who played the guard position. In 1989–90 Gaither led the Israel Basketball Premier League in scoring. He then played in France for 11 years, and he ended his career playing for one season in the Italian Lega Basket Serie A.

== Personal life ==
Gaither was born in Far Rockaway, Queens, and attended Far Rockaway High School. He was 6 feet 5 inches (1.96 m) tall and weighed 190 pounds (86 kg).

In 2008, Gaither was living in West Caldwell, New Jersey, operating a mortgage company, and officiating at AAU basketball tournaments. He earned an MBA in Information Technology Management from Jones International University in 2010. In 2014, he joined the mortgage lending team at the corporate office of The Money Store in Florham Park, New Jersey.

Gaither died in July 2020 at 59 years of age.

== Basketball career ==
Gaither attended and played basketball for Fairleigh Dickinson University, graduating in 1984 with a B.S. in Business Management. He played for the Fairleigh Dickinson Knights in the Northeast Conference from 1980 to 1984. He led the team in scoring from 1981 to 1984, and had a career-high 22.9 points per game in the 1982–83 season. He was named to the 1982 ECAC Metro South All-Star basketball team. In 1983 he led the league in scoring, with 22.9 points per game. He set a school record as FDU's all-time leading scorer with 1,815 points, a mark which stood for seven years. In 2016, Gaither ranked second all-time in points, and in 1999 he was third with 369 career assists, and was fifth with 465 field goals made.

Gaither was drafted by the Utah Jazz in the fifth round of the 1984 NBA draft. He played parts of his first two professional seasons in the Continental Basketball Association (CBA) for the Puerto Rico Coquis and Maine Windjammers, averaging 7.6 points over 17 games.

Gaither played for the Birmingham Bullets of the British Basketball League in England in the 1987–88 season, averaging 35.3 points and 3.5 assists per game, and was named to the BBL Team of the Year.

In 1989–90 Gaither played in Israel for Maccabi Kiryat Motzkin, leading the Israel Basketball Premier League in scoring with a 28.6 points per game average.

Gaither played in France for 11 years. He played for French basketball team AS Chatou (now Poissy Basket) from 1991 to 1994, averaging 27.1 points, 3.3 rebounds, 5.1 assists, and 2.6 steals per game. He then played for Levallois from 1995 to 1997 and SIG Strasbourg from 1997 to 1998 in LNB Pro A, and Montpellier (1998–99).

He ended his career playing for B. Sardegna Sassari in Sardinia in the Italian Lega Basket Serie A in 1998–99.

== Honors ==
Gaither was inducted into Fairleigh Dickinson University's Division I Athletics Hall of Fame in 1999.
