= Marcus Hatten =

American basketball player

Personal information
- Born: December 13, 1980 (age 44) Baltimore, Maryland, U.S.
- Listed height: 6 ft 1 in (1.85 m)

Career information
- High school: Mergenthaler Vocational-Technical (Baltimore, Maryland)
- College: Tallahassee CC (1999–2001); St. John's (2001–2003)
- NBA draft: 2003: undrafted
- Playing career: 2003–2018
- Position: Point guard

Career history
- 2003: Stal Ostrów Wielkopolski
- 2003–2004: La Palma
- 2004–2005: A.S. Ramat HaSharon
- 2005: Guaros de Lara
- 2005–2006: Hapoel Tel Aviv
- 2006–2007: Ironi Ashkelon
- 2007–2008: Scafati
- 2008–2009: Brindisi
- 2009–2010: Assigeco Casalpusterlengo
- 2011: Mons-Hainaut
- 2011–2013: Kolossos Rodou
- 2013–2014: Mitteldeutscher
- 2014–2015: Oradea
- 2015–2018: Mitteldeutscher

Career highlights
- ProA champion (2017); Israeli League Top Scorer (2006); Haggerty Award (2002)

Marcus Isaiah Hatten (born December 13, 1980) is an American former professional basketball player. Standing at 6 ft 1 in (1.85 m), he played as point guard and had an extensive professional career in several European and South-American countries. He was the 2006 top scorer in the Israel Basketball Premier League

== Early career ==
Hatten attended Mergenthaler Vocational Technical Senior High School. From there he went to Tallahassee Community College where he averaged about 20 points per game between his freshman and sophomore seasons.

After this, he transferred to Big East power, St. John's University in New York City to be a communications major. He was the second Tallahassee Community College star to go to St. John's, as Bootsy Thornton (also of Baltimore) took the same route to St. John's. Under coach Mike Jarvis, he was an NIT champion and MVP, two time All–Big East first team selection and averaged 21.2 points per game. Though his MVP and St. John' NIT title were later vacated due to St. John's use of illegible players.

== Professional career ==
He was not drafted in the 2003 NBA draft and played in the CBA before a brief stint with the Los Angeles Clippers. Then he played in Poland and Spain before being signed by the Denver Nuggets.

However, he went to play in Israel. In the 2005–06 season, he averaged 22.7 points per game playing with Hapoel Tel Aviv, during that same year Hatten was accused during the end of the season of sexual abuse by a local 19 year old woman alongside Hapoel Jerusalem's Horace Jenkins, Roger Mason Jr. and Mario Austin, the accusation dropped later that year. In the following season he played at Elitzur Ashkelon. He led the Israeli League in scoring per game with 23.23 points and also scored the most points in one game in that season with 49 against Hapoel Jerusalem.

In the 2007–08 season, he arrived in Italy and he played in Scafati Basket. At the beginning of the 2009–10 season, a new contract was inked for U.C.C. Casalpusterlengo, an Italian Legadue team. Then he went to Dexia Mons-Hainaut.

On July 27, 2015, he signed with BG Göttingen. His contract was terminated two weeks later when he failed a physical as a result of a knee injury.

On November 6, 2015, he returned to Mitteldeutscher BC, signing a two-year deal.

=== The Basketball Tournament (TBT) ===
In the summer of 2017, Hatten competed in The Basketball Tournament on ESPN for the number one seeded FCM Untouchables. Competing for the $2 million grand prize, Hatten led the Untouchables in scoring with 20.0 points per game on 52% shooting from the three-point line. His 16 made three-pointers ranked fourth among all competing players. The Untouchables advanced to the Super 16 Round where they were defeated 85–71 by Team FOE, a Philadelphia-based team coached by NBA forwards Markieff and Marcus Morris.
