= Mel Utley =

American basketball player (1953–2019)

Personal information
- Born: January 2, 1953 Queens, New York, U.S.
- Died: September 24, 2019 (aged 66)
- Listed height: 6 ft 3 in (1.91 m)
- Listed weight: 175 lb (79 kg)

Career information
- High school: Far Rockaway (Queens, New York)
- College: St. John's (1972–1975)
- NBA draft: 1975: 2nd round, 33rd overall pick
- Drafted by: Cleveland Cavaliers
- Playing career: 1975–1979
- Position: Point guard

Career history
- 1975–1976: Long Island Sounds
- 1977–1978: Long Island Ducks
- 1978–1979: Shore Bullets
- Stats at Basketball Reference

Melvin Utley (January 2, 1953 – September 24, 2019) was an American professional basketball player. He emerged as a star while playing at Far Rockaway High School in his hometown of Queens, New York, and earned all-city honors during his senior year in 1971. Utley played collegiately for the St. John's Redmen, whom he desired to play for due to the closeness of his family. In his three years with the Redmen, Utley led the team in scoring twice and was named team co-captain during his senior season. His 345 assists rank as the second-highest in program history by a three-year player.

Utley was selected by the Cleveland Cavaliers in the 1975 NBA draft as the 33rd overall pick, which was the selection before his hometown New York Knicks. He was the last player cut by the Cavaliers before the start of the 1975–76 NBA season. Utley wished to tryout for the Knicks but the Cavaliers refused to release his draft rights and he ultimately never played a game in the National Basketball Association (NBA). Instead, he played professionally in the Eastern Basketball Association (EBA) for the Long Island Sounds, Long Island Ducks and the Shore Bullets.

Utley had an early retirement from playing basketball professionally at the urging of his mother, who insisted on him pursuing a different career as he was not making enough money. He ran a group home for 14 years that dealt with children in the court system and also worked as a substitute teacher in Brooklyn, New York.
