= Hy Gotkin =

American basketball player

Personal information
- Born: August 16, 1922 Brooklyn, New York, U.S.
- Died: April 11, 2004 (aged 81) Delray Beach, Florida, U.S.
- Listed height: 5 ft 8 in (1.73 m)

Career information
- High school: Thomas Jefferson (Brooklyn, New York)
- College: St. John's (1942–1944 )
- Playing career: 1942–1944
- Position: Guard

Career history
- 1945–1946: New York Gothams
- 1946–1947: Elizabeth Braves

Career highlights
- Third-team All-American – Argosy, SN (1945)

Hyman "Hy" Gotkin (August 16, 1922 – April 11, 2004) was an American professional basketball player who played the guard position. He was Jewish, and attended Thomas Jefferson High School in Brooklyn. He played basketball for St. John's University from 1942–44, as they won the National Invitational Tournament (NIT) championships in 1943 and 1944. He had a four-year professional career, playing in the American Basketball League.

Gotkin died in 2004 at the age of 81. He is a member of the New York City Basketball Hall of Fame and the National Jewish Sports Hall of Fame
