= National Invitation Tournament =

Collegiate basketball tournament

- Current season, competition or edition: 2026 National Invitation Tournament
- Sport: College basketball
- Founded: 1938
- Founder: Metropolitan Basketball Writers Association
- First season: 1938
- Motto: College Basketball's Beginning
- No. of teams: 32
- Country: United States
- Most recent champion: Auburn (1st title)
- Most titles: St. John's (5)
- Broadcasters: ESPN; ESPN2; ESPNU
- Streaming partner: ESPN+
- Related competitions: NIT Season Tip-Off; NCAA Division I men's basketball tournament College Basketball Crown; College Basketball Invitational; CollegeInsider.com Postseason Tournament
- Website: National Invitation Tournament - NIT Basketball Championship

The National Invitation Tournament (NIT) is an annual men's college basketball tournament operated by the National Collegiate Athletic Association (NCAA). Since 2023, all rounds of the tournament are played at various sites across the country which are selected annually. From its founding in 1938 to 2022, the semifinals and finals were always played at Madison Square Garden (MSG) in New York City. Predating the NCAA Division I men's basketball tournament by one year, the NIT was considered the most prestigious post-season showcase for college basketball before its status was superseded in the mid-1950s by the NCAA tournament.

A second, much more recent "NIT" tournament is played in November and known as the NIT Season Tip-Off. Formerly the "Preseason NIT" (and still sometimes referred to as such colloquially), it was founded in 1985. Unlike the postseason NIT, its final rounds are played at Madison Square Garden. Both tournaments were operated by the Metropolitan Intercollegiate Basketball Association (MIBA) until 2005, when they were purchased by the NCAA, and the MIBA disbanded.

Unless otherwise qualified, the terms National Invitation Tournament or NIT refer to the post-season tournament in both common and official use.

== History ==
=== Founding ===
The post-season National Invitation Tournament was founded in 1938 by the Metropolitan Basketball Writers Association, one year after the NAIA tournament was created by basketball's inventor Dr. James Naismith, and one year before the NCAA tournament. The first NIT was won by the Temple University Owls over the Colorado Buffaloes.

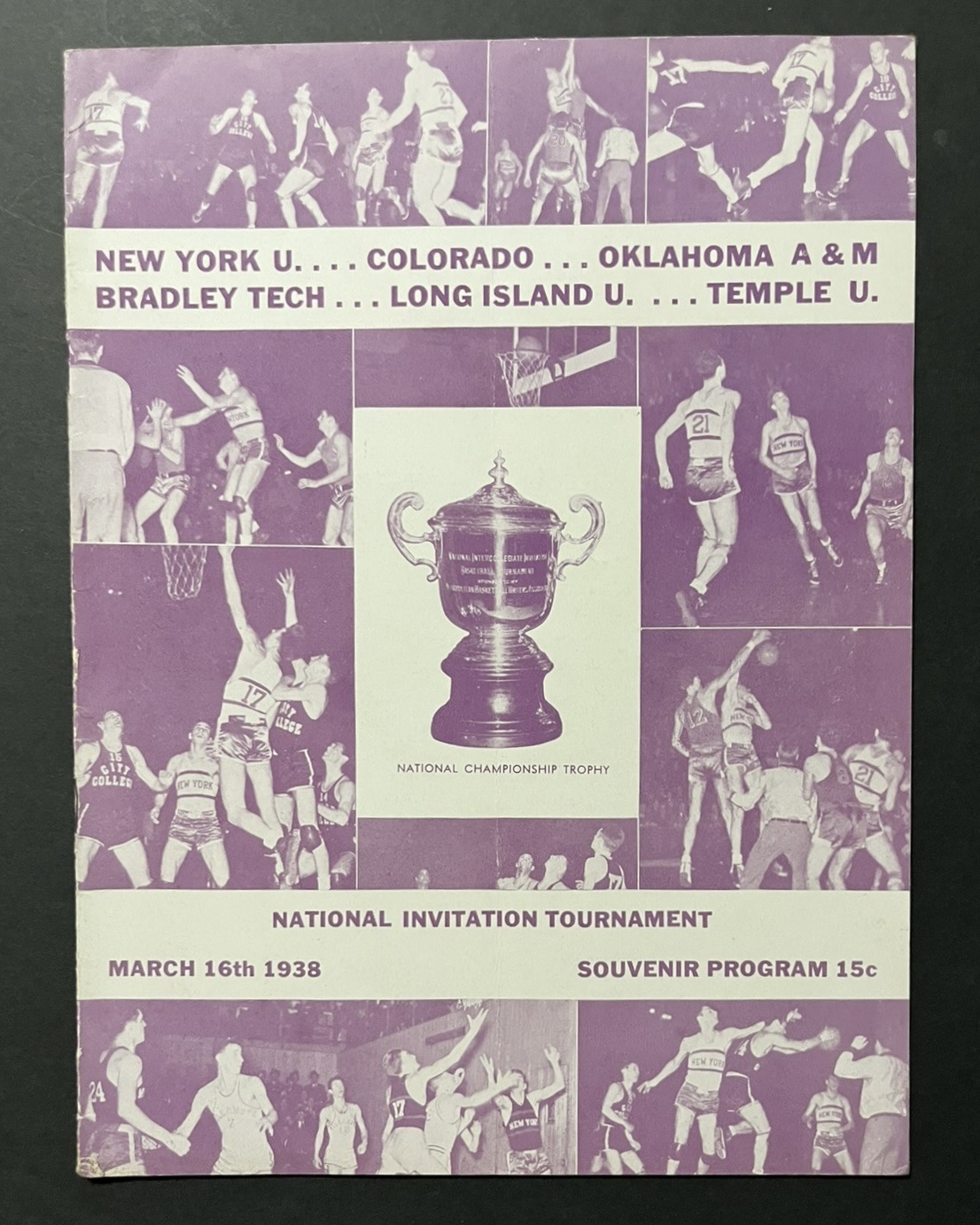
Souvenir program from the inaugural NIT showcasing the "National Championship Trophy" won by Temple in 1938.

Responsibility for the NIT's administration was transferred in 1940 to the Metropolitan Intercollegiate Basketball Committee, a body of local New York colleges: Fordham University, Manhattan University, New York University, St. John's University, and Wagner College. This became the Metropolitan Intercollegiate Basketball Association (MIBA) in 1948.

Originally the tournament invited a field of six teams, with all games played at Madison Square Garden in Manhattan.

The field was expanded to eight teams in 1941, 12 in 1949, 14 in 1965, 16 in 1968, 24 in 1979, 32 in 1980, and 40 from 2002 through 2006. From 2007 to 2019 and since 2022, the tournament reverted to the current 32-team format; 2021 saw the field cut to 16 due to the COVID-19 pandemic, where no games were scheduled the year before.

=== Early advantages over the NCAA tournament ===
In its earliest years, before 1950, the NIT offered some advantages over the NCAA tournament:

- There was limited national media coverage of college basketball in the 1930s and 1940s, and playing all of its games in New York City provided teams greater media exposure, both with the general public and among high school prospects in its rich recruiting territory. The NCAA also staged its eastern regional final in New York City from 1943 through 1950, as well as its Final Four from 1943 through 1948.
- Until 1950, the NCAA tournament selection committee invited only one team each from eight national regions, potentially leaving better quality selections and natural rivals out of its field, which would opt for the NIT.

=== Prestige ===
From its onset and at least into the mid-1950s, the NIT was regarded as the most prestigious showcase for college basketball.

John McPhee, the writer for The New Yorker, described the tournament:

In the 1940s, when the NCAA tournament was less than 10 years old, the National Invitation Tournament, a saturnalia held in New York at Madison Square Garden by the Metropolitan Intercollegiate Basketball Association, was the most glamorous of the post-season tournaments and generally had the better teams. The winner of the National Invitation Tournament was regarded as more of a national champion than the actual, titular, national champion, or winner of the NCAA tournament.

— A Sense of Where You Are: Bill Bradley at Princeton

Several teams played in both the NIT and NCAA tournaments in the same year, beginning with Colorado and Duquesne in 1940. Colorado won the NIT in 1940 but subsequently finished fourth in the NCAA West Region. In 1944, Utah lost its first game in the NIT but then proceeded to win not only the NCAA tournament, but also the subsequent Red Cross War Charities benefit game in which they defeated NIT champion St. John's at Madison Square Garden. In 1949, some Kentucky players were bribed by gamblers to lose their first round game in the NIT. This same Kentucky team went on to win the NCAA. In 1950, City College of New York won both the NIT and the NCAA tournaments in the same season, coincidentally defeating Bradley University in the championship game of both tournaments, and remains the only school to accomplish that feat because of an NCAA committee change in the early 1950s prohibiting a team from competing in both tournaments.

The champions of the NCAA and NIT tournaments played each other for three seasons during World War II. From 1943 to 1945, the American Red Cross sponsored a postseason charity game between each year's tournament champions to raise money for the war effort. The series was described by Ray Meyer as not just benefit games, but as "really the games for the national championship". The NCAA champion prevailed in all three games.

The Helms Athletic Foundation retrospectively selected the NIT champion as its national champion for 1938 (Temple) and chose the NIT champion over the NCAA champion once, in 1939 (Long Island). More recently, the mathematically based Premo-Porretta Power Poll published in the ESPN College Basketball Encyclopedia retrospectively ranked teams for each season prior to 1949, the year in which the Associated Press poll was implemented. For the period when the tournaments overlapped between 1939 and 1948, Premo-Porretta ranked the NIT champion ahead of the NCAA champion twice (1939 and 1941) and the NCAA champion ahead of the NIT champion eight times. Between 1939 and 1970, when teams could compete in either tournament, only DePaul (1945), Utah (1947), San Francisco (1949) and Holy Cross (1954) claim or celebrate national championships for their teams based solely on an NIT championship, although Long Island recognizes its selection as the 1939 national champion by Helms Athletic Foundation, which was made retrospectively in 1943.

In 1943 the NCAA tournament moved to share Madison Square Garden with the NIT in an effort to increase the credibility of the NCAA Tournament. In 1945, The New York Times indicated that many teams could get bids to enter either tournament, which was not uncommon in that day. Since the mid-1950s, the NCAA tournament has been popularly regarded by most institutions as the pre-eminent postseason tournament, with conference champions and the majority of the top-ranked teams participating in it.

Nevertheless, as late as 1970, Coach Al McGuire of Marquette, the 8th-ranked team in the final AP poll of the season, spurned an NCAA at-large invitation because the Warriors were going to be placed in the NCAA Midwest Regional (Fort Worth, Texas) instead of closer to home in the Mideast Regional (Dayton, Ohio). The team played in the NIT instead, which it won. This led the NCAA to decree in 1971 that any school to which it offered a bid must accept it or be prohibited from participating in postseason competition, reducing the pool of teams that could accept an NIT invitation.

=== Decline ===
As the NCAA tournament expanded its field to include more teams, the reputation of the NIT suffered. In 1973, NBC moved televised coverage of the NCAA championship from Saturday afternoon to Monday evening, providing the NCAA Tournament with prime-time television exposure the NIT could not match. Even more crucially, when the NCAA eliminated the one-team-per-conference rule in 1975, its requirement that teams accept its bids relegated the NIT to a collection of teams that did not make the NCAA grade.

Compounding this, to cut costs, the NIT moved its early rounds out of Madison Square Garden in 1977, playing games at home sites until the later rounds. This further harmed the NIT's prestige, both regionalizing interest in it and marginalizing it by reducing its association with Madison Square Garden. By the mid-1980s, its transition to a secondary tournament for lesser teams was complete.

=== NCAA takes control ===
In 2005, the National Collegiate Athletic Association purchased 10-year rights to the NIT from the MIBA for $56.5 million to settle an antitrust lawsuit, which had gone to trial and was being argued until very shortly before the settlement was announced. The MIBA alleged that compelling teams to accept invitations to the NCAA tournament even if they preferred to play in the NIT was an illegal use of the NCAA's powers. In addition, it argued that the NCAA's expansion of its tournament to 65 teams (68 since 2011) was designed specifically to bankrupt the NIT. Faced with the very real possibility of being found in violation of federal antitrust law for the third time in its history, the NCAA chose to settle. (The first two violations were related to restrictions on televising college football and capping assistant coach salaries). As part of the purchase of the NIT by the NCAA, the MIBA disbanded.

The 2020 edition of the NIT was canceled due to the COVID-19 pandemic, following the NCAA canceling all winter and spring sports for that year in its wake. In 2021, the NIT, like March Madness, decided to play its games at a bubble location, this time being Denton and Frisco, Texas, therefore for the first time the semifinals and championship were not played at Madison Square Garden. After a return to MSG in 2022, it was announced that the 2023 and 2024 semis and final would be moved away from New York. On August 12, 2022, the NCAA announced that the final rounds of the 2023 NIT would be held at Orleans Arena in Paradise, Nevada and hosted by nearby UNLV, and the 2024 site would be Butler University's Hinkle Fieldhouse in Indianapolis.

=== Reputation ===
The status of the post-season National Invitation Tournament as a "consolation" fixture has led to something of a stigma in the minds of many fans. When teams with tenuous hopes of an NCAA Tournament berth lose away from home late in the season, opposing fans may taunt the players in the closing seconds with chants of "NIT! NIT!" This is done regardless of whether the home team is headed for the NCAA Tournament or not. Irv Moss, a journalist for the Denver Post, once wrote of such a taunt to a defeated team, "The three-letter word ... was far more cutting than any four-letter word they could have hollered."

Because the post-season NIT consists of teams that failed to receive a berth in the NCAA Tournament, the NIT has been nicknamed the "Not Invited Tournament", "Not Important Tournament", "Never Important Tournament", "Nobody's Interested Tournament", "Needs Improvement Tournament", "No Important Team", "National Insignificant Tournament", or simply "Not In Tournament". It has also been called a tournament to see who the "69th best team" in the country is (since there are now 68 teams in the NCAA Tournament).

David Thompson, an All-American player from North Carolina State, called the NIT "a loser's tournament" in 1975. NC State, which had been the previous year's NCAA champion, refused to play in the tournament that year, following the precedent set by ACC rival Maryland the previous season after losing the Atlantic Coast Conference championship game to the top-ranked Wolfpack. In succeeding years, other teams such as Oklahoma State, Louisville, Georgia Tech, Georgetown, and LSU have declined to play in the NIT when they did not make the NCAA tournament. One such team was Maryland; after being rejected by the NCAA selection committee in 2006, head coach Gary Williams announced that 19–11 Maryland would not go to the NIT, only to be told that the university had previously agreed to use Comcast Center as a venue for the NIT. The Terrapins were eliminated in the first round by the Manhattan University Jaspers. In 2008, however, Williams announced that if invited, the Terps would play, because it would serve as a chance to further develop six freshman players on his squad and to give senior forward James Gist more exposure. At UCLA's Pauley Pavilion, there are individual championship banners for all 11 NCAA titles; there hung a banner for UCLA's 1985 NIT championship until the 1995 NCAA championship banner replaced it. However, during the recent remodeling of Pauley Pavilion a plaque was installed along the concourse of the building commemorating the Bruins' 1985 NIT Championship.

For other teams, however, the NIT is perceived as a step up, helping programs progress from mediocrity or obscurity to prominence, and the response is more enthusiastic. For example, at the University of Tulsa, which won the NIT in 1981 and 2001, the Golden Hurricane's NIT "championship tradition" is viewed with pride and as a "lure" for players to join the program. The University of Connecticut also regards the NIT as the beginning of its success. The NIT is also held in generally higher regard than the newer tournaments that have debuted since 2008 (the College Basketball Invitational, and CollegeInsider.com Postseason Tournament, plus The Basketball Classic and the Vegas 16, which both folded after only one edition), however some teams are opting for the more recent College Basketball Crown. St. Bonaventure, a school that, since 2014, has a policy of refusing to play in those newer tournaments, still accepted bids to the NIT, if invited. In 2024, St. Bonaventure declined an NIT invitation despite head coach Mark Schmidt indicating he wanted his team to play in the NIT. Five days later, athletic director Joe Manhertz resigned amidst controversy regarding the opt-out decision.

St. Bonaventure was not alone in declining an NIT bid, but only Memphis accompanied them as a non-power conference team. Most schools rejecting an invitation consisted of teams from major conferences, including two teams among the first four out in Oklahoma and Pitt.

The NIT Season Tip-Off carries none of the postseason tournament's stigma and is one of many popular season-opening tournaments held every year around the country (alongside events such as the Maui Invitational and the now-defunct Great Alaska Shootout).

== Selection process ==
In the past, NIT teams were selected in consultation with ESPN, the television home of the NIT. The goal of the NIT was to sustain the MIBA financially. Therefore, schools selected to play in the NIT were often major conference teams with records near .500 that had large television fan bases and would likely have a respectable attendance for tournament games on their home court. The latter is one reason why New Mexico was invited virtually every year—the Lobos often had a winning season but failed to qualify for the NCAA tournament. Seeding considerations and home court advantage included the number of fans willing to show up to each game. In an effort to maintain some quality, a rule saying that a team must have a .500 or better overall record to qualify for the NIT was imposed.

The NCAA announced a revamped selection process starting with the 2017 tournament. The main highlights are:

- Teams are no longer required to have .500 or greater overall records to receive bids.
- Similar to the automatic bids the NCAA tournament grants for all conference tournament champions, all teams that won regular-season conference championships but failed to earn NCAA tournament bids are guaranteed places in the NIT.

In addition, the selection process was changed. ESPN no longer had a hand in the selection of the teams. Instead, a committee of former NCAA head coaches, chaired by Newton, and including Gene Keady (Purdue), Don DeVoe (Tennessee), Rudy Davalos, Les Robinson (NC State), Reggie Minton (Air Force), John Powers, and Carroll Williams among others, prepared a list of potential teams in advance.

Beginning with the 2016 NIT, the committee makeup was restructured; committee members will serve a maximum four-year term, and the committee will feature a mix of current athletics administrators who are actively working at NCAA schools or conferences and former head college basketball coaches. Previously, the NIT Committee had eight members, all of whom had been former head college basketball coaches or athletics directors. The previous structure had no term limits or succession plan.

ESPN continues to provide television coverage of the tournament. In 2011 the NCAA and ESPN agreed to a $500 million agreement through 2023–24 for rights to cover championships in several sports, including the NIT; this compares with the 11-year, $6.2 billion TV contract with CBS and Turner Sports for the NCAA tournament.

These changes are intended to encourage participation by good college teams that would rather stay home than play in the NIT—to make it the "Little Dance" instead of the "loser's tournament". Former NIT Committee chair and former Alabama and Vanderbilt head coach C. M. Newton stated, "What we want to have is a true basketball event, a real tournament, one where there's no preconceived ideas of who gets to New York. We'd love to have great crowds, but this is not a financial consideration. We want good television coverage, but we're not going to play this thing for television and move games around". Another consideration is that a number one-seeded team that goes to the semifinals will have three home games, which helps ticket sales.

From 2007 to 2019, the 32-team field used from 1980 through 2001 is the same, eliminating the eight-game "play-in" opening round where teams played to qualify for second round games against the top eight seeds used 2002–2006. The tournament features four eight-team regions. There's one exception: 16 teams competed in 2021. For the first time since 2011, the format prevented the tournament from extending the NIT's automatic bid to any regular-season conference champion that did not make the NCAA's field of 76, as of 2027 (Ohio Valley Conference champion Belmont was not invited). Seven teams earned an NIT bid that way in 2006.

A new attendance record for an NIT game was set at Syracuse University's Carrier Dome on March 19, 2007, at the Syracuse–San Diego State game. Syracuse won the game 80–64 with an attendance total of 26,752. The previous record of 23,522 was set by Kentucky in 1979.

On October 27, 2023, the NCAA announced that conference regular season champions that do not win their conference tournaments and are not otherwise selected for the NCAA Division I men's basketball tournament would no longer receive an automatic bid. The NIT would now guarantee bids to two teams from each of six major conferences: ACC, Big East, Big Ten, Big 12, Pac-12 and SEC. Regardless of their record, the top two teams from each conference in the NET rankings that were not selected for the NCAA tournament would be invited to the NIT and guaranteed the option to host a first round game. After those twelve teams had been confirmed, the NIT selection committee would invite the twenty best available remaining teams, regardless of conference. Based on the selection committee's rankings, four of those twenty "at-large" teams would be selected to host the remaining first round games. The change received criticism from mid-major schools, which would no longer have a fallback option should they win their regular season title but lose their conference tournament. The NCAA called the changes "a preemptive attempt to keep the NIT viable long-term," citing competition from Fox Sports's College Basketball Crown, then a prospective NIT competitor.

Ahead of the 2025 NIT, the NCAA again revised the selection criteria, removing some guarantees from power conferences and reinstating some of the previous automatic bid system. For the 2025 NIT, exempt bids will be given to two teams from both the ACC and SEC, plus one team each from the top twelve conferences as rated by KenPom. Additionally, automatic bids will be given to regular-season conference champions with an average ranking of 125 or better across the BPI, KPI, NET, KenPom, SOR, Torvik and WAB rankings.

If the top two non-NCAA tournament teams from each of the Big 12, Big East and Big Ten are all committed to play in the CBC, and those three conferences all rank in the top 12 conferences (other than the ACC and SEC), the NIT would be unable to get a team better than the third best non-NCAA tournament team from each of those three leagues. Since the CBC has 10 at-large bids, it may extend some of those to ACC and SEC teams, which could further dilute the quality of teams participating in the NIT, if those teams accept a CBC bid.

== Women's tournaments ==
From 1969 to 1996, a National Women's Invitational Tournament (NWIT) existed; the tournament was resurrected under the same name in 1998, and has been known as the Women's National Invitation Tournament (WNIT) since 1999. The original NWIT was an eight-team tournament held in Amarillo, Texas throughout its history. The revived tournament began with 16 teams, expanded to 32 in its second season, and has since expanded further to 40, 48, and finally 64 teams from 2010 to 2023. However, the WNIT is affiliated with the NIT in name only. Neither the NWIT nor WNIT was connected with MIBA, and the WNIT was not purchased by the NCAA; it is currently being run and operated by Triple Crown Sports.

In July 2023, the NCAA announced it would create a direct counterpart to the postseason WNIT, the Women's Basketball Invitation Tournament (WBIT), with the first edition held in 2024. Like the men's NIT, it features 32 teams and is directly run by the NCAA. The WBIT follows the pre-2024 NIT practice of extending invitations to all regular-season champions of Division I conferences that were not selected for the NCAA tournament (if eligible). (Note: Southern Indiana, the regular-season and tournament champion of the Ohio Valley Conference in the WBIT's inaugural season, was not eligible for NCAA-sponsored postseason play due to being in the second year of its four-year transition from Division II.) Also, all games before the semifinals are at campus sites, with the semifinals and final at a neutral site. The announcement of the WBIT led Triple Crown Sports to reduce future WNIT fields to 48, effective with the 2024 edition.

== Men's postseason NIT champions ==
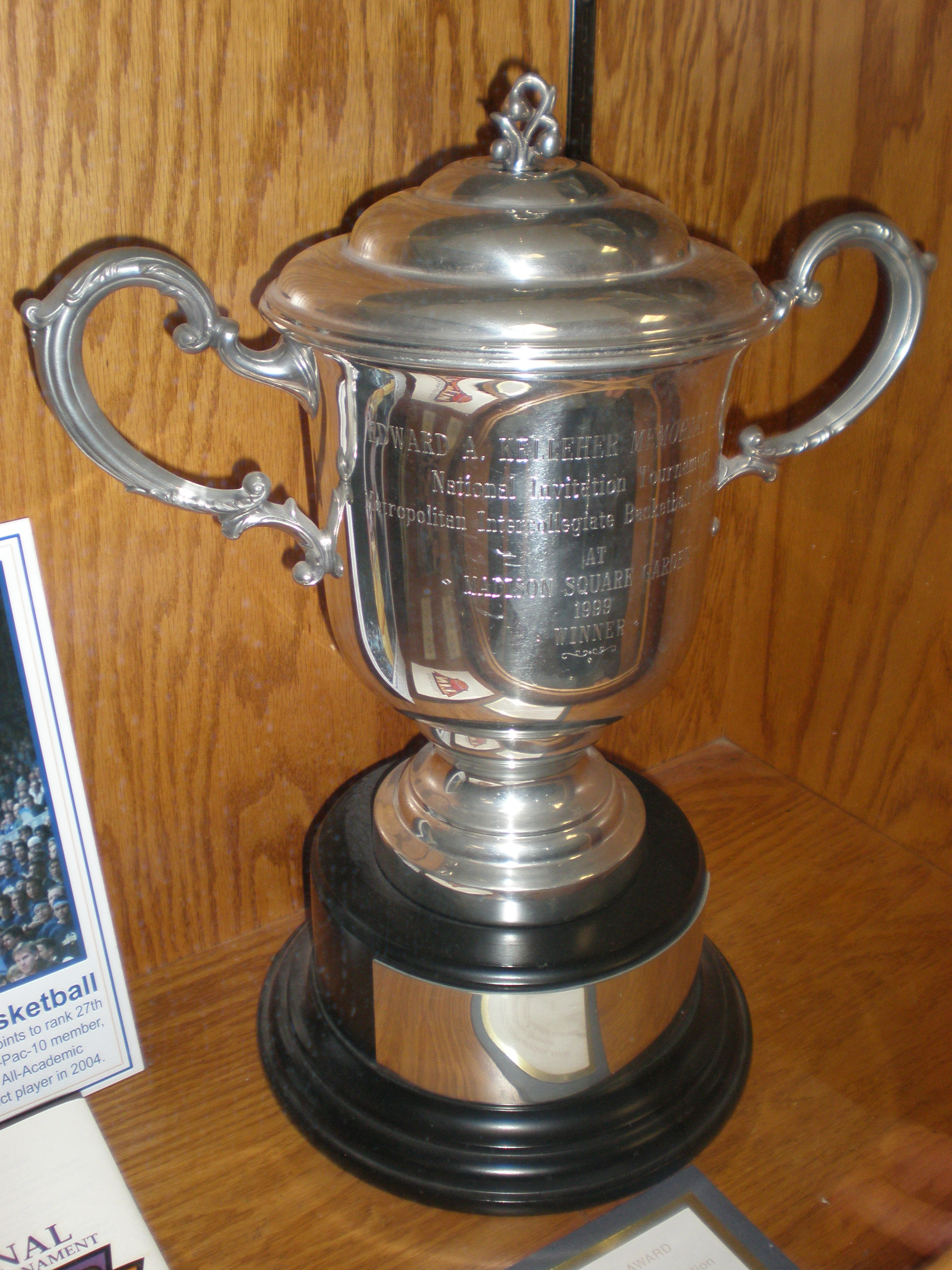
California's 1999 NIT trophy

Year	Champion	Runner-up	MVP
2026	Auburn	Tulsa	Kevin Overton, Auburn
2025	Chattanooga	UC Irvine	Trey Bonham, Chattanooga
2024	Seton Hall	Indiana State	Al-Amir Dawes, Seton Hall
2023	North Texas	UAB	Tylor Perry, North Texas
2022	Xavier	Texas A&M	Colby Jones, Xavier
2021	Memphis	Mississippi State	Landers Nolley II, Memphis
2020	No tournament due to the COVID-19 pandemic		
2019	Texas	Lipscomb	Kerwin Roach, Texas
2018	Penn State	Utah	Lamar Stevens, Penn State
2017	TCU	Georgia Tech	Kenrich Williams, TCU
2016	George Washington	Valparaiso	Tyler Cavanaugh, George Washington
2015	Stanford	Miami (FL)	Chasson Randle, Stanford
2014	Minnesota	SMU	Austin Hollins, Minnesota
2013	Baylor	Iowa	Pierre Jackson, Baylor
2012	Stanford	Minnesota	Aaron Bright, Stanford
2011	Wichita State	Alabama	Graham Hatch, Wichita State
2010	Dayton	North Carolina	Chris Johnson, Dayton
2009	Penn State	Baylor	Jamelle Cornley, Penn State
2008	Ohio State	Massachusetts	Kosta Koufos, Ohio State
2007	West Virginia	Clemson	Frank Young, West Virginia
2006	South Carolina	Michigan	Renaldo Balkman, South Carolina
2005	South Carolina	Saint Joseph's	Carlos Powell, South Carolina
2004	Michigan	Rutgers	Daniel Horton, Michigan
2003	Vacated (Note: St. John's won the 2003 NIT title, but later vacated the title due to an ineligible player.)	Georgetown	Vacated (Note: Marcus Hatten of St. John's was the MVP of the 2003 tournament, but vacated the award with St. John's title.)
2002	Memphis	South Carolina	Dajuan Wagner, Memphis
2001	Tulsa	Alabama	Marcus Hill, Tulsa
2000	Wake Forest	Notre Dame	Robert O'Kelley, Wake Forest
1999	California	Clemson	Sean Lampley, California
1998	Vacated (Note: Minnesota won the 1998 NIT title, but later vacated the title due to academic fraud.)	Penn State	Vacated (Note: Kevin Clark of Minnesota was the MVP of the 1998 tournament, but vacated the award with Minnesota's title.)
1997	Vacated (Note: Michigan won the 1997 NIT title, but later vacated the title and its entire 1996-97 schedule due to ineligible players.)	Florida State	Vacated (Note: Robert Traylor of Michigan was the MVP of the 1997 tournament, but was later declared ineligible and his award vacated.)
1996	Nebraska	Saint Joseph's	Erick Strickland, Nebraska
1995	Virginia Tech	Marquette	Shawn Smith, Virginia Tech
1994	Villanova	Vanderbilt	Doremus Bennerman, Siena
1993	Minnesota	Georgetown	Voshon Lenard, Minnesota
1992	Virginia	Notre Dame	Bryant Stith, Virginia
1991	Stanford	Oklahoma	Adam Keefe, Stanford
1990	Vanderbilt	Saint Louis	Scott Draud, Vanderbilt
1989	St. John's	Saint Louis	Jayson Williams, St. John's
1988	Connecticut	Ohio State	Phil Gamble, Connecticut
1987	Southern Miss	La Salle	Randolph Keys, Southern Miss
1986	Ohio State	Wyoming	Brad Sellers, Ohio State
1985	UCLA	Indiana	Reggie Miller, UCLA
1984	Michigan	Notre Dame	Tim McCormick, Michigan
1983	Fresno State	DePaul	Ron Anderson, Fresno State
1982	Bradley	Purdue	Mitchell Anderson, Bradley
1981	Tulsa	Syracuse	Greg Stewart, Tulsa
1980	Virginia	Minnesota	Ralph Sampson, Virginia
1979	Indiana	Purdue	Butch Carter and Ray Tolbert, Indiana
1978	Texas	North Carolina State	Jim Krivacs and Ron Baxter, Texas
1977	St. Bonaventure	Houston	Greg Sanders, St. Bonaventure
1976	Kentucky	UNC Charlotte	Cedric Maxwell, UNC Charlotte
1975	Princeton	Providence	Ron Lee, Oregon
1974	Purdue	Utah	Mike Sojourner, Utah
1973	Virginia Tech	Notre Dame	John Shumate, Notre Dame
1972	Maryland	Niagara	Tom McMillen, Maryland
1971	North Carolina	Georgia Tech	Bill Chamberlain, North Carolina
1970	Marquette	St. John's	Dean Meminger, Marquette
1969	Temple	Boston College	Terry Driscoll, Boston College
1968	Dayton	Kansas	Don May, Dayton
1967	Southern Illinois	Marquette	Walt Frazier, Southern Illinois
1966	Brigham Young	NYU	Bill Melchionni, Villanova
1965	St. John's	Villanova	Ken McIntyre, St. John's
1964	Bradley	New Mexico	Levern Tart, Bradley
1963	Providence	Canisius	Ray Flynn, Providence
1962	Dayton	St. John's	Bill Chmielewski, Dayton
1961	Providence	Saint Louis	Vin Ernst, Providence
1960	Bradley	Providence	Lenny Wilkens, Providence
1959	St. John's	Bradley	Tony Jackson, St. John's
1958	Xavier	Dayton	Hank Stein, Xavier
1957	Bradley	Memphis State	Win Wilfong, Memphis State
1956	Louisville	Dayton	Charlie Tyra, Louisville
1955	Duquesne	Dayton	Maurice Stokes, St. Francis (Pa.)
1954	Holy Cross	Duquesne	Togo Palazzi, Holy Cross
1953	Seton Hall	St. John's	Walter Dukes, Seton Hall
1952	La Salle	Dayton	Tom Gola and Norm Grekin, La Salle
1951	Brigham Young	Dayton	Roland Minson, Brigham Young
1950	CCNY	Bradley	Ed Warner, CCNY
1949	San Francisco	Loyola (Chicago)	Don Lofgran, San Francisco
1948	Saint Louis	NYU	Ed Macauley, Saint Louis
1947	Utah	Kentucky	Vern Gardner, Utah
1946	Kentucky	Rhode Island	Ernie Calverley, Rhode Island
1945	DePaul	Bowling Green	George Mikan, DePaul
1944	St. John's	DePaul	Bill Kotsores, St. John's
1943	St. John's	Toledo	Harry Boykoff, St. John's
1942	West Virginia	Western Kentucky	Rudy Baric, West Virginia
1941	Long Island	Ohio	Frankie Baumholtz, Ohio
1940	Colorado	Duquesne	Bob Doll, Colorado
1939	Long Island	Loyola (Chicago)	Bill Lloyd, St. John's
1938	Temple	Colorado	Don Shields, Temple

== Broadcasters ==
CBS televised the NIT from 1966 to 1975. The competition switched to ESPN in 1989.

ESPN Radio aired the NIT from 2011 to 2020. Dial Global (later rebranded Westwood One) took over radio broadcasts in 2021.

== See also ==
- National Commissioners Invitational Tournament
