= St. John's Red Storm men's basketball =

Basketball team in Queens, New York

2026–27 St. John's Red Storm men's basketball team
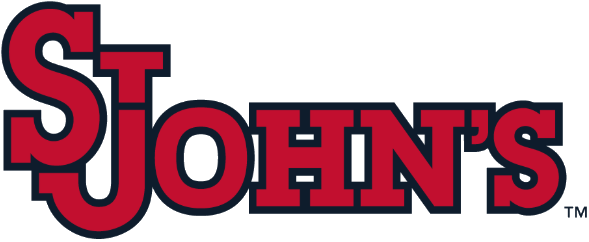
- University: St. John's University
- First season: 1907–08; 119 years ago
- Athletic director: Ed Kull
- Head coach: Rick Pitino; 4th season, 76–24 (.760)
- Location: New York City, United States
- Arena: Carnesecca Arena (5,260); Madison Square Garden (19,812)
- NCAA division: Division I
- Conference: Big East
- Nickname: Red Storm
- Colors: Red and white
- All-time record: 2,044–1,110 (.648)
- NCAA tournament record: 28–33 (.459)

NCAA Division I tournament runner-up
- 1952
Other NCAA Division I tournament results
Final Four	1952, 1985
Elite Eight	1951, 1952, 1979, 1985, 1991, 1999
Sweet Sixteen	1951, 1952, 1967, 1969, 1979, 1983, 1985, 1991, 1999, 2026
Appearances	1951, 1952, 1961, 1967, 1968, 1969, 1973, 1976, 1977, 1978, 1979, 1980, 1982, 1983, 1984, 1985, 1986, 1987, 1988, 1990, 1991, 1992, 1993, 1998, 1999, 2000, 2002*, 2011, 2015, 2019, 2025, 2026

Pre-tournament Helms national champions
- 1910–11

NIT champions
- 1943, 1944, 1959, 1965, 1989, 2003*

Conference tournament champions
- ECAC: 1977, 1978 Big East: 1983, 1986, 2000, 2025, 2026

Conference regular-season champions
- Metro NY: 1943, 1946, 1947, 1949, 1951, 1952, 1958, 1961, 1962 Big East: 1980, 1983, 1985, 1986, 1992, 2025, 2026

Uniforms
Home	Away	Alternate
- * vacated by NCAA

The St. John's Red Storm men's basketball team represents St. John's University, located in Queens, New York City. The team participates in the Big East Conference, of which it is a founding member. As of the end of the 2023–24 season, St. John's ranked ninth all-time among NCAA Division I teams with 1,973 total wins. St. John's has appeared in 32 NCAA tournaments, most recently qualifying as Big East tournament champion in 2026. St. John's best finish in the NCAA tournament came in 1952, when the team, then known as the Redmen, made their first trip to the Final Four and were NCAA runners-up. St. John's made its second and most recent Final Four appearance in 1985. St. John's is coached by Rick Pitino.

St. John's boasts two Wooden Award winners as national player of the year, 11 consensus All-Americans, six members of the College Basketball Hall of Fame, and has sent 59 players to the NBA. However, St. John's currently holds the NCAA Division I record for most NCAA Men's Division I Basketball Championship appearances without a championship. The Red Storm play most of their home games at Madison Square Garden, while their early non-conference games are held at Carnesecca Arena on the St. John's campus in Queens. St. John's University holds the second best winning percentage for a New York City school in the NCAA basketball tournament (second to City College of New York, which won the 1950 NCAA Division I Championship). St. John's has the most NIT appearances with 27, the most championship wins with 6, although they were stripped of one due to an NCAA infraction. The 1910–11 St. John's team finished the season with a 14–0 record and was retroactively named the national champion by the Helms Athletic Foundation and was the highest-ranked team by the retroactive Premo-Porretta Power Poll. While the NCAA lists the historical Helms selections for reference, neither Helms nor Premo-Porretta titles are officially recognized as NCAA national championships. In 2008, St. John's celebrated its 100th year of college basketball.

== History ==
=== Early years (1907–1927) ===
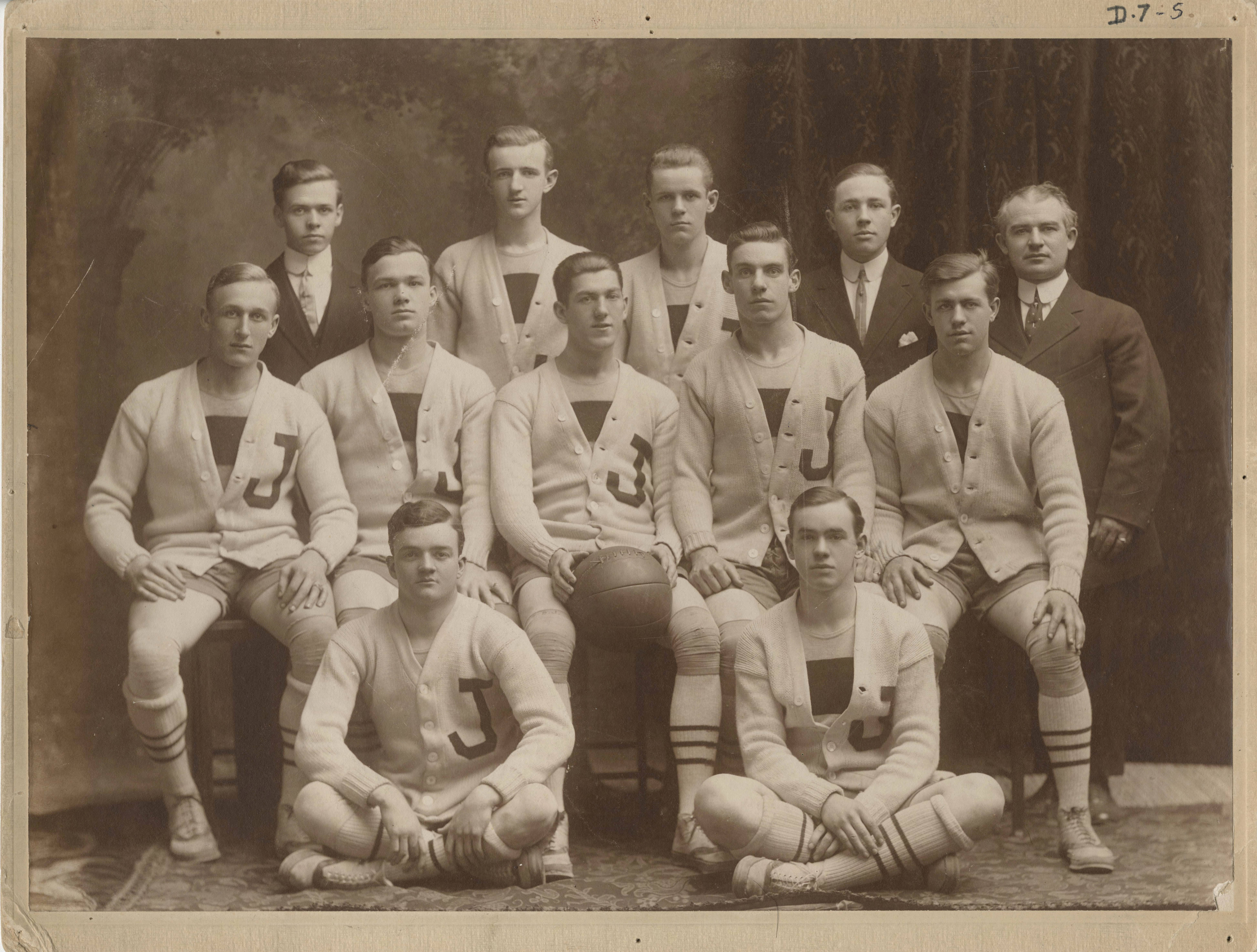
The 1910–11 St. John's basketball team was later honored as national champions by the Helms Athletic Foundation.

The St. John's men's basketball team played its first game on December 6, 1907, losing to New York University and registering its first win in program history against Adelphi University on January 3, 1908. Just three years later, the 1910–11 team were undefeated in a 14–0 season coached by former track and field Olympian Claude Allen, for which the team was later honored by the Helms Foundation as a retroactive national champion and was retroactively ranked as the nation's top team by the Premo-Porretta Power Poll.

=== Buck Freeman era (1927–1936) ===
==== The Wonder Five ====
Twenty years later, former St. John's player Buck Freeman was hired as coach. In his first four years, from 1927 to 1931, the team had a 85–8 record. The 1929–30 and 1930–31 teams were known as the "Wonder Five", made up of Matty Begovich, Mac Kinsbrunner, Max Posnack, Allie Schuckman, and Jack "Rip" Gerson, who together helped revolutionize the game of basketball and made St. John's the marquee team in New York City. On January 19, 1931, the Wonder Five team was a part of the first college basketball triple-header at Madison Square Garden in a charity game which saw St. John's beat CCNY by a score 17–9. Freeman finished his coaching career with a record of 177–31, an .850 winning percentage.

=== First Joe Lapchick era (1936–1947) ===
Joe Lapchick, a former player of the Original Celtics, took over as head coach at St. John's in 1936 and continued the success the school had become used to under Buck Freeman. Lapchick coached from 1936 to 1947 and again from 1956 to 1965. His Redmen teams won four NIT championships (1943, 1944, 1959, 1965). Lapchick preferred to take his teams to the more prestigious NIT instead of the NCAA tournament, making the NIT semifinals 8 out of a total 12 times, and only one NCAA tournament appearance in his 20 years of coaching the Redmen. Under Lapchick's coaching his teams also won six Metropolitan New York Conference regular season titles.

==== Back-to-back NIT Champions ====
On its way to its first of back-to-back NIT titles, St. John's had a record of 21–3 with only two losses occurring during the regular season. One was a 40–46 home loss to rival Niagara and another was a 38–42 loss at Madison Square Garden to Manhattan. The 1942–43 St. John's team were led by senior caption Andrew "Fuzzy" Levane and sophomore All-American center Harry Boykoff. The Redmen's trademark defense and inside scoring presence of Boykoff led them past Rice, Fordham, and Toledo to claim the first of six NIT titles. The season did not end after the NIT; three days later St. John's participated in the first Red Cross charity benefit game against NCAA champion Wyoming to determine a national champion. Wyoming won, 52–47.

St. John's became the first team to repeat as champions in the seven-year history of the NIT even though World War II and the players' commitment to serve in the armed forces made it a very difficult season. Harry Boykoff missed the 1943–44 and 1944–45 seasons due to being drafted for the war effort, along with the team's star point guard Dick McGuire for half the 1943–44 season and the entire following two years. Despite the losses of their star players, the St. John's team managed to finish the season with an 18–5 record and a second NIT crown by defeating Adolph Rupp's Kentucky Wildcats and Ray Meyer's DePaul Blue Demons. The Redmen were led by playmaking junior guards Hy Gotkin and Bill Kotsores, the latter of whom was selected as the 1944 NIT Most Valuable Player. For the second year in a row the Redmen participated in the Red Cross benefit game where they faced the NCAA champion Utah, and lost 36–44. The 1951 1952 team lost to Kentucky 81–40 in December 1951. In the NCAA tournament, St John's beat Kentucky, 64–57. They later finished second in the tournament to Kansas.

St. John's success continued the following year where they produced another 21–3 record, but their chance at a rematch with George Mikan's DePaul squad and a third consecutive NIT title was shattered with an upset loss to Bowling Green in the semifinals. They beat Rhode Island State for a third-place finish. Lapchick's Redmen made the NIT both of the next two years and added two more Metropolitan New York Conference regular season titles before heleft to take the head coaching job of the New York Knickerbockers in just the second year of their existence in the new Basketball Association of America, becoming the highest paid coach of the league at the time.

=== Frank McGuire era (1947–1952) ===
Lapchick was succeeded by Frank McGuire, a former player under Buck Freeman, who made the postseason four out of five years as the coach and had an overall record of 102–36, culminating in a second-place finish in the 1952 NCAA Division I men's basketball tournament. Under McGuire, the Redmen reached an overall number one ranking in The Associated Press poll twice, won three Metropolitan New York Conference regular season titles, competed in four NITs and made their first appearance in the NCAA tournament where they made it to the Elite Eight before falling to eventual national champion Kentucky. They defeated North Carolina State for a regional third-place finish that year.

At the end of the season, McGuire left St. John's to become the basketball coach at the University of North Carolina at Chapel Hill. On paper, this was a significant step down from St. John's, as UNC was not reckoned as a national power at the time. However, school officials wanted a big-name coach to counter the rise of rival North Carolina State under Everett Case. McGuire's assistant coach, Al "Dusty" DeStefano, took over the head coaching duties of St. John's from 1952 to 1956. DeStefano's teams only made one postseason appearance and it was a 58–46 loss to the Seton Hall Pirates in the NIT Finals who were led by All-American center Walter Dukes. The following year, the Redmen had their first losing season in over 30 years.

=== Second Joe Lapchick era (1956–1965) ===
One month after leaving his position with the New York Knicks, Lapchick resumed his head coaching duties where he started and put St. John's back on its winning path. Picking up where he left off, he added two more NIT championships, made the postseason 6 out of 9 times, and finished with an overall college coaching record of 334–130. In 20 years of coaching in the college ranks, Lapchick only had one losing season.

==== 1959 and 1965 NIT Champions ====
St. John's finished the 1958–59 season with an overall 20–6 record and captured its first ECAC Holiday Festival title with a 90–79 victory over St. Joseph's in the final and the school's third NIT championship by defeating top-seeded Bradley 76–70 in double overtime. The starting five for the Redmen consisted of four seniors and sophomore sensation Tony Jackson who was named both the Holiday Festival and NIT Most Valuable Player during the 1958–59 season, setting a school record of 27 rebounds in one game. At the end of the season senior captain Alan Seiden was rewarded with second team All-American honors and the Haggerty Award, given to the best collegiate player in the New York metropolitan area. Throughout the next three years, St. John's went 58–18, led by Jackson who received All-American honors all three years at school, 6'11" center and future NBA champion LeRoy Ellis, and future ABA/NBA coach Kevin Loughery. In the 1961–62 season, St. John's made their fifth NIT finals appearance before falling to Dayton 73–67.

Lapchick went into the 1964–65 season knowing it would be his last year coaching at St. John's because he reached age 65, the mandatory retirement age of the university. His team began the year off by upsetting Cazzie Russell's Michigan Wolverines, the No. 1 team in the nation according to both the Associated Press and United Press International polls, by a score of 75–74 to capture the school's second ECAC Holiday Festival title. St. John's finished the season 21–8 and went on a remarkable run in the 1965 NIT by defeating Boston College, New Mexico, Army, and top-seeded Villanova to win Lapchick his fourth NIT championship. The Redmen were led by the rebounding of sophomore forward Lloyd "Sonny" Dove and the scoring of senior Ken McIntyre who totaled 101 points in his last four games, over 1,000 points for his college career, and being named the Most Valuable Player of both the Holiday Festival and the National Invitational Tournament.

=== Lou Carnesecca era (1965–1992) ===
Lou Carnesecca was hired as the head basketball coach at St. John's in 1965, after serving as an assistant at St. John's since 1958, and given the difficult task to follow in the footsteps of Lapchick. In the 1985 NCAA tournament, he coached the Redmen to their second Final Four appearance. He was named the National Coach of the Year in 1983 and 1985 and Big East Coach of the Year on three occasions. His record at St. John's was 526–200. Carnesecca led the team to its record fifth NIT title in 1989, to the NCAA's Elite Eight in 1979 and 1991, and to the Sweet Sixteen in 1967, 1969, and 1983. Carnesecca temporarily left St. John's to coach in the American Basketball Association from 1970 to 1973, when it was coached by former player Frank Mulzoff, who gathered a record of 56–27 and three post-season appearances. Upon Carnesecca's return, he continued to guide the program to 29 consecutive postseason tournament appearances and to playing in a major conference, the Big East.

=== Recent years (1992–present) ===
==== Fran Fraschilla era (1996–1998) ====
Fran Fraschilla was the head basketball coach at St. John's from 1996, when he was 38 years old, to 1998. He inherited a team that had a record of 11–16 the prior season. To inspire focus on team play, he ordered that his players' names be removed from the backs of their jerseys, to emphasize that the only name that mattered was the one on the front: St. John's. He took the team to its first NCAA basketball tournament in five years in 1998, and his teams had a 59% winning percentage.

== Postseason ==
=== NCAA tournament results ===
The Red Storm have appeared in the NCAA tournament 32 times. Their combined record is 28–33. Due to impermissible benefits to a player, their 2002 appearance has been vacated by the NCAA making their official record 28–32.

Year	Seed	Round	Opponent	Result
1951		Sweet Sixteen; Elite Eight; Regional 3rd Place Game	Connecticut; Kentucky; NC State	W 63–52; L 43–59; W 71–59
1952		Sweet Sixteen; Elite Eight; Final Four; National Championship Game	NC State; Kentucky; Illinois; Kansas	W 60–49; W 64–57; W 61–59; L 63–80
1961		First Round	Wake Forest	L 74–97
1967		First Round; Sweet Sixteen; Regional 3rd Place Game	Temple; Boston College; Princeton	W 57–53; L 62–63; L 58–78
1968		First Round	Davidson	L 70–79
1969		First Round; Sweet Sixteen; Regional 3rd Place Game	Princeton; Davidson; Duquesne	W 72–63; L 69–79; L 72–75
1973		First Round	Penn	L 61–62
1976		First Round	Indiana	L 70–90
1977		First Round	Utah	L 68–72
1978		First Round	Louisville	L 68–76
1979	#10	First Round; Second Round; Sweet Sixteen; Elite Eight	#7 Temple #2 Duke #6 Rutgers #9 Penn	W 75–70; W 80–78; W 67–65; L 62–64
1980	#3	Second Round	#6 Purdue	L 72–87
1982	#5	First Round; Second Round	#12 Penn #4 Alabama	W 66–56; L 68–69
1983	#1	Second Round; Sweet Sixteen	#9 Rutgers #4 Georgia	W 66–55; L 67–70
1984	#9	First Round	#8 Temple	L 63–65
1985	#1	First Round; Second Round; Sweet Sixteen; Elite Eight; Final Four	#16 Southern #9 Arkansas #12 Kentucky #3 NC State #1 Georgetown	W 83–59; W 68–65; W 86–70; W 69–60; L 59–77
1986	#1	First Round; Second Round	#16 Montana State #8 Auburn	W 83–74; L 65–81
1987	#6	First Round; Second Round	#11 Wichita State #3 DePaul	W 57–55; L 75–83 ^{OT}
1988	#11	First Round	#6 Florida	L 59–62
1990	#6	First Round; Second Round	#11 Temple #3 Duke	W 81–65; L 72–76
1991	#4	First Round; Second Round; Sweet Sixteen; Elite Eight	#13 Northern Illinois #5 Texas #1 Ohio State #2 Duke	W 75–68; W 84–76; W 91–74; L 61–78
1992	#7	First Round	#10 Tulane	L 57–61
1993	#5	First Round; Second Round	#12 Texas Tech #4 Arkansas	W 85–67; L 74–80
1998	#7	First Round	#10 Detroit	L 64–66
1999	#3	First Round; Second Round; Sweet Sixteen; Elite Eight	#14 Samford #6 Indiana #2 Maryland #4 Ohio State	W 69–43; W 86–61; W 76–62; L 74–77
2000	#2	First Round; Second Round	#15 Northern Arizona #10 Gonzaga	W 61–56; L 76–82
2002*	#9	First Round	#8 Wisconsin	L 70–80
2011	#6	Second Round	#11 Gonzaga	L 71–86
2015	#9	Second Round	#8 San Diego State	L 64–76
2019	#11	First Four	#11 Arizona State	L 65–74
2025	#2	First Round; Second Round	#15 Omaha #10 Arkansas	W 83–53; L 66–75
2026	#5	First Round; Second Round; Sweet Sixteen	#12 Northern Iowa #4 Kansas #1 Duke	W 79–53; W 67–65; L 75–80

* Vacated by the NCAA

=== NIT results ===
The Red Storm have appeared in the National Invitation Tournament (NIT) 30 times. Their combined record is 45–30. They are six-time NIT Champions (1943, 1944, 1959, 1965, 1989, 2003). Due to impermissible benefits to a player, their 2003 appearance (and title) has been vacated by the NCAA, making their official record 40–30.

Year	Round	Opponent	Result
1939	Quarterfinals; Semifinals; 3rd Place Game	Roanoke; Loyola–Chicago; Bradley	W 71–47; L 46–51; L 35–40
1940	Quarterfinals	Duquesne	L 31–38
1943	Quarterfinals; Semifinals; Final	Rice; Fordham; Toledo	W 51–49; W 69–43; W 48–27
1944	Quarterfinals; Semifinals; Final	Bowling Green; Kentucky; DePaul	W 44–40; W 48–45; W 47–39
1945	Quarterfinals; Semifinals; 3rd Place Game	Muhlenberg; Bowling Green; Rhode Island	W 34–33; L 44–57; W 64–57
1946	Quarterfinals	West Virginia	L 58–70
1947	Quarterfinals	NC State	L 55–61
1949	First Round	Bowling Green	L 64–77
1950	Quarterfinals; Semifinals; 3rd Place Game	WKU; Bradley; Duquesne	W 65–46; L 72–82; W 69–67
1951	Quarterfinals; Semifinals; 3rd Place Game	St. Bonaventure; Dayton; Seton Hall	W 60–58; L 62–69; W 70–68
1952	Quarterfinals	La Salle	L 45–51
1953	First Round; Quarterfinals; Semifinals; Final	Saint Louis; La Salle; Duquesne; Seton Hall	W 81–66; W 75–74; W 75–74; L 46–58
1958	First Round; Quarterfinals; Semifinals; 3rd Place Game	Butler; Utah; Dayton; St. Bonaventure	W 76–69; W 71–70; L 56–80; L 69–84
1959	First Round; Quarterfinals; Semifinals; Final	Villanova; St. Bonaventure; Providence; Bradley	W 75–67; W 82–74; W 76–55; W 76–71
1960	Quarterfinals	St. Bonaventure	L 71–106
1962	Quarterfinals; Semifinals; Finals	Holy Cross; Duquesne; Dayton	W 80–74; W 75–65; L 67–73
1965	First Round; Quarterfinals; Semifinals; Final	Boston College; New Mexico; Army; Villanova	W 114–92; W 61–54; W 67–60; W 55–51
1966	First Round	Villanova	L 61–63
1970	First Round; Quarterfinals; Semifinals; Final	Miami (OH); Georgia Tech; Army; Marquette	W 70–57; W 56–55; W 60–59; L 53–65
1971	First Round	Tennessee	L 83–84
1972	First Round; Quarterfinals; Semifinals; 3rd Place Game	Missouri; Oral Roberts; Niagara; Jacksonville	W 82–81; W 94–78; L 67–69; L 80–83
1974	First Round	Connecticut	L 70–82
1975	First Round; Quarterfinals; Semifinals; 3rd Place Game	Lafayette; Manhattan; Providence; Oregon	W 94–76; W 57–56; L 72–85; L 76–80

Year	Round	Opponent	Result
1981	First Round	Alabama	L 69–73
1989	First Round; Second Round; Quarterfinals; Semifinals; Final	Ole Miss; Oklahoma State; Ohio State; UAB; Saint Louis	W 70–67; W 76–64; W 83–80; W 76–65; W 73–65
1995	First Round	South Florida	L 68–74
2003*	First Round; Second Round; Quarterfinals; Semifinals; Final	Boston University; Virginia; UAB; Texas Tech; Georgetown	W 73–57; W 73–63; W 79–71; W 64–63; W 70–67
2010	First Round	Memphis	L 71–73
2013	First Round; Second Round	Saint Joseph's; Virginia	W 63–61; L 50–68
2014	First Round	Robert Morris	L 78–89

* Vacated by the NCAA

== Coaching history ==
*	Elected to the Naismith Memorial Basketball Hall of Fame

			Overall		Conference		Postseason	
Coach	Years	Seasons	Record	Winning %	Record	Winning %	Record	Winning %
J. Chestnut	1907–08	1	4–8	.333				
P. Joseph Kersey	1908–09	1	9–6	.600				
Harry A. Fisher	1909–10	1	15–5	.750				
Claude Allen	1910–11, 1912–14	3	33–19	.635				
Joseph O'Shea	1911–12, 1914–17	4	43–27	.614				
John Crenny	1918–21, 1922–27	8	105–86	.550				
Ed Kelleher	1921–22	1	10–11	.476				
Buck Freeman	1927–36	9	177–31	.851				
Joe Lapchick	1936–47, 1956–65	20	334–130	.720			21–11	.656
Frank McGuire	1947–52	5	102–36	.739			9–6	.600
Dusty DeStefano	1952–56	4	49–39	.563			3–1	.750
Lou Carnesecca	1965–70, 1973–92	24	526–200	.725	139–80	.635	46–40	.535
Frank Mulzoff	1970–73	3	56–27	.675			2–4	.333
Brian Mahoney	1992–96	4	56–58	.491	29–43	.403	3–6	.333
Fran Fraschilla	1996–98	2	35–24	.593	21–15	.583	2–2	.500
Mike Jarvis	1998–2003	6	66–60	.524	57–36	.613	16–7	.696
Kevin Clark	2003–04		2–17	.105	1–15	.064		
Norm Roberts	2004–10	6	81–101	.445	32–70	.313	2–5	.286
Steve Lavin	2010–2015	5	81–53	.604	40–30	.571	2–8	.200
Mike Dunlap	2011–2012		11–17	.392	6–12	.400	0–1	.000
Chris Mullin	2015–2019	4	59–73	.447	20–52	.278	4–4	.500
Mike Anderson	2019–2023	4	68–56	.548	30–46	.395	3–3	.500
Rick Pitino	2023–present	3	81–25	.764	47–13	.783	10–3	.769
Totals		119	2,003–1,110	.643	422–412	.506	123–101	.549

== St. John's rivalries ==
=== Big East rivalries ===
The St. John's-Georgetown rivalry was one of the most intense matchups in the Big East during the 1980s, highlighted by the 1985 Big East Championship, 1985 NCAA semifinal game, the "Sweater Game" between Hall of Fame coaches Lou Carnesecca and John Thompson, and Hall of Fame players Chris Mullin and Patrick Ewing. St. John's fans also count other East Coast rivals the Villanova Wildcats, Providence Friars, Seton Hall Pirates, and former Big East founders Syracuse Orange and the Boston College Eagles along with the Connecticut Huskies and Pittsburgh Panthers among their most frequently played opponents.

Rank	Opponent	Meetings	Record	Win Pct.	First Meeting	Last Meeting
1	Villanova	135	68–67	.504	December 20, 1909, W 38–9	February 28, 2026, W 89–57
2	Providence	129	70–59	.543	February 25, 1927, L 33–36	March 12, 2026, W 85–72
3	Georgetown	128	71–57	.555	December 8, 1909, W 41–26	March 3, 2026, W 72–69
4	Seton Hall	118	68–50	.576	January 13, 1909, W 35–15	March 13, 2026, W 78–68
5	Syracuse	93	42–51	.452	February 8, 1912, L 19–25	November 15, 2026, W 79–62
6	Connecticut	76	41–35	.539	March 20, 1951, W 63–52	March 14, 2026, W 72–52
7	Boston College	74	46–28	.622	February 7, 1946, W 69–44	December 10, 2023, L 80–86
8	Pittsburgh	69	34–25	.576	February 23, 1956, W 81–76	December 18, 2021, L 57–59
9	DePaul	60	37–22	.627	January 27, 1932, W 35–21	February 4, 2026, W 68–56
10	Marquette	50	21–29	.420	January 28, 1960, W 69–63	February 18, 2026, W 76–70

=== New York rivalries ===
St. John's fifth most frequent played opponent is fellow Vincentian and Western New York college, the Niagara Purple Eagles. The universities have played each other every college basketball season since 1909. St. John's also frequently plays other New York City opponents representing the four other NYC boroughs; the Fordham Rams and Manhattan Jaspers of The Bronx, the St. Francis Terriers and LIU Blackbirds of Brooklyn, the NYU Violets and CCNY Beavers of Manhattan, and the Wagner Seahawks of Staten Island. These teams were all instrumental in creating the postseason National Invitational Tournament hosted annually at Madison Square Garden. From 1933 to 1963 most of these schools came together to play each other in the Metropolitan New York Conference. The Red Storm own an all-time record of 250–86 against these other New York City schools.

Rank	Opponent	Meetings	Record	Win Pct	First Meeting	Last Meeting
1.	Niagara	101	74–27	.733	January 7, 1909, W 21–19	November 26, 2022, W, 78–70
2.	Fordham	91	72–19	.791	January 30, 1909, L 13–21	November 4, 2024, W, 92–60
3.	Manhattan	87	62–25	.713	December 10, 1907, L 17–34	December 27, 2002, L, 65–72
4.	St. Francis (NY)	80	68–12	.850	January 10, 1908, W 23–12	November 30, 2021, W, 76–70
5.	NYU	51	29–22	.569	December 6, 1907, L 13–34	March 11, 1971, W, 85–74
6.	CCNY	40	25–15	.625	February 13, 1915, W 30–22	February 15, 1960, W, 93–67
7.	Hofstra	28	23–5	.821	February 8, 1940, W 64–30	December 30, 2023, W 84–79
8.	Columbia	26	19–7	.731	December 15, 1916, L 19–34	November 20, 2019, W, 82–63
9.	Wagner	22	20–2	.909	December 6, 1935, W 67–36	November 13, 2024, W, 66–45
10.	LIU	14	10–4	.714	January 13, 1931, W 38–27	December 11, 2016, L, 73–74

== St. John's program records ==
Career individual records
Rebounds	George Johnson – 1,240 rebounds
Assists	Mark Jackson – 738 assists
Steals	Malik Sealy – 238 steals
Blocks	Chris Obekpa – 321 blocks
Points Scored	Chris Mullin – 2,440 points
Field Goals Made	Malik Sealy – 900 field goals
3-Point Field Goals Made	D'Angelo Harrison – 264 3-point field goals
Free Throws Made	Chris Mullin – 682 free throws
Scoring Average	Marcus Hatten – 21.1 points
Games Played	Mark Jackson – 131 games

Season individual records
Rebounds	Mel Davis – 436 rebounds
Assists	Mark Jackson – 328 assists
Steals	Marcus Hatten – 105 steals
Blocks	Chris Obekpa – 133 blocks
Points Scored	Walter Berry – 828 points
Field Goals Made	Walter Berry – 327 field goals
3-Point Field Goals Made	D'Angelo Harrison – 76 3-point field goals
Free Throws Made	Bob Zawoluk – 208 free throws
Scoring Average	Billy Schaeffer – 24.7 points

Game individual records
Rebounds	LeRoy Ellis – 30 rebounds
Assists	Omar Cook – 17 assists
Steals	Marcus Hatten – 10 steals
Blocks	Chris Obekpa – 11 blocks
Points Scored	Bob Zawoluk – 65 points
Field Goals Made	Bob Zawoluk – 25 field goals
3-Point Field Goals Made	Avery Patterson – 8 3-point field goals
Free Throws Made	Marcus Hatten – 21 free throws

== Notable players and coaches ==
List of players and coaches honored

"St. John's Legends"
No.	Player	Pos.	Tenure
–	Lou Carnesecca	HC	1965–70, 1973–92
13	Mark Jackson	PG	1983–87
20	Chris Mullin	SF	1981–85
21	Malik Sealy	SF	1988–92
21	Walter Berry	PF	1984–86
21	Dick McGuire	PG	1943–49
24	Tony Jackson	SF	1958–61
33	Alan Seiden	PG	1956–59
55	Sonny Dove	SF	1964–67
–	Joe Lapchick	HC	1936–47, 1956–65

=== Naismith Memorial Basketball Hall of Fame Members ===
The following St. John's players, coaches, and contributors have been enshrined in the Naismith Hall of Fame.

Year Inducted	Name	Position	Years at St. John's	Enshrined as
1959, 1966	Joe Lapchick	Head coach	1936–1947; 1956–1965	Player, Coach
1977	Frank McGuire	Player, Head Coach	1947–1952	Coach
1982	Willis Reed	Volunteer Coach	1980–1981	Player
1992	Lou Carnesecca	Head coach	1965–1970; 1973–1992	Coach
1992	Al McGuire	Player	1947–1951	Coach
1993	Dick McGuire	Player	1943–1944; 1946–1949	Player
2010, 2011	Chris Mullin	Player, Head Coach	1981–1985; 2015–2019	Player (2)
2014	Mitch Richmond	Assistant Coach	2015–2019	Player
2013	Rick Pitino	Head coach	2023–present	Coach

=== McDonald's High School All-Americans ===
Year	Player Selections
1977	Wayne McKoy
1981	Chris Mullin & Bill Wennington
1984	Shelton Jones
1985	Michael Porter
1988	Malik Sealy & Robert Werdann
1994	Felipe Lopez & Zendon Hamilton
1997	Ron Artest
1998	Erick Barkley
2000	Omar Cook & Darius Miles
2002	Elijah Ingram
2022	Dillon Mitchell
2024	Ian Jackson & Donnie Freeman
2025	Tounde Yessoufou

=== Olympians ===
The following St. John's players and coaches have represented their country in basketball in the Summer Olympic Games:

Year	Player	Country	Location	Place
1984	Chris Mullin	United States	Los Angeles	Gold medal
1984	Bill Wennington	Canada	Los Angeles	**4th Place**
1992	Chris Mullin	United States	Barcelona	Gold medal
2000	Rowan Barrett	Canada	Sydney	**7th Place**
2024	Arnaldo Toro	Puerto Rico	Paris	**12th Place**

=== Players in the NBA ===
Red Storm in the NBA
NBA Draft Selections
Total Selections in Draft:	63
Lottery Picks in Draft:	3
1st Round Picks:	17
No. 1 Overall Picks:	0
Notable achievements
NBA Champions:	3
NBA All-Stars:	6
Naismith-Basketball-Hall-of-Famers:	7

==== Current ====
Player	Team
Julian Champagnie	San Antonio Spurs
Daniss Jenkins	Detroit Pistons
Zuby Ejiofor	Atlanta Hawks

==== All-time ====
^	Denotes player who has been inducted to the Naismith Memorial Basketball Hall of Fame
*	Denotes player who has been selected for at least one All-Star Game and All-NBA Team
^{+}	Denotes player who has been selected for at least one All-Star Game
^{x}	Denotes player who has been selected for at least one All-NBA Team
^{~}	Denotes player who has been selected as Rookie of the Year

Bold indicates players considered active in the 2025–26 NBA season. All stats updated through end of 2025–26 season.

Draft Year	Round	Pick	Overall	Player	Draft Team	Pro Seasons
2026	2	49	49	**Bryce Hopkins**	Denver Nuggets	2026–present (1)
2026	2	40	40	**Dillon Mitchell**	Boston Celtics	2026–present (1)
2026	1	23	23	**Zuby Ejiofor**	Atlanta Hawks	2026–present (1)
2025	–	–	–	Kadary Richmond	Undrafted	2025–2026 (1)
2024	–	–	–	**Daniss Jenkins**	Undrafted	2024–present (2)
2022	–	–	–	**Julian Champagnie**	Undrafted	2022–present (4)
2019	–	–	–	Tariq Owens	Undrafted	2019–2020 (1)
2019	–	–	–	Shamorie Ponds	Undrafted	2019–2020 (1)
2015	2	23	53	Sir'Dominic Pointer	Cleveland Cavaliers	–
2014	–	–	–	JaKarr Sampson	Undrafted	2014–2021 (6)
2012	1	15	15	Maurice Harkless	Philadelphia 76ers	2012–2022 (10)
2011	–	–	–	D.J. Kennedy	Undrafted	2011–2012 (1)
2009	–	–	–	Cedric Jackson	Undrafted	2009–2010 (1)
2001	2	3	31	Omar Cook	Orlando Magic	2004–2005 (2)
2000	2	10	39	Lavor Postell	New York Knicks	2000–2003 (3)
2000	1	28	28	Erick Barkley	Portland Trail Blazers	2000–2002 (2)
1999	1	16	16	Ron Artest*	Chicago Bulls	1999–2017 (17)
1998	–	–	–	Zendon Hamilton	Undrafted	2000–2006 (6)
1998	1	24	24	Felipe Lopez	San Antonio Spurs	1998–2002 (4)
1995	–	–	–	James Scott	Undrafted	1996–1997 (1)
1994	2	16	43	Shawnelle Scott	Portland Trail Blazers	1996–2002 (4)
1992	2	19	46	Robert Werdann	Denver Nuggets	1992–1997 (3)
1992	1	14	14	Malik Sealy	Indiana Pacers	1992–2000 (8)
1990	1	21	21	Jayson Williams+	Phoenix Suns	1990–1999 (9)
1988	2	2	27	Shelton Jones	San Antonio Spurs	1988–1989 (1)
1987	3	23	69	Willie Glass	Los Angeles Lakers	–
1987	1	18	18	Mark Jackson~	New York Knicks	1987–2004 (18)
1986	3	20	67	Ron Rowan	Philadelphia 76ers	1986–1987 (1)
1986	1	14	14	Walter Berry	Portland Trail Blazers	1986–1989 (3)
1985	1	16	16	Bill Wennington	Dallas Mavericks	1985–2000 (13)
1985	1	7	7	Chris Mullin^	Golden State Warriors	1985–2001 (16)
1984	3	9	56	Jeff Allen	Kansas City Kings	–
1983	3	18	65	Billy Goodwin	Milwaukee Bucks	–
1983	2	22	46	Kevin Williams	San Antonio Spurs	1983–1988 (7)
1983	2	13	37	David Russell	Denver Nuggets	–
1982	No selections					
1981	8	–	183	Frank Gilroy	Philadelphia 76ers	–
1981	8	–	169	Curtis Redding	Denver Nuggets	–
1981	3	–	63	Wayne McKoy	New York Knicks	–
1980	6	–	120	Bernard Rencher	Chicago Bulls	–
1979	10	–	189	Gordon Thomas	New York Knicks	–
1979	2	5	27	Reggie Carter	New York Knicks	1980–1982 (2)
1978	1	12	12	George Johnson	Milwaukee Bucks	1978–1985 (7)
1977	7	9	140	Tom Weadock	New York Knicks	–
1977	5	5	93	Cecil Rellford	Phoenix Suns	–
1977	2	5	27	Glen Williams	Milwaukee Bucks	–
1976	5	8	76	Beaver Smith	New York Knicks	–
1975	4	13	67	Kevin Cluess	Kansas City Kings	–
1975	2	15	33	Mel Utley	Cleveland Cavaliers	–
1974	5	10	82	Ed Searcy	New Orleans Jazz	1975–1976 (1)
1973	17	1	203	Tony Prince	Philadelphia 76ers	–
1973	2	5	23	Billy Schaeffer	Los Angeles Lakers	–
1973	1	14	14	Mel Davis	New York Knicks	1973–1977 (4)
1972	6	11	91	Greg Cluess	New York Knicks	–
1971	No selections					
1970	7	1	103	Billy Paultz	San Diego Rockets	1970–1985 (15)
1970	2	12	29	Joe DePre	Phoenix Suns	–
1969	1	11	11	John Warren	New York Knicks	1969–1974 (5)
1968	12	–	164	Rudy Bogad	Baltimore Bullets	–
1967	1	–	4	Sonny Dove	Detroit Pistons	1967–1969 (2)
1966	4	–	34	Bob McIntyre	Saint Louis Hawks	–
1965	3	–	19	Ken McIntyre	Saint Louis Hawks	–
1964	No selections					
1963	No selections					
1962	2	–	11	Kevin Loughery	Detroit Pistons	1962–1973 (11)
1962	1	–	6	LeRoy Ellis	Los Angeles Lakers	1962–1976 (14)
1961	3	–	24	Tony Jackson	New York Knicks	–
1960	No selections					
1959	2	–	12	Alan Seiden	Saint Louis Hawks	–
1958	No selections					
1957	2	–	9	Dick Duckett	Cincinnati Royals	1957–1958 (1)
1956	No selections					
1955	9	–	69	Marty Satalino	Syracuse Nationals	–
1954	7	–	62	Solly Walker	New York Knicks	–
1954	6	–	52	Red Davis	Rochester Royals	1955–1956 (1)
1953	No selections					
1952	4	–	38	Ronnie MacGilvray	Rochester Royals	1954–1955 (1)
1952	2	–	18	Jack McMahon	Rochester Royals	1952–1960 (8)
1952	2	–	14	Bob Zawoluk	Indianapolis Olympians	1952–1955 (3)
1951	6	–	55	Al McGuire^	New York Knicks	1951–1955 (4)
1950	2	–	23	Gerald Calabrese	Syracuse Nationals	1950–1952 (2)
1949	1	–	7	Dick McGuire^	New York Knicks	1949–1960 (11)
1948	No selections					
1947	–	–	–	Harry Boykoff	Undrafted	1949–1951 (2)
1946	–	–	–	Ken Keller	Undrafted	1946–1947 (1)
1946	–	–	–	Max Zaslofsky*	Undrafted	1946–1956 (10)

=== Players in Professional Basketball ===
Red Storm in the Pros
Playing domestically
Current NBA Players	2
Current G-League Players	3
Playing internationally
Current Players Overseas:	21
League Championships:	20

Draft Year	Last Country	Last League	Player	Current team	Pro Seasons
2025	(United States)	**G-League**	**Aaron Scott**	**Long Island Nets**	**2025–present (2)**
2025	(United States)	**G-League**	**Kadary Richmond**	**Cleveland Charge**	**2025–present (2)**
2025	(United States)	**G-League**	**Deivon Smith**	**Santa Cruz Warriors**	**2025–present (2)**
2024	(Spain)	**Liga ACB**	**Joel Soriano**	**Obradoiro CAB**	**2024–present (3)**
2024	(Germany)	**BBL**	**Nahiem Alleyne**	**Skyliners Frankfurt**	**2024–present (3)**
2024	(Australia)	**Big V**	**Sean Conway**	**Camberwell Dragons**	**2024–present (3)**
2024	(Russia)	**VTB United League**	**Chris Ledlum**	**BC Zenit Saint Petersburg**	**2024–present (3)**
2024	(United States)	**G-League**	**Jordan Dingle**	**Long Island Nets**	**2024–present (3)**
2022	(Germany)	**BBL**	**Stef Smith**	**Niners Chemnitz**	**2022–present (5)**
2022	(Israel)	**IBSL**	**Aaron Wheeler**	**Hapoel Ironi Eilat**	**2022–present (5)**
2021	(Japan)	**B.League**	**Arnaldo Toro**	**Iwate Big Bulls**	**2021–present (6)**
2020	(Uruguay)	**LUB**	**Mustapha Heron**	**Defensor Sporting**	**2020–present (7)**
2019	(China)	**CBL**	**Shamorie Ponds**	**Hong Kong Bulls**	**2019–present (8)**
2019	(Saudi Arabia)	**SBL**	**Marvin Clark II**	**Al-Ittihad Jeddah**	**2019–present (8)**
2019	(Germany)	**BBL**	**Justin Simon**	**Gladiators Trier**	**2019–present (8)**
2018	(China)	**NBL**	**Marcus LoVett Jr.**	**Henan Golden Elephants**	**2018–present (9)**
2018	(Italy)	**LBA**	**Amar Alibegović**	**Derthona Basket**	**2018–present (9)**
2017	(Italy)	**Serie A2**	**Federico Mussini**	**Avellino Basket**	**2017–present (10)**
2016	(Germany)	**ProA**	**Ron Mvouika**	**ART Giants Düsseldorf**	**2016–present (7)**
2016	(Spain)	LEB Oro	Felix Balamou	CB Clavijo	2017–2018 (1)
2016	(Switzerland)	LNA	Durand Johnson	Union Neuchâtel Basket	2016–2017 (1)
2015	(Syria)	**SBL**	**D'Angelo Harrison**	**Al-Ittihad SC Aleppo**	**2015–present (12)**
2015	(Egypt)	**SBL**	**Sir'Dominic Pointer**	**Al-Ittihad SC Aleppo**	**2015–present (12)**
2015	(Germany)	**BBL**	**Phil Greene IV**	**Rostock Seawolves**	**2015–present (12)**
2015	(Canada)	NBL Canada	Jamal Branch	Cape Breton Highlanders	2015–2018 (4)
2014	(Dominican Republic)	TBS	Orlando Sánchez	San Lázaro	2014–2023 (9)
2014	(China)	**CBA**	**JaKarr Sampson**	**Beijing Ducks**	**2014–present (13)**
2011	(Philippines)	**PBA**	**Justin Brownlee**	**Barangay Ginebra San Miguel**	**2011–present (16)**
2011	(Turkey)	TBL	Dwight Hardy	OGM Ormanspor	2011–2021 (10)
2011	(Israel)	**IBSL**	**D.J. Kennedy**	**Hapoel Galil Elyon**	**2011–present (16)**
2011	(Finland)	Korisliiga	Paris Horne	Kouvot	2011–2016 (5)
2011	(Romania)	LNBM	Sean Evans	Dinamo B.	2011–2024 (13)
2011	(Japan)	**B.League**	**Justin Burrell**	**Niigata Albirex BB**	**2011–present (16)**
2009	(United States)	D-League	Anthony Mason Jr.	Sioux Falls Skyforce	2010–2014 (4)
2008	(Russia)	Super Liga 1	Eugene Lawrence	BC Novosibirsk	2008–2022 (14)
2007	(United States)	Independent	Daryll Hill	Harlem Globetrotters	2007–2010 (3)
2007	(Japan)	B.League	Lamont Hamilton	Niigata Albirex BB	2007–2020 (14)
2003	(Germany)	BBL	Marcus Hatten	Mitteldeutscher BC	2003–2018 (15)
2003	(Argentina)	TNA	Anthony Glover	9 de Julio de Río Tercero	2003–2015 (12)
2001	(Spain)	Liga ACB	Omar Cook	Casademont Zaragoza	2001–2022 (21)
2000	(France)	LNB Pro A	Bootsy Thornton	Strasbourg IG	2000–2014 (14)
1999	(Greece)	Greek A1	Tyrone Grant	Ilysiakos B.C.	2000–2011 (11)
1997	(Ukraine)	USL	Charles Minlend	BC Cherkaski Mavpy	1997–2008 (11)
1996	(France)	LNB Pro A	Rowan Barrett	Élan Chalon	1996–2008 (12)
1991	(United Kingdom)	BBL	Billy Singleton	Chester Jets	1991–2007 (16)
1990	(Austria)	OBL	Boo Harvey	Trodat B.C.	1990–1995 (5)
1988	(United States)	CBA	Shelton Jones	Great Lakes Storm	1988–2004 (16)
1988	(Italy)	LBA	Marco Baldi	Olimpia Milano	1988–2001 (13)
**Bold** Active players League champion League All-Star League champion and All-Star

- **Justin Simon** (born 1996) – basketball player for Bnei Herzliya of the Israeli Basketball Premier League

== Awards and honors ==
=== National award winners ===
National Player of the Year
1976	Frank Alagia	Francis Pomeroy
1985	Chris Mullin	Wooden Award, USBWA, UPI
1986	Walter Berry	Wooden Award, USBWA, UPI, NABC, AP, SN, AR
1990	Boo Harvey	Francis Pomeroy
2026	Zuby Ejiofor	Kareem Abdul-Jabbar Award

National Coach of the Year
1983	Lou Carnesecca	Henry Iba Award, NABC Coach of the Year
1985	Lou Carnesecca	Henry Iba Award, UPI Coach of the Year
2025	Rick Pitino	Henry Iba Award, AP Coach of the Year

Academic All-American of the Year
2025	RJ Luis Jr.

NIT Most Valuable Player
1939	Bill Lloyd
1943	Harry Boykoff
1944	Bill Kotsores
1959	Tony Jackson
1965	Ken McIntyre
1989	Jayson Williams
2003	Marcus Hatten

All-America team selections

Year	Name	Pos.
1911	John Keenan*	G
1943	Harry Boykoff*	C
1944	Dick McGuire	G
1948	Dick McGuire‡	G
1949	Dick McGuire	G
1950	Gerry Calabrese‡	G
1950	Al McGuire‡	G
1950	Zeke Zawoluk‡	F
1951	Zeke Zawoluk	F
1952	Zeke Zawoluk†	F
1959	Alan Seiden†	G
1959	Tony Jackson‡	F
1960	Tony Jackson†	F
1961	Tony Jackson†	F

Year	Name	Pos.
1967	Sonny Dove†	F
1972	Mel Davis	F
1973	Billy Schaeffer	G
1977	Glenn Williams‡	G
1980	Reggie Carter	G
1981	David Russell‡	F
1982	David Russell‡	F
1983	David Russell‡	F
1983	Chris Mullin	G
1984	Chris Mullin†	G
1985	Chris Mullin*	G
1985	Walter Berry‡	F
1986	Walter Berry*	F
1986	Mark Jackson‡	G

Year	Name	Pos.
1987	Mark Jackson†	G
1990	Boo Harvey‡	G
1991	Malik Sealy‡	F
1992	Malik Sealy†	F
1999	Ron Artest	F
2000	Erick Barkley‡	G
2011	Dwight Hardy‡	G
2018	Shamorie Ponds‡	G
2019	Shamorie Ponds‡	G
2025	RJ Luis Jr.†	F
2026	Zuby Ejiofor‡	F/C

* – denotes Consensus First-Team All-Americans
↑ – denotes Consensus Second-Team All-Americans
‡ – denotes AP Honorable Mention selections

=== Big East Conference award winners ===
Big East Player of the Year
1983	Chris Mullin
1984	Chris Mullin
1985	Chris Mullin
1986	Walter Berry
2025	RJ Luis Jr.
2026	Zuby Ejiofor
Big East Coach of the Year
1983	Lou Carnesecca
1985	Lou Carnesecca
1986	Lou Carnesecca
1993	Brian Mahoney
2021	Mike Anderson
2025	Rick Pitino

Defensive Player of the Year
1987	Mark Jackson
2015	Sir'Dominic Pointer
2019	Justin Simon
2021	Posh Alexander
2026	Zuby Ejiofor
Freshman of the Year
1980	David Russell
2012	Moe Harkless
2013	JaKarr Sampson
2021	Posh Alexander
Sixth Man of the Year
2011	Justin Burrell

Most Improved Player
2011	Dwight Hardy
2015	Sir'Dominic Pointer
2021	Julian Champagnie
2023	Joel Soriano
2025	Zuby Ejiofor
Scholar-Athlete of the Year
1985	Mike Moses
1986	Ron Rowan
2000	Lavor Postell
2026	Zuby Ejiofor

All-Big East team selections

Year	Name	Pos.
1980	Reggie Carter†	G
1980	Wayne McKoy‡	C
1980	David Russell‡	F
1981	David Russell‡	F
1982	David Russell†	F
1982	Chris Mullin‡	G
1983	David Russell‡	F
1983	Chris Mullin†	G
1984	Chris Mullin†	G
1985	Chris Mullin†	G
1985	Bill Wennington‡	C
1985	Walter Berry‡	F
1986	Walter Berry†	F
1986	Mark Jackson†	G
1987	Mark Jackson†	G

Year	Name	Pos.
1988	Shelton Jones‡	F
1989	Jayson Williams‡	F
1990	Boo Harvey†	G
1990	Malik Sealy‡	F
1991	Jason Buchanan‡	G
1991	Malik Sealy†	F
1992	Malik Sealy†	F
1993	David Cain†	G
1993	Shawnelle Scott‡	F
1996	Zendon Hamilton‡	F
1997	Zendon Hamilton‡	F
1998	Zendon Hamilton‡	F
1998	Felipe Lopez†	G
1999	Ron Artest†	F
1999	Bootsy Thornton‡	G

Year	Name	Pos.
2000	Erick Barkley†	G
2000	Lavor Postell‡	F
2002	Marcus Hatten†	G
2003	Marcus Hatten†	G
2007	Lamont Hamilton†	F
2011	Dwight Hardy†	G
2014	D'Angelo Harrison†	G
2015	D'Angelo Harrison†	G
2015	Sir'Dominic Pointer‡	F
2018	Shamorie Ponds†	G
2019	Shamorie Ponds†	G
2021	Julian Champagnie†	G/F
2022	Julian Champagnie†	G/F
2023	Joel Soriano‡	C
2024	Daniss Jenkins‡	G

Year	Name	Pos.
2025	Kadary Richmond‡	G
2025	RJ Luis Jr.†	G/F
2025	Zuby Ejiofor†	F
2026	Zuby Ejiofor†	F
2026	Bryce Hopkins‡	F

† – denotes First-Team All-Big East
‡ – denotes Second-Team All-Big East

=== Metropolitan Basketball Writers Association award winners ===
Lt. Frank J. Haggerty Award MWBA Division I player of the year
1941	Dutch Garfinkel	1984	Chris Mullin
1942	Jim White	1985	Chris Mullin
1943	Fuzzy Levane	1986	Walter Berry
1944	Dick McGuire	1987	Mark Jackson
1945	Bill Kotsores	1990	Boo Harvey
1949	Dick McGuire	1991	Malik Sealy
1952	Ronnie MacGilvray	1992	Malik Sealy
1959	Alan Seiden	1998	Felipe López
1961	Tony Jackson	1999	Ron Artest
1962	LeRoy Ellis	2002	Marcus Hatten
1967	Sonny Dove	2014	D'Angelo Harrison
1973	Billy Schaeffer	2015	Sir'Dominic Pointer
1978	George Johnson	2018	Shamorie Ponds
1983	Chris Mullin	2025	RJ Luis Jr.

Lou Carnesecca "The Looie" Award MWBA Division I coach of the year
1983	Lou Carnesecca
1985	Lou Carnesecca
1986	Lou Carnesecca
1993	Brian Mahoney
1999	Mike Jarvis
2025	Rick Pitino

MWBA Division I Rookie of the Year
1982	Chris Mullin
1984	Mark Jackson
1985	Walter Berry
1988	Michael Porter
1989	Malik Sealy
1995	Felipe López
1998	Ron Artest
1999	Erick Barkley
2002	Marcus Hatten
2012	Moe Harkless
2013	JaKarr Sampson
2017	Shamorie Ponds
2020	Julian Champagnie
2021	Posh Alexander
2023	AJ Storr

All-Metropolitan team selections

Year	Name	Pos.
1943	Harry Boykoff	C
1943	Larry Baxter	G/F
1943	Andrew Levane	G
1944	Dick McGuire	G
1944	Hy Gotkin	G
1945	Hy Gotkin	G
1946	Harry Boykoff	C
1949	Dick McGuire	G
1981	David Russell	F
1982	David Russell	F
1983	David Russell	F
1983	Chris Mullin	G
1984	Chris Mullin	G
1985	Chris Mullin	G
1985	Bill Wennington	C

Year	Name	Pos.
1985	Walter Berry	F
1986	Walter Berry	F
1986	Mark Jackson	G
1987	Mark Jackson	G
1990	Malik Sealy	F
1991	Malik Sealy	F
1992	Malik Sealy	F
1997	Zendon Hamilton	C
1997	Felipe Lopez	G
1998	Felipe Lopez	G
1999	Ron Artest	F
1999	Erick Barkley	G
1999	Bootsy Thornton	G
2000	Erick Barkley	G
2000	Bootsy Thornton	G

Year	Name	Pos.
2000	Lavor Postell	G/F
2001	Omar Cook	G
2002	Marcus Hatten	G
2003	Marcus Hatten	G
2005	Daryll Hill	G
2007	Lamont Hamilton	F
2008	Anthony Mason Jr.	F
2009	Paris Horne	G
2009	D.J. Kennedy	G/F
2010	D.J. Kennedy	G/F
2011	Dwight Hardy	G
2012	Moe Harkless	F
2013	D'Angelo Harrison	G
2014	D'Angelo Harrison	G
2015	D'Angelo Harrison	G

Year	Name	Pos.
2015	Sir'Dominic Pointer	G/F
2017	Shamorie Ponds	G
2018	Shamorie Ponds	G
2019	Shamorie Ponds	G
2021	Posh Alexander	G
2021	Julian Champagnie	G/F
2022	Julian Champagnie	G/F
2023	Joel Soriano	C
2024	Joel Soriano	C
2024	Daniss Jenkins	G
2025	R.J. Luis	G/F
2025	Kadary Richmond	G
2025	Zuby Ejiofor	F
2026	Zuby Ejiofor	F
2026	Bryce Hopkins	G/F

† – denotes First-Team All-Metropolitan
‡ – denotes Second-Team All-Metropolitan

== Facilities ==
St. John's at Home
Home Courts	Record	Win Pct
DeGray Gymnasium	103–65	.613
Carnesecca Arena	526–110	.827
Madison Square Garden	445–316	.585
Barclays Center	8–3	.727

* record stands after the 2023–24 season

=== DeGray Gymnasium (1932–1956) ===
DeGray Gymnasium was the original home of the St. John's Redmen when the university was located at 75 Lewis Avenue in the Bedford-Stuyvesant section of Brooklyn, NY. Their record at DeGray Gym was 156 wins to 11 losses for a winning percentage of .934. St. John's played their last home game there on December 8, 1956, with a victory of Roanoke College 103–65. When the university was transitioning from Brooklyn to Queens, the basketball team split their home games between the old Madison Square Garden and Martin Van Buren High School for five seasons.

=== Carnesecca Arena (1961–present) ===
In 1961, home games were moved to the 5,602-seat Alumni Hall on the newly constructed Queens campus opening with a 79–65 win over George Washington University. On November 23, 2004, the building and court were renamed for Hall of Fame coach Lou Carnesecca.

=== Madison Square Garden (1931–present) ===
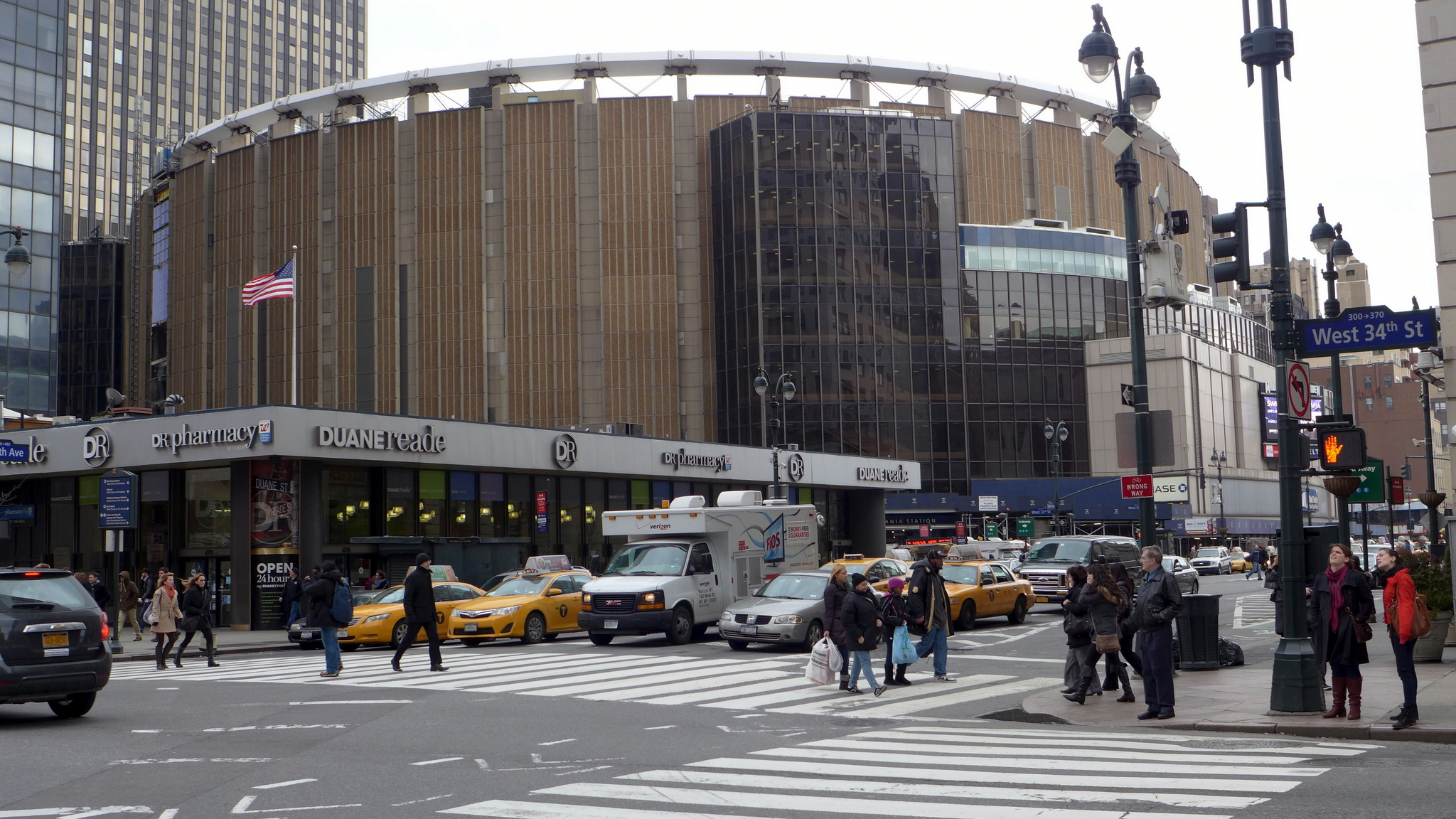
Madison Square Garden

On January 19, 1931, St. John's was a part of the first college basketball triple-header at the third Madison Square Garden on 8th Avenue and 50th Street in a charity game which saw St. John's beat CCNY by a score 17–9. St. John's has played at least one game at the old Garden on the West Side and the present Garden in Midtown every year since then, for a record 89 consecutive seasons, for both regular season home games, preseason and postseason tournaments including the Big East, NIT, and Holiday Festival.

=== Taffner Field House ===
The current training facility of the St. John's basketball team is Taffner Field House, located on the Queens campus adjacent to Carnesecca Arena. In the fall of 2005, the $16 million facility was completed with a majority of the donations coming from longtime St. John's fan, graduate, and benefactor Donald L. Taffner and his wife Eleanor Taffner, for whom the building is named. The field house features four full-size basketball courts, two for student life and two for varsity basketball, a weight room, training room, locker rooms, meeting rooms, and coaching offices for both men's and women's basketball.

== Key statistics ==
Overall
Years of basketball	110
First season	1907–08
Head coaches (all-time)	20
All Games
All-time record	1,817–999 (.645)
Home record	463–83 (.848)
20+ win seasons	40
30+ win seasons	2
Conference Games
Conference Record	694–491 (.586)
Conference regular season championships	14
Conference tournament championships	5
NCAA Tournament
NCAA Appearances	29
NCAA Tournament wins	27
Sweet Sixteens	9
Elite Eights	5
Final Fours	2
Championship Games	1
Championships	0
Accurate as of 3/22/2017. Please don't update until end of season.

Victories over AP Number 1 Teams

St. John's has five victories over the AP number one ranked team.

- Jan. 11, 1951: No. 11 St. John's 68 vs. No. 1 Bradley 59 @ Madison Square Garden
- Mar. 22, 1952: No. 10 St. John's 64 vs. No. 1 Kentucky 57 @ Reynolds Coliseum
- Jan. 2, 1965: NR St. John's 75 vs. No. 1 Michigan 74 @ Madison Square Garden
- Dec. 30, 1978: NR St. John's 69 vs. No. 1 Duke 66 @ Madison Square Garden
- Jan. 26, 1985: No. 2 St. John's 66 vs. No. 1 Georgetown 65 @ Capital Centre
- Feb. 7, 2018: NR St. John's 79 vs. No. 1 Villanova 75 @ Wells Fargo Center
