= Far Rockaway High School =

Defunct public school in New York City

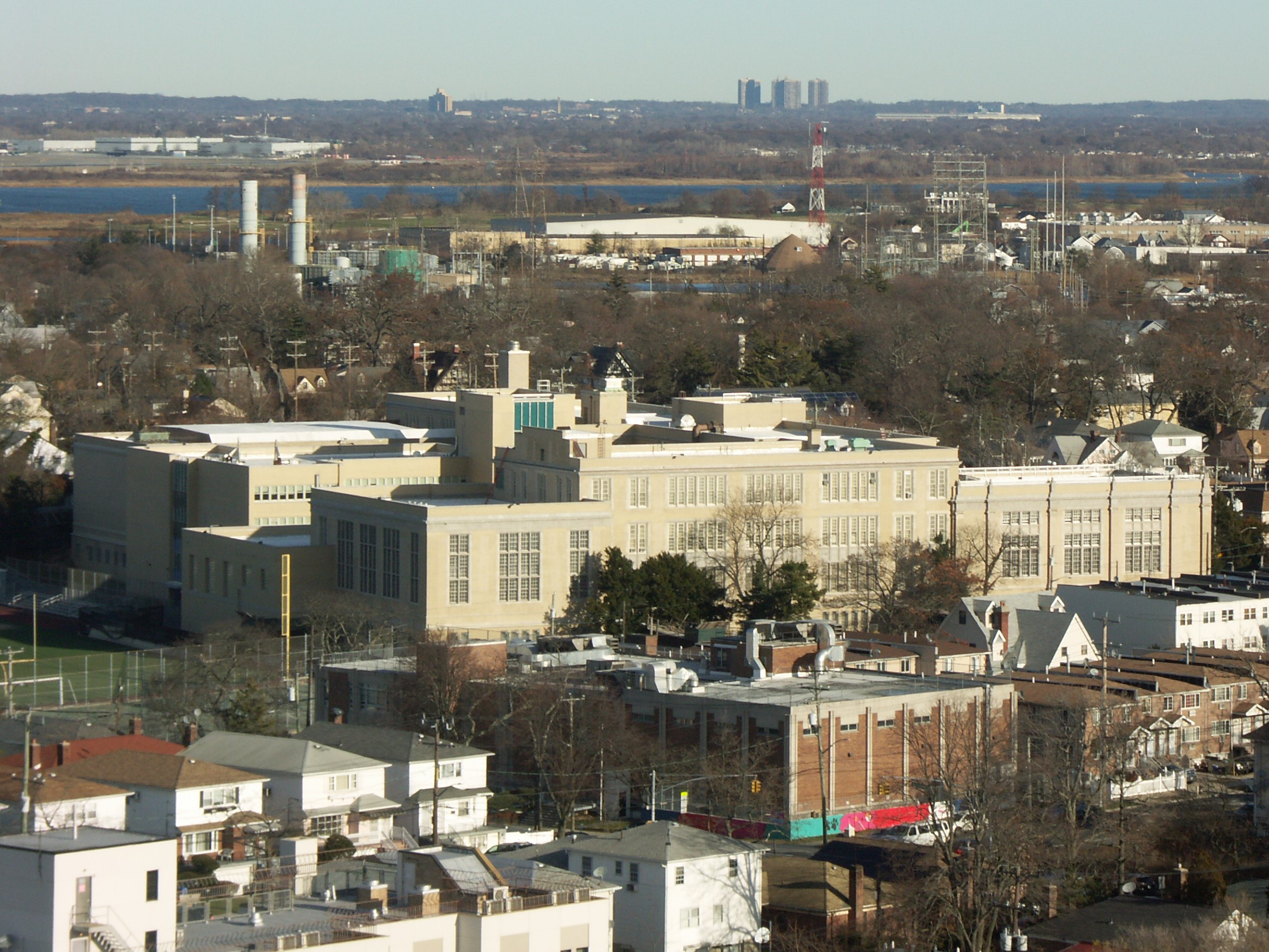
- Far Rockaway High School in November 2019.

Location
- 821 Bay 25th Street, Far Rockaway, borough of Queens; New York City, New York; United States; 40°36′05″N 73°45′46″W

Information
- Established: 1897
- Closed: 2011
- School district: New York City Department of Education
- Campus: Urban
- Website: Far Rockaway High School

Far Rockaway High School was a public high school in New York City, at 821 Bay 25th Street in Far Rockaway in the borough of Queens. It operated from 1897 to 2011. Its alumni include three Nobel Prize laureates and convicted fraudster Bernard Madoff.

The school was closed as part of a plan to stop students' average grades from declining. It stopped accepting students in 2008 and closed for good on June 27, 2011.

Its longest-serving principal was Sanford J. Ellsworth, who served for more than 40 years; its last one was Denise J. Hallett.

== History ==
The school opened in 1897 with 19 students. The first graduating class of three students received their diplomas in ceremonies held on June 21, 1899.

Until the 1919-1920 school year, Far Rockaway High School was housed within P.S. 39. In September 1921, the school superintendents decided that the school, and its 25 classes of students, would become an independent entity managed by its own principal.

A contract to construct a new building for the high school with room for 4,500 students was awarded in August 1927 to the firm of Psaty & Fuhrman, which submitted the lowest bid of $1,459,971 to the New York City Board of Education. The firm had won an earlier bid, but withdrew its offer after determining that it had underestimated its costs. The firm that had come in second in the original bidding, came in second in the rebid, and unsuccessfully sued to have its original bid accepted after Psaty & Furman withdrew its original bid. The school was nearing completion by January 1929, with costs having risen to $2.5 million, 67% over the original bid of $1.5 million. The school would be one of the largest in the nation, ready to serve 2,500 students on a campus covering a city block, with a three-story auditorium, two gymnasiums, a swimming pool and ample classroom and athletic space.

By the 2006-07 school year, the school had 945 students and 72.8 teachers (on a full-time equivalent basis), yielding a student-teacher ratio of 13.0.

In December 2007, the school announced that it would cease accepting new students for ninth grade and existing students would be allowed to graduate, after which the school would end its independent existence. The Department of Education's decision cited declining marks under its school-monitoring system as the justification behind the planned closure. The school would stop accepting students as of the 2008-09 school year and would be phased out in its entirety over a four-year period. Students in the area now attend A.M.T (school of medical technology, middle school & high school.) Frederick Douglass Academy, a high school; Q.I.R.T (Queens High School for Information, Research and Technology), a high school and Kappa VI, a middle school.

== Notable alumni ==
- Richard Bey (born 1951), radio and television talk show host.
- Baruch Samuel Blumberg (1925–2011, class of 1942), winner of the 1976 Nobel Prize in Medicine.
- Joyce Brothers (1927–2013, class of 1943), psychologist and advice columnist.
- Bonnie Bruckheimer (born 1944, class of 1962), film and television producer.
- William F. Brunner (1887–1965), Congressman.
- Richard Cohen (born 1941, class of 1958), columnist for The Washington Post.
- Richard Feynman (1918–1988), winner of the Nobel Prize in Physics in 1965 for his work on quantum electrodynamics.
- Marcus Gaither (1961–2020), professional basketball player in France and Israel, who played the guard position and led the Israel Basketball Premier League in scoring in 1989–90.
- Carl Icahn (born 1936), financier and billionaire.
- Herbert S. Klein (born 1936), historian.
- Alan M. Kriegsman (1928–2012, class of 1945), winner of a 1976 Pulitzer Prize for his work at The Washington Post, the first to win the Pulitzer Prize for Criticism for reporting as a dance critic.
- Nancy Lieberman (born 1958, class of 1976), basketball player.
- Bernard Madoff (1938–2021, class of 1956), fraudster and former stockbroker, investment advisor and financier who is the admitted operator of a Ponzi scheme considered the largest financial fraud in U.S. history, estimated to be $64.8 billion.
- Ruth Madoff (born 1941, class of 1958), wife of Ponzi scheme swindler Bernard Madoff.
- Kenneth Alan Ribet (born 1948), mathematician.
- Daniel L. Feldman (born 1949), author and politician
- Burton Richter (1931–2018), winner of the 1976 Nobel Prize in Physics.
- Alan Schriesheim (born 1930), former director and CEO of Argonne National Laboratory.
- MC Serch (born 1967 as Michael Berrin), hip hop MC and former member of 3rd Bass.
- Mel Utley (born 1953), basketball player
- Father MC (born 1967), Hip Hop Artist
- Amirah Vann (born 1980), actress
- John Warren (born 1947), former player for the New York Knicks.
- Andrew Weiss (born 1947), economist and founder of Weiss Asset Management.
