= Bill Kotsores =

American basketball player

Personal information
- Born: September 18, 1924 New York City, New York
- Died: June 6, 1971 (aged 46) Queens, New York

Career information
- High school: Andrew Jackson (Queens, New York)
- College: St. John's (1943–1945)
- Playing career: 1946–1949
- Position: Forward

Career history
- 1946–1947: Elizabeth Braves
- 1948–1949: Bridgeport Newport Steelers

Career highlights
- Third-team All-American – Converse (1944); Third-team All-American – Argosy, SN (1945); Haggerty Award winner (1945); NIT champion (1944); NIT MVP (1944)

William James Kotsores (September 18, 1924 – June 6, 1971) was an American basketball player best known for his collegiate career at St. John's University in the 1940s. He played on the school's team during the 1943–44 and 1944–45 seasons. Each year, the Red Storm advanced to the National Invitation Tournament (NIT), which at the time was considered the premier men's college basketball postseason tournament. St. John's won the NIT during Kotsores' junior year, and he was named the 1944 NIT Tournament MVP after scoring 40 points in three games. The following year, St. John's failed to repeat at NIT champions, but Kotsores was honored with the Haggerty Award. The Haggerty Award is given annually to the best male collegiate basketball player in the New York City metropolitan area every year since 1935–36. After a solid career at St. John's in which he was twice named an All-American, Kotsores played two seasons in the American Basketball League, one with the Elizabeth Braves and the other with the Bridgeport Newport Steelers. Also played enemy to Chuck Connors in an episode of the Rifleman, his daughter ( jug head) Is a friend)
