= 1944 National Invitation Tournament =

Annual NCAA basketball competition

Tournament details
- City: New York City
- Venue: Madison Square Garden
- Teams: 8

Final positions
- Champions: St. John's Redmen (2nd title)
- Runners-up: DePaul Blue Demons
- Semifinalists: Kentucky Wildcats; Oklahoma A&M Cowboys

Awards
- MVP: Bill Kotsores (St. John's)

The 1944 National Invitation Tournament was the 1944 edition of the annual NCAA college basketball competition.

== Selected teams ==
Below is a list of the 8 teams selected for the tournament.

Team	Conference
Bowling Green	Independent
Canisius	Independent
DePaul	Independent
Kentucky	Southeastern Conference
Muhlenberg	Independent
Oklahoma A&M	Missouri Valley Conference
St. John's	Metro New York Conference
Utah	Mountain States Conference

== Bracket ==
Below is the tournament bracket.

Quarterfinals
Oklahoma A&M	43
Canisius	29
DePaul	68
Muhlenberg	45
Kentucky	46
Utah	38
St. John's	44
Bowling Green	40

Semifinals
Oklahoma A&M	38
DePaul	41
Kentucky	45
St. John's	48

Finals
DePaul	39
St. John's	47

Third place game
Oklahoma A&M	29
Kentucky	45
