= Buck Freeman (basketball) =

American coach

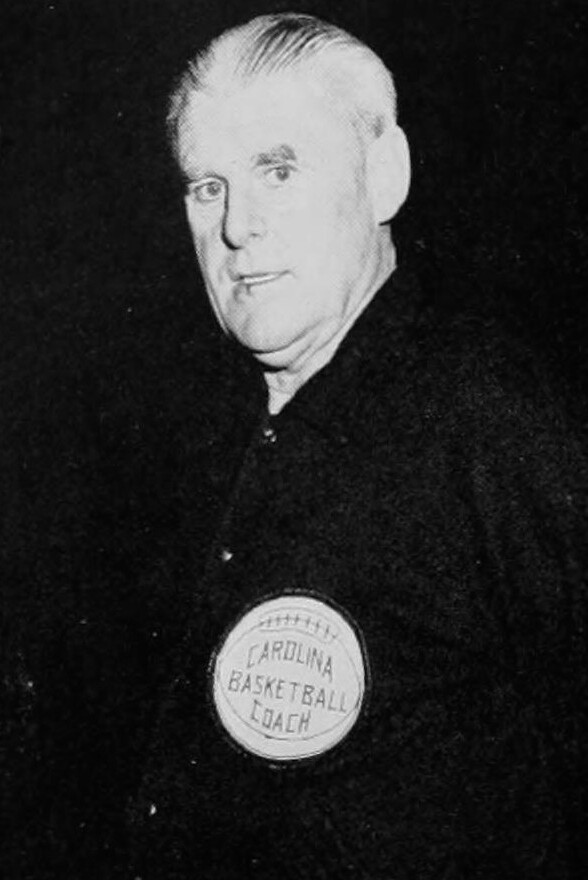
- Freeman in 1957

Biographical details
- Born: February 16, 1902; New York City, New York, U.S.
- Died: February 14, 1974 (aged 71); Columbia, South Carolina, U.S.

Playing career

Basketball
- 1924–1927: St. John's
- Positions: Center, power forward

Coaching career (HC unless noted)

Basketball
- 1927–1936: St. John's
- 1937–1938: St. Thomas (PA)
- 1938–1941: LIU (assistant)
- 1941–1945: Power Memorial Academy
- 1947–1949: Scranton
- 1949–1951: LIU (assistant)
- 1952–1961: North Carolina (assistant)
- 1964–1973: South Carolina (assistant)

Baseball
- 1928–1936: St. John's
- 1939: LIU

Football
- 1928–1938: Iona Prep

Administrative career (AD unless noted)
- 1932–1935: St. John's
- 1938: Iona Prep

Head coaching record
- Overall: 202–69 (College basketball)

James A. "Buck" Freeman (February 16, 1902 – February 14, 1974) was an American basketball coach who was head coach of the St. John's Red Storm men's basketball team from 1927 to 1936.

== Career ==
Freeman played forward and center for St. John's basketball team. After graduating in 1927, he became the team's head coach. From 1927 to 1931, he coached the "Wonder Five" of Matty Begovich, Mac Kinsbrunner, Max Posnack, Allie Schuckman, and Jack "Rip" Gerson. The group compiled a 88–8 record and led the university to national prominence. He also served as the school's baseball coach and athletic director. He resigned unexpectedly in 1936 without giving a reason.

In 1937, Freeman became basketball head coach at St. Thomas College (now known as the University of Scranton). He left the school after one season to become athletic director at Iona Preparatory School, where he had coached football since 1928. In 1938, he became an assistant basketball coach at Long Island University. He succeeded Clair Bee as the school's baseball coach the following spring. In 1941, he became head basketball coach at Power Memorial Academy. In 1947, Freeman returned to the University of Scranton following the in-season resignation of John "Les" Dickman. He resigned after two losing seasons and rejoined the athletic staff at LIU, where he remained until the school dropped its basketball program in 1951 following a point shaving scandal.

Freeman served as an assistant coach under Frank McGuire at the University of North Carolina and University of South Carolina. McGuire had wanted to hire Freeman when he became head coach at St. John's in 1947, but the school's administration refused due to Freeman's chronic alcoholism. McGuire instead used Freeman as a scout. He called Freeman "the best assistant coach in the business" and gave him much of the credit for the success of the Tar Heels national championship team. In between his stints at the two schools, Freeman was a scout for the Houston Colt 45s.

Freeman resigned after the 1972–73 season, but remained involved with the South Carolina program as a consultant and adviser. He died on February 14, 1974 at Providence Hospital in Columbia, South Carolina.

== Head coaching record ==
=== College basketball ===
Record table
Season	Team	Overall	Conference	Standing	Postseason
St. John's Redmen (Independent) (1927–1933)
1927–28	St. John's	18–4			
1928–29	St. John's	23–2			
1929–30	St. John's	23–1			
1930–31	St. John's	21–1			
1931–32	St. John's	22–4			
1932–33	St. John's	23–4			
St. John's Redmen (Metropolitan New York Conference) (1933–1936)
1933–34	St. John's	16–3	3–4	5th	
1934–35	St. John's	13–8			
1935–36	St. John's	18–4	4–3	4th	
St. John's:		177–31			
St. Thomas Tommies (Independent) (1937–1938)
1937–38	St. Thomas	12–9			
Scranton Royals (Independent) (1947–1949)
1946–47	Scranton	9–12			
1947–48	Scranton	7–20			
1948–49	Scranton	9–16			
St. Thomas/Scranton:		25–38			
Total:		202–69			
