= 1945 National Invitation Tournament =

Annual NCAA basketball competition

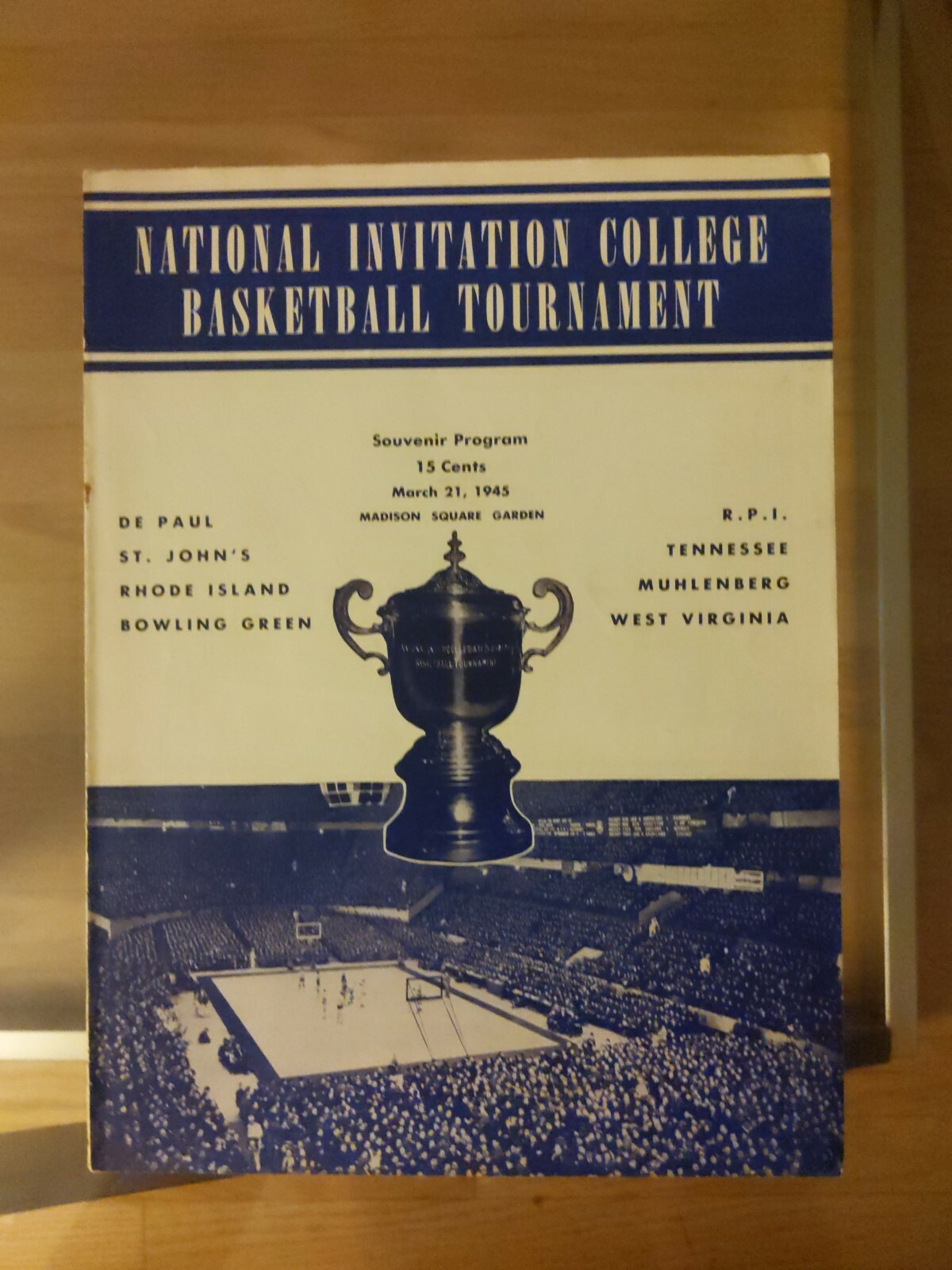

Tournament details
- City: New York City
- Venue: Madison Square Garden
- Teams: 8

Final positions
- Champions: DePaul Blue Demons (1st title)
- Runners-up: Bowling Green Falcons
- Semifinalists: St. John's Redmen; Rhode Island Rams

Awards
- MVP: George Mikan (DePaul)

The 1945 National Invitation Tournament was the 1945 edition of the annual NCAA college basketball competition.

== Selected teams ==
Below is a list of the eight teams selected for the tournament.

- Bowling Green
- DePaul
- Muhlenberg
- RPI
- Rhode Island
- St. John's
- Tennessee
- West Virginia

== Bracket ==
Below is the tournament bracket.

Quarterfinals
Rhode Island	51
Tennessee	44
DePaul	76
West Virginia	52
Bowling Green	60
RPI	45
St. John's	34
Muhlenberg	33

Semifinals
Rhode Island	53
DePaul	97
Bowling Green	57
St. John's	44

Finals
DePaul	71
Bowling Green	54

Third place game
Rhode Island	57
St. John's	64

== See also ==
- 1945 NCAA basketball tournament
- 1945 NAIA Basketball Tournament
