= 1942–43 NCAA men's basketball season =

Men's collegiate basketball season

- NCAA Tournament: 1943
- Tournament dates: March 24 – 30, 1943
- National Championship: Madison Square Garden; New York City, New York
- NCAA Champions: Wyoming Cowboys
- Helms National Champions: Wyoming Cowboys
- Other champions: St. John's Redmen (NIT)
- Player of the Year (Helms): George Senesky, Saint Joseph's Hawks (retroactive selection in 1944)

The 1942–43 NCAA men's basketball season began in December 1942, progressed through the regular season and conference tournaments, and concluded with the 1943 NCAA basketball tournament championship game on March 30, 1943, at Madison Square Garden in New York City, New York. The Wyoming Cowboys won their first NCAA national championship with a 46–34 victory over the Georgetown Hoyas.

== Rule changes ==
In overtime, a player can commit a fifth foul before fouling out. Previously, a player fouled out after committing four fouls, regardless of whether the game went into overtime or not.

== Season headlines ==
- In February 1943, the Helms Athletic Foundation retroactively selected its national champions for the seasons from 1919–20 through 1941–42. Beginning with the 1942–43 season, it began to pick each season's national champion annually, a practice it continued through the 1981–82 season.
- Top-ranked Illinois declined to participate in either the NCAA tournament or the National Invitation Tournament after three of its starters were drafted into the United States Army for World War II service.
- The 1943 NCAA Tournament championship game between Wyoming and Georgetown was the only one in history not filmed for posterity. It had a smaller crowd than expected because of the greater local interest in New York City in the championship run St. John's made in the 1943 National Invitation Tournament. Until at least the mid-1950s, the NIT was the more prestigious of the two tournaments.
- As a fundraiser for the American Red Cross, the finalists and semifinalists of the NCAA Tournament and NIT took part in the Sportswriters Invitational Playoff, in which the two tournament champions, Wyoming (NCAA) and St. John's (NIT), and the two runners-up, Georgetown (NCAA) and Toledo (NIT), played each other at Madison Square Garden after their tournaments ended, with the games counting in the teams' records for the season. The NCAA Tournament teams prevailed in both games: Wyoming beat St. John's 52–47 with 18,000 fans in attendance, and the Hoyas defeated Toledo 54–40 to close out the season. The post-tournament benefit games — touted as the "mythical national championship" between the two tournament winners — would be played again in each of the next two seasons.
- With a final record of 31–2, Wyoming became the first team to win 30 or more games in a single season.
- In 1995, the Premo-Porretta Power Poll retroactively selected Illinois as its top-ranked team for the 1942–43 season.

== Conference membership changes ==
School	Former conference	New conference
Hofstra Flying Dutchmen	Non-major basketball program	Metropolitan New York Conference

== Regular season ==
=== Conferences ===
==== Conference winners and tournaments ====
Conference	Regular season winner	Conference player of the year	Conference tournament	Tournament venue (City)	Tournament winner
Big Six Conference	Kansas	None selected	No Tournament		
Big Ten Conference	Illinois	None selected	No Tournament		
Border Conference	West Texas State	None selected	No Tournament		
Eastern Intercollegiate Basketball League	Dartmouth	None selected	No Tournament		
Metropolitan New York Conference	St. John's		No Tournament		
Missouri Valley Conference	Creighton	None selected	No Tournament		
New England Conference	Rhode Island State		No Tournament		
Pacific Coast Conference	Washington (North); USC (South)		No Tournament; Washington defeated USC in best-of-three conference championship playoff series		
Mountain States (Skyline) Conference	Wyoming		No Tournament		
Southeastern Conference	Tennessee	None selected	1943 SEC men's basketball tournament	Jefferson County Armory, (Louisville, Kentucky)	Tennessee
Southern Conference	Duke	None selected	1943 Southern Conference men's basketball tournament	Thompson Gym (Raleigh, North Carolina)	George Washington
Southwest Conference	Rice & Texas	None selected	No Tournament		

==== Conference standings ====
1942–43 Big Six Conference men's basketball standings
	Conf.				Overall
Team	W		L	PCT	W		L	PCT
Kansas	10	–	0	1.000	22	–	6	.786
Missouri	7	–	3	.700	18	–	9	.667
Oklahoma	5	–	5	.500	7	–	10	.412
Nebraska	5	–	5	.500	6	–	10	.375
Iowa State	2	–	8	.200	7	–	9	.438
Kansas State	1	–	9	.100	6	–	14	.300

1942–43 Big Ten Conference men's basketball standings
	Conf.				Overall
Team	W		L	PCT	W		L	PCT
Illinois	12	–	0	1.000	17	–	1	.944
Indiana	11	–	2	.846	18	–	2	.900
Northwestern	7	–	5	.583	8	–	9	.471
Wisconsin	6	–	6	.500	12	–	9	.571
Purdue	6	–	6	.500	9	–	11	.450
Minnesota	5	–	7	.417	8	–	9	.471
Ohio State	5	–	7	.417	8	–	9	.471
Michigan	4	–	8	.333	10	–	8	.556
Iowa	3	–	9	.250	7	–	10	.412
Chicago	0	–	9	.000	0	–	21	.000

1942–43 Border Conference men's basketball standings
	Conf.				Overall
Team	W		L	PCT	W		L	PCT
West Texas State	10	–	0	1.000	15	–	7	.682
Arizona	11	–	1	.917	22	–	2	.917
Texas Tech	7	–	5	.583	13	–	11	.542
Texas State M&M	4	–	4	.500	11	–	6	.647
Arizona State–Tempe	6	–	6	.500	10	–	9	.526
Arizona State–Flagstaff	1	–	7	.125	4	–	8	.333
New Mexico	1	–	11	.083	3	–	17	.150
Hardin–Simmons	0	–	6	.000	1	–	9	.100

1942–43 Eastern Intercollegiate Basketball League standings
	Conf.				Overall
Team	W		L	PCT	W		L	PCT
Dartmouth	11	–	1	.917	20	–	3	.870
Princeton	9	–	3	.750	14	–	6	.700
Pennsylvania	6	–	6	.500	14	–	7	.667
Cornell	6	–	6	.500	7	–	15	.318
Columbia	5	–	7	.417	8	–	8	.500
Harvard	4	–	8	.333	12	–	14	.462
Yale	1	–	11	.083	6	–	17	.261

1942–43 Metropolitan New York Conference men's basketball standings
	Conf.				Overall
Team	W		L	PCT	W		L	PCT
St. John's	6	–	1	.857	21	–	3	.875
Manhattan	5	–	2	.714	18	–	3	.857
Fordham	4	–	2	.667	16	–	6	.727
NYU	3	–	2	.600	16	–	6	.727
Hofstra	3	–	2	.600	15	–	6	.714
CCNY	2	–	5	.286	8	–	10	.444
St. Francis (NY)	1	–	5	.167	13	–	7	.650
Brooklyn	0	–	5	.000	6	–	11	.353

1942–43 Missouri Valley Conference men's basketball standings
	Conf.				Overall
Team	W		L	PCT	W		L	PCT
Creighton	10	–	0	1.000	19	–	2	.905
Oklahoma A&M	7	–	3	.700	14	–	10	.583
Washington University	7	–	3	.700	9	–	10	.474
Saint Louis	3	–	7	.300	11	–	10	.524
Drake	3	–	7	.300	8	–	9	.471
Tulsa	0	–	10	.000	0	–	10	.000

1942–43 Mountain States Conference men's basketball standings
	Conf.				Overall
Team	W		L	PCT	W		L	PCT
Wyoming	4	–	0	1.000	31	–	2	.939
BYU	7	–	1	.875	15	–	7	.682
Utah State	4	–	4	.500	14	–	7	.667
Utah	1	–	7	.125	10	–	12	.455
Colorado State	0	–	4	.000	7	–	9	.438

1942–43 New England Conference men's basketball standings
	Conf.				Overall
Team	W		L	PCT	W		L	PCT
Rhode Island State	7	–	1	.875	16	–	3	.842
Connecticut	5	–	3	.625	8	–	7	.533
Maine	4	–	4	.500	9	–	6	.600
Northeastern	2	–	6	.250	7	–	12	.368
New Hampshire	2	–	6	.250	4	–	14	.222

1942–43 Pacific Coast Conference men's basketball standings
	Conf.				Overall
Team	W		L	PCT	W		L	PCT
North
Washington †	12	–	4	.750	24	–	7	.774
Oregon	10	–	6	.625	19	–	10	.655
Washington State	9	–	7	.563	19	–	11	.633
Oregon State	8	–	8	.500	19	–	9	.679
Idaho	1	–	15	.063	14	–	20	.412
South
USC	7	–	1	.875	23	–	5	.821
UCLA	4	–	4	.500	14	–	7	.667
Stanford	4	–	4	.500	10	–	11	.476
California	1	–	7	.125	9	–	15	.375
† Conference playoff series winner

1942–43 Rocky Mountain Conference men's basketball standings
	Conf.				Overall
Team	W		L	PCT	W		L	PCT
Colorado State–Greeley	5	–	3	.625	8	–	8	.500
Colorado College	4	–	4	.500	11	–	7	.611
Colorado Mines	3	–	5	.375	6	–	12	.333

1942–43 Southeastern Conference men's basketball standings
	Conf.				Overall
Team	W		L	PCT	W		L	PCT
Kentucky	8	–	1	.889	17	–	6	.739
LSU	11	–	2	.846	18	–	4	.818
Tennessee †	6	–	3	.667	14	–	4	.778
Mississippi State	13	–	7	.650	14	–	8	.636
Georgia Tech	7	–	4	.636	11	–	5	.688
Vanderbilt	9	–	7	.563	10	–	8	.556
Alabama	9	–	9	.500	10	–	10	.500
Ole Miss	6	–	8	.429	8	–	10	.444
Tulane	4	–	8	.333	4	–	9	.308
Georgia	1	–	8	.111	4	–	13	.235
Auburn	1	–	12	.077	1	–	14	.067
Florida	0	–	6	.000	8	–	7	.533
† Regular-season championship and SEC Tournament winner

1942–43 Southern Conference men's basketball standings
	Conf.				Overall
Team	W		L	PCT	W		L	PCT
Duke	12	–	1	.923	20	–	6	.769
George Washington †	8	–	2	.800	17	–	6	.739
South Carolina	6	–	3	.667	13	–	6	.684
Davidson	7	–	4	.636	18	–	6	.750
The Citadel	5	–	3	.625	8	–	5	.615
William & Mary	6	–	4	.600	11	–	10	.524
VMI	7	–	5	.583	8	–	8	.500
North Carolina State	7	–	5	.583	7	–	9	.438
Maryland	5	–	5	.500	8	–	8	.500
Richmond	4	–	4	.500	11	–	5	.688
North Carolina	8	–	9	.471	12	–	10	.545
Virginia Tech	3	–	6	.333	7	–	7	.500
Washington and Lee	2	–	10	.167	7	–	12	.368
Wake Forest	1	–	10	.091	1	–	10	.091
Clemson	0	–	10	.000	3	–	13	.188
† Southern Conference Tournament winner

1942–43 Southwest Conference men's basketball standings
	Conf.				Overall
Team	W		L	PCT	W		L	PCT
Texas	9	–	3	.750	19	–	7	.731
Rice	9	–	3	.750	17	–	9	.654
Arkansas	8	–	4	.667	19	–	7	.731
TCU	5	–	7	.417	18	–	9	.667
SMU	4	–	8	.333	10	–	8	.556
Texas A&M	4	–	8	.333	11	–	11	.500
Baylor	3	–	9	.250	6	–	14	.300

=== Major independents ===
A total of 60 college teams played as major independents. Villanova (19–2) had the best winning percentage (.905) and Western Kentucky State (24–3) finished with the most wins.

1942–43 NCAA men's basketball independents standings
	Conf.				Overall
Team	W		L	PCT	W		L	PCT
Villanova		–		–	19	–	2	.905
Notre Dame		–		–	18	–	2	.900
Seton Hall		–		–	16	–	2	.889
Western Kentucky State		–		–	24	–	3	.889
Akron		–		–	18	–	3	.857
Rochester (N.Y.)		–		–	12	–	2	.857
Toledo		–		–	22	–	4	.846
St. Joseph's		–		–	18	–	4	.818
Georgetown		–		–	22	–	5	.815
DePaul		–		–	19	–	5	.792
Penn State		–		–	15	–	4	.789
Western Michigan		–		–	15	–	4	.789
Bowling Green State		–		–	18	–	5	.783
Washington & Jefferson		–		–	18	–	5	.783
Nevada		–		–	14	–	4	.778
Montana State		–		–	17	–	5	.773
Valparaiso		–		–	17	–	5	.773
Niagara		–		–	20	–	6	.769
Indiana State		–		–	13	–	4	.765
Detroit		–		–	15	–	5	.750
Denver		–		–	19	–	8	.704
Miami (Ohio)		–		–	11	–	5	.688
LIU		–		–	13	–	6	.684
Siena		–		–	13	–	6	.684
Pittsburgh		–		–	10	–	5	.667
West Virginia		–		–	14	–	7	.667
Duquesne		–		–	12	–	7	.632
Wichita Municipal		–		–	12	–	7	.632
Montana		–		–	15	–	9	.625
Muhlenberg		–		–	13	–	8	.619
Ohio		–		–	11	–	7	.611
San Francisco		–		–	13	–	9	.591
Marshall		–		–	10	–	7	.588
Saint Mary's		–		–	12	–	9	.571
La Salle		–		–	13	–	10	.565
Canisius		–		–	11	–	9	.550
Loyola (Ill.)		–		–	12	–	10	.545
Lafayette		–		–	7	–	6	.538
Dayton		–		–	9	–	8	.529
Santa Clara		–		–	10	–	9	.526
Kent State		–		–	12	–	12	.500
Temple		–		–	11	–	11	.500
Cincinnati		–		–	9	–	10	.474
Marquette		–		–	9	–	10	.474
St. Bonaventure		–		–	8	–	9	.471
Brown		–		–	9	–	11	.450
Syracuse		–		–	8	–	10	.444
Rutgers		–		–	7	–	9	.438
Geneva		–		–	9	–	12	.429
Navy		–		–	6	–	8	.429
Bradley		–		–	8	–	11	.421
Colgate		–		–	5	–	7	.417
Bucknell		–		–	5	–	8	.385
Virginia		–		–	8	–	13	.381
Xavier		–		–	6	–	10	.375
Army		–		–	5	–	10	.333
Lehigh		–		–	5	–	10	.333
Loyola (Md.)		–		–	7	–	14	.333
Butler		–		–	4	–	9	.308
Boston University		–		–	3	–	10	.231
Loyola (Calif.)		–		–	3	–	10	.231
Holy Cross		–		–	1	–	5	.167
Michigan State		–		–	2	–	14	.125

=== Informal championships ===
Conference	Regular season winner	Conference tournament	Tournament venue (City)	Tournament winner
Middle Three Conference	Rutgers	No Tournament		

NOTE: Despite its name, the Middle Three Conference was an informal scheduling alliance rather than a true conference, and its members played as independents. In play among the three member schools in 1942–43, Rutgers finished with a 3–1 record and Lafayette with a 2–2 record, while Lehigh had record of 1–3.

== Post-season tournaments ==
=== NCAA tournament ===
==== Semifinals and final ====
National semifinals
Georgetown	53
DePaul	49
Texas	54
Wyoming	58

National Final
Georgetown	34
Wyoming	46

=== National Invitation tournament ===
==== Semifinals and finals ====
Semifinals
St. John's	69
Fordham	43
Toledo	46
Washington & Jefferson	39

Finals
St. John's	48
Toledo	27
Third place
Fordham	34
Washington & Jefferson	39

== Awards ==
=== Consensus All-American teams ===
Consensus First Team
Player	Class	Team
Ed Beisser	Senior	Creighton
Charles B. Black	Sophomore	Kansas
Harry Boykoff	Sophomore	St. John's
Bill Closs	Senior	Rice
Andy Phillip	Junior	Illinois
Kenny Sailors	Junior	Wyoming
George Senesky	Senior	Saint Joseph's

Consensus Second Team
Player	Class	Team
Gale Bishop	Junior	Washington State
Otto Graham	Junior	Northwestern
John Kotz	Senior	Wisconsin
Robert Rensberger	Senior	Notre Dame
Gene Rock	Junior	Southern California
Gerry Tucker	Junior	Oklahoma

=== Major player of the year awards ===
- Helms Player of the Year: George Senesky, Saint Joseph's (retroactive selection in 1944)
- Sporting News Player of the Year: Andy Phillip, Illinois

=== Other major awards ===
- NIT/Haggerty Award (Top player in New York City metro area): Andrew Levane, St. John's

== Coaching changes ==
A number of teams changed coaches during the season and after it ended.

Team	Former Coach	Interim Coach	New Coach	Reason
Army	Valentine Lentz		Ed Kelleher	
Baylor	Bill Henderson		Van Sweet	
Bucknell	John Sitarsky		J. Ellwood Ludwig	
The Citadel	Bo Sherman		Ben Clemons	
Columbia	Cliff Battles		Elmer Ripley	
Dartmouth	Osborne Cowles		Earl Brown	
Denver	Ellison Ketchum	Mark Duncan	Art Quinlan	
Drake	Evan O. Williams		Bill Easton	
Georgetown	Elmer Ripley		None	After the end of the season, Georgetown suspended all athletic programs for the duration of World War II Ripley moved to the head coaching position at Columbia.
Georgia Tech	Roy Mundorff		Dwight Keith	
Harvard	Earl Brown		Floyd Stahl	
Indiana	Branch McCracken	Harry Good		
Kansas State	Chili Cochrane		Cliff Rock	
La Salle	Obie O'Brien		Joseph Meehan	
Lehigh	James Gordon		Leo Prendergast	
Montana	Clyde Carpenter & Ed Chinske		Ed Buzzetti	
New Mexico	Willis Barnes		George White	
Notre Dame	George Keogan		Moose Krause	
Penn	Lon Jourdet		Red Kellett	
Princeton	Franklin Cappon		William Logan	
South Carolina	Rex Enright		Henry Findley	
Tulsa	Mike Milligan		Woody West	
Vanderbilt	Norm Cooper		Smokey Harper	
VMI	Allison Hubert		Joe Daher	
West Virginia	Rudy Baric		Harry Lothes	
William & Mary	Dwight Stuessy		Rube McCray	
