= 1942–43 DePaul Blue Demons men's basketball team =

American college basketball season

1942–43 DePaul Blue Demons men's basketball
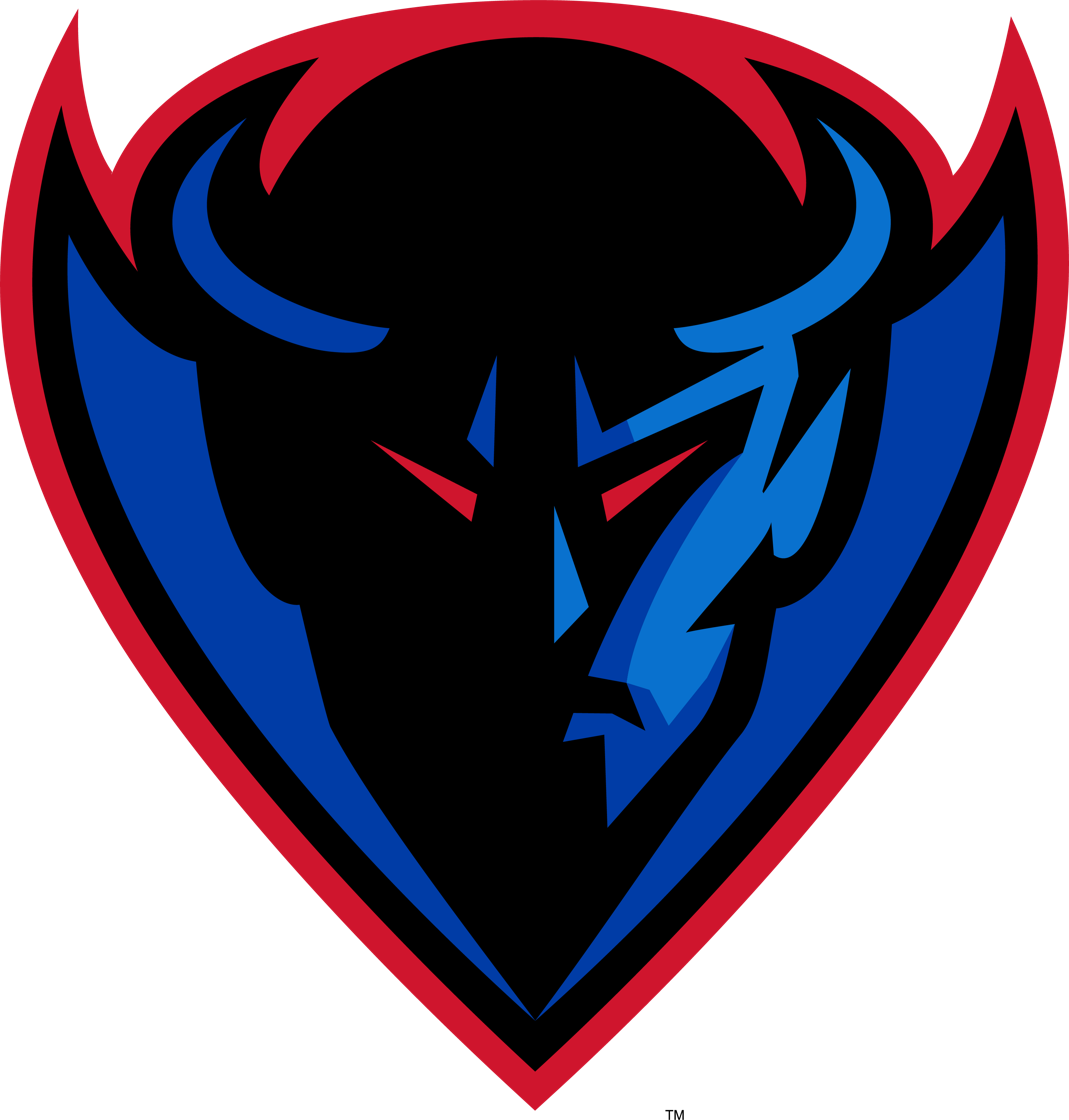

NCAA tournament, Final Four
- Conference: Independent
- Record: 19–5
- Head coach: Ray Meyer (1st season)
- Home arena: University Auditorium

The 1942–43 DePaul Blue Demons men's basketball team represented DePaul University during the 1942–43 NCAA men's basketball season. They were led by head coach Ray Meyer, in the first season of his legendary career, and played their home games at the University Auditorium in Chicago. The Blue Demons were one of eight teams invited to take part in the NCAA tournament. DePaul defeated Dartmouth, a team that reached the Final Four the season before, before losing to Georgetown in the National semifinal round. They finished the season with an overall record of 19–5.

== Roster ==
1942–43 DePaul Blue Demons men's basketball team
Players
Coaches

Pos.	#	Name	Height	Weight	Year	Previous school	Hometown
	23	Mel Frailey	—	—
G	25	Tony Kelly (C)	—	—	Sr
	27	Bill Ryan	—	—
	96	John Jorgenson	—	—
C	99	George Mikan	6 ft 10 in (2.08 m)	235 lb (107 kg)	Fr	Joliet Catholic	Joliet, Illinois

Head coach

- Ray Meyer (Notre Dame)

Assistant coach(es)

Legend

- (C) Team captain
- (S) Suspended
- (I) Ineligible
- (W) Walk-on
- Injured
- Current redshirt

== Schedule and results ==
Date time, TV	Opponent	Result	Record	Site city, state
Regular season
Feb 20, 1943*	Kentucky	W 53–44		Chicago Stadium (16,000); Chicago, Illinois
NCAA Tournament
Mar 24, 1943*	vs. Dartmouth; East Regional Semifinal / National Quarterfinal – Elite Eight	W 46–35	19–4	Madison Square Garden; New York, New York
Mar 25, 1943*	vs. Georgetown; East Regional Final / National Semifinal – Final Four	L 49–53	19–5	Madison Square Garden (14,085); New York, New York
*Non-conference game. ^{#}Rankings from AP Poll. (#) Tournament seedings in parentheses. E=East.
