= Lew Roney =

American basketball player

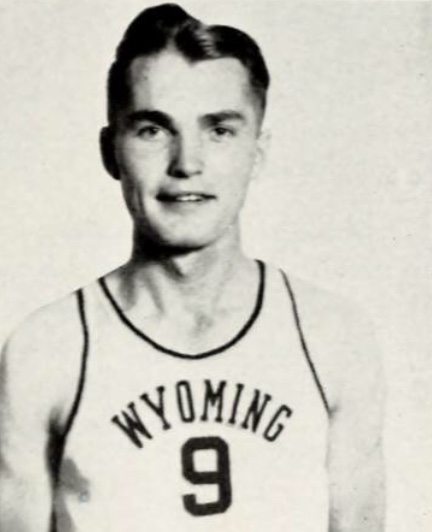
- Roney from the 1943 Wyo

Personal information
- Born: July 7, 1922 Powell, Wyoming, U.S.
- Died: September 28, 2004 (aged 82) Cheyenne, Wyoming, U.S.
- Listed height: 6 ft 3 in (1.91 m)

Career information
- High school: Powell (Powell, Wyoming)
- College: Wyoming (1941–1943, 1946–1947)
- Position: Guard

Career highlights
- NCAA champion (1943)

Lewis A. Roney (July 7, 1922 – September 28, 2004) was an American college basketball player. He was a starting guard for the Wyoming Cowboys' 1943 National Championship team and later a teacher and coach.

Roney, a 6'3 guard who grew up on a dairy farm in Powell, Wyoming, played for the Cowboys from 1941 to 1943, then returned to the Cowboys for the 1946–47 season after a stint in the United States Navy during World War II. Roney served in the Pacific for his World War II tour of duty. During the Cowboys' championship year, coach Everett Shelton credited the insertion of the energetic Roney into the starting lineup as one of the keys to the team's success that year.

After the close of his collegiate career, Roney became a teacher and coach in Laramie, Wyoming. His son, Lew played basketball at Yale, where he earned a BS in engineering, and then earned a masters math at Wyoming, before moving to Cheyenne and becoming a coach and math instructor at Cheyenne Central High School. His father, Lew Roney was inducted into the University of Wyoming athletics hall of fame as a member of the 1943 national championship team in 1993.
