= 1942–43 Baylor Bears basketball team =

American college basketball season

1942–43 Baylor Bears men's basketball
- Conference: Southwest Conference
- Record: 6-14 (3-9 SWC)
- Head coach: Bill Henderson

1942–43 Southwest Conference men's basketball standings
	Conf.				Overall
Team	W		L	PCT	W		L	PCT
Texas	9	–	3	.750	19	–	7	.731
Rice	9	–	3	.750	17	–	9	.654
Arkansas	8	–	4	.667	19	–	7	.731
TCU	5	–	7	.417	18	–	9	.667
SMU	4	–	8	.333	10	–	8	.556
Texas A&M	4	–	8	.333	11	–	11	.500
Baylor	3	–	9	.250	6	–	14	.300

The 1942-43 Baylor Bears basketball team represented the Baylor University during the 1942-43 college men's basketball season.

== Schedule ==
Date time, TV	Opponent	Result	Record	Site city, state
*	Southeastern Oklahoma St.	L 30-40	0-1	Waco, TX
*	West Texas State	W 51-47	1-1	Oklahoma City, OK
*	Rice	L 26-42	1-2	Oklahoma City, OK
*	East Texas State	W 34-33	2-2	Waco, TX
	at TCU	L 31-35	2-3	Fort Worth, TX
	Texas	L 35-41	2-4	Waco, TX
	Texas A&M	W 66-58	3-4	Waco, TX
	at SMU	L 44-71	3-5	Dallas, TX
*	East Texas State	W 35-33	4-5	Waco, TX
*	Waco AFB	W 39-35	5-5	Waco, TX
	at Texas A&M	L 38-51	5-6	College Station, TX
	Rice	L 34-36	5-7	Waco, TX
	at Arkansas	L 25-68	5-8	Fayetteville, AR
	at Arkansas	L 38-40	5-9	Fayetteville, AR
	TCU	W 50-41	6-9	Waco, TX
	at Rice	L 36-53	6-10	Houston, TX
*	Corpus Christi NAS	L 23-54	6-11	Waco, TX
*	Corpus Christi NAS	L 24-48	6-12	Waco, TX
	SMU	L 50-65	6-13	Waco, TX
	at Texas	L 55-57	6-14	Austin, TX
*Non-conference game. (#) Tournament seedings in parentheses.
