= Bully Gilstrap =

American basketball and football coach

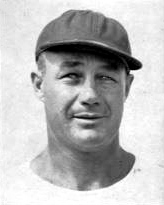
- Gilstrap from the 1943 Cactus

Biographical details
- Born: August 31, 1901; Taylor, Texas, U.S.
- Died: January 4, 1989 (aged 87); Rosebud, Texas, U.S.
- Education: The University of Texas at Austin

Playing career

Football
- 1921–1923: Texas

Basketball
- 1921–1922: Texas

Track and field
- 1922–1923: Texas

Coaching career (HC unless noted)

Football
- 1925–1936: Schreiner
- 1937–1956: Texas (assistant)

Basketball
- 1942–1945: Texas

Head coaching record
- Overall: 43–28 (basketball)
- Tournaments: 1–1 (NCAA)

Accomplishments and honors

Championships
- Texas State Juco Football Championship (1936); SWC regular season (1943)

Awards
- 1923 Southwest Conference Javelin Championship; 1923 Southwest Conference Track Championship

Howard Clifford "Bully" Gilstrap (August 31, 1901 – January 4, 1989) was an American college basketball and college football coach and athlete. He was the head coach of the Texas basketball program from 1942 to 1945 and took them to their first NCAA Final Four appearance in 1943. That season he coached the Longhorns to a 43–28 record.

Before going into coaching, Gilstrap was an athlete at Texas, lettering in football (1921–23), basketball (1922) and track and field (1922–23). In 1921, as an end, he led the team in scoring with 8 touchdowns. In 1922 he was awarded the Bellmont Cup as Texas' outstanding track and field athlete. In 1923 he was a member of the first Texas football team to beat A&M at Kyle Field, won the Southwest Conference Championship in the javelin and helped the team win the SWC track title. He graduated in 1924.

In 1925 he became the Athletic Director at Schreiner Institute in Kerrville, Texas, which was then an-all boys military junior college. He was also the head coach for football, basketball, and track during his time as director. In 1926 he led the team to a 10-0 record, defeating teams like Texas Tech, St. Mary's, Sul Ross and McMurray; in 1929 he led them to another undefeated season going 9-0-1; and in 1935 he led them to the state junior college championship.

In 1937, Gilstrap returned to Texas to serve as an assistant coach on the Longhorns football team. He held that job for 20 seasons, under coaches Dana X. Bible, Blair Cherry and Ed Price from 1937 through 1956 and helped the team win six SWC titles and six bowl victories - including four Cotton Bowls.

While an assistant coach with the football team, he also served as the basketball coach for 3 seasons, starting in 1943, when Jack Gray went to fight in World War II. He led the team to the Southwest Conference Championship and the NCAA Tournament in his first year, taking them to their first Final Four appearance. He stepped away in when Gray returned in 1945.

He left coaching in 1956 but continued to teach at Texas into the mid-1970's. He was inducted into the University of Texas Athletics Hall of Honor in 1968 for his contributions as a player and a coach. He was also inducted into the Schreiner Hall of Honor as a faculty honoree.

He died of a self-inflicted gunshot wound at his farm near Rosebud, Texas on January 4, 1989.

Gilstrap was the brother of Claude "Chena" Gilstrap, head football coach and athletic director at Texas-Arlington.

== Head coaching record ==
=== Football ===
Year	Team	Overall	Conference	Standing	Bowl/playoffs
Schreiner Institute () (1925–1936)
1925	Schreiner Institute	1-0			
1926	Schreiner Institute	10-0			
1927	Schreiner Institute				
1928	Schreiner Institute	1-1			
1929	Schreiner Institute	9-0-1			
1930	Schreiner Institute	0-1			
1931	Schreiner Institute	2-0			
1932	Schreiner Institute	0-1			
1933	Schreiner Institute	0-3			
1934	Schreiner Institute	1-1			
1935	Schreiner Institute	1-0			
1936	Schreiner Institute	1-0			
Schreiner Institute:		26-7-1			
Total:		26-7-1			

=== Basketball ===
Record table
Season	Team	Overall	Conference	Standing	Postseason
Texas Longhorns (Southwest Conference) (1942–1945)
1942–43	Texas	19–7	9–3	T–1st	NCAA Final Four
1943–44	Texas	14–11	6–6	T–3rd	
1944–45	Texas	10–10	5–7	5th	
Texas:		43–28 (.606)	20–16 (.556)		
Total:		43–28 (.606)			
National champion Postseason invitational champion Conference regular season champion Conference regular season and conference tournament champion Division regular season champion Division regular season and conference tournament champion Conference tournament champion

== See also ==
- List of NCAA Division I Men's Final Four appearances by coach
