= Jim Weir (basketball) =

American basketball player

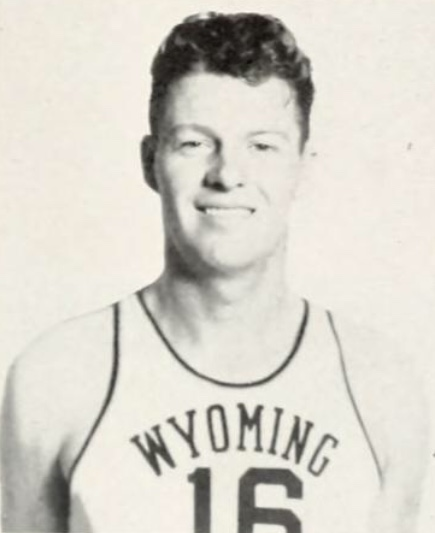
- Weir from the 1943 Wyo

Personal information
- Listed height: 6 ft 6 in (1.98 m)

Career information
- High school: Green River (Green River, Wyoming)
- College: Wyoming (1941–1946)
- Position: Forward
- Number: 16

Career highlights
- NCAA champion (1943)

James Weir was an American college basketball player. He was a starting forward for the Wyoming Cowboys' 1943 National Championship team and was an All-American.

Weir, a 6'6 forward from Green River, Wyoming, played for the Cowboys from 1940 to 1943, then returned to the Cowboys for the 1945–46 season after a stint in the United States Army during World War II. During Weir's junior season, he averaged 10.1 points per game, third on the team behind stars Kenny Sailors and Milo Komenich. The Cowboys won the NCAA championship, then beat National Invitation Tournament champion St. John's in a match-up of champions of the two major college tournaments. Weir received some All-America attention following the season.

After the close of his collegiate career, Weir became head football coach at his hometown Green River High School, winning state championships in 1949 and 1950.
