= Ray Meyer =

American basketball player and coach, college athletics administrator

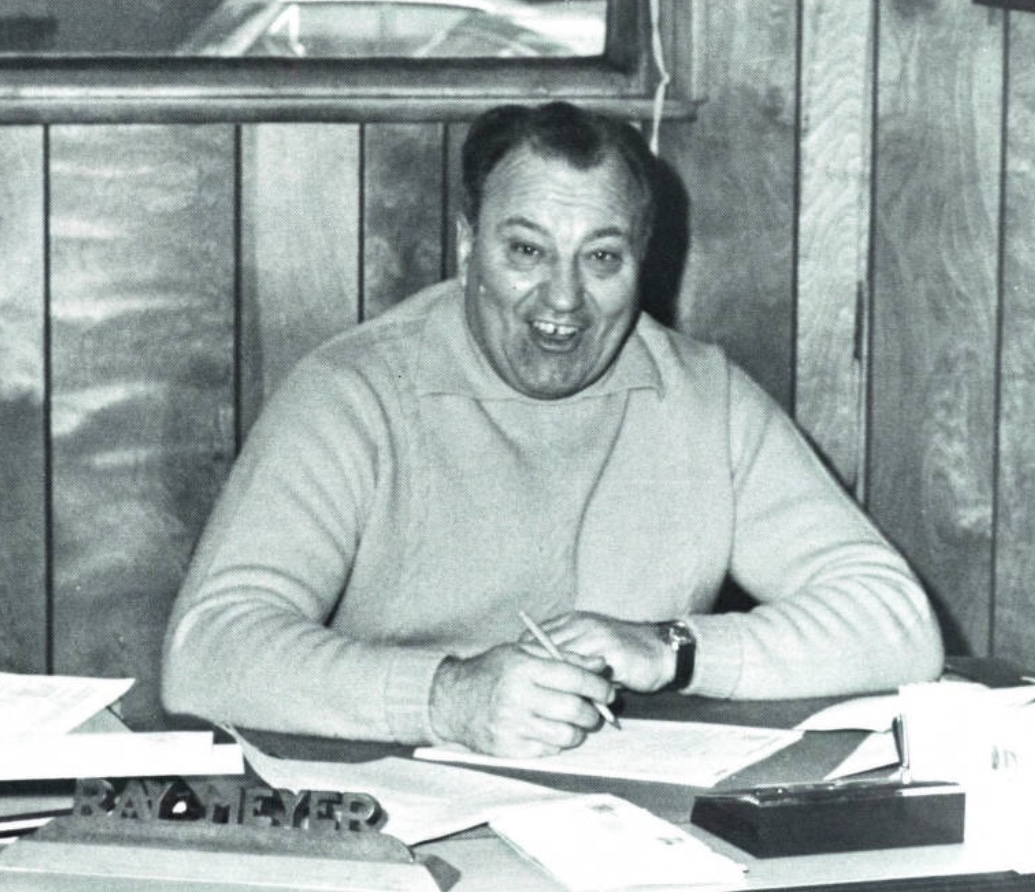
- Meyer from the 1970 DePaulian

Biographical details
- Born: December 18, 1913; Chicago, Illinois, U.S.
- Died: March 17, 2006 (aged 92); Wheeling, Illinois, U.S.

Playing career
- 1935–1938: Notre Dame

Coaching career (HC unless noted)
- 1940–1942: Notre Dame (assistant)
- 1942–1984: DePaul

Administrative career (AD unless noted)
- 1945–1974: DePaul

Head coaching record
- Overall: 724–354
- Tournaments: 14–16 (NCAA Division I); 10–8 (NIT)

Accomplishments and honors

Championships
- 2 NCAA Regional—Final Four (1943, 1979); NIT (1945)

Awards
- 2× AP Coach of the Year (1980, 1984); 2x Henry Iba Award (1978, 1980); NABC Coach of the Year (1979); 2× UPI Coach of the Year (1980, 1984)
- Basketball Hall of Fame; Inducted in 1979 (profile)
- College Basketball Hall of Fame; Inducted in 2006

Raymond Joseph Meyer (December 18, 1913 – March 17, 2006) was an American men's collegiate basketball coach from Chicago, Illinois. He was well known for coaching at DePaul University from 1942 to 1984, compiling a 724–354 record.

== Career ==
Meyer coached DePaul to 21 post-season appearances (13 NCAA, eight NIT). In total, Meyer recorded 37 winning seasons and twelve 20-win seasons, including seven straight from 1978 to 1984. Two Meyer-coached teams reached the Final Four (1943 and 1979), and in 1945, Meyer led DePaul past Bowling Green to capture the National Invitation Tournament, the school's only post-season title.

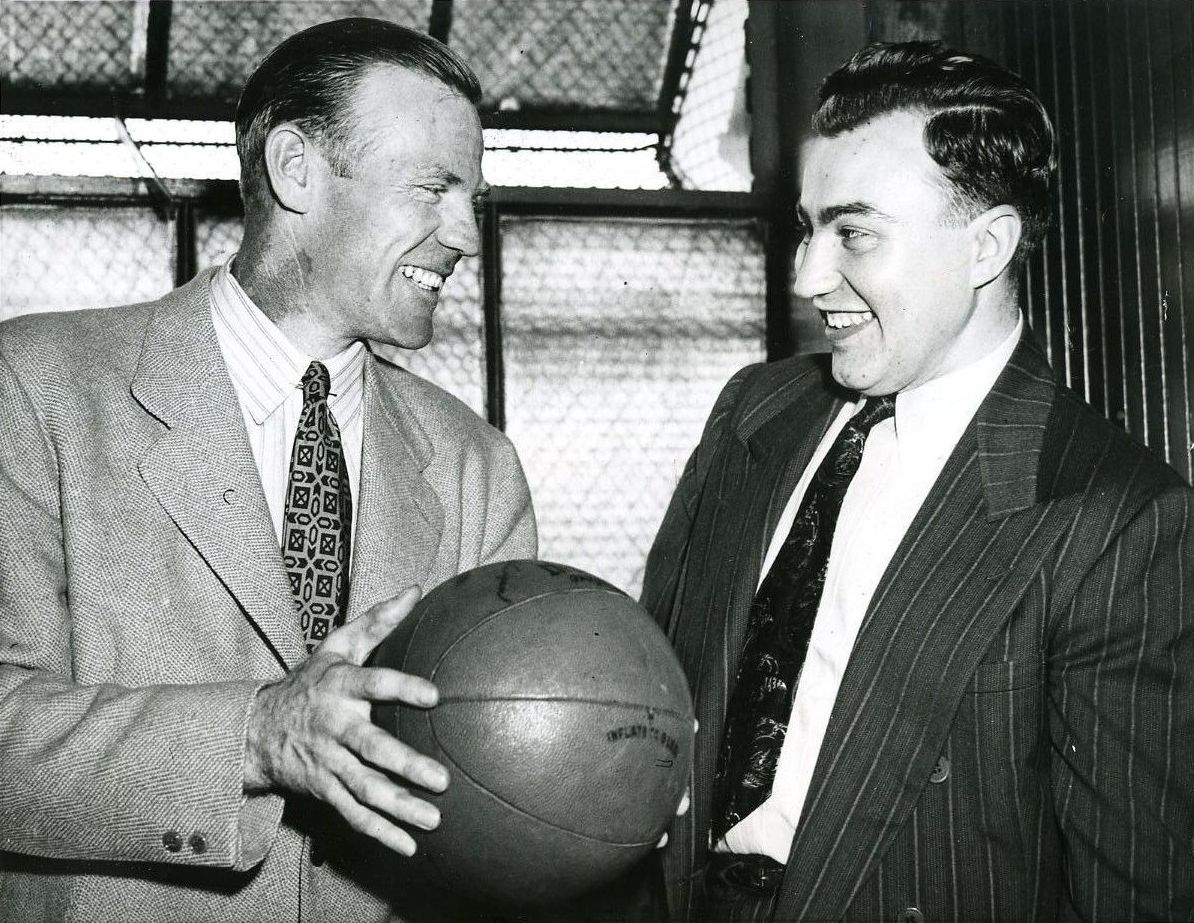
Red Rolfe and Meyer in 1942

Meyer coached a College All-Star team that played a coast-to-coast series against the Harlem Globetrotters for 11 years. One of his best players was George Mikan, who was a game-changing player and basketball's first great "big man". Meyer recruited Mikan from Archbishop Quigley Preparatory Seminary, a school Meyer had himself earlier attended. Other top players coached by Meyer include former NBA players Mark Aguirre and Terry Cummings. During Meyer's tenure the basketball rivalry between DePaul and Loyola reached an extremely high level. Meyer's great-great nephew, Mike Starkman, played basketball for Loyola as a walk-on. Meyer was a much-beloved figure in Chicago, and is a member of the Naismith Memorial Basketball Hall of Fame.

Meyer's final game as a head coach was the Blue Demons' 73–71 overtime loss to Wake Forest in the NCAA Midwest Regional semifinals at St. Louis Arena on March 23, 1984. Two of his sons were also NCAA Division I men's basketball head coaches. Tom Meyer served at the University of Illinois at Chicago for six years from 1977 to his dismissal on April 16, 1983. Joey Meyer took the helm of the Blue Demons upon his father's retirement and stayed at DePaul until his resignation on April 28, 1997.

Meyer also ran a summer basketball camp near Three Lakes in northern Wisconsin for many years.

Meyer died at age 92 at the Addolorata Villa assisted living facility in Wheeling, Illinois on March 17, 2006. He was buried in the All Saints Cemetery in Des Plaines.

== Head coaching record ==
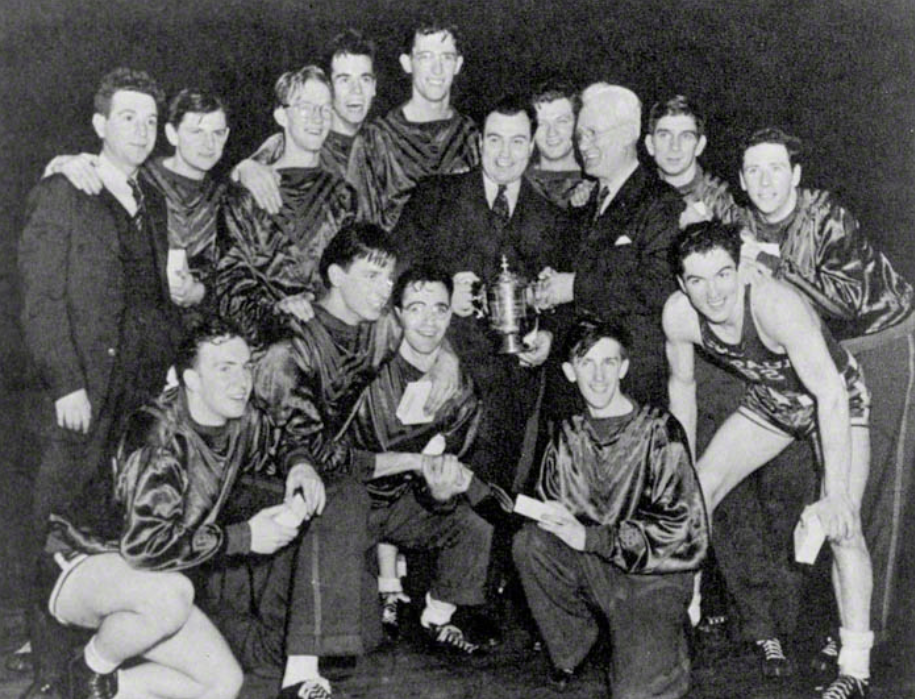
1945 NIT champions

Record table
Season	Team	Overall	Postseason
DePaul Blue Demons (NCAA University Division / Division I independent) (1942–1984)
1942–43	DePaul	19–5	NCAA Final Four
1943–44	DePaul	22–4	NIT Runner-up
1944–45	DePaul	21–3	NIT Champion
1945–46	DePaul	19–5	
1946–47	DePaul	16–9	
1947–48	DePaul	22–8	NIT semifinal
1948–49	DePaul	16–9	
1949–50	DePaul	12–13	
1950–51	DePaul	13–12	
1951–52	DePaul	19–8	
1952–53	DePaul	19–9	NCAA Regional Fourth Place
1953–54	DePaul	11–10	
1954–55	DePaul	16–6	
1955–56	DePaul	16–8	NCAA first round
1956–57	DePaul	8–14	
1957–58	DePaul	8–12	
1958–59	DePaul	13–11	NCAA University Division Regional Fourth Place
1959–60	DePaul	17–7	NCAA University Division Regional Third Place
1960–61	DePaul	17–8	NIT first round
1961–62	DePaul	13–10	
1962–63	DePaul	15–8	NIT first round
1963–64	DePaul	21–4	NIT first round
1964–65	DePaul	17–10	NCAA University Division Regional Fourth Place
1965–66	DePaul	18–8	NIT first round
1966–67	DePaul	17–8	
1967–68	DePaul	13–12	
1968–69	DePaul	14–11	
1969–70	DePaul	12–13	
1970–71	DePaul	8–17	
1971–72	DePaul	12–11	
1972–73	DePaul	14–11	
1973–74	DePaul	16–9	
1974–75	DePaul	15–10	
1975–76	DePaul	20–9	NCAA Division I Sweet 16
1976–77	DePaul	15–12	
1977–78	DePaul	27–3	NCAA Division I Elite Eight
1978–79	DePaul	26–6	NCAA Division I Third Place
1979–80	DePaul	26–2	NCAA Division I second round
1980–81	DePaul	27–2	NCAA Division I second round
1981–82	DePaul	26–2	NCAA Division I second round
1982–83	DePaul	21–12	NIT Runner-up
1983–84	DePaul	27–3	NCAA Division I Sweet 16
DePaul:		724–354	
Total:		724–354	
National champion Postseason invitational champion Conference regular season champion Conference regular season and conference tournament champion Division regular season champion Division regular season and conference tournament champion Conference tournament champion

== See also ==
- Chicagoland Sports Hall of Fame
- List of college men's basketball coaches with 600 wins
- List of NCAA Division I Men's Final Four appearances by coach
