= James Mandler =

American basketball player

- Mandler, from a University of Michigan team photo

Personal information
- Born: March 24, 1922 Illinois
- Died: April 10, 2007 (aged 85) Illinois

Career highlights
- All-Big Ten, 1941–42 (INS)

James Edward Mandler (March 24, 1922 – April 10, 2007) was an American basketball player. He played basketball for the University of Michigan from 1940 to 1943. He was the team's leading scorer for two consecutive years and set the school's single season scoring record with 230 points during the 1941–42 season.

== Early years ==
Mandler was raised in Chicago and attended Kelvyn Park High School. His father, Emil Mandler, was the son of Swedish immigrants and was the part owner of a laundry. His mother, Agnes Mandler, was the daughter of Scottish and Swedish immigrants.

== Student-athlete ==
Mandler attended the University of Michigan. While attending Michigan, he played at the center position for the Michigan Wolverines men's basketball team from 1940 to 1943. He was the leading scorer on the 1941–42 and 1942–43 teams. His total of 230 points during the 1941–42 seasons broke Michigan's single-season scoring record. His record was broken by Mack Supronowicz during the 1948–49 season. He was selected as an All-Big Ten player by the International News Service for the 1941–42 season and as the captain of Michigan's 1942–43 team.

== Legal career and later years ==
Mandler graduated from Michigan with a bachelor's degree in 1943 and served as a lieutenant in the United States Navy from 1944 to 1945. He returned to the University of Michigan for law school receiving his law degree in 1948. He was an officer of Chicago's Harris Trust and Savings Bank for many years and was promoted to senior vice president in 1971. He was a resident of Deerfield, Illinois. He died in April 2007 at age 85.
