= 1942–43 Cincinnati Bearcats men's basketball team =

American college basketball season

1942–43 Cincinnati Bearcats men's basketball
- Conference: Independent
- Record: 9–10
- Head coach: Bob Reuss (1st season)
- Home arena: Schmidlapp Gymnasium

The 1942–43 Cincinnati Bearcats men's basketball team represented the University of Cincinnati during the 1942–43 NCAA men's basketball season. The head coach was Bob Reuss, coaching his first season with the Bearcats. The team finished with an overall record of 9–10.

== Schedule ==
Date time, TV	Opponent	Result	Record	Site city, state
December 5	Wilmington	W 38–31	1–0	Schmidlapp Gymnasium; Cincinnati, OH
December 9	Georgetown (KY)	W 52–40	2–0	Schmidlapp Gymnasium; Cincinnati, OH
December 12	at Kentucky	L 39–61	2–1	Alumni Gymnasium; Lexington, KY
December 15	Wittenberg	W 49–48	3–1	Schmidlapp Gymnasium; Cincinnati, OH
December 19	at Ohio	L 39–51	3–2	Men's Gymnasium; Athens, OH
January 2	Ohio	L 33–48	3–3	Schmidlapp Gymnasium; Cincinnati, OH
January 9	Akron	L 35–43	3–4	Schmidlapp Gymnasium; Cincinnati, OH
January 12	Miami (OH)	W 54–44	4–4	Schmidlapp Gymnasium; Cincinnati, OH
January 16	at Wilmington	W 50–30	5–4	Wilmington, OH
January 23	at Dayton	L 39–47	5–5	Montgomery County Fairgrounds Coliseum; Dayton, OH
January 29	at Mount Union	L 49–54	5–6	Alliance, OH
January 30	at Wooster	W 40–39	6–6	Wooster, OH
February 4	Hanover	W 67–33	7–6	Schmidlapp Gymnasium; Cincinnati, OH
February 10	at Toledo	L 34–50	7–7	The Field House; Toledo, OH
February 12	vs. West. Reserve	L 52–55 ^{OT}	7–8	Schmidt Field House; Cincinnati, OH
February 19	vs. Dayton	L 34–47	7–9	Schmidt Field House; Cincinnati, OH
February 23	at Hanover	W 52–48	8–9	Hanover, IN
February 27	at Miami (OH)	W 50–41	9–9	Withrow Court; Oxford, OH
March 3	at Xavier	L 37–51	9–10	Schmidt Field House; Cincinnati, OH
*Non-conference game. (#) Tournament seedings in parentheses.
