= Kenneth L. Tallman =

United States Air Force general

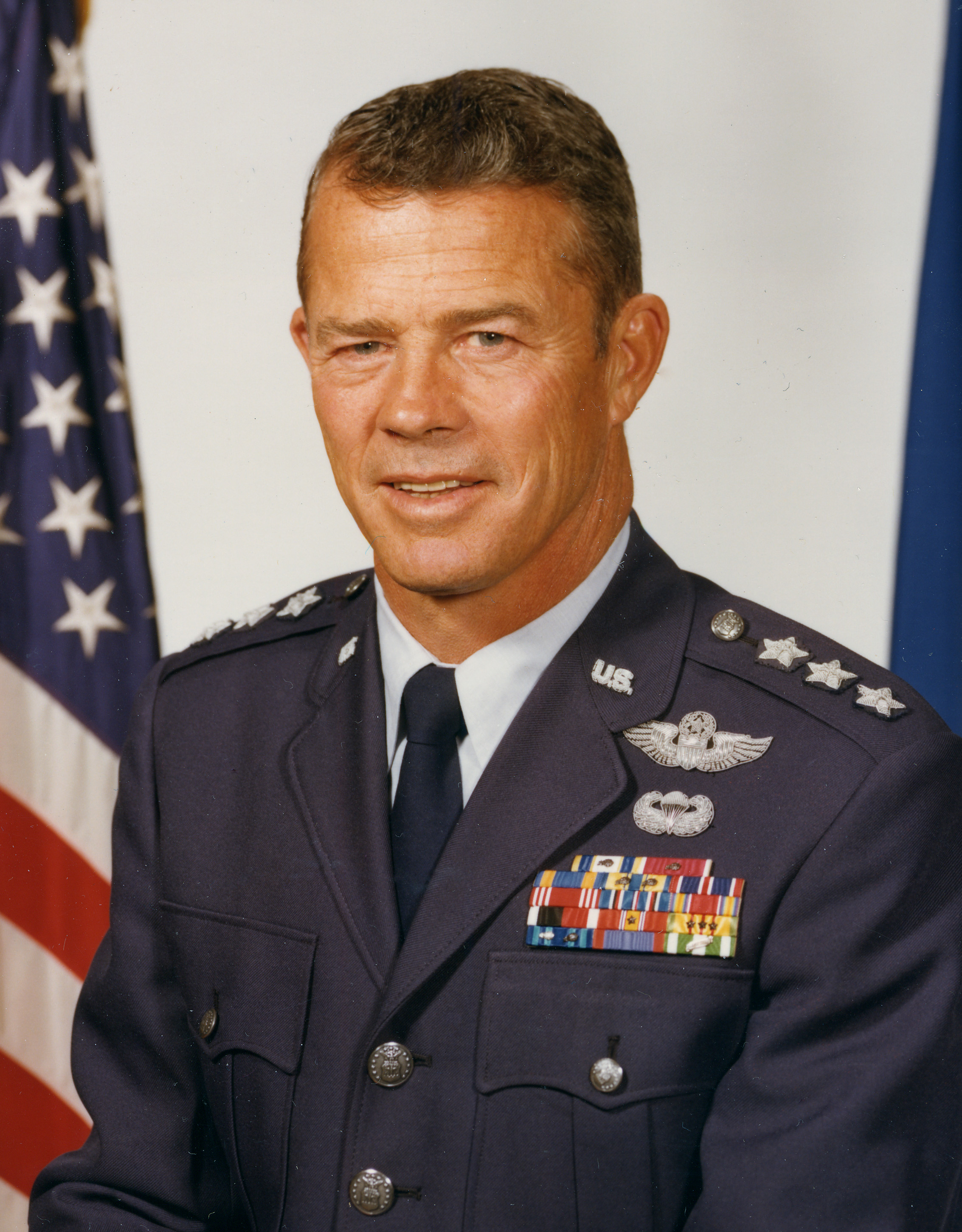
- Born: Kenneth Lee Tallman; March 22, 1925; Omaha, Nebraska, U.S.
- Died: March 6, 2006 (aged 80); Tallahassee, Florida, U.S.
- Military career
- Allegiance: United States of America
- Branch: United States Army Air Forces; United States Air Force
- Service years: 1946–1981
- Rank: Lieutenant General
- Nickname: Ken
- Commands: Superintendent, U.S. Air Force Academy
- Conflicts: Vietnam War
- Awards: Distinguished Service Medal (3); Legion of Merit (2); Air Medal
- Other work: President, Embry-Riddle Aeronautical University

Kenneth L. Tallman (March 22, 1925 – March 6, 2006) was a United States Air Force lieutenant general. He was the eighth Superintendent of the United States Air Force Academy.

== Biography ==
Kenneth Lee Tallman was born on March 22, 1925, in Omaha, Nebraska. Raised in Cheyenne, Wyoming, he graduated from Cheyenne High School in 1942, and enrolled at the University of Wyoming where he was a member of their NCAA basketball championship team in 1943.

=== Military service ===
He enrolled in the United States Military Academy, West Point, New York, graduating in 1946. While there, he participated on the football, basketball and track teams. He received a master's degree in international affairs from The George Washington University in 1967 and an honorary doctor of laws degree from the University of Wyoming in 1978.

Tallman earned his pilot wings in the United States Army Air Forces at Stewart Field, New York in 1946, and then served in a succession of fighter unit assignments, including aircraft carrier duty with the Navy.

In 1956, Tallman (USAF) became a training officer at the U.S. Air Force Academy, eventually assuming the duties of cadet group air officer commanding. AOCs assist and advise cadet commanders in the operation of their units.

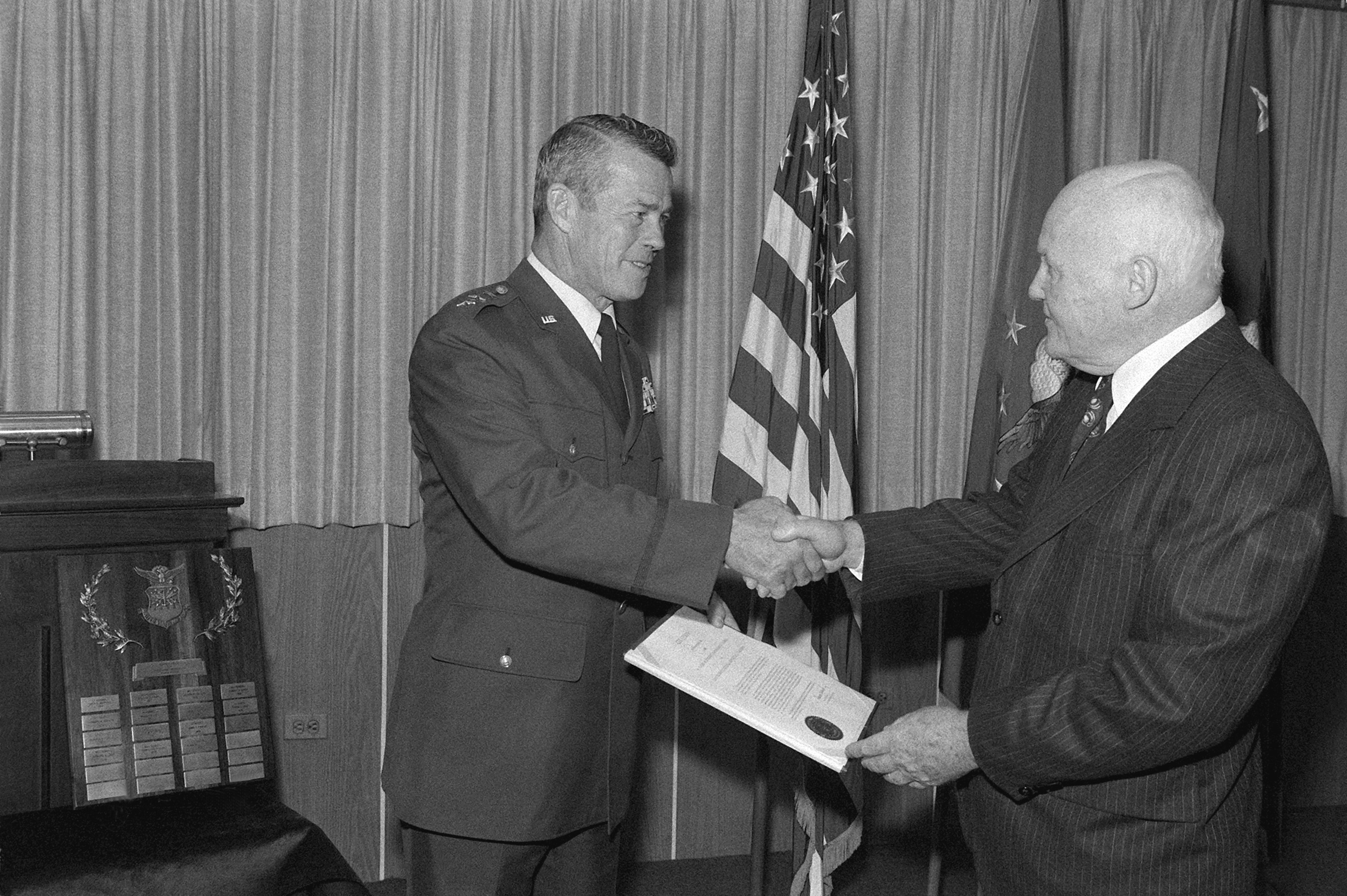
Kenneth L. Tallman, left, receives the Zuckert Award from former Secretary of the Air Force Eugene M. Zuckert

Three years later he was transferred to Headquarters U.S. Air Forces in Europe as an operations staff officer. Returning from Europe in 1962, he entered the Marine Corps Senior Staff School, Quantico, Virginia, completing it a year later. He then had a series of operational duties in the United States until 1965 when he became executive assistant to the commander, Military Assistance Command, Vietnam, in Saigon.

He completed the National War College in 1967 and was assigned to Headquarters U.S. Air Force as assistant for colonel assignments under the Deputy Chief of Staff, Personnel. In 1970, he became commander, 836th Air Division, MacDill Air Force Base, Florida.

The next year, he was named deputy commander, Air Force Military Personnel Center, Randolph Air Force Base, Texas, and in 1972 assumed command of the center. In June 1973, he moved to Headquarters U.S. Air Force to serve as director of personnel plans, Office of the Deputy Chief of Staff, Personnel. He became deputy chief of staff, personnel, Headquarters U.S. Air Force in August 1975.

General Tallman became the eighth U.S. Air Force Academy Superintendent on June 27, 1977.

His military decorations include the Air Force Distinguished Service Medal with two oak leaf clusters, the Legion of Merit with oak leaf cluster, the Air Medal, and the Air Force Commendation Medal with two oak leaf clusters.

Tallman was promoted to lieutenant general September 1, 1975, with date of rank August 27, 1975. He retired July 1, 1981, later serving as President of Embry-Riddle Aeronautical University for five years. Tallman died March 6, 2006, of complications of Alzheimer's disease and Parkinson's disease. He was interred at Arlington National Cemetery on April 11, 2006. A plaque was also placed in his memory at the United States Air Force Academy Cemetery.
