= 1942–43 UCLA Bruins men's basketball team =

American college basketball season

1942–43 UCLA Bruins men's basketball
- Conference: Pacific Coast Conference
- South
- Record: 14–7 (4–4 PCC)
- Head coach: Wilbur Johns (4th season)
- Assistant coach: Jack Montgomery
- Home arena: Men's Gym

1942–43 Pacific Coast Conference men's basketball standings
	Conf.				Overall
Team	W		L	PCT	W		L	PCT
North
Washington †	12	–	4	.750	24	–	7	.774
Oregon	10	–	6	.625	19	–	10	.655
Washington State	9	–	7	.563	19	–	11	.633
Oregon State	8	–	8	.500	19	–	9	.679
Idaho	1	–	15	.063	14	–	20	.412
South
USC	7	–	1	.875	23	–	5	.821
UCLA	4	–	4	.500	14	–	7	.667
Stanford	4	–	4	.500	10	–	11	.476
California	1	–	7	.125	9	–	15	.375
† Conference playoff series winner

The 1942–43 UCLA Bruins men's basketball team represented the University of California, Los Angeles during the 1942–43 NCAA men's basketball season and were members of the Pacific Coast Conference. The Bruins were led by fourth year head coach Wilbur Johns. They finished the regular season with a record of 14–7 and were second in the PCC southern division with a record of 4–4.

== Previous season ==
The Bruins finished the regular season with a record of 5–18 and were fourth in the PCC southern division with a record of 2–10.

== Roster ==
1942–43 UCLA Bruins men's basketball team
Players
Coaches

Pos.	#	Name	Height	Weight	Year	Hometown
C	11	Don Barksdale	6 ft 6 in (1.98 m)	200 lb (91 kg)		Berkeley, California
G	16	Ainslie Bell	—	—
G	15	Jack Baddeley	—	—
F	3	Tom Brown	—	—
G	7	John Fryer (C)	—	—
	18	Bob Jones	—	—
C	8	Marvin Lee	—	—
	10	John Moore	—	—
C	23	Bill O'Brien	—	—
F	14	Mickey Panovich	—	—
G	4	Richard Perry	—	—
G	13	Bruce Sieck	—	—
F	12	Dick West	—	—	Fr

Head coach

Wilbur Johns (UCLA)

Assistant coach(es)

- Jack Montgomery (UCLA)

Legend

- (C) Team captain
- (S) Suspended
- (I) Ineligible
- (W) Walk-on
- Injured
- Current redshirt

Roster
Last update: 30 January 2018

== Schedule ==
Date time, TV	Rank^{#}	Opponent^{#}	Result	Record	Site city, state
Regular Season
*		Lockheed-Vega All-Stars	W 42–34	1–0	Men's Gym; Los Angeles, CA
*		at Loyola Marymount	W 38–17	2–0	Los Angeles, CA
*		Loyola Marymount	W 37–20	3–0	Men's Gym; Los Angeles, CA
*		San Francisco	W 41–30	4–0	Men's Gym; Los Angeles, CA
*		San Francisco	W 39–37	5–0	Men's Gym; Los Angeles, CA
*		Whittier	L 42–44 ^{OT}	5–1	Men's Gym; Los Angeles, CA
*		Los Alamitos Naval Air Base	W 68–43	6–1	Men's Gym; Los Angeles, CA
*		Santa Ana Army Air Base	W 46–37	7–1	Men's Gym; Los Angeles, CA
		California	W 49–40	8–1 (1–0)	Men's Gym; Los Angeles, CA
*		at 20th Century Fox	L 52–53	8–2	Los Angeles City College Gym; Los Angeles, CA
*		20th Century Fox	W 43–37	9–2	Men's Gym; Los Angeles, CA
		at USC	L 49–60	9–3 (1–1)	Shrine Auditorium; Los Angeles, CA
		at USC	L 39–51	9–4 (1–2)	Shrine Auditorium; Los Angeles, CA
*		at Santa Ana Army Air Base	W 43–36	10–4	Santa Ana, CA
*		at 20th Century Fox	L 39–44	10–5	Los Angeles City College Gym; Los Angeles, CA
*		St. Mary's Pre-Flight	W 41–38	11–5	Men's Gym; Los Angeles, CA
February 20, 1943		Stanford	W 60–57	12–5 (2–2)	Men's Gym; Los Angeles, CA
February 26, 1943		at Stanford	L 41–60	12–6 (2–3)	Stanford Pavilion; Stanford, CA
February 27, 1943		at California	W 42–40	13–6 (3–3)	Men's Gym; Berkeley, CA
March 5, 1943		USC	W 42–37	14–6 (4–3)	Men's Gym; Los Angeles, CA
March 6, 1943		USC	L 46–53	14–7 (4–4)	Men's Gym; Los Angeles, CA
*Non-conference game. ^{#}Rankings from AP Poll. (#) Tournament seedings in parentheses. All times are in Pacific Time.
