= 1942–43 Wyoming Cowboys basketball team =

American college basketball season

1942–43 Wyoming Cowboys basketball
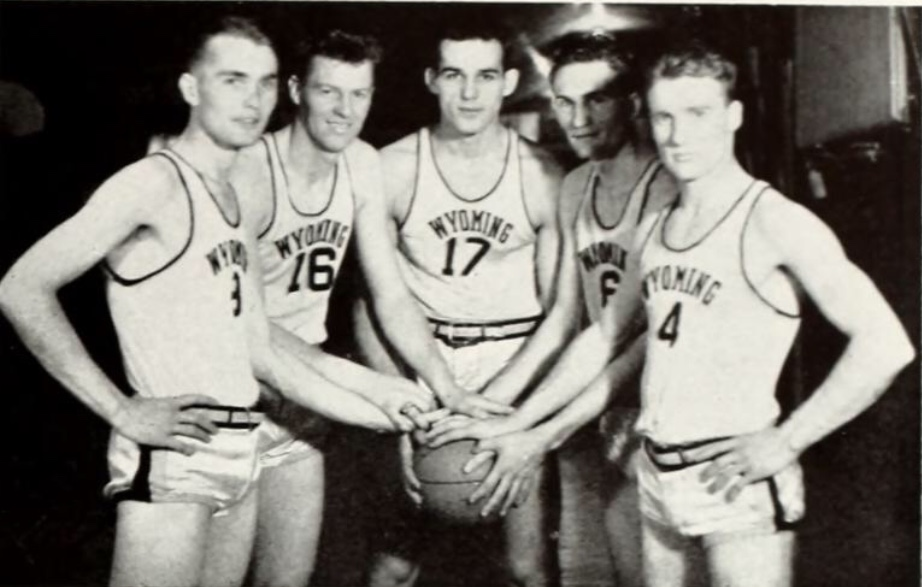

NCAA tournament National champions Big Seven regular season champions

National Championship Game, W 46–34 vs. Georgetown
- Conference: Mountain States Conference
- Record: 31–2 (4-0 Big Seven)
- Head coach: Everett Shelton

The 1942–43 Wyoming Cowboys basketball team represented the University of Wyoming in NCAA men's competition in the 1942–43 NCAA college basketball season. The Cowboys won the Mountain States Conference championship and were the first basketball team from the Rocky Mountains to win an NCAA title. Kenny Sailors of Hillsdale, Wyoming averaged 15.5 points per game and Milo Komenich averaged 16.7 points per game in leading the team to the championship. Despite playing just nine home games during the year, the Cowboys won 32 games.

== Schedule ==
Date time, TV	Rank^{#}	Opponent^{#}	Result	Record	Site city, state
December 11		at Fort Warren	W 49-33	1-0	near the South Platte River
December 11		at Fort Warren	W 53-43	2-0	near the South Platte River
December 19		Fort Warren	W 63-40	3-0	Laramie, WY
December 23		at Duquesne	L 33-43	3-1	Pittsburgh, PA
December 24		at Albright	W 56-42	4-1	Reading, PA
December 26		at La Salle	W 56-32	5-1	Philadelphia, PA
December 30		at Saint Francis (PA)	W 63-48	6-1	Loretto, PA
January 1, 1943		at Rochester (NY)	W 68-44	7-1	Rochester, NY
January 2, 1943		at Lawrence Tech	W 78-34	8-1	Southfield, MI
January 15, 1943		at Utah	W 66-38	9-1	Salt Lake City, UT
January 16, 1943		at Utah	W 68-25	10-1	Salt Lake City, UT
January 22, 1943		at Colorado State	W 66-42	11-1	Fort Collins, CO
January 23, 1943		Colorado State	W 49-23	12-1	Laramie, WY
January 28, 1943		Regis (CO)	W 101-45	13-1	Laramie, WY
January 30, 1943		at Regis (CO)	W 86-34	14-1	Denver, CO
February 2, 1943		at Phillips 66ers	W 42-41 ^{OT}	15-1	Bartlesville, OK
February 3, 1943		at Phillips 66ers	W 37-36	16-1	Bartlesville, OK
February 12, 1943		Colorado State	W 57-34	17-1	Laramie, WY
February 13, 1943		at Colorado State	W 65-40	18-1	Fort Collins, CO
February 19, 1943		Utah	W 75-46	19-1	Laramie, WY
February 20, 1943		Utah	W 45-31	20-1	Laramie, WY
February 25, 1943		BYU	W 53-42	21-1	Laramie, WY
February 26, 1943		BYU	W 47-43	22-1	Laramie, WY
February 27, 1943		BYU	W 66-43	23-1	Laramie, WY
March 16, 1943		at Howard Payne	W 77-40	24-1	Brownwood, TX
March 17, 1943		vs. Colorado Mines	W 77-51	25-1	Denver, CO
March 18, 1943		at Poudre Valley	W 64-27	26-1	
March 19, 1943		at Denver Legion	L 33-41	26-2	Denver, CO
March 20, 1943		at Denver	W 58-45	27-2	Denver, CO
March 26, 1943		vs. Oklahoma; NCAA Quarterfinal	W 53-50	28-2	Municipal Auditorium; Kansas City, MO
March 27, 1943		vs. Texas; NCAA Semifinal	W 58-54	29-2	Municipal Auditorium; Kansas City, MO
March 30, 1943		vs. Georgetown; NCAA Championship	W 46-34	30-2	Madison Square Garden; New York, NY
April 1, 1943		at Saint John's (NY); Red Cross Benefit Game	W 52-47 ^{OT}	31-2	Madison Square Garden; New York, NY
*Non-conference game. ^{#}Rankings from AP Poll. (#) Tournament seedings in parentheses.

== Roster ==
Name	Position	Home Town
Charles Castle	Forward	Phoenix, AZ
James Collins	Guard	Laramie
Jimmy Darden	Forward	Cheyenne
Jack Downey	Guard	Phoenix, AZ
Vernon Jensen	Guard	Lyman
Antone Katana	Center	Rock Springs
Milo Komenich	Center	Gary, IN
Earl Ray	Guard	Casper
Jimmie Reese	Forward	Rock Springs
Lou Roney	Guard	Powell
Ken Sailors	Forward	Laramie
Kenneth Tallman	Forward	Cheyenne
Floyd Volker	Forward	Casper
Donald Waite	Guard	Scottsbluff, NE
Jim Weir	Forward	Green River

== Regular season ==
In the fourth game of the season, the Cowboys lost to Duquesne. It would be the last game the Cowboys would lose to a college team during the season. Their only other loss was to the Denver Legion team. The Cowboys outscored their opponents by an average of over twenty points per game and were the first Wyoming team to score over 100 points in a game, by beating Regis 101–45.

== Postseason ==
=== NCAA tournament ===
- West regional (Kansas City)
  - Wyoming 53, Oklahoma 50
  - Wyoming 58, Texas 54 (National semifinal)
- Championship (New York)
  - Wyoming 46, Georgetown 34

=== Red Cross game ===
St. John's won the eight-team National Invitation Tournament the night before, also at Madison Square Garden, and claimed it was better than Wyoming and that the NIT was a better event than the eight-team NCAA tournament. Ev Shelton talked Ned Irish, the promoter at Madison Square Garden, into hosting a showdown game, with proceeds going to the Red Cross. Two days after winning the NCAA Championship at Madison Square Garden, Wyoming met St. John's in a Red Cross benefit game for the war effort, and the Cowboys won in overtime, 52–47.

== Awards and honors ==
- First team from the Rocky Mountains to win an NCAA championship
- Only Wyoming basketball team to win an NCAA championship
- Defeated NIT champion St. John's in Red Cross benefit game
- Ken Sailors, First-team All-America selection
- Ken Sailors, NCAA Men's MOP Award
