= 1942–43 Kansas Jayhawks men's basketball team =

American college basketball season

1942–43 Kansas Jayhawks men's basketball

Big Six Champions
- Conference: Big Six Conference
- Record: 22–6 (10–0 Big 6)
- Head coach: Phog Allen (26th season)
- Captain: John Buescher
- Home arena: Hoch Auditorium

1942–43 Big Six Conference men's basketball standings
	Conf.				Overall
Team	W		L	PCT	W		L	PCT
Kansas	10	–	0	1.000	22	–	6	.786
Missouri	7	–	3	.700	18	–	9	.667
Oklahoma	5	–	5	.500	7	–	10	.412
Nebraska	5	–	5	.500	6	–	10	.375
Iowa State	2	–	8	.200	7	–	9	.438
Kansas State	1	–	9	.100	6	–	14	.300

The 1942–43 Kansas Jayhawks men's basketball team represented the University of Kansas during the 1942–43 college men's basketball season.

== Roster ==
- Otto Schnellbacher
- John Buescher
- Donald Blair
- Robert "Bob" Fitzpatrick
- Max Kissell
- Paul Turner
- Jack Ballard
- Charles B. Black
- Ray Evans
- George Dick
- William Brill
- Armand Dixon
- William Forsyth
- John Short
- Hoyt Baker
- Harold McSpadden

== Schedule ==
Date time, TV	Rank^{#}	Opponent^{#}	Result	Record	Site city, state
December 5*		vs. Olathe NAB	L 29–40	0-1	Municipal Auditorium; Kansas City, MO
December 11*		at Rockhurst	W 44–40	1-1	Municipal Auditorium; Kansas City, MO
December 15*		Creighton	L 33–38	1-2	Hoch Auditorium; Lawrence, KS
December 26*		vs. St. Bonaventure	W 53–22	2-2	Buffalo Memorial Auditorium; Buffalo, NY
December 28		at Fordham	W 31–30	3-2	Rose Hill Gymnasium; New York, NY
December 30*		at Saint Joseph's	W 63–38	4-2	Convention Hall; Philadelphia, PA
January 1*		at Saint Louis	W 60–25	5-2	West Pine Gym; St. Louis, MO
January 4*		Olathe AAB	W 60–32	6-2	Hoch Auditorium; Lawrence, KS
January 6		Missouri; Border War	W 69–44	7-2 (1-0)	Hoch Auditorium; Lawrence, KS
January 9		at Oklahoma	W 48–44	8-2 (2-0)	Field House; Norman, OK
January 13*		Oklahoma A&M	W 36–29	9-2	Hoch Auditorium; Lawrence, KS
January 10*		at N. Amer. Bombers	W 45–36	10-2	Municipal Auditorium; Kansas City, MO
January 16*		vs. Camp Crowder	W 57–26	11-2	Municipal Auditorium; Kansas City, MO
January 16*		vs. Rosecrans A.F.	W 71–22	12-2	Municipal Auditorium; Kansas City, MO
January 20		at Kansas State; Sunflower Showdown	W 40–20	13-2 (3-0)	Nichols Hall; Manhattan, KS
January 23*		at Camp Crowder	L 31–35	13-3	Neosho, MO
January 29*		vs. Olathe NAB	W 47–36	14-3	Municipal Auditorium; Kansas City, MO
January 30*		vs. Great Lakes NTS	L 41–47	14-4	Municipal Auditorium; Kansas City, MO
February 3*		at Olathe AAB	L 32–42	14-5	Olathe, KS
February 6		Iowa State	W 44–20	15-5 (4-0)	Hoch Auditorium; Lawrence, KS
February 13		at Nebraska	W 56–24	16-5 (5-0)	Nebraska Coliseum; Lincoln, NE
February 15		at Iowa State	W 37–29	17-5 (6-0)	State Gymnasium; Ames, IA
February 17*		at Oklahoma A&M	W 47–43	18-5	Gallagher-Iba Arena; Stillwater, OK
February 23		Nebraska	W 52–33	19-5 (7-0)	Hoch Auditorium; Lawrence, KS
February 26		Oklahoma	W 42–35	20-5 (8-0)	Hoch Auditorium; Lawrence, KS
March 2		at Missouri; Border War	W 47–44	21-5 (9-0)	Brewer Fieldhouse; Columbia, MO
March 4		at Creighton	L 34–56	21-6	University Gym; Omaha, NE
March 6		Kansas State; Sunflower Showdown	W 47–30	22-6 (10-0)	Hoch Auditorium; Lawrence, KS
*Non-conference game. ^{#}Rankings from AP Poll. (#) Tournament seedings in parentheses.
