= Kelvyn Park High School =

Public junior and senior high school in Chicago, Illinois

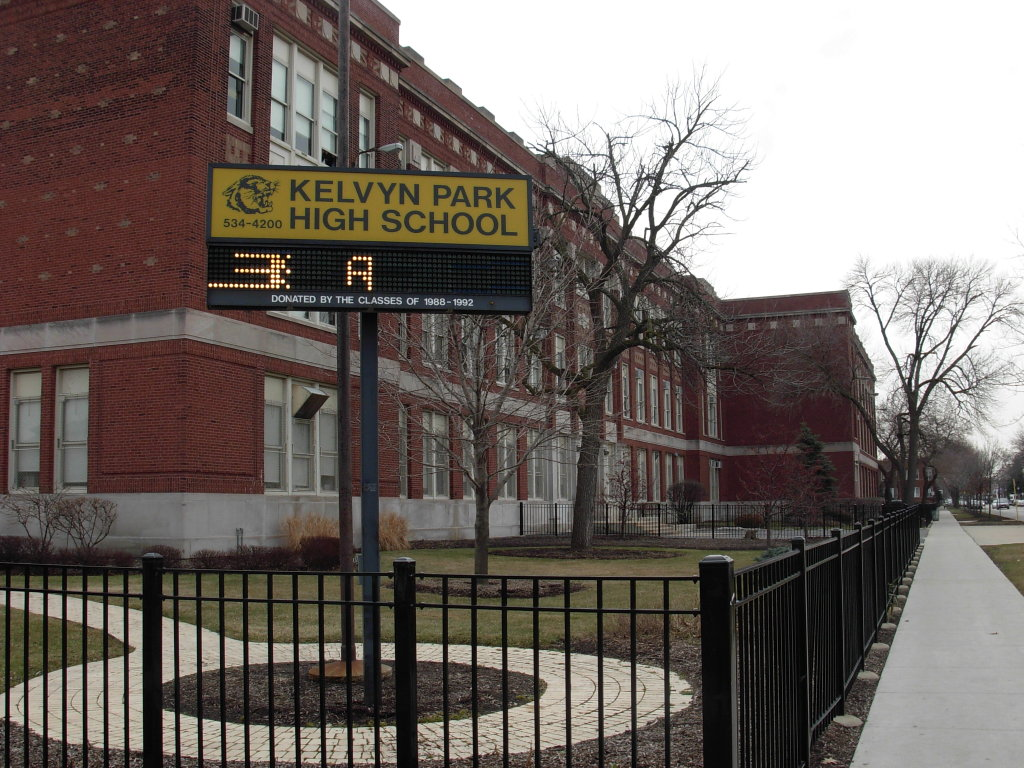

Location
- 4343 West Wrightwood Avenue; Chicago, Illinois 60639; United States; 41.9275°N 87.7360°W

Information
- School type: Public junior and senior high school
- School district: Chicago Public Schools
- Principal: Michelle Suttmeier
- Grades: 7–12
- Gender: Coeducational
- Enrollment: 546
- Campus type: Urban
- Athletics conference: Chicago Public League
- Team name: Panthers
- Website: kphermosa.org

Kelvyn Park High School is a public junior and senior high school in the Hermosa neighborhood on the Northwest Side of Chicago, Illinois. Operated by Chicago Public Schools (CPS), it serves grades 7 through 12 and is designated by the district as a fine and performing arts school.

== History ==
The school building at 4343 West Wrightwood Avenue was constructed in 1918 and expanded in 1928. In 1927, Barry Elementary School opened to relieve overcrowding at Kelvyn Park School. Kelvyn Park became a high school in 1933, while elementary students remained until 1936.

In 1979, WTTW aired As We See It, a documentary created by Kelvyn Park students as a mock news broadcast. The film addressed integration and student life while the school was changing from a majority-White to a majority-Latino student body.

By 2003, enrollment exceeded 2,000 students in a building designed for 1,200. That year, CPS and city officials broke ground on a $34 million high school intended to relieve overcrowding at Kelvyn Park.

In December 2013, the Chicago Board of Education approved converting Ames Middle School into a citywide military academy. The change assigned middle-school students from the Barry, Falconer, and Nixon elementary attendance areas to Kelvyn Park, which began serving grades 7 through 12 in the 2014–2015 school year. The Ames conversion drew opposition from parents and two board members.

== Student body ==
A 2024 profile by the University of Chicago's To&Through Project reported that 87 percent of students were Hispanic, 48.3 percent were English learners, 21 percent were students with disabilities, and 84.3 percent qualified for free or reduced-price lunch. Of the students who first entered ninth grade in 2020–2021, 66 percent graduated by spring 2024.

== Academic programs ==
Kelvyn Park's programs include fine and performing arts, digital media, health science, general education, and an open-enrollment program for seventh and eighth grades. The school also offers JROTC and career and technical education pathways in digital media and allied health.

== Athletics ==
Kelvyn Park competes in the Chicago Public League and is a member of the Illinois High School Association (IHSA). Its teams are known as the Panthers. The boys' basketball team won an IHSA regional title in 1935–1936 and the Chicago Public League championship in 1942–1943 under coach Phil Brownstein. The boys' volleyball team won IHSA regional titles in 2002–2003 and 2003–2004. The Chicago Board of Education also recognized the team as the 2003 Public League boys' volleyball champion.

== Notable alumni ==
- Norm Amundsen – National Football League guard for the Green Bay Packers.
- Cynthia Carlson – visual artist associated with the Pattern and Decoration movement.
- Gordie Gillespie – college and high-school baseball, football, and basketball coach.
- Michael Gross (class of 1965) – actor known for Family Ties and the Tremors franchise.
- Ray Gunkel – amateur and professional wrestler and wrestling promoter.
- James Mandler – college basketball player for the University of Michigan.
