= 1942–43 Georgia Bulldogs basketball team =

American college basketball season

1942–43 Georgia Bulldogs basketball
- Conference: Southeastern Conference
- Record: 4–13 (1–8 SEC)
- Head coach: Elmer A. Lampe (6th season)
- Captain: Charles Anderson
- Home arena: Woodruff Hall

1942–43 Southeastern Conference men's basketball standings
	Conf.				Overall
Team	W		L	PCT	W		L	PCT
Kentucky	8	–	1	.889	17	–	6	.739
LSU	11	–	2	.846	18	–	4	.818
Tennessee †	6	–	3	.667	14	–	4	.778
Mississippi State	13	–	7	.650	14	–	8	.636
Georgia Tech	7	–	4	.636	11	–	5	.688
Vanderbilt	9	–	7	.563	10	–	8	.556
Alabama	9	–	9	.500	10	–	10	.500
Ole Miss	6	–	8	.429	8	–	10	.444
Tulane	4	–	8	.333	4	–	9	.308
Georgia	1	–	8	.111	4	–	13	.235
Auburn	1	–	12	.077	1	–	14	.067
Florida	0	–	6	.000	8	–	7	.533
† Regular-season championship and SEC Tournament winner

The 1942–43 Georgia Bulldogs basketball team represented the University of Georgia as a member of the Southeastern Conference (SEC) during the 1942–43 NCAA men's basketball season. Led by sixth-year head coach Elmer A. Lampe, the Bulldogs compiled an overall record of 4–13 with a mark of 1–8 in conference play, placing tenth in the SEC. The team captain was Charles Anderson.

== Schedule ==
Date time, TV	Opponent	Result	Record	Site city, state
1/9/1943	at Camp Wheeler	L 38-52	0–1	
1/12/1943	at South Carolina	L 35-43	0–2	
1/15/1943	Vanderbilt	L 35-39	0–3	Athens, GA
1/18/1943	Kentucky	L 28-60	0–4	Athens, GA
1/22/1943	Lawson General Hospital	W 47-33	1–4	Athens, GA
1/30/1943	Camp Wheeler	L 37-47	1–5	Athens, GA
2/2/1943	LSU	L 39-54	1–6	Athens, GA
2/5/1943	at Auburn	L 32-47	1–7	
2/6/1943	at Ft. Benning	L 31-32	1–8	
2/10/1943	at Alabama	L 25-47	1–9	
2/11/1943	Sinkwich’s All-Stars	W 25-21	2–9	Athens, GA
2/13/1943	Auburn	W 51-31	3–9	Athens, GA
2/18/1943	Georgia Tech	L 31-58	3–10	Athens, GA
2/20/1943	at Georgia Tech	L 20-39	3–11	
2/23/1943	Vanderbilt	L 31-66	3–12	Athens, GA
2/25/1943	Ole Miss	W 36-27	4–12	Athens, GA
2/26/1943	Kentucky	L 30-59	4–13	Athens, GA
*Non-conference game. (#) Tournament seedings in parentheses.
