= 1942–43 St. John's Redmen basketball team =

American college basketball season

1942–43 St. John's Redmen men's basketball

National Invitation Tournament Champions

NIT Championship, W 48-21 vs. Toledo
- Conference: Metropolitan New York Conference
- Record: 21–3 (5–1 Metropolitan New York Conference)
- Head coach: Joseph Lapchick
- Captain: Fuzzy Levane
- Home arena: DeGray Gymnasium; Madison Square Garden

The 1942–43 St. John's Redmen basketball team represented St. John's College of Brooklyn during the 1942–43 NCAA college basketball season. The team was coached by Joseph Lapchick in his seventh year at the school. St. John's home games were played at DeGray Gymnasium in Brooklyn and the old Madison Square Garden in Manhattan.

== Roster ==
#	Name	Height	Position	Class	Hometown	Previous School(s)
6	Al Moschetti	6"1"	G	Sr.	Brooklyn, NY, U.S.	New Utrecht HS
9	Larry Baxter	6'3"	F	Jr.	Brooklyn, NY, U.S.	James Madison HS
11	Harry Boykoff	6'9"	C	So.	Brooklyn, NY, U.S.	Thomas Jefferson HS
12	Hy Gotkin	5'8"	G	So.	Brooklyn, NY, U.S.	Thomas Jefferson HS
14	Fuzzy Levane (C)	6"2"	G/F	Sr.	Brooklyn, NY, U.S.	James Madison HS
17	Frank Plantamura	6'4"	F	So.	Union City, NJ, U.S.	Union Hill HS
	Ken Keller	6'1"	G	So.	Brooklyn, NY, U.S.	Bishop Loughlin HS

== Schedule and results ==
Date time, TV	Rank^{#}	Opponent^{#}	Result	Record	Site city, state
Regular Season
12/05/42*		Alumni	W 65-33	1-0	DeGray Gymnasium; Brooklyn, NY
12/08/42*		Montclair State	W 56-32	2-0	DeGray Gymnasium; Brooklyn, NY
12/12/42*		at Princeton	W 56-51	3-0	University Gymnasium; Princeton, NJ
12/17/42*		Clarkson	W 68-34	4-0	DeGray Gymnasium; Brooklyn, NY
12/19/42*		Oklahoma	W 51-34	5-0	Madison Square Garden; New York, NY
12/22/42*		Niagara	L 40-46	5-1	DeGray Gymnasium; Brooklyn, NY
12/26/42*		Tennessee	W 52-41	6-1	Madison Square Garden; New York, NY
01/06/43		vs. City College of New York	W 50-42	7-1 (1-0)	Madison Square Garden; New York, NY
01/09/43*		at Canisius	W 55-45	8-1	Buffalo Memorial Auditorium; Buffalo, NY
01/13/43		vs. Fordham	W 63-47	9-1 (2-0)	Madison Square Garden; New York, NY
01/28/43*		Camp Upton	W 47-39 ^{OT}	10-1	Madison Square Garden; New York, NY
02/05/43		Hofstra	W 47-38	11-1 (3-0)	DeGray Gymnasium; Brooklyn, NY
02/08/43*		St. Joseph's	W 76-46	12-1	Madison Square Garden; New York, NY
02/13/43*		at Temple	W 62-40	13-1	Convention Hall; Philadelphia, PA
02/15/43		vs. Manhattan	L 38-42	13-2 (3-1)	Madison Square Garden; New York, NY
02/19/43*		Manhattan Beach Coast Guard	W 52-45	14-2	DeGray Gymnasium; Brooklyn, NY
02/22/43*		Georgetown	W 65-43	15-2	Madison Square Garden; New York, NY
02/27/43*		Fort Dix	W 88-45	16-2	DeGray Gymnasium; Brooklyn, NY
03/03/43		vs. NYU	W 57-53	17-2 (4-1)	Madison Square Garden; New York, NY
03/10/43		vs. St. Francis (NY)	W 50-34	18-2 (5-1)	Madison Square Garden; New York, NY
NIT
03/22/43*		vs. Rice; NIT Quarterfinal	W 51-49	19-2	Madison Square Garden; New York, NY
03/27/43*		vs. Fordham; NIT Semifinal	W 69-43	20-2	Madison Square Garden; New York, NY
03/29/43*		vs. Toledo; NIT Championship	W 48-27	21-2	Madison Square Garden; New York, NY
Red Cross Benefit Game
04/01/43*		vs. Wyoming; Red Cross Benefit Game	L 47-52 ^{OT}	21-3	Madison Square Garden; New York, NY
*Non-conference game. ^{#}Rankings from AP Poll. (#) Tournament seedings in parentheses.
