= Al Moschetti =

American basketball player

Personal information
- Born: January 1, 1920 New York City, New York, U.S.
- Died: December 10, 2007 (aged 87) Horseheads, New York, U.S.
- Listed height: 6 ft 1 in (1.85 m)
- Listed weight: 180 lb (82 kg)

Career information
- High school: New Utrecht (Brooklyn, New York)
- College: St. John's (1940–1943)
- Playing career: 1943–1947
- Position: Forward

Career history

Playing
- 1943–1944: Arma Athletic Club
- 1944–1945: Sheboygan Red Skins
- 1945–1946: Honesdale
- 1946–1947: Elizabeth Braves

Coaching
- 19??–19??: Notre Dame HS

Career highlights
- NIT champion (1943)

Albert Vincent Moschetti (January 1, 1920 – December 10, 2007) was an American professional basketball player. He played in the National Basketball League for the Sheboygan Red Skins during the 1944–45 season and averaged 5.0 points per game. Moschetti also played in the American Basketball League. While in college, he played for the St. John's team that won the 1943 NIT.
