= 1942–43 Washington State Cougars men's basketball team =

American college basketball season

1942–43 Washington State Cougars men's basketball
- Conference: Pacific Coast Conference
- Record: 19–11 (9–7 PCC)
- Head coach: Jack Friel (15th season)
- Home arena: WSC Gymnasium

1942–43 Pacific Coast Conference men's basketball standings
	Conf.				Overall
Team	W		L	PCT	W		L	PCT
North
Washington †	12	–	4	.750	24	–	7	.774
Oregon	10	–	6	.625	19	–	10	.655
Washington State	9	–	7	.563	19	–	11	.633
Oregon State	8	–	8	.500	19	–	9	.679
Idaho	1	–	15	.063	14	–	20	.412
South
USC	7	–	1	.875	23	–	5	.821
UCLA	4	–	4	.500	14	–	7	.667
Stanford	4	–	4	.500	10	–	11	.476
California	1	–	7	.125	9	–	15	.375
† Conference playoff series winner

The 1942–43 Washington State Cougars men's basketball team represented Washington State College for the 1942–43 college basketball season. Led by fifteenth-year head coach Jack Friel, the Cougars were members of the Pacific Coast Conference and played their home games on campus at the WSC Gymnasium in Pullman, Washington.

The Cougars were 19–11 overall in the regular season and 9–7 in conference play, third in the Northern division.
