= 1942–43 Idaho Vandals men's basketball team =

American college basketball season

1942–43 Idaho Vandals men's basketball
- Conference: Pacific Coast Conference
- Record: 14–20 (1–15 PCC)
- Head coach: James "Babe" Brown (1st season)
- Home arena: Memorial Gymnasium

1942–43 Pacific Coast Conference men's basketball standings
	Conf.				Overall
Team	W		L	PCT	W		L	PCT
North
Washington †	12	–	4	.750	24	–	7	.774
Oregon	10	–	6	.625	19	–	10	.655
Washington State	9	–	7	.563	19	–	11	.633
Oregon State	8	–	8	.500	19	–	9	.679
Idaho	1	–	15	.063	14	–	20	.412
South
USC	7	–	1	.875	23	–	5	.821
UCLA	4	–	4	.500	14	–	7	.667
Stanford	4	–	4	.500	10	–	11	.476
California	1	–	7	.125	9	–	15	.375
† Conference playoff series winner

The 1942–43 Idaho Vandals men's basketball team represented the University of Idaho during the 1942–43 NCAA college basketball season. Members of the Pacific Coast Conference, the Vandals were led by first-year acting head coach James "Babe" Brown and played their home games on campus at Memorial Gymnasium in Moscow, Idaho.

The Vandals were 14–20 overall but just 1–15 in conference play; the sole win came against Oregon State in late January.
