= 1942–43 Holy Cross Crusaders men's basketball team =

American college basketball season

1942–43 Holy Cross Crusaders men's basketball
- Conference: Independent
- Record: 1–5
- Head coach: Hop Riopel (1st season)
- Captain: Stephen Murphy
- Home arena: N/A

The 1942–43 Holy Cross Crusaders men's basketball team represented The College of the Holy Cross during the 1942–43 NCAA men's basketball season. The head coach was Hop Riopel, coaching the Crusaders in his first season. The team finished with a final record of 1–5.

== Schedule ==
Date time, TV	Opponent	Result	Record	Site city, state
1/05/1943*	at Fordham	L 44–62	0–1	Rose Hill Gymnasium; Bronx, NY
1/16/1943*	at Brown	L 42–51	0–2	Marvel Gymnasium; Providence, RI
1/20/1943*	at Seton Hall	L 30–45	0–3	Walsh Gymnasium; South Orange, NJ
1/27/1943*	at Dartmouth	L 37–79	0–4	Alumni Gym; Hanover, NH
2/10/1943*	Clark	W 51–41	1–4	Worcester, MA
2/24/1943*	at Amherst	L 33–45	1–5	Amherst, MA
*Non-conference game. (#) Tournament seedings in parentheses.
