= 1942–43 Ohio Bobcats men's basketball team =

American college basketball season

1942–43 Ohio Bobcats men's basketball
- Conference: Independent
- Record: 11–7
- Head coach: Dutch Trautwein (5th season)
- Home arena: Men's Gymnasium

The 1942–43 Ohio Bobcats men's basketball team represented Ohio University in the college basketball season of 1942–43. The team was coached by Dutch Trautwein and played their home games at the Men's Gymnasium. They finished the season 11–7 .

== Schedule ==
Date time, TV	Rank^{#}	Opponent^{#}	Result	Record	Site (attendance) city, state
Regular Season
		Mount Union	L 36–42	0–1	
		Marietta	W 48–28	1–1	
		Cincinnati	W 51–37	2–1	
		at Cincinnati	W 48–33	3–1	
		at Ohio Wesleyan	W 53–37	4–1	
		at Dayton	L 32–45	4–2	
		Xavier	W 58–53	5–2	
		Dayton	W 66–53	6–2	
		Akron	L 70–72	6–3	
		Bowling Green	W 51–42	7–3	
		at Washington & Jefferson	L 31–37	7–4	
		at Muskingum	L 41–47	7–5	
		at Marietta	W 46–31	8–5	
		Dayton	W 45–43	9–5	
		Ohio Wesleyan	W 62–50	10–5	
		at Miami	W 41–40	11–5	
		at Xavier	L 41–57	11–6	
		Toledo	L 45–57	11–7	
*Non-conference game. ^{#}Rankings from AP Poll. (#) Tournament seedings in parentheses. All times are in Eastern Time.
