= 1942–43 La Salle Explorers men's basketball team =

American college basketball season

1942–43 La Salle Explorers men's basketball
- Conference: Independent
- Record: 13–10
- Head coach: Obie O'Brien (2nd season)
- Captain: Irc Reichman
- Home arena: Wister Hall

The 1942–43 La Salle Explorers men's basketball team represented La Salle University during the 1942–43 NCAA men's basketball season. The head coach was Obie O'Brien, coaching the Explorers in his second season. The team finished with an overall record of 13–10.

== Schedule ==
Date time, TV	Opponent	Result	Record	Site city, state
Dec. 4, 1942	Loyola (MD)	W 51–31	1–0	Wister Hall; Philadelphia, PA
Dec. 8, 1942	Fort Dix	W 43–31	2–0	Wister Hall; Philadelphia, PA
Dec 11, 1942	Millersville	W 50–34	3–0	Wister Hall; Philadelphia, PA
Dec. 16, 1942	Rider	W 60–33	4–0	Wister Hall; Philadelphia, PA
Dec. 20, 1942	Marshall	L 32–56	4–1	Wister Hall; Philadelphia, PA
Dec. 26, 1942	Wyoming	L 32–56	4–2	Wister Hall; Philadelphia, PA
Jan. 2, 1943	NC Aviat.	W 58–37	5–2	Wister Hall; Philadelphia, PA
Jan. 6, 1943	at Moravian	W 59–54	6–2	Bethlehem, PA
Jan. 8, 1943	at Aberdeen	L 33–42	6–3	
Jan. 13, 1943	Aberdeen	L 40–54	6–4	Wister Hall; Philadelphia, PA
Jan. 16, 1943	Saint Joseph's	L 45–48	6–5	Wister Hall; Philadelphia, PA
Jan. 20, 1943	Coast Guard	W 58–37	7–5	Wister Hall; Philadelphia, PA
Jan. 23, 1943	at Rider	W 42–38	8–5	Lawrence, NJ
Jan. 28, 1943	St. Francis (NY)	L 41–47	8–6	Wister Hall; Philadelphia, PA
Feb. 2, 1943	Arnold	W 83–48	9–6	Wister Hall; Philadelphia, PA
Feb. 6, 1943	Western Kentucky	L 44–52	9–7	Wister Hall; Philadelphia, PA
Feb. 9, 1942	Alumni	W 63–43	10–7	Wister Hall; Philadelphia, PA
Feb. 12, 1943	at Scranton	W 51–38	11–7	Scranton, PA
Feb. 20, 1943	Temple	L 43–47	11–8	Wister Hall; Philadelphia, PA
Feb. 23, 1943	at Seton Hall	L 27–38	11–9	Walsh Gymnasium; South Orange, NJ
Feb. 24, 1943	at Newark	W 50–35	12–9	
Feb. 27, 1943	Long Island	W 51–46	13–9	Wister Hall; Philadelphia, PA
Mar. 6, 1943	Toledo	L 46–68	13–10	Wister Hall; Philadelphia, PA
*Non-conference game. (#) Tournament seedings in parentheses.
