= University Auditorium (DePaul University) =

College auditorium/sports venue

- The Barn
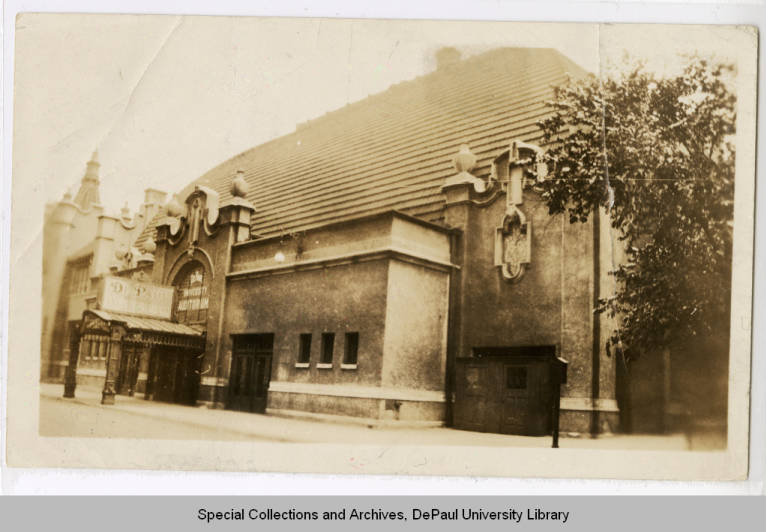
- Interactive map of University Auditorium
- Location: 2219 N. Sheffield Ave. Chicago, IL 60614
- Coordinates: 41.923°N 87.655°W
- Owner: DePaul University
- Operator: DePaul University

Construction
- Groundbreaking: 1906
- Opened: 1907
- Renovated: 1920
- Demolished: 1979
- Architect: John Pridmore

Tenant
- DePaul Blue Demons men's basketball (NCAA) (1923–1956)

University Auditorium or the College Theater Building and nicknamed "The Barn" was a multi-purpose arena and theater in Chicago on DePaul's Lincoln Park campus.

== History ==
Construction of University Auditorium began in 1906 and was completed in 1907. During World War I, the facility served as barracks for the Student Army Training Corps. In 1920, the venue was remodeled into a gymnasium and the DePaul Blue Demons men's basketball team first played in the facility in 1923. The team played in University Auditorium until 1956 with the team's last game being a 91-77 victory versus Lewis University on February 21, 1956. The Blue Demons had their longest home-court winning streak in school history with 81-straight wins at "The Barn". University Auditorium was replaced by Alumni Hall as the home venue of the men's basketball team on December 16, 1956. The venue caught fire in 1967 and was demolished in 1979. The Ray Meyer Fitness and Recreation Center is now located on the site of University Auditorium.
