= 1942–43 Wisconsin Badgers men's basketball team =

American college basketball season

1942–43 Wisconsin Badgers men's basketball
- Conference: Big Ten Conference
- Record: 12–9 (6–6 Big Ten)
- Head coach: Harold E. Foster
- Home arena: UW Fieldhouse

1942–43 Big Ten Conference men's basketball standings
	Conf.				Overall
Team	W		L	PCT	W		L	PCT
Illinois	12	–	0	1.000	17	–	1	.944
Indiana	11	–	2	.846	18	–	2	.900
Northwestern	7	–	5	.583	8	–	9	.471
Wisconsin	6	–	6	.500	12	–	9	.571
Purdue	6	–	6	.500	9	–	11	.450
Minnesota	5	–	7	.417	8	–	9	.471
Ohio State	5	–	7	.417	8	–	9	.471
Michigan	4	–	8	.333	10	–	8	.556
Iowa	3	–	9	.250	7	–	10	.412
Chicago	0	–	9	.000	0	–	21	.000

The 1942–43 Wisconsin Badgers men's basketball team represented University of Wisconsin–Madison. The head coach was Harold E. Foster, coaching his ninth season with the Badgers. The team played their home games at the UW Fieldhouse in Madison, Wisconsin and was a member of the Big Ten Conference.

== Schedule ==
Date time, TV	Rank^{#}	Opponent^{#}	Result	Record	Site city, state
Regular Season
12/05/1942*		Marquette	W 45–36	1–0	UW Fieldhouse; Madison, WI
12/12/1942*		Camp Grant (IL)	W 38–36	2–0	UW Fieldhouse; Madison, WI
12/14/1942*		at Notre Dame	L 59–61 ^{OT}	2–1	Notre Dame Fieldhouse; Notre Dame, IN
12/19/1942*		at Marquette	W 50–38	3–1	Marquette Gymnasium; Milwaukee, WI
12/21/1942*		Oklahoma	W 48–37	4–1	UW Fieldhouse; Madison, WI
12/31/1942*		vs. Harvard	W 58–41	5–1	Marquette Gymnasium; Milwaukee, WI
1/04/1943*		Hamline (MN)	W 41–37	6–1	UW Fieldhouse; Madison, WI
1/09/1943		vs. Northwestern	W 67–65	7–1 (1–0)	Chicago Stadium; Chicago, IL
1/11/1943		Illinois	L 40–52	7–2 (1–1)	UW Fieldhouse; Madison, WI
1/15/1943		at Michigan	L 34–38	7–3 (1–2)	Yost Field House; Ann Arbor, MI
1/16/1943		at Michigan	W 55–34	8–3 (2–2)	Yost Field House; Ann Arbor, MI
1/26/1943*		at Great Lakes (IL)	L 43–61	8–4	Waukegan, IL
1/30/1943		Minnesota	W 54–33	9–4 (3–2)	UW Fieldhouse; Madison, WI
2/06/1943*		Great Lakes (IL)	L 48–55	9–5	UW Fieldhouse; Madison, WI
2/08/1943		Chicago	W 74–30	10–5 (4–2)	UW Fieldhouse; Madison, WI
2/13/1943		Indiana	L 44–51	10–6 (4–3)	UW Fieldhouse; Madison, WI
2/15/1943		Indiana	W 57–53	11–6 (5–3)	UW Fieldhouse; Madison, WI
2/20/1943		at Illinois	L 26–50	11–7 (5–4)	Huff Hall; Champaign, IL
2/22/1943		Northwestern	L 54–56	11–8 (5–5)	UW Fieldhouse; Madison, WI
2/27/1943		at Purdue	W 53–45	12–8 (6–5)	Lambert Fieldhouse; West Lafayette, IN
3/01/1943		at Minnesota	L 34–48	12–9 (6–6)	Minnesota Field House; Minneapolis, MN
*Non-conference game. ^{#}Rankings from AP Poll. (#) Tournament seedings in parentheses.
