= 1942–43 Iowa State Cyclones men's basketball team =

American college basketball season

1942–43 Iowa State Cyclones men's basketball
- Conference: Big Six Conference
- Record: 7–9 (2–8 Big Six)
- Head coach: Louis Menze (15th season)
- Home arena: State Gymnasium

The 1942–43 Iowa State Cyclones men's basketball team represented Iowa State College in the 1942–43 college basketball season. The team was led by 15th-year head coach Louis Menze. In 1941–42, the Cyclones finished 11–6 overall (5–5 in the Big Six Conference). There were no captains for the season.

1942–43 Big Six Conference men's basketball standings
	Conf.				Overall
Team	W		L	PCT	W		L	PCT
Kansas	10	–	0	1.000	22	–	6	.786
Missouri	7	–	3	.700	18	–	9	.667
Oklahoma	5	–	5	.500	7	–	10	.412
Nebraska	5	–	5	.500	6	–	10	.375
Iowa State	2	–	8	.200	7	–	9	.438
Kansas State	1	–	9	.100	6	–	14	.300

== Roster ==
1942–43 Iowa State Cyclones men's basketball team
Players
Coaches

Pos.	#	Name	Height	Weight	Year	Hometown
		Milt Andrews	—	—		Oelwein, Iowa
		Dick Billes	—	—		Ames, Iowa
		Dean Driscoll	—	—		Aberdeen, South Dakota
F		Orlyn Fuerbach	—	—		Keystone, Iowa
G		Charles Gradoville	—	—		Des Moines, Iowa
F		Bob Hayes	—	—	Sr	Plattsmouth, Nebraska
		Bill Husted	—	—		Ames, Iowa
		Earl Kelso	5 ft 11 in (1.8 m)	—		Rochester, New York
C		Rollin Kuebler	—	—	Jr	Carroll, Iowa
		Bob Lindauer	—	—		Fairfield, Iowa
G		Royal Lohry	—	—
F		Mark Meis	—	—		Le Mars, Iowa
G		Reuben Mickelson	—	—	Jr	Thief River Falls, Minnesota
		Ron Norman	—	—		Fairfield, Iowa
		Gene Oulman	—	—		Mason City, Iowa
		Gene Phelps	—	—		Wells, Minnesota
		Keith Spiker	—	—		Philadelphia
F		Ray Wehde	—	—		Holstein, Iowa
F		Roy Wehde	6 ft 1 in (1.85 m)	—		Holstein, Iowa

Head coach

- Louis Menze

Assistant coach(es)

Legend

- (C) Team captain
- (S) Suspended
- (I) Ineligible
- (W) Walk-on
- Injured
- Current redshirt

== Player stats ==
Note: PPG = points per game

Player	Class	Pos	PPG
Ray Wehde	Fr	F	7.8
Ron Norman	So	G	6.5
Bob Hayes	Sr	F	5.8
Gene Phelps	So	G	5.7

== Schedule ==
Date time, TV	Rank^{#}	Opponent^{#}	Result	Record	Site city, state
Regular season
December 2, 1942*; 7:15 pm		Simpson	W 42–30	1–0	State Gymnasium; Ames, Iowa
December 7, 1942*		at Grinnell	L 30–37	1–1	Grinnell, Iowa
December 11, 1942*		Drake; Iowa Big Four	W 46–34	2–1	State Gymnasium; Ames, Iowa
January 1, 1943*		Iowa Teachers (Northern Iowa); Iowa Big Four	W 34–33	3–1	State Gymnasium; Ames, Iowa
January 9, 1943		Kansas State	W 34–24	4–1 (1–0)	State Gymnasium; Ames, Iowa
January 18, 1943; 7:15 pm		Nebraska	W 50–38	5–1 (2–0)	State Gymnasium; Ames, Iowa
January 23, 1943		at Missouri	L 34–52	5–2 (2–1)	Brewer Fieldhouse; Columbia, Missouri
January 29, 1943*; 8:15 pm		at Drake; Iowa Big Four	W 32–30	6–2	Drake Fieldhouse; Des Moines, Iowa
February 1, 1943		Oklahoma	L 37–46	6–3 (2–2)	State Gymnasium; Ames, Iowa
February 6, 1943		at Kansas	L 20–44	6–4 (2–3)	Hoch Auditorium; Lawrence, Kansas
February 8, 1943		at Oklahoma	L 20–47	6–5 (2–4)	OU Field House; Norman, Oklahoma
February 15, 1943		Kansas	L 29–37	6–6 (2–5)	State Gymnasium; Ames, Iowa
February 22, 1943		Missouri	L 28–31	6–7 (2–6)	State Gymnasium; Ames, Iowa
February 27, 1943		at Nebraska	L 36–51	6–8 (2–7)	Nebraska Coliseum; Lincoln, Nebraska
March 1, 1943		at Kansas State	L 36–43	6–9 (2–8)	Nichols Hall; Manhattan, Kansas
March 18, 1943*		at Iowa Pre-Flight	W 53–32	7–9	
*Non-conference game. ^{#}Rankings from AP poll. (#) Tournament seedings in parentheses. All times are in Central Time.
