= 1943 SEC men's basketball tournament =

- Classification: Division I
- Teams: 11
- Site: Jefferson County Armory; Louisville, Kentucky
- Champions: Tennessee (3rd title)
- Winning coach: John Mauer (2nd title)

1942–43 Southeastern Conference men's basketball standings
	Conf.				Overall
Team	W		L	PCT	W		L	PCT
Kentucky	8	–	1	.889	17	–	6	.739
LSU	11	–	2	.846	18	–	4	.818
Tennessee †	6	–	3	.667	14	–	4	.778
Mississippi State	13	–	7	.650	14	–	8	.636
Georgia Tech	7	–	4	.636	11	–	5	.688
Vanderbilt	9	–	7	.563	10	–	8	.556
Alabama	9	–	9	.500	10	–	10	.500
Ole Miss	6	–	8	.429	8	–	10	.444
Tulane	4	–	8	.333	4	–	9	.308
Georgia	1	–	8	.111	4	–	13	.235
Auburn	1	–	12	.077	1	–	14	.067
Florida	0	–	6	.000	8	–	7	.533
† Regular-season championship and SEC Tournament winner

The 1943 Southeastern Conference men's basketball tournament took place on February 25–27, 1943, in Louisville, Kentucky at the Jefferson County Armory. It was the tenth SEC basketball tournament.

Tennessee won the tournament by beating Kentucky in the championship game.

== Bracket ==
First Round
LSU	67
Auburn	38
Georgia	36
Ole Miss	27
Kentucky	48
Tulane	31

Quarterfinals
Alabama	41
LSU	46
Tennessee	41
Vanderbilt	31
Mississippi State	48
Georgia Tech	41
Georgia	30
Kentucky	59

Semifinals
LSU	34
Tennessee	52
Mississippi State	43
Kentucky	52

Finals
Tennessee	33
Kentucky	30
