= 1942–43 Washington Huskies men's basketball team =

American college basketball season

1942–43 Washington Huskies men's basketball

Pacific Coast Conference Champions

NCAA tournament, West regional fourth place
- Conference: Pacific Coast Conference
- Record: 24–7 (12–4 PCC)
- Head coach: Hec Edmundson (23rd season)
- Captain: Wally Leask
- Home arena: UW Pavilion

1942–43 Pacific Coast Conference men's basketball standings
	Conf.				Overall
Team	W		L	PCT	W		L	PCT
North
Washington †	12	–	4	.750	24	–	7	.774
Oregon	10	–	6	.625	19	–	10	.655
Washington State	9	–	7	.563	19	–	11	.633
Oregon State	8	–	8	.500	19	–	9	.679
Idaho	1	–	15	.063	14	–	20	.412
South
USC	7	–	1	.875	23	–	5	.821
UCLA	4	–	4	.500	14	–	7	.667
Stanford	4	–	4	.500	10	–	11	.476
California	1	–	7	.125	9	–	15	.375
† Conference playoff series winner

The 1942–43 Washington Huskies men's basketball team represented the University of Washington for the 1942–43 NCAA college basketball season. Led by 23rd-year head coach Hec Edmundson, the Huskies were members of the Pacific Coast Conference and played their home games on campus at the UW Pavilion in Seattle, Washington.

The Huskies were 22–5 overall in the regular season and 12–4 in conference play; first in the Northern division. The conference playoff series was hosted by the Huskies, and they swept favored USC in two games.

In the eight-team NCAA tournament, Washington played in the West Regional in Kansas City. They lost to Texas by four points, then fell to Oklahoma in the consolation game.

== Postseason results ==
Date time, TV	Opponent	Result	Record	Site (attendance) city, state
Pacific Coast Conference Playoff Series
Fri, March 12	USC; Game One	W 53–51	23–5	UW Pavilion (9,000); Seattle, Washington
Sat, March 13	USC; Game Two	W 52–45	24–5	UW Pavilion (9,500); Seattle, Washington
NCAA Tournament
Fri, March 26*	vs. Texas; Quarterfinal (West semifinal)	L 55–59	24–6	Municipal Auditorium (6,000); Kansas City, Missouri
Sat, March 27*	vs. Oklahoma; West Third Place game	L 43–48	24–7	Municipal Auditorium; Kansas City, Missouri
*Non-conference game. (#) Tournament seedings in parentheses. All times are in Pacific time.
