= 1942–43 Indiana Hoosiers men's basketball team =

American college basketball season

1942–43 Indiana Hoosiers men's basketball
- Conference: Big Ten Conference
- Record: 18–2 (11–2 Big Ten)
- Head coach: Branch McCracken (5th season)
- Captain: Irv Swanson
- Home arena: The Fieldhouse

1942–43 Big Ten Conference men's basketball standings
	Conf.				Overall
Team	W		L	PCT	W		L	PCT
Illinois	12	–	0	1.000	17	–	1	.944
Indiana	11	–	2	.846	18	–	2	.900
Northwestern	7	–	5	.583	8	–	9	.471
Wisconsin	6	–	6	.500	12	–	9	.571
Purdue	6	–	6	.500	9	–	11	.450
Minnesota	5	–	7	.417	8	–	9	.471
Ohio State	5	–	7	.417	8	–	9	.471
Michigan	4	–	8	.333	10	–	8	.556
Iowa	3	–	9	.250	7	–	10	.412
Chicago	0	–	9	.000	0	–	21	.000

The 1942–43 Indiana Hoosiers men's basketball team represented Indiana University. Their head coach was Branch McCracken, who was in his 5th and final year before taking a three-year leave of absence to serve in the Navy during World War II. The team played its home games in The Fieldhouse in Bloomington, Indiana, and was a member of the Big Ten Conference.

The Hoosiers finished the regular season with an overall record of 18–2 and a conference record of 11–2, finishing 2nd in the Big Ten Conference. Indiana was not invited to participate in any postseason tournament.

== Roster ==
No.	Name	Position	Ht.	Year	Hometown
4	Billy McGinnis	G	5–9	So.	Eminence, Indiana
5	Leroy Mangin	F	5–10	So.	Washington, Indiana
7	John Logan	F	6–1	Sr.	Richmond, Indiana
9	Bob Cowan	G	5–10	Fr.	Fort Wayne, Indiana
11	James Smith	F	6–2	Jr.	Shelbyville, Indiana
14	Irv Swanson	G	5–10	Sr.	LaPorte, Indiana
15	Roy Kilby	G	5–10	Jr.	Muncie, Indiana
16	Warren Lewis	F	6–1	Jr.	New Castle, Indiana
17	Ralph Hamilton	F	6–1	Jr.	Fort Wayne, Indiana
18	Ed Denton	C	6–2	Sr.	Jeffersonville, Indiana
19	Sam Young	G	6–2	Fr.	Rushville, Indiana
20	Ward Williams	C	6–3	So.	Colfax, Indiana
21	Dick Wittenbraker	G	6–2	Jr.	New Castle, Indiana
32	Maurice Stohler	F	6–1	So.	Anderson, Indiana
35	Bob Hines	C	6–2	Jr.	Fort Wayne, Indiana
39	Neil Funk	F	6–3	Jr.	LaPorte, Indiana
N/A	Maurice Hooper	G	5–10	So.	Anderson, Indiana
N/A	George Poolitson	F	6–1	So.	Bloomington, Indiana
N/A	Ed Schienbein	G	5–9	Jr.	Southport, Indiana
N/A	Sterling Scott	F	6–6	So.	Hammond, Indiana

== Schedule/results ==
Date time, TV	Rank^{#}	Opponent^{#}	Result	Record	Site city, state
Regular season
12/5/1942*		DePauw	W 57–40	1–0	The Fieldhouse; Bloomington, IN
12/7/1942*		Wabash	W 58–40	2–0	The Fieldhouse; Bloomington, IN
12/14/1942*		Fort Knox	W 64–19	3–0	The Field House; Bloomington, IN
12/23/1942*		vs. Kentucky; Indiana–Kentucky rivalry	W 58–52	4–0	Jefferson County Armory; Louisville, KY
12/28/1942*		at Loyola (Chicago)	W 51–43	5–0	Alumni Gym; Chicago, IL
12/30/1942*		at Nebraska	W 40–39	6–0	Nebraska Coliseum; Lincoln, NE
1/4/1943*		at Butler	W 42–27	7–0	Butler Fieldhouse; Indianapolis, IN
1/9/1943		Ohio State	W 45–37	8–0 (1–0)	The Fieldhouse; Bloomington, IN
1/11/1943		Ohio State	W 61–31	9–0 (2–0)	The Fieldhouse; Bloomington, IN
1/16/1943		at Chicago	W 55–27	10–0 (3–0)	Henry Crown Field House; Chicago, IL
1/23/1943		at Iowa	W 71–55	11–0 (4–0)	Iowa Field House; Iowa City, IA
1/25/1943		at Iowa	W 64–43	12–0 (5–0)	Iowa Field House; Iowa City, IA
1/30/1943		Purdue; Rivalry	W 53–35	13–0 (6–0)	The Fieldhouse; Bloomington, IN
2/6/1943		Michigan	W 32–24	14–0 (7–0)	The Fieldhouse; Bloomington, IN
2/8/1943		Michigan	W 48–33	15–0 (8–0)	The Fieldhouse; Bloomington, IN
2/13/1943		at Wisconsin	W 51–44	16–0 (9–0)	Wisconsin Field House; Madison, WI
2/15/1943		at Wisconsin	L 53–57	16–1 (9–1)	Wisconsin Field House; Madison, WI
2/20/1943		Minnesota	W 51–39	17–1 (10–1)	The Fieldhouse; Bloomington, IN
2/22/1943		Minnesota	W 40–28	18–1 (11–1)	The Fieldhouse; Bloomington, IN
3/1/1943		at Purdue; Rivalry	L 38–41	18–2 (11–2)	Lambert Fieldhouse; West Lafayette, IN
*Non-conference game. ^{#}Rankings from AP Poll. (#) Tournament seedings in parentheses.
