= 1942–43 Michigan Wolverines men's basketball team =

American college basketball season

1942–43 Michigan Wolverines men's basketball
- Conference: Big Ten Conference
- Record: 10–8 (4–8 Big Ten)
- Head coach: Bennie Oosterbaan
- Captain: James Mandler
- Home arena: Yost Field House

1942–43 Big Ten Conference men's basketball standings
	Conf.				Overall
Team	W		L	PCT	W		L	PCT
Illinois	12	–	0	1.000	17	–	1	.944
Indiana	11	–	2	.846	18	–	2	.900
Northwestern	7	–	5	.583	8	–	9	.471
Wisconsin	6	–	6	.500	12	–	9	.571
Purdue	6	–	6	.500	9	–	11	.450
Minnesota	5	–	7	.417	8	–	9	.471
Ohio State	5	–	7	.417	8	–	9	.471
Michigan	4	–	8	.333	10	–	8	.556
Iowa	3	–	9	.250	7	–	10	.412
Chicago	0	–	9	.000	0	–	21	.000

The 1942–43 Michigan Wolverines men's basketball team represented the University of Michigan in intercollegiate basketball during the 1942–43 season. The team finished the season in a tie for eight place in the Big Ten Conference with an overall record of 10–8 and 4–8 against conference opponents.

Bennie Oosterbaan was in his fifth year as the team's head coach. James Mandler was the team's leading scorer with 160 points in 18 games for an average of 8.9 points per game. Mandler, who had set a team scoring record with 230 points during the 1941–42 season, was also the team captain. Dave Strack, who was the team's second leading scorer, served as the head coach of the Michigan men's basketball team from 1960 to 1968. Bob Wiese, who was the team's third leading scorer, played professional football for the Detroit Lions from 1947 to 1948.

== Statistical leaders ==
Player	Pos.	Yr	G	FG	FT	RB	Pts	PPG
James Mandler			18	69	22		160	8.9
Dave Strack			18	49	14		112	6.2
Bob Wiese			15	31	8		70	4.7
Gerald Mullaney			15	28	11		67	4.6
Ralph Gilbert			16	24	10		58	3.6
Melvin Comin			13	17	21		55	4.2
Totals			18	296	119		711	39.5
