= 1942–43 Texas Longhorns men's basketball team =

American college basketball season

1942–43 Texas Longhorns men's basketball

Southwest Conference co-champions

NCAA Tournament, Final Four
- Conference: Southwest Conference
- Record: 19–7 (9–3 SWC)
- Head coach: H. C. "Bully" Gilstrap (1st season)
- Captain: Ed Price

The 1942–43 Texas Longhorns men's basketball team represented The University of Texas at Austin in intercollegiate basketball competition during the 1942–43 season. The Longhorns were led by first-year head coach H. C. "Bully" Gilstrap. The team finished the season with a 19–7 overall record and a 9–3 record in Southwest Conference play to win a share of the SWC championship. Texas advanced to the NCAA tournament for the second time, recording its first-ever Final Four appearance.

== Schedule and results ==
Coach: H. C. "Bully" Gilstrap; Overall record: 19–7; Southwest Conference record: 9–3; Southwest Conference standing: t-1st
Date	Opponent	Site	Result	Record
Regular season
Dec 4	Southwest Texas State	Gregory Gymnasium • Austin, Texas	W 47–27	1–0
Dec 8	at Southwest Texas State	? • San Marcos, Texas	W 56–47	2–0
Dec 15	at Kelly AFB	? • San Antonio, Texas	W 45–33	3–0
Dec 16	at San Antonio Aviation Cadet Center	? • San Antonio, Texas	W 41–27	4–0
Dec 17	at Randolph AFB	? • Universal City, Texas	W 58–36	5–0
Dec 18	at Randolph AFB	? • Universal City, Texas	W 46–32	6–0
Dec 19	at Corpus Christi Navy	? • Corpus Christi, Texas	L 50–55	6–1
Dec 28	vs. East Central (Ok.)	? • Oklahoma City, Oklahoma	W 55–51	7–1
Dec 29	vs. Arkansas	? • Oklahoma City, Oklahoma	L 44–66	7–2
Dec 29	vs. Oklahoma A&M	? • Oklahoma City, Oklahoma	W 45–36	8–2
Dec 31	vs. Maryville (Mo.)	? • Oklahoma City, Oklahoma	W 38–32	9–2
Jan 6	Rice*	Gregory Gymnasium • Austin, Texas	W 55–36	10–2 (1–0 SWC)
Jan 9	at Baylor*	? • Waco, Texas	W 41–32	11–2 (2–0)
Jan 13	SMU*	Gregory Gymnasium • Austin, Texas	W 41–37	12–2 (3–0)
Jan 16	at Texas A&M*	? • College Station, Texas	W 54–45	13–2 (4–0)
Jan 19	TCU*	Gregory Gymnasium • Austin, Texas	W 47–30	14–2 (5–0)
Feb 3	Corpus Christi Navy	Gregory Gymnasium • Austin, Texas	L 35–45	14–3
Feb 9	at Rice*	? • Houston, Texas	L 39–50	14–4 (5–1)
Feb 12	Arkansas	Gregory Gymnasium • Austin, Texas	W 45–31	15–4 (6–1)
Feb 13	Arkansas	Gregory Gymnasium • Austin, Texas	W 48–35	16–4 (7–1)
Feb 20	at TCU*	? • Fort Worth, Texas	L 44–49	16–5 (7–2)
Feb 22	at SMU*	? • Dallas, Texas	L 56–65	16–6 (7–3)
Feb 27	Baylor*	Gregory Gymnasium • Austin, Texas	W 51–38	17–6 (8–3)
Mar 3	Texas A&M*	Gregory Gymnasium • Austin, Texas	W 57–55	18–6 (9–3)
1943 NCAA tournament
Mar 26	Washington	Municipal Auditorium • Kansas City, Missouri; NCAA Quarterfinal (West Regional)	W 59–53	19–6
Mar 28	Wyoming	Municipal Auditorium • Kansas City, Missouri; NCAA Semifinal (West Regional)	L 54–58	19–7
*Southwest Conference game.
