= 1943 NCAA basketball tournament =

Edition of USA college basketball tournament

- Teams: 8
- Finals site: Madison Square Garden, New York City, New York
- Champions: Wyoming Cowboys (1st title, 1st title game, 1st Final Four)
- Runner-up: Georgetown Hoyas (1st title game, 1st Final Four)
- Semifinalists: DePaul Blue Demons (1st Final Four); Texas Longhorns (1st Final Four)
- Winning coach: Everett Shelton (1st title)
- MOP: Ken Sailors (Wyoming)
- Attendance: 56,876
- Top scorer: John Hargis (Texas) (59 points)

The 1943 NCAA basketball tournament involved eight schools playing in single-elimination play to determine the national champion of men's NCAA Division I college basketball. The 5th annual edition of the tournament began on March 24, 1943, and ended with the championship game on March 30, at Madison Square Garden in New York City. A total of nine games were played, including a third place game in each region. Top-ranked Illinois declined to participate in the NCAA tournament or NIT after three of its starters were drafted into the Army.

Wyoming, coached by Everett Shelton, won the national title with a 46–34 victory in the final game over Georgetown, coached by Elmer Ripley. Ken Sailors of Wyoming was named the tournament's Most Outstanding Player. The Cowboys were the first team in the 5-year history of the tournament to win after making a previous appearance in the tournament, having appeared in the 1941 tournament.

== Locations ==
Only two venues hosted the 1943 tournament:

=== Regionals ===
March 24 and 25
East Regional, Madison Square Garden, New York, New York (Host: Metropolitan New York Conference)
March 26 and 27
West Regional, Municipal Auditorium, Kansas City, Missouri (Host: Missouri Valley Conference)

=== Championship Game ===
March 30
Madison Square Garden, New York, New York (Host: Metropolitan New York Conference)

== Teams ==
East Regional - New York City
School	Coach	Conference	Record
Dartmouth	Osborne Cowles	EIBL	19–2
DePaul	Ray Meyer	Independent	18–4
Georgetown	Elmer Ripley	Independent	20–4
NYU	Howard Cann	Metropolitan New York	16–4

West Regional - Kansas City
School	Coach	Conference	Record
Oklahoma	Bruce Drake	Big Six	17–8
Texas	Bully Gilstrap	Southwest	18–6
Washington	Hec Edmundson	Pacific Coast	24–5
Wyoming	Everett Shelton	Mountain States	28–2

== Bracket ==
Quarterfinals
Georgetown	55
NYU	36
DePaul	46
Dartmouth	35
Texas	59
Washington	55
Wyoming	53
Oklahoma	50

Semifinals
Georgetown	53
DePaul	49
Texas	54
Wyoming	58

Finals
Georgetown	34
Wyoming	46

=== Regional third place ===
East Regional third place
NYU	49
Dartmouth	51

West Regional third place
Washington	43
Oklahoma	48

== See also ==
- 1943 National Invitation Tournament
- 1943 NAIA Basketball Tournament
