= 1943 National Invitation Tournament =

Annual NCAA basketball competition

Tournament details
- City: New York City
- Venue: Madison Square Garden
- Teams: 8

Final positions
- Champions: St. John's Redmen (1st title)
- Runners-up: Toledo Rockets
- Semifinalists: Washington & Jefferson Presidents; Fordham Rams

Awards
- MVP: Harry Boykoff (St. John's)

The 1943 National Invitation Tournament was the 1943 edition of the annual NCAA college basketball competition.

== Selected teams ==
Below is a list of the eight teams selected for the tournament.

- Creighton
- Fordham
- Manhattan
- Rice
- St. John's
- Toledo
- Washington & Jefferson
- Western Kentucky

== Bracket ==
Below is the tournament bracket.

Quarterfinals
St. John's	51
Rice	49
Fordham	60
Western Kentucky	58
Toledo	54
Manhattan	47
Washington & Jefferson	43
Creighton	42

Semifinals
St. John's	69
Fordham	43
Toledo	46
Washington & Jefferson	39

Finals
St. John's	48
Toledo	27

Third place game
Fordham	34
Washington & Jefferson	39

== See also ==
- 1943 NCAA basketball tournament
- 1943 NAIA Basketball Tournament
