= 1948–49 NCAA men's basketball season =

Men's collegiate basketball season

- Preseason AP No. 1: None
- NCAA Tournament: 1949
- Tournament dates: March 18 – 26, 1949
- National Championship: Hec Edmundson Pavilion; Seattle, Washington
- NCAA Champions: Kentucky Wildcats
- Helms National Champions: Kentucky Wildcats
- Other champions: San Francisco Dons (NIT)
- Player of the Year (Helms): Tony Lavelli, Yale Bulldogs

The 1948–49 NCAA men's basketball season began in December 1948, progressed through the regular season and conference tournaments, and concluded with the 1949 NCAA basketball tournament championship game on March 26, 1949, at Hec Edmundson Pavilion in Seattle, Washington. The Kentucky Wildcats won their second NCAA national championship with a 46–36 victory over the Oklahoma A&M Aggies.

== Rule changes ==
Coaches were permitted to speak to players during time-outs. Previously, under a rule in place since the 1910–11 season, no coaching of players had been permitted during the progress of a game.

== Season headlines ==
- The Associated Press (AP) Poll debuted. The first national poll for ranking college basketball teams, it was modeled after the AP college football poll, which had begun in the mid-1930s. It ranked the Top 20 teams, and continued to do so until the 1961–62 season, when it became a Top 10 poll.
- The Ohio Valley Conference began play, with six original members.
- The Border Conference began a hiatus from major college basketball competition, playing at the non-major level for two seasons. It would return to major competition in the 1950–51 season.
- The Middle Atlantic States Conference North disbanded at the end of the season.
- The National Invitation Tournament expanded from eight to 12 teams.
- Kentucky became the first team to finish the season ranked No. 1 in the AP Poll and go on to win the NCAA tournament.
- Jim Lacy of Loyola (Maryland) completed his collegiate career with 2,154 points, the first player to score 2,000 or more points in his career.

== Conference membership changes ==
| School | Former conference | New conference |
|---|---|---|
| Bradley Braves | Independent | Missouri Valley Conference |
| Creighton Bluejays | Missouri Valley Conference | Independent |
| Eastern Kentucky State Colonels | Independent | Ohio Valley Conference |
| Evansville Purple Aces | Non-major basketball program | Ohio Valley Conference |
| Louisville Cardinals | Independent | Ohio Valley Conference |
| Marshall Thundering Herd | Independent | Ohio Valley Conference |
| Morehead State Eagles | Non-major basketball program | Ohio Valley Conference |
| Murray State Racers | Non-major basketball program | Ohio Valley Conference |
| Tennessee Tech Golden Eagles | Non-major basketball program | Ohio Valley Conference |
| Western Kentucky State Hilltoppers | Independent | Ohio Valley Conference |

== Regular season ==
=== Conferences ===
==== Conference winners and tournaments ====
| Conference | Regular season winner | Conference player of the year | Conference tournament | Tournament venue (City) | Tournament winner |
|---|---|---|---|---|---|
| Big Seven Conference | Nebraska & Oklahoma | None selected | No Tournament | | |
| Big Ten Conference | Illinois | None selected | No Tournament | | |
| Eastern Intercollegiate Basketball League | Yale | None selected | No Tournament | | |
| Metropolitan New York Conference | Manhattan & St. John's | | No Tournament | | |
| Mid-American Conference | Cincinnati | None selected | No Tournament | | |
| Middle Atlantic States Conference North | Lafayette & Muhlenberg | | No Tournament | | |
| Missouri Valley Conference | Oklahoma A&M | None selected | No Tournament | | |
| Mountain States (Skyline) Conference | Wyoming | | No Tournament | | |
| Ohio Valley Conference | Western Kentucky State | None selected | 1949 Ohio Valley Conference men's basketball tournament | Jefferson County Armory (Louisville, Kentucky) | Western Kentucky State |
| Pacific Coast Conference | Oregon State (North); UCLA (South) | | No Tournament; Oregon State defeated UCLA in best-of-three conference championship playoff series | | |
| Southeastern Conference | Kentucky | None selected | 1949 SEC men's basketball tournament | Jefferson County Armory, (Louisville, Kentucky) | Kentucky |
| Southern Conference | NC State | None selected | 1949 Southern Conference men's basketball tournament | Duke Indoor Stadium (Durham, North Carolina) | NC State |
| Southwest Conference | Arkansas, Baylor, & Rice | None selected | No Tournament | | |
| Western New York Little Three Conference | Niagara | | No Tournament | | |
| Yankee Conference | Connecticut | None selected | No Tournament | | |

==== Conference standings ====
1948–49 Big Seven Conference men's basketball standings
| | Conf. | | | | Overall |
| Team | W | | L | PCT | W | | L | PCT |
|---|---|---|---|---|---|---|---|---|
| Nebraska | 9 | – | 3 | .750 | 16 | – | 10 | .615 |
| Oklahoma | 9 | – | 3 | .750 | 14 | – | 10 | .583 |
| Kansas State | 8 | – | 4 | .667 | 13 | – | 11 | .542 |
| Missouri | 6 | – | 6 | .500 | 11 | – | 13 | .458 |
| Colorado | 4 | – | 8 | .333 | 6 | – | 12 | .333 |
| Kansas | 3 | – | 9 | .250 | 12 | – | 12 | .500 |
| Iowa State | 3 | – | 9 | .250 | 8 | – | 14 | .364 |
Rankings from AP Poll

1948–49 Big Nine Conference men's basketball standings
| | Conf. | | | | Overall |
| Team | W | | L | PCT | W | | L | PCT |
|---|---|---|---|---|---|---|---|---|
| No. 4 Illinois | 10 | – | 2 | .833 | 21 | – | 4 | .840 |
| No. 6 Minnesota | 9 | – | 3 | .750 | 18 | – | 3 | .857 |
| Michigan | 7 | – | 5 | .583 | 15 | – | 6 | .714 |
| No. 20 Ohio State | 6 | – | 6 | .500 | 14 | – | 7 | .667 |
| Indiana | 6 | – | 6 | .500 | 14 | – | 8 | .636 |
| Purdue | 6 | – | 6 | .500 | 13 | – | 9 | .591 |
| Wisconsin | 5 | – | 7 | .417 | 12 | – | 10 | .545 |
| Iowa | 3 | – | 9 | .250 | 10 | – | 10 | .500 |
| Northwestern | 2 | – | 10 | .167 | 5 | – | 16 | .238 |
Rankings from AP Poll

1948–49 Eastern Intercollegiate Basketball League standings
| | Conf. | | | | Overall |
| Team | W | | L | PCT | W | | L | PCT |
|---|---|---|---|---|---|---|---|---|
| No. 11 Yale | 9 | – | 3 | .750 | 22 | – | 8 | .733 |
| Columbia | 8 | – | 4 | .667 | 14 | – | 6 | .700 |
| Pennsylvania | 8 | – | 4 | .667 | 15 | – | 8 | .652 |
| Princeton | 8 | – | 4 | .667 | 13 | – | 9 | .591 |
| Cornell | 5 | – | 7 | .417 | 11 | – | 15 | .423 |
| Dartmouth | 4 | – | 8 | .333 | 15 | – | 11 | .577 |
| Harvard | 0 | – | 12 | .000 | 3 | – | 20 | .130 |
Rankings from AP Poll

1948–49 Metropolitan New York Conference men's basketball standings
| | Conf. | | | | Overall |
| Team | W | | L | PCT | W | | L | PCT |
|---|---|---|---|---|---|---|---|---|
| Manhattan | 5 | – | 1 | .833 | 18 | – | 8 | .692 |
| St. John's | 5 | – | 1 | .833 | 15 | – | 9 | .625 |
| CCNY | 3 | – | 2 | .600 | 17 | – | 8 | .680 |
| NYU | 3 | – | 2 | .600 | 12 | – | 8 | .600 |
| St. Francis (NY) | 2 | – | 2 | .500 | 21 | – | 12 | .636 |
| Fordham | 1 | – | 5 | .167 | 9 | – | 16 | .360 |
| Brooklyn | 0 | – | 6 | .000 | 8 | – | 14 | .364 |
Rankings from AP Poll

1948–49 Mid-American Conference men's basketball standings
| | Conf. | | | | Overall |
| Team | W | | L | PCT | W | | L | PCT |
|---|---|---|---|---|---|---|---|---|
| Cincinnati | 9 | – | 1 | .900 | 23 | – | 5 | .821 |
| No. 18 Butler | 8 | – | 2 | .800 | 18 | – | 5 | .783 |
| Western Michigan | 4 | – | 6 | .400 | 12 | – | 10 | .545 |
| Western Reserve | 4 | – | 6 | .400 | 9 | – | 15 | .375 |
| Miami (Ohio) | 3 | – | 7 | .300 | 8 | – | 13 | .381 |
| Ohio | 2 | – | 8 | .200 | 6 | – | 16 | .273 |
Rankings from AP Poll

1948–49 Middle Atlantic States Conference North men's basketball standings
| | Conf. | | | | Overall |
| Team | W | | L | PCT | W | | L | PCT |
|---|---|---|---|---|---|---|---|---|
| Lafayette | 6 | – | 2 | .750 | 20 | – | 9 | .690 |
| Muhlenberg | 6 | – | 2 | .750 | 17 | – | 8 | .680 |
| Gettysburg | 5 | – | 3 | .625 | 16 | – | 10 | .615 |
| Lehigh | 3 | – | 5 | .375 | 7 | – | 11 | .389 |
| Bucknell | 0 | – | 8 | .000 | 2 | – | 18 | .100 |
Rankings from AP Poll

1948–49 Missouri Valley Conference men's basketball standings
| | Conf. | | | | Overall |
| Team | W | | L | PCT | W | | L | PCT |
|---|---|---|---|---|---|---|---|---|
| No. 2 Oklahoma A&M | 9 | – | 1 | .900 | 23 | – | 5 | .821 |
| No. 3 Saint Louis | 8 | – | 2 | .800 | 22 | – | 4 | .846 |
| No. 7 Bradley | 6 | – | 4 | .600 | 27 | – | 8 | .771 |
| Drake | 4 | – | 6 | .400 | 13 | – | 13 | .500 |
| Wichita State | 3 | – | 7 | .300 | 10 | – | 16 | .385 |
| Tulsa | 0 | – | 10 | .000 | 4 | – | 20 | .167 |
Rankings from AP Poll

1948–49 Mountain States Conference men's basketball standings
| | Conf. | | | | Overall |
| Team | W | | L | PCT | W | | L | PCT |
|---|---|---|---|---|---|---|---|---|
| No. 17 Wyoming | 15 | – | 5 | .750 | 25 | – | 10 | .714 |
| No. 12 Utah | 14 | – | 6 | .700 | 24 | – | 8 | .750 |
| Denver | 13 | – | 7 | .650 | 18 | – | 15 | .545 |
| BYU | 11 | – | 9 | .550 | 21 | – | 13 | .618 |
| Utah State | 4 | – | 16 | .200 | 10 | – | 21 | .323 |
| Colorado State | 3 | – | 17 | .150 | 14 | – | 21 | .400 |
Rankings from AP Poll

1948–49 Ohio Valley Conference men's basketball standings
| | Conf. | | | | Overall |
| Team | W | | L | PCT | W | | L | PCT |
|---|---|---|---|---|---|---|---|---|
| No. 5 Western Kentucky State† | 8 | – | 2 | .800 | 25 | – | 4 | .862 |
| Eastern Kentucky State | 7 | – | 3 | .700 | 17 | – | 4 | .810 |
| Louisville | 6 | – | 3 | .667 | 23 | – | 10 | .697 |
| Marshall | 2 | – | 2 | .500 | 16 | – | 12 | .571 |
| Evansville | 4 | – | 5 | .444 | 14 | – | 11 | .560 |
| Murray State | 3 | – | 9 | .250 | 13 | – | 12 | .520 |
| Morehead State | 2 | – | 7 | .222 | 14 | – | 9 | .609 |
| Tennessee Tech | 0 | – | 1 | .000 | 10 | – | 10 | .500 |
† Ohio Valley Conference Tournament winner Rankings from AP Poll

1948–49 Pacific Coast Conference men's basketball standings
| | Conf. | | | | Overall |
| Team | W | | L | PCT | W | | L | PCT |
|---|---|---|---|---|---|---|---|---|
North
| Oregon State † | 12 | – | 4 | .750 | 24 | – | 12 | .667 |
| Washington State | 8 | – | 8 | .500 | 21 | – | 9 | .700 |
| Oregon | 7 | – | 9 | .438 | 12 | – | 18 | .400 |
| Idaho | 7 | – | 9 | .438 | 17 | – | 15 | .531 |
| Washington | 6 | – | 10 | .375 | 11 | – | 15 | .423 |
South
| No. 15 UCLA | 10 | – | 2 | .833 | 22 | – | 7 | .759 |
| USC | 8 | – | 4 | .667 | 14 | – | 10 | .583 |
| Stanford | 5 | – | 7 | .417 | 19 | – | 9 | .679 |
| California | 1 | – | 11 | .083 | 14 | – | 19 | .424 |
† Conference playoff series winner Rankings from AP Poll

1948–49 Rocky Mountain Conference men's basketball standings
| | Conf. | | | | Overall |
| Team | W | | L | PCT | W | | L | PCT |
|---|---|---|---|---|---|---|---|---|
| Colorado State–Greeley | 7 | – | 1 | .875 | 13 | – | 4 | .765 |
| Colorado College | 6 | – | 2 | .750 | 7 | – | 9 | .438 |
| Montana State | 5 | – | 3 | .625 | 14 | – | 15 | .483 |
| Western State (CO) | 1 | – | 7 | .125 | 7 | – | 14 | .333 |
| Colorado Mines | 1 | – | 7 | .125 | 2 | – | 12 | .143 |

1948–49 Southeastern Conference men's basketball standings
| | Conf. | | | | Overall |
| Team | W | | L | PCT | W | | L | PCT |
|---|---|---|---|---|---|---|---|---|
| No. 1 Kentucky | 13 | – | 0 | 1.000 | 32 | – | 2 | .941 |
| No. 9 Tulane | 12 | – | 3 | .800 | 24 | – | 4 | .857 |
| Tennessee | 8 | – | 3 | .727 | 19 | – | 7 | .731 |
| Vanderbilt | 9 | – | 5 | .643 | 14 | – | 8 | .636 |
| LSU | 7 | – | 6 | .538 | 15 | – | 10 | .600 |
| Alabama | 9 | – | 9 | .500 | 13 | – | 12 | .520 |
| Georgia Tech | 7 | – | 9 | .438 | 11 | – | 13 | .458 |
| Georgia | 6 | – | 9 | .400 | 17 | – | 13 | .567 |
| Florida | 4 | – | 8 | .333 | 11 | – | 16 | .407 |
| Auburn | 5 | – | 11 | .313 | 9 | – | 15 | .375 |
| Ole Miss | 4 | – | 12 | .250 | 8 | – | 13 | .381 |
| Mississippi State | 3 | – | 12 | .200 | 4 | – | 13 | .235 |
† 1949 SEC Tournament winner Rankings from AP Poll

1948–49 Southern Conference men's basketball standings
| | Conf. | | | | Overall |
| Team | W | | L | PCT | W | | L | PCT |
|---|---|---|---|---|---|---|---|---|
| No. 13 North Carolina State† | 14 | – | 1 | .933 | 25 | – | 8 | .758 |
| William & Mary | 10 | – | 3 | .769 | 24 | – | 10 | .706 |
| North Carolina | 13 | – | 5 | .722 | 20 | – | 8 | .714 |
| George Washington | 9 | – | 4 | .692 | 18 | – | 8 | .692 |
| Davidson | 11 | – | 6 | .647 | 18 | – | 8 | .692 |
| South Carolina | 7 | – | 6 | .538 | 10 | – | 12 | .455 |
| Wake Forest | 7 | – | 7 | .500 | 11 | – | 13 | .458 |
| Maryland | 7 | – | 7 | .500 | 9 | – | 17 | .346 |
| Virginia Tech | 6 | – | 8 | .429 | 10 | – | 13 | .435 |
| Duke | 5 | – | 7 | .417 | 13 | – | 9 | .591 |
| Clemson | 6 | – | 9 | .400 | 10 | – | 11 | .476 |
| Washington and Lee | 5 | – | 9 | .357 | 10 | – | 12 | .455 |
| Richmond | 5 | – | 10 | .333 | 8 | – | 15 | .348 |
| Furman | 4 | – | 11 | .267 | 8 | – | 14 | .364 |
| VMI | 3 | – | 8 | .273 | 3 | – | 16 | .158 |
| The Citadel | 0 | – | 11 | .000 | 1 | – | 17 | .056 |
† Southern Conference Tournament winner Rankings from AP Poll

1948–49 Southwest Conference men's basketball standings
| | Conf. | | | | Overall |
| Team | W | | L | PCT | W | | L | PCT |
|---|---|---|---|---|---|---|---|---|
| Arkansas | 9 | – | 3 | .750 | 15 | – | 11 | .577 |
| Baylor | 9 | – | 3 | .750 | 14 | – | 10 | .583 |
| Rice | 9 | – | 3 | .750 | 13 | – | 11 | .542 |
| Texas | 7 | – | 5 | .583 | 17 | – | 7 | .708 |
| SMU | 5 | – | 7 | .417 | 11 | – | 13 | .458 |
| Texas A&M | 2 | – | 10 | .167 | 5 | – | 19 | .208 |
| TCU | 1 | – | 11 | .083 | 4 | – | 20 | .167 |
Rankings from AP Poll

1948–49 Western New York Little Three Conference men's basketball standings
| | Conf. | | | | Overall |
| Team | W | | L | PCT | W | | L | PCT |
|---|---|---|---|---|---|---|---|---|
| Niagara | 3 | – | 1 | .750 | 24 | – | 7 | .774 |
| Canisius | 2 | – | 2 | .500 | 16 | – | 12 | .571 |
| St. Bonaventure | 1 | – | 3 | .250 | 18 | – | 8 | .692 |
Rankings from AP Poll

1948–49 Yankee Conference men's basketball standings
| | Conf. | | | | Overall |
| Team | W | | L | PCT | W | | L | PCT |
|---|---|---|---|---|---|---|---|---|
| Connecticut | 7 | – | 1 | .875 | 19 | – | 6 | .760 |
| Rhode Island State | 5 | – | 1 | .833 | 16 | – | 6 | .727 |
| Vermont | 2 | – | 1 | .667 | 15 | – | 5 | .750 |
| Massachusetts | 2 | – | 2 | .500 | 6 | – | 12 | .333 |
| New Hampshire | 2 | – | 6 | .250 | 7 | – | 10 | .412 |
| Maine | 0 | – | 7 | .000 | 4 | – | 14 | .222 |

=== Major independents ===
A total of 43 college teams played as major independents. Villanova (23–4) had the best winning percentage (.852). San Francisco (25–5) and Loyola of Illinois (25–6) finished with the most wins.

Although not considered a major independent during the season, Hamline (28–3) played as an independent and was ranked No. 19 in the season's final AP Poll.

1948–49 NCAA men's basketball independents standings
| | Conf. | | | | Overall |
| Team | W | | L | PCT | W | | L | PCT |
|---|---|---|---|---|---|---|---|---|
| No. 14 Villanova | | – | | – | 23 | – | 4 | .852 |
| No. 8 San Francisco | | – | | – | 25 | – | 5 | .833 |
| No. 16 Loyola (Ill.) | | – | | – | 25 | – | 6 | .806 |
| No. 10 Bowling Green State | | – | | – | 24 | – | 7 | .774 |
| Duquesne | | – | | – | 17 | – | 5 | .773 |
| Siena | | – | | – | 22 | – | 7 | .759 |
| La Salle | | – | | – | 21 | – | 7 | .750 |
| West Virginia | | – | | – | 18 | – | 6 | .750 |
| Akron | | – | | – | 16 | – | 6 | .727 |
| Syracuse | | – | | – | 18 | – | 7 | .720 |
| Notre Dame | | – | | – | 17 | – | 7 | .708 |
| Holy Cross | | – | | – | 19 | – | 8 | .704 |
| Miami (Fla.) | | – | | – | 19 | – | 8 | .704 |
| Seton Hall | | – | | – | 16 | – | 8 | .667 |
| DePaul | | – | | – | 16 | – | 9 | .640 |
| Brown | | – | | – | 13 | – | 8 | .619 |
| Xavier | | – | | – | 16 | – | 10 | .615 |
| Colgate | | – | | – | 11 | – | 7 | .611 |
| Temple | | – | | – | 14 | – | 9 | .609 |
| LIU | | – | | – | 18 | – | 12 | .600 |
| Baldwin Wallace | | – | | – | 13 | – | 9 | .591 |
| Washington University | | – | | – | 13 | – | 9 | .591 |
| Navy | | – | | – | 12 | – | 9 | .571 |
| Virginia | | – | | – | 13 | – | 10 | .565 |
| Detroit | | – | | – | 12 | – | 10 | .545 |
| Rutgers | | – | | – | 14 | – | 12 | .538 |
| Dayton | | – | | – | 16 | – | 14 | .533 |
| St. Joseph's | | – | | – | 12 | – | 11 | .522 |
| Toledo | | – | | – | 13 | – | 12 | .520 |
| Boston College | | – | | – | 9 | – | 9 | .500 |
| Pittsburgh | | – | | – | 12 | – | 13 | .480 |
| Wayne | | – | | – | 11 | – | 13 | .458 |
| Saint Mary's | | – | | – | 13 | – | 17 | .433 |
| Army | | – | | – | 7 | – | 10 | .412 |
| Penn State | | – | | – | 7 | – | 10 | .412 |
| Creighton | | – | | – | 9 | – | 14 | .391 |
| Marquette | | – | | – | 8 | – | 13 | .381 |
| Georgetown | | – | | – | 9 | – | 15 | .375 |
| Santa Clara | | – | | – | 8 | – | 15 | .348 |
| Boston University | | – | | – | 6 | – | 12 | .333 |
| Valparaiso | | – | | – | 8 | – | 17 | .320 |
| John Carroll | | – | | – | 7 | – | 17 | .292 |
| Providence | | – | | – | 7 | – | 19 | .269 |
Rankings from AP Poll

=== Informal championships ===
| Conference | Regular season winner | Conference player of the year | Conference tournament | Tournament venue (City) | Tournament winner |
|---|---|---|---|---|---|
| Middle Three Conference | Rutgers | None selected | No Tournament | | |

NOTE: Despite its name, the Middle Three Conference was an informal scheduling alliance rather than a true conference, and its members played as independents. In play among the three member schools in 1948–49, Rutgers finished with a 3–1 record.

== Post-season tournaments ==
=== NCAA tournament ===
==== Semifinals & finals ====
National semifinals
Illinois | 47
Kentucky | 76
Oklahoma A&M | 55
Oregon State | 30

National Finals
Kentucky | 46
Oklahoma A&M | 36
Third place
Illinois | 57
Oregon State | 53

=== National Invitation tournament ===
==== Semifinals & finals ====
Semifinals
Loyola (Ill.) | 55
Bradley | 50
San Francisco | 49
Bowling Green State | 39

Finals
Loyola (Ill.) | 47
San Francisco | 48
Third place
Bradley | 77
Bowling Green State | 82

== Awards ==
=== Consensus All-American teams ===
Consensus First Team
| Player | Position | Class | Team |
|---|---|---|---|
| Ralph Beard | G | Senior | Kentucky |
| Vince Boryla | F | Junior | Denver |
| Alex Groza | C | Senior | Kentucky |
| Tony Lavelli | F | Senior | Yale |
| Ed Macauley | F | Senior | Saint Louis |

Consensus Second Team
| Player | Position | Class | Team |
|---|---|---|---|
| Bill Erickson | G | Junior | Illinois |
| Vern Gardner | F | Senior | Utah |
| Wallace Jones | F | Senior | Kentucky |
| Jim McIntyre | C | Senior | Minnesota |
| Ernie Vandeweghe | G | Senior | Colgate |

=== Major player of the year awards ===
- Helms Player of the Year: Tony Lavelli, Yale

=== Other major awards ===
- NIT/Haggerty Award (Top player in New York City metro area): Dick McGuire, St. John's

== Coaching changes ==
A number of teams changed coaches during the season and after it ended.

| Team | Former Coach | Interim Coach | New Coach | Reason |
|---|---|---|---|---|
| Arkansas | Eugene Lambert | | Presley Askew | |
| Auburn | Danny Doyle | | Joel Eaves | |
| Boston University | Charles Cummings | | Vin Cronin | |
| BYU | Floyd Millet | | Stan Watts | |
| Colgate | Karl J. Lawrence | | Howard Hartman | |
| Colorado State | E. D. Taylor | | Bebe Lee | |
| Davidson | Norman Shepard | | Boydson Baird | Shepard left to coach Harvard. |
| Denver | Ellison Ketchum | | Hoyt Brawner | |
| Furman | Lyles Alley | | Melvin Bell | |
| George Washington | George Garber | | Bill Reinhart | |
| Georgetown | Elmer Ripley | | Buddy O'Grady | |
| Harvard | Bill Barclay | | Norman Shepard | |
| John Carroll | Norb Rascher | | Elmer Ripley | |
| Lafayette | Bill Anderson | | Ray Stanley | |
| La Salle | Charles McGlone | | Ken Loeffler | |
| Maine | George E. Allen | | Rome Rankin | |
| Miami (Ohio) | Blue Foster | | John Brickels | |
| Ohio | Dutch Trautwein | | Jim Snyder | |
| Ole Miss | Jim Whatley | | B. L. Graham | |
| Penn State | John Lawther | | Elmer Gross | |
| Providence | Lawrence Drew | | James Cuddy | |
| Rice | Joe Davis | | Don Suman | |
| Seton Hall | Jack Reitmeier | | Honey Russell | |
| Tulsa | John Garrison | | Clarence Iba | |
| Valparaiso | Don Warnke | | Wilbur Allen | |
| VMI | Frank Summers | | Bill O'Hara | |
| Washington & Lee | Bob Spessard | | Conn Davis | |
| Western Michigan | Buck Read | | William Pergio | |
