= 1949 NCAA basketball championship game =

1949 NCAA Tournament Championship Game
National championship game
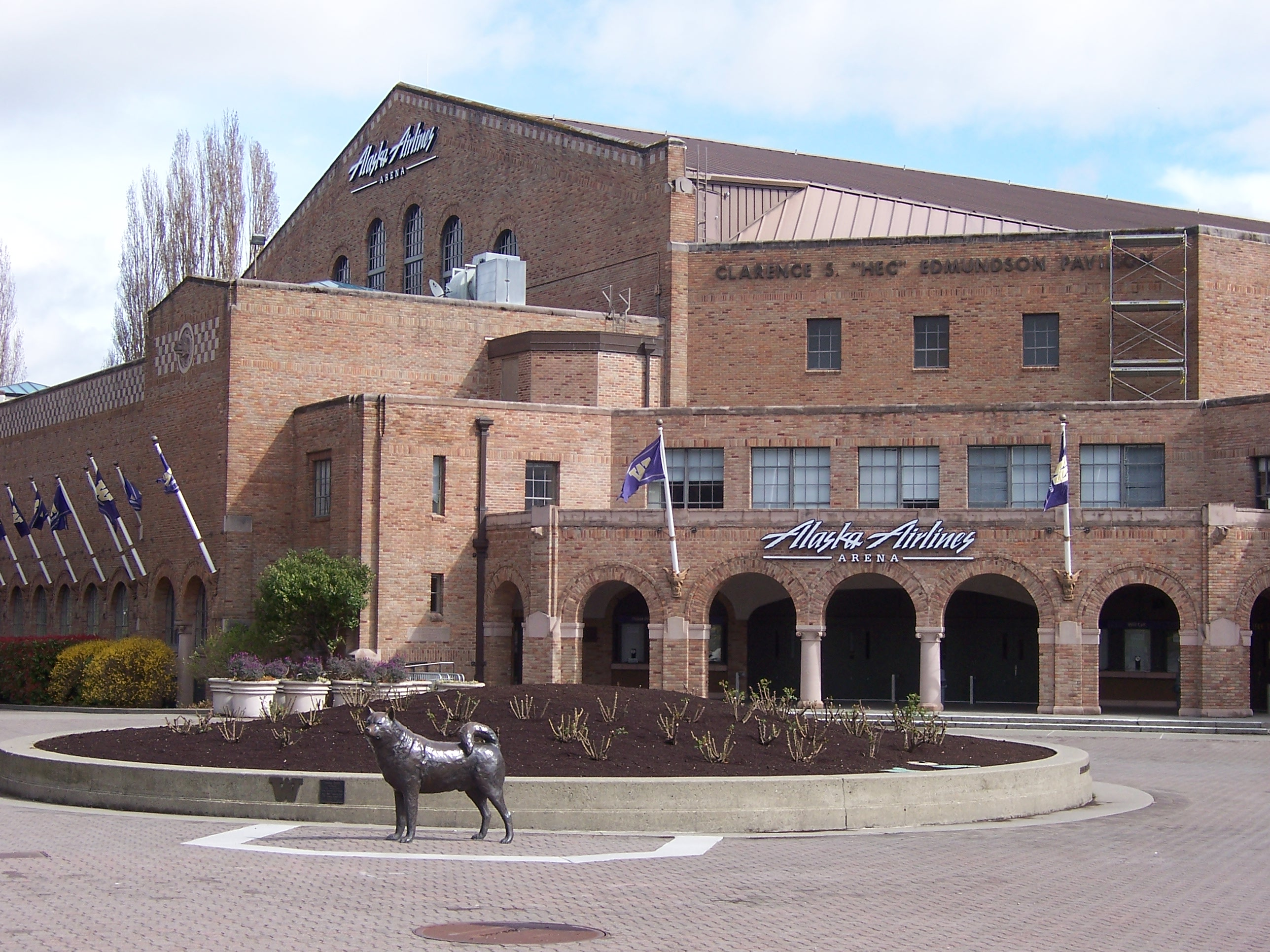
- The Hec Edmundson Pavilion in Seattle, Washington, hosted the championship game.
Oklahoma A&M Aggies	Kentucky Wildcats
MVC	SEC
(23-4)	(31-2)
36	46
Head coach: Henry Iba	Head coach: Adolph Rupp
- AP: 2
- AP: 1
	1st half	2nd half	Total
Oklahoma A&M Aggies	20	16	36
Kentucky Wildcats	25	21	46
- Date: March 26, 1949
- Venue: Hec Edmundson Pavilion, Seattle, Washington
- MVP: Alex Groza, Kentucky

The 1949 NCAA University Division Basketball Championship Game was the finals of the 1949 NCAA basketball tournament and it determined the national champion for the 1948-49 NCAA men's basketball season. The game was played on March 26, 1949, at Hec Edmundson Pavilion in Seattle, Washington. It featured the defending national champion Kentucky Wildcats of the Southeastern Conference, and the Oklahoma A&M Aggies of the Missouri Valley Conference.

== Participating teams ==
=== Oklahoma A&M Aggies ===
- West
  - Oklahoma A&M 40, Wyoming 39
- Final Four
  - Oklahoma A&M 55, Oregon State 30

=== Kentucky Wildcats ===
- East
  - Kentucky 85, Villanova 72
- Final Four
  - Kentucky 76, Illinois 47

== Game summary ==
March 26, 1949

#1 Kentucky Wildcats 46, #2 Oklahoma A&M Aggies 36
Scoring by half: 25-20, 21-16
Pts: Alex Groza 25	Pts: Jack Shelton 12

Hec Edmundson Pavilion, Seattle, Washington
