= 1948–49 Arkansas Razorbacks men's basketball team =

American college basketball season

1948–49 Arkansas Razorbacks men's basketball

Southwest Conference Champions

NCAA tournament, Elite Eight
- Conference: Southwest Conference
- Record: 15–11 (9–3 SWC)
- Head coach: Eugene Lambert (7th season)
- Home arena: Men's Gymnasium

1948–49 Southwest Conference men's basketball standings
| | Conf. | | | | Overall |
| Team | W | | L | PCT | W | | L | PCT |
|---|---|---|---|---|---|---|---|---|
| Arkansas | 9 | – | 3 | .750 | 15 | – | 11 | .577 |
| Baylor | 9 | – | 3 | .750 | 14 | – | 10 | .583 |
| Rice | 9 | – | 3 | .750 | 13 | – | 11 | .542 |
| Texas | 7 | – | 5 | .583 | 17 | – | 7 | .708 |
| SMU | 5 | – | 7 | .417 | 11 | – | 13 | .458 |
| Texas A&M | 2 | – | 10 | .167 | 5 | – | 19 | .208 |
| TCU | 1 | – | 11 | .083 | 4 | – | 20 | .167 |
Rankings from AP Poll

The 1948–49 Arkansas Razorbacks men's basketball team represented the University of Arkansas in the 1948–49 college basketball season. The Razorbacks played their home games in the Men's Gymnasium in Fayetteville, Arkansas. It was former Razorback All-American Eugene Lambert's seventh and final season as head coach of the Hogs. Arkansas received its first-ever rating in the new AP Poll (which was first published on January 18, 1949) on February 28, 1949, coming in at #20. The Razorbacks tied Baylor and Rice for the Southwest Conference regular season championship with a record of 9–3 and 15–11 overall.

Arkansas received a bid to the NCAA tournament, its third appearance in the tournament overall and second with Lambert as coach after advancing to the 1945 Final Four and not being able to participate during the 1943–44 season due to a serious car crash that killed a staff member, Everett Norris, and injured two starters, Deno Nichols and Ben Jones. Arkansas lost to Oregon State in the first round of the tournament, the Razorbacks' first-ever loss in the first round, before going on to defeat #17 Wyoming in a consolation game, the Hogs' first game and win against an AP-ranked team.

Guard Kenneth Kearns was named First Team All-SWC for the season, going on to be drafted by the New York Knicks in the 1949 BAA Draft.

Coach Eugene Lambert moved on after the end of the season, entering sports administration before coaching stints at Memphis State and Alabama, eventually settling as the athletic director at Memphis State.

== Roster ==
Roster retrieved from HogStats.com.

1948–49 Arkansas Razorbacks men's basketball team
Players
Coaches

| Pos. | # | Name | Height | Weight | Year | Previous school | Hometown |
|---|---|---|---|---|---|---|---|
| C | 11 | Bob Ambler | 6 ft 8 in (2.03 m) | 225 lb (102 kg) | So | N/A | Texarkana, Arkansas |
| G | 40 | Kenneth Kearns | — | — | Sr | Denton High School | Denton, Texas |
| G | 21 | Cliff Horton | 6 ft 3 in (1.91 m) | — | Sr | N/A | Marshall, Arkansas |
| F | 14 | Jim Cathcart | 6 ft 4 in (1.93 m) | 205 lb (93 kg) | Jr | Little Rock Central High School | Little Rock, Arkansas |
| G | 3 | John Campbell | 5 ft 6 in (1.68 m) | — | Sr | Harrison High School | Harrison, Arkansas |
| | 41 | Bob Williams | 6 ft 0 in (1.83 m) | — | So | N/A | Billings, Missouri |
| G | 31 | Gerald Hudspeth | — | — | Jr | St. Joe High School | St. Joe, Arkansas |
| | 15 | Mike Schumchyk | — | — | | Center Moriches | Long Island, New York |
| G | 32 | Norman Price | 6 ft 3 in (1.91 m) | — | So | N/A | Mansfield, Arkansas |
| | 55 | Roxie Rankin | — | — | | Fayetteville High School | Fayetteville, Arkansas |
| | 22 | Paul Coleman | — | — | | N/A | Marion, Arkansas |
| | 30 | Robert Adams | 6 ft 1 in (1.85 m) | — | Jr | N/A | Mulberry, Arkansas |
| | 35 | Elmo Adams | 6 ft 5 in (1.96 m) | — | | Beebe High School | Beebe, Arkansas |

Head coach

Eugene Lambert (Arkansas)

Assistant coach(es)

Legend

- (C) Team captain
- (S) Suspended
- (I) Ineligible
- (W) Walk-on
- Injured
- Current redshirt

Roster
Last update: August 16, 2022

== Schedule and results ==
Schedule retrieved from HogStats.com.

| Date time, TV | Rank^{#} | Opponent^{#} | Result | Record | Site city, state |
Regular season
| November 29, 1948* | | at Phillips 66ers | L 40–58 | 0–1 | Bartlesville, Oklahoma |
| December 1, 1948 | | Oklahoma City | W 31–29 | 1–1 | Men's Gymnasium; Fayetteville, Arkansas |
| December 4, 1948* | | at Oklahoma A&M | L 28–53 | 1–2 | Gallagher Hall; Stillwater, Oklahoma |
| December 9, 1948* | | vs. Long Island University | L 42–56 | 1–3 | Madison Square Garden; New York, New York |
| December 11, 1948* | | at Canisius | L 51–60 | 1–4 | Buffalo Memorial Auditorium; Buffalo, New York |
| December 13, 1948* | | at Kentucky | L 39–76 | 1–5 | Alumni Gymnasium; Lexington, Kentucky |
| December 16, 1948* | | Kansas State Teachers College of Pittsburg | W 79–53 | 2–5 | Men's Gymnasium; Fayetteville, Arkansas |
| December 23, 1948* | | Oklahoma A&M | L 45–50 | 2–6 | Men's Gymnasium; Fayetteville, Arkansas |
| December 30, 1948* | | vs. Tennessee; Delta Bowl Classic | W 58–55 | 3–6 | Memphis, Tennessee |
| January 5, 1949 | | Baylor | L 37–41 | 3–7 (0–1) | Men's Gymnasium; Fayetteville, Arkansas |
| January 8, 1949* | | Phillips 66ers | L 32–58 | 3–8 (0–1) | Little Rock, Arkansas |
| January 15, 1949 | | at SMU | W 54–45 | 4–8 (1–1) | Perkins Gymnasium; Dallas, Texas |
| January 17, 1949 | | at TCU | W 41–36 | 5–8 (2–1) | TCU Fieldhouse; Fort Worth, Texas |
| January 21, 1949 | | Rice | L 48–49 | 5–9 (2–2) | Men's Gymnasium; Fayetteville, Arkansas |
| January 31, 1949 | | Texas A&M | W 62–47 | 6–9 (3–2) | Men's Gymnasium; Fayetteville, Arkansas |
| February 5, 1949 | | at Baylor | W 52–46 | 7–9 (4–2) | Marrs McLean Gymnasium; Waco, Texas |
| February 7, 1949 | | at Texas | W 60–54 | 8–9 (5–2) | Gregory Gymnasium; Austin, Texas |
| February 12, 1949 | | Texas | W 54–50 | 9–9 (6–2) | Men's Gymnasium; Fayetteville, Arkansas |
| February 19, 1949 | | SMU | W 47–39 | 10–9 (7–2) | Men's Gymnasium; Fayetteville, Arkansas |
| February 21, 1949 | | TCU | W 67–52 | 11–9 (8–2) | Men's Gymnasium; Fayetteville, Arkansas |
| February 26, 1949 | | at Rice | L 48–54 | 11–10 (8–3) | Houston, Texas |
| February 28, 1949 | No. 20 | at Texas A&M | W 61–46 | 12–10 (9–3) | DeWare Fieldhouse; College Station, Texas |
NCAA District 6 Playoffs
| March 9, 1949* | | vs. Rice | W 50–34 | 13–10 (9–3) | Fair Park Recreation Building; Dallas, Texas |
| March 10, 1949* | | vs. Arizona | W 65–44 | 14–10 (9–3) | Fair Park Recreation Building; Dallas, Texas |
NCAA Tournament
| March 18, 1949* | | vs. Oregon State; NCAA Tournament Elite Eight | L 38–56 | 14–11 (9–3) | Kansas City, Missouri |
| March 19, 1949* | | vs. No. 17 Wyoming; NCAA Tournament Consolation Game | W 61–48 | 15–11 (9–3) | Kansas City, Missouri |
*Non-conference game. ^{#}Rankings from AP Poll. (#) Tournament seedings in parentheses. All times are in Central Time.
