= Far West Classic =

College basketball event in Portland, Oregon

- Sport: College basketball
- Founded: 1956
- Founder: Slats Gill
- Folded: 2015
- Country: United States
- Venues: Veterans Memorial Coliseum; Moda Center; Gill Coliseum
- Most titles: Oregon State

The Far West Classic was an annual college basketball tournament in Portland, Oregon, hosted by Oregon State and the University of Oregon. Founded in 1956 by the Beavers, it moved to Portland in 1960, and was last played in 2015. Prior to NCAA rules changes, it was one of the popular holiday tournaments each year.

== History ==
Oregon State coach Slats Gill started the tournament in 1956 with a four-team tournament in Corvallis at the school's home arena, Gill Coliseum. In 1959, the Ducks joined as a co-host, and the tournament was expanded to eight teams. The following year the Far West Classic moved to Portland when the new Veterans Memorial Coliseum opened. The 1989 tournament was the final one with eight teams, and after a year off, it returned with four teams in 1991. The last regular tournament was held in 1996, before returning in December 2015 with five teams, playing at the Moda Center. The 2015 tournament was cohosted by OSU and the University of Portland. Former sponsors of the games included Oregon retailers Thriftway, G.I. Joe's, and Fred Meyer.

== Titles ==
OSU won 20 titles, including the first ten. Gary Payton was the tournament MVP three times, the tournament record.

== See also ==
- Phil Knight Invitational
