= 1948–49 Kansas Jayhawks men's basketball team =

American college basketball season

1948–49 Kansas Jayhawks men's basketball
- Conference: Big Eight Conference|Big Seven Conference
- Record: 12–12 (3–9 Big 7)
- Head coach: Phog Allen (32nd season)
- Captain: William Sapp
- Home arena: Hoch Auditorium

1948–49 Big Seven Conference men's basketball standings
	Conf.				Overall
Team	W		L	PCT	W		L	PCT
Nebraska	9	–	3	.750	16	–	10	.615
Oklahoma	9	–	3	.750	14	–	10	.583
Kansas State	8	–	4	.667	13	–	11	.542
Missouri	6	–	6	.500	11	–	13	.458
Colorado	4	–	8	.333	6	–	12	.333
Kansas	3	–	9	.250	12	–	12	.500
Iowa State	3	–	9	.250	8	–	14	.364
Rankings from AP Poll

The 1948–49 Kansas Jayhawks men's basketball team represented the University of Kansas during the 1948–49 college men's basketball season.

== Roster ==
- Clinton Bull
- Guy Mabry
- Jerry Waugh
- Claude Houchin
- William Sapp
- Dale Engel
- Charles Penny
- Lynwood Smith
- Maurice Martin
- Gene Petersen
- Harold England
- David Dennis

== Schedule ==
Date time, TV	Rank^{#}	Opponent^{#}	Result	Record	Site city, state
December 4*		at Rockhurst	W 67–20	1-0	Municipal Auditorium; Kansas City, MO
December 8*		Trinity	W 63–44	2-0	Hoch Auditorium; Lawrence, KS
December 13*		at Purdue	L 46–47	2-1	Lambert Fieldhouse; West Lafayette, IN
December 18*		at Drake	L 44–60	2-2	Drake Fieldhouse; Des Moines, IA
December 23*		Centenary	W 49–41	3-2	Hoch Auditorium; Lawrence, KS
December 28		vs. Missouri; Border War	W 62–50	4-2	Municipal Auditorium; Kansas City, MO
December 29*		vs. Kansas State; Sunflower Showdown	W 60–46	5-2	Municipal Auditorium; Kansas City, MO
December 30		vs. Oklahoma	L 49–52	5-3	Municipal Auditorium; Kansas City, MO
January 4		at Oklahoma	L 36–38	5-4 (0-1)	Field House; Norman, OK
January 8		at Nebraska	L 34–52	5-5 (0-2)	Nebraska Coliseum; Lincoln, NE
January 11		Missouri; Border War	W 42–35	6-5 (1-2)	Hoch Auditorium; Lawrence, KS
January 15		at Washington University (MO)	W 46–41	7-5	WU Field House; St. Louis, MO
January 17		Colorado	L 30–42	7-6 (1-3)	Hoch Auditorium; Lawrence, KS
January 19		Drake	W 62–37	8-6	Hoch Auditorium; Lawrence, KS
January 29*		Creighton	W 79–50	9-6	Hoch Auditorium; Lawrence, KS
February 5		at Iowa State	W 62–57	10-6 (2-3)	The Armory; Ames, IA
February 9		Kansas State; Sunflower Showdown	L 48–53	10-7 (2-4)	Hoch Auditorium; Lawrence, KS
February 12		Nebraska	L 39–49	10-8 (2-5)	Hoch Auditorium; Lawrence, KS
February 15		at Missouri; Border War	W 55–37	11-8 (3-5)	Brewer Fieldhouse; Columbia, MO
February 19*		Washington University (MO)	W 43–39	12-8	Hoch Auditorium; Lawrence, KS
February 24		at Kansas State; Sunflower Showdown	L 36–63	12-9 (3-6)	Nichols Hall; Manhattan, KS
February 28		at Colorado	L 43–50	12-10 (3-7)	Balch Fieldhouse; Boulder, CO
March 3		Oklahoma	L 45–55	12-11 (3-8)	Hoch Auditorium; Lawrence, KS
March 8		Iowa State	L 45–49	12-12 (3-9)	Hoch Auditorium; Lawrence, KS
*Non-conference game. ^{#}Rankings from AP Poll. (#) Tournament seedings in parentheses.
