= 1948–49 Iowa State Cyclones men's basketball team =

American college basketball season

1948–49 Iowa State Cyclones men's basketball
- Conference: Big Seven Conference
- Record: 8–14 (3–9 Big Seven)
- Head coach: Clay Sutherland (2nd season)
- Assistant coach: L.C. (Cap) Timm
- Home arena: Iowa State Armory

1948–49 Big Seven Conference men's basketball standings
| | Conf. | | | | Overall |
| Team | W | | L | PCT | W | | L | PCT |
|---|---|---|---|---|---|---|---|---|
| Nebraska | 9 | – | 3 | .750 | 16 | – | 10 | .615 |
| Oklahoma | 9 | – | 3 | .750 | 14 | – | 10 | .583 |
| Kansas State | 8 | – | 4 | .667 | 13 | – | 11 | .542 |
| Missouri | 6 | – | 6 | .500 | 11 | – | 13 | .458 |
| Colorado | 4 | – | 8 | .333 | 6 | – | 12 | .333 |
| Kansas | 3 | – | 9 | .250 | 12 | – | 12 | .500 |
| Iowa State | 3 | – | 9 | .250 | 8 | – | 14 | .364 |
Rankings from AP Poll

The 1948–49 Iowa State Cyclones men's basketball team represented Iowa State University during the 1948–49 NCAA men's basketball season. The Cyclones were coached by Clay Sutherland, who was in his second season with the Cyclones. They played their home games at the Iowa State Armory in Ames, Iowa.

They finished the season 8–14, 3–9 in Big Seven play to finish in a tie for sixth place.

== Roster ==
1948–49 Iowa State Cyclones men's basketball team
Players
Coaches

| Pos. | # | Name | Height | Weight | Year | Hometown |
|---|---|---|---|---|---|---|
| F | 43 | Gay Anderson | 6 ft 5 in (1.96 m) | — | So | Council Bluffs, Iowa |
| C | | Bob Boyce | 6 ft 3 in (1.91 m) | — |
| G | | Gene Culman | 6 ft 3 in (1.91 m) | — | | Mason City, Iowa |
| G | 4 | Don Ferguson | 5 ft 7 in (1.7 m) | — | | Ottumwa, Iowa |
| G | 14 | Dale Foell | 5 ft 7 in (1.7 m) | — |
| G | 40 | Charles Herbert | 6 ft 4 in (1.93 m) | — | | Macomb, Illinois |
| F | | Jim Hogue | 6 ft 2 in (1.88 m) | — |
| F | 5 | Lloyd Kester | 6 ft 0 in (1.83 m) | — | Sr | Ames, Iowa |
| F | 8 | Bob McLuen | 6 ft 1 in (1.85 m) | — | | Ashton, Iowa |
| C | | Dean Norman | 6 ft 4 in (1.93 m) | — |
| F | 50 | Don Paulsen | 6 ft 4 in (1.93 m) | — | | Huxley, Iowa |
| G | 3 | Bob Petersen (C) | 5 ft 8 in (1.73 m) | — | Sr | Harlan, Iowa |
| F | 45 | Therol Peterson | 6 ft 1 in (1.85 m) | — | Jr | Clinton, Iowa |
| F | | Harlan Platte | — | — |
| G | 7 | Dudley Ruisch | 6 ft 4 in (1.93 m) | — | | Sioux City, Iowa |
| F | 42 | Leo Schneider | 6 ft 3 in (1.91 m) | — | Sr | Rock Island, Illinois |
| G | 41 | John Sheperd | 6 ft 1 in (1.85 m) | — | Sr | Gary, Indiana |
| G | | Jim Sutherland | 5 ft 10 in (1.78 m) | — |
| F | | Frank Voight | 6 ft 3 in (1.91 m) | — |
| C | 51 | Sylvester Wilhelmi | 6 ft 5 in (1.96 m) | — | | Le Mars, Iowa |

Head coach

- Clay Sutherland

Assistant coach(es)

L.C. (Cap) Timm

Legend

- (C) Team captain
- (S) Suspended
- (I) Ineligible
- (W) Walk-on
- Injured
- Current redshirt

== Schedule and results ==
| Date time, TV | Rank^{#} | Opponent^{#} | Result | Record | Site city, state |
Regular season
| December 1, 1948*; 7:30 pm | | Cornell | W 61–36 | 1–0 | Iowa State Armory; Ames, Iowa |
| December 4, 1948*; 7:30 pm | | Coe | W 75–35 | 2–0 | Iowa State Armory; Ames, Iowa |
| December 6, 1948*; 8:15 pm | | at Drake; Iowa Big Four | L 38–53 | 2–1 | Drake Fieldhouse; Des Moines, Iowa |
| December 11, 1948*; 7:30 pm | | Drake; Iowa Big Four | W 51–43 | 3–1 | Iowa State Armory; Ames, Iowa |
| December 18, 1948* | | at Canisius | L 45–58 | 3–2 | Buffalo Memorial Auditorium; Buffalo, New York |
| December 21, 1948*; 7:00 pm, WCBS (delay) | | at St. John's | L 47–71 | 3–3 | Madison Square Garden; New York City |
| December 22, 1948* | | at Syracuse | L 46–67 | 3–4 | State Fair Coliseum; Syracuse, New York |
| December 27, 1948*; 8:00 pm | | vs. Harvard; Big Seven Holiday Tournament Quarterfinals | W 56–54 | 4–4 | Municipal Auditorium; Kansas City, Missouri |
| December 29, 1948*; 9:30 pm | | vs. Oklahoma; Big Seven Holiday Tournament Semifinals | L 45–55 | 4–5 | Municipal Auditorium; Kansas City, Missouri |
| December 30, 1948*; 8:30 pm | | vs. Kansas State; Big Seven Holiday Tournament Third Place | W 56–52 | 5–5 | Municipal Auditorium; Kansas City, Missouri |
| January 8, 1949; 7:30 pm | | Oklahoma | L 42–43 | 5–6 (0–1) | Iowa State Armory; Ames, Iowa |
| January 15, 1949; 7:30 pm | | at Nebraska | L 50–71 | 5–7 (0–2) | Nebraska Coliseum; Lincoln, Nebraska |
| January 17, 1949 | | at Kansas State | L 43–49 | 5–8 (0–3) | Nichols Hall; Manhattan, Kansas |
| January 22, 1949; 8:00 pm | | at Missouri | L 36–39 | 5–9 (0–4) | Brewer Fieldhouse; Columbia, Missouri |
| January 24, 1949; 7:30 pm | | Colorado | W 40–31 | 6–9 (1–4) | Iowa State Armory; Ames, Iowa |
| January 29, 1949; 8:15 pm | | at Oklahoma | L 52–55 ^{OT} | 6–10 (1–5) | OU Field House; Norman, Oklahoma |
| February 5, 1949; 7:30 pm | | Kansas | L 57–62 | 6–11 (1–6) | Iowa State Armory; Ames, Iowa |
| February 11, 1949 | | at Colorado | L 48–63 | 6–12 (1–7) | Balch Fieldhouse; Boulder, Colorado |
| February 19, 1949; 7:30 pm | | Nebraska | L 41–44 | 6–13 (1–8) | Iowa State Armory; Ames, Iowa |
| February 28, 1949; 7:30 pm | | Missouri | W 40–34 | 7–13 (2–8) | Iowa State Armory; Ames, Iowa |
| March 5, 1949; 7:30 pm | | Kansas State | L 39–54 | 7–14 (2–9) | Iowa State Armory; Ames, Iowa |
| March 8, 1949 | | at Kansas | W 49–45 | 8–14 (3–9) | Hoch Auditorium; Lawrence, Kansas |
*Non-conference game. ^{#}Rankings from AP poll. (#) Tournament seedings in parentheses. All times are in Central Time.
