= 1949 SEC men's basketball tournament =

- Classification: Division I
- Season: 1948–49
- Teams: 12
- Site: Jefferson County Armory; Louisville, Kentucky
- Champions: Kentucky (11th title)
- Winning coach: Adolph Rupp (11th title)

1948–49 Southeastern Conference men's basketball standings
	Conf.				Overall
Team	W		L	PCT	W		L	PCT
No. 1 Kentucky	13	–	0	1.000	32	–	2	.941
No. 9 Tulane	12	–	3	.800	24	–	4	.857
Tennessee	8	–	3	.727	19	–	7	.731
Vanderbilt	9	–	5	.643	14	–	8	.636
LSU	7	–	6	.538	15	–	10	.600
Alabama	9	–	9	.500	13	–	12	.520
Georgia Tech	7	–	9	.438	11	–	13	.458
Georgia	6	–	9	.400	17	–	13	.567
Florida	4	–	8	.333	11	–	16	.407
Auburn	5	–	11	.313	9	–	15	.375
Ole Miss	4	–	12	.250	8	–	13	.381
Mississippi State	3	–	12	.200	4	–	13	.235
† 1949 SEC Tournament winner Rankings from AP Poll

The 1949 SEC men's basketball tournament took place March 3–5, 1949, in Louisville, Kentucky at the Jefferson County Armory. It was the sixteenth SEC basketball tournament.

The Kentucky Wildcats won the tournament championship game by beating Tulane, 68–52. The Wildcats would go on to win the 1949 NCAA tournament and play in the 1949 National Invitation Tournament, losing in the quarterfinals to Loyola.

== Bracket ==
First Round; March 3
LSU	55
Georgia Tech	53
#7 Tulane	64
Alabama	42
Tennessee	73
Mississippi State	46
#1 Kentucky	73
Florida	36

Second Round; March 4
Vanderbilt	56
LSU	60
Georgia	62
#7 Tulane	92
Ole Miss	49
Tennessee	74
Auburn	39
#1 Kentucky	70

Semifinals; March 5
LSU	63
#7 Tulane	72
Tennessee	44
#1 Kentucky	83

Championship; March 5
#7 Tulane	52
#1 Kentucky	68
