= Slats Gill =

American college basketball coach (1901–1966)

- Gill in 1933 OSC yearbook

Biographical details
- Born: May 1, 1901; Salem, Oregon, U.S.
- Died: April 5, 1966 (aged 64); Corvallis, Oregon, U.S.

Playing career

Basketball
- 1921–1924: Oregon Agricultural
- Position: Forward

Coaching career (HC unless noted)

Basketball
- 1926–1928: Oregon Agricultural / State (freshmen)
- 1928–1964: Oregon State

Baseball
- 1932–1937: Oregon State

Administrative career (AD unless noted)
- 1964–1966: Oregon State

Head coaching record
- Overall: 599–393 (basketball); 56–70 (baseball)

Accomplishments and honors

Championships
- Basketball; 2 NCAA Regional—Final Four (1949, 1963); 5 PCC (1933, 1947, 1949, 1955, 1958)

Awards
- 2× First-team All-PCC (1922, 1924)
- Basketball Hall of Fame; Inducted in 1968
- College Basketball Hall of Fame; Inducted in 2006

Amory Tingle "Slats" Gill (May 1, 1901 – April 5, 1966) was an American college basketball coach, the head coach at Oregon State University in Corvallis for 36 seasons. As a player, Gill was twice named to the All-Pacific Coast Conference basketball team. As head coach, he amassed 599 victories with a winning percentage of .604. Gill was also the head coach of the baseball team for six seasons and later was the OSU athletic director.

Gill is a member of the Naismith Memorial Basketball Hall of Fame, the National Collegiate Basketball Hall of Fame, and the Oregon Sports Hall of Fame. He is also honored as the namesake of Gill Coliseum, opened in 1949, venue for basketball, wrestling, volleyball, and gymnastics at OSU.

== Early years ==
Born in Salem, Oregon, Gill was the youngest of eight children and his father died when he was a child. His nickname "Slats" was given to him at age 12; he was swimming in a local pond one summer afternoon and upon exiting the pond, a buddy joked with Gill about his scrawny frame with his ribs protruding, which he said looked like slats in a picket fence. Gill was from then on known as "Slats."

Gill was an athlete from his youth, excelling in basketball and baseball at Salem High School and graduated in 1920. Gill was named to all-state teams as a junior and senior.

Gill attended Oregon Agricultural College (now Oregon State University) in Corvallis. While at OAC, he played baseball and earned varsity letters in basketball from 1922 to 1924. A forward for the "Aggies" on their starting five, Gill was named to the All Conference team for the Pacific Coast Conference in 1922.

In March 1923, Gill was unanimously elected captain of the OAC basketball team by his peers for his 1923–24 senior season. He was named to the All-Pacific Coast Conference team for a second time following that 1923–24 season.

Gill met his wife, the former Helen Boyer of Portland, on a blind date at OAC in the early 1920s. The couple married in 1932. They raised two children, daughter Jane Gill (born 1933), and son John Amory Gill (1937–2014).

== Basketball coaching career ==
With his all-star basketball credentials firmly established, Gill was determined to go into the coaching profession following graduation. Gill's first head coaching job was at a high school in Oakland, California. After one season coaching there, the popular former collegiate star Gill was able to win an appointment at his alma mater as an instructor of physical education and director of restricted gymnastics for the 1926–27 academic year. Gill was also tapped to serve as head coach of the OAC freshman men's basketball team and to help coordinate the school's program of intramural athletics and general gymnastics.

The 1926–27 freshman team proved to be a bit of a disaster, losing every game on its schedule, so in December 1927 Gill organized a mass try out for the 1927–28 squad. An incredible 106 aspirants responded to Gill's call to try out for the team, with the horde winnowed down to a squad of 25 through successive cuts.

In the summer of 1928, OAC's varsity head coach Bob Hager was fired by university president William Jasper Kerr. Kerr did not need to look far for his replacement, promoting the 27-year old Gill from freshman to varsity head coach.

Under Gill, the Beavers basketball team would come to be known for a fundamentally sound and defensively oriented style of play. On the other side of the ball, Gill was known for making use of a slow, methodical "percentage offense" built around the meticulous creation of short shots and free throw opportunities from a half-court set. His teams were frequently involved in low-scoring defensive struggles.

In the years before video tape and legions of professional advanced scouts, Gill was regarded as a formidable game scout and adaptive defensive coach, the subject of a legend in the early 1940s that if "Gill has seen your basketball team in action, then his team will beat yours if the two are ever matched."

During Gill's 36-year tenure as head coach, Oregon State won five Pacific Coast Conference titles, four Northern Division championships, and a pair of Final Four appearances (1949 and 1963). His teams won eight consecutive Far West Classic titles, and Gill had 599 coaching victories with the Beavers, with a winning percentage of .604.

Following a game in Seattle in early 1960, Gill suffered a heart attack in his hotel room while with his wife. He was taken to Providence Hospital and stayed for more than three weeks. For the duration of his convalescence, head coaching duties were assumed by assistant coach Paul Valenti.

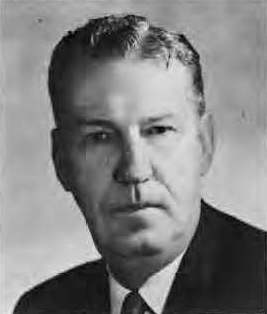
Gill circa 1963

As past president of the National Association of Basketball Coaches, Slats coached in the 1964 NABC All-Star Game.

== Athletic director ==
When Gill retired from coaching in 1964, he became the OSU athletic director, a position he held for two years, until his death. He promoted assistant Valenti to replace him as head coach, and after the 1964 football season concluded with a Rose Bowl appearance on New Year's Day, head coach Tommy Prothro left for UCLA.

Gill hired Dee Andros of Idaho, who led the Beavers to two of their best seasons (1967 & 1968) on the gridiron in his eleven years as head coach and became AD himself in 1976. Andros brought assistant coach Bud Riley with him from Moscow, and his son Mike Riley (b.1953) was the Beaver head coach for fourteen seasons (1997–1998, 2003–2014).

== Baseball coaching career ==
Gill also coached the Beavers' baseball team from 1932 to 1937, over which he compiled a career coaching record of 56 wins and 70 losses (.444).

== Death and legacy ==
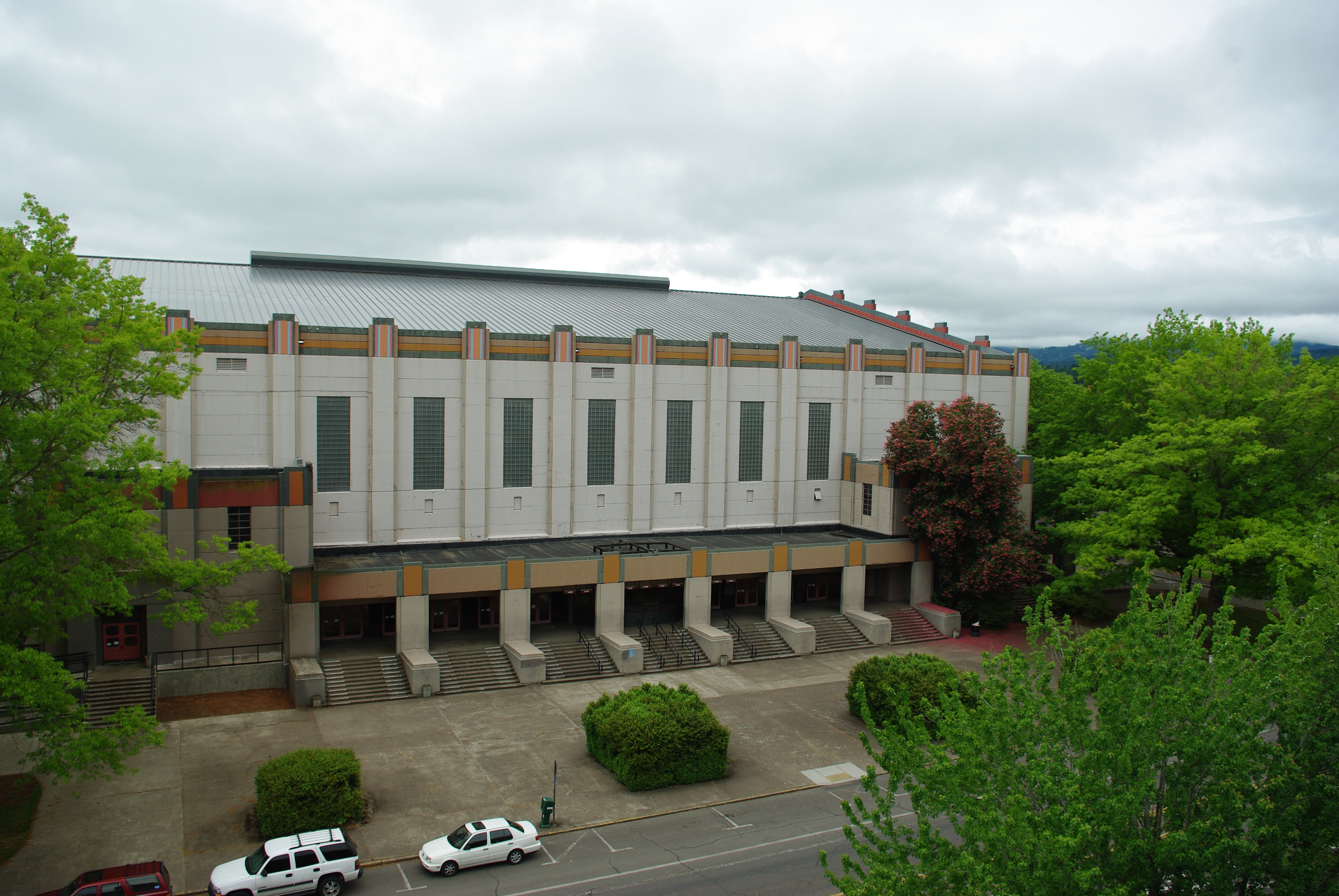
Gill Coliseum at Oregon State University, a 10,000 seat venue, opened in December 1949

In 1966, Gill was hospitalized in Corvallis on March 26 following what was described as a minor stroke. He remained in the hospital for ten days and seemingly made progress towards recovery until taking a sudden turn for the worse on the morning of April 5. Gill died at 3:25 pm that day at age 64. His funeral was held at Gill Coliseum and he was buried at St. Mary's Cemetery in Corvallis.

Gill was elected a member of the Naismith Memorial Basketball Hall of Fame and the Oregon Sports Hall of Fame. Oregon State's basketball arena, Gill Coliseum, is named for him.

Gill was the first OSU coach to include an African American player on the team. Norman Monroe was a walk-on and was the first black basketball player to play at OSU and played for the team for half of the 1960–1961 season. The first recruited, scholarship black athlete to be named to the OSU basketball team arrived only in 1966, when Charlie White was named to the squad.

== Head coaching record ==
=== Basketball ===
Record table
Season	Team	Overall	Conference	Standing	Postseason
Oregon State Beavers (Pacific Coast Conference) (1928–1959)
1928–29	Oregon State	12–8	4–6	4th (North)	
1929–30	Oregon State	14–13	7–9	4th (North)	
1930–31	Oregon State	19–9	9–7	3rd (North)	
1931–32	Oregon State	12–12	8–8	3rd (North)	
1932–33	Oregon State	21–6	12–4	1st (North)	Pacific Coast Conference champions
1933–34	Oregon State	14–10	7–9	3rd (North)	
1934–35	Oregon State	19–9	12–4	1st (North)	
1935–36	Oregon State	16–9	10–6	2nd (North)	
1936–37	Oregon State	11–15	5–11	4th (North)	
1937–38	Oregon State	17–16	6–14	5th (North)	
1938–39	Oregon State	13–11	6–10	4th (North)	
1939–40	Oregon State	27–11	12–4	1st (North)	
1940–41	Oregon State	19–9	9–7	2nd (North)	
1941–42	Oregon State	18–9	15–3	1st (North)	
1942–43	Oregon State	19–9	12–6	2nd (North)	
1943–44	Oregon State	8–16	5–11	T–3rd (North)	
1944–45	Oregon State	20–8	10–6	3rd (North)	
1945–46	Oregon State	13–11	10–6	2nd (North)	
1946–47	Oregon State	28–5	13–3	1st (North)	NCAA Regional Fourth Place
1947–48	Oregon State	21–13	10–6	T–1st (North)	
1948–49	Oregon State	24–12	12–4	1st (North)	NCAA Final Four
1949–50	Oregon State	13–14	8–8	T–2nd (North)	
1950–51	Oregon State	14–18	6–10	T–4th (North)	
1951–52	Oregon State	9–19	3–13	5th (North)	
1952–53	Oregon State	11–18	6–10	4th (North)	
1953–54	Oregon State	19–10	11–15	1st (North)	
1954–55	Oregon State	22–8	15–11	1st (North)	NCAA regional finals
1955–56	Oregon State	8–18	5–11	T–6th	
1956–57	Oregon State	11–15	6–10	6th	
1957–58	Oregon State	20–6	12–4	T–1st	
1958–59	Oregon State	13–13	17–9	6th	
Oregon State Beavers (NCAA University Division independent) (1959–1964)
1959–60	Oregon State	9–3			
1960–61	Oregon State	14–12			
1961–62	Oregon State	24–5			NCAA regional finals
1962–63	Oregon State	22–9			NCAA Final Four
1963–64	Oregon State	25–4			NCAA Regional Quarterfinals
Oregon State:		599–393	283–245		
Total:		599–393			
National champion Postseason invitational champion Conference regular season champion Conference regular season and conference tournament champion Division regular season champion Division regular season and conference tournament champion Conference tournament champion

== See also ==
- List of NCAA Division I Men's Final Four appearances by coach
