= 1948–49 Washington Huskies men's basketball team =

American college basketball season

1948–49 Washington Huskies men's basketball
- Conference: Pacific Coast Conference
- Record: 11–15 (6–10 PCC)
- Head coach: Art McLarney (2nd season)
- Home arena: Hec Edmundson Pavilion

1948–49 Pacific Coast Conference men's basketball standings
| | Conf. | | | | Overall |
| Team | W | | L | PCT | W | | L | PCT |
|---|---|---|---|---|---|---|---|---|
North
| Oregon State † | 12 | – | 4 | .750 | 24 | – | 12 | .667 |
| Washington State | 8 | – | 8 | .500 | 21 | – | 9 | .700 |
| Oregon | 7 | – | 9 | .438 | 12 | – | 18 | .400 |
| Idaho | 7 | – | 9 | .438 | 17 | – | 15 | .531 |
| Washington | 6 | – | 10 | .375 | 11 | – | 15 | .423 |
South
| No. 15 UCLA | 10 | – | 2 | .833 | 22 | – | 7 | .759 |
| USC | 8 | – | 4 | .667 | 14 | – | 10 | .583 |
| Stanford | 5 | – | 7 | .417 | 19 | – | 9 | .679 |
| California | 1 | – | 11 | .083 | 14 | – | 19 | .424 |
† Conference playoff series winner Rankings from AP Poll

The 1948–49 Washington Huskies men's basketball team represented the University of Washington for the 1948–49 NCAA college basketball season. Led by second-year head coach Art McLarney, the Huskies were members of the Pacific Coast Conference and played their home games on campus at Hec Edmundson Pavilion in Seattle, Washington.

The defending conference champion Huskies were 11–15 overall in the regular season and 6–10 in conference play, last place in the Northern division. They ended the season with a two-game sweep over the rival Washington State Cougars.
