= Everett Shelton =

American basketball coach (1898–1974)

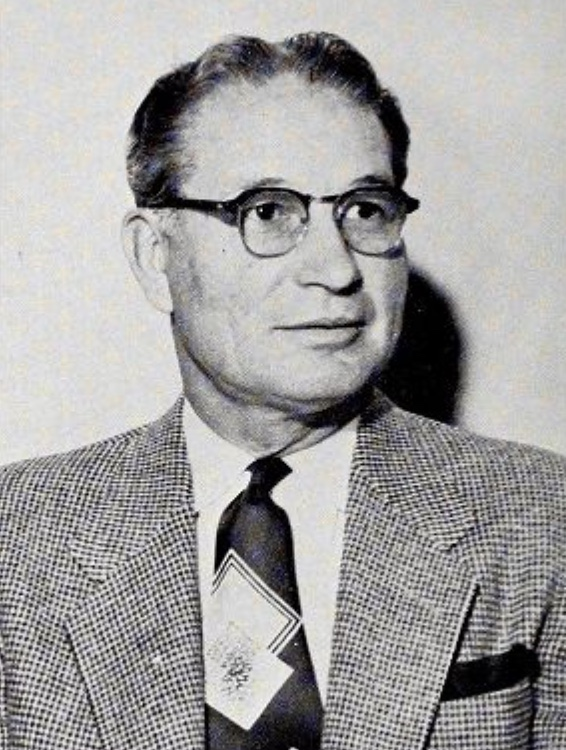
- Shelton in 1955

Biographical details
- Born: May 12, 1898; Cunningham, Kansas, U.S.
- Died: April 16, 1974 (aged 75); Sacramento, California, U.S.

Playing career

Basketball
- c. 1920: Phillips

Football
- c. 1920: Phillips

Coaching career (HC unless noted)

Basketball
- 1923–1926: Phillips
- 1939–1959: Wyoming
- 1959–1968: Sacramento State

Football
- 1924–1926: Phillips

Baseball
- 1942–1943: Wyoming
- 1947: Wyoming
- 1949: Wyoming

Administrative career (AD unless noted)
- c. 1924: Phillips

Head coaching record
- Overall: 494–350 (basketball); 5–20–1 (football); 18–22 (baseball)
- Tournaments: Basketball; 4–12 (NCAA)

Accomplishments and honors

Championships
- Basketball; NCAA (1943); 8 MSC/Skyline (1941, 1943, 1946, 1947, 1949, 1952, 1953, 1958)
- Basketball Hall of Fame; Inducted in 1980 (profile)
- College Basketball Hall of Fame; Inducted in 2006

Everett F. Shelton (May 12, 1898 – April 16, 1974) was an American basketball coach in the 1940s and 1950s. Shelton played quarterback for the Phillips University football team. The Cunningham, Kansas native coached 46 years at the high school, college and Amateur Athletic Union (AAU) levels and compiled an 850–437 record. He is mostly known for coaching the Wyoming Cowboys men's basketball team from 1939 to 1959. While at Wyoming, Shelton had a record of 328 wins and 201 losses for a .620 winning percentage. He guided the Cowboys to eight Mountain States / Skyline Conference championships and seven NCAA Tournament appearances. During his career, he was President of the National Association of Basketball Coaches. He was elected to the Naismith Memorial Basketball Hall of Fame in 1980.

Shelton's 1942–43 Wyoming Cowboys basketball team won the fifth NCAA basketball tournament. Shelton nearly won the national championship at Sacramento State College, where his Hornets lost in overtime to Mount St. Mary's in the 1962 NCAA College Division basketball tournament.

== Head coaching record ==
=== Basketball ===
Record table
Season	Team	Overall	Conference	Standing	Postseason
Wyoming Cowboys (Mountain States Conference / Skyline Conference) (1939–1959)
1939–40	Wyoming	6–10	3–9	T–5th	
1940–41	Wyoming	14–6	10–2	1st	NCAA Elite Eight
1941–42	Wyoming	15–5	9–3	T–2nd	
1942–43	Wyoming	31–2	4–0	1st	NCAA Champion
1944–45	Wyoming	10–18	7–5	3rd	
1945–46	Wyoming	22–4	10–2	1st	
1946–47	Wyoming	22–6	11–1	1st	NCAA Elite Eight
1947–48	Wyoming	18–9	6–4	T–2nd	
1948–49	Wyoming	25–10	15–5	1st	NCAA Elite Eight
1949–50	Wyoming	25–11	13–7	T–2nd	
1950–51	Wyoming	26–11	13–7	2nd	
1951–52	Wyoming	28–7	13–1	1st	NCAA Elite Eight
1952–53	Wyoming	20–10	12–2	1st	NCAA Sweet Sixteen
1953–54	Wyoming	19–9	10–4	2nd	
1954–55	Wyoming	17–9	9–5	T–3rd	
1955–56	Wyoming	7–19	5–9	T–7th	
1956–57	Wyoming	6–19	4–10	7th	
1957–58	Wyoming	13–14	10–4	1st	NCAA first round
1958–59	Wyoming	4–22	1–13	T–7th	
Wyoming:		328–201 (.620)	165–93 (.640)		
Sacramento State Hornets (Far Western Conference) (1959–1968)
1959–60	Sacramento State	10–13	6–4		
1960–61	Sacramento State	17–8	8–2		
1961–62	Sacramento State	21–10	10–2		NCAA College Division Runner-up
1962–63	Sacramento State	10–16	4–8		
1963–64	Sacramento State	8–18	5–7		
1964–65	Sacramento State	10–16	4–8		
1965–66	Sacramento State	10–16	6–6		
1966–67	Sacramento State	15–11	10–4		
1967–68	Sacramento State	16–10	9–5		
Sacramento State:		117–118 (.498)	62–46 (.574)		
Total:		445–319 (.582)			
National champion Postseason invitational champion Conference regular season champion Conference regular season and conference tournament champion Division regular season champion Division regular season and conference tournament champion Conference tournament champion

=== Football ===
Year	Team	Overall	Conference	Standing
Phillips Haymakers (Oklahoma Intercollegiate Conference) (1924–1926)
1924	Phillips	2–7	2–3	6th
1925	Phillips	1–8	1–6	9th
1926	Phillips	2–5–1	2–3–1	8th
Phillips:		5–20–1	5–12–1	
Total:		5–20–1		

== See also ==
- List of NCAA Division I Men's Final Four appearances by coach
