= 1948–49 Oregon State Beavers men's basketball team =

American college basketball season

1948–49 Oregon State Beavers men's basketball

Pacific Coast Conference champions

NCAA tournament, Final Four
- Conference: Pacific Coast Conference
- Record: 24–12 (12–4 PCC)
- Head coach: Slats Gill (21st season)
- Home arena: Men's Gymnasium

1948–49 Pacific Coast Conference men's basketball standings
| | Conf. | | | | Overall |
| Team | W | | L | PCT | W | | L | PCT |
|---|---|---|---|---|---|---|---|---|
North
| Oregon State † | 12 | – | 4 | .750 | 24 | – | 12 | .667 |
| Washington State | 8 | – | 8 | .500 | 21 | – | 9 | .700 |
| Oregon | 7 | – | 9 | .438 | 12 | – | 18 | .400 |
| Idaho | 7 | – | 9 | .438 | 17 | – | 15 | .531 |
| Washington | 6 | – | 10 | .375 | 11 | – | 15 | .423 |
South
| No. 15 UCLA | 10 | – | 2 | .833 | 22 | – | 7 | .759 |
| USC | 8 | – | 4 | .667 | 14 | – | 10 | .583 |
| Stanford | 5 | – | 7 | .417 | 19 | – | 9 | .679 |
| California | 1 | – | 11 | .083 | 14 | – | 19 | .424 |
† Conference playoff series winner Rankings from AP Poll

The 1948–49 Oregon State Beavers men's basketball team represented Oregon State University in Corvallis, Oregon, during the 1948–49 season.

Led by head coach Slats Gill, serving in his 21st of 36 seasons, the Beavers participated in the 1949 NCAA Tournament and reached the first Final Four in school history.

== Roster ==
1948–49 Oregon State Beavers men's basketball team
| Players | Coaches |
|---|---|
| Pos. / # / Name / Height / Weight / Year / Previous school / Hometown; F / 18 / Cliff Crandall / 6 ft 2 in (1.88 m) / — / Sr | Head coach: Slats Gill (Oregon State); Assistant coach(es) Legend: (C) Team captain; (S) Suspended; (I) Ineligible; (W) Walk-on; Injured; Current redshirt |

== Schedule and results ==
| Date time, TV | Rank^{#} | Opponent^{#} | Result | Record | Site (attendance) city, state |
Regular season
| Dec 1, 1948* | | at Portland | W 43–33 | 1–0 | Howard Hall; Portland, Oregon |
| Dec 3, 1948* | | vs. Utah State | W 52–38 | 2–0 | Nielsen Fieldhouse; Salt Lake City, Utah |
| Dec 4, 1948* | | at Utah | L 42–53 | 2–1 | Nielsen Fieldhouse; Salt Lake City, Utah |
| Dec 10, 1948* | | Willamette | W 63–40 | 3–1 | Men's Gymnasium; Corvallis, Oregon |
| Dec 11, 1948* | | Portland | W 70–53 | 4–1 | Men's Gymnasium; Corvallis, Oregon |
| Dec 14, 1948* | | at Willamette | W 43–41 | 5–1 | Salem, Oregon |
| Dec 17, 1948* | | Oakland Bittners | L 41–45 | 5–2 | Men's Gymnasium; Corvallis, Oregon |
| Dec 18, 1948* | | Oakland Bittners | L 40–52 | 5–3 | Men's Gymnasium; Corvallis, Oregon |
| Dec 20, 1948* | | Wyoming | W 55–50 | 6–3 | Men's Gymnasium; Corvallis, Oregon |
| Dec 21, 1948* | | Wyoming | L 52–53 ^{OT} | 6–4 | Men's Gymnasium; Corvallis, Oregon |
| Dec 27, 1948* | | vs. USC; Pacific Coast Conference basketball tournament | L 40–60 | 6–5 | Cow Palace; Daly City, California |
| Dec 28, 1948* | | vs. Washington; Pacific Coast Conference basketball tournament | W 64–62 | 7–5 | Cow Palace; Daly City, California |
| Dec 30, 1948* | | vs. UCLA; Pacific Coast Conference basketball tournament | W 62–58 | 8–5 | Cow Palace; Daly City, California |
| Jan 3, 1949* | | vs. Portland | W 61–45 | 9–5 | McMinnville, Oregon |
| Jan 7, 1949 | | at Washington | W 52–50 | 10–5 (1–0) | Hec Edmundson Pavilion; Seattle, Washington |
| Jan 8, 1949 | | at Washington | L 43–54 | 10–6 (1–1) | Hec Edmundson Pavilion; Seattle, Washington |
| Jan 17, 1949 | | Idaho | W 42–31 | 11–6 (2–1) | Men's Gymnasium; Corvallis, Oregon |
| Jan 18, 1949 | | Idaho | W 69–53 | 12–6 (3–1) | Men's Gymnasium; Corvallis, Oregon |
| Jan 28, 1949 | | Washington | W 54–44 | 13–6 (4–1) | Men's Gymnasium; Corvallis, Oregon |
| Jan 29, 1949 | | Washington | W 49–45 | 14–6 (5–1) | Men's Gymnasium; Corvallis, Oregon |
| Feb 4, 1949 | | at Idaho | L 39–51 | 14–7 (5–2) | Memorial Gymnasium; Moscow, Idaho |
| Feb 5, 1949 | | at Idaho | W 47–35 | 15–7 (6–2) | Memorial Gymnasium; Moscow, Idaho |
| Feb 7, 1949 | | at No. 17 Washington State | L 41–47 | 15–8 (6–3) | Bohler Gymnasium; Pullman, Washington |
| Feb 8, 1949 | | at No. 17 Washington State | W 42–34 | 16–8 (7–3) | Bohler Gymnasium; Pullman, Washington |
| Feb 18, 1949 | | Washington State | W 52–47 | 17–8 (8–3) | Men's Gymnasium; Corvallis, Oregon |
| Feb 19, 1949 | | Washington State | W 51–42 | 18–8 (9–3) | Men's Gymnasium; Corvallis, Oregon |
| Feb 25, 1949 | | at Oregon | L 54–61 | 18–9 (9–4) | McArthur Court; Eugene, Oregon |
| Feb 26, 1949 | | Oregon | W 42–38 | 19–9 (10–4) | Men's Gymnasium; Corvallis, Oregon |
| Mar 4, 1949 | | at Oregon | W 79–72 ^{2OT} | 20–9 (11–4) | McArthur Court; Eugene, Oregon |
| Mar 5, 1949 | | Oregon | W 47–45 | 21–9 (12–4) | Men's Gymnasium; Corvallis, Oregon |
PCC Championship
| Mar 11, 1949 | | No. 15 UCLA; PCC Championship play-offs | W 53–41 | 22–9 | Men's Gymnasium; Corvallis, Oregon |
| Mar 12, 1949 | | No. 15 UCLA; PCC Championship play-offs | L 39–46 | 22–10 | Men's Gymnasium; Corvallis, Oregon |
| Mar 14, 1949 | | No. 15 UCLA; PCC Championship play-offs | W 41–35 | 23–10 | Men's Gymnasium; Corvallis, Oregon |
NCAA Tournament
| Mar 18, 1949* | | vs. Arkansas; National Quarterfinal – Elite Eight | W 56–38 | 24–10 | Municipal Auditorium; Kansas City, Missouri |
| Mar 19, 1949* | | vs. No. 2 Oklahoma A&M; National Semifinal – Final Four | L 30–55 | 24–11 | Municipal Auditorium; Kansas City, Missouri |
| Mar 26, 1949* | | vs. No. 4 Illinois; National consolation game | L 53–57 | 24–12 | Hec Edmundson Pavilion; Seattle, Washington |
*Non-conference game. ^{#}Rankings from AP Poll. (#) Tournament seedings in parentheses.
