= 1948–49 Idaho Vandals men's basketball team =

American college basketball season

1948–49 Idaho Vandals men's basketball
- Conference: Pacific Coast Conference
- Record: 17–15 (7–9 PCC)
- Head coach: Charles Finley (2nd season)
- MVP: Preston Brimhall
- Home arena: Memorial Gymnasium

1948–49 Pacific Coast Conference men's basketball standings
	Conf.				Overall
Team	W		L	PCT	W		L	PCT
North
Oregon State †	12	–	4	.750	24	–	12	.667
Washington State	8	–	8	.500	21	–	9	.700
Oregon	7	–	9	.438	12	–	18	.400
Idaho	7	–	9	.438	17	–	15	.531
Washington	6	–	10	.375	11	–	15	.423
South
No. 15 UCLA	10	–	2	.833	22	–	7	.759
USC	8	–	4	.667	14	–	10	.583
Stanford	5	–	7	.417	19	–	9	.679
California	1	–	11	.083	14	–	19	.424
† Conference playoff series winner Rankings from AP Poll

The 1948–49 Idaho Vandals men's basketball team represented the University of Idaho during the 1948–49 NCAA college basketball season. Members of the Pacific Coast Conference, the Vandals were led by second-year head coach Charles Finley and played their home games on campus at Memorial Gymnasium in Moscow, Idaho.

The Vandals were 17–15 overall and 7–9 in conference play.
