= 1948–49 Georgia Bulldogs basketball team =

American college basketball season

1948–49 Georgia Bulldogs basketball
- Conference: Southeastern Conference
- Record: 17–13 (6–9 SEC)
- Head coach: Ralph Jordan (3rd season)
- Captain: Bob Healey
- Home arena: Woodruff Hall

1948–49 Southeastern Conference men's basketball standings
	Conf.				Overall
Team	W		L	PCT	W		L	PCT
No. 1 Kentucky	13	–	0	1.000	32	–	2	.941
No. 9 Tulane	12	–	3	.800	24	–	4	.857
Tennessee	8	–	3	.727	19	–	7	.731
Vanderbilt	9	–	5	.643	14	–	8	.636
LSU	7	–	6	.538	15	–	10	.600
Alabama	9	–	9	.500	13	–	12	.520
Georgia Tech	7	–	9	.438	11	–	13	.458
Georgia	6	–	9	.400	17	–	13	.567
Florida	4	–	8	.333	11	–	16	.407
Auburn	5	–	11	.313	9	–	15	.375
Ole Miss	4	–	12	.250	8	–	13	.381
Mississippi State	3	–	12	.200	4	–	13	.235
† 1949 SEC Tournament winner Rankings from AP Poll

The 1948–49 Georgia Bulldogs basketball team represented the University of Georgia as a member of the Southeastern Conference (SEC) during the 1948–49 NCAA men's basketball season. Led by third-year head coach Ralph Jordan, the Bulldogs compiled an overall record of 17–13 with a mark of 6–9 conference play, placing eighth in the SEC. The team captain was Bob Healey.

== Roster ==
1948–49 Georgia Bulldogs men's basketball team
Players
Coaches

Pos.	#	Name	Height	Weight	Year	Previous school	Hometown
F		Bob Healey	6 ft 2 in (1.88 m)	—	Jr
F		Earl Davis	6 ft 2 in (1.88 m)	—	So
C		Bob Schloss	6 ft 8 in (2.03 m)	—	So
G		Joe Jordan	5 ft 9 in (1.75 m)	—	So
G		E.L. Rainey	6 ft 0 in (1.83 m)	—	Jr
G		J.B. Farr	—	—
C		Al Fabian	—	—
F		Dick Thomas	6 ft 0 in (1.83 m)	—	So
G		Ryle Tatum	6 ft 0 in (1.83 m)	—
F		John Davis	—	—
C		Jesse Fox	—	—
G		Minton Williams	6 ft 0 in (1.83 m)	—
F		Gene Lorendo	—	—

Head coach

Ralph Jordan

Assistant coach(es)

Legend

- (C) Team captain
- (S) Suspended
- (I) Ineligible
- (W) Walk-on
- Injured
- Current redshirt

== Schedule ==
Date time, TV	Opponent	Result	Record	Site city, state
12/3/1948	Clemson	W 70-48	1–0	Athens, GA
12/4/1948	Furman	W 74-45	2–0	Athens, GA
12/8/1948	at Clemson	W 60-58	3–0	
12/10/1948	Chattanooga	W 81-53	4–0	Athens, GA
12/11/1948	Mercer	W 78-59	5–0	Athens, GA
12/13/1948	Mississippi State	W 70-40	6–0	Athens, GA
12/18/1948	at Buffalo	W 56-51	7–0	
12/20/1948	at N.Y.U.	L 72-83	7–1	
1/3/1949	at Furman	L 56-71	7–2	
1/7/1949	at Ole Miss	W 63-54	8–2	
1/8/1949	at Alabama	L 40-46	8–3	
1/14/1949	Auburn	W 55-52	9–3	Athens, GA
1/16/1949	Alabama	L 43-49	9–4	Athens, GA
1/18/1949	at South Carolina	W 49-43	10–4	
1/21/1949	at Florida	W 59-48	11–4	
1/24/1949	Tennessee	L 59-61	11–5	Athens, GA
1/26/1949	at Georgia Tech	W 74-60	12–5	
1/28/1949	at Mercer	W 63-51	13–5	
2/2/1949	Georgia Tech	L 49-56	13–6	Athens, GA
2/4/1949	at Tennessee	L 51-77	13–7	
2/5/1949	at Chattanooga	W 66-65	14–7	
2/9/1949	at Erskine	W 53-38	15–7	
2/11/1949	Florida	W 63-39	16–7	Athens, GA
2/12/1949	Florida	L 49-55	16–8	Athens, GA
2/16/1949	at Georgia Tech	L 58-60	16–9	
2/20/1949	at Auburn	L 47-53	16–10	
2/21/1949	at Kentucky	L 40-95	16–11	
2/23/1949	Erskine	W 74-33	17–11	Athens, GA
2/26/1949	South Carolina	L 63-64	17–12	Athens, GA
3/4/1949	Tulane	L 62-92	17–13	Athens, GA
*Non-conference game. (#) Tournament seedings in parentheses.
