= Art McLarney =

American baseball player (1908-1984)

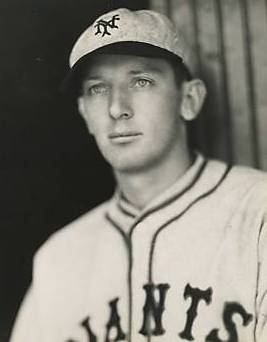
- Infielder
- Born: December 20, 1908; Port Townsend, Washington, U.S.
- Died: December 20, 1984 (aged 76); Seattle, Washington, U.S.
- Batted: Both Threw: Right

MLB debut
- August 23, 1932, for the New York Giants

Last MLB appearance
- September 25, 1932, for the New York Giants

MLB statistics
- Batting average: .130
- Hits: 3
- Runs batted in: 3
- Stats at Baseball Reference

Teams
- New York Giants (1932)

Arthur James McLarney (December 20, 1908 – December 20, 1984) was an American professional baseball player whose career spanned three seasons, one of which was spent in Major League Baseball (MLB) with the New York Giants (1932). Over his major league career, he compiled a .130 batting average with two runs scored, three hits, one double, and three run batted in (RBIs) in nine games played. Defensively, he played seven games at shortstop. McLarney also played two season in the minor leagues with the Class-A Williamsport Grays (1933), and the Double-A Seattle Indians (1933–34). In his two-year minor league career, he batted .255 with 126 hits, 18 doubles, two triples, and two home runs. McLarney played shortstop, second base, and first base over his career in the minors. After his playing career was over, McLarney coached college baseball, basketball, and football. During his playing career, he stood at 6 feet (180 cm) and weighed 168 pounds (76 kg). He was a switch-hitter who threw right-handed.

== Early life and college career ==
Art McLarney was born on December 20, 1908, in Port Townsend, Washington, to Edward and Margret McLarney, both of New York City, and Irish American. Edward McLarney was a soldier in the United States Army, and a clerk later in life. Art McLarney had four siblings; brothers Douglas, Ralph, and Felix; and sister Ethel. By 1930, Art was living with his sister, Ethel. In 1930, McLarney enrolled at Washington State University in Pullman, Washington. While in college, he played basketball and baseball. As a member of the baseball team, he was a two-time letter winner (1930, 1932). During the 1931 baseball season, he batted .320 with 15 runs scored, and 32 hits in 100 at-bats. Playing basketball, McLarney was named first-team All-Pacific Coast Conference in 1930, and selected to the Pacific Coast Conference all-star second team for the 1931–32 season.

== Professional playing career ==
In 1932, the New York Giants signed McLarney out of college. The position on the Giant's roster that McLarney was given became available after Travis Jackson suffered a season-ending injury. The Associated Press wrote that McLarney was a "sensational shortstop [...] brilliant fielder and a consistent hitter". He made his major league debut on August 23 that season against the Pittsburgh Pirates where he was used as a defensive replacement. His first major league hit, which was a double, came on September 20, against the Boston Braves. On the season, he batted .130 with two runs scored, three hits, one double, three runs batted in (RBIs), three strikeouts, and one base on balls in nine games played. Defensively, he made 13 putouts, 17 assists, and he converted three double plays in seven games.

At the start of the 1933 season, McLarney was a member of the Giants spring training roster. Before the start of the regular season, the Giants optioned McLarney to the Class-A Williamsport Grays of the New York–Pennsylvania League. With the Grays that season, he batted .237 with 32 hits, five doubles, and one triple in 33 games played. In the field, he played all of his 33 games at second base. Later that year, he signed with the Double-A Seattle Indians of the Pacific Coast League. In 86 games with the Indians, he batted .268 with 85 hits, 12 doubles, one triple, and two home runs. Defensively, he played all of his games at shortstop. In 1934, McLarney re-signed with the Seattle Indians. That year, which would be his final as a player, he batted .209 with nine hits, and one double in 18 games played. He played all of his games at first base that season.

== Coaching career ==
Art McLarney
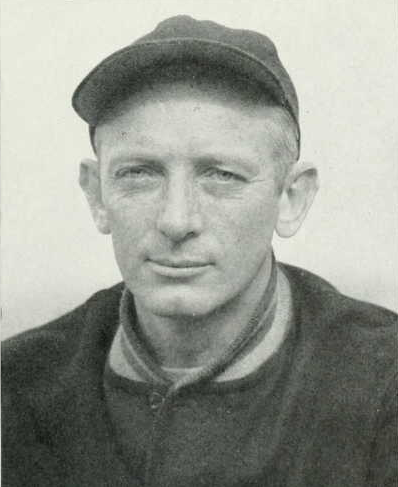
- McLarney in 1946 as the assistant coach of the Washington Huskies football team

Playing career

Basketball
- 1930–1932: Washington State

Baseball
- 1930–1932: Washington State
- 1932: New York Giants
- 1933: Williamsport Grays
- 1933–1934: Seattle Indians
- Position: Infielder (baseball)

Coaching career (HC unless noted)

Football
- 1946: Washington (assistant)

Basketball
- 1946–1947: Washington (assistant)
- 1947–1950: Washington
- 1950–1951: Bellarmine Prep (WA)
- 1954–1955: Portland

Baseball
- 1947–1949: Washington
- 1952–1954: Portland

Head coaching record
- Overall: 58–44 (college basketball); 47–54–2 (college baseball)
- Tournaments: Basketball; 1–1 (NCAA)

Accomplishments and honors

Championships
- Basketball; 1 PCC (1948)

After his playing career was over, McLarney was hired as the manager of the Bellingham, Washington semi-professional baseball team, who were members of the Northwest League. He served as the physical education teacher, head basketball coach, head track coach, and assistant football coach for Roosevelt High School in 1946. In 1946, McLarney accepted a job from the University of Washington to be the assistant coach of their football team. He also served as the assistant coach for the school's men's basketball team. Later that year, he accepted the position as head coach of their baseball team. He coached them for three seasons (1947–49). In 1947, the University of Washington hired him to lead the men's basketball team. He served as their coach for three seasons (1947–1950). McLarney resigned his position in 1950 due to stress.

McLarney was hired to coach the basketball team at Bellarmine Preparatory School in Tacoma, Washington, during the 1950–51 season. In 1951, there was a rumor that McLarney was hired by Gonzaga University to coach their men's basketball team, however nothing ever formed. He was brought in to coach the University of Portland men's baseball team in 1952. He led the team to a 24–32 record in his three seasons at the helm (1952–54). He resigned as the head basketball coach due to health issues. McLarney also coached the University of Portland men's basketball team for the 1954–55 season, compiling a 10–16 record.

During the mid-1950s, McLarney served as a coach for the Pendleton Ranchers, a collegiate summer league baseball team based in Pendleton, Oregon.

== Later life and death ==
In 1959, McLarney was appointed recreational leader of the Fort Worden Diagnostic and Treatment Center in his hometown, Port Townsend, Washington. In 1981, he was inducted into the Washington State Cougars athletic hall of fame. McLarney died on December 20, 1984, his 76th birthday, in Seattle. He was buried at Laurel Grove Cemetery in Port Townsend, Washington.

== Head coaching record ==
=== Basketball ===
Record table
Season	Team	Overall	Conference	Standing	Postseason
Washington Huskies (Pacific Coast Conference) (1947–1950)
1947–48	Washington	23–11	10–6	1st	NCAA Elite Eight
1948–49	Washington	11–15	6–10	5th	
1949–50	Washington	19–10	8–8	T–2nd	
Washington:		53–36 (.596)	24–24 (.500)		
Portland Pilots (Independent) (1954–1955)
1954–55	Portland	5–8			
Portland:		5–8 (.385)			
Total:		58–44 (.569)			
National champion Postseason invitational champion Conference regular season champion Conference regular season and conference tournament champion Division regular season champion Division regular season and conference tournament champion Conference tournament champion
