= 1948–49 UCLA Bruins men's basketball team =

American college basketball season

1948–49 UCLA Bruins men's basketball

PCC Southern Division Champion
- Conference: Pacific Coast Conference

Ranking
- AP: No. 15
- Record: 22–7 (10–2 PCC)
- Head coach: John R. Wooden (1st season)
- Assistant coaches: Bill Putnam; Eddie Powell
- Home arena: Men's Gym

1948–49 Pacific Coast Conference men's basketball standings
| | Conf. | | | | Overall |
| Team | W | | L | PCT | W | | L | PCT |
|---|---|---|---|---|---|---|---|---|
North
| Oregon State † | 12 | – | 4 | .750 | 24 | – | 12 | .667 |
| Washington State | 8 | – | 8 | .500 | 21 | – | 9 | .700 |
| Oregon | 7 | – | 9 | .438 | 12 | – | 18 | .400 |
| Idaho | 7 | – | 9 | .438 | 17 | – | 15 | .531 |
| Washington | 6 | – | 10 | .375 | 11 | – | 15 | .423 |
South
| No. 15 UCLA | 10 | – | 2 | .833 | 22 | – | 7 | .759 |
| USC | 8 | – | 4 | .667 | 14 | – | 10 | .583 |
| Stanford | 5 | – | 7 | .417 | 19 | – | 9 | .679 |
| California | 1 | – | 11 | .083 | 14 | – | 19 | .424 |
† Conference playoff series winner Rankings from AP Poll

The 1948–49 UCLA Bruins men's basketball team represented the University of California, Los Angeles during the 1948–49 NCAA men's basketball season and were members of the Pacific Coast Conference. The Bruins were led by first year head coach John Wooden. They finished the regular season with a record of 22–7 and were southern division champions with a record of 10–2. They lost to the Oregon State Beavers in the conference play-offs.

== Previous season ==
The Bruins finished the season 12–13 overall and were third in the PCC South Division with a record of 3–9. At the end of the season, head coach Wilbur Johns retired and become UCLA's athletic director. John Wooden was hired as Johns' successor in April 1948.

== Roster ==
1948–49 UCLA Bruins men's basketball team
Players
Coaches

| Pos. | # | Name | Height | Weight | Year | Hometown |
|---|---|---|---|---|---|---|
| C | 35 | Ray Alba | — | — |
| G | 72 | Art Alper | — | — |
| F | 55 | Eldon Bennett | — | — | Sr |
| C | 53 | Wayne Boulding | — | — |
| F | 56 | Guy Buccola | — | — |
| F | 57 | Chuck Clustka | — | — | Sr |
| C | 49 | Dick Irmas | — | — |
| F | 38 | Ralph Joeckel | — | — |
| F | 76 | Ernie Johnson | — | — | Jr | Berkeley, California |
| C | 32 | Carl Kraushaar | — | — | Jr |
| | 39 | Grover Luchsinger | — | — |
| G | 78 | Ron Pearson (C) | — | — | Sr |
| F | 54 | Alan Sawyer | 6 ft 5 in (1.96 m) | 195 lb (88 kg) | So | Long Beach, California |
| G | 74 | Don Seidel | — | — |
| G | 75 | Eddie Sheldrake | — | — |
| G | 73 | George Stanich | — | — | Jr | Sacramento, California |

Head coach

John Wooden (Purdue)

Assistant coach(es)

- Eddie Powell (Indiana St)
- Bill Putnam (UCLA)

Legend

- (C) Team captain
- (S) Suspended
- (I) Ineligible
- (W) Walk-on
- Injured
- Current redshirt

Roster
Last update: 30 January 2018

== Schedule ==
| Date time, TV | Rank^{#} | Opponent^{#} | Result | Record | Site city, state |
Regular Season
| December 3, 1948* | | Santa Barbara College | W 43–37 | 1–0 | Men's Gym; Los Angeles, CA |
| December 4, 1948* | | Loyola | W 51–38 | 2–0 | Men's Gym; Los Angeles, CA |
| December 10, 1948* | | vs. Saint Mary's | W 61–58 | 3–0 | Kezar Pavilion; San Francisco, CA |
| December 11, 1948* | | at San Francisco | W 61–57 | 4–0 | Kezar Pavilion; San Francisco, CA |
| December 17, 1948* | | Santa Clara | W 61–43 | 5–0 | Men's Gym; Los Angeles, CA |
| December 21, 1948* | | Northwestern | W 49–44 | 6–0 | Pan-Pacific Auditorium; Los Angeles, CA |
| December 23, 1948* | | Wisconsin | L 46–49 | 6–1 | Pan-Pacific Auditorium; Los Angeles, CA |
| December 27, 1948 | | vs. Washington State; Pacific Coast Conference basketball tournament | W 54–44 | 7–1 (1–0) | Cow Palace; Daly City, CA |
| December 28, 1948 | | vs. Stanford; Pacific Coast Conference basketball tournament | L 47–55 | 7–2 (1–1) | Cow Palace; Daly City, CA |
| December 30, 1948 | | vs. Oregon State; Pacific Coast Conference basketball tournament | L 58–62 | 7–3 (1–2) | Cow Palace; Daly City, CA |
| January 7, 1949 | | at Stanford | L 52–61 | 7–4 (1–3) | Stanford Pavilion; Stanford, CA |
| January 8, 1949 | | at California | W 63–54 | 8–4 (2–3) | Men's Gym; Berkeley, CA |
| January 14, 1949 | | at USC | W 74–68 | 9–4 (3–3) | Shrine Auditorium; Los Angeles, CA |
| January 15, 1949 | | USC | L 52–59 | 9–5 (3–4) | Men's Gym; Los Angeles, CA |
| January 28, 1949* | | Cal Poly | W 68–49 | 10–5 (4–4) | Men's Gym; Los Angeles, CA |
| January 29, 1949* | | Fresno State | W 77–33 | 11–5 | Men's Gym; Los Angeles, CA |
| February 3, 1949* | | 20th Century Fox | W 73–55 | 12–5 | Men's Gym; Los Angeles, CA |
| February 5, 1949* | | Pittsburgh | W 51–48 | 13–5 | Men's Gym; Los Angeles, CA |
| February 11, 1949 | | California | W 49–37 | 14–5 (5–4) | Men's Gym; Los Angeles, CA |
| February 12, 1949 | | No. 10 Stanford | W 59–48 | 15–5 (6–4) | Men's Gym; Los Angeles, CA |
| February 18, 1949 | | at California | W 45–42 | 16–5 (7–4) | Men's Gym; Berkeley, CA |
| February 19, 1949 | | at No. 20 Stanford | W 59–46 | 17–5 (8–4) | Stanford Pavilion; Stanford, CA |
| February 25, 1949 | | Stanford | W 56–50 | 18–5 (9–4) | Men's Gym; Los Angeles, CA |
| February 26, 1949* | | California | W 59–50 | 19–5 (10–4) | Men's Gym; Los Angeles, CA |
| March 4, 1949 | | at USC | W 51–50 | 20–5 (11–4) | Olympic Auditorium; Los Angeles, CA |
| March 5, 1949 | | USC | W 63–55 | 21–5 (12–4) | Men's Gym; Los Angeles, CA |
Conference Championship
| March 11, 1949 | No. 15 | at Oregon State; PCC Championship play-offs | L 41–53 | 21–6 | Men's Gymnasium; Corvallis, OR |
| March 12, 1949 | No. 15 | at Oregon State; PCC Championship play-offs | W 46–39 | 22–6 | Men's Gymnasium; Corvallis, OR |
| March 14, 1949 | No. 15 | at Oregon State; PCC Championship play-offs | L 35–41 | 22–7 | Men's Gymnasium; Corvallis, OR |
*Non-conference game. ^{#}Rankings from AP Poll. (#) Tournament seedings in parentheses. All times are in Pacific Time.
