= Vin Cronin =

American basketball coach (1906–1993)

Biographical details
- Born: September 7, 1906; Somerville, Massachusetts, U.S.
- Died: January 4, 1993 (aged 86); Somerville, Massachusetts, U.S.
- Education: Boston University

Coaching career (HC unless noted)
- 1942–1949: Somerville HS (MA)
- 1949–1952: Boston University
- 1953–1954: Mission HS (MA)

Head coaching record
- Overall: 23–29 (college)

Accomplishments and honors

Championships
- New England tournament (1949); 2 Massachusetts tournament (1944 and 1949); 5 Eastern Massachusetts Tech tournament (1942, 1943, 1944, 1945, and 1949)

Vincent R. Cronin (September 7, 1906 – January 4, 1993) was an American basketball coach who was the head men's basketball at Boston University from 1949 to 1952.

== Early life ==
Cronin born in Somerville, Massachusetts and was one of 12 children. He and raised by his older sisters after the death of his parents. He was a football and basketball star at Somerville High School and graduated in 1924. He then attended St. John's Preparatory School and Saint Anselm College.

== Coaching ==
In 1942, Cronin became the head boys' basketball coach at Somerville High. His teams won the Tech Tourney five times (1942, 1943, 1944, 1945, and 1949), the state championship twice (1944 and 1949), and the New England title once (1949). Many of his players went on to play in college, including Tony Lavelli and Ron Perry. In 1949, he became the head coach of the Boston University Terriers men's basketball team. He compiled a 23–29 record over his three seasons with the Terriers. While at BU, Cronin studied for his bachelor's degree in physical education, which he received in 1952.

After graduating, Cronin became a teacher in the Somerville school system. In 1953, he returned to coaching at Mission High School in Roxbury. In 1954, he was hospitalized with a "stimulated nervous condition" and on the advice of his doctor, gave up coaching. He retired from the Somerville Public Schools in 1977.

== Death ==
Cronin died on January 4, 1993 at his home in Somerville. He was survived by his wife, four sons, and two daughters.
