= Gill Coliseum =

Indoor arena in Corvallis, Oregon

- Ralph Miller Court
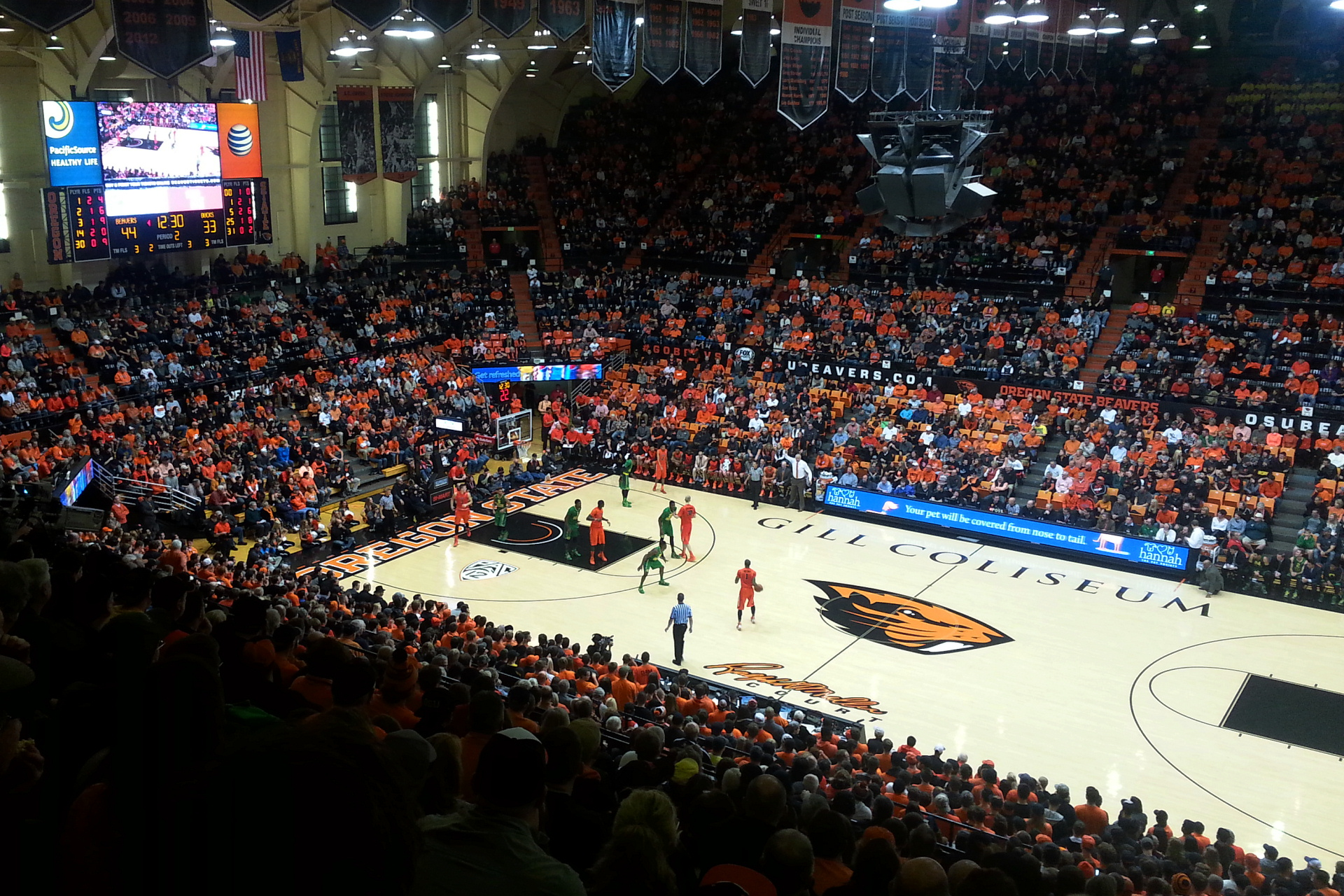
- Civil War against Oregon in January 2016

- Location in the United States Location in Oregon
- Interactive map of Gill Coliseum
- Former names: Oregon State Coliseum (1949–66)
- Address: 660 Southwest 26th Street
- Location: Oregon State University; Corvallis, Oregon, U.S.
- Coordinates: 44.5613°N 123.2805°W
- Owner: Oregon State University
- Operator: Oregon State University
- Capacity: 9,301 (current); 10,400 (1984–2011); 10,000 (1949–1984)

Construction
- Groundbreaking: June 5, 1947
- Opened: December 16, 1949; 76 years ago
- Cost: $1.842 million ($24.9 million in 2025)
- Architects: Jones and Marsh
- General contractor: J. C. Watts Construction Company

Tenants
- Oregon State Beavers (NCAA); OSAA Class 5A State Basketball Championships (1999–2006, 2007–2014) partial schedule

Gill Coliseum is a multi-purpose indoor arena in Corvallis, Oregon, located on the campus of Oregon State University. Opened in December 1949, the arena currently lists a seating capacity of 9,301 and is home to the Oregon State Beavers' basketball, wrestling, volleyball, and gymnastics teams. It is named after Amory T. "Slats" Gill, the Beavers' basketball coach for 36 seasons (from 1928 to 1964), who compiled a 599–392 (.604) record.

The court is named for another OSU head coach, Ralph Miller, who led the basketball program from 1971 to 1989. The building also houses a weight room, equipment center, locker rooms, and offices for the Oregon State University athletic department and its teams. Inside, on the south wall of Gill Coliseum is a painted mural of many former players, including Gary Payton, Brent Barry, A. C. Green, Lester Conner, and Steve Johnson.

The elevation at street level is approximately 230 feet (70 m) above sea level.

== History ==
Prior to the construction of Gill Coliseum, intercollegiate basketball games were hosted in Oregon Agricultural College's Men's Gymnasium, a 2,500 seat facility constructed in 1914. which continues to stand as the current Langton Hall.

Built at a cost of $1.8 million, the Coliseum opened in December 1949. The facility had an initial capacity of 10,000, with no seats having views obstructed by support pillars. The name "Gill Coliseum" was initially an informal and unofficial moniker in honor of the team's longtime and then-current head basketball coach Amory "Slats" Gill, with Oregon State initially prohibited by the state board of higher education from naming a building after a living individual.

The building also housed the Horner Museum in the basement until the museum's closure in 1995.

=== NCAA tournament ===
Gill Coliseum has hosted Western region games in the men's Division I NCAA tournament 11 times (1952, 1953, 1954, 1955, 1956, 1957, 1960, 1962, 1964, 1967, 1983). The most recent in 1983 was the West sub-regional of the 52-team tournament. It included eventual champion North Carolina State; in their opener on Friday night, the sixth-seeded Wolfpack (20–10) was down six points to #11 Pepperdine with less than a minute to go in the first overtime, then rallied and won in double overtime. It was the late game and finished after 2 am EST.

== Other features ==
The facility has a sports medicine center, located on the lower level of the coliseum, that provides injury prevention and rehabilitation services. The center includes cardiovascular equipment and improved training facilities. Part of a $7 million renovation of the arena in 2009 included making Gill compliant with the Americans with Disabilities Act. The renovation also included sandblasting the exterior and applying new paint. New windows were installed on the east and west sides of the coliseum. The court has gone numerous remodels as Oregon State has updated their branding. Prior to the 2013–14 season, the court was updated to reflect the athletic department's re-branding along with some graphics surrounding the lower seating.

Construction of the Sports Performance Center (SPC) began in early 2007, and work was completed in spring 2008. The building is located between Gill Coliseum and the Tommy Prothro Football Complex. The SPC houses a practice facility for wrestling and offices for the weight training staff. The 20,000-square-foot (1,900 m^{2}) building is the home to over $500,000 in training equipment and a four-lane 60-yard (55 m) sprint track. The four-story facility includes two full-size regulation courts and basketball offices which opened in June 2013.

== Gallery ==
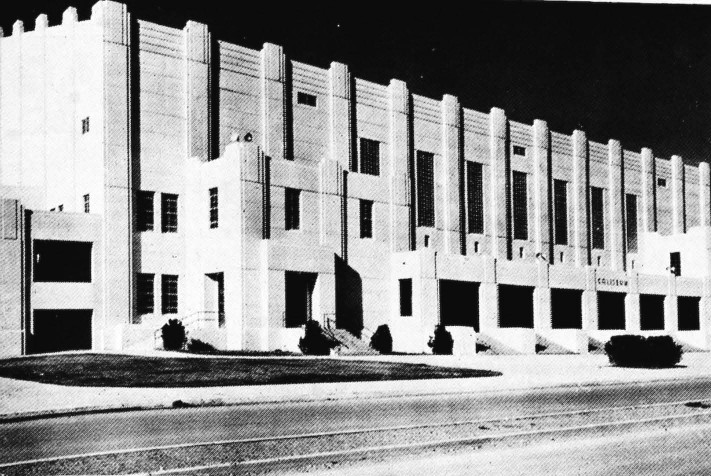
The exterior of Gill Coliseum in 1956

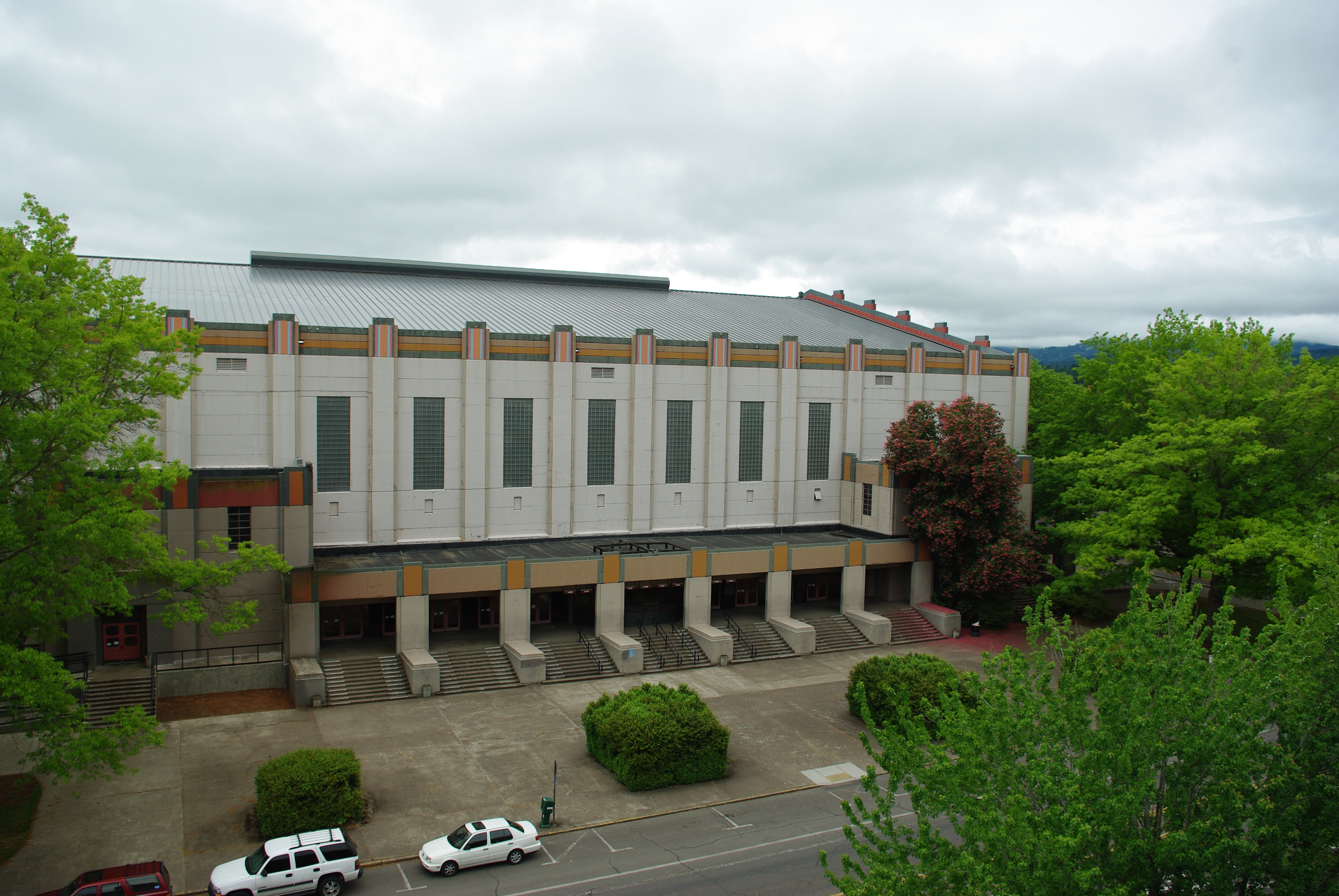
The facade of Gill Coliseum in May 2008

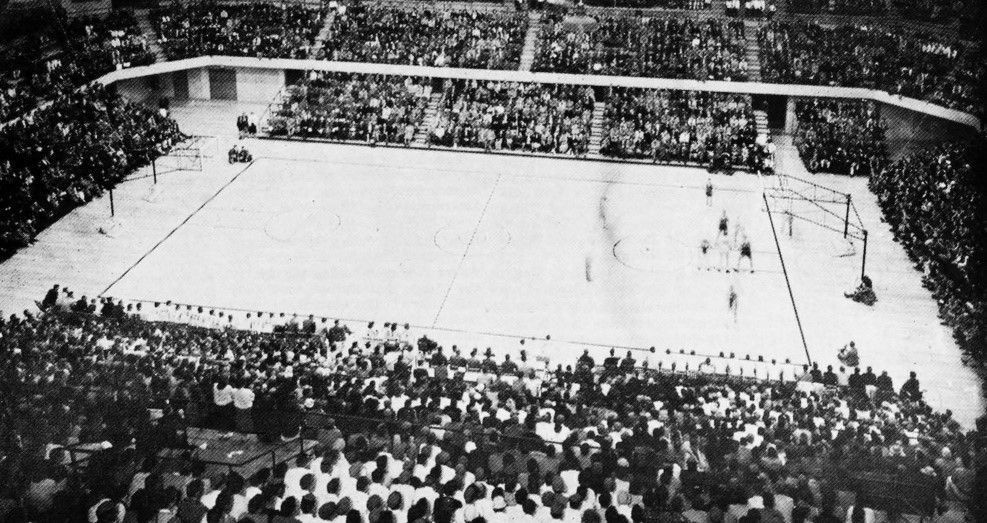
A basketball game in Gill Coliseum, circa 1956

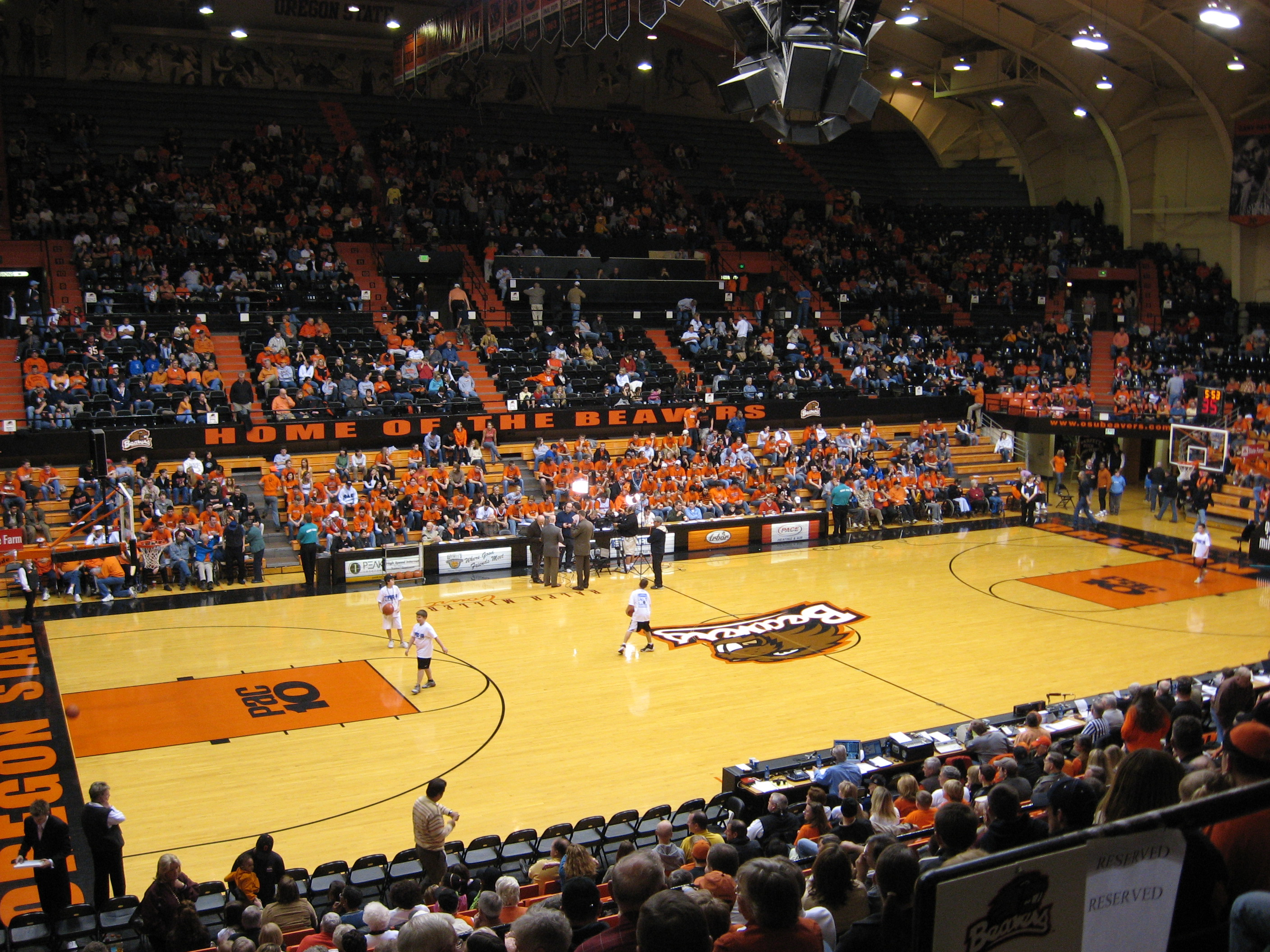
The basketball court at Gill Coliseum in 2007

== See also ==
- List of NCAA Division I basketball arenas
- Chiles Center
- McArthur Court
- Veterans Memorial Coliseum (Portland, Oregon)
