= Eugene Lambert (coach) =

American football and basketball player/ coach (1905–2000)

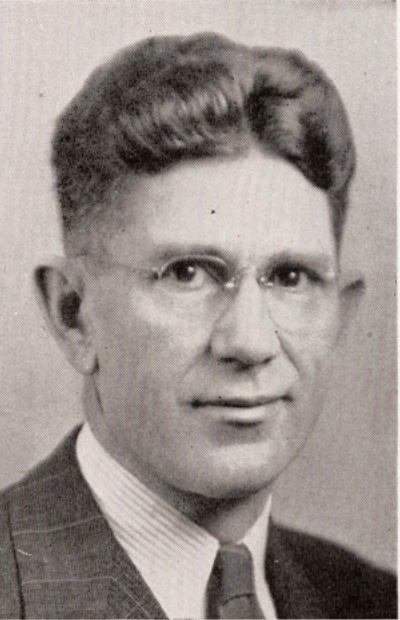

Biographical details
- Born: October 23, 1905; Searcy, Arkansas, U.S.
- Died: October 27, 2000 (aged 95); Williamson County, Texas, U.S.

Playing career

Football
- 1927–1928: Arkansas

Basketball
- 1928–1929: Arkansas

Coaching career (HC unless noted)

Basketball
- 1929–1930: Texarkana HS (TX)
- 1931–1932: Taylor HS (TX)
- 1933–1934: North Texas Aggies
- 1935–1937: Kenyon
- 1938–1941: Arkansas (assistant)
- 1942–1949: Arkansas
- 1951–1956: Memphis State
- 1956–1960: Alabama

Football
- 1929–1930: Texarkana HS (TX)
- 1931–1932: Taylor HS (TX)
- 1933–1934: North Texas Aggies
- 1935–1936: Kenyon

Administrative career (AD unless noted)
- 1942–1944: Arkansas
- 1950: Arkansas A&M
- 1960–1966: Memphis State

Head coaching record
- Overall: 6–7–1 (college football); 264–170 (college basketball); 12–4–5 (junior college football)

Accomplishments and honors

Championships
- Football; 1 CTC (1934)

Eugene Wasdon Lambert Sr. (October 23, 1905 – October 27, 2000) was an American football and basketball coach and college athletics administrator. He served as head basketball coach at North Texas Agricultural (now the University of Texas at Arlington), Kenyon, Arkansas, Memphis State, and Alabama. He served as head tennis coach in 1957 at the University of Alabama, and head football coach at both North Texas Agricultural and Kenyon.

== Coaching career ==
After he graduated from Arkansas, Lambert coached at both Texarkana and Taylor High Schools before taking his first collegiate coaching position at North Texas Agricultural College in 1933. At North Texas, he coached both the basketball team and the football team which he led to an overall record of eleven wins, four losses and five ties (11–4–5). From North Texas, Lambert moved to Kenyon College where he again coached both the men's basketball and football teams. During his two-year tenure with the Lords, he led the basketball team to an overall record of 15 wins and 16 losses (15–16) and the football team to an overall record of six wins, seven losses and one tie (6–7–1).

From Kenyon, Lambert returned to Arkansas as an assistant coach and became the head coach for the 1942 season. While with the Razorbacks, he led Arkansas to an overall record of 113 wins and 60 losses (113–60), two Southwest Conference championships and invitations to three and appearances in two NCAA Tournaments. After he served for one year as the athletic director at Arkansas A&M, Lambert returned to the coaching ranks as the head coach at Memphis State. While with the Tigers, he led Memphis State to an overall record of 87 wins and 45 losses (87–45) two appearances in two NCAA Tournaments. In April 1956, Lambert was hired to serve as head coach at Alabama. While with the Crimson Tide, he led Alabama to an overall record of 49 wins and 49 losses (49–49). In 1957 Lambert also served as the head tennis coach for the Alabama Crimson Tide. He then resigned from Alabama in April 1960 to become athletic director at Memphis State. He remained as the Tigers' athletic director through his resignation in 1966.

== Head coaching record ==
=== College football ===
Year	Team	Overall	Conference	Standing	Bowl/playoffs
Kenyon Lords (Ohio Athletic Conference) (1935–1936)
1935	Kenyon	3–3–1	1–1–1	11th	
1936	Kenyon	3–4	1–3	T–14th	
Kenyon:		6–7–1	2–4–1		
Total:		6–7–1			

=== College basketball ===
Record table
Season	Team	Overall	Conference	Standing	Postseason
Kenyon Lords (Ohio Athletic Conference) (1935–1937)
1935–36	Kenyon	7–11			
1936–37	Kenyon	8–5			
Kenyon:		15–16			
Arkansas Razorbacks (Southwest Conference) (1942–1949)
1942–43	Arkansas	19–7	8–4	3rd	
1943–44	Arkansas	16–8	11–1	T-1st	
1944–45	Arkansas	17–9	9–3	2nd	NCAA Final Four
1945–46	Arkansas	16–7	9–3	2nd	
1946–47	Arkansas	14–10	8–4	T–2nd	
1947–48	Arkansas	16–8	8–4	3rd	
1948–49	Arkansas	15–11	9–3	T–1st	NCAA Quarterfinals
Arkansas:		113–60	62–22		
Memphis State Tigers (Independent) (1951–1956)
1951–52	Memphis State	25–10			
1952–53	Memphis State	10–14			
1953–54	Memphis State	15–9			
1954–55	Memphis State	17–5			NCAA First Round
1955–56	Memphis State	20–7			NCAA Quarterfinals
Memphis State:		87–45			
Alabama Crimson Tide (Southeastern Conference) (1956–1960)
1956–57	Alabama	15–11	7–7	7th	
1957–58	Alabama	17–9	9–5		
1958–59	Alabama	10–12	6–8	7th	
1959–60	Alabama	7–17	4–10	10th	
Alabama:		49–49	26–30		
Total:		264–170			
National champion Postseason invitational champion Conference regular season champion Conference regular season and conference tournament champion Division regular season champion Division regular season and conference tournament champion Conference tournament champion

=== Junior college football ===
Year	Team	Overall	Conference	Standing	Bowl/playoffs
North Texas Aggies (Central Texas Conference) (1933–1934)
1933	North Texas Aggies	4–2–4	1–2–2	T–4th	
1934	North Texas Aggies	8–2–1	3–0–1	1st	
North Texas Aggies:		12–4–5	5–2–3		
Total:		12–4–5			
National championship Conference title Conference division title or championship game berth

== See also ==
- List of NCAA Division I men's basketball tournament Final Four appearances by coach
