= 1948–49 Oklahoma A&M Aggies men's basketball team =

American college basketball season

1948–49 Oklahoma A&M Aggies men's basketball

NCAA tournament, Runner-up MVC Season Champions

National Championship Game, L 36–46 vs. Kentucky
- Conference: Missouri Valley Conference

Ranking
- AP: No. 2
- Record: 23–5 (9–1 MVC)
- Head coach: Henry Iba
- Home arena: Gallagher Hall

1948–49 Missouri Valley Conference men's basketball standings
	Conf.				Overall
Team	W		L	PCT	W		L	PCT
No. 2 Oklahoma A&M	9	–	1	.900	23	–	5	.821
No. 3 Saint Louis	8	–	2	.800	22	–	4	.846
No. 7 Bradley	6	–	4	.600	27	–	8	.771
Drake	4	–	6	.400	13	–	13	.500
Wichita State	3	–	7	.300	10	–	16	.385
Tulsa	0	–	10	.000	4	–	20	.167
Rankings from AP Poll

The 1948–49 Oklahoma A&M Aggies men's basketball team represented Oklahoma A&M College, now known as Oklahoma State University, in NCAA competition in the 1948–49 season.

== NCAA tournament ==
- West
  - Oklahoma A&M 40, Wyoming 39
- Final Four
  - Oklahoma A&M 55, Oregon State 30
- Finals
  - Kentucky 46, Oklahoma A&M 36

== Team players drafted into the NBA ==
Round	Player	NBA club
1	Bob Harris	Fort Wayne Pistons
