= 1948–49 Washington State Cougars men's basketball team =

American college basketball season

1948–49 Washington State Cougars men's basketball
- Conference: Pacific Coast Conference
- Record: 21–9 (8–8 PCC)
- Head coach: Jack Friel (21st season)
- Home arena: Bohler Gymnasium

1948–49 Pacific Coast Conference men's basketball standings
	Conf.				Overall
Team	W		L	PCT	W		L	PCT
North
Oregon State †	12	–	4	.750	24	–	12	.667
Washington State	8	–	8	.500	21	–	9	.700
Oregon	7	–	9	.438	12	–	18	.400
Idaho	7	–	9	.438	17	–	15	.531
Washington	6	–	10	.375	11	–	15	.423
South
No. 15 UCLA	10	–	2	.833	22	–	7	.759
USC	8	–	4	.667	14	–	10	.583
Stanford	5	–	7	.417	19	–	9	.679
California	1	–	11	.083	14	–	19	.424
† Conference playoff series winner Rankings from AP Poll

The 1948–49 Washington State Cougars men's basketball team represented Washington State College for the 1948–49 college basketball season. Led by 21st-year head coach Jack Friel, the Cougars were members of the Pacific Coast Conference and played their home games on campus at Bohler Gymnasium in Pullman, Washington.

The Cougars were 21–9 overall in the regular season and 8–8 in conference play, second place in the Northern division.
