= 1949 NCAA basketball tournament =

Edition of USA college basketball tournament

- Season: 1948–49
- Teams: 8
- Finals site: Hec Edmundson Pavilion, Seattle, Washington
- Champions: Kentucky Wildcats (2nd title, 2nd title game, 3rd Final Four)
- Runner-up: Oklahoma A&M Aggies (3rd title game, 3rd Final Four)
- Semifinalists: Illinois Fighting Illini (1st Final Four); Oregon State Beavers (1st Final Four)
- Winning coach: Adolph Rupp (2nd title)
- MOP: Alex Groza (Kentucky)
- Attendance: 72,523
- Top scorer: Alex Groza (Kentucky) (82 points)

The 1949 NCAA basketball tournament involved eight schools playing in single-elimination play to determine the national champion of men's NCAA Division I college basketball. The 11th annual edition of the tournament began on March 18, 1949, and ended with the championship game on March 26, at Hec Edmundson Pavilion, located on the campus of the University of Washington in Seattle. A total of 10 games were played, including a third place game in each region and a national third place game.

Kentucky, coached by Adolph Rupp, won the national title with a 46–36 victory in the final game over Oklahoma A&M, coached by Henry Iba. Alex Groza of Kentucky was named the tournament's Most Outstanding Player.

== Locations ==
The following were the sites selected to host each round of the 1949 tournament:

=== Regionals ===
March 18 and 19
West Regional, Municipal Auditorium, Kansas City, Missouri (Host: Missouri Valley Conference)
March 21 and 22
East Regional, Madison Square Garden, New York, New York (Host: Metropolitan New York Conference)

=== Championship Game ===
March 26
Hec Edmundson Pavilion, Seattle, Washington (Host: University of Washington)

== Teams ==
Region	Team	Coach	Conference	Finished	Final Opponent	Score
East
East	Illinois	Harry Combes	Big Ten	Third Place	Oregon State	W 57–53
East	Kentucky	Adolph Rupp	Southeastern	Champion	Oklahoma A&M	W 46–36
East	Villanova	Alex Severance	Independent	Regional third place	Yale	W 78–67
East	Yale	Howard Hobson	Ivy League	Regional Fourth Place	Villanova	L 78–67
West
West	Arkansas	Eugene Lambert	Southwest	Regional third place	Wyoming	W 61–48
West	Oklahoma A&M	Henry Iba	Missouri Valley	Runner Up	Kentucky	L 46–36
West	Oregon State	Slats Gill	Pacific Coast	Fourth Place	Illinois	L 57–53
West	Wyoming	Everett Shelton	Mountain States	Regional Fourth Place	Arkansas	L 61–48

== Bracket ==
Quarterfinals
#4 Illinois	71
#11 Yale	67
#1 Kentucky	85
#14 Villanova	72
#2 Oklahoma A&M	40
#17 Wyoming	39
Oregon State	56
Arkansas	38

Semifinals
#4 Illinois	47
#1 Kentucky	76
#2 Oklahoma A&M	55
Oregon State	30

Finals
#1 Kentucky	46
#2 Oklahoma A&M	36
Third place
#4 Illinois	57
Oregon State	53

=== Regional third place games ===
East Regional third place
#11 Yale	67
#14 Villanova	78

West Regional third place
#17 Wyoming	48
Arkansas	61

== See also ==
- 1949 National Invitation Tournament
- 1949 NAIA Basketball Tournament
