= 1948–49 NCAA men's basketball rankings =

- Season: 1948–49
- NCAA Tournament: 1949
- NCAA Tournament Champions: Kentucky
NCAA men's basketball rankings
1949–50 →

The 1948–49 NCAA men's basketball rankings was made up of a single human poll – the AP Poll – with weekly editions released between January 18, 1949, and March 8, 1949.

== Legend ==
	Increase in ranking
	Decrease in ranking
	New to rankings from previous week
Italics	Number of first place votes
(#–#)	Win–loss record
т	Tied with team above or below also with this symbol

== AP Poll ==
This was the initial season for the AP college basketball poll. It was modeled after its college football poll, which began in the mid-1930s.

	Week 1 Jan. 17	Week 2 Jan. 24	Week 3 Jan. 31	Week 4 Feb. 7	Week 5 Feb. 14	Week 6 Feb. 21	Week 7 Feb. 28	Final Mar. 8	
1.	Saint Louis (11–0) (69)	Saint Louis (12–1) (39)	Kentucky (13–1) (39)	Kentucky (17–1)	Kentucky (20–1)	Kentucky (22–1)	Kentucky (25–1)	Kentucky (29–1)	1.
2.	Kentucky (11–1) (16)	Kentucky (12–1) (33)	Saint Louis (13–1) (25)	Saint Louis (15–1)	Saint Louis (16–2)	Saint Louis (18–2)	Oklahoma A&M (19–4)	Oklahoma A&M (20–4)	2.
3.	Western Kentucky (12–0) (2)	Oklahoma A&M (10–2) (15)	Oklahoma A&M (11–2) (4)	Oklahoma A&M (13–2)	Oklahoma A&M (16–3)	Oklahoma A&M (17–3)	Saint Louis (19–3)	Saint Louis (20–3)	3.
4.	Minnesota (12–0) (3)	Western Kentucky (15–0) (9)	Illinois (13–1) (1)	Illinois (14–2)	Illinois (16–2)	Illinois (16–2)	Illinois (19–2)	Illinois (19–2)	4.
5.	Oklahoma A&M (9–2) (3)	Minnesota (13–0) (8)	Minnesota (13–1)	Hamline (15–0)	Tulane (19–2)	Minnesota (16–2)	Minnesota (18–2)	Western Kentucky (25–3)	5.
6.	San Francisco (13–1)	Illinois (12–1)	Western Kentucky (16–1) (1)	Western Kentucky (17–2)	Minnesota (15–2)	Tulane (20–2)	Western Kentucky (25–3)	Minnesota (18–3)	6.
7.	Illinois (12–1)	Hamline (13–0)	Villanova (12–1)	Minnesota (14–2)	Western Kentucky (20–3)	Western Kentucky (22–3)	Tulane (21–3)	Bradley (25–6)	7.
8.	Hamline (11–0)	Villanova (11–0)	Hamline (14–0)	Tulane (18–2)	San Francisco (19–4)	San Francisco (20–5)	San Francisco (21–5)	San Francisco (21–5)	8.
9.	Villanova (11–0)	San Francisco (15–2)	Stanford (17–2) (1)	San Francisco (18–3)	Hamline (17–1)	Bowling Green (18–6)	Bowling Green (20–6)	Tulane (24–4)	9.
10.	Utah (10–2)	Utah (13–2)	San Francisco (16–2)	Stanford (17–3)	Bowling Green (16–6)	Bradley (23–4)	Bradley (25–5)	Bowling Green (21–6)	10.
11.	Tulane (13–2)	Stanford (15–2)	Tulane (15–2)	Loyola-Chicago (16–3)	Butler (15–3)	Butler (17–3)	Butler (18–5)	Yale (21–5)	11.
12.	Loyola-Chicago (11–2)	Tulane (15–2)	Utah (14–3)	Utah (16–4)	Bradley (22–4)	Loyola-Chicago (18–4)	Wyoming (22–8)	Utah (24–7)	12.
13.	Cincinnati (8–1)	Loyola-Chicago (13–2)	Loyola-Chicago (14–2)	Villanova (13–3)	Loyola-Chicago (16–4)	Yale (18–4)	Utah (23–6)	NC State (25–8)	13.
14.	Holy Cross (8–5)	Washington State (18–1)	Bowling Green (10–6)	Bowling Green (12–6)	Utah (18–5)	Wyoming (22–6)	Loyola-Chicago (21–5)	Villanova (20–3)	14.
15.	Bowling Green (9–6)	NC State (11–7) (1)	NYU (7–3) т	Holy Cross (12–5)	Villanova (15–3)	Hamline (19–3)	NC State (22–8)	UCLA (21–5)	15.
16.	Bradley (15–3)	DePaul (10–6)	Butler (12–3) т	Butler (13–3)	Oklahoma (11–5)	Utah (20–6)	Hamline (23–3)	Loyola-Chicago (22–5)	16.
17.	Stanford (11–2)	Butler (11–3)	NC State (14–7)	Washington State (18–2)	DePaul (14–7) т	Duquesne (15–4)	Villanova (18–3)	Wyoming (24–8)	17.
18.	Washington State (17–1) т	Baylor (10–6) т	Bradley (19–3)	Ohio State (9–4)	NC State (17–8) т	Ohio State (11–6)	Yale (19–5)	Butler (18–5)	18.
19.	Butler (9–2) т	Bradley (18–3) т	Holy Cross (9–5)	Wyoming (17–6)	Wyoming (20–6) т	USC (12–8)	Ohio State (13–7)	Hamline (23–3)	19.
20.	NYU (7–3)	Holy Cross (9–5)	Eastern Kentucky (12–3)	Duquesne (13–2)	Duquesne (15–3) т Stanford (17–5) т Yale (15–4) т	Texas (16–5)	Arkansas (12–10)	Ohio State (14–7)	20.
	Week 1 Jan. 17	Week 2 Jan. 24	Week 3 Jan. 31	Week 4 Feb. 7	Week 5 Feb. 14	Week 6 Feb. 21	Week 7 Feb. 28	Final Mar. 8	
		Dropped: Cincinnati (8–3); Bowling Green (9–6); NYU (7–3)	Dropped: Washington State (18–2); DePaul; Baylor	Dropped: NYU; NC State; Bradley; Eastern Kentucky	Dropped: Holy Cross; Washington State; Ohio State (9–6)	Dropped: Villanova; Oklahoma; DePaul; NC State; Stanford	Dropped: Duquesne; USC; Texas	Dropped: Arkansas (14–10)	
