= 1948–49 Kentucky Wildcats men's basketball team =

1948–49 season of University of Kentucky men's basketball team

1948–49 Kentucky Wildcats men's basketball
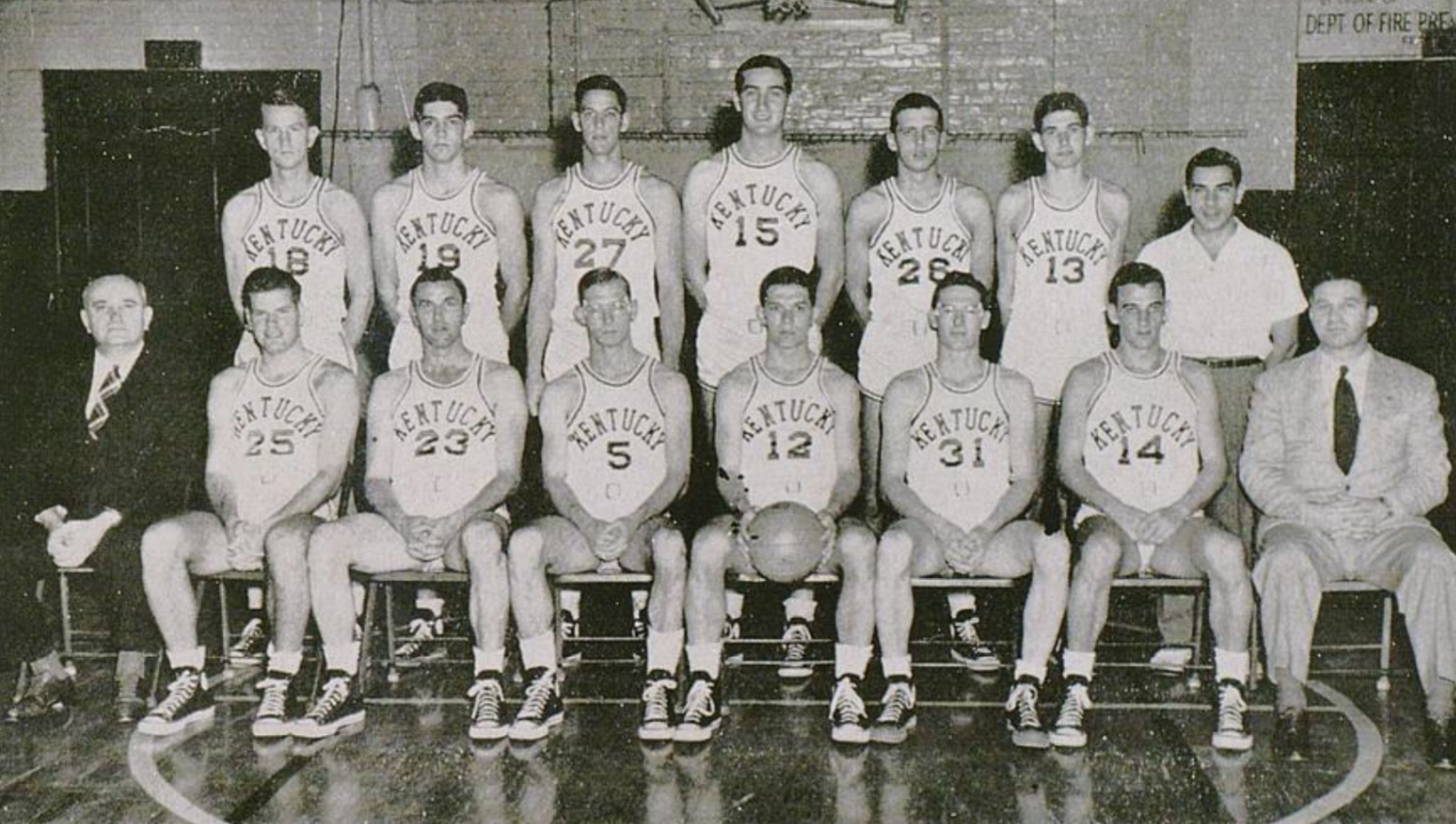

NCAA tournament National champions NCAA men's basketball regular season champions SEC regular season and tournament champions

National Championship Game, W 46–36 vs. Oklahoma A&M
- Conference: Southeast Conference

Ranking
- AP: No. 1
- Record: 32–2 (13–0 SEC)
- Head coach: Adolph Rupp
- Assistant coach: Harry Lancaster
- Home arena: Alumni Gymnasium

1948–49 Southeastern Conference men's basketball standings
	Conf.				Overall
Team	W		L	PCT	W		L	PCT
No. 1 Kentucky	13	–	0	1.000	32	–	2	.941
No. 9 Tulane	12	–	3	.800	24	–	4	.857
Tennessee	8	–	3	.727	19	–	7	.731
Vanderbilt	9	–	5	.643	14	–	8	.636
LSU	7	–	6	.538	15	–	10	.600
Alabama	9	–	9	.500	13	–	12	.520
Georgia Tech	7	–	9	.438	11	–	13	.458
Georgia	6	–	9	.400	17	–	13	.567
Florida	4	–	8	.333	11	–	16	.407
Auburn	5	–	11	.313	9	–	15	.375
Ole Miss	4	–	12	.250	8	–	13	.381
Mississippi State	3	–	12	.200	4	–	13	.235
† 1949 SEC Tournament winner Rankings from AP Poll

The 1948–49 Kentucky Wildcats men's basketball team represented University of Kentucky. The head coach was Adolph Rupp. The team was a member of the Southeast Conference and played their home games at Alumni Gymnasium.

== Roster ==
1948–49 Kentucky Wildcats men's basketball team
Players
Coaches

Pos.	#	Name	Height	Weight	Year	Hometown
G	12	Ralph Beard	—	—	Sr
	15	Alex Groza	—	—	Sr
	18	Dale Barnstable	—	—
F	19	Walter Hirsch	6 ft 4 in (1.93 m)	175 lb (79 kg)	So	Dayton, Ohio
	23	Cliff Barker	—	—	Sr
F	25	Jim Line	—	—	Jr	Akron, Ohio
F	27	Wallace Jones	—	—	Sr
	31	Joe Hall	—	—

Head coach

- Adolph Rupp (Kansas)

Assistant coach(es)

Legend

- (C) Team captain
- (S) Suspended
- (I) Ineligible
- (W) Walk-on
- Injured
- Current redshirt

== NCAA tournament ==
- East
  - Kentucky 85, Villanova 72
- Final Four
  - Kentucky 76, Illinois 47
- Finals
  - Kentucky 46, Oklahoma A&M 36

== Team players drafted into the NBA ==
Round	Player	NBA club
1	Alex Groza	Indianapolis Jets
1	Wallace Jones	Washington Capitols
2	Ralph Beard	Chicago Stags
5	Cliff Barker	Washington Capitols
