= 1948–49 Wyoming Cowboys basketball team =

American college basketball season

1948–49 Wyoming Cowboys basketball

MSC Champions

NCAA Men's Division I Tournament, Regional Semifinals
- Conference: Mountain States Conference

Ranking
- AP: No. 17
- Record: (25-10) ( Skyline Six)
- Head coach: Everett Shelton

The 1948–49 Wyoming Cowboys basketball team represented the University of Wyoming in NCAA men's competition in the 1948–49 season. The Cowboys qualified for the 1949 NCAA Tournament.

== NCAA basketball tournament ==
- West
  - Oklahoma A&M 40, Wyoming 39

== Team Players in the NBA ==
The following were selected in the 1949 BAA Draft.

Player	NBA Team
Ron Livingstone	Baltimore Bullets
