= Wyoming Cowboys basketball statistical leaders =

The Wyoming Cowboys basketball statistical leaders are individual statistical leaders of the Wyoming Cowboys basketball program in various categories, including points, assists, blocks, rebounds, and steals. Within those areas, the lists identify single-game, single-season, and career leaders. The Cowboys represent the University of Wyoming in the NCAA's Mountain West Conference.

Wyoming began competing in intercollegiate basketball in 1904. However, the school's record book does not generally list records from before the 1950s, as records from before this period are often incomplete and inconsistent. Since scoring was much lower in this era, and teams played much fewer games during a typical season, it is likely that few or no players from this era would appear on these lists anyway.

The NCAA did not officially record assists as a stat until the 1983–84 season, and blocks and steals until the 1985–86 season, but Wyoming's record books includes players in these stats before these seasons. These lists are updated through the end of the 2021–22 season.

== Scoring ==
Career
Rk	Player	Points	Seasons
1	Fennis Dembo	2,311	1984–85 1985–86 1986–87 1987–88
2	Brandon Ewing	2,168	2005–06 2006–07 2007–08 2008–09
3	Hunter Maldonado	2,158	2017–18 2018–19 2019–20 2020–21 2021–22 2022–23
4	Justin James	2,061	2015–16 2016–17 2017–18 2018–19
5	Flynn Robinson	2,049	1962–63 1963–64 1964–65
6	Eric Leckner	1,938	1984–85 1985–86 1986–87 1987–88
7	Josh Adams	1,819	2012–13 2013–14 2014–15 2015–16
8	Reginald Slater	1,809	1988–89 1989–90 1990–91 1991–92
9	Charles Bradley	1,744	1977–78 1978–79 1979–80 1980–81
10	Jeron Roberts	1,599	1994–95 1995–96 1996–97 1997–98

Season
Rk	Player	Points	Season
1	Josh Adams	740	2015–16
2	Justin James	706	2018–19
3	Flynn Robinson	701	1964–65
4	Fennis Dembo	689	1986–87
5	Flynn Robinson	682	1962–63
6	Flynn Robinson	666	1963–64
7	Fennis Dembo	653	1987–88
8	Graham Ike	644	2021–22
9	Joe Capua	637	1955–56
10	Eric Leckner	634	1986–87

Single game
Rk	Player	Points	Season	Opponent
1	Joe Capua	51	1955–56	Montana
2	Tony Windis	50	1957–58	New Mexico
3	Maurice Alexander	49	1990–91	New Mexico
4	Flynn Robinson	48	1963–64	Arizona St.
5	Stan Dodds	45	1969–70	Arizona State
6	Dick Sherman	44	1965–66	Rhode Island
7	Joe Capua	42	1955–56	Utah State
8	Jay Straight	41	2004–05	Colorado State
	Fennis Dembo	41	1986–87	UCLA
10	Flynn Robinson	40	1964–65	Utah
	Flynn Robinson	40	1963–64	Air Force
	Flynn Robinson	40	1962–63	Denver

== Rebounds ==
Career
Rk	Player	Rebounds	Seasons
1	Reginald Slater	1,197	1988–89 1989–90 1990–91 1991–92
2	Josh Davis	956	1998–99 1999–00 2000–01 2001–02
3	Fennis Dembo	954	1984–85 1985–86 1986–87 1987–88
4	HL Coleman	939	1993–94 1994–95 1995–96 1996–97
5	Leon Clark	889	1963–64 1964–65 1965–66
6	Bill Garnett	840	1978–79 1979–80 1980–81 1981–82
7	Kenneth Ollie	833	1977–78 1978–79 1979–80 1980–81
8	Carl Ashley	818	1967–68 1968–69 1969–70
9	Hunter Maldonado	808	2017–18 2018–19 2019–20 2020–21 2021–22 2022–23
10	Larry Nance Jr.	807	2011–12 2012–13 2013–14 2014–15

Season
Rk	Player	Rebounds	Season
1	Reginald Slater	331	1990–91
2	Justin Williams	329	2005–06
3	Reginald Slater	328	1989–90
4	Reginald Slater	327	1991–92
5	Graham Ike	317	2021–22
6	Hayden Dalton	316	2016–17
7	Leon Clark	315	1964–65
8	Ron Rivers	314	1952–53
9	HL Coleman	303	1996–97
10	Leon Clark	302	1965–66

Single game
Rk	Player	Rebounds	Season	Opponent
1	Reginald Slater	27	1991–92	Troy St.
2	Leon Clark	24	1965–66	Arizona
3	HL Coleman	23	1996–97	UNLV
	Carl Ashley	23	1968–69	Utah
	Randy Richardson	23	1962–63	Arizona St.
6	Adam Waddell	22	2009–10	Utah
	Jerry Brucks	22	1970–71	Regis
	Leon Clark	22	1964–65	Brigham Young
	Fred Gish	22	1961–62	Utah
10	Carl Ashley	21	1969–70	Air Force
	Gary VonKrosigk	21	1966–67	Utah
	Leon Clark	21	1965–66	Idaho State
	LeRoy Hulsebus	21	1958–59	New Mexico
	Dave Bradley	21	1955–56	Villanova

== Assists ==
Career
Rk	Player	Assists	Seasons
1	Hunter Maldonado	630	2017–18 2018–19 2019–20 2020–21 2021–22 2022–23
2	Sean Dent	502	1983–84 1985–86 1986–87 1987–88
3	Brandon Ewing	471	2005–06 2006–07 2007–08 2008–09
4	Jay Straight	453	2001–02 2002–03 2003–04 2004–05
5	Chris McMillian	434	1998–99 1999–00 2000–01 2001–02 2002–03
6	Fennis Dembo	410	1984–85 1985–86 1986–87 1987–88
7	Josh Adams	398	2012–13 2013–14 2014–15 2015–16
8	Mike Jackson	357	1979–80 1980–81 1981–82 1982–83
9	Brad Jones	351	2005–06 2006–07 2007–08
10	JayDee Luster	344	2009–10 2010–11 2011–12

Season
Rk	Player	Assists	Season
1	Hunter Maldonado	207	2020–21
2	Sean Dent	183	1986–87
3	Brandon Ewing	166	2008–09
	Sean Dent	166	1985–86
5	Jay Straight	148	2004–05
6	Maurice Alexander	147	1991–92
7	Brad Jones	135	2006–07
8	Justin James	133	2018–19
9	Hunter Maldonado	132	2019–20
10	Chris McMillian	130	1998–99

Single game
Rk	Player	Assists	Season	Opponent
1	Jay Straight	15	2003–04	Winthrop
2	Mike Jackson	14	1982–83	Colorado
3	Chris McMillian	13	2000–01	Delaware St.
4	Jay Straight	12	2004–05	New Mexico
	Hunter Maldonado	12	2021–22	SJSU
6	JayDee Luster	11	2009–10	Peru State
	Brandon Ewing	11	2008–09	Sacramento St.
	Sean Dent	11	1985–86	Air Force
	Hunter Maldonado	11	2021–22	SDSU
	Hunter Maldonado	11	2022–23	Nevada

== Steals ==
Career
Rk	Player	Steals	Seasons
1	Sean Dent	249	1983–84 1985–86 1986–87 1987–88
2	Hunter Maldonado	188	2017–18 2018–19 2019–20 2020–21 2021–22 2022–23
3	Fennis Dembo	176	1984–85 1985–86 1986–87 1987–88
4	Brandon Ewing	161	2005–06 2006–07 2007–08 2008–09
5	LaDrell Whitehead	150	1994–95 1995–96 1996–97
6	Josh Adams	144	2012–13 2013–14 2014–15 2015–16
7	Larry Nance Jr.	141	2011–12 2012–13 2013–14 2014–15
8	Josh Davis	140	1998–99 1999–00 2000–01 2001–02
9	Chris McMillian	136	1998–99 1999–00 2000–01 2001–02 2002–03
10	Jay Straight	126	2001–02 2002–03 2003–04 2004–05

Season
Rk	Player	Steals	Season
1	Sean Dent	93	1985–86
2	Sean Dent	75	1986–87
3	LaDrell Whitehead	70	1995–96
4	Desmar Jackson	61	2010–11
	Sean Dent	61	1987–88
6	Anthony Blake	59	1998–99
7	Maurice Alexander	58	1990–91
8	Luke Martinez	54	2011–12
9	David Murray	53	1993–94
10	Chris McMillian	52	1998–99

Single game
Rk	Player	Steals	Season	Opponent
1	Luke Martinez	9	2012–13	Illinois St.
2	Steve Leven	7	2005–06	Washington St.
	Anthony Blakes	7	1998–99	TCU
	Sean Dent	7	1986–87	Denver
5	Desmar Jackson	6	2010–11	Kennesaw St.
	Brad Jones	6	2006–07	Colorado Mines
	Marcus Bailey	6	2001–02	Colorado St.
	Anthony Blakes	6	1999–00	San Diego St.
	Anthony Blakes	6	1998–99	Tulsa
	LaDrell Whitehead	6	1994–95	Denver
	David Murray	6	1992–93	Brigham Young
	Sean Dent	6	1987–88	Denver
	Sean Dent	6	1985–86	Air Force

== Blocks ==
Career
Rk	Player	Blocks	Seasons
1	Theo Ratliff	425	1991–92 1992–93 1993–94 1994–95
2	Justin Williams	244	2004–05 2005–06
3	Alan Herndon	184	2014–15 2015–16 2016–17 2017–18
4	Josh Davis	173	1998–99 1999–00 2000–01 2001–02
5	Eric Leckner	164	1984–85 1985–86 1986–87 1987–88
6	Larry Nance Jr.	135	2011–12 2012–13 2013–14 2014–15
7	Reginald Slater	100	1988–89 1989–90 1990–91 1991–92
8	Bill Garnett	97	1978–79 1979–80 1980–81 1981–82
9	Djibril Thiam	95	2008–09 2009–10 2010–11

Season
Rk	Player	Blocks	Season
1	Justin Williams	163	2005–06
2	Theo Ratliff	144	1994–95
3	Theo Ratliff	124	1992–93
4	Theo Ratliff	114	1993–94
5	Justin Williams	81	2004–05
6	Alan Herndon	74	2016–17
7	Alan Herndon	72	2017–18
8	Reggie Page	60	1989–90
9	Larry Nance Jr.	55	2013–14
	Leonard Washington	55	2012–13

Single game
Rk	Player	Blocks	Season	Opponent
1	Justin Williams	12	2005–06	Utah
2	Justin Williams	11	2005–06	BYU
	Theo Ratliff	11	1993–94	Brigham Young
	Theo Ratliff	11	1994–95	Mississippi St.
5	Theo Ratliff	10	1992–93	San Diego St.
6	Justin Williams	9	2005–06	Charlotte
	Theo Ratliff	9	1994–95	Iowa State
	Theo Ratliff	9	1992–93	UTEP
	Theo Ratliff	9	1992–93	Marshall
	Theo Ratliff	9	1992–93	Louisiana Tech
