= Memphis Grizzlies all-time roster =

The following is a list of players, both past and current, who have appeared in at least one game for the Vancouver (1995–2001) or Memphis Grizzlies (2001–present) National Basketball Association (NBA) franchise.

== Players ==
Note: Statistics are correct through the end of the 2025–26 season.

G	Guard	G/F	Guard-forward	F	Forward	F/C	Forward-center	C	Center

legend
^	Denotes player who has been inducted to the Naismith Memorial Basketball Hall of Fame
*	Denotes player who has been selected for at least one All-Star Game with the Memphis Grizzlies and is currently on the team roster
^{+}	Denotes player who has been selected for at least one All-Star Game with the Memphis Grizzlies
^{x}	Denotes player who is currently on the Memphis Grizzlies roster
0.0	Denotes the Memphis Grizzlies statistics leader (min. 100 games played for the team for per-game statistics)

=== A to B ===
All-time roster
Player	Pos.	Pre-draft team	Yrs	Seasons	Statistics									Ref.
Player	Pos.	Pre-draft team	Yrs	Seasons	GP	MP	REB	AST	PTS	MPG	RPG	APG	PPG	Ref.
Mahmoud Abdul-Rauf	G	LSU	1	2000–2001	41	486	25	76	266	11.9	0.6	1.9	6.5	
Shareef Abdur-Rahim	F	California	5	1996–2001	375	14,237	3,070	1,081	7,801	38.0	8.2	2.9	20.8	
Jordan Adams	G	UCLA	2	2014–2016	32	263	30	19	101	8.2	0.9	0.6	3.2	
Steven Adams	C	Pittsburgh	2	2021–2023	118	3,132	1,245	353	889	26.5	10.6	3.0	7.5	
Santi Aldama^{x}	F	Loyola (MD)	5	2021–2026	278	6,518	1,513	570	2,895	23.4	5.4	2.1	10.4	
Grayson Allen	G	Duke	2	2019–2021	88	1,977	245	160	862	22.5	2.8	1.8	9.8	
Timmy Allen	F	Texas	1	2023–2024	5	125	17	5	13	25.0	3.4	1.0	2.6	
Tony Allen (#9)	G/F	Oklahoma State	7	2010–2017	462	11,588	1,964	629	4,128	25.1	4.3	1.4	8.9	
Ashraf Amaya	F	Southern Illinois	1	1995–1996	54	1,104	303	33	339	20.4	5.6	0.6	6.3	
Chris Andersen	F/C	Blinn	1	2015–2016	20	366	89	9	92	18.3	4.5	0.5	4.6	
Kyle Anderson	F	UCLA	5	2018–2022; 2025–2026	252	6,071	1,314	726	2,148	24.1	5.2	2.9	8.5	
Nick Anderson	G/F	Illinois	1	2001–2002	15	219	33	14	60	14.6	2.2	0.9	4.0	
Greg Anthony	G	UNLV	2	1995–1997	134	3,959	358	883	1,583	29.5	2.7	6.6	11.8	
Robert Archibald	F	Illinois	1	2002–2003	12	72	17	3	19	6.0	1.4	0.3	1.6	
Gilbert Arenas	G	Arizona	1	2011–2012	17	211	18	18	72	12.4	1.1	1.1	4.2	
Darrell Arthur	F	Kansas	4	2008–2011; 2012–2013	247	4,500	967	144	1,656	18.2	3.9	0.6	6.7	
Chucky Atkins	G	South Florida	2	2005–2007	118	3,225	214	475	1,479	27.3	1.8	4.0	12.5	
Isaac Austin	C	Arizona State	2	2000–2002	73	1,152	293	71	302	15.8	4.0	1.0	4.1	
Anthony Avent	F	Seton Hall	1	1995–1996	71	1,586	355	69	415	22.3	5.0	1.0	5.8	
Marvin Bagley III	F/C	Duke	1	2024–2025	12	99	28	4	43	8.3	2.3	0.3	3.6	
Adama Bal^{x}	G	Santa Clara	1	2025–2026	8	241	25	19	83	30.1	3.1	2.4	10.4	
Wade Baldwin IV	G	Vanderbilt	1	2016–2017	33	405	46	61	106	12.3	1.4	1.8	3.2	
Desmond Bane	G	TCU	5	2020–2025	313	9,274	1,438	1,179	5,580	29.6	4.6	3.8	17.8	
Matt Barnes	F	UCLA	1	2015–2016	76	2,190	420	163	758	28.8	5.5	2.1	10.0	
Charles Bassey	C	Western Kentucky	1	2025–2026	2	31	15	2	7	15.5	7.5	1.0	3.5	
Michael Batiste	F	Arizona State	1	2002–2003	75	1,248	257	52	481	16.6	3.4	0.7	6.4	
Shane Battier	F	Duke	6	2001–2006; 2010–2011	419	13,339	2,000	716	4,275	31.8	4.8	1.7	10.2	
Jerryd Bayless	G	Arizona	2	2012–2014	111	2,415	235	330	943	21.8	2.1	3.0	8.5	
Jordan Bell	F	Oregon	1	2019–2020	2	21	3	2	10	10.5	1.5	1.0	5.0	
Troy Bell	G	Boston College	1	2003–2004	6	34	4	4	11	5.7	0.7	0.7	1.8	
Benoit Benjamin	C	Creighton	1	1995–1996	13	404	103	16	181	31.1	7.9	1.2	13.9	
Mike Bibby	G	Arizona	3	1998–2001	214	8,103	746	1,675	3,153	37.9	3.5	7.8	14.7	
Bismack Biyombo	C	(Spain) Fuenlabrada	1	2023–2024	30	718	191	51	156	23.9	6.4	1.7	5.2	
Avery Bradley	G	Texas	1	2018–2019	14	442	44	56	225	31.6	3.1	4.0	16.1	
Ronnie Brewer	G/F	Arkansas	1	2009–2010	5	80	7	3	10	16.0	1.4	0.6	2.0	
Dillon Brooks	G/F	Oregon	6	2017–2023	345	9,888	1,073	735	5,002	28.7	3.1	2.1	14.5	
MarShon Brooks	G/F	Providence	2	2017–2019	36	580	66	50	331	16.1	1.8	1.4	9.2	
Andre Brown	F	DePaul	1	2007–2008	33	286	92	8	100	8.7	2.8	0.2	3.0	
Kwame Brown	F	Glynn Academy (GA)	1	2007–2008	15	204	57	17	52	13.6	3.8	1.1	3.5	
Shaq Buchanan	G	Murray State	1	2021–2022	2	10	2	2	2	5.0	1.0	1.0	1.0	
Greg Buckner	G	Clemson	1	2008–2009	63	878	130	57	155	13.9	2.1	0.9	2.5	
Rodney Buford	G/F	Creighton	1	2001–2002	63	1,769	272	71	591	28.1	4.3	1.1	9.4	
Antonio Burks	G	Memphis	2	2004–2006	81	789	49	104	186	9.7	0.6	1.3	2.3	
Tyler Burton	F	Villanova	1	2025–2026	12	307	50	12	129	25.6	4.2	1.0	10.8	

=== C ===
All-time roster
Player	Pos.	Pre-draft team	Yrs	Seasons	Statistics									Ref.
Player	Pos.	Pre-draft team	Yrs	Seasons	GP	MP	REB	AST	PTS	MPG	RPG	APG	PPG	Ref.
Bruno Caboclo	F	(Brazil) Pinheiros Basquete	2	2018–2020	56	992	202	60	344	17.7	3.6	1.1	6.1	
Nick Calathes	G	Florida	2	2013–2015	129	2,011	243	353	590	15.6	1.9	2.7	4.6	
Kentavious Caldwell-Pope^{x}	G	Georgia	1	2025–2026	51	1,088	125	139	428	21.3	2.5	2.7	8.4	
Brian Cardinal	F	Purdue	4	2004–2008	159	2,588	435	200	897	16.3	2.7	1.3	5.6	
Rodney Carney	F	Memphis	1	2010–2011	2	5	1	0	2	2.5	0.5	0.0	1.0	
Antoine Carr	F/C	Wichita State	1	1999–2000	21	221	32	7	67	10.5	1.5	0.3	3.2	
DeMarre Carroll	F	Missouri	2	2009–2011	78	834	158	35	219	10.7	2.0	0.4	2.8	
Jevon Carter	G	West Virginia	1	2018–2019	39	577	66	69	172	14.8	1.7	1.8	4.4	
Vince Carter^	G/F	North Carolina	3	2014–2017	199	3,895	506	268	1,365	19.6	2.5	1.3	6.9	
Omri Casspi	F	(Israel) Maccabi Tel Aviv	1	2018–2019	36	520	115	26	226	14.4	3.2	0.7	6.3	
Colin Castleton	C	Florida	1	2024–2025	10	46	9	0	14	4.6	0.9	0.0	1.4	
Mario Chalmers	G	Kansas	2	2015–2016; 2017–2018	121	2,674	300	408	1,102	22.1	2.5	3.4	9.1	
Kennedy Chandler	G	Tennessee	1	2022–2023	36	281	38	58	78	7.8	1.1	1.6	2.2	
Pete Chilcutt	F/C	North Carolina	3	1996–1999	182	2,779	579	181	753	15.3	3.2	1.0	4.1	
Brandon Clarke (#15)	F	Gonzaga	7	2019–2026	309	6,412	1,689	410	3,144	20.8	5.5	1.3	10.2	
Walter Clayton Jr.^{x}	G	Florida	1	2025–2026	24	599	51	136	232	25.0	2.1	5.7	9.7	
Jason Collins	C	Stanford	1	2007–2008	31	488	89	6	80	15.7	2.9	0.2	2.6	
Mike Conley	G	Ohio State	12	2007–2019	788	25,700	2,327	4,509	11,733	32.6	3.0	5.7	14.9	
Will Conroy	G	Washington	1	2006–2007	3	17	2	1	0	5.7	0.7	0.3	0.0	
Bryce Cotton	G	Providence	1	2015–2016	5	6	0	0	4	1.2	0.0	0.0	0.8	
Cedric Coward^{x}	G	Washington State	1	2025–2026	62	1,598	364	171	843	25.8	2.8	0.6	13.6	
Javaris Crittenton	G	Georgia Tech	2	2007–2009	35	552	95	38	225	15.8	2.7	1.1	6.4	
Jae Crowder	F	Marquette	1	2019–2020	45	1,322	277	125	447	29.4	6.2	2.8	9.9	
Jarrett Culver	G	Texas Tech	1	2021–2022	37	338	48	33	130	9.1	1.3	0.9	3.5	
Dante Cunningham	F	Villanova	1	2011–2012	64	1,124	246	37	333	17.6	3.8	0.6	5.2	
Seth Curry	G	Duke	1	2013–2014	1	4	0	0	0	4.0	0.0	0.0	0.0	

=== D to E ===
All-time roster
Player	Pos.	Pre-draft team	Yrs	Seasons	Statistics									Ref.
Player	Pos.	Pre-draft team	Yrs	Seasons	GP	MP	REB	AST	PTS	MPG	RPG	APG	PPG	Ref.
Antonio Daniels	G	Bowling Green	1	1997–1998	74	1,956	143	334	579	26.4	1.9	4.5	7.8	
Troy Daniels	G	VCU	1	2016–2017	67	1,183	100	46	551	17.7	1.5	0.7	8.2	
Deyonta Davis	F/C	Michigan State	2	2016–2018	98	1,181	310	42	418	12.1	3.2	0.4	4.3	
Ed Davis	F	North Carolina	2	2012–2014	99	1,500	420	35	542	15.2	4.2	0.4	5.5	
Josh Davis	F	Wyoming	1	2011–2012	15	130	27	6	28	8.7	1.8	0.4	1.9	
Austin Daye	F	Gonzaga	1	2012–2013	31	328	60	21	125	10.6	1.9	0.7	4.0	
Terry Dehere	G	Seton Hall	1	1998–1999	22	271	22	26	74	12.3	1.0	1.2	3.4	
Michael Dickerson	G/F	Arizona	4	1999–2003	162	5,932	526	458	2,710	36.6	3.2	2.8	16.7	
Gorgui Dieng	C	Louisville	2	2019–2021	39	689	196	44	296	17.7	5.0	1.1	7.6	
Keyon Dooling	G	Missouri	1	2012–2013	7	82	1	8	31	11.7	0.1	1.1	4.4	
Tyler Dorsey	G	Oregon	1	2018–2019	21	447	70	39	206	21.3	3.3	1.9	9.8	
Toney Douglas	G	Florida State	1	2016–2017	24	394	61	56	117	16.4	2.5	2.3	4.9	
Zach Edey^{x}	C	Purdue	2	2024–2026	77	1,700	670	77	760	22.1	8.7	1.0	9.9	
Blue Edwards	G/F	East Carolina	3	1995–1998	224	6,180	752	527	2,393	27.6	3.4	2.4	10.7	
Doug Edwards	F	Florida State	1	1995–1996	31	519	87	39	93	16.7	2.8	1.3	3.0	
Kevin Edwards	G	DePaul	1	2000–2001	46	634	82	52	160	13.8	1.8	1.1	3.5	
Obinna Ekezie	F/C	Maryland	1	1999–2000	39	351	92	8	125	9.0	2.4	0.2	3.2	
Wayne Ellington	G	North Carolina	1	2012–2013	40	676	52	42	218	16.9	1.3	1.1	5.5	
Andre Emmett	F	Texas Tech	1	2004–2005	8	28	2	0	7	3.5	0.3	0.0	0.9	
James Ennis III	F	Long Beach State	3	2015–2018	119	2,594	423	115	755	21.8	3.6	1.0	6.3	
Tyreke Evans	G/F	Memphis	1	2017–2018	52	1,607	265	269	1,010	30.9	5.1	5.2	19.4	
Tosan Evbuomwan	F	Princeton	1	2023–2024	4	74	14	6	10	18.5	3.5	1.5	2.5	

=== F to G ===
All-time roster
Player	Pos.	Pre-draft team	Yrs	Seasons	Statistics									Ref.
Player	Pos.	Pre-draft team	Yrs	Seasons	GP	MP	REB	AST	PTS	MPG	RPG	APG	PPG	Ref.
Jordan Farmar	G	UCLA	1	2015–2016	12	291	25	37	110	24.3	2.1	3.1	9.2	
Isaac Fontaine	G	Washington State	1	2001–2002	6	75	5	4	11	12.5	0.8	0.7	1.8	
Antonis Fotsis	F	(Greece) Panathinaikos	1	2001–2002	28	320	62	10	108	11.4	2.2	0.4	3.9	
Adonal Foyle	C	Colgate	1	2008–2009	1	3	0	0	0	3.0	0.0	0.0	0.0	
Jamaal Franklin	G	San Diego State	1	2013–2014	21	161	23	6	39	7.7	1.1	0.3	1.9	
Tim Frazier	G	Penn State	1	2020–2021	5	62	8	16	8	12.4	1.6	3.2	1.6	
Wenyen Gabriel	F/C	Kentucky	1	2023–2024	5	81	25	3	17	16.2	5.0	0.6	3.4	
Marc Gasol (#33)^{+}	C	(Spain) CB Sant Josep	11	2008–2019	769	25,917	5,942	2,639	11,684	33.7	7.7	3.4	15.2	
Pau Gasol^	F/C	(Spain) FC Barcelona	7	2001–2008	476	16,904	4,096	1,473	8,966	35.5	8.6	3.1	18.8	
Kenny Gattison	F/C	Old Dominion	1	1995–1996	25	570	114	14	229	22.8	4.6	0.6	9.2	
Rudy Gay	F	UConn	7	2006–2013	479	17,338	2,758	954	8,562	36.2	5.8	2.0	17.9	
Taj Gibson^{x}	C	USC	1	2025–2026	10	97	27	6	34	9.7	2.7	0.6	3.4	
Trey Gilder	F	Northwestern State	1	2009–2010	2	5	1	0	2	2.5	0.5	0.0	1.0	
Eddie Gill	G	Weber State	1	2001–2002	23	384	28	49	116	16.7	1.2	2.1	5.0	
Jacob Gilyard	G	Richmond	2	2022–2024	38	695	47	138	176	18.3	1.2	3.6	4.6	
Gordan Giriček	G/F	(Croatia) Cibona	1	2002–2003	49	1,187	108	70	548	24.2	2.2	1.4	11.2	
Drew Gooden	F	Kansas	1	2002–2003	51	1,329	295	63	616	26.1	5.8	1.2	12.1	
Jordan Goodwin	G	Saint Louis	1	2023–2024	17	497	136	77	170	29.2	8.0	4.5	10.0	
Danny Green	G	North Carolina	1	2022–2023	3	43	4	2	9	14.3	1.3	0.7	3.0	
JaMychal Green	F	Alabama	5	2014–2019	271	6,128	1,672	270	2,293	22.6	6.2	1.0	8.5	
Jeff Green	F	Georgetown	2	2014–2016	98	2,905	428	179	1,234	29.6	4.4	1.8	12.6	
Marko Gudurić	G	(Turkey) Fenerbahçe	1	2019–2020	44	484	73	45	173	11.0	1.7	1.0	3.9	

=== H ===
All-time roster
Player	Pos.	Pre-draft team	Yrs	Seasons	Statistics									Ref.
Player	Pos.	Pre-draft team	Yrs	Seasons	GP	MP	REB	AST	PTS	MPG	RPG	APG	PPG	Ref.
Hamed Haddadi	C	(Iran) Paykan Tehran	5	2008–2013	134	821	285	35	270	6.1	2.1	0.3	2.0	
P. J. Hairston	G/F	North Carolina	1	2015–2016	18	375	46	9	124	20.8	2.6	0.5	6.9	
PJ Hall	C	Clemson	1	2025–2026	7	27	9	2	13	3.9	1.3	0.3	1.9	
Dusty Hannahs	G	Arkansas	2	2018–2020	4	39	2	5	20	9.8	0.5	1.3	5.0	
Lorinza Harrington	G	Wingate	1	2006–2007	29	543	68	89	152	18.7	2.3	3.1	5.2	
Othella Harrington	F/C	Georgetown	2	1999–2001	126	3,944	852	133	1,556	31.3	6.8	1.1	12.3	
Andrew Harrison	G	Kentucky	3	2016–2019	129	2,805	267	375	960	21.7	2.1	2.9	7.4	
Shaquille Harrison	G	Tulsa	1	2023–2024	3	6	2	0	2	2.0	0.7	0.0	0.7	
Antonio Harvey	F/C	Pfeiffer	1	1995–1996	18	410	94	9	98	22.8	5.2	0.5	5.4	
Taylor Hendricks^{x}	F	UCF	1	2025–2026	26	626	122	31	275	24.1	4.7	1.2	10.6	
Myke Henry	F	DePaul	1	2017–2018	20	378	38	22	107	18.9	1.9	1.1	5.4	
Xavier Henry	G	Kansas	1	2010–2011	38	527	37	18	165	13.9	1.0	0.5	4.3	
Carl Herrera	F	Houston	1	1998–1999	4	42	8	3	6	10.5	2.0	0.8	1.5	
Solomon Hill	F	Arizona	1	2019–2020	48	901	144	94	274	18.8	3.0	2.0	5.7	
Justin Holiday	F	Washington	1	2018–2019	44	1,282	154	61	417	29.1	3.5	1.4	9.5	
Ryan Hollins	C	UCLA	1	2015–2016	32	412	87	10	116	12.9	2.7	0.3	3.6	
Lester Hudson	G	UT Martin	2	2009–2010; 2011–2012	12	81	10	6	45	6.8	0.8	0.5	3.8	
Jay Huff	C	Virginia	1	2024–2025	64	748	129	38	439	11.7	2.0	0.6	6.9	
Ryan Humphrey	F	Notre Dame	3	2002–2005	50	450	120	11	133	9.0	2.4	0.2	2.7	
Steven Hunter	C	DePaul	1	2009–2010	21	158	42	0	53	7.5	2.0	0.0	2.5	
Vince Hunter	F	UTEP	1	2017–2018	4	7	3	0	6	1.8	0.8	0.0	1.5	
Bobby Hurley	G	Duke	1	1997–1998	27	458	30	97	122	17.0	1.1	3.6	4.5	
Matthew Hurt	F	Duke	1	2023–2024	8	113	16	4	32	14.1	2.0	0.5	4.0	

=== I to J ===
All-time roster
Player	Pos.	Pre-draft team	Yrs	Seasons	Statistics									Ref.
Player	Pos.	Pre-draft team	Yrs	Seasons	GP	MP	REB	AST	PTS	MPG	RPG	APG	PPG	Ref.
Allen Iverson^	G	Georgetown	1	2009–2010	3	67	4	11	37	22.3	1.3	3.7	12.3	
Bobby Jackson	G	Minnesota	1	2005–2006	71	1,775	223	195	808	25.0	3.1	2.7	11.4	
GG Jackson^{x}	F	South Carolina	3	2023–2026	132	2,870	523	169	1,594	21.7	4.0	1.3	12.1	
Josh Jackson	G/F	Kansas	1	2019–2020	22	381	66	35	198	17.3	3.0	1.6	9.0	
Jaren Jackson Jr.^{+}	F/C	Michigan State	8	2018–2026	455	13,093	2,530	696	8,449	28.8	5.6	1.5	18.5	
Casey Jacobsen	G/F	Stanford	1	2007–2008	53	547	65	20	107	10.3	1.2	0.4	2.0	
Marko Jarić	G	(Italy) Fortitudo Bologna	1	2008–2009	53	605	65	74	136	11.4	1.2	1.4	2.6	
DeJon Jarreau	G	Houston	2	2023–2024; 2025–2026	20	381	95	62	131	19.1	4.8	3.1	6.6	
DaQuan Jeffries	G	Tulsa	1	2021–2022	3	9	2	1	2	3.0	0.7	0.3	0.7	
Trey Jemison	C	UAB	1	2023–2024	23	572	133	27	171	24.9	5.8	1.2	7.4	
Ty Jerome^{x}	G	Virginia	1	2025–2026	15	339	42	85	295	22.6	2.8	5.7	19.7	
Alexander Johnson	F	Florida State	1	2006–2007	59	753	181	17	260	12.8	3.1	0.3	4.4	
Brice Johnson	F	North Carolina	1	2017–2018	9	60	18	1	27	6.7	2.0	0.1	3.0	
Chris Johnson	G/F	Dayton	1	2012–2013	8	102	11	2	29	12.8	1.4	0.3	3.6	
James Johnson	F	Wake Forest	1	2013–2014	52	956	166	111	384	18.4	3.2	2.1	7.4	
Omari Johnson	F	Oregon State	1	2017–2018	4	75	11	7	22	18.8	2.8	1.8	5.5	
Bobby Jones	F	Washington	1	2007–2008	9	137	27	11	40	15.2	3.0	1.2	4.4	
Dahntay Jones	G/F	Duke	4	2003–2007	221	3,441	349	140	1,133	15.6	1.6	0.6	5.1	
Damon Jones	G	Houston	1	2000–2001	71	1,415	124	224	461	19.9	1.7	3.2	6.5	
Eddie Jones	G/F	Temple	2	2005–2007	104	2,998	340	210	1,046	28.8	3.3	2.0	10.1	
Tyus Jones	G	Duke	4	2019–2023	288	5,943	619	1,285	2,381	20.6	2.1	4.5	8.3	

=== K to M ===
All-time roster
Player	Pos.	Pre-draft team	Yrs	Seasons	Statistics									Ref.
Player	Pos.	Pre-draft team	Yrs	Seasons	GP	MP	REB	AST	PTS	MPG	RPG	APG	PPG	Ref.
Yuki Kawamura	G	(Japan) Yokohama B-Corsairs	1	2024–2025	22	93	12	19	36	4.2	0.5	0.9	1.6	
Luke Kennard	G	Duke	3	2022–2025	128	3,061	371	405	1,277	23.9	2.9	3.2	10.0	
Chris King	F	Wake Forest	1	1995–1996	80	1,930	285	104	634	24.1	3.6	1.3	7.9	
Tarence Kinsey	G	South Carolina	2	2006–2008	59	1,063	109	43	409	18.0	1.8	0.7	6.9	
Brevin Knight	G	Stanford	2	2001–2003	108	2,079	190	535	587	19.3	1.8	5.0	5.4	
Christian Koloko	C	Arizona	1	2025–2026	11	195	44	10	29	17.7	4.0	0.9	2.6	
John Konchar	G/F	Purdue Fort Wayne	7	2019–2026	337	5,708	1,314	470	1,393	16.9	3.9	1.4	4.1	
Kosta Koufos	C	Ohio State	2	2013–2015	161	2,697	844	76	933	16.8	5.2	0.5	5.8	
Jock Landale	C	Saint Mary's	1	2025–2026	45	1,060	292	75	509	23.6	6.5	1.7	11.3	
Jake LaRavia	F	Wake Forest	3	2022–2025	117	2,202	396	212	827	18.8	3.4	1.8	7.1	
Acie Law	G	Texas A&M	1	2010–2011	11	94	11	14	12	8.5	1.0	1.3	1.1	
Eric Leckner	F/C	Wyoming	1	1996–1997	19	115	35	4	34	6.1	1.8	0.2	1.8	
Courtney Lee	G	Western Kentucky	3	2013–2016	177	5,312	434	310	1,828	30.0	2.5	1.8	10.3	
Jon Leuer	F	Wisconsin	3	2012–2015	131	1,562	389	69	622	11.9	3.0	0.5	4.7	
Kenneth Lofton Jr.	F	Louisiana Tech	2	2022–2024	39	275	66	34	159	7.1	1.7	0.9	4.1	
Grant Long	F	Eastern Michigan	3	1999–2002	174	4,295	739	262	1,016	24.7	4.2	1.5	5.8	
Felipe López	G	St. John's	2	1998–2000	112	1,999	290	106	729	17.8	2.6	0.9	6.5	
Lawson Lovering	C	Utah	1	2025–2026	2	49	15	3	14	24.5	7.5	1.5	7.0	
Kyle Lowry	G	Villanova	3	2006–2009	141	3,335	392	506	1,217	23.7	2.8	3.6	8.6	
Kalin Lucas	G	Michigan State	1	2014–2015	1	6	0	0	0	6.0	0.0	0.0	0.0	
George Lynch	F	North Carolina	2	1996–1998	123	2,552	623	198	958	20.7	5.1	1.6	7.8	
Sam Mack	G/F	Houston	2	1997–1999	76	1,991	186	124	858	26.2	2.4	1.6	11.3	
Shelvin Mack	G	Butler	1	2018–2019	53	1,204	102	182	421	22.7	1.9	3.4	7.9	
Rich Manning	C	Washington	2	1995–1997	45	439	78	9	151	9.8	1.7	0.2	3.4	
Cuonzo Martin	G/F	Purdue	1	1995–1996	4	19	2	2	9	4.8	0.5	0.5	2.3	
Darrick Martin	G	UCLA	1	1995–1996	24	402	38	61	161	16.8	1.6	2.5	6.7	
Jarell Martin	F	LSU	3	2015–2018	142	2,599	566	96	883	18.3	4.0	0.7	6.2	
Jahmai Mashack^{x}	G	Tennessee	1	2025–2026	31	673	81	69	192	21.7	2.6	2.2	6.2	
Tony Massenburg	F	Maryland	4	1997–1999; 2001–2002	229	4,107	1,023	79	1,513	17.9	4.5	0.3	6.6	
Dakota Mathias	G	Purdue	1	2021–2022	6	16	2	1	6	2.7	0.3	0.2	1.0	
Lee Mayberry	G	Arkansas	3	1996–1999	168	3,913	251	701	793	23.3	1.5	4.2	4.7	
O. J. Mayo	G	USC	4	2008–2012	301	9,873	999	818	4,584	32.8	3.3	2.7	15.2	
Ray McCallum Jr.	G	Detroit Mercy	1	2015–2016	10	219	16	27	69	21.9	1.6	2.7	6.9	
Sean McDermott	F	Butler	1	2020–2021	18	158	19	4	39	8.8	1.1	0.2	2.2	
Ben McLemore	G	Kansas	1	2017–2018	56	1,091	139	51	422	19.5	2.5	0.9	7.5	
De'Anthony Melton	G	USC	3	2019–2022	185	3,869	709	501	1,718	20.9	3.8	2.7	9.3	
Sam Merrill	G	Utah State	1	2021–2022	6	58	7	4	25	9.7	1.2	0.7	4.2	
C. J. Miles	G/F	Skyline HS (TX)	1	2018–2019	13	294	27	14	121	22.6	2.1	1.1	9.3	
Darius Miles	F	East St. Louis HS (IL)	1	2008–2009	34	298	57	17	120	8.8	1.7	0.5	3.5	
Darko Miličić	F/C	(Serbia) Vršac	2	2007–2009	131	2,697	688	92	838	20.6	5.3	0.7	6.4	
Mike Miller	G/F	Florida	7	2002–2008; 2013–2014	453	13,597	2,020	1,351	5,982	30.0	4.5	3.0	13.2	
Eric Mobley	C	Pittsburgh	2	1995–1997	62	918	186	36	254	14.8	3.0	0.6	4.1	
Ja Morant*	G	Murray State	7	2019–2026	327	10,370	1,513	2,428	7,331	31.7	4.6	7.4	22.4	
Darius Morris	G	Michigan	1	2013–2014	5	66	8	8	15	13.2	1.6	1.6	3.0	
Lawrence Moten	G	Syracuse	2	1995–1997	111	1,787	180	179	738	16.1	1.6	1.6	6.6	
Xavier Munford	G	Rhode Island	1	2015–2016	14	244	31	22	80	17.4	2.2	1.6	5.7	
Eric Murdock	G	Providence	1	1995–1996	64	1,480	155	292	585	23.1	2.4	4.6	9.1	

=== N to P ===
All-time roster
Player	Pos.	Pre-draft team	Yrs	Seasons	Statistics									Ref.
Player	Pos.	Pre-draft team	Yrs	Seasons	GP	MP	REB	AST	PTS	MPG	RPG	APG	PPG	Ref.
Juan Carlos Navarro	G	(Spain) FC Barcelona	1	2007–2008	82	2,117	210	177	896	25.8	2.6	2.2	10.9	
Makhtar N'Diaye	F	North Carolina	1	1998–1999	4	27	5	1	5	6.8	1.3	0.3	1.3	
Ivano Newbill	F	Georgia Tech	1	1997–1998	28	249	69	9	58	8.9	2.5	0.3	2.1	
Joakim Noah	C	Florida	1	2018–2019	42	693	238	89	298	16.5	5.7	2.1	7.1	
Moochie Norris	G	West Florida	1	1996–1997	8	89	12	23	12	11.1	1.5	2.9	1.5	
Jaylen Nowell	G	Washington	1	2023–2024	9	156	14	16	51	17.3	1.6	1.8	5.7	
Toby Okani^{x}	G	West Virginia	1	2025–2026	6	217	21	6	60	36.2	3.5	1.0	10.0	
Bo Outlaw	F	Houston	1	2003–2004	82	1,606	342	90	379	19.6	4.2	1.1	4.6	
Chris Owens	F	Texas	1	2002–2003	1	6	1	0	4	6.0	1.0	0.0	4.0	
Scott Padgett	F	Kentucky	1	2006–2007	7	33	9	0	2	4.7	1.3	0.0	0.3	
Milt Palacio	G	Colorado State	1	1999–2000	53	394	51	48	108	7.4	1.0	0.9	2.0	
Jeremy Pargo	G	Gonzaga	1	2011–2012	44	424	37	55	126	9.6	0.8	1.3	2.9	
Cherokee Parks	F/C	Duke	2	1998–2000	104	1,926	426	71	434	18.5	4.1	0.7	4.2	
Chandler Parsons	F	Florida	3	2016–2019	95	1,862	244	167	681	19.6	2.6	1.8	7.2	
Anthony Peeler	G	Missouri	2	1996–1998	80	2,493	267	279	1,120	31.2	3.3	3.5	14.0	
Mãozinha Pereira	F	(Mexico) Capitanes de la Ciudad de México	1	2023–2024	7	122	37	2	48	17.4	5.3	0.3	6.9	
Elliot Perry	G	Memphis	1	2001–2002	2	48	4	7	11	24.0	2.0	3.5	5.5	
Wesley Person	G	Auburn	2	2002–2004	82	2,225	210	135	810	27.1	2.6	1.6	9.9	
Scotty Pippen Jr.^{x}	G	Vanderbilt	3	2023–2026	110	2,422	348	492	1,164	22.0	3.2	4.5	10.6	
Dexter Pittman	C	Texas	1	2012–2013	7	20	5	0	2	2.9	0.7	0.0	0.3	
Quincy Pondexter	G/F	Washington	4	2011–2015	168	3,055	341	136	874	18.2	2.0	0.8	5.2	
Yves Pons	F	Tennessee	1	2021–2022	12	71	12	1	13	5.9	1.0	0.1	1.1	
Jontay Porter	F	Missouri	1	2020–2021	11	54	14	1	22	4.9	1.3	0.1	2.0	
James Posey	G/F	Xavier	2	2003–2005	132	3,833	622	210	1,531	29.0	4.7	1.6	11.6	
Leon Powe	F	California	1	2010–2011	16	141	25	5	88	8.8	1.6	0.3	5.5	
Brent Price	G	Oklahoma	2	1999–2001	47	454	41	74	154	9.7	0.9	1.6	3.3	
Tayshaun Prince	F	Kentucky	3	2012–2015	139	3,750	472	241	969	27.0	3.4	1.7	7.0	
Olivier-Maxence Prosper^{x}	F	Marquette	1	2025–2026	53	984	187	51	530	18.6	3.5	1.0	10.0	
Zyon Pullin	G	Florida	1	2024–2025	3	3	0	0	0	1.0	0.0	0.0	0.0	

=== R to S ===
All-time roster
Player	Pos.	Pre-draft team	Yrs	Seasons	Statistics									Ref.
Player	Pos.	Pre-draft team	Yrs	Seasons	GP	MP	REB	AST	PTS	MPG	RPG	APG	PPG	Ref.
Ivan Rabb	F	California	2	2017–2019	85	1,237	364	86	485	14.6	4.3	1.0	5.7	
Zach Randolph (#50)^{+}	F/C	Michigan State	8	2009–2017	551	17,928	5,612	1,085	9,261	32.5	10.2	2.0	16.8	
Xavier Rathan-Mayes	G	Florida State	1	2017–2018	5	118	5	18	29	23.6	1.0	3.6	5.8	
Bryant Reeves	C	Oklahoma State	6	1995–2001	395	12,071	2,745	623	4,945	30.6	6.9	1.6	12.5	
Rodrick Rhodes	G/F	USC	1	1998–1999	10	123	13	10	34	12.3	1.3	1.0	3.4	
Jeremy Richardson	G/F	Delta State	1	2007–2008	3	15	1	1	0	5.0	0.3	0.3	0.0	
Anthony Roberson	G	Florida	1	2005–2006	16	88	6	5	35	5.5	0.4	0.3	2.2	
Lawrence Roberts	F	Mississippi State	2	2005–2007	87	1,150	310	35	334	13.2	3.6	0.4	3.8	
Chris Robinson	G	Western Kentucky	2	1996–1998	57	824	84	75	242	14.5	1.5	1.3	4.2	
Larry Robinson	G/F	Centenary	1	1997–1998	6	41	12	1	17	6.8	2.0	0.2	2.8	
David Roddy	F	Colorado State	2	2022–2024	118	2,372	393	135	869	20.1	3.3	1.1	7.4	
Roy Rogers	F	Alabama	1	1996–1997	82	1,848	386	46	543	22.5	4.7	0.6	6.6	
Derrick Rose	G	Memphis	1	2023–2024	24	399	45	78	191	16.6	1.9	3.3	8.0	
Quinton Ross	G	SMU	1	2008–2009	68	1,164	126	47	265	17.1	1.9	0.7	3.9	
Rayan Rupert^{x}	G	New Zealand Breakers	1	2025–2026	16	495	102	34	195	30.9	6.4	2.1	12.2	
J. R. Sakuragi	F	UCLA	1	1998–1999	30	331	47	22	97	11.0	1.6	0.7	3.2	
Jason Sasser	F	Texas Tech	1	1998–1999	6	39	7	2	11	6.5	1.2	0.3	1.8	
Byron Scott	G	Arizona State	1	1995–1996	80	1,894	192	123	819	23.7	2.4	1.5	10.2	
Dennis Scott	F	Georgia Tech	1	1999–2000	66	1,263	106	69	369	19.1	1.6	1.0	5.6	
Josh Selby	G	Kansas	2	2011–2013	38	296	20	34	83	7.8	0.5	0.9	2.2	
Wayne Selden Jr.	G/F	Kansas	3	2016–2019	78	1,336	111	114	552	17.1	1.4	1.5	7.1	
Kobi Simmons	G	Arizona	1	2017–2018	32	643	50	68	196	20.1	1.6	2.1	6.1	
Zavier Simpson	G	Michigan	1	2023–2024	7	161	20	25	42	23.0	2.9	3.6	6.0	
Brian Skinner	F	Baylor	1	2011–2012	1	4	0	0	0	4.0	0.0	0.0	0.0	
Javon Small^{x}	G	West Virginia	1	2025–2026	41	830	128	151	396	20.2	3.1	3.7	9.7	
Marcus Smart	G	Oklahoma State	2	2023–2025	39	1,005	96	157	454	25.8	2.5	4.0	11.6	
Ish Smith	G	Wake Forest	1	2010–2011	15	113	5	15	27	7.5	0.3	1.0	1.8	
Michael Smith	F	Providence	2	1997–1999	78	1,804	556	107	412	23.1	7.1	1.4	5.3	
Russ Smith	G	Louisville	2	2014–2016	21	102	12	17	48	4.9	0.6	0.8	2.3	
Theron Smith	F	Ball State	1	2003–2004	20	178	41	7	44	8.9	2.1	0.4	2.2	
Xavier Sneed	F	Kansas State	1	2021–2022	2	8	2	0	0	4.0	1.0	0.0	0.0	
Will Solomon	G	Clemson	1	2001–2002	62	872	68	92	321	14.1	1.1	1.5	5.2	
Marreese Speights	F/C	Florida	2	2011–2013	100	1,924	563	66	788	19.2	5.6	0.7	7.9	
Cam Spencer^{x}	G	UConn	2	2024–2026	97	1,966	213	434	904	20.3	2.2	4.5	9.3	
D. J. Stephens	G/F	Memphis	1	2018–2019	1	7	0	0	2	7.0	0.0	0.0	2.0	
Joe Stephens	F	Little Rock	1	1999–2000	13	181	36	11	41	13.9	2.8	0.8	3.2	
Lance Stephenson	G/F	Cincinnati	1	2015–2016	26	692	115	73	369	26.6	4.4	2.8	14.2	
Alex Stepheson	F	USC	1	2015–2016	4	61	26	2	20	15.3	6.5	0.5	5.0	
Lamar Stevens	F	Penn State	2	2023–2025	36	592	134	28	293	16.4	3.7	0.8	8.1	
Jarnell Stokes	F/C	Tennessee	2	2014–2016	21	130	36	4	57	6.2	1.7	0.2	2.7	
Damon Stoudamire	G	Arizona	3	2005–2008	118	2,987	305	539	995	25.3	2.6	4.6	8.4	
Erick Strickland	G	Nebraska	1	2000–2001	22	409	76	66	140	18.6	3.5	3.0	6.4	
Stromile Swift	F	LSU	7	2000–2005; 2007–2008	441	8,980	2,128	243	3,829	20.4	4.8	0.6	8.7	

=== T to Z ===
All-time roster
Player	Pos.	Pre-draft team	Yrs	Seasons	Statistics									Ref.
Player	Pos.	Pre-draft team	Yrs	Seasons	GP	MP	REB	AST	PTS	MPG	RPG	APG	PPG	Ref.
Marquis Teague	G	Kentucky	1	2017–2018	3	74	6	13	11	24.7	2.0	4.3	3.7	
Garrett Temple	G	LSU	1	2018–2019	49	1,530	152	69	463	31.2	3.1	1.4	9.4	
Tyrell Terry	G	Stanford	1	2021–2022	2	3	0	0	2	1.5	0.0	0.0	1.0	
Jon Teske	C	Michigan	1	2021–2022	3	8	2	1	0	2.7	0.7	0.3	0.0	
Hasheem Thabeet	C	UConn	2	2009–2011	113	1,252	318	15	261	11.1	2.8	0.1	2.3	
John Thomas	F	Minnesota	1	2005–2006	3	25	0	1	4	8.3	0.0	0.3	1.3	
Tyrus Thomas	F	LSU	1	2014–2015	2	7	0	1	4	3.5	0.0	0.5	2.0	
Otis Thorpe	F/C	Providence	1	1997–1998	47	1,574	371	161	528	33.5	7.9	3.4	11.2	
Killian Tillie	C	Gonzaga	2	2020–2022	54	643	84	30	175	11.9	1.6	0.6	3.2	
Xavier Tillman Sr.	F/C	Michigan State	4	2020–2024	207	3,666	881	290	1,275	17.7	4.3	1.4	6.2	
Jamaal Tinsley	G	Iowa State	1	2009–2010	38	589	66	108	133	15.5	1.7	2.8	3.5	
Anthony Tolliver	F	Creighton	1	2019–2020	13	236	33	10	62	18.2	2.5	0.8	4.8	
Cezary Trybański	C	(Poland) Znicz Pruszków	1	2002–2003	15	86	14	1	14	5.7	0.9	0.1	0.9	
Jake Tsakalidis	C	(Greece) AEK Athens	4	2003–2007	145	1,801	460	43	559	12.4	3.2	0.3	3.9	
Beno Udrih	G	(Italy) Olimpia Milano	3	2013–2016	97	1,669	154	252	679	17.2	1.6	2.6	7.0	
Jarrod Uthoff	F	Iowa	1	2019–2020	4	14	1	0	4	3.5	0.3	0.0	1.0	
Jonas Valančiūnas	C	(Lithuania) Rytas	3	2018–2021	151	4,127	1,767	284	2,481	27.3	11.7	1.9	16.4	
Greivis Vásquez	G	Maryland	1	2010–2011	70	860	73	151	249	12.3	1.0	2.2	3.6	
Hakim Warrick	F	Syracuse	4	2005–2009	307	6,659	1,326	224	3,126	21.7	4.3	0.7	10.2	
Julian Washburn	F	UTEP	1	2018–2019	18	254	41	14	40	14.1	2.3	0.8	2.2	
Yuta Watanabe	F	George Washington	3	2018–2020; 2023–2024	38	361	60	18	88	9.5	1.6	0.5	2.3	
Earl Watson	G	UCLA	3	2002–2005	240	4,843	506	986	1,508	20.2	2.1	4.1	6.3	
Brianté Weber	G	VCU	2	2015–2016; 2017–2018	11	285	41	29	53	25.9	3.7	2.6	4.8	
Bonzi Wells	G/F	Ball State	2	2003–2005	128	2,957	428	184	1,449	23.1	3.3	1.4	11.3	
Jaylen Wells^{x}	G/F	Washington State	2	2024–2026	148	3,864	488	246	1,688	26.1	3.3	1.7	11.4	
Doug West	G/F	Villanova	3	1998–2001	67	1,046	111	76	261	15.6	1.7	1.1	3.9	
DeJuan Wheat	G	Louisville	1	1998–1999	46	590	45	102	208	12.8	1.0	2.2	4.5	
Jack White	F	Duke	1	2023–2024	4	64	12	1	6	16.0	3.0	0.3	1.5	
Dariq Whitehead^{x}	F	Duke	1	2025–2026	6	183	24	9	98	20.5	4.0	1.5	16.3	
Gerald Wilkins	G/F	Chattanooga	1	1995–1996	28	738	65	68	188	26.4	2.3	2.4	6.7	
Aaron Williams	F/C	Xavier	1	1996–1997	32	553	138	15	197	17.3	4.3	0.5	6.2	
Elliot Williams	G	Memphis	1	2015–2016	5	45	4	4	8	9.0	0.8	0.8	1.6	
Jason Williams	G	Florida	5	2001–2005; 2010–2011	295	8,834	684	2,069	3,400	29.9	2.3	7.0	11.5	
Marcus Williams	G	UConn	1	2009–2010	62	872	93	161	269	14.1	1.5	2.6	4.3	
Troy Williams	F	Indiana	1	2016–2017	24	418	45	19	127	17.4	1.9	0.8	5.3	
Ziaire Williams	F	Stanford	3	2021–2024	150	2,945	388	175	1,131	19.6	2.6	1.2	7.5	
Vince Williams Jr.	G	VCU	4	2022–2026	128	2,776	539	384	1,002	21.7	4.2	3.0	7.8	
Lucas Williamson^{x}	G	Loyola Chicago	1	2025–2026	7	224	38	18	73	32.0	5.4	2.6	10.4	
Justise Winslow	F	Duke	1	2020–2021	26	507	118	50	178	19.5	4.5	1.9	6.8	
Brandan Wright	F/C	North Carolina	3	2015–2018	67	1,025	214	34	407	15.3	3.2	0.5	6.1	
Delon Wright	G	Utah	1	2018–2019	26	802	141	138	316	30.8	5.4	5.3	12.2	
Lorenzen Wright	F/C	Memphis	5	2001–2006	336	8,883	2,386	330	3,148	26.4	7.1	1.0	9.4	
Tony Wroten	G	Washington	1	2012–2013	35	272	28	43	91	7.8	0.8	1.2	2.6	
Sam Young	F	Pittsburgh	3	2009–2012	179	3,138	429	132	1,241	17.5	2.4	0.7	6.9	
Tyler Zeller	F/C	North Carolina	1	2018–2019	4	82	18	3	46	20.5	4.5	0.8	11.5	
