= Lew Wallace High School =

Public high school in Gary, Indiana, US

Coordinates: 41°32′9.1″N 87°20′32.1″W

- Lew Wallace High School crest

Location
- 415 W. 45th Ave. Gary, Indiana; United States

Information
- Type: Public
- Established: 1926
- Closed: 2014
- Principal: Lucille Upshaw
- Faculty: 105 (approximate)
- Enrollment: 1000 (approximate)
- Colors: Black & Gold
- Team name: Hornets

Lew Wallace High School was a four-year (9–12) public high school of the Gary Community School Corporation in Gary, Indiana, United States.

== Staff ==
The faculty included nearly 65 teachers.

== History ==
In 1926 the 45th Avenue School of Gary, Indiana was officially named Lew Wallace High School named after Lew Wallace. Wallace was a native to Indiana who served as a United States General during the American Civil War, as the Governor of the New Mexico Territory, the Ambassador to the Ottoman Empire, and as the author of Ben Hur. The "A and B wings" of Lew Wallace were constructed in 1933. The campus was renovated as recently as 1972, an addition that included the Richard Polk Gymnasium.

During a period of time, the school served K-12 students. The school offered community recreation programs on weekends.

As of 2014, the school was formally known as Lew Wallace Science Technology Engineering Mathematics (STEM) Academy.

Athletic programs included baseball, basketball, football, and track.

On Tuesday, June 3, 2014, the Gary School Board voted 4–2 to close Lew Wallace, along with 5 other schools. The building was reported to need $2.8 million of repairs. As of 2015, one year after closure, the building was reported to be in worsening condition. Between November 2021 and April 2022, the school was demolished.

== Notable alumni ==
- Stacy Adams, former football coach at Valparaiso University
- Les Bingaman, All-Pro NFL football player with the Detroit Lions
- Walt Bogdanich, investigative journalist and three-time recipient of the Pulitzer Prize
- Vic Bubas, former basketball coach at Duke University
- John Bushemi, war photographer
- David A. Capp, former U.S. Attorney
- Joe Capua, All-American basketball player at Wyoming
- Branden Dawson, class of 2011, Michigan State University alumni and NBA player
- Tellis Frank, NBA basketball player
- Milo Komenich, NBA basketball player
- Jerome A. Prince, 21st mayor of Gary, Indiana
- Jerry Shay, Purdue University Hall of Fame and All-American football player, NFL Defensive Tackle and current scout
- Hank Stram, AFL/NFL Head Coach and Super Bowl Champion
