= Josh Adams (basketball) =

American basketball player (born 1993)

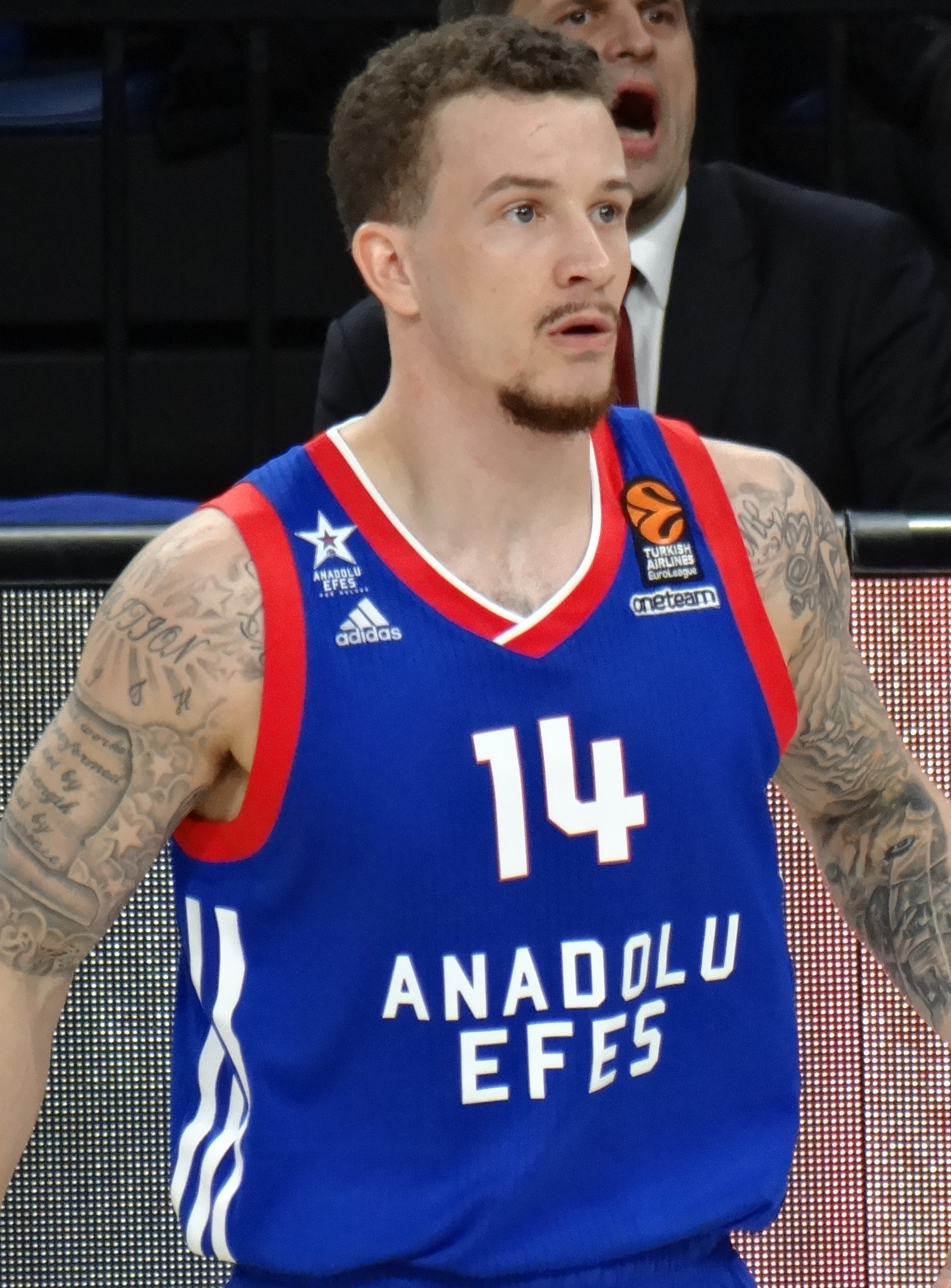
- Adams with Anadolu Efes in 2017

Personal information
- Born: November 16, 1993 (age 32)
- Listed height: 6 ft 2 in (188 cm)
- Listed weight: 190 lb (86 kg)

Career information
- High school: Chaparral (Parker, Colorado)
- College: Wyoming (2012–2016)
- NBA draft: 2016: undrafted
- Playing career: 2016–2025
- Position: Point guard / shooting guard
- Number: 14

Career history
- 2016–2017: Avtodor Saratov
- 2017–2018: Anadolu Efes
- 2018: Beşiktaş
- 2018: Shanxi Brave Dragons
- 2019: Raptors 905
- 2019–2020: Málaga
- 2020–2021: Virtus Bologna
- 2021–2022: Tasmania JackJumpers
- 2022–2023: Cedevita Olimpija
- 2024: Promitheas Patras
- 2024: Maroussi
- 2025: Brisbane Bullets

Career highlights
- Slovenian League champion (2023); Slovenian Cup winner (2023); Italian League champion (2021); All-NBL Second Team (2022); ACB Most Spectacular Player (2020); AP Honorable Mention All-American (2016); First-team All-MWC (2016); Third-team All-MWC (2015)

Joshua Taylor Adams (born November 16, 1993) is an American former professional basketball player. He played college basketball for the Wyoming Cowboys before playing professionally in Russia, Turkey, China, the NBA G League, Spain, Italy, Australia, Slovenia and Greece.

== Early life ==
Adams is a native of Phoenix, Arizona. He attended Chaparral High School in Parker, Colorado, where he averaged 5.8 points, 2.7 rebounds and 1.2 assists per game as a sophomore in 2009–10.

As a junior at Chaparral in 2010–11, Adams was named First-Team All-Conference and earned Second-Team All-State honors after averaging 16.1 points, 4.4 rebounds and 2.6 assists per game.

As a senior in 2011–12, Adams led the Wolverines to a 5A state championship, including making the game-winning shot in the title game. He averaged 18.0 points, 3.7 rebounds, 1.9 assists and 1.5 steals per game to earn First-Team All-Conference and All-State honors. He was also named to the Denver Post's All-Colorado team.

== College career ==
Adams played four seasons of college basketball for the Wyoming Cowboys between 2012 and 2016.

As a freshman in 2012–13, Adams began the season as the sixth man and then started the last 26 games. He scored in double figures in 10 games, including three of the last four contests to average 6.6 points, 1.4 rebounds and 1.6 assists per game. He scored a season-high 15 points in his first career start against Illinois State on December 4, 2012.

As a sophomore in 2013–14, Adams started 32 games for the Cowboys and averaged 12.7 points, 3.1 rebounds and 2.9 assists in 32.4 minutes per game. He scored a season-high 29 points against Boise State on March 1, 2014. He later had 24 points, seven rebounds, three assists and two blocks against UNLV on March 13.

As a junior in 2014–15, Adams helped the Cowboys win the Mountain West Conference tournament title for its first NCAA tournament berth since 2001–02. He was the conference tournament's MVP and earned all-tournament honors after being named to the All-Mountain West Third Team during the regular season. He played in all 35 games and averaged 12.8 points, 3.6 assists, 3.3 rebounds and 1.4 steals per game. He scored in double figures in 26 games, including seven contests with more than 20 points, and became the 34th Cowboy to reach 1,000 career points. He scored a season-high 27 points against Boise State in the Mountain West tournament semifinals on March 13, 2015.

As a senior in 2015–16, Adams averaged 24.7 points, 5.5 rebounds, 4.2 assists and 1.5 steals in 36.9 minutes per game. His 24.7 points per game led the Mountain West and ranked third in the NCAA, as he scored 30 or more in nine games, 20 or more in 21 games and reached double figures in all 30 games he played in. His 96 3-pointers ranked second in UW single-season history. He had 37 points and a career-high 10 rebounds in 38 minutes against Marshall on December 21, 2015, and scored a career-high 38 points against New Mexico on January 16, 2016. He was subsequently named Mountain West Player of the Year and earned first-team All-Mountain West. He also earned AP Honorable Mention All-American for the 2015–16 season, becoming the first Cowboy to be named an All-American since 2002. His 740 points in 2015–16 broke Flynn Robinson's school record of 701 during the 1964–65 season.

Adams finished his career fifth in Wyoming history with 1,819 career points, as well as sixth in assists (398) and fifth in steals (144). His 189 career 3-pointers also ranked second in school history, while his 122 games started were third and his 131 games played tied for first with Eric Leckner.

In September 2026, Adams was inducted into the UW Collegiate Athletics Hall of Fame.

== Professional career ==
After going undrafted in the 2016 NBA draft, Adams joined the Denver Nuggets for the 2016 NBA Summer League. On July 30, 2016, he signed with Russian club Avtodor Saratov of the VTB United League. He was unable to debut for Avtodor until January 2017 after being in a car accident in August 2016.

Adams played for the Dallas Mavericks at the 2017 NBA Summer League. On July 12, 2017, he signed with Turkish club Anadolu Efes for the 2017–18 season. On January 5, 2018, he left Efes and signed with Beşiktaş for the rest of the season.

On August 14, 2018, Adams signed a one-year deal with the Shanxi Brave Dragons of the Chinese Basketball Association. On November 4, 2018, he scored 34 points in a 101–88 loss to the Shanghai Sharks. In 15 games for Shanxi, he averaged 26.4 points, 5.4 rebounds and 4.8 assists per game.

On January 20, 2019, Adams was acquired by Raptors 905 of the NBA G League for the rest of the 2018–19 season.

On July 19, 2019, Adams signed a one-year deal with Spanish club Unicaja. He was named the ACB Most Spectacular Player for the 2019–20 season. He averaged 12.9 points, 2.2 rebounds and 2.2 assists per game in ACB play.

On July 20, 2020, Adams signed with Virtus Bologna of the Lega Basket Serie A. He parted ways with the team on July 9, 2021.

On July 20, 2021, Adams signed with the Tasmania JackJumpers of the Australian National Basketball League (NBL) for the 2021–22 season. He averaged 17 points per game for the season and helped the JackJumpers reach the NBL Grand Final series in their first season.

On July 30, 2022, Adams signed with Cedevita Olimpija of the Slovenian League. In 29 games in the Adriatic League in 2022–23, he averaged 14.1 points, 3.5 rebounds, 3.0 assists and 1.0 steals per game. He also averaged 13.9 points, 3.5 rebounds and 3.3 assists in 18 Eurocup games.

In August 2024, Adams signed with Greek club Promitheas. He appeared in one game for Promitheas before joining Maroussi in mid October. He left Maroussi in late November.

On January 2, 2025, Adams signed with the Brisbane Bullets for the rest of the 2024–25 NBL season as an injury replacement for James Batemon III.

== Coaching career ==
In the 2025–26 season, Adams served as interim head coach of Lutheran High School in Parker, Colorado, leading the school to the state championship. He became the full-time head coach for the 2026–27 season.

== Personal life ==
Adams is the son of Phillip and Stephanie Adams. He has a younger sister, Jaylen, and an older brother, Jordan, who played at Western State.

== Career statistics ==
Legend
GP	Games played	GS	Games started	MPG	Minutes per game
FG%	Field-goal percentage	3P%	3-point field-goal percentage	FT%	Free-throw percentage
RPG	Rebounds per game	APG	Assists per game	SPG	Steals per game
BPG	Blocks per game	PPG	Points per game	PIR	Performance index rating
**Bold**	Career high

=== NBA G League ===
Year	Team	GP	GS	MPG	FG%	3P%	FT%	RPG	APG	SPG	BPG	PPG
2018–19	Raptors 905	20	11	29.9	.404	.364	.758	4.3	4.4	1.1	.6	15.6
Career		20	11	29.9	.404	.364	.758	4.3	4.4	1.1	.6	15.6

=== EuroLeague ===
Year	Team	GP	GS	MPG	FG%	3P%	FT%	RPG	APG	SPG	BPG	PPG	PIR
2017–18	Anadolu Efes	16	8	16.8	.568	.385	.833	1.6	2.0	.4	.1	7.0	6.6
Career		16	8	16.8	.568	.385	.833	1.6	2.0	.4	.1	7.0	6.6

=== Domestic Leagues ===
Year	Team	League	GP	MPG	FG%	3P%	FT%	RPG	APG	SPG	BPG	PPG
2016–17	(Russia) Avtodor Saratov	VTB	13	27.4	.476	.344	.739	2.2	4.2	1.5	.2	12.1
2017–18	(Turkey) Anadolu Efes	BSL	6	23.6	.474	.263	.862	3.7	2.3	.2	.7	11.0
2017–18	(Turkey) Beşiktaş	BSL	18	30.0	.526	.388	.815	3.0	4.2	.4	.2	14.1
2018–19	(China) Shanxi Brave Dragons	CBA	15	37.5	.454	.333	.815	5.4	4.8	1.4	.8	26.4
2019–20	(Spain) Unicaja	ACB	27	23.1	.397	.366	.800	2.2	2.2	.5	.4	12.2
2020–21	(Italy) Virtus Bologna	LBA	32	15.8	.378	.327	.870	1.5	1.3	.7	.2	6.2
2021–22	(Australia) Tasmania JackJumpers	NBL	34	27.7	.410	.339	.789	3.4	2.0	1.0	0.2	17.5

=== College ===
Year	Team	GP	GS	MPG	FG%	3P%	FT%	RPG	APG	SPG	BPG	PPG
2012–13	Wyoming	34	26	28.9	.346	.226	.637	1.4	1.6	.8	.2	6.6
2013–14	Wyoming	32	32	32.4	**.483**	.313	.734	3.1	2.9	.8	.3	12.7
2014–15	Wyoming	**35**	**34**	33.6	.437	.324	.743	3.3	3.6	1.4	.2	12.8
2015–16	Wyoming	30	30	**36.9**	.441	**.378**	**.827**	**5.5**	**4.2**	**1.5**	**.6**	**24.7**
Career		131	122	32.8	.434	.330	.760	3.3	3.0	1.1	.3	13.9
