= Stacy Adams (American football) =

American football player and coach (born 1966)

Biographical details
- Born: June 22, 1966 (age 60); Gary, Indiana

Playing career
- 1988–1989: Northwest Missouri State

Coaching career (HC unless noted)
- 1991–2004: Valparaiso (assistant)
- 2005–2009: Valparaiso

Head coaching record
- Overall: 15–40

Stacy Adams (born June 22, 1966) is an American former college football coach. He served the head football coach at Valparaiso University from 2005 to 2009, compiling a record of 15–40. He was the first black head football coach and the second documented black head coach at Valparaiso.

== Early years and playing career ==
Adams was born in Gary, Indiana and grew up in Glen Park. He graduated from Lew Wallace High School in 1984.

Adams played quarterback for Tom Horne at Joliet Junior College. After graduating from Joliet in 1987, he played at Northwest Missouri State University. In addition to quarterback, he played running back and outside linebacker. He earned a bachelor's degree from Northwest Missouri State in 1990. In 1997, he earned a master's degree from Valparaiso.

== Coaching career ==
In 1991, Horne added Adams to the coaching staff at Valparaiso. Adams was named the offensive coordinator and running backs coach in 1997. Adams also served as the quarterbacks coach while on the coaching staff.

In 2005, he was hired to replace Horne. He became the sixth coach of the Crusaders football team since 1946. When he was hired, he was the only Division I black head football coach in Indiana In 2006, Adams was one of only ten black head coaches in Division I. In his first game as head coach on September 3, 2005, Jeff Horton set Valparaiso's single-game rushing record with 253 yards in a game against Wisconsin Lutheran College. The Crusaders extended Adams's contract in 2006. The Crusaders have won all of their conference championships since 1968 while Adams has been on the coaching staff.

Adams resigned after the 2009 season. He was replaced by Dale Carlson.

== Personal life ==
Adams was born to Jimmie and Shirley Adams. He is married and has one son and two stepsons. He is now working as the athletic director at Valparaiso High School.

== Head coaching record ==
Year	Team	Overall	Conference	Standing	Bowl/playoffs
Valparaiso Crusaders (Pioneer Football League) (2005–2009)
2005	Valparaiso	3–8	1–3	4th (North)	
2006	Valparaiso	3–8	1–6	T–th	
2007	Valparaiso	5–6	2–5	T–6th	
2008	Valparaiso	3–8	2–6	8th	
2009	Valparaiso	1–10	0–8	10th	
Valparaiso:		15–40	6–28		
Total:		15–40			
