= Leon Clark (basketball) =

American basketball player (born 1943)

Personal information
- Born: June 11, 1943 (age 83) Harvey, Illinois, U.S.
- Listed height: 6 ft 6 in (1.98 m)
- Listed weight: 200 lb (91 kg)

Career information
- High school: Thornton Township (Harvey, Illinois)
- College: Wyoming (1963–1966)
- NBA draft: 1966: 2nd round, 18th overall pick
- Drafted by: Boston Celtics
- Position: Power forward / center

Career history
- 1966–1967: Hartford Capitols

Career highlights
- AAU All-American (1966); 2× First-team All-WAC (1965, 1966)
- Stats at Basketball Reference

Leon Clark (born June 11, 1943) is an American former basketball player. He played at Thornton Township High School in his hometown of Harvey, Illinois, and led his team to a second-place state finish in his junior season. Clark played collegiately for the Wyoming Cowboys where he is considered one of the program's greatest players. He played as an undersized center for the Cowboys and led the Western Athletic Conference (WAC) in rebounding in 1965 and 1966. Clark earned first-team All-WAC honors in his final two seasons. Clark finished his collegiate career as the Cowboys' all-time leader in rebounds with 889. (Note: Clark had his record first surpassed by Fennis Dembo in 1988 and now ranks fifth.)

Clark was selected by the Boston Celtics as the 18th overall pick of the 1966 NBA draft. He and his representative wrote a letter to Celtics general manager Red Auerbach asking for a two-year guaranteed deal worth $40,000. Auerbach read the letter aloud before he tore it up while negotiating the contract of fellow Celtics draft pick Jim Barnett, who received a much lower offer. Clark spent the 1966 preseason with the Celtics and was considered a strong contender to make the final roster a month before the season began after he attempted to translate his playing position to a forward. He was cut by the Celtics before the start of the 1966–67 season and ultimately never played a game in the National Basketball Association (NBA).

Clark played for the Hartford Capitols of the Eastern Professional Basketball League during the 1966–67 season. He also played professionally in Europe.

Clark was inducted into the Illinois Basketball Coaches Association Hall of Fame in 1974 and the University of Wyoming Intercollegiate Athletics Hall of Fame in 2004.
