= ACB Most Spectacular Player =

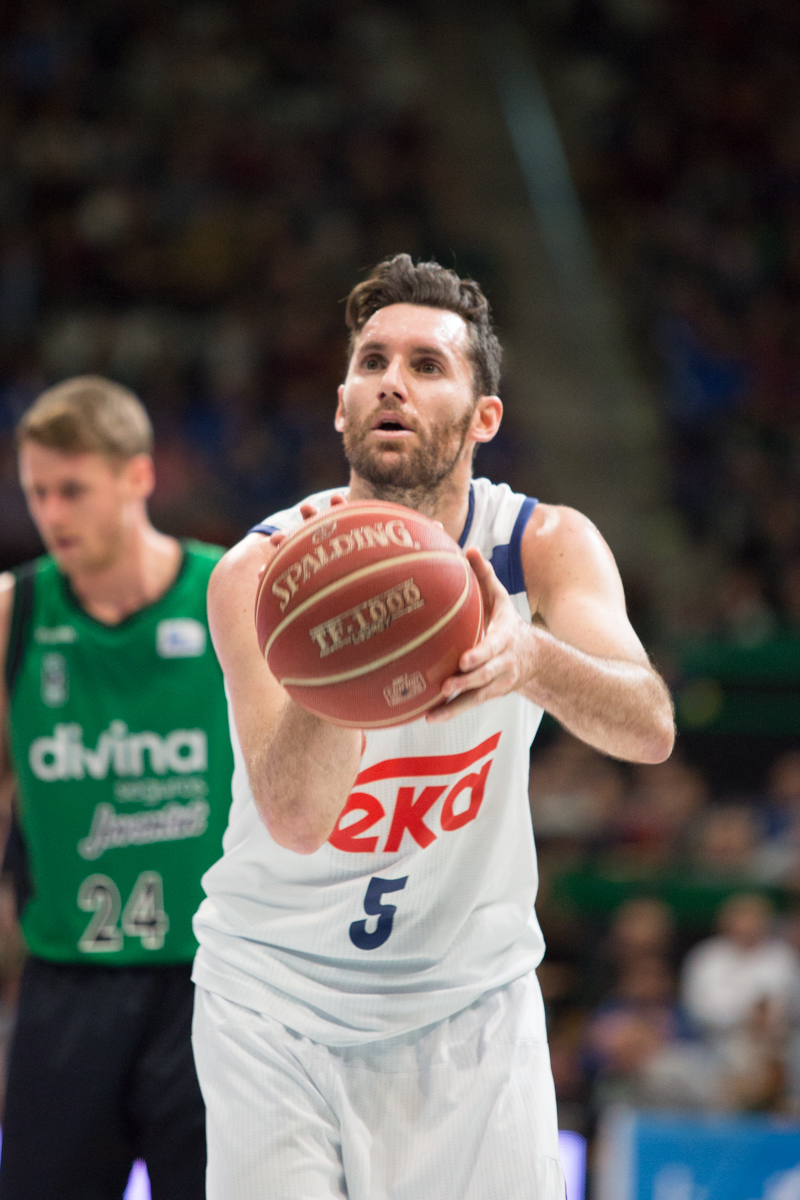
Rudy Fernández (#5 in white), was the ACB's Most Spectacular Player in 2013.

The ACB Most Spectacular Player, also known as the KIA ACB Most Spectacular Player for sponsorship reasons, is the annual award that is given to the "most spectacular player" of each regular season phase of the Liga ACB, which is the top-tier level professional club basketball league in the country of Spain. The award began with the Liga ACB 2008–09 season.

The award is given to the player with the most total points gathered throughout the season in each week's KIA Top 7 Plays of the Week. The #1 play of the week earns a player 7 points, the #2 play of the week earns a player 6 points, and so on.

== Most Spectacular Players ==
- Player nationality by national team:

Season	Most Spectacular Player	Team	Ref.
2008–09	(United States) Marcus Haislip	Málaga	
2009–10	(Spain) Ricky Rubio	Barcelona	
2010–11	(United States) Marcus Slaughter	CB Valladolid	
2011–12	(United States) Latavious Williams	Joventut	
2012–13	(Spain) Rudy Fernández	Real Madrid	
2013–14	(Spain) Sergio Rodríguez	Real Madrid	
2014–15	(United States) Latavious Williams (2×)	Bilbao	
2015–16	(Czech Republic) Tomáš Satoranský	Barcelona	
2016–17	(Argentina) Facundo Campazzo	Murcia	
2017–18	(Democratic Republic of the Congo) Christian Eyenga	Montakit Fuenlabrada	
2018–19	(Georgia (country)) Tornike Shengelia	Baskonia	
2019–20	(United States) Josh Adams	Unicaja Málaga	
2020–21	(Argentina) Leandro Bolmaro	Barcelona	
