= Hunter Maldonado =

American basketball player

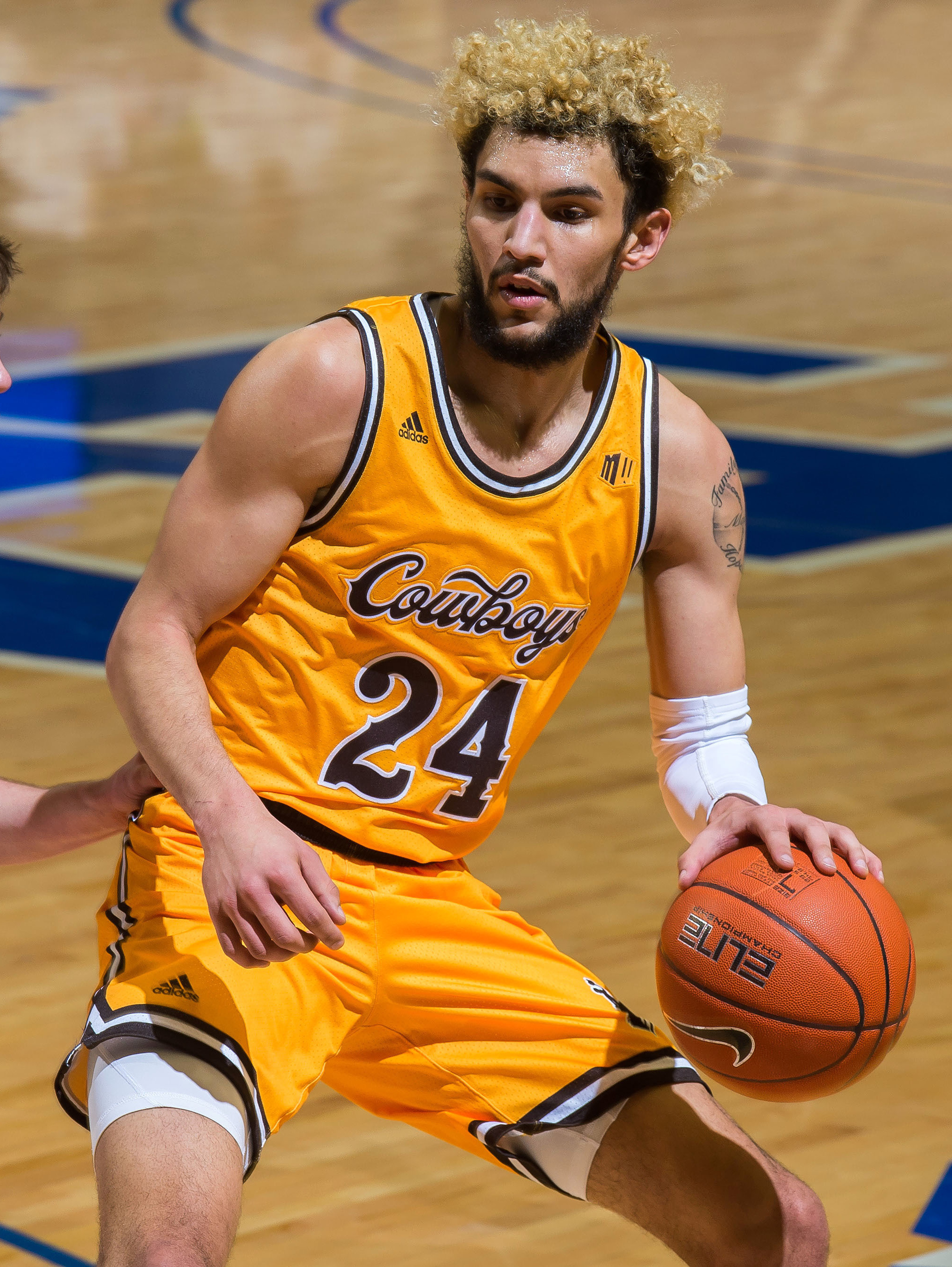
- Maldonado with Wyoming in 2021

No. 12 – Kaohsiung Aquas
- Position: Shooting guard
- League: Taiwan Professional Basketball League

Personal information
- Born: March 24, 1999 (age 27) Colorado Springs, Colorado, U.S.
- Listed height: 198 cm (6 ft 6 in)
- Listed weight: 90 kg (198 lb)

Career information
- High school: Vista Ridge (Colorado Springs, Colorado)
- College: Wyoming (2017–2023)
- NBA draft: 2023: undrafted
- Playing career: 2023–present

Career history
- 2023–2024: Oklahoma City Blue
- 2024–2025: MHP Riesen Ludwigsburg
- 2025: South East Melbourne Phoenix
- 2025–2026: Brisbane Bullets
- 2026–present: Kaohsiung Aquas

Career highlights
- NBA G League champion (2024); First–team All-Mountain West (2022); Second-team All-Mountain West (2023); Third–team All-Mountain West (2020)
- Stats at Basketball Reference

Hunter Alan Maldonado (born March 24, 1999) is an American professional basketball player for the Kaohsiung Aquas of the Taiwan Professional Basketball League (TPBL). He played college basketball for the Wyoming Cowboys.

== High school career ==
Maldonado attended Vista Ridge High School in Colorado Springs, Colorado. As a junior, he averaged 22.6 points, 6.9 rebounds and two steals per game, helping lead Vista Ridge to a 20–7 record and a berth in the 4A state semifinals. Maldonado was named The Gazette 5A-4A Boys' Basketball Peak Performer of the Year. He scored 37 points in a loss to Pueblo West High School. Regarded as a two-star recruit, in June 2016, Maldonado committed to playing college basketball for Wyoming. He had received interest from several other Division I programs and a scholarship offer from Division II Colorado–Colorado Springs.

== College career ==
Maldonado averaged 5.3 points and 2.2 rebounds per game as a freshman, making 19 starts. As a sophomore, Maldonado averaged 13.8 points and 6.8 rebounds per game in eight games. However, his season was ended by a sprained knee ligament and back spasms, and he took a medical redshirt. On November 5, 2019, he scored a season-high 32 points in a 54–40 win over Idaho State. Maldonado averaged 15.8 points, 5.8 rebounds, and four assists per game as a redshirt sophomore, while shooting 42 percent from the field. He was a Third Team All-Mountain West selection by the league media. On December 12, 2020, he scored a season-high 30 points in a 93–88 win over Utah Valley. As a redshirt junior, Maldonado averaged 12.5 points per game, and led Wyoming with 6.8 rebounds and 4.6 assists per game. On January 31, 2022, he scored a career-high 35 points in a 84–78 overtime win against Colorado State. Maldonado was named to the First Team All-Mountain West as a fifth-year senior.

On March 22, 2022, Maldonado declared for the 2022 NBA draft while maintaining his college eligibility, but later withdrew from the draft after receiving no interest from NBA teams.

On February 9, 2023, he scored 17 points in a 69–59 loss to UNLV and became the fifth player in program history to pass the 2,000-point threshold.

== Professional career ==
=== Oklahoma City Blue (2023–2024) ===
After going undrafted in the 2023 NBA draft, Maldonado joined the Oklahoma City Thunder for the 2023 NBA Summer League. He signed with the Thunder on October 18, 2023, but was waived the next day. He subsequently joined the Oklahoma City Blue of the NBA G League. He helped the Blue win the NBA G League championship. In 53 games during the 2023–24 season, he averaged 11.9 points, 4.7 rebounds, 4.7 assists and 1.1 steals per game.

Maldonado re-joined the Oklahoma City Thunder for the 2024 NBA Summer League.

=== MHP Riesen Ludwigsburg (2024–2025) ===
On July 31, 2024, Maldonado signed with MHP Riesen Ludwigsburg of the Basketball Bundesliga (BBL). In 30 games during the 2024–25 BBL season, he averaged 10.0 points, 4.2 rebounds, 1.8 assists and 1.3 steals per game. He also averaged 8.6 points, 4.4 rebounds and 1.9 assists in 12 FIBA Europe Cup games.

Maldonado joined the Indiana Pacers for the 2025 NBA Summer League.

=== South East Melbourne Phoenix (2025) ===
On August 5, 2025, Maldonado signed with the South East Melbourne Phoenix of the Australian National Basketball League (NBL) for the 2025–26 season. He was released by the Phoenix on December 26, 2025, after averaging 8.9 points and 4.3 assists in 16 games.

=== Brisbane Bullets (2025–2026) ===
On December 27, 2025, Maldonado signed with the Brisbane Bullets as an injury replacement for Dakota Mathias.

=== Kaohsiung Aquas (2026–present) ===
On February 28, 2026, Maldonado signed with the Kaohsiung Aquas of the Taiwan Professional Basketball League (TPBL). On July 27, the Kaohsiung Aquas announced that Maldonado returned to the team.

== Career statistics ==
Legend
GP	Games played	GS	Games started	MPG	Minutes per game
FG%	Field goal percentage	3P%	3-point field goal percentage	FT%	Free throw percentage
RPG	Rebounds per game	APG	Assists per game	SPG	Steals per game
BPG	Blocks per game	PPG	Points per game	**Bold**	Career high

=== College ===
Year	Team	GP	GS	MPG	FG%	3P%	FT%	RPG	APG	SPG	BPG	PPG
2017–18	Wyoming	29	19	21.2	.388	.304	.735	2.2	1.4	1.0	.2	5.3
2018–19	Wyoming	8	5	32.5	.420	.333	.625	**6.8**	2.3	1.1	**.5**	13.8
2019–20	Wyoming	**33**	**33**	35.3	.422	.295	.708	5.8	4.0	1.2	**.5**	15.8
2020–21	Wyoming	25	25	35.8	.419	.200	.694	**6.8**	4.6	1.2	.4	12.5
2021–22	Wyoming	**33**	**33**	**37.3**	**.495**	.250	.711	5.7	**6.3**	1.2	.1	**18.5**
2022–23	Wyoming	29	29	34.6	.481	**.338**	**.753**	4.8	4.0	**1.4**	.3	15.6
Career		157	144	32.9	.449	.283	.715	5.1	4.0	1.2	.3	13.7
