= Reggie Slater =

American basketball player (born 1970)

Personal information
- Born: August 27, 1970 (age 55) Houston, Texas, U.S.
- Listed height: 6 ft 7 in (2.01 m)
- Listed weight: 300 lb (136 kg)

Career information
- High school: Kashmere (Houston, Texas)
- College: Wyoming (1988–1992)
- NBA draft: 1992: undrafted
- Playing career: 1992–2003
- Position: Power forward
- Number: 35, 40, 50, 24

Career history
- 1992–1993: Peñas Huesca
- 1993–1994: Girona
- 1994–1995: Denver Nuggets
- 1995: Portland Trail Blazers
- 1995: Chicago Rockers
- 1995–1996: Denver Nuggets
- 1996: Dallas Mavericks
- 1996: Ülkerspor
- 1996–1997: La Crosse Bobcats
- 1997–1999: Toronto Raptors
- 1999–2000: Montecatini SC
- 2000–2001: Minnesota Timberwolves
- 2001: New Jersey Nets
- 2001–2002: Atlanta Hawks
- 2002: Kansas City Knights
- 2002: Basket Livorno
- 2002–2003: Minnesota Timberwolves
- 2003: Caja San Fernando
- 2003: Unicaja Málaga

Career highlights
- CBA All-Star (1997); All-CBA First Team (1997); WAC Player of the Year (1992); 3× First-team All-WAC (1990–1992)
- Stats at NBA.com
- Stats at Basketball Reference

Reginald Dwayne Slater (born August 27, 1970) is an American former professional basketball player born in Houston, Texas. He played the power forward position and played college basketball for the Wyoming Cowboys. His son Rashawn Slater was a first round draft choice by the Los Angeles Chargers. Reggie married Katie Slater. Reggie has four kids, Aliyah Slater, Reginald Slater Jr. (RJ), Rashawn Slater, and Rylan Slater. RJ played football for the Air Force Academy in 2014–2018, while Rashawn is an offensive tackle for the Los Angeles Chargers.

== Professional career ==
Slater was not selected in the 1992 NBA draft and played professionally in Spain for two years before being signed by the Denver Nuggets in 1994.

Slater played in eight NBA seasons for the Nuggets, Portland Trail Blazers, Dallas Mavericks, Toronto Raptors, Minnesota Timberwolves, New Jersey Nets and Atlanta Hawks from 1994 to 1999 and 2000–2003. Over the course of his NBA career, Slater played in 259 games and scored a total of 1,450 points and averaged 5.6 points and 3.0 rebounds per game. His best NBA season came during the 1997–98 NBA season as a member of the Raptors, where he appeared in 78 games and averaged 8.0 points, 3.9 rebounds, 0.9 assists, 0.6 steals and 0.4 blocks in 21.3 minutes per game, all career bests except for blocks. As a result, more than 43 percent of his NBA career scoring and more than 30 percent of his NBA career games played totals came during that season.

Slater played in the Continental Basketball Association (CBA) for the Chicago Rockers and La Crosse Bobcats from 1995 to 1997. He was selected to the All-CBA First Team in 1997.
