= Djibril Thiam =

Senegalese basketball player

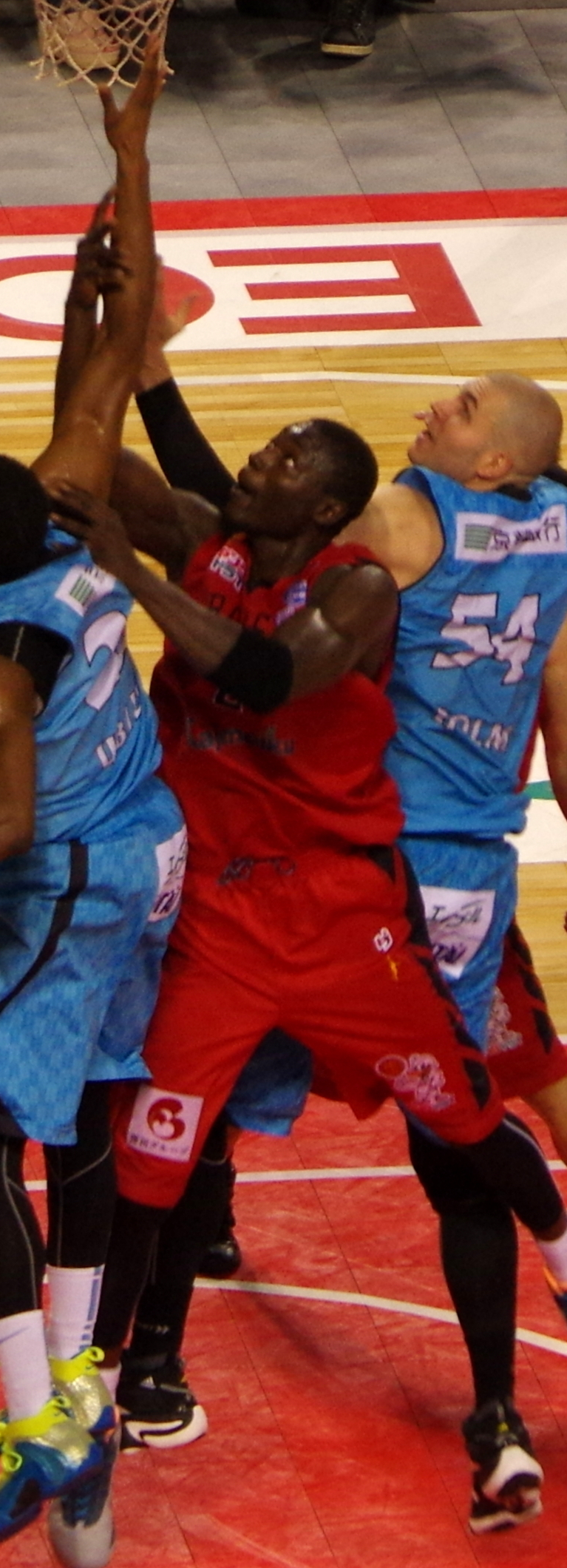

Personal information
- Born: July 6, 1986 (age 40) Dakar, Senegal
- Listed height: 6 ft 9 in (2.06 m)
- Listed weight: 193 lb (88 kg)

Career information
- High school: Stoneridge Prep (Simi Valley, California)
- College: Baylor (2007–2008); Wyoming (2008–2011)
- NBA draft: 2011: undrafted
- Playing career: 2011–2019
- Position: Forward

Career history
- 2011–2012: Al Sadd
- 2012–2013: North Dallas Vandals
- 2013–2014: Sitra Club
- 2014: Toyama Grouses
- 2014: ASE Essaouira
- 2014–2015: Ohud Medina
- 2015–2017: Al-Fateh
- 2017–2018: Plano Mighty Kings
- 2018–2019: S.O. Pont de Cheruy
Medals
Men's basketball
Representing Senegal
AfroBasket
Bronze medal – third place	2017 Tunisia/Senegal

Djibril Thiam (born July 6, 1986) is a Senegalese former professional basketball player for Al-Fateh and the Senegalese national team, where he participated at the 2014 FIBA Basketball World Cup.
