= Joe Capua =

American basketball player

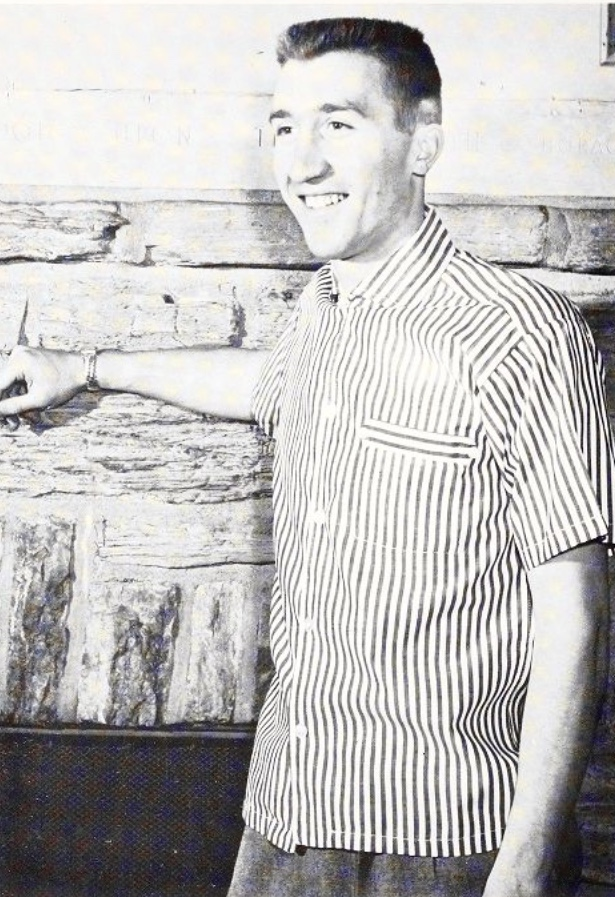
- Capua as a senior at Wyoming.

Personal information
- Born: February 26, 1934 Gary, Indiana, U.S.
- Died: February 15, 1988 (aged 53) Dallas, Texas, U.S.
- Listed height: 5 ft 9 in (1.75 m)
- Listed weight: 155 lb (70 kg)

Career information
- High school: Lew Wallace (Gary, Indiana)
- College: Wyoming (1953–1956)
- NBA draft: 1956: undrafted
- Playing career: 1956–1959
- Position: Point guard

Career history
- 1956–1959: D-C Truckers

Career highlights
- Third-team All-American – NEA (1956); Skyline Player of the Year (1956); 2× First-team All-Skyline (1955, 1956)

Joseph Louis Capua (February 26, 1934 – February 15, 1988) was an American college basketball player who was an All-American at the University of Wyoming known for his small stature and prolific scoring ability.

Capua played high school basketball for Lew Wallace High School in Gary, Indiana. Though he was named all-state in his senior year, he was not recruited by nearby Big Ten Conference schools due to his size – only 5 ft 6 in (1.68 m) at the time (he would later grow to 5 ft 9 in (1.75 m)). Lew Wallace and Wyoming alum Milo Komenich facilitated suggested his move to his college alma mater to play for his former coach Everett Shelton. As the team's point guard, Capua led the Cowboys' fast break and as a junior he came into his own as a scorer, ending the season averaging 14.2 points per game and making the All-Skyline Conference first team.

As a senior in the 1955–56 season, Capua became one of the top scorers in the Skyline Conference and the nation at 24.5 points per game. Despite a disappointing 7–19 overall season for the Cowboys, Capua set several school and conference records, including a then-records for most points in a game (51) and season (637). At the close of the season, Capua was again named first-team all-conference and was additionally named the Skyline Conference Player of the Year. Nationally, he was named a third-team All-American by the Newspaper Enterprise Association (NEA) and was named to the national "Small-America" team by the United Press International (UPI) for the top players 5 ft 10 in (1.78 m) or shorter. Coach Shelton would describe Capua one of his best all-time players and compared him favorably to Hall of Fame guard Ken Sailors. In 2001 he was inducted into the University of Wyoming Athletic Hall of Fame.

Following the close of his college career, Capua was not drafted in the 1956 NBA draft. He instead went on to play in the Amateur Athletic Union (AAU) for the Denver-Chicago Truckers.
