= Josh Davis (basketball, born 1980) =

American basketball player

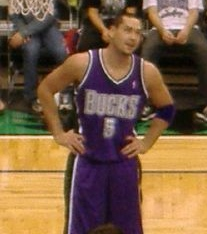
- Davis with the Milwaukee Bucks in 2005

Personal information
- Born: August 10, 1980 (age 46) Salem, Oregon, U.S.
- Listed height: 6 ft 8 in (2.03 m)
- Listed weight: 235 lb (107 kg)

Career information
- High school: Salem Academy (Salem, Oregon)
- College: Wyoming (1998–2002)
- NBA draft: 2002: undrafted
- Playing career: 2002–2013
- Position: Power forward
- Number: 5, 23, 18, 15

Career history
- 2002–2003: Sicc Jesi
- 2003–2004: Idaho Stampede
- 2004: Atlanta Hawks
- 2004: Baloncesto León
- 2004–2005: Philadelphia 76ers
- 2005: Milwaukee Bucks
- 2005: Idaho Stampede
- 2006: Houston Rockets
- 2006: Phoenix Suns
- 2006: Idaho Stampede
- 2006–2007: Dynamo Moscow Region
- 2007–2008: Kyiv
- 2008–2009: Colorado 14ers
- 2009: Cangrejeros de Santurce
- 2009–2010: Panellinios
- 2010–2011: Bancatercas Teramo
- 2011–2012: Memphis Grizzlies
- 2012: Austin Toros
- 2013: Guaiqueríes de Margarita

Career highlights
- All-NBA D-League Second Team (2009); CBA Most Valuable Player (2004); CBA All-Star (2004); CBA Newcomer of the Year (2004); CBA All-Rookie Team (2004)
- Stats at NBA.com
- Stats at Basketball Reference

Joshua Warren Davis (born August 10, 1980) is an American former professional basketball player.

== College career ==
Davis attended the University of Wyoming, where he played college basketball with the Wyoming Cowboys.

As a freshman during the 1998–99 season, Davis first displayed his potential when he recorded the first double-double of his career in the first month of the season against then No. 13 ranked Arizona. Davis scored 22 points and pulled down 13 rebounds versus the Wildcats. He ranked third on team in rebounding (6.0 rpg) and fifth in scoring (8.6 ppg). Davis received consistent minutes as a freshman, scoring in double figures in 11 of 27 games. His 6.0 rebounding average was the fifth best for a Cowboy freshman in history. Only Fennis Dembo (7.3 rpg), Reginald Slater (6.8), Bill Garnett (6.8) and Charles Bradley (6.2) had better averages.

Davis enjoyed a break-out season as a sophomore, earning First Team All-Mountain West Conference honors in voting by MWC coaches. He was the only sophomore in the conference to be selected to the First Team. Davis was also selected the Most Underrated Player in the Mountain West Conference in voting by conference media members. Twice during the 1999–2000 season, Davis earned MWC Player of the Week honors. As a sophomore, Davis led the Cowboys in scoring (14.3 points per game), rebounding (8.7 rebounds per game) and blocked shots (1.6 blocked shots per game). Davis ranked among the Top 10 individuals in the MWC in four different statistical categories as a sophomore—No. 9 in scoring (14.3 ppg), No. 3 in rebounding (8.7 rpg), No. 10 in field-goal percentage (.499) and No. 2 in blocked shots (1.6 bspg). He recorded 12 double-doubles in 31 games, scored in double figures 21 times and scored 20 or more points seven times during the season.

The Salem, Ore., native had an outstanding junior season culminating with his selection by Mountain West Conference media members as their Player of the Year. ESPN.com and CollegeInsider.com also selected Davis as MWC Player of the Year for the 2000–01 season. Davis was named the District 8 Player of the Year by the United States Basketball Writers Association (USBWA), and the National Association of Basketball Coaches (NABC) selected him First Team All-District 13. For the second consecutive season, he was named First Team All-Mountain West Conference by both MWC media and coaches. He also earned All-Tournament honors at the 2001 MWC Tournament, and earned one MWC Player of the Week honor. Davis led the Mountain West Conference in rebounding, averaging 9.4 rebounds per game. He ranked in the Top 15 in the league in six different statistical categories. In addition to rebounding, he ranked No. 9 in scoring (13.5 ppg), No. 3 in blocked shots (1.8 bspg), No. 10 in field-goal percentage (.485), No. 12 in steals (1.1 spg) and No. 13 in free-throw percentage (.733). Davis led the Cowboys in double-doubles with eight on the season. He scored in double figures 25 out of 30 games.

During his final season at the collegiate level, Josh Davis was among the elite players in college basketball. Numerous preseason publications rated Davis as one of the nation's best. Included in those preseason honors were: Honorable Mention All-America honors from Athlon Sports; being rated No. 5 in the country at power forward by Lindy's; being ranked No. 14 in the nation at power forward by The Sporting News; being rated No. 18 in the NCAA at his position by Basketball News; and being named the preseason MWC Player of the Year by MWC media, Athlon, Basketball News, Lindy's, The Sporting News and Street & Smith's. Davis entered his senior season as only the ninth player in school history to score 1,000 career points and grab 700 career rebounds. Davis led the Cowboys to a 22–9 regular season and into the second round of the NCAA tournament.

Davis finished his career as Wyoming's second all-time rebounder with 956, third in blocked shots with 173, and fifth in steals with 140.

== Professional career ==
Davis was drafted by the Dodge City Legend of the USBL following college, but instead opted to join Sicc Jessi of LegADue, the Italian second division. In the 2003–04 season, Davis played in the CBA with the Idaho Stampede, where he was named the league's newcomer of the year and most valuable player. Davis also played in four games with the NBA's Atlanta Hawks that season.

Davis played in 42 games for the Philadelphia 76ers in the 2004–05 season, making five starts. On Nov. 24, 2004, he scored a career-high 19 points against the Boston Celtics. In the 2005–06 season, Davis played a total of six games combined, with the Bucks, the Houston Rockets, and the Phoenix Suns. In between, he played with the Idaho Stampede.

He joined Dynamo Moscow Region of the Russian Superleague for the 2006–07 season. He then spent the 2007–08 season playing with Kyiv of the Ukrainian SuperLeague.

In 2008, Davis joined the Indiana Pacers for their training camp. He was waived on October 23, 2008. He later signed with the Colorado 14ers of the NBA D-League. On March 5, 2009, he signed with Cangrejeros de Santurce of the Puerto Rican BSN League. In November 2010 he signed with Bancatercas Teramo in Italy. He joined the Memphis Grizzlies in 2011 and played 15 games, averaging 1.9 points and 1.8 rebounds.

Davis' final NBA game was played on February 6, 2012, in a 84 - 89 loss to the San Antonio Spurs where he recorded 5 points, 4 rebounds and 1 steal. He was waived the next day on February 7, 2012.

As of 2013, Josh Davis is playing for Guaiqueríes de Margarita in Venezuela alongside former NBA players Renaldo Balkman and Antoine Wright.

== Career statistics ==
Legend
| GP | Games played | GS | Games started | MPG | Minutes per game |
| FG% | Field-goal percentage | 3P% | 3-point field-goal percentage | FT% | Free-throw percentage |
| RPG | Rebounds per game | APG | Assists per game | SPG | Steals per game |
| BPG | Blocks per game | PPG | Points per game | PIR | Performance index rating |
| **Bold** | Career high |

=== NBA ===
==== Regular season ====
| Year | Team | GP | GS | MPG | FG% | 3P% | FT% | RPG | APG | SPG | BPG | PPG |
|---|---|---|---|---|---|---|---|---|---|---|---|---|
| 2003–04 | Atlanta | 4 | 1 | 5.8 | **.400** | .000 | **1.000** | 1.3 | .0 | .0 | .0 | 1.3 |
| 2004–05 | Philadelphia | **42** | **5** | 7.8 | .378 | **.358** | .824 | **1.9** | .3 | .2 | **.1** | 2.8 |
| 2005–06 | Milwaukee | 4 | 0 | 3.0 | .250 | .000 | – | .8 | .3 | .3 | .0 | .5 |
| 2005–06 | Houston | 1 | 0 | .0 | – | – | – | .0 | .0 | .0 | .0 | .0 |
| 2005–06 | Phoenix | 1 | 0 | 5.0 | .333 | .000 | .667 | 1.0 | .0 | **1.0** | .0 | **4.0** |
| 2011–12 | Memphis | 15 | 0 | **8.7** | .370 | .308 | .500 | 1.8 | **.4** | .5 | **.1** | 1.9 |
| Career | | 67 | 6 | 7.4 | .373 | .329 | .724 | 1.7 | .3 | .3 | .1 | 2.3 |

==== Playoffs ====
| Year | Team | GP | GS | MPG | FG% | 3P% | FT% | RPG | APG | SPG | BPG | PPG |
|---|---|---|---|---|---|---|---|---|---|---|---|---|
| 2005 | Philadelphia | 2 | 0 | 2.0 | .000 | .000 | – | .5 | .0 | .0 | .0 | .0 |

== Personal life ==
In high school, Davis was a First Team All-State selection in Oregon his senior season. He led his Salem Academy team to a 23–7 record and a third-place finish in the Oregon Class 2A Championships. Davis was also named to the State Tournament All-Tournament team. He averaged 20 points, 12 rebounds, five blocked shots and four assists his senior season. Davis saved his best game for last as he scored 34 points and pulled down 14 rebounds, blocked five shots and handed out five assists in the third-place game at the state tournament. Other schools that recruited him included: Air Force, Boise State, Gonzaga, Idaho and Pacific.

Davis was also an accomplished multi-sport athlete. He earned All-State honors in baseball and All-Conference honors in baseball and soccer. Academically, Davis was involved in the advanced placement honors program at his high school, and was senior class president.

Born Aug. 10, 1980, he is the middle child of Katrina and William Davis, he has an older sister, Beth, and a younger brother Gabe. Davis comes from a very athletic family. His mother played volleyball at San Jose State, and his sister Beth played volleyball and softball at George Fox University. He majored in psychology.

His wife Jessica played soccer at University of Wyoming.
