= Fennis Dembo =

American basketball player (born 1966)

Personal information
- Born: January 24, 1966 (age 60) Mobile, Alabama, U.S.
- Listed height: 6 ft 5 in (1.96 m)
- Listed weight: 215 lb (98 kg)

Career information
- High school: Fox Tech (San Antonio, Texas)
- College: Wyoming (1984–1988)
- NBA draft: 1988: 2nd round, 30th overall pick
- Drafted by: Detroit Pistons
- Playing career: 1988–1998
- Position: Small forward
- Number: 34

Career history
- 1988–1989: Detroit Pistons
- 1990–1991: Rapid City Thrillers
- 1991–1992: Chorale Roanne
- 1992–1993: Rapid City Thrillers
- 1994: Shreveport Crawdads
- 1994–1995: SLUC Nancy Basket

Career highlights
- NBA champion (1989); Third-team All-American – AP (1988); WAC Player of the Year (1987); 2× First-team All-WAC (1987, 1988); No. 34 retired by Wyoming Cowboys
- Stats at NBA.com
- Stats at Basketball Reference
Medals
Men's basketball
Representing United States
Pan American Games
| Silver medal – second place | 1987 Indianapolis | Team competition |

Fennis Marx Dembo (born January 24, 1966) is an American former basketball player. He played college basketball for Wyoming, where he won several accolades and had his number 34 jersey retired. He started his professional career with the Detroit Pistons and with them won the NBA championship in 1989.

As a member of the United States national team, he won silver at the 1987 Pan American Games in Indianapolis.

== College career ==
Dembo was barely recruited out of high school in San Antonio, Texas, but caught a break when he was sought out by Wyoming's then head coach Jim Brandenburg, who had previously been a high school coach in that city (and would later retire to San Antonio). Dembo's campus visit was the first time he had seen snow; he went on a snowmobile trip as part of the visit, and would remember in a 2009 interview that he had a gut feeling that Wyoming was for him.

At Wyoming, Dembo had a successful career, finishing as the leading scorer and rebounder in Cowboys history. He accumulated 2,311 points and 954 rebounds. He was part of the Cowboys team that qualified for the finals at the 1986 National Invitation Tournament. The following year, the Cowboys qualified for the Sweet Sixteen of the 1987 NCAA Division I men's basketball tournament. At the 1987 NCAA Tournament, Dembo was the leading scorer, averaging 27.8 points per game. Dembo appeared on the cover of Sports Illustrated dressed as a cowboy. He was the first basketball player from the University of Wyoming to be featured on the SI cover. He was inducted into the University of Wyoming Athletics Hall of Fame on October 29, 1993. His number was retired and hosted up in Wyoming's Arena Auditorium during half time on December 7, 2019.

== Professional career ==
Dembo was selected by the Detroit Pistons in the second round (30th overall) of the 1988 NBA draft. He played for the Pistons during the 1988–89 season, averaging 1.2 points and 0.7 rebounds in 31 games.

Following his stint in the NBA, Dembo played for several years in Europe, South America and the CBA, retiring in 1998.

== Later life ==
He then bounced between several jobs, including a stint as a prison guard in Alabama. After separating from his second wife, he moved in with his mother in San Antonio, and found employment as a maintenance person for the San Antonio Water District.

Early on Easter morning in 2003, a man broke into Dembo's house while he and his mother were sleeping. Dembo grabbed a gun and faced the intruder, warning him to stop and leave. When the intruder failed to stop, Dembo shot and killed him. No charges were filed against Dembo, but he was shaken by the incident, fearful for a time to talk to others or to leave his room. He ultimately was able to move on from the shooting with counseling and time. His job with the Water District sparked an interest in engineering, and he began taking courses in the subject when his schedule allowed. In the autumn of 2009, he enrolled full-time at St. Philip's College, a community college in San Antonio. In the fall of 2009, he was enrolled at the University of Texas at San Antonio.

== Name ==
Dembo's unusual first name came from a suggestion by an older sister, Zona. He and his twin sister Fenise were the 11th and 12th children in their family. Zona preferred that they be the last children in the family, and suggested they be named after finis, French for "finish".

== Career statistics ==
Legend
| GP | Games played | GS | Games started | MPG | Minutes per game |
| FG% | Field goal percentage | 3P% | 3-point field goal percentage | FT% | Free throw percentage |
| RPG | Rebounds per game | APG | Assists per game | SPG | Steals per game |
| BPG | Blocks per game | PPG | Points per game | **Bold** | Career high |
| † | Won an NBA championship |

=== NBA ===
==== Regular season ====
| Year | Team | GP | GS | MPG | FG% | 3P% | FT% | RPG | APG | SPG | BPG | PPG |
|---|---|---|---|---|---|---|---|---|---|---|---|---|
| 1988–89† | Detroit | 31 | 0 | 2.4 | .333 | .000 | .800 | .7 | .2 | .0 | .0 | 1.2 |

==== Playoffs ====
| Year | Team | GP | GS | MPG | FG% | 3P% | FT% | RPG | APG | SPG | BPG | PPG |
|---|---|---|---|---|---|---|---|---|---|---|---|---|
| 1989† | Detroit | 2 | 0 | 2.0 | 1.000 | – | – | .0 | .0 | .0 | .0 | 1.0 |

== Awards and honors ==
- First Team All-Western Athletic Conference (1986, 1987, 1988)
- Western Athletic Conference Player of the Year (1987)
- NCAA basketball tournament record (Best Free Throw Percentage in One Game – 100%)
- Inducted into the University of Wyoming Athletics Hall of Fame in 1993
