= Wyoming Cowboys basketball =

Men's basketball team of the University of Wyoming

2026–27 Wyoming Cowboys basketball team
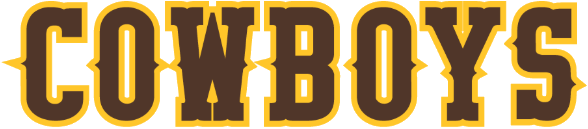
- University: University of Wyoming
- Head coach: Sundance Wicks (3rd season)
- Location: Laramie, Wyoming
- Arena: Arena-Auditorium (capacity: 11,612)
- Conference: Mountain West
- Nickname: Official: Cowboys Unofficial: Pokes
- Colors: Brown and gold

NCAA Division I tournament champions
- 1943
Other NCAA Division I tournament results
Final Four	1943
Elite Eight	1941, 1943, 1947, 1948, 1949, 1952
Sweet Sixteen	1952, 1953, 1967, 1987
Appearances	1941, 1943, 1947, 1948, 1949, 1952, 1953, 1958, 1967, 1981, 1982, 1987, 1988, 2002, 2015, 2022

Pre-tournament Helms national champions
- 1934

Conference tournament champions
- 1987, 1988, 2015

Conference regular-season champions
- 1928, 1931, 1932, 1933, 1934, 1936, 1941, 1943, 1946, 1947, 1949, 1952, 1953, 1958, 1967, 1969, 1981, 1982, 1986, 2001, 2002

Uniforms
Home	Away	Alternate

The University of Wyoming men's basketball program competes in the Mountain West Conference, with the schools first recorded game dating back to 1905. Wyoming won the 1943 NCAA championship under Hall of Fame coach Everett Shelton and behind star guard Ken Sailors, who pioneered the jump shot that is now the standard in basketball. Wyoming has made a total of 16 appearances in the NCAA tournament. Since the Mountain West was formed in 1999, Wyoming has won two conference titles, including an outright championship in 2002. Prior to that, Wyoming won five championships in the Western Athletic Conference, eight championships in the Skyline Conference, and one championship in the Rocky Mountain Athletic Conference.

== History ==
The Wyoming basketball program began in 1904 when a group known as the "Laramie Town Team" challenged a team from the university to a basketball game; Wyoming won that game by a score of 17–5. The team became a powerhouse in the 1930s under coach Willard "Dutch" Witte, who led the 1934 Cowboy team to a 26–3 record. Wyoming was retroactively named the 1934 national champion by the Helms Foundation. Witte coached a total of nine seasons in Laramie and compiled a 134–51 record.

After Witte stepped down in 1939, Everett Shelton took over the team and went on to become the winningest coach in Wyoming history in his 19 years in Laramie. Although Shelton went just 6–10 in his first season, his teams would win 20 or more games seven times during his career. In 1943, the Cowboys went 31–2 and won the NCAA tournament. That team was led by Ken Sailors, who scored 16 points in the championship game victory over Georgetown on his way to being named the tournament's Most Outstanding Player. In addition, Sailors was named college basketball's Player of the Year in 1943 and again in 1946 after returning from fighting in World War II. In all, the Cowboys made eight NCAA tournament appearances under Shelton, though they only won one game aside from the three-game run in 1943.

After Shelton retired in 1959, Wyoming basketball lay dormant for some time. Including Shelton's last four campaigns as head coach, the Cowboys endured nine consecutive losing seasons from 1956 to 1964. Coach Bill Strannigan, who succeeded Shelton, had just six winning seasons in 14 years as head coach and made one NCAA Tournament appearance in 1967 in which the Cowboys were handed a lopsided loss at the hands of eventual national champion UCLA and its All-American center Lew Alcindor, who later changed his name to Kareem Abdul-Jabbar. Again from 1971 through 1978, the Cowboys had one winning season, a 17–10 campaign under Don DeVoe in 1976–77.

In 1978, Jim Brandenburg became the Cowboys' head coach and the program experienced a resurgence. In his nine seasons, Wyoming did not have a single losing season and made four NCAA Tournament appearances. In 1981, the Cowboys were 24–6 and reached the second round of the NCAA tournament. In addition to being the Cowboys' first tournament appearance since 1967, it was their first 20-win season since 1952–53 and first NCAA tournament victory since 1952. After guiding the Cowboys to the Sweet 16 in 1987, however, Brandenburg left the Cowboys to become the coach at conference rival San Diego State. He was replaced by Benny Dees, who went 26–6 in his first year with the Cowboys and returned them to the NCAA tournament in 1988 in which they lost in the first round to Loyola Marymount.

Larry Shyatt went 19–9 in 1997–98, his only season in Laramie before becoming the head coach at Clemson University. After his departure, Steve McClain took over the head coaching job and had three consecutive 20-win seasons from 2001 to 2003, including conference titles in 2001 and 2002 and an NCAA tournament appearance in 2002. On March 22, 2007, Wyoming hired former Portland State head coach Heath Schroyer to become its next head coach. Shyatt was hired yet again as Wyoming's head coach after the 2010–11 season ended due to the firing of Heath Schroyer. The 2010–11 team's top two scorers left the program afterwards, with Desmar Jackson and Amath M'Baye transferring to Southern Illinois University and the University of Oklahoma, respectively.

The Cowboys went 21–12 in Shyatt's first season, for their first 20–win season in 9 years. They made the College Basketball Invitational each of the next three seasons, making the quarterfinals in 2012 and 2013. In the 2014–15 season, the Cowboys finished with a record of 25–10, won the Mountain West Conference tournament over San Diego State 45–43, and earned an automatic bid to the NCAA tournament. Larry Nance Jr. was drafted by the Los Angeles Lakers with the 27th pick in the 2015 NBA draft, becoming Wyoming's first player selected in the draft since Theo Ratliff in 1995. On March 21, 2016, Shyatt announced his resignation from the head coaching job, and Allen Edwards was announced as the 21st head coach in program history.

In Edwards' first season, the Cowboys went 23–15 and won the CBI tournament, defeating Coastal Carolina in the championship. Edwards again won 20 games in his second season. In 2019, Justin James was drafted 40th overall by the Sacramento Kings, becoming the second Cowboy in the decade to be taken in the NBA draft; he now plays in the Israeli Basketball Premier League. On December 9, 2019, the program retired Fennis Dembo's no. 34 jersey. Following two disappointing campaigns where the Cowboys failed to win 10 games each year, Edwards was let go as head coach. Jeff Linder was hired as the 22nd head coach in program history on March 17, 2020.

In Linder's first season with the Cowboys, he led the team to a 14–11 year despite inheriting a team with only 6 conference wins the two seasons prior. This included a 6–1 non-conference record highlighted by a road win against eventual Elite Eight participant Oregon State. The team's season ended in the Mountain West tournament quarterfinals 69–66 to eventual champion San Diego State.

== Head coaching records ==
Coach	Tenure	Seasons	Record	Win Pct.
W. Yates	1904–1906	2	4–2	.667
Lt. Coburn	1906–1908	2	5–7	.417
Elmer Hoefer	1908–1909	1	3–3	.500
Harold I. Dean	1909–1912	3	9–13	.409
Leon Exelby	1912–1913	1	2–5	.286
Ralph Thacker	1913–1915	2	3–7	.300
John J. Corbett	1915–1924	9	39–41	.488
Stewart Clark	1924–1928	4	44–26	.629
George McLaren	1928–1930	2	29–12	.707
Willard Witte	1930–1939	9	135–52	.722
Everett Shelton	1939–1959	19	328–201	.620
Bill Strannigan	1959–1973	14	179–187	.489
George Radovich	1973–1976	3	24–55	.304
Don DeVoe	1976–1978	2	29–25	.537
Jim Brandenburg	1978–1987	9	176–97	.645
Benny Dees	1987–1993	6	104–77	.575
Joby Wright	1993–1997	4	53–60	.469
Larry Shyatt	1997–1998	1	19–9	.679
Steve McClain	1998–2007	9	157–115	.577
Heath Schroyer	2007–2011	4	49–68	.419
Larry Shyatt	2011–2016	5	98–69	.587
Allen Edwards	2016–2020	4	60–76	.441
Jeff Linder	2020–2024	4	63–59	.516
Sundance Wicks	2024–present	2	30-35	.462
Totals	23 coaches	118 seasons	1,642–1,301	.558

== Postseason ==
=== NCAA tournament results ===
The Cowboys have appeared in the NCAA tournament 16 times, with a combined record of 9–21. They were national champions in 1943.

Year	Seed	Round	Opponent	Result
1941		Elite Eight; Regional 3rd Place	Arkansas; Creighton	L 40–52; L 44–45
1943		Elite Eight; Final Four; Championship	Oklahoma; Texas; Georgetown	W 55–50; W 58–54; W 46–34
1947		Elite Eight; Regional 3rd Place	Texas; Oregon State	L 40–42; L 46–63
1948		Elite Eight; Regional 3rd Place	Kansas State; Washington	L 48–58; L 47–57
1949		Elite Eight; Regional 3rd Place	#2 Oklahoma A&M; Arkansas	L 39–40; L 48–61
1952		Sweet Sixteen; Elite Eight	Oklahoma City; Santa Clara	W 54–48; L 53–56
1953		Round of 22; Sweet Sixteen; Regional 3rd Place	Bye # 16 Santa Clara #14 Seattle	— L 52–67; L 64–80
1958		Round of 24	#18 Seattle	L 51–88
1967		Round of 23; Sweet Sixteen; Regional 3rd Place	Bye #1 UCLA #10 Texas Western	— L 60–109; L 67–69
1981	5 W	Round of 48; Round of 32	(12) Howard (4) #19 Illinois	W 78–43; L 65–67
1982	8 W	Round of 48; Round of 32	(9) USC (1) #6 Georgetown	W 61–58; L 43–51
1987	12 W	Round of 64; Round of 32; Sweet Sixteen	(5) Virginia (4) #4 UCLA (1) #1 UNLV	W 64–60; W 78–68; L 78–92
1988	7 W	Round of 64	(10) #15 Loyola Marymount	L 115–119
2002	11 W	Round of 64; Round of 32	(6) Gonzaga (3) #7 Arizona	W 73–66; L 60–68
2015	12 E	Round of 64	(5) #11 Northern Iowa	L 54–71
2022	12 E	First Four	(12) Indiana	L 58–66

=== NIT results ===
The Cowboys have appeared in the National Invitation Tournament (NIT) nine times, with a combined record of 7–9.

Year	Round	Opponent	Result
1968	First Round	Villanova	L 66–77
1969	First Round	Army	L 49–51
1986	First Round; Second Round; Quarterfinals; Semifinals; Championship	Texas A&M; Loyola Marymount; Clemson; Florida; Ohio State	W 79–70; W 99–90; W 62–57; W 67–58; L 63–73
1991	First Round; Second Round	Butler; Colorado	W 63–61; L 75–83
1998	First Round	Gonzaga	L 55–69
1999	First Round; Second Round	USC; Oregon	W 81–77; L 72–93
2001	First Round	Pepperdine	L 69–72
2003	First Round; Second Round	Eastern Washington; North Carolina	W 78–71; L 74–90
2026	First Round	Wichita State	L 70–74

=== CBI results ===
The Cowboys have appeared in the College Basketball Invitational (CBI) five times, with a combined record of 7–5. They were champions in 2017.

Year	Round	Opponent	Result
2009	First Round	Northeastern	L 62–64
2012	First Round; Quarterfinals	North Dakota State; Washington State	W 76–75; L 41–61
2013	First Round; Quarterfinals	Lehigh; Western Michigan	W 67–66; L 67–75 ^{OT}
2014	First Round	Texas A&M	L 43–59
2017	First Round; Quarterfinals; Semifinals; Finals–Game 1 Finals–Game 2 Finals–Game 3	Eastern Washington; UMKC; Utah Valley; Coastal Carolina; Coastal Carolina; Coastal Carolina	W 91–81; W 72–61; W 74–68; L 81–91; W 81–57; W 83–59

=== National Campus Basketball Tournament results ===
The Cowboys appeared in the only National Campus Basketball Tournament, with a record of 1–2.

Year	Round	Opponent	Result
1951	Quarterfinals; Semifinals; 3rd Place Game	Duquesne; Bradley; Utah	W 78–61; L 63–77; L 52–55

== Records vs. Mountain West opponents ==
As of March 16, 2026

Opponent	Wins	Losses	Pct.	Streak
Air Force	87	43	.669	W 6
Boise State	15	28	.349	L 8
Colorado State	139	106	.567	L 1
Fresno State	19	25	.432	W 1
Grand Canyon	2	2	.500	W 1
Nevada	23	12	.657	W 1
New Mexico	72	82	.468	L 6
San Diego State	41	55	.427	L 15
San Jose State	24	6	.800	W 2
UNLV	22	48	.314	L 1
Utah State	53	41	.564	L 8

== Notable players ==
=== Statistical leaders ===
==== Career leaders ====
Career scoring leaders
Seasons	Player	Points
1985–88	Fennis Dembo	2,311
2006–09	Brandon Ewing	2,168
2017–23	Hunter Maldonado	2,158
2015–19	Justin James	2,061
1963–65	Flynn Robinson	2,049
1985–88	Eric Leckner	1,938
2013–16	Josh Adams	1,819
1989–92	Reggie Slater	1,809
1978–81	Charles Bradley	1,744
1995–98	Jeron Roberts	1,599

Career rebounding leaders
Seasons	Player	Rebounds
1989–92	Reggie Slater	1,197
1998–02	Josh Davis	956
1985–88	Fennis Dembo	954
1994–97	HL Coleman	939
1964–66	Leon Clark	889
1979–82	Bill Garnett	840
1978–81	Kenneth Ollie	833
1968–70	Carl Ashley	818
2017–23	Hunter Maldonado	808
2012–15	Larry Nance Jr.	807

Career assists leaders
Seasons	Player	Assists
2017–23	Hunter Maldonado	630
1984–88	Sean Dent	502
2006–09	Brandon Ewing	471
2002–05	Jay Straight	453
1999–03	Chris McMillian	434
1985–88	Fennis Dembo	410
2013–16	Josh Adams	398
1980–83	Mike Jackson	357
2006–08	Brad Jones	351
2010–12	JayDee Luster	344

Career blocks leaders
Seasons	Player	Blocks
1992–95	Theo Ratliff	425
2005–06	Justin Williams	244
2015–18	Alan Herndon	184
1998–01	Josh Davis	173
1985–88	Eric Leckner	164
2012–15	Larry Nance Jr.	135
1989–92	Reggie Slater	100
1979–82	Bill Garnett	97
2008–11	Djibril Thiam	95
1985–88	Fennis Dembo	95

Career steals leaders
Seasons	Player	Steals
1984–88	Sean Dent	249
2017–23	Hunter Maldonado	188
1985–88	Fennis Dembo	176
2006–09	Brandon Ewing	161
1995–97	LaDrell Whitehead	150
2013–16	Josh Adams	144
2012–15	Larry Nance Jr.	141
1999–02	Josh Davis	140
1999–03	Chris McMillian	136
2002–05	Jay Straight	126

Career games played leaders
Seasons	Player	Games
2017–23	Hunter Maldonado	157
2018–23	Hunter Thompson	137
2015–18	Alan Herndon	133
1985–88	Eric Leckner	131
2013–16	Josh Adams	131
2015–19	Justin James	131
1985–88	Fennis Dembo	129
1985–88	Turk Boyd	129
1985–88	David Lodgins	128
1984–88	Sean Dent	127

==== Single-season leaders ====
Single-season scoring leaders
Season	Player	Points
2015–16	Josh Adams	740
2018–19	Justin James	706
1964–65	Flynn Robinson	701
1986–87	Fennis Dembo	689
1962–63	Flynn Robinson	682
1963–64	Flynn Robinson	666
1987–88	Fennis Dembo	653
2021–22	Graham Ike	644
1955–56	Joe Capua	637
1986–87	Eric Leckner	634

Single-season rebounding leaders
Season	Player	Rebounds
1990–91	Reggie Slater	331
2005–06	Justin Williams	329
1989–90	Reggie Slater	328
1991–92	Reggie Slater	327
2021–22	Graham Ike	317
2016–17	Hayden Dalton	316
1964–65	Leon Clark	315
1952–53	Ron Rivers	314
1996–97	HL Coleman	303
1965–66	Leon Clark	302

Single-season assists leaders
Season	Player	Assists
2021–22	Hunter Maldonado	207
1986–87	Sean Dent	183
2008–09	Brandon Ewing	166
1985–86	Sean Dent	166
2004–05	Jay Straight	148
1991–92	Maurice Alexander	147
2006–07	Brad Jones	135
2018–19	Justin James	133
2019–20	Hunter Maldonado	132
1998–99	Chris McMillian	130

Single-season blocks leaders
Season	Player	Blocks
2005–06	Justin Williams	163
1994–95	Theo Ratliff	144
1992–93	Theo Ratliff	124
1993–94	Theo Ratliff	114
2004–05	Justin Williams	81
2016–17	Alan Herndon	74
2017–18	Alan Herndon	72
1989–90	Reggie Page	60
2013–14	Larry Nance Jr.	55
2012–13	Leonard Washington	55

Single-season steals leaders
Season	Player	Steals
1985–86	Sean Dent	93
1986–87	Sean Dent	75
1995–96	LaDrell Whitehead	70
2010–11	Desmar Jackson	61
1987–88	Sean Dent	61
1998–99	Anthony Blakes	59
1990–91	Maurice Alexander	58
2011–12	Luke Martinez	54
1993–94	David Murray	53
1998–99	Chris McMillian	52

=== Retired numbers ===
Wyoming Cowboys retired numbers
No.	Player	Playing years	No. ret.	Ref.
4	Ken Sailors	1940–1946	2008	
34	Fennis Dembo	1984–1988	2019	

=== All-Americans ===
Player	Year(s)	Team(s)
Les Witte	1932	Consensus First Team – Helms (1st), Converse (1st)
Les Witte	1933	Helms (1st)
Les Witte	1934	Consensus First Team – Helms (1st), Converse (1st)
Ken Sailors	1943	Consensus First Team – Helms (1st), Converse (3rd), Sporting News (1st)
Ken Sailors	1946	Consensus Second Team – Converse (2nd), True (1st), Sporting News (3rd)
Milo Komenich	1946	True (2nd)
John Pilch	1950	Look (2nd), Collier's (2nd)
Joe Capua	1956	NEA (3rd)
Bill Garnett	1982	USBWA (2nd)
Fennis Dembo	1988	AP (3rd)

== Cowboys playing in international leagues ==
- Louis Adams, playing in the Circuito de Baloncesto de la Costa del Pacífico
- Francisco Cruz, playing in the Basketbol Süper Ligi
- Justin James, playing in the Israeli Basketball Premier League
- Hunter Maldonado, playing in the Taiwan Professional Basketball League
- Noah Reynolds, playing in the Polish Basketball League

== Arena ==
The Arena-Auditorium, which seats 11,612, serves as the home court for the Cowboy basketball team. Since its opening in 1982, the Cowboys have enjoyed a strong homecourt advantage at the AA.

Wyoming's first home court was a small, red-brick building known as the "Little Red Gym." That was followed by the Half Acre Gym, which served as the Cowboys' home from 1925 to 1951 and seated just over 4,000; the Cowboys had a record of 222–44 in the building. The Cowboys moved into War Memorial Fieldhouse in 1951 and remained there until the Arena-Auditorium opened in 1982.
