= Eric Leckner =

American basketball player (born 1966)

Personal information
- Born: May 27, 1966 (age 60) Inglewood, California, U.S.
- Listed height: 6 ft 11 in (2.11 m)
- Listed weight: 265 lb (120 kg)

Career information
- High school: Mira Costa (Manhattan Beach, California)
- College: Wyoming (1984–1988)
- NBA draft: 1988: 1st round, 17th overall pick
- Drafted by: Utah Jazz
- Playing career: 1988–1999
- Position: Center / power forward
- Number: 45, 55

Career history
- 1988–1990: Utah Jazz
- 1990–1991: Sacramento Kings
- 1991–1992: Charlotte Hornets
- 1992–1993: Panna Firenze
- 1993–1994: Philadelphia 76ers
- 1994–1996: Detroit Pistons
- 1996–1997: Peristeri
- 1997: Charlotte Hornets
- 1997: Vancouver Grizzlies
- 1998–1999: Libertad de Sunchales

Career highlights
- 2× First-team All-WAC (1987, 1988)

Career NBA statistics
- Points: 1,835 (4.1 ppg)
- Rebounds: 1,418 (3.2 rpg)
- Stats at NBA.com
- Stats at Basketball Reference
Medals
Men's basketball
Representing United States
Summer Universiade
Silver medal – second place	1987 Zagreb	National team

Eric Charles Leckner (born May 27, 1966) is an American former professional basketball player who was selected by the Utah Jazz in the first round (17th overall) of the 1988 NBA draft. He attended Mira Costa High School in Manhattan Beach, California, and played collegiately at the University of Wyoming.

A center, Leckner played in 8 NBA seasons for the Utah Jazz, Sacramento Kings, Charlotte Hornets, Philadelphia 76ers, Detroit Pistons and Vancouver Grizzlies. His best year as a pro was during the 1993–94 season when he appeared in 71 games and averaged 5.1 ppg for the 76ers.

== College career ==
At Wyoming, Leckner had a successful career, finishing as the career leader in blocked shots and third leading scorer in Cowboys history. He accumulated 1,938 points, 774 rebounds and 164 blocked shots. He also holds the current University of Wyoming records for games played at 131 and field goal percentage at 61.2%. As a sophomore, he was a member of the Wyoming team that qualified for the finals at the 1986 National Invitation Tournament. The following year, the Cowboys qualified for the Sweet Sixteen of the 1987 NCAA Men's Division I Basketball Tournament. Leckner was inducted into the University of Wyoming Athletics Hall of Fame on September 25, 1998.

== Personal life ==
Eric Leckner married Jessica Kelly Lucason (born Boston, MA) in 2004. They have four children and reside in Charlotte, North Carolina, moving there in 2015 after eleven years in Manhattan Beach, California.

== Career statistics ==
Legend
GP	Games played	GS	Games started	MPG	Minutes per game
FG%	Field goal percentage	3P%	3-point field goal percentage	FT%	Free throw percentage
RPG	Rebounds per game	APG	Assists per game	SPG	Steals per game
BPG	Blocks per game	PPG	Points per game	**Bold**	Career high

=== NBA ===
==== Regular season ====
Year	Team	GP	GS	MPG	FG%	3P%	FT%	RPG	APG	SPG	BPG	PPG
1988–89	Utah	75	0	10.4	.545	–	.699	2.7	.2	.1	.3	4.3
1989–90	Utah	**77**	0	9.9	.563	–	.743	2.5	.2	.2	.3	4.3
1990–91	Sacramento	32	0	11.8	.406	–	.593	2.7	.6	.1	.3	2.9
1990–91	Charlotte	40	2	**18.6**	.465	–	.548	**5.2**	.5	**.3**	.3	**5.8**
1991–92	Charlotte	59	2	12.1	.513	.000	**.745**	3.5	.5	.2	.3	3.3
1993–94	Philadelphia	71	**36**	16.4	.486	.000	.646	4.0	**1.2**	**.3**	**.5**	5.1
1994–95	Detroit	57	11	10.9	.527	.000	.708	3.1	.2	**.3**	.3	3.9
1995–96	Detroit	18	8	8.6	**.621**	–	.615	1.9	.1	.1	.2	2.4
1996–97	Charlotte	1	0	11.0	.000	–	–	1.0	1.0	.0	.0	.0
1996–97	Vancouver	19	1	6.1	.467	–	.500	1.8	.2	.2	.1	1.8
Career		449	60	12.1	.508	.000	.669	3.2	.5	.2	.3	4.1

==== Playoffs ====
Year	Team	GP	GS	MPG	FG%	3P%	FT%	RPG	APG	SPG	BPG	PPG
1989	Utah	**3**	0	3.3	.250	–	–	.7	.0	.0	.0	.7
1990	Utah	**3**	0	**9.3**	**.600**	**1.000**	**.556**	**2.7**	**.7**	.0	.0	**6.0**
1996	Detroit	1	0	3.0	–	–	–	.0	.0	.0	.0	.0
Career		7	0	5.9	.500	1.000	.556	1.4	.3	.0	.0	2.9

== Awards and honors ==
Leckner won numerous awards during his career. The following are some of his achievements:

- First Team All-Western Athletic Conference (1987, 1988)
- Western Athletic Conference Tournament MVP (1986, 1987, 1988)
- Inducted into the University of Wyoming Athletics Hall of Fame (Individual, 1998) and (Team, 2011)
- Inducted into Mira Costa High School Athletic Hall of Fame (2020)
