= 1946–47 NCAA men's basketball season =

Men's collegiate basketball season

- NCAA Tournament: 1947
- Tournament dates: March 19 – 25, 1947
- National Championship: Madison Square Garden; New York City, New York
- NCAA Champions: Holy Cross Crusaders
- Helms National Champions: Holy Cross Crusaders
- Other champions: Utah Redskins (NIT)
- Player of the Year (Helms): Gerald Tucker, Oklahoma Sooners

The 1946–47 NCAA men's basketball season began in December 1946, progressed through the regular season and conference tournaments, and concluded with the 1947 NCAA basketball tournament championship game on March 25, 1947, at Madison Square Garden in New York, New York. The Holy Cross Crusaders won their first NCAA national championship with a 58–47 victory over the Oklahoma Sooners.

== Season headlines ==
- The Mid-American Conference began play, with five original members.
- The Western New York Little Three Conference began play.
- The Yankee Conference began play, with six original members.
- Ben Carnevale of Navy took the Midshipmen to the 1947 NCAA basketball tournament, becoming the first head coach to take two different teams to the NCAA tournament. He previously had taken North Carolina to the 1946 NCAA basketball tournament.
- George Kaftan of Holy Cross became the first player to score 30 points or more in a Final Four game of the NCAA basketball tournament, scoring 30 points against CCNY in a national semifinal game on March 22, 1947.
- Don Barksdale of UCLA was a 1947 consensus Second-Team All-American, becoming the first African-American to be named to the consensus all-America basketball team.
- In 1995, the Premo-Porretta Power Poll retroactively selected Kentucky as its top-ranked team for the 1946–47 season.

== Conference membership changes ==
School	Former conference	New conference
Butler Bulldogs	Independent	Mid-American Conference
Canisius Golden Griffins	Independent	Western New York Little Three Conference
Chicago Maroons	Big Ten Conference	No NCAA basketball program
Cincinnati Bearcats	Independent	Mid-American Conference
Connecticut Huskies	New England Conference	Yankee Conference
Dickinson College Red Devils	No NCAA basketball program	Middle Atlantic States Conference North
Harvard Crimson	Independent	Eastern Intercollegiate Basketball League
Maine Black Bears	New England Conference	Yankee Conference
Massachusetts Minutemen	Independent	Yankee Conference
New Hampshire Wildcats	New England Conference	Yankee Conference
Niagara Purple Eagles	Independent	Western New York Little Three Conference
Northeastern Huskies	New England Conference	Non-major basketball program
Ohio Bobcats	Independent	Mid-American Conference
Rhode Island State Rams	New England Conference	Yankee Conference
St. Bonaventure Brown Indians	Independent	Western New York Little Three Conference
Vermont Catamounts	Independent	Yankee Conference
Wayne Tartars	No NCAA basketball program	Mid-American Conference
Western Reserve Red Cats	No NCAA basketball program	Mid-American Conference
Yale Bulldogs	Independent	Eastern Intercollegiate Basketball League

== Regular season ==
=== Conferences ===
==== Conference winners and tournaments ====
Conference	Regular season winner	Conference player of the year	Conference tournament	Tournament venue (City)	Tournament winner
Big Six Conference	Oklahoma	None selected	No Tournament		
Big Nine Conference	Wisconsin	None selected	No Tournament		
Border Conference	Arizona	None selected	No Tournament		
Eastern Intercollegiate Basketball League	Columbia	None selected	No Tournament		
Metropolitan New York Conference	St. John's		No Tournament		
Mid-American Conference	Butler & Cincinnati	None selected	No Tournament		
Middle Atlantic States Conference North	Muhlenberg		No Tournament		
Missouri Valley Conference	Saint Louis	None selected	No Tournament		
Pacific Coast Conference	Oregon State (North); UCLA (South)		No Tournament; Oregon State defeated UCLA in best-of-three conference championship playoff series		
Southeastern Conference	Kentucky	None selected	1947 SEC men's basketball tournament	Jefferson County Armory, (Louisville, Kentucky)	Kentucky
Southern Conference	NC State	None selected	1947 Southern Conference men's basketball tournament	Duke Indoor Stadium (Durham, North Carolina)	NC State
Southwest Conference	Texas	None selected	No Tournament		
Western New York Little Three Conference	Canisius		No Tournament		
Yankee Conference	Vermont	None selected	No Tournament		

==== Conference standings ====
1946–47 Big Six Conference men's basketball standings
	Conf.				Overall
Team	W		L	PCT	W		L	PCT
Oklahoma	8	–	2	.800	24	–	7	.774
Missouri	6	–	4	.600	15	–	10	.600
Kansas	5	–	5	.500	16	–	11	.593
Iowa State	5	–	5	.500	7	–	14	.333
Kansas State	3	–	7	.300	14	–	10	.583
Nebraska	3	–	7	.300	10	–	14	.417

1946–47 Big Nine Conference men's basketball standings
	Conf.				Overall
Team	W		L	PCT	W		L	PCT
Wisconsin	9	–	3	.750	16	–	6	.727
Illinois	8	–	4	.667	14	–	6	.700
Indiana	8	–	4	.667	12	–	8	.600
Minnesota	7	–	5	.583	14	–	7	.667
Michigan	6	–	6	.500	12	–	8	.600
Iowa	5	–	7	.417	12	–	7	.632
Ohio State	5	–	7	.417	7	–	13	.350
Purdue	4	–	8	.333	9	–	11	.450
Northwestern	2	–	10	.167	7	–	13	.350

1946–47 Border Conference men's basketball standings
	Conf.				Overall
Team	W		L	PCT	W		L	PCT
Arizona	14	–	2	.875	21	–	3	.875
Arizona State–Flagstaff	11	–	5	.688	20	–	7	.741
New Mexico	10	–	6	.625	11	–	8	.579
Texas State M&M	9	–	7	.563	12	–	8	.600
West Texas State	8	–	8	.500	12	–	12	.500
Texas Tech	8	–	8	.500	10	–	12	.455
Arizona State–Tempe	5	–	11	.313	7	–	13	.350
Hardin–Simmons	5	–	11	.313	8	–	21	.276
New Mexico A&M	2	–	14	.125	8	–	17	.320

1946–47 Eastern Intercollegiate Basketball League standings
	Conf.				Overall
Team	W		L	PCT	W		L	PCT
Columbia	11	–	1	.917	15	–	5	.750
Cornell	8	–	4	.667	14	–	8	.636
Penn	7	–	5	.583	14	–	8	.636
Harvard	5	–	7	.417	16	–	9	.640
Dartmouth	5	–	7	.417	10	–	15	.400
Yale	4	–	8	.333	7	–	18	.280
Princeton	2	–	10	.167	7	–	16	.304

1946–47 Metropolitan New York Conference men's basketball standings
	Conf.				Overall
Team	W		L	PCT	W		L	PCT
St. John's	6	–	0	1.000	16	–	7	.696
CCNY	4	–	1	.800	17	–	6	.739
Fordham	4	–	2	.667	19	–	5	.792
NYU	3	–	3	.500	12	–	9	.571
St. Francis (NY)	2	–	3	.400	14	–	7	.667
Manhattan	1	–	5	.167	13	–	13	.500
Brooklyn	0	–	6	.000	12	–	8	.600

1946–47 Mid-American Conference men's basketball standings
	Conf.				Overall
Team	W		L	PCT	W		L	PCT
Butler	6	–	2	.750	16	–	7	.696
Cincinnati	6	–	2	.750	17	–	9	.654
Ohio	5	–	3	.625	13	–	10	.565
Western Reserve	2	–	6	.250	7	–	11	.389
Wayne	1	–	7	.125	3	–	15	.167

1946–47 Middle Atlantic States Conference North men's basketball standings
	Conf.				Overall
Team	W		L	PCT	W		L	PCT
Muhlenberg	7	–	1	.875	19	–	7	.731
Dickinson	4	–	1	.800	15	–	2	.882
Lafayette	6	–	2	.750	15	–	7	.682
Bucknell	6	–	3	.667	11	–	8	.579
Gettysburg	2	–	8	.200	7	–	14	.333
Lehigh	0	–	10	.000	5	–	13	.278

1946–47 Missouri Valley Conference men's basketball standings
	Conf.				Overall
Team	W		L	PCT	W		L	PCT
Saint Louis	11	–	1	.917	18	–	11	.621
Oklahoma A&M	8	–	4	.667	24	–	8	.750
Drake	8	–	4	.667	18	–	11	.621
Creighton	7	–	5	.583	17	–	8	.680
Washington University	3	–	9	.250	11	–	14	.440
Tulsa	3	–	9	.250	5	–	19	.208
Wichita Municipal	2	–	10	.167	8	–	17	.320

1946–47 Mountain States Conference men's basketball standings
	Conf.				Overall
Team	W		L	PCT	W		L	PCT
Wyoming	11	–	1	.917	22	–	6	.786
Utah	10	–	2	.833	19	–	5	.792
Denver	6	–	6	.500	16	–	10	.615
Utah State	6	–	6	.500	14	–	10	.583
Colorado	5	–	7	.417	7	–	11	.389
BYU	3	–	9	.250	9	–	16	.360
Colorado State	1	–	11	.083	3	–	18	.143

1946–47 Pacific Coast Conference men's basketball standings
	Conf.				Overall
Team	W		L	PCT	W		L	PCT
North
Oregon State †	13	–	3	.813	28	–	5	.848
Washington State	11	–	5	.688	23	–	10	.697
Washington	8	–	8	.500	16	–	8	.667
Oregon	7	–	9	.438	18	–	9	.667
Idaho	1	–	15	.063	4	–	24	.143
South
UCLA	9	–	3	.750	18	–	7	.720
California	8	–	4	.667	20	–	11	.645
Stanford	5	–	7	.417	15	–	16	.484
USC	2	–	10	.167	10	–	14	.417
† Conference playoff series winner

1946–47 Rocky Mountain Conference men's basketball standings
	Conf.				Overall
Team	W		L	PCT	W		L	PCT
Montana State	7	–	1	.875	25	–	11	.694
Colorado State–Greeley	6	–	2	.750	11	–	8	.579
Colorado College	5	–	3	.625	12	–	4	.750
Colorado Mines	1	–	7	.125	3	–	13	.188
Western State (CO)	1	–	7	.125	1	–	15	.063

1946–47 Southeastern Conference men's basketball standings
	Conf.				Overall
Team	W		L	PCT	W		L	PCT
Kentucky †	11	–	0	1.000	34	–	3	.919
LSU	9	–	2	.818	17	–	4	.810
Tennessee	10	–	3	.769	16	–	5	.762
Alabama	13	–	5	.722	16	–	6	.727
Tulane	8	–	4	.667	22	–	9	.710
Georgia Tech	6	–	6	.500	12	–	11	.522
Florida	4	–	4	.500	17	–	9	.654
Vanderbilt	4	–	7	.364	7	–	8	.467
Mississippi State	4	–	9	.308	10	–	11	.476
Georgia	4	–	9	.308	5	–	14	.263
Ole Miss	2	–	11	.154	7	–	14	.333
Auburn	1	–	15	.063	3	–	18	.143
† Regular-season championship and SEC Tournament winner

1946–47 Southern Conference men's basketball standings
	Conf.				Overall
Team	W		L	PCT	W		L	PCT
North Carolina State †	11	–	2	.846	26	–	5	.839
North Carolina	10	–	2	.833	19	–	8	.704
Duke	10	–	4	.714	19	–	8	.704
George Washington	9	–	4	.692	21	–	7	.750
Maryland	9	–	5	.643	14	–	10	.583
Richmond	8	–	5	.615	17	–	9	.654
South Carolina	7	–	5	.583	16	–	9	.640
Washington and Lee	7	–	6	.538	16	–	7	.696
Davidson	7	–	7	.500	17	–	8	.680
William & Mary	6	–	6	.500	14	–	12	.538
Wake Forest	8	–	9	.471	11	–	13	.458
Furman	5	–	7	.417	9	–	10	.474
Virginia Tech	4	–	9	.308	13	–	13	.500
Clemson	2	–	12	.143	7	–	13	.350
The Citadel	1	–	11	.083	5	–	11	.313
VMI	1	–	11	.083	2	–	14	.125
† Southern Conference Tournament winner

1946–47 Southwest Conference men's basketball standings
	Conf.				Overall
Team	W		L	PCT	W		L	PCT
Texas	12	–	0	1.000	26	–	2	.929
SMU	8	–	4	.667	14	–	8	.636
Arkansas	8	–	4	.667	14	–	10	.583
Baylor	6	–	6	.500	11	–	11	.500
Texas A&M	4	–	8	.333	8	–	17	.320
Rice	3	–	9	.250	7	–	17	.292
TCU	1	–	11	.083	1	–	22	.043

1946–47 Western New York Little Three Conference men's basketball standings
	Conf.				Overall
Team	W		L	PCT	W		L	PCT
Canisius	3	–	0	1.000	18	–	13	.581
Niagara	2	–	2	.500	13	–	8	.619
St. Bonaventure	0	–	3	.000	10	–	11	.476

1946–47 Yankee Conference men's basketball standings
	Conf.				Overall
Team	W		L	PCT	W		L	PCT
Vermont	1	–	0	1.000	19	–	3	.864
Connecticut	6	–	1	.857	16	–	2	.889
Rhode Island State	4	–	1	.800	17	–	3	.850
Maine	2	–	4	.333	9	–	8	.529
Massachusetts	0	–	2	.000	4	–	12	.250
New Hampshire	0	–	5	.000	6	–	11	.353

=== Major independents ===
A total of 50 college teams played as major independents. Duquesne (20–2) had the best winning percentage (.909) and Marshall (32–5) finished with the most wins.

1946–47 NCAA men's basketball independents standings
	Conf.				Overall
Team	W		L	PCT	W		L	PCT
Duquesne		–		–	20	–	2	.909
Holy Cross		–		–	27	–	3	.900
Seton Hall		–		–	24	–	3	.889
Marshall		–		–	32	–	5	.865
West Virginia		–		–	19	–	3	.864
Western Kentucky State		–		–	25	–	4	.862
Navy		–		–	16	–	3	.842
Santa Clara		–		–	21	–	4	.840
Notre Dame		–		–	20	–	4	.833
Hamline		–		–	22	–	5	.815
Bowling Green State		–		–	28	–	7	.800
Bradley		–		–	25	–	7	.781
LIU		–		–	17	–	5	.773
La Salle		–		–	20	–	6	.769
Syracuse		–		–	19	–	6	.760
Toledo		–		–	18	–	6	.750
Louisville		–		–	17	–	6	.739
Georgetown		–		–	19	–	7	.731
St. Joseph's		–		–	16	–	6	.727
Villanova		–		–	17	–	7	.708
Western Michigan		–		–	17	–	7	.708
Montana State		–		–	25	–	11	.694
Loyola (Ill.)		–		–	20	–	9	.690
Miami (Ohio)		–		–	15	–	7	.682
Indiana State		–		–	17	–	8	.680
Boston University		–		–	14	–	7	.667
Colgate		–		–	11	–	6	.647
DePaul		–		–	16	–	9	.640
Loyola (Md.)		–		–	20	–	12	.625
Nevada		–		–	19	–	13	.594
Army		–		–	9	–	7	.563
Penn State		–		–	10	–	8	.556
Boston College		–		–	12	–	10	.545
Kent State		–		–	13	–	11	.542
Michigan State		–		–	11	–	10	.524
Siena		–		–	12	–	11	.522
San Francisco		–		–	13	–	14	.481
Detroit		–		–	12	–	13	.480
Virginia		–		–	10	–	11	.476
Pittsburgh		–		–	8	–	10	.444
Saint Mary's		–		–	13	–	17	.433
Montana		–		–	12	–	16	.429
Brown		–		–	8	–	12	.400
Temple		–		–	8	–	12	.400
Marquette		–		–	9	–	14	.391
Rutgers		–		–	7	–	12	.368
Valparaiso		–		–	11	–	20	.355
Merchant Marine		–		–	8	–	16	.333
Xavier		–		–	8	–	17	.320
Dayton		–		–	4	–	17	.190

== Post-season tournaments ==
=== NCAA tournament ===
==== Semifinals and finals ====
National Semifinals
Holy Cross	60
CCNY	45
Texas	54
Oklahoma	55

National Finals
Holy Cross	58
Oklahoma	47
Third place
CCNY	50
Texas	54

=== National Invitation tournament ===
==== Semifinals and finals ====
Semifinals
Utah	64
West Virginia	62
Kentucky	60
NC State	42

Finals
Utah	49
Kentucky	45
Third place
West Virginia	52
NC State	64

== Awards ==
=== Consensus All-American teams ===
Consensus First Team
Player	Position	Class	Team
Ralph Beard	G	Sophomore	Kentucky
Alex Groza	C	Sophomore	Kentucky
Ralph Hamilton	G	Senior	Indiana
Sid Tanenbaum	G	Senior	New York University
Gerry Tucker	C	Senior	Oklahoma

Consensus Second Team
Player	Position	Class	Team
Don Barksdale	C	Senior	UCLA
Arnie Ferrin	F	Junior	Utah
Vern Gardner	C	Senior	Utah
John Hargis	G	Senior	Texas
George Kaftan	F	Junior	Holy Cross
Ed Koffenberger	C	Junior	Duke
Andy Phillip	G/F	Senior	Illinois

=== Major player of the year awards ===
- Helms Player of the Year: Gerald Tucker, Oklahoma

=== Other major awards ===
- NIT/Haggerty Award (Top player in New York City metro area): Sid Tanenbaum, NYU

== Coaching changes ==
A number of teams changed coaches during the season and after it ended.

Team	Former Coach	Interim Coach	New Coach	Reason
Army	Stu Holcomb		John Mauer	
Auburn	V. J. Edney		Danny Doyle	
Brown	Weeb Ewbank		Robert Morris	
Bucknell	J. Ellwood Ludwig		Jack Guy	
The Citadel	Whitey Piro		Bernard O'Neil	
Creighton	Eddie Hickey		Duce Belford	
Dayton	James Carter		Tom Blackburn	
George Washington	Otts Zahn		George Garber	
Idaho	Guy Wicks		Charles Finley	
Illinois	Douglas R. Mills		Harry Combs	
Iowa State	Louis Menze		Clay Sutherland	
Maryland	Burton Shipley		Flucie Stewart	
Mississippi State	Stanfield Hitt		Paul Gregory	
Montana State	Brick Breeden		Max Worthington	
New Mexico A&M	Jerry Hines		John Gunn	
Arizona State–Flagstaff	Frank Brickey		Nick Ragus	
Oregon	Howard Hobson		John A. Warren	
Saint Louis	John Flannigan		Eddie Hickey	
Saint Mary's	Clarence Andersen		Benjamin Neff	
Seton Hall	Bob Davies		Jack Reitmeier	
SMU	F. C. Baccus		Doc Hayes	
St. Bonaventure	Harry Singleton		Ed Melvin	
St. John's	Joe Lapchick		Frank McGuire	
Tennessee	John Mauer		Emmett Lowery	Mauer left to coach Army.
Texas State M&M	Dale Waters		Ross Moore	
Texas Tech	Berl Huffman		Polk Robison	
Toledo	Bill Orwig		Jerry Bush	
Tulsa	Don Shields		John Garrison	
Utah State	Bebe Lee		Joe Whitesides	
Valparaiso	Loren Ellis		Emory Bauer	
Vanderbilt	Norm Cooper		Bob Polk	
Virginia Tech	George S. Proctor		Red Laird	
VMI	Loyd Roberts		Frank Summers	
William & Mary	Richard F. Gallagher		Barney Wilson	
Yale	Ivy Williamson		Howard Hobson	
