= 1947 in basketball =

The following are the basketball events of the year 1947 throughout the world.

== April ==
- 27 April-3 May: EuroBasket 1947 : USSR

== Winners of major team competitions 1946–1947 ==
=== Men ===
Americas

- Basketball Association of America : Philadelphia Warriors

Europe

- France : Paris UC
- Greece : Panathinaikos B.C.
- Italy : Virtus Pallacanestro Bologna
- USSR : SKIF Kaunas
- Yugoslavia : KK Red Star Belgrade

College

- (United States) NCAA
  - NCAA tournament: Holy Cross 58, Oklahoma 47
    - Most Outstanding Player: George Kaftan, Holy Cross
  - National Invitation Tournament: Utah 49, Kentucky 45
- (United States) NAIA
  - NAIA: Marshall 73, Mankato State 59

=== Women ===
Europe

- France : US Métro Paris
- Italy : Bernocchi Legnano

== Births ==
- January 5 - Rick Mount, American Basketball player
- April 16 - Kareem Abdul-Jabbar, American Basketball Hall of Fame player
- June 22 - Pete Maravich, American Basketball Hall of Fame player
- November 15 - Bob Dandridge, American Basketball Hall of Fame player
- December 30 - Steve Mix, American Basketball player and coach

== See also ==
- 1947 in sports
