= 1947 NCAA basketball championship game =

1947 NCAA Tournament Championship Game
National championship game
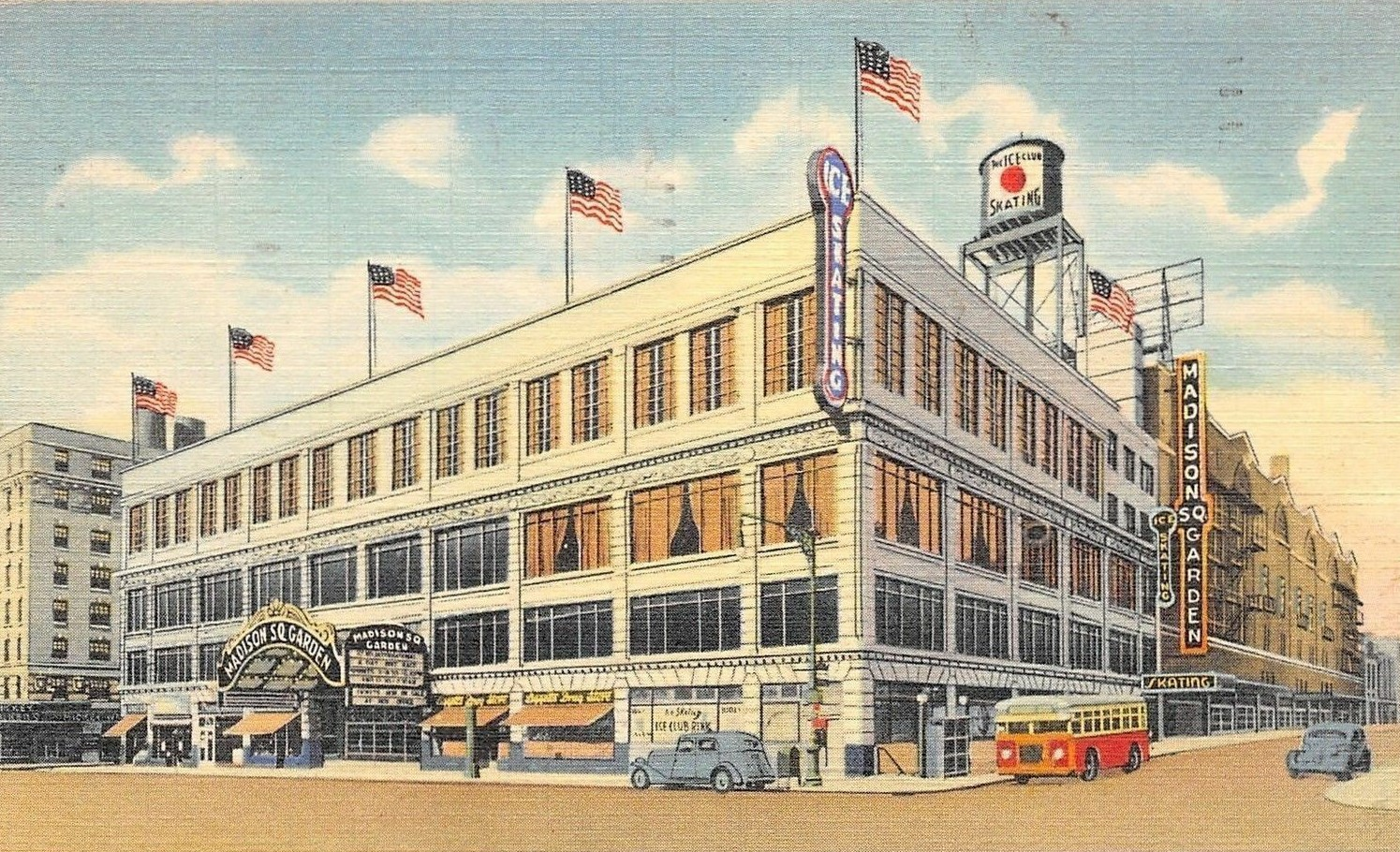
- Madison Square Garden in New York City hosted the championship game.
Oklahoma Sooners	Holy Cross Crusaders
Big Six	Independent
(24-6)	(24-7)
47	58
Head coach: Bruce Drake	Head coach: Doggie Julian
	1st half	2nd half	Total
Oklahoma Sooners	31	16	47
Holy Cross Crusaders	28	30	58
- Date: March 25, 1947
- Venue: Madison Square Garden, New York City
- MVP: George Kaftan, Holy Cross

The 1947 NCAA University Division Basketball Championship Game was the finals of the 1947 NCAA basketball tournament and it determined the national champion for the 1946-47 NCAA men's basketball season. The game was played on March 25, 1947, at Madison Square Garden in New York City. It featured the Oklahoma Sooners of the Big Six Conference, and the independent Holy Cross Crusaders.

== Participating teams ==
=== Oklahoma Sooners ===
- West
  - Oklahoma 56, Oregon State 54
- Final Four
  - Oklahoma 55, Texas 54 (rivalry)

=== Holy Cross Crusaders ===
- East
  - Holy Cross 55, Navy 47
- Final Four
  - Holy Cross 60, CCNY 45

== Game summary ==
March 25, 1947

Holy Cross Crusaders 58, Oklahoma Sooners 47
Scoring by half: 28-31, 30-16
Pts: George Kaftan 18	Pts: Gerald Tucker 22

Madison Square Garden, New York City
