= Holy Cross Crusaders men's basketball =

Men's basketball program representing the College of the Holy Cross

2026–27 Holy Cross Crusaders men's basketball team
- College: College of the Holy Cross
- Head coach: Dave Paulsen (3rd season)
- Location: Worcester, Massachusetts
- Arena: Hart Center (capacity: 3,536)
- Conference: Patriot
- Nickname: Crusaders
- Colors: Royal purple

NCAA Division I tournament champions
- 1947
Other NCAA Division I tournament results
Final Four	1947, 1948
Elite Eight	1947, 1948, 1950, 1953
Appearances	1947, 1948, 1950, 1953, 1956, 1977, 1980, 1993, 2001, 2002, 2003, 2007, 2016

NIT champions
- 1954

Conference tournament champions
- ECAC: 1977, 1980; Patriot League: 1993, 2001, 2002, 2003, 2007, 2016

Conference regular-season champions
- MAAC: 1990; Patriot League: 1994, 2001, 2003, 2005, 2007

Uniforms
Home	Away

The Holy Cross Crusaders men's basketball team represents the College of the Holy Cross in Worcester, Massachusetts (about 40 miles (64 km) west of Boston) in NCAA Division I competition. The team competes in the Patriot League and plays their home games in the Hart Center. Under coach Doggie Julian, the Crusaders won a national championship in 1947. It is the only school from Massachusetts to win an NCAA Division I tournament. Along with Final Four appearances in 1947 and 1948, Holy Cross has appeared 13 times in the NCAA tournament, most recently in 2016. Dave Paulsen was appointed the program's 19th head coach on March 28, 2023.

== History ==
=== Beginnings and national prominence ===
Basketball first appeared at Holy Cross in 1900 but was discontinued several times until its reinstatement in 1939. The Crusaders originally played their home games at the Boston Garden and the South High Community School. In 1947, the Crusaders, behind coach Doggie Julian, NCAA tournament MVP George Kaftan, star Joe Mullaney and freshman point guard Bob Cousy, beat Oklahoma at Madison Square Garden to win the NCAA championship.

The team entered the NCAA Division I men's basketball tournament as the last seed in the 8-team tournament. In the first game, Holy Cross defeated the Navy 55–47, in front of a sold-out crowd at Madison Square Garden. Mullaney led the team in scoring with 18 points, mostly in part to Navy coach Ben Carnevale's decision to have his players back off from Mullaney, who was reputed as being more of a playmaker than a shooter. In the semi-final match, Holy Cross faced the City College of New York, coached by Nat Holman. The Crusaders, led by Kaftan's 30-point game, defeated the Beavers 60–45. In the championship game, Holy Cross faced a Bruce Drake coached University of Oklahoma team in another sold-out game at Madison Square Garden. Kaftan followed up his semi-final game performance with 18 points in the title game, leading the Crusaders to a 58–47 victory against the Sooners. Along with UConn, Holy Cross is one of the two New England schools to ever win the NCAA tournament.

Holy Cross finished the 1947 championship season with 23 straight wins and became the first college from the New England area (as well as from the state of Massachusetts) to win a national college basketball title. 35,000 people watched a parade in the team's honor on Holy Cross Day in Worcester, Massachusetts. Future NBA legend Cousy was named AP and UP player of the year. In 1989, the NCAA voted teammate George Kaftan to the all-decade team of the 1940s.

The Crusaders followed up their championship by advancing to the 1948 NCAA Tournament's Final Four. After advancing to the Elite Eight in 1953, the Crusaders would wait 63 years before claiming another win in the NCAA Tournament.

In 1954, Holy Cross won the NIT Tournament behind another future NBA Hall-of-famer and Celtics legend Tom Heinsohn. This is widely recognized as the College's second national title in basketball due to the prestige of the NIT at the time.

In 1977, Holy Cross defeated a talented Providence team twice on last-second shots by forward Chris Potter and led top-ranked Michigan at the half in the first round of the NCAA tournament before being defeated. The following year, Sports Illustrated ranked Holy Cross and freshman of the year Ronnie Perry ninth in its pre-season poll.

Following the team's championship years of the 1940s and 1950s, the Crusaders have been ranked only occasionally by the Associated Press. After appearing in 65 of 116 total weekly polls (56%) in the 1950s, the Crusaders appeared in only five of 126 weekly polls (4%) in the 1960s and nine of 148 (6%) in the 1970s. The Crusaders have not been nationally ranked since January 1978.

=== Patriot League ===
Holy Cross could have joined the newly founded Big East Conference in 1980, but college President Rev. John E. Brooks, S.J., vetoed the move for academic reasons. Holy Cross stayed independent until joining the Metro Atlantic Athletic Conference (MAAC) to start the 1983–84 season. It moved to the Patriot League in 1991.

In recent decades, the men's basketball team has been the leading varsity program of the Holy Cross' athletic department. The men's basketball team has won six Patriot League titles (1993, 2001, 2002, 2003, 2007, 2016) since the league's formation in 1991.

With Ralph Willard as head coach, the Holy Cross men's team nearly accomplished three major upsets in the NCAA tournament. In 2001 as a fifteen seed, the Crusaders lost 72–68 to a second-seeded Kentucky team who advanced to the Sweet Sixteen. In 2002, the sixteenth-seeded Crusaders nearly became the first #16 seed to defeat a #1 seed, losing 68–59 to a top-seeded Kansas squad who advanced to the Final Four. The Crusaders led 37–35 at halftime, 44–39 with 11 minutes remaining and trailed by three points with fewer than two minutes remaining. In 2003 as a fourteenth seed, the Crusaders lost 72–68 to third-seeded, Dwyane Wade-led Marquette that would advance to the Final Four.

In 2016, the Crusaders made a miraculous run in the postseason. The team entered the Patriot League Tournament as the ninth seed and ultimately defeated second-seeded Lehigh in the championship game to earn an automatic bid to the NCAA Tournament for the first time since 2007. The Crusaders then defeated Southern University marking the first NCAA win for the program since 1953.

== Seasons ==
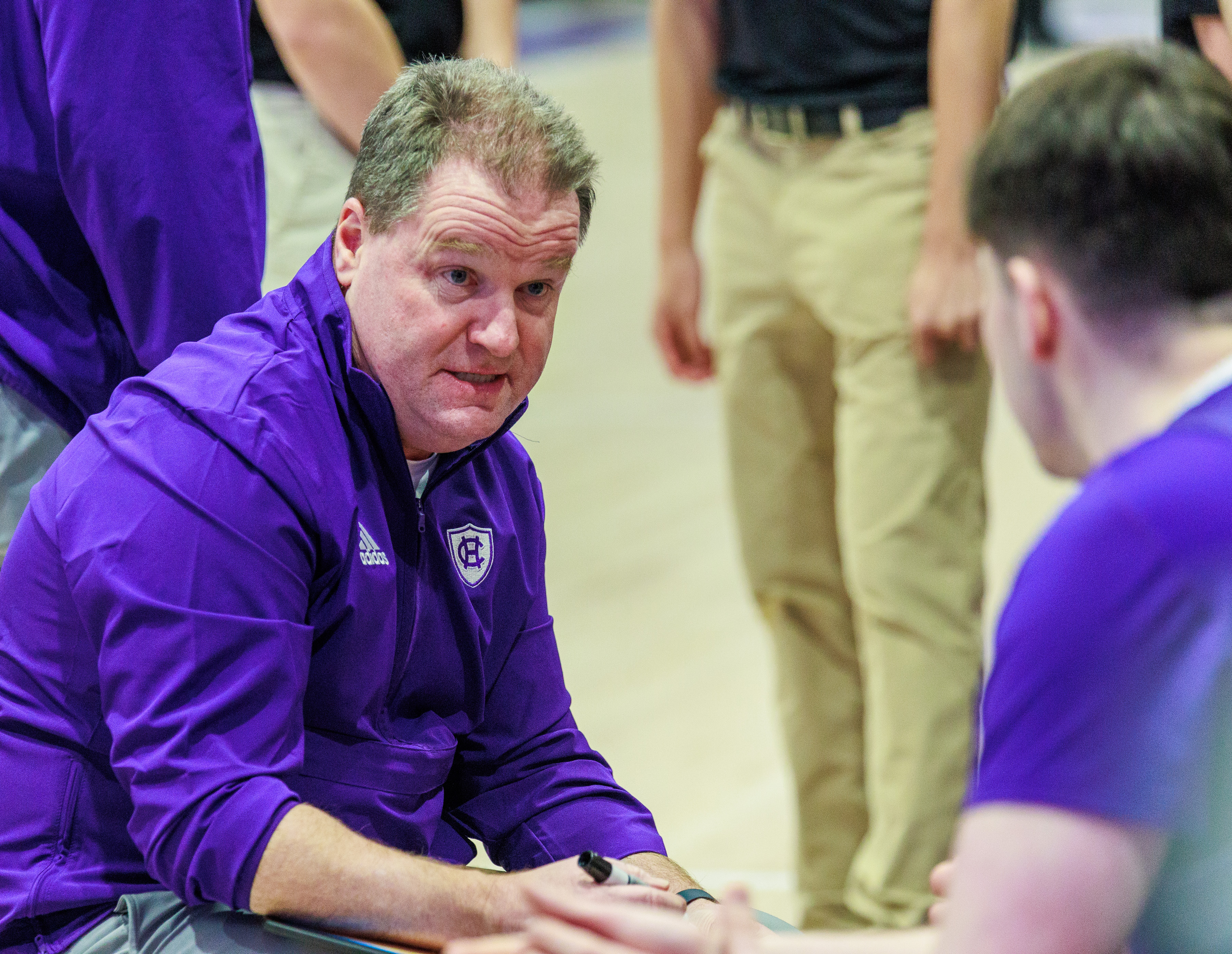
Coach Paulsen with a player

Record table
Season	Coach	Overall	Conference	Standing	Postseason
1900–01	None	6–6 .500)			
1901–02	Powers	4–5 .444)			
1902–03	Powers	6–5 .545)			
1903–04	Powers	10–2 .833)			
1904–05	Powers	6–4 .600)			
1905–06	Powers	12–3 .800)			
1907–08	Powers	12–6 .667)			
1908–09	Powers	4–8 .333)			
1920–21	Casey	2–0 1.000)			
1921–22	Casey	14–3 .824)			
1922–23	Casey	7–13 .350)			
1923–24	Casey	5–9 .357)			
1924–25	Simendinger	10–5 .667)			
1925–26	Reed	8–9 .471)			
1926–27	Reed	7–6 .538)			
1927–28	Reed	13–6 .684)			
1928–29	Reed	10–7 .588)			
1929–30	Reed	12–7 .632)			
1930–31	Reed	10–6 .625)			
1934–35	Riopel	3–12 .200)			
1939–40	Krause	2–3 .400)			
1940–41	Krause	4–7 .364)			
1941–42	Krause	5–4 .556)			
1942–43	Riopel	1–5 .167)			
1943–44	Riopel	6–8 .429)			
1944–45	Riopel	4–9 .308)			
1945–46	Julian	12–3 .800)			
1946-47	Julian	27–3 .900)			NCAA Champions
1947–48	Julian	26–4 .867)			NCAA Final Four
1948–49	Sheary	19–8 .704)			
1949–50	Sheary	27–4 .871)			NCAA Elite Eight
1950–51	Sheary	20–5 .800)			
1951–52	Sheary	24–4 .857)			NIT Quarterfinals
1952–53	Sheary	20–6 .769)			NCAA Elite Eight
1953–54	Sheary	26–2 .929)			NIT Champions
1954–55	Sheary	19–7 .731)			NIT Quarterfinals
1955–56	Leenig	22–5 .815)			NCAA First Round
1956–57	Leenig	12–12 .500)			
1957–58	Leenig	16–9 .640)			
1958–59	Leenig	14–11 .560)			
1959–60	Leenig	20–6 .769)			NIT First Round
1960–61	Leenig	22–5 .815)			NIT Semifinals
1961–62	Oftring	20–6 .769)			NIT Quarterfinals
1962–63	Oftring	16–9 .640)			
1963–64	Oftring	15–8 .652)			
1964–65	Oftring	13–10 .565)			
1965–66	Donohue	10–13 .435)			
1966–67	Donohue	16–9 .640)			
1967–68	Donohue	15–8 .652)			
1968–69	Donohue	16–8 .667)			
1969–70	Donohue	16–9 .640)			
1970–71	Donohue	18–8 .692)			
1971–72	Donohue	15–11 .577)			
1972–73	Blaney	9–17 .346)			
1973–74	Blaney	8–18 .308)			
1974–75	Blaney	20–8 .714)			NIT First Round
1975–76	Blaney	22–10 .688)			NIT Quarterfinals
1976–77	Blaney	23–6 .793)			NCAA First Round
1977–78	Blaney	20–7 .741)			
1978–79	Blaney	17–11 .607)			NIT First Round
1979–80	Blaney	19–11 .633)			NCAA First Round
1980–81	Blaney	20–10 .667)			NIT Second Round
1981–82	Blaney	16–11 .593)	4−4 .500)	5th	
1982–83	Blaney	17–13 .567)	5−3 .625)	3rd	
1983–84	Blaney	12–18 .400)	5−9 .357)	5th	
1984–85	Blaney	9–19 .321)	8−6 .571)	3rd	
1985–86	Blaney	12–18 .400)	6−8 .429)	6th	
1986–87	Blaney	9–19 .321)	6−8 .429)	6th	
1987–88	Blaney	14–15 .483)	8−6 .571)	4th	
1988–89	Blaney	13–15 .464)	5–9 .357)	6th	
1989–90	Blaney	24–6 .800)	14–2 .875)	1st	NIT First Round
1990–91	Blaney	18–12 .600)	8–4 .667)	3rd	
1991–92	Blaney	18–11 .621)	10–4 .714)	3rd	
1992–93	Blaney	23–7 .767)	12–2 .857)	2nd	NCAA First Round
1993–94	Blaney	14–14 .500)	9–5 .643)	1st	
1994–95	Raynor	15–12 .556)	9–5 .643)	4th	
1995–96	Raynor	17–12 .586)	8–4 .667)	3rd	
1996–97	Raynor	8–19 .296)	5–7 .417)	4th	
1997–98	Raynor	7–20 .259)	3–9 .250)	6th	
1998–99	Raynor	7–20 .259)	3–9 .250)	6th	
1999-00	Willard	10–18 .357)	3–9 .250)	5th	
2000–01	Willard	22–8 .733)	10–2 .833)	1st	NCAA First Round
2001–02	Willard	18–15 .545)	9–5 .643)	2nd	NCAA First Round
2002–03	Willard	26–5 .839)	13–1 .929)	1st	NCAA First Round
2003–04	Willard	13–15 .464)	7–7 .500)	5th	
2004–05	Willard	25–7 .781)	13–1 .929)	1st	NIT Second Round
2005–06	Willard	20–12 .625)	11–3 .786)	2nd	
2006–07	Willard	25–9 .735)	13–1 .929)	1st	NCAA First Round
2007–08	Willard	15–14 .517)	5–9 .357)	8th	
2008–09	Willard	18–14 .563)	11–3 .786)	2nd	
2009–10	Kearney	9–22 .290)	5–9 .357)	7th	
2010–11	Brown	8–21 .267)	7–7 .500)	3rd	
2011–12	Brown	15–14 .517)	9–5 .643)	4th	
2012–13	Brown	12–18 .400)	4–10 .286)	7th	
2013–14	Brown	20–14 .588)	12–6 .667)	3rd	CIT Second Round
2014–15	Brown	14–16 .467)	8–10 .444)	6th	
2015–16	Carmody	15–20 .429)	5–13 .278)	9th	NCAA First Round
2016–17	Carmody	15–17 .469)	9–9 .500)	5th	
2017–18	Carmody	12–19 .387)	8–10	6th	
2018–19	Carmody	16–17 .485)	6–12 .333)	10th	
2019–20	Nelson	3–29 .094)	2–16 .111)	10th	
2020–21	Nelson	5–11 .313)	5–11 .313)	8th	
2021–22	Nelson	9–22 .300)	7–11 .389)	7th	
2022–23	Nelson	10–22 .313)	7–11 .389)		
2023–24	Paulsen	0–0 –)	0–0 –)		
Total:		1446–1088 .571)			
National champion Postseason invitational champion Conference regular season champion Conference regular season and conference tournament champion Division regular season champion Division regular season and conference tournament champion Conference tournament champion

== Postseason ==
=== NCAA tournament results ===
The Crusaders have appeared in the NCAA tournament 13 times. Their combined record is 8–13. They were national champions in 1947.

Year	Seed	Round	Opponent	Result
1947		Elite Eight; Final Four; National Championship Game	Navy; CCNY; Oklahoma	W 55–47; W 60–45; W 58–47
1948		Elite Eight; Final Four; National 3rd Place Game	Michigan; Kentucky; Kansas State	W 63–45; L 52–60; W 60–54
1950		Elite Eight; Regional 3rd Place Game	NC State; Ohio State	L 74–87; L 52–72
1953		Round of 22; Sweet Sixteen; Elite Eight	Navy; Wake Forest; LSU	W 87–74; W 79–71; L 73–81
1956		Round of 25	Temple	L 72–74
1977		Round of 32	Michigan	L 81–86
1980	11	Round of 48	(6) Iona	L 78–84
1993	13	Round of 64	(4) Arkansas	L 64–94
2001	15	Round of 64	(2) Kentucky	L 68–72
2002	16	Round of 64	(1) Kansas	L 59–70
2003	14	Round of 64	(3) Marquette	L 68–72
2007	13	Round of 64	(4) Southern Illinois	L 51–61
2016	16	First Four; Round of 64	(16) Southern (1) Oregon	W 59–55; L 52–91

==== Men's NCAA Tournament Most Outstanding Player ====
- 1947 – George Kaftan

=== NIT results ===
The Crusaders have appeared in the National Invitation Tournament (NIT) 12 times. Their combined record is 11–11. They were NIT Champions in 1954.

Year	Round	Opponent	Result
1952	First Round; Quarterfinals	Seattle; Duquesne	W 77–72; L 68–78
1954	Quarterfinals; Semifinals; Championship Game	St. Francis (NY); Western Kentucky; Duquesne	W 93–69; W 75–69; W 71–62
1955	Quarterfinals	Saint Francis (PA)	L 64–68
1960	First Round	St. Bonaventure	L 81–94
1961	First Round; Quarterfinals; Semifinals; 3rd Place Game	Detroit Mercy; Memphis State; Providence; Dayton	W 86–82; W 81–69; L 83–90; W 85–67
1962	First Round; Quarterfinals	Colorado State; St. John's	W 72–71; L 74–80
1975	First Round	Princeton	L 63–84
1976	First Round; Quarterfinals	Saint Peter's; NC State	W 84–78; L 68–78
1979	First Round	Dayton	L 81–105
1981	First Round; Second Round	Southern Miss; Syracuse	W 56–54; L 57–77
1990	First Round	Rutgers	L 78–87
2005	First Round; Second Round	Notre Dame; Saint Joseph's	W 78–73; L 60–68

==== Men's National Invitation Tournament Most Valuable Player ====
- 1954 – Togo Palazzi

=== CIT results ===
The Crusaders have appeared in the CollegeInsider.com Postseason Tournament (CIT) one time. Their record is 1–1.

Year	Round	Opponent	Result
2014	First Round; Second Round	Brown; Yale	W 68–65; L 66–71

== Appearances in final national polls ==
Holy Cross has made 79 appearances in the AP Poll since it was introduced during the 1948–1949 season, peaking at No. 1 for five weeks in 1950. The college last appeared in the AP Poll during the 1977–1978 season. Holy Cross has finished the year ranked by the Helms Athletic Foundation in 1947 and in the final Associated Press poll of the season on six occasions:

Year	Ranking	Record
1947	1	27–3
1950	4	27–4
1952	13	24–4
1953	13	20–6
1954	3	26–2
1956	14	22–5
1960	16	20–6

== Honored jerseys ==
Note: As the college program stated, the jerseys were retired but not the "numbers" so other players can wear them:

Holy Cross Crusaders honored jerseys
No.	Player	Years	Ref.
12	George Kaftan	1945–1949	
15	Ron Perry	1976–1980	
17	Bob Cousy	1946–1950	
22	Togo Palazzi	1951–1954	
24	Tom Heinsohn	1953–1956	
32	Jack Foley	1959–1962	

== NBA players ==
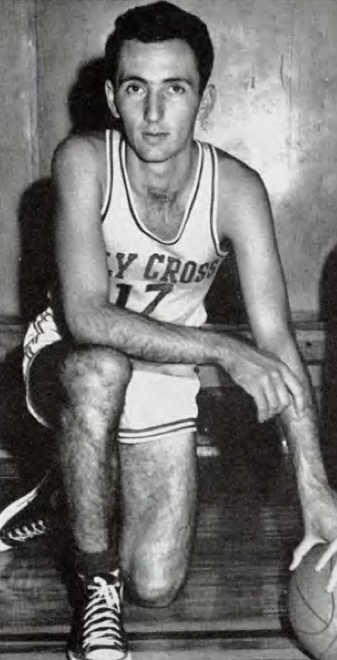
Bob Cousy

- George Blaney (1961–1962)
- Bob Cousy (1950–1963)
- Jack Foley (1962–1963)
- Tom Heinsohn (1956–1965)
- George Kaftan (1948–1953)
- Malcolm Miller (2011–2015)
- Joe Mullaney (1949–1950)
- Dermie O'Connell (1948–1950)
- Togo Palazzi (1954–1960)
- Kevin Stacom (1974–1982)
- Garry Witts (1981–1982)

== International players ==
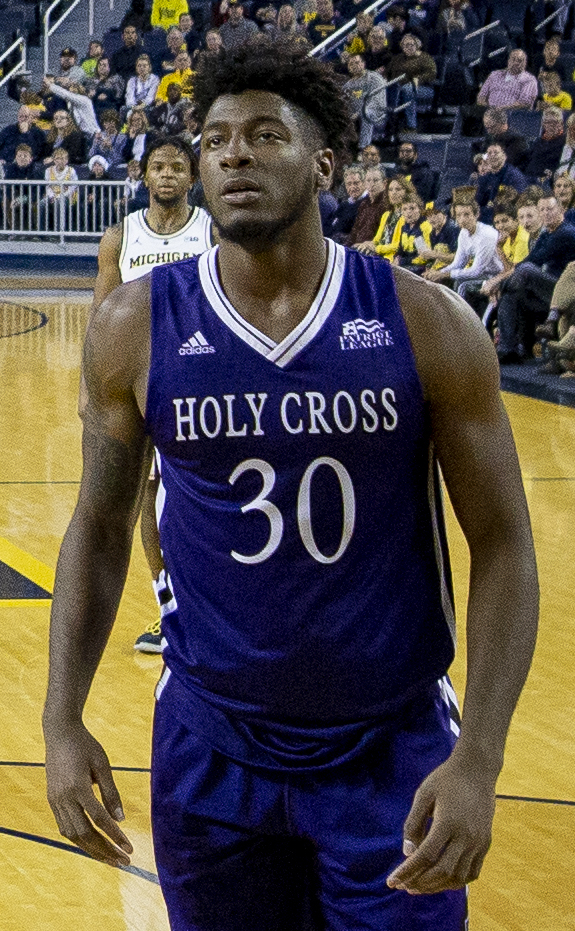
Jehyve Floyd

- Jehyve Floyd (born 1997), in the Israeli Basketball Premier League

== Awards ==
All-America

- 1947 – George Kaftan (Second Team)
- 1948 – George Kaftan (Second Team), Bob Cousy (Third Team)
- 1949 – Bob Cousy (Second Team)
- 1950 – Bob Cousy (First Team)
- 1953 – Togo Palazzi (Third Team)
- 1954 – Togo Palazzi (Third Team)
- 1955 – Tom Heinsohn (Third Team)
- 1956 – Tom Heinsohn (First Team)
- 1962 – Jack Foley (Second Team)
