= Kenneth Shugart =

American admiral (1925–1985)

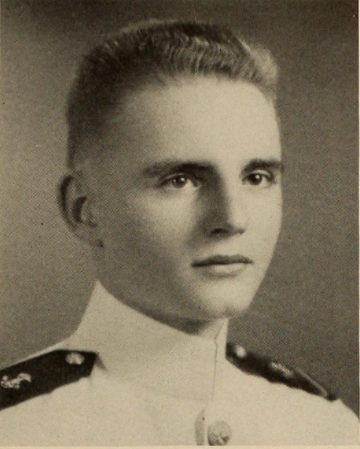
- Shugart as a senior at the Naval Academy, 1948

Personal information
- Born: November 3, 1925 Cheyenne, Wyoming, U.S.
- Died: June 19, 1985 (aged 59) Pensacola, Florida, U.S.
- Listed height: 5 ft 9 in (1.75 m)

Career information
- High school: Cheyenne (Cheyenne, Wyoming)
- College: Navy (1944–1947)
- BAA draft: 1947: undrafted
- Position: Shooting guard / small forward
- Number: 14

Career highlights
- Second-team All-American – Helms (1947)

Kenneth Laverne Shugart Jr. (November 11, 1925 – June 19, 1985) was a United States Navy rear admiral who served in two wars. Prior to his service, Shugart was an All-American college basketball player at the United States Naval Academy.

Shugart hailed from Cheyenne, Wyoming, and joined the coach Ben Carnevale and the Navy Midshipmen as a swingman after a successful three-sport athletic career at Cheyenne High School.

During the 1946–47 season, Shugart served as team captain and set academy scoring marks for a single-game (29 points) and a season (255), both since eclipsed. The Midshipmen also qualified for their first NCAA Tournament, losing to eventual champion Holy Cross in the first round. At the close of the season, Shugart was recognized as a second-team All-American by the Helms Athletic Foundation.

Following his graduation from the academy, Shugart became a highly decorated Naval pilot and commander, seeing action in both the Korean War and Vietnam War and earning four Distinguished Flying Cross medals, as well as several other military honors. He ultimately settled in Pensacola, Florida in 1979 where he first served as deputy Chief of the Naval Education and Training Command (CNET), ascending to the top spot two years later before retiring in 1983.

Shugart died on June 19, 1985, in his home in Pensacola.
