= Vadal Peterson =

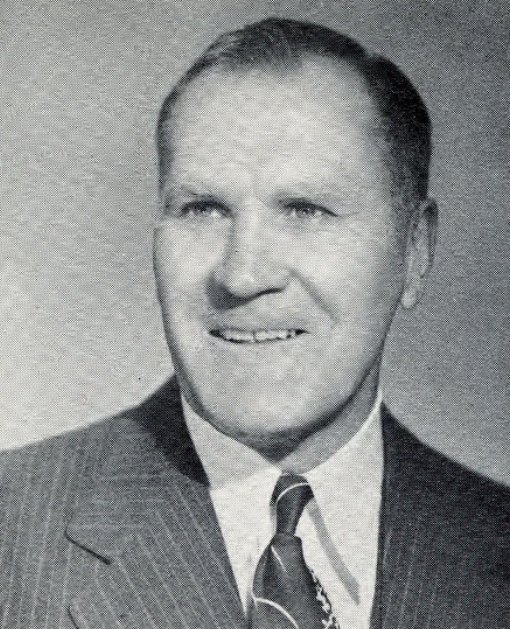
- Peterson from the 1952 Utonian

Biographical details
- Born: May 2, 1892; Huntsville, Utah, U.S.
- Died: September 1, 1976 (aged 84); Salt Lake City, Utah, U.S.
- Education: Utah State; Utah

Coaching career (HC unless noted)

Basketball
- 1927–1953: Utah

Baseball
- 1948: Utah

Head coaching record
- Overall: 385–230 (basketball); 1–3 (baseball)
- Tournaments: Basketball; 3–2 (NCAA); 3–2 (NIT)

Accomplishments and honors

Championships
- Basketball; NCAA (1944); NIT (1947); 5 MSC (1931, 1933, 1937, 1938, 1945)

Vadal Peterson (May 2, 1892 – September 1, 1976) was an American basketball coach with the distinction of coaching the most wins in University of Utah history. He guided Utah through 26 seasons from 1927 to 1953. He also led Utah to its only NCAA tournament title when the Utes defeated Dartmouth 42–40, in 1944. Peterson finished with a record of 385–230 (.626) while head coach of Utah and collected four Mountain States Conference championships and the 1947 National Invitation Tournament title.

== Head coaching record ==
=== Basketball ===
Record table
Season	Team	Overall	Conference	Standing	Postseason
Utah Utes (Mountain States Conference) (1927–1943)
1927–28	Utah	7–10	5–7	3rd	
1928–29	Utah	5–12	3–9	4th	
1929–30	Utah	15–12	4–8	4th	
1930–31	Utah	21–6	8–4	1st	
1931–32	Utah	14–9	8–4	2nd	
1932–33	Utah	13–8	9–3	T–1st	
1933–34	Utah	14–9	7–5	T–2nd	
1934–35	Utah	10–9	5–7	3rd	
1935–36	Utah	7–15	4–8	4th	
1936–37	Utah	17–7	7–5	T–1st	
1937–38	Utah	20–4	10–2	T–1st	
1938–39	Utah	13–7	7–5	T–3rd	
1939–40	Utah	19–4	8–4	2nd	
1940–41	Utah	14–7	9–3	2nd	
1941–42	Utah	13–7	7–5	4th	
1942–43	Utah	10–12	1–7	4th	
Utah Utes (Independent) (1943–1944)
1943–44	Utah	22–4			NCAA Champion, NIT quarterfinal
Utah Utes (Mountain States Conference) (1944–1953)
1944–45	Utah	17–4	8–0	1st	NCAA Regional Fourth Place
1945–46	Utah	12–8	8–4	3rd	
1946–47	Utah	19–5	10–2	2nd	NIT Champion
1947–48	Utah	11–9	6–4	T–2nd	
1948–49	Utah	24–8	14–6	2nd	NIT quarterfinal
1949–50	Utah	16–18	8–12	5th	
1950–51	Utah	23–13	12–8	3rd	
1951–52	Utah	19–9	8–6	4th	
1952–53	Utah	10–14	5–9	T–5th	
Utah:		385–230 (.626)	177–137 (.564)		
Total:		385–230 (.626)			
National champion Postseason invitational champion Conference regular season champion Conference regular season and conference tournament champion Division regular season champion Division regular season and conference tournament champion Conference tournament champion

== See also ==
- List of NCAA Division I Men's Final Four appearances by coach
