= 1945–46 Holy Cross Crusaders men's basketball team =

American college basketball season

1945–46 Holy Cross Crusaders men's basketball
- Conference: Independent
- Record: 12–3
- Head coach: Alvin Julian (1st season)
- Captain: none
- Home arena: N/A

The 1945–46 Holy Cross Crusaders men's basketball team represented The College of the Holy Cross during the 1944–45 NCAA men's basketball season. The head coach was Alvin Julian, coaching the crusaders in his first season. The team finished with an overall record of 12–3.

== Schedule ==
Date time, TV	Opponent	Result	Record	Site city, state
12/08/1945*	vs. C.C.N.Y.	W 45–35	1–0	Madison Square Garden; New York, NY
12/13/1945*	vs. Lowell Hospital	W 64–54	2–0	Fort Devens, MA
12/21/1945*	vs. Dartmouth	W 60–44	3–0	Boston Garden; Boston, MA
1/10/1946*	vs. Bowling Green	W 69–63	4–0	Boston Garden; Boston, MA
1/12/1946*	at Harvard	W 47–42	5–0	Malkin Athletic Center; Boston, MA
1/17/1946*	vs. Boston College	W 47–42	6–0	Boston Garden; Boston, MA
1/19/1946*	vs. Coast Guard	W 36–31	7–0	New London, CT
1/24/1946*	at Rhode Island	L 58–65	7–1	Boston Garden; Boston, MA
1/26/1946*	at Tufts	W 76–53	8–1	Medford, MA
1/31/1946*	vs. Temple	W 53–47	9–1	Boston Garden; Boston, MA
2/02/1946*	at Brown	W 57–51	10–1	Marvel Gymnasium; Providence, RI
2/07/1946*	vs. Valparaiso	L 62–73	10–2	Boston Garden; Boston, MA
2/09/1946*	at Yale	L 45–58	10–3	Payne Whitney Gymnasium; New Haven, CT
2/14/1946*	vs. Boston College	W 62–42	11–3	Boston Garden; Boston, MA
3/09/1946*	vs. Merchant Marines	W 61–50	12–3	Jamaica N.Y. Armory; Jamaica, NY
*Non-conference game. (#) Tournament seedings in parentheses.
