= 1947 SEC men's basketball tournament =

- Classification: Division I
- Teams: 12
- Site: Jefferson County Armory; Louisville, Kentucky
- Champions: Kentucky (9th title)
- Winning coach: Adolph Rupp (9th title)

1946–47 Southeastern Conference men's basketball standings
	Conf.				Overall
Team	W		L	PCT	W		L	PCT
Kentucky †	11	–	0	1.000	34	–	3	.919
LSU	9	–	2	.818	17	–	4	.810
Tennessee	10	–	3	.769	16	–	5	.762
Alabama	13	–	5	.722	16	–	6	.727
Tulane	8	–	4	.667	22	–	9	.710
Georgia Tech	6	–	6	.500	12	–	11	.522
Florida	4	–	4	.500	17	–	9	.654
Vanderbilt	4	–	7	.364	7	–	8	.467
Mississippi State	4	–	9	.308	10	–	11	.476
Georgia	4	–	9	.308	5	–	14	.263
Ole Miss	2	–	11	.154	7	–	14	.333
Auburn	1	–	15	.063	3	–	18	.143
† Regular-season championship and SEC Tournament winner

The 1947 Southeastern Conference men's basketball tournament took place on February 27–March 1, 1947, in Louisville, Kentucky at the Jefferson County Armory. It was the fourteenth SEC basketball tournament.

Kentucky won the tournament by beating Tulane in the championship game. The Wildcats would go on to play in the 1947 National Invitation Tournament, losing to Utah in the championship game.

== Bracket ==
First Round
Tennessee	58
Georgia	45
LSU	61
Ole Miss	36
Georgia Tech	65
Mississippi State	52
Kentucky	98
Vanderbilt	29

Quarterfinals
Tennessee	41
Tulane	47
Florida	45
LSU	60
Alabama	40
Georgia Tech	43
Auburn	18
Kentucky	84

Semifinals
Tulane	63
LSU	50
Georgia Tech	53
Kentucky	75

Finals
Tulane	38
Kentucky	55
