= 1946–47 Georgia Bulldogs basketball team =

American college basketball season

1946–47 Georgia Bulldogs basketball
- Conference: Southeastern Conference
- Record: 5–14 (4–9 SEC)
- Head coach: Ralph Jordan (1st season)
- Captain: Arnold de la Perriere
- Home arena: Woodruff Hall

1946–47 Southeastern Conference men's basketball standings
	Conf.				Overall
Team	W		L	PCT	W		L	PCT
Kentucky †	11	–	0	1.000	34	–	3	.919
LSU	9	–	2	.818	17	–	4	.810
Tennessee	10	–	3	.769	16	–	5	.762
Alabama	13	–	5	.722	16	–	6	.727
Tulane	8	–	4	.667	22	–	9	.710
Georgia Tech	6	–	6	.500	12	–	11	.522
Florida	4	–	4	.500	17	–	9	.654
Vanderbilt	4	–	7	.364	7	–	8	.467
Mississippi State	4	–	9	.308	10	–	11	.476
Georgia	4	–	9	.308	5	–	14	.263
Ole Miss	2	–	11	.154	7	–	14	.333
Auburn	1	–	15	.063	3	–	18	.143
† Regular-season championship and SEC Tournament winner

The 1946–47 Georgia Bulldogs basketball team represented the University of Georgia as a member of the Southeastern Conference (SEC) during the 1946–47 NCAA men's basketball season. Led by first-year head coach Ralph Jordan, the Bulldogs compiled an overall record of 5–14 with a mark of 4–9 conference play, tying for ninth place in the SEC. The team captain was Arnold de la Perriere.

== Schedule ==
Date time, TV	Opponent	Result	Record	Site city, state
12/5/1946	at St. Johns	L 43-66	0–1	
12/7/1946	at U. of Niagara	L 51-59	0–2	
12/12/1946	Chattanooga	W 55-32	1–2	Athens, GA
1/6/1947	at Mississippi	W 46-38	2–2	
1/7/1947	at Alabama	L 27-48	2–3	
1/10/1947	South Carolina	L 50-55	2–4	Athens, GA
1/13/1947	at Florida	L 47-50	2–5	
1/18/1947	Alabama	L 45-53	2–6	Athens, GA
1/21/1947	Kentucky	L 45-84	2–7	Athens, GA
1/25/1947	at Auburn	W 44-40	3–7	
1/27/1947	Tennessee	L 33-48	3–8	Athens, GA
2/4/1947	Georgia Tech	L 44-51	3–9	Athens, GA
2/8/1947	at Tennessee	L 33-62	3–10	
2/10/1947	at Kentucky	L 40-81	3–11	
2/14/1947	Florida	W 59-43	4–11	Athens, GA
2/16/1947	at South Carolina	L 40-51	4–12	
2/19/1947	at Georgia Tech	L 46-70	4–13	
2/22/1947	Auburn	W 60-45	5–13	Athens, GA
2/27/1947	Tennessee	L 45-58	5–14	Athens, GA
*Non-conference game. (#) Tournament seedings in parentheses.
