= 1946–47 Kansas Jayhawks men's basketball team =

American college basketball season

1946–47 Kansas Jayhawks men's basketball
- Conference: Big Six Conference
- Record: 16–11 (5–5 Big 6)
- Head coach: Phog Allen (30th season)
- Assistant coach: Howard Engleman (1st season)
- Captain: Charles B. Black
- Home arena: Hoch Auditorium

1946–47 Big Six Conference men's basketball standings
	Conf.				Overall
Team	W		L	PCT	W		L	PCT
Oklahoma	8	–	2	.800	24	–	7	.774
Missouri	6	–	4	.600	15	–	10	.600
Kansas	5	–	5	.500	16	–	11	.593
Iowa State	5	–	5	.500	7	–	14	.333
Kansas State	3	–	7	.300	14	–	10	.583
Nebraska	3	–	7	.300	10	–	14	.417

The 1946–47 Kansas Jayhawks men's basketball team represented the University of Kansas during the 1946–47 college men's basketball season.

== Roster ==
- Otto Schnellbacher
- Charles B. Black
- Ray Evans
- Owen Peck
- Don Auten
- Wendell Clark
- Gilbert Stramel
- Clifford King
- Jack Eskridge
- Claude Houchin
- William Sapp
- Charles Penny
- Harold England

== Schedule ==
Date time, TV	Rank^{#}	Opponent^{#}	Result	Record	Site city, state
December 7*		at Emporia State	W 48–42	1-0	William L. White Auditorium; Emporia, KS
December 11*		Idaho	W 42–28	2-0	Hoch Auditorium; Lawrence, KS
December 12*		vs. Iowa State	W 55–36	3-0	Municipal Auditorium; Kansas City, MO
December 13*		vs. Arkansas	W 53–52	4-0	Municipal Auditorium; Kansas City, MO
December 14*		vs. SMU	L 46–49	4-1	Municipal Auditorium; Kansas City, MO
December 17*		at Saint Louis	W 49–35	5-1	Kiel Auditorium; St. Louis, MO
December 20*		vs. Oklahoma A&M	L 37–47	5-2	Municipal Auditorium; Kansas City, MO
December 26*		vs. Tulane; All-College Tournament	W 65–53	6-2	Municipal Auditorium; Oklahoma City, OK
December 27*		vs. Oklahoma; All-College Tournament	W 51–45	7-2	Municipal Auditorium; Oklahoma City, OK
December 28*		vs. Oklahoma A&M; All-College Tournament	L 39–42	7-3	Municipal Auditorium; Oklahoma City, OK
December 30*		vs. Stanford	W 54–52	8-3	Municipal Auditorium; Kansas City, MO
January 2*		vs. Colorado	L 50–52	8-4	Municipal Auditorium; Kansas City, MO
January 7		Missouri; Border War	L 34–39	8-5 (0-1)	Hoch Auditorium; Lawrence, KS
January 10		at Oklahoma	L 47–50	8-6	Field House; Norman, OK
January 14		at Nebraska	L 46–48	8-7 (0-2)	Nebraska Coliseum; Lincoln, NE
January 20*		at Colorado	L 54–59	8-8 (0-3)	Balch Fieldhouse; Boulder, CO
January 24		Iowa State	W 55–30	9-8 (1-3)	Hoch Auditorium; Lawrence, KS
January 28		Kansas State; Sunflower Showdown	W 50–39	10-8 (2-3)	Hoch Auditorium; Lawrence, KS
February 11*		at Oklahoma A&M	L 31–33	10-9	Gallagher-Iba Arena; Stillwater, OK
February 15		Nebraska	W 69–37	11-9 (3-3)	Hoch Auditorium; Lawrence, KS
February 20		at Kansas State; Sunflower Showdown	L 45–48	11-10 (3-4)	Nichols Hall; Manhattan, KS
February 22*		at DePaul	W 58–41	12-10	University Auditorium; Chicago, IL
February 24*		Oklahoma A&M	W 37–34	13-10	Hoch Auditorium; Lawrence, KS
February 28		at Iowa State	L 44–56	13-11 (3-5)	The Armory; Ames, IA
March 4		Oklahoma	W 38–36	14-11 (4-5)	Hoch Auditorium; Lawrence, KS
March 7		Missouri; Border War	W 48–38	15-11 (5-5)	Brewer Fieldhouse; Columbia, MO
March 14*		Colorado	W 51–39	16-11	Hoch Auditorium; Lawrence, KS
*Non-conference game. ^{#}Rankings from AP Poll. (#) Tournament seedings in parentheses.
