= 1946–47 Oklahoma Sooners men's basketball team =

American college basketball season

1946–47 Oklahoma Sooners men's basketball

NCAA tournament, Runner-up Big Six Conference Champion

National Championship Game, L 47–58 vs. Holy Cross
- Conference: Big Six Conference
- Record: 24–7 (8–2 Big Six)
- Head coach: Bruce Drake (9th season)
- Home arena: McCasland Field House

1946–47 Big Six Conference men's basketball standings
	Conf.				Overall
Team	W		L	PCT	W		L	PCT
Oklahoma	8	–	2	.800	24	–	7	.774
Missouri	6	–	4	.600	15	–	10	.600
Kansas	5	–	5	.500	16	–	11	.593
Iowa State	5	–	5	.500	7	–	14	.333
Kansas State	3	–	7	.300	14	–	10	.583
Nebraska	3	–	7	.300	10	–	14	.417

The 1946–47 Oklahoma Sooners men's basketball team represented the University of Oklahoma in college basketball during the 1946–47 NCAA men's basketball season. The Oklahoma Sooners men's basketball team were a member of the National Collegiate Athletic Association's (NCAA) Big Six Conference. The team was led by Bruce Drake in his ninth season as head coach of the Sooners. Oklahoma posted a 24–7 overall record and an 8–2 conference record to finish with the Big Six Conference title. The Sooners advanced to the 1947 NCAA basketball tournament and lost to Holy Cross, 58–47, in the national title game.

== Schedule ==
Date time, TV	Rank^{#}	Opponent^{#}	Result	Record	Site city, state
Regular season
December 2, 1946*		Central Missouri State	W 49–21	1–0	McCasland Field House; Norman, OK
December 4, 1946*		Texas Tech	W 60–37	2–0	McCasland Field House; Norman, OK
December 6, 1946*		at TCU	W 76–54	3–0	TCU Fieldhouse; Fort Worth, TX
December 7, 1946*		at SMU	W 66–41	4–0	Perkins Gymnasium; Dallas, TX
December 12, 1946*		vs. Kansas State; Big Six Holiday Tournament	L 55–59	4–1	Municipal Auditorium; Kansas City, MO
December 13, 1946*		vs. Missouri; Big Six Holiday Tournament	W 61–53	5–1	Municipal Auditorium; Kansas City, MO
December 14, 1946*		vs. Nebraska; Big Six Holiday Tournament	W 63–53	6–1	Municipal Auditorium; Kansas City, MO
December 18, 1946*		at Wisconsin	W 56–40	7–1	Wisconsin Field House; Madison, WI
December 26, 1946*		vs. Baylor; All-College Basketball Classic	W 64–47	8–1	Oklahoma City, OK
December 27, 1946*		vs. Kansas; All-College Basketball Classic	L 45–51	8–2	Oklahoma City, OK
December 28, 1946*		Texas; All-College Basketball Classic	L 50–62	8–3	Oklahoma City, OK
January 1, 1947*		at CCNY	W 55–52	9–3	New York, NY
January 4, 1947*		at Bradley	W 65–54	10–3	Peoria Armory; Peoria, IL
January 6, 1947		at Nebraska	L 41–44	10–4 (0–1)	Nebraska Coliseum; Lincoln, NE
January 10, 1947		Kansas	W 50–47	11–4 (1–1)	McCasland Field House; Norman, OK
January 18, 1947		at Kansas State	W 50–30	12–4 (2–1)	Nichols Hall; Manhattan, KS
January 25, 1947		Missouri	W 57–43	13–4 (3–1)	McCasland Field House; Norman, OK
January 28, 1947*		Oklahoma A&M	L 42–47 ^{OT}	13–5	McCasland Field House; Norman, OK
February 1, 1947		Iowa State	W 54–40	14–5 (4–1)	McCasland Field House; Norman, OK
February 3, 1947*		TCU	W 75–34	15–5	McCasland Field House; Norman, OK
February 7, 1947*		Denver	W 45–32	16–5	McCasland Field House; Norman, OK
February 14, 1947		Kansas State	W 57–38	17–5 (5–1)	McCasland Field House; Norman, OK
February 17, 1947		Nebraska	W 63–49	18–5 (6–1)	McCasland Field House; Norman, OK
February 21, 1947		at Iowa State	W 46–45	19–5 (7–1)	Iowa State Armory; Ames, IA
February 27, 1947		at Missouri	W 42–36	20–5 (8–1)	Brewer Fieldhouse; Columbia, MO
March 4, 1947		at Kansas	L 36–38	20–6 (8–2)	Hoch Auditorium; Lawrence, KS
March 11, 1947*		at Oklahoma A&M	W 48–41	21–6	Gallagher Hall; Stillwater, OK
March 18, 1947*		vs. Saint Louis; NCAA regional playoff	W 47–41	22–6	Municipal Auditorium; Kansas City, MO
NCAA tournament
March 21, 1947*		vs. Oregon State; Regional Semifinal, Elite Eight	W 56–54	23–6	Municipal Auditorium; Kansas City, MO
March 22, 1947*		vs. Texas; Regional Final, Final Four	W 55–54	24–6	Municipal Auditorium; Kansas City, MO
March 25, 1947*		vs. Holy Cross; National Championship	L 47–58	24–7	Madison Square Garden; New York, NY
*Non-conference game. ^{#}Rankings from AP Poll. (#) Tournament seedings in parentheses.
