= Dave Humerickhouse =

American basketball player (1924–2007)

Personal information
- Born: August 10, 1924 Hunter, Illinois, U.S.
- Died: September 14, 2007 (aged 83) Peoria, Illinois, U.S.
- Listed height: 6 ft 2 in (1.88 m)

Career information
- High school: Paris (Paris, Illinois)
- College: Bradley (1946–1950)
- NBA draft: 1950: undrafted
- Position: Guard

Career highlights
- Second-team All-American – Helms (1947)

David D. Humerickhouse (August 10, 1924 – September 14, 2007) was an American basketball player, known for his All-American college career at Bradley University.

Humerickhouse was a star high school player at Paris High School and was the first player in Illinois high school history to play in four state tournaments, winning a championship as a senior in 1943. He then enlisted in the United States Marine Corps to fight in World War II. He matured playing for service teams at his base in San Diego and on an aircraft carrier in the South Pacific before matriculating at Bradley in 1946 as a 22-year-old freshman. This maturity paid off, as he was named a second-team All-American by the Helms Athletic Foundation in 1947.

He was again an All-American as a sophomore, earning honorable mention honors from the Associated Press. His playing time diminished in his senior season.

Following for the close of his college career, Humerickhouse became a carpenter. He died on September 14, 2007, in Peoria, Illinois, at age 83.
