= Jim Homer =

American basketball player and coach

Personal information
- Born: December 5, 1921 Columbus, Georgia, U.S.
- Died: October 15, 1992 (aged 70) Livingston, Alabama, U.S.
- Listed height: 6 ft 5 in (1.96 m)

Career information
- High school: Columbus (Columbus, Georgia)
- College: Alabama (1940–1943, 1946–1947)
- Playing career: 1947–1949
- Position: Power forward / center
- Coaching career: 1949–1956

Career history

Playing
- 1947–1949: Syracuse Nationals

Coaching
- 1949–1956: West Alabama

Career highlights
- Third-team All-American – Helms (1947)

James Powell Homer (December 5, 1921 – October 15, 1992) was an American basketball player and coach. He played two seasons for the Syracuse Nationals of the American National Basketball League. He was an All-American college player at the University of Alabama and coached at the college level following his playing career.

Homer went to Alabama from Columbus High School in Columbus, Georgia. In his junior season of 1942–43, Homer finished second in the Southeastern Conference (SEC) scoring race to Tulane’s Bob Duffy.

After serving for three years with the United States Navy in World War II, in Homer returned to the Tide for the 1946–47 season. For the season, Homer set a new SEC scoring record (since broken) with 268 points. He was named a third-team All-American by the Helms Athletic Foundation at the close of the season.

Homer moved to the Syracuse Nationals of the NBL after the close of his college career. In two seasons with the Nats, he averaged 9.4 points over 115 games.

Following the close of his professional career, he was named head basketball coach at Livingston State College (now the University of West Alabama). He also served as head baseball coach, was an assistant football coach, and continued as the school's athletic director after his coaching career.
