= 1946–47 Holy Cross Crusaders men's basketball team =

American college basketball season

1946–47 Holy Cross Crusaders men's basketball

NCAA tournament National champions

National Championship Game, W 58–47 vs. Oklahoma
- Conference: Independent

Ranking
- Coaches: No. N/A
- AP: No. N/A
- Record: 27–3
- Head coach: Alvin "Doggie" Julian
- Assistant coach: Hop Riopel

The 1946–47 Holy Cross Crusaders men's basketball team represented the College of the Holy Cross, located in Worcester, Massachusetts, in NCAA competition in the 1946–47 season. The Crusaders, behind coach Alvin "Doggie" Julian, NCAA tournament MVP George Kaftan, star Joe Mullaney and a freshman point guard named Bob Cousy, beat Oklahoma at Madison Square Garden to win the NCAA championship.

The Crusaders, who played their home games at Boston Garden and the South High Community School in Worcester, Massachusetts, won their first four games of 1946–47, tripped through a three-game losing streak, then finished the year with 23 straight victories.

The team entered the NCAA Division I men's basketball tournament as the last seed in the 8-team tournament. In the first match, Holy Cross defeated the United States Naval Academy in front of a sold-out crowd at Madison Square Garden by a score of 55–47. Mullaney led the team in scoring with 18 points, mostly in part to Navy coach Ben Carnevale's decision to have his players back off from Mullaney, who was reputed as being more of a playmaker than a shooter. In the semi-final match, Holy Cross faced the City College of New York (CCNY), coached by Nat Holman, one of the game's earliest innovators. The Crusaders, led by Kaftan's 30-point game, easily defeated the Beavers 60–45. In the championship game, Holy Cross faced the University of Oklahoma, behind coach Bruce Drake, in another sold-out game at Madison Square Garden. Kaftan followed up the semi-final match with 18 points in the title game, leading the Crusaders to a 58–47 victory against the Sooners.

Holy Cross became the first school from the New England area, as well as the state of Massachusetts, to win a national college basketball title. The Crusaders finished the 1947 season with 23 straight wins. Afterward, 35,000 people watched a parade in the team's honor on Holy Cross Day in Worcester. Future NBA legend Cousy was named AP and UP player of the year, and George Kaftan was voted to the all-decade team of the 1940s by the NCAA in 1989.

== NCAA tournament results ==
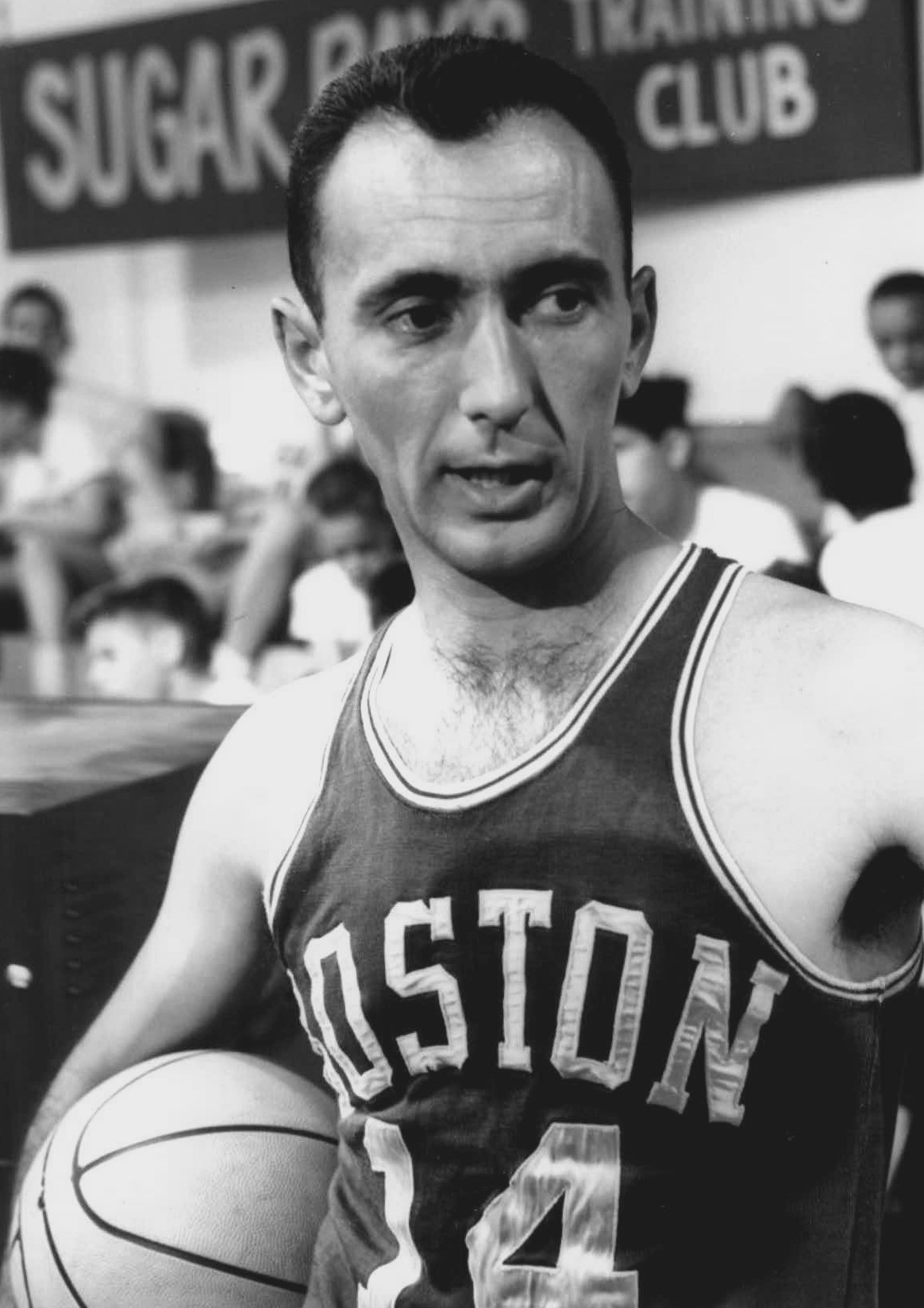
Future NBA legend Bob Cousy was a freshman point guard on Holy Cross

Quarterfinals
Holy Cross	55
Navy	47
CCNY	70
Wisconsin	56
Texas	42
Wyoming	40
Oklahoma	56
Oregon State	54

Semifinals
Holy Cross	60
CCNY	45
Texas	54
Oklahoma	55

Finals
Holy Cross	58
Oklahoma	47
Third place
CCNY	50
Texas	54

== Awards and honors ==
- George Kaftan
  - NCAA basketball tournament Most Outstanding Player (MOP)
  - Consensus Second Team All-American
