= 1946–47 Iowa State Cyclones men's basketball team =

American college basketball season

1946–47 Iowa State Cyclones men's basketball
- Conference: Big Six Conference
- Record: 7–14 (5–5 Big Six)
- Head coach: Louis Menze (19th season)
- Home arena: Iowa State Armory

1946–47 Big Six Conference men's basketball standings
	Conf.				Overall
Team	W		L	PCT	W		L	PCT
Oklahoma	8	–	2	.800	24	–	7	.774
Missouri	6	–	4	.600	15	–	10	.600
Kansas	5	–	5	.500	16	–	11	.593
Iowa State	5	–	5	.500	7	–	14	.333
Kansas State	3	–	7	.300	14	–	10	.583
Nebraska	3	–	7	.300	10	–	14	.417

The 1946–47 Iowa State Cyclones men's basketball team represented Iowa State University during the 1946–47 NCAA men's basketball season. The Cyclones were coached by Louis Menze, who was in his nineteenth and final season with the Cyclones. They played their home games for the first time at the Iowa State Armory in Ames, Iowa.

They finished the season 7–14, 5–5 in Big Six play to finish tied for third place. They also finished in last place in the inaugural Big Six Holiday Tournament.

== Roster ==
1946–47 Iowa State Cyclones men's basketball team
Players
Coaches

Pos.	#	Name	Height	Weight	Year	Hometown
		Ed Anderson	—	—		La Grange, Illinois
		Gay Anderson	—	—		Council Bluffs, Iowa
G		Bill Block	—	—		Muscatine, Iowa
F		Jim Buck	—	—		Ames, Iowa
		Don Ferguson	—	—		Ottumwa, Iowa
G		Charles Gradoville	—	—		Des Moines, Iowa
C		Jim Jessen	—	—		Everly, Iowa
G		Lloyd Kester	—	—		Ames, Iowa
F		Rollin Kuebler	—	—	Jr	Carroll, Iowa
		Bob McLuen	—	—		Ashton, Iowa
F		Jim Myers	—	—	Sr	Sioux City, Iowa
		Dean Norman	—	—		Fairfield, Iowa
G		Ron Norman	—	—		Fairfield, Iowa
		Don Paulsen	6 ft 5 in (1.96 m)	200 lb (91 kg)	Fr	Huxley, Iowa
		Therol Peterson	—	—		Clinton, Iowa
		Harland Platte	—	—		Waverly, Iowa
		Dick Pownall	—	—		Centerville, Iowa
C		Leo Schneider	—	—		Rock Island, Illinois
G		John Sheperd	—	—		Gary, Indiana
		Norman Smith	—	—		Chicago
		Jim Van Deusen	—	—		Iowa City, Iowa
F		Ray Wehde (C)	—	—	Jr	Holstein, Iowa
F		Roy Wehde	—	—		Holstein, Iowa
		John Wroan	—	—		Deer Creek, Illinois

Head coach

- Louis Menze

Assistant coach(es)

Legend

- (C) Team captain
- (S) Suspended
- (I) Ineligible
- (W) Walk-on
- Injured
- Current redshirt

== Schedule and results ==
Date time, TV	Rank^{#}	Opponent^{#}	Result	Record	Site city, state
Regular season
December 2, 1946*; 7:30 pm		Grinnell	W 56–28	1–0	Iowa State Armory; Ames, Iowa
December 9, 1946*; 7:30 pm		Iowa State Teacher's College; Iowa Big Four	W 47–36	2–0	Iowa State Armory; Ames, Iowa
December 12, 1946*; 9:30 pm		Kansas; Big Six Holiday Tournament Quarterfinals	L 36–55	2–1	Municipal Auditorium; Kansas City, Missouri
December 13, 1946*; 2:00 pm		Nebraska; Big Six Holiday Tournament Consolation Semifinals	L 51–54	2–2	Municipal Auditorium; Kansas City, Missouri
December 14, 1946*; 2:00 pm		Missouri; Big Six Holiday Tournament Seventh Place	L 55–56	2–3	Municipal Auditorium; Kansas City, Missouri
December 21, 1946*; 7:30 pm		Minnesota	L 41–51	2–4	Iowa State Armory; Ames, Iowa
December 27, 1946*; 7:30 pm		Michigan	L 37–58	2–5	Iowa State Armory (4,000); Ames, Iowa
December 28, 1946*; 7:45 pm		Michigan	L 27–38	2–6	Iowa State Armory; Ames, Iowa
December 31, 1946*; 7:30 pm		Drake; Iowa Big Four	L 34–35	2–7	Iowa State Armory; Ames, Iowa
January 3, 1947		at Missouri	L 25–36	2–8 (0–1)	Brewer Fieldhouse; Columbia, Missouri
January 7, 1947*; 8:15 pm		at Drake; Iowa Big Four	L 38–41	2–9	Drake Fieldhouse; Des Moines, Iowa
January 10, 1947; 7:30 pm		Kansas State	W 51–40	3–9 (1–1)	Iowa State Armory; Ames, Iowa
January 13, 1947*		at Bradley	L 49–51	3–10	Peoria Armory; Peoria, Illinois
January 20, 1947; 7:30 pm		Nebraska	W 61–44	4–10 (2–1)	Iowa State Armory; Ames, Iowa
January 24, 1947		at Kansas	L 30–55	4–11 (2–2)	Hoch Auditorium; Lawrence, Kansas
February 1, 1947; 8:00 pm		at Oklahoma	L 40–54	4–12 (2–3)	OU Field House; Norman, Oklahoma
February 3, 1947		at Kansas State	L 30–43	4–13 (2–4)	Nichols Hall; Manhattan, Kansas
February 10, 1947; 8:00 pm		at Nebraska	W 56–54	5–13 (3–4)	Nebraska Coliseum; Lincoln, Nebraska
February 14, 1947; 7:30 pm		Missouri	W 54–52	6–13 (4–4)	Iowa State Armory; Ames, Iowa
February 21, 1947; 7:30 pm		Oklahoma	L 45–46	6–14 (4–5)	Iowa State Armory; Ames, Iowa
February 28, 1947; 7:30 pm		Kansas	W 56–44	7–14 (5–5)	Iowa State Armory; Ames, Iowa
*Non-conference game. ^{#}Rankings from AP poll. (#) Tournament seedings in parentheses. All times are in Central Time.
