= Doggie Julian =

American sports player and coach (1901–1967)

- Julian pictured in The Ciarla, 1939, Muhlenberg College yearbook

Biographical details
- Born: April 5, 1901; Reading, Pennsylvania, U.S.
- Died: July 28, 1967 (aged 66); White River Junction, Vermont, U.S.

Playing career

Football
- 1920–1922: Bucknell
- 1924: Pottsville Maroons

Basketball
- 1921–1922: Bucknell

Baseball
- 1922–1923: Bucknell
- 1923: Reading Keystones
- 1924: Harrisburg Senators
- 1924–1925: York White Roses
- 1926: Chambersburg Maroons
- 1926: Lawrence Merry Macks
- Positions: End (football); Catcher (baseball)

Coaching career (HC unless noted)

Basketball
- 1936–1945: Muhlenberg
- 1945–1948: Holy Cross
- 1948–1950: Boston Celtics
- 1950–1967: Dartmouth

Football
- 1925–1928: Schuylkill
- 1929–1930: Albright
- 1933–1935: Ashland HS (PA)
- 1936–1944: Muhlenberg

Baseball
- 1942–1944: Muhlenberg

Head coaching record
- Overall: 379–332 (college basketball); 16–18 (college baseball); 47–81 (BAA/NBA); 77–63–3 (college football); 30–4 (high school football)
- Tournaments: Basketball; 7–3 (NCAA); 0–2 (NIT)

Accomplishments and honors

Championships
- Basketball; NCAA (1947); 3 Ivy (1956, 1958, 1959); Football; 3 Eastern Pennsylvania Collegiate (1939, 1941–1942); PIAA (1935)
- Basketball Hall of Fame; Inducted in 1968 (profile)
- College Basketball Hall of Fame; Inducted in 2006

Alvin Fred "Doggie" Julian (April 5, 1901 – July 28, 1967) was an American college football coach, a college basketball player and coach, and a National Basketball Association (NBA) coach.

== Early life and education ==
Julian was born in Reading, Pennsylvania. He attended Bucknell University, where he lettered in football, basketball, and baseball, and from which he graduated in 1923

== Career ==
=== Playing career ===
From 1923 to 1926, Julian played minor league baseball with a number of clubs: the Reading Keystones, the Harrisburg Senators, the York White Roses, the Chambersburg Maroons, and the Lawrence Merry Macks.

=== Coaching career ===
Julian served as the head college basketball coach at Muhlenberg College in Allentown, Pennsylvania, from 1936 to 1945, at the College of the Holy Cross from 1945 to 1948, and at Dartmouth College from 1950 to 1967, compiling a career college basketball record of 379–332. Julian led Holy Cross to the NCAA title in 1947. His team, which included later National Basketball Association (NBA) great Bob Cousy, almost repeated this feat in 1948, losing in the semifinals. Dartmouth reached the NCAA tournament three times under him, with their 1959 appearance being their last appearance in the tournament as of 2026; in the eight seasons following 1959, Dartmouth had a losing record six times.

Julian was hired by the Boston Celtics of the NBA after his college success, but he recorded only a 47–81 mark before he was dismissed in 1950. Julian was also the head football coach at Schuylkill College from 1925 to 1928, Albright College from 1929 to 1930, and Mulhlenberg from 1936 to 1944, amassing a career college football record of 77–63–3. In addition, he served as Mulhlenberg's head baseball coach from 1942 to 1944, tallying a mark of 16–18. Julian was inducted into the Naismith Memorial Basketball Hall of Fame as a coach in 1968.

== Death ==
Julian died on July 28, 1967, at a nursing home in White River Junction, Vermont. He had suffered a stroke the previous December in Rochester, New York while coaching Dartmouth in the Kodak Classic basketball tournament.

== Head coaching record ==
=== Basketball ===
==== College ====
Record table
Season	Team	Overall	Conference	Standing	Postseason
Muhlenberg Mules (Independent) (1936–1945)
1936–37	Muhlenberg	9–9			
1937–38	Muhlenberg	9–11			
1938–39	Muhlenberg	13–8			
1939–40	Muhlenberg	11–9			
1940–41	Muhlenberg	13–10			
1941–42	Muhlenberg	17–7			
1942–43	Muhlenberg	13–8			
1943–44	Muhlenberg	20–5			NIT Quarterfinal
1944–45	Muhlenberg	24–4			NIT Quarterfinal
Muhlenberg:		129–71			
Holy Cross Crusaders (Independent) (1945–1948)
1945–46	Holy Cross	12–3			
1946–47	Holy Cross	27–3			NCAA Champion
1947–48	Holy Cross	26–4			NCAA Third Place
Holy Cross:		65–10			
Dartmouth Indians (Eastern Intercollegiate Basketball League / Ivy league) (1950–1967)
1950–51	Dartmouth	3–23	1–11	7th	
1951–52	Dartmouth	11–19	4–8	T–5th	
1952–53	Dartmouth	12–14	5–7	T–5th	
1953–54	Dartmouth	13–13	5–9	6th	
1954–55	Dartmouth	18–7	9–5	4th	
1955–56	Dartmouth	18–11	10–4	1st	NCAA Tournament Regional semifinal
1956–57	Dartmouth	18–7	10–4	2nd	
1957–58	Dartmouth	22–5	11–3	1st	NCAA University Division Regional Final
1958–59	Dartmouth	22–6	13–1	T–1st	NCAA University Division Regional Quarterfinal
1959–60	Dartmouth	14–9	10–4	2nd	
1960–61	Dartmouth	5–19	4–10	T–6th	
1961–62	Dartmouth	6–18	3–11	T–6th	
1962–63	Dartmouth	7–18	2–12	8th	
1963–64	Dartmouth	2–23	0–14	8th	
1964–65	Dartmouth	4–21	1–13	8th	
1965–66	Dartmouth	3–21	0–14	8th	
1966–67	Dartmouth	5–2	0–0	8th	
Dartmouth:		183–236	54–86		
Total:		377–317			
National champion Postseason invitational champion Conference regular season champion Conference regular season and conference tournament champion Division regular season champion Division regular season and conference tournament champion Conference tournament champion

==== NBA ====
Legend
Regular season	G	Games coached	W	Games won	L	Games lost	W–L %	Win–loss %
Playoffs	PG	Playoff games	PW	Playoff wins	PL	Playoff losses	PW–L %	Playoff win–loss %

Team	Year	G	W	L	W–L%	Finish	PG	PW	PL	PW–L%	Result
Boston	1948–49	60	25	35	.417	5th in Eastern	–	–	–	–	–
Boston	1949–50	68	22	46	.324	6th in Eastern	–	–	–	–	–
Career		128	47	81	.367		–	–	–	–	–

=== Football ===
==== College ====
Year	Team	Overall	Conference	Standing	Bowl/playoffs
Schuylkill Orange and Black / Lions (Independent) (1925–1928)
1925	Schuylkill	3–5–1			
1926	Schuylkill	6–3			
1927	Schuylkill	5–4			
1928	Schuylkill	7–2			
Schuylkill:		21–14–1			
Albright Lions (Independent) (1929–1930)
1929	Albright	7–2			
1930	Albright	7–1–1			
Albright:		14–3–1			
Muhlenberg Mules (Eastern Pennsylvania Collegiate Conference) (1936–1942)
1936	Muhlenberg	2–6–1	1–2–1	T–3rd	
1937	Muhlenberg	5–5	2–2	T–2nd	
1938	Muhlenberg	7–3	3–1	T–1st	
1939	Muhlenberg	6–4	2–1	2nd	
1940	Muhlenberg	4–6	2–1	2nd	
1941	Muhlenberg	6–4	2–1	T–1st	
1942	Muhlenberg	7–3	3–0	1st	
Muhlenberg Mules (Independent) (1943–1944)
1943	Muhlenberg	1–10			
1944	Muhlenberg	4–5			
Muhlenberg:		42–46–1	15–8–1		
Total:		77–63–3			
National championship Conference title Conference division title or championship game berth

==== High school ====
Year	Team	Overall	Conference	Standing	Bowl/playoffs
Ashland Black Diamonds (Pennsylvania Interscholastic Athletic Association) (1933–1935)
1933	Ashland	10–1			
1934	Ashland	9–3			
1935	Ashland	11–0		1st	
Ashland:		30–4			
Total:		30–4			
National championship Conference title Conference division title or championship game berth

== See also ==
- List of NCAA Division I Men's Final Four appearances by coach
