= 1946–47 UCLA Bruins men's basketball team =

American college basketball season

1946–47 UCLA Bruins men's basketball

PCC Southern Division
- Conference: Pacific Coast Conference
- South
- Record: 18–7 (9–3 PCC)
- Head coach: Wilbur Johns (8th season)
- Assistant coach: Bill Putnam
- Home arena: Men's Gym

1946–47 Pacific Coast Conference men's basketball standings
	Conf.				Overall
Team	W		L	PCT	W		L	PCT
North
Oregon State †	13	–	3	.813	28	–	5	.848
Washington State	11	–	5	.688	23	–	10	.697
Washington	8	–	8	.500	16	–	8	.667
Oregon	7	–	9	.438	18	–	9	.667
Idaho	1	–	15	.063	4	–	24	.143
South
UCLA	9	–	3	.750	18	–	7	.720
California	8	–	4	.667	20	–	11	.645
Stanford	5	–	7	.417	15	–	16	.484
USC	2	–	10	.167	10	–	14	.417
† Conference playoff series winner

The 1946–47 UCLA Bruins men's basketball team represented the University of California, Los Angeles during the 1946–47 NCAA men's basketball season and were members of the Pacific Coast Conference. The Bruins were led by eighth year head coach Wilbur Johns. They finished the regular season with a record of 18–7 and won the PCC southern division with a record of 9–3.

== Previous season ==
The Bruins finished the regular season with a record of 8–16 and where third in the PCC southern division with a record of 5–7.

== Roster ==
1946–47 UCLA Bruins men's basketball team
Players
Coaches

Pos.	#	Name	Height	Weight	Year	Hometown
G	17	Bob Arnold	—	—
C	11	Don Barksdale	6 ft 6 in (1.98 m)	200 lb (91 kg)		Berkeley, California
F	55	Eldon Bennet	—	—
F	56	Guy Buccola	—	—	So
		Hicks	—	—
		Kalb	—	—
		Marv Lee	—	—
G	10	Dave Minor	—	—
G	78	Ron Pearson	—	—	So
G	4	Richard Perry (C)	—	—
G	3	Bill Rankin	—	—	Jr
	13	Doug Sale	—	—
F	6	John Stanich	—	—		Sacramento, California
F	12	Dick West	—	—	Jr

Head coach

Wilbur Johns (UCLA)

Assistant coach(es)

- Bill Putnam

Legend

- (C) Team captain
- (S) Suspended
- (I) Ineligible
- (W) Walk-on
- Injured
- Current redshirt

== Schedule ==
Date time, TV	Rank^{#}	Opponent^{#}	Result	Record	Site city, state
Regular Season
December 6, 1946*		UC Santa Barbara	W 32–18	1–0	Men's Gym; Los Angeles
December 7, 1946*		San Francisco	W 43–30	2–0	Men's Gym; Los Angeles, CA
December 13, 1946*		Redlands	W 81–46	3–0	Men's Gym; Los Angeles, CA
December 14, 1946*		Santa Clara	L 49–54	3–1	Men's Gym; Los Angeles, CA
December 20, 1946*		Los Angeles Police	W 83–18	4–1	Men's Gym; Los Angeles, CA
December 26, 1946*		vs. Wyoming	W 54–41	5–1	Buffalo, NY
December 28, 1946*		at St. Joseph's	W 50–48	6–1	Philadelphia, PA
December 30, 1946*		at NYU	L 49–66	6–2	Madison Square Garden; New York, NY
January 2, 1947		at Purdue	W 59–53	7–2	Lambert Fieldhouse; West Lafayette, IN
January 10, 1947		Stanford	L 33–38	7–3 (0–1)	Men's Gym; Los Angeles, CA
January 11, 1947		Stanford	W 48–40	8–3 (1–1)	Men's Gym; Los Angeles, CA
January 17, 1947		at USC	W 60–49	9–3 (2–1)	Shrine Auditorium; Los Angeles, CA
January 18, 1947		USC	W 61–46	10–3 (3–1)	Men's Gym; Los Angeles, CA
January 24, 1947		at California	W 52–45	11–3 (4–1)	Men's Gym; Berkeley, CA
January 25, 1947		at California	L 46–62	11–4 (4–2)	Men's Gym; Berkeley, CA
February 7, 1947		Carroll's Shamrocks	W 69–59	12–4	Men's Gym; Los Angeles, CA
February 10, 1947		20th Century Fox	W 66–58	13–4	Men's Gym; Los Angeles, CA
February 14, 1947		California	W 85–52	14–4 (5–2)	Men's Gym; Los Angeles, CA
February 15, 1947		California	W 72–59	15–4 (6–2)	Men's Gym; Los Angeles, CA
February 21, 1947		at Stanford	W 56–39	16–4 (7–2)	Stanford Pavilion; Stanford, CA
February 22, 1947		at Stanford	L 53–68	16–5 (7–3)	Men's Gym; Los Angeles, CA
February 28, 1947		at USC	W 71–66	17–6 (8–4)	Shrine Auditorium; Los Angeles, CA
March 1, 1947		USC	W 66–54	18–5 (9–3)	Men's Gym; Los Angeles, CA
Conference Championship
March 7, 1947		at Oregon State; PCC Championship play-offs	L 52–69	18–6	Men's Gymnasium; Corvallis, OR
March 8, 1947		at Oregon State; PCC Championship play-offs	L 46–63	18–7	Men Gymnasium; Corvallis, OR
*Non-conference game. ^{#}Rankings from AP Poll. (#) Tournament seedings in parentheses. All times are in Pacific Time.
