= 1946–47 Washington Huskies men's basketball team =

American college basketball season

1946–47 Washington Huskies men's basketball
- Conference: Pacific Coast Conference
- Record: 16–8 (8–8 PCC)
- Head coach: Hec Edmundson (27th season)
- Assistant coach: Art McLarney
- Home arena: UW Pavilion

1946–47 Pacific Coast Conference men's basketball standings
	Conf.				Overall
Team	W		L	PCT	W		L	PCT
North
Oregon State †	13	–	3	.813	28	–	5	.848
Washington State	11	–	5	.688	23	–	10	.697
Washington	8	–	8	.500	16	–	8	.667
Oregon	7	–	9	.438	18	–	9	.667
Idaho	1	–	15	.063	4	–	24	.143
South
UCLA	9	–	3	.750	18	–	7	.720
California	8	–	4	.667	20	–	11	.645
Stanford	5	–	7	.417	15	–	16	.484
USC	2	–	10	.167	10	–	14	.417
† Conference playoff series winner

The 1946–47 Washington Huskies men's basketball team represented the University of Washington for the 1946–47 NCAA college basketball season. Led by 27th-year head coach Hec Edmundson, the Huskies were members of the Pacific Coast Conference and played their home games on campus at the UW Pavilion in Seattle, Washington.

The Huskies were 16–8 overall in the regular season and 8–8 in conference play; third in the Northern division.

Edmundson stepped down after this season, but continued as track coach until the summer of 1954; assistant Art McLarney was promoted to head basketball coach and led the program for three seasons. The twenty-year-old UW Pavilion was renamed for Edmundson in January 1948.
