= 1947 NCAA Men's Basketball All-Americans =

- Awarded for: 1946–47 NCAA men's basketball season

The consensus 1947 College Basketball All-American team was determined by aggregating the results of three major All-American teams. To earn "consensus" status, a player must win honors from most teams: the Helms Athletic Foundation, Converse, and True Magazine.

== 1947 Consensus All-America team ==
Consensus First Team
Player	Position	Class	Team
Ralph Beard	G	Sophomore	Kentucky
Alex Groza	C	Sophomore	Kentucky
Ralph Hamilton	G	Senior	Indiana
Sid Tanenbaum	G	Senior	New York University
Gerry Tucker	C	Senior	Oklahoma

Consensus Second Team
Player	Position	Class	Team
Don Barksdale	C	Senior	UCLA
Arnie Ferrin	F	Junior	Utah
Vern Gardner	C	Senior	Utah
John Hargis	G	Senior	Texas
George Kaftan	F	Junior	Holy Cross
Ed Koffenberger	C	Junior	Duke
Andy Phillip	G/F	Senior	Illinois

== Individual All-America teams ==
All-America Team
All-America Team	First team		Second team		Third team	
All-America Team	Player	School	Player	School	Player	School
Helms	Don Barksdale	UCLA	Charles B. Black	Kansas	Lew Beck	Oregon State
Helms	Ralph Beard	Kentucky	Billy Gabor	Syracuse	Jim Homer	Alabama
Helms	Leland Byrd	West Virginia	Alex Groza	Kentucky	Tony Lavelli	Yale
Helms	Arnie Ferrin	Utah	Paul Hoffman	Purdue	Joe Lord	Villanova
Helms	Ralph Hamilton	Indiana	Dave Humerickhouse	Bradley	Ed Macauley	Saint Louis
Helms	John Hargis	Texas	Wallace Jones	Kentucky	Dick McGuire	St. John's
Helms	George Kaftan	Holy Cross	Dan Kraus	Georgetown	Clifton McNeely	Texas Wesleyan
Helms	Ed Koffenberger	Duke	Kevin O'Shea	Notre Dame	Jack Smiley	Illinois
Helms	Sid Tanenbaum	NYU	Red Rocha	Oregon State	Ernie Vandeweghe	Colgate
Helms	Gerry Tucker	Oklahoma	Kenneth Shugart	Navy		
Helms			Herb Wilkinson	Iowa		
Converse	Ralph Beard	Kentucky	Lew Beck	Oregon State	Don Barksdale	UCLA
Converse	Vern Gardner	Utah	Arnie Ferrin	Utah	Bobby Cook	Wisconsin
Converse	Ralph Hamilton	Indiana	Alex Groza	Kentucky	John Hargis	Texas
Converse	George Kaftan	Holy Cross	Wallace Jones	Kentucky	Paul Hoffman	Purdue
Converse	Gerry Tucker	Oklahoma	Sid Tanenbaum	NYU	Ed Koffenberger	Duke
True Magazine	Ralph Beard	Kentucky	Bobby Cook	Wisconsin	Don Barksdale	UCLA
True Magazine	Alex Groza	Kentucky	John Dillon	North Carolina	Ralph Hamilton	Indiana
True Magazine	Andy Phillip	Illinois	Tony Lavelli	Yale	John Hargis	Texas
True Magazine	Sid Tanenbaum	NYU	Dick McGuire	St. John's	Ed Koffenberger	Duke
True Magazine	Gerry Tucker	Oklahoma	Jack Tingle	Kentucky	Kevin O'Shea	Notre Dame

== See also ==
- 1946–47 NCAA men's basketball season
