= 1946–47 CCNY Beavers men's basketball team =

American college basketball season

1946–47 CCNY Beavers men's basketball

NCAA tournament, Fourth place
- Conference: Metropolitan New York Conference
- Record: 17–6 (4–1 MTNY)
- Head coach: Nat Holman (28th season)
- Assistant coach: Bobby Sand

1946–47 Metropolitan New York Conference men's basketball standings
	Conf.				Overall
Team	W		L	PCT	W		L	PCT
St. John's	6	–	0	1.000	16	–	7	.696
CCNY	4	–	1	.800	17	–	6	.739
Fordham	4	–	2	.667	19	–	5	.792
NYU	3	–	3	.500	12	–	9	.571
St. Francis (NY)	2	–	3	.400	14	–	7	.667
Manhattan	1	–	5	.167	13	–	13	.500
Brooklyn	0	–	6	.000	12	–	8	.600

The 1946–47 CCNY Beavers men's basketball team represented the City College of New York as a member of the Metropolitan New York Conference during the 1946–47 NCAA men's basketball season. The head coach was Nat Holman, who was one of the game's greatest innovators and playmakers. Unlike today, when colleges recruit players from all over the country, the 1946–47 CCNY team was composed of "kids from the sidewalks of New York City," who had been recruited by Holman's assistant coach Harold "Bobby" Sand from Public Schools Athletic League (PSAL) schools such as Taft, Clinton, Boys, Erasmus, and Franklin High Schools.

== Roster ==
1946–47 CCNY Beavers men's basketball team
Players
Coaches

Pos.	#	Name	Height	Weight	Year	Previous school	Hometown
SF		Irwin Dambrot	6 ft 4 in (1.93 m)	175 lb (79 kg)	Fr	William Howard Taft HS
PG		Mike Wittlin	5 ft 10 in (1.78 m)	—	Fr
C		Joe Galiber	6 ft 4 in (1.93 m)	—	Fr

Head coach

- Nat Holman (NYU)

Assistant coach(es)

- Bobby Sand

Legend

- (C) Team captain
- (S) Suspended
- (I) Ineligible
- (W) Walk-on
- Injured
- Current redshirt

== Schedule and results ==
Date time, TV	Opponent	Result	Record	Site city, state
Regular Season
NCAA tournament
Mar 20, 1947*	vs. Wisconsin; East Regional Semifinal / National Quarterfinal – Elite Eight	W 70–56	17–4	Madison Square Garden; New York, New York
Mar 22, 1947*	vs. Holy Cross; East Regional Final / National Semifinal – Final Four	L 45–60	17–5	Madison Square Garden; New York, New York
Mar 25, 1947*	vs. Texas; National consolation game	L 50–54	17–6	Madison Square Garden; New York, New York
*Non-conference game. ^{#}Rankings from AP Poll. (#) Tournament seedings in parentheses. All times are in Eastern Time..
