= 1946–47 Washington State Cougars men's basketball team =

American college basketball season

1946–47 Washington State Cougars men's basketball
- Conference: Pacific Coast Conference
- Record: 23–10 (11–5 PCC)
- Head coach: Jack Friel (19th season)
- Home arena: Bohler Gymnasium

1946–47 Pacific Coast Conference men's basketball standings
	Conf.				Overall
Team	W		L	PCT	W		L	PCT
North
Oregon State †	13	–	3	.813	28	–	5	.848
Washington State	11	–	5	.688	23	–	10	.697
Washington	8	–	8	.500	16	–	8	.667
Oregon	7	–	9	.438	18	–	9	.667
Idaho	1	–	15	.063	4	–	24	.143
South
UCLA	9	–	3	.750	18	–	7	.720
California	8	–	4	.667	20	–	11	.645
Stanford	5	–	7	.417	15	–	16	.484
USC	2	–	10	.167	10	–	14	.417
† Conference playoff series winner

The 1946–47 Washington State Cougars men's basketball team represented Washington State College for the 1946–47 college basketball season. Led by nineteenth-year head coach Jack Friel, the Cougars were members of the Pacific Coast Conference and played their home games on campus at Bohler Gymnasium in Pullman, Washington.

The Cougars were 23–10 overall in the regular season and 11–5 in conference play, second place in the Northern division.
