= Ed Koffenberger =

American basketball and lacrosse player (1926–2014)

Personal information
- Born: July 4, 1926 Wilmington, Delaware, U.S.
- Died: September 21, 2014 (aged 88) Hockessin, Delaware, U.S.
- Listed height: 6 ft 2 in (1.88 m)

Career information
- High school: P.S. duPont (Wilmington, Delaware)
- College: Duke (1944–1947)
- NBA draft: 1947: – round, 48th overall pick
- Drafted by: Philadelphia Warriors
- Position: Center
- Number: 55, 43

Career highlights
- Consensus second-team All-American (1947); Second-team All-American – Helms, Converse (1946); First-team All-SoCon (1946); Second-team All-SoCon (1945)
- Stats at Basketball Reference

Edward Leroy Koffenberger (July 4, 1926 – September 21, 2014) was an American stand-out basketball and lacrosse player for the Duke University in 1945–46 and 1946–47. He is considered Duke's first "two-sport star" even though most of his accolades came from playing basketball. A native of Wilmington, Delaware, Koffenberger was the only First Team All-American basketball player from his home state when the Helms Foundation awarded him the distinction. As a 6 ft 2 in (1.88 m) center, Koffenberger led the Blue Devils in scoring during both seasons he played for them, and during his senior season of 1946–47, he led the Southern Conference in both scoring and rebounding. He was a two-time All-American and two-time All-Conference selection in basketball, and in lacrosse he was a one-time All-American for his intimidating defensive presence. In 54 career basketball games he scored 733 points, including a then-Duke record 416 in 1946–47.

Koffenberger was selected by the Philadelphia Warriors in a late round of the 1947 BAA draft, although he only briefly played professionally but never in the Basketball Association of America. After basketball he became an engineer, spending the majority of his career at DuPont.

In 1977 he was inducted into the Delaware Sports Hall of Fame.

Koffenberger died of leukemia on September 21, 2014, at the age of 88.
