= Harry Combs =

Harry Combs may refer to:

- Harry Combs (politician) (1881–1954), New Zealand politician
- Harry B. Combs (1913–2003), American aviation pioneer and author

== See also ==
- Harry Combes (1915–1977), American basketball coach
