= Bruce Drake =

Basketball player and coach (1905–1983)

Biographical details
- Born: December 5, 1905
- Died: December 4, 1983 (aged 77)

Playing career

Basketball
- 1926–1929: Oklahoma

Track and field
- 1927–1929: Oklahoma

Coaching career (HC unless noted)

Basketball
- 1938–1955: Oklahoma

Golf
- 1933–1951: Oklahoma

Head coaching record
- Overall: 200–182 (.524)
- Tournaments: 4–3 (.571)

Accomplishments and honors

Championships
- 5 Big Six Championship (1939, 1940, 1942, 1944, 1947); Big Seven Championship (1949); NCAA Runner-up (1947); NCAA Final Four (1939)

Awards
- Helms Foundation All-American (1929); First-team All-Big Six (1929)
- Basketball Hall of Fame; Inducted in 1973 (profile)
- College Basketball Hall of Fame; Inducted in 2006

Bruce Drake (December 5, 1905 – December 4, 1983) was an American college men's basketball and golf coach. The Gentry, Texas native was head coach at the University of Oklahoma between 1938 and 1955, compiling a 200–181 record. He also coached the Air Force team to a 34–14 record in 1956.

Prior to coaching, he was also a star for Hugh McDermott's Oklahoma team. He was a 1928–29 Helms Foundation All-American. He was a multi-sport athlete at Oklahoma.

As a coach, Drake led the Sooners to two Final Fours–the first one in 1939, here they lost to Oregon 55–37; the second in 1947, where he lost in the Championship Game to Holy Cross 58–47. He made only one additional NCAA tournament appearance, in 1943. However, he coached at a time when only eight teams made the tournament. He won or shared six (Big Six/Big Seven conference titles. At the time of his retirement, he was the winningest coach in OU history, but is now third behind Billy Tubbs and Kelvin Sampson.

He coached 5 Olympic (Wayne Glasgow and Marcus Freiberger of University of Oklahoma, 1952; Bill Evans, Ron Tomsic and Gib Ford of Air Force team, 1956) and three All-Americans (Jimmy McNatt, 1940; Gerald Tucker, 1943, 1947; Allie Paine, 1944)

Drake was selected as the assistant coach for the 1956 USA Men's Basketball Gold Medal Olympic Team

In 1958 he coached the Wichita Vickers in the National Industrial Basketball League getting 30–21 record tying him for first with his old player Gerald Tucker who was coaching the Bartlesville Phillips 66ers.

One of the lasting contributions Drake developed is the shuffle offense. He helped make goaltending illegal.

Drake was the Chairman of the NCAA Rules Committee from 1951 to 1955. He made the Basketball Hall of Fame as a coach in 1973.

== Head coaching record ==
Record table
Season	Team	Overall	Conference	Standing	Postseason
Oklahoma Sooners (Big Six Conference) (1938–1947)
1938–39	Oklahoma	12–9	7–3	T–1st	NCAA Final Four
1939–40	Oklahoma	12–7	8–2	T–1st	
1940–41	Oklahoma	6–12	5–5	4th	
1941–42	Oklahoma	11–7	8–2	T–1st	
1942–43	Oklahoma	18–9	7–3	2nd	NCAA Elite Eight
1943–44	Oklahoma	15–8	9–1	T–1st	
1944–45	Oklahoma	12–13	5–5	T–3rd	
1945–46	Oklahoma	11–10	7–3	2nd	
1946–47	Oklahoma	24–7	8–2	1st	NCAA Runner-up
Oklahoma Sooners (Big Seven Conference) (1947–1955)
1947–48	Oklahoma	13–9	7–5	T–2nd	
1948–49	Oklahoma	14–10	9–3	T–1st	
1949–50	Oklahoma	12–10	6–6	T–4th	
1950–51	Oklahoma	14–10	6–6	4th	
1951–52	Oklahoma	7–17	4–8	T–4th	
1952–53	Oklahoma	8–13	5–7	T–4th	
1953–54	Oklahoma	8–13	4–8	6th	
1954–55	Oklahoma	3–18	1–11	7th	
Oklahoma:		200–182 (.524)	106–80 (.570)		
Total:		200–182 (.524)			
National champion Postseason invitational champion Conference regular season champion Conference regular season and conference tournament champion Division regular season champion Division regular season and conference tournament champion Conference tournament champion

== See also ==
- List of NCAA Division I Men's Final Four appearances by coach
