= 1946–47 Idaho Vandals men's basketball team =

American college basketball season

1946–47 Idaho Vandals men's basketball
- Conference: Pacific Coast Conference
- Record: 4–24 (1–15 PCC)
- Head coach: Guy Wicks (2nd season)
- Assistant coach: Steve Belko
- MVP: John Evans
- Home arena: Memorial Gymnasium

1946–47 Pacific Coast Conference men's basketball standings
	Conf.				Overall
Team	W		L	PCT	W		L	PCT
North
Oregon State †	13	–	3	.813	28	–	5	.848
Washington State	11	–	5	.688	23	–	10	.697
Washington	8	–	8	.500	16	–	8	.667
Oregon	7	–	9	.438	18	–	9	.667
Idaho	1	–	15	.063	4	–	24	.143
South
UCLA	9	–	3	.750	18	–	7	.720
California	8	–	4	.667	20	–	11	.645
Stanford	5	–	7	.417	15	–	16	.484
USC	2	–	10	.167	10	–	14	.417
† Conference playoff series winner

The 1946–47 Idaho Vandals men's basketball team represented the University of Idaho during the 1946–47 NCAA college basketball season. Members of the Pacific Coast Conference, the Vandals were led by second-year head coach Guy Wicks and played their home games on campus at Memorial Gymnasium in Moscow, Idaho.

The Vandals were defending Northern Division champions, but fell to 4–24 overall and 1–15 in conference play.

Alumnus Wicks returned to the university after serving in the U.S. Navy during World War II; his first season as head coach was 1941–42. Over the next four seasons, UI basketball was led by acting athletic director James "Babe" Brown, who was also the head football coach in 1945 and 1946.

Idaho's sole conference victory was over Oregon State, the eventual PCC champion.

Wicks resigned as head coach (basketball and baseball) that summer and went into administration at the university; Charles Finley, head coach at the New Mexico School of Mines, was hired as his successor for both sports.
