= 1946–47 Texas Longhorns men's basketball team =

American college basketball season

1946–47 Texas Longhorns men's basketball
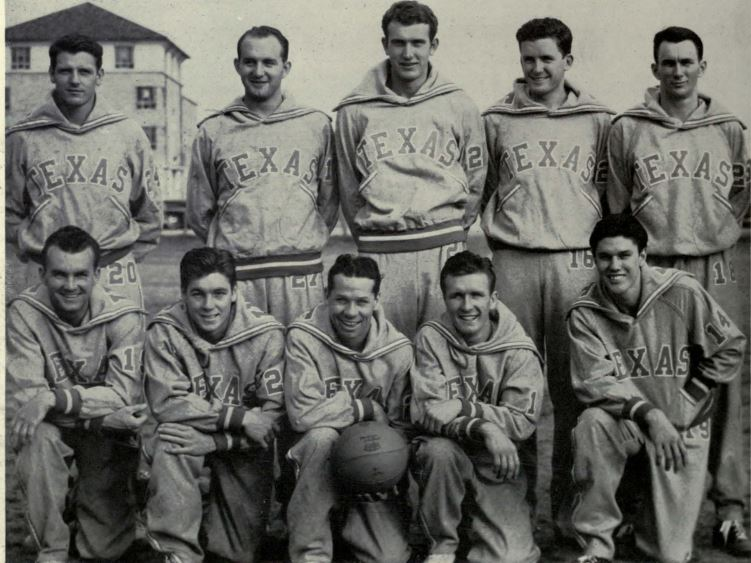

Southwest Conference Champions

NCAA Tournament, Final Four
- Conference: Southwest Conference
- Record: 26–2 (12–0 SWC)
- Head coach: Jack Gray (8th season)

The 1946–47 Texas Longhorns men's basketball team represented the University of Texas at Austin in intercollegiate basketball competition during the 1946–47 season. The Longhorns were led by eighth-year head coach and former Longhorn basketball consensus first-team All-American Jack Gray. The team finished the season with a 26–2 overall record, for the highest win percentage in all of college basketball for the season, and a 12–0 record in Southwest Conference play to win the SWC championship. Texas advanced to the NCAA tournament for the third time, recording its second Final Four appearance.

== Schedule and results ==
Coach: Jack Gray; Overall Record: 26–2; Southwest Conference Record: 12–0; Southwest Conference Standing: 1st
Date	Opponent	Site	Result	Record
Regular Season
Dec 2	North Texas	Gregory Gymnasium • Austin, Texas	W 63–41	1–0
Dec 3	North Texas	Gregory Gymnasium • Austin, Texas	W 66–40	2–0
Dec 6	Houston YMCA	Gregory Gymnasium • Austin, Texas	W 53–23	3–0
Dec 10	Continental Airways	Gregory Gymnasium • Austin, Texas	W 46–34	4–0
Dec 14	at Canisius	? • Buffalo, New York	W 52–46	5–0
Dec 17	at Long Island	Madison Square Garden • New York, New York	W 47–46	6–0
Dec 19	at DePaul	? • Chicago, Illinois	W 61–43	7–0
Dec 26	vs. Missouri	? • Oklahoma City, Oklahoma	W 65–46	8–0
Dec 27	vs. Oklahoma A&M	? • Oklahoma City, Oklahoma	L 39–40	8–1
Dec 28	vs. Oklahoma	? • Oklahoma City, Oklahoma	W 62–50	9–1
Jan 3	at Southwest Texas State	? • San Marcos, Texas	W 68–37	10–1
Jan 6	TCU*	Gregory Gymnasium • Austin, Texas	W 62–46	11–1 (1–0 SWC)
Jan 10	at Baylor*	? • Waco, Texas	W 45–38	12–1 (2–0)
Jan 15	SMU*	Gregory Gymnasium • Austin, Texas	W 56–36	13–1 (3–0)
Jan 18	at Rice*	? • Houston, Texas	W 67–53	14–1 (4–0)
Jan 30	Southwestern	Gregory Gymnasium • Austin, Texas	W 63–39	15–1
Feb 3	Texas A&M*	Gregory Gymnasium • Austin, Texas	W 61–41	16–1 (5–0)
Feb 7	at TCU*	? • Fort Worth, Texas	W 72–44	17–1 (6–0)
Feb 8	at SMU*	? • Dallas, Texas	W 58–51	18–1 (7–0)
Feb 15	at Texas A&M*	? • College Station, Texas	W 69–40	19–1 (8–0)
Feb 19	Baylor*	Gregory Gymnasium • Austin, Texas	W 70–52	20–1 (9–0)
Feb 22	Rice*	Gregory Gymnasium • Austin, Texas	W 67–60	21–1 (10–0)
Feb 28	Arkansas	Gregory Gymnasium • Austin, Texas	W 49–44	22–1 (11–0)
Mar 1	Arkansas	Gregory Gymnasium • Austin, Texas	W 66–46	23–1 (12–0)
Mar 4	Southwest Conference All-Stars	Gregory Gymnasium • Austin, Texas	W 64–52	24–1
1947 NCAA tournament
Mar 21	Wyoming	Municipal Auditorium • Kansas City, Missouri; NCAA Tournament Quarterfinal (West Regional)	W 42–40	25–1
Mar 22	Oklahoma	Municipal Auditorium • Kansas City, Missouri; NCAA Tournament Semifinal (West Regional)	L 54–55	25–2
Mar 25	City College of New York	Madison Square Garden • New York, New York; NCAA Tournament National Third-Place Game	W 54–50	26–2
*Southwest Conference game.
