= 1947 NCAA basketball tournament =

Edition of USA college basketball tournament

- Teams: 8
- Finals site: Madison Square Garden, New York City, New York
- Champions: Holy Cross Crusaders (1st title, 1st title game, 1st Final Four)
- Runner-up: Oklahoma Sooners (1st title game, 2nd Final Four)
- Semifinalists: CCNY Beavers (1st Final Four); Texas Longhorns (2nd Final Four)
- Winning coach: Doggie Julian (1st title)
- MOP: George Kaftan (Holy Cross)
- Attendance: 72,959
- Top scorer: George Kaftan (Holy Cross) (63 points)

The 1947 NCAA basketball tournament involved eight schools playing in single-elimination play to determine the national champion of men's NCAA Division I college basketball. The 9th annual edition of the tournament began on March 19, 1947, and ended with the championship game on March 25, at Madison Square Garden in New York City. A total of 10 games were played, including a third place game in each region and a national third place game.

Holy Cross, coached by Doggie Julian, won the national title with a 58–47 victory in the final game over Oklahoma, coached by Bruce Drake. George Kaftan of Holy Cross was named the tournament's Most Outstanding Player and was on a roster that included future Los Angeles Lakers coach Joe Mullaney and Basketball Hall of Famer Bob Cousy.

== Locations ==
The following are the sites selected to host each round of the 1947 tournament:

=== Regionals ===
March 19 and 22
West Regional, Municipal Auditorium, Kansas City, Missouri (Host: Missouri Valley Conference)
March 20 and 22
East Regional, Madison Square Garden, New York, New York (Host: Metropolitan New York Conference)

=== Championship Game ===
March 25
Madison Square Garden, New York, New York (Host: Metropolitan New York Conference)

== Teams ==
Region	Team	Coach	Conference	Finished	Final Opponent	Score
East
East	CCNY	Nat Holman	MNYC	Fourth Place	Texas	L 54–50
East	Holy Cross	Doggie Julian	Independent	Champion	Oklahoma	W 58–47
East	Navy	Ben Carnevale	Independent	Regional Fourth Place	Wisconsin	L 50–49
East	Wisconsin	Bud Foster	Big Ten	Regional third place	Navy	W 50–49
West
West	Oklahoma	Bruce Drake	Big Six	Runner-up	Holy Cross	L 58–47
West	Oregon State	Slats Gill	Pacific Coast	Regional third place	Wyoming	W 63–46
West	Texas	Jack Gray	Southwest Conference	Third Place	CCNY	W 54–50
West	Wyoming	Everett Shelton	Skyline Conference	Regional Fourth Place	Oregon State	L 63–46

== Bracket ==
Quarterfinals
Holy Cross	55
Navy	47
CCNY	70
Wisconsin	56
Texas	42
Wyoming	40
Oklahoma	56
Oregon State	54

Semifinals
Holy Cross	60
CCNY	45
Texas	54
Oklahoma	55

Finals
Holy Cross	58
Oklahoma	47
Third place
CCNY	50
Texas	54

=== Regional third place games ===
East Regional third place
Navy	49
Wisconsin	50

West Regional third place
Wyoming	46
Oregon State	63

== See also ==
- 1947 National Invitation Tournament
- 1947 NAIA Division I men's basketball tournament
