= 1946–47 Kentucky Wildcats men's basketball team =

1946–47 season of University of Kentucky men's basketball team

1946–47 Kentucky Wildcats men's basketball

SEC regular season and tournament champions

NIT runners-up
- Conference: Southeastern Conference
- Record: 34–3 (11–0 SEC)
- Head coach: Adolph Rupp (17th season)
- Home arena: Memorial Coliseum

The 1946–47 Kentucky Wildcats men's basketball team represented University of Kentucky in intercollegiate basketball during the 1946–47 season. The team finished the season with a 34–3 overall record and were runners-up in the 1947 National Invitation Tournament. The team was retroactively ranked as the top team of the season by the Premo-Porretta Power Poll.
