= George Kaftan =

American basketball player (1928–2018)

Personal information
- Born: February 22, 1928 New York City, New York, U.S.
- Died: October 6, 2018 (aged 90)
- Listed height: 6 ft 3 in (1.91 m)
- Listed weight: 190 lb (86 kg)

Career information
- High school: Xavier (New York City, New York)
- College: Holy Cross (1945–1949)
- BAA draft: 1949: 2nd round
- Drafted by: Boston Celtics
- Playing career: 1949–1953
- Position: Small forward
- Number: 9, 17, 6

Career history

Playing
- 1949–1950: Boston Celtics
- 1950–1952: New York Knicks
- 1952: Pawtucket Slaters
- 1952–1953: Baltimore Bullets

Coaching
- 1958–1972: LIU Post

Career highlights
- NCAA champion (1947); NCAA Final Four MOP (1947); 2× Consensus second-team All-American (1947, 1948); No. 12 retired by Holy Cross Crusaders

Career BAA and NBA statistics
- Points: 1,594 (7.5 ppg)
- Rebounds: 424 (3.1 rpg)
- Assists: 399 (1.9 apg)
- Stats at NBA.com
- Stats at Basketball Reference

George A. Kaftan (February 22, 1928 – October 6, 2018) was an American professional basketball player.

George grew up in New York City and went to Xavier in Manhattan before going to Holy Cross for college. Though just 6'3", Kaftan was the starting center for the College of the Holy Cross team that won the 1947 NCAA basketball tournament. In 1947 Kaftan also won Most Outstanding Player honors after averaging 21 points per game in three games.

Kaftan was selected in the second round of the 1949 BAA Draft. Kaftan later played professionally for the Boston Celtics (1949–1950), New York Knicks (1950–1952) and Baltimore Bullets (1952–1953). He averaged 7.5 points per game in his BAA/NBA career.

Kaftan is a member of the New England Basketball Hall of Fame and the Holy Cross Varsity Club Hall of Fame.

== Personal ==
Kaftan was of Greek descent. His family's original name was Kaftagouras.

=== BAA/NBA career statistics ===
Legend
GP	Games played	MPG	Minutes per game
FG%	Field-goal percentage	FT%	Free-throw percentage
RPG	Rebounds per game	APG	Assists per game
PPG	Points per game	**Bold**	Career high

=== Regular season ===
Year	Team	GP	MPG	FG%	FT%	RPG	APG	PPG
1948–49	Boston	21	–	.368	.626	–	**2.9**	**14.5**
1949–50	Boston	55	–	.372	.654	–	2.6	9.7
1950–51	New York	**61**	–	**.388**	.624	2.5	1.2	4.9
1951–52	New York	52	**18.4**	.375	**.687**	**3.8**	1.7	6.2
1952–53	Baltimore	23	16.5	.317	.657	3.3	1.3	5.8
Career		212	17.8	.370	.650	3.1	1.9	7.5

=== Playoffs ===
Year	Team	GP	MPG	FG%	FT%	RPG	APG	PPG
1951	New York	8	–	.333	.333	.8	.3	1.6
1952	New York	**13**	**17.8**	**.394**	**.667**	**2.3**	**1.7**	6.2
Career		21	17.8	.381	.644	1.7	1.1	4.4
