= 1947 National Invitation Tournament =

Annual NCAA basketball competition

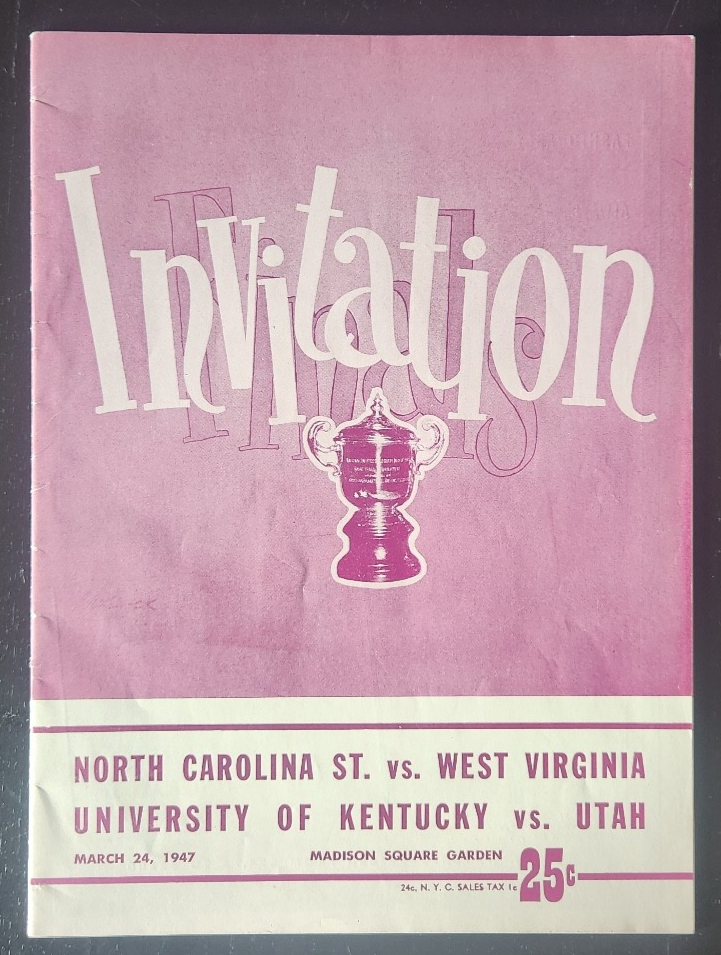

Tournament details
- City: New York City
- Venue: Madison Square Garden
- Teams: 8

Final positions
- Champions: Utah Utes (1st title)
- Runners-up: Kentucky Wildcats
- Semifinalists: North Carolina State Wolfpack; West Virginia Mountaineers

Awards
- MVP: Vern Gardner (Utah)

The 1947 National Invitation Tournament was the 1947 edition of the annual NCAA college basketball competition. The Utah Utes won the tournament, led by Wataru Misaka. Misaka later joined the New York Knicks and became the first person of color to play in modern professional basketball.

In the championship game against the Kentucky Wildcats, Utah held star Ralph Beard to a single point. Beard later pleaded guilty for his part in the 1951 NCAA point shaving scandal.

== Selected teams ==
Below is a list of the 8 teams selected for the tournament.

- Bradley
- Duquesne
- Kentucky
- Long Island
- NC State
- St. John's
- Utah
- West Virginia

== Bracket ==
Below is the tournament bracket.

Quarterfinals
Utah	45
Duquesne	44
West Virginia	69
Bradley	60
Kentucky	66
Long Island	62
NC State	61
St. John's	55

Semifinals
Utah	64
West Virginia	62
Kentucky	60
NC State	42

Finals
Utah	49
Kentucky	45

Third place game
West Virginia	52
NC State	64

== See also ==
- 1947 NCAA basketball tournament
- 1947 NAIA Division I men's basketball tournament
