= 1949–50 Michigan Wolverines men's basketball team =

American college basketball season

1949–50 Michigan Wolverines men's basketball
- Conference: Big Ten Conference
- Record: 11–11 (4–8 Big Ten)
- Head coach: Ernie McCoy
- Captain: Mack Supronowicz
- Home arena: Yost Field House

1949–50 Big Nine Conference men's basketball standings
	Conf.				Overall
Team	W		L	PCT	W		L	PCT
No. 2 Ohio State	11	–	1	.917	22	–	4	.846
No. 16 Wisconsin	9	–	3	.750	17	–	5	.773
No. 20 Indiana	7	–	5	.583	17	–	5	.773
Illinois	7	–	5	.583	14	–	8	.636
Iowa	6	–	6	.500	15	–	7	.682
Minnesota	4	–	8	.333	13	–	9	.591
Michigan	4	–	8	.333	11	–	11	.500
Northwestern	3	–	9	.250	10	–	12	.455
Purdue	3	–	9	.250	9	–	13	.409
Rankings from AP Poll

The 1949–50 Michigan Wolverines men's basketball team represented the University of Michigan in intercollegiate basketball during the 1949–50 season. The team finished the season in a tie for sixth place in the Big Ten Conference with an overall record of 11–11 and 4–8 against conference opponents.

Ernie McCoy was in his second year as the team's head coach. Mack Supronowicz was the team's leading scorer with 278 points in 22 games for an average of 12.6 points per game. Chuck Murray was the team captain.

== Statistical leaders ==
Player	Pos.	Yr	G	FG	FT	RB	Pts	PPG
Mack Supronowicz			22	112	54-89		278	12.6
Leo VanderKuy			22	94	86-151		274	12.5
Don McIntosh			22	76	45-76		197	8.9
Hal Morrill			22	69	41-48		179	8.1
Chuck Murray			22	42	63-94		147	6.6
James Skala			20	34	17-33		85	4.2
Totals			22	468	329-531		1265	57.5

== See also ==
- 1950 in Michigan
