= List of Michigan Wolverines in the NBA draft =

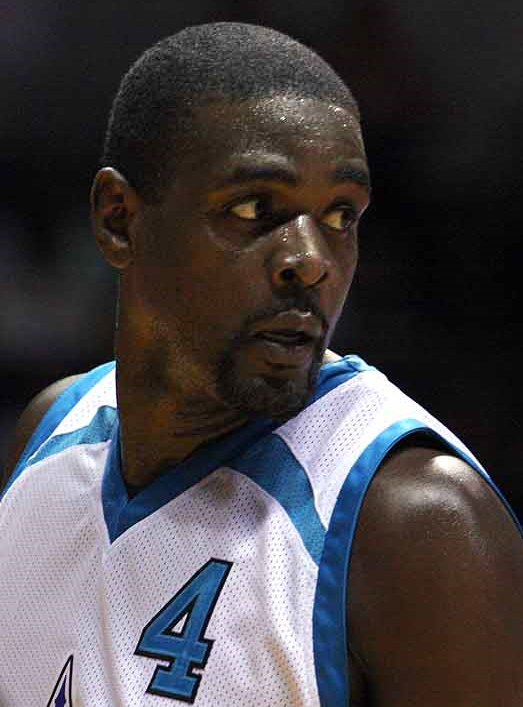
Chris Webber was drafted first overall by the Orlando Magic in the 1993 NBA Draft.

The Michigan Wolverines men's basketball team, representing the University of Michigan, has had 81 players drafted into the National Basketball Association (NBA) since the league began holding the yearly event in 1947. Each NBA franchise seeks to add new players through an annual draft. The NBA uses a draft lottery to determine the first three picks of the NBA draft; the 14 teams that did not make the playoffs the previous year are eligible to participate. After the first three picks are decided, the rest of the teams pick in reverse order of their win–loss record. To be eligible for the NBA draft, a player in the United States must be at least 19 years old during the calendar year of the draft and must be at least one year removed from the graduation of his high school class.

The drafts held between 1947 and 1949 were held by the Basketball Association of America (BAA). The BAA became the National Basketball Association after absorbing teams from the National Basketball League in the fall of 1949. Official NBA publications include the BAA Drafts as part of the NBA's draft history. From 1967 until the ABA–NBA merger in 1976, the American Basketball Association (ABA) held its own draft.

Through the 2026 NBA draft, a Wolverine has been chosen first overall two times in the history of the event, Cazzie Russell in 1966 and Chris Webber in 1993. Thirty-five Wolverines have been drafted in the first round of the NBA Draft, with Morez Johnson Jr., Yaxel Lendeborg and Aday Mara being the latest in 2026. The most Wolverines selected in the first round of a single NBA Draft is three, which happened in 1990 and 2026. Eight players have been selected to either an NBA or ABA All-Star Game, six players have been a member of an NBA or ABA championship winning team, and four players have achieved both (not including Rudy Tomjanovich achieving both as a coach). Two former Wolverines have been inducted into the Naismith Memorial Basketball Hall of Fame.

== Key ==
G	Guard	F	Forward	C	Center

*	Selected to an NBA/ABA All-Star Game
†	Won an NBA/ABA championship
‡	Selected to an All-Star Game and won an NBA/ABA championship

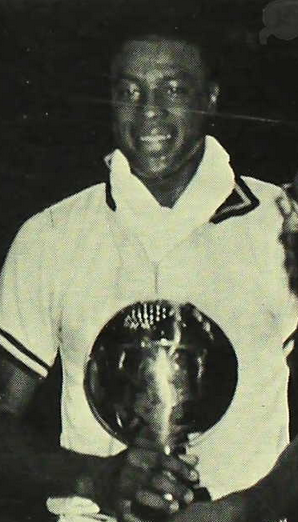
Cazzie Russell was drafted first overall by the New York Knicks in the 1966 NBA Draft.

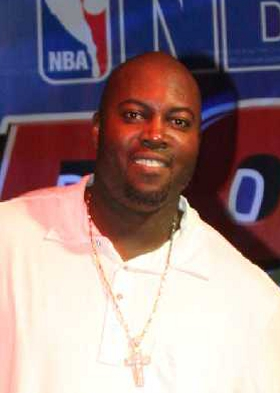
Glen Rice was drafted fourth overall by the Miami Heat in the 1989 NBA Draft.

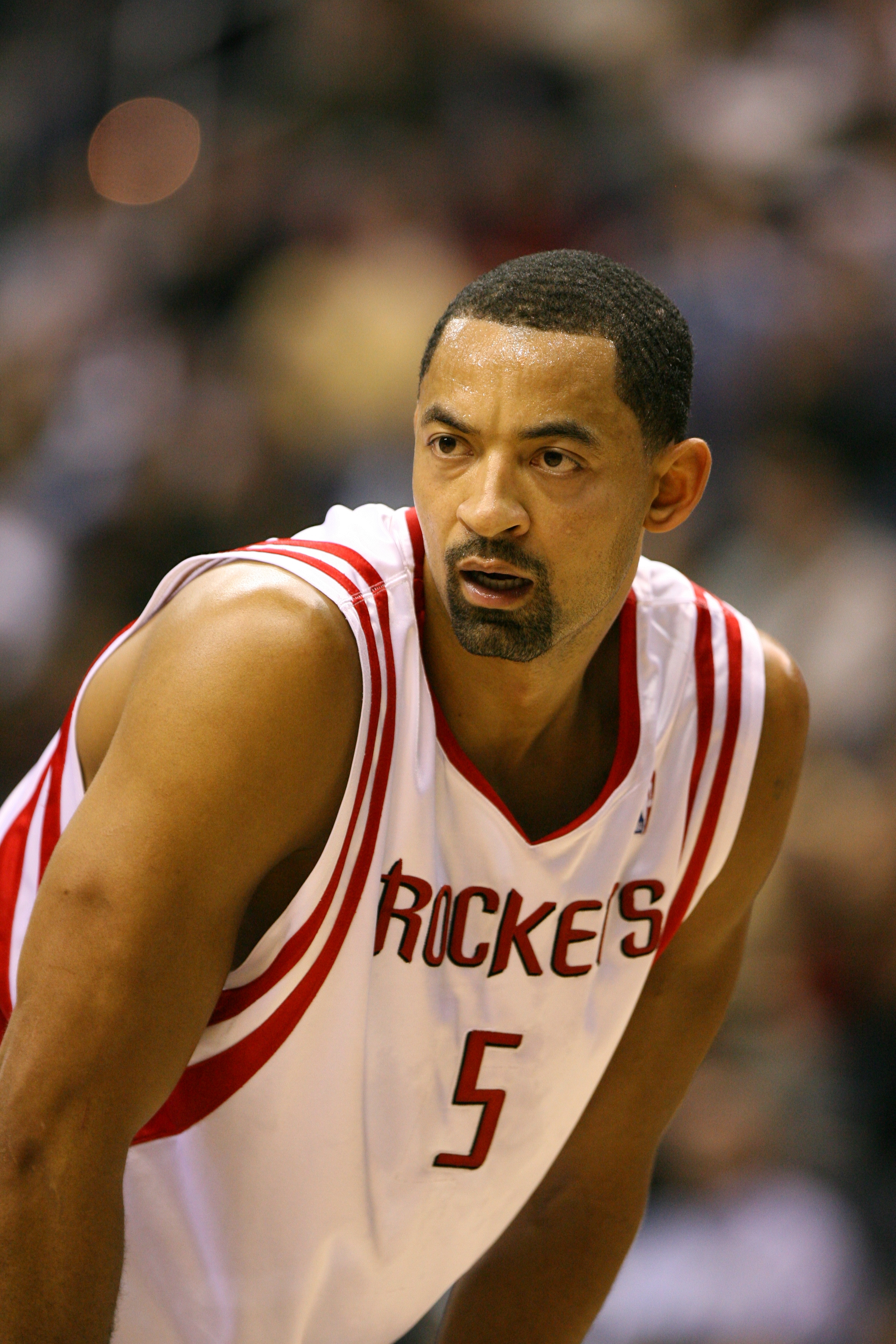
Juwan Howard was drafted fifth overall by the Washington Bullets in the 1994 NBA Draft.

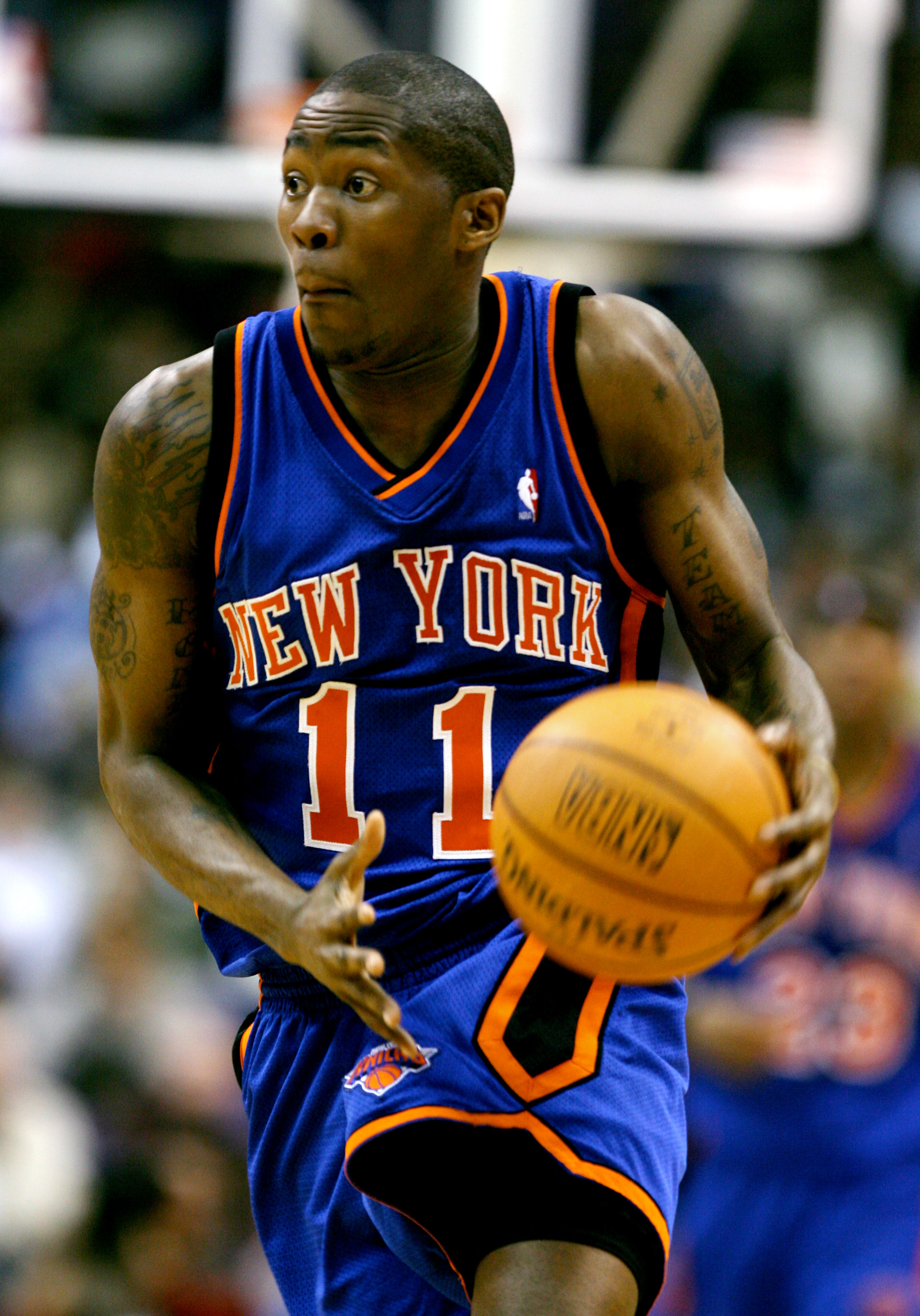
Jamal Crawford was drafted eighth overall by the Cleveland Cavaliers in the 2000 NBA Draft.

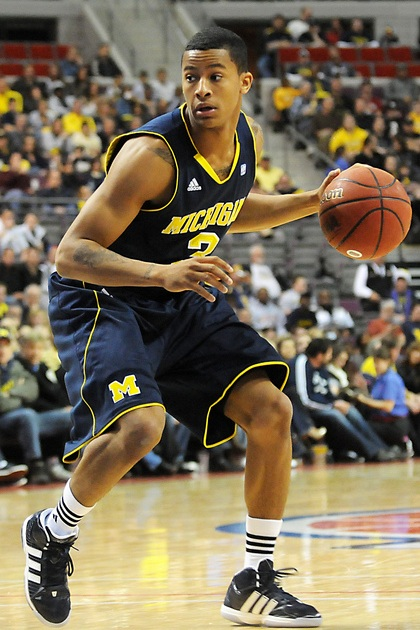
Trey Burke was drafted ninth overall by the Minnesota Timberwolves in the 2013 NBA Draft.

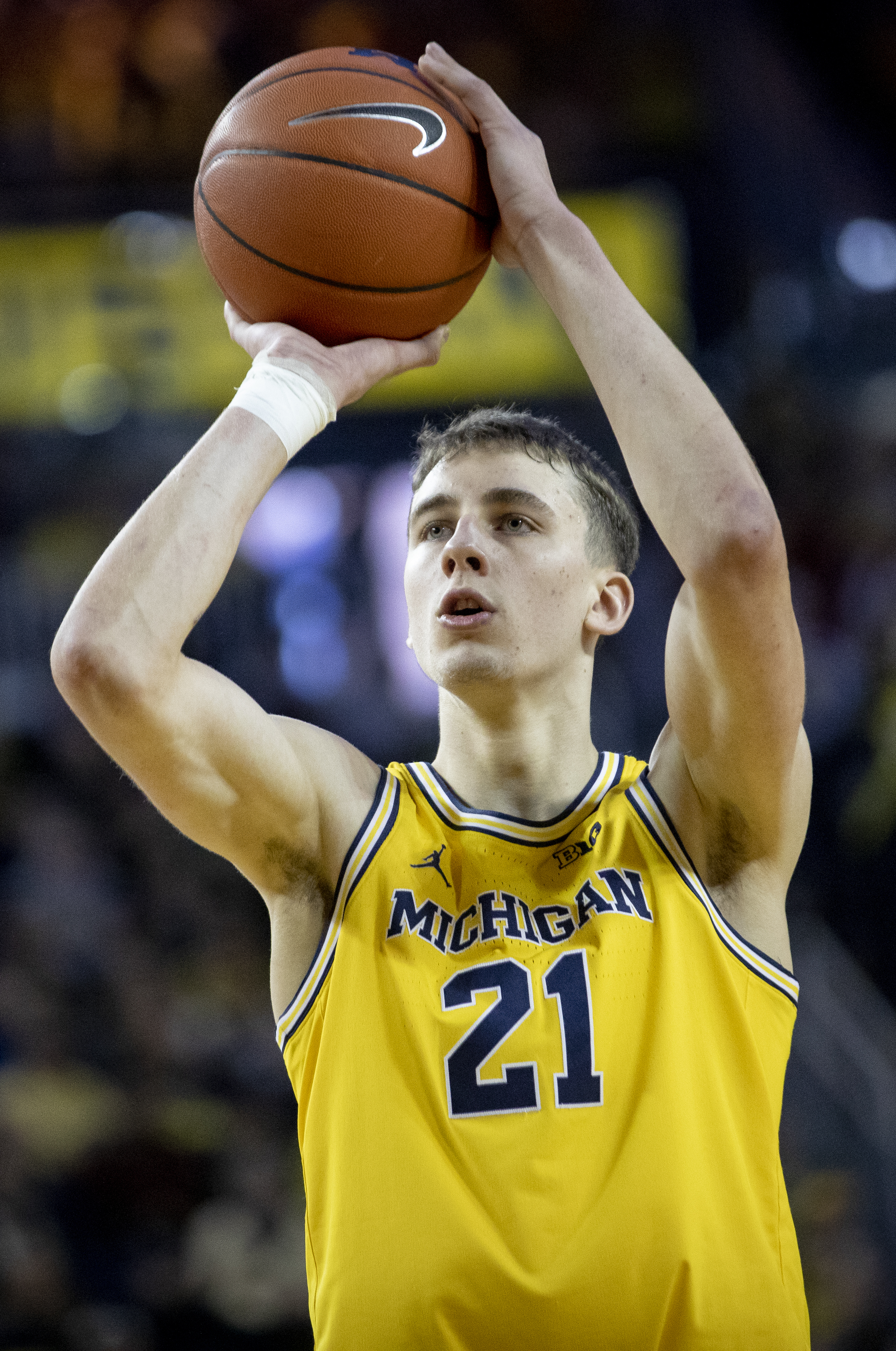
Franz Wagner was drafted eighth overall by the Orlando Magic in the 2021 NBA Draft.

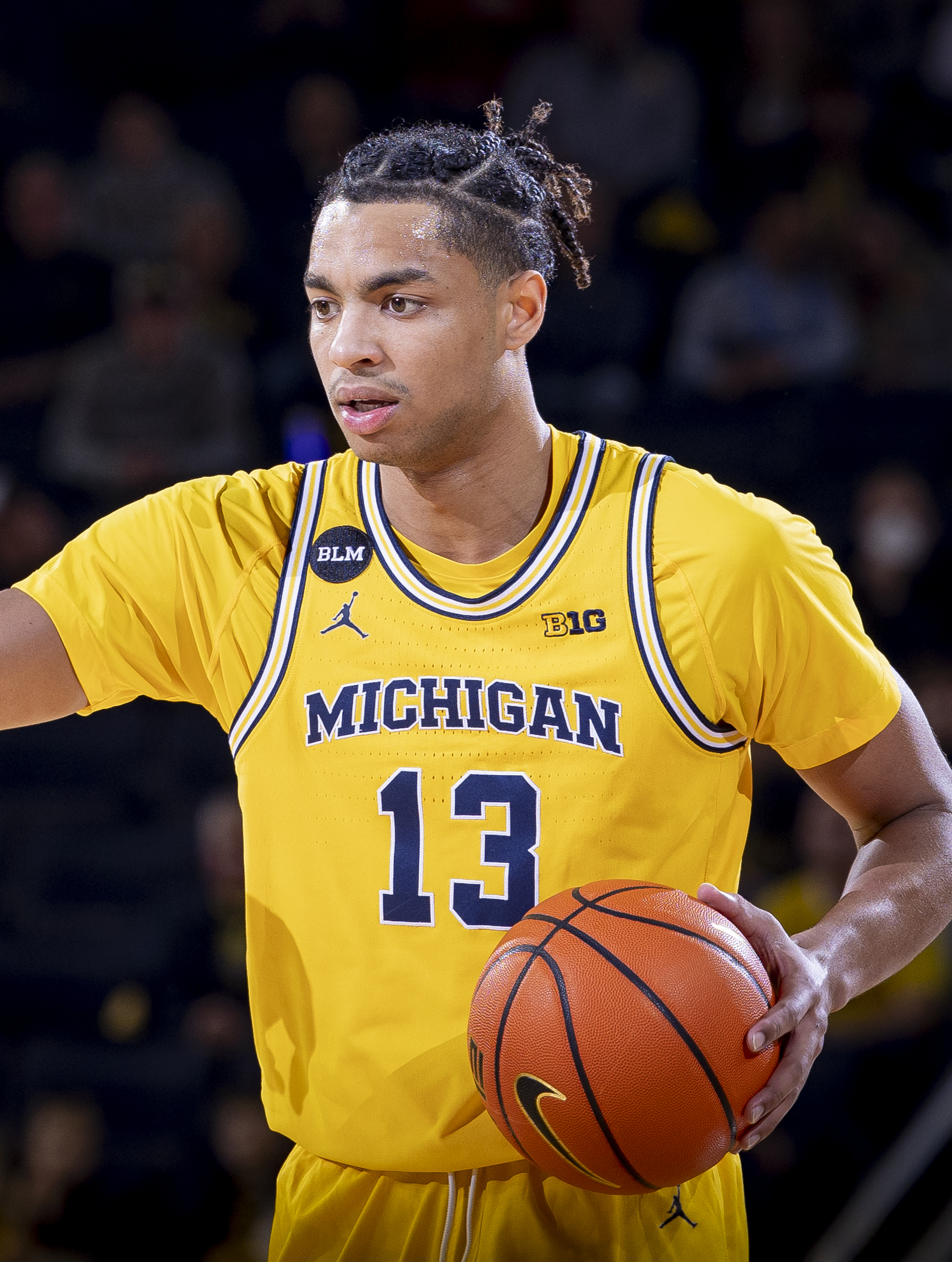
Jett Howard was drafted eleventh overall by the Orlando Magic in the 2023 NBA Draft.

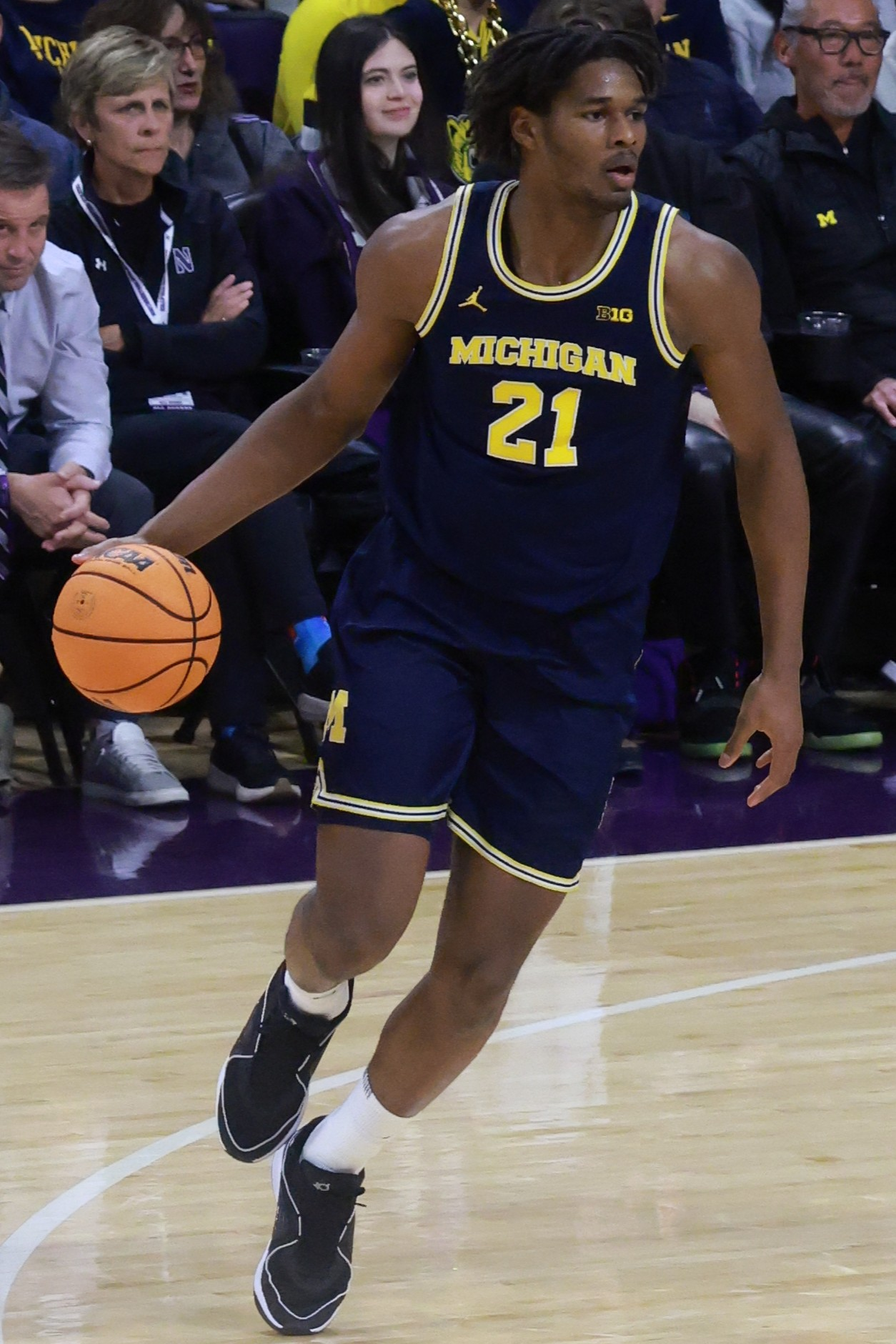
Morez Johnson Jr. was drafted ninth overall by the Dallas Mavericks in the 2026 NBA Draft.

== Players selected in the NBA draft ==
Michigan Wolverines players drafted
Year	Round	Pick	Overall	Name	Position	Team	Notes
1949	—	—	—	Bob Harrison^{‡}	G	Minneapolis Lakers	NBA All-Star (1956); NBA Champion (1950, 1952, 1953)
1950	6	10	70	Mack Supronowicz	F	Syracuse Nationals	—
1951	5	10	50	Leo VanderKuy	G, F	Minneapolis Lakers	—
1957	5	2	34	Ron Kramer	G	Fort Wayne Pistons	—
1957	7	3	51	George Ferguson	F	Minneapolis Lakers	—
1958	7	6	53	Pete Tillotson	C	Syracuse Nationals	—
1959	4	2	24	George Lee	G	Detroit Pistons	—
1959	11	2	73	M. C. Burton Jr.	G	Detroit Pistons	—
1961	4	6	38	John Tidwell	G	Philadelphia Warriors	—
1965	1	T	3	Bill Buntin	F, C	Detroit Pistons	—
1965	15	3	103	George Pomey	G, F	St. Louis Hawks	—
1966	1	1	1	Cazzie Russell^{‡}	G, F	New York Knicks	NBA All-Rookie First Team (1967); NBA All-Star (1972); NBA Champion (1970)
1966	3	2	22	Ollie Darden	F	Detroit Pistons	—
1967	4	11	42	Craig Dill	C	San Diego Rockets	—
1969	4	1	44	Dennis Stewart	F	Phoenix Suns	—
1970	1	2	2	Rudy Tomjanovich^{‡}	F	San Diego Rockets	NBA All-Star (1974, 1975, 1976, 1977, 1979); NBA Champion (1994, 1995) (as head coach); Naismith Memorial Basketball Hall of Fame Inductee (2020)
1971	10	16	168	Dan Fife	F	Milwaukee Bucks	—
1972	3	14	44	Wayne Grabiec	G	Boston Celtics	—
1973	4	9	61	Ken Brady	C	Detroit Pistons	—
1973	5	9	78	Henry Wilmore	C	Detroit Pistons	—
1973	14	1	189	Ernie Johnson	F	Philadelphia Sixers	—
1974	1	8	8	Campy Russell*	F	Cleveland Cavaliers	NBA All-Star (1979)
1975	4	2	56	C. J. Kupec	F, C	Los Angeles Lakers	—
1976	4	9	60	Wayman Britt	G	Los Angeles Lakers	—
1977	1	16	16	Rickey Green*	G	Golden State Warriors	NBA All-Star (1984)
1977	3	11	55	Steve Grote	G	Cleveland Cavaliers	—
1977	5	22	110	John Robinson	G	Los Angeles Lakers	—
1978	3	17	61	Dave Baxter	G	Seattle SuperSonics	—
1978	4	3	69	Joel Thompson	F	Houston Rockets	—
1979	1	15	15	Phil Hubbard	C	Detroit Pistons	—
1981	1	19	19	Mike McGee^{†}	G	Los Angeles Lakers	NBA Champion (1982, 1985)
1981	3	23	69	John Johnson	G	Boston Celtics	—
1981	5	20	112	Paul Heuerman	C	Phoenix Suns	—
1982	7	3	141	Thad Gardner	F	Utah Jazz	—
1983	10	7	213	Ike Person	C	Detroit Pistons	—
1984	1	12	12	Tim McCormick	C	Cleveland Cavaliers	—
1984	2	8	32	Eric Turner	G	Detroit Pistons	—
1984	10	19	225	Dan Pelekoudas	G	Detroit Pistons	—
1986	1	7	7	Roy Tarpley	F	Dallas Mavericks	NBA Sixth Man of the Year Award (1988); NBA All-Rookie First Team (1987)
1986	5	2	95	Richard Rellford	F	Indiana Pacers	—
1986	6	1	117	Butch Wade	F	New York Knicks	—
1986	7	5	144	Robert Henderson	F	Chicago Bulls	—
1987	6	20	134	Antoine Joubert	G	Detroit Pistons	—
1988	1	15	15	Gary Grant	G	Seattle SuperSonics	—
1989	1	4	4	Glen Rice^{‡}	F	Miami Heat	NBA All-Star (1996, 1997, 1998); NBA All-Star Game MVP (1997); NBA All-Rookie Second Team (1990); All-NBA Second Team (1997); All-NBA Third Team (1998); NBA Champion (2000)
1990	1	10	10	Rumeal Robinson	G	Atlanta Hawks	—
1990	1	13	13	Loy Vaught	F	Los Angeles Clippers	—
1990	1	16	16	Terry Mills	F	Milwaukee Bucks	—
1990	2	27	53	Sean Higgins	F	San Antonio Spurs	—
1993	1	1	1	Chris Webber*	F	Orlando Magic	NBA All-Star (1997, 2000, 2001, 2002, 2003); NBA Rookie of the Year (1994); NBA All-Rookie First Team (1994); All-NBA First Team (2001); All-NBA Second Team (1999, 2002, 2003); All-NBA Third Team (2000); Naismith Memorial Basketball Hall of Fame Inductee (2021)
1993	2	6	33	Eric Riley	C	Dallas Mavericks	—
1994	1	5	5	Juwan Howard^{‡}	F	Washington Wizards	NBA All-Star (1996); NBA Champion (2012, 2013); NBA All-Rookie Second Team (1995); All-NBA Third Team (1996)
1994	1	13	13	Jalen Rose	G	Denver Nuggets	NBA All-Rookie Second Team (1995); NBA Most Improved Player (2000)
1995	2	6	35	Jimmy King	G	Toronto Raptors	—
1997	1	14	14	Maurice Taylor	F	Los Angeles Clippers	NBA All-Rookie Second Team (1998)
1998	1	6	6	Robert Traylor	F	Dallas Mavericks	—
1998	2	29	58	Maceo Baston	F	Chicago Bulls	—
1999	2	13	42	Louis Bullock	G	Minnesota Timberwolves	—
2000	1	8	8	Jamal Crawford	G	Cleveland Cavaliers	NBA Sixth Man of the Year (2010, 2014, 2016)
2004	2	16	45	Bernard Robinson	G	Charlotte Hornets	—
2011	2	11	41	Darius Morris	G	Los Angeles Lakers	—
2013	1	9	9	Trey Burke	G	Minnesota Timberwolves	NBA All-Rookie First Team (2014)
2013	1	24	24	Tim Hardaway Jr.	G	New York Knicks	NBA All-Rookie First Team (2014)
2014	1	8	8	Nik Stauskas	G	Sacramento Kings	—
2014	1	21	21	Mitch McGary	C	Oklahoma City Thunder	—
2014	2	10	40	Glenn Robinson III	F	Minnesota Timberwolves	—
2016	1	20	20	Caris LeVert	G	Indiana Pacers	—
2017	1	17	17	D. J. Wilson	F	Milwaukee Bucks	—
2018	1	25	25	Moritz Wagner	F	Los Angeles Lakers	—
2019	1	28	28	Jordan Poole	G	Golden State Warriors	NBA Champion (2022)
2019	2	17	47	Ignas Brazdeikis	F	Sacramento Kings	–
2021	1	8	8	Franz Wagner	F	Orlando Magic	NBA All-Rookie First Team (2022)
2021	2	12	42	Isaiah Livers	F	Detroit Pistons	—
2022	2	2	32	Caleb Houstan	F	Orlando Magic	—
2022	2	13	43	Moussa Diabaté	F	Los Angeles Clippers	—
2023	1	11	11	Jett Howard	F	Orlando Magic	—
2023	1	15	15	Kobe Bufkin	G	Atlanta Hawks	—
2025	1	27	27	Danny Wolf	F	Brooklyn Nets	—
2026	1	9	9	Morez Johnson Jr.	F	Dallas Mavericks	—
2026	1	11	11	Yaxel Lendeborg	F	Golden State Warriors	—
2026	1	12	12	Aday Mara	C	Oklahoma City Thunder	—
