= 1948–49 Michigan Wolverines men's basketball team =

American college basketball season

1948–49 Michigan Wolverines men's basketball
- Conference: Big Ten Conference
- Record: 15–6 (7–5 Big Ten)
- Head coach: Ernie McCoy
- Captain: William Roberts
- Home arena: Yost Field House

1948–49 Big Nine Conference men's basketball standings
	Conf.				Overall
Team	W		L	PCT	W		L	PCT
No. 4 Illinois	10	–	2	.833	21	–	4	.840
No. 6 Minnesota	9	–	3	.750	18	–	3	.857
Michigan	7	–	5	.583	15	–	6	.714
No. 20 Ohio State	6	–	6	.500	14	–	7	.667
Indiana	6	–	6	.500	14	–	8	.636
Purdue	6	–	6	.500	13	–	9	.591
Wisconsin	5	–	7	.417	12	–	10	.545
Iowa	3	–	9	.250	10	–	10	.500
Northwestern	2	–	10	.167	5	–	16	.238
Rankings from AP Poll

The 1948–49 Michigan Wolverines men's basketball team represented the University of Michigan in intercollegiate basketball during the 1948–49 season. The team compiled a 15–6 record, and 7–5 against Big Ten Conference opponents. The team finished in third place in the Big Ten. Ernie McCoy was in his first season as the team's head coach, and William Roberts was the team captain.

Mack Supronowicz and Bob Harrison were the team's leading scorers with 247 and 214 points, respectively. Supronowicz's 247 points set a new Michigan single season scoring record, surpassing the previous record of 230 points set by James Mandler in the 1941–42 season. Supronowicz also became the first player in Michigan history to score 100 field goals in a season.

== Scoring statistics ==
Player	Games	Field goals	Free throws	Points	Points per game
Mack Supronowicz	21	100	57-88	247	11.8
Bob Harrison	21	83	48-69	214	10.2
Leo VanderKuy	21	44	53-75	141	6.7
Pete Elliott	21	49	25-35	123	5.9
Hal Morrill	21	32	21-27	85	4.0
Boyd McCaslin	21	26	21-40	73	3.5
Bill Mikulich	18	28	13-18	69	3.8
Bill Roberts	10	19	11-14	49	4.9
Irv Wisniewski	19	12	6-11	29	1.5
Bill Doyle	12	9	3-9	21	1.8
Bob Olson	7	6	2-5	12	1.7
Dick Rifenburg	5	2	5-6	9	1.8
Chuck Murray	5	1	5-6	7	1.4
Leslie Popp	2	0	0-0	0	0.0
Totals	21	411	268-407	1090	51.9

== Coaching staff ==
- Ernie McCoy - head coach
- Fritz Crisler - athletic director
