= 1949–50 Indiana Hoosiers men's basketball team =

American college basketball season

1949–50 Indiana Hoosiers men's basketball
- Conference: Big Ten Conference

Ranking
- AP: No. 20
- Record: 17–5 (7–5 Big Ten)
- Head coach: Branch McCracken (9th season)
- Assistant coach: Ernie Andres
- Captain: Lou Watson
- Home arena: The Fieldhouse

1949–50 Big Nine Conference men's basketball standings
	Conf.				Overall
Team	W		L	PCT	W		L	PCT
No. 2 Ohio State	11	–	1	.917	22	–	4	.846
No. 16 Wisconsin	9	–	3	.750	17	–	5	.773
No. 20 Indiana	7	–	5	.583	17	–	5	.773
Illinois	7	–	5	.583	14	–	8	.636
Iowa	6	–	6	.500	15	–	7	.682
Minnesota	4	–	8	.333	13	–	9	.591
Michigan	4	–	8	.333	11	–	11	.500
Northwestern	3	–	9	.250	10	–	12	.455
Purdue	3	–	9	.250	9	–	13	.409
Rankings from AP Poll

The 1949–50 Indiana Hoosiers men's basketball team represented Indiana University. Their head coach was Branch McCracken, who was in his 9th year. The team played its home games in The Fieldhouse in Bloomington, Indiana, and was a member of the Big Ten Conference.

The Hoosiers finished the regular season with an overall record of 17–5 and a conference record of 7–5, finishing 3rd in the Big Ten Conference. Indiana was not invited to participate in any postseason tournament.

== Roster ==
No.	Name	Position	Ht.	Year	Hometown
3	Jerry Stuteville	F	6–3	Sr.	Attica, Indiana
4	Dale Vieau	G	5–10	So.	Hammond, Indiana
5	Sam Miranda	G	5–10	So.	Collinsville, Illinois
6	Lou Watson	G	6–5	Sr.	Jeffersonville, Indiana
7	Gene Ring	G	6–1	Jr.	South Bend, Indiana
8	Bill Garrett	C	6–3	Jr.	Shelbyville, Indiana
9	Bob Masters	G	6–3	So.	Lafayette, Indiana
10	Charles Vaughn	F	5–11	So.	Lafayette, Indiana
11	Bill Tosheff	F	6–1	Jr.	Gary, Indiana
12	Phil Buck	F	5–10	Jr.	Rossville, Indiana
14	Hal Summers	F	6–1	So.	Lawrenceville, Illinois
15	Frank O'Bannon	G	5–10	So.	Corydon, Indiana
16	Don Luft	C	6–5	So.	Sheboygan, Wisconsin
17	Marvin Christie	F	6–1	So.	Indianapolis, Indiana
18	Tom Schwartz	C	6–6	Sr.	Kokomo, Indiana
19	Charley Meyer	C	6–5	Sr.	Jeffersonville, Indiana
21	Sheldon Turner	F	6–1	So.	Albany, Indiana
22	John Scott	F	6–1	So.	Madison, Indiana
24	Tyrie Robbins	F	6–3	Jr.	Gary, Indiana
25	Tony Hill	F	6–1	So.	Seymour, Indiana

== Schedule/results ==
Date time, TV	Rank^{#}	Opponent^{#}	Result	Record	Site city, state
Regular season
12/5/1949*		Wabash	W 64–33	1–0	The Fieldhouse; Bloomington, Indiana
12/10/1949*		at Michigan State	W 73–58	2–0	Jenison Fieldhouse; East Lansing, Michigan
12/13/1949*		DePaul	W 61–55	3–0	The Fieldhouse; Bloomington, Indiana
12/15/1949*		Arkansas	W 75–50	4–0	The Fieldhouse; Bloomington, Indiana
12/19/1949*		at Oregon State	W 65–60	5–0	Oregon State Coliseum; Corvallis, Oregon
12/20/1949*		at Oregon State	W 58–53	6–0	Oregon State Coliseum; Corvallis, Oregon
12/29/1949*		vs. Notre Dame; Hoosier Classic	W 79–69	7–0	Butler Fieldhouse; Indianapolis
12/30/1949*		at Butler; Hoosier Classic	W 68–57	8–0	Butler Fieldhouse; Indianapolis
1/2/1950*		Michigan State	W 60–50	9–0	The Fieldhouse; Bloomington, Indiana
1/7/1950	No. 5	Wisconsin	W 61–59	10–0 (1–0)	The Fieldhouse; Bloomington, Indiana
1/9/1950	No. 5	at Michigan	L 67–69	10–1 (1–1)	Yost Field House; Ann Arbor, Michigan
1/14/1950	No. 4	at Iowa	L 64–65	10–2 (1–2)	Iowa Field House; Iowa City, IA
1/16/1950*	No. 4	Butler	W 57–49	11–2 (1–2)	The Fieldhouse; Bloomington, Indiana
1/21/1950	No. 8	at Purdue; Rivalry	W 49–39	12–2 (2–2)	Lambert Fieldhouse; West Lafayette, Indiana
2/4/1950	No. 12	at Northwestern	W 64–59	13–2 (3–2)	Patten Gymnasium; Evanston, Illinois
2/6/1950	No. 12	Ohio State	L 55–56	13–3 (3–3)	The Fieldhouse; Bloomington, Indiana
2/11/1950	No. 16	Minnesota	W 59–39	14–3 (4–3)	The Fieldhouse; Bloomington, Indiana
2/13/1950	No. 16	at Illinois; Rivalry	W 83–72	15–3 (5–3)	Huff Hall; Champaign, Illinois
2/18/1950		Purdue; Rivalry	W 60–50	16–3 (6–3)	The Fieldhouse; Bloomington, Indiana
2/20/1950		at Ohio State	L 65–75	16–4 (6–4)	Ohio Expo Center Coliseum; Columbus, Ohio
2/25/1950	No. 17	Iowa	L 53–59	16–5 (6–5)	The Fieldhouse; Bloomington, Indiana
2/27/1950	No. 17	Illinois; Rivalry	W 80–66	17–5 (7–5)	The Fieldhouse; Bloomington, Indiana
*Non-conference game. ^{#}Rankings from AP Poll. (#) Tournament seedings in parentheses.
