= 1946–47 Michigan Wolverines men's basketball team =

American college basketball season

1946–47 Michigan Wolverines men's basketball
- Conference: Big Ten Conference
- Record: 12–8 (6–6 Big Ten)
- Head coach: Osborne Cowles
- Captain: Pete Elliott
- Home arena: Yost Field House

1946–47 Big Nine Conference men's basketball standings
	Conf.				Overall
Team	W		L	PCT	W		L	PCT
Wisconsin	9	–	3	.750	16	–	6	.727
Illinois	8	–	4	.667	14	–	6	.700
Indiana	8	–	4	.667	12	–	8	.600
Minnesota	7	–	5	.583	14	–	7	.667
Michigan	6	–	6	.500	12	–	8	.600
Iowa	5	–	7	.417	12	–	7	.632
Ohio State	5	–	7	.417	7	–	13	.350
Purdue	4	–	8	.333	9	–	11	.450
Northwestern	2	–	10	.167	7	–	13	.350

The 1946–47 Michigan Wolverines men's basketball team represented the University of Michigan in intercollegiate basketball during the 1946–47 season. The team finished the season in 5th place in the Big Ten Conference with an overall record of 12–8 and 6–6 against conference opponents.

Osborne Cowles was in his first year as the team's head coach. Mack Supronowicz was the team's leading scorer with 228 points in 20 games for an average of 11.4 points per game. Pete Elliott was the team captain.

== Statistical leaders ==
Player	Pos.	Yr	G	FG	FT	RB	Pts	PPG
Mack Supronowicz			20	93	52		228	11.4
Boyd McCaslin			20	70	38		178	8.9
Bob Harrison			20	62	31		155	7.8
Pete Elliott			20	32	26		90	4.5
Gerritt Wierda			18	22	18		62	3.4
William Mikulich			20	22	10		54	2.7
Totals			20	382	250		1012	50.6
