= 1948–49 Wisconsin Badgers men's basketball team =

American college basketball season

1948–49 Wisconsin Badgers men's basketball
- Conference: Big Ten Conference
- Record: 12–10 (5–7 Big Ten)
- Head coach: Harold E. Foster
- Home arena: UW Fieldhouse

1948–49 Big Nine Conference men's basketball standings
	Conf.				Overall
Team	W		L	PCT	W		L	PCT
No. 4 Illinois	10	–	2	.833	21	–	4	.840
No. 6 Minnesota	9	–	3	.750	18	–	3	.857
Michigan	7	–	5	.583	15	–	6	.714
No. 20 Ohio State	6	–	6	.500	14	–	7	.667
Indiana	6	–	6	.500	14	–	8	.636
Purdue	6	–	6	.500	13	–	9	.591
Wisconsin	5	–	7	.417	12	–	10	.545
Iowa	3	–	9	.250	10	–	10	.500
Northwestern	2	–	10	.167	5	–	16	.238
Rankings from AP Poll

The 1948–49 Wisconsin Badgers men's basketball team represented University of Wisconsin–Madison. The head coach was Harold E. Foster, coaching his fifteenth season with the Badgers. The team played their home games at the UW Fieldhouse in Madison, Wisconsin and was a member of the Big Nine Conference.

== Schedule ==
Date time, TV	Rank^{#}	Opponent^{#}	Result	Record	Site city, state
Regular Season
12/01/1948*		Ripon (WI)	W 66–36	1–0	UW Fieldhouse; Madison, WI
12/04/1948*		Marquette	W 67–63 ^{OT}	2–0	UW Fieldhouse; Madison, WI
12/09/1948*		Missouri	W 58–42	3–0	UW Fieldhouse; Madison, WI
12/11/1948*		Loyola (IL)	L 37–40	3–1	UW Fieldhouse; Madison, WI
12/13/1948*		at Notre Dame	L 54–60	3–2	Notre Dame Fieldhouse; Notre Dame, IN
12/21/1948*		at USC	L 31–36	3–3	Shrine Auditorium; Los Angeles, CA
12/23/1948*		at UCLA	W 49–46	4–3	Men's Gym; Los Angeles, CA
12/31/1948*		at Marquette	W 60–34	5–3	Marquette Gymnasium; Milwaukee, WI
1/03/1949		at Illinois	L 50–62	5–4 (0–1)	Huff Hall; Champaign, IL
1/08/1949*		Creighton	W 75–39	6–4	UW Fieldhouse; Madison, WI
1/10/1949		at Minnesota	L 33–47	6–5 (0–2)	Minnesota Field House; Minneapolis, MN
1/15/1949		Indiana	W 58–48	7–5 (1–2)	UW Fieldhouse; Madison, WI
1/17/1949		Ohio State	L 54–57	7–6 (1–3)	UW Fieldhouse; Madison, WI
2/05/1949		Illinois	L 54–61	7–7 (1–4)	UW Fieldhouse; Madison, WI
2/07/1949		at Michigan	L 38–40	7–8 (1–5)	Yost Field House; Ann Arbor, MI
2/12/1949		vs. Northwestern	W 56–52	8–8 (2–5)	Chicago Stadium; Chicago, IL
2/14/1949		at Purdue	L 48–53	8–9 (2–6)	Lambert Fieldhouse; West Lafayette, IN
2/19/1949		at Iowa	L 60–61	8–10 (2–7)	Iowa Field House; Iowa City, IA
2/21/1949		Northwestern	W 57–46	9–10 (3–7)	UW Fieldhouse; Madison, WI
2/26/1949*		Western Ontario	W 79–45	10–10	UW Fieldhouse; Madison, WI
2/28/1949		Iowa	W 70–47	11–10 (4–7)	UW Fieldhouse; Madison, WI
3/05/1949		Minnesota	W 45–43	12–10 (5–7)	UW Fieldhouse; Madison, WI
*Non-conference game. ^{#}Rankings from AP Poll. (#) Tournament seedings in parentheses.
