= 1946–47 Illinois Fighting Illini men's basketball team =

American college basketball season

1946–47 Illinois Fighting Illini men's basketball
- Conference: Big Ten Conference
- Record: 14–6 (8–4 Big Ten)
- Head coach: Douglas R. Mills (11th season)
- Assistant coaches: Howie Braun (10th season); Wally Roettger (12th season)
- MVP: Jack Smiley
- Captain: Selected each game
- Home arena: Huff Hall

1946–47 Big Nine Conference men's basketball standings
	Conf.				Overall
Team	W		L	PCT	W		L	PCT
Wisconsin	9	–	3	.750	16	–	6	.727
Illinois	8	–	4	.667	14	–	6	.700
Indiana	8	–	4	.667	12	–	8	.600
Minnesota	7	–	5	.583	14	–	7	.667
Michigan	6	–	6	.500	12	–	8	.600
Iowa	5	–	7	.417	12	–	7	.632
Ohio State	5	–	7	.417	7	–	13	.350
Purdue	4	–	8	.333	9	–	11	.450
Northwestern	2	–	10	.167	7	–	13	.350

The 1946–47 Illinois Fighting Illini men's basketball team represented the University of Illinois.

== Regular season ==
The 1946–47 season would be the last year that Doug Mills would be the head coach of the Fighting Illini, however; he would remain as the University of Illinois athletic director until 1966. During his tenure at the helm, Mills' coached 217 games over 11 seasons. Overall his teams won 151 games and lost only 66, the 151 wins remains 4th all-time in Illini history. During the Big Ten Conference season, Mills' teams won 88 games while losing only 47. Included in the 88 wins would be back-to-back conference titles in 1942 and 1943 where his teams would go 35–6 overall and 25–2 in the conference. Amazingly, Mills' three championships ('37, '42, '43) in just 11 years, place him just one behind Harry Combes, his replacement as head coach, for the most conference championships.

An attempt to regroup 'The Whiz Kids' occurred during the 1946–47 season when Ken Menke, Gene Vance, and Andy Phillip returned from their service in World War II. January also saw the return of All-American guard Walt Kirk from his time in military service. Additionally, Dike Eddleman was not available to play until January based on the football team playing in the Rose Bowl. Unfortunately, the chemistry was not the same and the team finished in a tie for second in the conference with a record of 8 wins, 4 losses. Overall, the team finished with a 14–6 record. The starting lineup at the beginning of the season included 4 of the 5 Whiz Kids, guards Smiley and Vance, forwards Phillip and Ken Menke and Fred Green at center. However, as January unfolded, Mills would insert Kirk and freshman Bill Erickson into the starting lineup as well.

=== Roster ===
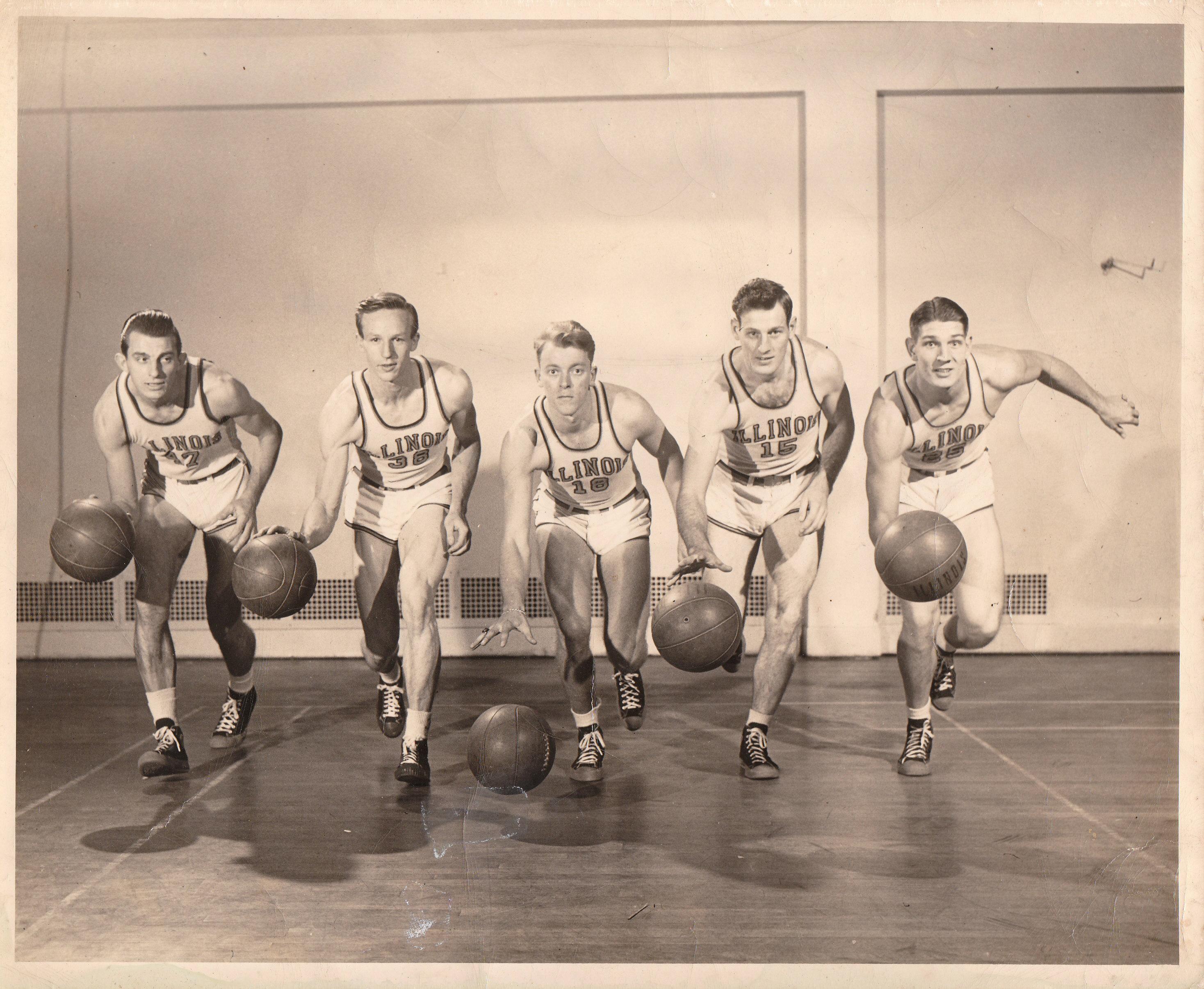
1946–47 Illinois Starting Five.

1946–47 Illinois Fighting Illini men's basketball team
Players
Coaches

Pos.	#	Name	Height	Weight	Year	Previous school	Hometown
C	7	Robert Menke	6 ft 3 in (1.91 m)	185 lb (84 kg)	So	Elgin High School	Elgin, Illinois
F	8	Roy Gatewood	6 ft 2 in (1.88 m)	182 lb (83 kg)	Fr	Salem High School	Salem, Illinois
G	9	Dick Foley	6 ft 0 in (1.83 m)	155 lb (70 kg)	So	Paris High School	Paris, Illinois
F	10	Bill Edwards	6 ft 2 in (1.88 m)	180 lb (82 kg)	So	Paris High School	Paris, Illinois
G	11	Jack Burmaster	6 ft 2 in (1.88 m)	182 lb (83 kg)	Jr	Elgin High School	Elgin, Illinois
G	13	Walt Kirk	6 ft 3 in (1.91 m)	175 lb (79 kg)	Sr	Mt. Vernon High School	Mt. Vernon, Illinois
G	15	Arthur Smiley	6 ft 3 in (1.91 m)	195 lb (88 kg)	Sr	Waterman High School	Waterman, Illinois
F	16	Robert Doster	6 ft 1 in (1.85 m)	165 lb (75 kg)	So	Decatur High School	Decatur, Illinois
C	19	Robert Rowe	6 ft 7 in (2.01 m)	200 lb (91 kg)	So	Warren High School	Warren, Illinois
F	21	Ray DeMoulin	6 ft 1 in (1.85 m)	170 lb (77 kg)	So	Mulberry Grove High School	Mulberry Grove, Illinois
F	24	Burdette Thurlby	6 ft 2 in (1.88 m)	170 lb (77 kg)	Fr	Kirkland High School	Kirkland, Illinois
G	25	Ellis Vance	6 ft 3 in (1.91 m)	196 lb (89 kg)	Sr	Clinton High School	Clinton, Illinois
F	26	Chet Trost	6 ft 3 in (1.91 m)	175 lb (79 kg)	So	Champaign Central High School	Champaign, Illinois
F	27	Hal Craig	6 ft 0 in (1.83 m)	160 lb (73 kg)	Jr	Decatur High School	Decatur, Illinois
F	29	Dwight Humphrey	5 ft 9 in (1.75 m)	145 lb (66 kg)	So	Moline High School	Moline, Illinois
C	30	Walter Osterkorn	6 ft 4 in (1.93 m)	195 lb (88 kg)	Fr	Amundsen High School	Chicago, Illinois
G	31	Stanley Fronczak	6 ft 2 in (1.88 m)	190 lb (86 kg)	Jr	Brooklyn High School	Brooklyn, New York
F	33	Bill Erickson	6 ft 1 in (1.85 m)	173 lb (78 kg)	Fr	East High School	Rockford, Illinois
F	34	Benton Odum	6 ft 0 in (1.83 m)	172 lb (78 kg)	Fr	Marion High School	Marion, Illinois
F	36	Jim Marks	6 ft 2 in (1.88 m)	175 lb (79 kg)	Fr	Edwardsville High School	Edwardsville, Illinois
F	38	Ken Menke	6 ft 0 in (1.83 m)	172 lb (78 kg)	Sr	Dundee High School	Dundee, Illinois
C	39	Bob Lavoy	6 ft 6 in (1.98 m)	185 lb (84 kg)	Fr	West Aurora High School	Aurora, Illinois
F	40	Dwight Eddleman	6 ft 2 in (1.88 m)	190 lb (86 kg)	So	Centralia High School	Centralia, Illinois
F	47	Andrew Phillip	6 ft 2 in (1.88 m)	184 lb (83 kg)	Sr	Granite City High School	Granite City, Illinois
C	48	Fred Green	6 ft 7 in (2.01 m)	210 lb (95 kg)	So	Urbana High School	Urbana, Illinois

Head coach

- Douglas Mills (University of Illinois) (11th year)

Assistant coach(es)

- Wally Roettger (University of Illinois) (12th year)
- Howie Braun (University of Illinois) (10th year)

Legend

- (C) Team captain
- (S) Suspended
- (I) Ineligible
- (W) Walk-on
- Injured
- Current redshirt

Roster

== Schedule ==
Date time, TV	Rank^{#}	Opponent^{#}	Result	Record	Site (attendance) city, state
Non-Conference regular season
12/6/1946*		Cornell	W 87–39	1–0	Huff Hall (7,892); Champaign, IL
12/11/1946*		Marquette	W 73–40	2–0	Huff Hall (7,697); Champaign, IL
12/14/1946*		Pittsburgh	W 58–31	3–0	Huff Hall (7,855); Champaign, IL
12/16/1946*		vs. Missouri; Rivalry	L 50–55	3–1	Municipal Auditorium (4,470); Kansas City, MO
12/20/1946*		at California	W 58–41	4–1	Haas Pavilion (7,000); Berkeley, CA
12/21/1946*		at California	L 35–53	4–2	Haas Pavilion (7,000); Berkeley, CA
12/28/1946*		Nebraska	W 72–37	5–2	Huff Hall (–); Champaign, IL
Big Ten regular season
1/1/1947		at Wisconsin	L 47–53	5–3 (0–1)	Wisconsin Field House (7,900); Madison, WI
1/4/1947*		University of Mexico	W 94–36	6–3	Huff Hall (7,851); Champaign, IL
1/6/1947		Minnesota	L 31–34	6–4 (0–2)	Huff Hall (7,875); Champaign, IL
1/11/1947		Northwestern; Rivalry	W 55–40	7–4 (1–2)	Huff Hall (6,600); Champaign, IL
1/13/1947		Ohio State	W 61–42	8–4 (2–2)	Huff Hall (7,600); Champaign, IL
1/25/1947		Wisconsin	W 63–37	9–4 (3–2)	Huff Hall (7,685); Champaign, IL
2/1/1947		at Ohio State	W 59–58	10–4 (4–2)	Ohio Expo Center Coliseum (–); Columbus, OH
2/5/1947		at Purdue	L 42–51	10–5 (4–3)	Lambert Fieldhouse (11,000); West Lafayette, IN
2/8/1947*		Iowa; Rivalry	W 45–36	11–5 (5–3)	Huff Hall (7,879); Champaign, IL
2/15/1947		Indiana; Rivalry	W 59–50	12–5 (6–3)	Huff Hall (7,874); Champaign, IL
2/22/1947		at Northwestern; Rivalry	W 52–51	13–5 (7–3)	Chicago Stadium (24,000); Chicago, IL
2/24/1947		at Michigan	W 45–36	14–5 (8–3)	Yost Field House (–); Ann Arbor, MI
3/1/1947		at Indiana; Rivalry	L 41–48	14–6 (8–4)	The Field House (–); Bloomington, IN
*Non-conference game. ^{#}Rankings from AP Poll. (#) Tournament seedings in parentheses. All times are in Central Time.

== Player stats ==
Player	Games played	Field goals	Free throws	Points
Andy Phillip	20	81	30	192
Ken Menke	20	72	36	180
Fred Green	20	72	25	169
Jack Smiley	20	56	38	150
Gene Vance	20	49	37	135
Walt Kirk	19	31	22	84
Bill Erickson	20	27	7	61
Jack Burmaster	15	15	4	34
Bob Doster	12	12	7	31
Dick Foley	16	11	4	26
Bob Lavoy	11	7	11	25
Dwight Eddleman	10	5	2	12
Benton Odum	2	4	3	11
Dwight Humphrey	11	4	0	8
Wally Osterkorn	8	1	4	6
Ron Bontemps	4	0	2	2
Burdette Thurlby	4	0	1	1
Robert Rowe	5	0	0	0
Roy Gatewood	2	0	0	0

== Awards and honors ==
- Dwight Eddleman
  - Fighting Illini All-Century team (2005)
- Andy Phillip
  - True Magazine 1st team All-American (1947)
  - National Association of Basketball Coaches 1st team All-American (1947)
  - Consensus 2nd team All-American (1947)
  - Converse Honorable Mention All-American (1947)
  - Naismith Memorial Basketball Hall of Fame (1961)
- Jack Smiley
  - Helms 3rd Team All-American (1947)
  - Converse Honorable Mention All-American (1947)
  - Team Most Valuable Player
- Gene Vance
  - Converse Honorable Mention All-American (1947)
