= 1946–47 Wisconsin Badgers men's basketball team =

American college basketball season

1946–47 Wisconsin Badgers men's basketball

Big Ten Conference Champions

NCAA Men's Division I Tournament East Regional Third Place, W, 50–49 vs. Navy
- Conference: Big Ten Conference
- Record: 16–6 (9–3 Big Ten)
- Head coach: Harold E. Foster
- Home arena: UW Fieldhouse

1946–47 Big Nine Conference men's basketball standings
	Conf.				Overall
Team	W		L	PCT	W		L	PCT
Wisconsin	9	–	3	.750	16	–	6	.727
Illinois	8	–	4	.667	14	–	6	.700
Indiana	8	–	4	.667	12	–	8	.600
Minnesota	7	–	5	.583	14	–	7	.667
Michigan	6	–	6	.500	12	–	8	.600
Iowa	5	–	7	.417	12	–	7	.632
Ohio State	5	–	7	.417	7	–	13	.350
Purdue	4	–	8	.333	9	–	11	.450
Northwestern	2	–	10	.167	7	–	13	.350

The 1946–47 Wisconsin Badgers men's basketball team represented University of Wisconsin–Madison. The head coach was Harold E. Foster, coaching his thirteenth season with the Badgers. The team played their home games at the UW Fieldhouse in Madison, Wisconsin and was a member of the Big Nine Conference.

== Schedule ==
Date time, TV	Rank^{#}	Opponent^{#}	Result	Record	Site city, state
Regular Season
12/02/1946*		Lawrence (WI)	W 61–43	1–0	UW Fieldhouse; Madison, WI
12/07/1946*		Marquette	W 65–51	2–0	UW Fieldhouse; Madison, WI
12/09/1946*		at Butler	W 60–52	3–0	Butler Fieldhouse; Indianapolis, IN
12/14/1946*		Notre Dame	W 53–49 ^{OT}	4–0	UW Fieldhouse; Madison, WI
12/18/1946*		Oklahoma	L 40–56	4–1	UW Fieldhouse; Madison, WI
12/21/1946*		at Marquette	L 47–55	4–2	Marquette Gymnasium; Milwaukee, WI
12/23/1946*		Southern California	W 61–56	5–2	UW Fieldhouse; Madison, WI
1/01/1947		Illinois	W 53–47	6–2 (1–0)	UW Fieldhouse; Madison, WI
1/04/1947		at Iowa	W 63–62	7–2 (2–0)	Iowa Field House; Iowa City, IA
1/11/1947		Indiana	W 70–49	8–2 (3–0)	UW Fieldhouse; Madison, WI
1/20/1947*		at Michigan State	W 58–48	9–2	Jenison Fieldhouse; East Lansing, MI
1/25/1947		at Illinois	L 37–63	9–3 (3–1)	Huff Hall; Champaign, IL
1/27/1947		Northwestern	W 45–44	10–3 (4–1)	UW Fieldhouse; Madison, WI
2/03/1947		Iowa	W 60–53	11–3 (5–1)	UW Fieldhouse; Madison, WI
2/08/1947		Minnesota	W 60–51	12–3 (6–1)	UW Fieldhouse; Madison, WI
2/10/1947		at Michigan	W 52–51	13–3 (7–1)	Yost Field House; Ann Arbor, MI
2/15/1947		vs. Northwestern	W 54–42	14–3 (8–1)	Chicago Stadium; Chicago, IL
2/22/1947		Ohio State	L 56–57	14–4 (8–2)	UW Fieldhouse; Madison, WI
2/24/1947		at Purdue	W 72–60	15–4 (9–2)	Purdue Fieldhouse; West Lafayette, IN
3/01/1947		at Minnesota	L 55–58	15–5 (9–3)	Minnesota Field House; Minneapolis, MN
NCAA Tournament
3/20/1947*		vs. City College of New York; East Regional - Quarterfinals	L 56-70	15–6	Madison Square Garden; New York, NY
3/22/1947*		vs. Navy; East Regional - Third-place game	W 50–49	16–6	Madison Square Garden; New York, NY
*Non-conference game. ^{#}Rankings from AP Poll. (#) Tournament seedings in parentheses.
