= 1949–50 Wisconsin Badgers men's basketball team =

American college basketball season

1949–50 Wisconsin Badgers men's basketball
- Conference: Big Ten Conference

Ranking
- AP: No. 16
- Record: 17–5 (9–3 Big Ten)
- Head coach: Harold E. Foster
- Home arena: UW Fieldhouse

1949–50 Big Nine Conference men's basketball standings
	Conf.				Overall
Team	W		L	PCT	W		L	PCT
No. 2 Ohio State	11	–	1	.917	22	–	4	.846
No. 16 Wisconsin	9	–	3	.750	17	–	5	.773
No. 20 Indiana	7	–	5	.583	17	–	5	.773
Illinois	7	–	5	.583	14	–	8	.636
Iowa	6	–	6	.500	15	–	7	.682
Minnesota	4	–	8	.333	13	–	9	.591
Michigan	4	–	8	.333	11	–	11	.500
Northwestern	3	–	9	.250	10	–	12	.455
Purdue	3	–	9	.250	9	–	13	.409
Rankings from AP Poll

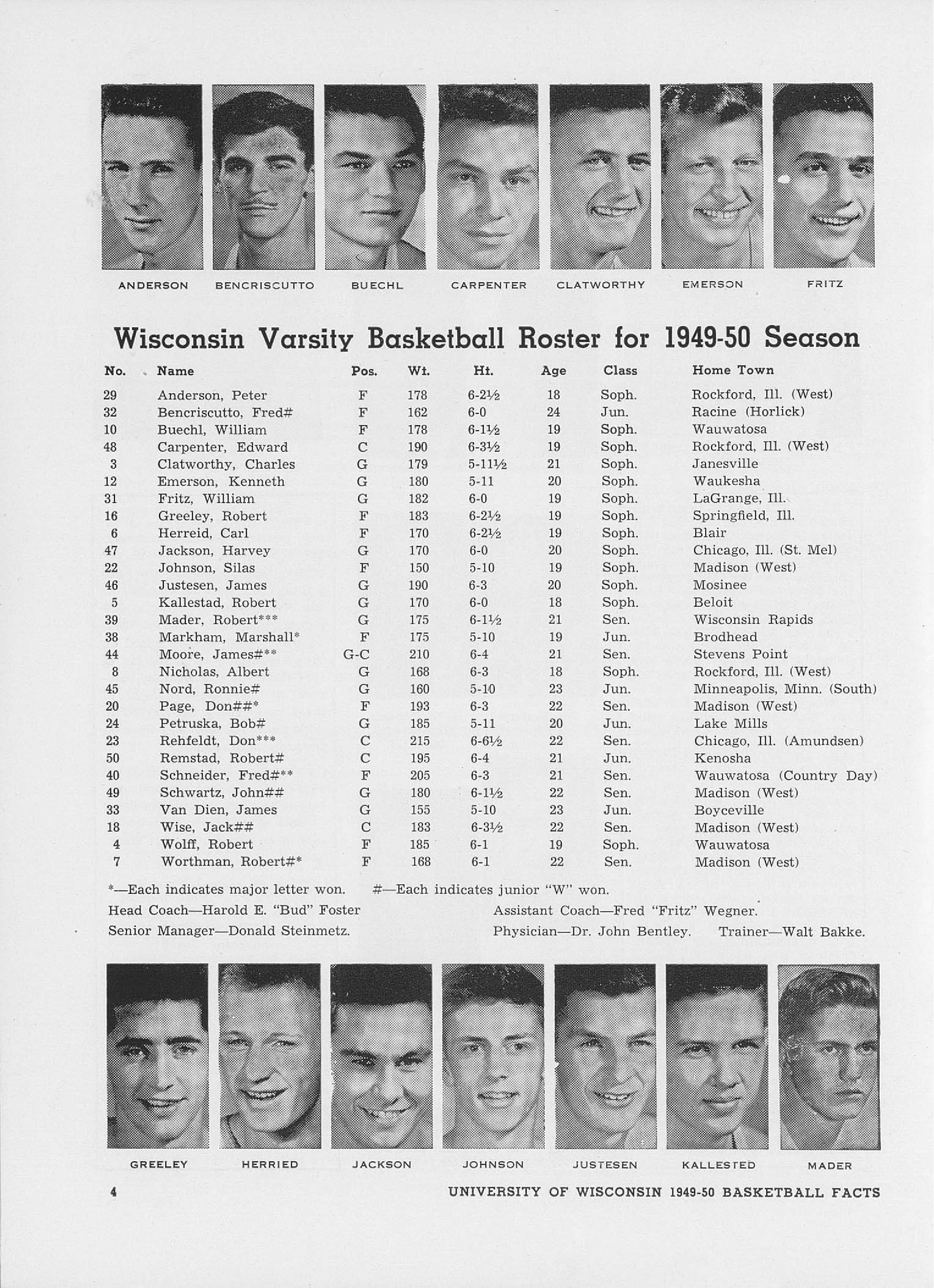
The 1949–50 roster, as seen in the team's media guide

The 1949–50 Wisconsin Badgers men's basketball team represented University of Wisconsin–Madison. The head coach was Harold E. Foster, coaching his sixteenth season with the Badgers. The team played their home games at the UW Fieldhouse in Madison, Wisconsin and was a member of the Big Ten Conference.

== Schedule ==
Date time, TV	Rank^{#}	Opponent^{#}	Result	Record	Site city, state
Regular Season
12/03/1949*		Marquette	W 63–48	1–0	UW Fieldhouse; Madison, Wisconsin
12/06/1949*		Kansas State	W 56–48	2–0	UW Fieldhouse; Madison, Wisconsin
12/08/1949*		Oregon State	L 36–49	2–1	UW Fieldhouse; Madison, Wisconsin
12/10/1949*		at Loyola (IL)	W 68–55	3–1	Alumni Gym; Chicago
12/13/1949*		Notre Dame	W 56–48	4–1	UW Fieldhouse; Madison, Wisconsin
12/17/1949*		at Marquette	W 62–45	5–1	Marquette Gymnasium; Milwaukee
12/20/1949*		at Missouri	L 48–50	5–2	Brewer Fieldhouse; Columbia, Missouri
12/28/1949*		vs. Rutgers	W 68–55	6–2	Iowa Field House; Iowa City, IA
12/30/1949*		UCLA	W 54–52	7–2	UW Fieldhouse; Madison, Wisconsin
1/02/1950		Illinois	W 59–50	8–2 (1–0)	UW Fieldhouse; Madison, Wisconsin
1/07/1950	No. 15	at Indiana	L 59–61	8–3 (1–1)	IU Fieldhouse; Bloomington, Indiana
1/14/1950		Michigan	W 53–41	9–3 (2–1)	UW Fieldhouse; Madison, Wisconsin
1/16/1950		Minnesota	W 57–54	10–3 (3–1)	UW Fieldhouse; Madison, Wisconsin
2/04/1950	No. 17	at Ohio State	L 47–61	10–4 (3–2)	Ohio Expo Center Coliseum; Columbus, Ohio
2/06/1950*		at Michigan State	W 66–47	11–4	Jenison Fieldhouse; East Lansing, Michigan
2/11/1950		vs. Northwestern	W 66–59	12–4 (4–2)	Chicago Stadium; Chicago
2/13/1950		at Iowa	W 66–62 ^{OT}	13–4 (5–2)	Iowa Field House; Iowa City, IA
2/18/1950		Iowa	W 53–44	14–4 (6–2)	UW Fieldhouse; Madison, Wisconsin
2/20/1950		Purdue	W 56–45	15–4 (7–2)	UW Fieldhouse; Madison, Wisconsin
2/25/1950		at Illinois	L 58–76	15–5 (7–3)	Huff Hall; Champaign, Illinois
2/27/1950		Northwestern	W 67–53	16–5 (8–3)	UW Fieldhouse; Madison, Wisconsin
3/04/1950		at Minnesota	W 60–54	17–5 (9–3)	Minnesota Field House; Minneapolis
*Non-conference game. ^{#}Rankings from AP Poll. (#) Tournament seedings in parentheses.
