= 1948–49 Illinois Fighting Illini men's basketball team =

American college basketball season

1948–49 Illinois Fighting Illini men's basketball

Big Ten Conference champions

NCAA men's Division I tournament, Final Four
- Conference: Big Ten Conference

Ranking
- AP: No. 4
- Record: 21–4 (10–2 Big Ten)
- Head coach: Harry Combes (2nd season)
- Assistant coaches: Howie Braun (12th season); Wally Roettger (14th season)
- MVP: Dike Eddleman
- Captain: Dike Eddleman
- Home arena: Huff Hall

1948–49 Big Nine Conference men's basketball standings
	Conf.				Overall
Team	W		L	PCT	W		L	PCT
No. 4 Illinois	10	–	2	.833	21	–	4	.840
No. 6 Minnesota	9	–	3	.750	18	–	3	.857
Michigan	7	–	5	.583	15	–	6	.714
No. 20 Ohio State	6	–	6	.500	14	–	7	.667
Indiana	6	–	6	.500	14	–	8	.636
Purdue	6	–	6	.500	13	–	9	.591
Wisconsin	5	–	7	.417	12	–	10	.545
Iowa	3	–	9	.250	10	–	10	.500
Northwestern	2	–	10	.167	5	–	16	.238
Rankings from AP Poll

"1948-49 Fighting Illini men's basketball team"

The 1948–49 Illinois Fighting Illini men's basketball team represented the University of Illinois.

== Regular season ==
The 1948-49 squad, led by Dike Eddleman, Bill Erickson, and Walter Osterkorn, was Illinois’ first 20-game winner since 1908, finishing 21-4. Illinois beat Yale, 71-67, to advance to a national semifinal showdown with Kentucky at Madison Square Garden in New York City. The Illini fell to the Wildcats, 76-47, forcing Illinois to defeat Oregon State, 57-53, in Seattle for third place.

=== Roster ===
1948–49 Illinois Fighting Illini men's basketball team
Players
Coaches

Pos.	#	Name	Height	Weight	Year	Previous school	Hometown
G	7	Jim Cottrell	5 ft 10 in (1.78 m)	167 lb (76 kg)	So	Champaign Central High School	Champaign, Illinois
F	8	Roy Gatewood	6 ft 2 in (1.88 m)	174 lb (79 kg)	Jr	Salem High School	Salem, Illinois
G	9	Dick Foley	6 ft 0 in (1.83 m)	165 lb (75 kg)	Sr	Paris High School	Paris, Illinois
C	10	Bill Boyer	6 ft 4 in (1.93 m)	190 lb (86 kg)	So	Beardstown High School	Beardstown, Illinois
G	11	Don Sunderlage	6 ft 0 in (1.83 m)	180 lb (82 kg)	So	Elgin High School	Elgin, Illinois
G	12	Richard Brogren	5 ft 11 in (1.8 m)	175 lb (79 kg)	So	East High School	Rockford, Illinois
C	13	Walter Osterkorn	6 ft 4.5 in (1.94 m)	207 lb (94 kg)	Jr	Amundsen High School	Chicago, Illinois
F	14	Burdette Thurlby	6 ft 2 in (1.88 m)	180 lb (82 kg)	Jr	Kirkland High School	Kirkland, Illinois
G	15	Paul Eckert	6 ft 1 in (1.85 m)	178 lb (81 kg)	So	Herrin High School	Herrin, Illinois
C	21	Walt Kersulis	6 ft 4 in (1.93 m)	197 lb (89 kg)	Jr	East St. Louis Senior High School	East St. Louis, Illinois
F	22	Van Anderson	6 ft 2 in (1.88 m)	185 lb (84 kg)	Jr	Sullivan Community High School	Sullivan, Illinois
F	23	Ted Beach	6 ft 1 in (1.85 m)	165 lb (75 kg)	So	Champaign Central High School	Champaign, Illinois
F	24	Benton Odum	6 ft 0.5 in (1.84 m)	175 lb (79 kg)	Jr	Marion High School	Marion, Illinois
F	27	Jim Marks	6 ft 2 in (1.88 m)	177 lb (80 kg)	Sr	Edwardsville High School	Edwardsville, Illinois
F	30	Glen Trugillo	5 ft 11 in (1.8 m)	160 lb (73 kg)	So	East High School	Rockford, Illinois
G	31	Bill Hoffman	6 ft 0 in (1.83 m)	175 lb (79 kg)	So	Wells High School	Chicago, Illinois
G	33	Bill Erickson	6 ft 1 in (1.85 m)	184 lb (83 kg)	Jr	East High School	Rockford, Illinois
C	36	Al Leavitt	6 ft 5 in (1.96 m)	230 lb (104 kg)	So	Sullivan High School	Chicago, Illinois
F	40	Dwight Eddleman (C)	6 ft 2 in (1.88 m)	189 lb (86 kg)	Sr	Centralia High School	Centralia, Illinois
C	48	Fred Green	6 ft 7 in (2.01 m)	208 lb (94 kg)	Sr	Urbana High School	Urbana, Illinois

Head coach

- Harry Combes (University of Illinois) (2nd year)

Assistant coach(es)

- Wally Roettger (University of Illinois) (14th year)
- Howie Braun (University of Illinois) (12th year)

Legend

- (C) Team captain
- (S) Suspended
- (I) Ineligible
- (W) Walk-on
- Injured
- Current redshirt

Roster

== Schedule ==
Date time, TV	Rank^{#}	Opponent^{#}	Result	Record	Site (attendance) city, state
Non-Conference regular season
12/3/1948*		Butler	W 67–62	1–0	Huff Hall (–); Champaign, IL
12/8/1948*		at Notre Dame	W 59–58 ^{OT}	2–0	Notre Dame Fieldhouse (–); Notre Dame, IN
12/11/1948*		vs. DePaul	L 50–60	2–1	Chicago Stadium (17,189); Chicago, IL
12/13/1948*		Oklahoma	W 73–68	3–1	Huff Hall (6,902); Champaign, IL
12/18/1948*		Pennsylvania	W 80–61	4–1	Huff Hall (3,943); Champaign, IL
12/20/1948*		DePaul	W 89–51	5–1	Huff Hall (6,013); Champaign, IL
12/21/1948*		Cornell	W 71–47	6–1	Huff Hall (3,042); Champaign, IL
12/29/1948*		Colgate	W 77–54	7–1	Huff Hall (4,541); Champaign, IL
12/30/1948*		Colgate	W 85–55	8–1	Huff Hall (3,880); Champaign, IL
Big Ten regular season
1/3/1949		Wisconsin	W 62–50	9–1 (1–0)	Huff Hall (–); Champaign, IL
1/8/1949		at Indiana; Rivalry	W 44–42 ^{2OT}	10–1 (2–0)	The Field House (10,000); Bloomington, IN
1/10/1949		at Ohio State	W 64–63	11–1 (3–0)	Ohio Expo Center Coliseum (6,958); Columbus, OH
1/15/1949*		Creighton	W 96–30	12–1	Huff Hall (6,958); Champaign, IL
1/29/1949	No. 7	No. 4 Minnesota	W 45–44	13–1 (4–0)	Huff Hall (6,905); Champaign, IL
1/31/1949	No. 6	at Purdue	L 53–55	13–2 (4–1)	Lambert Fieldhouse (10,000); West Lafayette, IN
2/5/1949	No. 4	at Wisconsin	W 61–54	14–2 (5–1)	Wisconsin Field House (13,500); Madison, WI
2/7/1949	No. 4	Northwestern; Rivalry	W 85–66	15–2 (6–1)	Huff Hall (12,088); Champaign, IL
2/12/1949	No. 4	No. 18 Ohio State	W 64–49	16–2 (7–1)	Huff Hall (6,905); Champaign, IL
2/21/1949	No. 4	Iowa; Rivalry	W 80–49	17–2 (8–1)	Huff Hall (–); Champaign, IL
2/26/1949	No. 4	vs. Northwestern; Rivalry	W 81–64	18–2 (9–1)	Chicago Stadium (17,905); Chicago, IL
2/28/1949	No. 4	Indiana; Rivalry	W 91–28	19–2 (10–1)	Huff Hall (–); Champaign, IL
3/7/1949	No. 4	at Michigan	L 53–70	19–3 (10–2)	Yost Field House (–); Ann Arbor, MI
NCAA tournament
3/21/1949*	No. 4	vs. Yale; NCAA tournament	W 71–67	20–3	Madison Square Garden (18,051); New York, NY
3/22/1949*	No. 4	vs. No. 1 Kentucky; NCAA Tournament Final Four	L 47–76	20–4	Madison Square Garden (15,126); New York, NY
3/26/1949*	No. 4	vs. Oregon State; NCAA Tournament 3rd place game	W 57–53	21–4	Hec Edmundson Pavilion (–); Seattle, WA
*Non-conference game. ^{#}Rankings from AP Poll. (#) Tournament seedings in parentheses. All times are in Central Time.

== NCAA basketball tournament ==
- Eastern
  - Illinois 71, Yale 67
- Final Four
  - Kentucky 76, Illinois 47
- Third-place game
  - Illinois 57, Oregon State 53

== Player stats ==
Player	Games played	Field goals	Free throws	Points
Dwight Eddleman	25	130	69	329
Wally Osterkorn	25	90	81	261
Bill Erickson	25	91	79	261
Fred Green	25	65	24	154
Don Sunderlage	25	57	39	153
Jim Marks	20	53	27	133
Walt Kersulis	20	43	23	109
Burdette Thurlby	17	36	21	93
Van Anderson	23	32	8	72
Dick Foley	24	24	11	59
Ted Beach	14	13	8	34
Roy Gatewood	9	9	4	22
Richard Brogren	6	4	3	11
Glen Trugillo	10	2	2	6
Benton Odum	3	1	3	3
Jim Cottrell	5	1	1	3
Bill Boyer	2	0	0	0

== Awards and honors ==
- Dwight Eddleman
  - Converse 1st team All-American (1949)
  - Associated Press 2nd team All-American (1949)
  - United Press International 2nd team All-American (1949)
  - Chicago Tribune Silver Basketball award (1949)
  - Big Ten Player of the Year (1949)
  - Fighting Illini All-Century team (2005)
  - Team Most Valuable Player
- Bill Erickson
  - Consensus 2nd team All-American (1949)
  - Helms 1st team All-American (1949)
  - Collier's Weekly 1st team All-American (1949)
  - National Association of Basketball Coaches 1st team All-American (1949)
  - United Press International 3rd team All-American (1949)
  - Sporting News 3rd team All-American (1949)
  - Converse Honorable Mention All-American (1949)

== Team players drafted into the NBA ==
Round	Pick	Player	NBA club
3	N/A	Dike Eddleman	Chicago Stags
