= 1948–49 Indiana Hoosiers men's basketball team =

American college basketball season

1948–49 Indiana Hoosiers men's basketball
- Conference: Big Ten Conference
- Record: 14–8 (6–6 Big Nine)
- Head coach: Branch McCracken (8th season)
- Assistant coaches: Jay McCreary; Ernie Andres
- Captain: Don Ritter
- Home arena: The Fieldhouse

1948–49 Big Nine Conference men's basketball standings
	Conf.				Overall
Team	W		L	PCT	W		L	PCT
No. 4 Illinois	10	–	2	.833	21	–	4	.840
No. 6 Minnesota	9	–	3	.750	18	–	3	.857
Michigan	7	–	5	.583	15	–	6	.714
No. 20 Ohio State	6	–	6	.500	14	–	7	.667
Indiana	6	–	6	.500	14	–	8	.636
Purdue	6	–	6	.500	13	–	9	.591
Wisconsin	5	–	7	.417	12	–	10	.545
Iowa	3	–	9	.250	10	–	10	.500
Northwestern	2	–	10	.167	5	–	16	.238
Rankings from AP Poll

The 1948–49 Indiana Hoosiers men's basketball team represented Indiana University. Their head coach was Branch McCracken, who was in his 8th year. The team played its home games in The Fieldhouse in Bloomington, Indiana, and was a member of the Big Nine Conference.

The Hoosiers finished the regular season with an overall record of 14–8 and a conference record of 6–6, finishing 4th in the Big Nine Conference. Indiana was not invited to participate in any postseason tournament.

== Roster ==
No.	Name	Position	Ht.	Year	Hometown
3	Jerry Stuteville	F	6–3	Jr.	Attica, Indiana
5	Bob Lukemeyer	F	5–10	So.	Jasper, Indiana
6	Lou Watson	G	6–5	Jr.	Jeffersonville, Indiana
7	Don Ritter	G	5–10	Sr.	Aurora, Indiana
8	Bill Garrett	C/F	6–3	So.	Shelbyville, Indiana
9	Bill Tosheff	F	6–1	So.	Gary, Indiana
11	Gene Ring	G	6–1	So.	South Bend, Indiana
12	Phil Buck	F	5–10	So.	Rossville, Indiana
14	Harlan Sturgeon	G	5–10	So.	Indianapolis, Indiana
15	Bob Armstrong	C	6–4	Sr.	Fort Wayne, Indiana
16	Stuart Chestnut	F	6–2	Jr.	Terre Haute, Indiana
18	Tom Schwartz	C	6–6	Jr.	Kokomo, Indiana
19	Charley Meyer	C	6–5	Jr.	Jeffersonville, Indiana
21	Tyrie Robbins	F	6–3	So.	Gary, Indiana
24	Byard Hey	G	6–1	Jr.	Fort Wayne, Indiana
24	Ted Kaufman	C	6–3	So.	Brownsville, Indiana
25	Gordon Neff	G	6–1	So.	Terre Haute, Indiana
34	Bob Lollar	F	6–2	Sr.	Indianapolis
N/A	Jack Brown	C	6–3	Jr.	Bloomington, Indiana

== Schedule/results ==
Date time, TV	Rank^{#}	Opponent^{#}	Result	Record	Site city, state
Regular season
12/4/1948*		DePauw	W 61–48	1–0	The Fieldhouse; Bloomington, Indiana
12/6/1948*		Michigan State	W 48–36	2–0	The Fieldhouse; Bloomington, Indiana
12/11/1948*		Xavier	W 63–55	3–0	The Fieldhouse; Bloomington, Indiana
12/13/1948*		Drake	W 57–35	4–0	The Fieldhouse; Bloomington, Indiana
12/16/1948*		Kansas State	W 56–36	5–0	The Fieldhouse; Bloomington, Indiana
12/21/1948*		at Washington (Mo.)	W 51–44	6–0	Field House; St. Louis, Missouri
12/27/1948*		at Butler; Hoosier Classic	L 55–64	6–1	Butler Fieldhouse; Indianapolis
12/28/1948*		vs. Notre Dame; Hoosier Classic	W 50–47	7–1	Butler Fieldhouse; Indianapolis
1/3/1949*		Marquette	W 56–47	8–1	The Fieldhouse; Bloomington, Indiana
1/8/1949		Illinois; Rivalry	L 42–44	8–2 (0–1)	The Fieldhouse; Bloomington, Indiana
1/10/1949		Iowa	W 50–39	9–2 (1–1)	The Fieldhouse; Bloomington, Indiana
1/15/1949		at Wisconsin	L 48–58	9–3 (1–2)	Wisconsin Field House; Madison, Wisconsin
1/17/1949		Purdue; Rivalry	W 56–42	10–3 (2–2)	The Fieldhouse; Bloomington, Indiana
1/22/1949		at Minnesota	L 28–35	10–4 (2–3)	Minnesota Field House; Minneapolis
2/5/1949*		at DePaul	L 46–47	10–5 (2–3)	University Auditorium; Chicago
2/7/1949		at Ohio State	L 59–72	10–6 (2–4)	Ohio Expo Center Coliseum; Columbus, Ohio
2/12/1949		Michigan	L 47–54	10–7 (2–5)	The Fieldhouse; Bloomington, Indiana
2/14/1949		Northwestern	W 56–41	11–7 (3–5)	The Fieldhouse; Bloomington, Indiana
2/19/1949		at Purdue; Rivalry	W 56–50	12–7 (4–5)	Lambert Fieldhouse; West Lafayette, Indiana
2/21/1949		Ohio State	W 65–45	13–7 (5–5)	The Fieldhouse; Bloomington, Indiana
2/26/1949		at Iowa	W 76–60	14–7 (6–5)	Iowa Field House; Iowa City, IA
2/28/1949		at Illinois; Rivalry	W 76–60	14–8 (6–6)	Huff Hall; Champaign, Illinois
*Non-conference game. ^{#}Rankings from AP Poll. (#) Tournament seedings in parentheses.
