= Bill Erickson =

American basketball player (1928–1987)

- Erickson from the 1950 Illio

Personal information
- Born: June 8, 1928 Rockford, Illinois, U.S.
- Died: September 21, 1987 (aged 59) Rockford, Illinois, U.S.
- Listed height: 6 ft 1 in (1.85 m)
- Listed weight: 184 lb (83 kg)

Career information
- High school: Rockford East (Rockford, Illinois)
- College: Illinois (1946–1950)
- NBA draft: 1950: 7th round, 83rd overall pick
- Drafted by: Tri-Cities Blackhawks
- Position: Guard
- Number: 33

Career highlights
- Consensus second-team All-American (1949); AP honorable mention All-American (1950); 2× All-Big Ten (1949, 1950)
- Stats at Basketball Reference

Bertil William Erickson (June 8, 1928 – September 21, 1987) was an NCAA All-American basketball player at the University of Illinois during a career that spanned from 1947 to 1950, and then a player in the National Professional Basketball League for the Saint Paul Lights.

== High school ==
A native of Rockford, Illinois, Erickson attended Rockford East High School from 1942–43 to 1945–46. He was a 6 ft 1 in (1.85 m) guard who led the team to the final 16 of the Illinois High School Association state basketball tournament as a junior, and then a fourth-place finish in Illinois as a senior. In his final year, Erickson was named First Team All-State by the Champaign News Gazette and Second Team All-State by the Chicago Daily News.

Erickson was an outstanding high school basketball player, where he led the E-Rabs to consecutive IHSA boys' "Sweet-16" appearances in 1945 and 1946. As a junior his team would finish the season with an overall record of 24 wins and only 3 losses and a Big 8 Conference record of 8 wins and 2 losses. Ironically this team would lose in the state tournament to conference opponent, Elgin. In his 24 games as a junior, Erickson scored 188 points, averaging 7.8 points per game and was named first team all-conference at forward.

As a senior, Erickson's team would dominate the conference, losing only to Elgin mid-season and finish the conference portion of the campaign with a 9–1 record. In the 26 games played during the season, Erickson would lead the team in scoring at 380 points, averaging 11.4 points per game and he would, once again, be named first-team all-conference at the forward position. When the conference portion of the season ended, the E-Rabs compiled an overall record of 15 wins and only 3 losses. During district and sectional play, Erickson's team would defeat all of the competition until the "final-four" where they would lose to eventual champion Champaign High School on the afternoon of March 16, 1946 at Huff Gymnasium in Champaign. In a twist of irony, the team from Champaign was coached by Erickson's future University of Illinois head coach, Harry Combes. The loss to Combes' team placed the East E-Rabs in the third place game versus Dundee Community High School. Unfortunately, Erickson's team lost the game, finishing in fourth place for the season. During the four game tournament, Erickson's teammate, Louis Proctor, would lead all scorers with 86 points and be named to the all-tournament team while Erickson finished fifth in scoring with 55 points. In his two years of varsity basketball, Erickson scored 568 points in 50 games, averaging 11.4 points per game.

In 1973, Erickson was inducted into the Illinois Basketball Coaches Association's Hall of Fame as a player.

== College ==
Erickson chose to play basketball at Illinois after high school. He played in every single game during his four-year career and was a starter for the final three. As a freshman during the 1946–47 season, Erickson joined the reunited group of "The Whiz Kids", Ken Menke, Gene Vance, and Andy Phillip as well as All-American guard Walt Kirk and the greatest athlete in the history of athletics at the University of Illinois, Dike Eddleman. It arguably was the most dominant team the Fighting Illini have ever put together, however, the talent of the team could not meet the expectations and the Illini would finish with an overall record of 14–6 and a Big 9 record of 8–4, second place in the conference.

As a sophomore during the 1947–48 season, Erickson and his teammates would welcome a new head coach to the Illini, Harry Combes. Erickson was familiar with Combes based on the fact that it was his Champaign High School team that had knocked Erickson's Rockford East team out of the Illinois high school basketball tournament just two seasons earlier. Combes was a proven winner based on his astounding 254–46 record in nine seasons as a high school coach. The team was now minus "The Whiz Kids", however it did not lack for talent, senior captain Jack Burmaster, juniors Dike Eddleman and Fred Green along with fellow sophomore Wally Osterkorn gelled as a team, winning all eight of their non-conference games. The Illini would finish with an overall record of 15–5 and a Big 9 record of 7–5, third place in the conference.

In his junior season of 1948–49, the Fighting Illini won the Big Nine Conference title and advanced to the NCAA Tournament. Illinois would defeat Yale to earn a berth in the Final Four (only eight teams played in the tournament back then), but would lose to eventual national champion Kentucky, 76–47. They would defeat Oregon State in the third place game, however. This was Illinois’ first 20-game winning team since 1908, finishing 21–4 overall and 10–2 in the conference. After the season, Erickson was named first team All-Big Ten and was dubbed a First Team All-American.

Prior to his senior season, Erickson was named the team captain, leading the Illini to a fourth-place finish in the conference at 7 wins and 5 losses while finishing the regular season with an overall record of 14 wins and 8 losses. Erickson would once again be an All-Big Ten selection and this time an Honorable Mention All-American. During his playing time at Illinois, Erickson's teams would win 66 games while only losing 23 times (win pct=74.2%). During conference play, Erickson's teams would win 32 of 48 games and win the 1949 championship.

In 2008, Erickson's jersey was honored and now hangs in the State Farm Center to show regard for being one of the most decorated basketball players in the University of Illinois' history.

== Professional career and later life ==
Erickson was selected in the 1950 NBA draft by the Tri-Cities Blackhawks in a late round. He never ended up playing for them, however, and instead played the 1950–51 season in two leagues, the NPBL with the Saint Paul Lights and in the ABL with the Wilkes-Barre Barons. Erickson followed his NPBL/ABL season by touring with the Harlem Globetrotters (Erickson would always play for the Globetrotters' opponents). From 1951 to 1953 Erickson was part of a group of college All-Stars that toured South America with the Globetrotters and the games were actual competitions. In the NPBL, Erickson scored 92 points in 20 games, averaging 4.6 points per game and in the ABL, he scored 156 points in 21 games averaging 7.4 points per game.

After his brief professional basketball career ended he returned home to Rockford. He coached basketball at Freeport High School from 1953 to 1955 followed by an opportunity to start the Rockford College men's basketball program, of which he was the first head coach. He remained the Rockford Regents head coach for three seasons from 1955 to 1958. Erickson also worked as personnel director for Elco Tool and Screw, and then later became the assistant vice president of American National Bank. Erickson died September 21, 1987, at the age of 59.

== Statistics ==
=== College basketball ===
Season	Games	Points	PPG	Big Ten Record	Overall Record	Postseason
1946–47	20	61	3.1	8–4	14–6	—
1947–48	20	147	7.4	7–5	15–5	—
1948–49	25	261	10.4	10–2	21–4	NCAA Final Four
1949–50	22	229	10.4	7–5	14–8	—
**Totals**	**87**	**698**	**8.0**	**32–16**	**64–23**	**1 appearance**

=== NPBL/ABL career statistics ===
Legend
GP	Games played	GS	Games started	MPG	Minutes per game
FG%	Field goal percentage	3P%	3-point field goal percentage	FT%	Free throw percentage
RPG	Rebounds per game	APG	Assists per game	SPG	Steals per game
BPG	Blocks per game	PPG	Points per game	**Bold**	Career high

==== Regular season ====
Year	Team	GP	MPG	FG%	FT%	RPG	APG	PPG
1950–51	Saint Paul Lights	20	–	–	.667	–	–	4.6
1950–51	Wilkes-Barre Barons	21	–	–	735	–	–	7.4
