= 1946–47 Indiana Hoosiers men's basketball team =

American college basketball season

1946–47 Indiana Hoosiers men's basketball
- Conference: Big Ten Conference
- Record: 12–8 (8–4 Big Nine)
- Head coach: Branch McCracken (6th season)
- Captain: Ralph Hamilton
- Home arena: The Fieldhouse

1946–47 Big Nine Conference men's basketball standings
	Conf.				Overall
Team	W		L	PCT	W		L	PCT
Wisconsin	9	–	3	.750	16	–	6	.727
Illinois	8	–	4	.667	14	–	6	.700
Indiana	8	–	4	.667	12	–	8	.600
Minnesota	7	–	5	.583	14	–	7	.667
Michigan	6	–	6	.500	12	–	8	.600
Iowa	5	–	7	.417	12	–	7	.632
Ohio State	5	–	7	.417	7	–	13	.350
Purdue	4	–	8	.333	9	–	11	.450
Northwestern	2	–	10	.167	7	–	13	.350

The 1946–47 Indiana Hoosiers men's basketball team represented Indiana University. After returning from serving as a lieutenant in the Navy during World War II, Branch McCracken resumed the head coaching position for a 6th year. The team played its home games in The Fieldhouse in Bloomington, Indiana, and was a member of the Big Nine Conference.

The Hoosiers finished the regular season with an overall record of 12–8 and a conference record of 8–4, finishing 2nd in the Big Nine Conference. Indiana was not invited to participate in any postseason tournament.

== Roster ==
No.	Name	Position	Ht.	Year	Hometown
3	Jerry Stuteville	F	6–3	Fr.	Attica, Indiana
4	Bob Cowan	G	5–10	Sr.	Fort Wayne, Indiana
4	Bob Lollar	F	6–2	So.	Indianapolis, Indiana
5	Ralph Hamilton	F	6–1	Sr.	Fort Wayne, Indiana
5	Murray Mendenhall	G	5–9	Fr.	Fort Wayne, Indiana
6	Lou Watson	G/F	6–5	Fr.	Jeffersonville, Indiana
7	Dave Walker	F	6–3	So.	Loogootee, Indiana
8	Al Herman	F	6–3	Fr.	Bloomington, Indiana
11	Lou Jensen	G	5–11	Fr.	New Albany, Indiana
12	Norbert Hermann	G	6–2	Jr.	Brownstown, Indiana
13	Al Kravolansky	F	6–3	Sr.	East Chicago, Indiana
14	Ward Williams	C	6–3	Jr.	Colfax, Indiana
15	Bob Armstrong	C	6–4	Fr.	Fort Wayne, Indiana
17	John Wallace	F	6–3	Jr.	Richmond, Indiana
19	Charley Meyer	C	6–5	Fr.	Jeffersonville, Indiana
22	Jack Brown	F	6–3	Fr.	Bloomington, Indiana
37	Don Ritter	G	5–10	So.	Aurora, Indiana
40	Robert Mehl	F	6–1	So.	Indianapolis
N/A	Ray Krupa	F	6–2	So.	East Chicago, Indiana

== Schedule/results ==
Date time, TV	Rank^{#}	Opponent^{#}	Result	Record	Site city, state
Regular season
12/2/1946*		Wabash	W 69–46	1–0	The Fieldhouse; Bloomington, Indiana
12/7/1946*		Miami (OH)	W 69–36	2–0	The Fieldhouse; Bloomington, Indiana
12/9/1946*		Notre Dame	L 60–70	2–1	The Fieldhouse; Bloomington, Indiana
12/14/1946*		at Louisville	L 46–53	2–2	Jefferson County Armory; Louisville, Kentucky
12/21/1946*		at Loyola (Chicago)	L 53–60	2–3	Alumni Gym; Chicago
1/2/1947*		at Butler	L 41–52	2–4	Butler Fieldhouse; Indianapolis
1/6/1947		at Ohio State	W 62–39	3–4 (1–0)	Ohio Expo Center Coliseum; Columbus, Ohio
1/11/1947		at Wisconsin	L 49–70	3–5 (1–1)	Wisconsin Field House; Madison, Wisconsin
1/13/1947		Purdue; Rivalry	W 62–46	4–5 (2–1)	The Fieldhouse; Bloomington, Indiana
1/18/1947		Iowa	W 50–48	5–5 (3–1)	The Fieldhouse; Bloomington, Indiana
1/20/1947		at Minnesota	L 56–59	5–6 (3–2)	Minnesota Field House; Minneapolis
1/23/1947*		at Marquette	W 74–50	6–6 (3–2)	Marquette Gymnasium; Milwaukee
1/25/1947		Michigan	W 55–42	7–6 (4–2)	The Fieldhouse; Bloomington, Indiana
2/8/1947*		at Earlham	W 93–41	8–6 (4–2)	Richmond, Indiana
2/15/1947		at Illinois; Rivalry	L 50–59	8–7 (4–3)	Huff Hall; Champaign, Illinois
2/17/1947		at Northwestern	W 69–43	9–7 (5–3)	Patten Gymnasium; Evanston, Illinois
2/22/1947		at Iowa	L 46–68	9–8 (5–4)	Iowa Field House; Iowa City, Iowa
2/24/1947		Ohio State	W 46–43	10–8 (6–4)	The Fieldhouse; Bloomington, Indiana
3/1/1947		Illinois; Rivalry	W 48–41	11–8 (7–4)	The Fieldhouse; Bloomington, Indiana
3/3/1947		at Purdue; Rivalry	W 54–38	12–8 (8–4)	Lambert Fieldhouse; West Lafayette, Indiana
*Non-conference game. ^{#}Rankings from AP Poll. (#) Tournament seedings in parentheses.
