= 1949–50 Illinois Fighting Illini men's basketball team =

American college basketball season

1949–50 Illinois Fighting Illini men's basketball
- Conference: Big Ten Conference
- Record: 14–8 (7-5 Big Ten)
- Head coach: Harry Combes (3rd season)
- Assistant coach: Howie Braun (13th season)
- MVP: Wally Osterkorn
- Captain: Bill Erickson
- Home arena: Huff Hall

1949–50 Big Nine Conference men's basketball standings
| | Conf. | | | | Overall |
| Team | W | | L | PCT | W | | L | PCT |
|---|---|---|---|---|---|---|---|---|
| No. 2 Ohio State | 11 | – | 1 | .917 | 22 | – | 4 | .846 |
| No. 16 Wisconsin | 9 | – | 3 | .750 | 17 | – | 5 | .773 |
| No. 20 Indiana | 7 | – | 5 | .583 | 17 | – | 5 | .773 |
| Illinois | 7 | – | 5 | .583 | 14 | – | 8 | .636 |
| Iowa | 6 | – | 6 | .500 | 15 | – | 7 | .682 |
| Minnesota | 4 | – | 8 | .333 | 13 | – | 9 | .591 |
| Michigan | 4 | – | 8 | .333 | 11 | – | 11 | .500 |
| Northwestern | 3 | – | 9 | .250 | 10 | – | 12 | .455 |
| Purdue | 3 | – | 9 | .250 | 9 | – | 13 | .409 |
Rankings from AP Poll

The 1949–50 Illinois Fighting Illini men’s basketball team represented the University of Illinois.

== Regular season ==
The 1949-50 season looked to have solid promise based on the fact that the team had 3 returning starters from a "Final Four" team a year earlier. Unfortunately for the Fighting Illini men's basketball team, the conference season proved to be more difficult than expected. With 5 of the team's 8 losses coming at the hands of conference competition, the Illini, not only placed in a third place tie in the Big Ten, they also missed out on the opportunity to play in a post-season tournament. Head coach Harry Combes had guided the team a year earlier to a Big Ten championship, a third place finish in the 1949 NCAA Men's Division I Basketball Tournament and a final AP ranking of No. 4 in the nation. The 1949-50 team compiled an overall record of 14 wins and 8 losses with a conference record of 7 wins and 5 losses. The starting lineup included captain William Erickson, Roy Gatewood and Donald Sunderlage as forwards, Rodney Fletcher, and Burdette Thurlby at guard and Walter Osterkorn and Mack Follmer rotating at the center position.

=== Roster ===
1949–50 Illinois Fighting Illini men's basketball team
Players
Coaches

| Pos. | # | Name | Height | Weight | Year | Previous school | Hometown |
|---|---|---|---|---|---|---|---|
| G | 7 | Jim Cottrell | 5 ft 10 in (1.78 m) | 167 lb (76 kg) | Jr | Champaign Central High School | Champaign, Illinois |
| F | 8 | Roy Gatewood | 6 ft 2 in (1.88 m) | 174 lb (79 kg) | Sr | Salem High School | Salem, Illinois |
| G | 11 | Don Sunderlage | 6 ft 1 in (1.85 m) | 180 lb (82 kg) | Jr | Elgin High School | Elgin, Illinois |
| C | 13 | Walter Osterkorn | 6 ft 4.5 in (1.94 m) | 207 lb (94 kg) | Sr | Amundsen High School | Chicago, Illinois |
| F | 14 | Burdette Thurlby | 6 ft 2 in (1.88 m) | 180 lb (82 kg) | Sr | Kirkland High School | Kirkland, Illinois |
| C | 21 | Walt Kersulis | 6 ft 4 in (1.93 m) | 197 lb (89 kg) | Sr | East St. Louis Senior High School | East St. Louis, Illinois |
| F | 22 | Van Anderson | 6 ft 2 in (1.88 m) | 185 lb (84 kg) | Sr | Sullivan Community High School | Sullivan, Illinois |
| F | 23 | Ted Beach | 6 ft 1 in (1.85 m) | 165 lb (75 kg) | Jr | Champaign Central High School | Champaign, Illinois |
| C | 27 | Mack Follmer | 6 ft 4 in (1.93 m) | 200 lb (91 kg) | So | Forrest High School | Forrest, Illinois |
| F | 30 | Glen Trugillo | 5 ft 11 in (1.8 m) | 160 lb (73 kg) | Jr | East High School | Rockford, Illinois |
| G | 33 | Bill Erickson (C) | 6 ft 1 in (1.85 m) | 184 lb (83 kg) | Sr | East High School | Rockford, Illinois |
| G | 34 | Seymour Gantman | 5 ft 7 in (1.7 m) | 165 lb (75 kg) | So | Marshall High School | Chicago, Illinois |
| G | 35 | Ren Alde | 6 ft 2 in (1.88 m) | 180 lb (82 kg) | So | Pana High School | Pana, Illinois |
| G | 37 | Rod Fletcher | 6 ft 4 in (1.93 m) | 194 lb (88 kg) | So | Champaign Central High School | Champaign, Illinois |
| G | 38 | Herb Gerecke | 6 ft 1 in (1.85 m) | 180 lb (82 kg) | So | Pekin High School | Pekin, Illinois |
| | | John Marks | — | — | Jr | Edwardsville High School | Edwardsville, Illinois |
| | | Cliff Fulton | — | — | Sr | Mooseheart High School | Mooseheart, Illinois |

Head coach

- Harry Combes (University of Illinois) (3rd year)

Assistant coach(es)

- Howie Braun (University of Illinois) (13th year)

Legend

- (C) Team captain
- (S) Suspended
- (I) Ineligible
- (W) Walk-on
- Injured
- Current redshirt

Roster

== Schedule ==
| Date time, TV | Rank^{#} | Opponent^{#} | Result | Record | Site (attendance) city, state |
Non-Conference regular season
| 12/3/1949* | | at Butler | W 60–56 | 1-0 | Hinkle Fieldhouse (7,704); Indianapolis, IN |
| 12/8/1949* | | Toledo | W 67–51 | 2-0 | Huff Hall (6,905); Champaign, IL |
| 12/10/1949* | | at Oklahoma | L 47–55 | 2-1 | McCasland Field House (4,500); Norman, OK |
| 12/14/1949* | | Arkansas | W 65–53 | 3-1 | Huff Hall (6,905); Champaign, IL |
| 12/17/1949* | | Oklahoma | W 57–47 | 4-1 | Huff Hall (6,905); Champaign, IL |
| 12/22/1949* | | St. Louis | W 59–47 | 5-1 | Huff Hall (5,333); Champaign, IL |
| 12/23/1949* | | UCLA | L 63–65 | 5-2 | Huff Hall (6,905); Champaign, IL |
| 12/27/1949* | | Columbia | W 58–46 | 6-2 | Huff Hall (4,760); Champaign, IL |
| 12/30/1949* | | Princeton | W 68–61 | 7-2 | Huff Hall (4,593); Champaign, IL |
Big Ten regular season
| 1/2/1950 | | at Wisconsin | L 50–59 | 7-3 (0-1) | Wisconsin Field House (13,000); Madison, WI |
| 1/7/1950 | No. 16 | at Ohio State | L 62–83 | 7-4 (0-2) | Ohio Expo Center Coliseum (-); Columbus, OH |
| 1/9/1950 | | Purdue | W 59–54 | 8-4 (1-2) | Huff Hall (6,905); Champaign, IL |
| 1/16/1950 | | Northwestern; Rivalry | W 76–50 | 9-4 (2-2) | Huff Hall (6,905); Champaign, IL |
| 1/21/1950 | | No. 11 Ohio State | W 66–50 | 10-4 (3-2) | Huff Hall (6,905); Champaign, IL |
| 2/1/1950* | No. 20 | at St. Louis | L 42–62 | 10-5 | Bauman–Eberhardt Center (-); St. Louis, MO |
| 2/4/1950 | | at Minnesota | W 67–57 | 11-5 (4-2) | Williams Arena (13,527); Minneapolis, MN |
| 2/11/1950 | | at Iowa; Rivalry | L 65–70 | 11-6 (4-3) | Iowa Field House (13,394); Iowa City, IA |
| 2/13/1950 | | No. 16 Indiana; Rivalry | L 72–83 | 11-7 (4-4) | Huff Hall (6,905); Champaign, IL |
| 2/18/1950 | | Michigan | W 70–60 | 12-7 (5-4) | Huff Hall (6,905); Champaign, IL |
| 2/25/1950 | | Wisconsin | W 76–58 | 13-7 (6-4) | Huff Hall (6,905); Champaign, IL |
| 2/27/1950 | | at No. 17 Indiana; Rivalry | L 66–80 | 13-8 (6-5) | The Field House (10,036); Bloomington, IN |
| 3/4/1950 | | at Northwestern; Rivalry | W 69–52 | 14-8 (7-5) | Chicago Stadium (14,200); Chicago, IL |
*Non-conference game. ^{#}Rankings from AP Poll. (#) Tournament seedings in parentheses. All times are in Central Time.

== Player stats ==
| Player | Games played | Field goals | Free throws | Points |
|---|---|---|---|---|
| Wally Osterkorn | 22 | 125 | 83 | 333 |
| Bill Erickson | 22 | 78 | 73 | 229 |
| Burdette Thurlby | 21 | 57 | 52 | 166 |
| Don Sunderlage | 22 | 54 | 45 | 153 |
| Rod Fletcher | 19 | 39 | 24 | 102 |
| Roy Gatewood | 17 | 38 | 18 | 94 |
| Mack Follmer | 22 | 34 | 13 | 81 |
| Van Anderson | 19 | 25 | 14 | 64 |
| Walt Kersulis | 19 | 23 | 14 | 60 |
| Ted Beach | 19 | 20 | 13 | 53 |
| Cliff Fulton | 17 | 7 | 7 | 21 |
| Herb Gerecke | 6 | 3 | 5 | 11 |
| Seymour Gantman | 7 | 3 | 3 | 9 |
| Jim Cottrell | 4 | 1 | 2 | 4 |
| John Marks | 1 | 1 | 0 | 2 |
| Glen Trugillo | 2 | 1 | 0 | 2 |
| Ron Alde | 1 | 0 | 0 | 0 |

== Awards and honors ==
- Bill Erickson
  - Converse Honorable Mention All-American (1950)
- Wally Osterkorn
  - Team Most Valuable Player

== Team players drafted into the NBA ==
| Round | Pick | Player | NBA club |
| 2 | 15 | Wally Osterkorn | Chicago Stags |
| 7 | 83 | Bill Erickson | Tri-Cities Blackhawks |
