= Don Luft =

American football player (1930–2002)

Profile
- Position: Defensive end

Personal information
- Born: February 14, 1930; Winnebago County, Wisconsin
- Died: June 19, 2002 (aged 72)

Career information
- College: Indiana

Career history
- 1954: Philadelphia Eagles
- Stats at Pro Football Reference

Donald Richard Luft (February 14, 1930 – June 19, 2002) was a defensive end in the National Football League. He played with the Philadelphia Eagles during the 1954 NFL season.
