= Leo VanderKuy =

American basketball player

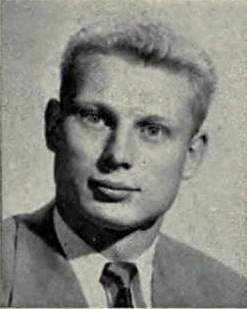

Personal information
- Born: May 5, 1929 Michigan, U.S.
- Died: January 31, 2000 (aged 70) Shreveport, Louisiana, U.S.
- Listed height: 6 ft 5 in (1.96 m)

Career information
- College: Michigan (1948–1951)
- NBA draft: 1951: 5th round, 49th overall pick
- Drafted by: Minneapolis Lakers
- Position: Center

Career highlights
- Second-team All-Big Ten (1951)
- Stats at Basketball Reference

Leo VanderKuy (May 5, 1929 – January 31, 2000) was an American basketball center. He played for the University of Michigan from 1948 to 1951 and set the program's single season scoring record with 329 points during the 1950–51 season.

== Early life ==
VanderKuy was six feet, five inches tall. He grew up in Pontiac, and Holland, Michigan.

== College career ==
VanderKuy enrolled at the University of Michigan in 1947 and was a member of the school's frosh basketball team during the 1947–48 season. Over the three years that followed his freshman year, VanderKuy became one of the leading scorers in the history of the Michigan basketball program. As a sophomore during the 1948–49 season, VanderKuy scored 141 points in 21 games. As a junior during the 1949–50 season, he was the team's second highest scorer with 274 points in 22 games for an average of 12.5 points per game. As a senior during the 1950–51 season, he was the team's leading scorer with 329 points in 22 games for an average of 15.0 points per game. On March 9, 1951, VanderKuy was selected as the most valuable player on the 1950–51 team. He was also selected as the second-team All-Big Ten Conference center by the conference coaches for United Press International.

VanderKuy's 329 points during the 1950–51 season broke Michigan's single season scoring record of 278 points, set by Mack Supronowicz during the 1949–50 season. VanderKuy's record was broken in 1954 by Jim Barron.

VanderKuy was selected by the Minneapolis Lakers in the fifth round, 49th overall pick, of the 1951 NBA draft. However, he did not play professional basketball.

VanderKuy graduated from Michigan in 1951 with a bachelor of arts degree in physical education.

== Personal life ==
Following college, VanderKuy moved to Shreveport, Louisiana where he was a salesman for an Oldsmobile and Cadillac dealer. He and his wife, Charmy, had four children. He died in Shreveport in January 2000.
