= Mack Supronowicz =

American basketball player

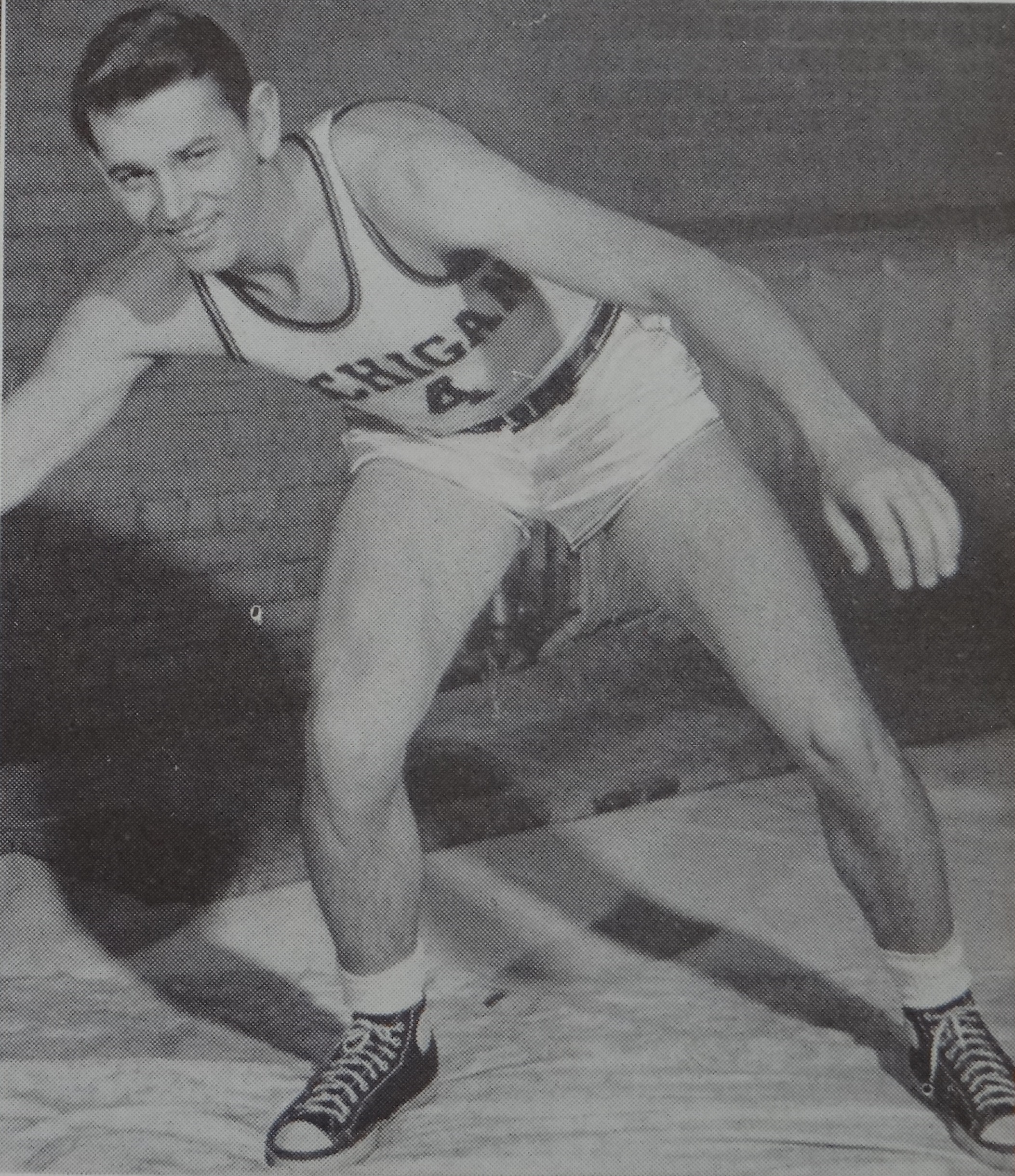

Personal information
- Born: January 17, 1927 Schenectady, New York
- Died: June 4, 2010 (aged 83) Bay City, Michigan
- Listed height: 6 ft 1 in (1.85 m)
- Listed weight: 180 lb (82 kg)

Career information
- High school: Mt. Pleasant (Schenectady, New York)
- College: Michigan (1947–1950)
- NBA draft: 1950: 6th round, 12th overall pick
- Drafted by: Syracuse Nationals
- Position: Forward

Career history
- 1950–1951: Denver Refiners
- Stats at Basketball Reference

Mack "Soup" Supronowicz (January 17, 1927 - June 4, 2010) was an American basketball forward. He played for the University of Michigan from 1947–1950 and was inducted into the University of Michigan Athletic Hall of Honor in 1990.

A native of Schenectady, New York, Supronowicz was 6 foot, 1 inch, and 180 pounds. He played high school basketball for Mt. Pleasant High School. As a senior in 1946, he scored 20 points in a 53-29 victory over Manlius Military Academy.

He enrolled at the University of Michigan in 1946 and was a four-year starter for the school's basketball team. As a freshman in 1947, Supronowicz was selected as the Wolverines' most valuable player and ranked as one of the leading scorers in the Big Nine Conference. His outstanding performance in his freshman year led a New York newspaper to write the following:

"Mack Supronowicz of Schenectady, freshman sensation at the University of Michigan. In his first season of Big Nine play, Supronowicz, one of the finest basketball players developed by Sig Makofski at Mount Pleasant, scored 163 points in 12 games (of which Michigan won only six) and won wide acclaim as the greatest cage prospect in college history. On Monday night, Supronowicz climaxed his first Western Conference season by scoring ten field goals and five fouls for 25 points as the Wolverines topped Ohio State, 66-42. Twenty-two of his points came in the second half."

Despite being hampered by a concussion for much of the 1948 season, he was chosen as the outstanding basketball player in the Big Nine Conference as a sophomore. He also led Michigan to the NCAA tournament in 1948. In the consolation game against Columbia, Michigan began the second half with a ten-point surge, including three plays in which Supronowicz dribbled down the floor for easy layups, as Michigan defeated Columbia 66-49 at Madison Square Garden.

In February 1949, he set a Michigan single-game scoring record with 28 points in a 64-53 win over Purdue. Earlier that month, Supronowicz also had a 23-point game, including 11 free throws, in a 54-47 win over defending conference champion, Indiana. Supronowicz's single-game Wolverines scoring record was tied in 1956 by football Hall of Famer Ron Kramer.

His brothers Dick and Wally played college basketball for Syracuse and Holy Cross. The Supronowicz brothers all played high school basketball in Schenectady.

== See also ==
- University of Michigan Athletic Hall of Honor
